= 2026–27 Ekstraliga (women's football) =

Polish women's football league season

Ekstraliga
- Season: 2026–27
- Dates: 31 July 2026 – TBD 2027
- Matches: 65
- Goals: 225 (3.46 per match)
- Top goalscorer: Julia Jędrzejewska – Patrycja Sarapata (7 goals)
- All statistics correct as of 18 November 2026.

The 2026–27 season of the Ekstraliga, also known as Orlen Ekstraliga for sponsorship reasons, is the 52th season of the top-tier women's football league in Poland.

Czarni Antrans Sosnowiec are the defending champions, having won their fourteenth title in the 2025–26 season.

The schedule for the first half of the 2026–27 season has been announced on 10 July 2026. 11 matchdays are scheduled to be played in 2026, with the first matchday scheduled for 31 July, 1 and 2 August 2026.

== Teams ==
Locations of teams in the 2026–27 Ekstraliga.

Team	Home city	Home ground	Capacity	2025–26 finish
AP Orlen Gdańsk	Gdańsk	Gdańsk Sports Center Stadium; Polsat Plus Arena Gdańsk	12,244; 41,620	10th
AZS UJ Kraków	Kraków	Uczelniane Centrum Sportowo-Rekreacyjne	1,224	9th
Czarni Antrans Sosnowiec	Sosnowiec	ArcelorMittal Park	11,600	1st
GKS Katowice	Katowice	GKS Katowice Stadium	6,710	3rd
Górnik Łęczna	Łęczna	Łęczna Stadium	7,226	4th
Grot SMS Łódź	Łódź	SMS Stadium	2,000	5th
Lech Poznań UAM	Poznań	GOSiR Stadium in Plewiska	600	8th
Legia Warsaw	Warsaw	Legia Training Center	1,000	1st in I liga
Pogoń Szczecin	Szczecin	Florian Krygier Municipal Stadium side-pitch no. 3	1,082	2nd
Rekord Bielsko-Biała	Bielsko-Biała	Rekord Sports Centre	600	6th
Śląsk Wrocław	Wrocław	Oporowska Stadium	8,346	7th
Ślęza Wrocław	Wrocław	Centrum Piłkarskie Kłokoczyce	800	2nd in I liga

=== Team changes ===
Promoted from 2025–26 I liga	Relegated from 2025–26 Ekstraliga
▲ Legia Warsaw (1st) ▲ Ślęza Wrocław (2nd)	▼ Energa Stomilanki Olsztyn (11th) ▼ Pogoń Dekpol Tczew (12th)

== League table ==
Pos	Team	Pld	W	D	L	GF	GA	GD	Pts	Qualification
1	GKS Katowice	10	8	1	1	31	10	+21	25	Qualification for the Champions League first qualifying round
2	Pogoń Szczecin	11	8	0	3	28	12	+16	24	
3	Czarni Antrans Sosnowiec	11	7	2	2	28	15	+13	23	
4	Górnik Łęczna	11	6	3	2	25	12	+13	21	
5	AP Orlen Gdańsk	11	5	3	3	16	15	+1	18	
6	AZS UJ Kraków	11	4	3	4	15	17	−2	15	
7	Legia Warsaw	11	4	2	5	19	22	−3	14	
8	Lech Poznań UAM	11	4	1	6	17	23	−6	13	
9	Ślęza Wrocław	11	3	2	6	20	26	−6	11	
10	Rekord Bielsko-Biała	11	1	4	6	11	26	−15	7	Qualification for the relegation play-offs
11	Grot SMS Łódź	10	1	3	6	5	21	−16	6	Relegation to I liga
12	Śląsk Wrocław	11	0	4	7	10	26	−16	4	Relegation to I liga

Updated to match(es) played on 18 November 2026. Source: 90minut.pl
Rules for classification: 1) Points; 2) Head-to-head points; 3) Head-to-head goal difference; 4) Goal difference; 5) Goals scored; 6) Number of wins; 7) Number of away wins. 8) Lower amount of yellow cards received. 9) Draw.
(Note: Head-to-head record is used only after all the matches between the teams in question have been played)

== Results ==
Home \ Away	AZS	CZA	GÓR	KAT	LEG	LPO	ORL	PSZ	REK	SMS	ŚLĄ	ŚLĘ
AZS UJ Kraków					0–0	0–2		1–4		3–0	2–1	4–1
Czarni Antrans Sosnowiec	2–0				3–0		1–1	0–3	4–1	5–0		
Górnik Łęczna	2–2	1–3		1–2			2–0		5–1	3–0		
GKS Katowice	3–0	3–3			6–0		3–0		3–1			2–1
Legia Warsaw			1–1			4–3	0–2	1–2			3–0	5–2
Lech Poznań UAM		2–3	0–3	0–5				1–3				
AP Orlen Gdańsk	1–2					3–1		2–1				2–2
Pogoń Szczecin			1–3	3–0					1–2		5–0	
Rekord Bielsko-Biała	1–1				1–4	0–1	1–1					1–4
Grot SMS Łódź						0–3	1–2	0–2	1–1			0–0
Śląsk Wrocław		0–2	1–1	1–4		2–2	1–2		1–1	1–1		
Ślęza Wrocław		4–2	1–3			0–2		2–3			3–2	

Updated to match(es) played on unknown. Source: 90minut.pl
Legend: Blue = home team win; Yellow = draw; Red = away team win.

== Top scorers ==
(Last Update Date — 18 November 2026)
Rank	Player	Club	Goals
1	Julia Jędrzejewska	Górnik Łęczna	7
2	Patrycja Sarapata	Czarni Sosnowiec	7
3	Klaudia Maciążka	GKS Katowice	6
4	Lena Świrska	Pogoń Szczecin	6
5	Klaudia Fabová	AP Orlen Gdańsk	5
6	Karolina Gec	AZS UJ Kraków	5
7	Patrícia Hmírová	GKS Katowice	5
8	Bianca Ienovan	Pogoń Szczecin	5
9	Molly McLaughlin	GKS Katowice	5
10	Karlīna Miksone	Czarni Sosnowiec	4
