= Nina Abe =

Polish footballer (born 2007)

Personal information
- Date of birth: 18 July 2007 (age 19)
- Position: Forward

Team information
- Current team: Pogoń Tczew
- Number: 17

Youth career
- 2013–2021: Błękitni Wejherowo
- 2021–2022: AP Lotos Gdańsk

Senior career*
Years	Team	Apps	(Gls)
2022–2024	TKKF Checz Gdynia	32	(8)
2024–	Pogoń Tczew	38	(5)

International career^{‡}
2021	Poland U15	2	(0)
2023	Poland U16	3	(0)
2023	Poland U17	3	(0)
2024–	Poland U19	4	(0)
- * Club domestic league appearances and goals as of 21:55, 2 June 2026 (UTC) ‡ National team caps and goals as of 23 June 2025

Nina Abe (born 18 July 2007) is a Polish professional footballer who plays as a forward for I liga club Pogoń Tczew.

== Early life and youth career ==
A native of Lębork, Abe began playing football at the age of six, taking inspiration from her two older brothers. She joined Błękitni Łęczyce – a newly created branch of the WAPN Błękitni academy – in nearby Łęczyce as her first club. In 2019, Abe helped the under-12 team win the Pomeranian provincial title and place ninth at the nationwide Tymbark Cup in Warsaw. She also represented the provincial team at the under-13 and under-15 levels under the auspices of the Pomeranian Football Association. Already characterized by her speed and vision on the pitch, Abe joined AP Lotos Gdańsk in July 2021. During this time, she did her homework on her commutes to Gdańsk from her hometown. Abe helped the under-15 indoor team win the 2022 LOTOS Griffin Cup and was named the player of the tournament.

In her youth, Abe expressed her admiration for players such as Robert Lewandowski, Ewa Pajor, and Neymar. Aside from football, she was also a successful cross country runner, competing in the Lębork Grand Prix Cup.

== Club career ==
From 2022 to 2024, Abe played for TKKF Checz Gdynia in the second-tier I liga. She scored her first professional goal in a 2–2 draw against Stomilanki Olsztyn on 5 November 2022 and finished her first season with four goals. Abe scored four more league goals in her second season in 2023–2024, including a brace in a 5–0 win over Legionistki Warszawa on 18 November 2023. She also netted a brace in a 15–0 Polish Cup win over PTC Pabianice earlier that month. (Note: Other sources indicate Abe scored one goal.)

On 10 August 2024, it was announced that Abe had signed with Ekstraliga side Pogoń Tczew. She made her top-flight debut on the first matchday of the 2024–25 season against Czarni Sosnowiec. On 16 October, Abe scored a hat-trick in an 11–0 Polish Cup win over Włókniarz Białystok in the round of 32. In the next round, she scored two goals, including a game-winning strike in the 85th minute, in a 3–2 victory over the UKS SMS Łódź reserves. Pogoń Tczew reached the quarterfinals, where they lost to defending league champions Pogoń Szczecin. Abe scored her first two Ekstraliga goals on 8 March 2025, netting a brace in a 2–3 loss to Śląsk Wrocław. On 3 May, she recorded a goal and an assist in a blowout loss to GKS Katowice, who secured the league title with the win. Abe scored another brace in a 3–3 draw against Rekord Bielsko-Biała the following week. She finished her first top-flight season with five goals in 19 league appearances as she helped Pogoń Tczew to a ninth-place finish. Aside from leading her team in scoring, she was the highest-scoring rookie in the league. In an earlier match against Rekord Bielsko-Biała, Abe was recorded at a speed of 30.7 km/h (19.1 mph), making her one of the fastest players in the league as well.

== International career ==
A Poland youth international, Abe has been capped at the U15, U16, U17, and U19 levels. She first scouted by national team coaches at the 2019 Tymbark Cup. In October 2021, Abe was invited to the Poland under-15 training camp in Wałbrzych, representing the Poland U15s in a pair of friendly wins against the Czech Republic later that month to mark her youth international debut. She earned another call-up for training camp in Piaseczno in November.

In January 2023, Abe was called up to the Poland U16s by manager Marcin Kasprowicz ahead of the UEFA Under-16 Development Tournament held in Portugal, which they departed for after a training camp in Kraków. She appeared in all three matches against Liechtenstein, Portugal, and Scotland, respectively. In early August, Abe was invited to the Poland under-17 training camp in Warsaw. She joined the squad that October for 2024 UEFA Women's Under-17 Championship qualifiers, appearing in all three matches against Iceland, Norway, and Ireland, respectively, as Poland won the group and advanced to the second round. Abe was called up to two further under-17 training camp sessions in 2024: in January in Pruszków and in April in Warsaw.

In May 2024, Abe was called up to the Poland U19s by manager Katarzyna Barlewicz for training camp in Nowy Sącz ahead of a friendly against Slovakia, starting in a 1–2 loss. She earned another U19 call-up in May 2025, starting in a 5–2 friendly win over Ukraine. The following month, Abe was named in the Poland U19s squad for the 2025 UEFA Women's Under-19 Championship.

== Personal life ==
Abe is of Nigerian descent through her father.
