= 2022–23 Ekstraliga Kobiet =

Poland women's 1st tier association football season

Ekstraliga
- Season: 2022–23
- Dates: 13 August 2022 – 28 May 2023
- Champions: GKS Katowice
- Relegated: KKP Bydgoszcz; Sportowa Czwórka Radom
- Champions League: GKS Katowice
- Top goalscorer: Dominika Kopińska (20 goals)

The 2022–23 Orlen Ekstraliga was the 48th edition of Poland's highest women's football league. UKS SMS Łódź were the defending champions.

GKS Katowice became the champions. It was the first championship in the club's history.

== Teams ==
=== Stadiums and locations ===
Location of teams in 2022–23 Ekstraliga.

Team	Location	Venue	Capacity
KKP Bydgoszcz	Bydgoszcz	Stadion Miejski im. Eugeniusza Połtyna	1000
APLG Gdańsk	Gdańsk	Gdański Stadion Lekkoatletyczny i Rugby	924
GKS Katowice	Katowice	Stadion Podlesianki Katowice	1000
Medyk Konin	Konin	Stadion im. Złotej Jedenastki Kazimierza Górskiego	15,000
AZS UJ Kraków	Kraków	Stadion Miejski im. Władysława Kawuli	1224
Górnik Łęczna	Łęczna	Stadion Górnika Łęczna	7200
UKS SMS Łódź	Łódź	Stadion SMS im. Kazimierza Górskiego	2000
Sportowa Czwórka Radom	Radom		
Czarni Sosnowiec	Sosnowiec	Stadion im. Jana Ciszewskiego	700
Pogoń Szczecin	Szczecin		
Pogoń Tczew	Tczew		
Śląsk Wrocław	Wrocław	Stadion hotelu GEM	400

== League table ==
=== Standings ===
Pos	Team	Pld	W	D	L	GF	GA	GD	Pts	
1	GKS Katowice	22	18	1	3	48	17	+31	55	Qualification for the Champions League first qualifying round
2	Górnik Łęczna	22	16	4	2	79	30	+49	52	
3	UKS SMS Łódź	22	17	1	4	62	24	+38	52	
4	AZS UJ Kraków	22	12	4	6	41	31	+10	40	
5	Pogoń Szczecin	22	12	1	9	42	30	+12	37	
6	Śląsk Wrocław	22	10	2	10	46	38	+8	32	
7	Czarni Sosnowiec	22	8	6	8	36	29	+7	30	
8	APLG Gdańsk	22	6	6	10	25	32	−7	24	
9	Pogoń Tczew	22	5	3	14	29	56	−27	18	
10	Medyk Konin	22	4	3	15	25	49	−24	15	
11	KKP Bydgoszcz	22	3	4	15	19	54	−35	13	Relegation to 2023–24 1. liga
12	Sportowa Czwórka Radom	22	3	1	18	19	81	−62	10	Relegation to 2023–24 1. liga

Source: 90 minut

=== Results ===
Home \ Away	BYD	GDA	KAT	KON	KRA	ŁĘC	ŁÓD	RAD	SOS	SZC	TCZ	WRO
KKP Bydgoszcz	—	1–1	0–2	2–3	0–0	0–4	0–1	2–1	2–2	2–4	2–3	0–2
APLG Gdańsk	1–1	—	0–2	1–0	0–1	0–2	0–3	3–0	0–0	3–2	3–1	1–2
GKS Katowice	2–0	1–0	—	2–1	3–0	4–0	3–0	4–1	1–1	3–0	1–0	0–2
Medyk Konin	2–0	2–1	1–3	—	3–3	0–0	2–4	3–0	1–1	0–2	1–2	1–6
AZS UJ Kraków	2–0	2–2	4–3	1–0	—	3–4	1–4	4–0	1–1	0–2	2–0	1–0
Górnik Łęczna	9–0	1–1	0–3	4–0	4–2	—	5–2	8–1	0–0	2–1	3–3	8–1
UKS SMS Łódź	5–1	2–0	1–3	4–1	3–2	0–2	—	6–0	2–0	1–0	5–0	3–2
Sportowa Czwórka Radom	1–0	2–5	2–3	2–1	0–2	2–9	1–1	—	0–4	3–0	0–6	0–3
Czarni Sosnowiec	0–1	3–0	0–1	2–0	0–4	2–4	0–3	6–1	—	3–0	2–1	3–1
Pogoń Szczecin	5–0	3–0	3–0	2–1	1–2	1–4	1–2	4–2	3–1	—	4–0	1–0
Pogoń Tczew	1–3	0–2	0–1	4–2	1–2	3–4	0–7	1–0	0–4	0–0	—	3–3
Śląsk Wrocław	5–0	1–1	1–3	3–0	0–2	1–2	0–3	6–0	3–1	1–3	5–0	—

Source: 90 minut
Legend: Blue = home team win; Yellow = draw; Red = away team win.

== Top goalscorers ==
Rank	Player	Team	Goals
1	Dominika Kopińska	UKS SMS Łódź	20
2	Magdalena Sobal	Pogoń Tczew	18
3	Klaudia Fabová	Górnik Łęczna	17
3	Klaudia Miłek	Górnik Łęczna	17
5	Amelia Bińkowska	GKS Katowice	15
6	Katarzyna Białoszewska	Śląsk Wrocław	14
6	Klaudia Lefeld	Górnik Łęczna	14
8	Klaudia Jedlińska	UKS SMS Łódź	11
8	Oliwia Rapacka	Górnik Łęczna	11
10	Natalia Oleszkiewicz	Pogoń Szczecin	10
10	Anna Rędzia	UKS SMS Łódź	10
