= Gabriela Grzybowska =

Polish footballer (born 2002)

Personal information
- Date of birth: 21 November 2002 (age 23)
- Place of birth: Augustów, Poland
- Position: Midfielder

Team information
- Current team: Nantes
- Number: 6

Youth career
- –2018: SMS Łódź

Senior career*
Years	Team	Apps	(Gls)
2018–2024	SMS Łódź	87	(30)
2024–2025	GKS Katowice	30	(4)
2025–2026	Dijon	21	(1)
2026–	Nantes	4	(0)

International career^{‡}
2020	Poland U19	3	(0)
2023–2024	Poland U23	3	(1)
2021–	Poland	11	(0)
- * Club domestic league appearances and goals as of 10:22, 6 October 2026 (UTC) ‡ National team caps and goals as of 21:19, 9 June 2026 (UTC)

Gabriela Grzybowska (born 21 November 2002) is a Polish professional footballer who plays as a midfielder for French Première Ligue club Nantes and the Poland national team. She has previously played for Polish Ekstraliga clubs SMS Łódź and GKS Katowice, as well as Dijon in France.

== Early life ==
Grzybowska grew up in Augustów, Poland. She participated in both karate and floorball in addition to football as a child. She was introduced to football by her brother, Bartek. At age 13, Grzybowska left her hometown and followed her brother to SMS Łódź, where she began training with Łódź's second team while receiving an education alongside other athletes. From 2016 to 2018, she helped contribute to four consecutive Polish junior championship titles.

== Club career ==
=== SMS Łódź ===
In 2018, Grzybowska was promoted to SMS Łódź's first team. She made her Ekstraliga debut near the end of the 2018–19 league season. She soon became a regular under coach Marek Chojnacki and went on to spend nearly nine years at Łódź, captaining the side near the end of her tenure. In December 2021, Grzybowska was named to the Ekstraliga's autumn best eleven for her performances throughout the first half of the season. In the second portion of the campaign, she helped Łódź win the Ekstraliga trophy after having been runners-up the previous year. The team was not able to replicate the same success the following season, finishing in third place.

In 2023, Grzybowska contributed to a Polish Cup title for Łódź and was named the best player of the championship match, a 5–0 victory over AP Orlen Gdańsk. Her final season with the club was the 2023–24 campaign, in which she scored 5 goals in 9 league matches and made her UEFA Women's Champions League debut in the qualification stage. She transferred away from Łódź halfway through the season, departing with six months remaining in her contract after the club expressed they were no longer interested in keeping Grzybowska on the roster moving forward. Grzybowska had also been stripped of her captaincy earlier that preseason.

=== GKS Katowice ===
Reigning Polish champions GKS Katowice signed Grzybowska in January 2024, penning her to a one-and-a-half year deal following her transfer away from Łódź. She spent the second half of the season with her new team before entering her first full year with GKS Katowice for the 2024–25 Ekstraliga. She helped Katowice achieve a successful, season which started with a multi-match win streak and culminated with a league title. Grzybowska recorded 4 goals and 1 assist in 19 matches, often operating centrally alongside Weronika Kaczor. At the end of the season, she did not renew her contract with Katowice; she departed from Poland having made 117 appearances in her home country.

=== Dijon ===
On 15 July 2025, French Première Ligue club Dijon FCO announced that they had signed Grzybowska to a one-year deal. The move added Grzybowska to a strong contingent of Polish players on Dijon's roster, including Oliwia Domin, Dominika Kopińska, and Nadia Krezyman. At the start of her first season abroad, she initially struggled to adapt to the heightened aggression in the Première Ligue in comparison to the Ekstraliga. After failing to score through the majority of the season, she netted her first goal for the club on 6 May 2026, chipping Les Marseillaises goalkeeper Margot Shore in a 1–0 victory on the final day of the season that lifted Dijon to sixth place in the league standings.

=== Nantes ===
On 16 July 2026, Grzybowska moved to fellow Première Ligue side Nantes on a two-year contract.

== International career ==
Grzybowska began representing Poland internationally at the youth international level. She scored her first career goal for the under-23 team in a 2–1 victory over Vietnam.

In November 2021, Grzybowska made her debut for the Poland senior team, participating in a 2023 FIFA Women's World Cup qualification match against Kosovo. Grzybowska was not named to Poland's squad for the 2025 UEFA Women's Euro, but later that year, she was reintroduced back into the national team following her move overseas to France.

== Career statistics ==
=== International ===
As of match played 9 June 2026

Appearances and goals by national team and year
National team	Year	Apps	Goals
Poland
Poland	2021	1	0
Poland	2026	4	0
Poland	2026	6	0
Total		11	0

== Honours ==
SMS Łódź

- Ekstraliga: 2021–22
- Polish Cup: 2022–23

GKS Katowice

- Ekstraliga: 2024–25
- Polish Cup: 2023–24
