= Paulina Tomasiak =

Polish association football player

Personal information
- Date of birth: 2 January 2002 (age 24)
- Position: Forward

Team information
- Current team: Bayer Leverkusen
- Number: 28

Youth career
- –2010: Poprad Rytro
- 2010–2015: UKS 3 Staszówka Jelna

Senior career*
Years	Team	Apps	(Gls)
2015–2025	UKS 3 Staszówka Jelna	123+	(163)
2025–2026	Górnik Łęczna	30	(10)
2026–	Bayer Leverkusen	8	(3)

International career^{‡}
2018–2019	Poland U17	8	(2)
2019–2020	Poland U19	8	(2)
2021–	Poland	21	(8)
- * Club domestic league appearances and goals as of 22:22, 20 November 2026 (UTC) ‡ National team caps and goals as of 22:22, 13 October 2026 (UTC)

Paulina Tomasiak (born 2 January 2002) is a Polish professional footballer who plays as a forward for Frauen-Bundesliga club Bayer Leverkusen and the Poland national team.

== Career statistics ==
=== Club ===
As of match played 20 November 2026

Appearances and goals by club, season and competition
Club	Season	League			National cup (Note: Includes Polish Cup, DFB-Pokal Frauen)		Europe		Other		Total	
Club	Season	Division	Apps	Goals	Apps	Goals	Apps	Goals	Apps	Goals	Apps	Goals
UKS 3 Staszówka Jelna	2015–16	III liga Les. Pol.		19	—		—		—			19
UKS 3 Staszówka Jelna	2016–17	III liga Les. Pol.		15	—		—		—			15
UKS 3 Staszówka Jelna	2017–18	II liga, group IV	15	12	1	1	—		—		16	13
UKS 3 Staszówka Jelna	2018–19	II liga, group IV	20	40	1	0	—		—		21	40
UKS 3 Staszówka Jelna	2019–20	II liga, group IV	7	16	2	2	—		1 (Note: Appearance in II liga promotion play-offs)	2	10	20
UKS 3 Staszówka Jelna	2020–21	I liga	18	18	4	5	—		—		22	23
UKS 3 Staszówka Jelna	2021–22	I liga	20	11	1	1	—		—		21	12
UKS 3 Staszówka Jelna	2022–23	I liga	13	11	0	0	—		—		13	11
UKS 3 Staszówka Jelna	2023–24	I liga	18	9	4	4	—		—		22	13
UKS 3 Staszówka Jelna	2024–25	I liga	11	10	1	0	—		—		12	10
UKS 3 Staszówka Jelna	Total		122	161	14	13	—		1	2	137	176
Górnik Łęczna	2024–25	Ekstraliga	9	3	1	2	—		—		10	5
Górnik Łęczna	2025–26	Ekstraliga	21	7	3	2	—		—		24	9
Górnik Łęczna	Total		30	10	4	4	—		—		34	14
Bayer Leverkusen	2026–27	Frauen-Bundesliga	8	3	1	0	—		—		9	3
Career total			160	174	19	17	—		1	2	180	193

=== International ===
As of match played 13 October 2026

Appearances and goals by national team and year
National team	Year	Apps	Goals
Poland	2021	1	0
Poland	2025	12	6
Poland	2026	8	2
Total		21	8

Scores and results list Poland's goal tally first, score column indicates score after each Tomasiak goal.

List of international goals scored by Paulina Tomasiak
No.	Date	Venue	Opponent	Score	Result	Competition
1	30 May 2025	Seaview, Belfast, Northern Ireland	Northern Ireland	3–0	4–0	2025 UEFA Nations League
2	3 June 2025	Gdańsk Stadium, Gdańsk, Poland	Romania	2–0	3–0	2025 UEFA Nations League
3	3 June 2025	Gdańsk Stadium, Gdańsk, Poland	Romania	3–0	3–0	2025 UEFA Nations League
4	27 June 2025	Stadion Stali Mielec, Mielec, Poland	Ukraine	2–0	4–0	Friendly
5	28 October 2025	Rodney Parade, Newport, Wales	Wales	4–2	5–2	Friendly
6	2 December 2025	Gdańsk Sports Center Stadium, Gdańsk, Poland	Latvia	2–0	3–0	Friendly
7	3 March 2026	Gdańsk Stadium, Gdańsk, Poland	Netherlands	2–2	2–2	2027 FIFA Women's World Cup qualification
8	13 October 2026	Gdańsk Stadium, Gdańsk, Poland	Belgium	2–1	3–2 (a.e.t.) (4–3 p)	2027 FIFA Women's World Cup qualification

== Honours ==
UKS 3 Staszówka Jelna

- II liga, group IV: 2019–20
- III liga Lesser Poland: 2016–17

Individual

- Polish Women's Newcomer of the Year: 2025
- Ekstraliga Player of the Season: 2025–26
- Ekstraliga Goal of the Season: 2025–26
