= Kinga Seweryn =

Polish footballer (born 2005)

Personal information
- Date of birth: 31 March 2005 (age 21)
- Place of birth: Olkusz, Poland
- Height: 1.72 m (5 ft 8 in)
- Position: Goalkeeper

Team information
- Current team: Paris FC
- Number: 22

Youth career
- Football Academy Olkusz
- –2019: Słowik Olkusz
- 2019–2020: GKS Katowice

Senior career*
Years	Team	Apps	(Gls)
2020–2026	GKS Katowice	70	(0)
2020	→ SWD Wodzisław Śląski (loan)	9	(0)
2021	→ ROW Rybnik (loan)	9	(0)
2026–	Paris FC	1	(0)

International career^{‡}
2019	Poland U15	2	(0)
2021–2022	Poland U17	6	(0)
2023–2024	Poland U19	18	(0)
2025–	Poland	5	(0)
- * Club domestic league appearances and goals as of 10:46, 6 October 2026 (UTC) ‡ National team caps and goals as of 22:37, 13 October 2026 (UTC)

Kinga Seweryn (born 31 March 2005) is a Polish professional footballer who plays as a goalkeeper for Première Ligue club Paris FC and the Poland national team.

== International career ==
Seweryn was part of the Poland's 23-player squad for the UEFA Women's Euro 2025 in Switzerland. She made her senior debut in a 5–2 friendly win over Wales on 28 October 2025.

== Career statistics ==
=== Club ===
As of match played 3 October 2026

Appearances and goals by club, season and competition
Club	Season	League			National cup (Note: Includes Polish Cup)		Europe		Other		Total	
Club	Season	Division	Apps	Goals	Apps	Goals	Apps	Goals	Apps	Goals	Apps	Goals
SWD Wodzisław Śląski (loan)	2020–21	I liga	9	0	1	0	—		—		10	0
ROW Rybnik (loan)	2020–21	Ekstraliga	9	0	1	0	—		—		10	0
GKS Katowice	2021–22	Ekstraliga	4	0	1	0	—		—		5	0
GKS Katowice	2022–23	Ekstraliga	11	0	0	0	—		—		11	0
GKS Katowice	2023–24	Ekstraliga	21	0	5	0	1 (Note: Appearance in UEFA Women's Champions League)	0	—		27	0
GKS Katowice	2024–25	Ekstraliga	20	0	1	0	—		—		21	0
GKS Katowice	2025–26	Ekstraliga	14	0	2	0	5 (Note: Three appearances in UEFA Women's Champions League, two appearances in UEFA Women's Europa Cup)	0	—		21	0
GKS Katowice	Total		70	0	9	0	6	0	—		85	0
Paris FC	2026–27	Première Ligue	1	0	0	0	0	0	—		1	0
Career total			89	0	11	0	6	0	—		106	0

=== International ===
As of match played 13 October 2026

Appearances and goals by national team and year
National team	Year	Apps	Goals
Poland
Poland	2025	1	0
Poland	2026	4	0
Total		5	0

== Honours ==
GKS Katowice

- Ekstraliga: 2022–23, 2024–25
- Polish Cup: 2023–24, 2025–26
