= Natalia Radkiewicz =

Polish footballer (born 2003)

Personal information
- Date of birth: 8 August 2003 (age 23)
- Place of birth: Słubice, Poland
- Height: 1.78 m (5 ft 10 in)
- Position: Goalkeeper

Team information
- Current team: Nantes
- Number: 99

Youth career
- TKKF Stilon Gorzów

Senior career*
Years	Team	Apps	(Gls)
2018–2019	TKKF Stilon Gorzów II	14	(0)
2019–2020	TKKF Stilon Gorzów	2	(0)
2020–2022	Olimpia Szczecin	23	(0)
2021	Olimpia Szczecin II	1	(0)
2022–2026	Pogoń Szczecin	50	(0)
2026–	Nantes	4	(0)

International career^{‡}
2021–2022	Poland U19	3	(0)
2023–2024	Poland U23	3	(0)
2025–	Poland	3	(0)
- * Club domestic league appearances and goals as of 10:21, 6 October 2026 (UTC) ‡ National team caps and goals as of 19:56, 2 December 2025 (UTC)

Natalia Radkiewicz (born 8 August 2003) is a Polish professional footballer who plays as a goalkeeper for Première Ligue club Nantes and the Poland national team.

== International career ==
Radkiewicz was part of the Poland's 23-player squad for the UEFA Women's Euro 2025 in Switzerland.

== Career statistics ==
=== Club ===
As of match played 3 October 2026

Appearances and goals by club, season and competition
Club	Season	League			National cup (Note: Includes Polish Cup)		Europe		Other		Total	
Club	Season	Division	Apps	Goals	Apps	Goals	Apps	Goals	Apps	Goals	Apps	Goals
TKKF Stilon Gorzów II	2018–19	III liga Lubusz	14	0	—		—		—		14	0
TKKF Stilon Gorzów	2018–19	II liga, gr. III	1	0	0	0	—		—		1	0
TKKF Stilon Gorzów	2019–20	II liga, gr. III	1	0	0	0	—		—		1	0
TKKF Stilon Gorzów	Total		2	0	0	0	—		—		2	0
Olimpia Szczecin	2020–21	Ekstraliga	1	0	0	0	—		—		1	0
Olimpia Szczecin	2021–22	Ekstraliga	22	0	1	0	—		—		23	0
Olimpia Szczecin	Total		23	0	1	0	—		—		24	0
Olimpia Szczecin II	2020–21	IV liga	1	0	—		—		—		1	0
Pogoń Szczecin	2022–23	Ekstraliga	16	0	2	0	—		—		11	0
Pogoń Szczecin	2023–24	Ekstraliga	1	0	0	0	—		—		27	0
Pogoń Szczecin	2024–25	Ekstraliga	14	0	0	0	1 (Note: Appearance in UEFA Women's Champions League)	0	—		15	0
Pogoń Szczecin	2025–26	Ekstraliga	19	0	0	0	—		—		19	0
Pogoń Szczecin	Total		50	0	2	0	1	0	—		53	0
Nantes	2026–27	Première Ligue	4	0	0	0	—		—		4	0
Career total			94	0	3	0	1	0	—		98	0

=== International ===
As of match played 2 December 2025

Appearances and goals by national team and year
National team	Year	Apps	Goals
Poland	2025	3	0
Total		3	0

== Honours ==
Pogoń Szczecin

- Ekstraliga: 2023–24
