= Kornelia Grosicka =

Polish footballer

Personal information
- Date of birth: 23 June 1999 (age 27)
- Place of birth: Szczecin, Poland
- Positions: Midfielder; winger

Team information
- Current team: Legia Warsaw
- Number: 6

Senior career*
| Years | Team | Apps | (Gls) |
| 2011–2017 | Błękitni Stargard | | |
| 2017–2021 | Olimpia Szczecin | 149 | (37) |
| 2021–2023 | Czarni Sosnowiec | 33 | (4) |
| 2023–2024 | SV Meppen | 26 | (7) |
| 2024–2025 | Turbine Potsdam | 9 | (0) |
| 2025 | Apollon | | |
| 2025– | Legia Warsaw | 18 | (6) |
- * Club domestic league appearances and goals as of 21:50, 2 June 2026 (UTC)

Kornelia Grosicka (born 23 June 1999) is a Polish professional footballer who plays as a winger or forward for Ekstraliga club Legia Warsaw.

== Career ==
Grosicka started her career at Błękitni Stargard in 2011, winning promotion to the top flight in 2016, aged 17, in an unbeaten season for the club. She moved to Olimpia Szczecin in 2017, becoming a leading player at the club. She made 149 Ekstraliga appearances for Olimpia, scoring 37 goals.

In 2021, Grosicka joined Czarni Sosnowiec. With Czarni, she contributed to winning the Ekstraliga title in the 2020–21 season and secured two consecutive Polish Cup victories in the 2020–21 and 2021–22 seasons. She made 33 domestic league appearances, scoring four goals during this time. This period also saw her make one appearance in the UEFA Women's Champions League in August 2021.

In 2023, Grosicka moved to Germany, joining SV Meppen for the 2023–24 season. During her time there, she primarily played as a forward, making 26 appearances and scoring seven goals in the 2. Bundesliga. She also featured for SV Meppen II. Her subsequent transfer to Turbine Potsdam occurred in July 2024, where she played until January 2025. For Turbine, she made nine appearances in the Bundesliga, though she did not score during this period.

On 11 January 2025, Grosicka signed with Cypriot side Apollon. Expected to strengthen the club's offensive line, which had already scored 35 goals in 10 league matches prior to her arrival, the transfer aligned with her stated long-term career aspiration to play for a leading foreign club.

On 18 July 2025, Grosicka returned to Poland to join second tier club Legia Warsaw.

== Style of play ==
Grosicka is predominantly right-footed and her greatest attributes are said to be pace and shot power. She started playing at a young age.

== Personal life ==
She is the sister of the Polish international Kamil Grosicki.

== Honours ==
Czarni Sosnowiec

- Ekstraliga: 2020–21
- Polish Cup: 2020–21, 2021–22

Apollon Ladies

- Cypriot First Division: 2024–25
- Cypriot Cup: 2024–25

Legia Warsaw

- I liga: 2025–26
