= Ellie Christon =

English footballer (born 1993)

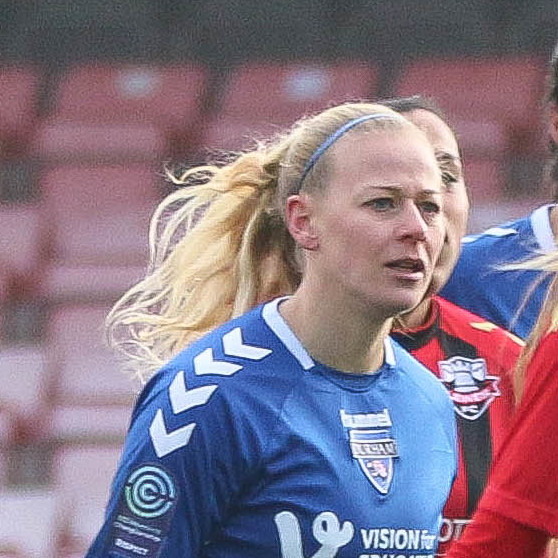
- Christon playing for Durham in 2021

Personal information
- Full name: Ellie Christon
- Date of birth: 21 September 1993 (age 33)
- Place of birth: Middlesbrough, England
- Position: Centre-back

Team information
- Current team: Middlesbrough

Youth career
- 2001–2005: Norton & Stockton Ancients
- 2005–2009: Middlesbrough

Senior career*
Years	Team	Apps	(Gls)
2009–2014	Sunderland	36	(0)
2014–2018	Durham	71	(1)
2018	Genesee		
2018–2023	Durham	117	(1)
2024–2026	Orlen Gdańsk	20	(0)
2026–	Middlesbrough	0	(0)
- * Club domestic league appearances and goals ‡ National team caps and goals as of 23 June 2026 (UTC)

Ellie Christon (born 21 September 1993) is an English footballer who plays as a centre-back for National League North club Middlesbrough.

== Early life ==
Christon joined Norton & Stockton Ancients in 2001 at the age of eight, before joining Middlesbrough's centre of excellence at the age of twelve. During her time with Middlesbrough she was scouted by England.

== Club career ==
=== Sunderland ===
Christon joined Sunderland in 2009, making her debut on 4 April 2010, as a substitute against Everton. She was part of the team that won both the 2011–12 FA Women's Premier League, and the 2011–12 FA Women's Premier League Cup.

=== Durham ===
In 2014 Christon turned professional, signing with Women's Super League 2 side Durham. She started in the club's first ever professional league fixture, against former club Sunderland, on 17 April. She scored her first goal for the club on 26 October 2014, during a 1–1 draw with Yeovil Town.

In 2018 Christon joined United Women's Soccer side Genesee. The club was short lived and folded after one season. Christon subsequently rejoined Durham. She scored in the fifth round of the FA Cup on 18 February 2018, during a 5–2 win against Leicester City, and was voted 2018–19 Player of the Year. Christon became the club's third player to make 150 appearances. In 2021 she signed a new contract, keeping her at the club until 2023.

=== Orlen Gdańsk ===
In 2024 Christon joined Ekstraliga side Orlen Gdańsk. She scored her first goal for the club on 16 November 2024, during an 8–1 win against Górnik Zabrze in the Polish Cup. She scored again in the Polish Cup on 24 April 2025, in a 4–1 semi-final loss against eventual champions Czarni Sosnowiec. She signed a new contract with the club for the 2025–26 season.

=== Middlesbrough ===
On 22 June 2026, Middlesbrough announced the signing of Christon.

== Honours ==
Sunderland

- Women's Premier League: 2010–11, 2011–12, 2012–13
- Women's Premier League Cup: 2011–12

Individual

- Durham Player of the Year: 2018–19
