= Nikol Kaletka =

Polish footballer

Personal information
- Date of birth: 6 February 1995 (age 31)
- Place of birth: Poland
- Position: Forward

Team information
- Current team: Czarni Sosnowiec
- Number: 17

Youth career
- Atena Cerekiew
- Czarni Gorzyce
- 2013–2014: Czarne Swierklany
- 2014: KŚ AZS Wrocław

Senior career*
Years	Team	Apps	(Gls)
2013	Czarni Gorzyce		
2014–2017	Czarni Sosnowiec		
2017–2021	Medyk Konin	74	(29)
2021–	Czarni Sosnowiec	103	(37)
2026	Czarni Sosnowiec II	1	(2)

International career^{‡}
2010–2012	Poland U17	11	(2)
2012–2014	Poland U19	9	(2)
2014–	Poland	48	(6)
- * Club domestic league appearances and goals as of 22:04, 2 June 2026 (UTC) ‡ National team caps and goals as of 23 November 2024

Nikol Kaletka (born 6 February 1995) is a Polish professional footballer who plays as a forward for Ekstraliga club Czarni Sosnowiec.

== Career statistics ==
=== International ===
As of match played 9 October 2022

Appearances and goals by national team and year
National team	Year	Apps	Goals
Poland	2014	5	2
Poland	2015	10	0
Poland	2016	12	2
Poland	2017	2	1
Poland	2018	3	0
Poland	2019	3	1
Poland	2021	7	0
Poland	2022	6	0
Total		48	6

== Honours ==
Medyk Konin

- Polish Cup: 2018–19

Czarni Sosnowiec

- Ekstraliga: 2025–26
- Polish Cup: 2021–22, 2024–25
