= 2025 UEFA Women's Under-19 Championship squads =

Player listing of women's football competition

Each national team submitted a squad of 20 players, two of whom had to be goalkeepers.

Players born on or after 1 January 2006 were eligible to participate. The age listed for each player is their age as of 15 June 2025, the first day of the tournament.

== Group A ==
=== France ===
The final squad was announced on 4 June 2025.

Head coach: Philippe Joly

No.	Pos.	Player	Date of birth (age)	Club
1	GK	Alyssa Fernandes	1 January 2006 (aged 19)	(France) PSG
16	GK	Ceylin Yilmaz	9 March 2007 (aged 18)	(France) Montpellier
2	DF	Céleste Delcroix	30 April 2006 (aged 19)	(France) Lille
3	DF	Taeryne Job	10 July 2006 (aged 18)	(France) Saint-Étienne
4	DF	Célia Delaby	20 December 2006 (aged 18)	(France) Lille
5	DF	Wassa Sangaré	16 March 2006 (aged 19)	(France) Le Havre
12	DF	Lou Autin	25 January 2006 (aged 19)	(France) Guingamp
13	DF	Aude Bizet	14 March 2006 (aged 19)	(France) Fleury
6	MF	Julie Swierot	14 March 2006 (aged 19)	(France) Stade de Reims
8	MF	Maeline Mendy	26 December 2006 (aged 18)	(France) Strasbourg
10	MF	Mélinda Mendy	21 December 2006 (aged 18)	(France) Le Havre
14	MF	Kenza Dufour	3 August 2007 (aged 17)	(France) Paris FC
15	MF	Landryna Lushimba Bilombi	14 March 2006 (aged 19)	(Switzerland) Servette
18	MF	Rosalie Chaine	7 February 2007 (aged 18)	(France) Montpellier
7	FW	Chancelle Effa Effa	14 September 2006 (aged 18)	(France) Le Havre
9	FW	Liana Joseph	15 August 2006 (aged 18)	(France) Strasbourg
11	FW	Naolia Traoré	22 January 2006 (aged 19)	(France) PSG
17	FW	Justine Rouquet	6 June 2007 (aged 18)	(France) Montpellier
19	FW	Célia Chabod	28 February 2007 (aged 18)	(France) Montpellier
20	FW	Ornella Graziani	19 August 2007 (aged 17)	(France) PSG

=== Italy ===
The final squad was announced on 4 June 2025.

Head coach: Nicola Matteucci

No.	Pos.	Player	Date of birth (age)	Club
1	GK	Emma Mustafic	11 October 2006 (aged 18)	(Italy) Juventus
12	GK	Elena Belli	10 April 2006 (aged 19)	(Italy) Cesena
2	DF	Lidia Consolini	15 February 2007 (aged 18)	(Italy) Inter
3	DF	Elena Pizzuti	11 September 2006 (aged 18)	(Italy) Roma
4	DF	Martina Cocino	27 July 2006 (aged 18)	(Italy) Juventus
5	DF	Azzurra Gallo	20 May 2006 (aged 19)	(Italy) Juventus
13	DF	Martina Tosello	26 December 2007 (aged 17)	(Italy) Juventus
14	DF	Carolina Bertora	24 January 2007 (aged 18)	(Italy) Juventus
15	DF	Emma Lombardi	20 September 2007 (aged 17)	(Italy) Fiorentina
6	MF	Maya Cherubini	14 May 2007 (aged 18)	(Italy) Fiorentina
8	MF	Paola Fadda	5 January 2006 (aged 19)	(Italy) Inter
11	MF	Manuela Perselli	1 September 2006 (aged 18)	(Italy) Sassuolo
16	MF	Martina Cherubini	23 May 2006 (aged 19)	(Italy) Roma
17	MF	Marta Zamboni	5 August 2006 (aged 18)	(Italy) Juventus
7	FW	Emma Girotto	2 February 2006 (aged 19)	(Italy) Sassuolo
9	FW	Eleonora Ferraresi	7 May 2007 (aged 18)	(Italy) Juventus
10	FW	Giada Pellegrino Cimò	7 October 2006 (aged 18)	(Italy) Sampdoria
18	FW	Rosanna Ventriglia	13 December 2007 (aged 17)	(Italy) Roma
19	FW	Manuela Sciabica	19 June 2006 (aged 18)	(Italy) Napoli
20	FW	Carolina Tironi	19 July 2006 (aged 18)	(Italy) Cesena

=== Poland ===
The final squad was announced on 2 June 2025.

Head coach: Marcin Kasprowicz

No.	Pos.	Player	Date of birth (age)	Club
1	GK	Julia Woźniak	15 April 2007 (aged 18)	(Poland) Czarni Sosnowiec
12	GK	Sandra Urbańczyk	25 April 2007 (aged 18)	(Poland) Górnik Łęczna
2	DF	Oliwia Łapińska	9 February 2007 (aged 18)	(Poland) AP Orlen Gdańsk
4	DF	Magda Piekarska	9 September 2007 (aged 17)	(Poland) Rekord Bielsko-Biała
5	DF	Emilia Sobierajska	22 August 2007 (aged 17)	(Poland) Pogoń Tczew
6	DF	Iga Witkowska	27 March 2007 (aged 18)	(Poland) Rekord Bielsko-Biała
13	DF	Zofia Pągowska	25 April 2007 (aged 18)	(Poland) UKS SMS Łódź
14	DF	Jagoda Cyraniak	23 May 2006 (aged 19)	(Poland) GKS Katowice
18	DF	Martyna Bartczak	25 June 2007 (aged 17)	(Poland) KKP Bydgoszcz
3	MF	Julia Przybył	12 July 2007 (aged 17)	(Poland) Lech Poznań
7	MF	Krystyna Flis	4 January 2007 (aged 18)	(Italy) Juventus
8	MF	Zuzanna Witek	19 September 2007 (aged 17)	(Poland) Czarni Sosnowiec
10	MF	Maja Zielińska	11 August 2007 (aged 17)	(Germany) Wolfsburg
11	MF	Paulina Guzik	13 June 2006 (aged 19)	(Poland) Śląsk Wrocław
15	MF	Weronika Araśniewicz	15 March 2008 (aged 17)	(Spain) Barcelona
20	MF	Inez Sikora	23 March 2006 (aged 19)	(Poland) Górnik Łęczna
9	FW	Julia Gutowska	17 February 2006 (aged 19)	(Poland) Rekord Bielsko-Biała
16	FW	Zuzanna Grzywińska	23 June 2006 (aged 18)	(Poland) Czarni Sosnowiec
17	FW	Nina Abe	18 July 2007 (aged 17)	(Poland) Pogoń Tczew
19	FW	Kinga Wyrwas	21 January 2007 (aged 18)	(Poland) Śląsk Wrocław

=== Sweden ===
The final squad was announced on 26 May 2025.

Head coach: Annelie Norén

No.	Pos.	Player	Date of birth (age)	Club
1	GK	Saga Andersson	25 July 2007 (aged 17)	(Sweden) Rosengård
12	GK	Julia Cavander	10 December 2006 (aged 18)	(Sweden) Malmö
2	MF	Annika Svensson	9 August 2006 (aged 18)	(Sweden) Djurgården
3	MF	Thindra Mattsson	22 October 2007 (aged 17)	(Sweden) Uppsala
4	DF	Vera Andersson	1 October 2006 (aged 18)	(Sweden) Örebro
5	DF	Mikaela Stojanovska	28 November 2006 (aged 18)	(Sweden) Rosengård
13	DF	Stina Dahlman	18 October 2006 (aged 18)	(Sweden) Örebro
17	DF	Olivia Crona	24 August 2006 (aged 18)	(Sweden) Örebro
6	MF	Alexandra Larsson	8 June 2006 (aged 19)	(Sweden) Häcken
7	MF	Novalie Jensen	18 March 2006 (aged 19)	(Sweden) Häcken
8	MF	Emma Broddheimer	7 October 2006 (aged 18)	(Sweden) Kristianstad
11	MF	Ida Björnberg	31 December 2006 (aged 18)	(Sweden) Örebro
14	MF	Olivia Ländin Sjöblom	18 April 2006 (aged 19)	(Sweden) Djurgården
15	MF	Saga Fredgren	2 February 2006 (aged 19)	(Sweden) Alingsås
18	MF	Nathalie Staaf	1 January 2007 (aged 18)	(Sweden) Häcken
19	MF	Lykke Ihrfelt	31 March 2006 (aged 19)	(Sweden) Hammarby
9	FW	Thelma Persson Welin	28 January 2008 (aged 17)	(Sweden) Trelleborg
10	FW	Hannah Sjödahl	26 June 2006 (aged 18)	(Sweden) Vittsjö
16	FW	Tilde Björklund	30 March 2006 (aged 19)	(Sweden) Rosengård
20	FW	Ella Lundin	21 August 2007 (aged 17)	(Sweden) Häcken

== Group B ==
=== England ===
The final squad was announced on 10 June 2025.

Head coach: (Wales) Lauren Smith

No.	Pos.	Player	Date of birth (age)	Club
1	GK	Katie Cox	28 April 2006 (aged 19)	(England) Chelsea
13	GK	Eve Annets	19 March 2006 (aged 19)	(England) Manchester City
2	DF	Nelly Las	17 December 2007 (aged 17)	(England) Leicester City
3	DF	Mari Ward	3 January 2006 (aged 19)	(England) Bristol City
5	DF	Lucy Newell	2 October 2006 (aged 18)	(England) Manchester United
6	DF	Katie Reid	25 September 2006 (aged 18)	(England) Arsenal
17	DF	Rachel Maltby	25 March 2007 (aged 18)	(England) Aston Villa
18	DF	Chloe Sarwie	19 December 2008 (aged 16)	(England) Chelsea
20	DF	Cecily Wellesley-Smith	4 January 2007 (aged 18)	(England) Arsenal
4	MF	Laila Harbert	3 January 2007 (aged 18)	(England) Arsenal
8	MF	Lexi Potter	17 August 2006 (aged 18)	(England) Chelsea
10	MF	Lola Brown	31 October 2007 (aged 17)	(England) Chelsea
11	MF	Vivienne Lia	27 September 2006 (aged 18)	(England) Arsenal
12	MF	Erica Parkinson	18 April 2008 (aged 17)	(Portugal) Valadares Gaia
14	MF	Lauryn Thompson	4 November 2007 (aged 17)	(United States) Indy Eleven
15	MF	Maddy Earl	3 November 2006 (aged 18)	(England) Arsenal
7	FW	Ava Baker	9 January 2006 (aged 19)	(England) Birmingham City
9	FW	Princess Ademiluyi	14 July 2006 (aged 18)	(England) West Ham United
16	FW	Araya Dennis	11 January 2006 (aged 19)	(England) Tottenham Hotspur
19	FW	Jessie Gale	23 August 2006 (aged 18)	(England) Arsenal

=== Netherlands ===
The final squad was announced on 11 June 2025.

Head coach: Roos Kwakkenbos

No.	Pos.	Player	Date of birth (age)	Club
1	GK	Danae van der Vliet	6 February 2007 (aged 18)	(Netherlands) Ajax
16	GK	Netty Booms	25 October 2006 (aged 18)	(Netherlands) AZ
2	DF	Liv Rademaker	21 April 2006 (aged 19)	(Netherlands) Ajax
3	DF	Anissa Chibani	11 April 2006 (aged 19)	(Netherlands) PSV
4	DF	Aline Weereits	8 October 2008 (aged 16)	(Netherlands) Utrecht
5	DF	Inske Weiman	23 August 2006 (aged 18)	(Netherlands) Zwolle
12	DF	Pleun Groot	19 September 2006 (aged 18)	(Netherlands) AZ
13	DF	Lucy Heij	15 May 2006 (aged 19)	(Netherlands) Feyenoord
15	DF	Kyra Koopman	29 March 2007 (aged 18)	(Netherlands) Utrecht
6	MF	Jasmijn van Uden	22 January 2006 (aged 19)	(Netherlands) AZ
8	MF	Ilse Kemper	20 June 2006 (aged 18)	(Netherlands) Zwolle
10	MF	Jade van Hensbergen	18 April 2006 (aged 19)	(Netherlands) Ajax
14	MF	Sophie Proost	11 March 2007 (aged 18)	(Netherlands) Twente
18	MF	Sophie van Vugt	24 April 2006 (aged 19)	(Netherlands) Zwolle
7	FW	Rose Ivens	21 December 2007 (aged 17)	(Netherlands) Twente
9	FW	Eva Oude Elberink	13 April 2006 (aged 19)	(Netherlands) Twente
11	FW	Bo van Egmond	13 November 2006 (aged 18)	(Netherlands) Ajax
17	FW	Zoë Zuidberg	29 March 2007 (aged 18)	(Netherlands) Zwolle
19	FW	Mirte van Koppen	13 April 2006 (aged 19)	(Netherlands) Ajax
20	FW	Xanne Kip	30 March 2006 (aged 19)	(Netherlands) Ajax

=== Portugal ===
The final squad was announced on 6 June 2025.

Head coach: Marisa Gomes

No.	Pos.	Player	Date of birth (age)	Club
1	GK	Thaís Lima	11 April 2008 (aged 17)	(Portugal) Benfica
12	GK	Nair Pina	25 November 2006 (aged 18)	(Portugal) Torreense
2	DF	Iara Lobo	16 January 2008 (aged 17)	(Spain) Barcelona
3	DF	Inês Meninas	16 May 2006 (aged 19)	(Portugal) Benfica
4	DF	Érica Cancelinha	26 December 2006 (aged 18)	(Portugal) Sporting
5	DF	Ana Ribeiro	15 April 2006 (aged 19)	(Portugal) Albergaria
6	MF	Joana Valente	3 January 2007 (aged 18)	(Portugal) Benfica
7	MF	Marta Gago	24 January 2006 (aged 19)	(Portugal) Benfica
8	FW	Anna Marques	27 May 2006 (aged 19)	(Germany) Bochum
10	MF	Mafalda Mariano	3 January 2006 (aged 19)	(Portugal) Benfica
13	FW	Carolina Santiago	31 August 2006 (aged 18)	(Portugal) Valadares Gaia
15	MF	Dária Kaminska	5 September 2006 (aged 18)	(Portugal) Sporting
19	MF	Ana Cunha	24 August 2006 (aged 18)	(Portugal) Braga
23	MF	Carolina Tristão	20 November 2008 (aged 16)	(Portugal) Benfica
9	FW	Diana Costa	25 May 2006 (aged 19)	(Portugal) Benfica
11	FW	Matilde Nave	17 November 2007 (aged 17)	(Portugal) Sporting
16	FW	Luísa Brás	19 February 2006 (aged 19)	(France) Metz
17	FW	Maísa Correia	11 October 2006 (aged 18)	(Portugal) Sporting
21	FW	Francisca Castro	10 July 2008 (aged 16)	(Portugal) Braga
20	FW	Lara Martins	1 October 2006 (aged 18)	(Portugal) Benfica

=== Spain ===
The final squad was announced on 3 June 2025.

Head coach: Javier Lerga

No.	Pos.	Player	Date of birth (age)	Club
1	GK	Laia López	29 January 2007 (aged 18)	(Spain) Real Madrid
13	GK	Julia Arrula	29 January 2006 (aged 19)	(Spain) Real Sociedad
3	DF	María Llorella	14 May 2006 (aged 19)	(Spain) Barcelona
4	DF	Emma Gálvez	19 April 2006 (aged 19)	(Spain) Barcelona
5	DF	Amaya García	10 June 2007 (aged 18)	(Spain) Real Madrid
7	DF	Noemí Bejarano	27 June 2006 (aged 18)	(Spain) Real Madrid
12	DF	Aïcha Camara	11 December 2006 (aged 18)	(Spain) Barcelona
17	DF	Emma Moreno	2 May 2007 (aged 18)	(Spain) Atlético Madrid
22	DF	Aiara Agirrezabala	2 October 2008 (aged 16)	(Spain) Real Sociedad
6	MF	Irune Dorado	22 March 2008 (aged 17)	(Spain) Real Madrid
8	MF	Ainoa Gómez	13 April 2007 (aged 18)	(Spain) Barcelona
10	MF	Cristina Librán	11 January 2006 (aged 19)	(Spain) Madrid CFF
14	MF	Daniela Arques	21 March 2006 (aged 19)	(Spain) Levante
16	MF	Clara Serrajordi	7 December 2007 (aged 17)	(Spain) Barcelona
9	FW	Marísa García	22 June 2006 (aged 18)	(Spain) Real Madrid
11	FW	Daniela Agote	27 August 2006 (aged 18)	(Spain) Athletic Bilbao
18	MF	Elene Gurtubay	3 October 2007 (aged 17)	(Spain) Athletic Bilbao
19	FW	Alba Cerrato	1 January 2007 (aged 18)	(Spain) Sevilla
20	FW	Paula Comendador	12 January 2007 (aged 18)	(Spain) Real Madrid
21	FW	Celia Segura	10 March 2007 (aged 18)	(Spain) Barcelona
