= Oliwia Szperkowska =

Polish footballer (born 2001)

Personal information
- Date of birth: 27 August 2001 (age 25)
- Place of birth: Wałcz, Poland
- Position: Goalkeeper

Team information
- Current team: Paris Saint-Germain

Youth career
- –2014: Orzeł Wałcz

Senior career*
Years	Team	Apps	(Gls)
2014–2017	Orzeł Wałcz		
2018–2020	UKS SMS Łódź II	15	(0)
2018–2023	UKS SMS Łódź	89	(0)
2023–2024	Czarni Sosnowiec	11	(0)
2024–	Paris Saint-Germain	2	(0)
2024–2025	→ Birmingham City (loan)	3	(0)
2025–2026	→ Czarni Sosnowiec (loan)	22	(0)

International career^{‡}
2018–2020	Poland U19	10	(0)
2023	Poland U23	1	(0)
2025–	Poland	1	(0)
- * Club domestic league appearances and goals as of 20:00, 2 June 2026 (UTC) ‡ National team caps and goals as of 19:57, 2 December 2025 (UTC)

Oliwia Szperkowska (born 27 August 2001) is a Polish professional footballer who plays as a goalkeeper for Première Ligue club Paris Saint-Germain and the Poland national team.

Szperkowska has previously played for Orzeł Wałcz, UKS SMS Łódź and Czarni Sosnowiec in her native Poland, and for Birmingham City in England.

== Career statistics ==
=== International ===
As of match played 2 December 2025

Appearances and goals by national team and year
National team	Year	Apps	Goals
Poland	2025	1	0
Total		1	0

== Honours ==
UKS SMS Łódź

- Ekstraliga: 2021–22
- Polish Cup: 2022–23

Czarni Sosnowiec

- Ekstraliga: 2025–26

Individual

- Ekstraliga Goalkeeper of the Season: 2025–26
