= Anna Rędzia =

Polish footballer

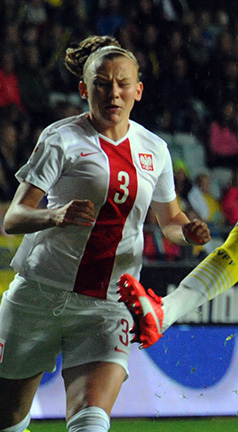
- Rędzia with Poland in 2015

Personal information
- Date of birth: 2 October 1996 (age 30)
- Place of birth: Poland
- Position: Midfielder

Team information
- Current team: Górnik Łęczna
- Number: 9

Youth career
- –2009: Górnik Łęczna
- 2009–2012: Zamłynie ZA Kombud Radom
- 2012–2014: Czwórka Radom

Senior career*
Years	Team	Apps	(Gls)
2014–2015	UKS SMS Łódź		
2015–2019	AZS PWSZ Wałbrzych		
2019–2023	UKS SMS Łódź	75	(34)
2023–2024	Czarni Sosnowiec	12	(3)
2024–	Górnik Łęczna	29	(13)

International career
2011–2013	Poland U17	17	(0)
2013–2014	Poland U19	8	(0)
2014–2021	Poland	16	(0)
Medal record
Representing Poland
Women's football
UEFA Women's Under-17 Championship
Winner	2013 Switzerland
- * Club domestic league appearances and goals as of 21:43, 2 June 2026 (UTC)

Anna Rędzia (born 2 October 1996) is a Polish professional footballer who plays as a midfielder for Ekstraliga club Górnik Łęczna.

== Career statistics ==
=== International ===
Appearances and goals by national team and year
National team	Year	Apps	Goals
Poland	2014	1	0
Poland	2015	6	0
Poland	2016	2	0
Poland	2018	2	0
Poland	2020	3	0
Poland	2021	2	0
Total		16	0

== Honours ==
UKS SMS Łódź

- Ekstraliga: 2021–22
- Polish Cup: 2022–23

Poland U17

- UEFA Women's Under-17 Championship: 2013
