= Anna Żelazko =

Polish footballer (born 1983)

Personal information
- Full name: Anna Żelazko
- Date of birth: 15 April 1983 (age 43)
- Place of birth: Poland
- Position: Striker

Senior career*
Years	Team	Apps	(Gls)
2000–2005	Czarni Sosnowiec		
2005–2009	AZS Wrocław		(70)
2009–2013	Unia Racibórz		(63)
2014–2015	Górnik Łęczna		(11)

International career
2001–2013	Poland	79	(27)
- * Club domestic league appearances and goals

Anna Żelazko (born 15 April 1983) is a Polish former professional footballer who played as a striker. She played for Czarni Sosnowiec, AZS Wrocław, Unia Racibórz and Górnik Łęczna. Żelazko has won seven championships with AZS and Unia, and she was the season's top scorer in 2005, 2007, 2009 and 2014.

She was a member of the Polish national team from 2001 to 2013.

== Career statistics ==
=== International ===
Appearances and goals by national team and year
National team	Year	Apps	Goals
Poland	2001	7	0
Poland	2002	4	0
Poland	2003	4	1
Poland	2004	6	1
Poland	2005	3	3
Poland	2006	4	4
Poland	2007	7	5
Poland	2008	9	0
Poland	2009	11	2
Poland	2010	9	0
Poland	2011	8	7
Poland	2012	5	4
Poland	2013	1	0
Total		79	27

== Honours ==
Czarni Sosnowiec

- Polish Cup: 2000–01, 2001–02

AZS Wrocław

- Ekstraliga: 2005–06, 2006–07, 2007–08
- Polish Cup: 2006–07, 2008–09

Unia Racibórz

- Ekstraliga: 2009–10, 2010–11, 2011–12, 2012–13
- Polish Cup: 2009–10, 2010–11, 2011–12

Individual

- Ekstraliga top scorer: 2004–05, 2006–07, 2008–09, 2013–14
- Polish Cup top scorer: 2009–10
