= Klaudia Jedlińska =

Polish footballer (born 2000)

Personal information
- Date of birth: 9 February 2000 (age 26)
- Place of birth: Bełchatów, Poland
- Height: 1.63 m (5 ft 4 in)
- Position: Forward

Team information
- Current team: Paris FC
- Number: 20

Youth career
- SMS Łódź

Senior career*
Years	Team	Apps	(Gls)
2017–2023	UKS Łódź	111	(37)
2023–2025	Dijon	38	(15)
2025–	Paris FC	15	(3)

International career^{‡}
2017–2019	Poland U19	9	(1)
2023	Poland U23	1	(0)
2021–	Poland	17	(2)
- * Club domestic league appearances and goals as of 19:50, 2 June 2026 (UTC) ‡ National team caps and goals as of 19:44, 14 April 2026 (UTC)

Klaudia Jedlińska (born 9 February 2000) is a Polish professional footballer who plays as a forward for Première Ligue club Paris FC and the Poland national team.

== Career statistics ==
=== International ===
As of match played 14 April 2026

Appearances and goals by national team and year
National team	Year	Apps	Goals
Poland	2021	2	0
Poland	2022	1	0
Poland	2023	2	0
Poland	2024	5	0
Poland	2025	6	2
Poland	2026	1	0
Total		17	2

Scores and results list Poland's goal tally first, score column indicates score after each Jedlińska goal.

List of international goals scored by Klaudia Jedlińska
No.	Date	Venue	Opponent	Score	Result	Competition
1	27 June 2025	Stadion Stali Mielec, Mielec, Poland	Ukraine	1–0	4–0	Friendly
2	28 October 2025	Rodney Parade, Newport, Wales	Wales	5–2	5–2	Friendly

== Honours ==
UKS SMS Łódź

- Ekstraliga: 2021–22
- Polish Cup: 2022–23
