= Lech Poznań (women) =

Lech Poznań UAM
- Full name: KKS Lech Poznań UAM
- Nickname: Kolejorz (The Railwayman)
- Short name: Lech Poznań
- Founded: 26 August 2021; 5 years ago
- Ground: Plewiska GOSiR Stadium
- Manager: Alicja Zając
- League: Ekstraliga
- 2025–26: Ekstraliga, 8th of 12
- Website: lechpoznan.pl
Home colours	Away colours

Lech Poznań UAM is a Polish women's association football club based in Poznań. It is the women's football section of Lech Poznań and was established in 2021 through cooperation between Lech Poznań and Adam Mickiewicz University in Poznań (UAM). The team competes in the Orlen Ekstraliga, the highest level of women's football in Poland.

The club began competing in the III liga in the 2021–22 season and earned promotion in its first campaign. It subsequently earned three promotions in its first four seasons, reaching the Ekstraliga in 2025. In its first Ekstraliga season, 2025–26, Lech Poznań UAM finished eighth and reached the semifinals of the Polish Cup.

== History ==
=== Establishment ===
Lech Poznań announced the establishment of its women's football section on 26 August 2021 in cooperation with Adam Mickiewicz University in Poznań. Alicja Zając was appointed head coach, and the team was scheduled to play most of its III liga home matches at the UAM Morasko Campus.

The team made its competitive debut in August 2021. Lech Poznań UAM subsequently finished first in its III liga group and earned promotion to the second tier.

=== Rise through the league system ===
Lech Poznań UAM competed in the II liga during the 2022–23 season. The team finished the campaign with one defeat and two draws and earned promotion to the I liga.

The 2023–24 season was the club's first in the I liga. Lech Poznań UAM finished third, narrowly missing promotion to the Ekstraliga. In the final match of the season, the team defeated Trójka Staszkówka/Jelna 4–2 to secure third place.

During the 2024–25 season, Lech Poznań UAM secured promotion to the Ekstraliga with a 6–0 victory over KKP Bydgoszcz on 4 May 2025. The result confirmed promotion with two matches remaining in the season. Lech ultimately finished second in the I liga, behind KS UJ Kraków.

=== Ekstraliga debut ===
Lech Poznań UAM made its Ekstraliga debut on 9 August 2025, defeating Stomil Olsztyn 1–0. Julia Przybył scored the club's first goal in the top division.

In its debut 2025–26 Ekstraliga season, Lech finished eighth in the league. The club recorded seven wins, five draws and ten defeats in its 22 league matches and secured its place in the top division for the following season.

The club also reached the semifinals of the Polish Cup for the first time. Lech advanced to the semifinal without conceding a goal, defeating Iskra Tarnów 4–0, Polonia Środa Wielkopolska 5–0, KKP Warsaw 5–0 and Górnik Łęczna 1–0.

In the semifinal, played at Enea Stadion on 21 April 2026, Lech lost 5–0 to GKS Katowice. The match attracted 8,311 spectators, setting a record attendance for a women's club football match in Poland.

== Colours and crest ==
Lech Poznań UAM uses the traditional blue and white colours associated with Lech Poznań. The team operates under the Lech Poznań name and uses the club's crest.

== Stadium ==
The team's first home matches were played at facilities associated with Adam Mickiewicz University in Poznań, including the UAM Morasko Campus.

During the 2025–26 Ekstraliga season, the team played its home league matches at GOSiR Stadium in Plewiska. Selected high-profile matches have also been played at Enea Stadion, including the 2026 Polish Cup semifinal against GKS Katowice.

== Managerial history ==
- (Poland) Alicja Zając (2021–present)

== Honours ==
- I liga
  - Runners-up: 2024–25
- II liga North
  - Champions: 2022–23
- III liga, group II
  - Champions: 2021–22

== See also ==
- Lech Poznań
- Ekstraliga (women's football)
- Polish Women's Cup
