= Karlīna Miksone =

Latvian footballer

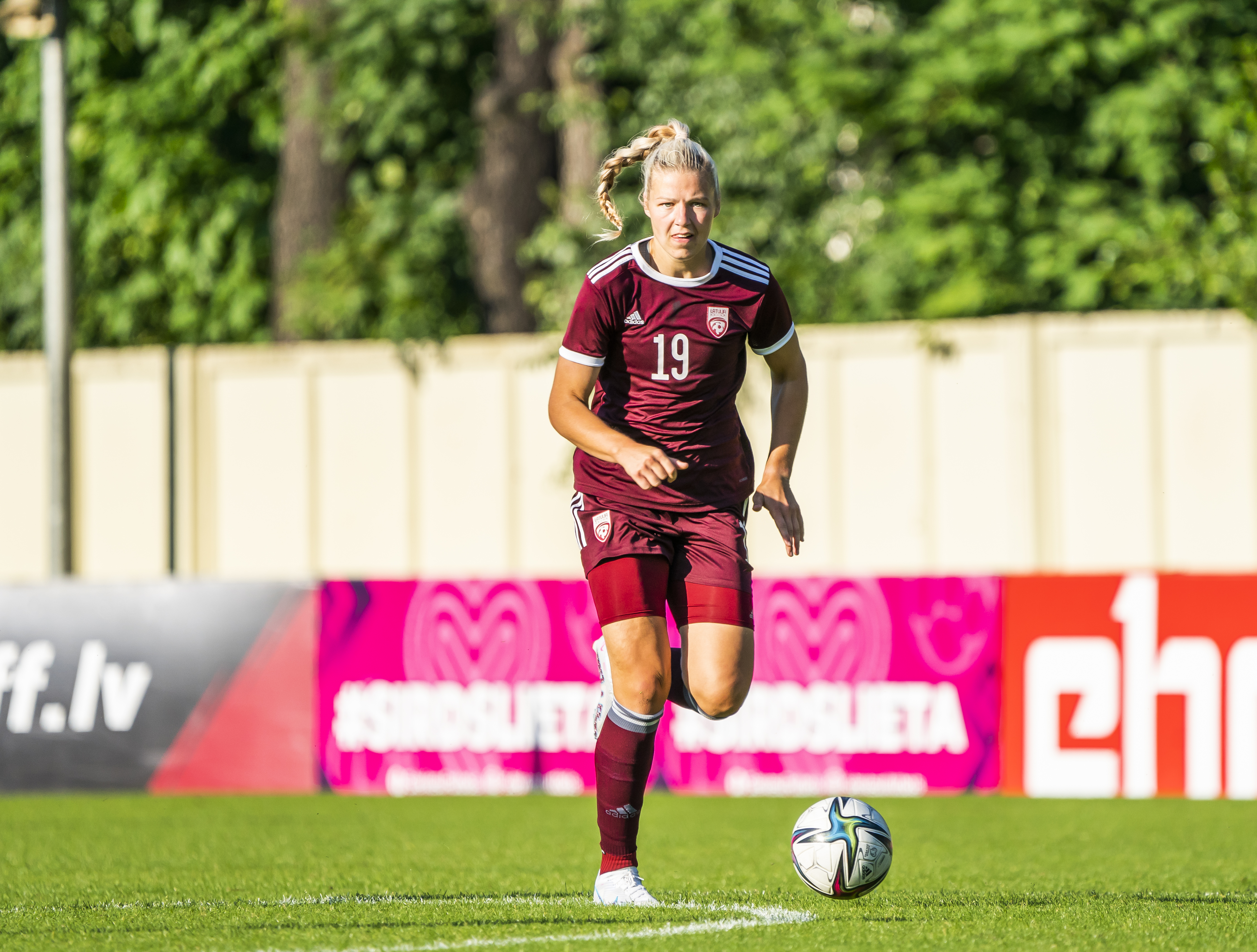
- Miksone playing for Latvia in 2023

Personal information
- Date of birth: 21 March 2000 (age 26)
- Place of birth: Nīca, Latvia
- Position: Midfielder

Team information
- Current team: Czarni Sosnowiec
- Number: 19

Youth career
- 2013–2020: FK Nīca
- 2013–2014: Liepāja
- 2014–2018: FK Dinamo Rīga

Senior career*
Years	Team	Apps	(Gls)
2015-2018	Rigas FS	36	(65)
2019	Dinamo Riga	15	(19)
2020	ÍBV	15	(5)
2021	Gintra	10	(7)
2021–2023	Medyk Konin	38	(14)
2023–	Czarni Sosnowiec	61	(29)

International career^{‡}
2014–2016	Latvia U17	21	(4)
2017–2018	Latvia U19	16	(10)
2015–	Latvia	83	(27)
- * Club domestic league appearances and goals as of 21:08, 2 June 2026 (UTC) ‡ National team caps and goals as of 14:50, 10 June 2026 (UTC)

Karlīna Miksone (born 21 March 2000) is a Latvian professional footballer who plays as a midfielder for Ekstraliga club Czarni Sosnowiec and the Latvia national team. During her career abroad, she has played in Iceland, Lithuania, and Poland. Miksone was named the 2024 Latvian Women's Footballer of the Year.

== Club career ==
In 2020 Miksone played in Iceland's Besta deild kvenna for ÍBV. In January 2021, she signed with Lithuanian FC Gintra. In the end of August 2021, she was one of two Latvians to leave the club alongside defender Anastasija Ročāne. She subsequently joined Polish Ekstraliga side Medyk Konin, scoring her first league goal for the club in a 4–1 September 2021 win against Rekord Bielsko-Biała.

In January 2025, Miksone was recognised as the 2024 Latvian Women's Footballer of the Year, winning the award for the first time.

== International career ==
Miksone was only 14 years and 322 days old when she made her debut for the Latvia national team on 6 February 2015. She replaced long-time team captain Olga Matīsa in the 66th minute of a friendly match, which resulted in a 0–2 loss to Estonia.

She continued to play for her national team at age groups, scoring twice for the Latvia under-19 team in the 2017 Baltic Cup.

Miksone appeared for the team during the 2019 FIFA Women's World Cup qualifying cycle. In September 2023 Miksone scored a hat trick in a 4–0 UEFA Nations League win, away against Andorra. She scored five goals in nine games for the national team in 2024, going past 20 international goals in the process.

== Career statistics ==
=== Club ===
As of match played 30 May 2026

Appearances and goals by club, season and competition
Club	Season	League			National cup (Note: Includes Polish Cup)		Europe		Total	
Club	Season	Division	Apps	Goals	Apps	Goals	Apps	Goals	Apps	Goals
Rigas FS	2015	Latvian League	5	2					5	2
Rigas FS	2016	Latvian League	7	10					7	10
Rigas FS	2017	Latvian League	12	21					12	21
Rigas FS	2018	Latvian League	12	32					12	32
Rigas FS	Total		36	65					36	65
Dinamo Riga	2019	Latvian League	15	19					15	19
ÍBV	2020	Besta deild kvenna	15	5					15	5
Gintra	2021	Moterų A Lyga	10	7			2 (Note: Appearances in UEFA Women's Champions League)	0	12	7
Medyk Konin	2021–22	Ekstraliga	17	5	5	2	—		22	7
Medyk Konin	2022–23	Ekstraliga	21	9	2	4	—		23	13
Medyk Konin	Total		38	14	7	6	—		45	20
Czarni Sosnowiec	2023–24	Ekstraliga	21	9	3	1	—		24	10
Czarni Sosnowiec	2024–25	Ekstraliga	20	10	6	3	—		26	13
Czarni Sosnowiec	2025–26	Ekstraliga	20	9	4	2	—		24	11
Czarni Sosnowiec	Total		61	28	13	6	—		74	34
Career total			175	138	20	12	2	0	197	150

=== International ===
Scores and results list Latvia's goal tally first, score column indicates score after each Miksone goal.

List of international goals scored by Karlina Miksone
No.	Date	Venue	Opponent	Score	Result	Competition
1	11 April 2017	Mikheil Meskhi Stadium, Tbilisi, Georgia	Georgia	1–1	1–1	2019 FIFA Women's World Cup qualification
2	6 August 2017	Savivaldybė Stadium, Šiauliai, Lithuania	Lithuania	1–1	1–1	Women's Baltic Cup 2017
3	1 September 2018	TNTK Stadium, Tallinn, Estonia	Lithuania	1–0	4–0	Women's Baltic Cup 2018
4	2 September 2018	TNTK Stadium, Tallinn, Estonia	Estonia	2–0	2–0	Women's Baltic Cup 2018
5	8 April 2019	FK Jelgava Sporta bāze, Jelgava, Latvia	Belarus	1–3	1–3	Friendly
6	14 June 2019	Jānis Skredelis' stadium, Riga, Latvia	Estonia	1–0	3–0	Women's Baltic Cup 2019
7	16 June 2019	Jānis Skredelis' stadium, Riga, Latvia	Lithuania	1–0	2–0	Women's Baltic Cup 2019
8	4 October 2019	Daugava Stadium, Liepāja, Latvia	Slovakia	1–0	1–2	UEFA Women's Euro 2022 qualifying
9	14 July 2023	Jānis Skredelis' stadium, Riga, Latvia	Azerbaijan	1–1	1–1	Friendly
10	17 July 2023	LNK Sporta Parks, Riga, Latvia	Azerbaijan	1–1	1–1	Friendly
11	26 September 2023	Estadi Nacional, Andorra la Vella, Andorra	Andorra	1–0	4–0	2023–24 UEFA Women's Nations League
12	26 September 2023	Estadi Nacional, Andorra la Vella, Andorra	Andorra	2–0	4–0	2023–24 UEFA Women's Nations League
13	26 September 2023	Estadi Nacional, Andorra la Vella, Andorra	Andorra	4–0	4–0	2023–24 UEFA Women's Nations League
14	31 October 2023	Stadionul Zimbru, Chișinău, Moldova	Moldova	1–1	3–3	2023–24 UEFA Women's Nations League
15	31 October 2023	Stadionul Zimbru, Chișinău, Moldova	Moldova	2–3	3–3	2023–24 UEFA Women's Nations League
16	5 December 2023	Centenary Stadium, Ta' Qali, Malta	Malta	1–0	1–2	2023–24 UEFA Women's Nations League
17	5 April 2024	LNK Sporta Parks, Riga, Latvia	North Macedonia	1–0	3–4	UEFA Women's Euro 2025 qualifying
18	5 April 2024	LNK Sporta Parks, Riga, Latvia	North Macedonia	3–4	3–4	UEFA Women's Euro 2025 qualifying
19	16 July 2024	Daugava Stadium, Riga, Latvia	Moldova	2–1	2–1	UEFA Women's Euro 2025 qualifying
20	24 October 2024	LNK Sporta Parks, Riga, Latvia	Faroe Islands	1–0	2–1	2024 Women's Baltic Cup
21	24 October 2024	LNK Sporta Parks, Riga, Latvia	Faroe Islands	2–1	2–1	2024 Women's Baltic Cup
22	4 April 2025	Petar Miloševski Training Centre, Skopje, North Macedonia	North Macedonia	1–0	2–1	2025 UEFA Women's Nations League C
23	4 April 2025	Petar Miloševski Training Centre, Skopje, North Macedonia	North Macedonia	2–1	2–1	2025 UEFA Women's Nations League C
24	3 June 2025	LNK Sporta Parks, Riga, Latvia	Kosovo	2–2	2–2	2025 UEFA Women's Nations League C
25	24 October 2025	Raudondvaris Stadium, Raudondvaris, Lithuania	Estonia	1–0	1–0	2025 Women's Baltic Cup
26	27 October 2025	Raudondvaris Stadium, Raudondvaris, Lithuania	Lithuania	1–0	3–0	2025 Women's Baltic Cup
27	9 June 2026	Daugava Stadium, Riga, Latvia	Slovakia	1–0	1–2	2027 FIFA Women's World Cup qualification

== Honours ==
Rīgas FS

- Latvian League: 2015, 2016, 2017, 2018

Dinamo Riga

- Latvian League: 2019

Czarni Sosnowiec

- Ekstraliga: 2025–26
- Polish Cup: 2024–25

Individual

- Latvian Footballer of the Year: 2024
