= Paweł Florek =

Polish footballer

Personal information
- Date of birth: 24 June 1996 (age 30)
- Place of birth: Tychy, Poland
- Height: 1.86 m (6 ft 1 in)
- Position: Goalkeeper

Team information
- Current team: Kuźnia Ustroń
- Number: 12

Youth career
- –2009: MOSM Tychy
- 2009–2011: Chrziciel Tychy
- 2011–2014: GKS Tychy

Senior career*
| Years | Team | Apps | (Gls) |
| 2014 | Nadwiślan Góra | 17 | (0) |
| 2015–2017 | GKS Tychy | 65 | (0) |
| 2018–2019 | Badajoz | 8 | (0) |
| 2019–2020 | Villanovense | 27 | (0) |
| 2020–2022 | Alzira | 50 | (0) |
| 2023 | Unia Kosztowy | 6 | (0) |
| 2023–2024 | Polonia Łaziska Górne | 15 | (0) |
| 2024–2025 | Rekord Bielsko-Biała | 9 | (0) |
| 2025 | → Kuźnia Ustroń (loan) | 17 | (0) |
| 2025– | Kuźnia Ustroń | 30 | (0) |
- * Club domestic league appearances and goals as of 09:39, 15 June 2026 (UTC)

Paweł Florek (born 24 June 1996) is a Polish professional footballer who plays as a goalkeeper for IV liga club Kuźnia Ustroń.

== Career ==
As a youth player, Florek trialed for the youth academies of Borussia Dortmund, one of Germany's most successful clubs, and Sevilla in the Spanish La Liga.

In 2014, he signed with Polish third division side Nadwiślan Góra.

In 2015, Florek joined GKS Tychy in the Polish second division, where he received interest from a Dutch team and made 65 league appearances and scored 0 goals.

Before the second half of the 2017–18 season, he moved to Badajoz in the Spanish third division.

In 2019, Florek signed with Spanish fourth division outfit Alzira.

He is a rapper.

== Honours ==
Rekord Bielsko-Biała

- III liga, group III: 2023–24
