= Maciej Kalkowski =

Polish footballer

Personal information
- Full name: Maciej Kalkowski
- Date of birth: 18 July 1974 (age 52)
- Place of birth: Gdańsk, Poland
- Height: 1.75 m (5 ft 9 in)
- Position: Midfielder

Team information
- Current team: AP Orlen Gdańsk (women) (manager)

Youth career
- Lechia Gdańsk

Senior career*
| Years | Team | Apps | (Gls) |
| 1993–1997 | Lechia Gdańsk | 83 | (7) |
| 1997–2000 | GKS Bełchatów | 90 | (1) |
| 2001–2002 | Arka Gdynia | 16 | (1) |
| 2002 | Chojniczanka Chojnice | | |
| 2002–2003 | Unia Tczew | 13 | (0) |
| 2003 | Stomil Olsztyn | 14 | (0) |
| 2003 | Arka Gdynia | 6 | (0) |
| 2004–2009 | Lechia Gdańsk | 95 | (18) |
| 2009–2010 | Lechia Gdańsk II | 23 | (1) |
| 2011–2015 | Portowiec Gdańsk | | |
| Total | | 340 | (28) |

Managerial career
- 2010–2011: Cartusia Kartuzy
- 2014: Lechia Gdańsk II
- 2020–2021: Elana Toruń
- 2022: Lechia Gdańsk (caretaker)
- 2023–2026: Tylko Lechia Gdańsk
- 2026–: AP Orlen Gdańsk (women)
- * Club domestic league appearances and goals

Maciej Kalkowski (born 18 July 1974) is a Polish football manager and former player who played as a midfielder. He is currently in charge of Ekstraliga club AP Orlen Gdańsk. He started and finished his professional playing career with Lechia Gdańsk. The majority of his playing career was spent at teams in the Pomeranian region, with the exception of GKS Bełchatów and Stomil Olsztyn.

== Career ==
Kalkowski started his career with his local team Lechia Gdańsk, making his debut for the team in May 1993. His first stint with Lechia was not successful, with the team experiencing two relegations and having to play with the Lechia second team during the failed Olimpia-Lechia Gdańsk merger. In 1997 with Lechia Gdańsk experiencing difficulties as a club he moved to GKS Bełchatów. In his first season with Bełchatów the team won promotion to the first division after winning the II liga. The team were relegated the season after, and Kalkowski left after the team failed to win promotion back to the I liga at the first attempt. After his move to Bełchatów, he returned to Pomerania and had short spells with Arka Gdynia, Chojniczanka Chojnice and Unia Tczew, before leaving the region again to play for Stomil Olsztyn for a season, before once more returning to play with Arka Gdynia. During his short stints Kalkowski accomplished little, and only leaving Stomil Olsztyn after they were demoted from the second tier to the fifth tier. In 2004 he returned to Lechia Gdańsk, who were when he joined, playing in the fourth tier. He joined Lechia during their rise up the leagues, winning the IV liga, III liga, and II liga, playing for Lechia in the Ekstraklasa in 2008. He played his final season for the Lechia first team during the 2008–09 season. And retired from professional football in 2010 after spending his final season with the Lechia II team helping them to win their division. He had a brief spell in management with Cartusia Kartuzy from 2010 to 2011. After his professional career he spent time playing with Portowiec Gdańsk from 2011 until 2014 while holding various coaching roles with Lechia Gdańsk since 2011.

== Honours ==
=== Player ===
GKS Bełchatów

- II liga: 1997–98

Lechia Gdańsk

- II liga: 2007–08
- III liga, group II: 2004–05
- IV liga Pomerania: 2003–04

Lechia Gdańsk II

- IV liga Pomerania: 2009–10

Portowiec Gdańsk

- Klasa A Gdańsk II: 2013–14

=== Managerial ===
Tylko Lechia Gdańsk

- Klasa B Gdańsk II: 2023–24
