= Stilon Gorzów Wielkopolski (women) =

Polish football club

TKKF Stilon Gorzów Wielkopolski
- Full name: Towarzystwo Krzewienia Kultury Fizycznej Stilon Gorzów Wielkopolski
- Founded: 1984; 41 years ago
- 2022–23: III liga, group III, 11th of 11 (withdrew mid-season)
Home colours	Away colours

TKKF Stilon Gorzów Wielkopolski is a Polish women's football club from Gorzów Wielkopolski.

TKKF Stilon was founded in 1984 and have found success throughout the 1990s, winning three championship titles and three Polish Cups. Stilon has spent the majority of the last two decades between the first and second division. After the top league was reformed into the current Ekstraliga format, they have played in the Ekstraklasa in three seasons: 2005–06, 2010–11 and 2014–15. They withdrew from senior competition in the middle of the 2022–23 season while competing in the fourth tier.

== Honours ==
- Ekstraliga
  - Champions: 1991–92, 1994–95, 1994–96
  - Runners-up: 1992–93, 1993–94, 1996–97
- Polish Cup
  - Winners: 1990–91, 1991–92, 1992–93
  - Runners-up: 1985–86, 1988–89, 1994–95, 1996–97, 1999–2000
