= Dariusz Pawłowski =

Polish footballer

Personal information
- Full name: Dariusz Pawłowski
- Date of birth: 25 February 1999 (age 27)
- Place of birth: Zabrze, Poland
- Height: 1.84 m (6 ft 1/2 in)
- Positions: Right-back; right midfielder

Team information
- Current team: Rekord Bielsko-Biała
- Number: 16

Youth career
- –2016: Górnik Zabrze

Senior career*
Years	Team	Apps	(Gls)
2016–2020	Górnik Zabrze II	53	(11)
2016–2022	Górnik Zabrze	35	(1)
2019	→ Termalica (loan)	6	(0)
2022–2025	Radomiak Radom	13	(0)
2023	→ Sandecja (loan)	16	(0)
2023–2024	→ Polonia Warsaw (loan)	19	(0)
2025	→ Tatran Prešov (loan)	12	(1)
2025–	Rekord Bielsko-Biała	32	(0)

International career
2017	Poland U19	2	(0)
- * Club domestic league appearances and goals as of 11:12, 31 May 2026 (UTC)

Dariusz Pawłowski (born 25 February 1999) is a Polish professional footballer who plays as a right-back for II liga club Rekord Bielsko-Biała.

== Honours ==
Górnik Zabrze II

- Polish Cup (Zabrze regionals): 2015–16

Tatran Prešov

- 2. Liga: 2024–25
