= Dominika Kopińska =

Polish footballer

Personal information
- Date of birth: 11 October 1999 (age 27)
- Place of birth: Nowe, Poland
- Position: Midfielder

Team information
- Current team: Górnik Łęczna

Youth career
- –2013: Wisła Nowe
- 2013–2014: Unifreeze Górzno

Senior career*
Years	Team	Apps	(Gls)
2014–2015	Unifreeze Górzno		
2015–2017	Sztorm Gdańsk		
2017–2018	Unifreeze Górzno	21	(11)
2018–2021	Medyk Konin	51	(37)
2021–2023	UKS SMS Łódź	42	(40)
2023–2025	FC Fleury 91	21	(2)
2025–2026	Dijon	6	(1)
2026–	Górnik Łęczna	0	(0)

International career
2018–2022	Poland	6	(1)
- * Club domestic league appearances and goals as of 12:59, 30 May 2026 (UTC)

Dominika Kopińska (born 11 October 1999) is a Polish professional footballer who plays as a midfielder for Ekstraliga club Górnik Łęczna.

== Career ==
Kopińska has been capped for the Poland national team, appearing for the team during the 2019 FIFA Women's World Cup qualifying cycle.

== Career statistics ==
=== International ===
Appearances and goals by national team and year
National team	Year	Apps	Goals
Poland	2018	1	0
Poland	2020	1	1
Poland	2022	4	0
Total		6	1

Scores and results list Poland's goal tally first, score column indicates score after each Kopińska goal.

List of international goals scored by Dominika Kopińska
No.	Date	Venue	Opponent	Score	Result	Competition
1	27 October 2020	Zimbru Stadium, Chișinău, Moldova	Moldova	3–0	3–0	UEFA Euro 2022 qualifying

== Honours ==
SMS Łódź

- Ekstraliga: 2021–22
- Polish Cup: 2022–23

Individual

- Ekstraliga top scorer: 2021–22, 2022–23
