= Legia Warsaw (women) =

- Nickname: Legia Ladies
- Founded: 2020; 6 years ago
- Ground: Legia Training Center
- Manager: Maciej Anglart
- League: Ekstraliga
- 2025–26: I liga, 1st of 12 (promoted)
- Website: legia.com

Legia Warsaw (women) (Polish: Legia Warszawa), commonly known as Legia Ladies, is a Polish women's football team based in Warsaw. It is the women's football section associated with Legia Warsaw. The team competes in the Ekstraliga, the highest level of women's football in Poland.

The senior women's team was established in 2020 after the Legia Ladies program, which had been developed through Legia Soccer Schools, entered official senior competition. Legia began in the IV liga at regional level, subsequently reached the III liga, and entered the I liga in 2024. The team won the I liga championship in the 2025–26 season and gained promotion to the Ekstraliga for the first time.

== History ==
=== Early development ===
Legia had operated women's football through Legia Soccer Schools before establishing a senior team in the national league system. The Legia Ladies program had been developed from 2016, with girls participating in the club's schools and youth structures. The senior team entered official women's league competition for the first time in the 2020–21 season.

Legia entered the IV liga in the Masovian regional competition in 2020. In their first season, the team finished second and missed promotion to the III liga after finishing behind Jantar Ostrołęka.

The team remained in the IV liga for the 2021–22 season and again challenged for promotion. Legia finished second in the competition.

=== III liga ===
Legia subsequently progressed to the III liga. The club's official account states that Legia Ladies advanced from the IV liga to the III liga and won the Masovian Polish Cup twice during this period.

The 2022–23 season was Legia's first in the III liga. The team finished third in its group with 46 points from 22 matches, scoring 96 goals and conceding 30.

=== Entry into the I liga ===
In 2024, Legia Ladies entered the I liga. The move followed the creation of Legionistki sp. z o.o., a company established to manage the team's sporting and business operations. The team entered the I liga in place of SWD Wodzisław Śląski after receiving the necessary approval from the Polish Football Association (PZPN).

Maciej Anglart was appointed head coach. The squad combined players from the existing Legia Ladies team with players from Wodzisław and new recruits. The youth development program remained within Legia Soccer Schools.

Legia completed the spring portion of the 2023–24 season in the I liga and remained in the division.

On 26 May 2024, Legia Ladies played Bielawianka Bielawa at the Stadion Wojska Polskiego and won 4–2. It was the first time the women's team played a match on the main pitch of Legia's stadium.

=== 2024–25 ===
Legia continued to establish itself in the I liga during the 2024–25 season and finished third.

=== 2025–26 ===
Legia began the 2025–26 I liga season with promotion to the Ekstraliga as its objective. Maciej Anglart remained head coach, with Adrian Piankowski serving as assistant coach.

Legia won the I liga championship with 58 points from 22 matches. The team recorded 19 wins, one draw and two defeats, scoring 86 goals and conceding 20.

Legia secured promotion to the Ekstraliga before the final matchday. The team finished the season with a 2–1 victory over Medyk Konin.

The promotion was the first in Legia women's senior history to the highest level of Polish women's football.

=== Ekstraliga ===
Legia made its Ekstraliga debut in the 2026–27 season. The team's opening fixture was against Pogoń Szczecin.

== Stadium and facilities ==
Legia Ladies are based at the Legia Training Center, where the team has played home matches.

The team has also played selected matches at the Stadion Wojska Polskiego, Legia Warsaw's principal stadium. On 26 May 2024, Legia Ladies played Bielawianka Bielawa at the stadium and won 4–2.

== Organization ==
Legia Warsaw and Legia Soccer Schools have developed women's football at youth, junior and senior levels. When the senior team entered the I liga in 2024, sporting and business operations were placed under Legionistki sp. z o.o., while the development of younger girls remained within Legia Soccer Schools.

Legia Soccer Schools operates women's teams across several age groups and describes its women's programme as a pathway from youth football to the senior Legia Ladies team.

== Club identity ==
The team operates under the Legia Warsaw identity and is commonly referred to as Legia Ladies. Players are also referred to as Legionistki in Polish-language coverage.

The club has developed a distinct commercial profile for its women's team. In 2025, Legia and Adidas introduced a shirt specifically for Legia Ladies.

== Sponsorship and media ==
Klarna became the main sponsor of Legia Ladies during the 2023–24 season.

In 2024, Legia Ladies entered a media partnership with TikTok.

== Coaching staff ==
Maciej Anglart has served as head coach since the team's entry into the I liga structure in 2024.

The coaching staff listed for the 2025–26 season was:

- Maciej Anglart – head coach
- Adrian Piankowski – assistant coach
- Denis Makarov – goalkeeper coach
- Bartłomiej Kursa – fitness coach
- Jacek Grześkowiak – analyst and team manager
- Dominika Daros – physiotherapist
- Bartłomiej Krasowski – physiotherapist

== Honours ==
=== Domestic ===
- I liga
  - Champions: 2025–26
- Polish Cup (Masovia regionals)
  - Winners: Twice

== Seasons ==
Season	Competition	Position	Notes
2020–21	IV liga	2nd	—
2021–22	IV liga	2nd	—
2022–23	III liga	3rd	—
2023–24	I liga	—	Joined the competition during the spring round
2024–25	I liga	3rd	—
2025–26	I liga	1st	Champions; promoted
2026–27	Ekstraliga	—	First season in the top division

== Records ==
=== Highest league finish ===
- Ekstraliga: first appearance, 2026–27
- I liga: 1st, 2025–26
- III liga: 3rd, 2022–23
- IV liga: 2nd, 2020–21 and 2021–22

=== Best I liga season ===
Legia's 2025–26 season was its most successful senior campaign. The team won 19 of 22 matches and finished with 58 points, seven points ahead of second-placed Ślęza Wrocław.

== See also ==
- Legia Warsaw
- Legia Warsaw (sports club)
- Ekstraliga
- Women's football in Poland
