= 2025–26 Ekstraliga (women's football) =

Polish women's football league season

Ekstraliga
- Season: 2025–26
- Dates: 9 August 2025 – 30 May 2026
- Champions: Czarni Sosnowiec
- Relegated: Stomilanki Olsztyn; Pogoń Dekpol Tczew
- Champions League: Czarni Sosnowiec
- Matches: 132
- Goals: 448 (3.39 per match)
- Top goalscorer: Klaudia Miłek (21 goals)
- Biggest home win: Czarni 7–0 Pogoń T. (27 September 2025)
- Biggest away win: Pogoń T. 0–8 Czarni (25 April 2026)
- Highest scoring: Pogoń Sz. 7–2 Stomilanki (21 March 2026)
- Longest winning run: 9 matches Pogoń Szczecin
- Longest unbeaten run: 11 matches Czarni Sosnowiec
- Longest winless run: 20 matches Pogoń Tczew
- Longest losing run: 7 matches Pogoń Tczew

The 2025–26 season of the Ekstraliga, also known as Orlen Ekstraliga for sponsorship reasons, was the 51th season of the top-tier women's football league in Poland.

GKS Katowice were the defending champions, having won their second title in the 2024–25 season.

Czarni Sosnowiec were confirmed champions for the 14th time in the club's history after a 2–1 win over Śląsk Wrocław on 23 May 2026.

The schedule for the first half of the 2025–26 season has been announced on 1 July 2025. 11 matchdays were played in 2025, with the first matchday scheduled for 9 and 10 August 2025.

== Teams ==
Locations of teams in the 2025–26 Ekstraliga.

Team	Home city	Home ground	Capacity	2024–25 finish
AP Orlen Gdańsk	Gdańsk	Gdańsk Athletics and Rugby Stadium	924	7th
AZS UJ Kraków	Kraków	Władysław Kawula Municipal Stadium	1,224	1st in I liga
Czarni Antrans Sosnowiec	Sosnowiec	Jan Ciszewski Stadium	1,000	2nd
Energa Stomilanki Olsztyn	Olsztyn	OSiR Stadium	4,500	10th
GKS Katowice	Katowice	GKS Katowice Stadium	6,710	1st
Górnik Łęczna	Łęczna	Łęczna Stadium	7,226	4th
Grot SMS Łódź	Łódź	SMS Stadium	2,000	6th
Lech Poznań UAM	Poznań	GOSiR Stadium in Plewiska	600	2nd in I liga
Pogoń Szczecin	Szczecin	Nehring Stadium	1,500	3rd
Pogoń Dekpol Tczew	Tczew	Bałdowska Street Stadium		9th
Rekord Bielsko-Biała	Bielsko-Biała	Rekord Sports Centre	600	8th
Śląsk Wrocław	Wrocław	GEM Hotel and Recreation Complex	400	5th

=== Team changes ===
Promoted from 2024–25 I liga	Relegated from 2024–25 Ekstraliga
▲AZS UJ Kraków (1st) ▲ Lech Poznań UAM (2nd)	▼ Resovia (11th) ▼ Skra Częstochowa (12th)

== League table ==
Pos	Team	Pld	W	D	L	GF	GA	GD	Pts	Qualification
1	Czarni Antrans Sosnowiec (C, Q)	22	18	2	2	68	18	+50	56	Qualification for the Champions League first qualifying round
2	Pogoń Szczecin	22	16	3	3	60	18	+42	51	
3	GKS Katowice	22	15	3	4	51	26	+25	48	
4	Górnik Łęczna	22	15	2	5	49	20	+29	47	
5	Grot SMS Łódź	22	8	5	9	35	35	0	29	
6	Rekord Bielsko-Biała	22	8	4	10	29	34	−5	28	
7	Śląsk Wrocław	22	8	2	12	39	33	+6	26	
8	Lech Poznań UAM	22	7	5	10	29	46	−17	26	
9	AZS UJ Kraków	22	6	6	10	26	37	−11	24	
10	AP Orlen Gdańsk	22	7	2	13	24	45	−21	23	
11	Energa Stomilanki Olsztyn (R)	22	3	2	17	23	70	−47	11	Relegation to I liga
12	Pogoń Dekpol Tczew (R)	22	1	4	17	15	66	−51	7	Relegation to I liga

Updated to match(es) played on 30 May 2026. Source: 90minut.pl
Rules for classification: 1) Points; 2) Head-to-head points; 3) Head-to-head goal difference; 4) Goal difference; 5) Goals scored; 6) Number of wins; 7) Number of away wins. 8) Lower amount of yellow cards received. 9) Draw.
(Note: Head-to-head record is used only after all the matches between the teams in question have been played)
(C) Champions; (Q) Qualified for the phase indicated; (R) Relegated

== Results ==
Home \ Away	AZS	CZA	GÓR	KAT	LPO	ORL	PSZ	PTC	REK
AZS UJ Kraków									
Czarni Antrans Sosnowiec						6–0	0–1	5–0	
Górnik Łęczna		1–2						6–0	
GKS Katowice		2–1	2–0						6–0
Lech Poznań UAM									
AP Orlen Gdańsk			0–2	0–2			2–3		2–1
Pogoń Szczecin			5–2	1–3					4–1
Pogoń Dekpol Tczew				0–3		2–1	0–3		3–1
Rekord Bielsko-Biała		0–6	0–0						

Updated to match(es) played on 30 November 2024. Source: 90minut.pl
Legend: Blue = home team win; Yellow = draw; Red = away team win.

== Season statistics ==
=== Top goalscorers ===
Rank	Player	Club	Goals
1	(Poland) Klaudia Miłek	Czarni Sosnowiec	21
2	(Poland) Patrycja Sarapata	Czarni Sosnowiec	15
3	(Poland) Paulina Filipczak	UKS SMS Łódź	12
4	(Poland) Julia Piętakiewicz	Górnik Łęczna	10
4	(Poland) Anna Rędzia	Górnik Łęczna	10
7	(Slovakia) Klaudia Fabová	AP Orlen Gdańsk	9
7	(Poland) Wiktoria Kaczmarek	AZS UJ Kraków	9
7	(Poland) Lena Świrska	Pogoń Szczecin	9
10	(Poland) Dominika Dereń	Rekord Bielsko-Biała	8
10	(Poland) Karolina Gec	Śląsk Wrocław	8
10	(Latvia) Karlīna Miksone	Czarni Sosnowiec	8
10	(Poland) Aleksandra Nieciąg	GKS Katowice	8
10	(Latvia) Anastasija Poļuhoviča	Pogoń Szczecin	8

== Awards ==
Award	Player	Club
Player of the Season	(Poland) Paulina Tomasiak	Górnik Łęczna
Goalkeeper of the Season	(Poland) Oliwia Szperkowska	Czarni Sosnowiec
Defender of the Season	(Poland) Katarzyna Nowak	GKS Katowice
Midfielder of the Season	(Poland) Patrycja Sarapata	Czarni Sosnowiec
Forward of the Season	(Poland) Klaudia Miłek	Czarni Sosnowiec
Young Player of the Season	(Poland) Lena Świrska	Pogoń Szczecin
Coach of the Season	(Poland) Sebastian Stemplewski	Czarni Sosnowiec
Goal of the Season	(Poland) Paulina Tomasiak	Górnik Łęczna
