= Klaudia Fabová =

Slovak footballer

Personal information
- Date of birth: 12 September 1998 (age 28)
- Position: Striker

Team information
- Current team: AP Orlen Gdańsk
- Number: 9

Senior career*
Years	Team	Apps	(Gls)
- Slovácko
2018–2020	PWSZ Wałbrzych	37	(17)
2020–2022	Medyk Konin	27	(8)
2022–2024	Górnik Łęczna	36	(18)
2024–	AP Orlen Gdańsk	43	(17)

International career^{‡}
2015–	Slovakia	68	(12)
- * Club domestic league appearances and goals as of 20:56, 2 June 2026 (UTC) ‡ National team caps and goals as of 20:56, 2 June 2026 (UTC)

Klaudia Fabová (born 12 September 1998) is a Slovak professional footballer who plays as a striker for Ekstraliga club AP Orlen Gdańsk and the Slovakia national team.

== Career ==
Fabová has been capped for the Slovakia national team, appearing for the team during the 2019 FIFA Women's World Cup qualifying cycle.

== Career statistics ==
=== International ===
Scores and results list Slovakia's goal tally first, score column indicates score after each Fabová goal.

List of international goals scored by Klaudia Fabová
No.	Date	Venue	Opponent	Score	Result	Competition
1	7 August 2015	Senec, Slovakia	United Arab Emirates		6–0	Friendly
2	26 November 2016	Lučko, Croatia	Croatia		5–3	Friendly
3	12 June 2017	Ružomberok, Slovakia	Greece		1–1	Friendly
4	19 September 2017	Sarpsborg Stadion, Sarpsborg, Norway	Norway	1–6	1–6	2019 FIFA World Cup qualification
5	14 June 2019	Poprad, Slovakia	Poland	1–0	1–0	Friendly
6	17 June 2019	Südstadt, Austria	Austria	1–1	1–1	Friendly
7	1 December 2024	NTC Stadion, Senec, Slovakia	Greece	1–1	1–2	Friendly
8	21 February 2025	Anton Malatinský Stadium, Trnava, Slovakia	Faroe Islands	3–0	3–0	2025 UEFA Nations League
9	4 April 2025	Europa Sports Park, Europa Point, Gibraltar	Gibraltar	2–0	8–0	2025 UEFA Nations League
10	4 April 2025	Europa Sports Park, Europa Point, Gibraltar	Gibraltar	4–0	8–0	2025 UEFA Nations League
11	14 April 2026	Helsinki Football Stadium, Helsinki, Finland	Finland	1–2	2–4	2027 FIFA World Cup qualification
12	18 April 2026	Futbal Tatran Arena, Prešov, Slovakia	Portugal	1–0	1–2	2027 FIFA World Cup qualification
