= Pogoń Tczew =

Association football club in Tczew, Poland

KS Pogoń Tczew
- Full name: Klub Sportowy Pogoń Tczew
- Short name: Pogoń Tczew
- Founded: 2016; 10 years ago
- Ground: Bałdowska Street Stadium
- Coach: vacant
- League: III liga
- 2025–26: Ekstraliga, 12th of 12 (relegated)
- Website: pogontczew.pl
Home colours	Away colours

Pogoń Tczew, also known as Pogoń Dekpol Tczew, is a women's football club from the Kociewian town of Tczew, Poland. As of the 2026–27 season, they play in the III liga, the fourth tier, following relegation from the Ekstraliga the previous season and choosing not to compete in the I liga.

== History ==
Pogoń Tczew was founded in 2016 when the women's section of Gryf Tczew broke away to form a separate club. Their first game as an independent club was played against AZS-AWFiS Gdańsk.

The 2021–22 season saw Pogoń Tczew promoted from the I liga into the Ekstraliga for the first time in their history. By the winter break of the 2022–23 season, Pogoń Tczew's debut in the Ekstraliga, the team were in the relegation zone, however they went on to finish the season in ninth position in the table. The following season, they finished one place higher, sealing Medyk Konin's relegation in their final match.

At the start of the 2024–25 season, the club was fined zł1,000 by the PZPN for procedural irregularities in their licensing application. In September 2024, it was reported that Pogoń Tczew striker Magdalena Sobal, who had recently made her debut for the national team, had signed a three-year deal with Juventus, initially going out on loan to Brescia.

== Ground ==
Pogoń Tczew play at the Bałdowska Street Stadium (Stadion przy ul. Bałdowskiej) also known as Stadion Miejski in Tczew.

Before 2025, they hosted games at the Jan Stachowiak Stadium (Stadion im. Jana Stachowiaka), which has a capacity of 1,292. They shared the ground with other local teams including the men's sides Gryf Tczew and Unia Tczew.

== Rivalries ==
Pogoń Tczew contest the 'Pomeranian derby' against Orlen Gdańsk, and the so-called 'Pogoń derby' against Pogoń Szczecin.

== Current squad ==
As of 9 September 2024

Note: Flags indicate national team as defined under FIFA eligibility rules; some limited exceptions apply. Players may hold more than one non-FIFA nationality.

No.	Pos.	Nation	Player
1	GK	POL	Adriana Banaszkiewicz
2	DF	POL	Maria Drzewiecka
4	DF	POL	Julia Zielińska
5	DF	POL	Małgorzata Korda
6	DF	POL	Joanna Jeleń
10	DF	POL	Weronika Andrzejewska
12	GK	POL	Amelia Jarguz
18	DF	POL	Agnieszka Rembalska
20	FW	POL	Aleksandra Witczak
26	FW	POL	Maria Golec

No.	Pos.	Nation	Player
28	DF	POL	Monika Wziątek
33	DF	POL	Emilia Sobierajska
66	DF	POL	Aleksandra Pąk
71	GK	POL	Beata Rydlewska
80	MF	POL	Martyna Tryka
87	MF	POL	Klaudia Tobiczyk
88	DF	JPN	Yurina Enjo
89	MF	POL	Barbara Wierzbińska
99	FW	POL	Wiktoria Rybicka

== See also ==
- Unia Tczew
- Wisła Tczew
