= 2024–25 Ekstraliga (women's football) =

Polish women's football league season

Ekstraliga
- Season: 2024–25
- Dates: 10 August 2024 – 25 May 2025
- Champions: GKS Katowice (2nd title)
- Relegated: Skra Częstochowa; Resovia
- Champions League: GKS Katowice
- Matches: 132
- Goals: 471 (3.57 per match)
- Top goalscorer: Julia Piętakiewicz (17 goals)
- Biggest home win: Czarni 12–0 Stomil Olsztyn (24 August 2024)
- Biggest away win: Rekord 0–6 Czarni (18 August 2024); Skra 0–6 Górnik (3 November 2024); Resovia 0–6 Czarni (22 March 2025); Resovia 0–6 Górnik (1 May 2025)
- Highest scoring: Czarni 12–0 Stomilanki (24 August 2024)
- Longest winning run: 18 matches GKS Katowice
- Longest unbeaten run: 18 matches GKS Katowice
- Longest winless run: 18 matches Skra
- Longest losing run: 18 matches Skra

The 2024–25 Ekstraliga, also known as Orlen Ekstraliga for sponsorship reasons, was the 46th season of the top-tier women's football league in Poland.

Pogoń Szczecin were the defending champions, having won their first title in the previous season.

After GKS Katowice's 7–2 victory over Energa Pogoń Tczew on 3 May 2025, GKS were confirmed champions for the second time in the club's history, having previously won it two years prior.

The schedule for the first half of the 2024–25 season was announced on 17 July 2024. 11 matchdays were played in 2024, with the first matchday scheduled for 11 August 2024. Some first matchday bouts ended up being rescheduled to 10 August 2024.

== Teams ==
Locations of teams in the 2024–25 Ekstraliga.

Team	Home city	Home ground	Capacity	2023–24 finish
Czarni Antrans Sosnowiec	Sosnowiec	Jan Ciszewski Stadium	1,000	3rd
Energa Pogoń Tczew	Tczew	Stadion Miejski przy ul. Elżbiety	1,292	8th
GKS Katowice	Katowice	GKS Katowice Stadium	6,710	2nd
Górnik Łęczna	Łęczna	Łęczna Stadium	7,226	6th
Grot SMS Łódź	Łódź	SMS Stadium	2,000	4th
AP Orlen Gdańsk	Gdańsk	Gdańsk Athletics and Rugby Stadium	924	5th
Pogoń Szczecin	Szczecin	Nehring Stadium	1,500	1st
Rekord Bielsko-Biała	Bielsko-Biała	Rekord Sports Centre	600	9th
Resovia	Rzeszów	Resovia Stadium	3,420	1st (in I liga)
Skra Częstochowa	Częstochowa	Municipal Stadium	990	2nd (in I liga)
Stomil Olsztyn	Olsztyn	OSiR Stadium	4,500	10th
Śląsk Wrocław	Wrocław	GEM Hotel and Recreation Complex	400	7th

=== Team changes ===
Promoted from 2023–24 I liga	Relegated from 2023–24 Ekstraliga
▲ Resovia (1st) ▲ Skra Częstochowa (2nd)	▼KS UJ Kraków (11th) ▼ Medyk Konin (12th)

== League table ==
Pos	Team	Pld	W	D	L	GF	GA	GD	Pts	Qualification
1	GKS Katowice (C)	22	21	0	1	74	8	+66	63	Qualification for the Champions League first qualifying round
2	Czarni Antrans Sosnowiec	22	17	1	4	83	17	+66	52	
3	Pogoń Szczecin	22	17	0	5	60	20	+40	51	
4	Górnik Łęczna	22	15	2	5	54	19	+35	47	
5	Śląsk Wrocław	22	12	2	8	48	36	+12	38	
6	SMS Łódź	22	9	6	7	31	17	+14	33	
7	AP Orlen Gdańsk	22	8	4	10	30	34	−4	28	
8	Rekord Bielsko-Biała	22	7	3	12	21	40	−19	24	
9	Pogoń Dekpol Tczew	22	5	3	14	24	58	−34	18	
10	Stomilanki Olsztyn	22	4	4	14	25	68	−43	16	
11	Resovia (R)	22	1	5	16	16	79	−63	8	Relegation to I liga
12	Skra Częstochowa (Note: Skra Częstochowa withdrew from the competition after matchday 14.) (R)	22	1	0	21	5	75	−70	3	Relegation to I liga

Updated to match(es) played on 25 May 2025. Source: 90minut.pl
Rules for classification: 1) Points; 2) Head-to-head points; 3) Head-to-head goal difference; 4) Goal difference; 5) Goals scored; 6) Number of wins; 7) Number of away wins. 8) Lower amount of yellow cards received. 9) Draw.
(Note: Head-to-head record is used only after all the matches between the teams in question have been played)
(C) Champions; (R) Relegated

== Results ==
Home \ Away	CZA	GÓR	KAT	ORL	PSZ	PTC	REK	RES	SKR	SMS	STO	ŚLĄ
Czarni Antrans Sosnowiec		1–2	0–5	6–0	0–1	5–0	2–0	10–0	3–0	2–0	12–0	6–3
Górnik Łęczna	1–2		2–0	2–0	1–0	6–0	0–1	1–1	3–0	1–0	4–0	1–2
GKS Katowice	2–1	2–0		4–0	2–1	7–2	6–0	7–0	3–0	1–0	5–0	3–0
AP Orlen Gdańsk	0–0	0–2	0–2		2–3	1–1	2–1	2–0	3–0	1–1	3–1	2–0
Pogoń Szczecin	1–2	5–2	1–3	1–0		2–0	4–1	8–1	9–0	0–1	1–0	6–3
Pogoń Dekpol Tczew	0–5	2–4	0–3	2–1	0–3		3–1	3–3	2–0	0–3	1–2	2–3
Rekord Bielsko-Biała	0–6	0–0	0–2	2–1	0–4	0–2		1–0	3–0	0–3	3–0	1–3
Resovia	0–6	0–6	0–4	1–4	0–2	1–1	0–4		1–2	1–4	2–2	2–3
Skra Częstochowa	0–4	0–6	1–6	0–3	0–3	0–3	0–2	0–3		0–2	0–3	0–4
SMS Łódź	0–1	0–1	0–1	1–1	0–1	3–0	0–0	3–0	3–0		2–2	1–1
Stomil Olsztyn	2–7	1–5	0–3	1–4	1–2	2–0	1–1	0–0	3–2	3–4		1–2
Śląsk Wrocław	0–2	2–4	0–3	3–0	1–2	3–0	1–0	6–0	3–0	0–0	5–0	

Source: 90minut.pl
Legend: Blue = home team win; Yellow = draw; Red = away team win.

== Season statistics ==
=== Top goalscorers ===
Rank	Player	Club	Goals
1	(Poland) Julia Piętakiewicz	Górnik Łęczna	17
3	(Poland) Klaudia Miłek	Czarni Sosnowiec	15
3	(Poland) Kornelia Okoniewska	Pogoń Szczecin	15
4	(Poland) Marcelina Buś	Śląsk Wrocław	12
5	(Poland) Kinga Kozak	GKS Katowice	10
5	(Poland) Klaudia Maciążka	GKS Katowice	10
5	(Latvia) Karlīna Miksone	Czarni Sosnowiec	10
8	(Poland) Patrycja Sarapata	Czarni Sosnowiec	9
10	(Slovakia) Klaudia Fabová	AP Orlen Gdańsk	8
10	(Poland) Zuzanna Grzywińska	Czarni Sosnowiec	8
10	(Poland) Anita Turkiewicz	GKS Katowice	8
10	(Poland) Marcjanna Zawadzka	Górnik Łęczna	8
