= Poland women's national under-19 football team =

Poland Women's U-19
- Association: Polish Football Association
- Confederation: UEFA (Europe)
- Head coach: Marcin Kasprowicz
- FIFA code: POL
First colours	Second colours

First international
- Poland 2–3 Belgium, (2 October 2002)

Biggest win
- Lithuania 0–9 Poland, (22 October 2012); Poland 9–0 Albania, (21 September 2013)

Biggest defeat
- England 7–0 Poland, (24 April 2008); Germany 7–0 Poland, (27 March 2010)

UEFA Women's Under-19 Championship
- Appearances: 3 (first in 2007)
- Best result: Group stage (2007, 2025), 2026)

The Polish women's national under-19 football team is the football team representing Poland in competitions for under-19 year old players and is controlled by the Polish Football Association.

== History ==
=== UEFA Women's Under-19 Championship ===
The Poland team has qualified for the UEFA Women's Under-19 Championship three times, in 2007, 2025 (as hosts) and 2026.

Year	Round	Pld	W	D	L	GF	GA
Two-legged final 1998	Did not qualify						
(Sweden) 1999	Did not qualify						
(France) 2000	Did not qualify						
(Norway) 2001	Did not qualify						
(Sweden) 2002	Did not qualify						
(Germany) 2003	Did not qualify						
(Finland) 2004	Did not qualify						
(Hungary) 2005	Did not qualify						
(Switzerland) 2006	Did not qualify						
(Iceland) 2007	Group stage	3	0	1	2	1	7
(France) 2008	Did not qualify						
(Belarus) 2009	Did not qualify						
(North Macedonia) 2010	Did not qualify						
(Italy) 2011	Did not qualify						
(Turkey) 2012	Did not qualify						
(Wales) 2013	Did not qualify						
(Norway) 2014	Did not qualify						
(Israel) 2015	Did not qualify						
(Slovakia) 2016	Did not qualify						
(Northern Ireland) 2017	Did not qualify						
(Switzerland) 2018	Did not qualify						
(Scotland) 2019	Did not qualify						
(Georgia (country)) ~~2020~~	Cancelled due to the COVID-19 pandemic						
(Belarus) ~~2021~~	Cancelled due to the COVID-19 pandemic						
(Czech Republic) 2022	Did not qualify						
(Belgium) 2023	Did not qualify						
(Lithuania) 2024	Did not qualify						
(Poland) 2025	Group stage	3	1	1	1	6	7
(Bosnia and Herzegovina) 2026	Group stage	3	1	1	1	6	3
(Hungary) 2027	To be determined						
Total	3/26	9	2	3	4	14	17

== Players ==
=== Current squad ===
The following players were called up for the 2026 UEFA Women's Under-19 Championship.

Caps and goals updated as of 3 July 2026, after the match against Bosnia and Herzegovina.

No.	Pos.	Player	Date of birth (age)	Caps	Goals	Club
1	GK	Julia Woźniak	15 April 2007 (age 19)	20	0	(Portuguese Football Federation) Sporting CP
12	GK	Hanna Wieczerzak	29 May 2007 (age 19)	4	0	(Royal Spanish Football Federation) Real Madrid
	GK	Zuzanna Błaszczyk	17 July 2008 (age 18)	5	0	(Polish Football Association) Śląsk Wrocław
2	DF	Oliwia Łapińska	9 February 2007 (age 19)	15	1	(Polish Football Association) Czarni Sosnowiec
4	DF	Magda Piekarska	9 September 2007 (age 19)	26	3	(Italian Football Federation) Roma
6	DF	Iga Witkowska	27 March 2007 (age 19)	15	0	(Polish Football Association) Czarni Sosnowiec
13	DF	Zofia Pągowska	25 April 2007 (age 19)	20	0	(Polish Football Association) UKS SMS Łódź
18	DF	Martyna Bartczak	25 June 2007 (age 19)	19	1	(Polish Football Association) UKS SMS Łódź
20	DF	Anna Potrykus	26 May 2007 (age 19)	10	0	(Polish Football Association) UKS SMS Łódź
3	MF	Julia Przybył	12 July 2007 (age 19)	21	2	(Polish Football Association) Lech Poznań UAM
5	MF	Emilia Sobierajska	22 August 2007 (age 19)	22	1	(Polish Football Association) Czarni Sosnowiec
7	MF	Krystyna Flis	4 January 2007 (age 19)	25	3	(Swiss Football Association) Basel
8	MF	Zuzanna Witek	19 September 2007 (age 19)	20	7	(Polish Football Association) Czarni Sosnowiec
9	MF	Małgorzata Rogus	15 April 2008 (age 18)	5	1	(Polish Football Association) Lech Poznań UAM
10	MF	Maja Zielińska	11 August 2007 (age 19)	21	2	(German Football Association) VfL Wolfsburg
11	MF	Oliwia Zgoda	8 November 2007 (age 19)	12	2	(Polish Football Association) Czarni Sosnowiec
15	MF	Weronika Araśniewicz	15 March 2008 (age 18)	15	8	(German Football Association) VfL Wolfsburg
16	MF	Kinga Klimczak	7 March 2008 (age 18)	10	0	(Polish Football Association) AP Orlen Gdańsk
17	MF	Lena Świrska	19 May 2009 (age 17)	14	4	(Polish Football Association) Pogoń Szczecin
14	FW	Oliwia Związek	22 June 2007 (age 19)	13	3	(Polish Football Association) Lech Poznań UAM
19	FW	Kinga Wyrwas	21 January 2007 (age 19)	20	3	(Polish Football Association) Śląsk Wrocław

=== Previous squads ===
- 2025 UEFA Women's Under-19 Championship

== See also ==
- Poland women's national football team
- Poland women's national under-17 football team
- FIFA U-20 Women's World Cup
- UEFA Women's Under-19 Championship
