= Rekord Bielsko-Biała (football) =

Polish football club

BTS Rekord Bielsko-Biała
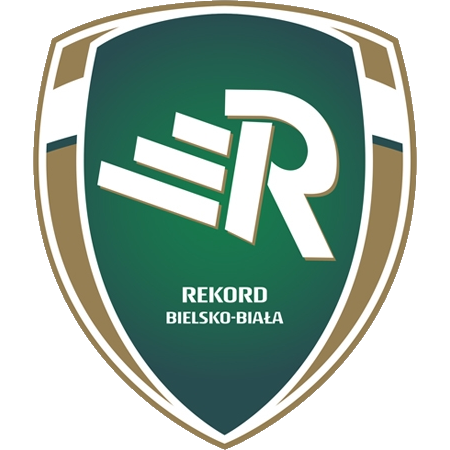
- Full name: Beskidzkie Towarzystwo Sportowe Rekord Bielsko-Biała
- Founded: 1999; 27 years ago
- Ground: Rekord Sports Center
- Capacity: 600
- Chairman: Janusz Szymura
- Manager: Artur Kosznicki
- League: II liga
- 2025–26: II liga, 9th of 18
- Website: bts.rekord.com.pl
Home colours	Away colours

BTS Rekord Bielsko-Biała is a Polish football club, based in Bielsko-Biała. As of the 2026–27 season, they compete in the II liga.

== History ==
The association football section was established in 1999, and started competing in Klasa C from the 1999–2000 season onwards.

After spending a few years in lower divisions, Rekord was promoted to the regional league in 2004, and went up to the fifth division four years later. On 30 June 2013, Rekord won the promotion play-off against Górnik Piaski, earning the right to compete in the III liga, where they would spend the following eleven seasons.

On 8 June 2024, Rekord sealed their first ever promotion to the third tier, after sealing a group III championship with a 2–1 victory over Górnik Polkowice.

== Current squad ==
As of 3 August 2026

Note: Flags indicate national team as defined under FIFA eligibility rules; some limited exceptions apply. Players may hold more than one non-FIFA nationality.

No.	Pos.	Nation	Player
1	GK	POL	Krzysztof Żerdka
3	DF	POL	Jan Sobociński
5	DF	POL	Mateusz Broda
6	MF	POL	Daniel Ściślak
7	MF	POL	Wojciech Łaski
8	DF	POL	Tomasz Boczek
9	MF	SVK	Denis Potoma
10	MF	POL	Jakub Ryś
11	FW	POL	Daniel Świderski
14	MF	POL	Michał Hornik
16	DF	POL	Dariusz Pawłowski
17	DF	POL	Adam Gibiec
18	MF	POL	Jakub Kempny
19	DF	POL	Kacper Kasprzak
21	MF	POL	Mateusz Tekieli

No.	Pos.	Nation	Player
24	DF	GER	Louis Poznański
28	FW	POL	Jan Ciućka
30	DF	POL	Konrad Kareta (captain)
33	DF	POL	Dawid Mazurek (on loan from Górnik Zabrze)
37	MF	POL	Maksymilian Sordyl
39	GK	POL	Wiktor Kaczorowski
67	MF	POL	Filip Sapiński
71	GK	POL	Sebastian Sobolewski
75	MF	POL	Piotr Wyroba
77	MF	POL	Piotr Ceglarz
80	MF	POL	Gabriel Kasprowicz
91	FW	POL	Mateusz Klichowicz
—	FW	POL	Konrad Duźniak
—	MF	POL	Jakub Wnęczak

=== Out on loan ===
Note: Flags indicate national team as defined under FIFA eligibility rules; some limited exceptions apply. Players may hold more than one non-FIFA nationality.

No.	Pos.	Nation	Player
13	DF	POL	Tymon Sobek (at Ruch Radzionków until 30 June 2027)
20	MF	POL	Michał Śliwka (at Sparta Katowice until 30 June 2027)

== Honours ==
- III liga
  - Champions: 2023–24 (group III)
- IV liga
  - Runners-up: 2010–11 (Silesia II), 2011–12 (Silesia II), 2012–13 (Silesia II)
- Regional league
  - Champions: 2007–08 (group: Bielsko-Biała)
- Klasa A
  - Runners-up: 2003–04 (group: Bielsko-Biała)
