= AP Orlen Gdańsk =

Polish association football club

AP 2010 Orlen Gdańsk
- Full name: Akademia Piłkarska 2010 Orlen Gdańsk
- Nicknames: APOG (since 2022); APLG (2010–2022)
- Founded: 19 August 2010; 15 years ago (as Akademia Piłkarska Lechia Gdańsk)
- Ground: Gdańsk Athletics and Rugby Stadium
- Capacity: 924
- Chairman: Tomasz Bocheński
- Manager: Maciej Kalkowski
- League: Ekstraliga
- 2025–26: Ekstraliga, 10th of 12
- Website: https://aplg.sportbm.com/
Home colours	Away colours

Akademia Piłkarska 2010 Orlen Gdańsk (English: Football Academy 2010 Orlen Gdańsk) is a footballing academy based in Gdańsk, Poland. It focuses on training and developing players in the Pomeranian region and is well known for its development of female players with the women's football team being the academies most successful section, with AP 2010 Orlen playing in the Ekstraliga, the highest division of women's football in Poland. The team name includes the name of their title sponsor and main funder of the academy, PKN Orlen, a Polish oil company.

AP 2010 Orlen has often been known as APLG during its early years due to these being the initials of the club's first two names, being formerly known as Akademia Piłkarska Lechia Gdańsk from 2010 to 2020, Akademia Piłkarska Lotos Gdańsk from 2020 to 2022, and then Akademia Piłkarska Orlen Gdańsk until 2025.

== History ==
APLG were founded in 2010 with close cooperation with Lechia Gdańsk and funded by the Lotos group. APLG became part of the "Football Future" program which is operated by Lotos, and has the goal of introducing football and promoting physical activities to children. APLG and Lechia Gdańsk had a cooperation agreement in place in which APLG would train players up to the age of 15 with those being good enough transferring into the Lechia Academy. After Lechia extended their own academy to include younger players the strong cooperation between Lechia and APLG started to break down. While the academy and Lechia still cooperate with each other the benefits shared are not as strong as they once were. Since 2015 APLG and the Lotos group have run the footballing academy as an independent entity.

In September 2020 the team removed all association with Lechia Gdańsk removing Lechia from its name and replacing it with Lotos, the Gdańsk based oil refinery which funded the club, becoming "Akademia Piłkarska Lotos Gdańsk" to be shortened as "AP Lotos Gdańsk". This name change was also due to the confusion with Lechia Gdańsk and some fans and those associated with ALPG feeling as though the team had no identity of their own. The name change to AP Lotos coincided with the women's team's promotion to the Ekstraliga.

In August 2022, Grupa Lotos were taken over by the Polish oil refining company, PKN Orlen. This takeover saw AP Lotos changing their name to AP Orlen. In the first year of Orlen's takeover, APOG reached the final of the Polish Cup for the first time, losing in the final to UKS SMS Łódź 5–0.

=== Club names ===
- Akademia Piłkarska Lechia Gdańsk (2010–2020)
- Akademia Piłkarska Lotos Gdańsk (2020–2022)
- Akademia Piłkarska Orlen Gdańsk (2022–2025)
- Akademia Piłkarska 2010 Orlen Gdańsk (2025–)

== Women's football ==
AP 2010 Orlen's women's football section was formed in 2014 and has enjoyed early success rising up the leagues, finishing runners-up and third in the III liga, and winners of both the II liga and I liga along their way to promotion to the Ekstraliga. 2020–21 was the club's first season in Poland's top league where the team finished in a respectable ninth place. They went one better in their second top flight season, finishing eighth.

=== Seasons ===
Season	League	Tier	Position	Matches	Points	W	D	L	GF	GA
2014–15	III liga (Pomeranian group)	IV	2nd	14	33	11	0	3	67	15
2015–16	III liga (Pomeranian group)	IV	3rd	22	41	12	2	7	66	38
2016–17	II liga (Wielkopolska group)	III	1st	20	50	16	2	2	85	23
2017–18	I liga (northern group)	II	9th	16	10	3	1	12	26	42
2018–19	I liga (northern group)	II	5th	22	33	10	3	9	66	44
2019–20 (Note: The 2019–20 season did not resume after the winter break due to the coronavirus pandemic. The season was later cancelled with only half of the games having been played.)	I liga (northern group)	II	1st	11	28	9	1	1	29	13
2020–21	Ekstraliga	I	9th	22	19	5	4	13	19	47
2021–22	Ekstraliga	I	8th	22	27	9	0	13	27	45
2022–23	Ekstraliga	I	8th	22	24	6	6	10	25	32
2023–24	Ekstraliga	I	5th	22	35	11	2	9	30	29
2024–25	Ekstraliga	I	7th	22	28	8	4	10	30	34
2025–26	Ekstraliga	I	10th	22	23	7	2	13	24	45

=== Colours ===
At the start, while the AP 2010 Orlen team was very closely linked with Lechia Gdańsk, they wore the Lechia kits and were using the team's colours. While the team still used green as a predominant colour after the gradual distancing of the two clubs, it had changed to dark grey, black, and white as of their first season in the Ekstraliga and when the team were known as AP Lotos. After becoming AP Orlen, black and pink were the predominant colours on the women's home kits.

== Academy graduates ==
Players of note who advanced through the APLG/APOG academy who either; played for their national team or played in the Ekstraklasa.

(Correct as of 16 June 2024)

2010's

- Karol Fila (2011–2014)
- Jakub Kałuziński (2013–2015) (Poland)
- Filip Koperski (2011–2013)
- Mateusz Sopoćko (2011–2015)
- Kacper Urbański (2013–2016) (Poland)

Key

Symbol	Meaning
	Played in the Ekstraklasa
(Poland)	Nationality the player represented during their international career

== Honours ==
=== Women's team ===
Polish Cup

- Runners-up (1): 2022–23

I liga (Northern group) (second tier)

- Champions (1): 2019–20 (Note: The 2019–20 season was cancelled after half of the games had been played due to the coronavirus pandemic. APLG were given the league title and promotion to the Ekstraliga as they were in first place at the league's cancellation.)

II liga (Wielkopolska group) (third tier)

- Champions (1): 2016–17

III liga (Pomeranian group) (fourth tier)

- Runners-up (1): 2014–15
- Third place (1): 2015–16
