= I liga (women's football) =

- Organising body: Polish Football Association (PZPN)
- Country: Poland
- Confederation: UEFA
- Divisions: 1
- Number of clubs: 12
- Level on pyramid: 2
- Promotion to: Ekstraliga
- Relegation to: II liga
- Domestic cup: Polish Cup
- Current champions: KS Uniwersytet Jagielloński (2024–25)

The I liga, officially known as Orlen I liga due to its sponsorship by Orlen, is the second tier of women's football league competition in Poland. It is organised and administered by the Polish Football Association (PZPN).

== Format ==
The league consists of a single group of twelve teams who play a double round-robin tournament, each team playing twice against each opponent, home and away. The teams who finish first and second earn a promotion to Ekstraliga, while the teams who finish in eleventh and twelfth are relegated to II liga.

== Teams (2025–26 season) ==
The following teams compete in the I liga as of the 2025–26 season, according to the official season calendar.

Team	Home city	Notes
Czarni Sosnowiec II	Sosnowiec	
Legionistki Warsaw	Warsaw	
1KS Ślęza Wrocław	Wrocław	
Medyk Konin	Konin	
KKP Bydgoszcz	Bydgoszcz	
KKP Unia Lublin	Lublin	
Stare Oborzyska	Stare Oborzyska	
Polonia Środa Wielkopolska	Środa Wielkopolska	
Resovia	Rzeszów	relegated from 2024–25 Ekstraliga
Skra Częstochowa	Częstochowa	relegated from 2024–25 Ekstraliga

== Teams (2024–25 season) ==
The following teams compete in the I liga as of the 2024–25 season, according to the official season calendar.

Team	Home city	Notes
Bielawianka Bielawa	Bielawa	
KKP Bydgoszcz	Bydgoszcz	
Czarni Sosnowiec II	Sosnowiec	reserve team, promoted from 2023 to 2024 II liga
Lech Poznań UAM	Poznań	
Legionistki Warsaw	Warsaw	
Medyk Konin	Konin	relegated from 2023–24 Ekstraliga
Polonia Środa Wielkopolska	Środa Wielkopolska	
Czwórka Radom	Radom	
1KS Ślęza Wrocław	Wrocław	
Stare Oborzyska	Stare Oborzyska	promoted from 2023 to 2024 II liga
3 Staszkówka Jelna	Jelna	
KS Uniwersytet Jagielloński	Kraków	relegated from 2023–24 Ekstraliga
