= Górnik Łęczna (women) =

Polish football club

Coordinates: 51°18′6.2″N 22°52′31.5″E

- Founded: 2002; 24 years ago
- Ground: Stadion Górnika Łęczna
- Capacity: 7,226
- Chairman: Dawid Osowski
- Manager: Piotr Mazurkiewicz
- League: Ekstraliga
- 2025–26: Ekstraliga, 4th of 12
- Website: http://gksgornik.leczna.pl/gks/gks/
Home colours	Away colours

Górnik Łęczna is a Polish women's football club from Łęczna, Lublin Voivodeship, founded in 2002. It is a section of the wider Górnik Łęczna sports-club.

The women's section of Górnik Łęczna played for years in the second and third tier leagues of Poland. In the 2006–07 season, the team reached the semi-finals of the Polish Cup but lost to Medyk Konin. In the 2009–10 season with the expansion of the Ekstraliga, the team finally gained promotion to it by finishing second in the I liga. In its Ekstraliga debut, Górnik finished 5th. They won the national double twice, in 2018 and 2020, with another Ekstraliga title in-between.

In the 2020–21 UEFA Women's Champions League season they reached the round of 32, defeated by Paris Saint-Germain.

== Honours ==
- Ekstraliga:
  - Champions (3): 2017–18, 2018–19, 2019–20
- Polish Cup:
  - Champions (2): 2017–18, 2019–20
- UEFA Women's Champions League:
  - Round of 32 (1): 2020–21

== European competitions ==
Season	Competition	Round		Opponent	Home	Away	Aggregate
2020–21	UEFA Champions League	First qualifying round	(Croatia)	Split	4–1	—N/a	4–1
2020–21	UEFA Champions League	Second qualifying round	(Cyprus)	Apollon Limassol	2–1	—N/a	2–1
2020–21	UEFA Champions League	Round of 32	(France)	Paris Saint-Germain	0–2	1–6	1–8
