= Czarni Sosnowiec =

Polish football club

Kolejowy Klub Sportowy Czarni Sosnowiec, commonly referred to as Czarni Sosnowiec, is a Polish football club from Sosnowiec, founded in 1924. Primarily focused on its women's department, Czarni had operated a men's section in the past.

== Women's football section ==
KKS Czarni Sosnowiec
- Full name: Kolejowy Klub Sportowy Czarni Sosnowiec
- Founded: April 1924; 102 years ago
- Ground: ArcelorMittalPark
- Capacity: 11,600
- Chairman: Robert Majewski
- Manager: Sebastian Stemplewski
- League: Ekstraliga
- 2025–26: Ekstraliga, 1st of 12 (champions)
- Website: www.czarnisosnowiec.pl

Women's football team, founded on 5 September 1974, holds the record for Polish championship titles won, with 14 titles to their name. After some financial problems in the 2007–08 season, the club was relegated from the top-flight; in 2008–09, they reached the promotion playoffs but lost convincingly. With the expansion of the Ekstraliga in 2010–11, a second-place finish was enough to ensure direct promotion again. In 2021, they won their first championship in over twenty years.

=== Honours ===
- Ekstraliga
  - Champions: 1979–80, 1980–81, 1983–84, 1984–85, 1985–86, 1986–87, 1988–89, 1990–91, 1996–97, 1997–98, 1998–99, 1999–00, 2020–21, 2025–26
- Polish Cup
  - Winners: 1984–85, 1986–87, 1988–89, 1994–95, 1995–96, 1996–97, 1997–98, 1998–99, 1999–2000, 2000–01, 2001–02, 2020–21, 2021–22, 2024–25

=== European competitions ===
Season	Competition	Round	Opponent	Home	Away	Aggregate
2021–22	UEFA Champions League	First qualifying round	(Hungary) Ferencváros	—N/a	1–2	—N/a
2026–27	UEFA Champions League	First qualifying round SF	(Georgia (country)) Nike Lusso	7–1	—N/a	—N/a
2026–27	UEFA Champions League	First qualifying round Final	(Republic of Ireland) Athlone Town	3–1	—N/a	—N/a
2026–27	UEFA Champions League	Second qualifying round SF	(Cyprus) Apollon Ladies	—N/a	3–3 (4–2 p)	—N/a
2026–27	UEFA Champions League	Second qualifying round Final	(Slovakia) Spartak Myjava	—N/a	4–2	—N/a
2026–27	UEFA Champions League	Third qualifying round	(Belgium) OH Leuven	1–4	1–2	2–6
2026–27	UEFA Europa Cup	Second qualifying round	(Iceland) Breiðablik	1–0	6–2	7–2
2026–27	UEFA Europa Cup	Round of 16	(Norway) Brann	1–5	0–3	1–8

== Men's football section ==
In the 2024–25 season, men's section of Czarni competed in the 9th-tier Klasa B, before withdrawing from competition during the winter break.
