= Ekstraliga (women's football) =

- Organising body: Polish Football Association (PZPN)
- Founded: 1979; 47 years ago
- Country: Poland
- Confederation: UEFA
- Divisions: 1
- Number of clubs: 12
- Level on pyramid: 1
- Relegation to: I liga
- Domestic cup: Polish Cup
- International cup: UEFA Champions League
- Current champions: Czarni Sosnowiec (14th title) (2025–26)
- Most championships: Czarni Sosnowiec (14 titles)
- Broadcaster: TVP Sport
- Current: 2026–27 Ekstraliga

The Ekstraliga (English: Extra League), officially known as Orlen Ekstraliga due to its sponsorship by Orlen, is the top Polish league for women's association football teams.

The league's first season was in 1979–80. Initially, it was called I liga polska kobiet. The first title holder was Czarni Sosnowiec. In 2005, the league was renamed to Ekstraliga kobiet. The winner of the league qualifies for the UEFA Women's Champions League.

Relegated teams descend to the I liga.

== Teams ==
Locations of teams in the 2026–27 Ekstraliga.

Team	Home city	Home ground	Capacity	2025–26 finish
AP Orlen Gdańsk	Gdańsk	Gdańsk Sports Center Stadium; Polsat Plus Arena Gdańsk	12,244; 41,620	10th
AZS UJ Kraków	Kraków	Uczelniane Centrum Sportowo-Rekreacyjne	1,224	9th
Czarni Antrans Sosnowiec	Sosnowiec	ArcelorMittal Park	11,600	1st
GKS Katowice	Katowice	GKS Katowice Stadium	6,710	3rd
Górnik Łęczna	Łęczna	Łęczna Stadium	7,226	4th
Grot SMS Łódź	Łódź	SMS Stadium	2,000	5th
Lech Poznań UAM	Poznań	GOSiR Stadium in Plewiska	600	8th
Legia Warsaw	Warsaw	Legia Training Center	1,000	1st in I liga
Pogoń Szczecin	Szczecin	Florian Krygier Municipal Stadium side-pitch no. 3	1,082	2nd
Rekord Bielsko-Biała	Bielsko-Biała	Rekord Sports Centre	600	6th
Śląsk Wrocław	Wrocław	Oporowska Stadium	8,346	7th
Ślęza Wrocław	Wrocław	Centrum Piłkarskie Kłokoczyce	800	2nd in I liga

== Format ==
Up to the 2009–10 season with six teams in the league, the teams played each other four times per season. Thus, each club was totalling 20 matches. The last-place finisher was relegated while the 5th-place finisher played a two-legged relegation play-off.

For the 2010–11 season, the whole women's football of Poland was reorganized. The number of teams in the Ekstraliga was increased from six to ten. For this to happen, two teams from each of the two 2nd divisions were promoted directly to the top tier, and the two 3rd-place finishers played a two-legged playoff with the winner playing a two-legged playoff against the 6th-place finisher from the Ekstraliga.

Since the 2014–15 season, 12 teams participate in the top-tier competition. Since the 2015–16 until the end of the 2019–20 campaign, after the regular season, the teams were divided into a championship and relegation group. Points scored during this stage were added to those of the regular season.

== List of champions ==
Season	Champion	Runner-up	Third place	Top scorer
1975 (unofficial)	TKKF Checz Gdynia	ZA Puławy	Karolina Jaworzyna Śląska (?)	
1976 (unofficial)	Checz Gdynia	LOT Warsaw		
1977	not held			
1978 (unofficial)	Checz Gdynia	LOT Warsaw	Karolina Jaworzyna Śląska (?)	
1979 (unofficial)	Checz Gdynia	Karolina Jaworzyna Śląska	Walter Radom	
1980	Czarni Sosnowiec	Checz Gdynia	LOT Warsaw	
1981	Czarni Sosnowiec	Pafawag Wrocław	Checz Gdynia	
1982	Pafawag Wrocław	Iskra Mierzyn	Telpod Kraków	
1983	Pafawag Wrocław	Czarni Sosnowiec	Telpod Kraków	
1984	Czarni Sosnowiec	Zagłębianka Dąbrowa Górnicza	Telpod Kraków	
1985	Czarni Sosnowiec	Pafawag Wrocław	Zagłębianka Dąbrowa Górnicza	
1986	Czarni Sosnowiec	Pafawag Wrocław		
1987	Czarni Sosnowiec	Pafawag Wrocław		
1988	Zagłębianka Dąbrowa Górnicza	Pafawag Wrocław		
1989	Czarni Sosnowiec	Zagłębianka Dąbrowa Górnicza		
1990	Zagłębianka Dąbrowa Górnicza	Pafawag Wrocław		
1991	Czarni Sosnowiec	Zagłębianka Dąbrowa Górnicza		
1992	Stilon Gorzów Wielkopolski	Czarni Sosnowiec		
1993	Piast Gliwice	Stilon Gorzów Wielkopolski		
1994	Piast Gliwice	Stilon Gorzów Wielkopolski		
1995	Stilon Gorzów Wielkopolski	Czarni Sosnowiec		
1996	Stilon Gorzów Wielkopolski	Czarni Sosnowiec		
1997	Czarni Sosnowiec	Stilon Gorzów Wielkopolski	Podgórze Kraków	
1998	Czarni Sosnowiec	Podgórze Kraków	KŚ AZS Wrocław	
1999	Czarni Sosnowiec	Podgórze Kraków	Medyk Konin	
2000	Czarni Sosnowiec	KŚ AZS Wrocław	Savena Warsaw	
2001	KŚ AZS Wrocław	Czarni Sosnowiec	Stilon Gorzów Wielkopolski	
2002	KŚ AZS Wrocław	Czarni Sosnowiec	KS Warta Atena Poznań	
2003	KŚ AZS Wrocław	Medyk Konin	Czarni Sosnowiec	
2004	KŚ AZS Wrocław	Medyk Konin	Czarni Sosnowiec	(Poland) Marta Otrębska (KŚ AZS Wrocław, 22 goals)
2005	KŚ AZS Wrocław	Czarni Sosnowiec	Medyk Konin	(Poland) Anna Żelazko (Czarni Sosnowiec, 25 goals)
2006	KŚ AZS Wrocław	Medyk Konin	Czarni Sosnowiec	(Poland) Anna Gawrońska (Medyk Konin, 11 goals)
2007	KŚ AZS Wrocław	Gol Częstochowa	Medyk Konin	(Poland) Anna Żelazko (KŚ AZS Wrocław, 18 goals)
2008	KŚ AZS Wrocław	Medyk Konin	RTP Unia Racibórz	(Poland) Anna Gawrońska (Medyk Konin, 25 goals)
2009	RTP Unia Racibórz	KŚ AZS Wrocław	Medyk Konin	(Poland) Anna Żelazko (KŚ AZS Wrocław, 29 goals)
2010	RTP Unia Racibórz	Medyk Konin	KŚ AZS Wrocław	(Poland) Anna Sznyrowska (RTP Unia Racibórz, 24 goals)
2011	RTP Unia Racibórz	Medyk Konin	KŚ AZS Wrocław	(Poland) Agnieszka Winczo (RTP Unia Racibórz, 27 goals)
2012	RTP Unia Racibórz	Medyk Konin	Górnik Łęczna	(Equatorial Guinea) Gloria Chinasa (RTP Unia Racibórz, 20 goals)
2013	RTP Unia Racibórz	Medyk Konin	Górnik Łęczna	(Equatorial Guinea) Gloria Chinasa (RTP Unia Racibórz, 18 goals)
2014	Medyk Konin	Górnik Łęczna	KŚ AZS Wrocław	(Poland) Anna Żelazko (RTP Unia Racibórz (12), Górnik Łęczna (11), 23 goals)
2015	Medyk Konin	Zagłębie Lubin	Górnik Łęczna	(Poland) Agata Tarczyńska (Zagłębie Lubin, 41 goals)
2016	Medyk Konin	Górnik Łęczna	Mitech Żywiec	(Poland) Anna Gawrońska (Medyk Konin, 23 goals)
2017	Medyk Konin	Górnik Łęczna	AZS PWSZ Wałbrzych	(Poland) Ewelina Kamczyk (Górnik Łęczna, 29 goals)
2018	Górnik Łęczna	Czarni Sosnowiec	Medyk Konin	(Poland) Ewelina Kamczyk (Górnik Łęczna, 35 goals)
2019	Górnik Łęczna	Medyk Konin	Czarni Sosnowiec	(Poland) Ewelina Kamczyk (Górnik Łęczna, 35 goals)
2020	Górnik Łęczna	Medyk Konin	Czarni Sosnowiec	(Poland) Ewelina Kamczyk (Górnik Łęczna, 22 goals)
2021	Czarni Sosnowiec	UKS SMS Łódź	Górnik Łęczna	(Poland) Ewelina Kamczyk (Górnik Łęczna, 27 goals)
2022	UKS SMS Łódź	Górnik Łęczna	Czarni Sosnowiec	(Poland) Dominika Kopińska (UKS SMS Łódź, 20 goals) (Nigeria) Chinonyerem Macleans (Górnik Łęczna, 20 goals)
2023	GKS Katowice	Górnik Łęczna	UKS SMS Łódź	(Poland) Dominika Kopińska (UKS SMS Łódź, 20 goals)
2024	Pogoń Szczecin	GKS Katowice	UKS SMS Łódź	(Poland) Natalia Oleszkiewicz (Pogoń Szczecin, 15 goals)
2025	GKS Katowice	Czarni Sosnowiec	Pogoń Szczecin	(Poland) Julia Piętakiewicz (Górnik Łęczna, 17 goals)
2026	Czarni Sosnowiec	Pogoń Szczecin	GKS Katowice	(Poland) Klaudia Miłek (Czarni Sosnowiec, 21 goals)

== Titles by club ==
Rank	Club	Titles
1	**Czarni Sosnowiec**	14
2	KŚ AZS Wrocław	8
3	RTP Unia Racibórz	5
4	**Checz Gdynia** (Note: All titles are unofficial.)	4
4	**Medyk Konin**	4
6	**Stilon Gorzów Wielkopolski**	3
7	**GKS Katowice**	2
7	**Górnik Łęczna**	2
7	Pafawag Wrocław	2
7	**Piast Gliwice**	2
7	Zagłębianka Dąbrowa Górnicza	2
12	**Pogoń Szczecin**	1
12	**SMS Łódź**	1

Still active teams are in bold.
