= Polish Cup (women's football) =

Puchar Polski kobiet
- Organiser(s): Polish Football Association (PZPN)
- Founded: 1984; 42 years ago
- Region: Poland
- Teams: 64
- Current champions: GKS Katowice (3rd title)
- Most championships: Czarni Sosnowiec (14 titles)

The Polish Women's Cup (Polish: Puchar Polski kobiet), officially known as Orlen Puchar Polski due to its sponsorship by Orlen, is the national women's football cup competition in Poland and was first held in the 1984–85 season.

GKS Katowice are the current holders, having defeated Czarni Sosnowiec in the 2026 final. Czarni hold the record for the most wins with fourteen, and have won eight editions in a row from 1994–95 to 2001–02.

== List of finals ==
Year	Winner	Result	Runner-up
1984–85	Czarni Sosnowiec		
1985–86	Pafawag Wrocław		
1986–87	Czarni Sosnowiec		
1987–88	Pafawag Wrocław		
1988–89	Czarni Sosnowiec		
1989–90	Zaglebianka Dabrowa Gornicza		
1990–91	ZTKKF Stilon Gorzow Wielkopolski		
1991–92	Stilon Gorzow Wielkopolski		
1992–93	Stilon Gorzow Wielkopolski		
1993–94	Sparta Zlotów		
1994–95	Czarni Sosnowiec		
1995–96	Czarni Sosnowiec		
1996–97	Czarni Sosnowiec		
1997–98	Czarni Sosnowiec		
1998–99	Czarni Sosnowiec		
1999–2000	Czarni Sosnowiec		
2000–01	Czarni Sosnowiec		
2001–02	Czarni Sosnowiec	1–1 (4–2 pen)	KS AZS Wrocław
2002–03	KS AZS Wrocław	5–2 (a.e.t.)	Medyk Konin
2003–04	KS AZS Wrocław	3–2	Medyk Konin
2004–05	Medyk Konin	2–0	Czarni Sosnowiec
2005–06	Medyk Konin	2–1	KS AZS Wrocław
2006–07	KS AZS Wrocław	3–1	Medyk Konin
2007–08	Medyk Konin	4–3 (a.e.t.)	RTP Unia Raciborz
2008–09	KS AZS Wrocław	3–0	TKKF Gryf Szczecin
2009–10	RTP Unia Racibórz	7–1	Pogoń Szczecin
2010–11	Unia Racibórz	2–0	Pogoń Szczecin
2011–12	Unia Racibórz	3–1	Medyk Konin
2012–13	Medyk Konin	2–1	RTP Unia Racibórz
2013–14	Medyk Konin	3–2	KS AZS Wrocław
2014–15	Medyk Konin	5–0	Górnik Łęczna
2015–16	Medyk Konin	5–0	Górnik Łęczna
2016–17	Medyk Konin	2–1	Górnik Łęczna
2017–18	Górnik Łęczna	3–1	Czarni Sosnowiec
2018–19	Medyk Konin	4–3	Czarni Sosnowiec
2019–20	Górnik Łęczna	1–0	Czarni Sosnowiec
2020–21	Czarni Sosnowiec	1–0	UKS SMS Łódź
2021–22	Czarni Sosnowiec	4–0	Śląsk Wrocław
2022–23	UKS SMS Łódź	5–0	AP Orlen Gdańsk
2023–24	GKS Katowice	3–0	Śląsk Wrocław
2024–25	Czarni Sosnowiec	1–1 (4–3 pen)	Pogoń Szczecin
2025–26	GKS Katowice	5–2 (a.e.t.)	Czarni Sosnowiec

== Performance by club ==
Club	Wins	Runners-up	Years won	Years Runners-up
Czarni Sosnowiec	14	7	1985, 1987, 1989, 1995, 1996, 1997, 1998, 1999, 2000, 2001, 2002, 2021, 2022, 2025	
Medyk Konin	9	5	2005, 2006, 2008, 2013, 2014, 2015, 2016, 2017, 2019	
Śląsk Wrocław	4	7	2003, 2004, 2007, 2009	
Stilon Gorzów Wielkopolski	3	5	1991, 1992, 1993	
Unia Racibórz	3	2	2010, 2011, 2012	
Górnik Łęczna	2	3	2018, 2020	
Pafawag Wrocław	2	2	1988, 1986	
GKS Katowice	2	0	2024, 2026	
UKS SMS Łódź	1	1	2023	
Zagłębianka Dąbrowa Górnicza	1	0	1990	
Sparta Złotów	1	0	1994	
Pogoń Szczecin	0	4		
Piast Gliwice	0	2		
Podgórze Kraków	0	2		
Savena AZS-AWF Warszawa	0	1		
AP Orlen Gdańsk	0	1		

== See also ==
- Polish Cup, men's edition
