= Dżesika Jaszek =

Polish footballer

Personal information
- Full name: Dżesika Karina Jaszek
- Date of birth: 4 April 1996 (age 30)
- Place of birth: Cyprzanów, Poland
- Position: Forward

Team information
- Current team: GKS Katowice
- Number: 77

Senior career*
Years	Team	Apps	(Gls)
- LKS Cyprzanów
- Unia Racibórz II
- LKS Gamów
- Czarni Sosnowiec
2012–2014	Unia Racibórz		(1)
2014–2018	Górnik Łęczna		(23)
2018–2023	Czarni Sosnowiec	64	(47)
2023–2024	GKS Katowice	19	(7)
2024–2025	Fenerbahçe	14	(3)
2025–	GKS Katowice	17	(1)

International career
2013	Poland U17		
2018–2019	Poland	13	(1)
Medal record
Representing Poland
Women's football
UEFA Women's Under-17 Championship
Winner	2013 Switzerland
- * Club domestic league appearances and goals as of 20:42, 2 June 2026 (UTC)

Dżesika Karina Jaszek (born 4 April 1996) is a Polish professional footballer who plays as a forward for Ekstraliga club GKS Katowice. She has played for the Poland national team. She won the UEFA Women's Under-17 Championship with Poland in 2013, as well as numerous domestic trophies.

== Career ==
Jaszek has been capped for the Poland national team, appearing for the team during the 2019 FIFA Women's World Cup qualifying cycle.

== Career statistics ==
=== International ===
Appearances and goals by national team and year
National team	Year	Apps	Goals
Poland	2018	9	1
Poland	2019	4	0
Total		13	1

Scores and results list Poland's goal tally first, score column indicates score after each Jaszek goal.

List of international goals scored by Dżesika Jaszek
No.	Date	Venue	Opponent	Score	Result	Competition
1	12 June 2018	Kolporter Arena, Kielce, Poland	Scotland	1–0	2–3	2019 FIFA World Cup qualification

== Honours ==
Unia Racibórz

- Ekstraliga: 2011–12, 2012–13
- Polish Cup: 2011–12

Górnik Łęczna

- Ekstraliga: 2017–18
- Polish Cup: 2017–18

Czarni Sosnowiec

- Ekstraliga: 2020–21
- Polish Cup: 2020–21, 2021–22

GKS Katowice

- Polish Cup: 2023–24, 2025–26

Poland U17

- UEFA Women's Under-17 Championship: 2013

Individual

- Polish Cup top scorer: 2017–18
