= Natasza Górnicka =

Polish footballer

Personal information
- Date of birth: 16 July 1989 (age 37)
- Place of birth: Opole, Poland
- Height: 1.71 m (5 ft 7 in)
- Position: Defender

Senior career*
Years	Team	Apps	(Gls)
- Rolnik Biedrzychowice
- Unia Opole
–2008	Medyk Konin		
2008–2011	KŚ AZS Wrocław		(2)
2012–2014	Unia Racibórz		(1)
2014–2022	Górnik Łęczna		

International career
2008–2017	Poland	33	(0)
- * Club domestic league appearances and goals

Natasza Górnicka (born 16 July 1989) is a Polish former footballer who played as a defender. She made 33 appearances for the Poland national team.

== Career ==
Górnicka has been capped for the Poland national team, appearing for the team during the 2019 FIFA Women's World Cup qualifying cycle.

== Career statistics ==
=== International ===
Appearances and goals by national team and year
National team	Year	Apps	Goals
Poland	2008	1	0
Poland	2009	5	0
Poland	2010	5	0
Poland	2011	3	0
Poland	2012	6	0
Poland	2014	6	0
Poland	2016	1	0
Poland	2017	6	0
Total		33	0

== Honours ==
Unia Racibórz

- Ekstraliga: 2011–12, 2012–13
- Polish Cup: 2011–12

Górnik Łęczna

- Ekstraliga: 2017–18, 2018–19, 2019–20
- Polish Cup: 2017–18, 2019–20
