= 2016–17 Polish Women's Cup =

The 2016–17 Polish Cup in women's football was the 33rd edition of the competition. Medyk Konin won its fifth title in a row after defeating Górnik Łęczna in the final, like in the two previous editions, but this time by a narrower 2–1 scoreline.

== Results ==
Preliminary Round
Górnik Łęczna II	2
Sokół Kolbuszowa	1
Sukces Gmina Oleśnica	1
Rolnik Biedrzychow. (p)	1
Helios Białystok	0
Praga Warsaw	7
Sparta Dalescyze	0
UJ Kraków	4
Medyk Konin II	3
Stilon Gorzów	0
Lechia Gdańsk	1
KS Stargard	10
GKS Katowice	2
UKS Łódź	3
Stomil Olsztyn	3
KKP Bydgoszcz	0

Round of 16
Górnik Łęczna II	0
Górnik Łęczna	13
Rolnik Biedrzychowice	3
PWSZ Wałbrzych	9
Praga Warsaw	4
PWSZ Biała Podlaska	3
UJ Kraków	1
Mitech Żywiec	6
Medyk Konin II	4
AZS Wrocław	1
KS Stargard	2
Sztorm Gdańsk (p)	2
UKS Łódź	1
Czarni Sosnowiec	0
Stomil Olsztyn	0
Medyk Konin	12

Quarterfinals
Górnik Łęczna	3
PWSZ Wałbrzych	0
Praga Warsaw	1
Mitech Żywiec	2
Medyk Konin II	3
Sztorm Gdańsk	0
UKS Łódź	0
Medyk Konin	8

Semifinals
Górnik Łęczna	2
Mitech Żywiec	1
Medyk Konin II	2
Medyk Konin	8

Final
Górnik Łęczna	1
Medyk Konin	2

=== Final match ===
31 May 2017

Medyk Konin	2–1	Górnik Łęczna
Guściora 33'; Sikora 36'	Report	Zdunek 90+2'

MOSiR Stadium, Radom
Attendance: 3,420
Referee: Tokarska
