= Marta Mika =

Polish footballer (born 1983)

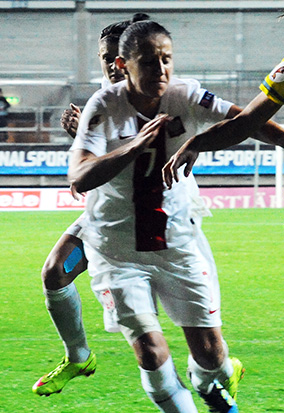
- Mika with Poland in 2015

Personal information
- Full name: Marta Mika
- Date of birth: 8 July 1983 (age 43)
- Place of birth: Poland
- Position: Defender

Senior career*
Years	Team	Apps	(Gls)
- Gol Częstochowa
2008–2009	Mitech Żywiec		
2010–2013	Unia Racibórz		
2014–2015	Zagłębie Lubin		
2015–2016	Blau-Weiß Hohen Neuendorf	24	(1)
2016–2017	Czarni Sosnowiec		
2018	Stradom Częstochowa	11	(3)
2018–2019	Skra Częstochowa	13	(0)

International career
2007–2016	Poland	44	(0)

Managerial career
- 2018–2022: Skra Częstochowa
- 2022–2023: Raków Częstochowa
- * Club domestic league appearances and goals

Marta Mika (born 8 July 1983) is a Polish football manager and former professional player who played as a defender. She was most recently the assistant coach of the Poland national team.

She was a member of the national team from 2007 to 2016.

== Career statistics ==
=== International ===
Appearances and goals by national team and year
National team	Year	Apps	Goals
Poland	2007	5	0
Poland	2009	5	0
Poland	2010	4	0
Poland	2011	7	0
Poland	2012	4	0
Poland	2013	5	0
Poland	2014	6	0
Poland	2015	7	0
Poland	2016	1	0
Total		44	0

== Honours ==
Unia Racibórz

- Ekstraliga: 2009–10, 2010–11, 2011–12, 2012–13
- Polish Cup: 2009–10, 2010–11, 2011–12
