= Hanna Konsek =

Polish footballer

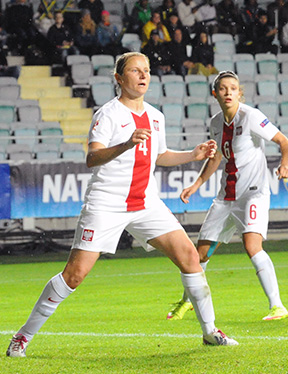
- Konsek in 2015

Personal information
- Date of birth: 21 January 1987 (age 39)
- Place of birth: Poland
- Position: Midfielder

Senior career*
Years	Team	Apps	(Gls)
2002–2014	Unia Racibórz		
2014	Blau-Weiß Hohen Neuendorf	13	(1)
2014–2016	1. FC Lübars	22	(0)
2016–2017	Blau-Weiß Hohen Neuendorf	42	(1)

International career
2006–2016	Poland	32	(0)
- * Club domestic league appearances and goals

Hanna Konsek (born 21 January 1987) is a Polish former professional footballer who played as a midfielder. She has been a member of the Poland women's national team since 2006.

== Career statistics ==
=== International ===
Appearances and goals by national team and year
National team	Year	Apps	Goals
Poland	2006	1	0
Poland	2007	5	0
Poland	2009	7	0
Poland	2011	4	0
Poland	2012	2	0
Poland	2015	5	0
Poland	2016	8	0
Total		32	0

== Honours ==
Unia Racibórz

- Ekstraliga: 2008–09, 2009–10, 2010–11, 2011–12, 2012–13
- Polish Cup: 2009–10, 2010–11, 2011–12
