= Agata Tarczyńska =

Polish footballer (born 1988)

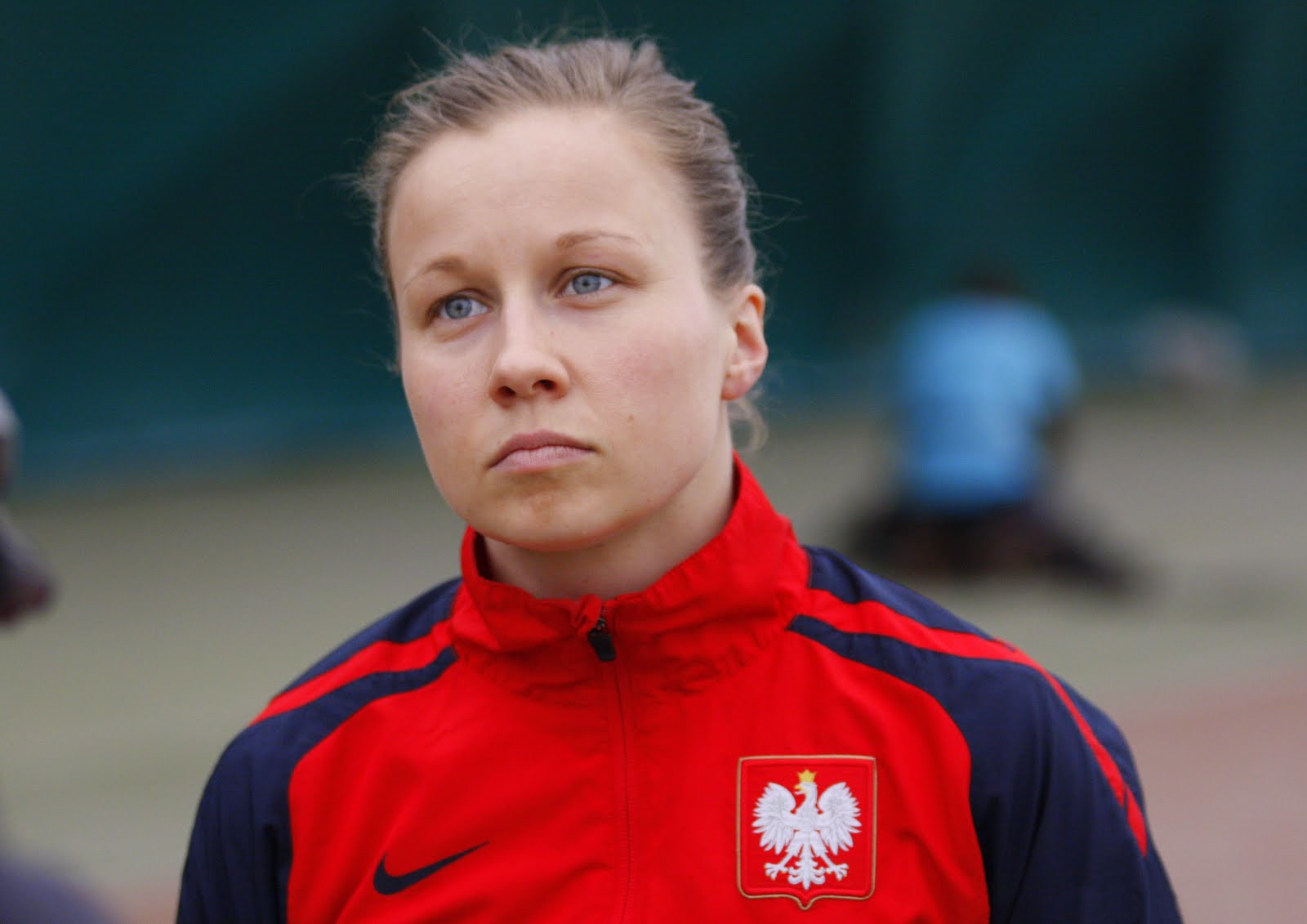
- Tarczyńska with Poland in 2013

Personal information
- Date of birth: 27 June 1988 (age 38)
- Place of birth: Jelenia Góra, Poland
- Height: 1.69 m (5 ft 7 in)
- Positions: Midfielder; striker

Senior career*
Years	Team	Apps	(Gls)
2003–2005	AZS Wrocław	18	(10)
2005–2006	1. FC Saarbrücken	17	(3)
2006–2008	Medyk Konin		(14)
2008–2011	AZS Wrocław		(22)
2009	→ 1. FC Saarbrücken (loan)	0	(0)
2011–2012	Unia Racibórz		(12)
2013	Bardenbach	12	(6)
2013	Blau-Weiß Hohen Neuendorf	9	(1)
2014	MSV Duisburg	12	(1)
2014–2015	Zagłębie Lubin	22	(41)
2015–2016	Medyk Konin	22	(20)
2016–2020	VfL Wolfsburg II	45	(31)
2020–2023	Werder Bremen	25	(5)

International career
2007–2022	Poland	63	(10)
- * Club domestic league appearances and goals

Agata Tarczyńska (born 27 June 1988) is a Polish former professional footballer who played as a midfielder or striker.

== Club career ==
Tarczyńska's first team was AZS Wrocław, and she first played the UEFA Women's Cup with it at the age of 15.

In 2005 Tarczyńska signed for 1. FC Saarbrücken in the 2. Bundesliga. The next season she returned to Poland, playing two seasons for Medyk Konin, three for AZS Wroclaw and one for Unia Racibórz.

In the 2012–13 winter transfer window, she signed for SV Bardenbach in the 2. Bundesliga. She started the 2013–14 season in the same category with Blau-Weiß Hohen Neuendorf before moving to MSV Duisburg in the Bundesliga in the winter transfer window.

Duisburg was almost relegated, and Tarczyńska returned to Poland. She played one season for Zagłębie Lubin before returning to Medyk Konin for the 2015–16 season.

== International career ==
She was a member of the Poland national team.

== Career statistics ==
=== International ===
Appearances and goals by national team and year
National team	Year	Apps	Goals
Poland	2007	1	0
Poland	2008	8	0
Poland	2009	10	1
Poland	2010	9	2
Poland	2011	8	0
Poland	2012	6	0
Poland	2014	2	0
Poland	2015	1	1
Poland	2016	1	0
Poland	2017	9	5
Poland	2018	1	0
Poland	2019	1	0
Poland	2020	3	1
Poland	2022	3	0
Total		63	10

== Honours ==
AZS Wrocław

- Ekstraliga: 2001–02, 2002–03, 2003–04
- Polish Cup: 2002–03, 2003–04, 2008–09

Medyk Konin

- Ekstraliga: 2015–16
- Polish Cup: 2005–06, 2007–08, 2015–16

Unia Racibórz

- Ekstraliga: 2011–12
- Polish Cup: 2011–12

Individual

- Ekstraliga top scorer: 2014–15
- Polish Cup top scorer: 2015–16
