= Natalia Chudzik =

Polish football attacking midfielder

Personal information
- Full name: Natalia Chudzik
- Date of birth: 8 August 1989 (age 37)
- Place of birth: Poland
- Positions: Midfielder; striker

Team information
- Current team: Czarni Sosnowiec
- Number: 8

Senior career*
| Years | Team | Apps | (Gls) |
| 2006–2011 | Medyk Konin | | (45) |
| 2011–2013 | Unia Racibórz | | (5) |
| 2014–2015 | Górnik Łęczna | | |
| 2015–2022 | Medyk Konin | | |
| 2022–2023 | Freedom FC | | |
| 2023– | Czarni Sosnowiec | 52 | (4) |
| 2025–2026 | Czarni Sosnowiec II | 3 | (0) |

International career
| 2008–2021 | Poland | 87 | (7) |
- * Club domestic league appearances and goals as of 22:05, 2 June 2026 (UTC)

Natalia Chudzik (born 8 August 1989) is a Polish footballer who plays as an attacking midfielder for Ekstraliga club Czarni Sosnowiec. She previously played for Unia Racibórz after she had a first spell at Medyk Konin. The 2011–12 season marked her Champions League debut.

She was a member of the Poland national team.

== Career statistics ==
=== International ===
Appearances and goals by national team and year
| National team | Year | Apps | Goals |
|---|---|---|---|
| Poland | 2008 | 2 | 0 |
| Poland | 2009 | 11 | 1 |
| Poland | 2010 | 9 | 1 |
| Poland | 2011 | 8 | 0 |
| Poland | 2012 | 7 | 0 |
| Poland | 2013 | 5 | 1 |
| Poland | 2014 | 9 | 0 |
| Poland | 2015 | 10 | 3 |
| Poland | 2016 | 6 | 0 |
| Poland | 2017 | 2 | 0 |
| Poland | 2018 | 4 | 1 |
| Poland | 2019 | 9 | 0 |
| Poland | 2020 | 4 | 0 |
| Poland | 2021 | 1 | 0 |
| Total | | 87 | 7 |

== Honours ==
Unia Racibórz

- Ekstraliga: 2011–12, 2012–13
- Polish Cup: 2011–12

Medyk Konin

- Ekstraliga: 2015–16, 2016–17
- Polish Cup: 2015–16, 2016–17, 2018–19

Czarni Sosnowiec

- Ekstraliga: 2025–26
- Polish Cup: 2024–25
