= Shemetov =

Shemetov (masculine), Shemetova (feminine) is a Russian-language surname. Notable people with the surname include:

- Aleksei Shemetov
- Sergei Shemetov
- Vladimir Shemetov
- Vitaly Shemetov

== See also ==
- Šėmeta
