= Ewelina Kamczyk =

Polish footballer (born 1996)

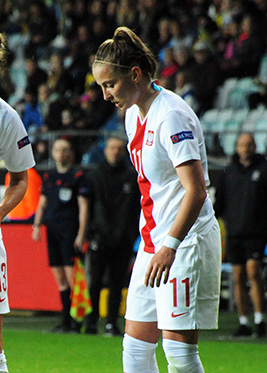
- Kamczyk with Poland in 2015

Personal information
- Date of birth: 22 February 1996 (age 30)
- Place of birth: Wodzisław Śląski, Poland
- Height: 1.65 m (5 ft 5 in)
- Positions: Midfielder; wing-back

Team information
- Current team: Milan
- Number: 80

Youth career
- LKS Krzyżanowice

Senior career*
Years	Team	Apps	(Gls)
2011–2013	Czarni Gorzyce	2+	(2+)
2013–2014	RTP Unia Racibórz	17	(0)
2014–2015	Medyk Konin	26	(22)
2015–2021	Górnik Łęczna	138	(162)
2021–2026	Fleury	110	(22)
2026–	Milan	11	(1)

International career^{‡}
–2013	Poland U17	10	(1)
2013–2014	Poland U19	6	(2)
2014–	Poland	114	(18)
Medal record
Representing Poland
Women's football
UEFA Women's Under-17 Championship
Winner	2013 Switzerland
- * Club domestic league appearances and goals as of 10:24, 6 October 2026 (UTC) ‡ National team caps and goals as of 22:32, 13 October 2026 (UTC)

Ewelina Kamczyk (born 22 February 1996) is a Polish professional footballer who plays as a midfielder or wing-back for Serie A Femminile club Milan and the Poland national team.

With 114 appearances, she is the most capped player in Poland's history, and has represented her country at the UEFA Women's Euro 2025.

== Career statistics ==
=== International ===
As of match played 13 October 2026

Appearances and goals by national team and year
National team	Year	Apps	Goals
Poland	2014	8	3
Poland	2015	10	1
Poland	2016	13	1
Poland	2017	12	5
Poland	2018	12	3
Poland	2019	7	1
Poland	2020	2	0
Poland	2021	9	0
Poland	2022	3	0
Poland	2023	5	0
Poland	2024	12	1
Poland	2025	13	2
Poland	2026	8	1
Total		114	18

Scores and results list Poland's goal tally first, score column indicates score after each Kamczyk goal.

List of international goals scored by Ewelina Kamczyk
No.	Date	Venue	Opponent	Score	Result	Competition
1	16 July 2014	Znicz Pruszków Stadium, Pruszków, Poland	Estonia	3–0	5–1	Friendly
2	17 September 2014	OSiR Stadium, Włocławek, Poland	Bosnia and Herzegovina	3–0	3–1	2015 FIFA World Cup qualification
3	30 October 2014	Stadion Sportowy Bruk-Bet Termalica, Nieciecza, Poland	Slovakia	1–0	4–1	Friendly
4	6 April 2015	Eerikkilä, Tammela, Finland	Finland	1–0	3–1	Friendly
5	9 March 2016	GSZ Stadium, Larnaca, Cyprus	Austria	1–1	1–2	2016 Cyprus Women's Cup final
6	8 June 2017	Stadion Yuvileinyi, Bucha, Ukraine	Ukraine	2–1	3–2	Friendly
7	12 June 2017	Municipal Stadium, Łomża, Poland	Lithuania	1–0	5–0	Friendly
8	15 September 2017	Łęczna Stadium, Łęczna, Poland	Belarus	2–0	4–1	2019 FIFA World Cup qualification
9	19 October 2017	Municipal Stadium, Ostróda, Poland	Estonia	6–0	6–0	Friendly
10	23 October 2017	Municipal Stadium, Ostróda, Poland	Greece	2–0	3–0	Friendly
11	31 August 2018	Traktor Stadium, Minsk, Belarus	Belarus	3–1	4–1	2019 FIFA World Cup qualification
12	9 October 2018	Municipal Stadium, Ostróda, Poland	Republic of Ireland	3–0	4–0	Friendly
13	13 November 2018	Municipal Stadium, Kluczbork, Poland	Bosnia and Herzegovina	3–0	4–0	Friendly
14	3 October 2019	Dimotiko Stadio, Ayia Napa, Cyprus	Cyprus	2–0	5–1	Friendly
15	9 April 2024	Gdynia Municipal Stadium, Gdynia, Poland	Austria	1–1	1–3	UEFA Euro 2025 qualifying
16	21 February 2025	Gdańsk Stadium, Gdańsk, Poland	Northern Ireland	1–0	2–0	2025 UEFA Nations League
17	3 June 2025	Gdańsk Stadium, Gdańsk, Poland	Romania	1–0	3–0	2025 UEFA Nations League
18	9 June 2026	Asito Stadion, Almelo, Netherlands	Netherlands	1–3	1–3	2027 FIFA Women's World Cup qualification

== Honours ==
Medyk Konin

- Ekstraliga: 2014–15
- Polish Cup: 2014–15

Górnik Łęczna

- Ekstraliga: 2017–18, 2018–19, 2019–20
- Polish Cup: 2017–18, 2019–20

Poland U17

- UEFA Women's Under-17 Championship: 2013

Individual

- Ekstraliga top scorer: 2016–17, 2017–18, 2018–19, 2019–20, 2020–21
