= Nina Patalon =

Polish footballer

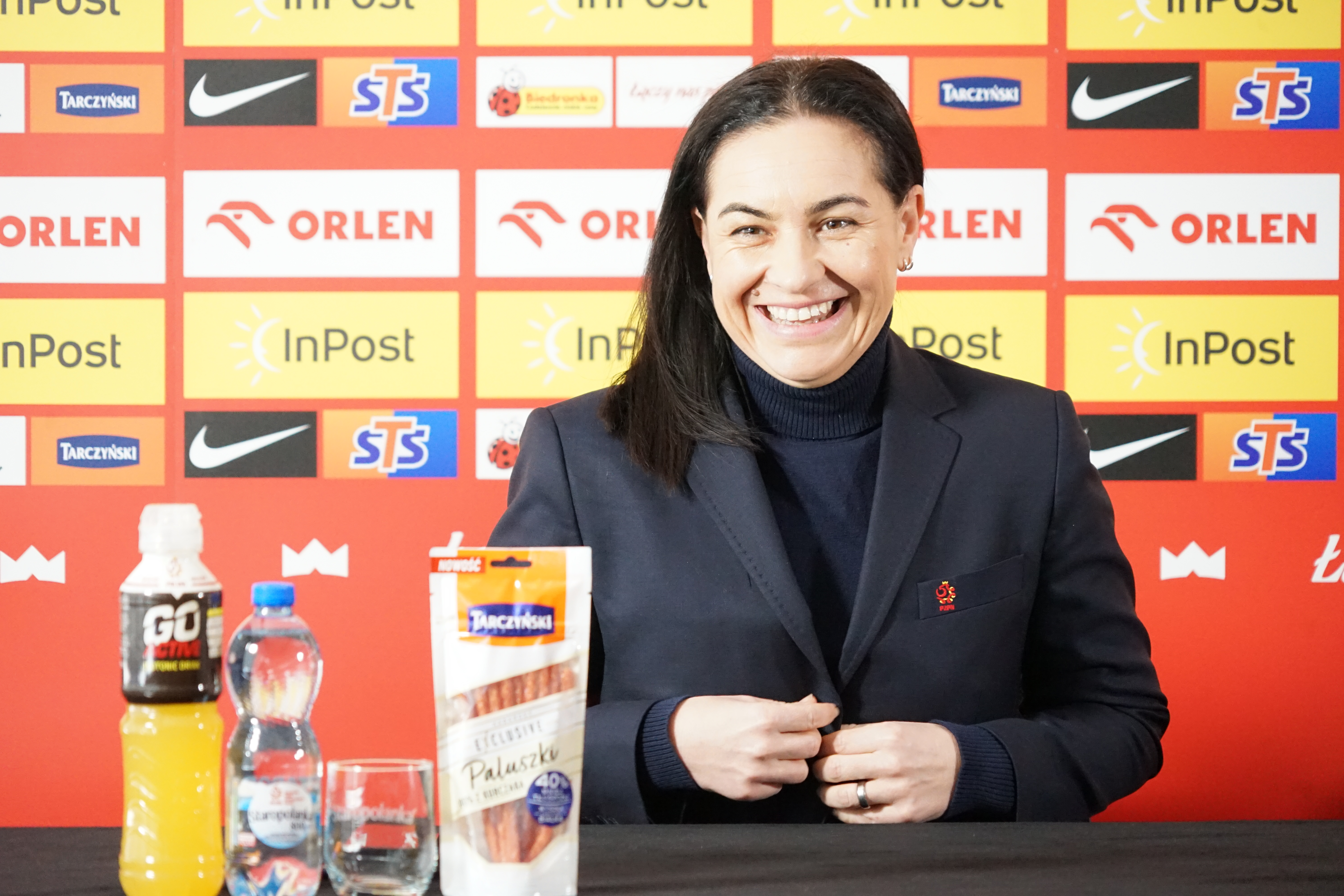
- Patalon at a press conference in 2017

Personal information
- Date of birth: 20 January 1986 (age 40)
- Place of birth: Działdowo, Poland
- Position: Midfielder

Team information
- Current team: Poland women's (head coach)

Senior career*
Years	Team	Apps	(Gls)
2002–	Medyk Konin		
- Czarni Sosnowiec
–2011	Medyk Konin		

International career
2004–2006	Poland U19		
2009	Poland (students)		

Managerial career
- 2010–2013: Medyk Konin (youth)
- 2011–2013: Medyk Konin
- 2011–2013: Poland U15 (assistant)
- 2014–2019: Poland U17
- 2019–2021: Poland U19
- 2021–: Poland
- * Club domestic league appearances and goals

Nina Patalon (born 20 January 1986) is a Polish professional football manager and former player who played as a midfielder, currently in charge of Poland women's national team.

== Club career ==
In 2002, Patalon began her career at Medyk Konin in the Ekstraliga, where she had played for many years, with an in-between stint at Czarni Sosnowiec.

== International career ==
From 2004 to 2006, she was a member of the under-19 national team. In 2009, she represented Poland as part of a students' team at the Summer Universiade 2009 in Belgrade. The later stage of her career, however, was plagued by injuries for which she underwent seven knee surgeries.

== Managerial career ==
After retiring from a playing career she began working as a coach. Initially, from 2010, she trained Medyk Konin's youth team and, in January 2011, became the co-head coach of the Medyk's senior squad, alongside Anna Gawrońska. In 2011, she took on a role as assistant coach for the under-15 squad, and in May 2014 she was appointed to the managerial position of the Poland U17s.

In March 2021, she replaced Miłosz Stępiński as the head coach of the senior women's national team, becoming the first female coach in history to hold this position. She made her debut in a friendly match against Sweden on 13 April 2021.

In December 2024, she led Poland to their first ever major international tournament, the UEFA Women's Euro 2025, after defeating Austria in the second round of the qualifying play-offs. At the tournament, she led Poland to a win and two losses in the group stage.

Patalon has said that, in order for Poland to develop a stronger women's football capability, more awareness and funding is needed, and girls must receive more encouragement to take up the sport during school sports classes.

== Personal life ==
Patalon graduated with a bachelor from the State University of Applied Sciences in Konin and with a Masters from the Poznan University of Physical Education, where she obtained a Class II football coaching licence.

== Managerial statistics ==
As of match played 13 October 2026

Managerial record by team and tenure
Team	From	To	Record							
Team	From	To	G	W	D	L	GF	GA	GD	Win %
Poland	23 March 2021	Present	64	31	10	23	122	98	+24	48.44
Total			64	31	10	23	122	98	+24	48.44

== Honours ==
=== Player ===
Medyk Konin

- Ekstraliga runner-up: 2004–05, 2006–07, 2007–08, 2010–11
- Ekstraliga third place: 2003–04, 2008–09
- Polish Cup: 2004–05, 2005–06, 2008–09
- Polish Junior Championships: 2004, 2005, 2006

=== Manager ===
Medyk Konin

- Ekstraliga runner-up: 2011–12, 2012–13
- Polish Cup: 2012–13; runner-up: 2011–12
