= Emilia Zdunek =

Polish footballer (born 1992)

Personal information
- Date of birth: 12 September 1992 (age 34)
- Place of birth: Szczecin, Poland
- Height: 1.65 m (5 ft 5 in)
- Position: Midfielder

Team information
- Current team: Śląsk Wrocław (manager)

Youth career
- 2002–2007: UKS Victoria SP 2 Sianów

Senior career*
Years	Team	Apps	(Gls)
2007–2008	UKS Victoria SP 2 Sianów		
2008–2013	Pogoń Szczecin	49	(23)
2013	Unia Racibórz	9	(8)
2014	1. FC AZS AWF Katowice	7	(13)
2014	Zagłębie Lubin	43	(16)
2016–2019	Górnik Łęczna	73	(45)
2019–2020	Sevilla	17	(2)
2020–2021	Górnik Łęczna	16	(9)
2021–2022	GKS Katowice	13	(2)
2022–2024	Pogoń Szczecin	48	(26)

International career
2008–2009	Poland U17	3	(0)
2009–2010	Poland U19	8	(3)
2016–2024	Poland	32	(1)

Managerial career
- 2026–: Śląsk Wrocław
- * Club domestic league appearances and goals

Emilia Zdunek (born 12 September 1992) is a Polish professional football manager and former player who played as a midfielder. She is currently in charge of Ekstraliga club Śląsk Wrocław.

== Career statistics ==
=== International ===
Appearances and goals by national team and year
National team	Year	Apps	Goals
Poland	2016	1	0
Poland	2017	10	0
Poland	2018	8	1
Poland	2019	6	0
Poland	2020	4	0
Poland	2021	2	0
Poland	2024	1	0
Total		32	1

Scores and results list Poland's goal tally first, score column indicates score after each Zdunek goal.

List of international goals scored by Emilia Zdunek
No.	Date	Venue	Opponent	Score	Result	Competition
1	13 November 2018	Municipal Stadium, Kluczbork, Poland	Bosnia and Herzegovina	2–0	4–0	Friendly

== Managerial statistics ==
Managerial record by team and tenure
Team	From	To	Record							
Team	From	To	G	W	D	L	GF	GA	GD	Win %
Śląsk Wrocław	22 June 2026	Present	0	0	0	0	0	0	+0	—
Total			0	0	0	0	0	0	+0	—

== Honours ==
Pogoń Szczecin

- Ekstraliga: 2023–24
- I liga North: 2009–10

Górnik Łęczna

- Ekstraliga: 2017–18, 2018–19
- Polish Cup: 2017–18
