= Natasza =

Natasza is a given name. Notable people with the name include:

- Natasza Goerke (born 1962), Polish writer
- Natasza Górnicka (born 1989), Polish footballer
- Natasza Urbańska (born 1977), Polish actress
- Natasza Zurek (born 1978), Canadian snowboarder
- Natasza Zylska (1933–1995), Polish singer
