= Šėmeta =

Lithuanian-language surname

- Lithuanian surname
- m.: Šemeta
- f.: (unmarried): Šemetaitė
- f.: (married): Šemetienė

Šėmeta is a Lithuanian-language surname. It belongs to the Šemetos Lithuanian noble family whose progenitor was Šemeta Nameikaitis, known since the 15th century. Polonized variants of the surname include Szemiot, Szemioth, Szemiott, Szemet; Russified: Shemet. A derived surname is Shemetov.

Notable people with the surname include:

- Algirdas Šemeta (born 1962), Lithuanian economist and politician
- Pranciškus Šemeta (1802–1882), Lithuanian military figure, one of the military leaders of the November Uprising
