= Stanislava Lišková =

Slovak footballer

Stanislava Líšková
Personal information
- Date of birth: 15 March 1997 (age 29)
- Position: Forward

Team information
- Current team: Ružomberok

Youth career
- ŠKF VIX Žilina

Senior career*
Years	Team	Apps	(Gls)
2016–2018	Czarni Sosnowiec		
2018–2019	Mitech Żywiec	22	(1)
2019–2020	Medyk Konin	11	(0)
2020–2021	ROW Rybnik	18	(4)
2023–	Ružomberok		

International career
- Slovakia
- * Club domestic league appearances and goals as of 5 November 2021

Stanislava Líšková (born 15 March 1997) is a Slovak footballer who plays as a forward for Ružomberok. She has played for the Slovakia women's national team.

== Career ==
Lišková has been capped for the Slovakia national team, appearing for the team during the 2019 FIFA Women's World Cup qualifying cycle.
