= 2017–18 Ekstraliga (women's football) =

Ekstraliga
- Season: 2017–18
- Dates: 5 August 2017 – 27 May 2018
- Champions: Górnik Łęczna
- Relegated: Unifreeze Górzno; Sportowa Czwórka Radom
- Champions League: Górnik Łęczna
- Matches: 162
- Top goalscorer: Ewelina Kamczyk (35 goals)
- Biggest home win: Czarni 10–0 Unifreeze (9 September 2017); Górnik 10–0 Olimpia (18 November 2017)
- Biggest away win: Unifreeze 1–10 Górnik (24 September 2017); Unifreeze 0–9 AZS Wałbrzych (19 August 2017)
- Highest scoring: AZS Kraków 4–8 Górnik (11 March 2018)

The 2017–18 Ekstraliga was the 39th edition of the top level women's football league of Poland.

Medyk Konin were the defending champions, having won their fourth title in the previous season. Sportowa Czwórka Radom were promoted from the southern group of the I liga having won the 2016–17 campaign. Unifreeze Górzno were promoted from the northern group after finishing second behind Medyk II Konin, a reserve team which cannot be promoted to the top tier.

The campaign began on 5 August 2017. The winter break started after the 14th matchday (18 November). The first match of the spring was held on March 10. The campaign was concluded on 27 May 2018.

During the regular season, each team played 22 matches. After the 22nd round, based on their performance in the regular season, the clubs were split into two groups – the championship group (places 1–6) and the relegation group (places 7–12). Afterwards, each team played 5 more matches bringing the total to 27. The points scored during both stages were added up. At the end of the season, the bottom two clubs were demoted to the I liga.

== League tables ==
=== Regular season ===
Pos	Team	Pld	W	D	L	GF	GA	GD	Pts	Qualification
1	Górnik Łęczna	22	20	1	1	103	19	+84	61	Qualification to the championship group
2	Medyk Konin	22	17	1	4	92	21	+71	52	Qualification to the championship group
3	Czarni Sosnowiec	22	15	4	3	52	15	+37	49	Qualification to the championship group
4	AZS PWSZ Wałbrzych	22	12	7	3	56	26	+30	43	Qualification to the championship group
5	UKS SMS Łódź	22	10	4	8	39	28	+11	34	Qualification to the championship group
6	Olimpia Szczecin	22	7	6	9	35	59	−24	27	Qualification to the championship group
7	Mitech Żywiec	22	6	6	10	26	41	−15	24	Qualification to the relegation group
8	AZS UJ Kraków	22	5	8	9	30	46	−16	23	Qualification to the relegation group
9	AZS PSW Biała Podlaska	22	5	5	12	32	52	−20	20	Qualification to the relegation group
10	Unifreeze Górzno	22	3	4	15	18	90	−72	13	Qualification to the relegation group
11	Sportowa Czwórka Radom	22	3	4	15	16	68	−52	13	Qualification to the relegation group
12	AZS Wrocław	22	3	2	17	21	55	−34	11	Qualification to the relegation group

Updated to match(es) played on 25 April 2018. Source: 90minut.pl

=== Final tables ===
==== Championship group ====
Pos	Team	Pld	W	D	L	GF	GA	GD	Pts	Qualification
1	Górnik Łęczna	27	23	2	2	112	26	+86	71	Qualification to 2018–19 Champions League
2	Czarni Sosnowiec	27	19	5	3	60	15	+45	62	
3	Medyk Konin	27	20	1	6	102	28	+74	61	
4	AZS PWSZ Wałbrzych	27	13	9	5	64	34	+30	48	
5	UKS SMS Łódź	27	11	4	12	46	39	+7	37	
6	Olimpia Szczecin	27	7	8	12	39	72	−33	29	

Updated to match(es) played on 27 May 2018. Source: 90minut.pl

==== Relegation group ====
Pos	Team	Pld	W	D	L	GF	GA	GD	Pts	Relegation
7	Mitech Żywiec	27	8	8	11	35	48	−13	32	
8	AZS UJ Kraków	27	8	8	11	36	56	−20	32	
9	AZS PSW Biała Podlaska	27	7	5	15	44	63	−19	26	
10	AZS Wrocław	27	7	3	17	41	60	−19	24	
11	Unifreeze Górzno	27	4	5	18	27	105	−78	17	Relegation to 2018–19 I liga
12	Sportowa Czwórka Radom	27	3	6	18	21	81	−60	15	Relegation to 2018–19 I liga

Updated to match(es) played on 27 May 2018. Source: 90minut.pl

== Top goalscorers ==
Rank	Player	Club	Goals
1	(Poland) Ewelina Kamczyk	Górnik Łęczna	35
2	(Poland) Anna Gawrońska	Medyk Konin	19
3	(Poland) Emilia Zdunek	Górnik Łęczna	16
4	(Poland) Marta Cichosz	Czarni Sosnowiec	15
4	(Poland) Nikola Karczewska	UKS SMS Łódź	15
4	(Poland) Małgorzata Mesjasz	AZS PWSZ Wałbrzych	15
7	(Poland) Patrycja Balcerzak	Medyk Konin	13
7	(Poland) Ewa Cieśla	AZS PSW Biała Podlaska	13
7	(Slovakia) Patrícia Hmírová	Czarni Sosnowiec	13
7	(Poland) Dżesika Jaszek	Górnik Łęczna	13
