= Stępiński =

Stępiński (feminine: Stępińska; plural: Stępińscy) is a Polish surname. Notable persons with the surname include:

- Mariusz Stępiński (born 1995), Polish footballer
- Miłosz Stępiński (born 1974), Polish football manager
- Patryk Stępiński (born 1995), Polish footballer
