= Ewa Pajor =

Polish footballer (born 1996)

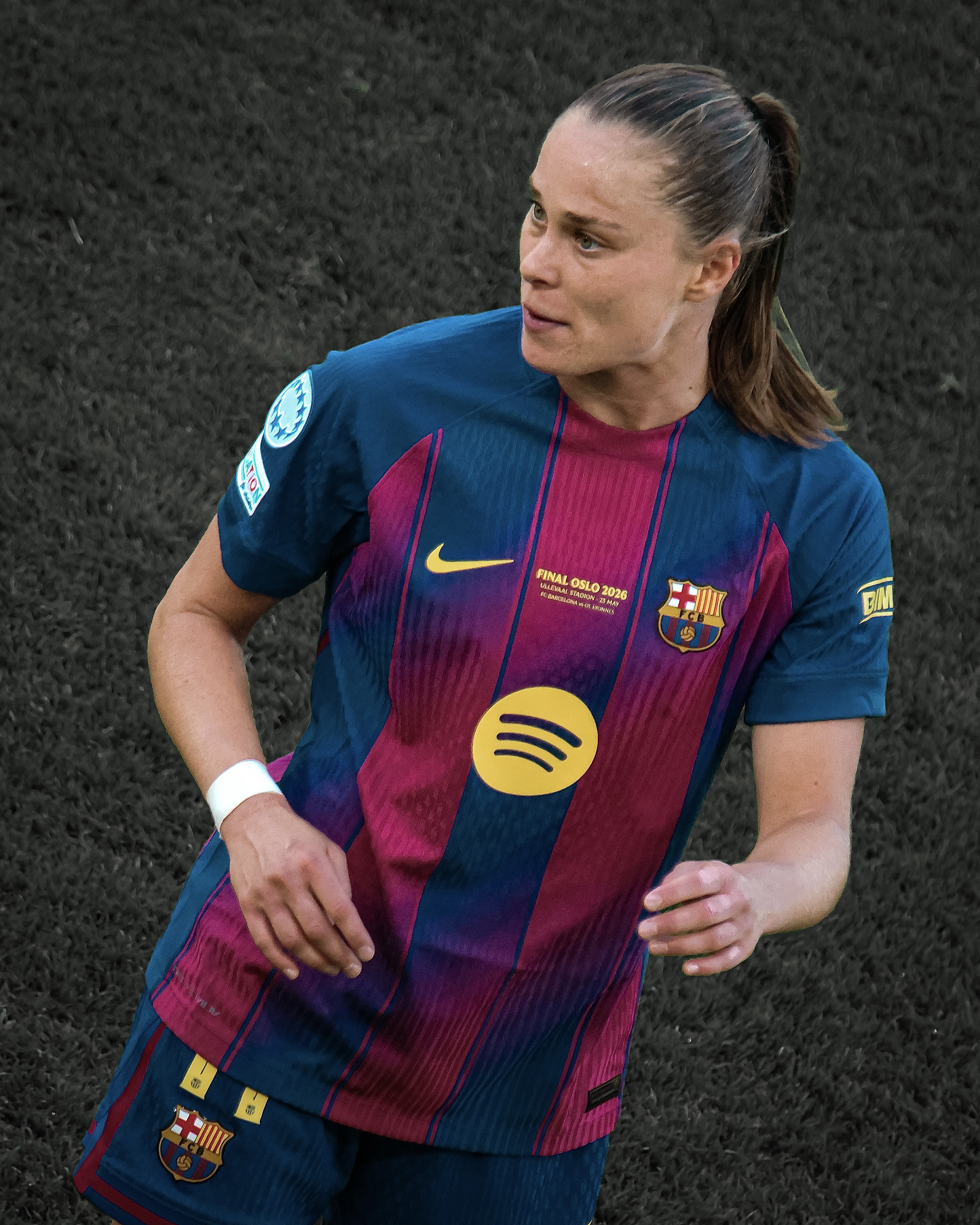
- Pajor with Barcelona in 2026

Personal information
- Full name: Ewa Barbara Pajor
- Date of birth: 3 December 1996 (age 29)
- Place of birth: Uniejów, Poland
- Height: 1.67 m (5 ft 6 in)
- Position: Striker

Team information
- Current team: Barcelona
- Number: 17

Youth career
- 2004–2009: Orlęta Wielenin
- 2009–2012: Medyk Konin

Senior career*
Years	Team	Apps	(Gls)
2012–2015	Medyk Konin	60	(64)
2015–2016	VfL Wolfsburg II	8	(3)
2015–2024	VfL Wolfsburg	121	(96)
2024–	Barcelona	57	(43)

International career^{‡}
2009–2011	Poland U15	3	(0)
2011–2013	Poland U17	18	(15)
2013–2014	Poland U19	7	(7)
2013–	Poland	112	(73)
Medal record
Representing Poland
Women's football
UEFA Women's Under-17 Championship
Winner	2013 Switzerland
- * Club domestic league appearances and goals as of 10:50, 6 October 2026 (UTC) ‡ National team caps and goals as of 22:18, 13 October 2026 (UTC)

Ewa Barbara Pajor (Polish: [ˈɛva ˈpajɔr]; born 3 December 1996) is a Polish professional footballer who plays as a striker for Liga F club Barcelona and captains the Poland national team. She is regarded as one of the best female strikers in the world.

Starting her senior career with Medyk Konin, she won two Ekstraliga titles and three national cups with Medyk in three years. In 2015, she transferred to VfL Wolfsburg, where she won five Frauen-Bundesliga titles, nine consecutive DFB-Pokals, two league top goalscorer awards, and featured in three UEFA Women's Champions League finals. In 2024, she moved to Barcelona. In her first season, she was the club's top scorer in all competitions as they won a domestic triple and finished the 2024–25 UEFA Women's Champions League as runners-up.

She was named Polish Women's Player of the Year six times by the Piłka Nożna weekly, won the Women's Gerd Müller Trophy in 2025, and placed 8th in that year's Ballon d'Or. She finished as runner-up in the following year's voting.

== Club career ==
=== Youth ===
Pajor comes from Pęgów. She started her football training at the age of 8 in Orlęty Wielenin. After graduating from primary school, she moved to Konin and trained with Medyk Konin. On 14 April 2012, she made her Ekstraliga debut, entering the game in the 55th minute of the match against AZS PWSZ Biała Podlaska, winning 3–0. On her debut, she scored two goals. The first goal was scored two minutes after entering the pitch. She became the youngest player ever to play in Ekstraliga at 15 years and 133 days old. To be able to participate in this match, a special permit was needed from PZPN, because the regulations only allowed players over 16 to play.

=== Medyk Konin ===
In the 2012–13 season, together with Medyk, she won the vice-championship and the Polish Cup. In the final match against KP Unia Racibórz, won 2–1, Pajor scored both goals for her team. The seasons 2013–14 and 2014–15 turned out to be even more successful for her. Together with Medyk Konin she won the championship and the Polish Cup twice. She played her last match for the Konin team when Medyk defeated Górnik Łęczna in the Polish Cup final 5–0. Pajor scored a hat-trick in this match. In total, for the senior team of Medyk, she scored 74 goals in all official matches, of which 64 in the Ekstraliga (in 60 appearances).

=== VfL Wolfsburg ===
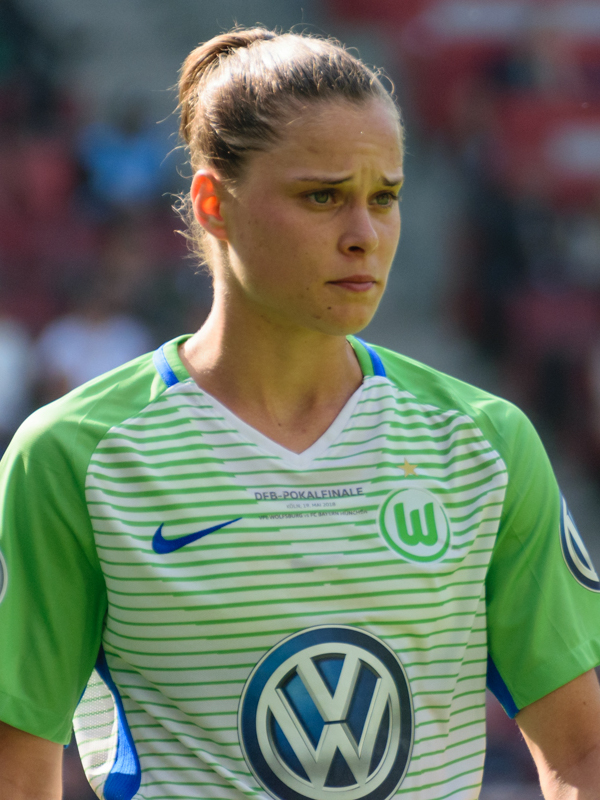
Pajor with Wolfsburg in 2018

In June 2015, Pajor signed a two-year contract with VfL Wolfsburg, which she then extended in December 2017 to be valid until 30 June 2020. On 15 November 2015, Pajor made her official debut in Wolfsburg's first squad entering the pitch in the 69th minute of the match against SGS Essen, which concluded in her side's 4–0 victory. Pajor scored her first Bundesliga goal on 16 May 2016, finding the net in the 81st minute of a home victory over 1. FC Köln and setting the final score at 5–2. On 27 October 2018, Pajor scored a hat-trick in a 7–0 victory over Bayer 04 Leverkusen. In April 2020, Pajor signed a contract extension with Wolfsburg until 2023.

In the 2018–19 season, she won the German Championship, the German Cup, and the title of Bundesliga top scorer, scoring 24 goals in 19 matches.

In the 2023–24 season, she scored four goals in the 9–1 victory against Nürnberg.

=== FC Barcelona ===
In June 2024, Pajor signed a three-year contract with FC Barcelona. On 12 December 2024, she scored a brace in a Champions League group stage match against Hammarby, which concluded in Barcelona's 3–0 victory. On 21 December 2024, she scored a hat-trick in a Copa de la Reina match contributing to Barcelona's decisive 6–2 victory over UD Tenerife.

On 11 May 2025, Pajor scored two goals in a dominant 9–0 victory over Real Betis Féminas securing her first Liga F Championship. On 18 May 2025, she registered another two goals against Athletic Bilbao contributing to Barcelona's emphatic 6–0 win. Pajor scored 25 goals and finished as the top scorer in the 2024–25 Liga F, for which she was awarded the Liga F Golden Boot. Overall, she scored 43 goals and recorded 13 assists in 45 matches for her club beating the previous record of goals scored for Barcelona in all competitions belonging to Jennifer Hermoso (41) in the 2016–2017 season. Pajor accepted the Gerd Müller Trophy for these accomplishments at the 2025 Ballon d'Or ceremony.

On 23 May 2026, she netted a brace in a 4–0 victory over Lyon in the Champions League final, helping secure her club's fourth title in the competition. She also finished as the tournament's top scorer with 11 goals.

Pajor scored 34 goals in 46 appearances for her club in the 2025–2026 season. On 27 October 2026, she finished as runner-up for the 2026 Ballon d'Or Féminin.

== International career ==
At the European Under-17 Championship held in June 2013, together with the Polish U-17 team she won the gold medal. On 9 October, she was awarded the UEFA Under-17 Golden Player Award for the best under-17 player in Europe.

She made her debut in the senior Polish national team under coach Wojciech Basiuk, in the match between Poland and the Czech Republic, as part of the Balaton Cup friendly tournament in Hungary, on 20 August 2013. Pajor checked in on the field only in the 75th minute, but in the minute after entering she won a penalty kick, scored by Patrycja Pożerska. In the 84th minute, Pajor scored.

She took part in the 4 to 11 March 2015 competition for the Istria Cup in Croatia, which she won first place with her team in the final against Slovakia.

On 6 September 2022, after scoring three goals against the Kosovo national team, Pajor became the most effective scorer in the history of the Polish national team, ahead of previous record-holder Marta Otrębska.

Pajor captained Poland at the UEFA Euro 2025, Poland's first appearance at the Euros. On 12 July, she scored her first goal at a major tournament in a 3–2 group stage win over Denmark.

== Career statistics ==
=== Club ===
As of match played 4 October 2026

Appearances and goals by club, season and competition
Club	Season	League			National cup (Note: Includes DFB-Pokal and Copa de la Reina)		UWCL		Other		Total	
Club	Season	Division	Apps	Goals	Apps	Goals	Apps	Goals	Apps	Goals	Apps	Goals
VfL Wolfsburg	2015–16	Frauen-Bundesliga	7	1	2	1	7	0	—		16	2
VfL Wolfsburg	2016–17	Frauen-Bundesliga	12	5	4	3	1	0	—		17	8
VfL Wolfsburg	2017–18	Frauen-Bundesliga	15	4	3	3	7	4	—		25	11
VfL Wolfsburg	2018–19	Frauen-Bundesliga	19	24	3	2	5	2	—		27	28
VfL Wolfsburg	2019–20	Frauen-Bundesliga	17	16	3	2	4	0	—		24	18
VfL Wolfsburg	2020–21	Frauen-Bundesliga	6	8	3	3	4	0	—		13	11
VfL Wolfsburg	2021–22	Frauen-Bundesliga	7	8	2	2	5	3	—		14	13
VfL Wolfsburg	2022–23	Frauen-Bundesliga	19	12	5	3	11	9	—		35	24
VfL Wolfsburg	2023–24	Frauen-Bundesliga	19	18	4	2	2	0	—		25	20
VfL Wolfsburg	Total		121	96	29	21	46	18	—		196	135
Barcelona	2024–25	Liga F	28	25	5	9	11	6	2 (Note: Appearances in Supercopa de España)	2	46	43
Barcelona	2025–26	Liga F	23	16	5	3	10	11	2	1	40	31
Barcelona	2026–27	Liga F	6	2	0	0	2	3	0	0	8	5
Barcelona	Total		57	43	10	12	23	20	4	3	94	79
Career total			178	139	39	33	69	38	4	3	290	214

=== International ===
As of match played 13 October 2026

Appearances and goals by national team and year
National team	Year	Apps	Goals
Poland	2013	4	2
Poland	2014	9	10
Poland	2015	11	5
Poland	2016	10	4
Poland	2017	12	7
Poland	2018	7	4
Poland	2019	6	2
Poland	2020	2	5
Poland	2021	4	6
Poland	2022	8	7
Poland	2023	10	7
Poland	2024	12	4
Poland	2025	10	5
Poland	2026	7	5
Total		112	73

Scores and results list Poland's goal tally first, score column indicates score after each Pajor goal.

List of international goals scored by Ewa Pajor
No.	Date	Venue	Opponent	Score	Result	Competition
1	20 August 2013	Balatonfüred, Hungary	Czech Republic	3–0	4–1	2013 Balaton Cup
2	22 August 2013	Balatonfüred, Hungary	Slovakia	1–1	1–1 (3–5 p)	2013 Balaton Cup
3	8 May 2014	Svangaskarð, Toftir, Faroe Islands	Faroe Islands	3–0	3–0	2015 FIFA World Cup qualification
4	18 June 2014	Bilino Polje, Zenica, Bosnia & Herzegovina	Bosnia and Herzegovina	1–1	1–1	2015 FIFA World Cup qualification
5	16 July 2014	Znicz Pruszków Stadium, Pruszków, Poland	Estonia	2–0	5–1	Friendly
6	16 July 2014	Znicz Pruszków Stadium, Pruszków, Poland	Estonia	4–0	5–1	Friendly
7	16 July 2014	Znicz Pruszków Stadium, Pruszków, Poland	Estonia	5–0	5–1	Friendly
8	13 September 2014	MotoArena Toruń, Toruń, Poland	Northern Ireland	2–0	4–0	2015 FIFA World Cup qualification
9	13 September 2014	MotoArena Toruń, Toruń, Poland	Northern Ireland	4–0	4–0	2015 FIFA World Cup qualification
10	17 September 2014	OSiR Stadium, Włocławek, Poland	Bosnia and Herzegovina	2–0	3–1	2015 FIFA World Cup qualification
11	28 October 2014	Náchod, Czech Republic	Czech Republic	1–0	1–1	Friendly
12	30 October 2014	Stadion Sportowy Bruk-Bet Termalica, Nieciecza, Poland	Slovakia	3–1	4–1	Friendly
13	11 February 2015	Lipót, Hungary	Hungary	1–0	7–2	Friendly
14	9 March 2015	Umag, Umag, Croatia	Romania	1–0	2–0	2015 Istria Cup
15	11 March 2015	Veli Jože, Poreč, Croatia	Slovakia	2–0	2–0	2015 Istria Cup
16	27 October 2015	Municipal Stadium, Jelenia Góra, Poland	Netherlands	1–0	1–0	Friendly
17	27 November 2015	CSR Orhei, Orhei, Romania	Moldova	1–0	3–1	UEFA Euro 2017 qualifying
18	4 March 2016	Paralimni Stadium, Paralimni, Cyprus	Wales	1–1	1–1	2016 Cyprus Cup
19	20 September 2016	OSiR Stadium, Włocławek, Poland	Moldova	1–0	4–0	UEFA Euro 2017 qualifying
20	26 November 2016	Łęczna Stadium, Łęczna, Poland	Belarus	3–0	4–0	Friendly
21	26 November 2016	Łęczna Stadium, Łęczna, Poland	Belarus	4–0	4–0	Friendly
22	7 April 2017	Pruszków, Poland	Finland	1–0	1–0	Friendly
23	11 April 2017	Minsk, Belarus	Belarus	3–0	4–0	Friendly
24	11 April 2017	Minsk, Belarus	Belarus	4–0	4–0	Friendly
25	8 June 2017	Stadion Yuvileinyi, Bucha, Ukraine	Ukraine	3–1	3–2	Friendly
26	15 September 2017	Łęczna Stadium, Łęczna, Poland	Belarus	3–0	4–1	2019 FIFA World Cup qualification
27	15 September 2017	Łęczna Stadium, Łęczna, Poland	Belarus	4–1	4–1	2019 FIFA World Cup qualification
28	19 September 2017	Tissot Arena, Biel/Bienne, Switzerland	Switzerland	1–2	1–2	2019 FIFA World Cup qualification
29	31 August 2018	Traktor Stadium, Minsk, Belarus	Belarus	2–0	4–1	2019 FIFA World Cup qualification
30	31 August 2018	Traktor Stadium, Minsk, Belarus	Belarus	4–1	4–1	2019 FIFA World Cup qualification
31	9 October 2018	Municipal Stadium, Ostróda, Poland	Republic of Ireland	4–0	4–0	Friendly
32	8 November 2018	Butarque Stadium, Leganés, Spain	Spain	1–1	1–3	Friendly
33	1 March 2019	Lagos Municipal Stadium, Lagos, Portugal	Spain	3–0	3–0	2019 Algarve Cup
34	5 April 2019	Arena Lublin, Lublin, Poland	Italy	1–1	1–1	Friendly
35	7 March 2020	Polonia Stadium, Warsaw, Poland	Moldova	2–0	5–1	UEFA Euro 2022 qualifying
36	7 March 2020	Polonia Stadium, Warsaw, Poland	Moldova	3–0	5–1	UEFA Euro 2022 qualifying
37	7 March 2020	Polonia Stadium, Warsaw, Poland	Moldova	5–0	5–1	UEFA Euro 2022 qualifying
38	11 March 2020	ASK Arena, Baku, Azerbaijan	Azerbaijan	1–0	5–0	UEFA Euro 2022 qualifying
39	11 March 2020	ASK Arena, Baku, Azerbaijan	Azerbaijan	4–0	5–0	UEFA Euro 2022 qualifying
40	13 April 2021	Widzew Stadium, Łódź, Poland	Sweden	1–0	2–4	Friendly
41	13 April 2021	Widzew Stadium, Łódź, Poland	Sweden	2–2	2–4	Friendly
42	11 June 2021	Pinatar Arena, San Pedro del Pinatar, Spain	Finland	2–2	2–2	Friendly
43	14 June 2021	Estadio Cartagonova, Cartagena, Spain	Czech Republic	1–0	5–0	Friendly
44	14 June 2021	Estadio Cartagonova, Cartagena, Spain	Czech Republic	2–0	5–0	Friendly
45	17 September 2021	Gdańsk Stadium, Gdańsk, Poland	Belgium	1–0	1–1	2023 FIFA World Cup qualification
46	29 June 2022	Dyskobolia Grodzisk Wielkopolski Stadium, Grodzisk Wielkopolski, Poland	Iceland	1–0	1–3	Friendly
47	1 September 2022	Elbasan Arena, Elbasan, Albania	Albania	1–1	2–1	2023 FIFA World Cup qualification
48	1 September 2022	Elbasan Arena, Elbasan, Albania	Albania	2–1	2–1	2023 FIFA World Cup qualification
49	6 September 2022	Arena Lublin, Lublin, Poland	Kosovo	3–0	7–0	2023 FIFA World Cup qualification
50	6 September 2022	Arena Lublin, Lublin, Poland	Kosovo	5–0	7–0	2023 FIFA World Cup qualification
51	6 September 2022	Arena Lublin, Lublin, Poland	Kosovo	6–0	7–0	2023 FIFA World Cup qualification
52	6 October 2022	Estadio Municipal de Chapín, Jerez de la Frontera, Spain	Morocco	1–0	4–0	Friendly
53	21 February 2023	Marbella Football Center, Marbella, Spain	Switzerland	1–0	1–1	Friendly
54	6 April 2023	Władysław Król Stadium, Łódź, Poland	Costa Rica	2–1	2–1	Friendly
55	22 September 2023	Georgios Kamaras Stadium, Athens, Greece	Greece	1–0	3–1	2023–24 UEFA Nations League
56	26 September 2023	Gdynia Stadium, Gdynia, Poland	Ukraine	1–0	2–1	2023–24 UEFA Nations League
57	26 September 2023	Gdynia Stadium, Gdynia, Poland	Ukraine	2–0	2–1	2023–24 UEFA Nations League
58	27 October 2023	Tychy Stadium, Tychy, Poland	Serbia	2–0	2–1	2023–24 UEFA Nations League
59	5 December 2023	Zagłębie Sports Park, Sosnowiec, Poland	Greece	1–0	2–0	2023–24 UEFA Nations League
60	25 October 2024	Arcul de Triumf Stadium, Bucharest, Romania	Romania	2–1	2–1	UEFA Euro 2025 qualifying play-offs
61	29 October 2024	Gdańsk Stadium, Gdańsk, Poland	Romania	1–0	4–1	UEFA Euro 2025 qualifying play-offs
62	29 October 2024	Gdańsk Stadium, Gdańsk, Poland	Romania	3–0	4–1	UEFA Euro 2025 qualifying play-offs
63	3 December 2024	Viola Park, Vienna, Austria	Austria	1–0	1–0	UEFA Euro 2025 qualifying play-offs
64	4 April 2025	Gdańsk Stadium, Gdańsk, Poland	Bosnia and Herzegovina	1–0	5–1	2025 UEFA Nations League
65	4 April 2025	Gdańsk Stadium, Gdańsk, Poland	Bosnia and Herzegovina	2–1	5–1	2025 UEFA Nations League
66	30 May 2025	Seaview, Belfast, Northern Ireland	Northern Ireland	1–0	4–0	2025 UEFA Nations League
67	30 May 2025	Seaview, Belfast, Northern Ireland	Northern Ireland	2–0	4–0	2025 UEFA Nations League
68	12 July 2025	Swissporarena, Lucerne, Switzerland	Denmark	2–0	3–2	UEFA Women's Euro 2025
69	3 March 2026	Gdańsk Stadium, Gdańsk, Poland	Netherlands	1–0	2–2	2027 FIFA Women's World Cup qualification
70	7 March 2026	Stade Gaston Gérard, Dijon, France	France	1–1	1–4	2027 FIFA Women's World Cup qualification
71	14 April 2026	Gdańsk Stadium, Gdańsk, Poland	Republic of Ireland	2–3	2–3	2027 FIFA Women's World Cup qualification
72	13 October 2026	Gdańsk Stadium, Gdańsk, Poland	Belgium	1–0	3–2 (a.e.t.) (4–3 p)	2027 FIFA Women's World Cup qualification
73	13 October 2026	Gdańsk Stadium, Gdańsk, Poland	Belgium	3–2	3–2 (a.e.t.) (4–3 p)	2027 FIFA Women's World Cup qualification

== Honours ==
Medyk Konin

- Ekstraliga: 2013–14, 2014–15
- Polish Cup: 2012–13, 2013–14, 2014–15

VfL Wolfsburg

- Bundesliga: 2016–17, 2017–18, 2018–19, 2019–20, 2021–22
- DFB-Pokal: 2015–16, 2016–17, 2017–18, 2018–19, 2019–20, 2020–21, 2021–22, 2022–23, 2023–24
- UEFA Women's Champions League runner up: 2015–16, 2017–18, 2019–20, 2022–23

Barcelona

- Liga F: 2024–25, 2025–26
- Copa de la Reina: 2024–25, 2025–26
- Supercopa de España: 2024–25, 2025–26
- UEFA Women's Champions League: 2025–26; runner-up: 2024–25

Poland

- Istria Cup: 2015

Poland U17

- UEFA Women's Under-17 Championship: 2013

Individual

- Gerd Müller Trophy: 2025
- Polish Women's Footballer of the Year: 2018, 2019, 2022, 2023, 2024, 2025
- Polish Cup top scorer: 2014–15
- Bundesliga top scorer: 2018–19, 2023–24
- Pichichi Trophy: 2024–25
- Copa de la Reina top scorer: 2024–25
- Liga F Player of the Month: April 2025, December 2025
- UEFA Women's Champions League top scorer: 2022–23, 2025–26
- UEFA Women's Champions League Team of the Season: 2017–18, 2022–23, 2025–26
- UEFA Women's Under-17 Championship Golden Player: 2013
