= 2012–13 Ekstraliga (women's football) =

The 2012–13 Ekstraliga was the 34th edition of the women's football premier league in Poland. It ran from August 18, 2012, to June 12, 2013, with a mid-season break from November to March. KU AZS UJ Kraków, and KS Gosirki Piaseczno replaced relegated teams 1.FC Katowice and MUKS Tomaszów Mazowiecki.

Unia Racibórz won its fifth title in a row but with a smaller margin than in previous seasons, two points over Medyk Konin which also was the runner-up for the fourth straight time. Górnik Łęczna also repeated their third position. Pogoń Women Szczecin, which had defeated both Unia and Medyk, was disbanded during the mid-season break for financial reasons, leaving the competition one team short. Last-placed Bronowianka KU AZS UJ Kraków was thus the only relegated team.

== Teams ==
Location of the 2012-13 Ekstraliga Kobiet teams

Voivodeship	Teams	Location	Venue
(Lublin Voivodeship) Lublin	AZS PWSZ Biała Podlaska	Biała Podlaska	Ground:MOSiR Stadium,ground
(Lublin Voivodeship) Lublin	GKS Górnik Łęczna	Łęczna	Stadion Górnika Łęczna
(Silesian Voivodeship) Silesia	TS Mitech Żywiec	Żywiec	Ground:Futrza Stadium,Ground:Radziechowy-Wieprz
(Silesian Voivodeship) Silesia	RTP Unia Racibórz	Racibórz	Stadion OSiR, Racibórz
(Kuyavian-Pomeranian Voivodeship) Kuyavia-Pomerania	KKP Bydgoszcz	Bydgoszcz	Stadion Miejski im. Eugeniusza Połtyna, Bydgoszcz
(Masovian Voivodeship) Masovia	KS Gosirki Piaseczno	Piaseczno	Stadion GOSiR, Piaseczno
(Greater Poland Voivodeship) Greater Poland	KKPK Medyk Konin	Konin	Stadion im. Złotej Jedenastki Kazimierza Górskiego, Konin
(Lesser Poland Voivodeship) Lesser Poland	KU AZS UJ Kraków	Kraków	Ground:Bro kKU-azsAZS-uUJ-Kkrakow/Ccrakow-Stadium
(West Pomeranian Voivodeship) West Pomerania	Pogoń Women Szczecin	Szczecin	Florian Krygier Stadium, Szczecin
(Lower Silesian Voivodeship) Lower Silesia	KS AZS Wrocław	Wrocław	AZS Ground

== League table ==
Pos	Team	Pld	W	D	L	GF	GA	GD	Pts	Qualification or relegation
1	RTP Unia Racibórz	18	14	2	2	58	13	+45	44	Qualified for the 2013-14 UEFA Women's Champions League
2	KKPK Medyk Konin	18	13	3	2	44	7	+37	42	
3	GKS Górnik Łęczna	18	11	2	5	33	17	+16	35	
4	KS AZS Wrocław	18	10	2	6	25	15	+10	32	
5	TS Mitech Żywiec	18	8	3	7	27	34	−7	27	
6	AZS Biała Podlaska	18	6	3	9	19	28	−9	21	
7	KKP Bydgoszcz	18	5	2	11	25	41	−16	17	
8	KS Gosirki Piaseczno	18	4	4	10	25	46	−21	16	
9	MKS Pogoń Szczecin	18	5	1	12	12	37	−25	16	Disbanded
10	KU AZS UJ Kraków	18	1	4	13	11	41	−30	7	Relegated to the 2013-14 second division (I liga)

== Results ==
Home \ Away	UNI	MED	GOR	WRO	MIT	BIA	BYD	GOS	POG	BRO
RTP Unia Racibórz		3–0	4–1	2–0	9–2	3–0	5–0	1–2	3–0 (Note: Awarded after Pogoń disbanded)	4–0
Medyk Konin	0–0		1–0	5–0	0–0	1–0	3–2	1–0	3–0	4–0
Górnik Łęczna	1–3	0–3		1–0	5–0	2–1	5–1	3–2	4–0	2–0
AZS Wrocław	0–0	1–1	0–1		3–0	3–0	1–0	2–1	0–2	3–1
Mitech Żywiec	1–3	0–4	1–0	1–0		0–0	3–0	6–2	3–0	1–1
AZS Biała Podlaska	1–3	0–4	0–1	0–1	1–0		2–2	2–4	3–0	2–0
KKP Bydgoszcz	1–4	0–7	0–3	0–2	2–3	1–2		5–0	2–1	3–0
Gosirki Piaseczno	2–4	0–5	1–1	0–5	1–3	1–1	0–3		3–0	1–1
Pogoń Szczecin	1–0	1–0	0–3	0–3	1–0	1–2	0–3	2–2		0–3
Bronowianka Kraków	1–7	0–2	0–0	0–1	2–3	1–2	0–0	1–3	0–3	

Legend: Blue = home team win; Yellow = draw; Red = away team win.

== Top scorers ==
Rank	Player	Club	Goals
1	(Equatorial Guinea) Gloria Chinasa	RTP Unia Racibórz	18
2	(Poland) Anna Gawrońska	Medyk Konin	10
3	(Poland) Ewa Pajor	Medyk Konin	9
3	(Poland) Marta Stodulska	Gosirki Piaseczno	9
3	(Poland) Patrycja Wiśniewska	RTP Unia Racibórz	9
3	(Poland) Katarzyna Wnuk	Mitech Żywiec	9
7	(Poland) Natalia Chudzik	RTP Unia Racibórz	7
7	(Poland) Anna Sznyrowska	Górnik Łęczna	7
9	(Poland) Marta Mika	RTP Unia Racibórz	6
9	(Poland) Magdalena Szaj	AZS Wrocław	6
