= Balaton Cup =

Balaton Kupa
- Founded: 2013
- Region: Hungary
- Teams: 4
- Current champions: Serbia (2nd title)
- Most championships: Slovakia (3 titles)

The Balaton Cup (Hungarian: Balaton Kupa) is an annual invitational cup competition for national women's football teams. It is held in Balatonfüred, Hungary on the shore of Lake Balaton, where it gets its name from. It is an invitational contested by 4 women's national teams from eastern Europe and it consists of 4 games: two semifinals, a third place match, and the final.

== List of finals ==
The list of finals:

Season	Champion	Result	Runner-up
2013	Slovakia	1–1 (5–3 p.)	Poland
2014	Slovakia	1–1 (5–4 p.)	Romania
2015	Slovakia	1–0	Poland
2016	Belarus	5–2	Romania
2017	Serbia	6–1	Belarus
2018	Serbia	3–0	Romania

== Participating nations ==
Team	13	14	15	16	17	18	Years
Belarus	–	–	4th	1st	2nd	3rd	4
Croatia	–	4th	–	–	–	–	1
Czech Republic	3rd	–	–	–	–	–	1
Hungary	4th	3rd	3rd	4th	3rd	4th	6
Poland	2nd	–	2nd	–	–	–	2
Romania	–	2nd	–	2nd	4th	2nd	4
Serbia	–	–	–	3rd	1st	1st	3
Slovakia	1st	1st	1st	–	–	–	3
Total	4	4	4	4	4	4	
