= Szemet =

Szemet may refer to:

- Polonized version of the Lithuanian surname Šėmeta
- Hungarian name of Kalinkovo, Slovakia
