= Jan Stępczak =

Polish footballer

Personal information
- Full name: Jan Michał Stępczak
- Date of birth: 29 August 1944 (age 82)
- Place of birth: Kazimierza Wielka, Poland
- Position: Defender

Senior career*
Years	Team	Apps	(Gls)
1957–1962	Unia Leszno		
1962–1977	Lech Poznań	287	(56)
1977–1978	Polonia New York		

Managerial career
- Lech Poznań II
- 1980–1982: Kania Gostyń
- 1982–1983: Victoria Września
- 1983–1984: Warta Poznań
- 1984–1987: Olimpia Poznań
- 1987–1988: Chrobry Głogów
- 1988: GKS Bełchatów
- 1990–1993: Victoria Września
- 1993: Lech Poznań (assistant)
- 1993–1994: Lech Poznań
- 1994–1995: Victoria Września
- 1995–1998: Dyskobolia Grodzisk Wlkp. (assistant)
- 1998–2000: Dyskobolia Grodzisk Wlkp.
- 2003–?: Atena Opela Niedbała Poznań (women)
- 2003–2009: Poland women
- 2007–2009: Victoria Września
- * Club domestic league appearances and goals

Jan Michał Stępczak (born 29 August 1944) is a Polish former footballer and manager who played as a defender.

== Honours ==
=== Player ===
Lech Poznań

- III liga: 1964–65 (Poznań), 1966–67 (Poznań), 1970–71 (North)

=== Manager ===
Olimpia Poznań

- II liga, group I: 1985–86

Dyskobolia Grodzisk Wielkopolski

- II liga West: 1996–97, 1998–99
- III liga Poznań: 1995–96
