= Śląsk Wrocław (women) =

Polish association football club

- Full name: Wrocławski Klub Sportowy Śląsk Wrocław Sekcja Piłki Nożnej Kobiet
- Nicknames: WKS; Wojskowe (The Militarians)
- Founded: 13 May 2020; 6 years ago
- Ground: GEM hotel and recreation complex, Wrocław
- Capacity: 400
- Chairman: Karolina Ostrowska
- Manager: Emilia Zdunek
- League: Ekstraliga
- 2025–26: Ekstraliga, 7th of 12
- Website: https://www.slaskwroclaw.pl/aktualnosci-pilka-kobiet
Home colours	Away colours

Śląsk Wrocław is a women's football club based in Wrocław, Poland. The women's football section of Ekstraklasa team Śląsk Wrocław, the team plays in the Ekstraliga, the top division of women's football in Poland.

== History ==
In 2020, it was announced that Śląsk Wrocław and KŚ AZS Wrocław had reached an agreement, with Śląsk taking AZS's position in the Ekstraliga, therefor bypassing the need to work up from the lowest divisions. It was announced that the ladies football team would include youth teams in the clubs academy set up, and would incorporate many of the staff members and players of the KŚ AZS Wrocław team.

== Honours ==
- Polish Cup
  - Runners-up: 2021–22, 2023–24

== Seasons ==
Season	League	Tier	Position	Matches	Points	W	D	L	GF	GA	Ref.	Polish Cup	Ref.
2020–21	Ekstraliga	I	5th of 12	22	35	11	2	9	33	40		Round of 16	
2021–22	Ekstraliga	I	7th of 12	22	30	9	3	10	33	36		Runners-up	
2022–23	Ekstraliga	I	6th of 12	22	32	10	2	10	46	38		Quarter-finals	
2023–24	Ekstraliga	I	7th of 12	22	31	9	4	9	41	36		Runners-up	
2024–25	Ekstraliga	I	5th of 12	22	38	12	2	8	48	36		Round of 16	
2025–26	Ekstraliga	I	7th of 12	22	26	8	2	12	39	33		Round of 16	

== Club statistics ==
=== League top goalscorers ===
Season	Name	Goals
2020–21	Joanna Wróblewska	10
2021–22	Karolina Iwaśko	8
2022–23	Katarzyna Białoszewska	14
2023–24	Marcelina Buś	11
2024–25	Marcelina Buś	12
2025–26	Karolina Gec	8
