= Katarzyna Białoszewska =

Polish footballer

Personal information
- Date of birth: 14 June 1994 (age 32)
- Place of birth: Poland
- Height: 1.70 m (5 ft 7 in)
- Position: Forward

Team information
- Current team: Śląsk Wrocław
- Number: 44

Senior career*
Years	Team	Apps	(Gls)
2012–2017	Naprzód Sobolów		
2017–2022	Tarnovia Tarnów	90	(70)
2022–2023	Śląsk Wrocław	22	(14)
2023	Sporting de Huelva	5	(0)
2024–	Śląsk Wrocław	27	(9)
- * Club domestic league appearances and goals as of 21:51, 2 June 2026 (UTC)

Katarzyna Białoszewska (born 14 June 1994) is a Polish professional footballer who plays as a forward for Ekstraliga club Śląsk Wrocław.

She has previously played for Spanish club Sporting de Huelva.
