= 2023–24 Ekstraliga (women's football) =

Ekstraliga
- Season: 2023–24
- Dates: 19 August 2023 – 9 June 2024
- Champions: Pogoń Szczecin
- Relegated: Medyk Konin; UJ Kraków
- Women's Champions League: Pogoń Szczecin
- Matches: 132
- Goals: 437 (3.31 per match)
- Top goalscorer: Natalia Oleszkiewicz (15 goals)

The 2023–24 Ekstraliga, also known as Orlen Ekstraliga for sponsorship reasons, was the 45th season of the top-tier women's football league in Poland. GKS Katowice is the defending champion.

== Teams ==
Locations of the 2023–24 Ekstraliga teams

| Team | Home city | Stadium | Capacity |
|---|---|---|---|
| UJ Kraków | Kraków | Stadion Miejski im. Władysława Kawuli | 1,224 |
| Czarni Sosnowiec | Sosnowiec | Stadion im. Jana Ciszewskiego | 1,000 |
| GKS Katowice | Katowice | Stadion GKS Katowice | 14,896 |
| Górnik Łęczna | Łęczna | Stadion Górnika Łęczna | 7,500 |
| AP Orlen Gdańsk | Gdańsk | Stadion Gdańskiego Ośrodka Sportu | 11,811 |
| Medyk Konin | Konin | Stadion Miejski im. Złotej Jedenastki Kazimierza Górskiego | 2,874 |
| Pogoń Szczecin | Szczecin | Boisko ul. Witkiewicza | 300 |
| Pogoń Tczew | Tczew | Stadion im. Jana Stachowiaka | 1,292 |
| Stomil Olsztyn | Olsztyn | Stadion Piłkarski OSiR | 4,517 |
| UKS SMS Łódź | Łódź | Stadion SMS im. Kazimierza Górskiego | 2,000 |
| Rekord Bielsko-Biała | Bielsko-Biała | Centrum Sportu Rekord | 600 |
| Śląsk Wrocław | Wrocław | Centrum Piłkarskie Kłokoczyce | 1,000 |

== League table ==
| Pos | Team | Pld | W | D | L | GF | GA | GD | Pts | Qualification |
|---|---|---|---|---|---|---|---|---|---|---|
| 1 | Pogoń Szczecin | 22 | 16 | 3 | 3 | 63 | 16 | +47 | 51 | Qualification for the UEFA Women's Champions League first round |
| 2 | GKS Katowice | 22 | 16 | 3 | 3 | 50 | 17 | +33 | 51 | |
| 3 | Czarni Sosnowiec | 22 | 14 | 4 | 4 | 55 | 22 | +33 | 46 | |
| 4 | UKS SMS Łódź | 22 | 13 | 5 | 4 | 47 | 19 | +28 | 44 | |
| 5 | AP Orlen Gdańsk | 22 | 11 | 2 | 9 | 30 | 29 | +1 | 35 | |
| 6 | Górnik Łęczna | 22 | 9 | 4 | 9 | 34 | 29 | +5 | 31 | |
| 7 | Śląsk Wrocław | 22 | 9 | 4 | 9 | 41 | 36 | +5 | 31 | |
| 8 | Pogoń Tczew | 22 | 6 | 4 | 12 | 29 | 65 | −36 | 22 | |
| 9 | Rekord Bielsko-Biała | 22 | 5 | 4 | 13 | 23 | 41 | −18 | 19 | |
| 10 | Stomil Olsztyn | 22 | 5 | 1 | 16 | 15 | 54 | −39 | 16 | |
| 11 | UJ Kraków | 22 | 3 | 6 | 13 | 26 | 46 | −20 | 15 | Relegation to 1. liga |
| 12 | Medyk Konin | 22 | 4 | 2 | 16 | 24 | 63 | −39 | 14 | Relegation to 1. liga |

Source: 90minut.pl

=== Results ===
| Home \ Away | SZC | KAT | SOS | ŁÓD | GDA | ŁĘC | WRO | TCZ | BIE | OLS | KRA | KON |
|---|---|---|---|---|---|---|---|---|---|---|---|---|
| Pogoń Szczecin | — | 1–0 | 0–3 | 0–0 | 1–1 | 2–1 | 1–2 | 3–0 | 4–0 | 4–0 | 6–1 | 5–0 |
| GKS Katowice | 1–0 | — | 4–1 | 2–1 | 5–1 | 2–1 | 2–1 | 5–1 | 1–0 | 3–0 | 2–0 | 2–0 |
| Czarni Sosnowiec | 2–2 | 3–0 | — | 2–2 | 2–0 | 0–0 | 2–1 | 3–0 | 4–1 | 5–1 | 2–0 | 6–1 |
| UKS SMS Łódź | 0–3 | 1–0 | 0–0 | — | 2–0 | 4–0 | 2–0 | 5–1 | 1–0 | 3–2 | 2–1 | 6–0 |
| AP Orlen Gdańsk | 1–2 | 1–5 | 2–0 | 1–0 | — | 0–0 | 0–3 | 4–1 | 3–2 | 1–0 | 0–1 | 3–0 |
| Górnik Łęczna | 0–3 | 0–4 | 3–0 | 1–1 | 1–0 | — | 5–1 | 1–2 | 0–1 | 0–1 | 2–1 | 2–0 |
| Śląsk Wrocław | 1–3 | 2–2 | 1–2 | 2–0 | 1–0 | 3–1 | — | 1–4 | 2–2 | 0–0 | 4–0 | 5–1 |
| Pogoń Tczew | 1–6 | 3–4 | 0–7 | 1–7 | 0–3 | 1–1 | 2–1 | — | 3–2 | 2–1 | 1–1 | 3–3 |
| Rekord Bielsko-Biała | 0–6 | 0–0 | 1–2 | 0–2 | 1–4 | 0–1 | 3–0 | 3–0 | — | 1–2 | 1–1 | 1–0 |
| Stomil Olsztyn | 0–4 | 0–3 | 0–7 | 0–4 | 0–1 | 0–5 | 0–3 | 2–0 | 1–2 | — | 1–0 | 1–0 |
| UJ Kraków | 1–2 | 1–1 | 1–2 | 2–2 | 2–3 | 1–4 | 2–2 | 1–1 | 3–1 | 3–2 | — | 0–1 |
| Medyk Konin | 1–5 | 0–3 | 2–0 | 2–3 | 0–1 | 2–5 | 2–5 | 1–2 | 1–1 | 3–1 | 4–3 | — |

Source: 90minut.pl
Legend: Blue = home team win; Yellow = draw; Red = away team win.

== Season statistics ==
=== Top goalscorers ===
| Rank | Player | Club | Goals |
|---|---|---|---|
| 1 | (Poland) Natalia Oleszkiewicz | Pogoń Szczecin | 15 |
| 2 | (Poland) Emilia Zdunek | Pogoń Szczecin | 13 |
| 3 | (Poland) Marcelina Buś | Śląsk Wrocław | 11 |
| 3 | (Poland) Karolina Majda | UKS SMS Łódź | 11 |
| 3 | (Poland) Klaudia Miłek | Czarni Sosnowiec | 11 |
| 3 | (Poland) Magdalena Sobal | Pogoń Tczew | 11 |
| 3 | (Poland) Anna Zapała | UJ Kraków | 11 |
| 8 | (United States) Jaylen Crim | Pogoń Szczecin | 9 |
| 8 | (Latvia) Karlīna Miksone | Czarni Sosnowiec | 9 |
| 8 | (Poland) Patrycja Ziemba | Medyk Konin | 9 |
| 11 | (Poland) Nikol Kaletka | Czarni Sosnowiec | 8 |
| 11 | (Poland) Jagoda Szewczuk | AP Orlen Gdańsk | 8 |
