= Aleksei Shemetov =

Russian footballer

Personal information
- Full name: Aleksei Vyacheslavovich Shemetov
- Date of birth: 27 April 1973 (age 53)
- Height: 1.90 m (6 ft 3 in)
- Position: Midfielder

Senior career*
Years	Team	Apps	(Gls)
1991	FC Znamya Arzamas	7	(1)
1992–1993	FC Lokomotiv Nizhny Novgorod	1	(0)
1993–1994	FC Volga Balakhna		
1995	FC Energetik Uren (amateur)		
1996–1997	FC Energetik Uren	29	(8)
1998–1999	FC Vodnik Bor		
2000	FC Motor-Energiya Gorodets		
2000–2002	FC Start Yasentsy		
2003	FC Torpedo-Viktoriya Nizhny Novgorod (amateur)		
2004–2006	FC Telma-Vodnik Nizhny Novgorod		
2007	FC Nizhny Novgorod (amateur)		
2008	FC Shakhtyor-Volga-d Peshelan		
2009	FC Shakhtyor Peshelan		
2009	FC KiT Nizhny Novgorod		
2009	FC Trud Sosnovskoye		
2010	FC Shakhtyor Peshelan		
- * Club domestic league appearances and goals

Aleksei Vyacheslavovich Shemetov (Russian: Алексей Вячеславович Шеметов; born 27 April 1973) is a former Russian football player.
