= Anna Gawrońska =

Polish footballer

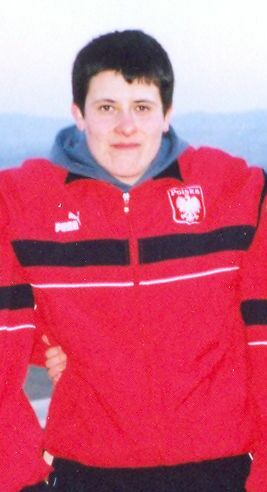
- Gawrońska in 2004

Personal information
- Full name: Anna Gawrońska
- Date of birth: 24 March 1979 (age 47)
- Place of birth: Gostyń, Poland
- Position: Striker

Team information
- Current team: Medyk Konin (player-assistant)
- Number: 9

Senior career*
Years	Team	Apps	(Gls)
2001–2002	Opel-Niedbała Warta Poznań		
2002–2004	Atena Poznań		
2004–	Medyk Konin		

International career
2002–2017	Poland	78	(11)

Managerial career
- 2011–2014: Medyk Konin (player/co-manager)
- 2014–2016: Poland U15
- * Club domestic league appearances and goals

Anna Gawrońska (born 24 March 1979) is a Polish footballer who plays as a striker for Medyk Konin. She was the Ekstraliga's top scorer in 2005–06 and 2007–08 season.

She earned 78 caps and scored 11 goals for the Poland national team from 2002 to 2017.

After retiring from an active career, she began working as a coach. In January 2011, together with Nina Patalon, she became the head coach of Medyk Konin's first team.

== Career statistics ==
=== International ===
Appearances and goals by national team and year
National team	Year	Apps	Goals
Poland	2002	1	0
Poland	2003	3	1
Poland	2004	3	0
Poland	2005	6	3
Poland	2006	4	0
Poland	2007	8	2
Poland	2008	9	1
Poland	2009	10	1
Poland	2010	6	0
Poland	2011	8	0
Poland	2012	6	0
Poland	2013	3	0
Poland	2014	6	1
Poland	2016	2	0
Poland	2017	3	2
Total		78	11

== Honours ==
Medyk Konin

- Ekstraliga: 2013–14, 2014–15, 2015–16, 2016–17
- Polish Cup: 2004–05, 2005–06, 2007–08, 2012–13, 2013–14, 2014–15, 2015–16, 2016–17, 2018–19

Individual

- Ekstraliga top scorer: 2005–06, 2007–08 2015–16
- Polish Cup top scorer: 2011–12, 2018–19
