= Sergei Shemetov =

Russian scribe and teacher

Sergei Shemetov Russian: Сергей Шеметов
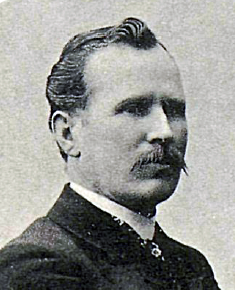
- in 1910

Deputy of the Third Imperial Duma
- In office 1 November 1907 – 9 June 1912
- Monarch: Nicholas II

Personal details
- Born: Sergei Ilyich Shemetov; 18 September 1872 Orenburg Governorate, Russian Empire
- Died: after 1930 Kurgan Oblast, USSR
- Party: Progressive Party

Sergei Ilyich Shemetov (Russian: Сергей Ильич Шеметов; 18 September 1872, Orenburg Governorate — after 1930, Kurgan Oblast) was a scribe, a teacher, a head of a village (stanytsia otaman), a deputy of the Third Imperial Duma from Orenburg Governorate between 1907 and 1912 in the Russian Empire. He founded a hotel ("paid dacha") in 1912, initiating the spa practice in the Trans-Urals region. He became a member of the "commission for the capture of the Bolsheviks" during the Russian Civil War; during the Soviet era he became a lishenets, an insurance agent and a seller.

== Literature ==
- Шеметов Сергей Ильич (in Russian) // Государственная дума Российской империи: 1906—1917 / Б. Ю. Иванов, А. А. Комзолова, И. С. Ряховская. — Москва: РОССПЭН, 2008. — P. 695. — 735 p. — ISBN 978-5-8243-1031-3.
- Шеметовъ (in Russian) // Члены Государственной Думы (портреты и биографии). Третий созыв. 1907—1912 гг. / Сост. М. М. Боиович. — Москва, 1913. — P. 211. — 526 p.
- С.И. Шеметов: Казак, атаман и депутат (in Russian) // Зауральские парламентарии в Государственной Думе Российской империи : информационный бюллетень / Курганская областная Дума. — Курган, 2016. — № 339.
