= 2020–21 Ekstraliga (women's football) =

Poland women's 1st tier association football season

Ekstraliga
- Season: 2020–21
- Dates: 8 August 2020 – 29 May 2021
- Champions: Czarni Sosnowiec
- Relegated: Rolnik Biedrzychowice; TS ROW Rybnik
- Champions League: Czarni Sosnowiec
- Matches: 132
- Goals: 488 (3.7 per match)
- Top goalscorer: Ewelina Kamczyk (27 goals)

The 2020–21 Ekstraliga was the 42nd edition of Poland's highest women's football league. Górnik Łęczna were the defending champions, since on 22 May 2021 Czarni Sosnowiec secured their 13th title ever.

== Teams ==
=== Stadiums and locations ===
City	Club	Stadium	Capacity
Bydgoszcz	KKP Bydgoszcz	Stadion Miejski im. Eugeniusza Połtyna	1000
Gdańsk	AP Lotos Gdańsk	Gdański Stadion Lekkoatletyczny i Rugby	924
Głogówek	Rolnik Biedrzychowice	Stadion Miejski	2000
Katowice	GKS Katowice	Stadion Podlesianki Katowice	1000
Konin	Medyk Konin	Stadion im. Złotej Jedenastki Kazimierza Górskiego	15 000
Kraków	AZS UJ Kraków	Stadion Miejski im. Władysława Kawuli	1224
Łęczna	Górnik Łęczna	Stadion Górnika Łęczna	7200
Łódź	UKS SMS Łódź	Stadion SMS im. Kazimierza Górskiego	2000
Rybnik	TS ROW Rybnik	Stadion Rymera Rybnik	3000
Sosnowiec	Czarni Sosnowiec	Stadion im. Jana Ciszewskiego	700
Szczecin	Olimpia Szczecin	Stadion przy ul. Witkiewicza	300
Wrocław	Śląsk Wrocław	Stadion hotelu GEM	400
