= Hanna Skalska-Szemioth =

Polish composer and journalist

Hanna Wanda Skalska-Szemioth (29 April 1921 - 10 April (or 10 May) 1964) was a Polish composer, journalist, and music educator who composed both classical and popular music, often collaborating with her husband Kazimierz Szemioth.

Skalska was born in Warsaw. She married Szemioth in 1940, then studied with Kazimierz Sikorski at the State Music College in Lodz, graduating in 1953. In the early 1950s, Skalska was a music editor with Polish Radio before teaching at the Frederic Chopin Music School until 1958. She also edited the journal Praca Swietlicowa.

Skalska's popular music was recorded commercially by singers such as Ludmila Jakubczak, Barbara Muszynska, and Natasza Zylska. Her compositions included:

== Ballet ==
- Piosenka (Song; small orchestra)

== Chamber ==
- String Quartet
- Variations on a Folk Theme (clarinet and piano)

== Orchestra ==
- Czerwona Rapsodia (Red Rhapsody; also arranged for band)

== Piano ==
- Epigrams Miniatures
- Fraszki Miniatures
- Inventions
- Variations

== Vocal ==
- “Ah, Fernando again” (text by Kazimierz Szemioth)
- “Although I know” (text by Kazimierz Szemioth)
- “Ballada o Krakowiance” (Ballad About a Krakow Girl; a cappella choir)
- “Choc Wiem Beguine” (text by Kazimierz Szemioth)
- “Kurkurydza Mambo” (text by Kazimierz Szemioth)
- ”Plamy na Suficie” (Stains on the Ceiling; text by Kazimierz Szemioth)
- “Uciekam Przed Noca” (I'm Running Away from the Night; text by Kazimierz Szemioth)
- “Wakacje z deszczem” (Holidays with Rain; text by Kazimierz Szemioth)

- Listen to “Plamy Na Suficie” (Stains on the Ceiling) by Hanna Skalska and Kazimierz Szemioth
