= Natasza Zylska =

- Born: Natasza Zygelman; 13 December 1933; Wilno, Poland (now Vilnius Lithuania)
- Died: 29 March 1995 (aged 61); Tel Aviv, Israel
- Occupation: Singer
- Years active: 1950s - 1970s

Natasza Zylska (born Natasza Zygelman; 13 December 1933 – 29 March 1995) was a Polish singer of Jewish heritage. She was one of the most popular singers in Poland in the 1950s. Her most famous song, Kasztany, is covered by Irena Santor and Edyta Górniak. Zylska also sang songs by Hanna Skalska and Kazimierz Szemioth. In 1963, Zylska emigrated to Israel.
