= Praga Warsaw =

Polish football club

Zły Praga Warsaw
- Full name: Zły Praga Warsaw
- Nickname: Złe Dziewczyny (Bad Girls)
- Founded: 2001; 25 years ago (as MUKS Praga); 21 July 2023; 2 years ago (as Zły Praga)
- Ground: DOSiR Praga-Północ
- Capacity: 1,000
- Manager: Adrian Krogul
- League: II liga North
- 2025–26: II liga North, 10th of 12
- Website: https://aks-zly.pl

Zły Praga Warszawa, known in English as Zły Praga Warsaw, is a women's football club from Warsaw, Poland. It was founded in 2001. As of the 2026–27 season, they compete in the North group of the third Polish division.

After starting in the second tier of Polish league system, the team managed promotion to the then highest league, the I liga, in 2003–04. In the following season, with the creation of the Ekstraliga as new top league, they were relegated. After three seasons in the second division, the team returned to the top tier in 2007–08 and played two seasons in the Ekstraliga before getting relegated in 2009–10. It was known as MUKS Praga Warsaw until its merger with AKS Zły's women's football department in 2023.

== Women's statistics ==
Season	League	Place	W	D	L	GF	GA	Pts	Cup
2002–03	II liga Masovia (II)	1	13	0	3	66	13	39	
2003–04	II liga Masovia (II)	1	8	0	0	50	2	24	quarter-final
2004–05	I liga (I)	8	4	2	12	19	75	14	Quarter-final
2005–06	I Liga North (II)	4	6	5	9	25	36	23	Round of 16
2006–07	I liga East (II)	2	10	4	6	28	26	34	Round of 16
2007–08	I liga North (II)	1	8	3	3	35	19	27	Quarter-final
2008–09	Ekstraliga (I)	5	4	3	13	19	89	15	
2009–10	Ekstraliga (I)	6	0	1	19	10	97	1	Quarter-final
Green marks a season followed by promotion, red a season followed by relegation.
