= Miłosz Stępiński =

Polish football manager

Personal information
- Full name: Miłosz Stępiński
- Date of birth: 1 August 1974 (age 52)
- Place of birth: Szczecin, Poland

Team information
- Current team: Poland U20 (manager)

Managerial career
- Years: Team
- 2014–2015: Zagłębie Lubin (chief analyst)
- 2015–2016: Poland U20
- 2016–2021: Poland (women)
- 2021–: Poland U20

Miłosz Stępiński (born 1 August 1974) is a Polish professional football manager, currently in charge of the Poland national under-20 team.

Between 2016 and 2021, he was the head coach of Poland's women national team. On 23 March 2021, he was announced as the head coach of the Poland men's under-20s.

He has a UEFA Pro license.

== Honours ==
Poland women's

- Algarve Cup runners-up: 2019
