= AZS PWSZ Biała Podlaska =

Polish football club

AZS PWS Biała Podlaska
- Full name: Akademicki Związek Sportowy Państwowej Wyższej Szkoły w Białej Podlaskiej
- Founded: 23 April 2003; 21 years ago
- Capacity: 1,600
- League: IV liga Lublin
- 2023–24: IV liga Lublin, 3rd of 4
Home colours	Away colours

AZS PSW Biała Podlaska is a Polish women's football club from Biała Podlaska.

The team played in the Ekstraliga, the top level women's football league of Poland, from 2006 to 2019. The best result was a 4th-place finish in 2007, 2009 and 2010.

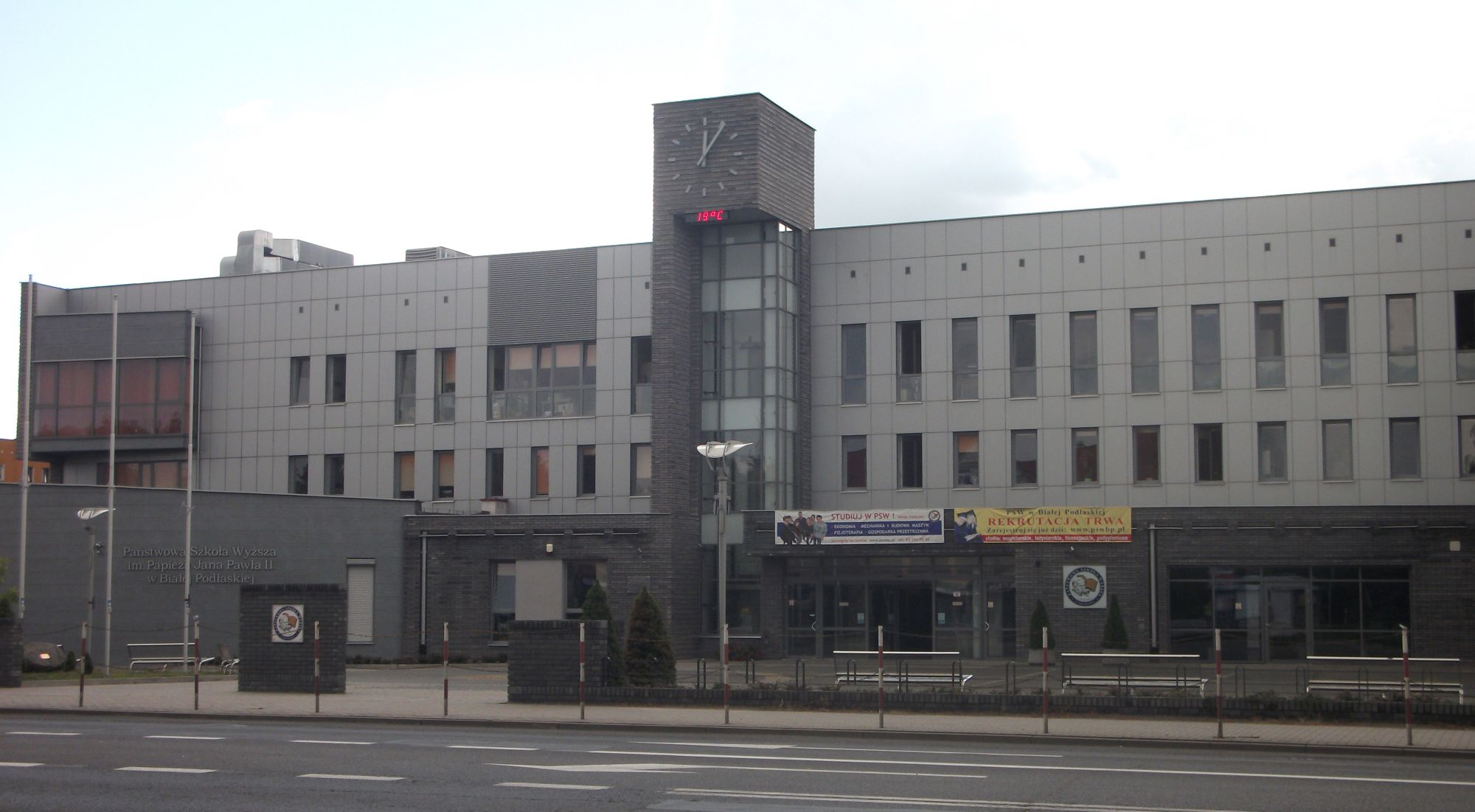
The AZS PSW women's soccer club is composed of student athletes of the Państwowa Szkoła Wyższa im. Papieża Jana Pawła II, pictured

== Statistics ==
Season	League	Place	W	D	L	GF	GA	Pts	Cup
2003–04	II liga Lublin (II)	2	9	0	3	60	14	27	
2004–05	II liga Lublin (II)	1	17	1	0	151	12	52	
2005–06	I liga South (II)	1	13	3	4	48	17	42	
2006–07	Ekstraliga (I)	4	5	3	12	20	36	18	
2007–08	Ekstraliga (I)	5	3	3	14	13	49	12	Quarter-final
2008–09	Ekstraliga (I)	4	5	5	10	16	32	20	
2009–10	Ekstraliga (I)	4	8	4	8	25	40	28	Semi-final
2010–11	Ekstraliga (I)	7	5	7	6	22	24	22	Semi-final
2011–12	Ekstraliga (I)	6	5	3	10	19	30	18	Quarter-final
2012–13	Ekstraliga (I)	6	6	3	9	19	28	21	Semi-final
2013–14	Ekstraliga (I)	8	4	2	12	12	44	14	round of 16
Green marks a season followed by promotion, red a season followed by relegation.
