= 2011–12 Ekstraliga (women's football) =

Ekstraliga
- Season: 2011–12
- Dates: 13 August 2011 – 2 June 2012
- Champions: Unia Racibórz
- Relegated: 1. FC Katowice; MUKS Tomaszów Mazowiecki
- Champions League: Unia Racibórz
- Matches: 90
- Goals: 274 (3.04 per match)
- Top goalscorer: Gloria Chinasa (20 goals)
- Biggest home win: Unia 12–0 KKP Bydgoszcz (10 September 2011)
- Biggest away win: KKP Bydgoszcz 0–8 Unia (28 April 2012)
- Highest scoring: Unia 12–0 KKP Bydgoszcz (10 September 2011)

The 2011–12 Ekstraliga season was the 33rd edition of the competition since its establishment. The Ekstraliga Kobiet (Polish for Extra League Women) is the top level women's football league of Poland.

Unia Racibórz were the defending champions, having won their third title in the previous season. MUKS Tomaszów Mazowiecki and KKP Bydgoszcz were promoted from the eastern and western group of the I liga having won their respective 2010–11 campaigns.

The campaign began on 13 August 2011. The winter break started after the 9th matchday (27-30 October). The first matches of the spring were held on 17 March. The campaign was concluded on 2 June 2012.

Each team played 18 matches. At the end of the season, the bottom two clubs were demoted to the I liga.

== League table ==
Pos	Team	Pld	W	D	L	GF	GA	GD	Pts	Qualification or relegation
1	Unia Racibórz	18	17	0	1	85	8	+77	51	Qualification to 2012–13 Champions League
2	Medyk Konin	18	15	0	3	58	13	+45	45	
3	Górnik Łęczna	18	13	2	3	41	16	+25	41	
4	Pogoń Women Szczecin	18	10	2	6	43	16	+27	32	
5	AZS Wrocław	18	8	1	9	21	26	−5	25	
6	AZS PSW Biała Podlaska	18	5	3	10	19	30	−11	18	
7	KKP Bydgoszcz	18	5	2	11	16	54	−38	17	
8	Mitech Żywiec	18	3	4	11	14	48	−34	13	
9	1. FC Katowice	18	3	4	11	10	45	−35	13	Relegation to 2012–13 I liga
10	MUKS Tomaszów Mazowiecki	18	1	2	15	10	61	−51	5	Relegation to 2012–13 I liga

Updated to match(es) played on 2 June 2012. Source: 90minut.pl

== Top goalscorers ==
Rank	Player	Club	Goals
1	(Equatorial Guinea) Gloria Chinasa Okoro	Unia Racibórz	20
2	(Poland) Anna Gawrońska	Medyk Konin/Mitech Żywiec	19
2	(Poland) Anna Żelazko	Unia Racibórz	19
4	(Poland) Anna Sznyrowska	Górnik Łęczna	17
5	(Romania) Zsuzsanna Sinka	Pogoń Women Szczecin	15
5	(Poland) Agata Tarczyńska	Unia Racibórz	15
7	(Poland) Aleksandra Sikora	Medyk Konin	10
8	(Azerbaijan) Anna Ələkbərova	Górnik Łęczna	8
8	(Poland) Anna Ciupińska	AZS PSW Biała Podlaska	8
8	(Latvia) Jūlija Sokolova	Górnik Łęczna	8
