= KKPK Medyk Konin =

Polish football club

- Full name: Koniński Klub Piłkarstwa Kobiecego Medyk Konin
- Nickname: Pielęgniarki (The Nurses)
- Founded: 23 March 1985; 41 years ago
- Ground: Stadion im. Złotej Jedenastki Kazimierza Górskiego w Koninie
- Capacity: 15,000
- Chairman: Roman Jaszczak
- Manager: vacant
- League: I liga
- 2025–26: I liga, 4th of 12
- Website: medykkonin.pl
Home colours	Away colours	Third colours

KKPK Medyk Konin is a Polish women's football club from Konin. As of the 2026–27 season, they compete in the I liga, the second level of competition, following relegation from the 2023–24 Ekstraliga.

Medyk Konin was founded in 1985. Since its promotion to the top league, the team has always finished near the top. They finished runners-up in 2002–03, 2003–04, 2005–06 and 2007–08 campaigns. In the 2007–08 season, the team only drew the penultimate game against KŚ AZS Wrocław, but in so doing lost a chance at their first title. The same fate happened again in the 2010–11 season, when they lost on the last matchday to Unia Racibórz, whom they would have overtaken for the title with a win. In the 2013–14 season, they secured their first league title.

In total, Medyk have won four Ekstraliga titles, and the Polish Cup on nine occasions.

== Honours ==
- Ekstraliga
  - Champions: 2013–14, 2014–15, 2015–16, 2016–17
  - Runners-up: 2002–03, 2003–04, 2005–06, 2007–08, 2009–10, 2010–11, 2011–12, 2012–13, 2018–19, 2019–20
- Polish Cup
  - Winners: 2004–05, 2005–06, 2007–08, 2012–13, 2013–14, 2014–15, 2015–16, 2016–17, 2018–19
  - Runners-up: 2002–03, 2003–04, 2006–07, 2011–12

== Current squad ==
As of 11 February 2024.

Note: Flags indicate national team as defined under FIFA eligibility rules; some limited exceptions apply. Players may hold more than one non-FIFA nationality.

No.	Pos.	Nation	Player
2	MF	POL	Julia Chudy
4	DF	POL	Zuzanna Kogutek
5	DF	POL	Gabriela Mikucka
6	MF	POL	Monika Mierzejewska
7	FW	POL	Patrycja Ziemba
7	FW	BLR	Hanna Skryhanava
8	MF	POL	Nina Budzińska
8	MF	POL	Monika Poniedzialek
11	DF	POL	Klaudia Urna
12	FW	POL	Aleksandra Bieryło
14	MF	POL	Oliwia Jaśniak
16	DF	NGA	Omowumi Stella Oshobukola
17	DF	CAN	Samantha Savoy

No.	Pos.	Nation	Player
18	FW	POL	Patrycja Sikora
20	DF	POL	Maja Majchrzak
20	MF	POL	Julia Ustarbowska
21	MF	POL	Liwia Lizik
22	GK	POL	Oliwia Śmiechowicz
23	DF	POL	Natasza Krupa
24	MF	SRB	Milica Andrić
25	FW	CAN	Venessa Mazur
25	FW	POL	Paulina Włodarek
33	GK	POL	Julia Woźniak
37	FW	POL	Marta Wrona
77	GK	POL	Amelia Kopp
77	GK	POL	Viktoria Ćwik

=== Former internationals ===
For details of current and former players, see Category:KKPK Medyk Konin players.

- Poland: Dagmara Grad, Agata Guściora, Ewelina Kamczyk, Klaudia Olejniczak, Ewa Pajor, Natalia Pakulska, Agata Tarczyńska
- Belarus: Anastasiya Kharlanova, Anastasia Shuppo
- Bulgaria: Liliana Kostova, Radoslava Slavcheva
- Croatia: Helenna Hercigonja-Moulton, Sandra Žigić
- Lithuania: Gabija Gedgaudaitė
- Montenegro: Jelena Sturanović
- Romania: Maria Ficzay
- Serbia: Nikoleta Nikolić
- Slovakia: Stanislava Lišková
- Ukraine: Anastasia Sverdlova, Iryna Vasylyuk

== UEFA competitions ==
Konin played in the 2014–15 Champions League qualifying and advanced to the round of 32 after the second matchday.

Season	Competition	Stage	Result	Opponent
2014–15	Champions League	Qualifying round	3–0	(Bosnia and Herzegovina) SFK 2000
2014–15	Champions League	Qualifying round	7–0	(Finland) Åland United
2014–15	Champions League	Qualifying round	11–1	(North Macedonia) ŽFK Kochani
2014–15	Champions League	Round of 32	2–0, 0–3 (a.e.t.)	(Scotland) Glasgow City F.C.
2015–16	Champions League	Qualifying round	5–0	(Wales) Cardiff Met.
2015–16	Champions League	Qualifying round	6–0	(Republic of Ireland) Wexford Youths
2015–16	Champions League	Qualifying round	4–0	(Lithuania) Gintra Universitetas
2015–16	Champions League	Round of 32	0–6 (H), 0–3 (A)	(France) Lyon
2016–17	Champions League	Qualifying round	3–1	(Romania) CFF Olimpia Cluj
2016–17	Champions League	Qualifying round	1–0	(Estonia) Pärnu JK
2016–17	Champions League	Qualifying round	9–0	(Montenegro) ŽFK Breznica
2016–17	Champions League	Round of 32	4–3 (H), 2–3 (A)	(Italy) ACF Brescia
