= TS Mitech Żywiec =

Polish football club

- Full name: Towarzystwo Sportowe Mitech Żywiec
- Founded: March 2003; 23 years ago
- Chairman: Jan Szupina
- Manager: Agnieszka Spandel
- League: III liga, group III
- 2025–26: III liga, group III, 6th of 12
- Website: tsmitech.pl
Home colours	Away colours

TS Mitech Żywiec is a women's football club from Żywiec, Poland. They currently compete in the third group of the III liga, the fourth level of competition.

The team started in March 2003 as the women's section of the club Soła Żywiec and played its first season in the II liga, the then second highest league in Poland. After the first season, the team became independent as TS Mitech Żywiec on 3 July 2004. From 2009 until 2020, Mitech played in the highest league, the Ekstraliga. In its first season, the team finished 5th.

== Current squad ==
Note: Flags indicate national team as defined under FIFA eligibility rules; some limited exceptions apply. Players may hold more than one non-FIFA nationality.

No.	Pos.	Nation	Player
1	GK	POL	Aleksandra Komosa
14	GK	POL	Katarzyna Hudecka
20	GK	POL	Kinga Szemik
2	DF	POL	Anna Zegan
3	DF	SVK	Helena Mikulíková
4	DF	POL	Karolina Wiśniewska
5	DF	POL	Karolina Zasada
15	DF	POL	Anna Żak
18	DF	POL	Magdalena Chrzanowska

No.	Pos.	Nation	Player
6	MF	POL	Halina Półtorak
7	MF	POL	Katarzyna Wnuk
8	MF	POL	Weronika Żak
9	MF	POL	Krystyna Kuśnierz
17	MF	POL	Marzena Cholewka
19	MF	POL	Patrycja Rżany
12	MF	POL	Agata Droździk
10	FW	SVK	Dominika Sýkorová
11	FW	POL	Karolina Wieczorek

== Women's statistics ==
Season	League	Place	W	D	L	GF	GA	Pts	Cup
2003–04	II Liga kobiet, grupa: śląska (II)	5	4	1	7	36	45	13	
2004–05	II Liga kobiet, grupa: śląska (II)	3	8	0	6	70	20	24	
2005–06	II Liga kobiet, grupa: śląska (II)	1	16	0	0	39	2	48	Round of 16
2006–07	II liga kobiet, grupa: lubelska (III)	1	16	1	1	87	14	49	
2007–08	I liga kobiet, grupa: południowa (II)	2	8	4	2	46	15	28	
2008–09	I liga kobiet, grupa: wschodnia (II)	1	10	3	1	49	7	33	
2009–10	Ekstraliga Kobiet (I)	5	6	1	13	21	44	19	Round of 16
2010–11	Ekstraliga Kobiet (I)	8	4	1	13	18	53	13	quarter-final
2011–12	Ekstraliga Kobiet (I)	8	3	4	11	14	48	13	Round of 16
2012–13	Ekstraliga Kobiet (I)	5	8	3	7	27	34	27	quarter-final
2013–14	Ekstraliga Kobiet (I)	4	9	3	6	35	35	30	quarter-final
Green marks a season followed by promotion, red a season followed by relegation.
