= Poland women's national football team =

Women's national association football team representing Poland

Poland
- Nickname(s): Biało-czerwone (The white and reds); Orlice (The Eaglesses)
- Association: Polish Football Association (Polski Związek Piłki Nożnej)
- Confederation: UEFA (Europe)
- Head coach: Nina Patalon
- Captain: Ewa Pajor
- Most caps: Ewelina Kamczyk (114)
- Top scorer: Ewa Pajor (73)
- Home stadium: Polsat Plus Arena Gdańsk
- FIFA code: POL
First colours	Second colours

FIFA ranking
- Current: 29 (20 October 2026)
- Highest: 24 (December 2025)
- Lowest: 36 (June 2018)

First international
- Italy 3–0 Poland (Catania, Italy; 27 June 1981)

Biggest win
- Israel 0–13 Poland (Ramat Gan, Israel; 25 February 1998)

Biggest defeat
- Iceland 10–0 Poland (Reykjavík, Iceland; 13 September 2003)

World Cup
- Appearances: 0

European Championship
- Appearances: 1 (first in 2025)
- Best result: Group stage (2025)

The Poland women's national football team (Polish: Reprezentacja Polski w piłce nożnej kobiet) represents Poland in international women's football, and is governed by the Polish Football Association, the governing body for football in Poland.

Having played their inaugural game in 1981, the team have attempted to qualify for each major tournament from UEFA Women's Euro 1991 onwards. They have clinched their first successful qualification for a major tournament, the UEFA Women's Euro 2025, after two wins over Austria in the second round of the qualifying play-offs.

== History ==
Poland was one of the earliest nations in Europe to begin developing women's football, having fielded its female team for the first time in 1981, for a friendly against Italy away. Poland's debut ended with a 0–3 defeat in Catania.

Since its inception, Poland has had little success at the international stage, and failed to qualify for any major tournament until 2025, although the team had come close on several occasions before that. This had been largely due to most of its female footballers not being professional, playing on part-time or amateur basis, unlike the far more successful men's counterparts. Despite their part-time status, the fact that the team has seen its rise in fortune since 2010s, having come very close in qualifying for UEFA Women's Euro 2013, 2022, as well as the 2011, 2015 and 2023 FIFA Women's World Cups were seen as signs of potential growth of the women's team.

Since late 2010s, more efforts have been put in order to give the women's national team more recognition. After failing to qualify for the UEFA Women's Euro 2022, the PZPN has undertaken the step to bid for the UEFA Women's Euro 2025, with the establishment of a separate women's football department, while the domestic women's league of Poland, Ekstraliga, is also moving toward establishing full-time professionalism in undisclosed dates.

In 2024, Poland failed to score a point during their UEFA Euro 2025 qualifying run. However, thanks to winning their 2023–24 UEFA Nations League group, they were ensured of a play-off spot that would grant them a second chance to qualify for the tournament. After winning both play-off legs against Romania in October, and their first game against Austria the following month, Poland sealed their first-ever qualification to a major event on 3 December 2024, with a 1–0 win (2–0 on agg.) against the Austrians. At the UEFA Euro 2025, Poland lost 0–2 against Germany and 0–3 against Sweden, and defeated Denmark 3–2 in the final game of the group stage, thus achieving a historic victory and their first goals and points at a major tournament.

== Team image ==
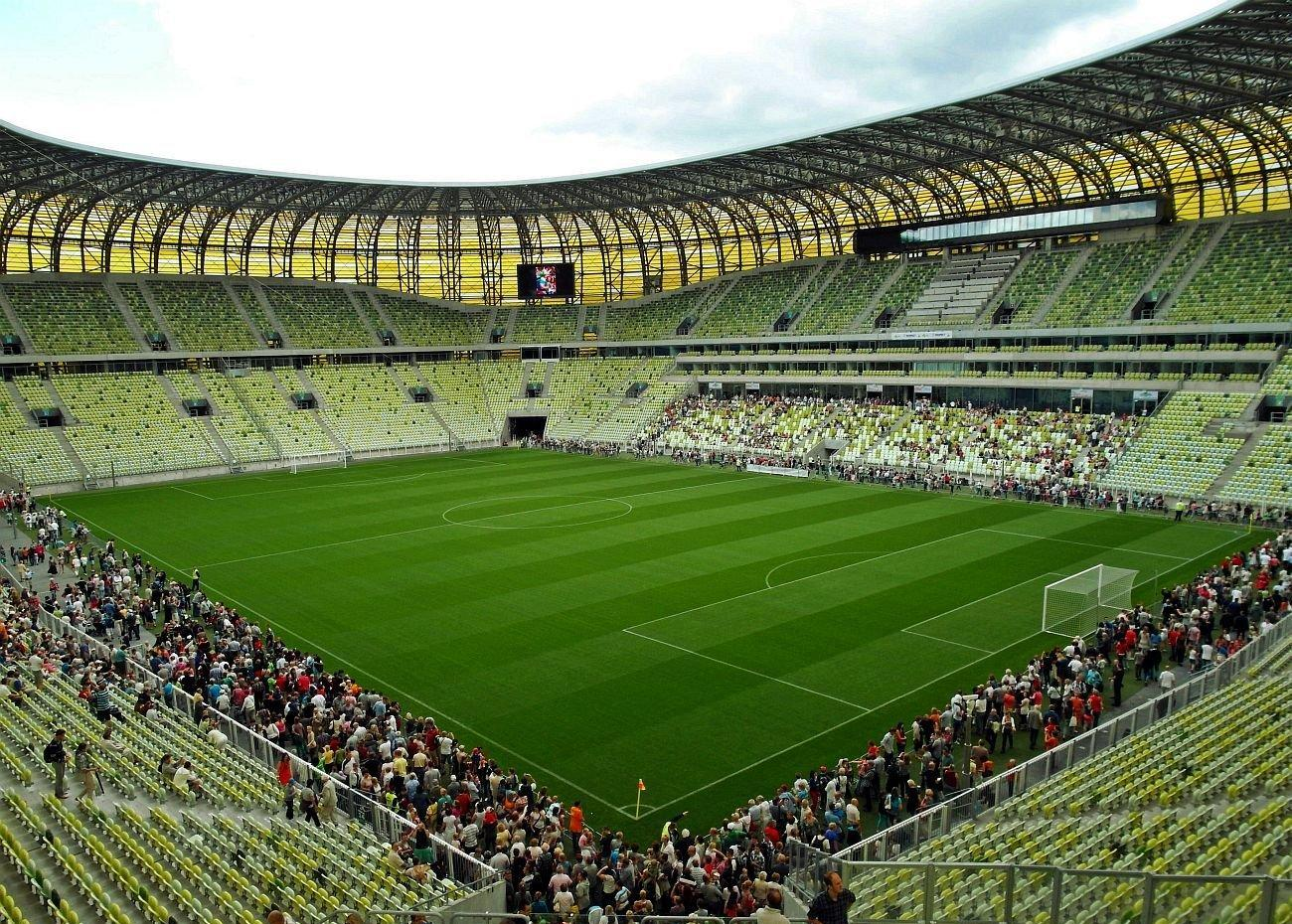
Polsat Plus Arena Gdańsk, Poland's home stadium since 2024.

=== Nicknames ===
The Poland women's national football team has been known or nicknamed as Biało-czerwone (transl. The white and reds) or Orlice (transl. The Eaglesses).

=== Home stadium ===
Until 2024, the Poland women's national football team had no national stadium. On 30 August that year, it was announced that Polsat Plus Arena Gdańsk would serve as the team's home venue for the next three years.

The then-record attendance of 8,449 spectators was recorded during the first game played at Polsat Plus Arena Gdańsk in its new role, a 4–1 UEFA Euro 2025 qualifying play-off win over Romania on 29 October 2024.

== Results and fixtures ==
The following is a list of match results in the last 12 months, as well as any future matches that have been scheduled.

Legend

Win Draw Loss Fixture

=== 2025 ===
28 November Friendly	Poland	1–0	Slovenia	Gdańsk, Poland
17:45	Zawistowska 17'	Report		Stadium: Polsat Plus Arena Gdańsk; Referee: Jana Adámková (Czech Republic)

2 December Friendly	Poland	3–0	Latvia	Gdańsk, Poland
13:30	Sarapata 13'; Tomasiak 45'; Sobal 90'	Report		Stadium: Gdańsk Sports Center Stadium; Referee: Michalina Diakow (Poland)

=== 2026 ===
3 March 2027 FIFA Women's World Cup qualification	Poland	2–2	Netherlands	Gdańsk, Poland
18:00	Pajor 24'; Tomasiak 84'	Report (FIFA); Report (UEFA)	Buurman 44'; Roord 47'	Stadium: Gdańsk Stadium; Attendance: 3,540; Referee: Ivana Projkovska (North Macedonia)

7 March 2027 FIFA Women's World Cup qualification	France	4–1	Poland	Dijon, France
21:10	Katoto 20', 40'; Karchaoui 59' (pen.); Diani 71'	Report (FIFA); Report (UEFA)	Pajor 29'	Stadium: Stade Gaston Gérard; Attendance: 15,459; Referee: Alina Peşu (Romania)

14 April 2027 FIFA Women's World Cup qualification	Poland	2–3	Republic of Ireland	Gdańsk, Poland
18:00	Pawollek 43'; Pajor 78'	Report (FIFA); Report (UEFA)	Murphy 12'; McCabe 20'; Sheva 59'	Stadium: Gdańsk Stadium; Attendance: 4,270; Referee: Hristiyana Guteva (Bulgaria)

18 April 2027 FIFA Women's World Cup qualification	Republic of Ireland	1–0	Poland	Dublin, Ireland
16:00	Sheva 42'	Report (FIFA); Report (UEFA)		Stadium: Aviva Stadium; Attendance: 18,267; Referee: Aleksandra Česen (Slovenia)

5 June 2027 FIFA Women's World Cup qualification	Poland	0–2	France	Gdańsk, Poland
18:00		Report (FIFA); Report (UEFA)	Malard 47'; Baltimore 63'	Stadium: Gdańsk Stadium; Attendance: 11,713; Referee: Kirsty Dowle (England)

9 June 2027 FIFA Women's World Cup qualification	Netherlands	3–1	Poland	Almelo, Netherlands
21:00	Kaptein 24'; Leuchter 61'; Rijsbergen 81'	Report (FIFA); Report (UEFA)	Kamczyk 83' (pen.)	Stadium: Asito Stadion; Attendance: 8,021; Referee: Fabienne Michel (Germany)

9 October 2027 FIFA Women's World Cup qualification	Belgium	1–0	Poland	Leuven, Belgium
20:15	Dhont 45+3'	Report (FIFA); Report (UEFA)		Stadium: Den Dreef; Attendance: 6,238; Referee: Emanuela Rusta (Albania

13 October 2027 FIFA Women's World Cup qualification	Poland	3–2 (a.e.t.) (4–3 p)	Belgium	Gdańsk, Poland
18:00	Pajor 42', 116'; Tomasiak 67'	Report (FIFA); Report (UEFA)	Littel 51'; Teulings 105'	Stadium: Gdańsk Stadium; Attendance: 7,740; Referee: Ivana Martinčić (Croatia)
	Penalties
	Dudek (penalty scored); Pajor (penalty missed); Kamczyk (penalty scored); Achcińska (penalty scored); Padila (penalty scored)		(penalty scored) Wullaert; (penalty missed) Teulings; (penalty missed) Vanzeir; (penalty scored) Littel; (penalty scored) Cayman

1 December 2027 FIFA Women's World Cup qualification	Poland	v	Republic of Ireland	Gdańsk, Poland
18:00		Report (FIFA); Report (UEFA)		Stadium: Gdańsk Stadium

5 December 2027 FIFA Women's World Cup qualification	Republic of Ireland	v	Poland	Dublin, Ireland
18:00		Report (FIFA); Report (UEFA)		Stadium: Aviva Stadium

== Coaching staff ==
=== Current coaching staff ===
As of 15 October 2026

Position	Name
Head coach	Nina Patalon
Assistant coach	Ryszard Robakiewicz
Head match analyst	Marta Walczak
Match analyst	Jędrzej Wichłacz
Goalkeeping coach	Łukasz Maćkowiak
Physical coordinator	Remigiusz Rzepka
Physical coach	Małgorzata Rak
Team doctor	Adam Zaręba
Head physiotherapist	Bartłomiej Gąsior
Physiotherapists	Anna Modrzejewska; Patryk Polaczek; Maria Warowny
Dietician	Urszula Somow
Cook	Tomasz Leśniak
Psychologist	Rafał Malinowski
Team managers	Antoni Kordos; Olga Maroszek
Kitmen	Bartosz Krajewski

=== Manager history ===
Manager	From	To	Source
Tadeusz Maślak & Roman Bieszke	27 June 1981	27 June 1981	
Jerzy Pach	July 1984	December 1985	
Józef Kopeć	1986	1989	
Józef Drabicki	1990	1990	
Jerzy Miedziński	1991	1991	
Władysław Szyngiera	January 1992	December 1998	
Leszek Baczyński	January 1999	December 1999	
Albin Wira	February 2000	18 September 2003	
Jan Stępczak	18 September 2003	10 June 2009	
Robert Góralczyk	17 June 2009	13 December 2010	
Roman Jaszczak	11 January 2011	21 February 2013	
Wojciech Basiuk	21 February 2013	7 June 2016	
Miłosz Stępiński	7 June 2016	15 March 2021	
Nina Patalon	19 March 2021	Present	

== Players ==
=== Current squad ===
The following players were called up for the 2027 FIFA Women's World Cup qualification matches against the Republic of Ireland on 1 and 5 December 2026.

Caps and goals correct as of 13 October 2026, after the match against Belgium.

No.	Pos.	Player	Date of birth (age)	Caps	Goals	Club
	GK	Kinga Seweryn	31 March 2005 (age 21)	5	0	(French Football Federation) Paris FC
	GK	Natalia Radkiewicz	8 August 2003 (age 23)	3	0	(French Football Federation) Nantes
	GK	Julia Woźniak	15 April 2007 (age 19)	0	0	(Portuguese Football Federation) Sporting CP
	DF	Martyna Wiankowska	24 December 1996 (age 29)	104	12	(Italian Football Federation) Como 1907
	DF	Paulina Dudek (vice-captain)	16 June 1997 (age 29)	68	7	(French Football Federation) Paris Saint-Germain
	DF	Sylwia Matysik	20 May 1997 (age 29)	67	0	(German Football Association) Hamburger SV
	DF	Oliwia Woś	15 August 1999 (age 27)	36	0	(The Football Association) Bristol City
	DF	Wiktoria Zieniewicz	9 May 2002 (age 24)	36	0	(German Football Association) Werder Bremen
	DF	Aleksandra Zaremba	19 February 2001 (age 25)	11	0	(Royal Spanish Football Federation) UD Tenerife
	DF	Katja Skupień	24 August 2004 (age 22)	1	0	(Italian Football Federation) Sassuolo
	DF	Magda Piekarska	9 September 2007 (age 19)	0	0	(Italian Football Federation) Roma
	MF	Ewelina Kamczyk	22 February 1996 (age 30)	114	18	(Italian Football Federation) AC Milan
	MF	Adriana Achcińska	22 April 2002 (age 24)	56	7	(German Football Association) VfB Stuttgart
	MF	Tanja Pawollek	18 January 1999 (age 27)	33	2	(German Football Association) Union Berlin
	MF	Milena Kokosz	16 August 2001 (age 25)	20	2	(Norwegian Football Federation) Rosenborg
	MF	Patrycja Sarapata	26 November 2004 (age 21)	9	1	(Polish Football Association) Czarni Sosnowiec
	MF	Zuzanna Witek	19 September 2007 (age 19)	0	0	(Danish Football Association) HB Køge
	FW	Ewa Pajor (captain)	3 December 1996 (age 29)	112	73	(Royal Spanish Football Federation) Barcelona
	FW	Natalia Padilla	6 November 2002 (age 24)	53	13	(Royal Spanish Football Federation) UD Tenerife
	FW	Weronika Zawistowska	17 December 1999 (age 26)	53	10	(German Football Association) 1. FC Köln
	FW	Paulina Tomasiak	2 January 2002 (age 24)	21	8	(German Football Association) Bayer Leverkusen
	FW	Nadia Krezyman	22 June 2004 (age 22)	20	3	(The Football Association) Brighton & Hove Albion
	FW	Klaudia Maciążka	1 March 2003 (age 23)	5	0	(Polish Football Association) GKS Katowice

=== Recent call-ups ===
The following players have also been called up to the squad within the past 12 months.

Pos.	Player	Date of birth (age)	Caps	Goals	Club	Latest call-up
GK	Kinga Szemik	25 June 1997 (age 29)	38	0	(Germany) Hamburger SV	v. Belgium, 9 October 2026 ^{INJ}
GK	Oliwia Szperkowska	27 August 2001 (age 25)	1	0	(France) Paris Saint-Germain	v. Republic of Ireland, 18 April 2026
DF	Julia Walentowicz	23 April 2001 (age 25)	1	0	(Sweden) KIF Örebro	v. Belgium, 13 October 2026
DF	Jagoda Cyraniak	23 May 2006 (age 20)	4	0	(France) Marseille	v. Belgium, 9 October 2026 ^{INJ}
DF	Emilia Szymczak	17 June 2006 (age 20)	19	0	(Spain) Barcelona	v. France, 7 March 2026
DF	Weronika Szymaszek	17 July 1998 (age 28)	2	0	(Italy) Parma	v. Republic of Ireland, 18 April 2026
DF	Katarzyna Nowak	17 December 2003 (age 22)	1	0	(Poland) GKS Katowice	v. Republic of Ireland, 18 April 2026
MF	Gabriela Grzybowska	21 November 2002 (age 23)	11	0	(France) Nantes	v. Belgium, 13 October 2026
MF	Natalia Wróbel	9 August 2003 (age 23)	20	2	(France) RC Strasbourg	v. Netherlands, 9 June 2026
MF	Weronika Araśniewicz	15 March 2008 (age 18)	3	0	(Germany) VfL Wolfsburg	v. Netherlands, 9 June 2026
MF	Dominika Grabowska	26 December 1998 (age 27)	91	9	(Poland) Legia Warsaw	v. Latvia, 2 December 2025
MF	Oliwia Domin	2 January 2004 (age 22)	5	0	(Turkey) Galatasaray	v. Latvia, 2 December 2025
MF	Weronika Kaczor	30 May 2003 (age 23)	3	0	(Poland) Górnik Łęczna	v. Latvia, 2 December 2025
MF	Dominika Misztal	17 December 2004 (age 21)	1	0	(Poland) Stomilanki Olsztyn	v. Latvia, 2 December 2025
FW	Magdalena Sobal	28 September 2004 (age 22)	3	1	(Switzerland) Servette	v. Belgium, 13 October 2026
FW	Klaudia Jedlińska	9 February 2000 (age 26)	17	2	(France) Paris FC	v. Republic of Ireland, 18 April 2026
FW	Zuzanna Grzywińska	23 June 2006 (age 20)	1	0	(Germany) 1. FC Nürnberg	v. Latvia, 2 December 2025
Notes: ^{INJ} = Withdrew due to injury

== Player records ==
As of 9 October 2026

Players in bold are still active with the national team.

=== Most appearances ===
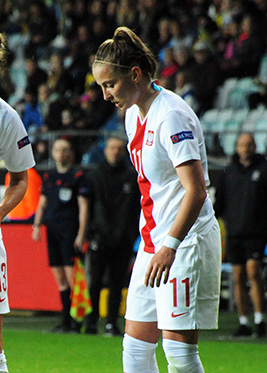
Ewelina Kamczyk is Poland's most capped player with 114 appearances.

Rank	Player	Career	Caps	Goals
1	**Ewelina Kamczyk**	2014–present	114	18
2	**Ewa Pajor**	2013–present	112	73
3	Maria Makowska	1988–2010	111	5
4	Agnieszka Winczo	2004–2020	109	37
5	**Martyna Wiankowska**	2015–present	104	12
6	Marta Otrębska	1988–2007	101	48
7	**Dominika Grabowska**	2014–present	91	9
8	Agnieszka Szondermajer	1991–2005	90	33
9	Jolanta Siwińska	2009–2021	88	2
10	Natalia Chudzik	2008–2021	87	7

=== Top goalscorers ===
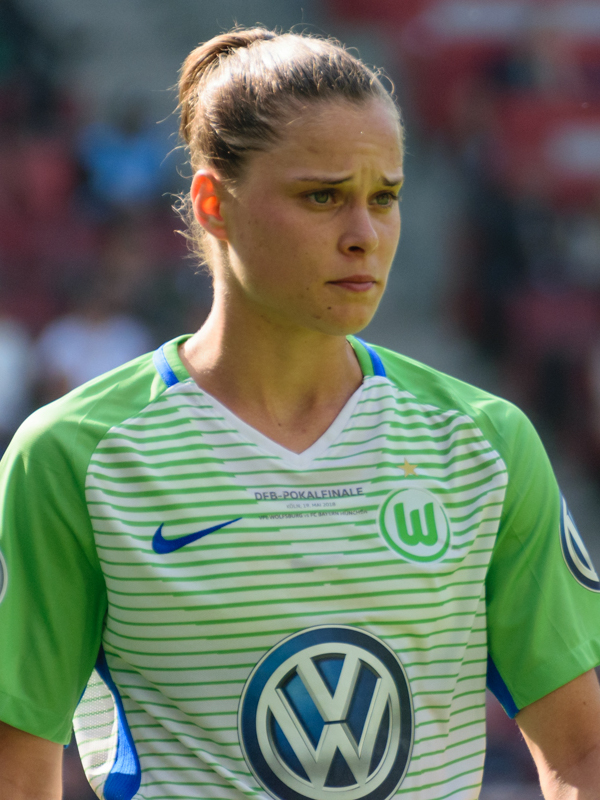
Ewa Pajor is Poland's top goalscorer with 73 goals.

Rank	Player	Career	Goals	Caps	Avg.
1	**Ewa Pajor**	2013–present	73	112	0.65
2	Marta Otrębska	1988–2007	48	101	0.48
3	Agnieszka Winczo	2004–2020	37	109	0.34
4	Agnieszka Szondermajer	1991–2005	33	90	0.37
5	Anna Żelazko	2001–2013	27	79	0.34
6	Patrycja Pożerska	2001–2016	23	84	0.27
7	**Ewelina Kamczyk**	2014–present	18	114	0.16
8	Jolanta Nieczypor	1990–1999	17	36	0.47
9	Agnieszka Leonowicz	1993–2004	16	64	0.25
10	Patrycja Balcerzak	2011–2021	15	78	0.19

== Competitive record ==
=== FIFA Women's World Cup ===
FIFA Women's World Cup record								Qualification record					
Year	Result	Pld	W	D *	L	GF	GA	Pld	W	D	L	GF	GA
(China) 1991	Did not qualify							4	0	0	4	2	11
(Sweden) 1995	Did not qualify							6	0	1	5	2	15
(United States) 1999	Did not qualify							8	5	1	2	15	9
(United States) 2003	Did not qualify							8	8	0	0	25	1
(China) 2007	Did not qualify							8	3	0	5	14	29
(Germany) 2011	Did not qualify							8	5	1	2	18	9
(Canada) 2015	Did not qualify							10	5	1	4	20	14
(France) 2019	Did not qualify							8	3	2	3	16	12
(Australia) (New Zealand) 2023	Did not qualify							10	6	2	2	28	9
(Brazil) 2027	To be determined												
(Costa Rica) (Jamaica) (Mexico) (United States) 2031	To be determined							To be determined					
(United Kingdom) 2035	To be determined							To be determined					
Total	0/10	—	—	—	—	—	—	70	35	12	25	149	98

*Draws include knockout matches decided on penalty kicks.

=== Olympic Games ===
Summer Olympics record
Year	Result	GP	W	D	L	GF	GA
(United States) 1996	Did not qualify						
(Australia) 2000	Did not qualify						
(Greece) 2004	Did not qualify						
(China) 2008	Did not qualify						
(United Kingdom) 2012	Did not qualify						
(Brazil) 2016	Did not qualify						
(Japan) 2020	Did not qualify						
(France) 2024	Did not qualify						
(United States) 2028	To be determined						
(Australia) 2032	To be determined						
Total	-	-	-	-	-	-	-

=== UEFA Women's Championship ===
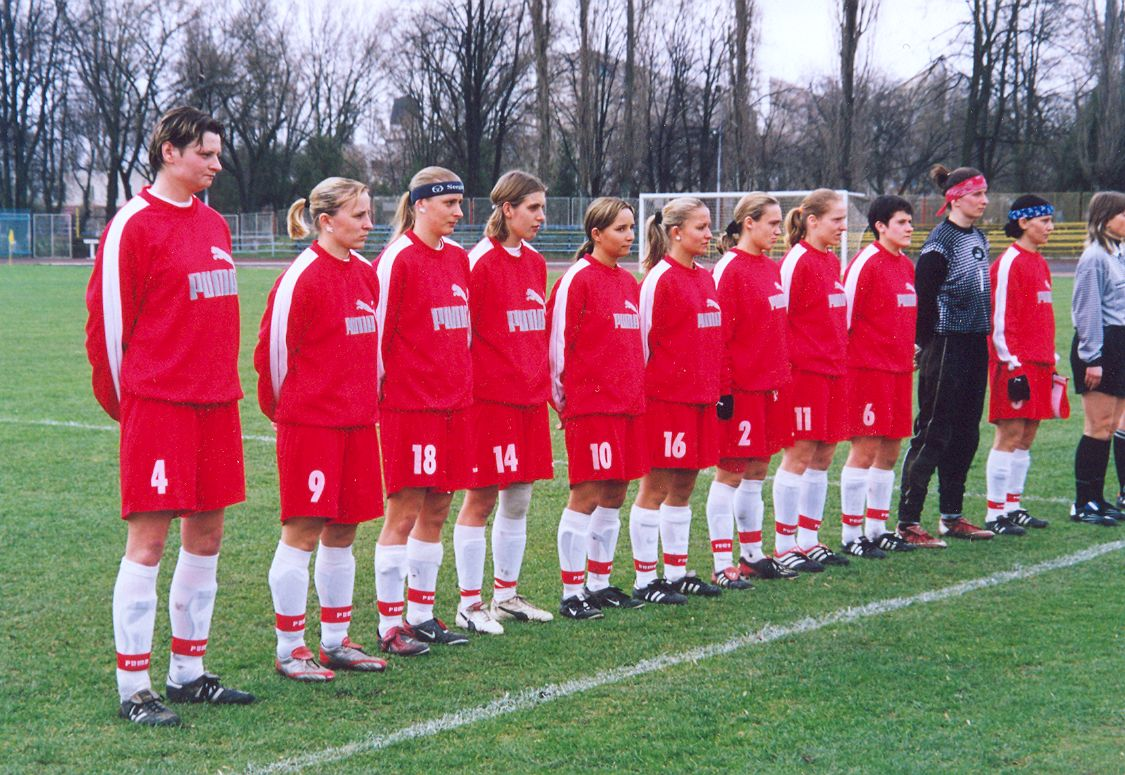
Poland's national team in 2004

UEFA Women's Euro record									Qualification record							
Year	Result	Pos	Pld	W	D *	L	GF	GA	Pld	W	D	L	GF	GA	P/R	Rnk
1984	Did not enter								Did not enter							
(Norway) 1987	Did not enter								Did not enter							
(West Germany) 1989	Did not enter								Did not enter							
(Denmark) 1991	Did not qualify								4	0	0	4	2	11	—	
(Italy) 1993	Did not qualify								4	0	0	4	3	12	—	
(Germany) 1995	Did not qualify								6	0	1	5	2	15	—	
(Norway) (Sweden) 1997	Did not qualify								6	3	0	3	22	9	—	
(Germany) 2001	Did not qualify								6	3	2	1	16	11	—	
(England) 2005	Did not qualify								8	0	2	6	7	36	—	
(Finland) 2009	Did not qualify								8	2	1	5	11	20	—	
(Sweden) 2013	Did not qualify								10	5	2	3	17	11	—	
(Netherlands) 2017	Did not qualify								8	3	1	4	10	16	—	
(England) 2022	Did not qualify								8	4	2	2	16	5	—	
(Switzerland) 2025	Group stage	12th	3	1	0	2	3	7	10	4	0	6	12	19	▼ (Note: From Euro 2025 onwards a new qualifying format was introduced, linked to the Women's Nations League where teams are divided into leagues with promotion/relegation between the leagues at the end of each cycle.)	16th
(Germany) 2029	To be determined															
Total	Group stage	1/14	3	1	0	2	3	7	74	24	11	39	116	154	16th	

=== UEFA Women's Nations League ===
UEFA Women's Nations League record
Season	Division	Group	Pos	Pld	W	D	L	GF	GA	P/R	RK
2023–24	B	3	1st	6	5	1	0	11	4	▲	19th
2025	B	1	1st	6	5	1	0	16	2	▲	17th
Total				12	10	2	0	27	6	19th	

▲	Promoted at end of season
Same position	No movement at end of season
▼	Relegated at end of season
*	Participated in promotion/relegation play-offs

=== Algarve Cup ===
Year	Result	Pld	W	D	L	GF	GA	Coach
2008	11th place	4	1	0	3	3	8	Jan Stępczak
2009	11th place	3	1	1	2	5	9	Jan Stępczak
2019	Runners-up	3	2	0	1	4	3	Miłosz Stępiński
Total	Runners-up	10	4	1	6	12	20	–

== See also ==
- Sport in Poland
  - Football in Poland
    - Women's football in Poland
- Poland women's national under-20 football team
- Poland women's national under-19 football team
- Poland women's national under-17 football team
- Poland men's national football team
