= RTP Unia Racibórz =

Polish football club

- Full name: Raciborskie Towarzystwo Pilkarskie Unia Racibórz
- Founded: 1945; 81 years ago (sports club); 2001; 25 years ago (women's football)
- Dissolved: 2013; 13 years ago
- Ground: OSiR Stadium, Racibórz
- Capacity: 10,000
- 2013–14: Ekstraliga, 10th of 10 (withdrew mid-season)
- Website: rtpunia.raciborz.com.pl
Home colours	Away colours

RTP Unia Racibórz was a women's football club from Racibórz, Poland. The club won five national championships, three Polish Cups and participated in the UEFA Women's Champions League.

== History ==
=== As part of a sports club ===
Unia Racibórz was founded on 27 April 1946 as a men's team. Its initial name was Klub Sportowy Plania Racibórz. The club has undergone several name changes. From June 1949 to November 1949 it was named ZKS Chemik Racibórz, then it was called ZKS Unia Racibórz (until 18 March 1957), and KS Unia Racibórz up to the 1997–98 season before adopting the current name RTP Unia Racibórz. Until 2001, the year the women started training, the club had only a men's football team. The women's team was registered for league play in the 2002–03 season.

In January 2008, after discrepancies over the use of finances, the men's section split from RTP Unia and took the name KP Unia Racibórz. Thus RTP Unia Racibórz became exclusively a women's football club.

=== As an independent club ===
In 2006-07 the club gained promotion into Ekstraliga, Poland's first league for women. In their first season in the Ekstraliga the took 3rd place, but only one year later the team won the championship and ended the dominance of KS AZS Wrocław, who had won the title the last eight times. Unia was able to defend the title in 2009–10.

In the 2009-10 Champions League, they started in the round of 32 but lost to SV Neulengbach. Later that season Unia won their first national cup after beating Pogoń Women Szczecin7-1 in the final. The following season, Unia again lost the round of 32 champions league legs, this time to Brøndby. In 2012–13, Unia lost to VfL Wolfsburg and was eliminated by Konak Belediyespor a year later, at the round of 32 stage yet again.

After the 2012/13 season the main sponsor left and many players left for new clubs. Several of those were Polish national team players. Unia eventually withdrew from the Extraleague after the first half of the 2013/14 season because of financial problems. They stood at second place that time of being withdrawn. The club was disbanded and thus did not join lower-tier competitions.

== Honours ==
- Ekstraliga
  - Champions: 2008–09, 2009–10, 2010–11, 2011–12, 2012–13
- I liga
  - Champions: 2004–05 (Opole group)
- Polish Cup
  - Winners: 2009–10, 2010–11, 2011–12
- Poland indoor championships
  - Champions: 2008, 2009, 2011

== Seasons ==
Season	League	Place	W	D	L	GF	GA	Pts	Cup
2002–03	II liga Silesia II	5th	6	2	12	22	31	20	
2003–04	II liga Opole	2nd	7	1	2	42	18	22	
2004–05	II liga Opole	1st	17	1	2	96	16	52	Round of 16
2005–06	I liga South	2nd	12	3	5	69	34	39	Semi-finals
2006–07	I liga West	1st	20	0	0	116	6	60	Quarter-finalists
2007–08	Ekstraliga	3rd	10	4	6	33	28	34	Runners-up
2008–09	Ekstraliga	1st	17	2	1	78	11	53	Semi-finalists
2009–10	Ekstraliga	1st	17	1	2	84	12	52	Winners
2010–11	Ekstraliga	1st	15	2	1	82	7	47	Winners
2011–12	Ekstraliga	1st	17	0	1	85	8	51	Winners
2012–13	Ekstraliga	1st	14	2	2	58	13	44	Runners-up
2013–14	Ekstraliga	10th (Note: Unia withdrew from competition after round 9.)	7	1	10	5	37	32	Quarter-finalists
Green marks a season followed by promotion, red a season followed by relegation.

== UEFA competitions record ==
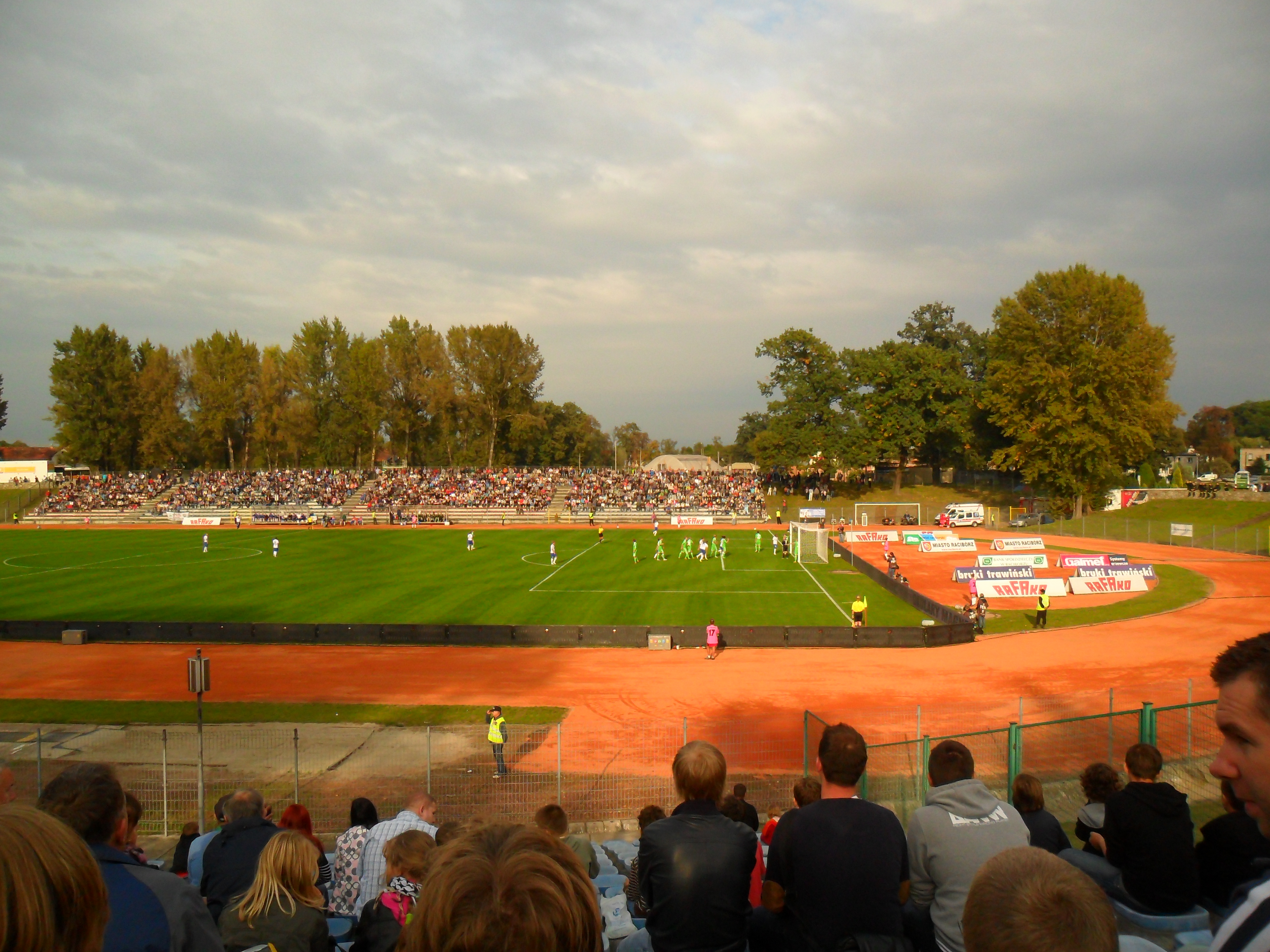
Unia Racibórz – Wolfsburg (1–5)

Season	Competition	Stage	Result	Opponent
2009–10	Champions League	Round of 32	1–3 1-0	(Austria) Neulengbach
2010–11	Champions League	Round of 32	1–2 1-0	(Denmark) Brøndby
2011–12	Champions League	Qualifying Stage	0–1	(Slovakia) Slovan Bratislava
			8–0	(Albania) Ada Velipojë
			1–1	(Finland) PK-35
2012–13	Champions League	Qualifying Stage	5–0	(Slovakia) Slovan Bratislava
			7–1	(Montenegro) ŽFK Ekonomist
			5–0	(Belarus) Bobruichanka Bobruisk
		Round of 32	1–5 1-6	(Germany) VfL Wolfsburg
2013–14	Champions League	Qualifying Stage	3–1	(Slovenia) Pomurje
			7–0	(Albania) Ada Velipojë
			0–0	(Belarus) Bobruichanka Bobruisk
		Round of 32	1–2 0–0	(Turkey) Konak Belediyespor

== Former internationals ==
- (Croatia) Leonarda Balog
- (Croatia) Iva Landeka
