= 2023–24 UEFA Women's Nations League A =

Tournament details
- Dates: League phase: 22 September – 5 December 2023; Nations League Finals: 21–28 February 2024
- Teams: 16
- Relegated: Portugal; Scotland; Switzerland; Wales

Tournament statistics
- Matches played: 48
- Goals scored: 142 (2.96 per match)
- Attendance: 539,136 (11,232 per match)
- Top scorer: (Netherlands) Lineth Beerensteyn (6 goals)
- Women's European Qualifiers Women's Nations League

The 2023–24 UEFA Women's Nations League A was the top division of the 2023–24 edition of the UEFA Women's Nations League, the inaugural season of the international football competition involving the women's national teams of the member associations of UEFA. League A culminated with the Nations League Finals in February 2024 to determine the champions of the competition, and which two teams (in addition to hosts France) would qualify for the 2024 Summer Olympics. The results were also used to determine the leagues for the UEFA Women's Euro 2025 qualifying competition.

== Format ==
League A consisted of the 16 top-ranked UEFA members in the UEFA women's national team coefficient ranking, split into four groups of four. Each team played six matches within their group, using the home-and-away round-robin format with double matchdays in September, October, and November to December 2023. The winners of each group advanced to the 2024 UEFA Women's Nations League Finals. The competition also acted as the first phase of the preliminary competition for UEFA Women's Euro 2025, which uses an identical league structure. The fourth-placed team from each group were relegated to League B, taking effect in UEFA Women's Euro 2025 qualifying. In addition, the third-placed teams of League A advanced to the relegation play-offs against the runners-up of League B. The winners of the home-and-away ties entered League A for UEFA Women's Euro 2025 qualifying, while the losers entered League B.

The Nations League Finals took place in February 2024 and were played in a knockout format, consisting of single-leg semi-finals, a third-place play-off, and a final. An open draw determined the pairings and home teams for the semi-final matches and which semi-final would have its teams host the third-place play-off and final. The two best-ranked teams in the Nations League Finals (excluding France) qualified for the 2024 Olympic football tournament, while the winners of the final was crowned as the champions of the UEFA Women's Nations League. England, Scotland, and Wales are not members of the IOC, thus are ineligible to participate in the Olympics, but the results of the England team, by agreement of the Home Nations and FIFA were taken to represent Great Britain's qualification bid for that tournament. As England did not reach the Nations League Finals, Great Britain would not be represented at the 2024 Summer Olympics.

== Seeding ==
Teams were allocated to League A according to their UEFA women's national team coefficient after the conclusion of the 2023 FIFA Women's World Cup qualifying group stage on 6 September 2022. Teams were split into four pots of four teams, ordered based on their UEFA national team coefficient.

The draw for the league phase took place at the UEFA headquarters in Nyon, Switzerland on 2 May 2023, 13:00 CEST. Each group contained one team from each pot. The draw started with Pot 1 and ended with Pot 4, with drawn teams assigned to the first available group in ascending order from A1 to A4. Due to winter venue restrictions, a group could contain a maximum of two of Sweden, Norway and Iceland.

Pot 1
Team	Coeff	Rank
England	46,178	1
Germany	43,043	2
France	42,584	3
Sweden	40,823	4

Pot 2
Team	Coeff	Rank
Spain	40,472	5
Netherlands	39,910	6
Norway	38,715	7
Denmark	37,535	8

Pot 3
Team	Coeff	Rank
Italy	36,455	9
Belgium	34,794	10
Austria	33,963	11
Iceland	33,348	12

Pot 4
Team	Coeff	Rank
Switzerland	33,101	13
Wales	29,942	15
Portugal	29,744	16
Scotland	29,335	17

== Groups ==
Times are CET/CEST, (Note: CEST (UTC+2) for times up to 28 October 2023, CET (UTC+1) for times from 29 October 2023.) as listed by UEFA (local times, if different, are in parentheses).

=== Group 1 ===
Pos	Team	Pld	W	D	L	GF	GA	GD	Pts	Qualification or relegation	(Netherlands)	(England)	(Belgium)	(Scotland)
1	Netherlands	6	4	0	2	14	6	+8	12 (Note: Tied on head-to-head results. Ranked on overall goal difference: Netherlands +8, England +7)	Qualification for Nations League Finals	—	2–1	4–0	4–0
2	England	6	4	0	2	15	8	+7	12		3–2	—	1–0	2–1
3	Belgium (O)	6	2	2	2	7	10	−3	8	Qualification for relegation play-offs	2–1	3–2	—	1–1
4	Scotland (R)	6	0	2	4	3	15	−12	2	Relegation to League B	0–1	0–6	1–1	—

Source: UEFA
Rules for classification: Tiebreakers
(O) Play-off winners; (R) Relegated
Notes:
22 September 2023
20:30

Belgium	2–1	Netherlands
Detruyer 61'; Blom 90+3'	Report	Roord 60'

Den Dreef, Leuven
Attendance: 3,694
Referee: Frida Klarlund (Denmark)
22 September 2023
20:45 (19:45 BST)

England	2–1	Scotland
Bronze 39'; Hemp 45'	Report	Hanson 45+2'

Stadium of Light, Sunderland
Attendance: 41,947
Referee: Maria Sole Ferrieri Caputi (Italy)

26 September 2023
20:00

Netherlands	2–1	England
Martens 34'; Jansen 90'	Report	Russo 64'

Stadion Galgenwaard, Utrecht
Attendance: 24,000
Referee: Ivana Martinčić (Croatia)
26 September 2023
20:45 (19:45 BST)

Scotland	1–1	Belgium
Howard 90+3'	Report	Missipo 52'

Hampden Park, Glasgow
Attendance: 7,058
Referee: Eleni Antoniou (Greece)

27 October 2023
20:45 (19:45 BST)

England	1–0	Belgium
Hemp 13'	Report

King Power Stadium, Leicester
Attendance: 28,321
Referee: Lina Lehtovaara (Finland)
27 October 2023
20:45

Netherlands	4–0	Scotland
Van de Donk 12'; Brugts 32'; Beerensteyn 52', 71'	Report

Goffertstadion, Nijmegen
Attendance: 10,850
Referee: Ivana Projkovska (North Macedonia)

31 October 2023
20:30

Belgium	3–2	England
De Neve 9'; Wullaert 45+6', 85' (pen.)	Report	Bronze 38'; Kirby 44'

Den Dreef, Leuven
Attendance: 7,235
Referee: Esther Staubli (Switzerland)
31 October 2023
20:45 (19:45 GMT)

Scotland	0–1	Netherlands
	Report	Brugts 60'

Hampden Park, Glasgow
Attendance: 5,186
Referee: Jana Adámková (Czech Republic)

1 December 2023
20:30

Belgium	1–1	Scotland
Detruyer 31'	Report	Cuthbert 34'

Den Dreef, Leuven
Attendance: 4,730
Referee: Olatz Rivera Olmedo (Spain)
1 December 2023
20:45 (19:45 GMT)

England	3–2	Netherlands
Stanway 59'; Hemp 61'; Toone 90+1'	Report	Beerensteyn 12', 35'

Wembley Stadium, London
Attendance: 71,632
Referee: Tess Olofsson (Sweden)

5 December 2023
20:45

Netherlands	4–0	Belgium
Beerensteyn 34', 54'; Egurrola 90+1', 90+5'	Report

Koning Willem II Stadion, Tilburg
Attendance: 12,031
Referee: Stéphanie Frappart (France)
5 December 2023
20:45 (19:45 GMT)

Scotland	0–6	England
	Report	Greenwood 13'; James 38', 39'; Mead 45+1'; Kirby 49'; Bronze 90+3'

Hampden Park, Glasgow
Attendance: 15,320
Referee: Alina Peşu (Romania)

=== Group 2 ===
Pos	Team	Pld	W	D	L	GF	GA	GD	Pts	Qualification or relegation	(France)	(Austria)	(Norway)	(Portugal)
1	France	6	5	1	0	9	1	+8	16	Qualification for Nations League Finals	—	3–0	0–0	2–0
2	Austria	6	3	1	2	7	8	−1	10		0–1	—	2–1	2–1
3	Norway (O)	6	1	2	3	9	8	+1	5	Qualification for relegation play-offs	1–2	1–1	—	4–0
4	Portugal (R)	6	1	0	5	5	13	−8	3	Relegation to League B	0–1	1–2	3–2	—

Source: UEFA
Rules for classification: Tiebreakers
(O) Play-off winners; (R) Relegated
22 September 2023
19:00

Norway	1–1	Austria
Sævik 26'	Report	Campbell 72'

Ullevaal Stadion, Oslo
Attendance: 7,011
Referee: Iuliana Demetrescu (Romania)
22 September 2023
21:10

France	2–0	Portugal
Geyoro 27'; Bacha 89'	Report

Stade du Hainaut, Valenciennes
Attendance: 18,377
Referee: Tess Olofsson (Sweden)

26 September 2023
18:30

Austria	0–1	France
	Report	Renard 5'

Franz Horr Stadium, Vienna
Attendance: 10,051
Referee: Jelena Cvetković (Serbia)
26 September 2023
19:15 (18:15 WEST)

Portugal	3–2	Norway
Jacinto 38'; Costa 44' (pen.), 69' (pen.)	Report	Maanum 32'; Terland 58'

Estádio Cidade de Barcelos, Barcelos
Attendance: 6,132
Referee: Ewa Augustyn (Poland)

27 October 2023
18:00

Austria	2–1	Portugal
Amado 63' (o.g.); Dunst 69'	Report	T. Pinto 90+6'

Stadion Schnabelholz, Altach
Attendance: 4,800
Referee: Maria Sole Ferrieri Caputi (Italy)
27 October 2023
19:00

Norway	1–2	France
Bratberg Lund 60'	Report	Mjelde 23' (o.g.); Renard 69'

Ullevaal Stadion, Oslo
Attendance: 9,062
Referee: Rebecca Welch (England)

31 October 2023
19:15 (18:15 WET)

Portugal	1–2	Austria
Capeta 75'	Report	Pinther 72'; Campbell 77'

Estádio do Varzim SC, Póvoa de Varzim
Attendance: 3,598
Referee: Frida Klarlund (Denmark)
31 October 2023
21:00

France	0–0	Norway
	Report

Stade Auguste-Delaune, Reims
Attendance: 13,121
Referee: Kateryna Monzul (Ukraine)

1 December 2023
19:00

Norway	4–0	Portugal
Hegerberg 3', 8' (pen.), 49'; Román Haug 90+4'	Report

Ullevaal Stadion, Oslo
Attendance: 2,383
Referee: Ivana Martinčić (Croatia)
1 December 2023
21:10

France	3–0	Austria
Henry 5'; Le Sommer 57'; Katoto 84'	Report

Roazhon Park, Rennes
Attendance: 26,453
Referee: Ewa Augustyn (Poland)

5 December 2023
19:15

Austria	2–1	Norway
Campbell 10'; Schiechtl 89'	Report	Sævik 90+4'

NV Arena, Sankt Pölten
Attendance: 1,300
Referee: Marta Huerta de Aza (Spain)
5 December 2023
19:15 (18:15 WET)

Portugal	0–1	France
	Report	Geyoro 90+4'

Estádio Dr. Magalhães Pessoa, Leiria
Attendance: 5,337
Referee: Ivana Projkovska (North Macedonia)

=== Group 3 ===
Pos	Team	Pld	W	D	L	GF	GA	GD	Pts	Qualification or relegation	(Germany)	(Denmark)	(Iceland)	(Wales)
1	Germany	6	4	1	1	14	3	+11	13	Qualification for Nations League Finals	—	3–0	4–0	5–1
2	Denmark	6	4	0	2	10	6	+4	12		2–0	—	0–1	2–1
3	Iceland (O)	6	3	0	3	4	8	−4	9	Qualification for relegation play-offs	0–2	0–1	—	1–0
4	Wales (R)	6	0	1	5	4	15	−11	1	Relegation to League B	0–0	1–5	1–2	—

Source: UEFA
Rules for classification: Tiebreakers
(O) Play-off winners; (R) Relegated
22 September 2023
18:00

Denmark	2–0	Germany
Vangsgaard 23', 64'	Report

Viborg Stadium, Viborg
Attendance: 4,210
Referee: Marta Huerta de Aza (Spain)
22 September 2023
20:00 (18:00 WET)

Iceland	1–0	Wales
Viggósdóttir 18'	Report

Laugardalsvöllur, Reykjavík
Attendance: 2,014
Referee: Katalin Kulcsár (Hungary)

26 September 2023
18:15

Germany	4–0	Iceland
Bühl 19', 78'; Gwinn 35' (pen.); Schüller 68'	Report

Ruhrstadion, Bochum
Attendance: 14,998
Referee: Alina Peşu (Romania)
26 September 2023
20:15 (19:15 BST)

Wales	1–5	Denmark
Fishlock 51'	Report	Harder 6' (pen.), 11', 90+1'; Thøgersen 60'; S. Troelsgaard 87'

Cardiff City Stadium, Cardiff
Attendance: 8,607
Referee: Stéphanie Frappart (France)

27 October 2023
17:45

Germany	5–1	Wales
Schüller 25', 47'; Gwinn 80' (pen.); Roberts 86' (o.g.); Anyomi 88'	Report	Holland 42'

Rhein-Neckar-Arena, Sinsheim
Attendance: 20,107
Referee: Monika Mularczyk (Poland)
27 October 2023
20:30 (18:30 WET)

Iceland	0–1	Denmark
	Report	Vangsgaard 71'

Laugardalsvöllur, Reykjavík
Attendance: 1,712
Referee: Ivana Martinčić (Croatia)

31 October 2023
18:00

Denmark	2–1	Wales
Vangsgaard 28'; Bredgaard 39'	Report	Fishlock 72'

Viborg Stadium, Viborg
Attendance: 2,227
Referee: Sandra Braz (Portugal)
31 October 2023
20:00 (19:00 WET)

Iceland	0–2	Germany
	Report	Gwinn 65' (pen.); Bühl 90+4'

Laugardalsvöllur, Reykjavík
Attendance: 1,245
Referee: Tess Olofsson (Sweden)

1 December 2023
20:15 (19:15 GMT)

Wales	1–2	Iceland
Hughes 90+4'	Report	Ladd 29' (o.g.); Zomers 79'

Cardiff City Stadium, Cardiff
Attendance: 5,275
Referee: Esther Staubli (Switzerland)
1 December 2023
20:30

Germany	3–0	Denmark
Popp 14'; Hegering 26'; Bühl 90+3'	Report

Ostseestadion, Rostock
Attendance: 19,180
Referee: Maria Sole Ferrieri Caputi (Italy)

5 December 2023
19:30

Denmark	0–1	Iceland
	Report	Vilhjálmsdóttir 77'

Viborg Stadium, Viborg
Attendance: 4,453
Referee: Catarina Campos (Portugal)
5 December 2023
19:30 (18:30 GMT)

Wales	0–0	Germany
	Report

Swansea Stadium, Swansea
Attendance: 5,982
Referee: Iuliana Demetrescu (Romania)

=== Group 4 ===
Pos	Team	Pld	W	D	L	GF	GA	GD	Pts	Qualification or relegation	(Spain)	(Italy)	(Sweden)	(Switzerland)
1	Spain	6	5	0	1	23	9	+14	15	Qualification for Nations League Finals	—	2–3	5–3	5–0
2	Italy	6	3	1	2	8	5	+3	10		0–1	—	0–1	3–0
3	Sweden (O)	6	2	1	3	8	10	−2	7	Qualification for relegation play-offs	2–3	1–1	—	1–0
4	Switzerland (R)	6	1	0	5	2	17	−15	3	Relegation to League B	1–7	0–1	1–0	—

Source: UEFA
Rules for classification: Tiebreakers
(O) Play-off winners; (R) Relegated
22 September 2023
18:30

Sweden	2–3	Spain
Eriksson 23'; Hurtig 82'	Report	Del Castillo 38'; Navarro 77'; Caldentey 90+6' (pen.)

Gamla Ullevi, Gothenburg
Attendance: 16,114
Referee: Rebecca Welch (England)
22 September 2023
19:30

Switzerland	0–1	Italy
	Report	Caruso 64'

Kybunpark, St. Gallen
Attendance: 6,452
Referee: Lina Lehtovaara (Finland)

26 September 2023
17:45

Italy	0–1	Sweden
	Report	Kaneryd 14'

Stadio Teofilo Patini, Castel di Sangro
Attendance: 2,483
Referee: Ivana Projkovska (North Macedonia)
26 September 2023
21:00

Spain	5–0	Switzerland
García 15'; Bonmatí 45+1', 49'; Gabarro 57'; Oroz 87'	Report

Nuevo Arcángel, Córdoba
Attendance: 14,194
Referee: Monika Mularczyk (Poland)

27 October 2023
17:45

Italy	0–1	Spain
	Report	Hermoso 89'

Stadio Arechi, Salerno
Attendance: 4,694
Referee: Alina Peşu (Romania)
27 October 2023
18:30

Sweden	1–0	Switzerland
Eriksson 44'	Report

Gamla Ullevi, Gothenburg
Attendance: 13,123
Referee: Riem Hussein (Germany)

31 October 2023
18:30

Sweden	1–1	Italy
Sembrant 90+6'	Report	Giacinti 57'

Eleda Stadion, Malmö
Attendance: 11,376
Referee: Stéphanie Frappart (France)
31 October 2023
19:00

Switzerland	1–7	Spain
Pilgrim 69'	Report	Hernández 4'; Putellas 11', 62' (pen.); Méndez 56'; Del Castillo 72', 89'; Oroz 90+3'

Letzigrund, Zürich
Attendance: 8,515
Referee: Iuliana Demetrescu (Romania)

1 December 2023
20:00

Switzerland	1–0	Sweden
Crnogorčević 6'	Report

Swissporarena, Lucerne
Attendance: 3,938
Referee: Frida Klarlund (Denmark)
1 December 2023
21:30

Spain	2–3	Italy
Del Castillo 12'; González 76'	Report	Giacinti 46'; Cambiaghi 57'; Linari 64'

Pasarón, Pontevedra
Attendance: 9,212
Referee: Eleni Antoniou (Greece)

5 December 2023
19:00

Italy	3–0	Switzerland
Giugliano 31'; Salvai 48'; Caruso 85'	Report

Stadio Ennio Tardini, Parma
Attendance: 3,500
Referee: Volha Blotskaya (Belarus)
5 December 2023
19:00

Spain	5–3	Sweden
Paralluelo 11'; Del Castillo 51'; Caldentey 78', 89'; Fiamma 81'	Report	Zigiotti Olme 1'; Asllani 14'; Blackstenius 29'

La Rosaleda, Málaga
Attendance: 15,896
Referee: Kateryna Monzul (Ukraine)

== Nations League Finals ==
The draw for the Nations League Finals was held on 11 December 2023. Spain hosted Netherlands and France hosted Germany in the semi-final matches, and the winner and loser of the Spain–Netherlands match hosted the final and third place play-off, respectively.

Times are CET (UTC+1), as listed by UEFA (local times, if different, are in parentheses).

=== Bracket ===
Semi-finals
23 February 2024 – Seville
Spain	3
Netherlands	0
23 February 2024 – Décines-Charpieu
France	2
Germany	1

Final
28 February 2024 – Seville
Spain	2
France	0
Third place play-off
28 February 2024 – Heerenveen
Netherlands	0
Germany	2

=== Semi-finals ===
23 February 2024
21:00

Spain	3–0	Netherlands
Hermoso 41'; Bonmatí 45'; Batlle 77'	Report

La Cartuja, Seville
Attendance: 21,856
Referee: Rebecca Welch (England)

23 February 2024
21:00

France	2–1	Germany
Diani 41'; Karchaoui 45+4' (pen.)	Report	Gwinn 82' (pen.)

Parc Olympique Lyonnais, Décines-Charpieu
Attendance: 30,267
Referee: Esther Staubli (Switzerland)

=== Third-place play-off ===
28 February 2024
20:45

Netherlands	0–2	Germany
	Report	Bühl 66'; Schüller 78'

Abe Lenstra Stadion, Heerenveen
Attendance: 21,128
Referee: Stéphanie Frappart (France)

=== Final ===
28 February 2024
19:00

Spain	2–0	France
Bonmatí 32'; Caldentey 53'	Report

Estadio de La Cartuja, Seville
Attendance: 32,657
Referee: Tess Olofsson (Sweden)

== Qualified teams for 2024 Summer Olympics ==
The following three teams from UEFA qualified for the 2024 Summer Olympic women's football tournament, including France, who qualified as the hosts.

Team	Qualified as	Qualified on	Previous appearances in Summer Olympics (Note: Italics indicates host for that year, Bold indicates champions)
France	Host	13 September 2017	2 (2012, 2016)
Spain	Nations League finalist	23 February 2024	0 (Debut)
Germany	Nations League third place match winner (Note: The two Nations League finalists would qualify for the Olympics. As France was one of the finalists, the other spot was awarded to the winner of the third place play-off.)	28 February 2024	5 (1996, 2000, 2004, 2008, **2016**)

== League ranking ==
The 16 League A teams were ranked 1st to 16th overall in the 2023–24 UEFA Women's Nations League according to the following rules:

- The teams finishing first in their groups were ranked 1st to 4th according to their finish in the Nations League Finals.
- The teams finishing second in their groups were ranked 5th to 8th according to the results of the league phase.
- The teams finishing third in their groups were ranked 9th to 12th according to the results of the league phase.
- The teams finishing fourth in their groups were ranked 13th to 16th according to the results of the league phase.

Rnk	Grp	Team	Pld	W	D	L	GF	GA	GD	Pts	Relegation
1	A4	Spain	6	5	0	1	23	9	+14	15	
2	A2	France	6	5	1	0	9	1	+8	16	
3	A3	Germany	6	4	1	1	14	3	+11	13	
4	A1	Netherlands	6	4	0	2	14	6	+8	12	
5	A1	England	6	4	0	2	15	8	+7	12	
6	A3	Denmark	6	4	0	2	10	6	+4	12	
7	A4	Italy	6	3	1	2	8	5	+3	10	
8	A2	Austria	6	3	1	2	7	8	−1	10	
9	A3	Iceland	6	3	0	3	4	8	−4	9	Qualification for relegation play-offs
10	A1	Belgium	6	2	2	2	7	10	−3	8	Qualification for relegation play-offs
11	A4	Sweden	6	2	1	3	8	10	−2	7	Qualification for relegation play-offs
12	A2	Norway	6	1	2	3	9	8	+1	5	Qualification for relegation play-offs
13	A2	Portugal	6	1	0	5	5	13	−8	3	Relegation to League B
14	A4	Switzerland	6	1	0	5	2	17	−15	3	Relegation to League B
15	A1	Scotland	6	0	2	4	3	15	−12	2	Relegation to League B
16	A3	Wales	6	0	1	5	4	15	−11	1	Relegation to League B

Source: UEFA
Rules for classification: Ranking criteria

== Goalscorers ==
There were 142 goals scored in 48 matches, for an average of 2.96 goals per match.

6 goals

- (Netherlands) Lineth Beerensteyn

5 goals

- (Spain) Athenea del Castillo

4 goals

- (Denmark) Amalie Vangsgaard
- (Germany) Klara Bühl

3 goals

- (Austria) Eileen Campbell
- (Denmark) Pernille Harder
- (England) Lucy Bronze
- (England) Lauren Hemp
- (Germany) Giulia Gwinn
- (Germany) Lea Schüller
- (Norway) Ada Hegerberg
- (Spain) Mariona Caldentey

2 goals

- (Belgium) Marie Detruyer
- (Belgium) Tessa Wullaert
- (England) Lauren James
- (England) Fran Kirby
- (France) Grace Geyoro
- (France) Wendie Renard
- (Italy) Arianna Caruso
- (Italy) Valentina Giacinti
- (Netherlands) Esmee Brugts
- (Netherlands) Damaris Egurrola
- (Norway) Karina Sævik
- (Portugal) Carole Costa
- (Spain) Aitana Bonmatí
- (Spain) Maite Oroz
- (Spain) Alexia Putellas
- (Sweden) Magdalena Eriksson
- (Wales) Jess Fishlock

1 goal

- (Austria) Barbara Dunst
- (Austria) Viktoria Pinther
- (Austria) Katharina Schiechtl
- (Belgium) Jassina Blom
- (Belgium) Laura De Neve
- (Belgium) Kassandra Missipo
- (Denmark) Sofie Bredgaard
- (Denmark) Frederikke Thøgersen
- (Denmark) Sanne Troelsgaard
- (England) Alex Greenwood
- (England) Beth Mead
- (England) Alessia Russo
- (England) Georgia Stanway
- (England) Ella Toone
- (France) Selma Bacha
- (France) Amandine Henry
- (France) Marie-Antoinette Katoto
- (France) Eugénie Le Sommer
- (Germany) Nicole Anyomi
- (Germany) Marina Hegering
- (Germany) Alexandra Popp
- (Iceland) Glódís Perla Viggósdóttir
- (Iceland) Karólína Lea Vilhjálmsdóttir
- (Iceland) Dilja Zomers
- (Italy) Michela Cambiaghi
- (Italy) Manuela Giugliano
- (Italy) Elena Linari
- (Italy) Cecilia Salvai
- (Netherlands) Daniëlle van de Donk
- (Netherlands) Renate Jansen
- (Netherlands) Lieke Martens
- (Netherlands) Jill Roord
- (Norway) Sophie Román Haug
- (Norway) Marit Bratberg Lund
- (Norway) Frida Maanum
- (Norway) Elisabeth Terland
- (Portugal) Ana Capeta
- (Portugal) Andreia Jacinto
- (Portugal) Tatiana Pinto
- (Scotland) Erin Cuthbert
- (Scotland) Kirsty Hanson
- (Scotland) Sophie Howard
- (Spain) Fiamma Benítez
- (Spain) Inma Gabarro
- (Spain) Lucía García
- (Spain) Esther González
- (Spain) Jenni Hermoso
- (Spain) Oihane Hernández
- (Spain) María Méndez
- (Spain) Eva Navarro
- (Spain) Salma Paralluelo
- (Sweden) Kosovare Asllani
- (Sweden) Stina Blackstenius
- (Sweden) Lina Hurtig
- (Sweden) Johanna Rytting Kaneryd
- (Sweden) Linda Sembrant
- (Sweden) Julia Zigiotti Olme
- (Switzerland) Ana-Maria Crnogorčević
- (Switzerland) Alayah Pilgrim
- (Wales) Ceri Holland
- (Wales) Elise Hughes

1 own goal

- (Norway) Maren Mjelde (against France)
- (Portugal) Catarina Amado (against Austria)
- (Wales) Hayley Ladd (against Iceland)
- (Wales) Rhiannon Roberts (against Germany)
