= UEFA Women's Euro 2025 qualifying League A =

Tournament details
- Dates: 5 April – 16 July 2024
- Teams: 16
- Relegated: Czech Republic; Finland; Poland; Republic of Ireland

Tournament statistics
- Matches played: 48
- Goals scored: 134 (2.79 per match)
- Attendance: 557,623 (11,617 per match)
- Top scorer(s): (Germany) Lea Schüller (6 goals)
- Women's Nations League Women's Euro qualifying

League A of UEFA Women's Euro 2025 qualifying was the top division of qualifying for UEFA Women's Euro 2025, the international football competition involving the women's national teams of the member associations of UEFA. The results were also used to determine the leagues for the 2025 UEFA Women's Nations League competition.

== Format ==
League A consisted of the 16 top-ranked UEFA members in the 2023–24 UEFA Women's Nations League ranking, split into four groups of four. Each team played six matches within their group, using the home-and-away round-robin format with double matchdays in April, May to June, and July 2024.

After the league phase, the top two teams of each group qualified automatically for the final tournament and the bottom two teams of each group advanced to the play-offs.

For the first play-off round the eight League A teams were seeded, and drawn against the eight best-ranked teams in League C. The winner of those ties will advance to the second round.

The competition also acted as the first phase for the 2025 UEFA Women's Nations League, which will use an identical league structure. The fourth-placed team from each group was relegated to League B.

== Seeding ==
Teams were allocated to League A after the conclusion of the promotion/relegation matches and Nations League Finals of the 2023–24 UEFA Women's Nations League on 28 February 2024. Teams were split into four pots of four teams, ordered based on their overall ranking.

Pot 1
Team	Rank
Spain	1
France	2
Germany	3
Netherlands	4

Pot 2
Team	Rank
England	5
Denmark	6
Italy	7
Austria	8

Pot 3
Team	Rank
Iceland (Note: Belgium, Bosnia and Herzegovina, Croatia, Hungary, Iceland, Norway, Serbia, and Sweden participated in the League A vs League B promotion/relegation matches in February 2024 to determine each team's league allocation.)	9
Belgium	10
Sweden	11
Norway	12

Pot 4
Team	Rank
Republic of Ireland	17
Finland	18
Poland	19
Czech Republic	20

The draw took place in Nyon, Switzerland on 5 March 2024 at 13:00 CET. Each group contained one team from each pot. The draw started with Pot 1 and ended with Pot 4, with drawn teams assigned to the first available group in ascending order from A1 to A4.

== Groups ==
Times are CEST (UTC+2), as listed by UEFA (local times, if different, are in parentheses).

=== Group 1 ===
Pos	Team	Pld	W	D	L	GF	GA	GD	Pts	Qualification	(Italy)	(Netherlands)	(Norway)	(Finland)
1	Italy	6	2	3	1	8	3	+5	9 (Note: Head-to-head points: Italy 4, Netherlands 1.)	Qualify for final tournament	—	2–0	1–1	4–0
2	Netherlands	6	2	3	1	4	4	0	9	Qualify for final tournament	0–0	—	1–0	1–0
3	Norway	6	1	4	1	7	4	+3	7	Advance to play-offs (seeded)	0–0	1–1	—	4–0
4	Finland (R)	6	1	2	3	4	12	−8	5	Advance to play-offs (seeded) and relegation to League B	2–1	1–1	1–1	—

Source: UEFA
Rules for classification: Tiebreakers
(R) Relegated
Notes:
5 April 2024
18:00

Norway	4–0	Finland
Bizet 24'; Román Haug 41'; Bjelde 78'; Terland 81'	Report

Ullevaal Stadion, Oslo
Attendance: 3,106
Referee: Catarina Campos (Portugal)
5 April 2024
18:15

Italy	2–0	Netherlands
Giacinti 4'; Bonfantini 59'	Report

Stadio San Vito-Gigi Marulla, Cosenza
Attendance: 4,300
Referee: Ivana Martinčić (Croatia)

9 April 2024
18:15 (19:15 UTC+3)

Finland	2–1	Italy
Rantala 48'; Linari 75' (o.g.)	Report	Di Guglielmo 39'

Helsinki Football Stadium, Helsinki
Attendance: 5,000
Referee: Marta Huerta de Aza (Spain)
9 April 2024
20:45

Netherlands	1–0	Norway
Beerensteyn 6'	Report

Rat Verlegh Stadion, Breda
Attendance: 9,486
Referee: Cheryl Foster (Wales)

31 May 2024
18:00

Norway	0–0	Italy
	Report

Ullevaal Stadion, Oslo
Attendance: 9,307
Referee: Stéphanie Frappart (France)
31 May 2024
20:45

Netherlands	1–0	Finland
Beerensteyn 65'	Report

Sparta Stadion Het Kasteel, Rotterdam
Attendance: 9,089
Referee: Frida Klarlund (Denmark)

4 June 2024
18:00 (19:00 UTC+3)

Finland	1–1	Netherlands
Rantala 77'	Report	Beerensteyn 17'

Tammelan Stadion, Tampere
Attendance: 7,677
Referee: Sandra Braz (Portugal)
4 June 2024
18:15

Italy	1–1	Norway
Giugliano 6'	Report	Maanum 81'

Stadio Paolo Mazza, Ferrara
Attendance: 2,198
Referee: Rebecca Welch (England)

12 July 2024
18:00 (19:00 UTC+3)

Finland	1–1	Norway
E. Koivisto 90+8'	Report	Reiten 7'

Veritas Stadion, Turku
Attendance: 7,345
Referee: Katalin Kulcsár (Hungary)
12 July 2024
20:45

Netherlands	0–0	Italy
	Report

Fortuna Sittard Stadion, Sittard
Attendance: 8,563
Referee: Tess Olofsson (Sweden)

16 July 2024
19:00

Norway	1–1	Netherlands
Graham Hansen 61'	Report	Miedema 80'

Brann Stadion, Bergen
Attendance: 8,574
Referee: Alina Peşu (Romania)
16 July 2024
19:00

Italy	4–0	Finland
Beccari 20'; Giugliano 31'; Cambiaghi 74'; Nyström 88' (o.g.)	Report

Stadio Druso, Bolzano
Attendance: 2,689
Referee: Ivana Projkovska (North Macedonia)

=== Group 2 ===
Pos	Team	Pld	W	D	L	GF	GA	GD	Pts	Qualification	(Spain)	(Denmark)	(Belgium)	(Czech Republic)
1	Spain	6	5	0	1	18	5	+13	15	Qualify for final tournament	—	3–2	2–0	3–1
2	Denmark	6	4	0	2	14	8	+6	12	Qualify for final tournament	0–2	—	4–2	2–0
3	Belgium	6	1	1	4	5	18	−13	4 (Note: Head-to-head points: Belgium 4, Czech Republic 1.)	Advance to play-offs (seeded)	0–7	0–3	—	1–1
4	Czech Republic (R)	6	1	1	4	6	12	−6	4	Advance to play-offs (seeded) and relegation to League B	2–1	1–3	1–2	—

Source: UEFA
Rules for classification: Tiebreakers
(R) Relegated
Notes:
5 April 2024
18:00

Czech Republic	1–3	Denmark
Stašková 42'	Report	Vangsgaard 7'; Ballisager 68'; Hasbo 72'

Městský fotbalový stadion, Uherské Hradiště
Attendance: 2,426
Referee: Iuliana Demetrescu (Romania)
5 April 2024
20:45

Belgium	0–7	Spain
	Report	Paralluelo 8', 30', 47'; Hermoso 16'; González 64', 90'; S. García 85'

Den Dreef, Leuven
Attendance: 7,123
Referee: Katalin Kulcsár (Hungary)

9 April 2024
18:00

Denmark	4–2	Belgium
Vangsgaard 29', 39'; Svava 44'; Thøgersen 62'	Report	Kees 67'; Delacauw 72'

Viborg Stadium, Viborg
Attendance: 1,660
Referee: Rebecca Welch (England)
9 April 2024
19:00

Spain	3–1	Czech Republic
Méndez 58'; Hermoso 62'; Caldentey 70'	Report	Sonntagová 56'

El Plantío, Burgos
Attendance: 9,982
Referee: Jelena Cvetković (Serbia)

31 May 2024
18:30

Czech Republic	1–2	Belgium
Dubcová 86' (pen.)	Report	Wullaert 12'; De Caigny 14'

Eden Arena, Prague
Attendance: 5,892
Referee: Silvia Gasperotti (Italy)
31 May 2024
19:00

Denmark	0–2	Spain
	Report	Hermoso 17'; Caldentey 28' (pen.)

Vejle Stadium, Vejle
Attendance: 6,014
Referee: Ivana Projkovska (North Macedonia)

4 June 2024
20:00

Belgium	1–1	Czech Republic
Blom 79'	Report	Dubcová 19'

Stayen, Sint-Truiden
Attendance: 2,366
Referee: Ewa Augustyn (Poland)
4 June 2024
21:30 (20:30 UTC+1)

Spain	3–2	Denmark
Vilamala 74'; Paredes 77'; L. García 90+2'	Report	Thomsen 4', 72'

Heliodoro Rodríguez López, Santa Cruz de Tenerife
Attendance: 17,532
Referee: Maria Sole Ferrieri Caputi (Italy)

12 July 2024
18:00

Czech Republic	2–1	Spain
Svitková 44'; Bartoňová 51' (pen.)	Report	Bonmatí 15'

Letní stadion, Chomutov
Attendance: 1,893
Referee: Riem Hussein (Germany)
12 July 2024
20:00

Belgium	0–3	Denmark
	Report	Cayman 60' (o.g.); Harder 65'; Holmgaard 82'

Stayen, Sint-Truiden
Attendance: 2,764
Referee: Ivana Martinčić (Croatia)

16 July 2024
19:00

Spain	2–0	Belgium
Bonmatí 39'; Abelleira 90+1'	Report

Riazor, A Coruña
Attendance: 16,650
Referee: Iuliana Demetrescu (Romania)
16 July 2024
19:00

Denmark	2–0	Czech Republic
Bruun 55'; Thomsen 63'	Report

Vejle Stadium, Vejle
Attendance: 3,303
Referee: Abigail Byrne (England)

=== Group 3 ===
Pos	Team	Pld	W	D	L	GF	GA	GD	Pts	Qualification	(France)	(England)	(Sweden)	(Republic of Ireland)
1	France	6	4	0	2	8	7	+1	12	Qualify for final tournament	—	1–2	2–1	1–0
2	England	6	3	2	1	8	5	+3	11	Qualify for final tournament	1–2	—	1–1	2–1
3	Sweden	6	2	2	2	6	4	+2	8	Advance to play-offs (seeded)	0–1	0–0	—	1–0
4	Republic of Ireland (R)	6	1	0	5	4	10	−6	3	Advance to play-offs (seeded) and relegation to League B	3–1	0–2	0–3	—

Source: UEFA
Rules for classification: Tiebreakers
(R) Relegated
5 April 2024
21:00 (20:00 UTC+1)

England	1–1	Sweden
Russo 24'	Report	Rolfö 64'

Wembley Stadium, London
Attendance: 63,248
Referee: Ivana Projkovska (North Macedonia)
5 April 2024
21:10

France	1–0	Republic of Ireland
Katoto 6'	Report

Stade Saint-Symphorien, Metz
Attendance: 16,772
Referee: Maria Sole Ferrieri Caputi (Italy)

9 April 2024
19:00

Sweden	0–1	France
	Report	Renard 80'

Gamla Ullevi, Gothenburg
Attendance: 11,278
Referee: Ewa Augustyn (Poland)
9 April 2024
20:30 (19:30 UTC+1)

Republic of Ireland	0–2	England
	Report	James 12'; Greenwood 18' (pen.)

Dublin Arena, Dublin
Attendance: 32,742
Referee: Lina Lehtovaara (Finland)

31 May 2024
20:30 (19:30 UTC+1)

Republic of Ireland	0–3	Sweden
	Report	Rytting Kaneryd 26', 86'; Rolfö 62'

Dublin Arena, Dublin
Attendance: 22,868
Referee: Katalin Kulcsár (Hungary)
31 May 2024
21:00 (20:00 UTC+1)

England	1–2	France
Mead 30'	Report	De Almeida 41'; Katoto 68'

St James' Park, Newcastle
Attendance: 42,561
Referee: Marta Huerta de Aza (Spain)

4 June 2024
18:30

Sweden	1–0	Republic of Ireland
Eriksson 84'	Report

Friends Arena, Solna
Attendance: 21,216
Referee: Alina Peşu (Romania)
4 June 2024
21:00

France	1–2	England
Diani 72' (pen.)	Report	Stanway 21'; Russo 34'

Stade Geoffroy-Guichard, Saint-Étienne
Attendance: 10,194
Referee: Ivana Martinčić (Croatia)

12 July 2024
21:00 (20:00 UTC+1)

England	2–1	Republic of Ireland
Russo 5'; Stanway 57' (pen.)	Report	Russell 90+4'

Carrow Road, Norwich
Attendance: 23,003
Referee: Catarina Campos (Portugal)
12 July 2024
21:10

France	2–1	Sweden
Karchaoui 32'; Katoto 74'	Report	Rybrink 49'

Stade Gaston Gérard, Dijon
Attendance: 12,317
Referee: Jelena Cvetković (Serbia)

16 July 2024
19:00

Sweden	0–0	England
	Report

Gamla Ullevi, Gothenburg
Attendance: 16,789
Referee: Maria Sole Ferrieri Caputi (Italy)
16 July 2024
19:00 (18:00 UTC+1)

Republic of Ireland	3–1	France
O'Sullivan 67'; Russell 76'; Patten 90'	Report	Bècho 79'

Páirc Uí Chaoimh, Cork
Attendance: 18,399
Referee: Olatz Rivera Olmedo (Spain)

=== Group 4 ===
Pos	Team	Pld	W	D	L	GF	GA	GD	Pts	Qualification	(Germany)	(Iceland)	(Austria)	(Poland)
1	Germany	6	5	0	1	17	8	+9	15	Qualify for final tournament	—	3–1	4–0	4–1
2	Iceland	6	4	1	1	11	5	+6	13	Qualify for final tournament	3–0	—	2–1	3–0
3	Austria	6	2	1	3	10	12	−2	7	Advance to play-offs (seeded)	2–3	1–1	—	3–1
4	Poland (R)	6	0	0	6	4	17	−13	0	Advance to play-offs (seeded) and relegation to League B	1–3	0–1	1–3	—

Source: UEFA
Rules for classification: Tiebreakers
(R) Relegated
5 April 2024
18:45 (16:45 UTC+0)

Iceland	3–0	Poland
Mesjasz 42' (o.g.); Zomers 43'; Jónsdóttir 66'	Report

Kópavogsvöllur, Kópavogur
Attendance: 1,152
Referee: Frida Klarlund (Denmark)
5 April 2024
20:30

Austria	2–3	Germany
Campbell 9', 17'	Report	Bühl 39', 49'; Gwinn 63' (pen.)

Raiffeisen Arena, Linz
Attendance: 7,500
Referee: Tess Olofsson (Sweden)

9 April 2024
18:00

Poland	1–3	Austria
Kamczyk 55'	Report	Puntigam 15'; Purtscheller 66'; Campbell 90+2'

Stadion Miejski w Gdyni, Gdynia
Attendance: 3,920
Referee: Stéphanie Frappart (France)
9 April 2024
18:10

Germany	3–1	Iceland
Schüller 4', 34'; Oberdorf 45+3'	Report	Eiríksdóttir 23'

Tivoli, Aachen
Attendance: 16,503
Referee: Jana Adámková (Czech Republic)

31 May 2024
18:00

Austria	1–1	Iceland
Puntigam 26' (pen.)	Report	Viggósdóttir 76' (pen.)

Josko Arena, Ried im Innkreis
Attendance: 3,788
Referee: Lina Lehtovaara (Finland)
31 May 2024
20:30

Germany	4–1	Poland
Zieniewicz 34' (o.g.); Schüller 77'; Gwinn 84', 88' (pen.)	Report	Padilla 1'

Ostseestadion, Rostock
Attendance: 18,765
Referee: Jelena Cvetković (Serbia)

4 June 2024
18:00

Poland	1–3	Germany
Grabowska 12'	Report	Schüller 51', 69'; Bühl 77'

Stadion Miejski w Gdyni, Gdynia
Attendance: 4,012
Referee: Olatz Rivera Olmedo (Spain)
4 June 2024
21:30 (19:30 UTC+0)

Iceland	2–1	Austria
Eiríksdóttir 17'; Antonsdóttir 70'	Report	Campbell 44'

Laugardalsvöllur, Reykjavík
Attendance: 2,067
Referee: Désirée Grundbacher (Switzerland)

12 July 2024
18:00

Austria	3–1	Poland
Degen 37'; Campbell 67'; Schasching 69'	Report	Padilla 75'

Stadion Schnabelholz, Altach
Attendance: 2,343
Referee: Eleni Antoniou (Greece)
12 July 2024
18:15 (16:15 UTC+0)

Iceland	3–0	Germany
Sigurðardóttir 14'; Jóhannsdóttir 52'; Jónsdóttir 83'	Report

Laugardalsvöllur, Reykjavík
Attendance: 5,243
Referee: Cheryl Foster (Wales)

16 July 2024
19:00

Germany	4–0	Austria
Bühl 11', 90+2'; Brand 39'; Schüller 53'	Report

Niedersachsenstadion, Hanover
Attendance: 43,953
Referee: Shona Shukrula (Netherlands)
16 July 2024
19:00

Poland	0–1	Iceland
	Report	Jónsdóttir 32'

Zagłębiowski Park Sportowy, Sosnowiec
Attendance: 2,051
Referee: Kirsty Dowle (England)

== League ranking ==
The 16 League A teams were ranked 1st to 16th overall in the UEFA Women's Euro 2025 qualifying according to their league ranking.

The last-placed teams from each group were relegated to League B for the upcoming 2025 Women's Nations League.

Rnk	Grp	Team	Pld	W	D	L	GF	GA	GD	Pts	Relegation
1	A2	Spain	6	5	0	1	18	5	+13	15	
2	A4	Germany	6	5	0	1	17	8	+9	15	
3	A3	France	6	4	0	2	8	7	+1	12	
4	A1	Italy	6	2	3	1	8	3	+5	9	
5	A4	Iceland	6	4	1	1	11	5	+6	13	
6	A2	Denmark	6	4	0	2	14	8	+6	12	
7	A3	England	6	3	2	1	8	5	+3	11	
8	A1	Netherlands	6	2	3	1	4	4	0	9	
9	A3	Sweden	6	2	2	2	6	4	+2	8	
10	A1	Norway	6	1	4	1	7	4	+3	7	
11	A4	Austria	6	2	1	3	10	12	−2	7	
12	A2	Belgium	6	1	1	4	5	18	−13	4	
13	A1	Finland	6	1	2	3	4	12	−8	5	Relegation to League B
14	A2	Czech Republic	6	1	1	4	6	12	−6	4	Relegation to League B
15	A3	Republic of Ireland	6	1	0	5	4	10	−6	3	Relegation to League B
16	A4	Poland	6	0	0	6	4	17	−13	0	Relegation to League B

Source: UEFA
Rules for classification: Ranking criteria

== Top goalscorers ==
There were 134 goals scored in 48 matches, for an average of 2.79 goals per match.

6 goals

- (Germany) Lea Schüller

5 goals

- (Austria) Eileen Campbell
- (Germany) Klara Bühl

3 goals

- (Denmark) Janni Thomsen
- (Denmark) Amalie Vangsgaard
- (England) Alessia Russo
- (France) Marie-Antoinette Katoto
- (Germany) Giulia Gwinn
- (Iceland) Sveindís Jane Jónsdóttir
- (Netherlands) Lineth Beerensteyn
- (Spain) Jenni Hermoso
- (Spain) Salma Paralluelo

2 goals

- (Austria) Sarah Puntigam
- (Czech Republic) Kamila Dubcová
- (England) Georgia Stanway
- (Finland) Jutta Rantala
- (Iceland) Hlín Eiríksdóttir
- (Italy) Manuela Giugliano
- (Poland) Natalia Padilla
- (Republic of Ireland) Julie-Ann Russell
- (Spain) Aitana Bonmatí
- (Spain) Mariona Caldentey
- (Spain) Esther González
- (Sweden) Fridolina Rolfö
- (Sweden) Johanna Rytting Kaneryd

1 goal

- (Austria) Celina Degen
- (Austria) Lilli Purtscheller
- (Austria) Annabel Schasching
- (Belgium) Jassina Blom
- (Belgium) Tine De Caigny
- (Belgium) Féli Delacauw
- (Belgium) Sari Kees
- (Belgium) Tessa Wullaert
- (Czech Republic) Eva Bartoňová
- (Czech Republic) Eliška Sonntagová
- (Czech Republic) Andrea Stašková
- (Czech Republic) Kateřina Svitková
- (Denmark) Stine Ballisager
- (Denmark) Signe Bruun
- (Denmark) Pernille Harder
- (Denmark) Josefine Hasbo
- (Denmark) Sara Holmgaard
- (Denmark) Sofie Svava
- (Denmark) Frederikke Thøgersen
- (England) Alex Greenwood
- (England) Lauren James
- (England) Beth Mead
- (Finland) Emma Koivisto
- (France) Vicki Bècho
- (France) Élisa De Almeida
- (France) Kadidiatou Diani
- (France) Sakina Karchaoui
- (France) Wendie Renard
- (Germany) Jule Brand
- (Germany) Lena Oberdorf
- (Iceland) Hildur Antonsdóttir
- (Iceland) Alexandra Jóhannsdóttir
- (Iceland) Ingibjörg Sigurðardóttir
- (Iceland) Glódís Perla Viggósdóttir
- (Iceland) Diljá Ýr Zomers
- (Italy) Chiara Beccari
- (Italy) Agnese Bonfantini
- (Italy) Michela Cambiaghi
- (Italy) Lucia Di Guglielmo
- (Italy) Valentina Giacinti
- (Netherlands) Vivianne Miedema
- (Norway) Thea Bjelde
- (Norway) Caroline Graham Hansen
- (Norway) Celin Bizet Ildhusøy
- (Norway) Frida Maanum
- (Norway) Guro Reiten
- (Norway) Sophie Román Haug
- (Norway) Elisabeth Terland
- (Poland) Dominika Grabowska
- (Poland) Ewelina Kamczyk
- (Republic of Ireland) Denise O'Sullivan
- (Republic of Ireland) Anna Patten
- (Spain) Teresa Abelleira
- (Spain) Lucía García
- (Spain) Sheila García
- (Spain) María Méndez
- (Spain) Irene Paredes
- (Spain) Bruna Vilamala
- (Sweden) Magdalena Eriksson
- (Sweden) Josefine Rybrink

1 own goal

- (Belgium) Janice Cayman (against Denmark)
- (Finland) Eva Nyström (against Italy)
- (Italy) Elena Linari (against Finland)
- (Poland) Małgorzata Mesjasz (against Iceland)
- (Poland) Wiktoria Zieniewicz (against Germany)

Source: UEFA
