= Amalie Vangsgaard =

Danish footballer (born 1996)

- Vangsgaard in 2026

Personal information
- Full name: Amalie Jørgensen Vangsgaard
- Date of birth: 29 November 1996 (age 29)
- Place of birth: Pandrup, Denmark
- Height: 1.82 m (6 ft 0 in)
- Position: Forward

Team information
- Current team: Aston Villa
- Number: 20

Youth career
- 2000–2008: Jetsmark IF
- 2008–2014: Fortuna Hjørring

Senior career*
Years	Team	Apps	(Gls)
2014–2016	Fortuna Hjørring		
2018–2019	BSF	7	(0)
2019–2021	Nordsjælland	38	(15)
2021–2022	Linköping	35	(23)
2023–2024	Paris Saint-Germain	27	(8)
2024–2026	Juventus	41	(6)
2026–	Aston Villa	11	(3)

International career^{‡}
2013–2015	Denmark U19	20	(3)
2022–	Denmark	49	(14)
- * Club domestic league appearances and goals as of 22 November 2026 ‡ National team caps and goals as of 12 October 2026

Amalie Jørgensen Vangsgaard (born 29 November 1996) is a Danish professional footballer who plays as a forward for Women's Super League club Aston Villa and the Denmark national team.

== Club career ==
Vansgaard started her career with Danish side Fortuna Hjørring, helping them win the league and 2016 Danish Women's Cup. In 2019, she signed for Nordsjælland in Denmark, helping them win the 2020 Danish Women's Cup.

In 2021, Vansgaard signed for Swedish club Linköping. On 10 January 2023, Paris Saint-Germain announced the signing of Vangsgaard on a permanent deal until June 2025.

On 7 July 2024, Vangsgaard signed a three-year contract with Juventus. On 1 July 2026, she joined Women's Super League club Aston Villa.

== Career statistics ==
As of match played 22 November 2026

Appearances and goals by club, season and competition
Club	Season	League			National cup (Note: Includes Svenska Cupen, Coupe de France, Coppa Italia)		League cup (Note: Includes Serie A Cup, WSL Players Cup)		Continental		Other		Total	
Club	Season	Division	Apps	Goals	Apps	Goals	Apps	Goals	Apps	Goals	Apps	Goals	Apps	Goals
Fortuna Hjørring	2014–15	3F Ligaen	Stats not available						3 (Note: Appearances in UEFA Women's Champions League)	0	—		3	0
Nordsjælland	2018–19	3F Ligaen	3	3	0	0	—		—		—		3	3
Nordsjælland	2019–20	A-Liga	19	8	0	0	—		—		—		19	8
Nordsjælland	2020–21	A-Liga	16	4	0	0	—		—				16	4
Nordsjælland	Total		38	15	0	0	0	0	0	0	0	0	38	15
Linköping	2021	Damallsvenskan	10	1	3	3	—		—		—		13	1
Linköping	2022	Damallsvenskan	25	22	0	0	—		—		—		25	22
Linköping	Total		35	23	3	3	0	0	0	0	0	0	38	23
Paris Saint-Germain	2022–23	Division 1 Féminine	8	2	0	0	—		2	0	—		10	2
Paris Saint-Germain	2023–24	Division 1 Féminine	19	6	5	3	—		9	0	1 (Note: Appearance in Trophée des Championnes)	0	34	9
Paris Saint-Germain	Total		27	8	5	3	0	0	11	0	0	0	44	11
Juventus	2024–25	Serie A Women	22	3	6	3	0	0	8	1	1 (Note: Appearance in Supercoppa Italiana)	1	31	8
Juventus	2025–26	Serie A Women	19	3	6	2	4	1	8	2	0	0	37	8
Juventus	Total		41	6	12	5	4	1	16	3	1	1	68	16
Aston Villa	2026–27	Women's Super League	11	3	0	0	2	0	—		—		13	3
Career total			152	55	20	11	6	1	27	3	2	1	207	71

=== International ===
As of match played 12 October 2026

Appearances and goals by national team and year
National team	Year	Apps	Goals
Denmark	2022	4	0
Denmark	2023	15	5
Denmark	2024	10	4
Denmark	2025	12	2
Denmark	2026	8	3
Total		49	14

Scores and results list Denmark's goal tally first, score column indicates score after each Vangsgaard goal.

List of international goals scored by Amalie Vangsgaard
No.	Date	Venue	Opponent	Score	Result	Competition
1	22 July 2023	Perth Rectangular Stadium, Perth, Australia	China	1–0	1–0	2023 FIFA Women's World Cup
2	22 September 2023	Viborg Stadium, Viborg, Denmark	Germany	1–0	2–0	2023–24 UEFA Women's Nations League
3	22 September 2023	Viborg Stadium, Viborg, Denmark	Germany	2–0	2–0	2023–24 UEFA Women's Nations League
4	27 October 2023	Laugardalsvöllur, Reykjavík, Iceland	Iceland	1–0	1–0	2023–24 UEFA Women's Nations League
5	31 October 2023	Viborg Stadium, Viborg, Denmark	Wales	1–0	2–1	2023–24 UEFA Women's Nations League
6	5 April 2024	Miroslava Valenty Stadium, Uherské Hradiště, Czech Republic	Czech Republic	1–0	3–1	2025 UEFA Women's Euro qualification
7	9 April 2024	Viborg Stadium, Viborg, Denmark	Belgium	1–0	4–2	2025 UEFA Women's Euro qualification
8	9 April 2024	Viborg Stadium, Viborg, Denmark	Belgium	2–0	4–2	2025 UEFA Women's Euro qualification
9	25 October 2024	Aalborg Stadium, Aalborg, Denmark	South Africa	4–0	5–0	Friendly
10	4 April 2025	Cardiff City Stadium, Cardiff, Wales	Wales	2–1	2–1	2025 UEFA Women's Nations League
11	8 July 2025	St. Jakob-Park, Basel, Switzerland	Germany	1–0	1–2	UEFA Women's Euro 2025
12	3 March 2026	Forum Horsens Stadium, Horsens, Denmark	Serbia	2–0	3–1	2027 FIFA Women's World Cup qualification
13	9 June 2026	Serbian FA Sports Center, Stara Pazova, Serbia	Serbia	2–0	4–1	2027 FIFA Women's World Cup qualification
14	9 June 2026	Serbian FA Sports Center, Stara Pazova, Serbia	Serbia	4–1	4–1	2027 FIFA Women's World Cup qualification

== Honours ==
Nordsjaelland

- Danish Women's Cup: 2019–20

Paris Saint-Germain

- Coupe de France: 2023–24

Juventus

- Serie A: 2024–25
- Coppa Italia: 2024–25
- Serie A Women's Cup: 2025

Individual

- Danish Football Player of the Year: 2023
- Damallsvenskan top scorer: 2022
