= Johanna Rytting Kaneryd =

Swedish footballer (born 1997)

- Rytting Kaneryd with Sweden in 2026

Personal information
- Full name: Anna Johanna Rytting Kaneryd
- Date of birth: 12 February 1997 (age 29)
- Place of birth: Kolsva, Sweden
- Height: 1.63 m (5 ft 4 in)
- Position: Midfielder

Team information
- Current team: OL Lyonnes
- Number: 19

Senior career*
Years	Team	Apps	(Gls)
2014	Tyresö FF	5	(0)
2014–2015	Älta IF	7	(1)
2016–2017	Djurgårdens IF	41	(5)
2018–2020	FC Rosengård	41	(3)
2021–2022	BK Häcken	36	(9)
2022–2026	Chelsea	78	(11)
2026–	OL Lyonnes	0	(0)

International career^{‡}
2012	Sweden U17	3	(1)
2016	Sweden U19	2	(0)
2016	Sweden U20		
2021–	Sweden	68	(8)
- * Club domestic league appearances and goals as of 21:30, 3 May 2026 (UTC) ‡ National team caps and goals as of 00:05, 27 April 2026 (UTC)

Anna Johanna Rytting Kaneryd (Swedish: [jʊˈhânːa ˈrʏ̂tːɪŋ ˈkɑ̂ːnɛˌryːd]; born 12 February 1997) is a Swedish professional footballer who plays as a midfielder for Première Ligue club OL Lyonnes and the Sweden national team.

In December 2024, she was awarded the Diamond Ball Award, the highest award in Swedish women's football.

== Club career ==
=== Early career ===
Rytting Kaneryd started her career at Forsby FF in Köping.

After starting the 2014 season with Tyresö FF, making her debut in Damallsvenskan, gaining five appearances out of eight matches played in the league, in June the club announced its withdrawal from the league due to lack of players and economic resources. In July of that same year she therefore decided to accept Älta's proposal by signing a one-and-a-half-year contract and leaving for Elitettan again. In this period, however, she found little space, for her five appearances and a goal in 2014, but only two appearances in the following championship.

=== Djurgården ===
In February 2016, Rytting Kaneryd signed a contract with Djurgården. With coach Yvonne Ekroth she made her debut with the new team a few rounds after her arrival in the meeting with Ilves. Later Ekroth gave her full confidence in her, using her as a starter in all 22 matches of the 2016 Damallsvenskan, where she shares with her teammates a middle-ranking championship finished in 6th place. Thanks to her performances during the season, at Fotbollsgalan 2016, Rytting Kaneryd was named "Årets genombrott" (Breakthrough of the year). She stayed with the club Stockholm also the following season, the team's new coach Joel Riddez continues to trust her, using her in 19 championship matches, also finishing 6th in the standings for 2017.

=== Rosengård ===
Ahead of the 2018 season Rytting Kaneryd was signed by Rosengård, signing a two-year deal. On the same day the move was completed, she injured her cruciate ligament in a training session with Djurgården, causing her to miss the entire 2018 season. On 1 November 2019 she captured her first career trophy, the 2019 Swedish Championship, and extended her contract for three years. She played both home and away matches against Georgian side Lanchkhuti, scoring a goal in both matches.

=== BK Häcken ===
However, before the expiry of the terms of the contract, in December 2020 she moved to Kopparbergs/Göteborg. On 28 January 2021, the company's passage under the control of Bollklubben Häcken was announced, thus becoming its women's section and taking over company logo and colors. Rytting Kaneryd therefore faces the new season in yellow and black gear.

=== Chelsea ===
In August 2022, she moved to Chelsea, signing a three-year deal with an option to extend for a further year. On 8 March 2023, she scored her first goal with Chelsea against Brighton. In the 2022–23 season, she helped her team win the domestic double. On 10 December 2023, Rytting Kaneryd scored a goal in front of the then largest Super League crowd of 59,042. In the 2023–24 FA Cup, she provided two assists in the 3–1 victory over West Ham.

In the 2024-25 season, Rytting Kaneryd played 36 games in all competitions as Chelsea secured a domestic treble of the FA Women's Cup, Women's League Cup and the Women's Super League, going unbeaten in the latter and securing a record points haul. She scored five goals in all competitions, including a volley against Tottenham Hotspur which was nominated for WSL Goal of the Season. Her volley against Tottenham was named as Chelsea's 2024–25 Women's Goal of the Season.

In June 2025, Chelsea announced that Rytting Kaneryd had signed a new contract to 2027.

=== OL Lyonnes ===
On 6 July 2026, it was announced that Rytting Kaneryd signed a three-year contract with Première Ligue club OL Lyonnes until 2029.

Shortly after joining OL, in August 2026, Kaneryd was ruled out for several month after rupturing her ACL during a training session.

== International career ==
=== Youth ===
Rytting Kaneryd was called up by the Swedish Football Association in 2012, initially for the under-15 team, making two friendly appearances before moving on to the under-17 team that same year. Inserted in the squad with the team facing the first phase of qualifying for the 2013 U-17 European Championship, on this occasion she also scored her first goal with the national team, on 3 November, bringing the result with the teams to 2–1 level with Austria before they managed to equalize 2–2 before the end of the match.

Apart from a single appearance with the under-18 team in 2014, Rytting Kaneryd has been in the squad with the under-19 team since 2016, with whom, after two matches at the La Manga tournament, she played in the elite qualifying phase for the 2016 U-19 European Championship in Slovakia.

In the summer of that same year, she played for the under-23 team, with which she faced the Nordic Cup, before a series of unofficial tournaments, remaining with the largest of the youth teams until 2020, earning 20 appearances.

Meanwhile, thanks to the first place obtained at the 2015 Under-19 European Championship in Israel, Sweden obtained the right to participate with an under-20 team in the 2016 U-20 World Cup in Papua New Guinea. Inserted in the squad by the pair of federal coaches Calle Barrling and Anneli Andersen, after having tested her in a couple of friendlies, Rytting Kaneryd played in the tournament in all three matches for the national team in group A of the group stage. It was a 2–0 defeat against North Korea, in the 6–0 victory over Papua New Guinea, where she scored the Swedes' fifth goal, and in a 1–1 draw with Brazil, a national team who, despite finishing the group on equal points, already eliminated them in this phase due to a better goal difference.

=== Senior ===
On 19 February 2021, Rytting Kaneryd made her senior Sweden debut, in a 6–1 friendly win over Austria in Paola, Malta. She was a 61st-minute substitute for Fridolina Rolfö. Coach Peter Gerhardsson put her in the squad for the 2022 Algarve Cup, where the Swedes won first place. On 28 June 2022 she got her first international goal in a friendly against Brazil, tying the game 1–1 in an eventual 3–1 victory for Sweden.

On 13 June 2023, she was included in the 23-player squad for the 2023 World Cup. She played in each of her team's seven games, being substituted six times and coming on in the 76th minute in the third group game against Argentina, when some regular players rested. She and her team were defeated 1–2 in the semi-finals against Spain. She won the bronze medal with a 2–0 win in the game for third place against Australia.

== Career statistics ==
=== Club ===
As of match played 10 May 2026

Appearances and goals by club, season and competition
Club	Season	League			National cup (Note: Includes Svenska Cupen, Women's FA Cup)		League cup (Note: Includes FA Women's League Cup)		Continental (Note: Includes UEFA Women's Champions League)		Total	
Club	Season	Division	Apps	Goals	Apps	Goals	Apps	Goals	Apps	Goals	Apps	Goals
Tyresö	2014	Damallsvenskan	5	0	2	0	—		0	0	7	0
Älta IF	2014	Elitettan	5	1	1	0	—		—		6	1
Älta IF	2015	Elitettan	2	0	0	0	—		—		2	0
Älta IF	Total		7	1	1	0	—		—		8	1
Djurgårdens IF	2016	Damallsvenskan	22	4	4	1	—		—		26	5
Djurgårdens IF	2017	Damallsvenskan	19	1	1	0	—		—		20	1
Djurgårdens IF	Total		41	5	5	1	—		—		46	6
Rosengård	2018	Damallsvenskan	0	0	3	1	—		—		3	1
Rosengård	2019	Damallsvenskan	21	1	1	2	—		—		22	3
Rosengård	2020	Damallsvenskan	20	2	1	0	—		2	2	23	4
Rosengård	Total		41	3	5	3	—		2	2	48	8
BK Häcken	2021	Damallsvenskan	21	5	5	1	—		—		26	6
BK Häcken	2022	Damallsvenskan	15	4	6	4	—		8	1	29	9
BK Häcken	Total		36	9	11	5	—		8	1	55	15
Chelsea	2022–23	Women's Super League	20	1	4	0	3	0	10	0	37	1
Chelsea	2023–24	Women's Super League	18	4	4	0	2	0	10	0	34	4
Chelsea	2024–25	Women's Super League	21	4	4	0	3	1	8	0	36	5
Chelsea	2025–26	Women's Super League	19	2	3	0	3	3	6	2	31	7
Chelsea	Total		78	11	15	0	11	4	34	2	138	17
Career total			208	29	39	9	11	4	44	5	302	47

=== International ===
As of match played 18 April 2026

Appearances and goals by national team and year
National team	Year	Apps	Goals
Sweden	2021	8	0
Sweden	2022	13	1
Sweden	2023	17	2
Sweden	2024	12	4
Sweden	2025	15	1
Sweden	2026	3	0
Total		68	8

Scores and results list Sweden's goal tally first, score column indicates score after each Rytting Kaneryd goal.

List of international goals scored by Johanna Rytting Kaneryd
No.	Date	Venue	Opponent	Score	Result	Competition
1.	28 June 2022	Solna Municipality, Sweden	Brazil	1–1	3–1	Friendly
2.	16 February 2023	Marbella, Spain	China	1–0	4–1	Friendly
3.	26 September 2023	Castel di Sangro, Italy	Italy	1–0	1–0	2023–24 UEFA Women's Nations League
4.	31 May 2024	Dublin, Ireland	Republic of Ireland	1–0	3–0	UEFA Women's Euro 2025 qualifying League A
5.	31 May 2024	Dublin, Ireland	Republic of Ireland	3–0	3–0	UEFA Women's Euro 2025 qualifying League A
6.	25 October 2024	Esch-sur-Alzette, Luxembourg	Luxembourg	2–0	4–0	UEFA Women's Euro 2025 qualifying play-offs
7.	29 October 2024	Gothenburg, Sweden	Luxembourg	2–0	8–0	UEFA Women's Euro 2025 qualifying play-offs
8.	3 June 2025	Solna Municipality, Sweden	Denmark	2–0	6–1	2025 UEFA Women's Nations League A
9.	5 June 2026	Odense, Denmark	Denmark	1–1	1–2	2027 FIFA World Cup qualification

== Honours ==
Tyresö FF

- UEFA Champions League runner-up: 2013–14

Rosengård

- Damallsvenskan : 2019

Häcken

- Svenska Cupen Damer : 2020–2021

Chelsea

- Women's Super League: 2022–23, 2023–24, 2024–25
- Women's FA Cup: 2022–23, 2024–25
- FA Women's League Cup: 2024–25, 2025–26

Individual

- WSL Goal of the Month: October 2024
- Diamond Ball Award: 2024
