= Diljá Ýr Zomers =

Icelandic footballer (born 2001)

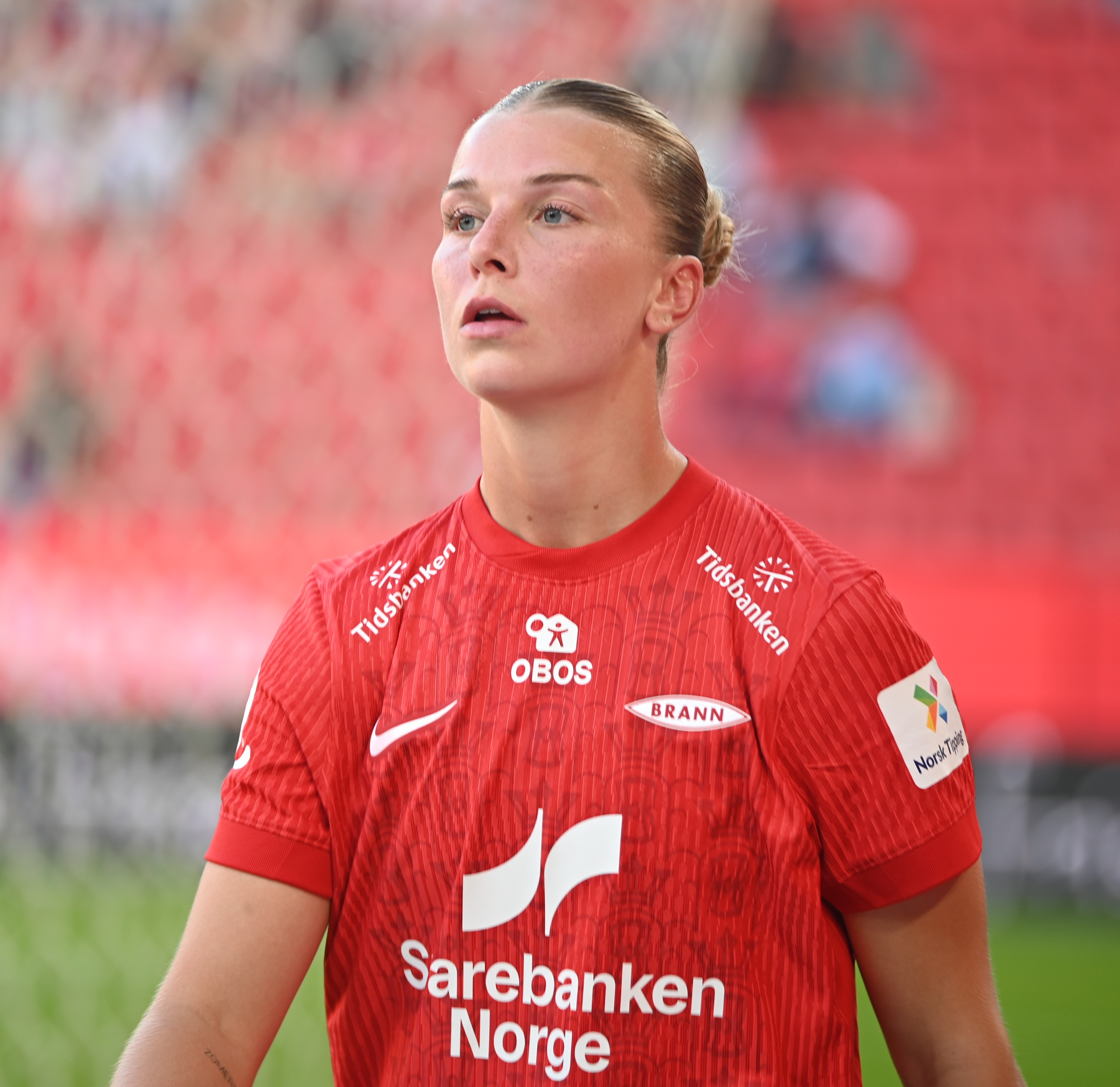
- Diljá in 2026

Personal information
- Date of birth: 11 November 2001 (age 24)
- Place of birth: Iceland
- Positions: Midfielder; winger; striker

Team information
- Current team: Brann
- Number: 16

Senior career*
Years	Team	Apps	(Gls)
2017–2018	FH	24	(1)
2019	Stjarnan	15	(1)
2020	Valur	11	(1)
2021–2022	Häcken	20	(6)
2022–2023	Norrköping	23	(5)
2023–2025	OH Leuven	27	(23)
2025–	Brann	0	(0)

International career^{‡}
2018	Iceland U-17	5	(1)
2022–	Iceland	29	(4)
- * Club domestic league appearances and goals ‡ National team caps and goals as of 15 October 2026

Diljá Ýr Zomers (born 11 November 2001) is an Icelandic footballer who plays as a midfielder, winger, or striker for Brann.

== Club career ==
In 2022, Diljá signed for Swedish side Norrköping. She was described as a "player that [manager] Tor-Arne Fredheim holds in high regard" while playing for the club. In 2023, she signed for Belgian side OH Leuven. She scored six goals in her first four appearances for the club.

== International career ==
On 13 June 2025, Diljá was called up to the Iceland squad for the UEFA Women's Euro 2025.

=== International goals ===
No.	Date	Venue	Opponent	Score	Result	Competition
1.	1 December 2023	Cardiff City Stadium, Cardiff, Wales	Wales	2–0	2–1	2023–24 UEFA Women's Nations League
2.	5 April 2024	Kópavogsvöllur, Kópavogur, Iceland	Poland	2–0	3–0	UEFA Women's Euro 2025 qualifying
3.	13 October 2026	Laugardalsvöllur, Reykjavík, Iceland	Croatia	4–0	5–0	2027 FIFA Women's World Cup qualification play-offs
4.	13 October 2026	Laugardalsvöllur, Reykjavík, Iceland	Croatia	5–0	5–0	2027 FIFA Women's World Cup qualification play-offs

== Personal life ==
Diljá was born in 2001 in Iceland.
