= Eileen Campbell =

Austrian footballer (born 2000)

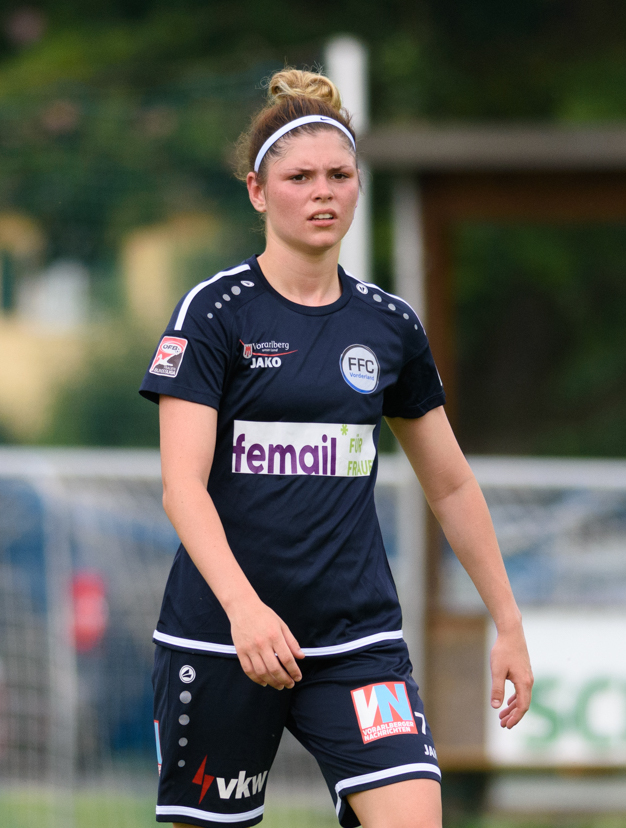
- Campbell in 2020

Personal information
- Full name: Eileen Michelle Campbell
- Date of birth: 17 September 2000 (age 26)
- Place of birth: Feldkirch, Vorarlberg, Austria
- Height: 1.65 m (5 ft 5 in)
- Position: Forward

Team information
- Current team: 1. FC Union Berlin
- Number: 10

Youth career
- 2008–2013: SC Tisis
- 2013: FC Sulz
- 2013–2015: FC Blau-Weiß Feldkirch

Senior career*
Years	Team	Apps	(Gls)
2015	FC Blau-Weiß Feldkirch		
2015–2019	FC Rot-Weiß Rankweil		
2019–2024	SPG SCR Altach/FFC Vorderland	67	(35)
2024–2025	SC Freiburg	23	(5)
2025–	1. FC Union Berlin	34	(8)

International career^{‡}
2018	Austria U19	2	(0)
2022–	Austria	34	(10)
- * Club domestic league appearances and goals as of 20 November 2026 ‡ National team caps and goals as of 14 October 2026

Eileen Michelle Campbell (born 17 September 2000) is an Austrian professional footballer who plays as a forward for Frauen-Bundesliga side 1. FC Union Berlin and the Austria national team. She previously played for ÖFB Frauen Bundesliga club SPG SCR Altach/FFC Vorderland and SC Freiburg.

== Early life ==
Campbell was born in Feldkirch, Vorarlberg to a Northern Irish mother and a father from Vorarlberg. She began playing football at SC Tisis at the age of 8. For years, as late as the U16 team at FC Blau-Weiß Feldkirch, she played in boys' teams as the only girl. In 2018 she earned her Matura at the Gymnasium Mehrerau in Bregenz.

== Club career ==
In summer 2015 Campbell had a trial with Frauen-Bundesliga club SC Freiburg and moved to FC Rot-Weiß Rankweil of the Austrian second tier.

In 2019, Campbell joined ÖFB Frauen Bundesliga side SPG SCR Altach/FFC Vorderland, then called FFC Vorderland. After the 2022–23 season, during which she scored 15 goals in 17 appearances, she earned the award of the best female footballer of the season in Austria, becoming the first person from Vorarlberg to achieve this feat.

In November 2023 it was announced that Campbell would join Frauen-Bundesliga club SC Freiburg in January 2024.

She went to Bundesliga newcomer 1. FC Union Berlin in summer 2025.

== International career ==
Born to a Northern Irish mother, Campbell only had British citizenship until 2015 when she was called up to the Austria U17 national team and obtained an Austrian passport. For the Austria U19 she played in two matches. She made her debut for the senior national team on 15 November 2022, in a 3–0 win in a friendly against Slovakia.

== Outside football ==
As of October 2023 Campbell was working 42 hours per week at a law firm in Liechtenstein.

== Career statistics ==
Scores and results list Austria's goal tally first, score column indicates score after each Campbell goal.

List of international goals scored by Eileen Campbell
No.	Date	Venue	Opponent	Score	Result	Competition
1	17 February 2023	Gozo Stadium, Gozo, Malta	Netherlands	1–1	2–1	Friendly
2	22 September 2023	Ullevaal Stadion, Oslo, Norway	Norway	1–1	1–1	2023–24 UEFA Women's Nations League
3	31 October 2023	Estádio do Varzim, Póvoa do Varzim, Portugal	Portugal	2–1	2–1	2023–24 UEFA Women's Nations League
4	5 December 2023	NV Arena, Sankt Pölten, Austria	Norway	1–0	2–1	2023–24 UEFA Women's Nations League
5	5 April 2024	Raiffeisen Arena, Linz, Austria	Germany	1–0	2–3	UEFA Women's Euro 2025 qualifying
6	5 April 2024	Raiffeisen Arena, Linz, Austria	Germany	2–0	2–3	UEFA Women's Euro 2025 qualifying
7	9 April 2024	Stadion Miejski w Gdyni, Gdynia, Poland	Poland	3–1	3–1	UEFA Women's Euro 2025 qualifying
8	4 June 2024	Laugardalsvöllur, Reykjavík, Iceland	Iceland	1–1	1–2	UEFA Women's Euro 2025 qualifying
10	13 October 2026	Sportclub-Platz Dornbach, Vienna, Austria	Kosovo	4–0	4–0	2027 FIFA Women's World Cup qualification
