= Gustav Långbacka =

Finnish footballer (born 1984)

Personal information
- Date of birth: 8 May 1984 (age 42)
- Place of birth: Kokkola, Finland
- Height: 1.93 m (6 ft 4 in)
- Position: Goalkeeper

Senior career*
| Years | Team | Apps | (Gls) |
| 2005–2007 | GBK | 44 | (0) |
| 2008 | KPV | 13 | (0) |
| 2009–2011 | IFK Mariehamn | 37 | (0) |
| 2010 | → SIFFK (loan) | 1 | (0) |
| 2012–2015 | Ilves | 38 | (0) |
| 2014 | → Ilves-Kissat (loan) | 1 | (0) |
- * Club domestic league appearances and goals

Gustav Långbacka (born 8 May 1984) is a Finnish football goalkeeper who played in the Veikkausliiga for IFK Mariehamn.

Långbacka's sister is the football referee Lina Lehtovaara.
