= Frederikke Thøgersen =

Danish footballer (born 1995)

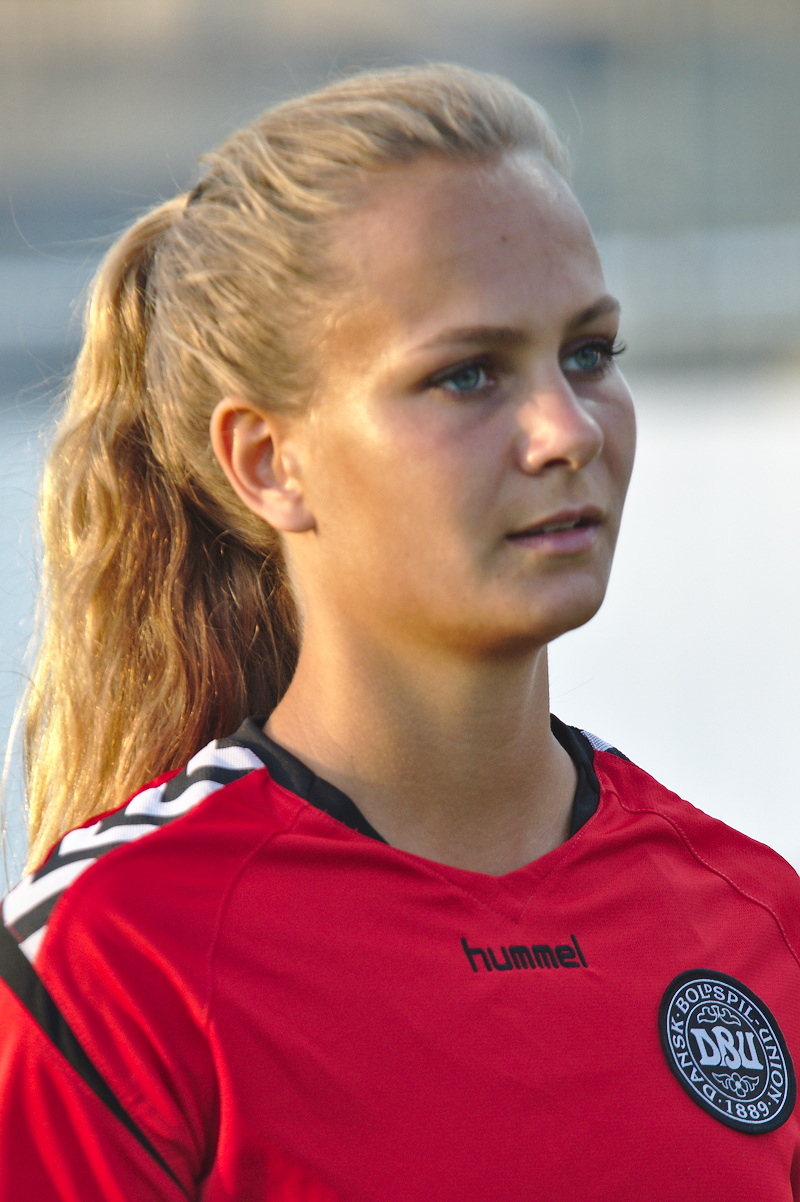
- Frederikke Thøgersen playing for Denmark in July 2017

Personal information
- Full name: Frederikke Skøjdt Thøgersen
- Date of birth: 24 July 1995 (age 31)
- Place of birth: Thisted, Denmark
- Height: 1.63 m (5 ft 4 in)
- Position: Midfielder

Team information
- Current team: AS Roma
- Number: 23

Senior career*
| Years | Team | Apps | (Gls) |
| 2013 | Thisted FC | | |
| 2013–2019 | Fortuna Hjørring | 69 | (6) |
| 2019–2021 | Fiorentina | 36 | (2) |
| 2021–2022 | Rosengård | 6 | (0) |
| 2023–2024 | Inter Milan | 23 | (0) |
| 2024– | AS Roma | 26 | (1) |

International career^{‡}
| 2011–13 | Denmark U16 | 6 | (2) |
| 2011–12 | Denmark U17 | 16 | (1) |
| 2012–14 | Denmark U19 | 23 | (2) |
| 2016 | Denmark U23 | 1 | (1) |
| 2014– | Denmark | 76 | (3) |
Medal record
Women's football
Representing Denmark
UEFA Women's Championship
| Silver medal – second place | 2017 Netherlands | Team |
- * Club domestic league appearances and goals as of 15 July 2025 ‡ National team caps and goals as of 15 July 2025

Frederikke Skjødt Thøgersen (Danish: [fʁæˈdeʁkə ɕœt ˈtøːɡɐsən]; born 24 July 1995) is a Danish professional football player who plays as a midfielder for the Italian Serie A team AS Roma and the Danish national team.

Thøgersen has played in Denmark, Italy and Sweden, and was part of the Denmark squads at the 2023 FIFA Women's World Cup and the UEFA Women's Euro 2025.

== Club career ==
Thøgersen played six seasons with Fortuna Hjørring after moving from her hometown team Thisted FC in 2013. In total she won three league titles and two cups with Hjørring.

In May 2019, Thøgersen signed a two-year contract with Serie A team Fiorentina, her first overseas club.

On 21 July 2021, Thøgersen was announced at Rosengård on a two-year contract.

On 21 January 2023, Thøgersen was announced at Inter Milan on a one and half year contract.

On 11 July 2024, Thøgersen was announced at AS Roma on a two-year contract.

== International career ==
Thøgersen has represented Denmark at multiple youth levels, winning a bronze medal at the 2012 UEFA Women's Under-17 Championship.

Thøgersen made her senior international debut for Denmark on 5 March 2014 in as a 74th-minute substitute during a 2–0 defeat to Sweden at the Algarve Cup. She has since competed at the 2016 and 2017 editions. In 2017, she was part of the Denmark squad that finished second at the UEFA Women's Championship, losing to the host nation Netherlands in the final.

On 30 June 2023, Thøgersen was called up to the 23-player Danish squad for the 2023 FIFA Women's World Cup.

On 20 June 2025, Thøgersen was called up to the Danish squad for the UEFA Women's Euro 2025.

== Personal life ==
Thøgersen has been in a relationship with Vendsyssel FF defender Søren Henriksen since January 2018.

== Honours ==
Fortuna Hjørring

- Elitedivisionen: 2013–14, 2015–16, 2017–18
- Danish Cup: 2015–16, 2018–19

AS Roma

- Supercoppa Italiana: 2024

Denmark

- UEFA Women's Championship runner-up: 2017
- UEFA Women's Under-17 Championship third-place: 2012

== International goals ==
Scores and results list Denmark's goal tally first.

| No. | Date | Venue | Opponent | Score | Result | Competition |
|---|---|---|---|---|---|---|
| 1. | 2 March 2018 | VRS António Sports Complex, Vila Real de Santo António, Portugal | Netherlands | 2–1 | 2–3 | 2018 Algarve Cup |
| 2. | 26 September 2023 | Cardiff City Stadium, Cardiff, Wales | Wales | 3–1 | 5–1 | 2023–24 UEFA Women's Nations League |
| 3. | 9 April 2024 | Viborg Stadium, Viborg, Denmark | Belgium | 4–0 | 4–2 | UEFA Women's Euro 2025 qualifying |
