= Jassina Blom =

Belgian footballer

Personal information
- Date of birth: 3 September 1994 (age 32)
- Place of birth: Belgium
- Height: 1.70 m (5 ft 7 in)
- Position: Forward

Team information
- Current team: Sevilla FC
- Number: 14

Youth career
- Eendracht Belzele
- Cercle Melle
- Evergem Center
- Olympia Gent
- Gent

Senior career*
Years	Team	Apps	(Gls)
2013–2014	Gent	27	(7)
2014–2015	Club Brugge	22	(0)
2015–2016	Eva's Tienen	3	(3)
2016–2017	Heerenveen	26	(10)
2017–2019	Twente	42	(8)
2019–2020	Gent	12	(6)
2020–2021	PEC Zwolle	19	(4)
2021–2025	Tenerife	108	(24)
2025–	Sevilla FC	0	(0)

International career^{‡}
2014–	Belgium	41	(11)
- * Club domestic league appearances and goals as of 5 June 2025 ‡ National team caps and goals as of 5 June 2025

Jassina Blom (born September 3, 1994) is a Belgian professional footballer who plays as a forward for Liga F club Sevilla FC and for the Belgium women's national football team. She is known for her physical strength, scoring instincts and her ability to play multiple attacking roles. Blom has built a rich club career in Belgium, the Netherlands and Spain and has represented her country internationally since 2014.

== Club career ==
Blom began her professional football career in the 2013–14 season with KAA Gent Ladies. In the 2014–15 season, she signed with Club Brugge. She played for Eva's Tienen during the 2015–16 season.

In 2017, she made the switch to the Dutch Eredivisie, signing with SC Heerenveen. Later that same year, she transferred to FC Twente, where her contract was extended after one season. In her second season, she scored the winning goal that secured the national championship for Twente. After two seasons with FC Twente, she returned to her former club KAA Gent Ladies. At the end of that season, she transferred to PEC Zwolle, signing a two-year contract.

After one season in Zwolle, she was transferred to Spanish club UD Granadilla Tenerife, a club competing in Spain's highest women's football division, the Primera División Femenina. With this transfer, she made history in two ways: she became the first Belgian female footballer to play in the Spanish Primera División Femenina and the first player for whom PEC Zwolle received a transfer fee.

After two seasons with Tenerife, Blom extended her contract for another two years. In 2025, her four-season spell at the club came to an end.

== International career ==
Blom made her debut for the Belgium national team on 22 November 2014, coming on as a substitute for Tine De Caigny against Poland.

At the start of 2022, Blom helped Belgium win the Pinatar Cup in Spain for the first time, beating Russia on penalties in the final after a 0–0 draw.

Missing out on the Belgium squad for UEFA Women's Euro 2022 in England, where the Red Flames were beaten in the quarter-finals 1–0 by Sweden, she went on to contribute to Belgium's successful qualification for UEFA Women's Euro 2025 via the play-offs, winning the play-off final against Ukraine.

On 11 June 2025, Blom was called up to the Belgium squad for the UEFA Women's Euro 2025.

== Career statistics ==
=== International ===
As of match played 26 October 2021

List of international goals scored by Jassina Blom
No.	Date	Venue	Opponent	Score	Result	Competition
1	11 April 2017	Den Dreef, Leuven, Belgium	Scotland	4–0	5–0	Friendly
2	11 April 2017	Den Dreef, Leuven, Belgium	Scotland	5–0	5–0	Friendly
3	12 June 2021	Stade Am Pëtz, Wiltz, Luxembourg	Luxembourg	0–1	0–1	Friendly
4	21 September 2021	King Baudouin Stadium, Brussels, Belgium	Albania	4–0	7–0	2023 FIFA Women's World Cup qualification
5	21 September 2021	King Baudouin Stadium, Brussels, Belgium	Albania	5–0	7–0	2023 FIFA Women's World Cup qualification
6	21 September 2021	King Baudouin Stadium, Brussels, Belgium	Albania	7–0	7–0	2023 FIFA Women's World Cup qualification
7	7 April 2022	Elbasan Arena, Elbasan, Albania	Albania	5–0	5–0	2023 FIFA Women's World Cup qualification
8	7 April 2023	Stadion Wiener Neustadt, Wiener Neustadt, Austria	Austria	2–0	2–3	Friendly
9	22 September 2023	Den Dreef, Leuven, Belgium	Netherlands	2–1	2–1	2023–24 UEFA Women's Nations League
10	4 June 2024	Stayen, Sint-Truiden, Belgium	Czech Republic	1–1	1–1	UEFA Women's Euro 2025 qualifying

== Honours ==
Belgium

- Pinatar Cup: 2022
