= Michela Cambiaghi =

Italian footballer (born 1996)

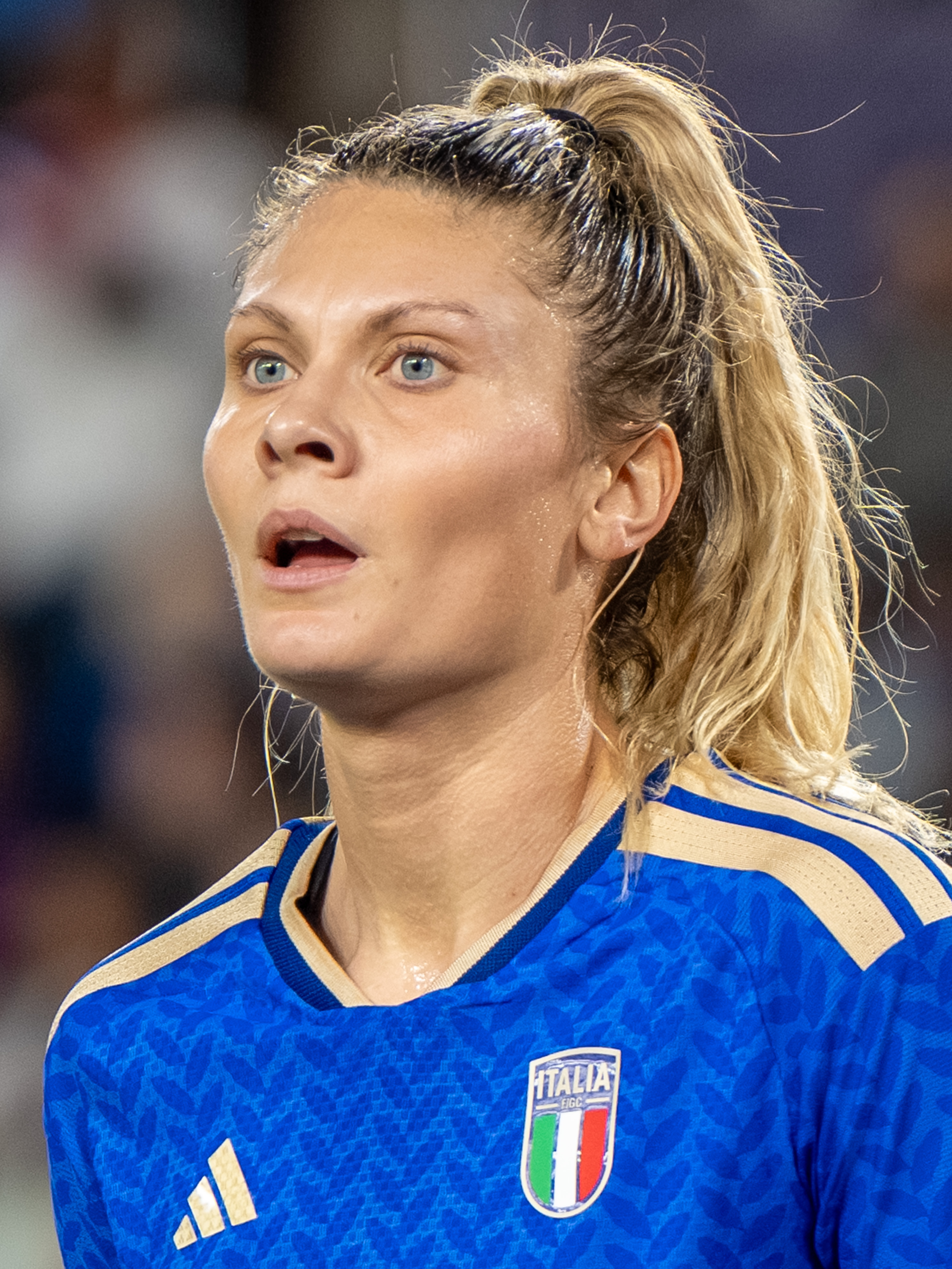
- Cambiaghi with Italy in 2025

Personal information
- Date of birth: 4 February 1996 (age 30)
- Place of birth: Vimercate, Italy
- Height: 1.78 m (5 ft 10 in)
- Position: Forward

Team information
- Current team: Inter Milan
- Number: 36

Senior career*
Years	Team	Apps	(Gls)
2012–2013	Fiammamonza	25	(4)
2013–2016	Atalanta	60	(18)
2016–2017	Como	21	(5)
2018	Atalanta	8	(0)
2018–2022	Sassuolo	55	(17)
2022–2023	Parma	24	(5)
2023–2025	Inter Milan	42	(12)
2025–2026	Juventus	17	(3)
2026–	Inter Milan	0	(0)

International career
2023–	Italy	26	(5)
- * Club domestic league appearances and goals

Michela Cambiaghi (born 4 February 1996) is an Italian professional footballer who plays as a forward for Serie A club Inter Milan and the Italy national team.

== Club career ==
=== Juventus ===
On 20 June 2025, Cambiaghi signed a three-year contract with Juventus.

== International career ==
On 25 June 2025, Cambiaghi was called up to the Italy squad for the UEFA Women's Euro 2025.

=== International statistics ===
As of match played 8 April 2025

Appearances and goals by national team and year
National team	Year	Apps	Goals
Italy	2023	4	1
Italy	2024	7	2
Italy	2025	6	2
Total		17	5

=== International goals ===
No.	Date	Venue	Opponent	Score	Result	Competition
1.	1 December 2023	Estadio Municipal de Pasarón, Pontevedra, Spain	Spain	2–1	3–2	2023–24 UEFA Women's Nations League
2.	27 February 2024	Estadio Nuevo Mirador, Algeciras, Spain	England	1–3	1–5	Friendly
3.	16 July 2024	Stadio Druso, Bolzano, Italy	Finland	3–0	4–0	UEFA Women's Euro 2025 qualifying
4.	25 February 2025	Stadio Alberto Picco, La Spezia, Italy	Denmark	1–1	1–3	2025 UEFA Women's Nations League
5.	4 April 2025	Strawberry Arena, Solna, Sweden	Sweden	2–2	2–3	2025 UEFA Women's Nations League
