= UEFA Women's Euro 2025 qualifying =

Tournament details
- Dates: 5 April 2024 – 3 December 2024
- Teams: 51 (from 1 confederation)

Tournament statistics
- Matches played: 191
- Goals scored: 576 (3.02 per match)
- Attendance: 906,199 (4,744 per match)
- Top scorer(s): (Slovenia) Lara Prašnikar (9 goals)
- Women's Nations League Women's Euro qualifying

The UEFA Women's Euro 2025 qualifying competition was a women's football competition that determined the 15 teams joining the automatically qualified host Switzerland in the UEFA Women's Euro 2025 final tournament.

== Format ==
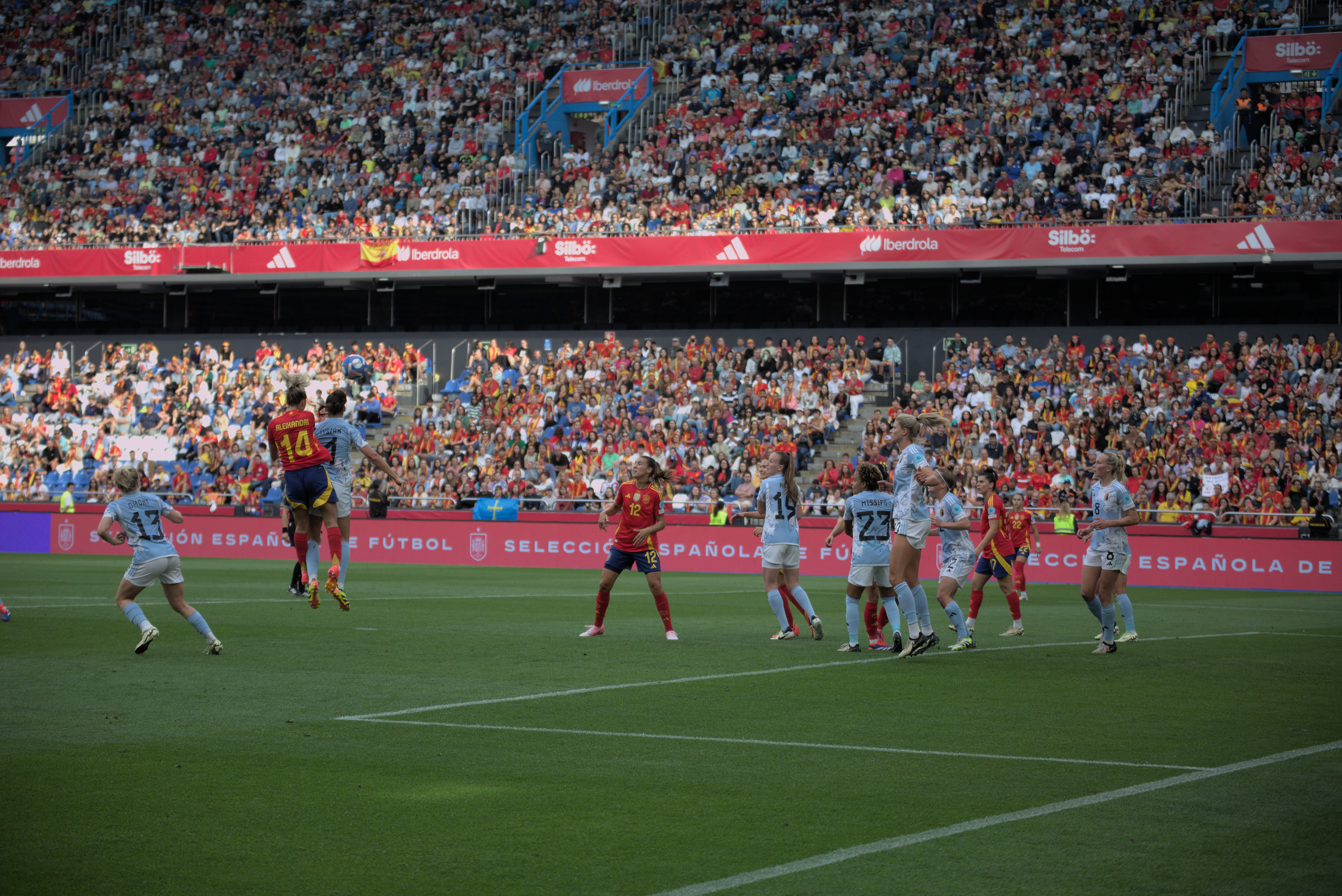
Spain–Belgium match.

The European Qualifiers started on 5 April 2024, following the conclusion of the 2023–24 Women's Nations League. The qualifiers were composed of a league stage and final tournament play-offs.

The league stage was played in the same format as the UEFA Women's Nations League, with teams split into three leagues: League A with 16 teams, League B with 16 teams and League C with 19 teams. Each team's starting league position was determined based on the results of the preceding Women's Nations League. In February 2024, promotion/relegation matches were played to determine the final composition of each league.

Again, teams competed in groups of four (Leagues A and B) and four or three teams (League C) and over six matchdays, with each team playing one home match and one away match against all the other teams in their group.

The goals for this competition were: to qualify for the UEFA Women's Euro 2025; and to be positioned as high as possible for the upcoming 2025 UEFA Women's Nations League.

The European Qualifiers ranking at the end of the league stage determined three main outcomes:

- Who qualified directly for Euro 2025;
- Who went into the play-offs for Euro 2025;
- The composition of the leagues for the upcoming Nations League.

For Euro 2025 qualification:

- the top two teams in each League A group qualified directly for the finals alongside hosts Switzerland;
- the remaining seven spots were decided by two rounds of play-offs in October to December 2024.

Promotion and relegation took place prior to the upcoming 2025 UEFA Women's Nations League but had no effect on qualification for the play-offs for Euro 2025:

- The four group winners in League B were promoted to League A;
- The four fourth-placed teams in League A were relegated to League B;
- The five group winners in League C were promoted to League B;
- The four fourth-placed teams, plus the lowest-ranked third-placed team in League B, were relegated to League C;
- All other teams stayed in the same league.

Qualification for the 2027 Women's World Cup will work in the same way, except that only the group winners of League A will qualify directly.

== Tiebreakers ==
=== Tiebreakers for group ranking ===
If two or more teams in the same group were equal on points on completion of the league phase, the following tie-breaking criteria were applied:

1. Higher number of points obtained in the matches played among the teams in question;
2. Higher goal difference in matches played among the teams in question;
3. Higher number of goals scored in the matches played among the teams in question;
4. If, after having applied criteria 1 to 3, teams still have an equal ranking, criteria 1 to 3 are reapplied exclusively to the matches between the teams in question to determine their final rankings. (Note: When there are two or more teams tied on points, criteria 1 to 3 are applied. After these criteria are applied, they may define the position of some of the teams involved, but not all of them. For example, if there is a three-way tie on points, the application of the first three criteria may only break the tie for one of the teams, leaving the other two teams still tied. In this case, the tiebreaking procedure is resumed, from the beginning, for those teams that are still tied.) If this procedure does not lead to a decision, criteria 5 to 11 apply;
5. Higher goal difference in all group matches;
6. Higher number of goals scored in all group matches;
7. Higher number of away goals scored in all group matches;
8. Higher number of wins in all group matches;
9. Higher number of away wins in all group matches;
10. Lower disciplinary points total in all group matches (1 point for a single yellow card, 3 points for a red card as a consequence of two yellow cards, 3 points for a direct red card, 4 points for a yellow card followed by a direct red card).
11. Position in the 2024–25 Women's European Qualifiers access list.

=== Criteria for league ranking ===
Individual league rankings were established according to the following criteria:

1. Position in the group;
2. Higher number of points;
3. Higher goal difference;
4. Higher number of goals scored;
5. Higher number of goals scored away from home;
6. Higher number of wins;
7. Higher number of wins away from home;
8. Lower disciplinary points total (1 point for a single yellow card, 3 points for a red card as a consequence of two yellow cards, 3 points for a direct red card, 4 points for a yellow card followed by a direct red card).
9. Position in the 2024–25 Women's European Qualifiers access list

In order to rank teams in League C, which was composed of different sized groups, the results against the fourth-placed teams were not taken into account when comparing teams placed first, second, and third in their respective groups.

=== Criteria for overall ranking ===
The overall UEFA Nations League rankings were established as follows:

1. The 16 League A teams were ranked 1st to 16th according to their league rankings.
2. The 16 League B teams were ranked 17th to 32nd according to their league rankings.
3. The League C teams were ranked 33rd onwards according to their league rankings.

== Seeding ==
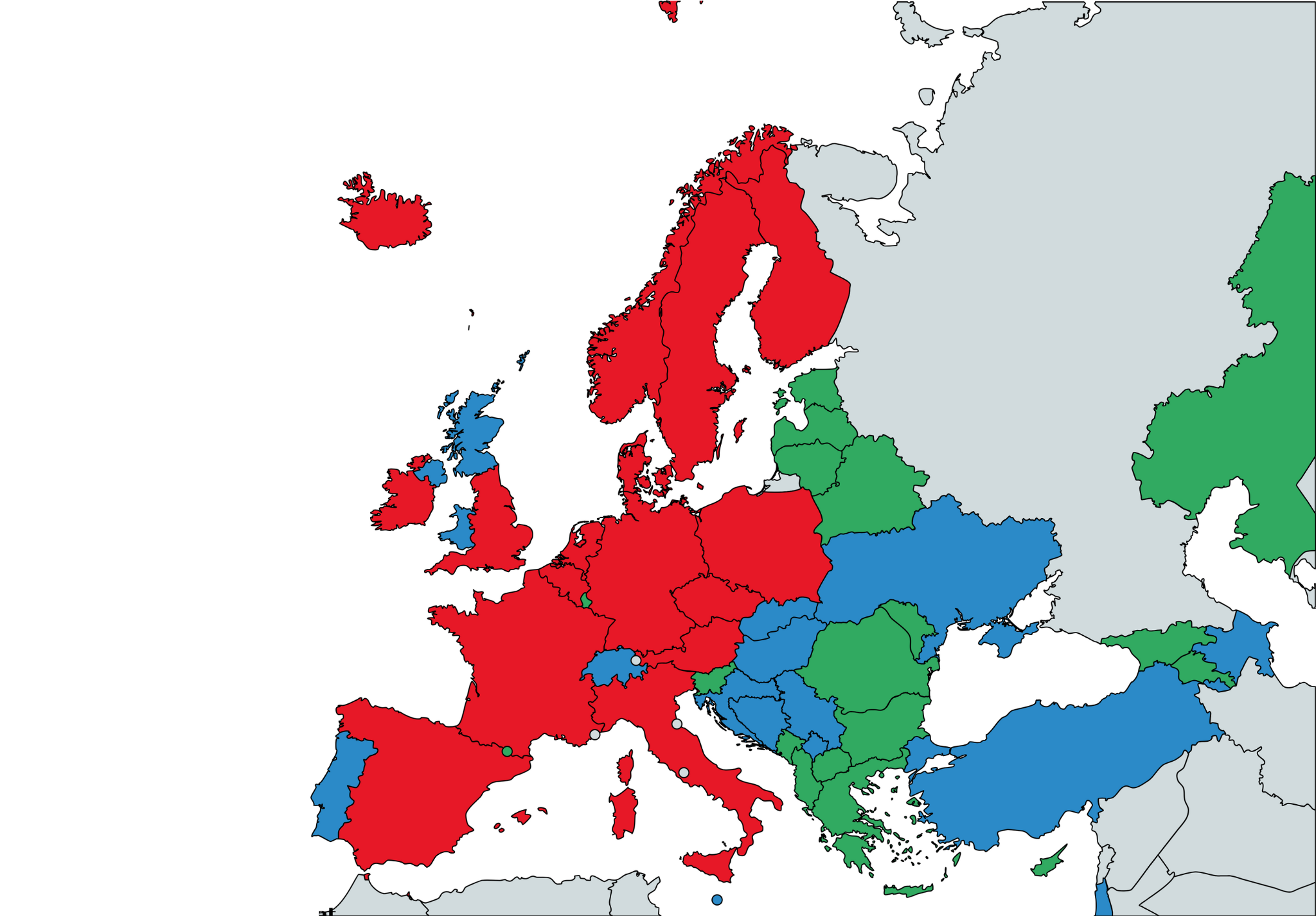
Teams league positions: League A League B League C

All 55 UEFA national teams were able to submit an entry for the competition by 23 March 2023 at the latest. This involved participation in the qualifying competition for Euro 2025 as well as the preceding 2023–24 UEFA Women's Nations League.

In total, 51 teams entered the qualifying competition. Russia were not permitted to enter the competition due to them being suspended because of the Russian invasion of Ukraine. In addition, Gibraltar, Liechtenstein and San Marino did not submit an entry.

Teams were split into leagues based on the overall ranking and on the promotion/relegation matches from the 2023–24 Women's Nations League competition.

Teams were divided into four pots of four in Leagues A and B, and three pots of five and one pot of four in League C. The seedings, pots, and draw procedure were confirmed by UEFA on 1 March 2024.

Key
▲	Promoted after 2023–24 Women's Nations League
▼	Relegated after 2023–24 Women's Nations League
*	Participated in promotion/relegation play-offs

League A
Pot	Team	Prv	Rank
1	Spain		1
1	France		2
1	Germany		3
1	Netherlands		4
2	England		5
2	Denmark		6
2	Italy		7
2	Austria		8
3	Iceland (Note: Belgium, Bosnia and Herzegovina, Croatia, Hungary, Iceland, Norway, Serbia, and Sweden participated in the League A vs League B promotion/relegation matches in February 2024 to determine each team's league allocation.)	*	9
3	Belgium	*	10
3	Sweden	*	11
3	Norway	*	12
4	Republic of Ireland	▲	17
4	Finland	▲	18
4	Poland	▲	19
4	Czech Republic	▲	20

League B
Pot	Team	Prv	Rank
1	Portugal	▼	13
1	Switzerland	▼	14
1	Scotland	▼	15
1	Wales	▼	16
2	Bosnia and Herzegovina	*	21
2	Serbia	*	22
2	Croatia	*	23
2	Hungary	*	24
3	Slovakia (Note: Bulgaria, Latvia, Montenegro, Northern Ireland, Slovakia, and Ukraine participated in the League B vs League C promotion/relegation matches in February 2024 to determine each team's league allocation.)	*	25
3	Northern Ireland	*	26
3	Ukraine	*	27
3	Turkey	▲	33
4	Malta	▲	34
4	Israel	▲	35
4	Kosovo	▲	36
4	Azerbaijan	▲	37

League C
Pot	Team	Prv	Rank
1	Slovenia	▼	28
1	Greece	▼	29
1	Belarus	▼	30
1	Romania	▼	31
1	Albania	▼	32
2	Latvia	*	38
2	Montenegro	*	39
2	Bulgaria	*	40
2	Estonia		41
2	Lithuania		42
3	Luxembourg		43
3	Kazakhstan		44
3	North Macedonia		45
3	Cyprus		46
3	Andorra		47
4	Georgia		48
4	Moldova		49
4	Faroe Islands		50
4	Armenia		51

=== Draw ===
The draw for the UEFA Women's European Qualifiers took place in Nyon, Switzerland on 5 March 2024 at 13:00 CET. For political reasons, Kosovo could not be drawn into the same group as either Bosnia and Herzegovina or Serbia. In addition, the teams in League C that previously played in three-team groups in the 2023–24 Women's Nations League (Bulgaria and North Macedonia), were drawn into four-team groups for this competition.

== Schedule ==
Below is the schedule of the UEFA Women's European Qualifiers 2025 campaign.

Stage	Draw date	Matchday	Dates
Qualifying group stage	5 March 2024	Matchday 1 & 2	5–9 April 2024
Qualifying group stage	5 March 2024	Matchday 3 & 4	31 May – 4 June 2024
Qualifying group stage	5 March 2024	Matchday 5 & 6	12–16 July 2024
Play-offs	19 July 2024	Round 1	25–29 October 2024
Play-offs	19 July 2024	Round 2	27 November–3 December 2024

== League A ==
=== Group A1 ===
Pos	Team	Pld	W	D	L	GF	GA	GD	Pts	Qualification	(Italy)	(Netherlands)	(Norway)	(Finland)
1	Italy	6	2	3	1	8	3	+5	9 (Note: Head-to-head points: Italy 4, Netherlands 1.)	Qualify for final tournament	—	2–0	1–1	4–0
2	Netherlands	6	2	3	1	4	4	0	9	Qualify for final tournament	0–0	—	1–0	1–0
3	Norway	6	1	4	1	7	4	+3	7	Advance to play-offs (seeded)	0–0	1–1	—	4–0
4	Finland (R)	6	1	2	3	4	12	−8	5	Advance to play-offs (seeded) and relegation to League B	2–1	1–1	1–1	—

Source: UEFA
(R) Relegated

=== Group A2 ===
Pos	Team	Pld	W	D	L	GF	GA	GD	Pts	Qualification	(Spain)	(Denmark)	(Belgium)	(Czech Republic)
1	Spain	6	5	0	1	18	5	+13	15	Qualify for final tournament	—	3–2	2–0	3–1
2	Denmark	6	4	0	2	14	8	+6	12	Qualify for final tournament	0–2	—	4–2	2–0
3	Belgium	6	1	1	4	5	18	−13	4 (Note: Head-to-head points: Belgium 4, Czech Republic 1.)	Advance to play-offs (seeded)	0–7	0–3	—	1–1
4	Czech Republic (R)	6	1	1	4	6	12	−6	4	Advance to play-offs (seeded) and relegation to League B	2–1	1–3	1–2	—

Source: UEFA
(R) Relegated

=== Group A3 ===
Pos	Team	Pld	W	D	L	GF	GA	GD	Pts	Qualification	(France)	(England)	(Sweden)	(Republic of Ireland)
1	France	6	4	0	2	8	7	+1	12	Qualify for final tournament	—	1–2	2–1	1–0
2	England	6	3	2	1	8	5	+3	11	Qualify for final tournament	1–2	—	1–1	2–1
3	Sweden	6	2	2	2	6	4	+2	8	Advance to play-offs (seeded)	0–1	0–0	—	1–0
4	Republic of Ireland (R)	6	1	0	5	4	10	−6	3	Advance to play-offs (seeded) and relegation to League B	3–1	0–2	0–3	—

Source: UEFA
(R) Relegated

=== Group A4 ===
Pos	Team	Pld	W	D	L	GF	GA	GD	Pts	Qualification	(Germany)	(Iceland)	(Austria)	(Poland)
1	Germany	6	5	0	1	17	8	+9	15	Qualify for final tournament	—	3–1	4–0	4–1
2	Iceland	6	4	1	1	11	5	+6	13	Qualify for final tournament	3–0	—	2–1	3–0
3	Austria	6	2	1	3	10	12	−2	7	Advance to play-offs (seeded)	2–3	1–1	—	3–1
4	Poland (R)	6	0	0	6	4	17	−13	0	Advance to play-offs (seeded) and relegation to League B	1–3	0–1	1–3	—

Source: UEFA
(R) Relegated

== League B ==
=== Group B1 ===
Pos	Team	Pld	W	D	L	GF	GA	GD	Pts	Qualification	(Switzerland)	(Turkey)	(Hungary)	(Azerbaijan)
1	Switzerland (H, P)	6	5	0	1	14	3	+11	15	Qualify for final tournament as host and promotion to League A	—	3–1	2–1	3–0
2	Turkey	6	3	0	3	8	8	0	9	Advance to play-offs	0–2	—	2–1	1–0
3	Hungary	6	2	1	3	10	9	+1	7	Advance to play-offs	1–0	1–4	—	1–1
4	Azerbaijan (R)	6	1	1	4	2	14	−12	4	Relegation to League C and advance to play-offs (Note: Since Switzerland (who qualified as hosts) finished in the top three places in their group, the best-ranked fourth-placed team qualified for the play-offs.)	0–4	1–0	0–5	—

Source: UEFA
(H) Hosts of final tournament; (P) Promoted; (R) Relegated

=== Group B2 ===
Pos	Team	Pld	W	D	L	GF	GA	GD	Pts	Qualification	(Scotland)	(Serbia)	(Slovakia)	(Israel)
1	Scotland (P)	6	5	1	0	13	1	+12	16	Advance to play-offs and promotion to League A	—	1–0	1–0	4–1
2	Serbia	6	4	1	1	11	4	+7	13	Advance to play-offs	0–0	—	2–1	1–0
3	Slovakia (R)	6	1	1	4	5	11	−6	4	Advance to play-offs and relegation to League C (Note: The lowest-ranked third-placed team was relegated along with the four last-placed teams.)	0–2	0–4	—	2–0
4	Israel (R)	6	0	1	5	5	18	−13	1	Relegation to League C	0–5	2–4	2–2	—

Source: UEFA
(P) Promoted; (R) Relegated

=== Group B3 ===
Pos	Team	Pld	W	D	L	GF	GA	GD	Pts	Qualification	(Portugal)	(Northern Ireland)	(Bosnia and Herzegovina)	(Malta)
1	Portugal (P)	6	5	1	0	14	2	+12	16	Advance to play-offs and promotion to League A	—	4–0	3–0	3–1
2	Northern Ireland	6	3	1	2	8	7	+1	10	Advance to play-offs	1–2	—	2–0	0–0
3	Bosnia and Herzegovina	6	2	1	3	4	9	−5	7	Advance to play-offs	0–0	1–3	—	2–1
4	Malta (R)	6	0	1	5	2	10	−8	1	Relegation to League C	0–2	0–2	0–1	—

Source: UEFA
(P) Promoted; (R) Relegated

=== Group B4 ===
Pos	Team	Pld	W	D	L	GF	GA	GD	Pts	Qualification	(Wales)	(Ukraine)	(Croatia)	(Kosovo)
1	Wales (P)	6	4	2	0	18	3	+15	14	Advance to play-offs and promotion to League A	—	1–1	4–0	2–0
2	Ukraine	6	3	2	1	11	4	+7	11	Advance to play-offs	2–2	—	2–0	2–0
3	Croatia	6	3	0	3	4	9	−5	9	Advance to play-offs	0–3	1–0	—	2–0
4	Kosovo (R)	6	0	0	6	0	17	−17	0	Relegation to League C	0–6	0–4	0–1	—

Source: UEFA
(P) Promoted; (R) Relegated

=== Qualification for play-offs ===
Rnk	Grp	Team	Pld	W	D	L	GF	GA	GD	Pts	Qualification
17	B3	Portugal	6	5	1	0	14	2	+12	16	Advance to play-offs (seeded)
18	B2	Scotland	6	5	1	0	13	1	+12	16	Advance to play-offs (seeded)
19	B1	Switzerland (H)	6	5	0	1	14	3	+11	15	Qualify for final tournament as host
20	B4	Wales	6	4	2	0	18	3	+15	14	Advance to play-offs (seeded)
21	B2	Serbia	6	4	1	1	11	4	+7	13	Advance to play-offs (seeded)
22	B4	Ukraine	6	3	2	1	11	4	+7	11	Advance to play-offs (seeded)
23	B3	Northern Ireland	6	3	1	2	8	7	+1	10	Advance to play-offs (seeded)
24	B1	Turkey	6	3	0	3	8	8	0	9	Advance to play-offs (unseeded)
25	B4	Croatia	6	3	0	3	4	9	−5	9	Advance to play-offs (unseeded)
26	B1	Hungary	6	2	1	3	10	9	+1	7	Advance to play-offs (unseeded)
27	B3	Bosnia and Herzegovina	6	2	1	3	4	9	−5	7	Advance to play-offs (unseeded)
28	B2	Slovakia	6	1	1	4	5	11	−6	4	Advance to play-offs (unseeded)
29	B1	Azerbaijan	6	1	1	4	2	14	−12	4	Advance to play-offs (unseeded)
30	B3	Malta	6	0	1	5	2	10	−8	1	
31	B2	Israel	6	0	1	5	5	18	−13	1	
32	B4	Kosovo	6	0	0	6	0	17	−17	0	

Source: UEFA
(H) Hosts of final tournament

=== Ranking of third-placed teams ===
Rnk	Grp	Team	Pld	W	D	L	GF	GA	GD	Pts	Promotion or relegation
25	B4	Croatia	6	3	0	3	4	9	−5	9	
26	B1	Hungary	6	2	1	3	10	9	+1	7	
27	B3	Bosnia and Herzegovina	6	2	1	3	4	9	−5	7	
28	B2	Slovakia	6	1	1	4	5	11	−6	4	Relegation to League C

Source: UEFA

== League C ==
=== Group C1 ===
Pos	Team	Pld	W	D	L	GF	GA	GD	Pts	Qualification	(Belarus)	(Georgia (country))	(Lithuania)	(Cyprus)
1	Belarus (P)	6	6	0	0	19	0	+19	18	Advance to play-offs (unseeded) and promotion to League B	—	3–0	3–0 (Note: Lithuania refused to play against Belarus due to Belarusian involvement in the Russian invasion of Ukraine. UEFA subsequently declared the matches as forfeited by Lithuania and they were deemed to have lost both matches 0–3.)	5–0
2	Georgia	6	3	1	2	6	7	−1	10	Advance to play-offs (unseeded)	0–2	—	2–2	1–0
3	Lithuania	6	2	1	3	5	10	−5	7		0–3	0–1	—	1–0
4	Cyprus	6	0	0	6	1	14	−13	0		0–3	0–2	1–2	—

Source: UEFA
(P) Promoted

=== Group C2 ===
Pos	Team	Pld	W	D	L	GF	GA	GD	Pts	Qualification	(Slovenia)	(Latvia)	(North Macedonia)	(Moldova)
1	Slovenia (P)	6	6	0	0	26	0	+26	18	Advance to play-offs (unseeded) and promotion to League B	—	6–0	4–0	2–0
2	Latvia	6	3	0	3	8	16	−8	9		0–4	—	3–4	2–1
3	North Macedonia	6	2	1	3	10	17	−7	7		0–5	1–2	—	1–1
4	Moldova	6	0	1	5	4	15	−11	1		0–5	0–1	2–4	—

Source: UEFA
(P) Promoted

=== Group C3 ===
Pos	Team	Pld	W	D	L	GF	GA	GD	Pts	Qualification	(Greece)	(Montenegro)	(Faroe Islands)	(Andorra)
1	Greece (P)	6	5	1	0	17	4	+13	16	Advance to play-offs (unseeded) and promotion to League B	—	2–2	1–0	6–0
2	Montenegro	6	3	1	2	21	10	+11	10	Advance to play-offs (unseeded)	2–3	—	5–1	6–1
3	Faroe Islands	6	3	0	3	11	9	+2	9		0–2	2–1	—	4–0
4	Andorra	6	0	0	6	2	28	−26	0		0–3	1–5	0–4	—

Source: UEFA
(P) Promoted

=== Group C4 ===
Pos	Team	Pld	W	D	L	GF	GA	GD	Pts	Qualification	(Romania)	(Bulgaria)	(Armenia)	(Kazakhstan)
1	Romania (P)	6	6	0	0	16	1	+15	18	Advance to play-offs (unseeded) and promotion to League B	—	1–0	3–1	1–0
2	Bulgaria	6	2	1	3	6	8	−2	7		0–3	—	2–3	0–0
3	Armenia	6	2	0	4	8	18	−10	6		0–5	1–3	—	2–1
4	Kazakhstan	6	1	1	4	5	8	−3	4		0–3	0–1	4–1	—

Source: UEFA
(P) Promoted

=== Group C5 ===
Pos	Team	Pld	W	D	L	GF	GA	GD	Pts	Qualification	(Albania)	(Luxembourg)	(Estonia)
1	Albania (P)	4	3	0	1	8	4	+4	9	Advance to play-offs (unseeded) and promotion to League B	—	3–1	2–0
2	Luxembourg	4	1	2	1	5	6	−1	5	Advance to play-offs (unseeded)	2–1	—	1–1
3	Estonia	4	0	2	2	3	6	−3	2		1–2	1–1	—

Source: UEFA
(P) Promoted

=== Ranking of second-placed teams ===
Due to unequal group sizes in League C, results against fourth-placed teams were not considered when comparing teams finishing first, second, or third in their groups.

Rnk	Grp	Team	Pld	W	D	L	GF	GA	GD	Pts	Qualification
1	C5	Luxembourg	4	1	2	1	5	6	−1	5	Advance to play-offs (unseeded)
2	C3	Montenegro	4	1	1	2	10	8	+2	4	Advance to play-offs (unseeded)
3	C1	Georgia	4	1	1	2	3	7	−4	4	Advance to play-offs (unseeded)
4	C4	Bulgaria	4	1	0	3	5	8	−3	3	
5	C2	Latvia	4	1	0	3	5	15	−10	3	

Source: UEFA

== Play-offs ==
The play-offs determined the final seven teams that qualified for the final tournament and were played over two rounds.

28 teams competed in the play-offs: the 8 worst-ranked teams in League A, the top 12 teams in League B (excluding hosts Switzerland), and the top 8 teams in League C.

In the first round, the eight worst-ranked teams in League A were seeded and drawn into ties against the eight best-ranked teams in League C. The eight winners progressed to the second round. In addition, the six best-ranked teams in League B (except Switzerland) were seeded and drawn into ties against the next six best-ranked teams in League B. The six winners progressed to the second round.

In the second round, the teams from both paths came together and were drawn into seven ties. The winners of those ties progressed to the final tournament.

=== Teams ===
The following teams qualified for the first round of the play-offs, and were seeded as shown.

Round 1: Path 1

Seeded		Unseeded	
Team	Rnk	Team	Rnk
Sweden	9	Slovenia	33
Norway	10	Romania	34
Austria	11	Belarus	35
Belgium	12	Greece	36
Finland	13	Albania	37
Czech Republic	14	Luxembourg	38
Republic of Ireland	15	Montenegro	39
Poland	16	Georgia	40

Round 1: Path 2

Seeded		Unseeded	
Team	Rnk	Team	Rnk
Portugal	17	Turkey	24
Scotland	18	Croatia	25
Wales	20	Hungary	26
Serbia	21	Bosnia and Herzegovina	27
Ukraine	22	Slovakia	28
Northern Ireland	23	Azerbaijan	29

Round 2

The ties for the second round were drawn before the winners of round 1 were known, and were seeded as follows.

Seeded	Unseeded
Winner of path 1 tie involving Sweden	Winner of path 1 tie involving Poland
Winner of path 1 tie involving Norway	Winner of path 2 tie involving Portugal
Winner of path 1 tie involving Austria	Winner of path 2 tie involving Scotland
Winner of path 1 tie involving Belgium	Winner of path 2 tie involving Wales
Winner of path 1 tie involving Finland	Winner of path 2 tie involving Serbia
Winner of path 1 tie involving Czech Republic	Winner of path 2 tie involving Ukraine
Winner of path 1 tie involving Republic of Ireland	Winner of path 2 tie involving Northern Ireland

=== First round ===
The first round matches took place on 25 and 29 October 2024. Each tie was played over two legs, with the seeded teams playing the second leg at home.

Round 1: Path 1

Team 1	Agg.	Team 2	1st leg	2nd leg
Romania	2–6	Poland	1–2	1–4
Greece	0–5	Belgium	0–0	0–5
Montenegro	0–6	Finland	0–1	0–5
Georgia	0–9	Republic of Ireland	0–6	0–3
Slovenia	1–5	Austria	0–3	1–2
Luxembourg	0–12	Sweden	0–4	0–8
Belarus	1–8	Czech Republic	1–8	0–0
Albania	0–14	Norway	0–5	0–9

Round 1: Path 2

Team 1	Agg.	Team 2	1st leg	2nd leg
Turkey	1–3	Ukraine	1–1	0–2
Croatia	1–2	Northern Ireland	1–1	0–1 (a.e.t.)
Bosnia and Herzegovina	3–6	Serbia	2–2	1–4
Azerbaijan	1–8	Portugal	1–4	0–4
Hungary	0–5	Scotland	0–1	0–4
Slovakia	2–3	Wales	2–1	0–2 (a.e.t.)

=== Second round ===
The second round matches took place on 28/29 November and 3 December 2024. Each tie was played over two legs, with the seeded teams playing the second leg at home.

Team 1	Agg.	Team 2	1st leg	2nd leg
Portugal	3–2	Czech Republic	1–1	2–1
Scotland	0–2	Finland	0–0	0–2
Ukraine	1–4	Belgium	0–2	1–2
Wales	3–2	Republic of Ireland	1–1	2–1
Poland	2–0	Austria	1–0	1–0
Northern Ireland	0–7	Norway	0–4	0–3
Serbia	0–8	Sweden	0–2	0–6

== Qualified teams ==
Qualified for Women's Euro 2025 Did not qualify Did not enter Suspended by UEFA

The following teams qualified for the final tournament alongside the hosts Switzerland.

Team	Qualified as	Qualified on	Previous appearances in Women's Euro^{1}
Switzerland	Hosts	4 April 2023	2 (2017, 2022)
Germany	Group A4 winners	4 June 2024	11 (**1989**, **1991**, 1993, **1995**, **1997**, **2001**, **2005**, **2009**, **2013**, 2017, 2022)
Spain	Group A2 winners	4 June 2024	4 (1997, 2013, 2017, 2022)
Iceland	Group A4 runners-up	12 July 2024	4 (2009, 2013, 2017, 2022)
Denmark	Group A2 runners-up	12 July 2024	10 (1984, 1991, 1993, 1997, 2001, 2005, 2009, 2013, 2017, 2022)
France	Group A3 winners	12 July 2024	7 (1997, 2001, 2005, 2009, 2013, 2017, 2022)
England	Group A3 runners-up	16 July 2024	9 (1984, 1987, 1995, 2001, 2005, 2009, 2013, 2017, **2022**)
Italy	Group A1 winners	16 July 2024	12 (1984, 1987, 1989, 1991, 1993, 1997, 2001, 2005, 2009, 2013, 2017, 2022)
Netherlands	Group A1 runners-up	16 July 2024	4 (2009, 2013, **2017**, 2022)
Portugal	Play-off winner	3 December 2024	2 (2017, 2022)
Norway	Play-off winner	3 December 2024	12 (**1987**, 1989, 1991, **1993**, 1995, 1997, 2001, 2005, 2009, 2013, 2017, 2022)
Finland	Play-off winner	3 December 2024	4 (2005, 2009, 2013, 2022)
Poland	Play-off winner	3 December 2024	0 (debut)
Sweden	Play-off winner	3 December 2024	11 (**1984**, 1987, 1989, 1995, 1997, 2001, 2005, 2009, 2013, 2017, 2022)
Belgium	Play-off winner	3 December 2024	2 (2017, 2022)
Wales	Play-off winner	3 December 2024	0 (debut)

^{1} Bold indicates champions for that year. Italic indicates hosts for that year.

== Overall ranking ==
The results of each team's league rankings were used to calculate the overall ranking of the competition, using the ranking criteria, and were used for seeding in the Euro 2025 final tournament draw and the upcoming 2025 Women's Nations League. Teams were promoted or relegated for the next Nations League as indicated.

Key
Promotion to higher league for 2025 Women's Nations League
Relegation to lower league for 2025 Women's Nations League

League A

Rnk	Team	Pld	Pts
1	Spain	6	15
2	Germany	6	15
3	France	6	12
4	Italy	6	9
5	Iceland	6	13
6	Denmark	6	12
7	England	6	11
8	Netherlands	6	9
9	Sweden	6	8
10	Norway	6	7
11	Austria	6	7
12	Belgium	6	4
13	Finland	6	5
14	Czech Republic	6	4
15	Republic of Ireland	6	3
16	Poland	6	0

Source: UEFA
League B

Rnk	Team	Pld	Pts
17	Portugal	6	16
18	Scotland	6	16
19	Switzerland	6	15
20	Wales	6	14
21	Serbia	6	13
22	Ukraine	6	11
23	Northern Ireland	6	10
24	Turkey	6	9
25	Croatia	6	9
26	Hungary	6	7
27	Bosnia and Herzegovina	6	7
28	Slovakia	6	4
29	Azerbaijan	6	4
30	Malta	6	1
31	Israel	6	1
32	Kosovo	6	0

Source: UEFA
League C (Note: Due to unequal group sizes in League C, results against fourth-placed teams were not considered when comparing teams finishing first, second, or third in their groups.)

Rnk	Team	Pld	Pts
33	Slovenia	4	12
34	Romania	4	12
35	Belarus	4	12
36	Greece	4	10
37	Albania	4	9
38	Luxembourg	4	5
39	Montenegro	4	4
40	Georgia	4	4
41	Bulgaria	4	3
42	Latvia	4	3
43	Faroe Islands	4	3
44	Armenia	4	3
45	North Macedonia	4	3
46	Estonia	4	2
47	Lithuania	4	1
48	Kazakhstan	6	4
49	Moldova	6	1
50	Cyprus	6	0
51	Andorra	6	0

Source: UEFA

== Top goalscorers ==
There were 576 goals scored in 191 matches, for an average of 3.02 goals per match.

Rank	Player	Goals
1	(Slovenia) Lara Prašnikar (Note: The UEFA Player Stats table reported only 8 goals for Lara Prašnikar, but her Matches Played page reported 9 goals scored in 8 matches.)	9
2	(Norway) Frida Maanum	7
2	(Scotland) Martha Thomas	7
4	(Germany) Lea Schüller	6
4	(Montenegro) Slađana Bulatović	6
4	(Montenegro) Armisa Kuč	6
4	(Portugal) Diana Silva	6
4	(Wales) Jess Fishlock	6
9	(Austria) Eileen Campbell	5
9	(Austria) Sarah Puntigam	5
9	(Belgium) Tessa Wullaert	5
9	(Bosnia and Herzegovina) Milena Nikolić	5
9	(Czech Republic) Kateřina Svitková	5
9	(Germany) Klara Bühl	5
9	(Greece) Sophia Koggouli	5
9	(Poland) Natalia Padilla	5
