= Maturazeugnis =

Austrian secondary school final exam

The Maturazeugnis, also known simply as the Matura, is the secondary school leaving qualification in Austria. It is a school leaving certificate documenting the grades earned from the Reifeprüfung examinations.

The Maturazeugnis contains only the grades of the written and oral exams. The grading is done on a scale of 1 (Very Good) to 5 (Not Enough). In addition, it contains an overall summary of the grades earned by the student in the exams:

- Distinction - a grade point average of 1.5 and a maximum of only "Very Good" (1) to "Satisfactory" (3) in all subjects
- Good Pass - a grade point average of at most 2.0 and only "Very Good" (1) to "Satisfactory" (3) in all subjects
- Pass - with passing grades in all subjects
- Fail - a grade of "Insufficient" earned in one or more subjects

Students who have not passed the Matura in the first attempt have the opportunity to repeat the final examination for the secondary appointments in September / October and January / February as well as in the coming school year.

A tradition has developed that upon successful completion of the final examination of all candidates in the school, or sometimes in the class, a white flag is hoisted, symbolic of the secondary school graduates.

== See also ==
- Matura
