= Ivana Projkovska =

Macedonian football referee

- Born: 11 March 1986 (age 40); Skopje, SFR Yugoslavia

International
Years	League	Role

Ivana Projkovska (Macedonian: Ивана Пројковска; born 11 March 1986 in Skopje) is a Macedonian football referee.

== Early life ==
Projkovska studied criminology.

== Career ==
Projkovska is the first Macedonian female international FIFA licensed referee. She refereed at UEFA Women's Euro 2022.

== Personal life ==
Projkovska was a supporter of English side Leeds.
