= Lina Lehtovaara =

Finnish football referee

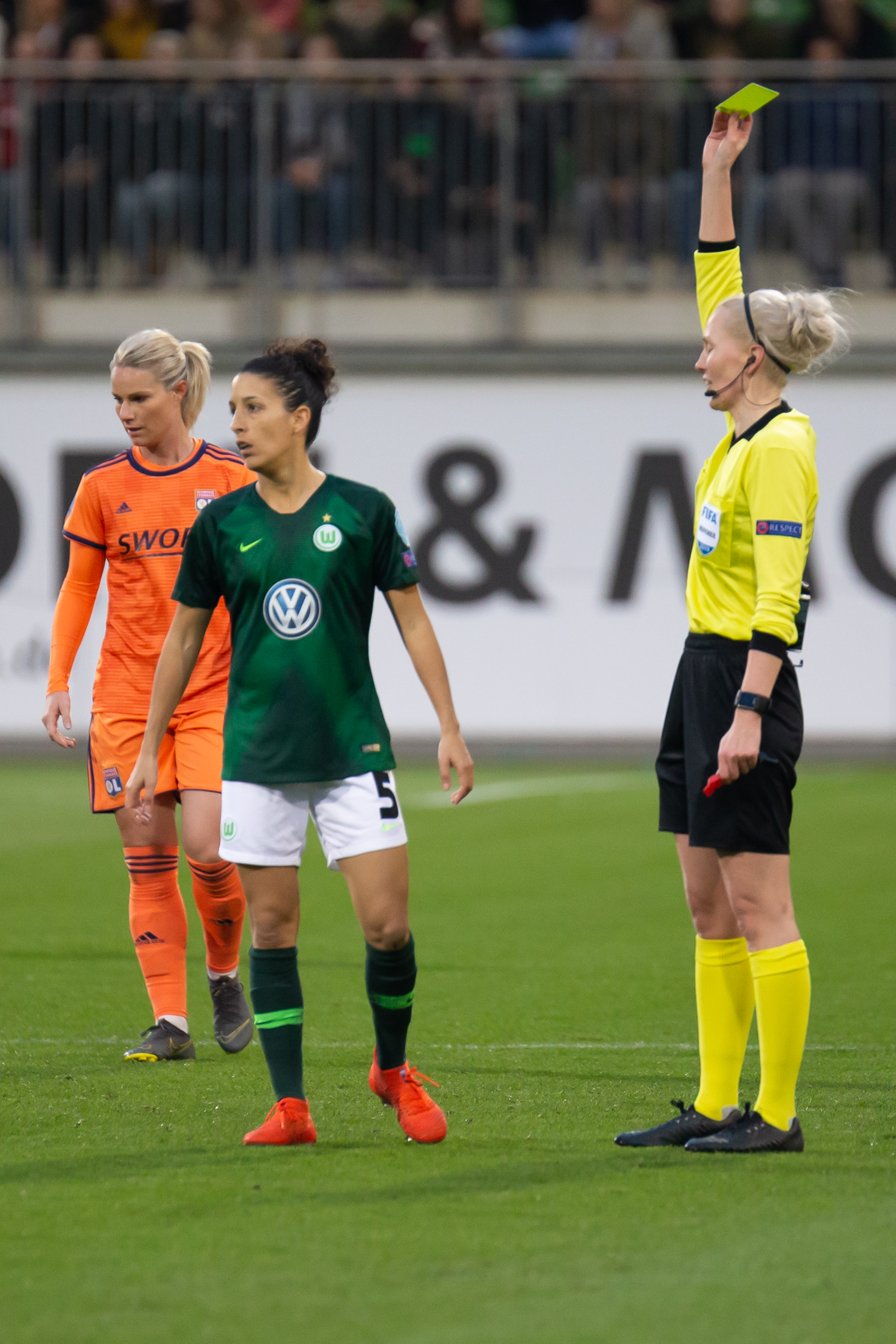
- Lina Lehtovaara (far right) in 2019
- Born: Lina Långbacka; 23 June 1981 (age 45); Kokkola, Finland
- Other occupation: Teacher

Domestic
Years	League	Role

International
Years	League	Role
2009–	FIFA listed	Referee

Lina Lehtovaara (née Långbacka, born 23 June 1981) is a Finnish football referee who has been a FIFA referee since 2009. Football Association of Finland has awarded Lehtovaara as the Referee of the Year in 2015–2016 and 2018–2021.

Lehtovaara has refereed in the Finnish women's premier division Kansallinen Liiga and the men's second and third tiers Ykkönen and Kakkonen. In 2022, Lehtovaara refereed the 2022 UEFA Women's Champions League Final between FC Barcelona and Olympique Lyon. She was also one of the referees of the UEFA Women's Euro 2022. On 9 January 2023, FIFA appointed her to the officiating pool for the 2023 FIFA Women's World Cup in Australia and New Zealand.

Lehtovaara lives in Pargas and works as a teacher. Her brother is the former football goalkeeper Gustav Långbacka.
