= Olatz Rivera Olmedo =

Spanish football referee (born 1996)

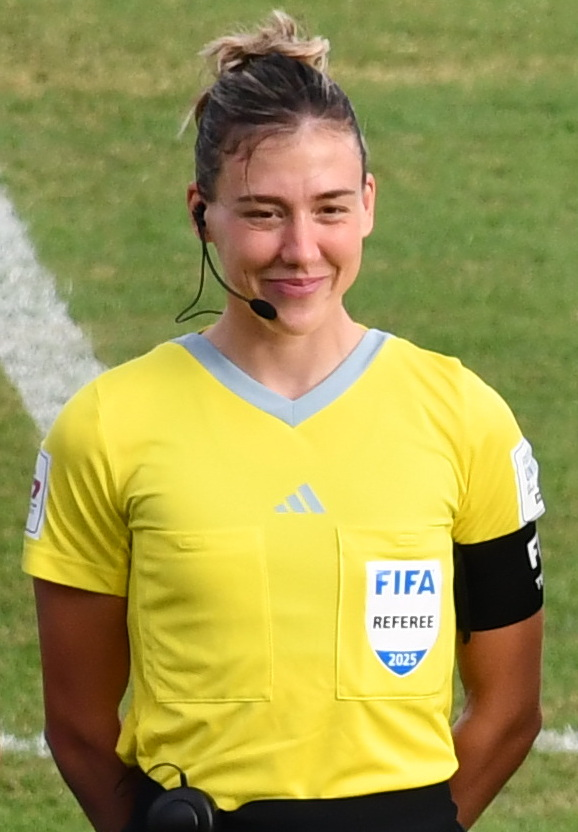
- Rivera at the 2025 FIFA U-17 Women's World Cup
- Full name: Olatz Rivera Olmedo
- Born: 7 October 1996 (age 30); Bilbao, Spain
- Other occupation: Computer engineer

Domestic
Years	League	Role
2017–present	Liga F	Referee

International
Years	League	Role
2022–present	FIFA listed	Referee

Olatz Rivera Olmedo (born 7 October 1996) is a Spanish football referee from Bilbao who officiates in the Liga F, Spain's women's top division. A UEFA Elite and FIFA international referee, she was promoted to UEFA's Elite category in December 2024, making Spain one of only four countries, alongside Portugal, Italy and Romania, to have two women in that category. She has refereed two Supercopa de España Femenina finals, the 2026 Copa de la Reina final, a UEFA Women's Euro 2025 group match and the 2025 FIFA U-17 Women's World Cup final, and in 2026 she became the second woman to officiate in Spanish men's professional football.

== Early life and refereeing beginnings ==
Rivera was born in Bilbao, in the Basque province of Biscay, on 7 October 1996. She played football before turning to officiating and took up refereeing as a teenager, making her debut in the women's top flight at about the age of 20; she gave up playing once she was promoted to that level. Away from the pitch she trained as a computer engineer and competes in triathlon.

== Women's football ==
Rivera reached the top category of Spanish women's football in 2017 and became a UEFA international referee in 2022, joining the body's second international category. With her promotion to the UEFA Elite category in December 2024 she joined Marta Huerta de Aza among Spain's elite officials, having belonged to UEFA's second international tier since 2022. She has also officiated league Clásicos between Barcelona and Real Madrid.

Her first Supercopa de España final came in 2024, when Barcelona beat Levante UD 7-0. On 26 January 2025 she refereed her second Supercopa final, between Barcelona and Real Madrid at the Estadio Municipal de Butarque in Leganés; it was her fourth Clásico since reaching the elite.

In May 2026 the Technical Committee of Referees chose Rivera to officiate the Copa de la Reina final between Barcelona and Atlético de Madrid at the Estadio de Gran Canaria, the first Copa de la Reina final of her career; Marta Huerta de Aza acted as fourth official.

== International appointments ==
Rivera made her debut at a senior international tournament at UEFA Women's Euro 2025 in Switzerland, where she was appointed to the Group C match between Poland and Denmark. She was accompanied by assistant referee Eliana Fernández, with Guillermo Cuadra Fernández on the video assistant referee. The match was described in the Spanish press as a milestone for the presence of women in international refereeing.

Later that year, FIFA designated Rivera to referee the final of the 2025 FIFA U-17 Women's World Cup in Rabat, Morocco, again with Eliana Fernández as her assistant. The final, played on 8 November 2025, was contested by North Korea and the Netherlands.

== Men's football ==
Rivera also officiates in men's football. She made her debut in the Segunda Federación in 2023 and reached the Primera Federación in 2024, where she became the first woman to referee an official first-team match of CD Tenerife. In June 2026 she was promoted to the Segunda División, becoming only the second woman to officiate in Spanish men's professional football, after Marta Huerta de Aza.

== Honours and recognition ==
Rivera was named best female referee of the year at Marca's women's sport awards (Premios del Deporte Femenino) in 2023, the second time she received the distinction; that same year she had also been recognised as the best Liga F referee of the season at the Vicente Acebedo Awards given by the Spanish Football Federation's Technical Committee of Referees.
