= UEFA Women's Euro 2025 squads =

The UEFA Women's Euro 2025 was an international women's association football tournament held in Switzerland from 2 to 27 July 2025. The 16 national teams involved in the tournament were required to register a squad of 23 players, including three goalkeepers. Only players in these squads were eligible to take part in the tournament. If a player became seriously injured or ill prior to the tournament as assessed by both their team doctor and a doctor from the UEFA Medical Committee, they could be replaced in the squad prior to their first match. Each team was required to submit their squad list by 25 June.

The age listed for each player is on 2 July 2025, the first day of the tournament. The numbers of caps and goals listed for each player do not include any matches played after the start of the tournament. The club listed is the club for which the player last played a competitive match prior to the tournament. A flag is included for coaches who are of a different nationality than their own national team.

== Group A ==
=== Finland ===
Head coach: Marko Saloranta

Finland announced their 23-player squad on 19 June 2025.

Adelina Engman withdrew from the squad on 2 July with a thigh injury and was replaced by Anni Hartikainen.

No.	Pos.	Player	Date of birth (age)	Caps	Goals	Club
1	GK	Anna Koivunen	6 November 2001 (aged 23)	5	0	(Swedish Football Association) Djurgården
2	MF	Vilma Koivisto	21 November 2002 (aged 22)	9	1	(Swedish Football Association) Linköping
3	DF	Eva Nyström	29 November 1999 (aged 25)	29	2	(The Football Association) West Ham United
4	MF	Ria Öling	15 September 1994 (aged 30)	94	11	(The Football Association) Crystal Palace
5	DF	Emma Koivisto	25 September 1994 (aged 30)	109	7	(Italian Football Federation) AC Milan
6	DF	Joanna Tynnilä	1 September 2001 (aged 23)	21	0	(Norwegian Football Federation) Brann
7	DF	Anni Hartikainen	19 August 2003 (aged 21)	12	1	(Swedish Football Association) Rosengård
8	MF	Olga Ahtinen	15 August 1997 (aged 27)	75	4	(The Football Association) Tottenham Hotspur
9	MF	Katariina Kosola	24 February 2001 (aged 24)	22	3	(Swedish Football Association) Malmö FF
10	DF	Emmi Siren	23 February 2001 (aged 24)	8	0	(Danish Football Association) Nordsjælland
11	MF	Nora Heroum	20 July 1994 (aged 30)	93	2	(Italian Football Federation) Sampdoria
12	GK	Anna Tamminen	30 October 1994 (aged 30)	16	0	(Swedish Football Association) Hammarby IF
13	MF	Oona Siren	23 February 2001 (aged 24)	24	1	(The Football Association) West Ham United
14	FW	Heidi Kollanen	6 June 1997 (aged 28)	40	3	(Swedish Football Association) Vittsjö GIK
15	DF	Natalia Kuikka	1 December 1995 (aged 29)	99	4	(United States Soccer Federation) Chicago Stars FC
16	DF	Nea Lehtola	24 October 1998 (aged 26)	14	3	(Norwegian Football Federation) Brann
17	FW	Sanni Franssi	19 March 1995 (aged 30)	91	7	(Royal Spanish Football Federation) Real Sociedad
18	FW	Linda Sällström (captain)	13 July 1988 (aged 36)	152	64	(Swedish Football Association) Vittsjö GIK
19	DF	Maaria Roth	13 June 1997 (aged 28)	2	0	(Football Association of Finland) HJK
20	MF	Eveliina Summanen	29 May 1998 (aged 27)	76	14	(The Football Association) Tottenham Hotspur
21	FW	Oona Sevenius	28 April 2004 (aged 21)	26	5	(Swedish Football Association) Rosengård
22	FW	Jutta Rantala	11 November 1999 (aged 25)	31	10	(The Football Association) Leicester City
23	GK	Tinja-Riikka Korpela	5 May 1986 (aged 39)	128	0	(Swiss Football Association) Servette

=== Iceland ===
Head coach: Þorsteinn Halldórsson

Iceland announced their 23-player squad on 13 June 2025.

No.	Pos.	Player	Date of birth (age)	Caps	Goals	Club
1	GK	Cecilía Rán Rúnarsdóttir	26 July 2003 (aged 21)	20	0	(Italian Football Federation) Inter Milan
2	MF	Berglind Rós Ágústsdóttir	28 July 1995 (aged 29)	20	1	(Football Association of Iceland) Valur
3	FW	Sandra Jessen	18 January 1995 (aged 30)	54	7	(Football Association of Iceland) Þór/KA
4	DF	Glódís Perla Viggósdóttir (captain)	27 June 1995 (aged 30)	137	11	(German Football Association) Bayern Munich
5	DF	Sædís Rún Heiðarsdóttir	16 September 2004 (aged 20)	19	0	(Norwegian Football Federation) Vålerenga
6	DF	Ingibjörg Sigurðardóttir	7 October 1997 (aged 27)	75	2	(Danish Football Association) Brøndby
7	MF	Karólína Lea Vilhjálmsdóttir	8 August 2001 (aged 23)	54	15	(German Football Association) Bayer Leverkusen
8	MF	Alexandra Jóhannsdóttir	19 March 2000 (aged 25)	55	6	(Swedish Football Association) Kristianstad
9	FW	Diljá Ýr Zomers	11 November 2001 (aged 23)	20	2	(Royal Belgian Football Association) OH Leuven
10	MF	Dagný Brynjarsdóttir	10 August 1991 (aged 33)	119	38	(The Football Association) West Ham United
11	DF	Natasha Anasi	2 October 1991 (aged 33)	9	1	(Football Association of Iceland) Valur
12	GK	Telma Ívarsdóttir	30 March 1999 (aged 26)	12	0	(Football Association of Iceland) Breiðablik
13	GK	Fanney Inga Birkisdóttir	17 March 2005 (aged 20)	8	0	(Swedish Football Association) BK Häcken
14	FW	Hlín Eiríksdóttir	12 June 2000 (aged 25)	50	6	(The Football Association) Leicester City
15	MF	Katla Tryggvadóttir	5 May 2005 (aged 20)	6	0	(Swedish Football Association) Kristianstad
16	MF	Hildur Antonsdóttir	18 September 1995 (aged 29)	27	2	(Royal Spanish Football Federation) Madrid CFF
17	MF	Agla María Albertsdóttir	5 August 1999 (aged 25)	61	4	(Football Association of Iceland) Breiðablik
18	DF	Guðrún Arnardóttir	29 July 1995 (aged 29)	52	1	(Swedish Football Association) Rosengård
19	DF	Áslaug Munda Gunnlaugsdóttir	2 June 2001 (aged 24)	20	0	(Football Association of Iceland) Breiðablik
20	DF	Guðný Árnadóttir	29 July 2000 (aged 24)	41	0	(Swedish Football Association) Kristianstad
21	DF	Hafrún Rakel Halldórsdóttir	1 October 2002 (aged 22)	16	1	(Danish Football Association) Brøndby
22	MF	Amanda Andradóttir	18 December 2003 (aged 21)	24	2	(Royal Dutch Football Association) Twente
23	FW	Sveindís Jane Jónsdóttir	5 June 2001 (aged 24)	51	14	(German Football Association) VfL Wolfsburg

=== Norway ===
Head coach: (England) Gemma Grainger

Norway announced their 23-player squad on 16 June 2025. Sophie Román Haug, Marthine Østenstad, Sunniva Skoglund and Maria Thorisdottir were also named as standby players to train with the squad. Guro Bergsvand withdrew from the squad due to injury on 25 June and was replaced by Østenstad.

No.	Pos.	Player	Date of birth (age)	Caps	Goals	Club
1	GK	Cecilie Fiskerstrand	20 March 1996 (aged 29)	61	0	(Italian Football Federation) Fiorentina
2	DF	Marit Bratberg Lund	7 November 1997 (aged 27)	21	1	(Portuguese Football Federation) Benfica
3	DF	Emilie Woldvik	8 January 1999 (aged 26)	14	0	(Swedish Football Association) Rosengård
4	DF	Tuva Hansen	4 August 1997 (aged 27)	54	2	(German Football Association) Bayern Munich
5	DF	Marthine Østenstad	18 March 2001 (aged 24)	5	0	(Norwegian Football Federation) Brann
6	DF	Maren Mjelde	6 November 1989 (aged 35)	180	20	(The Football Association) Everton
7	MF	Ingrid Syrstad Engen	29 April 1998 (aged 27)	86	6	(Royal Spanish Football Federation) Barcelona
8	MF	Vilde Bøe Risa	13 July 1995 (aged 29)	87	4	(Royal Spanish Football Federation) Atlético Madrid
9	FW	Karina Sævik	24 March 1996 (aged 29)	61	8	(Norwegian Football Federation) Vålerenga
10	FW	Caroline Graham Hansen	18 February 1995 (aged 30)	116	51	(Royal Spanish Football Federation) Barcelona
11	MF	Guro Reiten	26 July 1994 (aged 30)	102	21	(The Football Association) Chelsea
12	GK	Selma Panengstuen	5 March 2003 (aged 22)	1	0	(Norwegian Football Federation) Brann
13	DF	Thea Bjelde	5 June 2000 (aged 25)	29	1	(Norwegian Football Federation) Vålerenga
14	FW	Ada Hegerberg (captain)	10 July 1995 (aged 29)	91	49	(French Football Federation) Lyon
15	MF	Justine Kielland	22 November 2002 (aged 22)	7	0	(German Football Association) VfL Wolfsburg
16	DF	Mathilde Harviken	29 December 2001 (aged 23)	33	1	(Italian Football Federation) Juventus
17	FW	Celin Bizet	24 October 2001 (aged 23)	28	7	(The Football Association) Manchester United
18	MF	Frida Maanum	16 July 1999 (aged 25)	91	21	(The Football Association) Arsenal
19	MF	Elisabeth Terland	28 June 2001 (aged 24)	42	10	(The Football Association) Manchester United
20	FW	Synne Jensen	15 February 1996 (aged 29)	29	5	(Royal Spanish Football Federation) Atlético Madrid
21	MF	Lisa Naalsund	11 June 1995 (aged 30)	26	1	(The Football Association) Manchester United
22	MF	Signe Gaupset	18 June 2005 (aged 20)	8	1	(Norwegian Football Federation) Brann
23	GK	Aurora Mikalsen	21 March 1996 (aged 29)	21	0	(German Football Association) 1. FC Köln

=== Switzerland ===
Head coach: (Sweden) Pia Sundhage

Switzerland announced their final 23-player squad on 23 June 2025. Luana Bühler withdrew from the squad due to injury on 30 June and was replaced with Laia Ballesté.

No.	Pos.	Player	Date of birth (age)	Caps	Goals	Club
1	GK	Elvira Herzog	5 March 2000 (aged 25)	21	0	(German Football Association) RB Leipzig
2	DF	Julia Stierli	3 April 1997 (aged 28)	49	1	(German Football Association) SC Freiburg
3	FW	Leila Wandeler	11 April 2006 (aged 19)	1	0	(French Football Federation) Lyon
4	MF	Noemi Ivelj	1 November 2006 (aged 18)	11	1	(Swiss Football Association) Grasshoppers
5	DF	Noelle Maritz	23 December 1995 (aged 29)	129	2	(The Football Association) Aston Villa
6	MF	Géraldine Reuteler	21 April 1999 (aged 26)	77	14	(German Football Association) Eintracht Frankfurt
7	MF	Riola Xhemaili	5 March 2003 (aged 22)	31	6	(Royal Dutch Football Association) PSV
8	DF	Nadine Riesen	11 April 2000 (aged 25)	30	1	(German Football Association) Eintracht Frankfurt
9	DF	Ana-Maria Crnogorčević	3 October 1990 (aged 34)	169	74	(United States Soccer Federation) Seattle Reign
10	FW	Meriame Terchoun	27 October 1995 (aged 29)	44	3	(French Football Federation) Dijon
11	MF	Coumba Sow	27 August 1994 (aged 30)	55	13	(Swiss Football Association) Basel
12	GK	Livia Peng	14 March 2002 (aged 23)	10	0	(German Football Association) Werder Bremen
13	MF	Lia Wälti (captain)	19 April 1993 (aged 32)	127	5	(The Football Association) Arsenal
14	MF	Smilla Vallotto	23 March 2004 (aged 21)	23	3	(Swedish Football Association) Hammarby IF
15	DF	Laia Ballesté	22 February 1999 (aged 26)	1	0	(Royal Spanish Football Federation) Espanyol
16	MF	Sandrine Mauron	19 December 1996 (aged 28)	46	2	(Swiss Football Association) Servette
17	FW	Svenja Fölmli	19 August 2002 (aged 22)	26	5	(German Football Association) SC Freiburg
18	DF	Viola Calligaris	17 March 1996 (aged 29)	67	8	(Italian Football Federation) Juventus
19	FW	Iman Beney	23 July 2006 (aged 18)	11	0	(Swiss Football Association) Young Boys
20	FW	Alayah Pilgrim	29 April 2003 (aged 22)	13	3	(Italian Football Federation) Roma
21	GK	Nadine Böhi	21 November 2002 (aged 22)	0	0	(Swiss Football Association) St Gallen
22	FW	Sydney Schertenleib	30 January 2007 (aged 18)	13	2	(Royal Spanish Football Federation) Barcelona
23	FW	Alisha Lehmann	21 January 1999 (aged 26)	59	8	(Italian Football Federation) Juventus

== Group B ==
=== Belgium ===
Head coach: (Iceland) Elísabet Gunnarsdóttir

Belgium announced their final 23-player squad on 11 June 2025.

No.	Pos.	Player	Date of birth (age)	Caps	Goals	Club
1	GK	Nicky Evrard	26 May 1995 (aged 30)	73	0	(Royal Dutch Football Association) PSV
2	DF	Davina Philtjens	26 February 1989 (aged 36)	127	10	(Italian Football Federation) Sassuolo
3	FW	Ella Van Kerkhoven	20 November 1993 (aged 31)	30	16	(Royal Dutch Football Association) Feyenoord
4	DF	Amber Tysiak	26 January 2000 (aged 25)	40	5	(The Football Association) West Ham United
5	MF	Sarah Wijnants	13 October 1999 (aged 25)	41	3	(Royal Belgian Football Association) Anderlecht
6	MF	Tine De Caigny	9 June 1997 (aged 28)	109	42	(Royal Belgian Football Association) Anderlecht
7	FW	Hannah Eurlings	1 January 2003 (aged 22)	41	6	(Royal Belgian Football Association) OH Leuven
8	MF	Jarne Teulings	11 January 2002 (aged 23)	24	2	(Royal Dutch Football Association) Feyenoord
9	FW	Tessa Wullaert (captain)	19 March 1993 (aged 32)	146	93	(Italian Football Federation) Inter Milan
10	MF	Justine Vanhaevermaet	29 April 1992 (aged 33)	74	9	(The Football Association) Everton
11	DF	Janice Cayman	12 October 1988 (aged 36)	163	48	(The Football Association) Leicester City
12	GK	Femke Bastiaen	11 April 2001 (aged 24)	0	0	(Royal Dutch Football Association) Utrecht
13	MF	Elena Dhont	27 March 1998 (aged 27)	42	4	(Italian Football Federation) Sassuolo
14	FW	Jassina Blom	3 September 1994 (aged 30)	42	11	(Royal Spanish Football Federation) UD Tenerife
15	FW	Mariam Toloba	20 September 1999 (aged 25)	10	2	(Royal Belgian Football Association) Standard Liège
16	DF	Zenia Mertens	27 February 2001 (aged 24)	6	0	(Royal Belgian Football Association) OH Leuven
17	DF	Jill Janssens	3 October 2003 (aged 21)	39	3	(German Football Association) TSG Hoffenheim
18	DF	Isabelle Iliano	2 March 1997 (aged 28)	13	0	(Royal Belgian Football Association) Club YLA
19	DF	Sari Kees	17 February 2001 (aged 24)	39	5	(The Football Association) Leicester City
20	MF	Marie Detruyer	13 January 2004 (aged 21)	27	3	(Italian Football Federation) Inter Milan
21	GK	Lisa Lichtfus	28 December 1999 (aged 25)	18	0	(French Football Federation) Le Havre
22	DF	Laura Deloose	18 June 1993 (aged 32)	105	4	(Royal Belgian Football Association) Anderlecht
23	MF	Kassandra Missipo	3 February 1998 (aged 27)	72	2	(Italian Football Federation) Sassuolo

=== Italy ===
Head coach: Andrea Soncin

Italy announced their final 23-player squad plus four reserves on 25 June 2025.

Chiara Beccari was withdrawn from the squad on 3 July with a thigh injury and was replaced with Valentina Bergamaschi.

No.	Pos.	Player	Date of birth (age)	Caps	Goals	Club
1	GK	Laura Giuliani	6 June 1993 (aged 32)	97	0	(Italian Football Federation) AC Milan
2	DF	Elisabetta Oliviero	18 July 1997 (aged 27)	7	0	(Italian Football Federation) Lazio
3	DF	Lucia Di Guglielmo	26 June 1997 (aged 28)	36	2	(Italian Football Federation) Roma
4	MF	Eva Schatzer	16 January 2005 (aged 20)	4	0	(Italian Football Federation) Juventus
5	DF	Elena Linari	15 April 1994 (aged 31)	115	6	(Italian Football Federation) Roma
6	MF	Manuela Giugliano	18 August 1997 (aged 27)	91	11	(Italian Football Federation) Roma
7	FW	Sofia Cantore	4 August 1999 (aged 25)	36	5	(Italian Football Federation) Juventus
8	MF	Emma Severini	18 July 2003 (aged 21)	10	1	(Italian Football Federation) Fiorentina
9	FW	Martina Piemonte	7 November 1997 (aged 27)	24	3	(Italian Football Federation) Lazio
10	FW	Cristiana Girelli (captain)	23 April 1990 (aged 35)	118	58	(Italian Football Federation) Juventus
11	FW	Barbara Bonansea	13 June 1991 (aged 34)	110	31	(Italian Football Federation) Juventus
12	GK	Rachele Baldi	2 October 1994 (aged 30)	1	0	(Italian Football Federation) Inter Milan
13	DF	Julie Piga	12 January 1998 (aged 27)	5	0	(Italian Football Federation) AC Milan
14	MF	Valentina Bergamaschi	22 February 1997 (aged 28)	25	5	(Italian Football Federation) Juventus
15	MF	Annamaria Serturini	13 May 1998 (aged 27)	27	1	(Italian Football Federation) Inter Milan
16	MF	Eleonora Goldoni	16 February 1996 (aged 29)	6	0	(Italian Football Federation) Lazio
17	DF	Lisa Boattin	3 May 1997 (aged 28)	67	1	(Italian Football Federation) Juventus
18	MF	Arianna Caruso	6 November 1999 (aged 25)	58	15	(German Football Association) Bayern Munich
19	DF	Martina Lenzini	23 July 1998 (aged 26)	39	0	(Italian Football Federation) Juventus
20	MF	Giada Greggi	18 February 2000 (aged 25)	23	1	(Italian Football Federation) Roma
21	FW	Michela Cambiaghi	4 February 1996 (aged 29)	17	5	(Italian Football Federation) Inter Milan
22	GK	Francesca Durante	12 February 1997 (aged 28)	13	0	(Italian Football Federation) Fiorentina
23	DF	Cecilia Salvai	2 December 1993 (aged 31)	59	3	(Italian Football Federation) Juventus

=== Portugal ===
Head coach: Francisco Neto

Portugal announced their final 23-player squad on 24 June 2025.

No.	Pos.	Player	Date of birth (age)	Caps	Goals	Club
1	GK	Inês Pereira	26 May 1999 (aged 26)	48	0	(Royal Spanish Football Federation) Deportivo La Coruña
2	DF	Catarina Amado	21 July 1999 (aged 25)	47	2	(Portuguese Football Federation) Benfica
3	DF	Lúcia Alves	22 October 1997 (aged 27)	24	2	(Portuguese Football Federation) Benfica
4	DF	Ana Seiça	25 March 2001 (aged 24)	13	0	(Mexican Football Federation) Tigres UANL
5	DF	Joana Marchão	24 October 1996 (aged 28)	55	3	(Swiss Football Association) Servette
6	MF	Andreia Jacinto	8 June 2002 (aged 23)	52	1	(Royal Spanish Football Federation) Real Sociedad
7	MF	Kika Nazareth	17 November 2002 (aged 22)	43	10	(Royal Spanish Football Federation) Barcelona
8	MF	Andreia Norton	15 August 1996 (aged 28)	99	5	(Portuguese Football Federation) Benfica
9	DF	Ana Borges	15 June 1990 (aged 35)	185	11	(Portuguese Football Federation) Sporting CP
10	FW	Jéssica Silva	11 December 1994 (aged 30)	122	18	(United States Soccer Federation) Gotham FC
11	MF	Tatiana Pinto	28 March 1994 (aged 31)	126	7	(Royal Spanish Football Federation) Atlético Madrid
12	GK	Patrícia Morais	17 June 1992 (aged 33)	98	0	(Portuguese Football Federation) Braga
13	MF	Fátima Pinto	16 January 1996 (aged 29)	92	4	(Portuguese Football Federation) Sporting CP
14	MF	Dolores Silva (captain)	7 August 1991 (aged 33)	172	18	(Portuguese Football Federation) Braga
15	DF	Carole Costa	3 May 1990 (aged 35)	180	25	(Portuguese Football Federation) Benfica
16	MF	Andreia Faria	19 April 2000 (aged 25)	32	2	(Portuguese Football Federation) Benfica
17	FW	Diana Silva	4 June 1995 (aged 30)	117	26	(Portuguese Football Federation) Sporting CP
18	DF	Carolina Correia	3 April 2002 (aged 23)	2	0	(Portuguese Football Federation) Torreense
19	DF	Diana Gomes	26 July 1998 (aged 26)	56	6	(Royal Spanish Football Federation) Sevilla
20	MF	Beatriz Fonseca	15 September 1998 (aged 26)	5	1	(Portuguese Football Federation) Sporting CP
21	FW	Ana Capeta	22 December 1997 (aged 27)	48	11	(Portuguese Football Federation) Sporting CP
22	GK	Sierra Cota-Yarde	4 July 2003 (aged 21)	1	0	(Canadian Soccer Association) AFC Toronto
23	FW	Telma Encarnação	11 October 2001 (aged 23)	41	7	(Portuguese Football Federation) Sporting CP

=== Spain ===
Head coach: Montse Tomé

Spain announced their final 23-player squad on 10 June 2025.

No.	Pos.	Player	Date of birth (age)	Caps	Goals	Club
1	GK	Esther Sullastres	20 March 1993 (aged 32)	1	0	(Royal Spanish Football Federation) Sevilla
2	DF	Ona Batlle	10 June 1999 (aged 26)	62	2	(Royal Spanish Football Federation) Barcelona
3	DF	Jana Fernández	18 February 2002 (aged 23)	9	0	(Royal Spanish Football Federation) Barcelona
4	DF	Irene Paredes (captain)	4 July 1991 (aged 33)	116	13	(Royal Spanish Football Federation) Barcelona
5	DF	María Méndez	10 April 2001 (aged 24)	14	2	(Royal Spanish Football Federation) Real Madrid
6	MF	Aitana Bonmatí	18 January 1998 (aged 27)	78	30	(Royal Spanish Football Federation) Barcelona
7	DF	Olga Carmona	12 June 2000 (aged 25)	56	3	(Royal Spanish Football Federation) Real Madrid
8	FW	Mariona Caldentey	19 March 1996 (aged 29)	89	29	(The Football Association) Arsenal
9	FW	Esther González	8 December 1992 (aged 32)	51	33	(United States Soccer Federation) Gotham FC
10	MF	Athenea del Castillo	24 October 2000 (aged 24)	60	16	(Royal Spanish Football Federation) Real Madrid
11	MF	Alexia Putellas	4 February 1994 (aged 31)	132	34	(Royal Spanish Football Federation) Barcelona
12	MF	Patricia Guijarro	17 May 1998 (aged 27)	69	12	(Royal Spanish Football Federation) Barcelona
13	GK	Cata Coll	23 April 2001 (aged 24)	27	0	(Royal Spanish Football Federation) Barcelona
14	DF	Laia Aleixandri	25 August 2000 (aged 24)	42	3	(The Football Association) Manchester City
15	DF	Leila Ouahabi	22 March 1993 (aged 32)	62	1	(The Football Association) Manchester City
16	FW	Cristina Martín-Prieto	14 March 1993 (aged 32)	5	2	(Portuguese Football Federation) Benfica
17	FW	Lucía García	14 July 1998 (aged 26)	57	13	(Mexican Football Federation) Monterrey
18	FW	Salma Paralluelo	13 November 2003 (aged 21)	39	14	(Royal Spanish Football Federation) Barcelona
19	MF	Vicky López	26 July 2006 (aged 18)	10	3	(Royal Spanish Football Federation) Barcelona
20	FW	Clàudia Pina	12 August 2001 (aged 23)	15	7	(Royal Spanish Football Federation) Barcelona
21	FW	Alba Redondo	27 August 1996 (aged 28)	43	16	(Royal Spanish Football Federation) Real Madrid
22	MF	Maite Zubieta	28 May 2002 (aged 23)	6	0	(Royal Spanish Football Federation) Athletic Bilbao
23	GK	Adriana Nanclares	9 May 2002 (aged 23)	2	0	(Royal Spanish Football Federation) Athletic Bilbao

== Group C ==
=== Denmark ===
Head coach: (Sweden) Andrée Jeglertz

Denmark announced their final 23-player squad on 20 June 2025.

No.	Pos.	Player	Date of birth (age)	Caps	Goals	Club
1	GK	Maja Bay Østergaard	28 March 1998 (aged 27)	18	0	(Swedish Football Association) Växjö DFF
2	DF	Sara Thrige	15 May 1996 (aged 29)	28	2	(Royal Dutch Football Association) PSV
3	DF	Stine Ballisager	3 January 1994 (aged 31)	69	4	(Italian Football Federation) Fiorentina
4	DF	Emma Færge	6 December 2000 (aged 24)	12	1	(Italian Football Federation) Fiorentina
5	DF	Isabella Obaze	30 October 2002 (aged 22)	14	1	(United States Soccer Federation) Portland Thorns
6	MF	Karen Holmgaard	28 January 1999 (aged 26)	34	3	(The Football Association) Everton
7	DF	Sanne Troelsgaard	15 August 1988 (aged 36)	195	57	(Italian Football Federation) Roma
8	MF	Emma Snerle	23 March 2001 (aged 24)	44	2	(Italian Football Federation) Fiorentina
9	FW	Nadia Nadim	2 January 1988 (aged 37)	105	38	(Swedish Football Association) Hammarby IF
10	FW	Pernille Harder (captain)	15 November 1992 (aged 32)	162	78	(German Football Association) Bayern Munich
11	DF	Katrine Veje	19 June 1991 (aged 34)	168	9	(The Football Association) Crystal Palace
12	MF	Kathrine Kühl	5 July 2003 (aged 21)	49	2	(Italian Football Federation) Roma
13	MF	Josefine Hasbo	20 November 2001 (aged 23)	33	3	(United States Soccer Federation) Gotham FC
14	FW	Sofie Bredgaard	18 January 2002 (aged 23)	19	2	(Italian Football Federation) Fiorentina
15	DF	Frederikke Thøgersen	24 July 1995 (aged 29)	84	3	(Italian Football Federation) Roma
16	GK	Kathrine Larsen	5 May 1993 (aged 32)	8	0	(Italian Football Federation) Sampdoria
17	MF	Rikke Madsen	9 August 1997 (aged 27)	33	1	(The Football Association) Everton
18	DF	Sara Holmgaard	28 January 1999 (aged 26)	23	2	(The Football Association) Everton
19	MF	Janni Thomsen	16 February 2000 (aged 25)	49	9	(United States Soccer Federation) Utah Royals
20	FW	Signe Bruun	6 April 1998 (aged 27)	52	24	(Royal Spanish Football Federation) Real Madrid
21	FW	Amalie Vangsgaard	29 November 1996 (aged 28)	35	10	(Italian Football Federation) Juventus
22	GK	Alberte Vingum	14 November 2004 (aged 20)	1	0	(Danish Football Association) HB Køge
23	FW	Cornelia Kramer	16 December 2002 (aged 22)	4	1	(German Football Association) Bayer Leverkusen

=== Germany ===
Head coach: Christian Wück

Germany announced their final 23-player squad on 12 June 2025, along with a 12-player standby list.

No.	Pos.	Player	Date of birth (age)	Caps	Goals	Club
1	GK	Ann-Katrin Berger	9 October 1990 (aged 34)	22	0	(United States Soccer Federation) Gotham FC
2	DF	Sarai Linder	26 October 1999 (aged 25)	25	1	(German Football Association) VfL Wolfsburg
3	DF	Kathrin Hendrich	6 April 1992 (aged 33)	83	5	(German Football Association) VfL Wolfsburg
4	DF	Rebecca Knaak	23 June 1996 (aged 29)	4	0	(The Football Association) Manchester City
5	DF	Carlotta Wamser	1 November 2003 (aged 21)	2	0	(German Football Association) Eintracht Frankfurt
6	DF	Janina Minge	11 June 1999 (aged 26)	21	1	(German Football Association) VfL Wolfsburg
7	DF	Giulia Gwinn (captain)	2 July 1999 (aged 26)	63	14	(German Football Association) Bayern Munich
8	MF	Sydney Lohmann	19 June 2000 (aged 25)	39	6	(German Football Association) Bayern Munich
9	MF	Sjoeke Nüsken	22 January 2001 (aged 24)	45	5	(The Football Association) Chelsea
10	FW	Laura Freigang	1 February 1998 (aged 27)	39	17	(German Football Association) Eintracht Frankfurt
11	FW	Lea Schüller	12 November 1997 (aged 27)	75	52	(German Football Association) Bayern Munich
12	GK	Stina Johannes	23 January 2000 (aged 25)	3	0	(German Football Association) Eintracht Frankfurt
13	MF	Sara Däbritz	15 February 1995 (aged 30)	108	18	(French Football Federation) Lyon
14	FW	Cora Zicai	29 November 2004 (aged 20)	3	2	(German Football Association) SC Freiburg
15	FW	Selina Cerci	31 May 2000 (aged 25)	9	5	(German Football Association) TSG Hoffenheim
16	MF	Linda Dallmann	2 September 1994 (aged 30)	67	14	(German Football Association) Bayern Munich
17	DF	Franziska Kett	24 October 2004 (aged 20)	3	0	(German Football Association) Bayern Munich
18	FW	Giovanna Hoffmann	20 September 1998 (aged 26)	7	3	(German Football Association) RB Leipzig
19	FW	Klara Bühl	7 December 2000 (aged 24)	67	28	(German Football Association) Bayern Munich
20	MF	Elisa Senß	10 January 1997 (aged 28)	21	2	(German Football Association) Eintracht Frankfurt
21	GK	Ena Mahmutovic	23 December 2003 (aged 21)	1	0	(German Football Association) Bayern Munich
22	MF	Jule Brand	16 October 2002 (aged 22)	60	9	(German Football Association) VfL Wolfsburg
23	DF	Sophia Kleinherne	12 April 2000 (aged 25)	34	1	(German Football Association) Eintracht Frankfurt

=== Poland ===
Head coach: Nina Patalon

Poland announced their final 23-player squad on 13 June 2025. Martyna Brodzik withdrew from the squad due to health reasons on 22 June and was replaced with Małgorzata Mesjasz.

No.	Pos.	Player	Date of birth (age)	Caps	Goals	Club
1	GK	Kinga Szemik	25 June 1997 (aged 28)	28	0	(The Football Association) West Ham United
2	DF	Martyna Wiankowska	24 December 1996 (aged 28)	93	11	(German Football Association) 1. FC Köln
3	DF	Wiktoria Zieniewicz	9 May 2002 (aged 23)	22	0	(Swiss Football Association) Basel
4	DF	Paulina Dudek	16 June 1997 (aged 28)	60	7	(French Football Federation) Paris Saint-Germain
5	DF	Oliwia Woś	15 August 1999 (aged 25)	22	0	(Swiss Football Association) Basel
6	DF	Sylwia Matysik	20 May 1997 (aged 28)	64	0	(German Football Association) 1. FC Köln
7	DF	Małgorzata Mesjasz	12 June 1997 (aged 28)	52	4	(Italian Football Federation) AC Milan
8	MF	Ewelina Kamczyk	22 February 1996 (aged 29)	100	17	(French Football Federation) Fleury
9	FW	Ewa Pajor (captain)	3 December 1996 (aged 28)	101	68	(Royal Spanish Football Federation) Barcelona
10	FW	Weronika Zawistowska	17 December 1999 (aged 25)	42	8	(German Football Association) Bayern Munich
11	MF	Tanja Pawollek	18 January 1999 (aged 26)	26	1	(German Football Association) Eintracht Frankfurt
12	GK	Natalia Radkiewicz	8 August 2003 (aged 21)	2	0	(Polish Football Association) Pogoń Szczecin
13	DF	Emilia Szymczak	17 June 2006 (aged 19)	11	0	(Royal Spanish Football Federation) Barcelona B
14	MF	Dominika Grabowska	26 December 1998 (aged 26)	88	9	(German Football Association) TSG Hoffenheim
15	MF	Milena Kokosz	17 August 2001 (aged 23)	8	1	(Norwegian Football Federation) Åsane
16	FW	Klaudia Jedlińska	9 February 2000 (aged 25)	14	1	(French Football Federation) Dijon
17	MF	Klaudia Słowińska	13 August 1999 (aged 25)	7	1	(Polish Football Association) GKS Katowice
18	FW	Nadia Krezyman	22 June 2004 (aged 21)	10	1	(French Football Federation) Dijon
19	FW	Natalia Padilla	6 November 2002 (aged 22)	44	12	(Royal Spanish Football Federation) Sevilla
20	DF	Kayla Adamek	1 February 1995 (aged 30)	22	2	(Canadian Soccer Association) Ottawa Rapid
21	FW	Paulina Tomasiak	2 January 2002 (aged 23)	6	4	(Polish Football Association) Górnik Łęczna
22	GK	Kinga Seweryn	31 March 2005 (aged 20)	0	0	(Polish Football Association) GKS Katowice
23	MF	Adriana Achcińska	22 April 2002 (aged 23)	42	7	(German Football Association) 1. FC Köln

=== Sweden ===
Head coach: Peter Gerhardsson

Sweden announced their final 23-player squad on 11 June 2025. On 22 June 2025, Matilda Vinberg was named as a standby player to replace Fridolina Rolfö should she not recover from her injury in time.

No.	Pos.	Player	Date of birth (age)	Caps	Goals	Club
1	GK	Emma Holmgren	13 May 1997 (aged 28)	0	0	(Royal Spanish Football Federation) Levante
2	DF	Jonna Andersson	2 January 1993 (aged 32)	108	3	(Swedish Football Association) Linköping
3	DF	Linda Sembrant	15 May 1987 (aged 38)	156	19	(German Football Association) Bayern Munich
4	DF	Hanna Lundkvist	17 July 2002 (aged 22)	22	0	(United States Soccer Federation) San Diego Wave
5	DF	Amanda Nildén	7 August 1998 (aged 26)	13	0	(The Football Association) Tottenham Hotspur
6	DF	Magdalena Eriksson	8 September 1993 (aged 31)	121	14	(German Football Association) Bayern Munich
7	MF	Madelen Janogy	12 November 1995 (aged 29)	54	10	(Italian Football Federation) Fiorentina
8	FW	Lina Hurtig	5 September 1995 (aged 29)	73	22	(The Football Association) Arsenal
9	FW	Kosovare Asllani (captain)	29 July 1989 (aged 35)	199	48	(The Football Association) London City Lionesses
10	MF	Sofia Jakobsson	23 April 1990 (aged 35)	165	23	(The Football Association) London City Lionesses
11	FW	Stina Blackstenius	5 February 1996 (aged 29)	117	39	(The Football Association) Arsenal
12	GK	Jennifer Falk	26 April 1993 (aged 32)	31	0	(Swedish Football Association) BK Häcken
13	DF	Amanda Ilestedt	17 January 1993 (aged 32)	77	12	(The Football Association) Arsenal
14	DF	Nathalie Björn	4 May 1997 (aged 28)	74	6	(The Football Association) Chelsea
15	MF	Julia Zigiotti Olme	24 December 1997 (aged 27)	44	2	(German Football Association) Bayern Munich
16	MF	Filippa Angeldahl	14 July 1997 (aged 27)	71	22	(Royal Spanish Football Federation) Real Madrid
17	FW	Ellen Wangerheim	1 September 2004 (aged 20)	3	0	(Swedish Football Association) Hammarby IF
18	FW	Fridolina Rolfö	24 November 1993 (aged 31)	98	32	(Royal Spanish Football Federation) Barcelona
19	FW	Johanna Rytting Kaneryd	12 February 1997 (aged 28)	57	8	(The Football Association) Chelsea
20	MF	Hanna Bennison	16 October 2002 (aged 22)	56	3	(Italian Football Federation) Juventus
21	GK	Tove Enblom	20 November 1994 (aged 30)	1	0	(Norwegian Football Federation) Vålerenga
22	DF	Smilla Holmberg	11 October 2006 (aged 18)	2	0	(Swedish Football Association) Hammarby IF
23	FW	Rebecka Blomqvist	24 July 1997 (aged 27)	36	9	(German Football Association) VfL Wolfsburg

== Group D ==
=== England ===
Head coach: (Netherlands) Sarina Wiegman

England announced their final 23-player squad on 5 June 2025. Sophie Baggaley, Laura Blindkilde Brown, Missy Bo Kearns and Lucy Parker were named as standby players and trained with the squad until 30 June.

No.	Pos.	Player	Date of birth (age)	Caps	Goals	Club
1	GK	Hannah Hampton	16 November 2000 (aged 24)	16	0	(The Football Association) Chelsea
2	DF	Lucy Bronze	28 October 1991 (aged 33)	134	19	(The Football Association) Chelsea
3	DF	Niamh Charles	21 June 1999 (aged 26)	24	0	(The Football Association) Chelsea
4	MF	Keira Walsh	8 April 1997 (aged 28)	87	1	(The Football Association) Chelsea
5	DF	Alex Greenwood	7 September 1993 (aged 31)	99	7	(The Football Association) Manchester City
6	DF	Leah Williamson (captain)	29 March 1997 (aged 28)	58	5	(The Football Association) Arsenal
7	FW	Lauren James	29 September 2001 (aged 23)	28	7	(The Football Association) Chelsea
8	MF	Georgia Stanway	3 January 1999 (aged 26)	78	22	(German Football Association) Bayern Munich
9	FW	Beth Mead	9 May 1995 (aged 30)	68	36	(The Football Association) Arsenal
10	MF	Ella Toone	2 September 1999 (aged 25)	59	21	(The Football Association) Manchester United
11	FW	Lauren Hemp	7 August 2000 (aged 24)	64	18	(The Football Association) Manchester City
12	DF	Maya Le Tissier	18 April 2002 (aged 23)	8	0	(The Football Association) Manchester United
13	GK	Anna Moorhouse	30 March 1995 (aged 30)	0	0	(United States Soccer Federation) Orlando Pride
14	MF	Grace Clinton	31 March 2003 (aged 22)	11	3	(The Football Association) Manchester United
15	DF	Esme Morgan	18 October 2000 (aged 24)	14	0	(United States Soccer Federation) Washington Spirit
16	DF	Jess Carter	27 October 1997 (aged 27)	45	2	(United States Soccer Federation) Gotham FC
17	FW	Michelle Agyemang	3 February 2006 (aged 19)	1	1	(The Football Association) Brighton & Hove Albion
18	FW	Chloe Kelly	15 January 1998 (aged 27)	53	8	(The Football Association) Arsenal
19	FW	Aggie Beever-Jones	27 July 2003 (aged 21)	8	5	(The Football Association) Chelsea
20	MF	Jess Park	21 October 2001 (aged 23)	19	3	(The Football Association) Manchester City
21	GK	Khiara Keating	27 June 2004 (aged 21)	0	0	(The Football Association) Manchester City
22	DF	Lotte Wubben-Moy	11 January 1999 (aged 26)	13	1	(The Football Association) Arsenal
23	FW	Alessia Russo	8 February 1999 (aged 26)	51	23	(The Football Association) Arsenal

=== France ===
Head coach: Laurent Bonadei

France announced their final 23-player squad on 5 June 2025.

No.	Pos.	Player	Date of birth (age)	Caps	Goals	Club
1	GK	Justine Lerond	29 February 2000 (aged 25)	0	0	(French Football Federation) Montpellier
2	DF	Maëlle Lakrar	27 May 2000 (aged 25)	30	3	(Royal Spanish Football Federation) Real Madrid
3	DF	Thiniba Samoura	11 February 2004 (aged 21)	7	0	(French Football Federation) Paris Saint-Germain
4	DF	Alice Sombath	16 October 2003 (aged 21)	4	0	(French Football Federation) Lyon
5	DF	Élisa De Almeida	11 January 1998 (aged 27)	44	5	(French Football Federation) Paris Saint-Germain
6	MF	Sandie Toletti	13 July 1995 (aged 29)	69	3	(Royal Spanish Football Federation) Real Madrid
7	MF	Sakina Karchaoui	26 January 1996 (aged 29)	89	3	(French Football Federation) Paris Saint-Germain
8	MF	Grace Geyoro	2 July 1997 (aged 28)	99	21	(French Football Federation) Paris Saint-Germain
9	FW	Melvine Malard	28 June 2000 (aged 25)	29	9	(The Football Association) Manchester United
10	MF	Amel Majri	25 January 1993 (aged 32)	80	12	(French Football Federation) Lyon
11	FW	Kadidiatou Diani	1 April 1995 (aged 30)	114	30	(French Football Federation) Lyon
12	FW	Marie-Antoinette Katoto	1 November 1998 (aged 26)	55	38	(French Football Federation) Paris Saint-Germain
13	DF	Selma Bacha	9 November 2000 (aged 24)	46	3	(French Football Federation) Lyon
14	FW	Clara Mateo	28 November 1997 (aged 27)	37	7	(French Football Federation) Paris FC
15	FW	Kelly Gago	5 January 1999 (aged 26)	6	2	(The Football Association) Everton
16	GK	Pauline Peyraud-Magnin	17 March 1992 (aged 33)	65	0	(Italian Football Federation) Juventus
17	MF	Sandy Baltimore	19 February 2000 (aged 25)	43	9	(The Football Association) Chelsea
18	MF	Oriane Jean-François	14 August 2001 (aged 23)	14	0	(The Football Association) Chelsea
19	DF	Griedge Mbock Bathy (captain)	26 February 1995 (aged 30)	92	8	(French Football Federation) Paris Saint-Germain
20	FW	Delphine Cascarino	5 February 1997 (aged 28)	76	14	(United States Soccer Federation) San Diego Wave
21	GK	Constance Picaud	5 July 1998 (aged 26)	13	0	(French Football Federation) Fleury
22	DF	Melween N'Dongala	6 September 2004 (aged 20)	3	0	(French Football Federation) Paris FC
23	DF	Lou Bogaert	25 June 2004 (aged 21)	4	0	(French Football Federation) Paris FC

=== Netherlands ===
Head coach: Andries Jonker

The Netherlands announced their final 23-player squad on 21 June 2025.

No.	Pos.	Player	Date of birth (age)	Caps	Goals	Club
1	GK	Daphne van Domselaar	6 March 2000 (aged 25)	34	0	(The Football Association) Arsenal
2	DF	Lynn Wilms	3 October 2000 (aged 24)	53	1	(German Football Association) VfL Wolfsburg
3	DF	Caitlin Dijkstra	30 January 1999 (aged 26)	27	1	(German Football Association) VfL Wolfsburg
4	DF	Veerle Buurman	21 April 2006 (aged 19)	6	1	(Royal Dutch Football Association) PSV
5	FW	Romée Leuchter	12 January 2001 (aged 24)	23	5	(French Football Federation) Paris Saint-Germain
6	MF	Jill Roord	22 April 1997 (aged 28)	108	30	(The Football Association) Manchester City
7	FW	Lineth Beerensteyn	11 October 1996 (aged 28)	114	39	(German Football Association) VfL Wolfsburg
8	DF	Sherida Spitse (captain)	29 May 1990 (aged 35)	244	46	(Royal Dutch Football Association) Ajax
9	FW	Vivianne Miedema	15 July 1996 (aged 28)	125	99	(The Football Association) Manchester City
10	MF	Daniëlle van de Donk	5 August 1991 (aged 33)	168	38	(French Football Federation) Lyon
11	FW	Esmee Brugts	28 July 2003 (aged 21)	46	10	(Royal Spanish Football Federation) Barcelona
12	FW	Chasity Grant	19 April 2001 (aged 24)	17	1	(The Football Association) Aston Villa
13	FW	Renate Jansen	7 December 1990 (aged 34)	71	8	(Royal Dutch Football Association) PSV
14	MF	Jackie Groenen	17 December 1994 (aged 30)	125	10	(French Football Federation) Paris Saint-Germain
15	FW	Katja Snoeijs	31 August 1996 (aged 28)	38	12	(The Football Association) Everton
16	GK	Lize Kop	17 March 1998 (aged 27)	15	0	(The Football Association) Tottenham Hotspur
17	MF	Victoria Pelova	3 June 1999 (aged 26)	60	4	(The Football Association) Arsenal
18	DF	Kerstin Casparij	19 August 2000 (aged 24)	45	0	(The Football Association) Manchester City
19	MF	Wieke Kaptein	29 August 2005 (aged 19)	21	2	(The Football Association) Chelsea
20	DF	Dominique Janssen	17 January 1995 (aged 30)	125	6	(The Football Association) Manchester United
21	MF	Damaris Egurrola	26 August 1999 (aged 25)	41	7	(French Football Federation) Lyon
22	DF	Ilse van der Zanden	25 July 1995 (aged 29)	4	0	(Royal Dutch Football Association) Utrecht
23	GK	Daniëlle de Jong	11 October 2002 (aged 22)	1	0	(Royal Dutch Football Association) Twente

=== Wales ===
Head coach: (Canada) Rhian Wilkinson

Wales announced their final 23-player squad on 19 June 2025. Poppy Soper withdrew from the squad due to injury on 12 July and was replaced with Soffia Kelly.

No.	Pos.	Player	Date of birth (age)	Caps	Goals	Club
1	GK	Olivia Clark	30 August 2001 (aged 23)	30	0	(The Football Association) Leicester City
2	DF	Lily Woodham	3 September 2000 (aged 24)	39	3	(The Football Association) Crystal Palace
3	DF	Gemma Evans	1 August 1996 (aged 28)	77	1	(The Football Association) Liverpool
4	MF	Sophie Ingle	2 September 1991 (aged 33)	141	6	(The Football Association) Chelsea
5	DF	Rhiannon Roberts	30 August 1990 (aged 34)	79	2	(Royal Spanish Football Federation) Real Betis
6	DF	Josie Green	25 April 1993 (aged 32)	39	0	(The Football Association) Crystal Palace
7	MF	Ceri Holland	12 December 1997 (aged 27)	43	7	(The Football Association) Liverpool
8	MF	Angharad James-Turner (captain)	1 June 1994 (aged 31)	132	6	(United States Soccer Federation) Seattle Reign
9	FW	Kayleigh Barton	22 March 1988 (aged 37)	86	22	(The Football Association) Charlton Athletic
10	MF	Jess Fishlock	14 January 1987 (aged 38)	162	47	(United States Soccer Federation) Seattle Reign
11	FW	Hannah Cain	11 February 1999 (aged 26)	16	3	(The Football Association) Leicester City
12	GK	Poppy Soper (until 12 July)	4 May 2002 (aged 23)	0	0	(The Football Association) Blackburn Rovers
12	GK	Soffia Kelly (from 12 July)	6 March 2007 (aged 18)	0	0	(The Football Association) Aston Villa
13	MF	Rachel Rowe	13 September 1992 (aged 32)	76	8	(The Football Association) Southampton
14	DF	Hayley Ladd	6 October 1993 (aged 31)	105	3	(The Football Association) Everton
15	FW	Elise Hughes	15 April 2001 (aged 24)	31	3	(The Football Association) Crystal Palace
16	DF	Charlie Estcourt	27 May 1998 (aged 27)	48	3	(United States Soccer Federation) DC Power FC
17	MF	Lois Joel	2 June 1999 (aged 26)	9	0	(The Football Association) Newcastle United
18	DF	Esther Morgan	28 August 2002 (aged 22)	11	0	(The Football Association) Sheffield United
19	DF	Ella Powell	1 February 2000 (aged 25)	14	0	(The Football Association) Bristol City
20	FW	Carrie Jones	4 September 2003 (aged 21)	37	3	(Swedish Football Association) IFK Norrköping
21	GK	Safia Middleton-Patel	21 September 2004 (aged 20)	4	0	(The Football Association) Manchester United
22	MF	Alice Griffiths	22 January 2001 (aged 24)	16	0	(The Football Association) Durham
23	FW	Ffion Morgan	11 May 2000 (aged 25)	43	2	(The Football Association) Bristol City

== Statistics ==
=== Age ===
- Oldest (goalkeeper): (Finland) Tinja-Riikka Korpela (39 years, 58 days)
- Oldest (outfield): (Wales) Jess Fishlock (38 years, 169 days)
- Youngest (goalkeeper): (Poland) Kinga Seweryn (20 years, 93 days)
- Youngest (outfield): (Switzerland) Sydney Schertenleib (18 years, 153 days)
- Oldest captain: (Finland) Linda Sällström (36 years, 354 days)
- Youngest captain: (Germany) Giulia Gwinn (26 years, 145 days)

=== Caps ===
- The tournament featured 53 players with at least 100 international caps for their national team, of whom 16 with more than 150 international caps:
  - 244 caps – (Netherlands) Sherida Spitse
  - 199 caps – (Sweden) Kosovare Asllani
  - 195 caps – (Denmark) Sanne Troelsgaard
  - 185 caps – (Portugal) Ana Borges
  - 180 caps – (Portugal) Carole Costa
  - 180 caps – (Norway) Maren Mjelde
  - 172 caps – (Portugal) Dolores Silva
  - 169 caps – (Switzerland) Ana-Maria Crnogorčević
  - 168 caps – (Netherlands) Daniëlle van de Donk
  - 168 caps – (Denmark) Katrine Veje
  - 165 caps – (Sweden) Sofia Jakobsson
  - 163 caps – (Belgium) Janice Cayman
  - 162 caps – (Wales) Jess Fishlock
  - 162 caps – (Denmark) Pernille Harder
  - 156 caps – (Sweden) Linda Sembrant
  - 152 caps – (Finland) Linda Sällström

=== Player representation by club ===
Clubs with three or more players represented are listed.

Players	Clubs
18	(Spain) Barcelona
16	(Germany) Bayern Munich
14	(England) Chelsea, (Italy) Juventus
13	(England) Arsenal
10	(England) Manchester City, (Germany) VfL Wolfsburg
9	(England) Manchester United, (France) Lyon, (France) Paris Saint-Germain
8	(England) Everton, (Germany) Eintracht Frankfurt, (Italy) Fiorentina, (Italy) Roma, (Spain) Real Madrid
7	(Portugal) Benfica
6	(England) Leicester City, (Italy) Inter Milan, (Portugal) Sporting CP
5	(England) Crystal Palace, (England) West Ham United, (Netherlands) PSV Eindhoven, (Norway) Brann, (Sweden) Hammarby IF, (United States) Gotham FC
4	(England) Tottenham Hotspur, (Germany) 1. FC Köln, (Italy) AC Milan, (Norway) Vålerenga, (Sweden) Rosengård
3	(Belgium) Anderlecht, (Belgium) OH Leuven, (England) Aston Villa, (France) Dijon, (France) Paris FC, (Germany) SC Freiburg, (Germany) TSG Hoffenheim, (Iceland) Breiðablik, (Italy) Lazio, (Italy) Sassuolo, (Spain) Atlético Madrid, (Spain) Sevilla, (Sweden) Kristianstad, (Switzerland) Basel, (Switzerland) Servette, (United States) Seattle Reign

=== Player representation by club nationality ===
Nations in italics were not a member of UEFA.

Country	Total players	Outside national squad
England	90	71
Germany	49	30
Italy	48	26
Spain	42	25
France	28	13
Sweden	22	18
Portugal	16	2
United States	16	
Netherlands	12	7
Norway	10	5
Switzerland	9	4
Belgium	8	1
Iceland	6	0
Denmark	4	3
Poland	4	0
Canada	2	
Mexico	2	
Finland	1	0

=== Player representation by club federation ===
Federation	Players
UEFA	349
CONCACAF	20
