= UEFA Women's Euro 2025 Group C =

Football tournament group stage

Group C of UEFA Women's Euro 2025 was played from 4 to 12 July 2025. The group was made up of Germany, Poland, Denmark and Sweden. The top two teams of the group, Sweden and Germany, advanced to the quarter-finals.

== Teams ==
Draw position	Team	Pot	Method of qualification	Date of qualification	Finals appearance	Last appearance	Previous best performance	Euro 2025 qualifying rankings (Note: The UEFA Women's Euro 2025 qualifying ranking was used for seeding for the final draw.)	FIFA Rankings June 2025
C1	Germany	1	Group A4 winner	4 June 2024	12th	2022	Winners (1989, 1991, 1995, 1997, 2001, 2005, 2009, 2013)	2	3
C2	Poland	4	Play-off winner	3 December 2024	1st	—	Debut	16	28
C3	Denmark	2	Group A2 runners-up	12 July 2024	11th	2022	Runners-up (2017)	6	12
C4	Sweden	3	Play-off winner	3 December 2024	12th	2022	Winners (1984)	9	5

== Standings ==
Pos	Team	Pld	W	D	L	GF	GA	GD	Pts	Qualification
1	Sweden	3	3	0	0	8	1	+7	9	Advance to knockout stage
2	Germany	3	2	0	1	5	5	0	6	Advance to knockout stage
3	Poland	3	1	0	2	3	7	−4	3	
4	Denmark	3	0	0	3	3	6	−3	0	

Source: UEFA
Rules for classification: Group stage tiebreakers

== Matches ==
=== Denmark vs Sweden ===
4 July 2025
18:00

Denmark	0–1	Sweden
	Report	Angeldahl 55'

Stade de Genève, Geneva
Attendance: 17,319
Referee: Edina Alves Batista (Brazil)

Denmark	Sweden

GK	1	Maja Bay Østergaard
CB	4	Emma Færge
CB	3	Stine Ballisager Pedersen
CB	11	Katrine Veje
RM	15	Frederikke Thøgersen
CM	6	Karen Holmgaard		(substituted off) 63'
CM	8	Emma Snerle	(yellow card) 45+7'	(substituted off) 89'
LM	18	Sara Holmgaard		(substituted off) 75'
AM	19	Janni Thomsen
CF	21	Amalie Vangsgaard		(substituted off) 63'
CF	10	Pernille Harder (c)
Substitutions:
FW	20	Signe Bruun		(substituted in) 63'
MF	13	Josefine Hasbo		(substituted in) 63'
FW	9	Nadia Nadim		(substituted in) 75'
DF	7	Sanne Troelsgaard Nielsen		(substituted in) 89'
Manager:
(Sweden) Andrée Jeglertz

GK	12	Jennifer Falk
RB	4	Hanna Lundkvist	(substituted off) 66'
CB	14	Nathalie Björn
CB	3	Linda Sembrant
LB	2	Jonna Andersson
CM	16	Filippa Angeldahl	(substituted off) 90'
CM	9	Kosovare Asllani (c)	(substituted off) 83'
CM	15	Julia Zigiotti Olme
RF	19	Johanna Rytting Kaneryd	(substituted off) 83'
CF	11	Stina Blackstenius
LF	7	Madelen Janogy	(substituted off) 66'
Substitutions:
DF	22	Smilla Holmberg	(substituted in) 66'
FW	23	Rebecka Blomqvist	(substituted in) 66'
FW	8	Lina Hurtig	(substituted in) 83'
MF	10	Sofia Jakobsson	(substituted in) 83'
MF	20	Hanna Bennison	(substituted in) 90'
Manager:
Peter Gerhardsson

Player of the Match:
Filippa Angeldahl (Sweden)

Assistant referees:
Neuza Back (Brazil)
Fabrini Bevilaqua (Brazil)
Fourth official:
Ivana Martinčić (Croatia)
Video assistant referee:
Tiago Martins (Portugal)
Assistant video assistant referee:
Jelena Cvetković (Serbia)

=== Germany vs Poland ===
4 July 2025
21:00

Germany	2–0	Poland
Brand 52'; Schüller 66'	Report

Arena St.Gallen, St. Gallen
Attendance: 15,972
Referee: Stéphanie Frappart (France)

Germany	Poland

GK	1	Ann-Katrin Berger
RB	7	Giulia Gwinn (c)	(substituted off) 40'
CB	6	Janina Minge
CB	4	Rebecca Knaak
LB	2	Sarai Linder
CM	20	Elisa Senß	(substituted off) 70'
CM	9	Sjoeke Nüsken
RW	22	Jule Brand
AM	16	Linda Dallmann	(substituted off) 70'
LW	19	Klara Bühl	(substituted off) 85'
CF	11	Lea Schüller	(substituted off) 70'
Substitutions:
DF	5	Carlotta Wamser	(substituted in) 40'
MF	8	Sydney Lohmann	(substituted in) 70'
FW	10	Laura Freigang	(substituted in) 70'
FW	18	Giovanna Hoffmann	(substituted in) 70'
FW	15	Selina Cerci	(substituted in) 85'
Manager:
Christian Wück

GK	1	Kinga Szemik
RB	6	Sylwia Matysik
CB	13	Emilia Szymczak
CB	4	Paulina Dudek		(substituted off) 46'
LB	2	Martyna Wiankowska
CM	23	Adriana Achcińska	(yellow card) 69'
CM	11	Tanja Pawollek		(substituted off) 80'
CM	8	Ewelina Kamczyk		(substituted off) 67'
RF	21	Paulina Tomasiak		(substituted off) 80'
CF	9	Ewa Pajor (c)
LF	19	Natalia Padilla		(substituted off) 59'
Substitutions:
DF	5	Oliwia Woś		(substituted in) 46'
DF	20	Kayla Adamek		(substituted in) 59'
MF	17	Klaudia Słowińska	(yellow card) 90+2'	(substituted in) 67'
MF	14	Dominika Grabowska		(substituted in) 80'
FW	18	Nadia Krezyman		(substituted in) 80'
Manager:
Nina Patalon

Player of the Match:
Jule Brand (Germany)

Assistant referees:
Camille Soriano (France)
Emily Carney (England)
Fourth official:
Olatz Rivera Olmedo (Spain)
Video assistant referee:
Willy Delajod (France)
Assistant video assistant referee:
Judit Romano García (Spain)

=== Germany vs Denmark ===
8 July 2025
18:00

Germany	2–1	Denmark
Nüsken 56' (pen.); Schüller 66'	Report	Vangsgaard 26'

St. Jakob-Park, Basel
Attendance: 34,165
Referee: Catarina Campos (Portugal)

Germany	Denmark

GK	1	Ann-Katrin Berger
RB	5	Carlotta Wamser
CB	6	Janina Minge (c)
CB	4	Rebecca Knaak	(yellow card) 48'	(substituted off) 81'
LB	2	Sarai Linder
CM	20	Elisa Senß
CM	9	Sjoeke Nüsken
RW	22	Jule Brand		(substituted off) 90+9'
AM	16	Linda Dallmann		(substituted off) 70'
LW	19	Klara Bühl
CF	11	Lea Schüller		(substituted off) 70'
Substitutions:
FW	18	Giovanna Hoffmann		(substituted in) 70'
FW	10	Laura Freigang		(substituted in) 70'
DF	3	Kathrin Hendrich		(substituted in) 81'
FW	14	Cora Zicai		(substituted in) 90+9'
Manager:
Christian Wück

GK	1	Maja Bay Østergaard
CB	4	Emma Færge
CB	3	Stine Ballisager Pedersen
CB	11	Katrine Veje	(yellow card) 51'	(substituted off) 85'
RM	15	Frederikke Thøgersen
CM	6	Karen Holmgaard		(substituted off) 61'
CM	8	Emma Snerle		(substituted off) 69'
LM	18	Sara Holmgaard
RF	19	Janni Thomsen		(substituted off) 61'
CF	21	Amalie Vangsgaard		(substituted off) 61'
LF	10	Pernille Harder (c)
Substitutions:
FW	20	Signe Bruun		(substituted in) 61'
FW	23	Cornelia Kramer		(substituted in) 61'
DF	7	Sanne Troelsgaard Nielsen		(substituted in) 61'
MF	13	Josefine Hasbo		(substituted in) 69'
FW	9	Nadia Nadim		(substituted in) 85'
Manager:
(Sweden) Andrée Jeglertz

Player of the Match:
Klara Bühl (Germany)

Assistant referees:
Vannesa Gomes (Portugal)
Andreia Ferreria Sousa (Portugal)
Fourth official:
Hristiana Guteva (Bulgaria)
Video assistant referee:
Alen Borošak (Slovenia)
Assistant video assistant referee:
Tiago Martins (Portugal)

=== Poland vs Sweden ===
8 July 2025
21:00

Poland	0–3	Sweden
	Report	Blackstenius 28'; Asllani 52'; Hurtig 77'

Allmend Stadion Luzern, Lucerne
Attendance: 14,176
Referee: Maria Sole Ferrieri Caputi (Italy)

Poland	Sweden

GK	1	Kinga Szemik
RB	6	Sylwia Matysik
CB	13	Emilia Szymczak	(yellow card) 89'
CB	5	Oliwia Woś
LB	2	Martyna Wiankowska		(substituted off) 71'
CM	23	Adriana Achcińska		(substituted off) 78'
CM	11	Tanja Pawollek
CM	14	Dominika Grabowska		(substituted off) 46'
RF	18	Nadia Krezyman		(substituted off) 46'
CF	9	Ewa Pajor (c)
LF	21	Paulina Tomasiak		(substituted off) 78'
Substitutions:
MF	8	Ewelina Kamczyk		(substituted in) 46'
FW	19	Natalia Padilla		(substituted in) 46'
DF	3	Wiktoria Zieniewicz		(substituted in) 71'
FW	10	Weronika Zawistowska		(substituted in) 78'
MF	15	Milena Kokosz		(substituted in) 78'
Manager:
Nina Patalon

GK	12	Jennifer Falk
RB	4	Hanna Lundkvist
CB	14	Nathalie Björn
CB	13	Amanda Ilestedt
LB	5	Amanda Nildén		(substituted off) 46'
CM	16	Filippa Angeldahl
CM	9	Kosovare Asllani (c)	(yellow card) 30'	(substituted off) 68'
CM	15	Julia Zigiotti Olme		(substituted off) 68'
RF	19	Johanna Rytting Kaneryd
CF	11	Stina Blackstenius		(substituted off) 85'
LF	7	Madelen Janogy		(substituted off) 77'
Substitutions:
DF	2	Jonna Andersson		(substituted in) 46'
FW	8	Lina Hurtig		(substituted in) 68'
MF	20	Hanna Bennison		(substituted in) 68'
FW	18	Fridolina Rolfö		(substituted in) 77'
FW	17	Ellen Wangerheim		(substituted in) 85'
Manager:
Peter Gerhardsson

Player of the Match:
Johanna Rytting Kaneryd (Sweden)

Assistant referees:
Francesca Di Monte (Italy)
Emily Carney (England)
Fourth official:
Shona Shukrula (Netherlands)
Video assistant referee:
Jarred Gillett (England)
Assistant video assistant referee:
Dennis Higler (Netherlands)

=== Sweden vs Germany ===
12 July 2025
21:00

Sweden	4–1	Germany
Blackstenius 12'; Holmberg 25'; Rolfö 34' (pen.); Hurtig 80'	Report	Brand 7'

Stadion Letzigrund, Zurich
Attendance: 22,552
Referee: Silvia Gasperotti (Italy)

Sweden	Germany

GK	12	Jennifer Falk
RB	22	Smilla Holmberg
CB	14	Nathalie Björn	(substituted off) 46'
CB	6	Magdalena Eriksson
LB	2	Jonna Andersson
CM	16	Filippa Angeldahl	(substituted off) 82'
CM	9	Kosovare Asllani (c)	(substituted off) 56'
CM	20	Hanna Bennison
RF	19	Johanna Rytting Kaneryd
CF	11	Stina Blackstenius	(substituted off) 71'
LF	18	Fridolina Rolfö	(substituted off) 46'
Substitutions:
MF	7	Madelen Janogy	(substituted in) 46'
DF	3	Linda Sembrant	(substituted in) 46'
FW	8	Lina Hurtig	(substituted in) 56'
FW	17	Ellen Wangerheim	(substituted in) 71'
MF	15	Julia Zigiotti Olme	(substituted in) 82'
Manager:
Peter Gerhardsson

GK	1	Ann-Katrin Berger
RB	5	Carlotta Wamser	(red card) 31'
CB	6	Janina Minge (c)
CB	4	Rebecca Knaak		(substituted off) 46'
LB	2	Sarai Linder	(yellow card) 56'
CM	20	Elisa Senß		(substituted off) 84'
CM	9	Sjoeke Nüsken	(yellow card) 21'	(substituted off) 77'
RW	22	Jule Brand
AM	10	Laura Freigang		(substituted off) 46'
LW	19	Klara Bühl
CF	11	Lea Schüller		(substituted off) 63'
Substitutions:
MF	8	Sydney Lohmann		(substituted in) 46'
DF	3	Kathrin Hendrich		(substituted in) 46'
FW	18	Giovanna Hoffmann		(substituted in) 63'
FW	15	Selina Cerci		(substituted in) 77'
MF	13	Sara Däbritz		(substituted in) 84'
Manager:
Christian Wück

Player of the Match:
Johanna Rytting Kaneryd (Sweden)

Assistant referees:
Francesca Di Monte (Italy)
Amina Gutschi (Austria)
Fourth official:
Alina Peşu (Romania)
Video assistant referee:
Aleandro Di Paolo (Italy)
Assistant video assistant referee:
Jelena Cvetković (Serbia)

=== Poland vs Denmark ===
12 July 2025
21:00

Poland	3–2	Denmark
Padilla 13'; Pajor 20'; Wiankowska 76'	Report	Thomsen 59'; Bruun 83'

Allmend Stadion Luzern, Lucerne
Attendance: 14,213
Referee: Olatz Rivera Olmedo (Spain)

Poland	Denmark

GK	1	Kinga Szemik
RB	6	Sylwia Matysik		(substituted off) 58'
CB	13	Emilia Szymczak
CB	5	Oliwia Woś
LB	3	Wiktoria Zieniewicz
CM	23	Adriana Achcińska		(substituted off) 65'
CM	11	Tanja Pawollek	(yellow card) 79'
CM	8	Ewelina Kamczyk		(substituted off) 82'
RF	19	Natalia Padilla
CF	9	Ewa Pajor (c)
LF	21	Paulina Tomasiak		(substituted off) 58'
Substitutions:
DF	2	Martyna Wiankowska		(substituted in) 58'
MF	15	Milena Kokosz		(substituted in) 58'
FW	16	Klaudia Jedlińska		(substituted in) 65'
MF	17	Klaudia Słowińska		(substituted in) 82'
Manager:
Nina Patalon

GK	1	Maja Bay Østergaard
CB	4	Emma Færge
CB	3	Stine Ballisager Pedersen
CB	11	Katrine Veje
RM	15	Frederikke Thøgersen		(substituted off) 82'
CM	13	Josefine Hasbo		(substituted off) 62'
CM	12	Kathrine Møller Kühl
LM	18	Sara Holmgaard		(substituted off) 62'
RF	19	Janni Thomsen
CF	20	Signe Bruun
LF	10	Pernille Harder (c)		(substituted off) 25'
Substitutions:
FW	14	Sofie Bredgaard		(substituted in) 25'
FW	9	Nadia Nadim	(yellow card) 80'	(substituted in) 62'
MF	6	Karen Holmgaard		(substituted in) 62'
FW	21	Amalie Vangsgaard		(substituted in) 82'
Manager:
(Sweden) Andrée Jeglertz

Player of the Match:
Natalia Padilla (Poland)

Assistant referees:
Eliana Fernández (Spain)
Emily Carney (England)
Fourth official:
Désirée Grundbacher (Switzerland)
Video assistant referee:
Guillermo Cuadra Fernández (Spain)
Assistant video assistant referee:
Judit Romano García (Spain)

== Discipline ==
Disciplinary points would have been used as a tiebreaker in the group if teams were tied on overall and head-to-head records, with a lower number of disciplinary points ranking higher. Points were calculated based on yellow and red cards received by players and coaches in all group matches as follows:

- first yellow card: plus 1 point;
- indirect red card (second yellow card): plus 3 points;
- direct red card: plus 3 points;
- yellow card and direct red card: plus 4 points;

Team	Match 1				Match 2				Match 3				Points
Team	Booked	(yellow card) (yellow-red card)	Sent off (straight red)	(yellow card) (red card)	Booked	(yellow card) (yellow-red card)	Sent off (straight red)	(yellow card) (red card)	Booked	(yellow card) (yellow-red card)	Sent off (straight red)	(yellow card) (red card)	Points
Sweden					1								1
Denmark	1				1				1				3
Poland	2				1				1				4
Germany					1				2		1		6
