= Matysik =

Matysik is a surname. Notable people with the surname include:

- Jörg Matysik (born 1964), German chemist and university lecturer
- Kay Matysik (born 1980), German beach volleyball player
- Larry Matysik (1947–2018), American wrestling commentator and author
- Reiner Maria Matysik (born 1967), German visual artist
- Sylwia Matysik (born 1997), Polish footballer
- Waldemar Matysik (born 1961), Polish footballer
