= 2020 Algarve Cup =

International women's football tournament

Tournament details
- Host country: Portugal
- Dates: 4–11 March
- Teams: 8 (from 2 confederations)
- Venue(s): 2 (in 2 host cities)

Final positions
- Champions: Germany (4th title)
- Runners-up: Italy
- Third place: Norway
- Fourth place: New Zealand

Tournament statistics
- Matches played: 11
- Goals scored: 29 (2.64 per match)
- Top scorer(s): four players (2 goals)

The 2020 Algarve Cup was the 27th edition of the Algarve Cup, an invitational women's football tournament held annually in Portugal. It took place from 4-11 March 2020.

The final was scratched and Germany was awarded the Algarve Cup as Italy had to fly home on 9 March due to the COVID-19 pandemic in Italy.

== Teams ==
Team	FIFA Rankings (December 2019)
Germany	2
Sweden	5
Norway	12
Italy	14
Denmark	16
Belgium	17
New Zealand	23
Portugal	31

== Draw ==
The draw took place on 7 January 2020.

== Qualification ==
All times are local (UTC±0).

4 March 2020
14:00

Denmark	1–2	Norway
Harder 7'	Report	Thorsnes 13'; Jensen 90+3'

Vista Municipal Stadium, Parchal

4 March 2020
16:30

Germany	1–0	Sweden
Huth 34'	Report

Estádio Algarve, Faro/Loulé
Attendance: 800
Referee: Ivana Martinčić (Croatia)

4 March 2020
18:00

New Zealand	1–1	Belgium
Chance 37'	Report	Vande Velde 89'
Penalties
Bowen (penalty scored); Gregorius (penalty scored); Stott (penalty scored); White (penalty scored); Moore (penalty scored); Bott (penalty missed); Longo (penalty scored); Cleverley (penalty scored)	7–6	(penalty scored) De Caigny; (penalty scored) Vanhaevermaet; (penalty scored) Cayman; (penalty scored) Evrard; (penalty scored) Wullaert; (penalty missed) Deloose; (penalty scored) De Neve; (penalty missed) Wijnants

Vista Municipal Stadium, Parchal

4 March 2020
20:15

Portugal	1–2	Italy
Silva 34'	Report	Linari 75'; Girelli 90+4'

Estádio Algarve, Faro/Loulé
Referee: Francia González (Mexico)

== Knockout stage ==
=== Bracket ===
Semi-finals
7 March, Lagos
New Zealand	0
Italy	3
7 March, Lagos
Germany	4
Norway	0

Final
11 March, Parchal
Italy
Germany	w/o
Third place
10 March
New Zealand	1
Norway	2

5–8th place semi-finals
7 March, Parchal
Belgium	1
Portugal	0
7 March, Lagos
Sweden	1
Denmark	2

Fifth place
10 March
Belgium	0
Denmark	4
Seventh place
10 March
Portugal	0
Sweden	2

=== 5–8th place semi-finals ===
7 March 2020
14:30

Sweden	1–2	Denmark
Hurtig 11'	Report	Larsen 56'; Christiansen 90+3'

Lagos Municipal Stadium, Lagos
Referee: Francia González (Mexico)
7 March 2020
17:00

Belgium	1–0	Portugal
De Caigny 65'	Report

Vista Municipal Stadium, Parchal
Referee: Emikar Calderas (Venezuela)

=== Semi-finals ===
7 March 2020
17:30

Germany	4–0	Norway
Schüller 20'; Elsig 26'; Engen 60' (o.g.); Hegering 71'	Report

Lagos Municipal Stadium, Lagos
Attendance: 300
Referee: Olga Zadinová (Czech Republic)
7 March 2020
21:00

New Zealand	0–3	Italy
	Report	Girelli 20'; Bonansea 56'; Bartoli 68'

Vista Municipal Stadium, Parchal
Referee: Ivana Martinčić (Croatia)

=== Seventh place game ===
10 March 2020
20:00

Portugal	0–2	Sweden
	Report	Jakobsson 45+2'; Rolfö 51'

Estádio Algarve, Faro/Loulé
Referee: Olga Zadinová (Czech Republic)

=== Fifth place game ===
10 March 2020
17:30

Belgium	0–4	Denmark
	Report	Harder 6'; Thomsen 13'; Christiansen 40'; Pedersen 47'

Lagos Municipal Stadium, Lagos

=== Third place game ===
10 March 2020
16:00

New Zealand	1–2	Norway
Wilkinson 10'	Report	Jensen 15'; Graham Hansen 86'

Estádio Algarve, Faro/Loulé

=== Final ===
11 March 2020
18:45

Italy	0–3 (Note: Italy withdrew from the tournament on 9 March to return home due to the COVID-19 pandemic. Germany was awarded a 3–0 victory and the Algarve Cup.)	Germany
	Report

Vista Municipal Stadium, Parchal

== Final ranking ==
Rank	Team
1st place, gold medalist(s)	Germany
2nd place, silver medalist(s)	Italy
3rd place, bronze medalist(s)	Norway
4	New Zealand
5	Denmark
6	Belgium
7	Sweden
8	Portugal

== Goalscorers ==
There were 29 goals scored in 11 matches, for an average of 2.64 goals per match.

2 goals

- (Denmark) Nanna Christiansen
- (Denmark) Pernille Harder
- (Italy) Cristiana Girelli
- (Norway) Synne Jensen

1 goal

- (Belgium) Tine De Caigny
- (Belgium) Chloe Velde
- (Denmark) Stine Larsen
- (Denmark) Stine Ballisager Pedersen
- (Denmark) Janni Thomsen
- (Germany) Johanna Elsig
- (Germany) Marina Hegering
- (Germany) Svenja Huth
- (Germany) Lea Schüller
- (Italy) Elisa Bartoli
- (Italy) Barbara Bonansea
- (Italy) Elena Linari
- (New Zealand) Olivia Chance
- (New Zealand) Hannah Wilkinson
- (Norway) Caroline Graham Hansen
- (Norway) Elise Thorsnes
- (Portugal) Diana Silva
- (Sweden) Lina Hurtig
- (Sweden) Sofia Jakobsson
- (Sweden) Fridolina Rolfö

1 own goal

- (Norway) Ingrid Syrstad Engen (playing against Germany)
