= Johanna Elsig =

German footballer (born 1992)

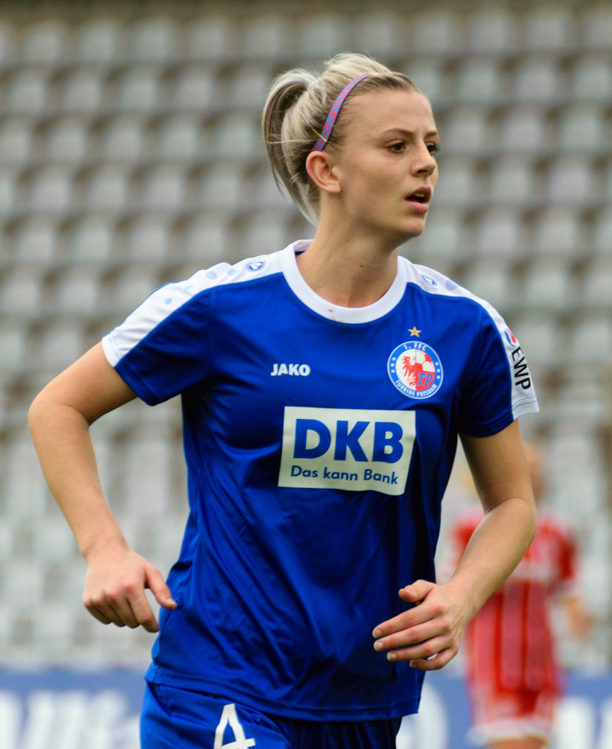

Personal information
- Full name: Johanna Elsig
- Date of birth: 1 November 1992 (age 34)
- Place of birth: Düren, Germany
- Height: 1.78 m (5 ft 10 in)
- Position: Defender

Youth career
- –2009: FC Düren-Niederau 08

Senior career*
Years	Team	Apps	(Gls)
2009–2012	Bayer 04 Leverkusen	56	(6)
2012–2021	1. FFC Turbine Potsdam II	3	(1)
2012–2021	Turbine Potsdam	137	(21)
2021–2023	Montpellier	21	(1)

International career^{‡}
2007	Germany U-15	5	(0)
2007–2008	Germany U-16	8	(2)
2008–2009	Germany U-17	8	(2)
2009–2011	Germany U-19	20	(1)
2011–2012	Germany U-20	3	(0)
2017–2020	Germany	15	(1)
- * Club domestic league appearances and goals as of 22 April 2019 ‡ National team caps and goals as of 7 March 2020

Johanna Elsig (born 1 November 1992) is a German former professional footballer who played as a defender.

== Club career ==
Johanna Elsig began her junior career at FC Düren-Niederau 08 before signing a senior contract with Bayer 04 Leverkusen in 2009. In 2012, she signed with 1. FFC Turbine Potsdam.

== International goal ==
Scores and results list Germany's goal tally first:

Elsig – goals for Germany
#	Date	Location	Opponent	Score	Result	Competition
1.	7 March 2020	Lagos, Portugal	Norway	2–0	4–0	2020 Algarve Cup

== Honours ==
1. FFC Turbine Potsdam

- DFB-Hallenpokal for women: Winner 2013, 2014

Germany U17

- UEFA Women's Under-17 Championship: Winner 2009

Germany U19

- UEFA Women's Under-19 Championship: Winner 2011

Individual

- Fritz Walter Medal: Gold 2011
