= Ilse van der Zanden =

Dutch footballer (born 1995)

Personal information
- Date of birth: 25 July 1995 (age 31)
- Place of birth: Deurne, Netherlands
- Position: Defender

Team information
- Current team: Fiorentina
- Number: 22

Youth career
- ZSV Zeilberg
- CTO Amsterdam

Senior career*
Years	Team	Apps	(Gls)
2014–2017	Telstar	19	(2)
2017–2023	DTS Ede		
2023–2025	Utrecht	42	(3)
2025–	Fiorentina	7	(0)

International career^{‡}
2009–2010	Netherlands U15	5	(2)
2009–2011	Netherlands U16	8	(0)
2010–2011	Netherlands U17	4	(0)
2013–2014	Netherlands U19	2	(1)
2024–	Netherlands	4	(0)
- * Club domestic league appearances and goals as of 6 December 2025 ‡ National team caps and goals as of 8 April 2025

Ilse van der Zanden (born 25 July 1995) is a Dutch professional footballer who plays as a defender for Italian Serie A club Fiorentina and the Netherlands national team.

== International career ==
Van der Zanden was part of the Netherlands' 23-player squad for the UEFA Women's Euro 2025 in Switzerland.
