= Poppy Soper =

Welsh association football player (born 2002)

Personal information
- Full name: Francesca Poppy Soper
- Date of birth: 4 May 2002 (age 24)
- Place of birth: Newport, Wales
- Height: 1.65 m (5 ft 5 in)
- Position: Goalkeeper

Team information
- Current team: Sheffield United

Senior career*
Years	Team	Apps	(Gls)
–2020	Cardiff City	9	(0)
2020–2022	Plymouth Argyle		(0)
	Chelsea II		(0)
2022–2024	Charlton Athletic		(0)
2023–2024	→ Ipswich Town (loan)		(0)
2024–2025	Blackburn Rovers	6	(0)
2025–2026	Rugby Borough	0	(0)
2026–	Sheffield United	0	(0)

International career^{‡}
2017–2019	Wales U17	4	(0)
2020–	Wales	0	(0)
- * Club domestic league appearances and goals as of 27 September 2025 ‡ National team caps and goals as of 22 June 2025

Poppy Soper (born 4 May 2002) is a Welsh footballer who plays as a goalkeeper for Women's Super League 2 club Sheffield United.

== Early and personal life ==
Soper grew up in Rogerstone in Newport, South Wales and attended Bassaleg School, a comprehensive in the west of Newport, Wales. Her first grassroots club was Graig Villa Dino F.C. Poppy has a law degree from Exeter University. She is a supporter of Arsenal.

== Club career ==
Soper began her career at Cardiff City, making nine appearances for the club before moving to Plymouth Argyle in 2020.

In July 2026, she joined WSL 2 team Sheffield United.

== International career ==
Soper was part of Wales' 2025 UEFA Women's Nations League squad.

Soper was called up to be part of Wales' 23-player squad for the UEFA Women's Euro 2025 in Switzerland. However, she was forced to withdraw from the squad due to an injury she received in training on 12 July, just prior to Wales' final group stage match against England, and was replaced with Soffia Kelly.
