= Janni Thomsen =

Danish footballer (born 2000)

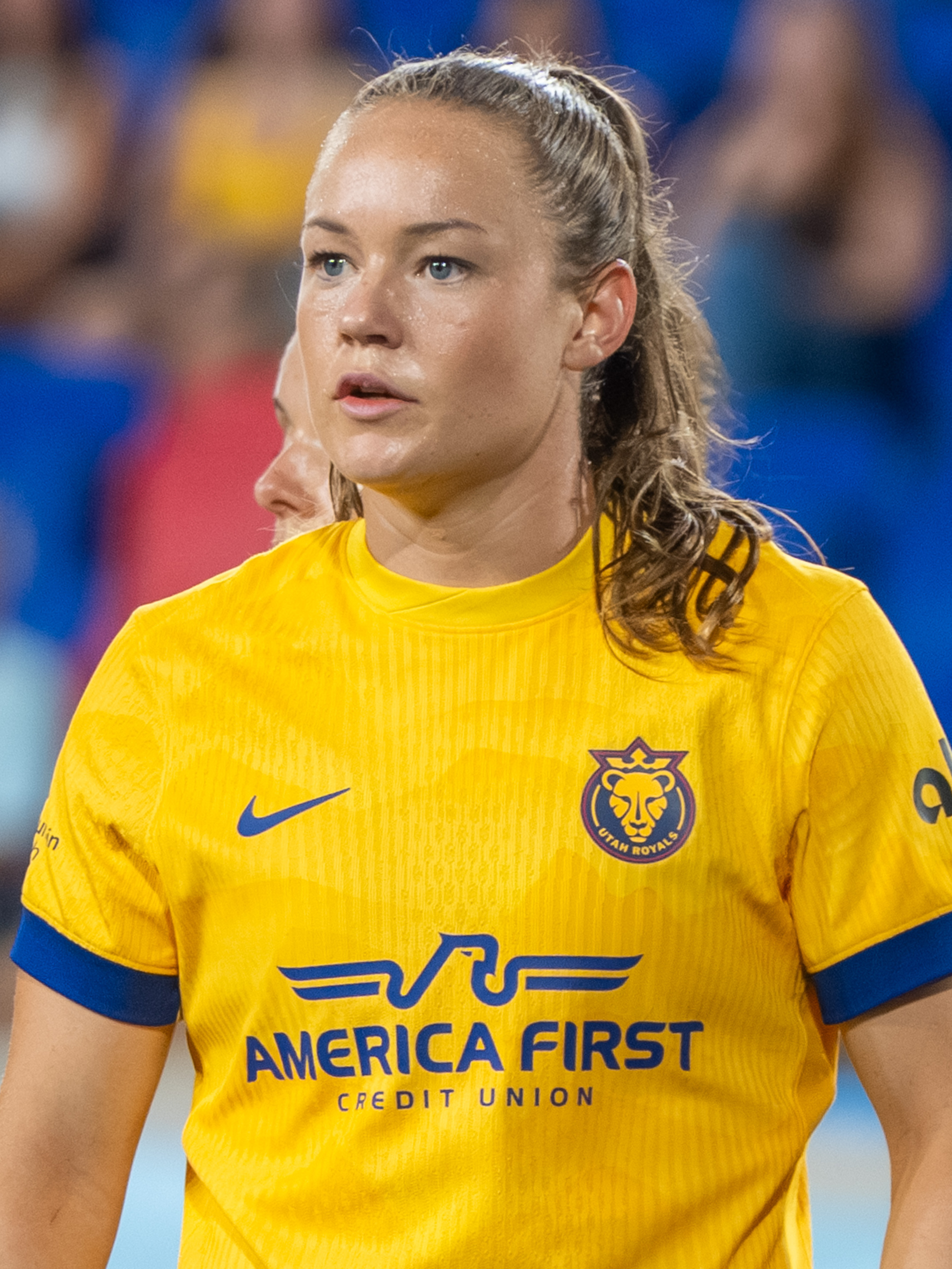
- Thomsen with the Utah Royals in 2025

Personal information
- Full name: Janni Thomsen
- Date of birth: 16 February 2000 (age 26)
- Place of birth: Kjellerup, Denmark
- Height: 1.70 m (5 ft 7 in)
- Positions: Right-back; central midfielder

Team information
- Current team: London City Lionesses
- Number: 97

Youth career
- –2017: Team Viborg

Senior career*
Years	Team	Apps	(Gls)
2017–2020	VSK Aarhus	51	(14)
2020–2024	Vålerenga	100	(15)
2025–2026	Utah Royals	37	(3)
2026–	London City Lionesses	1	(0)

International career^{‡}
2015–2016	Denmark U16	8	(2)
2016–2017	Denmark U17	10	(1)
2018–2019	Denmark U19	20	(7)
2019	Denmark U23	1	(0)
2020–	Denmark	59	(12)
- * Club domestic league appearances and goals as of 4 September 2026 ‡ National team caps and goals as of 12 October 2026

Janni Thomsen (born 16 February 2000) is a Danish professional footballer who plays as a right-back or central midfielder for Women's Super League club London City Lionesses and the Denmark national team.

== Club career ==
Thomsen played for Vålerenga for five years, recording 100 appearances with the Norwegian club. On 7 March 2025, she signed a two-year contract plus a mutual option with the Utah Royals of the NWSL.

On 3 July 2026, Thomsen signed a two-year contract with Women's Super League club London City Lionesses. On 4 September 2026, she made her first appearance in the WSL, participating in London City's season-opening win over Manchester United.

== International career ==
She made her international debut on the Danish national team on the 4 March 2020, against Norway at the 2020 Algarve Cup.

== International goals ==
=== International goals ===
As of match played 12 October 2026

Appearances and goals by national team and year
National team	Year	Apps	Goals
Denmark	2020	4	1
Denmark	2021	7	0
Denmark	2022	11	2
Denmark	2023	12	1
Denmark	2024	9	3
Denmark	2025	12	3
Denmark	2026	4	2
Total		59	12

Scores and results list Denmark's goal tally first.

No.	Date	Venue	Opponent	Score	Result	Competition
1.	10 March 2020	Lagos Municipal Stadium, Lagos, Portugal	Belgium	2–0	4–0	2020 Algarve Cup
2.	8 April 2022	Centenary Stadium, Ta'Qali, Malta	Malta	1–0	2–0	2023 FIFA Women's World Cup qualification
3.	24 June 2022	Parken Stadium, Copenhagen, Denmark	Brazil	1–0	2–1	Friendly
4.	21 February 2023	Stade Francis Le Basser, Laval, France	Uruguay	3–2	3–2	2023 Tournoi de France
5.	4 June 2024	Estadio Heliodoro Rodríguez López, Santa Cruz de Tenerife, Spain	Spain	1–0	2–3	UEFA Women's Euro 2025 qualifying
6.	4 June 2024	Estadio Heliodoro Rodríguez López, Santa Cruz de Tenerife, Spain	Spain	2–0	2–3	UEFA Women's Euro 2025 qualifying
7.	16 July 2024	Vejle Stadion, Vejle, Denmark	Czech Republic	2–0	2–0	UEFA Women's Euro 2025 qualifying
8.	25 February 2025	Stadio Alberto Picco, La Spezia, Italy	Italy	3–1	3–1	2025 UEFA Women's Nations League
9.	3 June 2025	Strawberry Arena, Solna, Sweden	Sweden	1–3	1–6	2025 UEFA Women's Nations League
10.	12 July 2025	Swissporarena, Lucerne, Switzerland	Poland	1–2	2–3	UEFA Women's Euro 2025
11.	14 April 2026	Gamla Ullevi, Gothenburg, Sweden	Sweden	2–1	2–1	2027 FIFA Women's World Cup qualification
12.	12 October 2026	BMO Field, Toronto, Canada	Canada	4–2	4–3	Friendly

== Honours ==
- Elitedivisionen
  - Bronze Medalist: 2019
