= Soffia Kelly =

Welsh footballer (born 2007)

- Kelly in 2026

Personal information
- Full name: Soffia Gabrielle Kelly
- Date of birth: 6 March 2007 (age 19)
- Place of birth: Barry, Vale of Glamorgan, Wales
- Position: Goalkeeper

Team information
- Current team: Newcastle United (on loan from Aston Villa)
- Number: 40

Senior career*
Years	Team	Apps	(Gls)
2024–	Aston Villa	0	(0)
2026–	→ Newcastle United (loan)	0	(0)

International career^{‡}
2023–2024	Wales U17	8	(0)
2023–	Wales U19	6	(0)
2024–	Wales	0	(0)
- * Club domestic league appearances and goals as of 17 July 2025 ‡ National team caps and goals as of 17 July 2025

Soffia Gabrielle Kelly (Welsh: [ˈsɔ.fi.a]; born 6 March 2007) is a Welsh footballer who plays as a goalkeeper for Women's Super League 2 club Newcastle United, on loan from Women's Super League club Aston Villa and the Wales national team.

== Youth career ==
In 2017, aged 10, Kelly joined the Wales South performance centre for girls.

In March 2021, she joined the Elite Football Welsh Academy South, as a pathway to Wales youth teams.

== Club career ==
In March 2025, Kelly signed a two year contract with Women's Super League club Aston Villa. In doing so, she became the first player to sign with the club via the academy pathway. On 25 October 2026, Kelly joined Women's Super League 2 club Newcastle United on a 2-week emergency loan.

== International career ==
In November 2023, Kelly made her debut for the Wales under-19s and England.

In March 2024, Kelly was called up to the Wales national team for UEFA Women's Euro 2025 qualifying. She received further call-ups in May 2025, for UEFA Women's Nations League matches, and in July, for Euro 2025 in Switzerland, after fellow backup goalkeeper Poppy Soper withdrew due to injury.

== Personal life ==
In November 2023, Kelly was completing a coaching qualification at Cardiff and Vale College in Barry, Wales.

In October 2024, having been bullied in school for pursuing football, she won the Child of Wales Young Leader award.

As of May 2025, Kelly is an ambassador for child safety charity Kidscape.
