= Milena Kokosz =

Polish footballer (born 2001)

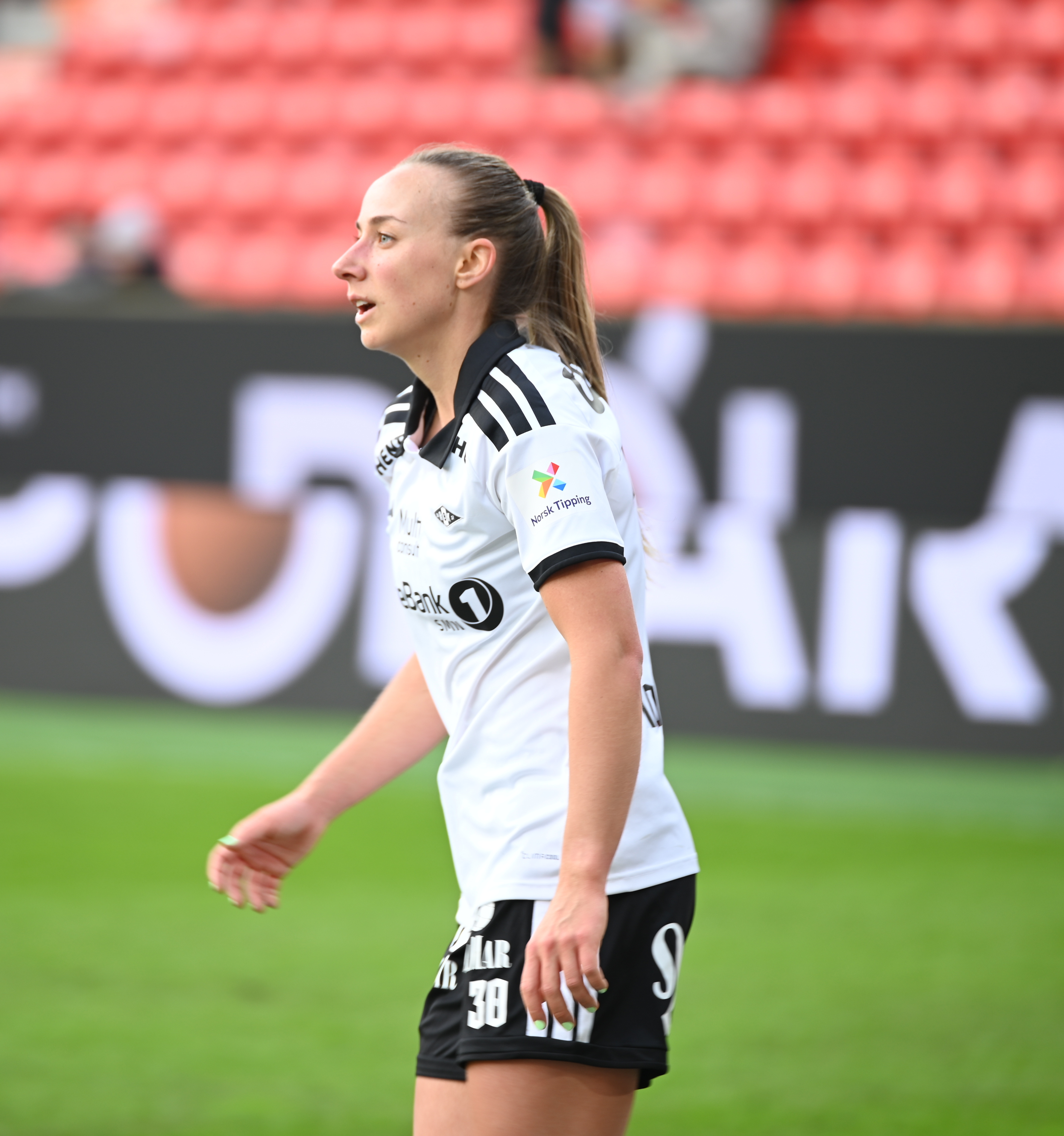
- Kokosz with Rosenborg in 2026

Personal information
- Date of birth: 16 August 2001 (age 25)
- Positions: Forward; midfielder

Team information
- Current team: Rosenborg
- Number: 30

Senior career*
| Years | Team | Apps | (Gls) |
| 2017–2020 | Åsane | 53 | (22) |
| 2020–2021 | Arna-Bjørnar | 5 | (0) |
| 2021–2025 | Åsane | 98 | (8) |
| 2025– | Rosenborg | 31 | (1) |

International career^{‡}
| 2020 | Poland U19 | 2 | (0) |
| 2024 | Poland U23 | 3 | (0) |
| 2024– | Poland | 20 | (2) |
- * Club domestic league appearances and goals as of 10:23, 6 October 2026 (UTC) ‡ National team caps and goals as of 22:36, 13 October 2026 (UTC)

Milena Kokosz (born 16 August 2001) is a Polish professional footballer who plays as a forward or a midfielder for Toppserien club Rosenborg and the Poland national team.

Komosz grew up in Choroszcz, Poland. In 2011, she moved with her parents to Bergen in Norway, where she started playing football with Eidsvåg IL, at the age of 10.

== Personal life ==
Kokosz is the granddaughter of Jerzy Kokosz, former football player for Tur Bielsk Podlaski.

== International career ==
Kokosz was named in Poland's 23-player squad for the UEFA Women's Euro 2025 in Switzerland.

== Career statistics ==
=== International ===
As of match played 13 October 2026

Appearances and goals by national team and year
| National team | Year | Apps | Goals |
|---|---|---|---|
| Poland | 2024 | 5 | 0 |
| Poland | 2025 | 8 | 2 |
| Poland | 2026 | 7 | 0 |
| Total | | 20 | 2 |

Scores and results list Poland's goal tally first, score column indicates score after each Kokosz goal.

List of international goals scored by Milena Kokosz
| No. | Date | Venue | Opponent | Score | Result | Competition |
|---|---|---|---|---|---|---|
| 1 | 27 June 2025 | Stadion Stali Mielec, Mielec, Poland | Ukraine | 4–0 | 4–0 | Friendly |
| 2 | 28 October 2025 | Rodney Parade, Newport, Wales | Wales | 2–1 | 5–2 | Friendly |
