= Denmark women's national football team =

Women's national association football team representing Denmark

Denmark
- Nickname(s): De rød-hvide (The Red and Whites)
- Association: Dansk Boldspil-Union (DBU)
- Confederation: UEFA (Europe)
- Head coach: Jakob Michelsen
- Captain: Pernille Harder
- Most caps: Katrine Pedersen (210)
- Top scorer: Pernille Harder (87)
- FIFA code: DEN
First colours	Second colours	Third colours

FIFA ranking
- Current: 10 ▲2 (20 October 2026)
- Highest: 6 (March – June 2007; March – June 2009)
- Lowest: 20 (June – August 2016)

First international
- Denmark 1–0 Sweden (Markusböle, Finland; 27 July 1974)

Biggest win
- Denmark 15–0 Georgia (Vejle, Denmark; 24 October 2009)

Biggest defeat
- United States 7–0 Denmark (Orlando, United States; 24 February 1995)

World Cup
- Appearances: 5 (first in 1991)
- Best result: Quarter-finals (1991, 1995)

European Championship
- Appearances: 11 (first in 1984)
- Best result: Runners-up (2017)
Medal record
Association football
Women's World Cup
Gold medal – first place	1971 Mexico	Team
Gold medal – first place	1970 Italy
European Championship
Silver medal – second place	2017 Netherlands	Team
Bronze medal – third place	1993 Italy	Team
Bronze medal – third place	1991 Denmark	Team

The Denmark women's national football team (Danish: Danmarks kvindefodboldlandshold) represents Denmark and Greenland in international women's football. The team is governed by the Danish Football Association (DBU) and competes as a member of UEFA in various international football tournaments such as the FIFA Women's World Cup, UEFA Women's Euro, the Summer Olympics, the Algarve Cup, and, since 2023, the new UEFA Women's Nations League.

A Danish national women's football team was not formally recognised by DBU until February 1972. The first official match was played against Sweden in Markusböle, Finland on 27 July 1974. During the era before DBU recognised women's football as legitimate, various teams were assembled independently to compete for Denmark in unofficial competitions, including the 1969 Euros, 1970 Women's World Cup and the 1971 Women's World Cup. Denmark were runners-up at the 1969 Euros held in Italy, and won both the 1970 and 1971 World Cups held in Italy and Mexico, respectively. The 1971 final in Mexico had the highest ever recorded attendance of a women's sporting event, with 112,500 spectators.

Denmark have qualified five times for the FIFA Women's World Cup and eleven times for the UEFA Women's Championship. The team's greatest official accomplishment to date was winning silver at the UEFA Women's Euro 2017, where they lost to the Netherlands. In the UEFA Women's Euro 2013, Denmark beat France to reach the semi-finals, where they lost on penalties to Norway.

In March 2007, Denmark was ranked sixth in the FIFA Women's World Rankings, reaching the highest ranking since it was introduced. The lowest ranking so far was a 20th-place finish in June 2016.

== History ==
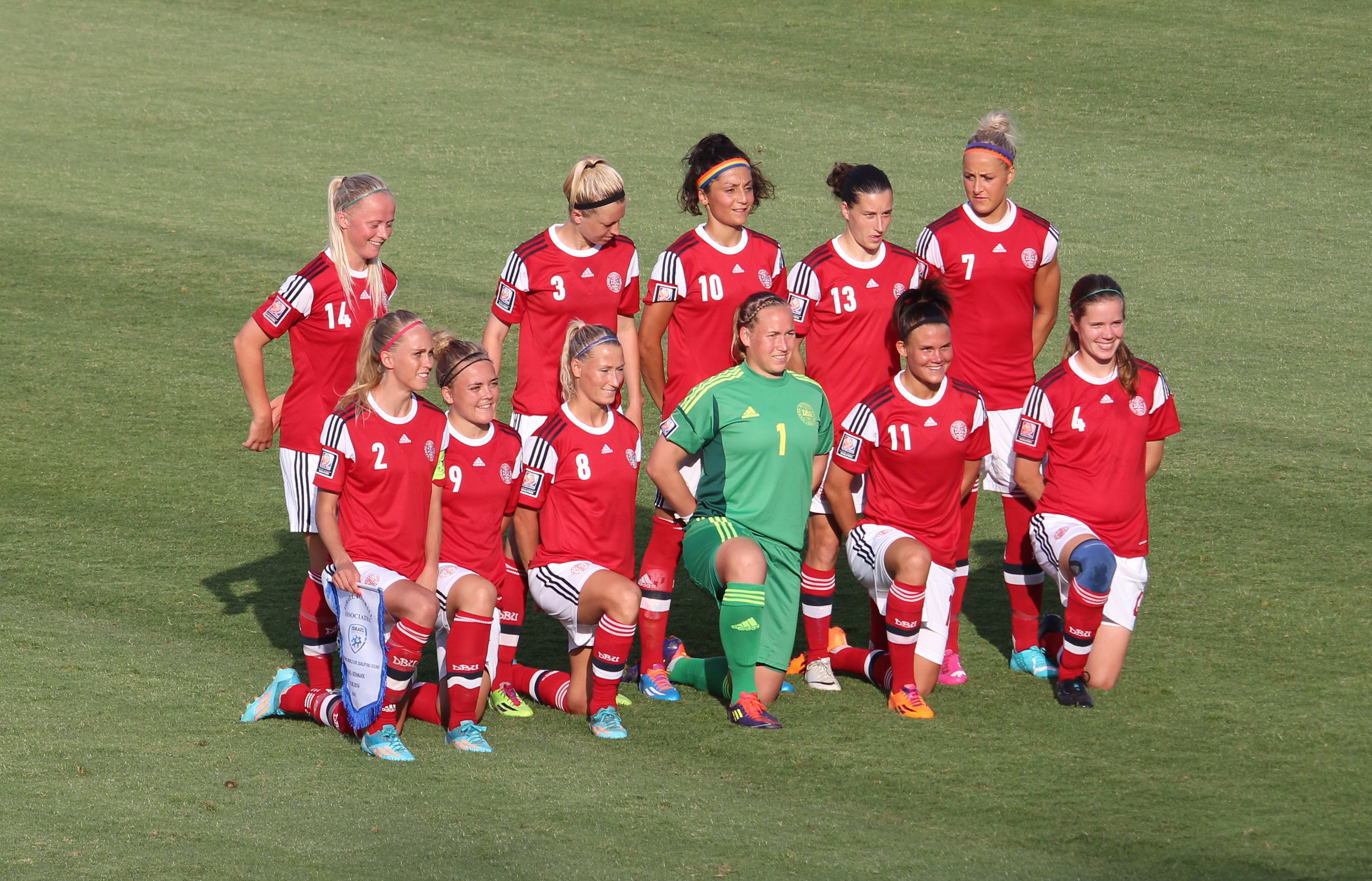
The national team in June 2014

Denmark were one of the earliest pioneers of women's football, competing in the unofficial Women's World Cup tournaments in 1970 and 1971. Denmark won both tournaments, the first ever Danish football team to win the World Cup. The final of the 1971 Women's World Cup was played at Estadio Azteca in Coyoacán, Mexico, in front of a crowd of 112,500, the record attendance for any women's sporting event.

=== 2017 Euros ===
At the UEFA Women's Euro 2017 in the Netherlands, Denmark was drawn into Group A with Netherlands, Norway and Belgium. They secured a 1–0 victories over Belgium and Norway, but lost 1–0 to Netherlands. Despite that they managed to advance as runners-up in the group, to the quarter-finals against Germany. The Danes surprisingly won against the 22-year reigning champions of Europe and qualified to the semifinals, with a 2–1 win. Denmark defeated Austria 3–0 on penalties to reach the final for the first time, after the match finished goalless. In the final the team met Netherlands at the De Grolsch Veste, Enschede, standing in front of a crowd of 28,182 spectators. The Dutch team defeated Denmark, by a 4–2 victory and claimed their first UEFA Euro title.

=== 2023 World Cup ===
Denmark were in Group D with England, China and Haiti. They lost to England and defeated China and Haiti to finish second in the group. They were eliminated in the Round of 16 when they lost 2–0 to Australia.

=== 2025 Euros ===
Qualification

Denmark was allotted Group 2 in the League A qualification due to previously competing in League A of the 2023–2024 Nations League and competed against 2023 World Cup winners Spain, as well as Belgium and Czechia. At the start of qualifying Denmark's FIFA ranking was #13, with Spain #1, Belgium #18, and Czechia #30.

Denmark won the first match away 3–1 over Czechia, where striker Amalie Vangsgaard scored a long-distance goal from 40 meters out just over the halfway-line, after spotting the Czech keeper had come out some distance from goal. The goal won the Danish Football Association (DBU) Goal of the Year award. Denmark also won their last qualifying match, the home match against Czechia, 2–0.

Denmark hosted the Spanish World Cup winners in a 2–0 defeat at Vejle Stadium. The away match in Tenerife saw Denmark take the lead after 4 minutes of play and double it in the second half, both goals by Janni Thomsen. Before the second Danish goal, keeper Maja Bay Østergaard saved a Spanish penalty taken by Mariona Caldentey. Denmark lost the match by 3–2, conceding two goals on corners in quick succession, with the winning goal scored in extra time.

The first match against Belgium, played at home, saw Denmark beat the side 4–2, albeit they were 4–0 up in the second half when Belgium managed to get two goals back to make the final result. In the first half, left wing-back Sofie Svava recorded two assists from corner set-pieces to set up Vangsgaard, before Svava scored the third goal for Denmark from open play. During the second half, Frederikke Thøgersen scored the fourth goal for Denmark from outside the box, cementing the Danish victory despite conceding two. The goal by Thøgersen was nominated for the DBU Goal of the Year award. The lead-up to the corresponding match away in Belgium saw the Belgian national team take to try and gain an advantage on Denmark, first by staying at the hotel at the grounds so Denmark could not train on the match day pitch without being watched by their opponents. The Danish team found another training location, but the Danish staff called off training as they discovered that they were being watched and recorded by individuals standing on the roof of a nearby hotel, who were later confirmed to be part of the Belgian team staff. The Belgian Football Association (Belgian FA) admitted to these actions and issued an apology to the Danish association. UEFA did not sanction the Belgian FA nor were any other actions taken to penalise the Belgian FA for spying. Denmark won the match 3–0 to qualify for the 2025 Euros.

Nations League and Euros lead-up

Denmark competed in League A of the 2025 Nations League, so allotted based on their performance in the Euro 2025 qualifying matches. The tournament was only scheduled to take place within the calendar year. Denmark competed against Sweden, Italy, and Wales. At the start of the tournament in February, Denmark's FIFA ranking was #12, with Sweden #5, Italy #13, and Wales #30.

Denmark won both matches against Wales, and the away match against Italy 3–1. Despite this, Denmark showed a tendency to stumble when faced with adversity during matches, most notably in the 3–0 loss at home to Italy, and the 6–1 dismantling away against Sweden on 6 June. The Sweden match was a crucial game in Denmark's bid for staying in League A, following the loss to Italy. It was the last game of the Nations League campaign, and the final game before Denmark's first group match in the 2025 Euros, also against Sweden. The loss saw Denmark place 3rd overall in their group, thus facing play-off matches that September to avoid relegation to League B.

In the lead-up to the match, media speculation about Denmark coach Jeglertz's departure following the Euros intensified, culminating the day before the match where several outlets reported that Danish coach Jakob Michelsen was slated to be the new Denmark coach. Due to the scrutiny, the Danish Football Association (DBU) confirmed the rumours only hours before the match regarding Jeglertz's departure from the post, the handling of which was met with criticism. The players were informed on the day of the match as well, hours before the official confirmation from DBU. The scale of the loss to Sweden saw the media post-match question whether the news surrounding Jeglertz's departure had impacted performance, which both the players and Jeglertz rejected.

On 20 June, the 23 player-squad for the 2025 Euros was selected. The announcement was made with a selection video featuring winners from the 1971 Women's World Cup and players from the men's team. The selection saw the return of Nadia Nadim after a lengthy absence, for what was later reported to be her final appearances for the national team, as well as forward Rikke Madsen and midfielder Karen Holmgaard, the latter returning from a two-year absence from the national team due to injury. The omission of Lyon player Sofie Svava, playing at the club with the highest Opta Sports-rating among the Danish internationals, (Note: As of July 2025, OL Lyonnes is ranked as the third best club in the world) was possibly the biggest surprise of the selection. Svava's agent told the press that it was "a joke" that she was not called up considering her merits and talent, and dismissed what Jeglertz had given as the reasoning, that the team needed a more defensive setup, citing that Svava faces the best attackers in the world playing at Lyon.

On 3 July, less than 24 hours before Denmark's first Euro 2025 match, longstanding rumours of Jeglertz taking a position as manager of Manchester City were confirmed.

Tournament

Denmark performed poorly in the tournament, losing all three group stage games and departing the Euros following the group stage. Denmark faced Sweden in the first group stage match on Friday 4 July, in Denmark's first competitive match following the 6–1 defeat to Sweden in Stockholm a month prior. Denmark lined up in a 3-4-2-1, with Frederikke Thøgersen, Emma Færge and Karen Holmgaard returning to the starting eleven. Sweden were dominant throughout the match, but had trouble breaking through the Danish defence. Keeper Bay saved a direct free-kick from Filippa Angeldahl in the first half. Angeldahl scored early in the second half, and Thøgersen saved a shot from Blackstenius on the goal line. Denmark did not create many chances, albeit Pernille Harder hit the crossbar with a left-footed shot on goal, and Denmark lost to Sweden 1-0. The following match against Germany saw Denmark take the lead with a goal by Amalie Vangsgaard, but the second half was marked by a serious head injury to Emma Snerle as the referee did not stop play as is safety protocol, which was heavily criticised, especially as the referee already failed to stop play for a head injury in the first half. Said action led to the winning goal for Germany, the match ending 2–1 which saw Denmark exit the tournament. Denmark lost their final match against Poland 3–2. This was the last appearance for Nadia Nadim with the national team, after recording 20 total appearances at the Euros, the most for the any player.

== Home stadium ==
The women's national team does not currently have its own home grounds. From 2015 until 2024, the team played at Energi Viborg Arena, located in Viborg, which has a maximum capacity of 10,000. Since the agreement between the Danish Football Association and Viborg Municipality expired in the summer of 2024, the women's team has been playing matches at various venues around the country.

The highest number of spectators for a women's international match on Danish soil was set on 24 June 2022 at an exhibition match against Brazil in Parken Stadium, Copenhagen, where 21,542 attended. The previous record attendance of 9,337 spectators was set during 2007 FIFA Women's World Cup qualifying against Finland at Viborg Stadium on 27 September 2006.

== Results and fixtures ==
The following is a list of match results in the last 12 months, as well as any future matches that have been scheduled.

Legend

Win Draw Loss Fixture

=== 2025 ===
1 December Friendly	Norway	0–0	Denmark	La Línea, Spain
18:00 UTC+1				Stadium: Estadio Municipal de La Línea

=== 2026 ===
3 March 2027 FIFA Women's World Cup qualification	Denmark	3–1	Serbia	Horsens, Denmark
18:00 UTC+1	Bredgaard 13'; Vangsgaard 19'; Harder 64' (pen.)	Report	Stokić 40'	Stadium: Forum Horsens Stadium; Attendance: 2,814; Referee: Abigail Byrne (England)

7 March 2027 FIFA Women's World Cup qualification	Italy	1–1	Denmark	Vicenza, Italy
18:15 UTC+1	Piemonte 19'	Report	Holdt 63'	Stadium: Stadio Romeo Menti; Attendance: 5,278; Referee: Désirée Blanco (Switzerland)

14 April 2027 FIFA Women's World Cup qualification	Sweden	1–2	Denmark	Gothenburg, Sweden
19:00 UTC+2	Jusu Bah 8'	Report (FIFA); Report (UEFA)	Harder 30'; Thomsen 90+2'	Stadium: Gamla Ullevi; Attendance: 12,573; Referee: Ivana Martinčić (Croatia)

18 April 2027 FIFA Women's World Cup qualification	Denmark	0–0	Italy	Copenhagen, Denmark
15:00 UTC+2		Report (FIFA); Report (UEFA)		Stadium: Parken Stadium; Attendance: 12,013; Referee: Emanuela Rusta (Albania)

5 June 2027 FIFA Women's World Cup qualification	Denmark	2–1	Sweden	Odense, Denmark
19:15 UTC+2	Fløe 25'; Harder 30'	Report	Rytting Kaneryd 52'	Stadium: Odense Stadium; Attendance: 5,902; Referee: Stéphanie Frappart (France)

9 June 2027 FIFA Women's World Cup qualification	Serbia	1–4	Denmark	Stara Pazova, Serbia
19:00 UTC+2	Poljak 15'	Report (FIFA); Report (UEFA)	Fløe 8'; Vangsgaard 14', 42'; Harder 40' (pen.)	Stadium: Serbian FA Sports Center; Referee: Rasa Grigonė (Lithuania)

9 October Friendly	Canada	1–1	Denmark	Montreal, Canada
19:00 UTC−4	Smith 84'	Report	Harder 24'	Stadium: Stade Saputo; Attendance: 10,187; Referee: Priscila Pérez (Mexico)

12 October Friendly	Canada	3–4	Denmark	Toronto, Canada
15:30 UTC−4	Pridham 10'; Viens 49'; Smith 70'	Report	Holdt 23', 32'; Harder 27'; Thomsen 61'	Stadium: BMO Field

5 December Friendly	Denmark	v	Zambia	Esbjerg, Denmark
14:00 UTC+1				Stadium: Esbjerg Stadium

== Management ==
=== Coaching ===
As of 19 November 2026

Role	Name
Head Coach	(Denmark) Jakob Michelsen
Assistant Coach	(Denmark) Johanna Rasmussen
Goalkeeping Coach	(Denmark) Søren Holm
Fitness Coach	(France) Yannick Durand
Match Analyst	(Denmark) Maja Lindqvist
Team Manager	(Denmark) Cecilia Di Nardo
Kit Manager	(Denmark) Janne Madsen

Medical staff
Role	Name
Team Doctor	(Denmark) Jens Lykkegaard Olesen
Physiotherapists	(Denmark) Rikke Holm Brink (Denmark) Morten Bastholm (Denmark) Morten Stampe

=== Managers ===
As of 12 October 2026

Manager	Debut	Departure	Record					Notes
Manager	Debut	Departure	G	W	D	L	W %	Notes
(Denmark) Kent Falkenvig	1974	1976	4	4	0	0	100.00	
(Denmark) Bjørn Basbøll	1976	1981	29	18	7	4	62.07	1979 Euros (unofficial) – (gold) Champions
(Denmark) Flemming Schultz	1982	1984	15	7	4	4	46.67	
(Denmark) Birger Peitersen	1985	1987	17	8	4	5	47.06	
(Denmark) Keld Gantzhorn	1988	1996	87	44	14	29	50.57	
(Denmark) Jørgen Hvidemose	1996	1999	34	14	8	12	41.18	
(Denmark) Poul Højmose (Note: In 2001 Højmose became the first ever full-time Coach for the Women's National Team.)	1 July 1999	31 March 2005	72	31	10	31	43.06	2001 Euros – Semi-finals.
(Denmark) Peter Bonde	1 April 2005	2006	18	9	4	5	50.00	
(Denmark) Kenneth Heiner-Møller	August 2006	August 2013	101	51	19	31	50.50	2007 World Cup — Group stage 2009 Euros — Group stage 2013 Euros — Semi-finals
(Denmark) Nils Nielsen	September 2013	24 August 2017	57	26	12	19	45.61	2017 Euros — (silver) Silver medalists.
(Denmark) Søren Randa-Boldt	25 August 2017	31 December 2017	2	2	0	0	100.00	interim
(Denmark) Lars Søndergaard	1 January 2018	August 2023	63	37	4	22	58.73	2022 Euros — Group stage 2023 World Cup — Round of 16
(Sweden) Andrée Jeglertz	August 2023	30 July 2025	25	13	1	11	52.00	2025 Euros – Group stage
(Denmark) Jakob Michelsen	1 August 2025	2028 (+1)	11	7	4	0	63.64	2027 World Cup – Qualified
(Denmark) Johanna Rasmussen (caretaker)	24 October 2025		1	1	0	0	100.00	
Total			534	270	90	174	50.56	

== Players ==
=== Current squad ===
The following players were called up for the friendly match against Zambia on 5 December 2026.

Caps and goals correct as of 12 October 2026, after the match against Canada.

No.	Pos.	Player	Date of birth (age)	Caps	Goals	Club
	GK	Maja Bay Østergaard	28 March 1998 (age 28)	22	0	(Swedish Football Association) Växjö
	GK	Freja Thisgaard	24 July 2002 (age 24)	10	0	(Danish Football Association) Fortuna Hjørring
	GK	Isabella Damm	8 April 2008 (age 18)	0	0	(The Football Association) Arsenal
	DF	Frederikke Thøgersen	24 July 1995 (age 31)	98	3	(Italian Football Federation) Roma
	DF	Stine Ballisager (vice-captain)	3 January 1994 (age 32)	83	4	(German Football Association) Bayern Munich
	DF	Stine Sandbech	24 January 1996 (age 30)	80	22	(Swedish Football Association) Häcken
	DF	Sofie Svava	11 August 2000 (age 26)	66	5	(Italian Football Federation) Como 1907
	DF	Sara Thrige	15 May 1996 (age 30)	32	2	(Royal Dutch Football Association) PSV Eindhoven
	DF	Isabella Bryld Obaze	30 October 2002 (age 24)	16	1	(United States Soccer Federation) Portland Thorns
	DF	Sofie Vendelbo	9 February 2000 (age 26)	1	0	(Danish Football Association) Midtjylland
	MF	Janni Thomsen	16 February 2000 (age 26)	59	12	(The Football Association) London City Lionesses
	MF	Kathrine Kühl	5 July 2003 (age 23)	59	3	(Royal Spanish Football Federation) Atlético Madrid
	MF	Sofie Bredgaard	18 January 2002 (age 24)	28	3	(Italian Football Federation) Fiorentina
	MF	Mille Gejl	23 September 1999 (age 27)	47	7	(Danish Football Association) HB Køge
	MF	Josefine Hasbo	20 November 2001 (age 24)	39	3	(United States Soccer Federation) Boston Legacy
	MF	Olivia Holdt	7 June 2001 (age 25)	14	4	(The Football Association) Tottenham Hotspur
	MF	Anna Walter	21 April 2004 (age 22)	5	0	(Swedish Football Association) Hammarby
	MF	Mila Bischoff	1 July 2009 (age 17)	0	0	(Danish Football Association) Brøndby
	FW	Pernille Harder (captain)	15 November 1992 (age 34)	175	87	(German Football Association) Bayern Munich
	FW	Nadia Nadim	2 January 1988 (age 38)	108	38	(Danish Football Association) HB Køge
	FW	Amalie Vangsgaard	29 November 1996 (age 29)	49	14	(The Football Association) Aston Villa
	FW	Caroline Møller	19 December 1998 (age 27)	22	0	(Portuguese Football Federation) Benfica
	FW	Cecilie Fløe	8 October 2001 (age 25)	10	2	(German Football Association) VfL Wolfsburg
	FW	Nikoline Nielsen	12 August 2009 (age 17)	0	0	(Royal Spanish Football Federation) Barcelona B

=== Recent call-ups ===
The following players have also been called up to the squad within the past 12 months.

Pos.	Player	Date of birth (age)	Caps	Goals	Club	Latest call-up
GK	Alberte Vingum	14 November 2004 (age 22)	2	0	(Denmark) HB Køge	v. Canada, 12 October 2026
GK	Lene Christensen ^{INJ}	4 February 2000 (age 26)	31	0	(Sweden) Hammarby	v. Serbia, 9 June 2026
GK	Amanda Brunholt	30 March 1995 (age 31)	0	0	(Switzerland) BSC YB	v. Finland, 28 October 2025
DF	Simone Boye	3 March 1992 (age 34)	100	5	(Denmark) HB Køge	v. Canada, 12 October 2026
DF	Selma Svendsen	21 June 2001 (age 25)	1	0	(Sweden) Djurgårdens	v. Canada, 12 October 2026
DF	Carli Scheuer	14 May 2007 (age 19)	1	0	(Denmark) Nordsjælland	v. Canada, 12 October 2026
DF	Emma Færge ^{INJ}	6 December 2000 (age 25)	20	1	(Italy) Fiorentina	v. Canada, 10 October 2026
DF	Sara Holmgaard ^{INJ}	28 January 1999 (age 27)	31	4	(Spain) Real Madrid	v. Serbia, 9 June 2026
MF	Emma Snerle	23 March 2001 (age 25)	49	3	(Italy) Fiorentina	v. Canada, 12 October 2026
MF	Emilie Fink	30 September 2004 (age 22)	1	0	(Denmark) Brøndby	v. Canada, 12 October 2026
MF	Pernille Sanvig	26 November 2005 (age 20)	1	0	(Sweden) Häcken	v. Canada, 12 October 2026
MF	Sofie Junge Pedersen ^{INJ}	24 April 1992 (age 34)	89	7	(Denmark) Fortuna Hjørring	v. Serbia, 9 June 2026
MF	Rikke Madsen	9 August 1997 (age 29)	33	1	(Denmark) HB Køge	v. Serbia, 9 June 2026
MF	Karen Holmgaard ^{INJ}	28 January 1999 (age 27)	38	3	(England) Everton	v. Norway, 1 December 2025
MF	Karoline Olesen	3 February 2005 (age 21)	0	0	(Sweden) Malmö	v. Norway, 1 December 2025
FW	Cornelia Kramer	16 December 2002 (age 23)	7	1	(Germany) Bayer Leverkusen	v. Canada, 12 October 2026
Notes: ^{INJ} = Withdrew due to injury; ^{RET} = Retired from the national team; ^{WD} = Player withdrew from the squad due to non-injury issue

=== Previous squads ===
FIFA Women's World Cup

- World Cup 1991 squad
- World Cup 1995 squad
- World Cup 1999 squad
- World Cup 2007 squad
- World Cup 2023 squad

UEFA Women's Euro

- Euro 1984 squad
- Euro 1991 squad
- Euro 1993 squad
- Euro 1997 squad
- Euro 2001 squad
- Euro 2005 squad
- Euro 2009 squad
- Euro 2013 squad
- Euro 2017 squad
- Euro 2022 squad
- Euro 2025 squad

Olympic Games

- Olympics 1996 squad

Unofficial matches

- World Cup 1971 squad

== Player records ==
As of 12 October 2026

Players in bold are still active with the national team.

=== Most appearances ===
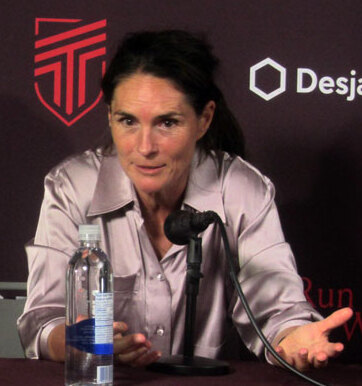
Katrine Pedersen is the player with the most caps for the national team, recording 210 appearances for Denmark.

Rank	Player	Career	Caps	Goals
1	Katrine Pedersen	1994–2013	210	9
2	Sanne Troelsgaard	2008–2025	197	57
3	**Pernille Harder**	2009–present	175	87
4	**Katrine Veje**	2009–present	171	9
5	Johanna Rasmussen	2002–2018	153	41
6	Merete Pedersen	1993–2009	136	65
7	Theresa Eslund	2008–2020	133	5
8	Line Røddik Hansen	2006–2017	132	13
9	Cathrine Paaske-Sørensen	2000–2010	121	36
10	Anne Dot Eggers Nielsen	1993–2007	118	26

=== Top goalscorers ===
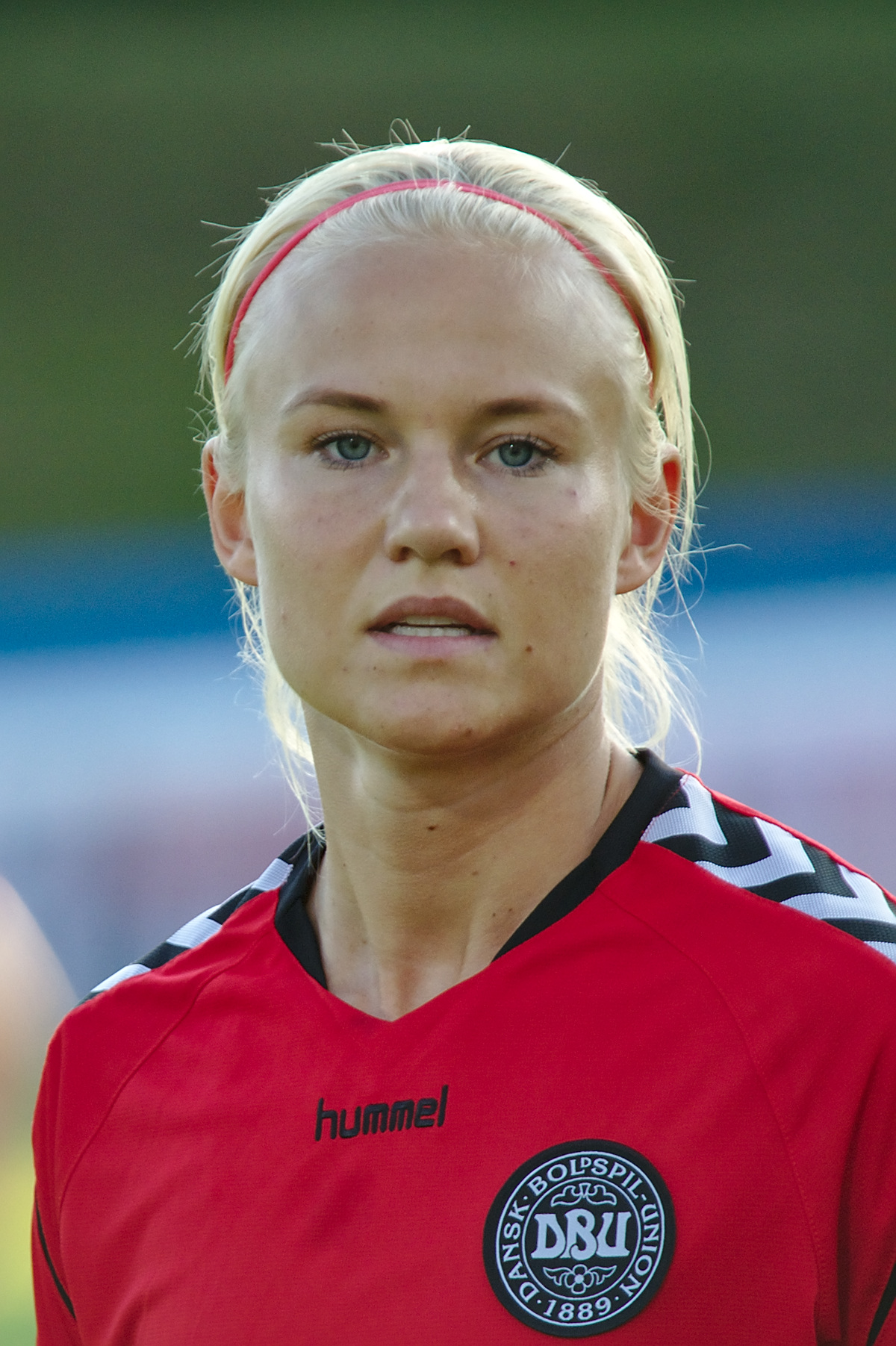
Team captain Pernille Harder is the Danish all-time top scorer with 86 goals in 174 appearances for Denmark.

Rank	Player	Career	Goals	Caps	Avg.
1	**Pernille Harder**	2009–present	87	175	0.50
2	Merete Pedersen	1993–2009	65	136	0.48
3	Sanne Troelsgaard	2008–2025	57	197	0.29
4	Gitte Krogh	1994–2001	46	90	0.51
5	Johanna Rasmussen	2002–2018	41	153	0.27
6	Helle Jensen	1987–1996	38	77	0.49
6	Nadia Nadim	2009–2025	38	108	0.35
8	Cathrine Paaske-Sørensen	2000–2010	36	121	0.30
9	Lene Jensen	1996–2010	26	109	0.24
9	Anne Dot Eggers Nielsen	1993–2007	26	118	0.22

== Competitive records ==
=== FIFA Women's World Cup ===
FIFA Women's World Cup record									Qualification record						
Year	Result	Pld	W	D*	L	GF	GA	GD	Pld	W	D*	L	GF	GA	GD
(China) 1991	Quarter-finals	4	1	1	2	7	6	+1	UEFA Euro 1991						
(Sweden) 1995	Quarter-finals	4	1	0	3	7	8	−1	UEFA Euro 1995						
(United States) 1999	Group stage	3	0	0	3	1	8	−7	6	6	0	0	22	3	+19
(United States) 2003	Did not qualify								8	5	1	2	22	11	+11
(China) 2007	Group stage	3	1	0	2	4	4	0	8	6	1	1	22	6	+16
(Germany) 2011	Did not qualify								12	6	4	2	49	7	+42
(Canada) 2015	Did not qualify								10	5	3	2	25	6	+19
(France) 2019	Did not qualify								10	5	1	4	23	12	+11
(Australia) (New Zealand) 2023	Round of 16	4	2	0	2	3	3	0	8	8	0	0	40	2	+38
(Brazil) 2027	Qualified								6	4	2	0	12	5	+7
(Costa Rica) (Jamaica) (Mexico) (United States) 2031	To be determined								To be determined						
(United Kingdom) 2035	To be determined								To be determined						
Total	6/10	18	5	1	12	22	29	−7	62	41	10	11	203	47	+156

*Draws include knockout matches decided on penalty kicks.

==== Match History ====
FIFA Women's World Cup Finals history
Year	Round	Date	Opponent	Result	Stadium
(China) 1991	Group stage	17 November	New Zealand	W 3–0	Tianhe Stadium, Guangzhou
(China) 1991	Group stage	19 November	China	D 2–2	Guangdong Provincial Stadium, Guangzhou
(China) 1991	Group stage	21 November	Norway	L 1–2	Ying Dong Stadium, Panyu
(China) 1991	Quarter-finals	24 November	Germany	L 1–2 (aet)	Zhongshan Stadium, Zhongshan
(Sweden) 1995	Group stage	6 June	Australia	W 5–0	Arosvallen, Västerås
(Sweden) 1995	Group stage	8 June	United States	L 0–2	Strömvallen, Gävle
(Sweden) 1995	Group stage	10 June	China	L 1–3	Arosvallen, Västerås
(Sweden) 1995	Quarter-finals	13 June	Norway	L 1–3	Tingvallen, Karlstad
(United States) 1999	Group stage	19 June	United States	L 0–3	Giants Stadium, East Rutherford
(United States) 1999	Group stage	24 June	North Korea	L 1–3	Civic Stadium, Portland
(United States) 1999	Group stage	27 June	Nigeria	L 0–2	Jack Kent Cooke Stadium, Landover
(China) 2007	Group stage	12 September	China	L 2–3	Wuhan Stadium, Wuhan
(China) 2007	Group stage	15 September	New Zealand	W 2–0	Wuhan Stadium, Wuhan
(China) 2007	Group stage	20 September	Brazil	L 0–1	Yellow Dragon Sports Center, Hangzhou
(Australia) (New Zealand) 2023	Group stage	22 July	China	W 1–0	Perth Rectangular Stadium, Perth
(Australia) (New Zealand) 2023	Group stage	28 July	England	L 0–1	Sydney Football Stadium, Sydney
(Australia) (New Zealand) 2023	Group stage	1 August	Haiti	W 2–0	Perth Rectangular Stadium, Perth
(Australia) (New Zealand) 2023	Round of 16	7 August	Australia	L 0–2	Stadium Australia, Sydney

=== Olympic Games record ===
Olympic Games record
Year	Result	GP	W	D*	L	GF	GA
(United States) 1996	Group stage	3	0	0	3	2	11
(Australia) 2000	Did not qualify						
(Greece) 2004	Did not qualify						
(China) 2008	Did not qualify						
(United Kingdom) 2012	Did not qualify						
(Brazil) 2016	Did not qualify						
(Japan) 2020	Did not qualify						
(France) 2024	Did not qualify						
Total	1/8	3	0	0	3	2	11

=== UEFA Women's Championship ===
UEFA Women's Championship record								Qualifying record							
Year	Result	P	W	D*	L	GF	GA	P	W	D*	L	GF	GA	P/R	Rnk
1984	Semi-finals	2	0	0	2	1	3	6	3	2	1	8	5	–	
(Norway) 1987	Did not qualify							6	2	2	2	10	10	–	
(West Germany) 1989	Did not qualify							8	5	1	2	14	12	–	
(Denmark) 1991	Third place	2	1	1	0	2	1	8	6	2	0	19	2	–	
(Italy) 1993	Third place	2	1	0	1	3	2	6	4	2	0	17	4	–	
(England) (Germany) (Norway) (Sweden) 1995	Did not qualify							6	5	0	1	34	4	–	
(Norway) (Sweden) 1997	Group stage	3	0	1	2	2	9	8	6	0	2	26	6	–	
(Germany) 2001	Semi-finals	4	2	0	2	6	6	8	5	0	3	32	15	–	
(England) 2005	Group stage	3	1	1	1	4	4	8	7	1	0	26	4	–	
(Finland) 2009	Group stage	3	1	0	2	3	4	8	7	0	1	23	5	–	
(Sweden) 2013	Semi-finals	5	0	4	1	5	6	8	7	0	1	28	3	–	
(Netherlands) 2017	Runners-up	6	3	1	2	6	6	8	6	1	1	22	1	–	
(England) 2022	Group stage	3	1	0	2	1	5	10	9	1	0	48	1	–	
(Switzerland) 2025	Group stage	3	0	0	3	3	6	6	4	0	2	14	8	(Note: From Euro 2025 onwards a new qualifying format was introduced, linked to the Women's Nations League where teams are divided into leagues with promotion/relegation between the leagues at the end of each cycle.)	6th
(Germany) 2029															
Total	11/14	36	10	8	18	36	52	104	76	12	16	321	80	6th	

=== UEFA Women's Nations League ===
UEFA Women's Nations League record
League phase												Finals							
Season	LG	Grp	Pos	Pld	W	D	L	GF	GA	P/R	RK	Year	Pos	Pld	W	D	L	GF	GA
2023–24	A	3	2nd	6	4	0	2	10	6	Same position	6th	(Europe) 2024	Did not qualify						
2025	A	4	3rd	8	5	0	3	16	14	*	9th	(N/A) 2025	Did not qualify						
Total				14	9	0	5	26	20	6th and 9th		Total	–	–	–	–	–	–	–

▲	Promoted at end of season
Same position	No movement at end of season
▼	Relegated at end of season
*	Participated in promotion/relegation play-offs

=== Algarve Cup record ===
Year	Result	Matches	Wins	Draws	Losses	GF	GA
1994	Fourth place	3	1	0	2	2	7
1995	Runners-up	4	3	0	1	12	3
1996	Fourth place	4	2	0	2	7	5
1997	Fourth place	4	2	1	1	6	4
1998	Runners-up	4	2	1	1	9	4
1999	Fourth place	4	1	2	1	8	5
2000	Sixth place	4	1	0	3	5	6
2001	Runners-up	4	2	0	2	8	5
2002	Sixth place	4	1	0	3	4	7
2003	Ninth place	4	1	1	2	2	5
2004	Seventh place	4	1	0	3	1	3
2005	Sixth place	4	1	0	3	6	9
2006	Ninth place	4	1	1	2	6	13
2007	Runners-up	4	2	0	2	5	5
2008	Runners-up	4	3	0	1	4	2
2009	Third place	4	3	0	1	5	2
2010	Fifth place	4	2	0	2	4	8
2011	Sixth place	4	1	0	3	2	4
2012	Fifth place	4	2	0	2	4	8
2013	Seventh place	4	1	2	1	3	2
2014	Sixth place	4	1	1	2	6	7
2015	Sixth place	4	1	1	2	7	10
2016	Seventh place	4	2	0	2	6	7
2017	Third place	4	2	1	1	13	3
2018	Tenth place	4	0	2	2	3	5
2019	Sixth place	3	1	0	2	2	3
2020	Fifth place	3	2	0	1	7	3
2022	Fifth place	1	0	0	1	0	1
Total	26/26	102	44	11	49	132	141

=== Invitational trophies ===
- Women's Nordic Football Championship: Winner 1974, 1975, 1976, 1982

=== World Cup (Old invitational event) ===
- 1970 : Champions (non-official competition)
- 1971 : Champions (non-official competition)
- 1981 : Runners-up (non-official competition)
- 1984 : Did not participate (non-official competition)
- 1985 : Third Place (non-official competition)
- 1986 : Did not participate (non-official competition)
- 1988 : Did not participate (non-official competition)

=== European Championship (Unofficial events) ===
- 1969 : Runner-up (non-official competition)
- 1979 : Champions (non-official competition)

== Honours ==
=== Major competitions ===
- UEFA Women's Euro
  - Runners-up: 2017

=== Non-FIFA competitions ===
- FIEFF Women's World Cup
  - Winners (2): 1970, 1971

=== Hall of Fame ===
The Danish Football Association Hall of Fame was created in 2006 to celebrate the achievements and contributions of outstanding Danish players and staff. The inductees are selected by a jury consisting of six people; the current team have two representatives from DBU, two former players, and two media persons. In 2016, 10 years after its inception, the first female footballer was inducted into the Hall of Fame. It was a double induction, with also the second ever female player awarded the honour. In 2023, 17 years after the Hall of Fame was created, the first female jury member - 2022 inductee Katrine Pedersen - was invited to join.

#	Recipient	Year	Notes
1	Susanne Augustesen (1971)	2016	
2	Lone Smidt Nielsen (1977–1988)	2016	
3	1971 World Cup Team	2019	(gold) winning team at the unofficial World Cup.
4	Katrine Pedersen (1994–2013)	2022	Pedersen is the first and only woman to become a jury member.
5	Helle Jensen (1987–1996)	2024	
6	Merete Pedersen (1994–2009)	2024	
7	Poul Højmose (1999–2005)	2025	Højmose was the first full-time coach for the women's national team.
8	Karina Sefron and Bonny Madsen (1988–1998)	2026	

== See also ==
- List of Denmark women's international footballers
- Denmark women's national football team results
- Denmark women's national under-19 football team
- Denmark women's national under-17 football team
