= Maja Bay Østergaard =

Danish footballer (born 1998)

Personal information
- Date of birth: 28 March 1998 (age 28)
- Place of birth: Silkeborg, Denmark
- Height: 1.71 m (5 ft 7 in)
- Position: Goalkeeper

Team information
- Current team: Växjö DFF
- Number: 1

Senior career*
Years	Team	Apps	(Gls)
- Vildbjerg SF
2018–2023	FC Thy-Thisted Q	122	(0)
2024–	Växjö DFF	6	(0)

International career^{‡}
2016–2017	Denmark U19	2	(0)
2023–	Denmark	20	(0)
- * Club domestic league appearances and goals as of 13 May 2024 ‡ National team caps and goals as of 8 July 2025

Maja Bay Østergaard (born 28 March 1998) is a Danish professional footballer who plays as a goalkeeper for Damallsvenskan club Växjö DFF and the Denmark national team.

== Club career ==
Østergaard was the winner of the Danish Women's Cup with FC Thy-Thisted Q in 2020/2021, and won the player of the tournament award. She was the runner up of the Danish Women's Cup with FC Thy-Thisted Q in 2021/2022 and 2019/2020.

== International career ==
Østergaard has represented Denmark at youth level. She received her first call-up to the Denmark national team in March 2022. She made her debut on 18 February 2023 in a 2–0 win against Norway.

== Career statistics ==
=== International ===
As of match played 8 July 2025

Appearances and goals by national team and year
National team	Year	Apps	Goals
Denmark	2023	2	0
Denmark	2024	10	0
Denmark	2025	8	0
Total		20	0
