= Emma Færge =

Danish footballer (born 2000)

Personal information
- Full name: Emma Skou Færge
- Date of birth: 6 December 2000 (age 25)
- Place of birth: Herning, Denmark
- Height: 1.72 m (5 ft 8 in)
- Position: Defender

Team information
- Current team: Fiorentina
- Number: 44

Youth career
- Videbæk IF
- Vildbjerg SF

Senior career*
Years	Team	Apps	(Gls)
2017–2018	Vildbjerg SF		
2018–2021	Kolding IF	66	(4)
2021–2023	HB Køge	46	(2)
2023–	Fiorentina	25	(0)

International career^{‡}
2015–2016	Denmark U16	8	(0)
2016–2017	Denmark U17	10	(0)
2017–2019	Denmark U19	17	(0)
2023	Denmark U23	4	(0)
2022–	Denmark	12	(1)
- * Club domestic league appearances and goals as of 6 May 2024 ‡ National team caps and goals as of 8 April 2025

Emma Skou Færge (born 6 December 2000) is a Danish footballer who plays as a defender for Italian Serie A club Fiorentina and the Denmark national team.

== Club career ==
Færge started her career with Vildbjerg SF. After that, she signed for Kolding Q. In 2021, she signed for HB Køge. On 7 August 2021 she made her debut for HB Køge in a 3–1 home win over Thisted FC. Her first goal followed on 2 October 2021 in a 4–0 home win over Fortuna Hjørring.

In July 2023, she signed a three-year contract with the Italian major club ACF Fiorentina in Serie A until the summer of 2026. On 16 September 2023, she made her debut for Fiorentina in a 2–1 home win over US Sassuolo Calcio.

== International career ==
She has previously played for the U16, U17, and U19 national teams. She took part in the qualification for the 2017 European Championships with the U17s. The U19s qualified for the 2019 European Championship, where she played in a few games.

On 12 June 2022, she made her debut for the senior national team in a training match against Austria. She came on as a substitute for Simone Boye Sørensen in the 82nd minute and won the game 2–1.

== International goals ==
Scores and results list Færge goal's tally first.

No.	Date	Venue	Opponent	Score	Result	Competition
1.	25 February 2025	Stadio Alberto Picco, La Spezia, Italy	Italy	1–0	3–1	2025 UEFA Women's Nations League
