= Sylwia Matysik =

Polish footballer (born 1997)

Personal information
- Date of birth: 20 May 1997 (age 29)
- Place of birth: Poland
- Height: 1.72 m (5 ft 8 in)
- Position: Defender

Team information
- Current team: Hamburger SV
- Number: 14

Youth career
- –2010: Grom Wolsztyn
- 2010–2013: Medyk Konin

Senior career*
Years	Team	Apps	(Gls)
2013–2015	Medyk Konin		
2015–2017	AZS Wrocław		
2017–2020	Górnik Łęczna	65	(21)
2020–2024	Bayer Leverkusen	60	(0)
2024–2026	1. FC Köln	22	(0)
2026–	Hamburger SV	3	(0)

International career^{‡}
2013–2014	Poland U17	14	(3)
2014–2015	Poland U19	5	(1)
2015–	Poland	67	(0)
Medal record
Representing Poland
Women's football
UEFA Women's Under-17 Championship
Winner	2013 Switzerland
- * Club domestic league appearances and goals as of 21:21, 21 November 2026 (UTC) ‡ National team caps and goals as of 21:37, 12 July 2025 (UTC)

Sylwia Matysik (born 20 May 1997) is a Polish professional footballer who plays as a defender for Frauen-Bundesliga club Hamburger SV and the Poland national team.

== Career ==
Matysik has been capped for the Poland national team, appearing for the team during multiple qualifying cicles, and at the UEFA Women's Euro 2025.

== Career statistics ==
=== International ===
As of match played 12 July 2025

Appearances and goals by national team and year
National team	Year	Apps	Goals
Poland	2015	6	0
Poland	2016	6	0
Poland	2017	1	0
Poland	2018	7	0
Poland	2019	7	0
Poland	2020	2	0
Poland	2021	8	0
Poland	2022	5	0
Poland	2023	10	0
Poland	2024	9	0
Poland	2025	6	0
Total		67	0

== Honours ==
Medyk Konin

- Ekstraliga: 2013–14, 2014–15
- Polish Cup: 2014–15

Górnik Łęczna

- Ekstraliga: 2017–18, 2018–19, 2019–20
- Polish Cup: 2017–18, 2019–20

Poland U17

- UEFA Women's Under-17 Championship: 2013
