= Zenia Mertens =

Belgian footballer

Personal information
- Date of birth: 27 February 2001 (age 25)
- Place of birth: Belgium
- Height: 1.65 m (5 ft 5 in)
- Positions: Midfielder; defender

Team information
- Current team: RB Leipzig
- Number: 4

Senior career*
Years	Team	Apps	(Gls)
2017–2026	OH Leuven	100	(10)
2026–	RB Leipzig	5	(0)

International career^{‡}
2021–	Belgium	18	(1)
- * Club domestic league appearances and goals as of 22:34, 8 October 2026 (UTC) ‡ National team caps and goals as of 22:10, 15 October 2026 (UTC)

Zenia Mertens (born 27 February 2001) is a Belgian professional footballer who plays as a defender and midfielder for Frauen-Bundesliga club RB Leipzig and the Belgium national team.

== Club career ==
Mertens made her debut for Oud-Heverlee Leuven in a 3–0 home loss to Gent on 30 August 2020. Mertens finished runners-up in the Belgian Women's Super League three seasons in a row with OH Leuven, in 2020-21, 2021–22 and 2022–23. Leuven went on to finish top of the regular season for the 2023-24 campaign, but finished third in the title play-offs as Anderlecht came from behind to take the crown for a seventh season in a row.

Mertens was contracted to OH Leuven until 2026.

== International career ==
Mertens made her debut for the Belgium national team on 10 June 2021, coming on as a substitute for Chloë Vande Velde against Spain.

At the start of 2022, Mertens helped Belgium win the Pinatar Cup in Spain for the first time, beating Russia on penalties in the final after a 0–0 draw.

Mertens went on to contribute to Belgium's successful qualification for UEFA Women's Euro 2025 via the play-offs, and was selected in the squad for both legs of the play-off final against Ukraine.

On 11 June 2025, Mertens was called up to the Belgium squad for the UEFA Women's Euro 2025.

== Career statistics ==
=== International ===
As of match played 13 October 2026

Appearances and goals by national team and year
National team	Year	Apps	Goals
Belgium
Belgium	2021	3	0
Belgium	2022	0	0
Belgium	2023	0	0
Belgium	2024	1	0
Belgium	2025	6	0
Belgium	2026	8	1
Total		18	1

Scores and results list Belgium's goal tally first, score column indicates score after each Mertens goal.

List of international goals scored by Zenia Mertens
No.	Date	Venue	Opponent	Score	Result	Competition
1	7 March 2026	BSC Stadium, Budaörs, Hungary	Israel	3–0	5–0	2027 FIFA Women's World Cup qualification

== Honours ==
Belgium

- Pinatar Cup: 2022
