= UEFA Women's Euro 2022 Group D =

Football tournament group stage

Group D of UEFA Women's Euro 2022 was played from 10 to 18 July 2022. The pool was made up of France, Italy, Belgium and Iceland. Iceland drew all their matches and became the first undefeated team not to advance to the quarter-finals.

== Teams ==
Draw position	Team	Pot	Method of qualification	Date of qualification	Finals appearance	Last appearance	Previous best performance	UEFA Rankings October 2021 (Note: The UEFA rankings of October 2021 were used for seeding for the final draw.)	FIFA Rankings June 2022
D1	France	1	Group G winner	27 November 2020	7th	2017	Quarter-finals (2009, 2013, 2017)	4	3
D2	Italy	2	Group B runners-up	24 February 2021	12th	2017	Runners-up (1993, 1997)	8	14
D3	Belgium	3	Group H winner	1 December 2020	2nd	2017	Group stage (2017)	10	19
D4	Iceland	4	Group F runners-up	1 December 2020	4th	2017	Quarter-finals (2013)	13	17

== Standings ==
Pos	Team	Pld	W	D	L	GF	GA	GD	Pts	Qualification
1	France	3	2	1	0	8	3	+5	7	Advance to knockout stage
2	Belgium	3	1	1	1	3	3	0	4	Advance to knockout stage
3	Iceland	3	0	3	0	3	3	0	3	
4	Italy	3	0	1	2	2	7	−5	1	

Source: UEFA
Rules for classification: Group stage tiebreakers

== Matches ==
=== Belgium vs Iceland ===
10 July 2022
17:00

Belgium	1–1	Iceland
Vanhaevermaet 67' (pen.)	Report	Þorvaldsdóttir 50'

Academy Stadium, Manchester
Attendance: 3,859
Referee: Tess Olofsson (Sweden)

Belgium	Iceland

GK	1	Nicky Evrard
RB	15	Jody Vangheluwe
CB	19	Sari Kees
CB	18	Laura De Neve
LB	2	Davina Philtjens	(yellow card) 32'
DM	10	Justine Vanhaevermaet	(yellow card) 86'
CM	11	Janice Cayman
CM	20	Julie Biesmans
AM	6	Tine De Caigny
CF	13	Elena Dhont		(substituted off) 78'
CF	9	Tessa Wullaert (c)		(substituted off) 90+3'
Substitutions:
FW	7	Hannah Eurlings		(substituted in) 78'
FW	3	Ella Van Kerkhoven		(substituted in) 90+3'
Manager:
Ives Serneels

GK	1	Sandra Sigurðardóttir
RB	2	Sif Atladóttir
CB	4	Glódís Perla Viggósdóttir
CB	18	Guðrún Arnardóttir
LB	11	Hallbera Guðný Gísladóttir
CM	5	Gunnhildur Yrsa Jónsdóttir
CM	10	Dagný Brynjarsdóttir
CM	7	Sara Björk Gunnarsdóttir (c)	(substituted off) 86'
RF	8	Karólína Lea Vilhjálmsdóttir	(substituted off) 90+1'
CF	9	Berglind Björg Þorvaldsdóttir	(substituted off) 72'
LF	23	Sveindís Jane Jónsdóttir
Substitutions:
FW	21	Svava Rós Guðmundsdóttir	(substituted in) 72'
MF	17	Agla María Albertsdóttir	(substituted in) 86'
MF	15	Alexandra Jóhannsdóttir	(substituted in) 90+1'
Manager:
Þorsteinn Halldórsson

Player of the Match:
Sveindís Jane Jónsdóttir (Iceland)

Assistant referees:
Almira Spahić (Sweden)
Franca Overtoom (Netherlands)
Fourth official:
Ivana Projkovska (North Macedonia)
Video assistant referee:
Pol van Boekel (Netherlands)
Assistant video assistant referee:
Dennis Higler (Netherlands)

=== France vs Italy ===
10 July 2022
20:00

France	5–1	Italy
Geyoro 9', 40', 45'; Katoto 12'; Cascarino 38'	Report	Piemonte 76'

New York Stadium, Rotherham
Attendance: 8,541
Referee: Rebecca Welch (England)

France	Italy

GK	21	Pauline Peyraud-Magnin
RB	22	Ève Périsset
CB	5	Aïssatou Tounkara
CB	3	Wendie Renard (c)
LB	7	Sakina Karchaoui	(substituted off) 87'
CM	8	Grace Geyoro	(substituted off) 67'
CM	14	Charlotte Bilbault
CM	6	Sandie Toletti
RF	11	Kadidiatou Diani	(substituted off) 77'
CF	9	Marie-Antoinette Katoto	(substituted off) 77'
LF	20	Delphine Cascarino	(substituted off) 67'
Substitutions:
FW	12	Melvine Malard	(substituted in) 67'
MF	15	Kenza Dali	(substituted in) 67'
FW	18	Ouleymata Sarr	(substituted in) 77'
DF	13	Selma Bacha	(substituted in) 77'
FW	17	Sandy Baltimore	(substituted in) 87'
Manager:
Corinne Diacre

GK	1	Laura Giuliani
RB	13	Elisa Bartoli
CB	3	Sara Gama (c)	(yellow card) 66'
CB	5	Elena Linari
LB	17	Lisa Boattin	(yellow card) 16'
CM	4	Aurora Galli		(substituted off) 46'
CM	6	Manuela Giugliano		(substituted off) 46'
CM	18	Arianna Caruso		(substituted off) 74'
RF	2	Valentina Bergamaschi
CF	10	Cristiana Girelli		(substituted off) 58'
LF	11	Barbara Bonansea		(substituted off) 81'
Substitutions:
MF	8	Martina Rosucci		(substituted in) 46'
MF	7	Flaminia Simonetti	(yellow card) 52'	(substituted in) 46'
FW	19	Valentina Giacinti		(substituted in) 58'
FW	20	Martina Piemonte		(substituted in) 74'
DF	16	Lucia Di Guglielmo		(substituted in) 81'
Manager:
Milena Bertolini

Player of the Match:
Grace Geyoro (France)

Assistant referees:
Sian Massey-Ellis (England)
Lisa Rashid (England)
Fourth official:
Lorraine Watson (Scotland)
Video assistant referee:
Chris Kavanagh (England)
Assistant video assistant referee:
Tiago Martins (Portugal)

=== Italy vs Iceland ===
14 July 2022
17:00

Italy	1–1	Iceland
Bergamaschi 62'	Report	Vilhjálmsdóttir 3'

Academy Stadium, Manchester
Attendance: 4,029
Referee: Lina Lehtovaara (Finland)

Italy	Iceland

GK	1	Laura Giuliani
RB	16	Lucia Di Guglielmo
CB	3	Sara Gama (c)		(substituted off) 58'
CB	5	Elena Linari
LB	17	Lisa Boattin
RM	2	Valentina Bergamaschi	(yellow card) 60'
CM	7	Flaminia Simonetti
CM	8	Martina Rosucci
LM	18	Arianna Caruso		(substituted off) 46'
CF	20	Martina Piemonte		(substituted off) 52'
CF	19	Valentina Giacinti		(substituted off) 85'
Substitutions:
FW	11	Barbara Bonansea		(substituted in) 46'
FW	10	Cristiana Girelli		(substituted in) 52'
DF	13	Elisa Bartoli		(substituted in) 58'
FW	9	Daniela Sabatino		(substituted in) 85'
Manager:
Milena Bertolini

GK	1	Sandra Sigurðardóttir
RB	3	Elísa Viðarsdóttir
CB	4	Glódís Perla Viggósdóttir
CB	18	Guðrún Arnardóttir
LB	11	Hallbera Guðný Gísladóttir	(substituted off) 88'
CM	5	Gunnhildur Yrsa Jónsdóttir	(substituted off) 57'
CM	10	Dagný Brynjarsdóttir
CM	7	Sara Björk Gunnarsdóttir (c)	(substituted off) 77'
RF	23	Sveindís Jane Jónsdóttir
CF	9	Berglind Björg Þorvaldsdóttir	(substituted off) 57'
LF	8	Karólína Lea Vilhjálmsdóttir	(substituted off) 88'
Substitutions:
MF	15	Alexandra Jóhannsdóttir	(substituted in) 57'
MF	17	Agla María Albertsdóttir	(substituted in) 57'
FW	21	Svava Rós Guðmundsdóttir	(substituted in) 77'
MF	14	Selma Sól Magnúsdóttir	(substituted in) 88'
DF	19	Áslaug Munda Gunnlaugsdóttir	(substituted in) 88'
Manager:
Þorsteinn Halldórsson

Player of the Match:
Barbara Bonansea (Italy)

Assistant referees:
Karolin Kaivoja (Estonia)
Chrysoula Kourompylia (Greece)
Fourth official:
Iuliana Demetrescu (Romania)
Video assistant referee:
Tiago Martins (Portugal)
Assistant video assistant referee:
Luís Godinho (Portugal)

=== France vs Belgium ===
14 July 2022
20:00

France	2–1	Belgium
Diani 6'; Mbock Bathy 41'	Report	Cayman 36'

New York Stadium, Rotherham
Attendance: 8,173
Referee: Cheryl Foster (Wales)

France	Belgium

GK	21	Pauline Peyraud-Magnin
RB	22	Ève Périsset
CB	19	Griedge Mbock Bathy
CB	3	Wendie Renard (c)
LB	7	Sakina Karchaoui
CM	8	Grace Geyoro	(substituted off) 90+1'
CM	14	Charlotte Bilbault
CM	10	Clara Matéo	(substituted off) 65'
RF	11	Kadidiatou Diani	(substituted off) 65'
CF	9	Marie-Antoinette Katoto	(substituted off) 17'
LF	20	Delphine Cascarino	(substituted off) 90+1'
Substitutions:
FW	18	Ouleymata Sarr	(substituted in) 17'
DF	13	Selma Bacha	(substituted in) 65'
MF	6	Sandie Toletti	(substituted in) 65'
MF	2	Ella Palis	(substituted in) 90+1'
FW	12	Melvine Malard	(substituted in) 90+1'
Manager:
Corinne Diacre

GK	1	Nicky Evrard
RB	15	Jody Vangheluwe		(substituted off) 46'
CB	19	Sari Kees
CB	18	Laura De Neve		(substituted off) 70'
LB	2	Davina Philtjens		(substituted off) 59'
CM	10	Justine Vanhaevermaet		(substituted off) 59'
CM	6	Tine De Caigny
CM	20	Julie Biesmans
RF	13	Elena Dhont		(substituted off) 78'
CF	9	Tessa Wullaert (c)
LF	11	Janice Cayman
Substitutions:
MF	16	Marie Minnaert		(substituted in) 46'
DF	22	Laura Deloose		(substituted in) 59'
MF	8	Féli Delacauw	(yellow card) 90+5'	(substituted in) 59'
DF	4	Amber Tysiak	(yellow card) 82' (yellow-red card) 89'	(substituted in) 70'
FW	7	Hannah Eurlings		(substituted in) 78'
Manager:
Ives Serneels

Player of the Match:
Delphine Cascarino (France)

Assistant referees:
Michelle O'Neill (Republic of Ireland)
Polyxeni Irodotou (Cyprus)
Fourth official:
Lorraine Watson (Scotland)
Video assistant referee:
Tomasz Kwiatkowski (Poland)
Assistant video assistant referee:
Bartosz Frankowski (Poland)

=== Iceland vs France ===
18 July 2022
20:00

Iceland	1–1	France
Brynjarsdóttir 90+12' (pen.)	Report	Malard 1'

New York Stadium, Rotherham
Attendance: 7,392
Referee: Jana Adámková (Czech Republic)

Iceland	France

GK	1	Sandra Sigurðardóttir
RB	20	Guðný Árnadóttir		(substituted off) 88'
CB	4	Glódís Perla Viggósdóttir
CB	6	Ingibjörg Sigurðardóttir
LB	11	Hallbera Guðný Gísladóttir		(substituted off) 60'
CM	7	Sara Björk Gunnarsdóttir (c)		(substituted off) 60'
CM	10	Dagný Brynjarsdóttir
AM	8	Karólína Lea Vilhjálmsdóttir	(yellow card) 64'
RF	23	Sveindís Jane Jónsdóttir		(substituted off) 60'
CF	9	Berglind Björg Þorvaldsdóttir	(yellow card) 38'
LF	17	Agla María Albertsdóttir		(substituted off) 81'
Substitutions:
FW	21	Svava Rós Guðmundsdóttir		(substituted in) 60'
DF	19	Áslaug Munda Gunnlaugsdóttir		(substituted in) 60'
MF	5	Gunnhildur Yrsa Jónsdóttir		(substituted in) 60'
MF	22	Amanda Andradóttir		(substituted in) 81'
FW	16	Elín Metta Jensen		(substituted in) 88'
Manager:
Þorsteinn Halldórsson

GK	21	Pauline Peyraud-Magnin
RB	4	Marion Torrent
CB	5	Aïssatou Tounkara
CB	3	Wendie Renard (c)
LB	13	Selma Bacha		(substituted off) 63'
CM	6	Sandie Toletti		(substituted off) 63'
CM	14	Charlotte Bilbault		(substituted off) 46'
CM	10	Clara Matéo
RF	11	Kadidiatou Diani		(substituted off) 46'
CF	12	Melvine Malard		(substituted off) 79'
LF	17	Sandy Baltimore
Substitutions:
FW	20	Delphine Cascarino		(substituted in) 46'
MF	2	Ella Palis		(substituted in) 46'
DF	7	Sakina Karchaoui	(yellow card) 90+3'	(substituted in) 63'
MF	8	Grace Geyoro		(substituted in) 63'
FW	18	Ouleymata Sarr		(substituted in) 79'
Manager:
Corinne Diacre

Player of the Match:
Melvine Malard (France)

Assistant referees:
Lucie Ratajová (Czech Republic)
Mária Súkeníková (Slovakia)
Fourth official:
Lorraine Watson (Scotland)
Video assistant referee:
Tiago Martins (Portugal)
Assistant video assistant referee:
Chris Kavanagh (England)

=== Italy vs Belgium ===
18 July 2022
20:00

Italy	0–1	Belgium
	Report	De Caigny 49'

Academy Stadium, Manchester
Attendance: 3,919
Referee: Ivana Martinčić (Croatia)

Italy	Belgium

GK	1	Laura Giuliani
RB	16	Lucia Di Guglielmo		(substituted off) 46'
CB	13	Elisa Bartoli
CB	5	Elena Linari
LB	17	Lisa Boattin	(yellow card) 65'
RM	2	Valentina Bergamaschi		(substituted off) 80'
CM	7	Flaminia Simonetti		(substituted off) 68'
CM	8	Martina Rosucci		(substituted off) 58'
LM	6	Manuela Giugliano
SS	11	Barbara Bonansea
CF	10	Cristiana Girelli (c)		(substituted off) 80'
Substitutions:
FW	14	Agnese Bonfantini		(substituted in) 46'
MF	18	Arianna Caruso		(substituted in) 58'
FW	19	Valentina Giacinti		(substituted in) 68'
MF	21	Valentina Cernoia		(substituted in) 80'
FW	9	Daniela Sabatino		(substituted in) 80'
Manager:
Milena Bertolini

GK	1	Nicky Evrard
RB	15	Jody Vangheluwe	(substituted off) 66'
CB	19	Sari Kees
CB	20	Julie Biesmans
LB	2	Davina Philtjens
CM	11	Janice Cayman	(substituted off) 90+2'
CM	10	Justine Vanhaevermaet
CM	6	Tine De Caigny
RF	13	Elena Dhont	(substituted off) 59'
CF	7	Hannah Eurlings	(substituted off) 66'
LF	9	Tessa Wullaert (c)
Substitutions:
MF	16	Marie Minnaert	(substituted in) 59'
DF	22	Laura Deloose	(substituted in) 66'
MF	8	Féli Delacauw	(substituted in) 66'
MF	23	Kassandra Missipo	(substituted in) 90+2'
Manager:
Ives Serneels

Player of the Match:
Sari Kees (Belgium)

Assistant referees:
Sanja Rođak-Karšić (Croatia)
Staša Špur (Slovenia)
Fourth official:
Ivana Projkovska (North Macedonia)
Video assistant referee:
Pol van Boekel (Netherlands)
Assistant video assistant referee:
Dennis Higler (Netherlands)

== Discipline ==
Fair play points will be used as tiebreakers in the group if the overall and head-to-head records of teams were tied. These are calculated based on yellow and red cards received in all group matches as follows:

- first yellow card: plus 1 point;
- indirect red card (second yellow card): plus 3 points;
- direct red card: plus 4 points;
- yellow card and direct red card: plus 5 points;

Team	Match 1				Match 2				Match 3				Points
Team	Booked	(yellow card) (yellow-red card)	Sent off (straight red)	(yellow card) (red card)	Booked	(yellow card) (yellow-red card)	Sent off (straight red)	(yellow card) (red card)	Booked	(yellow card) (yellow-red card)	Sent off (straight red)	(yellow card) (red card)	Points
France									1				−1
Iceland									2				−2
Italy	3				1				1				−5
Belgium	2				1	1							−6
