= Sarah Wijnants =

Belgian footballer

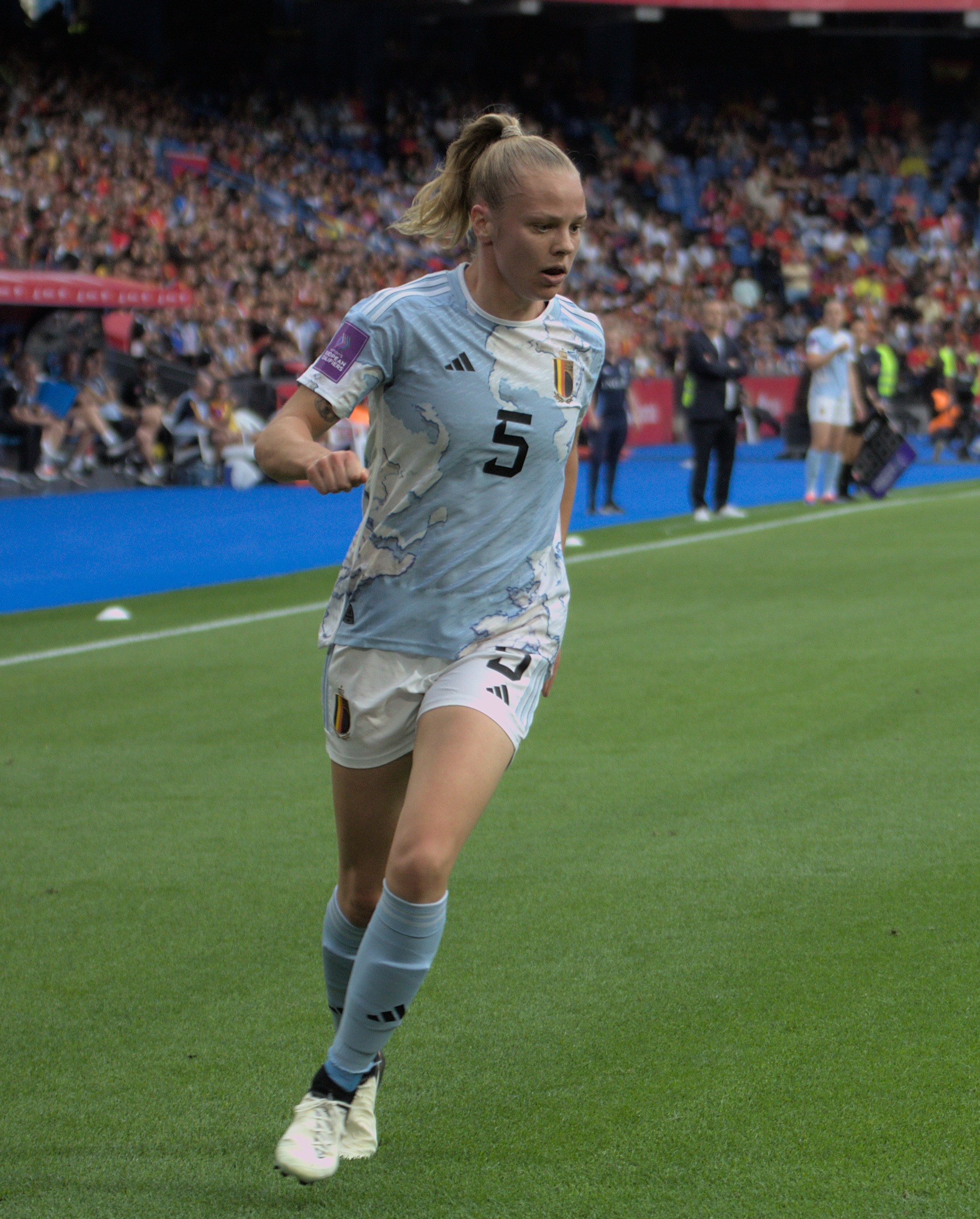
- Wijnants with Belgium in 2024

Personal information
- Full name: Sarah Wijnants
- Date of birth: October 13, 1999 (age 27)
- Place of birth: Leuven, Belgium
- Height: 1.69 m (5 ft 7 in)
- Position: Forward

Team information
- Current team: Fiorentina
- Number: 11

Youth career
- –2014: NS Tervuren

Senior career*
Years	Team	Apps	(Gls)
2014–2017	Standard Liège		
2017–2025	Anderlecht	224	(95)
2025–	Fiorentina	3	(0)

International career^{‡}
2014	Belgium U15	1	(0)
2014–2015	Belgium U16	5	(0)
2014–2016	Belgium U17	14	(3)
2016–2017	Belgium U19	12	(1)
2017–	Belgium	42	(3)
- * Club domestic league appearances and goals as of 6 December 2025 ‡ National team caps and goals as of 26 October 2025

Sarah Wijnants (born 13 October 1999) is a Belgian footballer who plays as a forward for Serie A Femminile club Fiorentina and the Belgium women's national football team (also known as the Belgian Red Flames). She has won nine league titles in a row in Belgium, the first two with Standard Liege and the rest with Anderlecht.

== Club career ==
Wijnants started her career in the youth structure at NS Tervuren. In 2014, she moved to Belgian Women's Super League side Standard Liège, making her UEFA Champions League debut on 10 October 2015 against Frankfurt. Standard lost 6–0.

Wijnants won back-to-back league titles with Standard in 2015–16 and 2016–17, departing at the end of the latter season to go to Anderlecht.

Wijnants immediately won seven league titles in a row with Anderlecht, sweeping the Belgian Women's Super League from the 2017–18 season right through to 2023–24, earning Wijnants in total nine Belgian league titles in a row.

After Anderlecht were finally denied the title in 2025 by Oud-Heverlee Leuven, Wijnants moved to Serie A Femminile club Fiorentina, her first move abroad from Belgium.

== International career ==
=== Youth ===
Wijnants played her first game with the Flames U15 on 26 March 2014 against the Netherlands. The game was lost 0–6. The same year, she played for the Flames U16 and U17. She made her first cap for the U16 team on a tournament in Magglingen, Switzerland, against Croatia. The game was won 0–4. Her last game for the U16 team was on 7 May 2015 against Norway in Castro Verde, Portugal.

On 6 October 2014 she made her first cap with the U17 in a 3–0 victory against Latvia on which she scored the opening goal. This was the first goal as an international. She played in total 14 games and was able to score three goals. She played her last game for the U17 on 29 March 2015 against England, the game was lost 2–0. In 2016 she made her first cap for the U19 in a match against Ireland and won with 2–1. The friendly game was played in Tubize, Belgium, on 19 September.

=== Senior ===
Wijnants made her first senior appearance in a friendly match against France in Clairefontaine on 19 January 2017. She played 10 minutes and the game ended with a 1–2 victory. The Red Flames were invited to participate in the Cyprus Cup. Wijnants did not make the selection at first but was called up as a replacement for Laura de Neve who had sustained an injury.

Belgium's first appearance at the Women's European Championships, their group stage exit at Euro 2017, came too early for Wijnants, but she was selected for the Red Flames' subsequent run to the quarter-finals at Euro 2022, where she did not score but did help Belgium out of their group for the first time ever.

In their second appearance at the continental finals, the Red Flames finished second in Group D behind group favourites France, against whom they conceded a narrow defeat (1–2), but ahead of Iceland with a 1–1 draw and Italy, who they edged out 1–0. Belgium lost 1–0 to Sweden in the quarter-finals.

At the start of 2022, Wijnants helped Belgium win the Pinatar Cup in Spain for the first time, beating Russia 7–6 on penalties in the final after a 0–0 draw. Wijnants scored Belgium's first successful penalty in the series, after the first had been missed by Davina Philtjens.

She contributed to Belgium's successful qualification for UEFA Women's Euro 2025 via the play-offs. Wijnants played in the group stages and in the play-off semi-final against Greece but missed the victory over Ukraine in the play-off final on 3 December 2024.

On 11 June 2025, Wijnants was called up to the Belgium squad for the UEFA Women's Euro 2025.

== Career statistics ==
=== Club ===
As of match played 3 May 2017

Champions League
Year	Apps	Goals
2015	1	0
2016	3	1
Total	4	1

=== International ===
As of match played 6 October 2022

Appearances and goals by national team and year
National team	Year	Apps	Goals
Belgium	2017	4	0
Belgium	2018	4	0
Belgium	2019	1	0
Belgium	2020	2	0
Belgium	2021	7	1
Belgium	2022	8	1
Total		26	2

Scores and results list Belgium's goal tally first, score column indicates score after each Wijnants goal.

List of international goals scored by Sarah Wijnants
No.	Date	Venue	Opponent	Score	Result	Competition
1	25 November 2021	Den Dreef, Leuven, Belgium	Armenia	3–0	19–0	2023 FIFA Women's World Cup qualifying
2	16 February 2022	Pinatar Arena, San Pedro del Pinatar, Spain	Slovakia	4–0	4–0	Friendly
3	7 April 2022	Stadion Wiener Neustadt, Wiener Neustadt, Austria	Austria	1–0	2–3	Friendly

== Honours ==
Standard Liege

- Belgian Women's Super League: 2015–16, 2016–17

Anderlecht

- Belgian Women's Super League: 2017–18, 2018–19, 2019–20, 2020–21, 2021–22, 2022–23, 2023–24
- Belgian Women's Cup: 2022

Belgium

- Pinatar Cup: 2022
