= Silke Vanwynsberghe =

Belgian footballer

Personal information
- Date of birth: 25 April 1997 (age 29)
- Place of birth: Belgium
- Position: Defender

Team information
- Current team: Anderlecht
- Number: 21

Senior career*
| Years | Team | Apps | (Gls) |
| 2013–2016 | Lierse SK | - | (-) |
| 2016–2022 | Gent | 130 | (5) |
| 2022–2025 | Anderlecht | 70 | (5) |

International career^{‡}
| 2018–2022 | Belgium | 7 | (0) |
- * Club domestic league appearances and goals as of 19 November 2024 ‡ National team caps and goals as of 12 June 2022

Silke Vanwynsberghe (born 25 April 1997) is a Belgian former footballer who played as a central defender.

== Club career ==
Vanwynsberghe started her playing career with Lierse SK in 2013.

Moving to Gent in 2016, she ended her first season with them by playing in the Buffalos' first ever Cup success, a 3–1 victory over Anderlecht to win the 2017 Belgian Women's Cup Final.

After being beaten 3–2 by Racing Genk in the following year's Cup semi-final, Gent returned to the Cup Final in 2019, defeating Standard Fémina de Liège 2–0 with Mariam Toloba and Marie Minnaert scoring the goals.

Moving to defending champions Anderlecht in 2022, Vanwynsberghe claimed back-to-back titles in 2023 and 2024.

In April 2025, Vanwynsberghe announced that she would be retiring from football at the end of the 2024–25 season.

== International career ==
Vanwynsberghe made her debut for the Belgium national team on 2 March 2018, against Spain.

At the start of 2022, Vanwynsberghe scored the winning penalty to win Belgium the Pinatar Cup in Spain for the first time, beating Russia 7–6 on penalties in the final after a 0–0 draw.

== Honours ==
Gent

- Belgian Women's Cup: 2017, 2019

Anderlecht

- Belgian Women's Super League: 2022–23, 2023–24

Belgium

- Pinatar Cup: 2022
