= Janice Cayman =

Belgian footballer (born 1988)

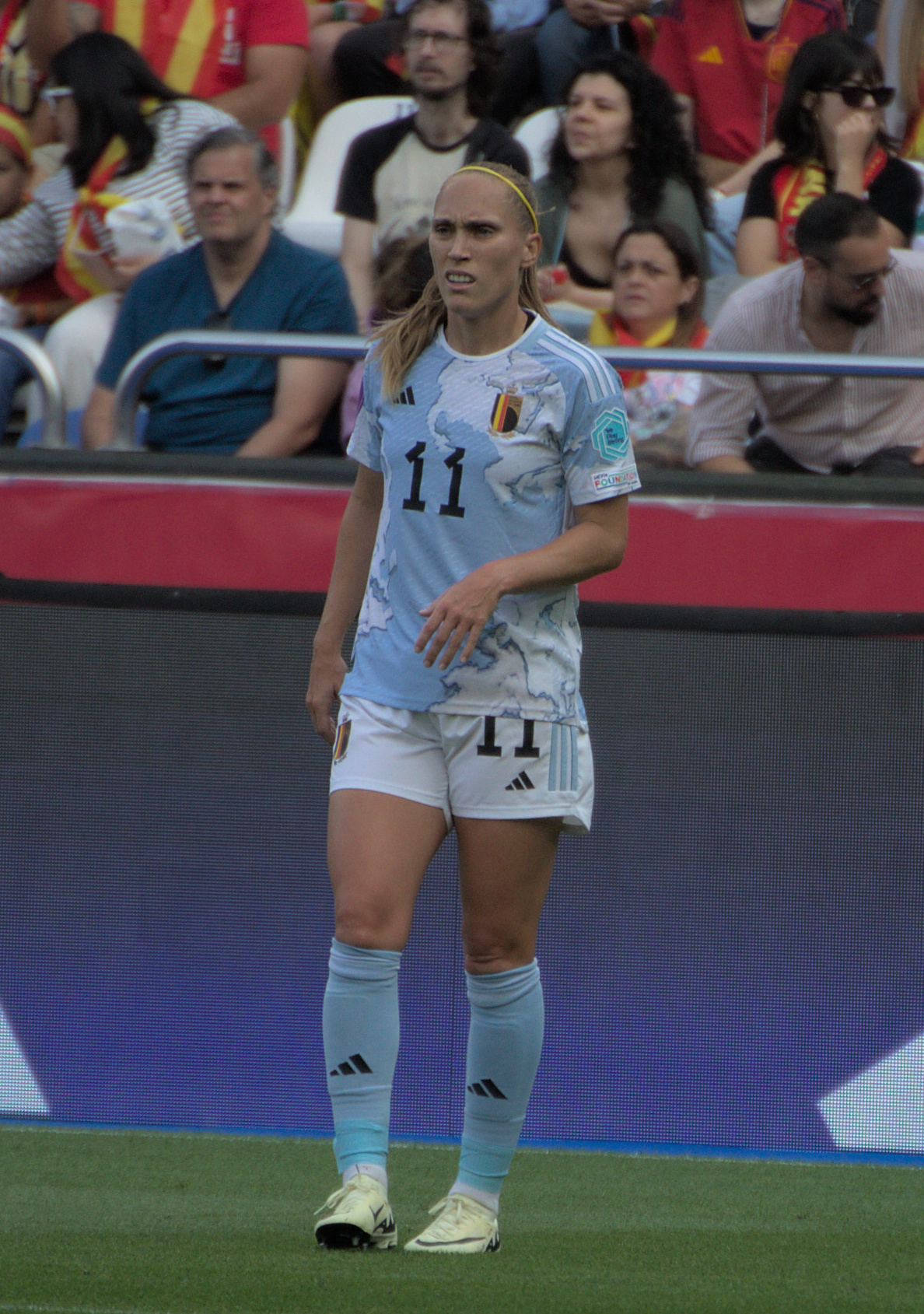
- Cayman in 2025

Personal information
- Date of birth: 12 October 1988 (age 38)
- Place of birth: Brasschaat, Belgium
- Height: 1.67 m (5 ft 6 in)
- Positions: Midfielder; striker; full-back

Team information
- Current team: PSV

College career
Years	Team	Apps	(Gls)
2010–2011	Florida State Seminoles	48	(16)

Senior career*
Years	Team	Apps	(Gls)
2005–2006	FC Excelsior Kaart		
2006–2007	KFC Lentezon Beerse		
2007–2008	Oud-Heverlee Leuven	10	(0)
2008–2009	KVK Tienen		
2009	Pali Blues		
2012–2016	FCF Juvisy	90	(13)
2016	Western New York Flash	3	(0)
2017–2019	Montpellier	52	(18)
2019–2023	Olympique Lyonnais	49	(6)
2023–2026	Leicester City	34	(5)
2026–	PSV	0	(0)

International career^{‡}
2003–2005	Belgium U17	3	(1)
2005–2007	Belgium U19	16	(3)
2007–	Belgium	178	(49)
- * Club domestic league appearances and goals as of 12:00, 9 February 2025 (UTC) ‡ National team caps and goals as of 15 October 2026

Janice Cayman (Flemish: [ˈdʑɛnɪs ˈkɛimɑn]; born 12 October 1988) is a Belgian professional footballer who plays as an attacking midfielder for Eredivisie Vrouwen club PSV Eindhoven and the Belgium national team. She is the Belgium's most-capped female player of all time, and is second in the absolute list of Belgian senior appearances behind Jan Vertonghen.

== Early life ==
Cayman grew up a fan of Brazilian international Romário, citing him as the inspiration for why she wore the number 11 during her time at Leicester City.

== Club career ==
Cayman previously played for Montpellier HSC and FCF Juvisy in the French First Division, OH Leuven and DVC Eva's Tienen in the Belgian First Division and Florida State Seminoles in the NCAA, also playing the European Cup with Tienen. Cayman made three appearances for the NWSL's Western New York Flash in 2016, a season which culminated with the team's first ever NWSL Championship. This was also the first trophy of Cayman's professional career.

== Leicester City ==
On 11 July 2023, it was announced that Cayman was joining Leicester City following a successful four-year spell with Lyon where she won eight trophies, including two Champions League tournaments. She scored the winner in the 1–0 victory against Everton on 28 January 2024. Cayman extended her Leicester contract on 20 June 2024 through the end of the 2024/25 season. In the first home game of the 2025–26 season, Cayman assisted the winning goal to make it 1–0 against Liverpool while her team played with ten players due to a red card.

On 8 January 2026, Cayman was announced at PSV on a one and a half year contract, with the option of an additional year extension.

== International ==
She is a member of the Belgium national team, making her first appearance in 2007 at 18 years old in a match against Germany. A highlight of her international career is when she scored four goals during their appearance at the 2016 Algarve Cup, making her top scorer of that tournament. She helped Belgium qualify for their first major tournament, UEFA Euro 2017 as well as to quality for the next tournament in 2022.

On 12 November 2019, Cayman played her 100th match for Belgium against Lithuania. Nearly five years later on 12 July 2024 in a match against Denmark, Cayman became the first women's national team player to appear in 150 matches for Belgium. She is only the second Belgian player to receive 150 caps with Jan Vertonghen the first, who received 157 caps over his career.

At the start of 2022, Cayman helped Belgium win the Pinatar Cup in Spain for the first time, beating Russia on penalties in the final after a 0–0 draw, with Cayman scoring in the shoot-out.

She was named in the Belgium squad for UEFA Euro 2022 in England, in their second appearance at the continental finals. The Red Flames finished second in Group D behind group favourites France, against whom they conceded a narrow defeat (1–2), but ahead of Iceland with a 1–1 draw and Italy, who they edged out 1–0. Belgium lost 1–0 to Sweden in the quarter-finals.

Cayman went on to contribute to Belgium's successful qualification for UEFA Euro 2025 via the play-offs, starting both legs of the play-off final against Ukraine.

On 11 June 2025, Cayman was called up to the Belgium squad for the UEFA Euro 2025.

== Career statistics ==
As of match played 13 October 2026

Appearances and goals by national team and year
National team	Year	Apps	Goals
Belgium	2007	2	0
Belgium	2008	6	1
Belgium	2009	2	0
Belgium	2010	0	0
Belgium	2011	3	1
Belgium	2012	8	3
Belgium	2013	8	0
Belgium	2014	8	2
Belgium	2015	10	1
Belgium	2016	13	9
Belgium	2017	15	10
Belgium	2018	11	4
Belgium	2019	14	7
Belgium	2020	7	2
Belgium	2021	12	6
Belgium	2022	13	2
Belgium	2023	12	0
Belgium	2024	11	0
Belgium	2025	15	1
Belgium	2026	8	0
Total		178	49

Scores and results list Belgium's goal tally first, score column indicates score after each Cayman goal.

List of international goals scored by Janice Cayman
No.	Date	Venue	Opponent	Score	Result	Competition
1	27 April 2008	Stade des Géants, Ath, Belgium	Switzerland	3–1	3–1	UEFA Women's Euro 2009 qualifying
2	24 May 2011	Excelsior Veldwezelt, Veldwezelt, Belgium	North Korea	1–0	1–0	Friendly
3	9 June 2012	Henri Houtsaeger Stadion, Koksijde, Belgium	North Korea	1–1	2–2	Friendly
4	20 June 2012	Rohonci Street Stadium, Szombathely, Hungary	Hungary	2–1	3–1	UEFA Women's Euro 2013 qualifying
5	19 September 2012	Windsor Park, Belfast, Northern Ireland	Northern Ireland	1–0	2–0	UEFA Women's Euro 2013 qualifying
6	13 September 2014	Den Dreef, Leuven, Belgium	Greece	7–0	11–0	2015 FIFA Women's World Cup qualifying
7	22 November 2014	Sosnowiec, Poland	Poland	1–1	4–1	Friendly
8	22 September 2015	Den Dreef, Leuven, Belgium	Bosnia and Herzegovina	4–0	6–0	UEFA Women's Euro 2017 qualifying
9	2 March 2016	Lagos, Portugal	Iceland	1–1	1–2	2016 Algarve Cup
10	7 March 2016	Albufeira, Portugal	Denmark	2–0	2–1	2016 Algarve Cup
11	9 March 2016	Vila Real de Santo António, Portugal	Russia	2–0	5–0	2016 Algarve Cup
12	9 March 2016	Vila Real de Santo António, Portugal	Russia	5–0	5–0	2016 Algarve Cup
13	8 April 2016	New York Stadium, Rotherham, England	England	1–0	1–1	UEFA Women's Euro 2017 qualifying
14	3 June 2016	Tamme Stadium, Tartu, Estonia	Estonia	4–0	5–0	UEFA Women's Euro 2017 qualifying
15	3 June 2016	Tamme Stadium, Tartu, Estonia	Estonia	5–0	5–0	UEFA Women's Euro 2017 qualifying
16	23 October 2016	Tubize, Belgium	Russia	3–0	3–1	Friendly
17	24 November 2016	Den Dreef, Leuven, Belgium	Netherlands	2–2	3–2	Friendly
18	1 March 2017	Nicosia, Cyprus	Switzerland	2–1	2–2	2017 Cyprus Women's Cup
19	8 April 2017	Kehrwegstadion, Eupen, Belgium	Spain	1–2	1–4	Friendly
20	11 July 2017	Van Roystadion, Denderleeuw, Belgium	Russia	2–0	2–0	Friendly
21	20 July 2017	Rat Verlegh Stadion, Breda, Netherlands	Norway	2–0	2–0	UEFA Women's Euro 2017
22	19 September 2017	Den Dreef, Leuven, Belgium	Moldova	1–0	12–0	2019 FIFA Women's World Cup qualifying
23	19 September 2017	Den Dreef, Leuven, Belgium	Moldova	6–0	12–0	2019 FIFA Women's World Cup qualifying
24	19 September 2017	Den Dreef, Leuven, Belgium	Moldova	7–0	12–0	2019 FIFA Women's World Cup qualifying
25	19 September 2017	Den Dreef, Leuven, Belgium	Moldova	11–0	12–0	2019 FIFA Women's World Cup qualifying
26	20 October 2017	Den Dreef, Leuven, Belgium	Romania	1–0	3–2	2019 FIFA Women's World Cup qualifying
27	20 October 2017	Den Dreef, Leuven, Belgium	Romania	2–0	3–2	2019 FIFA Women's World Cup qualifying
28	10 April 2018	Stadio Paolo Mazza, Ferrara, Italy	Italy	1–0	1–2	2019 FIFA Women's World Cup qualifying
29	10 June 2018	Zimbru Stadium, Chișinău, Moldova	Moldova	1–0	7–0	2019 FIFA Women's World Cup qualifying
30	10 June 2018	Zimbru Stadium, Chișinău, Moldova	Moldova	7–0	7–0	2019 FIFA Women's World Cup qualifying
31	5 October 2018	Den Dreef, Leuven, Belgium	Switzerland	1–0	2–2	2019 FIFA Women's World Cup qualifying
32	17 January 2019	Estadio Cartagonova, Cartagena, Spain	Spain	1–1	1–1	Friendly
33	27 February 2019	AEK Arena, Larnaca, Cyprus	Slovakia	1–0	3–0	2019 Cyprus Women's Cup
34	27 February 2019	AEK Arena, Larnaca, Cyprus	Slovakia	2–0	3–0	2019 Cyprus Women's Cup
35	1 June 2019	Oud-Heverlee Stadion, Leuven, Belgium	Thailand	5–0	6–1	Friendly
36	3 September 2019	Den Dreef, Leuven, Belgium	Croatia	1–0	6–1	UEFA Women's Euro 2022 qualifying
37	3 September 2019	Den Dreef, Leuven, Belgium	Croatia	3–0	6–1	UEFA Women's Euro 2022 qualifying
38	3 September 2019	Den Dreef, Leuven, Belgium	Croatia	4–0	6–1	UEFA Women's Euro 2022 qualifying
39	18 September 2020	Stadionul Mogoșoaia, Mogoșoaia, Romania	Romania	2–0	6–1	UEFA Women's Euro 2022 qualifying
40	1 December 2020	Den Dreef, Leuven, Belgium	Switzerland	4–0	4–0	UEFA Women's Euro 2022 qualifying
41	17 September 2021	Gdańsk Stadium, Gdańsk, Poland	Poland	1–1	1–1	2023 FIFA Women's World Cup qualifying
42	21 September 2021	King Baudouin Stadium, Brussels, Belgium	Albania	1–0	7–0	2023 FIFA Women's World Cup qualifying
43	21 October 2021	Den Dreef, Leuven, Belgium	Kosovo	2–0	7–0	2023 FIFA Women's World Cup qualifying
44	25 November 2021	Den Dreef, Leuven, Belgium	Armenia	15–0	19–0	2023 FIFA Women's World Cup qualifying
45	25 November 2021	Den Dreef, Leuven, Belgium	Armenia	17–0	19–0	2023 FIFA Women's World Cup qualifying
46	30 November 2021	Den Dreef, Leuven, Belgium	Poland	3–0	4–0	2023 FIFA Women's World Cup qualifying
47	16 February 2022	Pinatar Arena, San Pedro del Pinatar, Spain	Slovakia	2–0	4–0	2022 Pinatar Cup
48	14 July 2022	New York Stadium, Rotherham, England	France	1–1	1–2	UEFA Women's Euro 2022
49	11 July 2025	Stade de Tourbillon, Sion, Switzerland	Portugal	2–1	2–1	UEFA Women's Euro 2025

== Honours ==
Pali Blues

- USL W-League: 2009

Western New York Flash

- NWSL Championship: 2016

Olympique Lyonnais

- UEFA Women's Champions League: 2019–20, 2021–22
- Division 1 Féminine: 2021–22, 2022–23
- Coupe de France féminine: 2019–20, 2022–23
- Trophée des Championnes: 2019, 2022

Belgium

- Pinatar Cup: 2022

== See also ==
- List of women's footballers with 100 or more international caps
