= Femke Bastiaen =

Belgian footballer

Personal information
- Full name: Femke Sabrina Bastiaen
- Date of birth: 11 January 2001 (age 25)
- Place of birth: Zulte, Belgium
- Position: Goalkeeper

Team information
- Current team: Utrecht
- Number: 1

Youth career
- –2017: Jong Zulte
- 2017–2020: Gent

Senior career*
Years	Team	Apps	(Gls)
- Zulte Waregem
2017–2020	Gent		
2020–2021	Kontich FC		
2021–2024	PSV	3	(0)
2024–	Utrecht	17	(0)

International career^{‡}
2016	Belgium U15	1	(0)
2017	Belgium U16	5	(0)
2017–2018	Belgium U17	7	(0)
2018–2019	Belgium U19	14	(0)
2021–2024	Belgium U23	17	(0)
2022–	Belgium	0	(0)
- * Club domestic league appearances and goals as of 16 March 2025 ‡ National team caps and goals as of 19 November 2024

Femke Sabrina Bastiaen (born 11 April 2001) is a Belgian footballer who plays as a goalkeeper for FC Utrecht and the Belgium national team. She has previously played for PSV and Kontich FC.

== Club career ==
Born in Zulte, Bastiaen started her career in the youths at her local club Jong Zulte, before progressing to the adult club Zulte Waregem. Bastiaen also played in her native country for KAA Gent and during covid lockdown, joined amateur club Kontich FC.

Bastiaen moved to PSV in the 2021–22 season, joining their youth academy. On 20 January 2022, Bastiaen signed her first contract with PSV, keeping her at the club until mid-2024. She was also transferred to the first team of the Eindhoven club.

Bastiaen made her debut for PSV in the Women's Eredivisie in a 4–0 home win against VV Alkmaar on 29 April 2023. Bastiaen was given a start in the first team in the absence of Lisan Alkemade. Bastiaen also started the following match, away to SC Heerenveen.

Prior to the 2024–25 season, Bastiaen transferred to fellow competitor FC Utrecht, signing a contract until mid-2026, becoming the first foreign player to sign with the club.

== International career ==
Bastiaen played 44 times at every underage level for Belgium. She debuted for Belgium under 19s in 2018, and moved up to under 23 level in 2022, playing 17 times at the Olympic age group.

Bastiaen's first senior call-up was for Belgium's 6–1 win over Luxembourg in Luxembourg in June 2022, but she did not come on. She was included in Belgium's preliminary selection for the 2022 European Championship in England but was left out of the final selection.

She went on to be a substitute goalkeeper in contributing to Belgium's successful qualification for UEFA Women's Euro 2025 via the play-offs, ultimately winning the play-off final against Ukraine.

On 11 June 2025, Bastiaen was called up to the Belgium squad for the UEFA Women's Euro 2025.

== Honours ==
PSV

- KNVB Women's Cup runner-up: 2022, 2023
- Eredivisie Cup runner-up: 2023–24

Belgium

- Pinatar Cup: 2022
- Arnold Clark Cup runner-up: 2023
