= Tine De Caigny =

Belgian footballer (born 1997)

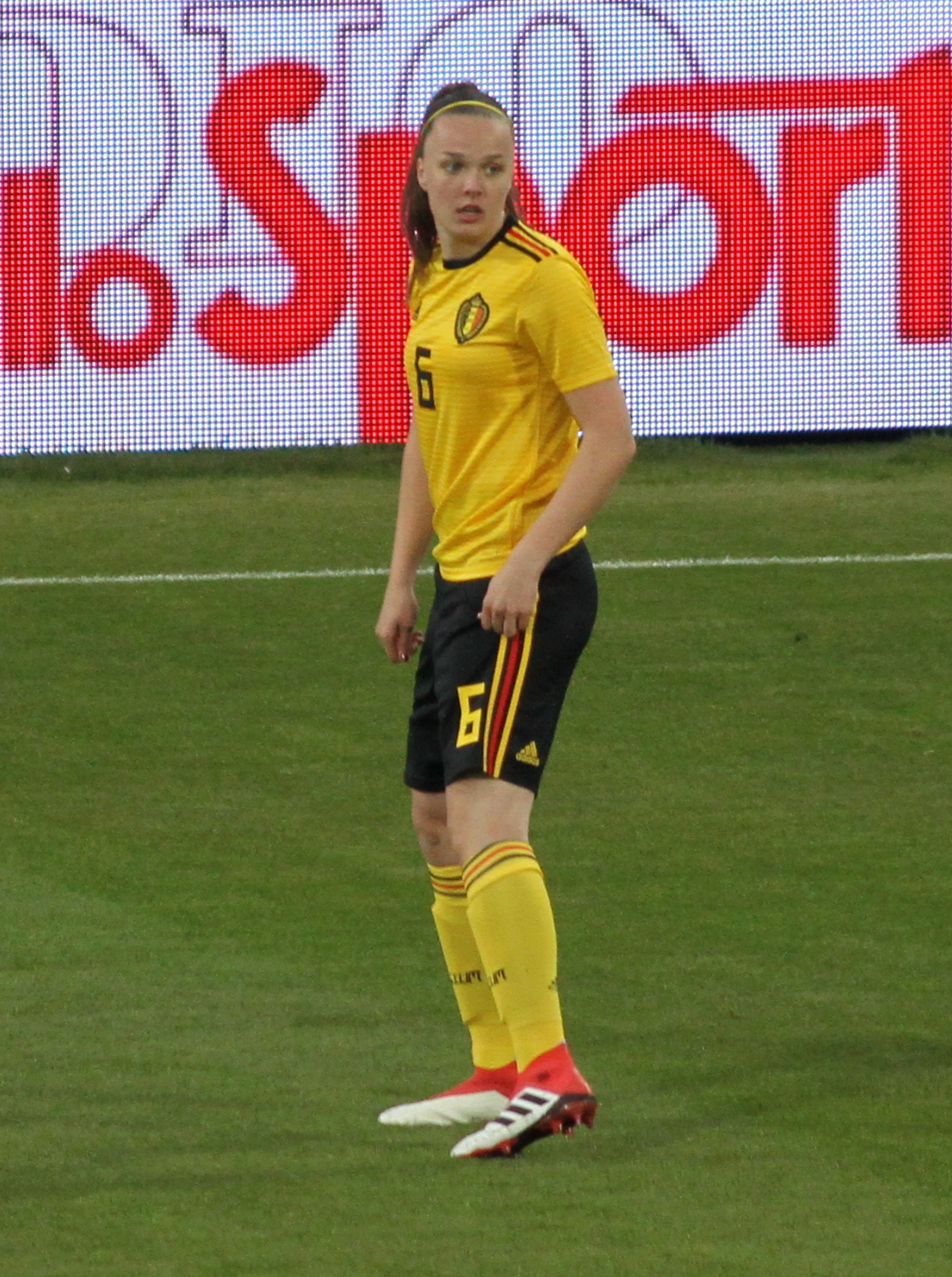
- De Caigny in 2018

Personal information
- Date of birth: 9 June 1997 (age 29)
- Place of birth: Beveren, Belgium
- Height: 1.80 m (5 ft 11 in)
- Position: Midfielder

Team information
- Current team: Anderlecht
- Number: 6

Senior career*
Years	Team	Apps	(Gls)
2013–2015	Club Brugge	41	(1)
2015–2016	Lierse		
2016	Vålerenga	6	(1)
2017–2021	Anderlecht	46	(34)
2021–2023	TSG Hoffenheim	36	(6)
2023–	Anderlecht	0	(0)

International career^{‡}
2011–2012	Belgium U15	4	(2)
2012–2013	Belgium U17	12	(4)
2013–2015	Belgium U19	14	(1)
2014–	Belgium	106	(42)
- * Club domestic league appearances and goals as of 21 November 2022 ‡ National team caps and goals as of 30 May 2025

Tine De Caigny (born 9 June 1997) is a Belgian footballer who plays as a midfielder for Anderlecht after previously featuring for Frauen-Bundesliga club TSG Hoffenheim. She is one of a select number of players with over 100 caps for the Belgium national team.

== Club career ==
From Beveren, De Caigny spent the early years of her career with Club Brugge where she played in two Belgian Cup Finals, losing both. She moved in 2015 to Lierse for a season and spending a year in Norway the following year with Vålerenga.

De Caigny joined Anderlecht in 2017, enjoying league glory in each of her four seasons with the Brussels club, winning four league titles in a row, before moving in the summer of 2021 to Frauen-Bundesliga club 1899 Hoffenheim, where she played in the 2021-22 UEFA Women's Champions League.

Returning to Anderlecht in 2023, she helped the Mauves win the 2023-24 Belgian title via the title play-offs, overhauling regular season winners Oud-Heverlee Leuven.

She won the Belgian Golden Shoe for Player of the Year in 2020.

== International career ==
On 12 November 2019, De Caigny became the first Belgian player to score five goals in a senior international game, 6–0 against Lithuania.

At the start of 2022, De Caigny helped Belgium win the Pinatar Cup in Spain for the first time, beating Russia on penalties in the final after a 0–0 draw. De Caigny scored in the shoot-out.

On 18 July 2022, she scored the only goal in a 1–0 win over Italy, earning Belgium a spot in the quarter-finals of the Euro 2022 for the first time in the history of the competition.

On 12 July 2024, De Caigny recorded her 100th cap for Belgium in a 3–0 defeat against Denmark.

She went on to contribute to Belgium's successful qualification for UEFA Women's Euro 2025 via the play-offs, coming on as substitute in both legs of the play-off final against Ukraine. She had missed parts of the campaign through injury.

On 11 June 2025, De Caigny was called up to the Belgium squad for the UEFA Women's Euro 2025.

== Career statistics ==
Scores and results list Belgium's goal tally first, score column indicates score after each De Caigny goal.

List of international goals scored by Tine De Caigny
No.	Date	Venue	Opponent	Score	Result	Competition
1	13 September 2014	Den Dreef, Leuven, Belgium	Greece	1–0	11–0	2015 FIFA Women's World Cup qualification
2	13 September 2014	Den Dreef, Leuven, Belgium	Greece	9–0	11–0	2015 FIFA Women's World Cup qualification
3	22 November 2014	Stadion Ludowy, Sosnowiec, Poland	Poland	4–1	4–1	Friendly
4	16 September 2015	Tubize, Belgium	Poland	3–0	5–0	Friendly
5	12 April 2016	Den Dreef, Leuven, Belgium	Estonia	2–0	6–0	UEFA Women's Euro 2017 qualifying
6	12 April 2016	Den Dreef, Leuven, Belgium	Estonia	4–0	6–0	UEFA Women's Euro 2017 qualifying
7	15 September 2016	Sports Center of FA of Serbia, Stara Pazova, Serbia	Serbia	1–0	3–1	UEFA Women's Euro 2017 qualifying
8	19 September 2017	Den Dreef, Leuven, Belgium	Moldova	10–0	12–0	2019 FIFA Women's World Cup qualification
9	24 Oktober 2017	Estádio Municipal 25 de Abril, Penafiel, Portugal	Portugal	1–0	1–0	2019 FIFA Women's World Cup qualification
10	28 February 2018	GSZ Stadium, Larnaca, Cyprus	Czech Republic	1–2	1–2	2018 Cyprus Women's Cup
11	6 April 2018	Den Dreef, Leuven, Belgium	Portugal	1–0	1–1	2019 FIFA Women's World Cup qualification
12	9 Oktober 2018	Tissot Arena, Biel/Bienne, Switzerland	Switzerland	1–1	1–1	2019 FIFA Women's World Cup qualification
13	3 September 2019	Den Dreef, Leuven, Belgium	Croatia	2–0	6–1	UEFA Women's Euro 2022 qualifying
14	8 November 2019	Ivan Laljak-Ivić Stadium, Zaprešić, Croatia	Croatia	4–1	4–1	UEFA Women's Euro 2022 qualifying
15	12 November 2019	Den Dreef, Leuven, Belgium	Lithuania	1–0	6–0	UEFA Women's Euro 2022 qualifying
16	12 November 2019	Den Dreef, Leuven, Belgium	Lithuania	3–0	6–0	UEFA Women's Euro 2022 qualifying
17	12 November 2019	Den Dreef, Leuven, Belgium	Lithuania	4–0	6–0	UEFA Women's Euro 2022 qualifying
18	12 November 2019	Den Dreef, Leuven, Belgium	Lithuania	5–0	6–0	UEFA Women's Euro 2022 qualifying
19	12 November 2019	Den Dreef, Leuven, Belgium	Lithuania	6–0	6–0	UEFA Women's Euro 2022 qualifying
20	7 March 2020	Vista Municipal Stadium, Parchal, Portugal	Portugal	1–0	1–0	2020 Algarve Cup
21	27 October 2020	Sūduva Stadium, Marijampolė, Lithuania	Lithuania	4–0	9–0	UEFA Women's Euro 2022 qualifying
22	27 October 2020	Sūduva Stadium, Marijampolė, Lithuania	Lithuania	5–0	9–0	UEFA Women's Euro 2022 qualifying
23	27 October 2020	Sūduva Stadium, Marijampolė, Lithuania	Lithuania	6–0	9–0	UEFA Women's Euro 2022 qualifying
24	1 December 2020	Den Dreef, Leuven, Belgium	Switzerland	1–0	4–0	UEFA Women's Euro 2022 qualifying
25	1 December 2020	Den Dreef, Leuven, Belgium	Switzerland	2–0	4–0	UEFA Women's Euro 2022 qualifying
26	11 April 2021	King Baudouin Stadium, Brussels, Belgium	Republic of Ireland	1–0	1–0	Friendly
27	21 September 2021	King Baudouin Stadium, Brussels, Belgium	Albania	2–0	7–0	2023 FIFA Women's World Cup qualifier
28	21 September 2021	King Baudouin Stadium, Brussels, Belgium	Albania	3–0	7–0	2023 FIFA Women's World Cup qualifier
29	21 Oktober 2021	Den Dreef, Leuven, Belgium	Kosovo	4–0	7–0	2023 FIFA Women's World Cup qualifier
30	25 November 2021	Den Dreef, Leuven, Belgium	Armenia	5–0	19–0	2023 FIFA Women's World Cup qualifier
31	25 November 2021	Den Dreef, Leuven, Belgium	Armenia	7–0	19–0	2023 FIFA Women's World Cup qualifier
32	25 November 2021	Den Dreef, Leuven, Belgium	Armenia	9–0	19–0	2023 FIFA Women's World Cup qualifier
33	30 November 2021	Den Dreef, Leuven, Belgium	Poland	1–0	4–0	2023 FIFA Women's World Cup qualifier
34	16 February	Pinatar Arena, San Pedro del Pinatar, Spain	Slovakia	3–0	4–0	Friendly
35	7 April 2022	Elbasan Arena, Elbasan, Albania	Albania	1–0	5–0	2023 FIFA Women's World Cup qualifier
36	7 April 2022	Elbasan Arena, Elbasan, Albania	Albania	3–0	5–0	2023 FIFA Women's World Cup qualifier
37	12 April 2022	Fadil Vokrri Stadium, Pristina, Kosovo	Kosovo	1–0	6–1	2023 FIFA Women's World Cup qualifier
38	18 July 2022	Academy Stadium, Manchester, England	Italy	1–0	1–0	UEFA Women's Euro 2022
39	12 November 2022	Joseph Marien Stadium, Brussels, Belgium	Slovakia	4–0	7–0	Friendly
40	19 February 2023	Coventry Building Society Arena, Coventry, England	South Korea	2–1	2–1	Friendly
41	31 May 2024	Fortuna Arena, Prague, Czech Republic	Czech Republic	2–0	2–1	UEFA Women's Euro 2025 qualifying
42	30 May 2025	Den Dreef, Leuven, Belgium	Spain	1–5	1–5	2025 UEFA Women's Nations League

== Honours ==
Anderlecht

- Super League: 2017–18, 2018–19, 2019–20, 2020–21, 2023–24; runner-up 2016–17

Lierse

- Belgian Women's Cup: 2015–16

Club Brugge

- Belgian Women's Cup runner-up: 2013–14, 2014–15

Belgium

- Pinatar Cup: 2022

=== Individual ===
- Belgian Golden Shoe (Player of the Year): 2020

== See also ==
- List of women's footballers with 100 or more international caps
