= 2022 Pinatar Cup =

Tournament details
- Host country: Spain
- Dates: 16–22 February
- Teams: 8 (from 1 confederation)
- Venue: 2 (in 2 host cities)

Final positions
- Champions: Belgium (1st title)
- Runners-up: Russia
- Third place: Republic of Ireland
- Fourth place: Wales

Tournament statistics
- Matches played: 12
- Goals scored: 24 (2 per match)
- Top scorer(s): (Hungary) Dóra Zeller (Russia) Elizaveta Lazareva (Wales) Jess Fishlock (2 goals)

The 2022 Pinatar Cup was the second edition of the Pinatar Cup, an international women's football friendly tournament, that was held from 16 to 22 February 2022 in San Pedro del Pinatar, Region of Murcia, Spain.

== Format ==
The eight invited teams played in a knockout stage, starting with the quarter-finals. From there on, the teams were split into a winning and lower bracket.

== Teams ==
Eight teams participated.

Team	FIFA Rankings (December 2021)
Belgium	20
Scotland	23
Russia	25
Poland	30
Republic of Ireland	31
Wales	33
Hungary	43
Slovakia	44

== Results ==
All times are local (UTC+1).

=== Bracket ===
Fifth place
Scotland (p)	0 (3)
Hungary	0 (1)
Seventh place
Slovakia	2
Poland	0

Consolation semifinals
Scotland	2
Slovakia	0
Poland	1
Hungary	2

Quarterfinals
Wales	3
Scotland	1
Slovakia	0
Belgium	4
Republic of Ireland	2
Poland	1
Russia (p)	2 (3)
Hungary	2 (0)

Semifinals
Wales	0 (1)
Belgium(p)	0 (3)
Republic of Ireland	0
Russia	1

Final
Belgium (p)	0 (7)
Russia	0 (6)
Third place
Wales	0
Republic of Ireland	1

=== Quarter-finals ===
16 February 2022
15:30

Wales	3–1	Scotland
Fishlock 45+6', 53'; Harding 61'	Report	Clelland 45+4'

Pinatar Arena, San Pedro del Pinatar

16 February 2022
15:30

Republic of Ireland	2–1	Poland
Lu. Quinn 52'; Lo. Quinn 75'	Report	Dudek 49'

La Manga Club Football Stadium, La Manga
Referee: Valentová Zuzana (Slovakia)

16 February 2022
20:30

Slovakia	0–4	Belgium
	Report	Eurlings 33'; Cayman 71'; De Caigny 89'; Wijnants 90'

Pinatar Arena, San Pedro del Pinatar

16 February 2022
20:30

Hungary	2–2	Russia
Zeller 54', 71'	Report	Korovkina 51'; Lazareva 62'
Penalties
Csiszár (penalty missed); Zágor (penalty missed); Kocsán (penalty missed)	0–3	(penalty scored) Kasina; (penalty scored) Morina; (penalty scored) Fedorova

La Manga Club Football Stadium, La Manga

=== 5–8th place semi-finals ===
19 February 2022
15:30

Scotland	2–0	Slovakia
Harrison 4'; Thomas 24'	Report

Pinatar Arena, San Pedro del Pinatar

19 February 2022
15:30

Poland	1–2	Hungary
Zawistowska 20'	Report	Csiszár 16'; Vágó 90+1'

La Manga Club Football Stadium, La Manga

=== Semi-finals ===
19 February 2022
20:30

Wales	0–0	Belgium
	Report
Penalties
Green (penalty scored); Estcourt (penalty missed); Woodham (penalty missed); James (penalty missed)	1–3	(penalty missed) Minnaert; (penalty scored) Blom; (penalty scored) Eurlings; (penalty scored) Cayman

Pinatar Arena, San Pedro del Pinatar

19 February 2022
20:30

Republic of Ireland	0–1	Russia
	Report	Lazareva 7'

La Manga Club Football Stadium, La Manga

=== Seventh place game ===
22 February 2022
15:30

Slovakia	2–0	Poland
Mikolajová 55'; Semanová 83'	Report

La Manga Club Football Stadium, La Manga
Referee: Lucie Šulcová (Czech Republic)

=== Fifth place game ===
22 February 2022
20:30

Scotland	0–0	Hungary
	Report
Penalties
Emslie (penalty scored); Kerr (penalty scored); Clelland (penalty scored)	3–1	(penalty scored) Vágó; (penalty missed) Zeller; (penalty missed) Németh; (penalty missed) Savanya

Pinatar Arena, San Pedro del Pinatar

=== Third place game ===
22 February 2022
15:30

Wales	0–1	Republic of Ireland
	Report	O'Sullivan 25'

La Manga Club Football Stadium, La Manga

=== Final ===
22 February 2022
20:30

Belgium	0–0	Russia
	Report
Penalties
Philtjens (penalty missed); Wijnants (penalty scored); De Caigny (penalty scored); Cayman (penalty scored); Evrard (penalty scored); Biesmans (penalty scored); Minnaert (penalty scored); Vanwynsberghe (penalty scored)	7–6	(penalty scored) Belomyttseva; (penalty scored) Mashkova; (penalty scored) Fedorova; (penalty scored) Samoylova; (penalty missed) Sheina; (penalty scored) Abdullina; (penalty scored) Petrova; (penalty missed) Simanovskaya

Pinatar Arena, San Pedro del Pinatar

== Final ranking ==
Rank	Team
1st place, gold medalist(s)	Belgium
2nd place, silver medalist(s)	Russia
3rd place, bronze medalist(s)	Republic of Ireland
4	Wales
5	Scotland
6	Hungary
7	Slovakia
8	Poland

== Goalscorers ==
There were 24 goals scored in 12 matches, for an average of 2 goals per match.

2 goals

- (Hungary) Dóra Zeller
- (Russia) Elizaveta Lazareva
- (Wales) Jess Fishlock

1 goal

- (Belgium) Tine De Caigny
- (Belgium) Janice Cayman
- (Belgium) Hannah Eurlings
- (Belgium) Sarah Wijnants
- (Hungary) Henrietta Csiszár
- (Hungary) Fanny Vágó
- (Republic of Ireland) Denise O'Sullivan
- (Republic of Ireland) Louise Quinn
- (Republic of Ireland) Lucy Quinn
- (Poland) Paulina Dudek
- (Poland) Weronika Zawistowska
- (Russia) Nelli Korovkina
- (Scotland) Lana Clelland
- (Scotland) Abi Harrison
- (Scotland) Martha Thomas
- (Slovakia) Mária Mikolajová
- (Slovakia) Stela Semanová
- (Wales) Natasha Harding
