= Chloë Vande Velde =

Belgian footballer

Chloé Vande Velde
Personal information
- Full name: Chloé Nicole Vande Velde
- Date of birth: 6 June 1997 (age 29)
- Place of birth: Belgium
- Height: 1.69 m (5 ft 7 in)
- Position: Forward

Team information
- Current team: Club YLA
- Number: 8

Senior career*
Years	Team	Apps	(Gls)
2014–2021	Gent	40	(2)
2021	Breiðablik	9	(1)
2022–2024	ADO Den Haag	22	(1)
2024–	Club YLA		

International career
2013	Belgium U17	5	(1)
2017–2023	Belgium	28	(2)
- * Club domestic league appearances and goals as of 14 January 2024

Chloé Vande Velde (born 6 June 1997) is a Belgian footballer who plays as a forward for Club YLA and has appeared for the Belgium women's national team.

== Career ==
Vande Velde has been capped for the Belgium national team, appearing for the team during the 2019 FIFA Women's World Cup qualifying cycle.

Vande Velde won the Belgian Women's Cup with Gent in 2017 and 2019 alongside future Belgian Red Flames team-mate Jody Vangheluwe, departing for Breiðablik in 2021, before moving to the Women's Eredivisie with ADO Den Haag the following year.

== International goals ==
Scores and results list the Belgian goal tally first.

Goal	Date	Venue	Opponent	Score	Result	Competition
1.	10 June 2018	Chișinău, Moldova	Moldova	2–0	7–0	2019 FIFA Women's World Cup qualification
2.	4 March 2020	Vista Municipal Stadium, Parchal, Portugal	New Zealand	1–1	1–1	2020 Algarve Cup
