= Mariam Toloba =

Belgian footballer (born 1999)

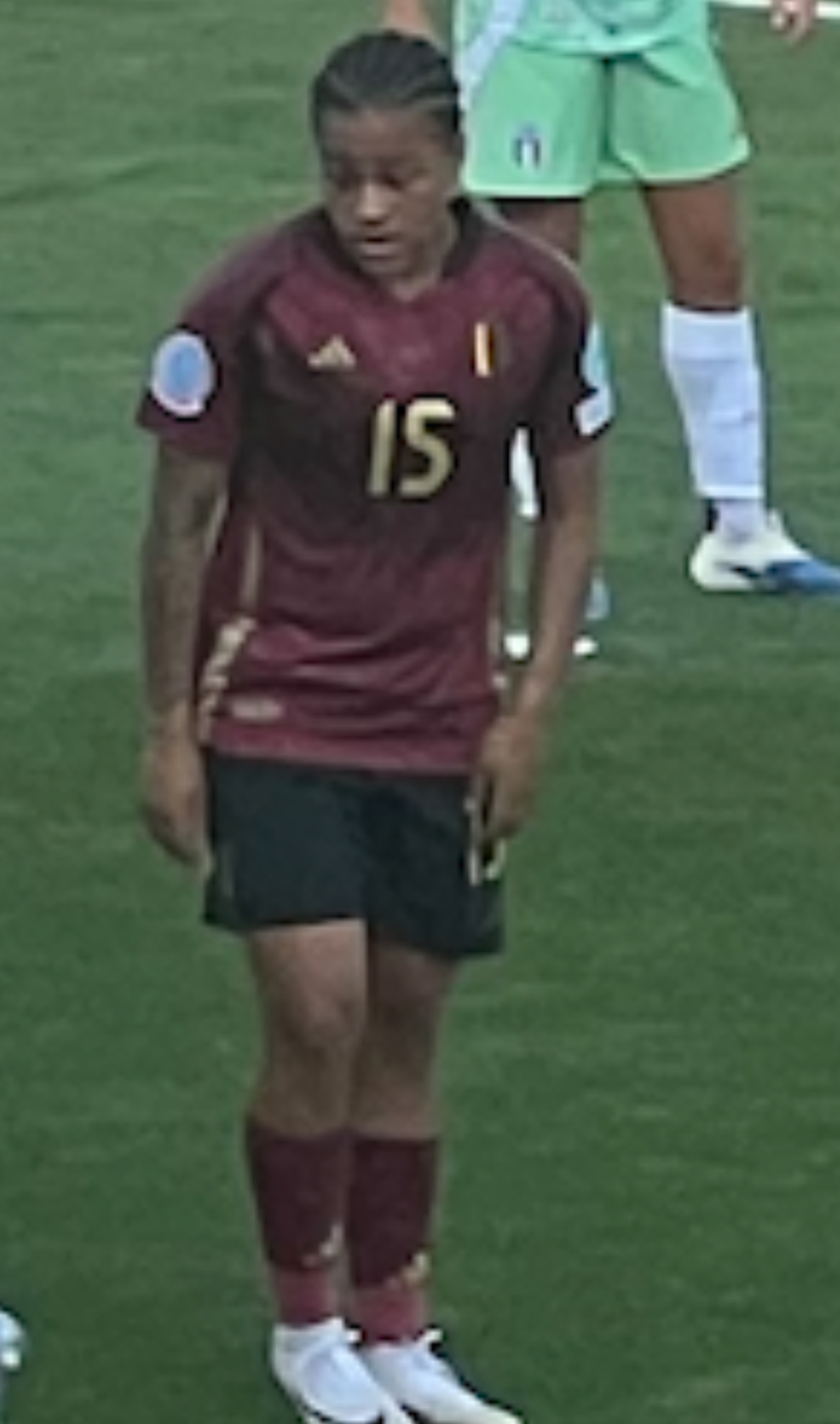
- Toloba playing for Belgium in 2025

Personal information
- Full name: Mariam Abdulai Toloba
- Date of birth: 20 September 1999 (age 27)
- Place of birth: Ghent, Belgium
- Position: Striker

Team information
- Current team: Paris FC
- Number: 7

Youth career
- -2012: Sparta Petegem
- 2012-2015: Gent

Senior career*
| Years | Team | Apps | (Gls) |
| 2015–2019 | Gent | | |
| 2019–2023 | Anderlecht | 87 | (16) |
| 2023–2025 | Standard Liège | 34 | (14) |
| 2025–2026 | FC Nantes | 19 | (7) |
| 2026– | Paris FC | 4 | (3) |

International career^{‡}
| 2014 | Belgium U16 | 3 | (2) |
| 2014–2016 | Belgium U17 | 15 | (5) |
| 2016–2018 | Belgium U19 | 16 | (8) |
| 2024- | Belgium | 24 | (2) |
- * Club domestic league appearances and goals as of 21:23, 7 October 2026 (UTC) ‡ National team caps and goals as of 20:15, 15 October 2026 (UTC)

Mariam Abdulai Toloba (born 20 September 1999) is a Belgian professional footballer who plays as a striker for Première Ligue club Paris FC and the Belgium national team. Toloba is the 2025 Belgian Women's Footballer of the Year after scoring the winning goal for Standard in the Belgian Cup Final. She previously played for Gent and Anderlecht, and was a UEFA Goal of the Year nominee as a 15-year-old.

== Career ==
After starting in football in the school teams of Sparta Gent, Evergem and Sparta Petegem, Toloba moved to Gent as a 13-year-old, making her debut in the Belgian Women's Super League at the age of 15 with Gent in 2015, making headlines for being nominated that year for UEFA's Goal of the Year while playing for the Belgium under-17s.

Toloba ended her second season in top-class Belgian football by scoring in the Buffalos' first-ever Cup success, a 3–1 victory over Anderlecht to win the 2017 Belgian Women's Cup Final. Toloba scored the clinching goal near the end. After being beaten 3–2 by Genk in the following year's Cup semi-final, Gent returned to the Cup Final in 2019, defeating Standard Fémina de Liège 2–0 with Toloba and Marie Minnaert scoring the goals.

Toloba moved to Anderlecht in the summer of 2019, winning four league titles in a row. Her final success in 2022-23 was somewhat bittersweet as she was on the bench much more this season than being a starter.

After only starting 11 league games with Anderlecht that season, she moved to Standard Liege in May 2023, and started 24 games in their 2023-24 Belgian Women's Super League title assault, where Standard finished two points behind Anderlecht, drawing their two games against the Mauves in the title play-offs. Toloba scored the only goal in the 2025 Women's Cup Final victory over Anderlecht, rounding off the season by being named Women's Player of the Year at the Pro League Awards. At season's end, she announced her departure from Standard Liege and would be moving elsewhere for the 2025–26 season.

In the summer of 2025, Toloba signed for French Première Ligue club FC Nantes. She helped Nantes finish the season in fourth place and qualify for the league playoffs. In January 2026, she was named the Première Ligue Player of the Month.

On 17 June 2026, it was announced that Toloba had joined Paris FC on a transfer, signing a contract with the club until 2029.

== International career ==
Toloba played 33 underage internationals for Belgium, scoring twice on her international debut at under-16 level in a 4–0 win over Croatia in 2014.

She was involved in two unsuccessful European Under-17 qualifying campaigns, missing out on the Championships in 2015 and 2016, but still scored five times at that level, netting eight goals in 16 appearances from the under-19s.

Toloba made her debut for the Belgium senior national women's team, the Red Flames, on 12 July 2024, coming on as a substitute for Laura Deloose in a 3–0 home loss to Denmark in a UEFA Women's Euro 2025 qualifier at the Stayen in Sint-Truiden. Toloba was handed a second appearance for Belgium in their 5-0 Euro 2025 play-off semi-final win over Greece when coming on late as substitute for Hannah Eurlings at Den Dreef.

Toloba's first goal for Belgium came in the second leg of their Euro 2025 play-off final against Ukraine in a 2–1 win at Den Dreef on 3 December 2024.

On 11 June 2025, Toloba was called up to the Belgium squad for the UEFA Women's Euro 2025.

== UEFA Goal of the Season nominee ==
In July 2015, Toloba was named in UEFA's Goal of the Season list for the 2014–15 campaign for her Dennis Bergkamp-style goal in the 5–0 win over Wales in qualifying for the 2015 UEFA Women's European Under-17 Championship.

For this, she was nominated alongside Lionel Messi, Cristiano Ronaldo and Kevin De Bruyne, the only woman among the ten to be up for the award. In doing so, Toloba and De Bruyne became the first Belgians to be nominated for the award in its history.

Messi won the trophy for a Barcelona goal against Bayern Munich in the UEFA Champions League.

== Futsal ==
Toloba has also played futsal at club and international level, helping Besiktas Gent to victory in the Nantes Mondial tournament in 2024.

Toloba took on the role of assistant coach at Besiktas Gent in April 2020, alongside coach Andy Van de Geuchte.

She scored in all three group games for Belgium in the 2019 UEFA Women's Futsal Euro qualifiers held in Newry, netting against Northern Ireland in a 4–3 win, also scoring against Sweden and the Netherlands as Belgium missed out on qualification.

Toloba scored four goals in a 7–2 win over Northern Ireland in Roosdahl on 2 December 2023, and netted again in 5–1 victory over the same opposition the following day.

== Personal life ==
Toloba's mother is from Belgium and her father is from Ghana. She has three brothers who have also played football at a local level.

== Career statistics ==
=== International ===
As of match played 13 October 2026

Appearances and goals by national team and year
| National team | Year | Apps | Goals |
|---|---|---|---|
Belgium
| Belgium | 2024 | 4 | 1 |
| Belgium | 2024 | 13 | 1 |
| Belgium | 2026 | 7 | 0 |
| Total | | 24 | 2 |

Scores and results list Belgium's goal tally first, score column indicates score after each Toloba goal.

List of international goals scored by Mariam Toloba
| No. | Date | Venue | Opponent | Score | Result | Competition |
|---|---|---|---|---|---|---|
| 1 | 3 December 2024 | Den Dreef, Leuven, Belgium | Ukraine | 1–0 | 2–1 | UEFA Women's Euro 2025 qualifying play-offs |
| 2 | 21 February 2025 | Estadi Ciutat de València, Valencia, Spain | Spain | 1–0 | 2–3 | 2025 UEFA Women's Nations League |

== Honours ==
Gent

- Belgian Women's Cup: 2017, 2019

Anderlecht

- Belgian Women's Super League: 2019–20, 2020–21, 2021–22, 2022–23
- Belgian Women's Cup: 2022

Standard Liege

- Belgian Women's Cup: 2025

Individual

- Belgian Women's Footballer of the Year: 2025
