= Marie Minnaert =

Belgian footballer (born 1999)

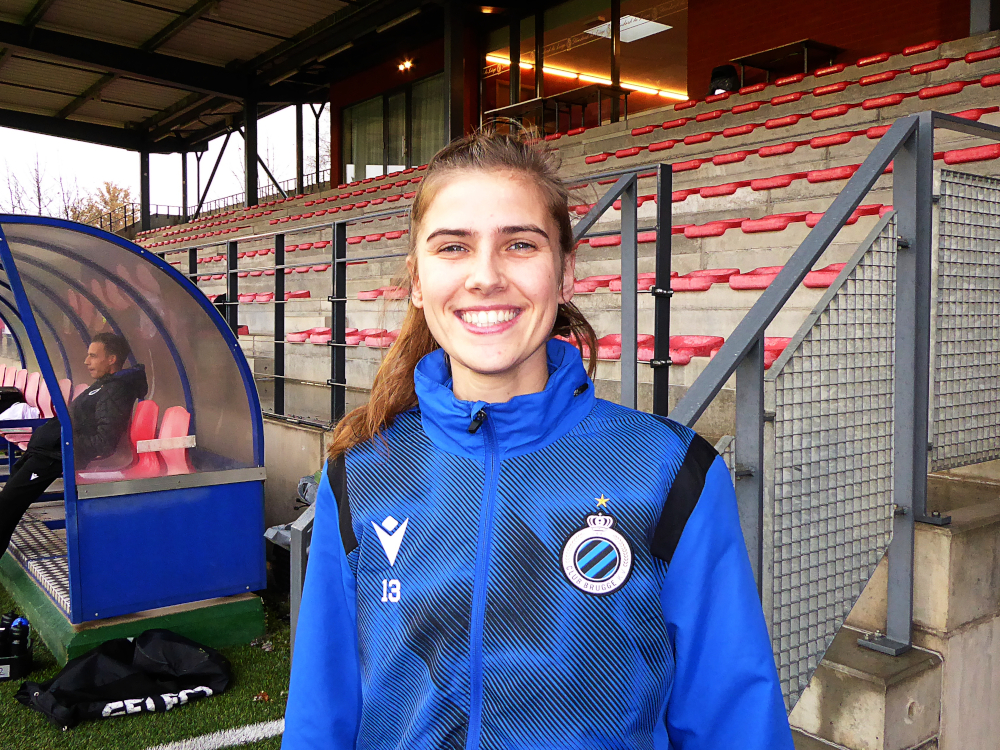
- Minnaert in 2021

Personal information
- Date of birth: 5 May 1999 (age 27)
- Place of birth: Belgium
- Height: 1.84 m (6 ft 0 in)
- Position: Midfielder

Team information
- Current team: Anderlecht
- Number: 16

Senior career*
Years	Team	Apps	(Gls)
2015–2020	KAA Gent	85	(26)
2020–2022	Club YLA	47	(25)
2022–	Anderlecht	23	(14)

International career^{‡}
2014–2016	Belgium U17	13	(6)
2016–2018	Belgium U19	14	(6)
2019–	Belgium	32	(3)
- * Club domestic league appearances and goals as of 16 July 2023 ‡ National team caps and goals as of 19 November 2024

Marie Minnaert (born 5 May 1999) is a Belgian footballer who plays as a midfielder for Anderlecht and the Belgium women's national team.

== Club career ==
Breaking into the KAA Gent first team in 2015, Minnaert ended her second season in top-class Belgian football by playing in the Buffalos' first ever Cup success, a 3–1 victory over Anderlecht to win the 2017 Belgian Women's Cup Final.

After being beaten 3–2 by Genk in the following year's Cup semi-final, Gent returned to the Cup Final in 2019, defeating Standard Fémina de Liège 2–0 with Mariam Toloba and Minnaert scoring the goals.

Minnaert spent two seasons with Club YLA from 2020, moving to reigning champions Anderlecht in 2022, winning back-to-back titles in 2023 and 2024 with the Mauves.

== International career ==
Minnaert made her international debut with the Belgium Red Flames in a 3–0 victory over Slovakia on 27 February 2019.

At the start of 2022, Minnaert helped Belgium win the Pinatar Cup in Spain for the first time, beating Russia on penalties in the final after a 0–0 draw.

Minnaert was named in the Belgium squad for Euro 2022 in England. In their second appearance at the continental finals, the Red Flames finished second in Group D behind group favourites France, against whom they conceded a narrow defeat (1–2), but ahead of Iceland with a 1–1 draw and Italy, who they edged out 1–0. Belgium lost 1–0 to Sweden in the quarter-finals.

She went on to contribute to Belgium's successful qualification for UEFA Women's Euro 2025 via the play-offs, playing in the group games of the qualifiers, but missing the play-off final against Ukraine on 3 December 2024.

== Career statistics ==
As of match played 6 October 2022
Scores and results list Belgium's goal tally first, score column indicates score after each Minnaert goal.

List of international goals scored by Marie Minnaert
No.	Date	Venue	Opponent	Score	Result	Competition
1	27 October 2020	Sūduva Stadium, Marijampolė, Lithuania	Lithuania	9–0	9–0	UEFA Women's Euro 2022 qualifying
2	18 February 2021	King Baudouin Stadium, Brussels, Belgium	Netherlands	1–2	1–6	Friendly
3	12 April 2022	Fadil Vokrri Stadium, Pristina, Kosovo	Kosovo	6–1	6–1	2023 FIFA Women's World Cup qualification

== Honours ==
Gent

- Belgian Women's Cup: 2017, 2019

Anderlecht

- Belgian Women's Super League: 2022–23, 2023–24

Belgium

- Pinatar Cup: 2022
