= Hannah Eurlings =

Belgian footballer (born 2003)

Personal information
- Date of birth: 1 January 2003 (age 23)
- Place of birth: Belgium
- Position: Forward

Team information
- Current team: Union Berlin
- Number: 14

Senior career*
Years	Team	Apps	(Gls)
2019–2025	OH Leuven	99	(32)
2025-	Union Berlin	12	(2)

International career^{‡}
2018–2020	Belgium U17	17	(3)
2020–	Belgium	34	(6)
- * Club domestic league appearances and goals as of 24 May 2026 ‡ National team caps and goals as of 5 December 2024

Hannah Eurlings (born 1 January 2003) is a Belgian footballer who plays as a forward for Union Berlin and the Belgium national team.

== Club career ==
Eurlings finished runner-up in the Belgian Women's Super League three seasons in a row with OH Leuven, in 2020-21, 2021–22 and 2022–23. Leuven went on to finish top of the regular season for the 2023-24 campaign, but finished third in the title play-offs as Anderlecht came from behind to take the crown for a seventh season in a row.

== International career ==
Eurlings made her debut for the Belgium national team on 1 December 2020, coming on as a substitute for Tessa Wullaert against Switzerland.

At the start of 2022, Eurlings helped Belgium win the Pinatar Cup in Spain for the first time, beating Russia on penalties in the final after a 0–0 draw.

She was named in the Belgium squad for UEFA Women's Euro 2022 in England, where the Red Flames were beaten in the quarter-finals 1–0 by Sweden. She went on to contribute to Belgium's successful qualification for UEFA Women's Euro 2025 via the play-offs, starting both legs of the play-off final against Ukraine.

She went on to contribute to Belgium's successful qualification for UEFA Women's Euro 2025 via the play-offs, playing both legs of the semi-final victory over Greece and also the play-off final against Ukraine on 3 December 2024.

On 11 June 2025, Eurlings was called up to the Belgium squad for the UEFA Women's Euro 2025.

== Career statistics ==
As of match played 6 October 2022
Scores and results list Belgium's goal tally first, score column indicates score after each Eurlings goal.

List of international goals scored by Hannah Eurlings
No.	Cap	Date	Venue	Opponent	Score	Result	Competition
1	8	25 November 2021	Den Dreef, Leuven, Belgium	Armenia	1–0	19–0	2023 FIFA Women's World Cup qualifying
2	8	25 November 2021	Den Dreef, Leuven, Belgium	Armenia	7–0	19–0	2023 FIFA Women's World Cup qualifying
3	9	30 November 2021	Den Dreef, Leuven, Belgium	Poland	2–0	4–0	2023 FIFA Women's World Cup qualifying
4	10	16 February 2022	Pinatar Arena, San Pedro del Pinatar, Spain	Slovakia	1–0	4–0	2022 Pinatar Cup
5	18	6 September 2022	Yerevan Football Academy Stadium, Yerevan, Armenia	Armenia	1–0	7–0	2023 FIFA Women's World Cup qualification
6	20	12 November 2022	Joseph Marien Stadium, Brussels, Belgium	Slovakia	5–0	7–0	Friendly
7	39	7 July 2025	Arena Thun, Thun, Switzerland	Spain	2–2	2–6	UEFA Women's Euro 2025
8	40	3 March 2026	BSC Stadium, Budaörs, Hungary	Israel	2–0	3–0	2027 FIFA Women's World Cup qualification
9	44	5 June 2026	Den Dreef, Leuven, Belgium	Luxembourg	1–0	6–0	2027 FIFA Women's World Cup qualification

== Honours ==
Belgium

- Pinatar Cup: 2022
