= Féli Delacauw =

Belgian footballer

Personal information
- Full name: Féli Petra Delacauw
- Date of birth: 4 April 2002 (age 24)
- Place of birth: Snellegem, Belgium
- Position: Midfielder

Team information
- Current team: TSG Hoffenheim
- Number: 24

Senior career*
Years	Team	Apps	(Gls)
2019–2022	Gent	41	(11)
2022–2024	Fortuna Sittard	34	(9)
2024–	TSG Hoffenheim	28	(3)

International career^{‡}
2018–2019	Belgium U17	5	(0)
2021–	Belgium	33	(1)
- * Club domestic league appearances and goals as of 24 May 2026 ‡ National team caps and goals as of 5 December 2024

Féli Petra Delacauw (born 4 April 2002) is a Belgian footballer who plays as a midfielder for German club TSG Hoffenheim in the Frauen Bundesliga and the Belgium national team.

== International career ==
Delacauw made her debut for the Belgium national team on 21 February 2021, coming on as a substitute for Lenie Onzia against Germany.

She was named in the Belgium squad for UEFA Women's Euro 2022 in England, where the Red Flames were beaten in the quarter-finals 1–0 by Sweden. She went on to contribute to Belgium's successful qualification for UEFA Women's Euro 2025 via the play-offs, starting both legs of the play-off final against Ukraine.

== International goals ==
No.	Date	Venue	Opponent	Score	Result	Competition
1.	9 April 2024	Viborg Stadium, Viborg, Denmark	Denmark	2–4	2–4	UEFA Women's Euro 2025 qualifying
