= Jody Vangheluwe =

Belgian footballer

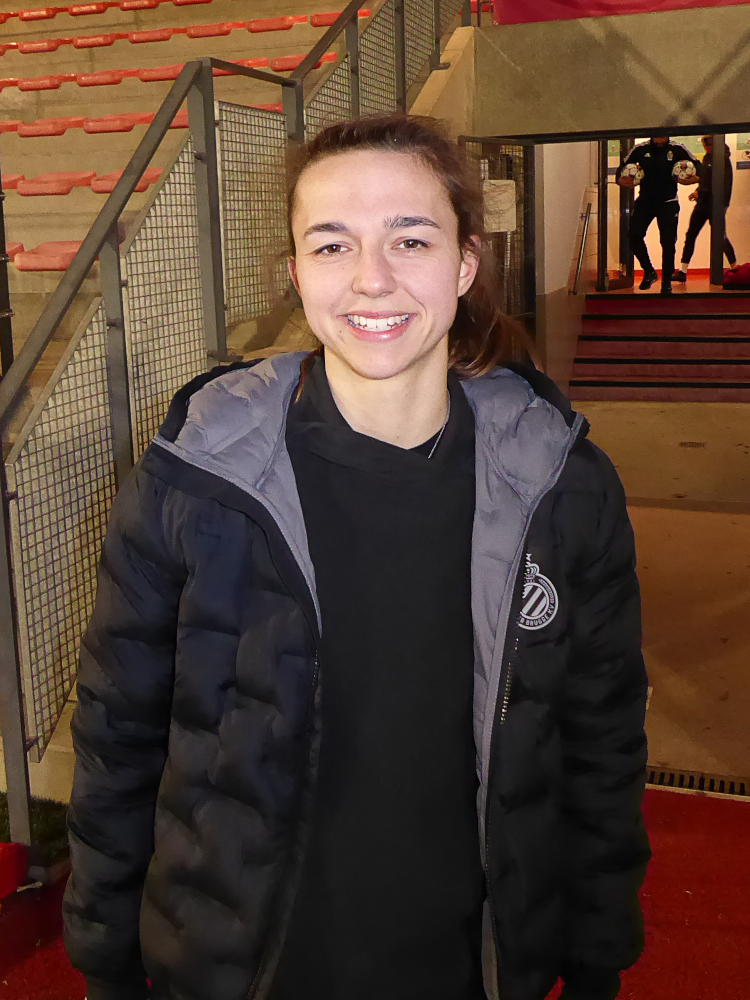

Personal information
- Date of birth: 15 July 1997 (age 29)
- Place of birth: Belgium
- Height: 1.61 m (5 ft 3 in)
- Position: Defender

Team information
- Current team: Club YLA
- Number: 22

Senior career*
Years	Team	Apps	(Gls)
2013-2015	Club YLA	0	(0)
2015-2019	Gent	0	(0)
2019-	Club YLA	72	(6)

International career^{‡}
2012–2013	Belgium U17	13	(1)
2014–2016	Belgium U19	14	(0)
2019–	Belgium	13	(0)
- * Club domestic league appearances and goals as of 26 December 2023 (UTC) ‡ National team caps and goals as of 00:50, 11 September 2022 (UTC)

Jody Vangheluwe (born 15 July 1997) is a Belgian footballer who plays as a defender for Women's Super League club Club YLA and the Belgium women's national team.
