= Nina Stapelfeldt =

Swiss footballer (born 1995)

Personal information
- Full name: Nina Karin Stapelfeldt
- Date of birth: 13 April 1995 (age 31)
- Place of birth: Hünenberg, Switzerland
- Height: 1.78 m (5 ft 10 in)
- Position: Forward

Team information
- Current team: SSD Brescia Calcio Femminile

Youth career
- FC Menzo Reinach
- 2009–2011: SC Kriens

Senior career*
Years	Team	Apps	(Gls)
2011–2014	SC Kriens	43	(3)
2014–2015	Zürich	25	(0)
2015–2018	Luzern	55	(20)
2018–2019	FC Twente	17	(4)
2019–2020	Gent	16	(8)
2020–2021	Soyaux	20	(4)
2021–2022	Milan	23	(7)
2022–2023	Como	7	(1)
2023–	Brescia	0	(0)

International career^{‡}
	Switzerland U17	8	(0)
	Switzerland U19	17	(2)
2019–	Switzerland	1	(0)
- * Club domestic league appearances and goals as of 11 September 2022 ‡ National team caps and goals as of 14:44, 19 June 2022 (UTC)

Nina Karin Stapelfeldt (born 13 April 1995) is a Swiss professional footballer who plays as a forward for Italian Serie B club Brescia and the Switzerland national team.

== International career ==
Stapelfeldt made her debut for the Switzerland national team on 29 May 2019, as a substitute for Marilena Widmer in a 3–1 friendly defeat by Italy in Ferrara.
