= Sandra Sigurðardóttir =

Icelandic footballer

Personal information
- Full name: Sandra Sigurðardóttir
- Date of birth: 2 October 1986 (age 40)
- Place of birth: Iceland
- Position: Goalkeeper

Senior career*
| Years | Team | Apps | (Gls) |
| 2001–2004 | Þór/KA/KS | 40 | (0) |
| 2005–2016 | Stjarnan | 168 | (1) |
| 2011 | Jitex | 7 | (0) |
| 2016– | Valur | 123 | (0) |
| 2023 | → Grindavík | 2 | (0) |
| Total | | 338 | (1) |

International career^{‡}
| 2002–2003 | Iceland U-16 | 6 | (0) |
| 2003 | Iceland U-17 | 3 | (0) |
| 2002–2004 | Iceland U-19 | 5 | (0) |
| 2015 | Iceland U-23 | 1 | (0) |
| 2005–2023 | Iceland | 49 | (0) |
- * Club domestic league appearances and goals as of 5 March 2023 ‡ National team caps and goals as of 5 March 2023

Sandra Sigurðardóttir (born 2 October 1986) is an Icelandic football goalkeeper. Sandra has played for Iceland's national team and was a squad member at the 2009 and 2013 editions of the UEFA Women's Championship. During her career, she won six Icelandic championships and four Icelandic Cups. She retired in 2023 as the Besta deild kvenna's all-time leader in games played.

== Club career ==
In 2011, Sandra signed for Swedish Damallsvenskan team Jitex BK. A contract dispute followed and Sandra quickly left, but she was not allowed to play for Stjarnan again until FIFA ruled in her favour. In 2016, Sandra signed for Valur. In June 2017, she became the Úrvalsdeild kvenna all-time leader in matches played, after breaking Sigurlín Jónsdóttir's 18-year-old record of 233 matches. In May 2021, she broke the 300 match barrier.

In March 2023, she announced her retirement from football. In end of June, she returned to football and was sent on a loan to Grindavík for two games. Following the loan, she returned to Valur's roster.

== International career ==
Sandra made her senior Iceland debut in a 3–0 defeat by the United States in July 2005. She was seen as the national team's third choice goalkeeper behind Þóra Björg Helgadóttir and Guðbjörg Gunnarsdóttir and collected five more caps during the next five years.

National team coach Siggi Eyjólfsson selected Sandra in the Iceland squad for UEFA Women's Euro 2013 in Sweden.

In September 2023, she was selected again to the national team after initially having retired from football in March the same year.

== Private life ==
Sandra was married to Icelandic sport manager Hafdís Inga Hinriksdóttir, they got divorced 2021. They have two children together.
