= KAA Gent (women) =

Gent
- Full name: KAA Gent Ladies
- Founded: 1996 (damesploeg KSK Cercle Melle); 2011 (Melle Ladies); 2012 (AA Gent Ladies)
- Ground: Chillax Arena, Ghent
- Capacity: 6500
- Chairman: Dominique Reyns
- Manager: Jaques Heleen
- League: Super League
- 2025–26: 7th
Home colours	Away colours

KAA Gent Ladies is the women's section of KAA Gent. It was founded in 1996 as Melle Ladies. In 2012 their name changed to AA Gent Ladies.

In 2017 the team won the Belgian Women's Cup for the first time.

== Players ==
=== Current squad ===
As of 9 September 2026

Note: Flags indicate national team as defined under FIFA eligibility rules; some limited exceptions apply. Players may hold more than one non-FIFA nationality.

No.	Pos.	Nation	Player
1	GK	BEL	Riet Maes (captain)
2	DF	BEL	Caitlin Lievens
3	DF	BEL	Chionne Bonny
4	DF	BEL	Inara Bouker
5	DF	BEL	Silke Speeckaert
6	MF	BEL	Lotte Engels
7	MF	NED	Iris Stiekema
8	MF	BEL	Emma Van Britsom
9	MF	BEL	Fleur Heyman
10	FW	BEL	Anissa Giuga
11	FW	BEL	Roos Willemsen
13	MF	BEL	Yannah Van Kerrebroeck
14	FW	BEL	Nena Retsin
15	DF	BEL	Ines Van Gansbeke

No.	Pos.	Nation	Player
16	FW	BEL	Fleur Van Daele
17	DF	BEL	Esteé Cattoor
20	GK	BEL	Zoë van Wijmeersch
21	DF	BEL	Beau Wispelaere
22	MF	BEL	Axelle Bamps
24	DF	BEL	Romy Vergote
26	MF	BEL	Finnelotte Valcke
28	MF	BEL	Tess Lameir
30	MF	BEL	Jozefien Demedts
91	GK	BEL	Zoë Marianne Desoete
—	DF	BEL	Lise Bal
—	MF	BEL	Lola Van Luyten
—	FW	BEL	Marie Degroote

=== Former players ===
For details of current and former players, see Category:K.A.A. Gent (women) players.

- (Morocco) Samya Hassani
- (Belgium) Nicky Evrard
- (Belgium) Jassina Blom
- (Switzerland) Nina Stapelfeldt
- (Belgium) Marie Minnaert
- (Morocco) Rkia Mazrouai
- (Belgium) Shari Van Belle
- (Belgium) Elena Dhont
- (Belgium) Kassandra Missipo
- (Belgium) Lyndsey Van Belle
- (Belgium) Lenie Onzia
- (Belgium) Chloë Vande Velde
- (Belgium) Isabelle Iliano
- (Belgium) Heleen Jaques
- (Belgium) Silke Vanwynsberghe
- (Belgium) Féli Delacauw

== Head coaches ==
- (Belgium) Dirk Decoen (2012–2013)
- (Belgium) Dave Mattheus (2013–2022)
- (Belgium) Jorn Van Ginderdeuren (2022–2024)
- (Belgium) Heleen Jaques, 21 June 2024

== Staff ==
- (Belgium) Jorn Van Ginderdeuren (head coach)
- (Belgium) Angelo Gaytant (assistant coach)
- (Belgium) Bram Gettemans (Physical Coach)
- (Belgium) Gilles Dhont (goalkeeping coach)
- (Belgium) --(performance analyst)
- (Belgium) Pascal Bleys (Fitness coach)
- (Belgium) Anton Leurquain (physio)
- (Belgium) Hannelore Malfliet (Teamdoctor)
