= Pinatar Arena =

Association football stadium in Spain

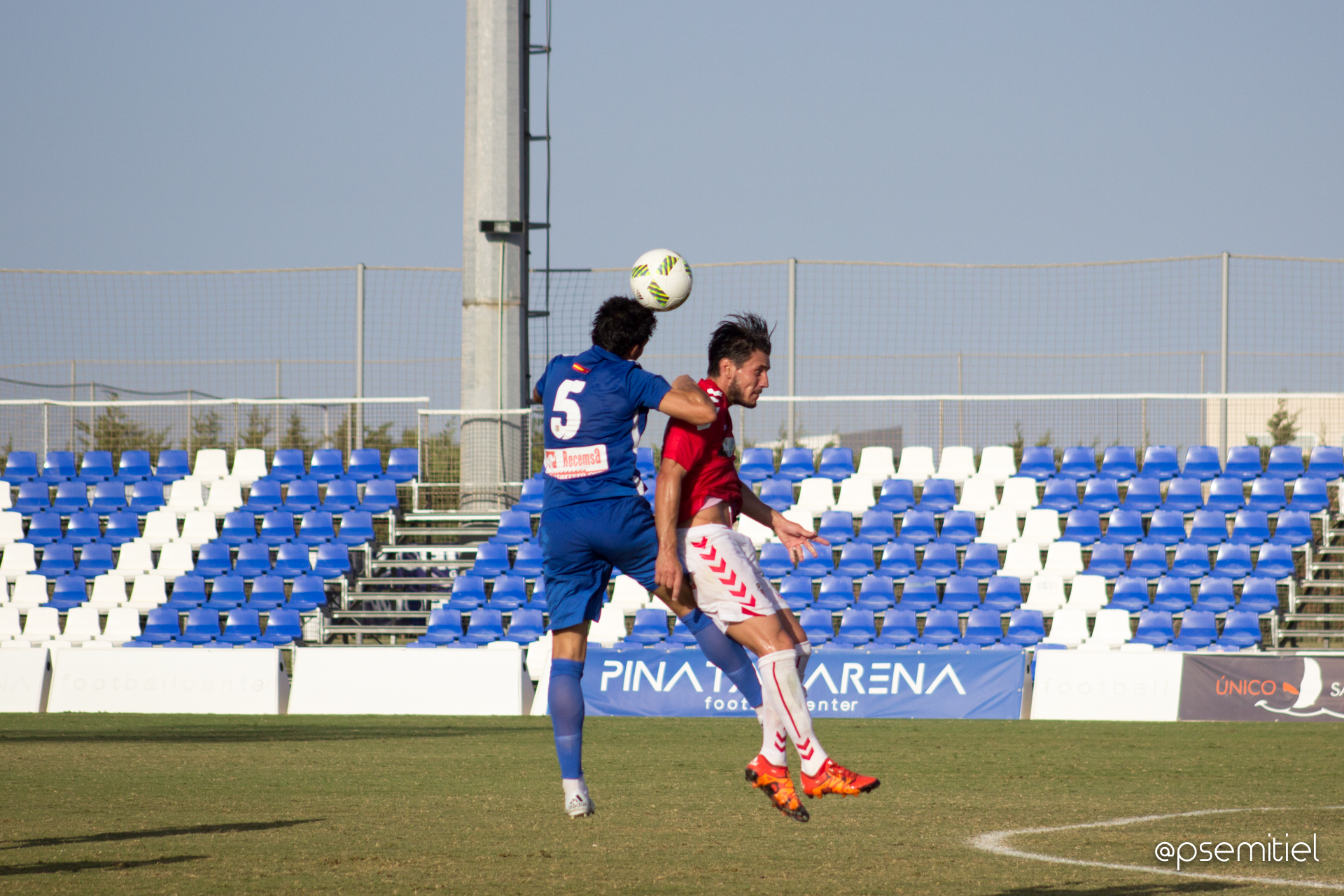
- Real Murcia in action at the arena
- Interactive map of Pinatar Arena
- Location: San Pedro del Pinatar, Spain
- Owner: Pinatar Arena Football Center Sociedad Limitada
- Capacity: 3,000
- Surface: Grass
- Field size: 105 m × 68 m (344 ft × 223 ft)

Construction
- Opened: January 2013

The Pinatar Arena is an association football stadium located in San Pedro del Pinatar, Murcia, in south-eastern Spain. The 3,000-seat stadium is part of the larger Pinatar Arena Football Center which also includes a sports club, hotel, training fields and other amenities.

== Events ==
Since opening in January 2013, it has become a popular destination for training camps and friendly matches by association football national teams. It has also hosted some of Europe's professional football clubs for friendlies, including St Johnstone, Sunderland A.F.C., Newcastle United, Ipswich Town, Mallorca, Preston North End, Bradford City, Swansea City, Cardiff City, Port Vale F.C and Southend United.
