= Belgium women's national football team =

Belgium
- Nickname: Belgian Red Flames
- Association: Royal Belgian Football Association (KBVB/URBSFA)
- Confederation: UEFA (Europe)
- Head coach: Lenie Onzia
- Captain: Tessa Wullaert
- Most caps: Janice Cayman (176)
- Top scorer: Tessa Wullaert (105)
- Home stadium: Den Dreef (Leuven)
- FIFA code: BEL
First colours	Second colours

FIFA ranking
- Current: 20 ▼2 (20 October 2026)
- Highest: 17 (December 2019 – December 2020)
- Lowest: 35 (November 2010 – July 2011)

First international
- France 1–2 Belgium (Reims, France; 30 May 1976)

Biggest win
- Belgium 19–0 Armenia (Leuven, Belgium; 25 November 2021)

Biggest defeat
- Norway 8–0 Belgium (Kolbotn, Norway; 26 September 1992); Spain 9–1 Belgium (Alginet, Spain; 29 February 2004)

European Championship
- Appearances: 3 (first in 2017)
- Best result: Quarter-finals (2022)

The Belgium women's national football team, (Note: Dutch: Belgisch vrouwenvoetbalelftal, French: équipe de Belgique féminine de football, German: Belgische Fußballnationalmannschaft der Frauen) nicknamed the Belgian Red Flames, represents Belgium in international women's football. It is controlled by the Royal Belgian Football Association, the governing body for football in Belgium. Their home stadium is Den Dreef and their current head coach is Lenie Onzia. During most of their history the team has had poor results but showed improvement in the Euro 2013 and 2015 World Cup Qualifiers. In 2016, they qualified for their first major tournament: Euro 2017. In 2022, they won the Pinatar Cup in San Pedro del Pinatar (Spain).

== History ==
=== Early days (1976–1984) ===
Belgium played its first match against France on May 30, 1976 at Stade Auguste Delaune in Reims, France. The game ended in a 2–1 victory. A year after this debut, the Belgian team played against Switzerland and France, tying both matches, 2–2 and 1–1 respectively. The next year, they faced the same opposition once more and won both games by scores of 1–0 and 2–0. Another victory followed against Yugoslavia with 1–0. The team's first defeat however came at the hands of England: 3–0, which was followed by a 2–0 loss against France and a 2–2 tie against the Netherlands. In the following years, Belgium kept playing mostly against European teams. The team has steadily built a reputation for technical skill and disciplined play, becoming a competitive force in European women's football.

=== First tournaments (1984–1989) ===
Belgium participated in qualifications for the first time for the 1984 European Competition for Women's Football. They were sorted in Group 4 with the Netherlands, Denmark and West Germany. The campaign started off well with a 3–2 victory over the Netherlands, but continued with a 1–0 loss against Denmark and a 1–1 draw against West Germany. Despite having a neutral goal difference at this point, the Belgian team ended up last in the group after a 5–0 defeat against the Netherlands and draws against their other two opponents, 2–2 against Denmark and 1–1 against West Germany.

Their second attempt at qualifying was for the 1987 European Competition, where they were joined in Group 3 by France, the Netherlands again and Sweden. Their games against France were one win and one loss, both 3–1. Their matches against their two other opponents however were all defeats: 3–1 and 3–0 against The Netherlands, and 5–0 and 2–1 against Sweden. This resulted in Belgium again ending last in the group.

In attempting to qualify for the 1989 tournament they did better. They played in Group 4 against four other teams: Czechoslovakia, France, Spain and Bulgaria. Among the eight games, they won two, drew four and lost two, with 7 goals for and 4 against. This earned them third place in the group of five, which did not suffice for qualification.

=== Stagnation (1990–2011) ===
The Belgian team suffered a series of poor results from 1990 to 2011. They never won even half of their matches in any of the qualification campaigns during this period, except for one. This notable exception was the 2003 Women's World Cup qualifiers, where they won five games and suffered only one loss. Scotland however had achieved the same result and with better goal difference, leaving Belgium second in their group. This was nevertheless Belgium's best performance at the World Cup qualifiers until 2019 when they went out in the play-offs. It was followed by their worst: they lost all eight games in the next iteration (2007). At the UEFA Women's Euro qualifications, their best performances during this period were at the 1995 edition and the 2009 edition, both times losing 'only' half of their matches and drawing one.

=== Improvements (2011–2018) ===
An era of victories began when Ives Serneels replaced Anne Noë as manager in 2011. Serneels led the team to improved qualification campaigns for Euro 2013 and 2015 World Cup, both times ending third in the group (just short of qualifying). Between both campaigns, the Belgian female football team adopted the nickname "Belgian Red Flames". Following the improvements, the RBFA invested in more growth in 2015, targeting qualification for Euro 2017. After a successful start in their qualifications group, the team was invited to play at the 2016 Algarve Cup in Portugal, one of the most prestigious women's international football events.

Belgium finished second in their Euro 2017 qualifications group (after England), which was enough to earn them their first ever qualification for a major tournament. At the European championship Belgium secured a 2–0 upset win over Norway during the group stage. However, after losing 1–0 to Denmark and 2–1 to the Netherlands, they finished third in their group and did not advance to the knockout rounds.

=== First success (2019–2022) ===
Belgium performed well in UEFA World Cup Qualifying for the 2019 World Cup and secured second place in Group 6 behind Italy. As a result, they qualified for the UEFA Play-offs as they were one of the top 4 ranked second place teams. Switzerland, the Netherlands and Denmark were the other teams in the play-off. Belgium faced Switzerland in their play-off semi-final, after two legs the aggregate score was 3–3, but Switzerland advanced on away goals. The Netherlands went on to defeat Switzerland in the play-off final to claim the final UEFA qualifying spot at the 2019 World Cup.
In 2019, Belgium also finished third during the 2019 Cyprus cup after defeating Austria on penalties.

In 2022, Belgium won the Pinatar Cup, a friendly tournament held in Spain, beating Russia on penalties. Euro 2022 was a success for Belgium, who managed to get out of the first round and reach the quarter-finals for the first time in their second appearance at the continental finals. The Red Flames finished 2nd in Group D behind France, the group's favorite against whom they conceded a narrow defeat (1–2), but ahead of Iceland and Italy after a 1–1 draw against the former and a 1–0 victory against the latter (an outgoing quarter-finalists of the 2019 World Cup), in the last match. All this combined with the lack of a victory for the Icelandic women against the French, who were already assured a finish in first place of the group, in the other match (1–1). This historic qualification was made possible in part by the performance of Belgian goalkeeper Nicky Evrard, who saved two penalties in each of the first two games (against Iceland and France). Belgium faced Sweden in the quarter-finals, the winner of group C and silver medalist at the Olympic games in Tokyo. The Belgians lost by a score of 0–1 at the end of the match and saw their journey end at this stage of the competition.

== Team image ==
=== Nicknames ===
At the start of the qualifying campaign for the 2015 World Cup in Canada, the team earned their first and current nickname: the "Belgian Red Flames". Prior to that, they were simply known as "Rode Duivelinnen" (Red Devil Ladies).

=== Kits and crest ===
On September 19, 2022 the RBFA presented new home kits. This was the first time that a unified look was presented for all Belgian national teams. It replaces the one-off black home shirt which was released earlier in support of women's football in Belgium.
The kit comes with a red base, and black and yellow details representing the Belgian flag. The jersey features a dynamic graphic print of flames on both sleeves, hinting at the team's nickname "Red Flames".

==== Kit suppliers ====
Adidas	Period	Ref
Home kit 2022	2022–present	
Home kit 2021	2021–2022	

=== Home stadium ===
The team plays their home matches mostly at Den Dreef but occasionally at other stadiums in Belgium.

== Results and fixtures ==
The following is a list of match results in the last 12 months, as well as any future matches that have been scheduled.

Legend

Win Draw Loss Fixture

=== 2025 ===
28 November Friendly	Switzerland	1–2	Belgium	Jerez, Spain
19:00 UTC+0				Stadium: Estadio Municipal de Chapín

1 December Friendly	Finland	1–1	Belgium	Sanlúcar de Barrameda, Spain
19:00	Sevenius 34'		Janssens 12'	Stadium: Estadio El Pamar

=== 2026 ===
3 March 2027 FIFA Women's World Cup qualification	Israel	0–3	Belgium	Budaörs (Hungary) (Note: Due to the Gaza war, Israel are required to play their home matches at neutral venues until further notice.)
19:30		Report (FIFA); Report (UEFA)	Wullaert 26'; Eurlings 42'; Janssen 89'	Stadium: BSC Stadium; Attendance: 0 Referee: Michaela Pachtová (Czech Republic)

7 March 2027 FIFA Women's World Cup qualification	Belgium	5–0	Israel	Budaörs, Hungary
17:00	Wullaert 10', 16', 66' (pen.); Mertens 19'; Missipo 90+3'	Report (FIFA); Report (UEFA)		Stadium: BSC Stadium; Attendance: 0 Referee: Rasa Grigonė (Lithuania)

14 April 2027 FIFA Women's World Cup qualification	Scotland	1–1	Belgium	Edinburgh, Scotland
20:30	McGovern 90+5'	Report (FIFA); Report (UEFA)	Kees 15'	Stadium: Easter Road; Attendance: 4,522; Referee: Lotta Vuorio (Finland)

18 April 2027 FIFA Women's World Cup qualification	Belgium	0–0	Scotland	Leuven, Belgium
20:30		Report (FIFA); Report (UEFA)		Stadium: Den Dreef; Attendance: 4,052; Referee: Réka Molnar (Hungary)

5 June 2027 FIFA Women's World Cup qualification	Belgium	6–0	Luxembourg	Leuven, Belgium
20:15				Stadium: Den Dreef

9 June 2027 FIFA Women's World Cup qualification	Luxembourg	0–7	Belgium	Esch-sur-Alzette, Luxembourg
				Stadium: Stade de la Frontière

9 October 2027 FIFA Women's World Cup qualification	Belgium	1–0	Poland	Leuven, Belgium
20:15	Dhont 45+1'	Report (FIFA); Report (UEFA)		Stadium: Den Dreef; Attendance: 6,238; Referee: Emanuela Rusta (Albania)

13 October 2027 FIFA Women's World Cup qualification	Poland	3–2	Belgium	Gdańsk, Poland
18:00	Pajor 42', 116'; Tomasiak 67'	Report (FIFA); Report (UEFA)	Littel 51'; Teulings 105'	Stadium: Gdańsk Stadium; Referee: Ivana Martinčić (Croatia)

1 December Friendly	Belgium	v	South Korea	Girona, Spain

=== 2027 ===
2 March 2027 UEFA Women's Nations League	Serbia	–	Belgium	Serbia
		Report

6 March 2027 UEFA Women's Nations League	Romania	–	Belgium	Romania
		Report

20 April 2027 UEFA Women's Nations League	Belgium	–	Romania	Belgium
		Report

24 April 2027 UEFA Women's Nations League	Albania	–	Belgium	Albania
		Report

11 June 2027 UEFA Women's Nations League	Belgium	–	Albania	Belgium
		Report

15 June 2027 UEFA Women's Nations League	Belgium	–	Serbia	Belgium
		Report

== Coaching staff ==
=== Current coaching staff ===
As of 10 November 2026

Role	Name
Head coach	(Belgium) Lenie Onzia
Assistant coach	(Belgium) Kevin Bogemans
Senior Technical Advisor	(Austria) Irene Fuhrmann
Goalkeeping coach	(Belgium) Frank Verwimp
Performance analyst	(United Kingdom) Tom Goodall
Performance analyst	(Belgium) Jonas Van Dyck
Physical coach	(Belgium) Milan Vandecaetsbeek
Nutritionist	(Belgium) Janne Geers
Team doctor	(Belgium) Karolien Lemmens
Team doctor	(Belgium) Kris Peeters
Physiotherapist	(Belgium) Loes Meulemans
Physiotherapist	(Belgium) Iris Vandewiele
Manager women's football	(Belgium) Lois Otte

=== Manager history ===
- (Belgium) Albert Bers (1976–1991)
- (Belgium) Marc Van Geersom (1991–1994)
- (Belgium) Johan Bol (1994–1999)
- (Belgium) Anne Noë (1999–2010)
- (Belgium) Ives Serneels (2011–2024)
- (Iceland) Elísabet Gunnarsdóttir (2025–2026)
- (Belgium) Lenie Onzia (2026-

== Players ==
=== Current squad ===
The following players were called up for the friendly match against South Korea on 5 and 9 June 2026.

Caps and goals are correct as of 13 October 2026, after the match against Poland.

No.	Pos.	Player	Date of birth (age)	Caps	Goals	Club
	GK	Nicky Evrard	26 May 1995 (age 31)	80	0	(Royal Dutch Football Association) PSV
	GK	Lisa Lichtfus	28 December 1999 (age 26)	21	0	(German Football Association) Hoffenheim
	GK	Diede Lemey	7 October 1996 (age 30)	10	0	(Royal Dutch Football Association) Twente
	GK	Lowiese Seynhaeve	29 December 1999 (age 26)	3	0	(Royal Belgian Football Association) OH Leuven
	DF	Janice Cayman	12 October 1988 (age 38)	178	49	(Royal Dutch Football Association) PSV
	DF	Amber Tysiak	26 January 2000 (age 26)	53	7	(German Football Association) Union Berlin
	DF	Sari Kees	17 February 2001 (age 25)	52	6	(Royal Dutch Football Association) Ajax
	DF	Jill Janssens	3 October 2003 (age 23)	51	6	(German Football Association) Union Berlin
	DF	Zenia Mertens	27 February 2001 (age 25)	18	1	(German Football Association) RB Leipzig
	DF	Isabelle Iliano	2 March 1997 (age 29)	17	1	(Royal Belgian Football Association) Club YLA
	DF	Saar Janssen	22 July 2005 (age 21)	14	1	(Royal Belgian Football Association) OH Leuven
	DF	Constance Brackman	15 August 2003 (age 23)	4	0	(French Football Federation) Nantes
	DF	Amy Littel	15 April 2004 (age 22)	1	1	(Royal Belgian Football Association) Club YLA
	DF	Lina Meeuwis	25 September 2003 (age 23)	0	0	(Royal Belgian Football Association) Anderlecht
	MF	Kassandra Missipo	3 February 1998 (age 28)	78	3	(The Football Association) Sunderland
	MF	Elena Dhont	27 March 1998 (age 28)	54	5	(German Football Association) Werder Bremen
	MF	Marie Detruyer	13 January 2004 (age 22)	38	5	(Italian Football Federation) Inter Milan
	MF	Jarne Teulings	11 January 2002 (age 24)	38	3	(German Football Association) Eintracht Frankfurt
	MF	Luna Vanzeir	7 January 2003 (age 23)	7	0	(German Football Association) Werder Bremen
	MF	Karlijn Helsen	20 February 2004 (age 22)	0	0	(Royal Belgian Football Association) Anderlecht
	FW	Tessa Wullaert (captain)	19 March 1993 (age 33)	160	105	(Italian Football Federation) Como
	FW	Jassina Blom	3 September 1994 (age 32)	41	11	(Royal Spanish Football Federation) Sevilla
	FW	Mariam Toloba	20 September 1999 (age 27)	24	2	(French Football Federation) Paris FC
	FW	Lore Jacobs	27 April 2005 (age 21)	6	0	(Royal Dutch Football Association) PSV
	FW	Aurélie Reynders	8 July 2007 (age 19)	6	0	(French Football Federation) Paris FC

=== Recent call-ups ===
The following players have also been called up to the squad within the past 12 months.

Pos.	Player	Date of birth (age)	Caps	Goals	Club	Latest call-up
GK	Femke Bastiaen	11 April 2001 (age 25)	1	0	(Netherlands) Utrecht	v. Israel, 7 March 2026
DF	Jasmien Mathys	7 January 2002 (age 24)	4	0	(Germany) RB Leipzig	v. Poland, 13 October 2026
DF	Laura Deloose ^{RET}	18 June 1993 (age 33)	112	5	(Belgium) Anderlecht	v. Finland, 1 December 2025
MF	Alixe Bosteels	29 May 2004 (age 22)	0	0	(Belgium) OH Leuven	v. Poland, 13 October 2026
MF	Valesca Ampoorter	6 June 2004 (age 22)	11	0	(Germany) TSG Hoffenheim	v. Luxembourg, 9 June 2026
MF	Justine Vanhaevermaet	29 April 1992 (age 34)	82	10	(England) Crystal Palace	v. Israel, 7 March 2026
MF	Tine De Caigny	9 June 1997 (age 29)	113	43	(Belgium) Anderlecht	v. Finland, 1 December 2025
MF	Sarah Wijnants	13 October 1999 (age 27)	44	3	(Italy) Fiorentina	v. Finland, 1 December 2025
FW	Hannah Eurlings	1 January 2003 (age 23)	49	11	(Germany) Union Berlin	v. Luxembourg, 9 June 2026
FW	Ella Van Kerkhoven	20 November 1993 (age 33)	35	16	(Netherlands) Twente	v. Israel, 7 March 2026
FW	Lisa Petry	12 February 2001 (age 25)	6	0	(Belgium) Club YLA	v. Republic of Ireland, 28 October 2025
Notes: ^{INJ} = Withdrew due to injury; ^{PRE} = Preliminary squad / standby; ^{RET} = Retired from the national team

== Individual records ==
As of 9 June 2026

Players in bold are still active with the national team.

=== Most appearances ===
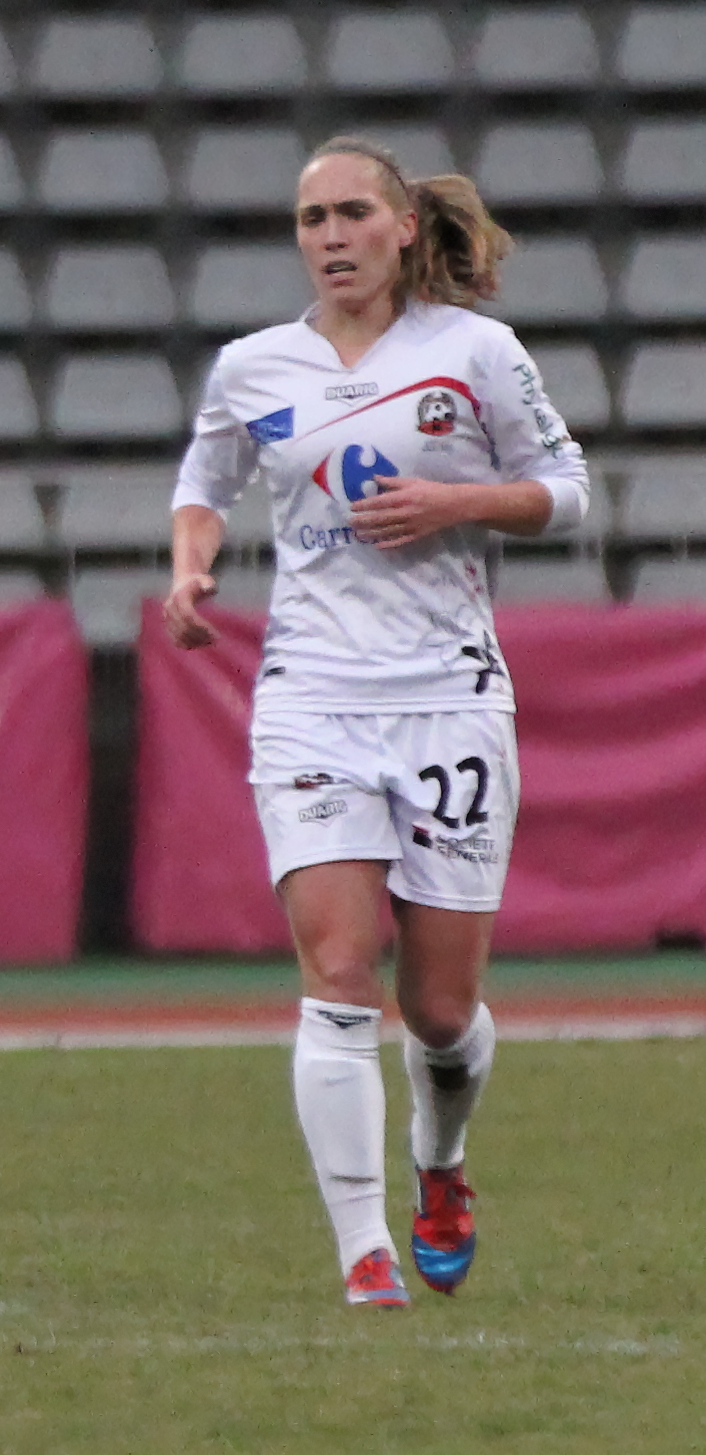
Janice Cayman

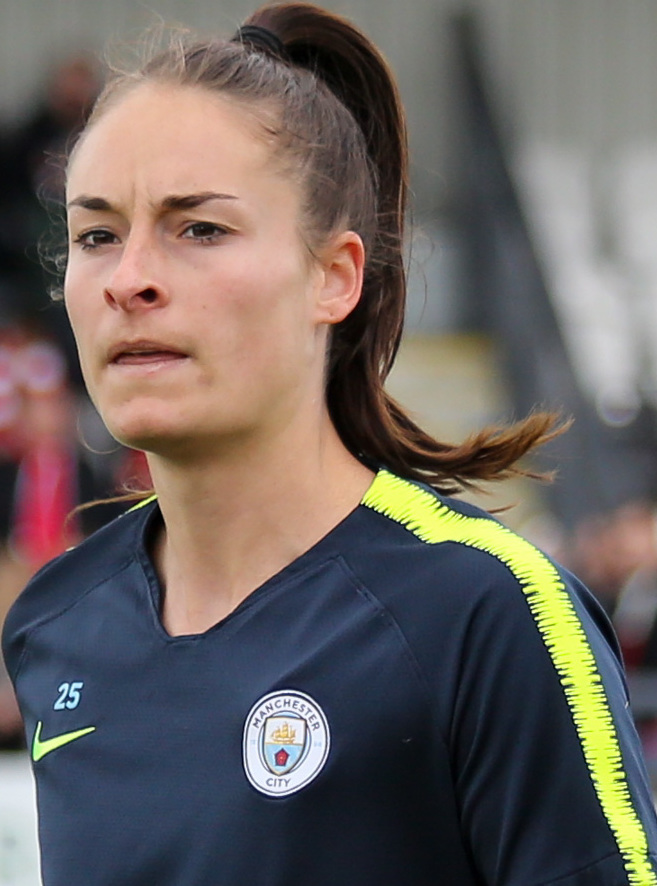
Tessa Wullaert

Rank	Player	Career	Caps	Goals
1	**Janice Cayman**	2007–present	176	49
2	**Tessa Wullaert**	2011–present	158	105
3	Davina Philtjens	2008–2025	128	10
4	**Tine De Caigny**	2014–present	113	43
5	Laura Deloose	2015–2025	112	5
6	Aline Zeler	2005–2019	111	29
7	Julie Biesmans	2011–2023	104	3
8	Heleen Jaques	2007–2020	97	3
9	Maud Coutereels	2004–2020	90	9
10	Femke Maes	1996–2009	85	25

=== Top goalscorers ===
#	Player	Career	Goals	Caps	Avg.
1	**Tessa Wullaert**	2011–present	105	158	0.66
2	**Janice Cayman**	2007–present	49	176	0.28
3	**Tine De Caigny**	2014–present	43	113	0.38
4	Aline Zeler	2009–2019	29	111	0.26
5	Femke Maes	1996–2009	25	85	0.29
6	Kristel Verelst	1998–2009	18	46	0.39
7	Myriam Vanslembrouck	1992–1996	16	21	0.76
7	**Ella Van Kerkhoven**	2013–present	16	35	0.46
9	Christine Saelens	1993–2003	13	41	0.32
10	Cecile Carnol	1996–2003	12	37	0.32

== Competitive record ==
Belgium has not yet featured at the World Cup, but has reached the end stage of the Euro 2017 tournament. Their best qualification rounds before that were for 2003 World Cup, 2013 Euro and 2015 World Cup.

=== FIFA Women's World Cup ===
FIFA Women's World Cup record									Qualification record					
Year	Round	Position	Pld	W	D*	L	GF	GA	Pld	W	D	L	GF	GA
(China) 1991	Did not qualify								6	1	0	5	1	12
(Sweden) 1995	Did not qualify								6	2	1	3	15	13
(United States) 1999	Did not qualify								8	0	1	7	6	23
(United States) 2003	Did not qualify								6	5	0	1	13	9
(China) 2007	Did not qualify								8	0	0	8	8	25
(Germany) 2011	Did not qualify								8	3	1	4	18	13
(Canada) 2015	Did not qualify								10	6	1	3	34	11
(France) 2019	Did not qualify								8	4	2	1	11	8
(Australia) (New Zealand) 2023	Did not qualify								11	7	1	2	56	7
(Brazil) 2027	Did not qualify								8	5	2	1	25	4
(Costa Rica) (Jamaica) (Mexico) (United States) 2031	To be determined								To Be Determined					
(United Kingdom) 2035	To be determined								To Be Determined					
Total	–	–	–	–	–	–	–	–	79	33	9	35	187	125
* Draws include knockout matches decided on penalty kicks.

=== UEFA Women's Championship ===
UEFA Women's Championship record									Qualification record							
Year	Round	Position	Pld	W	D*	L	GF	GA	Pld	W	D	L	GF	GA	P/R	Rnk
(Denmark) (England) (Italy) (Sweden) 1984	Did not qualify								6	1	3	2	7	12	–	
(Norway) 1987	Did not qualify								6	1	0	5	6	17	–	
(West Germany) 1989	Did not qualify								8	2	4	2	7	4	–	
(Denmark) 1991	Did not qualify								6	1	0	5	1	12	–	
(Italy) 1993	Did not qualify								4	1	2	1	1	8	–	
(England) (Germany) (Norway) (Sweden) 1995	Did not qualify								6	2	1	3	15	13	–	
(Norway) (Sweden) 1997	Did not qualify								Unable to qualify							
(Germany) 2001	Did not qualify								Unable to qualify							
(England) 2005	Did not qualify								8	1	0	7	5	39	–	
(Finland) 2009	Did not qualify								8	3	1	4	7	15	–	
(Sweden) 2013	Did not qualify								10	6	2	2	18	8	–	
(Netherlands) 2017	Group stage	10th	3	1	0	2	3	3	8	5	2	1	27	5	–	
(England) 2022	Quarter-finals	8th	4	1	1	2	3	4	8	7	0	1	37	5	–	
(Switzerland) 2025	Group stage	11th	3	1	0	2	4	8	10	4	2	4	14	19	(Note: From Euro 2025 onwards a new qualifying format was introduced, linked to the Women's Nations League where teams are divided into leagues with promotion/relegation between the leagues at the end of each cycle.)	12th
Total	Quarter-finals	3/14	10	3	1	6	10	15	88	34	17	37	145	157	12th	
* Draws include knockout matches decided on penalty kicks.

=== UEFA Women's Nations League ===
UEFA Women's Nations League record
League phase												Finals							
Season	LG	Grp	Pos	Pld	W	D	L	GF	GA	P/R	RK	Year	Pos	Pld	W	D	L	GF	GA
2023–24	A	1	3rd	8	4	2	2	17	12	*	10th	(Europe) 2024	Did not qualify						
2025	A	3	3rd	8	3	0	5	13	21	▼*	10th	(Europe) 2025	Did not qualify						
Total				16	7	2	7	30	33	10th		Total	–	–	–	–	–	–	–

▲	Promoted at end of season
Same position	No movement at end of season
▼	Relegated at end of season
*	Participated in promotion/relegation play-offs

=== Algarve Cup ===
Belgium was invited to play at the 2016 Algarve Cup in Portugal and ended fifth out of eight teams. The teams were divided into two groups; after the group stage, placement matches were played among the equally ranked teams from both groups. Belgium ended third in Group A, and won the placement match against Russia (third place in Group B) with 5–0.

=== Cyprus Cup ===
Belgium has been invited to the Cyprus Cup four times, as of 2019. Their first appearance was in 2015. They were sorted into group C that year, with Mexico, Czech Republic and South Africa, and ended last in the group. They also lost the placement match (after penalties) against South Korea, resulting in the last place of all 12 teams. In 2017 Belgium finished third in Group A with Switzerland, North Korea and Italy, and eventually reached seventh place out of 12 after winning the placement match against Austria.

Belgium was also invited to play the tournament in 2018, in a group with Austria, Czech Republic and Spain. They ended second in the group behind eventual winner Spain, and fifth overall (out of 12) after winning the placement match against South Africa. Belgium returned to the Cyprus Cup in 2019. They were in Group C with Austria, Slovakia and Nigeria. Belgium finished in third place after defeating Austria on penalties in the third place match.

=== Pinatar Cup ===
Belgium were crowned Pinatar Cup champions in 2022. Belgium beat Russia in the final after taking the game to penalties.

== FIFA world rankings ==
As of 5 August 2022

Worst Ranking Best Ranking Worst Mover Best Mover

Belgium's FIFA world rankings
Rank	Year	GP	W	D	L	Best		Worst	
Rank	Year	GP	W	D	L	Rank	Move	Rank	Move
28	2015	10	4	3	3	27	0	28	▼1
25	2016	13	8	1	4	25	▲2	28	0
22	2017	17	8	3	6	22	▲2	23	▼1
21	2018	11	5	4	2	21	▲2	23	▼1
17	2019	14	10	3	1	17	▲1	20	▲1
17	2020	7	4	1	2	17	0	17	0
20	2021	12	6	1	5	18	0	20	▼1
19	2022	15	9	1	5	19	▲1	20	▲1

== Head-to-head record ==
The following table shows Belgium's all-time international record.

Team	Pld	W	D	L	GF	GA	GD	WPCT
Albania	4	4	0	0	20	0	+20	100.00
Armenia	2	2	0	0	26	0	+26	100.00
Australia	1	1	0	0	1	0	+1	100.00
Austria	11	7	2	2	19	8	+11	63.64
Azerbaijan	2	1	1	0	11	0	+11	50.00
Bosnia and Herzegovina	2	2	0	0	11	0	+11	100.00
Bulgaria	4	3	1	0	11	0	+11	75.00
Canada	1	0	0	1	0	1	−1	0.00
Czech Republic	4	1	1	2	5	8	−3	25.00
North Korea	4	1	1	2	5	8	−3	25.00
Denmark	12	1	1	10	7	35	−28	8.33
Netherlands	33	5	5	23	31	93	−62	15.15
Total	80	28	12	40	147	153	−6	35.00

Updated to match(es) played on 28-09-2022. Source:

== Honours ==
=== Friendly ===
- Cyprus cup
  - Third place (1): 2019
- Pinatar Cup
  - Champions (1): 2022

== See also ==
- Sport in Belgium
  - Football in Belgium
    - Women's football in Belgium
- Belgium women's national football team
  - Belgium women's national football team results
- List of Belgium women's international footballers
- Belgium women's national under-20 football team
- Belgium women's national under-17 football team
- Belgium women's national futsal team
- Belgium men's national football team
