= Pinatar Cup =

Invitational women's association football tournament

- Founded: 2020
- Region: Spain
- Teams: 4
- Current champions: Canada (1st title)
- Most championships: Belgium; Canada; Finland; Iceland; Scotland (1 title each)
- Website: Official website
- 2025 Pinatar Cup

The Pinatar Cup, by full name Pinatar Cup by IAST SPORTS, is an invitational women's association football tournament held in March in San Pedro del Pinatar, Region of Murcia, Spain. In the first edition (in 2020), it was contested by Iceland, Northern Ireland, Scotland and Ukraine. The tournament is organized by the company called IAST SPORTS originally from Slovakia.

Scotland won the inaugural contest (2020) after defeating Northern Ireland in the last game with goals from Abbi Grant and Erin Cuthbert.

It is played in late February or early March, at the same time as the Algarve Cup, the Arnold Clark Cup, the Cup of Nations, the Cyprus Women's Cup, the Istria Cup, the SheBelieves Cup, the Tournoi de France, the Turkish Women's Cup and the Women's Revelations Cup.

== Results ==
Years
Years	Winners	Runners-up	Third	Fourth
2020	Scotland	Iceland	Ukraine	Northern Ireland
2022	Belgium	Russia	Republic of Ireland	Wales
2023	Iceland	Wales	Scotland	Philippines
2024	Finland	Scotland	Slovenia	Philippines
2025	Canada	Mexico	China	Chinese Taipei

== Participating teams ==
Team	2020	2022	2023	2024	2025	Years
Belgium	–	1st	–	–	–	1
Canada	–	–	–	–	1st	1
China	–	–	–	–	3rd	1
Chinese Taipei	–	–	–	–	4th	1
Finland	–	–	–	1st	–	1
Hungary	–	6th	–	–	–	1
Iceland	2nd	–	1st	–	–	2
Mexico	–	–	–	–	2nd	1
Northern Ireland	4th	–	–	–	–	1
Philippines	–	–	4th	4th		2
Poland	–	8th	–	–	–	1
Republic of Ireland	–	3rd	–	–	–	1
Russia	–	2nd	–	–	–	1
Scotland	1st	5th	3rd	2nd	–	4
Slovakia	–	7th	–	–	–	1
Slovenia	–	–	–	3rd	–	1
Ukraine	3rd	–	–	–	–	1
Wales	–	4th	2nd	–	–	2
Total	4	8	4	4	4	
