= San Pedro del Pinatar =

- Municipality
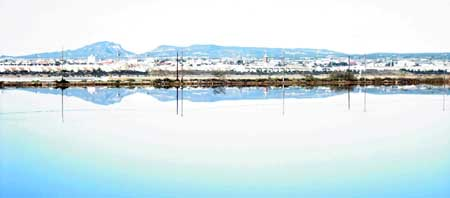
- Town's view from the salt ponds

- Flag Coat of arms

- Location in Murcia

- Location in Murcia San Pedro del Pinatar (Spain)
- Coordinates: 37°49′N 0°45′W
- Country: Spain
- Autonomous community: Murcia
- Province: Murcia
- Comarca: Mar Menor
- Judicial district: San Javier

Government
  - Alcalde: Visitación Martínez Martínez (2011) (PP)

Area
  - Total: 22.32 km^{2} (8.62 sq mi)
- Elevation: 13 m (43 ft)

Population (2025-01-01)
  - Total: 29,674
  - Density: 1,329/km^{2} (3,443/sq mi)
- Demonym: Pinatarense
- Time zone: UTC+1 (CET)
  - Summer (DST): UTC+2 (CEST)
- Postal code: 30740
- Official language(s): Español
- Website: ayto.sanpedrodelpinatar.es

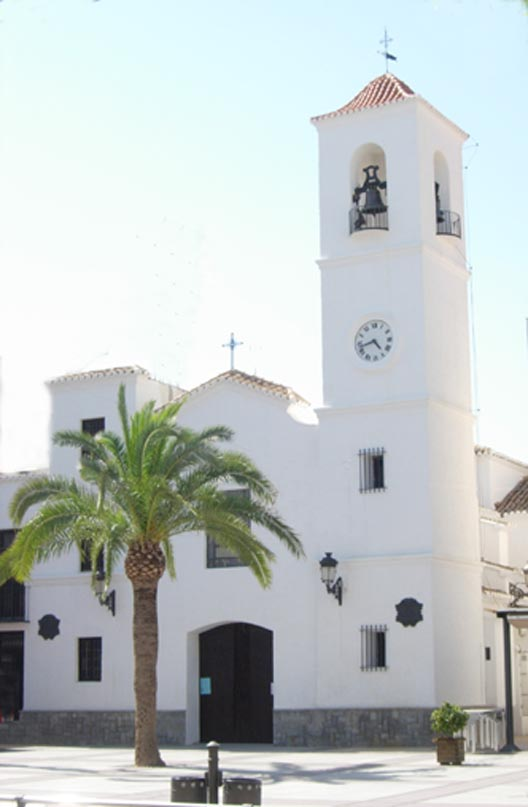
Saint Peter's church.

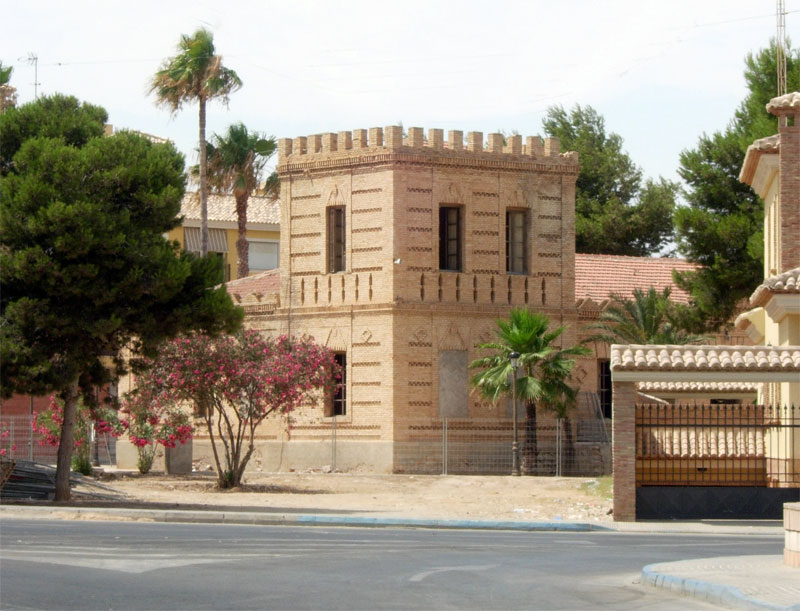
Count Villar de Felices' palace.

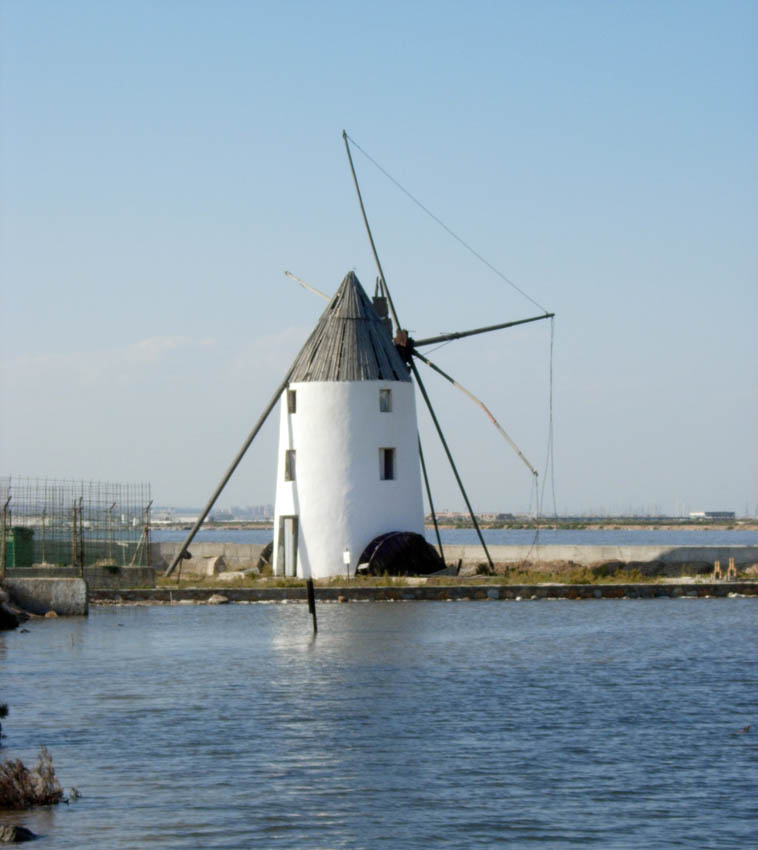
Ezequiela's windmill.

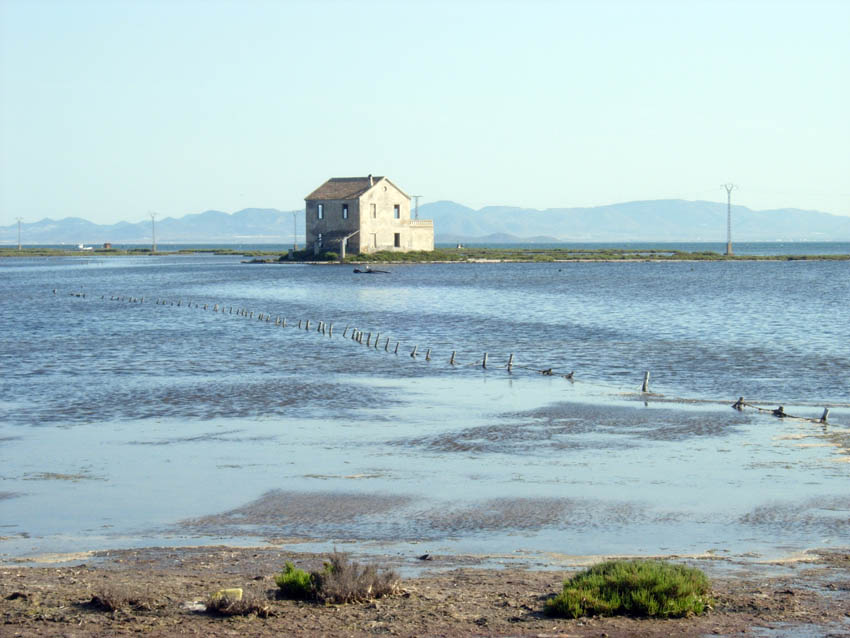
Partial view from natural park of Salinas y Arenales.

San Pedro del Pinatar is a small town and municipality in the Region of Murcia, southeastern Spain. The municipality is situated at the northern end of Murcia's Mediterranean coastline, the Costa Cálida, and borders the province of Alicante. It has an area of almost 22 km^{2}, and a population of 25,167 as of 2018.

== History ==
=== Ancient history ===
San Pedro was an industrial territory whose salt mines were used by the Romans. They utilised the salt to produce an ancient Roman sauce called garum.

=== Middle Ages ===
In 711 CE, Muslim civilizations started conquering the Iberian Peninsula. A few years later they dominated a great part of it, including the current San Pedro del Pinatar. During their occupation, they built fishing structures for a specific type of fishing which are known in Spanish as encañizadas.

In 1243, the king Muhammad Ibn Hud offered vassalage to the Crown of Castile. In April of that year, the Treaty of Alcaraz, in which the sovereignty of Castile was recognised, was signed. As a result, the former Taifa of Murcia went under Castilian rule.

The jurisdiction of the concejo (an administrative division of that era approximately equivalent to the municipality) occupies the territory. Pedro del Pinatar was part of the Crown of Castile but was on the border to the Crown of Aragon. The border, which crossed Campo de Cartagena (a region that is categorised as a comarca), was decided in 1305. The El Libro de montería de Alfonso XI, a book written in 1340, describes the municipality in the Late Middle Ages, describing the surrounding territory as a dense forest mass where wild boar were hunted. During this time, the town's population increased due to the arrival of many families.

=== Modern history ===
The localities of the municipality were set up at the beginning of the early modern period. The salt mines were utilised by the lessees who held rights on the mines at a similar level to the Crown. The institution awarded shares to these lessees in order to regain the power on the mines. The convenient access to the coastal salty lagoon of Mar Menor allowed Berber pirates to easily disembark, destroy the region and take the loot. In a letter dated to the 6 June 1592, Philip II of Spain wrote a letter in which he announced his intention to set up a tower as part of a defence system for the region. The tower was built in 1602, and it was armed with artillery and manned until the 18th century.

From War of the Spanish Succession (1700 to 1713), the people in the Reino of Murcia (an administrative division belonging to the Crown of Castile whose status was similar to an ordinary kingdom) allied with Philip V of Spain. The supporters of the Charles VI, Holy Roman Emperor, attacked Cartagena, its port and the region related to Mar Menor in 1706.

During the last years of the early modern period, there were fewer privateer attacks; as a result, there was an economic rise and an increase in population. The municipal registers, in regards to population, stated that the number of inhabitants doubled in the last years of the 18th century (1771–1798).

The town was affected by the earthquake of 1829 but not by the cholera epidemic that struck the region in the 19th century.

During the Trienio Liberal (1820–1823) and taking advantage of the just-arrived liberalism, the people formed a local government, but after 1823, when the political system corresponding to the previous politic regime was instituted, the local government was eliminated and the territory became part of the municipality of Murcia again. After the death of Ferdinand VII of Spain, liberalism was reestablished and San Pedro achieved its own local government again on 16 September 1836.

Coastal customs were set in San Pedro del Pinatar in 1857. In 1869, a law which eliminated the monopoly of the salty mines was presented. The inhabitants of the municipality relied on fishing and agriculture for their economy. Land-related activity was hindered because of a lack of lands and drought. There were attempts to attenuate these obstacles that consisted of lifting the water by waterwheels and water mills. The salt mines were among the main economic sources. Some of them were built to decant the water from Mar Menor, and a few are preserved today.

=== Present ===
In the 1960s tourism to the municipality increased and led to a rise in economy, and the appearance of construction and service-related jobs. There was an increase in population resulting from the improve of standard of living; in 1971 there were 6,637 people living in San Pedro, and 20 years after the town's population consisted of 13,000 inhabitants.

== Demography and administrative divisions ==
The 24,093 inhabitants of San Pedro del Pinatar are distributed in the following districts:

- San Pedro del Pinatar: 10,491
- Lo Pagán: 2,907
- Los Peñascos: 1,594
- Los Sáez: 1,499
- Las Esperanzas: 1,454
- Los Antolinos: 1,238
- Loma de Abajo: 786
- Los Tárragas: 750
- Los Imbernones: 329
- El Mojón: 236
- Los Veras: 211
- Loma de Arriba: 192
- Las Beatas: 104
- Los Gómez: 79
- Las Pachecas: 37
- Las Salinas: 5

== Culture ==
Every year on July 16 a naval procession in honour of the Virgin of Carmel takes place in which her image is taken upon boats, boats are blessed and those that died at sea commemorated. This tradition goes back to the 18th century.

== See also ==
- List of municipalities in the Region of Murcia

== Others links ==
- (in Spanish) Salinas y Arenales de San Pedro del Pinatar
