= 2025 UEFA Women's Nations League final =

Women's international football final between Germany and Spain

- Event: 2025 UEFA Women's Nations League
Germany	Spain
0	3
- on aggregate

First leg
Germany	Spain
0	0
- Date: 28 November 2025
- Venue: Fritz-Walter-Stadion, Kaiserslautern
- Referee: Iuliana Demetrescu (Romania)
- Attendance: 40,159

Second leg
Spain	Germany
3	0
- Date: 2 December 2025
- Venue: Metropolitano Stadium, Madrid
- Referee: Silvia Gasperotti (Italy)
- Attendance: 55,843

The 2025 UEFA Women's Nations League final was a two-legged football tie that determined the winners of the 2025 UEFA Women's Nations League, the second edition of the international football competition involving the women's national teams of the member associations of UEFA. The final was contested by Germany and Spain on 28 November and 2 December 2025.

The first leg was held at the Fritz-Walter-Stadion in Kaiserslautern, Germany, on 28 November 2025, and ended in a goalless draw. The second leg took place at the Metropolitano Stadium in Madrid, Spain, on 2 December 2025.

Spain won the second leg 3–0, with two goals from Clàudia Pina and one from Vicky López, securing a 3–0 aggregate victory and their second consecutive UEFA Women's Nations League title.

== Background ==
The 2025 UEFA Women's Nations League was the second edition of the competition, following the inaugural 2023–24 UEFA Women's Nations League. Spain entered the competition as defending champions, having defeated France 2–0 in the 2024 UEFA Women's Nations League final.

Unlike the inaugural final, which was played as a single match, the 2025 final was contested over two legs, with each finalist hosting one match.

== Route to the final ==
Germany and Spain qualified for the final through the league phase and semi-finals of the 2025 UEFA Women's Nations League A.

== Matches ==
=== First leg ===
The first leg was played on 28 November 2025 at the Fritz-Walter-Stadion in Kaiserslautern, Germany. The match ended in a 0–0 draw in front of 40,159 spectators, leaving the tie level ahead of the return leg in Madrid.

==== Details ====
28 November 2025
20:30 CET (UTC+1)

Germany	0–0	Spain
	Report

Fritz-Walter-Stadion, Kaiserslautern
Attendance: 40,159
Referee: Iuliana Demetrescu (Romania)

=== Second leg ===
The second leg was played on 2 December 2025 at the Metropolitano Stadium in Madrid, Spain. Following a goalless first half, Clàudia Pina opened the scoring in the 61st minute. Vicky López doubled Spain's advantage seven minutes later, before Pina scored her second goal in the 74th minute.

Spain won the match 3–0 in front of 55,843 spectators, securing a 3–0 aggregate victory and retaining the UEFA Women's Nations League title.

==== Details ====
2 December 2025
18:30 CET (UTC+1)

Spain	3–0	Germany
Pina 61', 74'; López 68'	Report

Metropolitano Stadium, Madrid
Attendance: 55,843
Referee: Silvia Gasperotti (Italy)

Spain won 3–0 on aggregate.
