= 2025 UEFA Women's Nations League A =

Tournament details
- Dates: League phase: 21 February – 3 June 2025; Promotion/relegation matches: 24–29 October 2025; Nations League Finals: 24 October – 2 December
- Teams: 16
- Relegated: Belgium; Portugal; Scotland; Switzerland; Wales

Tournament statistics
- Matches played: 48
- Goals scored: 160 (3.33 per match)
- Attendance: 461,317 (9,611 per match)
- Top scorer(s): (Belgium) Tessa Wullaert (France) Sandy Baltimore (Germany) Lea Schüller (5 goals each)
- Women's European Qualifiers Women's Nations League

League A is the top division of the 2025 UEFA Women's Nations League, the second season of the international football competition involving the women's national teams of the member associations of UEFA. League A will culminate with the Nations League Finals in October – December 2025 to determine the champions of the competition. The results were also used to determine the leagues for the European qualifying competition for the 2027 FIFA Women's World Cup.

== Format ==
League A consists of the 16 top-ranked UEFA members according to the Women's European Qualifiers overall phase rankings (based on the Women's Euro 2025 qualifying overall ranking, taking into consideration promotion/relegation at the conclusion of that competition), split into four groups of four. Each team played six matches within their group, using the home-and-away round-robin format with double matchdays in February, April, and May/June 2025. The winners of each group advanced to the Nations League Finals.

The competition also acted as the first phase of the qualifying competition for the 2027 FIFA Women's World Cup, which used an identical league structure. The four last-placed teams from each group were relegated to League B for the 2027 Women's World Cup qualifying competition. In addition, the four third-placed teams of League A advanced to the relegation play-offs against the four runners-up of League B. The winners of the home-and-away ties entered League A for the 2027 Women's World Cup qualifying competition, while the losers entered League B.

The Nations League Finals will take place in October to December 2025 and will be played in a knockout format, consisting of two-legged semi-finals, a third-place play-off over two legs, and a two-legged final. An open draw determined the pairings and the hosts of the first legs of the semi-final matches, as well as which semi-final pairings will host the first tie of the third place play-off and final matches.

== Seeding ==
Teams were allocated to League A according to the Women's European Qualifiers overall phase rankings, and were seeded into four pots of four teams based on the same ranking.

The draw for the league phase took place at the UEFA headquarters in Nyon, Switzerland on 7 November 2024 at 13:00 CET.

Pot 1
Team	Rank
Spain	1
Germany	2
France	3
Italy	4

Pot 2
Team	Rank
Iceland	5
Denmark	6
England	7
Netherlands	8

Pot 3
Team	Rank
Sweden	9
Norway	10
Austria	11
Belgium	12

Pot 4
Team	Rank
Portugal	13
Scotland	14
Switzerland	15
Wales	16

== Groups ==
Times are CET/CEST, (Note: CET (UTC+1) for times up to 29 March 2025. CEST (UTC+2) for times from 30 March 2025.) as listed by UEFA (local times, if different, are in parentheses).

=== Group 1 ===
Pos	Team	Pld	W	D	L	GF	GA	GD	Pts	Qualification or relegation	(Germany)	(Netherlands)	(Austria)	(Scotland)
1	Germany	6	5	1	0	26	4	+22	16	Qualification for Nations League Finals	—	4–0	4–1	6–1
2	Netherlands	6	3	2	1	11	10	+1	11		2–2	—	3–1	1–1
3	Austria (O)	6	2	0	4	5	16	−11	6	Qualification for relegation play-offs	0–6	1–3	—	1–0
4	Scotland (R)	6	0	1	5	3	15	−12	1	Relegation to League B	0–4	1–2	0–1	—

Source: UEFA
Rules for classification: Tiebreakers
(O) Play-off winners; (R) Relegated
21 February 2025
18:00

Austria	1–0	Scotland
Purtscheller 14'	Report

Josko Arena, Ried im Innkreis
Attendance: 1,750
Referee: Silvia Gasperotti (Italy)
21 February 2025
20:45

Netherlands	2–2	Germany
Beerensteyn 13', 66'	Report	Schüller 45+1'; Nüsken 50'

Rat Verlegh Stadion, Breda
Attendance: 11,013
Referee: Maria Caputi (Italy)

25 February 2025
18:15

Germany	4–1	Austria
Freigang 39'; Dallmann 55'; Hoffmann 70'; Endemann 82'	Report	Schasching 3'

Max-Morlock-Stadion, Nuremberg
Attendance: 14,394
Referee: Ivana Martinčić (Croatia)
25 February 2025
20:30 (19:30 UTC+0)

Scotland	1–2	Netherlands
Lawton 34'	Report	Beerensteyn 54'; Grant 64'

Hampden Park, Glasgow
Attendance: 3,183
Referee: Stéphanie Frappart (France)

4 April 2025
20:00

Netherlands	3–1	Austria
Groenen 12'; Egurrola 48'; Spitse 76' (pen.)	Report	Plattner 90+4'

Erve Asito, Almelo
Attendance: 9,039
Referee: Désirée Grundbacher (Switzerland)
4 April 2025
20:35 (19:35 UTC+1)

Scotland	0–4	Germany
	Report	Senß 2'; Howard 21' (o.g.); Zicai 57'; Schüller 59'

Tannadice Park, Dundee
Attendance: 6,172
Referee: Tess Olofsson (Sweden)

8 April 2025
18:15

Austria	1–3	Netherlands
Hickelsberger 9'	Report	Kaptein 10'; Van de Donk 57'; Miedema 69'

Stadion Schnabelholz, Altach
Attendance: 2,350
Referee: Ewa Augustyn (Poland)
8 April 2025
17:45

Germany	6–1	Scotland
Cerci 51', 56', 76'; Hoffmann 63', 65'; Freigang 67'	Report	Weir 40'

Volkswagen Arena, Wolfsburg
Attendance: 16,102
Referee: Jana Adámková (Czech Republic)

30 May 2025
20:30

Germany	4–0	Netherlands
Dallmann 9'; Schüller 25', 48'; Linder 45'	Report

Weserstadion, Bremen
Attendance: 32,398
Referee: Alina Peşu (Romania)
30 May 2025
20:35

Scotland	0–1	Austria
	Report	Hickelsberger 62'

Hampden Park, Glasgow
Attendance: 4,063
Referee: Marta Huerta de Aza (Spain)

3 June 2025
20:30

Austria	0–6	Germany
	Report	Lohmann 1', 39'; Schüller 9'; Cerci 26'; Bühl 31'; Freigang 43'

Viola Park, Vienna
Attendance: 5,150
Referee: Ivana Projkovska (North Macedonia)
3 June 2025
20:30

Netherlands	1–1	Scotland
Roord 10'	Report	McGovern 27'

Koning Willem II Stadion, Tilburg
Attendance: 8,180
Referee: Silvia Gasperotti (Italy)

=== Group 2 ===
Pos	Team	Pld	W	D	L	GF	GA	GD	Pts	Qualification or relegation	(France)	(Norway)	(Iceland)	(Switzerland)
1	France	6	6	0	0	14	2	+12	18	Qualification for Nations League Finals	—	1–0	3–2	4–0
2	Norway	6	2	2	2	4	5	−1	8		0–2	—	1–1	2–1
3	Iceland (O)	6	0	4	2	6	9	−3	4	Qualification for relegation play-offs	0–2	0–0	—	3–3
4	Switzerland (R)	6	0	2	4	4	12	−8	2	Relegation to League B	0–2	0–1	0–0	—

Source: UEFA
Rules for classification: Tiebreakers
(O) Play-off winners; (R) Relegated
21 February 2025
19:00

Switzerland	0–0	Iceland
	Report

Letzigrund, Zurich
Attendance: 7,718
Referee: Jana Adámková (Czech Republic)
21 February 2025
21:10

France	1–0	Norway
Katoto 73'	Report

Stadium de Toulouse, Toulouse
Attendance: 15,024
Referee: Cheryl Foster (Wales)

25 February 2025
18:00

Norway	2–1	Switzerland
Terland 74'; Graham Hansen 87'	Report	Schertenleib 83'

Viking Stadion, Stavanger
Attendance: 3,713
Referee: Marta Huerta de Aza (Spain)
25 February 2025
21:10

France	3–2	Iceland
Diani 23'; Katoto 28'; Baltimore 65'	Report	Vilhjálmsdóttir 37'; I. Sigurðardóttir 68'

Stade Marie-Marvingt, Le Mans
Attendance: 8,559
Referee: Alina Peşu (Romania)

4 April 2025
18:45 (16:45 UTC+0)

Iceland	0–0	Norway
	Report

Valbjarnarvöllur/Thróttarvöllur, Reykjavík
Attendance: 906
Referee: Silvia Gasperotti (Italy)
4 April 2025
20:00

Switzerland	0–2	France
	Report	Baltimore 15'; Bacha 43'

Kybunpark, St. Gallen
Attendance: 11,011
Referee: Catarina Campos (Portugal)

8 April 2025
18:45 (16:45 UTC+0)

Iceland	3–3	Switzerland
Vilhjálmsdóttir 45+4', 50', 62'	Report	Reuteler 2'; Vallotto 17'; Gunnlaugsdóttir 46' (o.g.)

Valbjarnarvöllur/Thróttarvöllur, Reykjavík
Attendance: 870
Referee: Frida Klarlund (Denmark)
8 April 2025
19:00

Norway	0–2	France
	Report	Baltimore 76'; Mateo 85'

Ullevaal Stadion, Oslo
Attendance: 7,071
Referee: Katalin Kulcsár (Hungary)

30 May 2025
21:10

France	4–0	Switzerland
Mateo 11'; De Almeida 16'; Baltimore 19'; Geyoro 56'	Report

Stade Marcel Picot, Tomblaine
Attendance: 12,359
Referee: Iuliana Demetrescu (Romania)
30 May 2025
20:00

Norway	1–1	Iceland
Viggósdóttir 83' (o.g.)	Report	Jónsdóttir 16'

Lerkendal Stadion, Trondheim
Attendance: 7,158
Referee: Olatz Rivera Olmedo (Spain)

3 June 2025
20:00 (18:00 UTC+0)

Iceland	0–2	France
	Report	Baltimore 74'; Geyoro 85'

Laugardalsvöllur, Reykjavík
Attendance: 2,132
Referee: Emanuela Rusta (Albania)
3 June 2025
20:00

Switzerland	0–1	Norway
	Report	Bøe Risa 4'

Stade de Tourbillon, Sion
Attendance: 6,888
Referee: Maria Caputi (Italy)

=== Group 3 ===
Pos	Team	Pld	W	D	L	GF	GA	GD	Pts	Qualification or relegation	(Spain)	(England)	(Belgium)	(Portugal)
1	Spain	6	5	0	1	21	8	+13	15	Qualification for Nations League Finals	—	2–1	3–2	7–1
2	England	6	3	1	2	16	6	+10	10		1–0	—	5–0	6–0
3	Belgium (R)	6	2	0	4	9	16	−7	6	Qualification for relegation play-offs	1–5	3–2	—	0–1
4	Portugal (R)	6	1	1	4	5	21	−16	4	Relegation to League B	2–4	1–1	0–3	—

Source: UEFA
Rules for classification: Tiebreakers
(R) Relegated
21 February 2025
18:45

Spain	3–2	Belgium
Pina 77'; García 90+2'; Martín-Prieto 90+6'	Report	Toloba 18'; Wullaert 72'

Estadi Ciutat de València, Valencia
Attendance: 9,369
Referee: Frida Klarlund (Denmark)
21 February 2025
20:45 (19:45 UTC+0)

Portugal	1–1	England
Kika 76'	Report	Russo 15'

Estádio Municipal de Portimão, Portimão
Attendance: 3,221
Referee: Ivana Projkovska (North Macedonia)

26 February 2025
20:15

Belgium	0–1	Portugal
	Report	Carole 50' (pen.)

Den Dreef, Leuven
Attendance: 3,836
Referee: Eleni Antoniou (Greece)
26 February 2025
21:00 (20:00 UTC+0)

England	1–0	Spain
Park 33'	Report

Wembley Stadium, London
Attendance: 46,550
Referee: Tess Olofsson (Sweden)

4 April 2025
20:45 (19:45 UTC+1)

Portugal	2–4	Spain
Amado 27'; Carole 56' (pen.)	Report	Guijarro 25'; Aleixandri 40'; Pina 43'; González 89'

Estádio Capital do Móvel, Paços de Ferreira
Attendance: 5,225
Referee: Iuliana Demetrescu (Romania)
4 April 2025
21:00 (20:00 UTC+1)

England	5–0	Belgium
Bronze 21'; Bright 45+1'; Beever-Jones 67'; Park 78'; Walsh 88'	Report

Ashton Gate, Bristol
Attendance: 23,202
Referee: Marta Huerta de Aza (Spain)

8 April 2025
19:00

Spain	7–1	Portugal
Paralluelo 2'; Bonmatí 8', 12'; Putellas 28', 51'; Caldentey 47'; González 60'	Report	Fonseca 71'

Balaídos Stadium, Vigo
Attendance: 15,526
Referee: Stéphanie Frappart (France)
8 April 2025
20:30

Belgium	3–2	England
Wullaert 4', 29'; Vanhaevermaet 16'	Report	Mead 35' (pen.); Agyemang 81'

Den Dreef, Leuven
Attendance: 6,253
Referee: Maria Caputi (Italy)

30 May 2025
20:30

Belgium	1–5	Spain
De Caigny 88'	Report	González 36', 64'; Del Castillo 78', 79'; Redondo 85'

Den Dreef, Leuven
Attendance: 8,054
Referee: Ewa Augustyn (Poland)
30 May 2025
20:45 (19:45 UTC+1)

England	6–0	Portugal
Beever-Jones 3', 26', 33'; Bronze 5'; Mead 29'; Kelly 62'	Report

Wembley Stadium, London
Attendance: 48,531
Referee: Frida Klarlund (Denmark)

3 June 2025
19:00 (18:00 UTC+1)

Portugal	0–3	Belgium
	Report	Vanhaevermaet 37'; Wullaert 67' (pen.), 72'

Estádio do Marítimo, Funchal
Attendance: 5,675
Referee: Tess Olofsson (Sweden)
3 June 2025
19:00

Spain	2–1	England
Pina 60', 70'	Report	Russo 22'

RCDE Stadium, Cornellà de Llobregat
Attendance: 14,107
Referee: Katalin Kulcsár (Hungary)

=== Group 4 ===
Pos	Team	Pld	W	D	L	GF	GA	GD	Pts	Qualification or relegation	(Sweden)	(Italy)	(Denmark)	(Wales)
1	Sweden	6	3	3	0	13	6	+7	12	Qualification for Nations League Finals	—	3–2	6–1	1–1
2	Italy	6	3	1	2	11	7	+4	10		0–0	—	1–3	1–0
3	Denmark (O)	6	3	0	3	8	13	−5	9	Qualification for relegation play-offs	1–2	0–3	—	1–0
4	Wales (R)	6	0	2	4	4	10	−6	2	Relegation to League B	1–1	1–4	1–2	—

Source: UEFA
Rules for classification: Tiebreakers
(O) Play-off winners; (R) Relegated
21 February 2025
18:15

Italy	1–0	Wales
Bonansea 5'	Report

Stadio Brianteo, Monza
Attendance: 4,219
Referee: Katalin Kulcsár (Hungary)
21 February 2025
19:15

Denmark	1–2	Sweden
Harder 17' (pen.)	Report	Sembrant 7'; Rolfö 54'

Odense Stadium, Odense
Attendance: 3,202
Referee: Riem Hussein (Germany)

25 February 2025
18:15

Italy	1–3	Denmark
Cambiaghi 58'	Report	Færge 53'; Holmgaard 74'; Thomsen 90+3'

Stadio Alberto Picco, La Spezia
Attendance: 1,671
Referee: Olatz Rivera Olmedo (Spain)
25 February 2025
20:15 (19:15 UTC+0)

Wales	1–1	Sweden
Barton 76' (pen.)	Report	Angeldahl 14'

Racecourse Ground, Wrexham
Attendance: 6,077
Referee: Désirée Grundbacher (Switzerland)

4 April 2025
19:00

Sweden	3–2	Italy
Asllani 56'; Angeldahl 75'; Rolfö 90+5' (pen.)	Report	Severini 1'; Cambiaghi 85'

Nationalarenan, Solna
Attendance: 14,521
Referee: Alina Peşu (Romania)
4 April 2025
20:15 (19:15 UTC+1)

Wales	1–2	Denmark
Holland 34'	Report	Bruun 7'; Vangsgaard 72'

Cardiff City Stadium, Cardiff
Attendance: 6,779
Referee: Michalina Diakow (Poland)

8 April 2025
18:00

Denmark	0–3	Italy
	Report	Caruso 59'; Di Guglielmo 79'; Girelli 86'

MCH Arena, Herning
Attendance: 5,166
Referee: Ivana Martinčić (Croatia)
8 April 2025
19:00

Sweden	1–1	Wales
Eriksson 59'	Report	Cain 67'

Gamla Ullevi, Gothenburg
Attendance: 8,759
Referee: Olatz Rivera Olmedo (Spain)

30 May 2025
19:15

Denmark	1–0	Wales
Harder 48'	Report

Odense Stadium, Odense
Attendance: 3,442
Referee: Catarina Campos (Portugal)
30 May 2025
18:20

Italy	0–0	Sweden
	Report

Stadio Ennio Tardini, Parma
Attendance: 2,337
Referee: Stéphanie Frappart (France)

3 June 2025
19:30

Sweden	6–1	Denmark
Blackstenius 1', 43', 53'; Rytting Kaneryd 5'; Angeldahl 11'; Hurtig 90+2'	Report	Thomsen 41'

Nationalarenan, Solna
Attendance: 12,428
Referee: Jana Adámková (Czech Republic)
3 June 2025
19:30 (18:30 UTC+1)

Wales	1–4	Italy
Fishlock 82'	Report	Linari 9'; Girelli 21', 45+5'; Cantore 41'

Swansea Stadium, Swansea City
Attendance: 5,964
Referee: Eleni Antoniou (Greece)

== League ranking ==
The 16 League A teams are ranked 1st to 16th overall in the 2025 Women's Nations League, according to the criteria for league ranking.

Rnk	Grp	Team	Pld	W	D	L	GF	GA	GD	Pts	SR
1	A2	France	6	6	0	0	14	2	+12	18	
2	A1	Germany	6	5	1	0	26	4	+22	16	
3	A3	Spain	6	5	0	1	21	8	+13	15	
4	A4	Sweden	6	3	3	0	13	6	+7	12	
5	A1	Netherlands	6	3	2	1	11	10	+1	11	
6	A3	England	6	3	1	2	16	6	+10	10	
7	A4	Italy	6	3	1	2	11	7	+4	10	
8	A2	Norway	6	2	2	2	4	5	−1	8	
9	A4	Denmark	6	3	0	3	8	13	−5	9	Relegation playoff for League B
10	A3	Belgium	6	2	0	4	9	16	−7	6	Relegation playoff for League B
11	A1	Austria	6	2	0	4	5	16	−11	6	Relegation playoff for League B
12	A2	Iceland	6	0	4	2	6	9	−3	4	Relegation playoff for League B
13	A3	Portugal	6	1	1	4	5	21	−16	4	Relegation to League B
14	A4	Wales	6	0	2	4	4	10	−6	2	Relegation to League B
15	A2	Switzerland	6	0	2	4	4	12	−8	2	Relegation to League B
16	A1	Scotland	6	0	1	5	3	15	−12	1	Relegation to League B

Source: UEFA
Rules for classification: Ranking criteria

== Nations League Finals ==
=== Bracket ===
Semi-finals
24–28 October Düsseldorf And Caen
Germany	1	2	3
France	0	2	2
24–28 October Malaga And Gothenburg
Sweden	0	0	0
Spain	4	1	5

Final
28 November – 2 December Kaiserslautern And Madrid
Germany	0	0	0
Spain	0	3	3
Third place play-off
28 November – 2 December Reims And Solna
France	2	2	4
Sweden	1	2	3

=== Semi-finals ===
24 October 2025
17:45 CEST (UTC+2)

Germany	1–0	France
Bühl 79'	Report

Merkur Spiel-Arena, Düsseldorf
Attendance: 37,191
Referee: Ivana Projkovska (North Macedonia)
28 October 2025
21:10 CET (UTC+1)

France	2–2	Germany
Malard 3'; Mateo 89'	Report	Anyomi 12'; Bühl 50'

Stade Michel d'Ornano, Caen
Attendance: 18,112
Referee: Frida Klarlund (Denmark)

24 October 2025
20:00 CEST (UTC+2)

Spain	4–0	Sweden
Putellas 11', 35'; Pina 32', 90+4'	Report

La Rosaleda, Málaga
Attendance: 20,929
Referee: Iuliana Demetrescu (Romania)
28 October 2025
19:00 CET (UTC+1)

Sweden	0–1	Spain
	Report	Putellas 74'

Gamla Ullevi, Gothenburg
Attendance: 15,873
Referee: Ivana Martinčić (Croatia)

=== Third-place play-off ===
28 November 2025
21:10 CET (UTC+1)

France	2–1	Sweden
Karchaoui 45+3' (pen.); Mbock Bathy 90+6'	Report	Blackstenius 67'

Stade Auguste-Delaune, Reims
Attendance: 7,091
Referee: Désirée Blanco (Switzerland)
2 December 2025
19:00 CET (UTC+1)

Sweden	2–2 (a.e.t.)	France
Ijeh 84'; Kafaji 90+2'	Report	Mateo 58'; Gago 106'

Nationalarenan, Solna
Attendance: 9,141
Referee: Marta Huerta de Aza (Spain)

=== Final ===
28 November 2025
20:30 CET (UTC+1)

Germany	0–0	Spain
	Report

Fritz-Walter-Stadion, Kaiserslautern
Attendance: 40,159
Referee: Iuliana Demetrescu (Romania)
2 December 2025
18:30 CET (UTC+1)

Spain	3–0	Germany
Pina 61', 74'; López 68'	Report

Metropolitano Stadium, Madrid
Attendance: 55,843
Referee: Silvia Gasperotti (Italy)

== Goalscorers ==
There were 160 goals scored in 48 matches, for an average of 3.33 goals per match.

5 goals

- (Belgium women's national football team) Tessa Wullaert
- (France women's national football team) Sandy Baltimore
- (Germany women's national football team) Lea Schüller

4 goals

- (England women's national football team) Aggie Beever-Jones
- (Germany women's national football team) Selina Cerci
- (Iceland women's national football team) Karólína Vilhjálmsdóttir
- (Spain women's national football team) Esther González
- (Spain women's national football team) Clàudia Pina

3 goals

- (Germany women's national football team) Laura Freigang
- (Germany women's national football team) Giovanna Hoffmann
- (Italy women's national football team) Cristiana Girelli
- (Netherlands women's national football team) Lineth Beerensteyn
- (Sweden women's national football team) Filippa Angeldahl
- (Sweden women's national football team) Stina Blackstenius

2 goals

- (Austria women's national football team) Julia Hickelsberger
- (Belgium women's national football team) Justine Vanhaevermaet
- (Denmark women's national football team) Pernille Harder
- (Denmark women's national football team) Janni Thomsen
- (England women's national football team) Lucy Bronze
- (England women's national football team) Beth Mead
- (England women's national football team) Jess Park
- (England women's national football team) Alessia Russo
- (France women's national football team) Grace Geyoro
- (France women's national football team) Marie-Antoinette Katoto
- (France women's national football team) Clara Mateo
- (Germany women's national football team) Linda Dallmann
- (Germany women's national football team) Sydney Lohmann
- (Italy women's national football team) Michela Cambiaghi
- (Portugal women's national football team) Carole Costa
- (Spain women's national football team) Aitana Bonmatí
- (Spain women's national football team) Athenea del Castillo
- (Spain women's national football team) Alexia Putellas
- (Sweden women's national football team) Fridolina Rolfö

1 goal

- (Austria women's national football team) Maria Plattner
- (Austria women's national football team) Lilli Purtscheller
- (Austria women's national football team) Annabel Schasching
- (Belgium women's national football team) Tine De Caigny
- (Belgium women's national football team) Mariam Toloba
- (Denmark women's national football team) Signe Bruun
- (Denmark women's national football team) Emma Færge
- (Denmark women's national football team) Sara Holmgaard
- (Denmark women's national football team) Amalie Vangsgaard
- (England women's national football team) Michelle Agyemang
- (England women's national football team) Millie Bright
- (England women's national football team) Chloe Kelly
- (England women's national football team) Keira Walsh
- (France women's national football team) Selma Bacha
- (France women's national football team) Élisa De Almeida
- (France women's national football team) Kadidiatou Diani
- (Germany women's national football team) Klara Bühl
- (Germany women's national football team) Vivien Endemann
- (Germany women's national football team) Sarai Linder
- (Germany women's national football team) Sjoeke Nüsken
- (Germany women's national football team) Elisa Senß
- (Germany women's national football team) Cora Zicai
- (Iceland women's national football team) Sveindís Jónsdóttir
- (Iceland women's national football team) Ingibjörg Sigurðardóttir
- (Italy women's national football team) Barbara Bonansea
- (Italy women's national football team) Sofia Cantore
- (Italy women's national football team) Arianna Caruso
- (Italy women's national football team) Lucia Di Guglielmo
- (Italy women's national football team) Elena Linari
- (Italy women's national football team) Emma Severini
- (Netherlands women's national football team) Daniëlle van de Donk
- (Netherlands women's national football team) Damaris Egurrola
- (Netherlands women's national football team) Chasity Grant
- (Netherlands women's national football team) Jackie Groenen
- (Netherlands women's national football team) Wieke Kaptein
- (Netherlands women's national football team) Vivianne Miedema
- (Netherlands women's national football team) Jill Roord
- (Netherlands women's national football team) Sherida Spitse
- (Norway women's national football team) Vilde Bøe Risa
- (Norway women's national football team) Caroline Graham Hansen
- (Norway women's national football team) Elisabeth Terland
- (Portugal women's national football team) Catarina Amado
- (Portugal women's national football team) Beatriz Fonseca
- (Portugal women's national football team) Kika Nazareth
- (Scotland women's national football team) Emma Lawton
- (Scotland women's national football team) Kathleen McGovern
- (Scotland women's national football team) Caroline Weir
- (Spain women's national football team) Laia Aleixandri
- (Spain women's national football team) Mariona Caldentey
- (Spain women's national football team) Lucía García
- (Spain women's national football team) Patricia Guijarro
- (Spain women's national football team) Cristina Martín-Prieto
- (Spain women's national football team) Salma Paralluelo
- (Spain women's national football team) Alba Redondo
- (Sweden women's national football team) Kosovare Asllani
- (Sweden women's national football team) Magdalena Eriksson
- (Sweden women's national football team) Lina Hurtig
- (Sweden women's national football team) Johanna Rytting Kaneryd
- (Sweden women's national football team) Linda Sembrant
- (Switzerland women's national football team) Géraldine Reuteler
- (Switzerland women's national football team) Sydney Schertenleib
- (Switzerland women's national football team) Smilla Vallotto
- (Wales women's national football team) Kayleigh Barton
- (Wales women's national football team) Hannah Cain
- (Wales women's national football team) Jess Fishlock
- (Wales women's national football team) Ceri Holland

1 own goal

- (Iceland women's national football team) Áslaug Gunnlaugsdóttir (against Switzerland)
- (Iceland women's national football team) Glódís Viggósdóttir (against Norway)
- (Scotland women's national football team) Sophie Howard (against Germany)
