= 2025 UEFA Women's Nations League Finals =

Tournament details
- Host countries: France; Germany; Spain; Sweden
- Dates: 24 October – 2 December
- Teams: 4
- Venues: 8 (in 8 host cities)

Final positions
- Champions: Spain (2nd title)
- Runners-up: Germany
- Third place: France
- Fourth place: Sweden

Tournament statistics
- Matches played: 8
- Goals scored: 20 (2.5 per match)
- Attendance: 204,339 (25,542 per match)
- Top scorer(s): (Spain) Clàudia Pina (4 goals)

The 2025 UEFA Women's Nations League Finals was the final tournament of the 2025 edition of the UEFA Women's Nations League, the second season of the international football competition involving the women's national teams of the 55 member associations of UEFA. The tournament consisted of two semi-finals, a third place play-off, and a final, all played over two legs, to determine the champions of the UEFA Women's Nations League.

== Format ==
The Nations League Finals was held from October to December 2025 and were contested by the four group winners of League A.

The competition was played in a two-legged knockout format, consisting of two semi-finals, a third place play-off, and a final, all played over two legs (this differs to the previous edition and all other men's editions where all the Nations Leagues Finals matches were single-legged). An open draw took place on 6 June 2025 to determine the pairings and order of legs for the semi-final matches, as well as which semi-final pairing had its teams host the first leg of the third-place play-off and final.

The semi-final matches took place on 24 and 28 October, and the third place play-off and final matches took place on 28 November and 2 December.

The Nations League Finals were played in two-legged knockout matches, with the aggregate score over two legs determining the winner. If the aggregate score was level at the end of normal time in the second leg, 30 minutes of extra time would be played without the away goals rule, and if still level after extra time a penalty shoot-out would decide the winning team.

== Qualified teams ==
The four group winners of League A qualified for the Nations League Finals.

Group	Winners	Date of qualification	UNL ranking June 2025	FIFA ranking August 2025
A1	Germany	30 May 2025	2	5
A2	France	8 April 2025	1	6
A3	Spain	3 June 2025	3	1
A4	Sweden	3 June 2025	4	3

== Venues ==
France		Germany	
Caen	Reims	Düsseldorf	Kaiserslautern
Stade Michel d'Ornano	Stade Auguste-Delaune	Merkur Spiel-Arena	Fritz-Walter-Stadion
Capacity: 20,300	Capacity: 21,029	Capacity: 54,600	Capacity: 47,103
2025 UEFA Women's Nations League Finals venues
Spain		Sweden	
Málaga	Madrid	Gothenburg	Solna
Estadio La Rosaleda	Metropolitano Stadium	Gamla Ullevi	Nationalarenan
Capacity: 30,044	Capacity: 70,692	Capacity: 18,454	Capacity: 35,000

== Bracket ==
Semi-finals
24–28 October Düsseldorf And Caen
Germany	1	2	3
France	0	2	2
24–28 October Malaga And Gothenburg
Sweden	0	0	0
Spain	4	1	5

Final
28 November – 2 December Kaiserslautern And Madrid
Germany	0	0	0
Spain	0	3	3
Third place play-off
28 November – 2 December Reims And Solna
France	2	2	4
Sweden	1	2	3

== Semi-finals ==
24 October 2025
17:45 CEST (UTC+2)

Germany	1–0	France
Bühl 79'	Report

Merkur Spiel-Arena, Düsseldorf
Attendance: 37,191
Referee: Ivana Projkovska (North Macedonia)
28 October 2025
21:10 CET (UTC+1)

France	2–2	Germany
Malard 3'; Mateo 89'	Report	Anyomi 12'; Bühl 50'

Stade Michel d'Ornano, Caen
Attendance: 18,112
Referee: Frida Klarlund (Denmark)

Germany won 3–2 on aggregate and advanced to the final. France advanced to the third place play-off.

24 October 2025
20:00 CEST (UTC+2)

Spain	4–0	Sweden
Putellas 11', 35'; Pina 32', 90+4'	Report

La Rosaleda, Málaga
Attendance: 20,929
Referee: Iuliana Demetrescu (Romania)
28 October 2025
19:00 CET (UTC+1)

Sweden	0–1	Spain
	Report	Putellas 74'

Gamla Ullevi, Gothenburg
Attendance: 15,873
Referee: Ivana Martinčić (Croatia)

Spain won 5–0 on aggregate and advanced to the final. Sweden advanced to the third place play-off.

== Third place play-off ==
28 November 2025
21:10 CET (UTC+1)

France	2–1	Sweden
Karchaoui 45+3' (pen.); Mbock Bathy 90+6'	Report	Blackstenius 67'

Stade Auguste-Delaune, Reims
Attendance: 7,091
Referee: Désirée Blanco (Switzerland)
2 December 2025
19:00 CET (UTC+1)

Sweden	2–2 (a.e.t.)	France
Ijeh 84'; Kafaji 90+2'	Report	Mateo 58'; Gago 106'

Nationalarenan, Solna
Attendance: 9,141
Referee: Marta Huerta de Aza (Spain)

France won 4–3 on aggregate.

== Final ==
28 November 2025
20:30 CET (UTC+1)

Germany	0–0	Spain
	Report

Fritz-Walter-Stadion, Kaiserslautern
Attendance: 40,159
Referee: Iuliana Demetrescu (Romania)
2 December 2025
18:30 CET (UTC+1)

Spain	3–0	Germany
Pina 61', 74'; López 68'	Report

Metropolitano Stadium, Madrid
Attendance: 55,843
Referee: Silvia Gasperotti (Italy)

Spain won 3–0 on aggregate.

== Goalscorers ==
There were 20 goals scored in 4 matches, for an average of 5 goals per match.

4 goals

- (Spain women's national football team) Clàudia Pina

3 goals

- (Spain women's national football team) Alexia Putellas

2 goals

- (France women's national football team) Clara Mateo
- (Germany women's national football team) Klara Bühl

1 goal

- (France women's national football team) Kelly Gago
- (France women's national football team) Sakina Karchaoui
- (France women's national football team) Melvine Malard
- (France women's national football team) Griedge Mbock Bathy
- (Germany women's national football team) Nicole Anyomi
- (Spain women's national football team) Vicky López
- (Sweden women's national football team) Stina Blackstenius
- (Sweden women's national football team) Evelyn Ijeh
- (Sweden women's national football team) Rosa Kafaji
