= 2025 UEFA Women's Nations League promotion/relegation matches =

Tournament details
- Dates: 24–29 October 2025
- Teams: 12

Tournament statistics
- Matches played: 12
- Goals scored: 41 (3.42 per match)
- Attendance: 56,473 (4,706 per match)
- Top scorer(s): (Albania) Megi Doçi (Belgium) Tessa Wullaert (Denmark) Pernille Harder (Turkey) Kader Hançar (3 goals each)

The 2025 UEFA Women's Nations League promotion/relegation matches were the promotion and relegation play-offs of the 2025 edition of the UEFA Women's Nations League, the second season of the international football competition involving the women's national teams of the member associations of UEFA. The play-offs determined which teams were promoted, relegated, or remained in their respective leagues for the 2027 FIFA Women's World Cup qualifying competition.

== Format ==
The promotion/relegation matches determined the final composition of the leagues for 2027 FIFA Women's World Cup qualification, which used an identical league structure to the 2025 UEFA Women's Nations League. The matches were played home-and-away over two legs. If the team from the higher league was the winner, both teams remained in their respective leagues, whereas if the team from the lower league won, they were promoted to the higher league, with the losers relegated to the lower league.

The four third-placed teams of League A played the four runners-up of League B, while the two best-ranked third-placed teams in League B played the two best-ranked League C runners-up. The teams from the higher leagues were seeded, and played the second leg at home. In the two-legged ties, the team that scored more goals on aggregate was the winner. If the aggregate score was level, extra time would be played (the away goals rule did not apply). If the score remained level after extra time, a penalty shoot-out would be used to decide the winner.

== Draw ==
The draw for the promotion/relegation matches were held on 6 June 2025 in Nyon, Switzerland. They were held in tandem with the draw for the 2025 UEFA Women's Nations League Finals. In the draws, the teams from the higher leagues were seeded, while the teams from the lower leagues were unseeded. Seeded teams played the second leg of their ties at home. First a team was drawn from the unseeded pot, with their opponents then drawn from the seeded pot.

League A vs League B

League A (seeded)
Group	Third place
A1	Austria
A2	Iceland
A3	Belgium
A4	Denmark

League B (unseeded)
Group	Runners-up
B1	Northern Ireland
B2	Republic of Ireland
B3	Finland
B4	Czech Republic

League B vs League C

League B (seeded)
Group	Third place (best two qualify)
B1	—
B2	Turkey
B3	—
B4	Albania

League C (unseeded)
Group	Runners-up (best two qualify)
C1	—
C2	Cyprus
C3	—
C4	—
C5	—
C6	Kosovo

== Schedule ==
Both legs of each tie were played between 24 and 29 October.

Times are CEST (UTC+2)/CET (UTC+1) as listed by UEFA (local times, if different, are in parentheses).

== League A vs League B ==
=== Summary ===
Team 1	Agg.	Team 2	1st leg	2nd leg
Northern Ireland	0–5	Iceland	0–2	0–3
Finland	1–8	Denmark	1–6	0–2
Republic of Ireland	5–4	Belgium	4–2	1–2
Czech Republic	1–2	Austria	1–0	0–2

=== Matches ===
24 October 2025
20:00 (19:00 BST)

Northern Ireland	0–2	Iceland
	Report	Viggósdóttir 31'; I. Sigurðardóttir 75'

The Showgrounds, Ballymena
Attendance: 2,184
Referee: Eleni Antoniou (Greece)
29 October 2025 (Note: Originally scheduled to be played 28 October at Laugardalsvöllur, the match was postponed and relocated due to heavy snowfall.)
18:00 (17:00 WET)

Iceland	3–0	Northern Ireland
Jónsdóttir 32'; H. Eiríksdóttir 58'; Ásgeirsdóttir 73' (pen.)	Report

Valbjarnarvöllur, Reykjavík
Attendance: 421
Referee: Katalin Kulcsár (Hungary)

Iceland won 5–0 on aggregate, and therefore both teams remained in their respective leagues.

24 October 2025
18:00 (19:00 EEST)

Finland	1–6	Denmark
Lindström 90'	Report	Snerle 10'; Svava 39'; Harder 45+2', 68'; S. Holmgaard 87', 90+4'

Tammelan Stadion, Tampere
Attendance: 6,474
Referee: Désirée Grundbacher (Switzerland)
28 October 2025
18:00

Denmark	2–0	Finland
Møller Kühl 73'; Harder 85' (pen.)	Report

Parken, Copenhagen
Attendance: 14,475
Referee: Marta Huerta de Aza (Spain)

Denmark won 8–1 on aggregate, and therefore both teams remained in their respective leagues.

24 October 2025
20:00 (19:00 IST)

Republic of Ireland	4–2	Belgium
McCabe 45' (pen.), 62'; Evrard 54' (o.g.); Sheva 66'	Report	Wullaert 52'; Detruyer 82'

Aviva Stadium, Dublin
Attendance: 14,180
Referee: Franziska Wildfeuer (Germany)
28 October 2025
20:30

Belgium	2–1	Republic of Ireland
Wullaert 33', 39'	Report	Larkin 90'

Den Dreef, Leuven
Attendance: 7,700
Referee: Stéphanie Frappart (France)

Republic of Ireland won 5–4 on aggregate and were promoted to League A, while Belgium were relegated to League B.

24 October 2025
17:30

Czech Republic	1–0	Austria
Khýrová 42'	Report

Městský fotbalový stadion Miroslava Valenty, Uherské Hradiště
Attendance: 1,710
Referee: Emanuela Rusta (Albania)
28 October 2025
18:00

Austria	2–0	Czech Republic
Puntigam 34' (pen.); Klein 89'	Report

Franz Horr Stadium, Vienna
Attendance: 2,100
Referee: Lina Lehtovaara (Finland)

Austria won 2–1 on aggregate, and therefore both teams remained in their respective leagues.

== League B vs League C ==
=== Summary ===
Team 1	Agg.	Team 2	1st leg	2nd leg
Cyprus	3–5	Albania	3–2	0–3
Kosovo	0–7	Turkey	0–4	0–3

=== Matches ===
24 October 2025
18:00 (19:00 EEST)

Cyprus	3–2	Albania
Panagiotou 43'; Violari 45+1', 83'	Report	Doçi 29', 33'

Antonis Papadopoulos Stadium, Larnaca
Attendance: 350
Referee: Miriama Bočková (Slovakia)
28 October 2025
18:00

Albania	3–0	Cyprus
Krasniqi 16'; Begallo 38'; Doçi 67' (pen.)	Report

Arena Kombëtare, Tirana
Attendance: 678
Referee: Catarina Campos (Portugal)

Albania won 5–3 on aggregate, and therefore both teams remained in their respective leagues.

24 October 2025
17:00

Kosovo	0–4	Turkey
	Report	Hançar 5', 10'; Pekel 23'; Şeker 81'

Fadil Vokrri Stadium, Pristina
Attendance: 300
Referee: Michaela Pachtova (Czech Republic)
28 October 2025
18:00 (20:00 TRT)

Turkey	3–0	Kosovo
Pekel 22'; Hançar 29' (pen.); Şeker 78'	Report

Gürsel Aksel Stadium, İzmir
Attendance: 5,901
Referee: Michalina Diakow (Poland)

Turkey won 7–0 on aggregate, and therefore both teams remained in their respective leagues.

== Goalscorers ==
There were 41 goals scored in 12 matches, for an average of 3.42 goals per match.

3 goals

- (Albania) Megi Doçi
- (Belgium) Tessa Wullaert
- (Denmark) Pernille Harder
- (Turkey) Kader Hançar

2 goals

- (Cyprus) Antri Violari
- (Denmark) Sara Holmgaard
- (Republic of Ireland) Katie McCabe
- (Turkey) Melike Pekel
- (Turkey) Busem Şeker

1 goal

- (Albania) Sara Begallo
- (Albania) Qendresa Krasniqi
- (Austria) Jennifer Klein
- (Austria) Sarah Puntigam
- (Belgium) Marie Detruyer
- (Cyprus) Maria Panagiotou
- (Czech Republic) Michaela Khýrová
- (Denmark) Kathrine Møller Kühl
- (Denmark) Emma Snerle
- (Denmark) Sofie Svava
- (Finland) Lotta Lindström
- (Iceland) Emilía Ásgeirsdóttir
- (Iceland) Hlín Eiríksdóttir
- (Iceland) Sveindís Jónsdóttir
- (Iceland) Ingibjörg Sigurðardóttir
- (Iceland) Glódís Viggósdóttir
- (Republic of Ireland) Abbie Larkin
- (Republic of Ireland) Marissa Sheva

1 own goal

- (Belgium) Nicky Evrard (against Republic of Ireland)
