= Clara Mateo =

French footballer (born 1997)

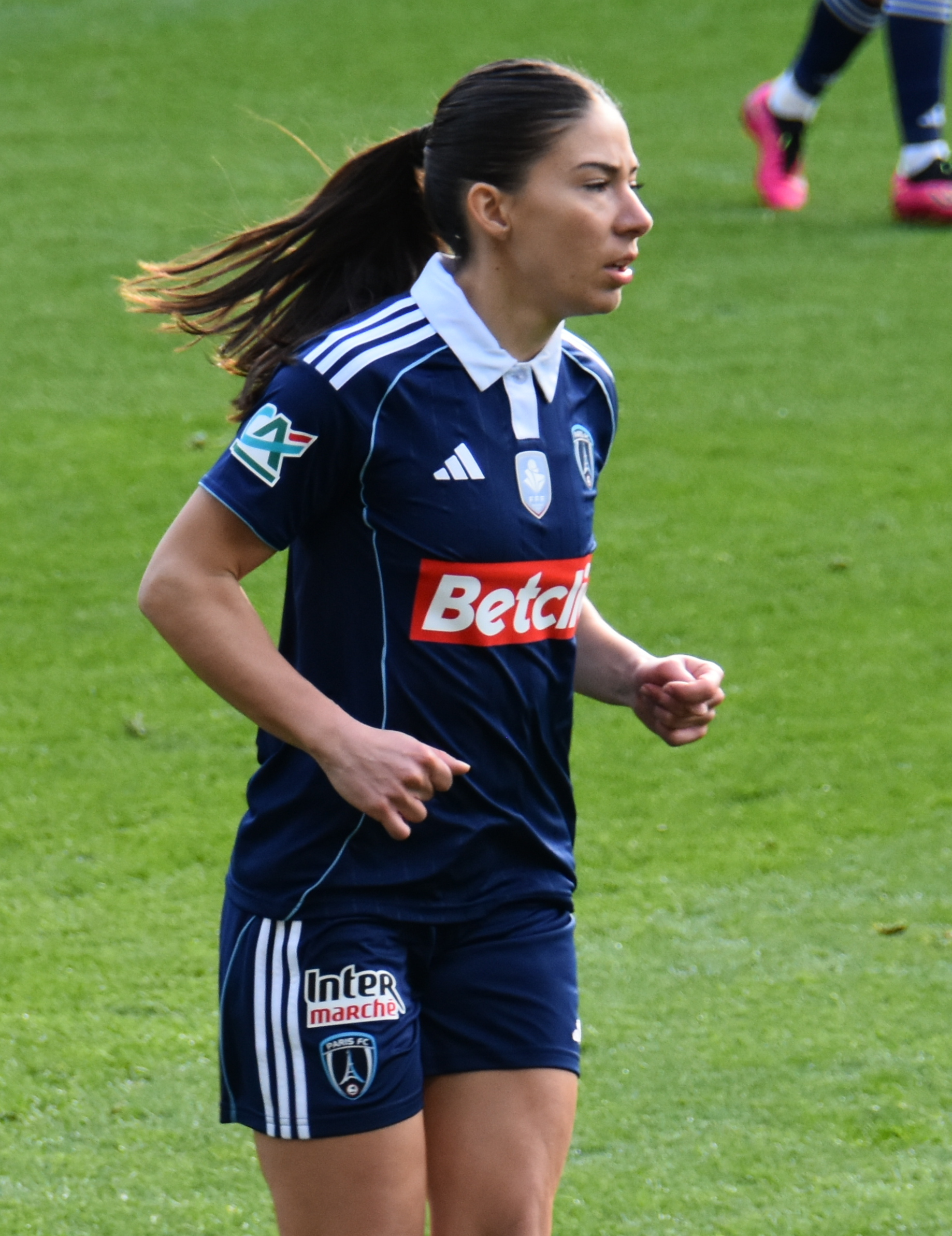
- Mateo with Paris FC in 2026

Personal information
- Full name: Clara Coline Mona Mateo
- Date of birth: 28 November 1997 (age 28)
- Place of birth: Nantes, France
- Height: 1.68 m (5 ft 6 in)
- Positions: Forward; attacking midfielder

Team information
- Current team: Paris FC
- Number: 10

Youth career
- 2004–2012: US Sainte-Luce-sur-Loire
- 2012–2014: Vendée La Roche

Senior career*
Years	Team	Apps	(Gls)
2014–2016	Vendée La Roche	43	(12)
2016–	Paris FC (Note: Known as FCF Juvisy during the 2016–17 season.)	212	(88)

International career^{‡}
2013	France U16	2	(0)
2013	France U17	8	(0)
2015–2016	France U19	22	(10)
2016	France U20	8	(3)
2017–2019	France U23	16	(9)
2020–	France	50	(11)
Medal record
Women's association football
Representing France
UEFA Women's Nations League
Runner-up	2024
Third place	2025
FIFA U-20 Women's World Cup
Runner-up	2016 Papua New Guinea
UEFA Women's Under-19 Championship
Winner	2016 Slovakia
- * Club domestic league appearances and goals as of 22 November 2026 ‡ National team caps and goals as of 10 October 2026

Clara Coline Mona Mateo (born 28 November 1997) is a French professional footballer who plays as a forward or attacking midfielder for Première Ligue club Paris FC, which she captains, and the France national team.

== Club career ==
Mateo started her career with US Sainte-Luce-sur-Loire at the age of six. In 2012, she joined Vendée La Roche.

Mateo joined FCF Juvisy in June 2016. The club became the women's section of Paris FC a year later. During the 2024–25 season, she scored 18 goals to finish as the league's top goalscorer. She was also named Player of the Season by both the UNFP and the LFFP. In August 2025, she was named among the nominees for the 2025 Ballon d'Or.

In January 2026, Mateo extended her contract with Paris FC until June 2029. On 11 March 2026, she scored her 100th goal for the club in a 3–0 victory over Strasbourg.

== International career ==
Mateo has represented France at various youth levels. She was part of the French squad that won the 2016 UEFA Women's Under-19 Championship. Having scored three goals in the tournament, she was named in the team of the tournament. She was also part of the French squad that finished as runners-up at the 2016 FIFA U-20 Women's World Cup.

Mateo made her debut for the France national team on 27 November 2020 in a 3–0 win against Austria. She scored her first goal four days later in a 12–0 win against Kazakhstan. In May 2022, she was named in France's squad for the UEFA Women's Euro 2022. In July 2023, she was included in the squad for the 2023 FIFA Women's World Cup.

In June 2025, Mateo was named in the French squad for the UEFA Women's Euro 2025. On 2 December 2025, she scored in a 2–2 draw against Sweden, helping France finish third in the 2025 UEFA Women's Nations League.

== Personal life ==
Mateo supports FC Nantes and considers Zinedine Zidane her footballing idol. In September 2020, she graduated with a degree in engineering. In March 2021, she joined Arkema as a business developer.

== Career statistics ==
=== International ===
As of match played 10 October 2026

Appearances and goals by national team and year
National team	Year	Apps	Goals
France	2020	2	1
France	2021	4	0
France	2022	13	3
France	2023	10	0
France	2024	2	1
France	2025	13	5
France	2026	6	1
Total		50	11

Scores and results list France's goal tally first, score column indicates score after each Mateo goal.

List of international goals scored by Clara Mateo
No.	Date	Venue	Opponent	Score	Result	Competition
1	1 December 2020	Stade de la Rabine, Vannes, France	Kazakhstan	12–0	12–0	2022 UEFA Women's Euro qualification
2	1 July 2022	Stade de la Source, Orléans, France	Vietnam	5–0	7–0	Friendly
3	2 September 2022	Lilleküla Stadium, Tallinn, Estonia	Estonia	7–0	9–0	2023 FIFA Women's World Cup qualification
4	2 September 2022	Lilleküla Stadium, Tallinn, Estonia	Estonia	8–0	9–0	2023 FIFA Women's World Cup qualification
5	25 October 2024	Stade Auguste-Bonal, Montbéliard, France	Jamaica	1–0	3–0	Friendly
6	8 April 2025	Ullevaal Stadion, Oslo, Norway	Norway	2–0	2–0	2025 UEFA Women's Nations League
7	30 May 2025	Stade Marcel Picot, Tomblaine, France	Switzerland	1–0	4–0	2025 UEFA Women's Nations League
8	9 July 2025	Kybunpark, St. Gallen, Switzerland	Wales	1–0	4–1	UEFA Women's Euro 2025
9	28 October 2025	Stade Michel d'Ornano, Caen, France	Germany	2–2	2–2	2025 UEFA Women's Nations League Finals
10	2 December 2025	Nationalarenan, Stockholm, Sweden	Sweden	1–0	2–2	2025 UEFA Women's Nations League Finals
11	10 October 2026	Stade Francis Le Basser, Laval, France	Latvia	8–0	9–0	Friendly

== Honours ==
Paris FC

- Coupe de France Féminine: 2024–25

France U19

- UEFA Women's Under-19 Championship: 2016

France U20

- FIFA U-20 Women's World Cup runners-up: 2016

France

- UEFA Women's Nations League runners-up: 2023–24

Individual

- UEFA Women's Under-17 Championship team of the tournament: 2014
- UEFA Women's Under-19 Championship team of the tournament: 2016
- UNFP Première Ligue player of the year: 2024–25
- LFFP Première Ligue best player: 2024–25
- UNFP Première Ligue team of the year: 2021–22, 2024–25, 2025–26
- LFFP Première Ligue team of the season: 2021–22, 2024–25
- Première Ligue top goalscorer: 2024–25
- Première Ligue Player of the Month: February 2022, November 2024, December 2024, September 2025
