= UEFA stadium categories =

Categories of requirements for football stadiums set by UEFA

The Bernabéu Stadium, the home of Real Madrid.

UEFA stadium categories are categories for football stadiums laid out in UEFA's Stadium Infrastructure Regulations. Using these regulations, stadiums are rated as category one, two, three, or four (renamed from elite) in ascending ranking order. These categories replaced the previous method of ranking stadiums on one to five star scale in 2006.

UEFA does not publish lists of stadiums fulfilling the criteria for any of the categories defined in the UEFA Stadium Infrastructure Regulations, but all assigned stadium categories are visible in UEFA's TIME platform, which is not open to the general public.

== General ==
If a retractable roof is present, its use will be directed by consultation between the UEFA delegate and the main assigned referee.

Although the minimum stadium capacity for category four is 8,000, only one stadium with a capacity less than 60,000 has been selected to host a UEFA Champions League and the UEFA Euro finals and 30,000 for the UEFA Europa League and the UEFA Nations League finals, since these regulations were introduced in 2006.

After the 2007 Champions League final, UEFA President Michel Platini stated that he wanted European Cup finals to be held at stadiums with an average capacity of 70,000 to solve security issues. The hosts for the finals between 2008 and 2024 (Luzhniki Stadium, Stadio Olimpico, Santiago Bernabéu, Wembley Stadium, Allianz Arena, Olympiastadion, San Siro, Millennium Stadium, Olimpiyskiy Stadium, Stade de France, Atatürk Stadium) all had capacities of at least 70,000 seats—with the exceptions of 2014 and 2019 finals (Estádio da Luz and Metropolitano Stadium) held with capacities of 65,000 seats. Two finals were played during the coronavirus pandemic in 2020 and 2021 in stadiums reaching 50,000 seats (Estádio da Luz and Estádio do Dragão) with none or reduced attendances.

== Criteria ==
Criteria	Category 1	Category 2	Category 3	Category 4
Field of play	100 to 105 m long, 64 to 68 m wide (109–115 yd × 70–74 yd). Pitch watering facilities must be available.		105 m long, 68 m wide (115 yd × 74 yd). Automated under-soil pitch irrigation system and pitch heating and/or pitch cover (depending on the location and climate) must be available.	
Goals and spare goal	—N/a		No additional structural elements or physical support may be used inside the net or in its immediate surroundings other than bars fixing the goal net to the ground and goal net stanchions behind and outside the net. Portable goals must not be used.	
Team dressing rooms	Recommended dimensions: 60 m^{2} (650 sq ft). Sanitary facilities: 5 showers; 2 separate seated toilets; Player and team official changing area: Seating and clothes-hanging facilities or lockers for at least 26 people; 1 large refrigerator; 1 TV monitor (with appropriate connections for projecting) or 1 tactical board; Physiotherapy: 1 massage table; Storage: 1 table and/or free storage space		Sanitary facilities: 6 showers; 3 separate seated toilets; Player changing area (recommended dimensions: 55 m^{2} (590 sq ft)): Seating and clothes-hanging facilities or lockers for at least 23 players; 1 large refrigerator; 1 TV monitor (with appropriate connections for projecting) or 1 tactical board; Team official changing area (recommended dimensions: 20 m^{2} (220 sq ft)): Seating and clothes-hanging facilities or lockers for at least 7 team officials; 1 table; 2 chairs; Physiotherapy (recommended dimensions: 15 m^{2} (160 sq ft)): 3 massage tables; Storage (recommended dimensions: 5 m^{2} (54 sq ft)): 1 table and/or free storage space	
Minimum floodlighting	>350 lux or sufficient to allow the host broadcaster to ensure adequate broadcasting of the match	800 lux Eh average horizontal illuminance with uniformity ratios of U1h >0.4 and U2h >0.6 350 lux Ev average vertical illuminance on each reference plane with uniformity ratios U1v >0.35 and U2v >0.45 An independent backup power supply must be available and able to provide at least the average horizontal illuminance of 350 lux of both matches played under floodlights and broadcast matches.	1200 lux Eh average horizontal illuminance with uniformity ratios of U1h >0.4 and U2h >0.6 700 lux Ev average vertical illuminance on each reference plane with uniformity ratios of U1v >0.35 and U2v >0.45 An independent backup power supply must be available and able to provide at least the average horizontal illuminance of 350 lux for matches played under floodlights and 800 lux for broadcast matches.	1400 lux Eh average horizontal illuminance with uniformity ratios of U1h >0.5 and U2h >0.7 1000 lux Ev average vertical illuminance on each reference plane with uniformity ratios of U1v >0.4 and U2v >0.5 An independent backup power supply must be available and able to provide at least the average horizontal illuminance of 350 lux for matches played under floodlights and 900 lux for broadcast matches no more than 15 minutes after the power failure.
Spectator standing allowed	Yes	No		
Minimum seated capacity	200	1,500	4,500	8,000
Turnstiles and electronic ticket control system	—N/a		All public entrances must be equipped with turnstiles and an electronic ticket control system designed to prevent the use of counterfeit tickets and deliver real-time flow rates and entrance numbers to a central point with a view to preventing overcrowding in the stadium as a whole or in individual sectors. There must be at least 1 turnstile for every 660 spectators.	
Minimum total VIP seats	50		75	100
VIP parking	20	50	100	150
Closed-circuit television system (CCTV)	—N/a		Closed-circuit television system that uses colour surveillance cameras with pan, tilt and zoom functions and covers all stadium approaches and entrances, and all public areas within the stadium. Areas of the stadium interior not capable of being directly viewed from the control room must be covered by the closed-circuit television system. The cameras must be capable of recording moving images as well as still photographs.	
Control room	—N/a	Control room with an overview of the stadium interior, equipped with radio communications enabling communication between staff and officials responsible for safety, security and service at the stadium.	Category 2, plus also equipped with colour monitors that are connected to the closed-circuit television system and additional monitors that display live data from the electronic ticket control system.	
Minimum media working area	10 working positions	20 working positions	30 working positions	
Photographers' working area	—N/a		15 working positions	20 working positions
Minimum media seating	10, 5 with desks	20, 10 with desks	30, 15 with desks	60, 30 with desks
Minimum space for main camera platform	2 m × 2 m (6.6 ft × 6.6 ft) for 1 camera (only for matches that are being broadcast)	4 m × 2 m (13.1 ft × 6.6 ft) for 2 cameras		6 m × 2 m (19.7 ft × 6.6 ft) for at least 3 cameras
Additional camera platforms	As for category 3 and 4 if the stadium is used in a competition or competition round for which the use of VAR is foreseen		Two 16 m camera platforms, located on the same side and at least at the same height as the main camera platform, each measuring at least 2 m × 2 m (6.6 ft × 6.6 ft) to accommodate one camera on the 16 m line	Category 3, plus one reverse-angle camera platform centrally located in the stand opposite the main camera, measuring at least 2 m × 2 m (6.6 ft × 6.6 ft) to accommodate at least one camera and two camera platforms located in the stands, one behind each goal, each measuring at least 2 m × 2 m (6.6 ft × 6.6 ft) to accommodate one camera at a height permitting an unobstructed view of the penalty spot from above the crossbar
Minimum number of commentary positions	1 (only for matches that are being broadcast)	3	5	10
Minimum number of TV studios	1 studio, measuring 5 m × 5 m × 2.5 m (16.4 ft × 16.4 ft × 8.2 ft)		2 studios, measuring the same as in category 1 and 2	Category 3, plus one of them must be a pitch-view studio with an unobstructed view of the entire field of play.
Minimum post-match interview positions	—N/a		At least 4, each 4 by 3 metres (13.1 ft × 9.8 ft)	
Minimum outside broadcast van area	300 m^{2} (3,200 sq ft)	400 m^{2} (4,300 sq ft)	600 m^{2} (6,500 sq ft)	1,000 m^{2} (11,000 sq ft)
Press conference room	If space allows it, a press conference room must be located within the stadium. It may be part of the media working area.	A press conference room must be available within the stadium. It may be part of the media working area and must be equipped with a top table and podium, a camera platform, a sound system (microphones, speakers and split box) and adequate lighting for broadcasting. The minimum number of seats is 20.	Category 2, but with a minimum number of 30 seats.	Category 2, but it may no longer be part of the media working area, the camera platform must be large enough to accommodate a minimum of 8 cameras, the split box must have a minimum of 16 outputs and the minimum number of seats is 50.
Mixed zone	—N/a			To be covered and large enough for at least 50 media representatives.

== Category requirements by competition ==
Competition	Requirements
UEFA Champions League	First and second qualifying round: category 2 Third qualifying round: category 3 From the play-offs onwards: category 4
UEFA Europa League	First and second qualifying round: category 2 Third qualifying round and play-offs: category 3 From the league stage onwards: category 4
UEFA Conference League	First and second qualifying round: category 2 Third qualifying round and play-offs: category 3 From the league stage onwards: category 4
UEFA Youth League	Category 1
UEFA Women's Champions League	Category 1
UEFA Women's Europa Cup	Category 1
UEFA European Championship	Category 4
UEFA European Under-21 Championship	Qualifying competition: category 2 Final tournament: category 3 or 4
UEFA European Under-19 Championship	Category 1
UEFA European Under-17 Championship	Category 1
UEFA Nations League	Category 4
UEFA Women's Championship (including the UEFA Women's Nations League preceding it)	Nations League group stage and Women's European Qualifiers: category 2 Nations League final, third-place match and Women's Euro final tournament: category 4
UEFA Women's Under-19 Championship	Category 1
UEFA Women's Under-17 Championship	Category 1
The UEFA Women's Nations League edition preceding the qualifying competition for the FIFA Women's World Cup and those qualifiers themselves	Up to and including the two-legged third-place matches as well as the Women’s European Qualifiers: category 2 The final: category 4
UEFA Regions' Cup	Category 1

== See also ==
- List of European stadiums by capacity
