= UEFA Women's Nations League =

International women's association football tournament

- Organiser(s): UEFA
- Founded: 2 November 2022; 4 years ago
- Region: Europe
- Teams: Maximum of 55
- Related competitions: UEFA Nations League
- Current champions: Spain (2nd title)
- Most championships: Spain (2 titles)
- Website: uefa.com/womensnationsleague
- 2027 UEFA Women's Nations League

The UEFA Women's Nations League is a biennial international women's football competition contested by the senior women's national teams of the member associations of UEFA, the sport's European governing body.

The competition feature three leagues, with promotion and relegation between them in addition to a final tournament to determine the champions. It also acts as part of the qualifying process for the UEFA Women's Championship, FIFA Women's World Cup and Women's Olympic Football Tournament, depending on the season.

== History ==
On 2 November 2022, the UEFA Executive Committee approved a new women's national team competition system, which was publicly announced the following day. This included the announcement of a women's Nations League competition beginning in 2023. The new system came as part of the UEFA women's football strategy for 2019 to 2024 and was approved after discussions between representatives of national associations and the recommendation of the UEFA Women's Football Committee. The Women's Nations League acts as the first phase of a two-part women's national team competition cycle, with the other phase being the European qualifiers for the UEFA Women's Championship or FIFA Women's World Cup.

The new system is designed to create more competitive matches, with teams facing others of similar strength, while generating a greater sporting and commercial interest in women's national team football. However, the system still gives all national teams a chance of qualifying for major international tournaments. The interconnected competition cycles are intended to encourage the long-term development of women's national teams. Before the changes, European qualifiers often had mismatched ties.

== Format ==
The competition begins with the league stage, featuring the national teams split into three leagues (A, B, and C). Leagues A and B both consist of 16 teams in 4 groups of 4, while League C consists of the remaining competition entrants split into groups of three or four. The teams in each group play against each other home-and-away in a round-robin format. The four group winners of League A advance to the Nations League Finals, organized by the participating teams, which feature two-legged semi-finals (single-leg for first edition), a third-place play-off, and a final. In Summer Olympic years, the Nations League Finals determine the teams that will qualify for the Women's Olympic Football Tournament.

In addition, the competition features promotion and relegation, which takes effect in the next edition of qualification for the UEFA Women's Championship or FIFA Women's World Cup (both of which have an identical league structure). The group winners of Leagues B and C are automatically promoted, while the fourth-placed teams in Leagues A and B, as well as the two lowest-ranked third-placed team in League B (conditional upon the number of entrants), are automatically relegated. Promotion/relegation matches are also held on a home-and-away basis, taking place in parallel with the Nations League Finals, with the winners going into the higher league and the losers going into the lower league. The third-placed teams of League A will play the runners-up of League B, while the two best-ranked third-placed teams in League B will play the two best-ranked League C runners-up (conditional upon the number of entrants), with the team from the higher league hosting the second leg.

=== Link with European qualifiers ===
The Women's Nations League is linked with qualification for the UEFA Women's Championship and FIFA Women's World Cup. The qualifiers for both competitions use the same league stage system as the Women's Nations League, with teams split into Leagues A, B, and C. Teams in qualification are split into leagues based on the results of the prior edition of the Women's Nations League. The results of the qualification league stage determine which teams qualify automatically for the Women's Euro or World Cup, and which teams enter the play-offs. In addition, teams are automatically promoted and relegated using the same format as in the Women's Nations League, though no promotion/relegation matches take place. This determines the league composition for the next edition of the Women's Nations League.

== Finals ==
Season	Hosts	Final			Third-place play-off		
Season	Hosts	Winners	Score	Runners-up	Third	Score	Fourth
2023–24; Finals	France; Netherlands; Spain	Spain	2–0	France	Germany	2–0	Netherlands
2025; Finals	France; Germany; Spain; Sweden	Spain	3–0 (agg.)	Germany	France	4–3 (agg.) (a.e.t.)	Sweden
2027; Finals							

== Teams reaching the top four ==
Team	Winners	Runners-up	Third place	Fourth place	Total
Spain	2 (2024, 2025)				2
France		1 (2024)	1 (2025)		2
Germany		1 (2025)	1 (2024)		2
Netherlands				1 (2024)	1
Sweden				1 (2025)	1

== Records and statistics ==
=== Top goalscorers ===
Season	League A		League B		League C	
Season	Player	Goal	Player	Goal	Player	Goal
2023–24	(Netherlands) Lineth Beerensteyn	6	(Poland) Ewa Pajor (Republic of Ireland) Kyra Carusa (Republic of Ireland) Katie McCabe	5	(Israel) Sharon Beck	9
2025	(Belgium) Tessa Wullaert (France) Sandy Baltimore (Germany) Lea Schüller	5	(Albania) Fortesa Berisha (Czech Republic) Kateřina Svitková (Slovenia) Zara Kramžar	5	(Luxembourg) Amy Thompson (Slovakia) Tamara Morávková	6

== Comprehensive team results by tournament ==
This table shows the overall performance of each team per Nations League season, including the intervening UEFA Women's Championship or FIFA Women's World Cup qualifying competitions which use an identical league structure, and teams' promotion/relegation between the leagues.

Key:

- 1 – Champions
- 2 – Runners-up
- 3 – Third place
- 4 – Fourth place
- ▲ – Promoted
- – No movement
- ▼ – Relegated
- * – Participated in promotion/relegation play-offs
- Q – Qualified for upcoming UEFA Women's Nations League Finals
- P/R – Qualified for upcoming promotion/relegation play-offs

National team	Seasons in league			Season											
National team	Seasons in league			Nations League 2023–24			Euro 2025 qualifying			Nations League 2025			World Cup 2027 qualifying		
National team	A	B	C	Lg	Rk	M	Lg	Rk	M	Lg	Rk	M	Lg	Rk	M
Albania	–	3	1	B	32	▼	C	37	▲	B	25	*	B	25	Same position
Andorra	–	–	4	C	47	Same position	C	51	Same position	C	51	Same position	C	51	Same position
Armenia	–	–	4	C	51	Same position	C	44	Same position	C	46	Same position	C	47	Same position
Austria	4	–	–	A	8	Same position	A	11	Same position	A	11	*	A	12	Same position
Azerbaijan	–	1	3	C	37	▲	B	29	▼	C	41	Same position	C	41	Same position
Belarus	–	2	2	B	30	▼	C	35	▲	B	30	▼	C	36	▲
Belgium	3	1	–	A	10	*	A	12	Same position	A	10	▼*	B	22	Same position
Bosnia and Herzegovina	–	3	1	B	21	*	B	27	Same position	B	27	▼	C	44	Same position
Bulgaria	–	–	4	C	40	*	C	41	Same position	C	47	Same position	C	49	Same position
Croatia	–	3	1	B	23	*	B	25	Same position	B	31	▼	C	39	Same position
Cyprus	–	–	4	C	46	Same position	C	50	Same position	C	39	*	C	46	Same position
Czech Republic	1	3	–	B	20	▲	A	14	▼	B	22	*	B	24	Same position
Denmark	4	–	–	A	6	Same position	A	6	Same position	A	9	*	A	3	Same position
England	4	–	–	A	5	Same position	A	7	Same position	A	6	Same position	A	5	Same position
Estonia	–	–	4	C	41	Same position	C	46	Same position	C	44	Same position	C	45	Same position
Faroe Islands	–	–	4	C	50	Same position	C	42	Same position	C	42	Same position	C	42	Same position
Finland	1	3	–	B	18	▲	A	13	▼	B	23	*	B	21	Same position
France	4	–	–	A	2	Same position	A	3	Same position	A	3	Same position	A	4	Same position
Georgia	–	–	4	C	48	Same position	C	40	Same position	C	50	Same position	C	48	Same position
Germany	4	–	–	A	3	Same position	A	2	Same position	A	2	Same position	A	1	Same position
Gibraltar	–	–	2	Did not enter						C	53	Same position	C	53	Same position
Greece	–	2	2	B	29	▼	C	36	▲	B	32	▼	C	34	▲
Hungary	–	3	1	B	24	*	B	26	Same position	B	28	▼	C	33	▲
Iceland	4	–	–	A	9	*	A	5	Same position	A	12	*	A	11	Same position
Israel	–	2	2	C	35	▲	B	31	▼	C	34	▲	B	28	▼
Italy	4	–	–	A	7	Same position	A	4	Same position	A	7	Same position	A	8	Same position
Kazakhstan	–	–	4	C	44	Same position	C	48	Same position	C	43	Same position	C	40	Same position
Kosovo	–	1	3	C	36	▲	B	32	▼	C	40	*	C	37	▲
Latvia	–	1	3	C	38	*	C	42	Same position	C	38	▲	B	30	▼
Liechtenstein	–	–	2	Did not enter						C	52	Same position	C	52	Same position
Lithuania	–	–	4	C	42	Same position	C	47	Same position	C	45	Same position	C	38	▲
Luxembourg	–	1	3	C	43	Same position	C	38	Same position	C	35	▲	B	32	▼
Malta	–	2	2	C	34	▲	B	30	▼	C	36	▲	B	31	▼
Moldova	–	–	4	C	49	Same position	C	49	Same position	C	48	Same position	C	43	Same position
Montenegro	–	1	3	C	39	*	C	39	Same position	C	37	▲	B	29	▼
Netherlands	4	–	–	A	4	Same position	A	8	Same position	A	5	Same position	A	7	Same position
North Macedonia	–	–	4	C	45	Same position	C	45	Same position	C	49	Same position	C	50	Same position
Northern Ireland	–	4	–	B	26	*	B	23	Same position	B	24	*	B	26	Same position
Norway	4	–	–	A	12	*	A	10	Same position	A	8	Same position	A	6	Same position
Poland	2	2	–	B	19	▲	A	16	▼	B	17	▲	A	14	▼
Portugal	2	2	–	A	13	▼	B	17	▲	A	13	▼	B	18	▲
Republic of Ireland	2	2	–	B	17	▲	A	15	▼	B	21	▲*	A	9	Same position
Romania	–	2	2	B	31	▼	C	34	▲	B	29	▼	C	35	▲
Scotland	2	2	–	A	15	▼	B	18	▲	A	16	▼	B	19	▲
Serbia	1	3	–	B	22	*	B	21	Same position	B	19	▲	A	15	▼
Slovakia	–	3	1	B	25	*	B	28	▼	C	33	▲	B	27	▼
Slovenia	1	2	1	B	28	▼	C	33	▲	B	18	▲	A	13	▼
Spain	4	–	–	A	1	Same position	A	1	Same position	A	1	Same position	A	2	Same position
Sweden	4	–	–	A	11	*	A	9	Same position	A	4	Same position	A	10	Same position
Switzerland	2	2	–	A	14	▼	B	19	▲	A	15	▼	B	17	▲
Turkey	–	3	1	C	33	▲	B	24	Same position	B	26	*	B	23	Same position
Ukraine	1	3	–	B	27	*	B	22	Same position	B	20	▲	A	16	▼
Wales	2	2	–	A	16	▼	B	20	▲	A	14	▼	B	20	▲

== See also ==
- UEFA Nations League (men's competition)
