= Selina Cerci =

German footballer (born 2000)

- Çerçi with Arsenal in 2026

Personal information
- Date of birth: 31 May 2000 (age 26)
- Place of birth: Kiel, Germany
- Height: 1.71 m (5 ft 7 in)
- Position: Forward

Team information
- Current team: Arsenal
- Number: 29

Youth career
- –2015: Holstein Kiel
- 2016–2017: Magdeburger FFC

Senior career*
| Years | Team | Apps | (Gls) |
| 2017–2018 | Bayern Munich II | 22 | (14) |
| 2018–2020 | Werder Bremen | 27 | (18) |
| 2020–2022 | Turbine Potsdam | 37 | (21) |
| 2022–2024 | 1. FC Köln | 17 | (4) |
| 2024–2026 | TSG Hoffenheim | 43 | (32) |
| 2026– | Arsenal | 3 | (0) |

International career^{‡}
| 2022– | Germany | 20 | (5) |
- * Club domestic league appearances and goals as of 23:35, 4 October 2026 (UTC) ‡ National team caps and goals as of 22:45, 9 June 2026 (UTC)

Selina Çerçi (born 31 May 2000) is a German professional footballer who plays as a forward for Women's Super League club Arsenal and the Germany national team.

== Club career ==
Cerci started playing football at SV Friedrichsort and moved to Holstein Kiel's B youth team as a 14-year-old. In January 2016 she made the move to the B youth team of Magdeburger FFC, for whom she scored 23 goals in 15 games in the B junior Bundesliga, in the Nordost season.

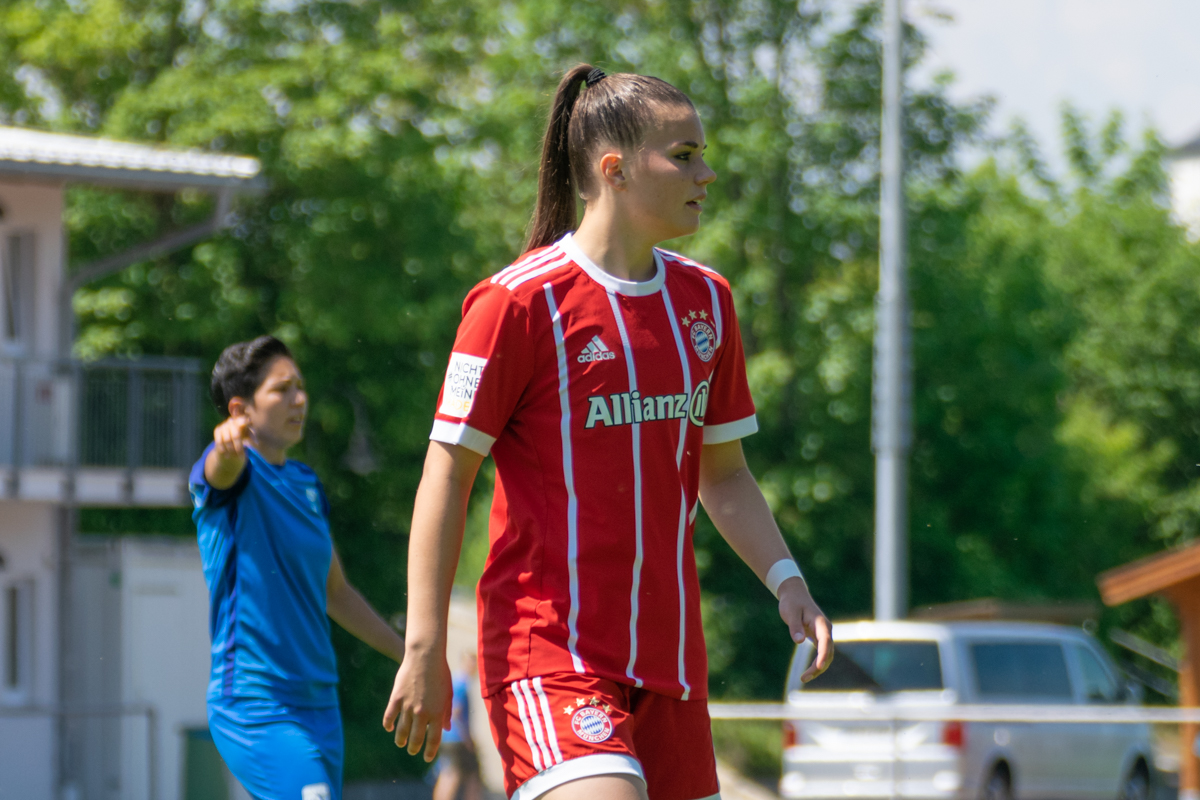
Çerçi with Bayern Munich II in 2018

Signed by Bayern Munich, she played all league games for their second team in the 2017–18 season in the then two-tier 2. Bundesliga and finished the South Group with her team in second place - two points behind TSG 1899 Hoffenheim, the champions. She made her senior debut on 3 September 2017 (1st matchday) in a 1–0 win in the home game against newcomers SG 99 Andernach. She scored her first of 14 goals on matchday 2 in a 2–0 win in the away game against SC Freiburg II.

She made her Bundesliga debut on 25 November 2018 (9th matchday) for Werder Bremen, the club that signed her for the 2018–19 season, in the 4–1 defeat in the away game against Bayern Munich. She scored five goals in her 13 league games, including the 2–0 in the 53rd minute and the final score in the 89th minute in the 5–0 win in the home game against Borussia Mönchengladbach on 9 December 2018 (12th matchday). However, their team was unable to prevent relegation to the now single-track 2. Bundesliga.

For the 2020–21 season she was signed by Bundesliga club 1. FFC Turbine Potsdam and was her team's most successful goalscorer with 8 goals in her first season. She was leading the Bundesliga top scorers list with 13 goals in the 2021–22 season when she suffered an anterior cruciate ligament injury on matchday 15. By the end of the season she was unable to play any more games and was overtaken in the top scorer list by Lea Schüller, who scored 16 goals in 22 games. For the following 2022–23 season, the move to league rivals 1. FC Köln was announced at the end of June 2022.

In May 2024, Cerci was signed by TSG Hoffenheim. In her Hoffenheim debut at SGS Essen, Cerci scored in the 6th minute to set up a 2–1 victory. By the winter break, Cerci had scored five goals, the last of which having been the decider in a 1–0 win over Essen. After scoring again with a mazy run and precise finish in a 3–0 win at SC Freiburg, Cerci scored against Leverkusen to once again decide a 1–0 fixture. She began a run of excellent form in March, scoring two and winning a penalty against Köln (5–1), netting two goals with an assist to boot in a 7–0 versus Potsdam, and getting two assists alongside a goal during a 5–2 win over Leipzig. Following a 2–1 loss to Wolfsburg and a 3–1 defeat at Eintracht Frankfurt (where she scored), Cerci capped off her season with a hattrick against Jena. This raised her goal-scoring tally to 16, meaning she won the Torschützenkanone as the league's highest-scoring player alongside Wolfsburg's Lineth Beerensteyn.

On 6 July 2026, it was announced that Cerci had joined the Women's Super League club Arsenal on a two-year contract and would wear the number 29 jersey.

== International career ==
On 8 February 2022, Cerci was nominated for the senior national team for the first time. She made her international debut for Germany in the 2022 Arnold Clark Cup on 17 February 2022, coming on as a substitute in the 78th minute for Jule Brand against Spain. The match finished as a 1–1 draw.

Due to a cruciate ligament injury, Cerci missed the 2022 Euros. She then missed out on the 2023 World Cup, before returning to the Germany squad in October 2024 after a two-year absence. Cerci scored her maiden goal for the national team in a friendly against Australia, heading in the opening goal; however, she later enabled Australia's equalizer with an intercepted pass. In the run-up to the 2025 Euros, Cerci scored a hattrick against Scotland and another goal against Austria during Germany's 2025 Nations League campaign.

On 12 June 2025, Cerci was called up to the Germany squad for the UEFA Women's Euro 2025.

== Personal life ==
Cerci is of Turkish and Azerbaijani descent, with her family originally hailing from Afyonkarahisar, Turkey. She grew up supporting Arsenal F.C. and her favourite all time player is Dennis Bergkamp.

== Career statistics ==
=== International ===
As of 9 June 2026

Appearances and goals by national team and year
| National team | Year | Apps | Goals |
|---|---|---|---|
| Germany | 2022 | 2 | 0 |
| Germany | 2024 | 3 | 1 |
| Germany | 2025 | 12 | 4 |
| Germany | 2026 | 3 | 0 |
| Total | | 20 | 5 |

Scores and results list Germany's goal tally first, score column indicates score after each Cerci goal.

List of international goals scored by Selina Cerci
| No. | Date | Venue | Opponent | Score | Result | Competition |
|---|---|---|---|---|---|---|
| 1 | 28 October 2024 | Duisburg, Germany | Australia | 1–0 | 1–2 | Friendly |
| 2 | 8 April 2025 | Wolfsburg, Germany | Scotland | 1–1 | 6–1 | 2025 UEFA Women's Nations League |
| 3 | 8 April 2025 | Wolfsburg, Germany | Scotland | 2–1 | 6–1 | 2025 UEFA Women's Nations League |
| 4 | 8 April 2025 | Wolfsburg, Germany | Scotland | 6–1 | 6–1 | 2025 UEFA Women's Nations League |
| 5 | 3 June 2025 | Vienna, Austria | Austria | 3–0 | 6–0 | 2025 UEFA Women's Nations League |
