= 2025 UEFA Women's Nations League =

Tournament details
- Dates: League phase: 21 February – 3 June 2025; Promotion/relegation matches: 24–29 October 2025; Nations League Finals: 24 October – 2 December
- Teams: 53

Final positions
- Champions: Spain (2nd title)
- Runners-up: Germany
- Third place: France
- Fourth place: Sweden

Tournament statistics
- Matches played: 170
- Goals scored: 514 (3.02 per match)
- Attendance: 839,370 (4,937 per match)
- Top scorer(s): (Belgium) Tessa Wullaert (8 goals)
- Women's European Qualifiers Women's Nations League

The 2025 UEFA Women's Nations League was the second season of the UEFA Women's Nations League, an international women's football competition contested by the senior women's national teams of the member associations of UEFA. The league phase of the competition was played between February and June, with the finals tournament took place between October and December. The results also determined the leagues for the FIFA Women's World Cup 2027 qualifying competition.

Spain, the defending champions, successfully defended the title after beating Germany 3–0 on aggregate in the 2025 finals.

== Format ==
The competition began with the league stage, featuring the national teams split into three leagues (A, B, and C) according to the Women’s European Qualifiers overall phase rankings (based on the Women's Euro 2025 qualifying overall ranking, taking into consideration promotion/relegation at the conclusion of that competition). Leagues A and B featured 16 teams in four groups of four teams, while League C consisted of the remaining competition entrants split into groups of three or four teams. The teams in each group played against each other home-and-away in a round-robin format.

The four group winners of League A advanced to the Nations League Finals, consisting of two semi-finals, a third place play-off, and a final, all played over two legs (this differed to the previous edition where all the Nations Leagues Finals matches were single-legged). An open draw determined the pairings and order of legs for the semi-final matches, as well as which semi-final pairing will have its teams host the first leg of the third-place play-off and final.

In addition, the competition featured promotion and relegation, taking effect in Women's World Cup 2027 qualifying (which uses an identical league structure). The group winners of Leagues B and C were automatically promoted, while the fourth-placed teams in Leagues A and B, as well as the two lowest-ranked third-placed teams in League B, were automatically relegated. Promotion/relegation play-offs were also held on a home-and-away basis, taking place in parallel with the Nations League semi-finals, to determine which of the other teams were promoted, relegated or remain in their respective leagues. The third-placed teams of League A played the runners-up of League B, while the two best-ranked third-placed teams in League B played the two best-ranked League C runners-up. The teams from the higher leagues were seeded, and played the second leg at home.

In all two-legged ties, the team that scored more goals on aggregate was the winner. If the aggregate score was level, extra time would be played (the away goals rule did not apply). If the score remained level after extra time, a penalty shoot-out would be used to decide the winner.

== Tiebreakers ==
=== Tiebreakers for group ranking ===
If two or more teams in the same group were equal on points on completion of the league phase, the following tie-breaking criteria were applied:

1. Points obtained in matches played among the teams in question;
2. Goal difference in matches played among the teams in question;
3. Number of goals scored in the matches played among the teams in question;
4. If two or more teams are still tied after applying criteria a–c, those criteria are reapplied exclusively to the matches between the teams in question. If teams are still tied, then criteria e–k are applied;
5. Goal difference in all group matches;
6. Number of goals scored in all group matches;
7. Number of away goals scored in all group matches;
8. Number of wins in all group matches;
9. Number of away wins in all group matches;
10. Lower total of disciplinary points received by players and team officials in all group matches:
  - 1 point for a yellow card;
  - 3 points for a second yellow card in the same match (indirect red card);
  - 3 points for a direct red card;
11. Position in the Women's European Qualifiers overall phase ranking.

=== Criteria for league ranking ===
Individual league rankings were established according to the following criteria:

1. Position in the group;
2. Higher number of points;
3. Higher goal difference;
4. Higher number of goals scored;
5. Higher number of goals scored away from home;
6. Higher number of wins;
7. Higher number of wins away from home;
8. Lower disciplinary points total (1 point for a single yellow card, 3 points for a red card as a consequence of two yellow cards, 3 points for a direct red card, 4 points for a yellow card followed by a direct red card).
9. Position in the Women's European Qualifiers overall phase ranking.

When ranking teams in League C, due to differing group sizes, the results against the fourth-placed teams are not considered when comparing teams placed first, second, and third in their respective groups.

=== Criteria for overall ranking ===
After the conclusion of all group matches, the overall league rankings were established as follows:

1. The 16 League A teams are ranked 1st to 16th according to their league rankings.
2. The 16 League B teams are ranked 17th to 32nd according to their league rankings.
3. The League C teams are ranked 33rd onwards according to their league rankings.

The UEFA Women's Nations League overall phase rankings were established after the conclusion of the promotion/relegation play-offs, and were used to determine the starting positions and seeding of the teams in Women's World Cup 2027 qualifying. The order of the teams in the overall phase rankings is based on the overall league rankings, with the following modifications:

1. The automatically promoted teams are ranked above teams from lower leagues that were promoted after their promotion/relegation matches
2. The automatically relegated teams are ranked below teams from higher leagues that were relegated after their promotion/relegation matches

== Schedule ==
Below is the schedule for the 2025 UEFA Women's Nations League.

Stage	Round	Dates
League phase	Draw	7 November 2024
League phase	Matchday 1	21 February 2025
League phase	Matchday 2	25–26 February 2025
League phase	Matchday 3	4 April 2025
League phase	Matchday 4	8 April 2025
League phase	Matchday 5	30 May 2025
League phase	Matchday 6	3 June 2025
Promotion/relegation matches	Draw	6 June 2025
Promotion/relegation matches	First leg	22–28 October 2025
Promotion/relegation matches	Second leg	22–28 October 2025
Finals	Draw	6 June 2025
Finals	Semi-finals (two legs)	20–28 October 2025
Finals	Third-place playoff (two legs)	26 November – 2 December 2025
Finals	Final (two legs)	26 November – 2 December 2025

== Seeding ==
Teams league positions: League A League B League C Did not enter Suspended by UEFA

The leagues were formed according to the Women's European Qualifiers overall phase rankings, and were seeded into pots based on the same rankings.

Gibraltar and Liechtenstein entered the tournament for the first time, having not entered in the previous edition. This was both women's teams' first official competitive international tournament.

Russia were suspended indefinitely from all UEFA and FIFA competitions on 28 February 2022 due to their country's invasion of Ukraine. On 30 September 2024, UEFA confirmed they would not be permitted to enter this edition of the Women's Nations League, or to enter 2027 Women's World Cup qualifying.

San Marino did not submit an entry into the competition.

Key
▲	Promoted after UEFA Women's Euro 2025 qualifying
▼	Relegated after UEFA Women's Euro 2025 qualifying

League A
Pot	Team	Prv	Rank
1	Spain		1
1	Germany		2
1	France		3
1	Italy		4
2	Iceland		5
2	Denmark		6
2	England		7
2	Netherlands		8
3	Sweden		9
3	Norway		10
3	Austria		11
3	Belgium		12
4	Portugal	▲	13
4	Scotland	▲	14
4	Switzerland	▲	15
4	Wales	▲	16

League B
Pot	Team	Prv	Rank
1	Finland	▼	17
1	Czech Republic	▼	18
1	Republic of Ireland	▼	19
1	Poland	▼	20
2	Serbia		21
2	Ukraine		22
2	Northern Ireland		23
2	Turkey		24
3	Croatia		25
3	Hungary		26
3	Bosnia and Herzegovina		27
3	Slovenia	▲	28
4	Romania	▲	29
4	Belarus	▲	30
4	Greece	▲	31
4	Albania	▲	32

League C
Pot	Team	Prv	Rank
1	Slovakia	▼	33
1	Azerbaijan	▼	34
1	Malta	▼	35
1	Israel	▼	36
1	Kosovo	▼	37
1	Luxembourg		38
2	Montenegro		39
2	Georgia		40
2	Bulgaria		41
2	Latvia		42
2	Faroe Islands		43
2	Armenia		44
3	North Macedonia		45
3	Estonia		46
3	Lithuania		47
3	Kazakhstan		48
3	Moldova		49
3	Cyprus		50
4	Andorra		51
4	Gibraltar		52
4	Liechtenstein		53

Did not enter Team San Marino	Suspended from entering the competition Team Russia

== Draw ==
The draw took place on 7 November 2024 at 13:00 CET in Nyon, Switzerland.

Teams were drawn from their seeding pots into groups for each league, starting with League C, then League B, and finally League A. In each league, all teams were drawn from Pot 1 and assigned to groups in ascending order until the pot was empty, then the draw continued with Pot 2 and so on.

For political reasons, Armenia and Azerbaijan, as well as Belarus and Ukraine, could not be drawn in the same group. Due to excessive travel restrictions, Kazakhstan could not be drawn into a group containing more than one of Andorra, Faroe Islands, Gibraltar, or Malta.

== League A ==
=== Group A1 ===
Pos	Team	Pld	W	D	L	GF	GA	GD	Pts	Qualification or relegation	(Germany)	(Netherlands)	(Austria)	(Scotland)
1	Germany	6	5	1	0	26	4	+22	16	Qualification for Nations League Finals	—	4–0	4–1	6–1
2	Netherlands	6	3	2	1	11	10	+1	11		2–2	—	3–1	1–1
3	Austria (O)	6	2	0	4	5	16	−11	6	Qualification for relegation play-offs	0–6	1–3	—	1–0
4	Scotland (R)	6	0	1	5	3	15	−12	1	Relegation to League B	0–4	1–2	0–1	—

Source: UEFA
(O) Play-off winners; (R) Relegated

=== Group A2 ===
Pos	Team	Pld	W	D	L	GF	GA	GD	Pts	Qualification or relegation	(France)	(Norway)	(Iceland)	(Switzerland)
1	France	6	6	0	0	14	2	+12	18	Qualification for Nations League Finals	—	1–0	3–2	4–0
2	Norway	6	2	2	2	4	5	−1	8		0–2	—	1–1	2–1
3	Iceland (O)	6	0	4	2	6	9	−3	4	Qualification for relegation play-offs	0–2	0–0	—	3–3
4	Switzerland (R)	6	0	2	4	4	12	−8	2	Relegation to League B	0–2	0–1	0–0	—

Source: UEFA
(O) Play-off winners; (R) Relegated

=== Group A3 ===
Pos	Team	Pld	W	D	L	GF	GA	GD	Pts	Qualification or relegation	(Spain)	(England)	(Belgium)	(Portugal)
1	Spain	6	5	0	1	21	8	+13	15	Qualification for Nations League Finals	—	2–1	3–2	7–1
2	England	6	3	1	2	16	6	+10	10		1–0	—	5–0	6–0
3	Belgium (R)	6	2	0	4	9	16	−7	6	Qualification for relegation play-offs	1–5	3–2	—	0–1
4	Portugal (R)	6	1	1	4	5	21	−16	4	Relegation to League B	2–4	1–1	0–3	—

Source: UEFA
(R) Relegated

=== Group A4 ===
Pos	Team	Pld	W	D	L	GF	GA	GD	Pts	Qualification or relegation	(Sweden)	(Italy)	(Denmark)	(Wales)
1	Sweden	6	3	3	0	13	6	+7	12	Qualification for Nations League Finals	—	3–2	6–1	1–1
2	Italy	6	3	1	2	11	7	+4	10		0–0	—	1–3	1–0
3	Denmark (O)	6	3	0	3	8	13	−5	9	Qualification for relegation play-offs	1–2	0–3	—	1–0
4	Wales (R)	6	0	2	4	4	10	−6	2	Relegation to League B	1–1	1–4	1–2	—

Source: UEFA
(O) Play-off winners; (R) Relegated

=== Nations League Finals ===
The pairings and order of legs were determined via an open draw on 6 June 2025.

==== Bracket ====
Semi-finals
24–28 October Düsseldorf And Caen
Germany	1	2	3
France	0	2	2
24–28 October Malaga And Gothenburg
Sweden	0	0	0
Spain	4	1	5

Final
28 November – 2 December Kaiserslautern And Madrid
Germany	0	0	0
Spain	0	3	3
Third place play-off
28 November – 2 December Reims And Solna
France	2	2	4
Sweden	1	2	3

== League B ==
=== Group B1 ===
Pos	Team	Pld	W	D	L	GF	GA	GD	Pts	Promotion, qualification or relegation	(Poland)	(Northern Ireland)	(Bosnia and Herzegovina)	(Romania)
1	Poland (P)	6	5	1	0	16	2	+14	16	Promotion to League A	—	2–0	5–1	3–0
2	Northern Ireland	6	2	2	2	6	10	−4	8	Qualification for promotion play-offs	0–4	—	3–2	1–0
3	Bosnia and Herzegovina (R)	6	1	2	3	9	12	−3	5	Relegation to League C	1–1	1–1	—	4–0
4	Romania (R)	6	1	1	4	3	10	−7	4	Relegation to League C	0–1	1–1	2–0	—

Source: UEFA
(P) Promoted; (R) Relegated

=== Group B2 ===
Pos	Team	Pld	W	D	L	GF	GA	GD	Pts	Promotion, qualification or relegation	(Slovenia)	(Republic of Ireland)	(Turkey)	(Greece)
1	Slovenia (P)	6	5	0	1	12	2	+10	15 (Note: Head-to-head goal difference: Slovenia +3, Republic of Ireland –3.)	Promotion to League A	—	4–0	3–0	2–0
2	Republic of Ireland (O, P)	6	5	0	1	10	6	+4	15	Qualification for promotion play-offs	1–0	—	1–0	2–1
3	Turkey (O)	6	2	0	4	3	7	−4	6	Qualification for relegation play-offs	0–1	1–2	—	1–0
4	Greece (R)	6	0	0	6	2	12	−10	0	Relegation to League C	1–2	0–4	0–1	—

Source: UEFA
(O) Play-off winners; (P) Promoted; (R) Relegated

=== Group B3 ===
Pos	Team	Pld	W	D	L	GF	GA	GD	Pts	Promotion, qualification or relegation	(Serbia)	(Finland)	(Hungary)	(Belarus)
1	Serbia (P)	6	4	2	0	7	1	+6	14	Promotion to League A	—	1–0	1–0	0–0
2	Finland	6	3	2	1	8	2	+6	11	Qualification for promotion play-offs	1–1	—	3–0	0–0
3	Hungary (R)	6	1	1	4	2	6	−4	4	Relegation to League C	0–1	0–1	—	0–0
4	Belarus (R)	6	0	3	3	0	8	−8	3	Relegation to League C	0–3	0–3	0–2	—

Source: UEFA
(P) Promoted; (R) Relegated

=== Group B4 ===
Pos	Team	Pld	W	D	L	GF	GA	GD	Pts	Promotion, qualification or relegation	(Ukraine)	(Czech Republic)	(Albania)	(Croatia)
1	Ukraine (P)	6	4	1	1	8	6	+2	13 (Note: Head-to-head points: Ukraine 4, Czech Republic 1.)	Promotion to League A	—	1–0	2–1	2–1
2	Czech Republic	6	4	1	1	17	4	+13	13	Qualification for promotion play-offs	1–1	—	5–1	5–0
3	Albania (O)	6	2	0	4	10	12	−2	6	Qualification for relegation play-offs	1–2	1–2	—	4–0
4	Croatia (R)	6	1	0	5	4	17	−13	3	Relegation to League C	2–0	0–4	1–2	—

Source: UEFA
(O) Play-off winners; (P) Promoted; (R) Relegated

=== Ranking of third-placed teams ===
Pos	Grp	Team	Pld	W	D	L	GF	GA	GD	Pts	Qualification or relegation
1	B4	Albania	6	2	0	4	10	12	−2	6	Qualification for relegation play-offs
2	B2	Turkey	6	2	0	4	3	7	−4	6	Qualification for relegation play-offs
3	B1	Bosnia and Herzegovina	6	1	2	3	9	12	−3	5	Relegation to League C
4	B3	Hungary	6	1	1	4	2	6	−4	4	Relegation to League C

Source: UEFA
Rules for classification: Tiebreakers

== League C ==
=== Group C1 ===
Pos	Team	Pld	W	D	L	GF	GA	GD	Pts	Promotion or qualification	(Slovakia)	(Faroe Islands)	(Moldova)	(Gibraltar)
1	Slovakia (P)	6	6	0	0	27	1	+26	18	Promotion to League B	—	3–0	1–0	11–0
2	Faroe Islands	6	3	1	2	10	6	+4	10		1–2	—	2–0	5–0
3	Moldova	6	2	1	3	6	6	0	7		0–2	1–1	—	1–0
4	Gibraltar	6	0	0	6	0	30	−30	0		0–8	0–1	0–4	—

Source: UEFA
(P) Promoted

=== Group C2 ===
Pos	Team	Pld	W	D	L	GF	GA	GD	Pts	Promotion or qualification	(Malta)	(Cyprus)	(Georgia (country))	(Andorra)
1	Malta (P)	6	4	1	1	8	5	+3	13	Promotion to League B	—	1–0	2–1	1–0
2	Cyprus	6	3	1	2	9	8	+1	10	Qualification for promotion play-offs	2–1	—	2–1	2–2
3	Georgia	6	2	0	4	9	11	−2	6		2–3	1–2	—	2–1
4	Andorra	6	1	2	3	6	8	−2	5		0–0	2–1	1–2	—

Source: UEFA
(P) Promoted

=== Group C3 ===
Pos	Team	Pld	W	D	L	GF	GA	GD	Pts	Promotion or qualification	(Luxembourg)	(Kazakhstan)	(Armenia)	(Liechtenstein)
1	Luxembourg (P)	6	5	1	0	20	6	+14	16	Promotion to League B	—	2–2	2–0	7–0
2	Kazakhstan	6	3	1	2	14	9	+5	10		1–3	—	3–2	4–0
3	Armenia	6	2	1	3	13	11	+2	7		1–3	2–0	—	6–1
4	Liechtenstein	6	0	1	5	5	26	−21	1		2–3	0–4	2–2	—

Source: UEFA
(P) Promoted

=== Group C4 ===
Pos	Team	Pld	W	D	L	GF	GA	GD	Pts	Promotion or qualification	(Montenegro)	(Azerbaijan)	(Lithuania)
1	Montenegro (P)	4	2	2	0	5	2	+3	8	Promotion to League B	—	1–1	3–1
2	Azerbaijan	4	1	2	1	3	6	−3	5		0–0	—	0–5
3	Lithuania	4	1	0	3	6	6	0	3		0–1	0–2	—

Source: UEFA
(P) Promoted

=== Group C5 ===
Pos	Team	Pld	W	D	L	GF	GA	GD	Pts	Promotion or qualification	(Israel)	(Estonia)	(Bulgaria)
1	Israel (P)	4	3	1	0	12	5	+7	10	Promotion to League B	—	3–1	3–3
2	Estonia	4	1	1	2	2	6	−4	4		0–3	—	0–0
3	Bulgaria	4	0	2	2	4	7	−3	2		1–3	0–1	—

Source: UEFA
(P) Promoted

=== Group C6 ===
Pos	Team	Pld	W	D	L	GF	GA	GD	Pts	Promotion or qualification	(Latvia)	(Kosovo)	(North Macedonia)
1	Latvia (P)	4	2	2	0	6	4	+2	8	Promotion to League B	—	2–2	1–1
2	Kosovo	4	2	1	1	9	3	+6	7	Qualification for promotion play-offs	0–1	—	3–0
3	North Macedonia	4	0	1	3	2	10	−8	1		1–2	0–4	—

Source: UEFA
(P) Promoted

=== Ranking of second-placed teams ===
Due to differing group sizes in League C, results against fourth-placed teams were not considered when comparing second-placed teams.

Pos	Grp	Team	Pld	W	D	L	GF	GA	GD	Pts	Qualification
1	C2	Cyprus	4	3	0	1	6	4	+2	9	Qualification for promotion play-offs
2	C6	Kosovo	4	2	1	1	9	3	+6	7	Qualification for promotion play-offs
3	C4	Azerbaijan	4	1	2	1	3	6	−3	5	
4	C1	Faroe Islands	4	1	1	2	4	6	−2	4	
5	C3	Kazakhstan	4	1	1	2	6	9	−3	4	
6	C5	Estonia	4	1	1	2	2	6	−4	4	

Source: UEFA
Rules for classification: Tiebreakers

== Promotion/relegation matches ==
The pairings for the promotion/relegation matches were determined via a draw on 6 June 2025.

=== League A vs League B ===
Team 1	Agg.	Team 2	1st leg	2nd leg
Northern Ireland	0–5	Iceland	0–2	0–3
Finland	1–8	Denmark	1–6	0–2
Republic of Ireland	5–4	Belgium	4–2	1–2
Czech Republic	1–2	Austria	1–0	0–2

=== League B vs League C ===
Team 1	Agg.	Team 2	1st leg	2nd leg
Cyprus	3–5	Albania	3–2	0–3
Kosovo	0–7	Turkey	0–4	0–3

== Overall ranking ==
=== Overall league rankings ===
At the conclusion of the league phase, the results of each team's league rankings were used to calculate the overall league rankings, according to the ranking criteria.

Key
Promotion to higher league for 2027 Women's World Cup qualifying
Promotion playoff for higher league for 2027 Women's World Cup qualifying
Relegation playoff for lower league for 2027 Women's World Cup qualifying
Relegation to lower league for 2027 Women's World Cup qualifying

League A
Rnk	Team	Pld	Pts
1	France	6	18
2	Germany	6	16
3	Spain	6	15
4	Sweden	6	12
5	Netherlands	6	11
6	England	6	10
7	Italy	6	10
8	Norway	6	8
9	Denmark	6	9
10	Belgium	6	6
11	Austria	6	6
12	Iceland	6	4
13	Portugal	6	4
14	Wales	6	2
15	Switzerland	6	2
16	Scotland	6	1

Source: UEFA

League B
Rnk	Team	Pld	Pts
17	Poland	6	16
18	Slovenia	6	15
19	Serbia	6	14
20	Ukraine	6	13
21	Republic of Ireland	6	15
22	Czech Republic	6	13
23	Finland	6	11
24	Northern Ireland	6	8
25	Albania	6	6
26	Turkey	6	6
27	Bosnia and Herzegovina	6	5
28	Hungary	6	4
29	Romania	6	4
30	Belarus	6	3
31	Croatia	6	3
32	Greece	6	0

Source: UEFA

League C (Note: Due to differing group sizes in League C, results against fourth-placed teams are not considered when comparing teams placed first, second, and third in their respective groups.)
Rnk	Team	Pld	Pts
33	Slovakia	4	12
34	Israel	4	10
35	Luxembourg	4	10
36	Malta	4	9
37	Montenegro	4	8
38	Latvia	4	8
39	Cyprus	4	9
40	Kosovo	4	7
41	Azerbaijan	4	5
42	Faroe Islands	4	4
43	Kazakhstan	4	4
44	Estonia	4	4
45	Lithuania	4	3
46	Armenia	4	3
47	Bulgaria	4	2
48	Moldova	4	1
49	North Macedonia	4	1
50	Georgia	4	0
51	Andorra	6	5
52	Liechtenstein	6	1
53	Gibraltar	6	0

Source: UEFA

=== Overall phase rankings ===
After the conclusion of the promotion/relegation play-offs, the overall league rankings were adjusted according to the ranking criteria to establish the UEFA Women's Nations League overall phase rankings, which were used to determine the starting positions and seeding of the teams in Women's World Cup 2027 qualifying.

Key
▲	Promoted after the season
▼	Relegated after the season
*	Participated in promotion/relegation play-offs

2027 League A participants
Rnk	Team	P
1	France	
2	Germany	
3	Spain	
4	Sweden	
5	Netherlands	
6	England	
7	Italy	
8	Norway	
9	Denmark	*
10	Austria	*
11	Iceland	*
12	Poland	▲
13	Slovenia	▲
14	Serbia	▲
15	Ukraine	▲
16	Republic of Ireland	▲*

Source: UEFA

2027 League B participants
Rnk	Team	P/R
17	Belgium	▼*
18	Portugal	▼
19	Wales	▼
20	Switzerland	▼
21	Scotland	▼
22	Czech Republic	*
23	Finland	*
24	Northern Ireland	*
25	Albania	*
26	Turkey	*
27	Slovakia	▲
28	Israel	▲
29	Luxembourg	▲
30	Malta	▲
31	Montenegro	▲
32	Latvia	▲

Source: UEFA

2027 League C participants
Rnk	Team	R
33	Bosnia and Herzegovina	▼
34	Hungary	▼
35	Romania	▼
36	Belarus	▼
37	Croatia	▼
38	Greece	▼
39	Cyprus	*
40	Kosovo	*
41	Azerbaijan	
42	Faroe Islands	
43	Kazakhstan	
44	Estonia	
45	Lithuania	
46	Armenia	
47	Bulgaria	
48	Moldova	
49	North Macedonia	
50	Georgia	
51	Andorra	
52	Liechtenstein	
53	Gibraltar	

Source: UEFA

== Top goalscorers ==
There were 514 goals scored in 166 matches, for an average of 3.1 goals per match.

8 goals

- (Belgium women's national football team) Tessa Wullaert
- (Spain women's national football team) Clàudia Pina

7 goals

- (Cyprus women's national football team) Antri Violari

6 goals

- (Luxembourg women's national football team) Amy Thompson
- (Slovakia women's national football team) Tamara Morávková

5 goals

- (Albania women's national football team) Fortesa Berisha
- (Albania women's national football team) Megi Doçi
- (Czech Republic women's national football team) Kateřina Svitková
- (Denmark women's national football team) Pernille Harder
- (France women's national football team) Sandy Baltimore
- (Germany women's national football team) Lea Schüller
- (Slovakia women's national football team) Nikola Rybanská
- (Slovenia women's national football team) Zara Kramžar
- (Spain women's national football team) Alexia Putellas
- (Turkey women's national football team) Kader Hançar

4 goals

- (Andorra women's national football team) Teresa Morató
- (Bosnia and Herzegovina women's national football team) Sofija Krajšumović
- (Czech Republic women's national football team) Michaela Khýrová
- (England women's national football team) Aggie Beever-Jones
- (Faroe Islands women's national football team) Ásla Johannesen
- (France women's national football team) Clara Mateo
- (Germany women's national football team) Selina Cerci
- (Iceland women's national football team) Karólína Vilhjálmsdóttir
- (Kosovo women's national football team) Kaltrina Biqkaj
- (Poland women's national football team) Ewa Pajor
- (Slovakia women's national football team) Patrícia Hmírová
- (Slovenia women's national football team) Lara Prašnikar
- (Spain women's national football team) Esther González
- (Sweden women's national football team) Stina Blackstenius

3 goals

- (Armenia women's national football team) Narine Davtyan
- (Armenia women's national football team) Lara Kazanchian
- (Czech Republic women's national football team) Eva Bartoňová
- (Denmark women's national football team) Sara Holmgaard
- (Faroe Islands women's national football team) Heidi Sevdal
- (Finland women's national football team) Linda Sällström
- (Germany women's national football team) Klara Bühl
- (Germany women's national football team) Laura Freigang
- (Germany women's national football team) Giovanna Hoffmann
- (Israel women's national football team) Talia Sommer
- (Italy women's national football team) Cristiana Girelli
- (Kazakhstan women's national football team) Karina Berikova
- (Kazakhstan women's national football team) Amina Bibossynova
- (Latvia women's national football team) Karlīna Miksone
- (Luxembourg women's national football team) Caroline Jorge
- (Luxembourg women's national football team) Laura Miller
- (Malta women's national football team) Haley Bugeja
- (Montenegro women's national football team) Armisa Kuč
- (Netherlands women's national football team) Lineth Beerensteyn
- (Northern Ireland women's national football team) Simone Magill
- (Poland women's national football team) Adriana Achcińska
- (Poland women's national football team) Paulina Tomasiak
- (Serbia women's national football team) Nina Matejić
- (Slovakia women's national football team) Klaudia Fabová
- (Sweden women's national football team) Filippa Angeldahl
- (Ukraine women's national football team) Olha Ovdiychuk

Below are goalscorers lists for all leagues, promotion/relegation matches, and finals:

- League A
- League B
- League C
- Promotion/relegation
- Finals
