= 2024 UEFA Women's Nations League final =

Football match in Seville, Spain

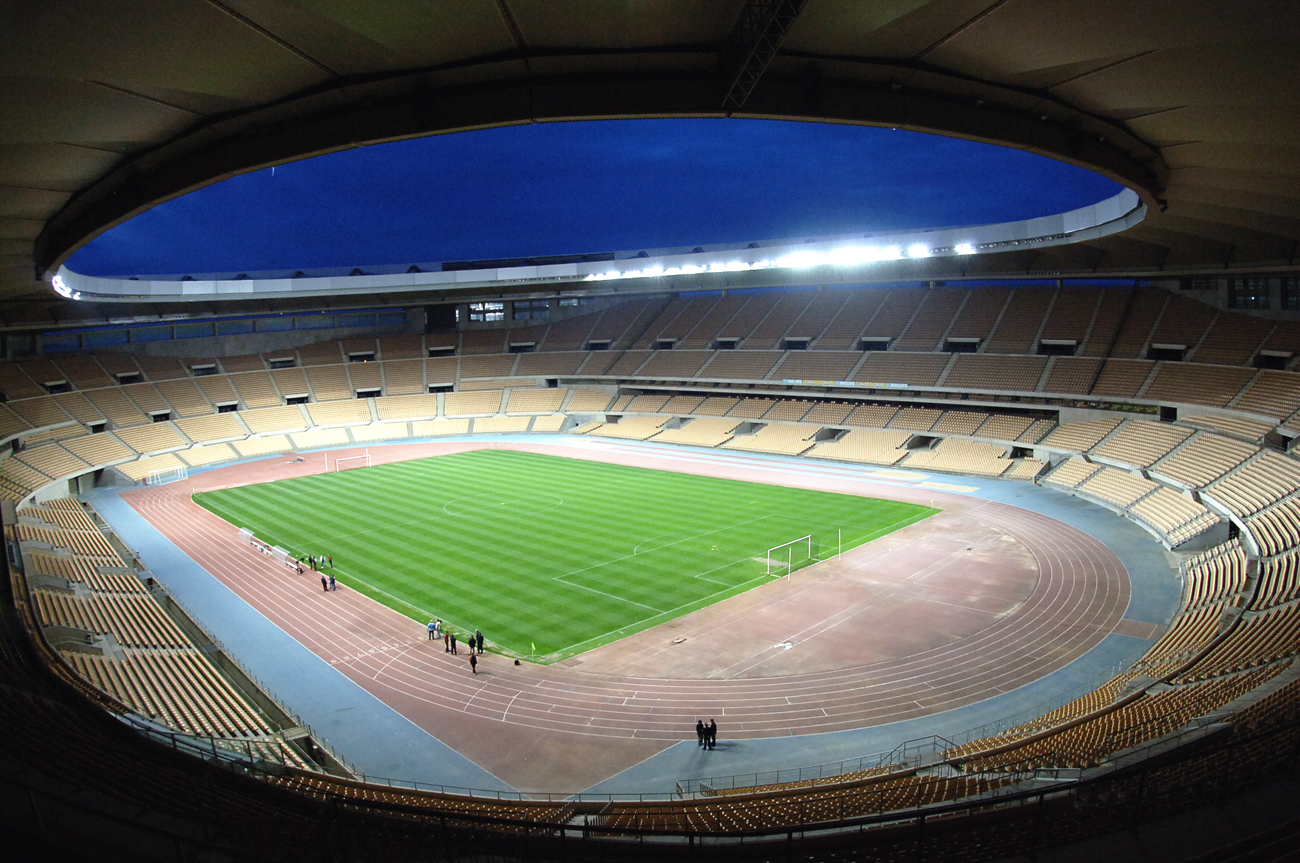
- Estadio de La Cartuja in Seville hosted the final.
- Event: 2024 UEFA Women's Nations League Finals
Spain	France
2	0
- Date: 28 February 2024
- Venue: La Cartuja, Seville
- Referee: Tess Olofsson (Sweden)
- Attendance: 32,657

The 2024 UEFA Women's Nations League final was a football match that determined the winners of the final tournament of the 2023–24 UEFA Women's Nations League. It was the first final of the international football competition involving the women's national teams of the member associations of UEFA. The match was held on 28 February 2024 at the Estadio de La Cartuja in Seville, Spain, and was contested by France and Spain.

The final also determined which teams would join hosts France in the 2024 Summer Olympics. Normally, the two finalists qualify for the tournament, but because France reached the final, Spain took one qualification spot and the winner of the third place match between Netherlands and Germany determined the other qualification spot.

Spain won the match 2–0 for their first UEFA Nations League title.

== Route to the final ==
Note: In all results below, the score of the finalist is given first (H: home; A: away).

France
Round
Spain
Opponents
Result
League phase
Opponents
Result
Portugal
2–0 (H)
Match 1
Sweden
3–2 (A)
Austria
1–0 (A)
Match 2
Switzerland
5–0 (H)
Norway
2–1 (A)
Match 3
Italy
1–0 (A)
Norway
0–0 (H)
Match 4
Switzerland
7–1 (A)
Austria
3–0 (H)
Match 5
Italy
2–3 (H)
Portugal
1–0 (A)
Match 6
Sweden
5–3 (H)
Group A2 winner

Pos	Team	Pld	Pts	(France)	(Austria)	(Norway)	(Portugal)
1	France	6	16	—	3–0	0–0	2–0
2	Austria	6	10	0–1	—	2–1	2–1
3	Norway (O)	6	5	1–2	1–1	—	4–0
4	Portugal (R)	6	3	0–1	1–2	3–2	—

Source: UEFA
(O) Play-off winners; (R) Relegated
Final standings
Group A4 winner

Pos	Team	Pld	Pts	(Spain)	(Italy)	(Sweden)	(Switzerland)
1	Spain	6	15	—	2–3	5–3	5–0
2	Italy	6	10	0–1	—	0–1	3–0
3	Sweden (O)	6	7	2–3	1–1	—	1–0
4	Switzerland (R)	6	3	1–7	0–1	1–0	—

Source: UEFA
(O) Play-off winners; (R) Relegated
Opponents
Result
Nations League Finals
Opponents
Result
Germany
2–1 (H)
Semi-finals
Netherlands
3–0 (H)

== Match ==
=== Details ===
28 February 2024
19:00

Spain	2–0	France
Bonmatí 32'; Caldentey 53'	Report

La Cartuja, Seville
Attendance: 32,657
Referee: Tess Olofsson (Sweden)

Spain	France

GK	13	Cata Coll
RB	2	Ona Batlle
CB	4	Irene Paredes (c)
CB	16	Laia Codina
LB	19	Olga Carmona	(substituted off) 68'
CM	6	Aitana Bonmatí
CM	14	Laia Aleixandri
CM	10	Jennifer Hermoso
RF	22	Athenea del Castillo
CF	7	Salma Paralluelo
LF	8	Mariona Caldentey
Substitutions:
DF	12	Oihane Hernández	(substituted on) 68'
FW	15	Eva Navarro	(substituted on) 72'
FW	21	Vicky López	(substituted on) 85'
Manager:
Montse Tomé

GK	16	Pauline Peyraud-Magnin
RB	5	Élisa De Almeida
CB	2	Maëlle Lakrar
CB	19	Griedge Mbock Bathy
LB	7	Sakina Karchaoui
CM	6	Amandine Henry	(substituted off) 58'
CM	8	Grace Geyoro
RW	11	Kadidiatou Diani	(substituted off) 76'
AM	9	Eugénie Le Sommer (c)
LW	13	Selma Bacha	(substituted off) 76'
CF	18	Marie-Antoinette Katoto	(substituted off) 58'
Substitutions:
MF	15	Kenza Dali	(substituted on) 58'
FW	20	Delphine Cascarino	(substituted on) 58'
MF	10	Amel Majri	(substituted on) 76'
MF	3	Julie Dufour	(substituted on) 76'
Manager:
Hervé Renard

Assistant referees:
Almira Spahić (Sweden)
Francesca Di Monte (Italy)
Fourth official:
Iuliana Demetrescu (Romania)
Video assistant referee:
Rob Dieperink (Netherlands)
Assistant video assistant referee:
Katrin Rafalski (Germany)

Match rules

- 90 minutes
- 30 minutes of extra time if necessary
- Penalty shoot-out if scores still level
- Maximum of twelve named substitutes
- Maximum of five substitutions, with a sixth allowed in extra time (Note: Each team was given only three opportunities to make substitutions, with a fourth opportunity in extra time, excluding substitutions made at half-time, before the start of extra time and at half-time in extra time.)
