= Nicole Anyomi =

German footballer (born 2000)

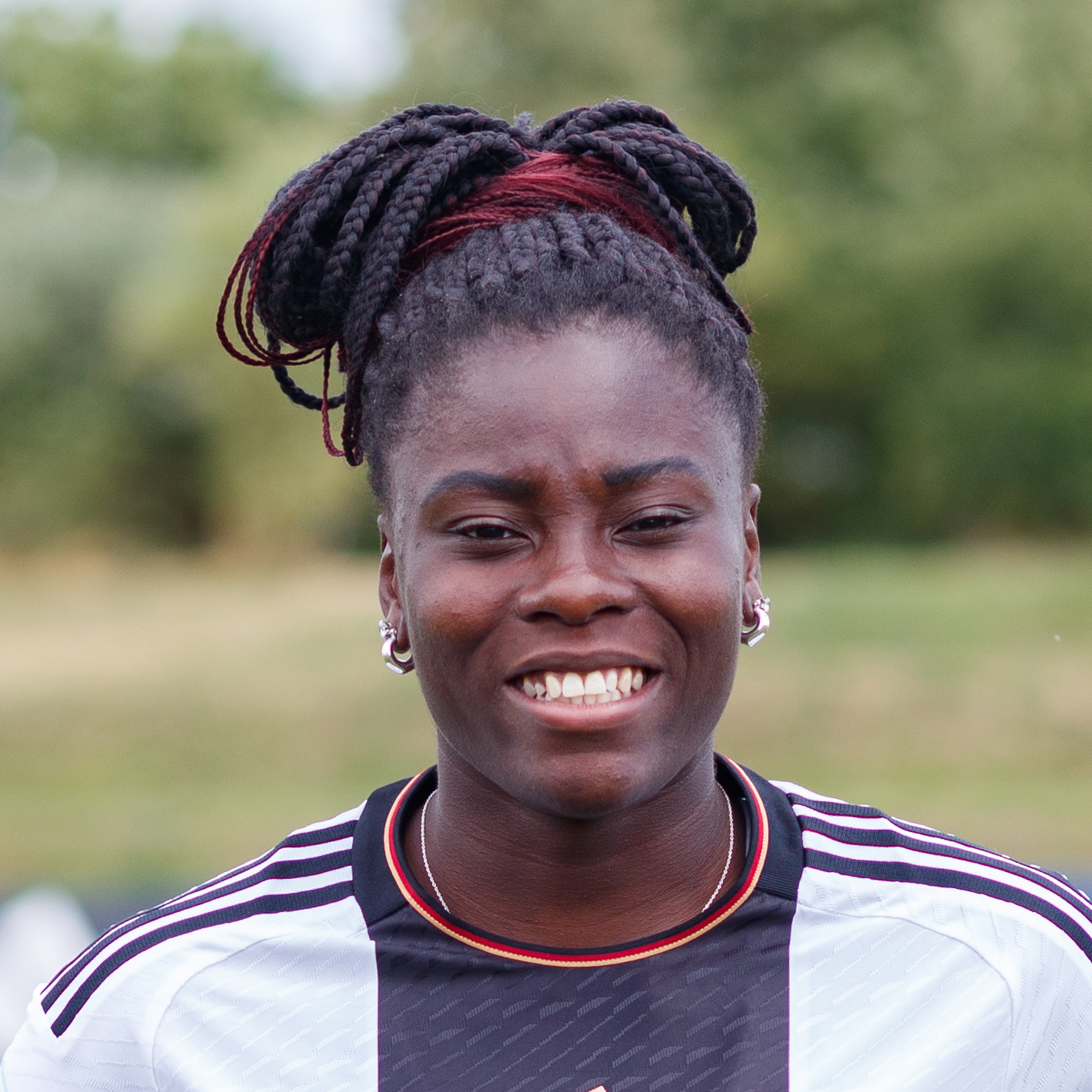
- Anyomi with Germany in 2023

Personal information
- Full name: Etonam-Nicole Anyomi
- Date of birth: 10 February 2000 (age 26)
- Place of birth: Krefeld, Germany
- Height: 1.70 m (5 ft 7 in)
- Position: Forward

Team information
- Current team: London City Lionesses
- Number: 19

Youth career
- 2012–2014: Borussia Mönchengladbach
- 2014–2017: SGS Essen

Senior career*
Years	Team	Apps	(Gls)
2016–2021	SGS Essen	72	(14)
2021–2026	Eintracht Frankfurt	101	(50)
2026–	London City Lionesses	8	(1)

International career^{‡}
2014–2015	Germany U15	4	(4)
2015–2016	Germany U16	9	(7)
2016–2017	Germany U17	20	(17)
2018–2019	Germany U19	22	(5)
2021–	Germany	36	(4)
Medal record
Olympic Games
Bronze medal – third place	2024 Paris	Team
UEFA Women's Championship
Silver medal – second place	2022 England
- * Club domestic league appearances and goals as of 21 November 2026 ‡ National team caps and goals as of 21:15, 13 October 2026 (UTC)

Etonam-Nicole Anyomi (born 10 February 2000) is a German professional footballer who plays as a forward for Women's Super League club London City Lionesses and the Germany national team.

== Club career ==
Anyomi started her career in the youth team at SuS Krefeld and moved via Borussia Mönchengladbach to the B youth team at SGS Essen in the summer of 2014, for which she played in the B junior Bundesliga. In the summer of 2016, the striker was promoted to the Essen Bundesliga squad and was in the professional squad for the first time on 11 September 2016 against TSG 1899 Hoffenheim. On 15 October 2016, Anyomi made her Bundesliga debut against 1. FFC Turbine Potsdam after coming on as a substitute for Kozue Ando.

In January 2020, she extended her contract with SGS Essen. During the 2019–20 DFB Cup final against VfL Wolfsburg, Anyomi suffered a fractured coccyx and was absent from SGS Essen for a long time.

Anyomi signed with Eintracht Frankfurt for the 2021–22 season. She signed a three-year contract until 30 June 2024.

On 2 July 2026, Anyomi signed a four year contract with the Women's Super League club London City Lionesses.

== International career ==
Anyomi was first invited to a screening course for the U15 national team in September 2014 and made her debut in the national jersey on 28 October 2014 in the 13-0 win in a friendly against Scotland, where she scored the third goal. After making her debut for the U16 national team in September 2015, she took second place at the Nordic Cup with this national team in the summer of 2016 . At the end of September 2016, she played her first game for the U17 national team as part of a four-nation tournament against Romania.

She was called up to the senior national team squad for the first time for a game against England, which was scheduled to take place on 27 October 2020. However, the game was canceled at short notice by the English association due to a positive corona test by a member of the support staff. On 21 February 2021 she came on as a substitute for Klara Bühl in the 61st minute of the friendly match against Belgium for her first senior international match. The home game finished as a 2–0 win for Germany.

National coach Martina Voss-Tecklenburg had named Anyomi in the squad for the Euro 2022. She scored her first international goal on 16 July 2022, in Germany's 3–0 group stage win over Finland. The German team reached the final, but lost to England and became European runners-up. Anyomi played in two games.

Anyomi was called back into the squad for the 2023 World Cup and played in all three games before Germany was eliminated in the preliminary round.

On 3 July 2024, Anyomi was called up to the Germany squad for the 2024 Summer Olympics.

== Personal life ==
Anyomi was born in Krefeld to a Ghanaian mother and a Togolese father.

== Career statistics ==
=== Club ===
As of match played 21 November 2026

Appearances and goals by club, season and competition
Club	Season	League			National cup (Note: Includes DFB-Pokal)		League cup (Note: Includes FA Women's League Cup)		Continental (Note: Includes UEFA Women's Champions League)		Total	
Club	Season	Division	Apps	Goals	Apps	Goals	Apps	Goals	Apps	Goals	Apps	Goals
SGS Essen	2016–17	Frauen-Bundesliga	8	3	1	0	—		—		9	3
SGS Essen	2017–18	Frauen-Bundesliga	17	2	3	1	—		—		20	3
SGS Essen	2018–19	Frauen-Bundesliga	15	1	2	2	—		—		17	3
SGS Essen	2019–20	Frauen-Bundesliga	21	4	5	2	—		—		26	6
SGS Essen	2020–21	Frauen-Bundesliga	11	4	1	2	—		—		12	6
SGS Essen	Total		72	14	12	7	0	0	0	0	84	21
Eintracht Frankfurt	2021–22	Frauen-Bundesliga	17	4	1	0	—		2	1	20	5
Eintracht Frankfurt	2022–23	Frauen-Bundesliga	20	8	2	0	—		2	0	24	8
Eintracht Frankfurt	2023–24	Frauen-Bundesliga	19	11	3	1	—		9	2	31	14
Eintracht Frankfurt	2024–25	Frauen-Bundesliga	22	14	3	1	—		1	0	26	15
Eintracht Frankfurt	2025–26	Frauen-Bundesliga	23	13	2	3	—		5	4	30	20
Eintracht Frankfurt	Total		101	50	11	5	0	0	19	7	131	62
London City Lionesses	2026–27	Women's Super League	8	1	0	0	3	1	0	0	11	2
Career total			181	65	23	12	3	1	19	7	226	85

=== International ===
As of match played 13 October 2026

Appearances and goals by national team and year
National team	Year	Apps	Goals
Germany	2021	2	0
Germany	2022	13	1
Germany	2023	8	1
Germany	2024	4	0
Germany	2025	4	1
Germany	2026	5	1
Total		36	4

Scores and results list Germany's goal tally first, score column indicates score after each Anyomi goal.

List of international goals scored by Nicole Anyomi
No.	Date	Venue	Opponent	Score	Result	Competition
1	16 July 2022	Milton Keynes, England	Finland	3–0	3–0	UEFA Women's Euro 2022
2	27 October 2023	Sinsheim, Germany	Wales	5–1	5–1	2023–24 UEFA Women's Nations League A
3	28 October 2025	Caen, France	France	1–1	2–2	2025 UEFA Women's Nations League Finals
4	14 April 2026	Nuremberg, Germany	Austria	1–0	5–1	2027 FIFA World Cup qualification

== Honours ==
Germany

- Summer Olympics bronze medal: 2024
- UEFA European Championship runner-up: 2022

Individual

- Silbernes Lorbeerblatt: 2024
