= Giovanna Hoffmann =

German footballer

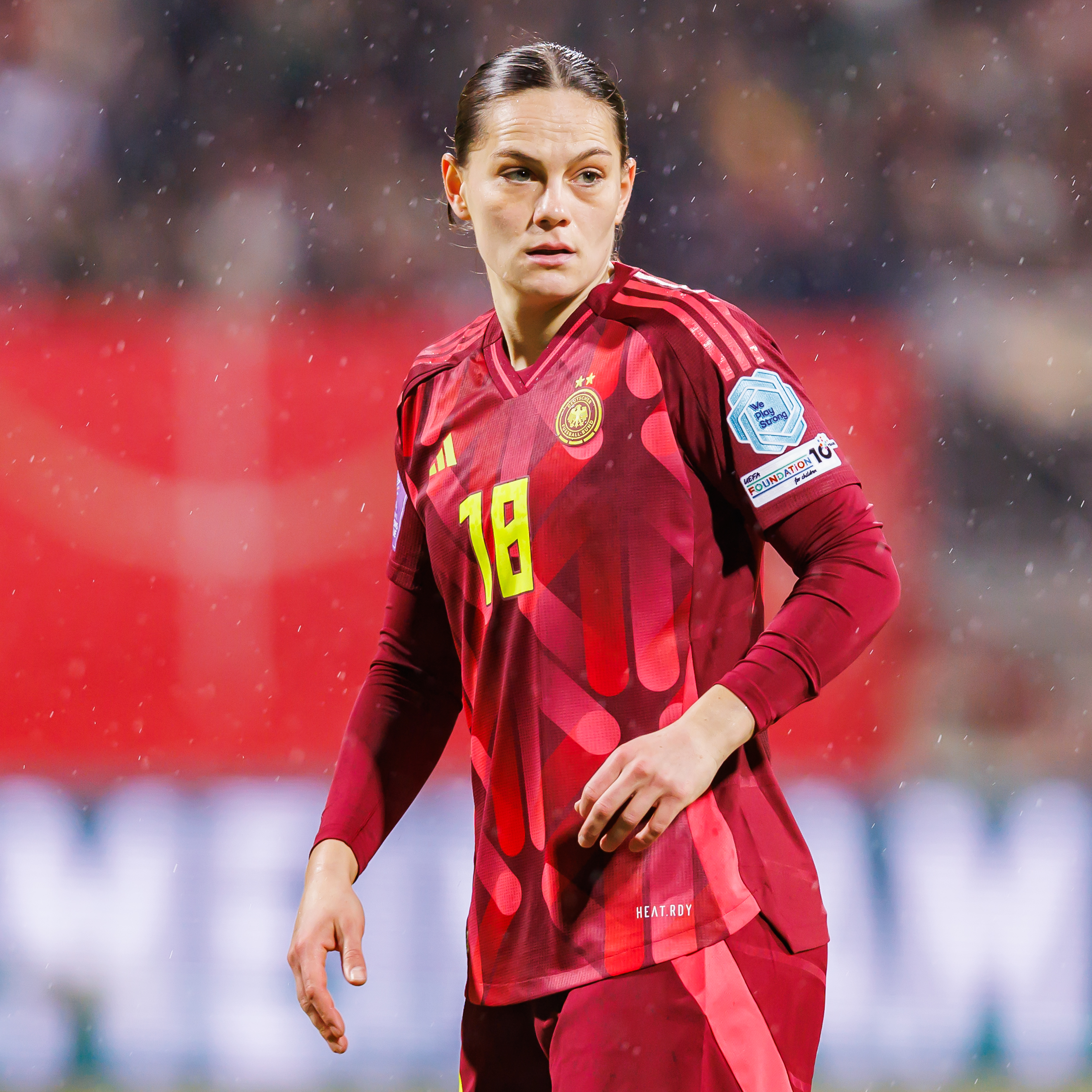
- Hoffmann with Germany in 2025

Personal information
- Date of birth: 20 September 1998 (age 28)
- Place of birth: Bremerhaven, Germany
- Height: 1.74 m (5 ft 9 in)
- Position: Forward

Team information
- Current team: VfL Wolfsburg
- Number: 7

Youth career
- –2012: SC Lehe-Spaden
- 2012–2015: Werder Bremen

Senior career*
Years	Team	Apps	(Gls)
2014–2020	Werder Bremen	57	(23)
2016–2017	Werder Bremen II	4	(4)
2020–2024	SC Freiburg	65	(5)
2024–2026	RB Leipzig	26	(13)
2026–	VfL Wolfsburg	0	(0)

International career^{‡}
2013–2014	Germany U16	7	(3)
2014–2015	Germany U17	8	(1)
2017	Germany U19	6	(0)
2024–	Germany	12	(3)
- * Club domestic league appearances and goals as of 19:10, 5 July 2026 (UTC) ‡ National team caps and goals as of 18:46, 24 July 2025 (UTC)

Giovanna Hoffmann (born 20 September 1998) is a German professional footballer who plays as a forward for Frauen-Bundesliga club VfL Wolfsburg and the Germany national team. She has previously played for Werder Bremen, SC Freiburg, and RB Leipzig.

== Club career ==
Hoffmann began her career playing for the local sports club SC Lehe-Spaden. In 2012, she joined the youth setup of Werder Bremen. In October 2014 she made her debut in the senior team. After missing the whole 2015–16 season due to an ankle fracture, she made her comeback in September 2016 to win that season's second-tier championship with Bremen, which meant the promotion to the Bundesliga. From March 2018 on she had to pause again due to ongoing health problems.

In February 2020, her transfer to SC Freiburg to the upcoming season was announced. However, from October 2020 on, she again missed several months due to a ruptured cruciate ligament. Her biggest success with Freiburg was to reach the final of the 2022–23 cup competition.

In the summer of 2024, she joined RB Leipzig.

On 3 March 2026, it was announced that Hoffmann would be joining VfL Wolfsburg on a three-year contract ahead of the 2026–27 season.

== International career ==
A former youth international for Germany, Hoffmann made her debut for the German senior team on 25 October 2024 in a 4–3 friendly win against England. On 12 June 2025, Hoffmann was called up to the Germany squad for the UEFA Women's Euro 2025.

== Career statistics ==
As of 23 July 2025

Appearances and goals by national team and year
National team	Year	Apps	Goals
Germany	2024	2	0
Germany	2025	10	3
Total		12	3

Scores and results list Germany's goal tally first, score column indicates score after each Hoffmann goal.

List of international goals scored by Giovanna Hoffmann
No.	Date	Venue	Opponent	Score	Result	Competition
1	25 February 2025	Max-Morlock-Stadion, Nuremberg, Germany	Austria	3–1	4–1	2025 UEFA Nations League
2	8 April 2025	Volkswagen Arena, Wolfsburg, Germany	Scotland	3–1	6–1	2025 UEFA Nations League
3	8 April 2025	Volkswagen Arena, Wolfsburg, Germany	Scotland	4–1	6–1	2025 UEFA Nations League

== Honours ==
Werder Bremen

- 2. Frauen-Bundesliga Nord: 2016–17
