= Beatriz Fonseca =

Portuguese footballer

Personal information
- Full name: Beatriz Pina Fonseca
- Date of birth: 15 September 1998 (age 28)
- Place of birth: Guarda, Portugal
- Height: 1.57 m (5 ft 2 in)
- Position: Midfielder

Team information
- Current team: Marseille
- Number: 18

Senior career*
Years	Team	Apps	(Gls)
2019-2021	Apollon Ladies F.C.	34	(9)
2021-2022	Apollon Ladies F.C.	3	
2022-2024	S.C. Braga	59	(20)
2024-2026	Sporting CP	51	(2)
2026-	Marseille		

International career
2024-	Portugal	1	(0)
- * Club domestic league appearances and goals

Beatriz Pina Fonseca (born 15 September 1998) is a Portuguese professional footballer who played as a defender for Première Ligue club Marseille and the Portugal women's national football team.

== International career ==
Fonseca was part of Portugal's 23-player squad that participated in the UEFA Women's Euro 2025 in Switzerland.
