= Iuliana Demetrescu =

Romanian football referee (born 1990)

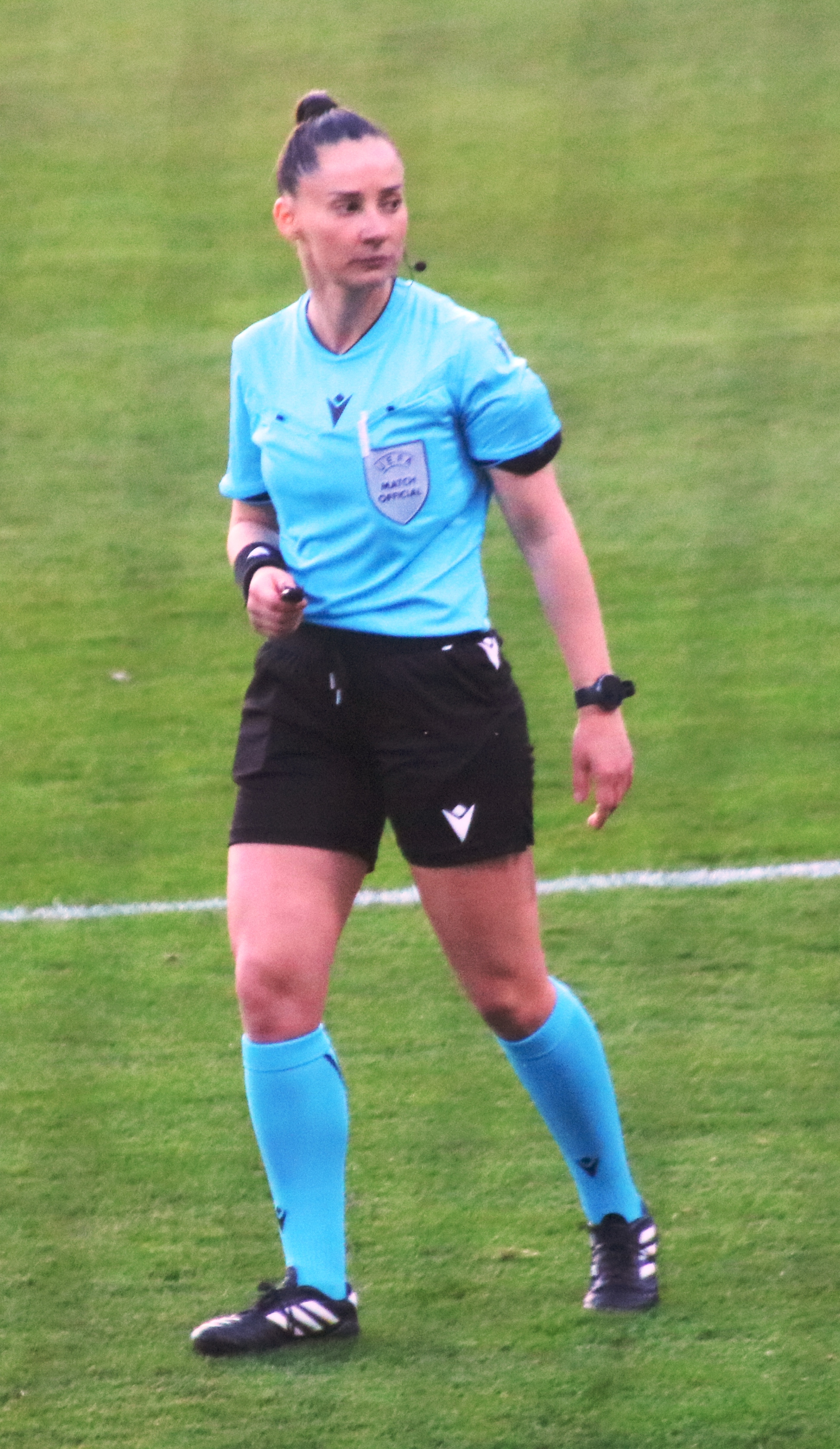
- Born: 10 January 1990 (age 36)

Domestic
Years	League	Role

International
Years	League	Role
2016–	FIFA listed	Referee

Iuliana Elena Demetrescu (born 10 January 1990) is a Romanian international football referee. She has been an international football referee since 2016.

Demetrescu is a referee in Liga I, the top division for club football in Romania.

Demetrescu was appointed to be a referee at the UEFA Women's Euro 2022 in England.

Demetrescu was appointed to be a Fourth Official at the 2026 UEFA Women's Europa Cup final in Leg 1 And 2026 UEFA Women's Champions League final

Iuliana Demetrescu officiating the first leg of the final in 2025 UEFA Women's Nations League between Germany and Spain at Fritz-Walter-Stadion at Kaiserslautern on 28 November 2025 .

== International career ==
Demetrescu has officiated at several major international tournaments. She was appointed to the UEFA Women's Euro 2022 in England and the UEFA Women's Euro 2025 in Switzerland. She also refereed at the FIFA Women's World Cup 2023 in Australia and New Zealand, the FIFA U-20 Women's World Cup 2024 in Colombia, and the FIFA U-17 Women's World Cup 2022 in India, where she officiated a semifinal. In 2024, she was appointed to referee the semi-final of the UEFA Women's Champions League. She was also appointed to officiate the final of the UEFA Women's Nations League in 2025, officiating the first leg of the final between Germany and Spain.

== Major tournaments ==
- UEFA Women's Euro 2022 England
- FIFA Women's World Cup 2023 Australia and New Zealand
- FIFA U-17 Women's World Cup 2022 – Semi-final India
- FIFA U-20 Women's World Cup 2024 Colombia
- UEFA Women's Champions League 2024 – Semi-final
- UEFA Women's Nations League 2025 – Final
- UEFA Women's Euro 2025 Switzerland
