= Silvia Gasperotti =

Italian association football referee

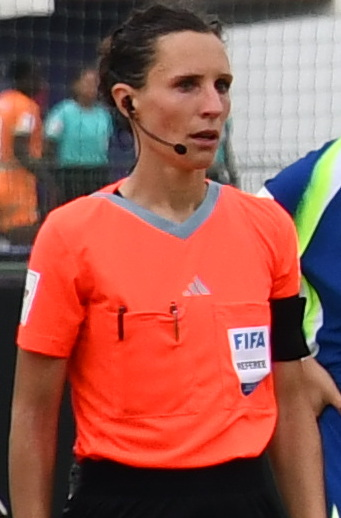
- Gasperotti at 2025 FIFA U-17 Women's World Cup
- Born: 6 March 1993 (age 33); Italy

Domestic
| Years | League | Role |

International
| Years | League | Role |
| 2022- | FIFA listed | Referee |

Silvia Gasperotti (born 6 March 1993) is an Italian association football referee.

== Career ==
Gasperotti comes from the Rovereto referee section and officiates matches in Serie A Femminile.

Since 2022, Gasperotti has been on the FIFA list of referees and has officiated international football matches. Since the second half of the 2024–25 season, she has been a member of the UEFA Elite Referees group, the highest category for female referees.

Gasperotti has officiated, among other matches, in the UEFA Women's Under-17 European Championship qualifiers, the FIFA Women's World Cup qualifiers, and the UEFA Women's Champions League qualifiers.

On 31 March 2025, UEFA announced that she was selected as a match official in the Women's Euro's over the summer.
