= 2024 UEFA Women's Nations League Finals =

Tournament details
- Host countries: France (Note: France hosted their semi-final match against Germany.); Netherlands (Note: Netherlands hosted their third place play-off against Germany.); Spain (Note: Spain hosted their semi-final match against the Netherlands and the final against France.)
- Dates: 23–28 February
- Teams: 4
- Venues: 3 (in 3 host cities)

Final positions
- Champions: Spain (1st title)
- Runners-up: France
- Third place: Germany
- Fourth place: Netherlands

Tournament statistics
- Matches played: 4
- Goals scored: 10 (2.5 per match)
- Attendance: 105,908 (26,477 per match)
- Top scorer(s): (Spain) Aitana Bonmatí (2 goals)
- Best player: (Spain) Aitana Bonmatí

The 2024 UEFA Women's Nations League Finals was the final tournament of the 2023–24 edition of the UEFA Women's Nations League, the inaugural season of the international football competition involving the women's national teams of the 55 member associations of UEFA. The tournament consisted of two semi-finals, a third place play-off, and a final to determine the inaugural champions of the UEFA Women's Nations League and the two teams that would qualify for the 2024 Summer Olympics alongside France.

== Format ==
The Nations League Finals took place in February 2024 and were contested by the four group winners of League A.

The competition was in a knockout format, consisting of two semi-finals, a third place play-off, and a final. The semi-final pairings and the administrative home teams for the third place play-off and final were determined using an open draw on 11 December 2023.

The tournament took place over five days, with the semi-finals on 23 February, and the third place play-off and final on 28 February.

The Nations League Finals were played in single-leg knockout matches. If the scores were level at the end of normal time, 30 minutes of extra time were played, and if still level a penalty shoot-out would decide the winner.

== Qualified teams ==
The four group winners of League A qualified for the Nations League Finals.

Group	Winners	Date of qualification	UNL ranking December 2023	FIFA ranking December 2023
A1	Netherlands	5 December 2023	4	7
A2	France	1 December 2023	1	3
A3	Germany	5 December 2023	3	6
A4	Spain	1 December 2023	2	1

== Venues ==
On 11 December 2023, the draw for the semi-final pairings and hosts for the final and third-place matches took place in Nyon. Spain was drawn to host Netherlands in one semi-final, and France was drawn to host Germany in the other. The winner of the Spain–Netherlands match would host the final, while the loser of the Spain–Netherlands match would host the third place match.

Spain	France	Netherlands
Seville	Décines-Charpieu (Lyon Area)	Heerenveen
Estadio La Cartuja	Parc Olympique Lyonnais	Abe Lenstra Stadion
Capacity: 57,619	Capacity: 59,186	Capacity: 27,224
2024 UEFA Women's Nations League Finals is located in Europe

== Squads ==
Each national team had to submit a squad of 23 players, three of whom had to be goalkeepers, at least ten days before the opening match of the tournament. If a player became injured or ill severely enough to prevent her participation in the tournament before her team's first match, she could be replaced by another player.

== Bracket ==
Semi-finals
23 February 2024 – Seville
Spain	3
Netherlands	0
23 February 2024 – Décines-Charpieu
France	2
Germany	1

Final
28 February 2024 – Seville
Spain	2
France	0
Third place play-off
28 February 2024 – Heerenveen
Netherlands	0
Germany	2

== Semi-finals ==
=== Spain vs Netherlands ===
23 February 2024
21:00

Spain	3–0	Netherlands
Hermoso 41'; Bonmatí 45'; Batlle 77'	Report

La Cartuja, Seville
Attendance: 21,856
Referee: Rebecca Welch (England)

=== France vs Germany ===
23 February 2024
21:00

France	2–1	Germany
Diani 41'; Karchaoui 45+4' (pen.)	Report	Gwinn 82' (pen.)

Parc Olympique Lyonnais, Décines-Charpieu
Attendance: 30,267
Referee: Esther Staubli (Switzerland)

== Third place play-off ==
Because France, who qualified automatically as hosts of the Olympics reached the final, the third place playoff determined the second team to qualify for the Olympics alongside Spain.

28 February 2024
20:45

Netherlands	0–2	Germany
	Report	Bühl 66'; Schüller 78'

Abe Lenstra Stadion, Heerenveen
Attendance: 21,128
Referee: Stéphanie Frappart (France)

== Final ==
28 February 2024
19:00

Spain	2–0	France
Bonmatí 32'; Caldentey 53'	Report

Estadio de La Cartuja, Seville
Attendance: 32,657
Referee: Tess Olofsson (Sweden)

== Statistics ==
=== Goalscorers ===
There were 10 goals scored in 4 matches, for an average of 2.5 goals per match.

2 goals

- (Spain) Aitana Bonmatí

1 goal

- (France) Kadidiatou Diani
- (France) Sakina Karchaoui
- (Germany) Klara Bühl
- (Germany) Giulia Gwinn
- (Germany) Lea Schüller
- (Spain) Ona Batlle
- (Spain) Mariona Caldentey
- (Spain) Jenni Hermoso

== Qualified teams for the 2024 Summer Olympics ==
The following three teams from UEFA qualified for the 2024 Summer Olympic women's football tournament, including France, who qualified as the hosts.

Team	Qualified as	Qualified on	Previous appearances in Summer Olympics (Note: Bold indicates champions for that year.)
France	Hosts	13 September 2017	2 (2012, 2016)
Spain	Nations League finalist	23 February 2024	0 (debut)
Germany	Nations League third place play-off winner (Note: The two Nations League finalists would qualify for the Olympics. As France was one of the finalists, the other spot was awarded to the winner of the third place play-off.)	28 February 2024	5 (1996, 2000, 2004, 2008, 2016)
