= Wales women's national football team results (2020–present) =

- Win Draw Loss

This is a list of the 59 Wales women's national football team results and scheduled fixtures from 2020 to the present.

== Fixtures and results ==
=== 2020 ===
6 March 2020 Friendly	Wales	2–0	Estonia	Wrexham, Wales
19:00 (UTC±0)	Wynne 69'; Lawrence 76'	Report		Stadium: Racecourse Ground; Attendance: 2,015; Referee: Lorraine Watson (Scotland)

22 September 2020 UEFA Women's Euro 2021 qualifying	Norway	1–0	Wales	Oslo, Norway
17:00 UTC+2	Reiten 29'	Report		Stadium: Ullevaal Stadion; Referee: Petra Pavlíková (Slovakia)

22 October 2020 UEFA Women's Euro 2021 qualifying	Wales	4–0	Faroe Islands	Newport
16:30 UTC+1	Ward 33'; Harding 58', 61'; Woodham 67'	Report		Stadium: Rodney Parade; Referee: Vesna Budimir (Croatia)

26 October 2020 UEFA Women's Euro 2021 qualifying	Wales	0–1	Norway	Newport, Wales
16:30 UTC+0		Report	Maanum 61'	Stadium: Rodney Parade; Referee: Lina Lehtovaara (Finland)

30 November 2020 UEFA Women's Euro 2021 qualifying	Wales	3–0	Belarus	Newport, Wales
19:10 UTC+0	Harding 15'; Rowe 34'; Fishlock 72' (pen.)	Report		Stadium: Rodney Parade; Referee: Désirée Grundbacher (Switzerland)

=== 2021 ===
9 April 2021 Friendly	Wales	0–3	Canada	Cardiff, Wales
18:00 UTC+1		Report	Rose 25'; Viens 59'; Fleming 63'	Stadium: Cardiff International Sports Stadium; Referee: Kirsty Dowie (England)

13 April 2021 Friendly	Wales	1–1	Denmark	Cardiff, Wales
19:15 UTC+1	Fishlock 60'	Report	Harder 24'	Stadium: Cardiff City Stadium; Referee: Stacey Pearson (England)

15 Jun 2021 Friendly	Wales	0–1	Scotland	Llanelli, Wales
19:15 UTC+1		Report	Cuthbert 58'	Stadium: Parc y Scarlets

17 September 2021 2023 FIFA Women's World Cup qualification – UEFA Group I	Wales	6–0	Kazakhstan	Llanelli, Wales
19:15 UTC+1	K. Green 17', 71'; Harding 30'; Rowe 54'; Evans 90+1'; Holland 90+3'	Report		Stadium: Parc y Scarlets; Attendance: 1,745; Referee: Monika Mularczyk (Poland)

21 September 2021 2023 FIFA Women's World Cup qualification – UEFA Group I	Estonia	0–1	Wales	Pärnu, Estonia
18:00 UTC+3		Report	Harding 5'	Stadium: Pärnu Rannastaadion; Referee: Kateryna Monzul (Ukraine)

22 October 2021 2023 FIFA Women's World Cup qualification – UEFA Group I	Slovenia	1–1	Wales	Lendava, Slovenia
19:15 UTC+1	Rogan 69'	Report	K. Green 71'	Stadium: Lendava Sports Park; Referee: Lovisa Johansson (Sweden)

26 October 2021 2023 FIFA Women's World Cup qualification – UEFA Group I	Wales	4–0	Estonia	Cardiff, Wales
19:15 UTC+1	James 27'; Ward 48'; Harding 54'; Ingle 90+3'	Report		Stadium: Cardiff City Stadium; Attendance: 5,445; Referee: Marta Frias Acedo (Spain)

26 November 2021 2023 FIFA Women's World Cup qualification – UEFA Group I	Wales	5–0	Greece	Llanelli, Wales
19:15 UTC+0	Ingle 7'; K. Green 17'; Holland 26', 56'; Harding 64'	Report		Stadium: Parc y Scarlets; Attendance: 4,065; Referee: Henrikke Nervik (Norway)

30 November 2021 2023 FIFA Women's World Cup qualification – UEFA Group I	France	2–0	Wales	Guingamp, France
20:10 UTC+1	Diani 45+2'; Bacha 90'	Report		Stadium: Stade du Roudourou; Referee: Iuliana Demetrescu (Romania)

=== 2022 ===
16 February 2022 Pinatar Cup	Wales	3–1	Scotland	San Pedro del Pinatar, Spain
14:30 UTC+1	Fishlock 45+6', 53'; Harding 61'	Report	Clelland 45+4'	Stadium: Pinatar Arena

19 February 2022 Pinatar Cup	Wales	0–0 (1–3 p)	Belgium	San Pedro del Pinatar, Spain
19:30 UTC+1		Report		Stadium: Pinatar Arena
	Penalties
	Green (penalty scored); Estcourt (penalty missed); Woodham (penalty missed); James (penalty missed)		(penalty missed) Minnaert; (penalty scored) Blom; (penalty scored) Eurlings; (penalty scored) Cayman

22 February 2022 Pinatar Cup	Wales	0–1	Republic of Ireland	La Manga, Spain
14:30 UTC+1		Report	O'Sullivan 25'	Stadium: La Manga Club Football Stadium

8 April 2023 FIFA Women's World Cup qualification – UEFA Group I	Wales	1–2	France	Llanelli, Wales
19:45 UTC+1	Ingle 71'	Report	Renard 31'; Katoto 57'	Stadium: Parc y Scarlets; Attendance: 4,553; Referee: Jana Adámková (Czech Republic)

12 April 2023 FIFA Women's World Cup qualification – UEFA Group I	Kazakhstan	0–3	Wales	Nur-Sultan, Kazakhstan
14:00 UTC+6		Report	K. Green 30'; Harding 42'; Fishlock 65'	Stadium: Astana Arena; Attendance: 410; Referee: Sara Persson (Sweden)

28 June Friendly	New Zealand	0–0	Wales	San Pedro del Pinatar, Spain
18:00 UTC+1		Report		Stadium: Pinatar Arena

2 September 2023 FIFA Women's World Cup qualification– UEFAGroup I	Greece	0–1	Wales	Volos, Greece
18:00 UTC+2		Report	Jones 34'	Stadium: Panthessaliko Stadium; Attendance: 386; Referee: Monika Mularczyk (Poland)

6 September 2023 FIFA Women's World Cup qualification – UEFA Group I	Wales	0–0	Slovenia	Cardiff, Wales
19:45 UTC+1		Report		Stadium: Cardiff City Stadium; Attendance: 12,741; Referee: Kateryna Monzul (Ukraine)

6 October 2023 FIFA Women's World Cup qualification – UEFA play-offs	Wales	1–0 (a.e.t.)	Bosnia and Herzegovina	Cardiff, Wales
19:15 UTC+1	Fishlock 105+2'	Report		Stadium: Cardiff City Stadium; Attendance: 15,200; Referee: Marta Huerta de Aza (Spain)

11 October 2023 FIFA Women's World Cup qualification – UEFA play-offs	Switzerland	2–1 (a.e.t.)	Wales	Zürich, Switzerland
18:00 UTC+1	Bachmann 45'; Humm 120+1'	Report	Roberts 19'	Stadium: Letzigrund; Attendance: 7,803; Referee: Tess Olofsson (Sweden)

12 November Friendly	Wales	1–1	Finland	San Pedro del Pinatar, Spain
18:30 UTC+0	Jones 31'	Report

=== 2023 ===
15 February 2023 Pinatar Cup	Wales	1–0	Philippines	San Pedro del Pinatar, Spain
19:30 UTC+1	Green 45+1' (pen.)	Report		Stadium: Pinatar Arena; Referee: Lucie Šulcová (Czech Republic)

18 February 2023 Pinatar Cup	Wales	0–0	Iceland	San Pedro del Pinatar, Spain
19:30 UTC+1		Report		Stadium: Pinatar Arena; Referee: Lucie Šulcová (Czech Republic)

21 February 2023 Pinatar Cup	Scotland	1–1	Wales	San Pedro del Pinatar, Spain
14:05 UTC+1	Howard 8'	Report	Holland 42'	Stadium: Pinatar Arena; Referee: Lucie Šulcová (Czech Republic)

6 April Friendly	Wales	4–1	Northern Ireland	Cardiff, Wales
19:15 UTC+0	Fishlock 16'; James 25'; Cain 30'; Rowe 64'	Report	Wade 73'	Stadium: Cardiff City Stadium; Attendance: 6,831; Referee: Stacey Pearson

11 April Friendly	Portugal	1–1	Wales	Guimarães, Portugal
19:15 UTC+1	Telma 50'	Report	Rowe 73'	Stadium: Estádio D. Afonso Henriques; Attendance: 11,055; Referee: Deborah Anex

9 July Friendly	United States	2–0	Wales	San Jose, California, USA
16:00 ET	Rodman 76', 87'	Report		Stadium: PayPal Park; Attendance: 18,000; Referee: Karen Hernandez (Mexico)

22 September 2023–24 UEFA Nations League	Iceland	1–0	Wales	Reykjavík, Iceland
20:00 (18:00 WET)	Viggósdóttir 18'	Report		Stadium: Laugardalsvöllur, Attendance: 2,014; Referee: Katalin Kulcsár (Hungary)

26 September 2023–24 Nations League	Wales	1–5	Denmark	Cardiff, Wales
19:15 UTC+1	Fishlock 51'	Report	Harder 6' (pen.), 11', 90+1'; Thøgersen 60'; Troelsgaard 87'	Stadium: Cardiff City Stadium; Attendance: 8,607; Referee: Stéphanie Frappart (France)

27 October 2023–24 Nations League	Germany	5–1	Wales	Sinsheim, Germany
17:45	Schüller 25', 47'; Gwinn 80' (pen.); Nüsken 86'; Anyomi 88'	Report	Holland 42'	Stadium: Rhein-Neckar-Arena; Attendance: 20,107; Referee: Monika Mularczyk (Poland)

31 October 2023–24 Nations League	Denmark	2–1	Wales	Viborg, Denmark
18:00	Vangsgaard 28'; Bredgaard 38'	Report	Fishlock 72'	Stadium: Viborg Stadium; Attendance: 2,227; Referee: Sandra Braz (Portugal)

1 December 2023–24 Nations League	Wales	1–2	Iceland	Cardiff, Wales
20:15	Hughes 90+4'	Report	Antonsdóttir 29'; Zomers 79'	Stadium: Cardiff City Stadium; Attendance: 5,275; Referee: Esther Staubli (Switzerland)

5 December 2023–24 Nations League	Wales	0–0	Germany	Swansea, Wales
20:15		Report		Stadium: Swansea.com Stadium; Attendance: 5,982

=== 2024 ===
27 February Friendly	Republic of Ireland	0–2	Wales	Tallaght. Ireland
19:30 UTC+1		Report	Fishlock 7'; Woodham 22'	Stadium: Tallaght Stadium; Attendance: 8,218; Referee: Frida Mia Klarlund (Denmark)

5 April Euro 2025 qualifying	Wales	4–0	Croatia	Wrexham, Wales
19:15 BST	Fishlock 4', 50'; Rowe 51'; James 56'	Report		Stadium: Racecourse Ground; Attendance: 4,117; Referee: Zuzana Valentová (Slovakia)

9 April Euro 2025 qualifying	Kosovo	0–6	Wales	Podujevo, Kosovo
14:00 CEST		Report	Rowe 30', 60'; Barton 44'; Morgan 62'; Hughes 85', 90+3'	Stadium: Zahir Pajaziti Stadium; Attendance: 200; Referee: Galiya Echeva (Bulgaria)

31 May Euro 2025 qualifying	Wales	1–1	Ukraine	Llanelli, Wales
19:15 BST	Green 64' (pen.)	Report	Andrukhiv 3'	Stadium: Parc y Scarlets; Attendance: 4,046; Referee: Shona Shukrula (Netherlands)

4 June Euro 2025 qualifying	Ukraine	2–2	Wales	Grodzisk Wielkopolski, Poland
20:00 CEST	Kalinina 34'; Kozlova 90+8'	Report	Green 74' (pen.); Fishlock 77'	Stadium: Stadion Respect Energy; Attendance: 88; Referee: Caroline Lanssens (Belgium)

12 July Euro 2025 qualifying	Croatia	0–3	Wales	Karlovac, Croatia
20:15 CEST		Report	Fishlock 14'; Ingle 66'; Green 89' (pen.)	Stadium: Stadion Branko Čavlović-Čavlek; Attendance: 457; Referee: Marta Huerta De Aza, Spain

16 July Euro 2025 qualifying	Wales	2–0	Kosovo	Llanelli, Wales
18:00 BST	Fishlock 8'; McAteer 14'	Report		Stadium: Parc y Scarlets; Attendance: 4,189; Referee: Deborah Anex, Switzerland

25 October UEFA Women's Euro 2025 qualifying play-offs	Slovakia	2–1	Wales	Poprad, Slovakia
17:30 CEST	Šurnovská 49'; Mikolajová 58'	Report	Morgan 89'	Stadium: NTC Poprad; Attendance: 2,013; Referee: Stéphanie Frappart, France

29 October UEFA Women's Euro 2025 qualifying play-offs	Wales	2–0 (a.e.t.)	Slovakia	Cardiff, Wales
19:15 GMT	Fishlock 39'; Holland 112'	Report		Stadium: Cardiff City Stadium; Attendance: 10,504; Referee: Ewa Augustyn, Poland

29 November UEFA Women's Euro 2025 qualifying play-offs	Wales	1–1	Republic of Ireland	Cardiff, Wales
19:15 GMT	Woodham 21'	Report	Clark 35' (o.g.)	Stadium: Cardiff City Stadium; Attendance: 16,845; Referee: Maria Caputi, Italy

3 December UEFA Women's Euro 2025 qualifying play-offs	Republic of Ireland	1–2	Wales	Dublin, Ireland
19:30 GMT	Patten 86'	Report	Cain 50' (pen.); Jones 67'	Stadium: Aviva Stadium; Attendance: 25,832; Referee: Marta Huerta de Aza, Spain

=== 2025 ===
21 February 2025 Nations League	Italy	1–0	Wales	Monza, Italy
18:15 CET	Barbara Bonansea 5'	Report		Stadium: Stadio Brianteo; Attendance: 4,219; Referee: Katalin Kulcsár

25 February 2025 Nations League	Wales	1–1	Sweden	Wrexham, Wales
19:15 GMT	Barton 77' (pen.)	Report	Angeldahl 14'	Stadium: Racecourse Ground; Attendance: 6,077; Referee: Désirée Grundbacher

4 April 2025 Nations League	Wales	1–2	Denmark	Cardiff, Wales
19:15 GMT	Holland 34'	Report	Bruun 7' Vangsgaard 72'	Stadium: Cardiff City Stadium; Attendance: 6,779; Referee: Michalina Diakow POL

8 April 2025 Nations League	Sweden	1–1	Wales	Gothenburg, Sweden
19:00 CEST	Eriksson 59'	Report	Cain 67'	Stadium: Gamla Ullevi; Attendance: 8,759; Referee: Olatz Rivera Olmedo ESP

30 May 2025 Nations League	Denmark	1–0	Wales	Odense, Denmark
19:15 CEST	Harder 48'	Report		Stadium: Odense Stadion; Attendance: 3,442; Referee: Catarina Campos POR

3 June 2025 Nations League	Wales	1–4	Italy	Swansea, Wales
18:30 BST	Fishlock 82'	Report	Linari 9' Girelli 21', 45+5' Cantore 41'	Stadium: Liberty Stadium; Attendance: 5,962; Referee: Antoniou GRE

5 July Euro 2025 group stage	Wales	0–3	Netherlands	Lucerne, Switzerland
18:00 CEST		Report	Miedema 45+3'; Pelova 48'; Brugts 57'	Stadium: Swissporarena; Attendance: 14,147; Referee: Frida Klarlund (Denmark)

9 July Euro 2025 group stage	France	4–1	Wales	St. Gallen, Switzerland
21:00 CEST	Mateo 8'; Diani 45+1' (pen.); Majri 53'; Geyoro 63'	Report	Fishlock 13'	Stadium: Kybunpark; Attendance: 15,886; Referee: Désirée Grundbacher (Switzerland)

13 July Euro 2025 group stage	England	6–1	Wales	St. Gallen, Switzerland
21:00 CEST	Stanway 13' (pen.); Toone 21'; Hemp 30'; Russo 44'; Mead 72'; Beever-Jones 89'	Report	Cain 76'	Stadium: Kybunpark; Attendance: 15,953; Referee: Frida Klarlund (Denmark)

25 October Friendly	Wales	1–2	Australia	Cardiff
14:00 BST	Griffiths 55'	Source	Nevin 27'; Foord 85'	Stadium: Cardiff City Stadium; Attendance: 11,173; Referee: Stacey Pearson (England)

28 October Friendly	Wales	2–5	Poland	Newport
19:45 GMT	Hughes 5'; Jones 56'	Report	Krezyman 22', 61'; Kokosz 29'; Tomasiak 57'; Jedlińska 84'	Stadium: Rodney Parade; Attendance: 2,566; Referee: Kirsty Dowle (England)

28 November Friendly	Wales	1–1	South Korea	Málaga, Spain
19:00 CET	Ingle 6'	Report	Jang 68'	Stadium: Ciudad Deportiva Fundación Málaga CF; Attendance: circa 65; Referee: Caroline Lanssens (Belgium)

2 December Friendly	Wales	3–2	Switzerland	Jerez de la Frontera, Spain
12:00 CET	Ingle 15'; Cain 35'; Woodham 46'		Csillag 18'; Beney 71'	Stadium: Chapín; Attendance: circa 45; Referee: Ainara Andrea Acevedo Dudle (Spain)

=== 2026 ===
3 March 2027 FIFA Women's World Cup qualification	Czech Republic	2–2	Wales	Uherské Hradiště, Czech Republic
18:30 CET	Bartoňová 16'; Žufánková 54'	Report	Cain 35'; Hughes 90+3'	Stadium: Městský fotbalový stadion Attendance: 2,358; Referee: Volha Blotskaya (Belarus)

7 March 2027 FIFA Women's World Cup qualification	Wales	6–1	Montenegro	Llanelli, Wales
16:30 GMT	Cain 6', 35'; Rowe 15'; Griffiths 17', 78'; Ingle 31'	Report	Kuč 51'	Stadium: Parc y Scarlets; Attendance: 4,550; Referee: Caroline Lanssens (Belgium)

14 April 2027 FIFA Women's World Cup qualification	Wales	4–0	Albania	Wrexham, Wales
19:15 BST	Cain 15', 55'; Hughes 35'; Roberts 48'	Report		Stadium: Racecourse Ground; Attendance: 4,485; Referee: Katalin Sipos (Hungary)

18 April 2027 FIFA Women's World Cup qualification	Albania	0–1	Wales	Elbasan, Albania
18:00 CEST		Report	Roberts 28'	Stadium: Elbasan Arena; Attendance: 538; Referee: Lizzy van der Helm (Netherlands)

5 June 2027 FIFA Women's World Cup qualification	Montenegro	1–1	Wales	Podgorica, Montenegro
18:00 CEST	Đoković 79'	Report	Cain 41' (pen.)	Stadium: Podgorica City Stadium; Attendance: 400; Referee: Henrikke Nervik (Norway)

9 June 2027 FIFA Women's World Cup qualification	Wales	3–1	Czech Republic	Cardiff, Wales
18:00 BST	Woodham 9' * Evans 49' * Griffiths 72'	Report	Khýrová 5'	Stadium: Cardiff City Stadium; Attendance: 5,607; Referee: Deborah Bianchi (Italy)

9 October 2027 FIFA Women's World Cup play-offs	Albania	0–1	Wales	Shkodër, Albania
18:00 CET		Report	Franja 22' (o.g.)	Stadium: Loro Boriçi Stadium; Attendance: 642; Referee: Eleni Antoniou (Greece)

13 October 2027 FIFA Women's World Cup play-offs	Wales	3–0	Albania	Llanelli, Wales
19:15 BST	Davies 34'; Hughes 50'; Cain 62'	Report		Stadium: Parc y Scarlets; Attendance: 4,837; Referee: Ionela Alina Pesu (Romania)
