= Selen Altunkulak =

Turkish footballer (born 1997)

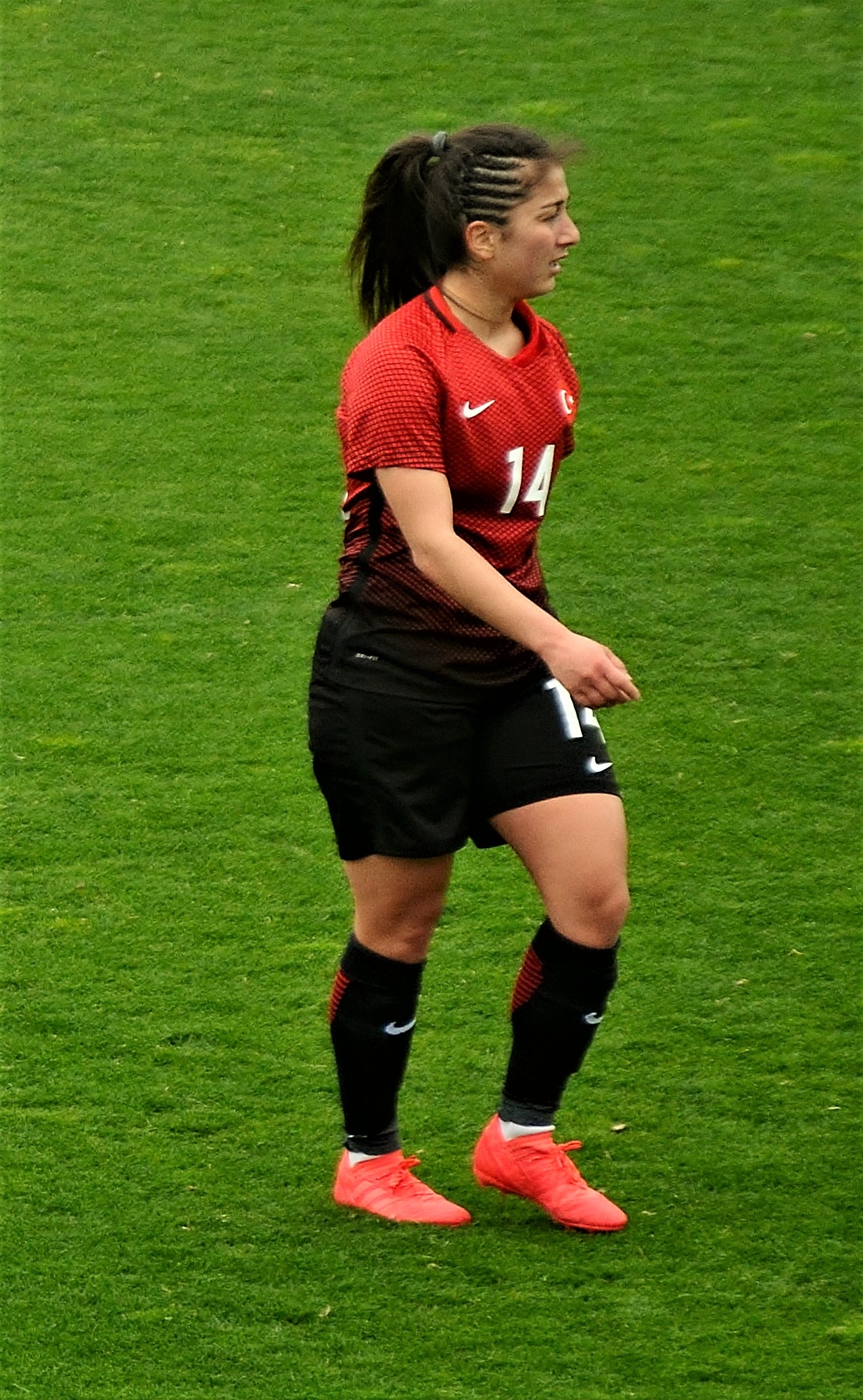
- Altunkulak with Turkey in 2018

Personal information
- Full name: Selen Gül Altunkulak
- Date of birth: 2 December 1997 (age 28)
- Place of birth: Valence, France
- Height: 1.63 m (5 ft 4 in)
- Positions: Forward; midfielder

Team information
- Current team: Toulouse
- Number: 6

Youth career
- 2011–2012: Vendenheim
- 2012–2013: Monteux

Senior career*
Years	Team	Apps	(Gls)
2013–2015	Vendenheim	21	(8)
2015–2019	Metz	55	(13)
2019–2020	Marseille	4	(0)
2020–2023	Rodez	30	(12)
2023–	Toulouse	79	(89)

International career^{‡}
2017–	Turkey	22	(13)
- * Club domestic league appearances and goals as of 20:00, 20 November 2026 (UTC) ‡ National team caps and goals as of 23:00, 13 October 2026 (UTC)

Selen Gül Altunkulak (born 2 December 1997) is a professional footballer who plays as a forward or midfielder for Première Ligue club Toulouse. Born in France, she plays for the Turkey national team.

== Club career ==
Altunkulak played in the U19 youth team of FC Vendenheim in the 2011–12 season and of FCF Monteux in 2012–13 season. Between 2013 and 2015, she was a member of FC Vendenheim again. In the 2015–16 season, she transferred to Metz.

For the 2019–20 Division 1 Féminine season, she signed on 1 July 2019 with Olympique de Marseille, which was recently promoted from the Division 2 Féminine.

She signed with Rodez on 29 January 2022, and played two seasons. On 12 January 2024, she transferred to Toulouse. In the 2023–24 Division 3 Féminine season, she appeared in 21 matches and scored 33 goals. She scored also one goal in two matches of the Coupe de France Féminine.

== International career ==
She was admitted to the Turkey women's national team, and debuted internationally in the Goldcity Women's Cup 2017 on 1 March 2017, and scored her first international goal. She took part at the 2019 FIFA Women's World Cup qualification – UEFA preliminary round – Group 4 matches. In the second match of the tournament, she scored a hat-trick in the match against Luxembourg on 8 April 2017.

== Career statistics ==
=== International ===
As of match played 13 October 2026

Appearances and goals by national team and year
National team	Year	Apps	Goals
Turkey	2017	6	5
Turkey	2018	2	3
Turkey	2019	4	0
Turkey	2025	2	1
Turkey	2026	8	4
Total		22	13

Scores and results list Turkey's goal tally first, score column indicates score after each Altunkulak goal.

List of international goals scored by Selen Altunkulak
No.	Date	Venue	Opponent	Score	Result	Competition
1	5 March 2017	Gold City Sports Complex, Antalya, Turkey	Kosovo	3–2	4–2	2017 Turkish Women's Cup
2	6 April 2017	Tórsvøllur, Tórshavn, Faroe Islands	Montenegro	2–0	3–0	2019 FIFA Women's World Cup qualification preliminary round
3	8 April 2017	Tórsvøllur, Tórshavn, Faroe Islands	Luxembourg	5–0	9–1	2019 FIFA Women's World Cup qualification preliminary round
4	8 April 2017	Tórsvøllur, Tórshavn, Faroe Islands	Luxembourg	7–1	9–1	2019 FIFA Women's World Cup qualification preliminary round
5	8 April 2017	Tórsvøllur, Tórshavn, Faroe Islands	Luxembourg	8–1	9–1	2019 FIFA Women's World Cup qualification preliminary round
6	4 April 2018	TFF Riva Facility, Istanbul, Turkey	Estonia	2–0	3–2	Friendly
7	4 April 2018	TFF Riva Facility, Istanbul, Turkey	Estonia	3–2	3–2	Friendly
8	7 April 2018	TFF Riva Facility, Istanbul, Turkey	Estonia	2–0	3–0	Friendly
9	1 December 2025	TFF Riva Facility, Istanbul, Turkey	Albania	2–0	2–0	Friendly
10	18 April 2026	Sinop City Stadium, Sinop, Turkey	Switzerland	1–1	1–1	2027 FIFA Women's World Cup qualification
11	9 June 2026	Centenary Stadium, Ta' Qali, Malta	Malta	3–0	3–0	2027 FIFA Women's World Cup qualification
12	9 October 2026	Pendik Stadium, Istanbul, Turkey	Slovenia	2–0	3–3	2027 FIFA Women's World Cup qualification play-offs
13	9 October 2026	Pendik Stadium, Istanbul, Turkey	Slovenia	3–1	3–3	2027 FIFA Women's World Cup qualification play-offs

== Honours ==
Toulouse

- Seconde Ligue: 2025–26
- Division 3 Féminine: 2023–24

Individual

- LFFP Seconde Ligue best player: 2022–23, 2025–26
- Seconde Ligue top goalscorer: 2022–23, 2025–26
- Division 3 Féminine top goalscorer: 2023–24
