= Carolina Santiago =

Portuguese footballer (born 2006)

Personal information
- Date of birth: August 31, 2006 (age 20)
- Position: Forward

Team information
- Current team: Sporting CP
- Number: 13

Senior career*
Years	Team	Apps	(Gls)
2021–	Sporting CP	18	(8)
2024–2025	→ Valadares Gaia (loan)	29	(12)

International career^{‡}
2022	Portugal U-16	1	(1)
2023–	Portugal U-19	28	(9)
2025–	Portugal	11	(5)
- * Club domestic league appearances and goals as of 13 September 2026 ‡ National team caps and goals as of 13 October 2026

Carolina Santiago (born 31 August 2006) is a Portuguese professional footballer who plays as a forward for Campeonato Nacional Feminino club Sporting CP and the Portugal national team.

== Club career ==
Santiago joined Sporting CP's youth program in 2020/21. On 6 August 2024, she joined Valadares Gaia on a season-long loan. She scored 12 goals in 29 games while on loan with the Porto area club.

On 2 October 2025, after scoring five goals in four games to start the season, Santiago agreed a new contract with Sporting until 2029.

== International career ==
Portugal head coach Francisco Neto first called Santiago up to the senior team in October 2025.

== Career statistics ==
=== International goals ===
No.	Date	Venue	Opponent	Score	Result	Competition
1.	3 March 2026	Estádio do Futebol Clube de Vizela, Vizela, Portugal	Finland	2–0	2–0	2027 FIFA Women's World Cup qualification
2.	7 March 2026	Estádio Cidade de Barcelos, Barcelos, Portugal	Slovakia	2–0	4–0	2027 FIFA Women's World Cup qualification
3.	18 April 2026	Futbal Tatran Arena, Prešov, Slovakia	Slovakia	2–1	2–1	2027 FIFA Women's World Cup qualification
4.	5 June 2026	Estádio António Coimbra da Mota, Estoril, Portugal	Latvia	1–0	5–0	2027 FIFA Women's World Cup qualification
5.	13 October 2026	Estádio Municipal de Portimão, Portimão, Portugal	Northern Ireland	1–1	3–1	2027 FIFA Women's World Cup qualification play-offs

== Honors and awards ==
Individual

- Record Campeonato Nacional Feminino Best XI: 2025–26
