= Lotta Lindström =

Finnish footballer (born 2004)

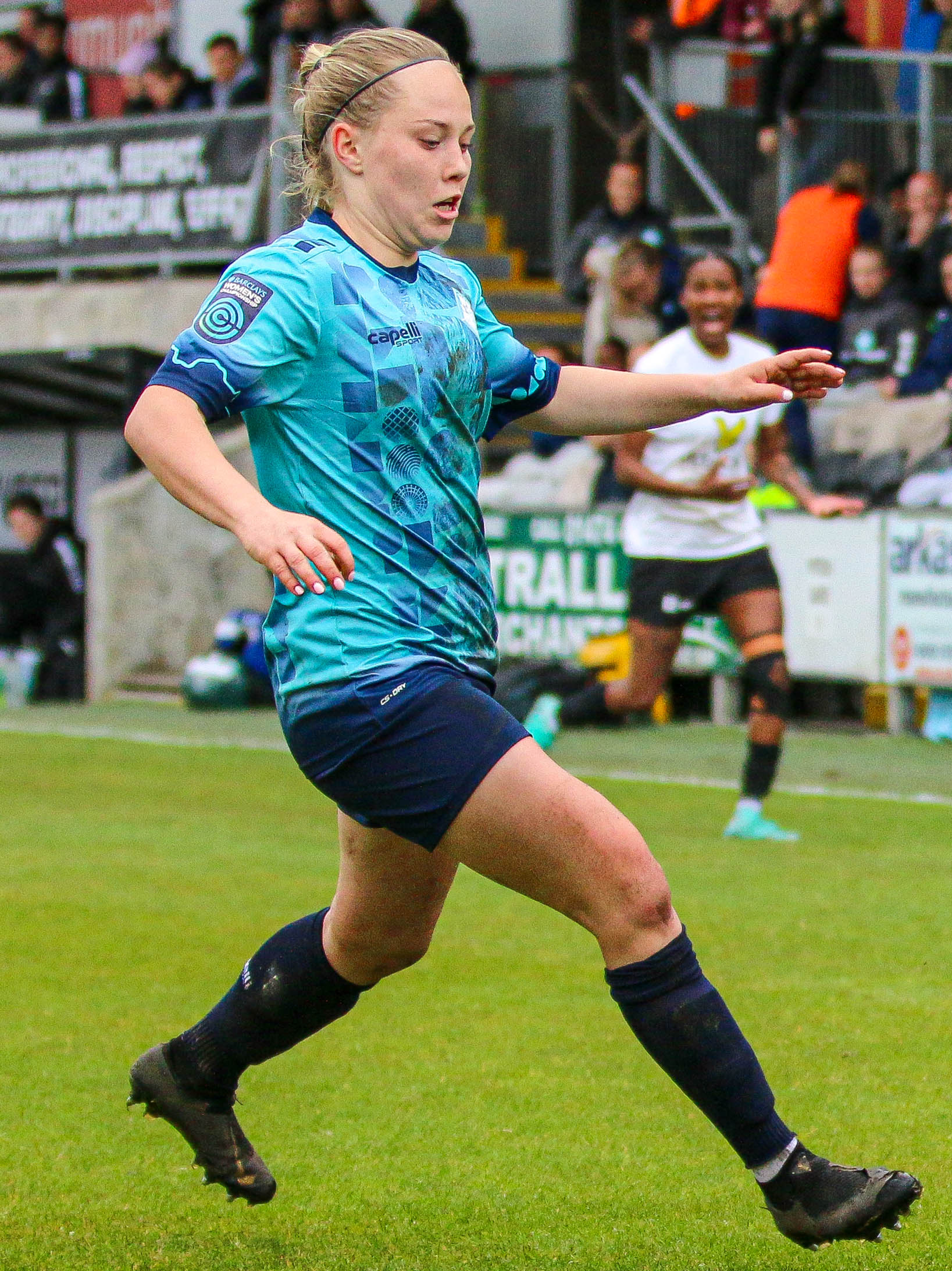
- Lindström with London City Lionesses in 2024

Personal information
- Date of birth: 10 September 2004 (age 22)
- Place of birth: Hyvinkää, Finland
- Height: 1.66 m (5 ft 5 in)
- Position: Forward

Team information
- Current team: Bristol City

Youth career
- –2020: HyPS
- 2021–2022: HFA-Märsky

Senior career*
Years	Team	Apps	(Gls)
2018–2020	HyPS	20	(23)
2023	HJK	23	(17)
2024–2026	London City Lionesses	11	(3)
2026	→ Birmingham City (loan)	1	(3)
2026–	Bristol City	0	(0)

International career^{‡}
2019	Finland U16	2	(1)
2021–23	Finland U19	10	(4)
2023	Finland U23	3	(2)
2023–	Finland	16	(5)
- * Club domestic league appearances and goals as of 5 October 2025 ‡ National team caps and goals as of 15 October 2026

Lotta Lindström (Finland Swedish: [ˈlɔtːa ˈlɪnːdstrøm]; born 10 September 2004) is a Finnish professional footballer who plays as a forward for Women's Super League 2 club Bristol City and the Finland national team. She had a loan spell with Birmingham City for the later part of the 2025–26 season.

== Club career ==
=== HyPS ===
Lindström started playing football in youth teams of HyPS in Hyvinkää, and made her senior debut with the club's first team in 2018 in fifth-tier Naisten Nelonen at the age 14. She studied and played in Helsinki Football Academy during 2021–2022, but missed the last year due to knee injury.

=== HJK ===
Lindström signed with Kansallinen Liiga side HJK for the 2023 season. In her first season in the league, she scored 17 goals in 23 league appearances, making her the Kansallinen Liiga Top Goalscorer. She was named the Player of the Year by HJK supporters Forza HJK. The club eventually finished in 2nd place in the league, and in the Finnish Women's Cup in 2023.

=== London City Lionesses ===
On 1 February 2024, Lindström signed with English club London City Lionesses in Women's Championship on a three-and-a-half-year deal, for an undisclosed fee. She scored a goal in her Championship debut with her new team on 18 February 2024, in a 2–2 draw against Durham. On 19 September, it was announced that Lindström would be out of the line-up for the rest of the 2024–25 season due to ACL injury.

On 14 September 2025, Lindström made her first appearance for the Lionesses in the Women's Super League, in a 5–1 loss to Manchester United.

=== Birmingham City ===
On 7 January 2026, Lindström went on loan to Birmingham City for the rest of the 2025–26 season.

== International career ==
Lindström has represented Finland at various youth international levels. She received her first call-up to Finland senior national team in October 2023 for 2023–24 UEFA Women's Nations League B matches, and eventually made her debut on 5 December 2023 against Slovakia.

== Career statistics ==
=== Club ===
As of 11 September 2024.

Appearances and goals by club, season and competition
Club	Season	League			Cup (Note: Includes Finnish Women's Cup and Women's FA Cup)		Europe		Other		Total	
Club	Season	Division	Apps	Goals	Apps	Goals	Apps	Goals	Apps	Goals	Apps	Goals
HyPS	2018	Naisten Nelonen	3	2	–		–		–		3	2
HyPS	2019	Naisten Kolmonen	6	7	–		–		–		6	7
HyPS	2020	Naisten Kolmonen	11	14	–		–		–		11	14
HyPS	Total		20	23	0	0	0	0	0	0	20	23
HJK	2023	Kansallinen Liiga	23	17	4	4	–		6 (Note: Includes Kansallinen Cup)	8	33	29
London City Lionesses	2023–24	Women's Championship	6	3	0	0	–		–		6	3
London City Lionesses	2024–25	Women's Championship	1	0	0	0	–		–		1	0
London City Lionesses	2025-26	Women's Super League	5	0	3	1	–		–		8	1
London City Lionesses	Total		12	3	3	1	–		0	0	15	4
Career total			62	46	7	5	0	0	6	8	75	59

=== International ===
As of 13 October 2026

Appearances and goals by national team and year
National team	Year	Apps	Goals
Finland	2023	1	0
Finland	2024	3	0
Finland	2025	4	1
Finland	2026	8	4
Total		16	5

List of international goals scored by Lotta Lindström
No.	Date	Venue	Opponent	Score	Result	Competition
1.	24 October 2025	Tammelan Stadion, Tampere, Finland	Denmark	1–5	1–6	2025 UEFA Women's Nations League play-off matches
2.	18 April 2026	Daugava Stadium, Riga, Latvia	Latvia	1–0	1–0	2027 FIFA Women's World Cup qualification
3.	5 June 2026	Štadión pod Zoborom, Nitra, Slovakia	Slovakia	2–0	4–0	2027 FIFA Women's World Cup qualification
4.	5 June 2026	Štadión pod Zoborom, Nitra, Slovakia	Slovakia	4–0	4–0	2027 FIFA Women's World Cup qualification
5.	9 October 2026	Tammelan Stadion, Tampere, Finland	Serbia	2–0	3–1	2027 FIFA Women's World Cup qualification play-offs

== Honours ==
HJK

- Kansallinen Liiga: 2023 Runners-up
- Finnish Women's Cup: 2023 Runners-up

Birmingham City

- Women's Super League 2: 2025–26

Finland

- Pinatar Cup: 2024

Individual

- Kansallinen Liiga Top Goalscorer: 2023
- Kansallinen Liiga Forward of the Year: 2023
- Kansallinen Liiga Rookie of the Year: 2023
- Kansallinen Liiga Player of the Month: May 2023
