= Jarne Teulings =

Belgian footballer (born 2002)

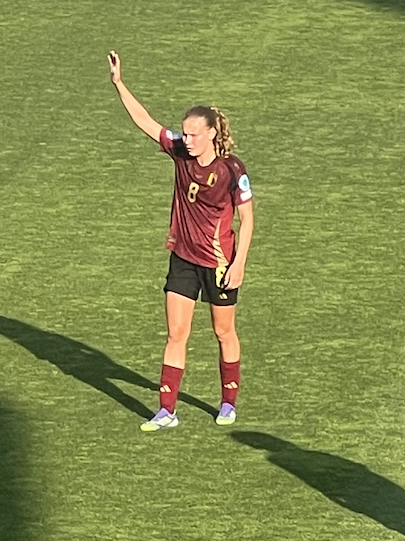
- Teulings with Belgium in 2025

Personal information
- Date of birth: 11 January 2002 (age 24)
- Place of birth: Belgium
- Height: 1.68 m (5 ft 6 in)
- Position: Midfielder

Team information
- Current team: Eintracht Frankfurt
- Number: 9

Senior career*
Years	Team	Apps	(Gls)
2017–2019	OH Leuven	30	(3)
2019–2020	Genk	16	(7)
2020–2021	Anderlecht	18	(3)
2021–2022	Twente	10	(1)
2022	Anderlecht	10	(2)
2022–2024	Fortuna Sittard	42	(7)
2024–2025	Feyenoord	22	(6)
2025–	Eintracht Frankfurt	21	(0)

International career^{‡}
2020–	Belgium	38	(3)
- * Club domestic league appearances and goals as of 6 November 2026 ‡ National team caps and goals as of 14 October 2026

Jarne Teulings (born 11 January 2002) is a Belgian professional footballer who plays as a midfielder for Bundesliga club Eintracht Frankfurt and the Belgium national team.

== Club career ==
Teulings made her debut in the Belgian first division during the 2017–18 season, playing for OH Leuven. After some good performances during the 2018–19 season she subsequently signed for KRC Genk.

For the 2020–21 season she signed for Anderlecht which marked her break-through as a regular player in both the competition, as well as the national team.

After winning the 2020–21 championship with Anderlecht, Teulings signed a two-year contract with FC Twente. However, after six months, Teulings returned to Anderlecht for the remainder of the 2021–22 season.

In July 2025, Teulings signed a contract with Bundesliga club Eintracht Frankfurt until 30 June 2028.

== International career ==
Teulings made her debut for the Belgium national team on 27 October 2020, coming on as a substitute for Janice Cayman against Lithuania.

At the start of 2022, Teulings helped Belgium win the Pinatar Cup in Spain for the first time, beating Russia on penalties in the final after a 0–0 draw.

She was not named in the Belgium squad for UEFA Women's Euro 2022 in England, where the Red Flames were beaten in the quarter-finals 1–0 by Sweden, but did go on to contribute to Belgium's successful qualification for UEFA Women's Euro 2025 via the play-offs, starting both legs of the play-off final against Ukraine.

On 11 June 2025, Teulings was called up to the Belgium squad for the UEFA Women's Euro 2025.

== Career statistics ==
=== International ===
Scores and results list Belgium's goal tally first, score column indicates score after each Teulings goal.

List of international goals scored by Jarne Teulings
No.	Date	Venue	Opponent	Score	Result	Competition
1	25 November 2021	Den Dreef, Leuven, Belgium	Armenia	14–0	19–0	2023 FIFA Women's World Cup qualifier
2	25 November 2021	Den Dreef, Leuven, Belgium	Armenia	19–0	19–0	2023 FIFA Women's World Cup qualifier
3	13 October 2026	Gdańsk Stadium, Gdańsk, Poland	Poland	2–2	2–3 (a.e.t.) (3–4 p)	2027 FIFA Women's World Cup qualification

== Honours ==
Anderlecht

- Belgian Women's Super League: 2021–22
- Belgian Women's Cup: 2022

Belgium

- Pinatar Cup: 2022
