= Leyla McFarland =

Northern Irish footballer (born 2000)

Personal information
- Date of birth: 20 August 2000 (age 26)
- Place of birth: United States
- Position: Forward

Team information
- Current team: Rapperswil-Jona

College career
Years	Team	Apps	(Gls)
2018–2022	Pepperdine Waves	88	(15)

Senior career*
Years	Team	Apps	(Gls)
2023	León	5	(0)
2024	Ferencváros		
2025–2026	Durham	8	(0)
2026–	Rapperswil-Jona	0	(0)

International career^{‡}
2025–	Northern Ireland	6	(1)
- * Club domestic league appearances and goals as of 16 November 2025 ‡ National team caps and goals as of 18 October 2026

Leyla McFarland (born 20 August 2000) is a professional footballer who plays as a forward for Rapperswil-Jona. Born in the United States, she plays for the Northern Ireland national team.

== Early life ==
McFarland was born on 20 August 2000 and is a native of San Diego County, California, United States. The daughter of Ian and Catherine, she has two sisters and a brother.

Growing up, she competed in track and field and attended Eastlake High School in the United States. Following her stint there, she attended Pepperdine University in the United States.

== Club career ==
In 2023, McFarland signed for Mexican side León, where she made five league appearances and scored zero goals. Subsequently, she signed for Hungarian side Ferencváros in 2024, where she played in the UEFA Women's Champions League. Ahead of the 2025–26 season, she signed for English side Durham.

On 22 July 2026, McFarland was announced at Rapperswil-Jona.

== International career ==
McFarland is a Northern Ireland international. During the summer of 2025, she played for the Northern Ireland women's national under-19 football team at the 2017 UEFA Women's Under-19 Championship.

=== International goals ===
Scores and results list Switzerland's goal tally first, score column indicates score after each McFarland goal.

List of international goals scored by Leyla McFarland
No.	Date	Venue	Opponent	Score	Result	Competition
1	18 April 2026	Centenary Stadium, Ta' Qali, Malta	Malta	4–1	4–2	2027 FIFA Women's World Cup qualification
