= 2027 FIFA Women's World Cup qualification – UEFA play-offs =

European football qualifying tournament

Tournament details
- Dates: 9 October – 5 December 2026
- Teams: 32 (from 1 confederation)

Tournament statistics
- Matches played: 32
- Goals scored: 133 (4.16 per match)
- Attendance: 122,704 (3,835 per match)
- Top scorer: (Sweden women's national football team) Felicia Schröder (5 goals)
- All statistics correct as of 13 October 2026.

The play-off phase of UEFA qualification will determine the final seven European teams to directly qualify for the 2027 FIFA Women's World Cup and the single European representative at the inter-confederation play-offs.

== Format ==
Two rounds of home-and-away knockout matches will be held during the international windows in October 2026 and November–December 2026.

- Round 1: Thirty-two teams advanced from the league phase and were drawn into two paths to compete 9 and 13 October 2026.
  - Path 1: The runners-up and third-place teams from League A were drawn against the group winners and two best-ranked runners-up from League C. The League A teams hosted the second legs of their respective ties.
  - Path 2: The fourth-place teams from League A and the group winners from League B were drawn against the runners-up and third-place teams from League B. The fourth-place League A teams and League B group winners hosted the second legs of their respective ties.
- Round 2: Sixteen teams advanced from Round 1. Placeholders for the Path 1 winners were drawn against placeholders for the Path 2 winners to compete 26 November – 5 December 2026. The Path 1 winners will host the second legs of their respective ties. The winners will be ranked based on their overall league ranking, with the top seven winners qualifying for the Women's World Cup and the lowest-ranked winner advancing to the inter-confederation play-offs.

The team scoring the most goals after two matches will win the tie. If the scores are even after normal time in the second leg, two 15-minute extra time periods will be played. If the scores are still even after extra time, the tie will be decided by kicks from the penalty spot (Regulations Article 28).

== Qualified teams ==
The following teams qualified for the play-offs. They are ordered according to their overall league ranking:

=== Round 1 Path 1 ===
Seeded teams	Unseeded teams
5. England; 6. Norway; 7. Netherlands; 8. Italy; 9. Republic of Ireland; 10. Sweden; 11. Iceland; 12. Austria	33. Hungary; 34. Greece; 35. Romania; 36. Belarus; 37. Kosovo; 38. Lithuania; 39. Croatia; 40. Kazakhstan

=== Round 1 Path 2 ===
Seeded teams	Unseeded teams
13. Slovenia; 14. Poland; 15. Serbia; 16. Ukraine; 17. Switzerland; 18. Portugal; 19. Scotland; 20. Wales	21. Finland; 22. Belgium; 23. Turkey; 24. Czech Republic; 25. Albania; 26. Northern Ireland; 27. Slovakia; 28. Israel

== Draw ==
The draws for Rounds 1 and 2 were held 18 June 2026 at 12:00 CEST in Nyon, Switzerland.

In the Round 1 draw, an unseeded team from Path 1 was drawn and placed in Tie 1, then a seeded team was drawn against the unseeded team. The process was repeated for Ties 2–8 then performed for Path 2 and Ties 9–16. In the Round 2 draw, a placeholder indicating a Path 2 winner was drawn and placed into a tie, then a placeholder indicating a Path 1 winner was drawn against the Path 2 winner. The process was repeated until the Round 2 ties were filled.

For political reasons, Kosovo and Serbia, as well as Belarus and Ukraine, could not be drawn against each other in Round 2. For that reason, the placeholders for Ties 6 and 8 could not be drawn against Ties 16 and 11, respectively.

== Brackets ==
Round 1
Tie 11
Slovakia	1	0	1
Ukraine	3	1	4
Tie 3
Greece	1	0	1
England	3	5	8

Round 2
Ukraine
England

Round 1
Tie 16
Finland	3	3	6
Serbia	1	1	2
Tie 8
Belarus	0	1	1
Italy	2	1	3

Round 2
Finland
Italy

Round 1
Tie 15
Northern Ireland	0	1	1
Portugal	4	3	7
Tie 4
Croatia	0	0	0
Iceland	4	5	9

Round 2
Portugal
Iceland

Round 1
Tie 9
Albania	0	0	0
Wales	1	3	4
Tie 2
Romania	0	0	0
Norway	2	6	8

Round 2
Wales
Norway

Round 1
Tie 12
Israel	3	0	3
Switzerland	7	2	9
Tie 6
Kosovo	1	0	1
Austria	2	4	6

Round 2
Switzerland
Austria

Round 1
Tie 14
Czech Republic	0	2	2
Scotland	2	3	5
Tie 1
Lithuania	0	0	0
Sweden	5	10	15

Round 2
Scotland
Sweden

Round 1
Tie 13
Belgium	1	2	3
Poland	0	3	3
Tie 5
Kazakhstan	0	0	0
Republic of Ireland	8	4	12

Round 2
Poland
Republic of Ireland

Round 1
Tie 10
Turkey	3	0	3
Slovenia	3	2	5
Tie 7
Hungary	0	0	0
Netherlands	8	3	11

Round 2
Slovenia
Netherlands

== Round 1 ==
Times are CET/CEST, (Note: CEST (UTC+2) for Round 1, and CET (UTC+1) for Round 2.) as listed by UEFA (local times, if different, are in parentheses).

=== Path 1 ===
==== Summary ====
Team 1	Agg.	Team 2	1st leg	2nd leg
Lithuania	0–15	Sweden	0–5	0–10
Romania	0–8	Norway	0–2	0–6
Greece	1–8	England	1–3	0–5
Croatia	0–9	Iceland	0–4	0–5
Kazakhstan	0–12	Republic of Ireland	0–8	0–4
Kosovo	1–6	Austria	1–2	0–4
Hungary	0–11	Netherlands	0–8	0–3
Belarus	1–3	Italy	0–2	1–1

==== Matches ====
9 October 2026
18:05 (19:05 UTC+3)

Lithuania	0–5	Sweden
	Report (FIFA); Report (UEFA)	Schröder 23' (pen.), 58', 63'; Blackstenius 74'; Ilestedt 82'

Darius and Girėnas Stadium, Kaunas
Attendance: 2,022
Referee: Deborah Anex (Switzerland)
13 October 2026
19:00

Sweden	10–0	Lithuania
Björn 11'; Blackstenius 16', 52'; Holmberg 25'; Lundkvist 30'; Schröder 36', 45+1'; Ilestedt 60', 81'; Šeškutė 69' (o.g.)	Report (FIFA); Report (UEFA)

Nationalarenan, Stockholm
Attendance: 10,309
Referee: Lotta Vuorio (Finland)

Sweden won 15–0 on aggregate.

9 October 2026
19:00 (20:00 UTC+3)

Romania	0–2	Norway
	Report (FIFA); Report (UEFA)	Reiten 10'; Maanum 34'

Arcul de Triumf Stadium, Bucharest
Attendance: 4,207
Referee: Emily Heaslip (England)
13 October 2026
18:00

Norway	6–0	Romania
Jensen 3'; Terland 9', 12', 54' (pen.); Østenstad 66'; Blakstad 70'	Report (FIFA); Report (UEFA)

Ullevaal Stadion, Oslo
Attendance: 9,310
Referee: Olivia Tschon (Austria)

Norway won 8–0 on aggregate.

9 October 2026
18:30 (19:30 UTC+3)

Greece	1–3	England
Brookshire 78'	Report (FIFA); Report (UEFA)	Stanway 39'; Le Tissier 63'; Russo 67'

Pankritio Stadium, Heraklion
Attendance: 3,942
Referee: Martina Molinaro (Italy)
13 October 2026
20:30 (19:30 UTC+1)

England	5–0	Greece
Russo 3', 75'; James 16', 34'; Stanway 30'	Report (FIFA); Report (UEFA)

King Power Stadium, Leicester
Attendance: 18,587
Referee: Rasa Grigonė (Lithuania)

England won 8–1 on aggregate.

9 October 2026
18:45

Croatia	0–4	Iceland
	Report (FIFA); Report (UEFA)	A. Eiríksdóttir 14', 90+5'; Viggósdóttir 67' (pen.); H. Eiríksdóttir 75'

Stadion Aldo Drosina, Pula
Attendance: 140
Referee: Frida Klarlund (Denmark)
13 October 2026
17:30 (15:30 UTC+0)

Iceland	5–0	Croatia
H. Eiríksdóttir 35'; Hermannsdóttir 40'; Tryggvadóttir 57'; Zomers 87', 90+3'	Report (FIFA); Report (UEFA)

Laugardalsvöllur, Reykjavík
Attendance: 2,023
Referee: Olatz Rivera Olmedo (Spain)

Iceland won 9–0 on aggregate.

9 October 2026
13:00 (16:00 UTC+5)

Kazakhstan	0–8	Republic of Ireland
	Report (FIFA); Report (UEFA)	Carusa 7', 28'; Mustaki 16'; Murphy 44'; Larkin 45+3'; Finn 58'; Hopcroft 73'; Stapleton 90'

Astana Arena, Astana
Attendance: 1,000
Referee: Karoline Marie Jensen (Norway)
13 October 2026
20:30 (19:30 UTC+1)

Republic of Ireland	4–0	Kazakhstan
Stapleton 40'; McCabe 48'; Quinn 70'; O'Sullivan 73'	Report (FIFA); Report (UEFA)

Páirc Uí Chaoimh, Cork
Attendance: 10,334
Referee: Michaela Pachtová (Czech Republic)

Republic of Ireland won 12–0 on aggregate.

9 October 2026
18:00

Kosovo	1–2	Austria
Memeti 14'	Report (FIFA); Report (UEFA)	Schöffel 37'; Billa 81'

Fadil Vokrri Stadium, Pristina
Attendance: 652
Referee: Kristina Georgieva (Bulgaria)
13 October 2026
18:00

Austria	4–0	Kosovo
Höbinger 7'; Puntigam 65'; Kirchberger 86'; Campbell 90'	Report (FIFA); Report (UEFA)

Wiener Sport-Club Platz, Vienna
Attendance: 3,514
Referee: Nanna Løf Andersen (Denmark)

Austria won 6–1 on aggregate.

9 October 2026
20:00

Hungary	0–8	Netherlands
	Report (FIFA); Report (UEFA)	Beerensteyn 12', 14', 90'; Pelova 26', 58', 62'; Brugts 45+1'; Egurrola 49'

Pancho Aréna, Felcsút
Attendance: 756
Referee: Volha Blotskaya (Belarus)
13 October 2026
20:45

Netherlands	3–0	Hungary
Brugts 8'; Beerensteyn 40'; Egurrola 45+4'	Report (FIFA); Report (UEFA)

Koning Willem II Stadion, Tilburg
Attendance: 8,178
Referee: Franziska Wildfeuer (Germany)

Netherlands won 11–0 on aggregate.

9 October 2026
18:15 (20:15 UTC+4)

Belarus	0–2	Italy
	Report (FIFA); Report (UEFA)	Piemonte 66'; Polli 90+1'

David Petriashvili Stadium, Tbilisi (Georgia) (Note: Due to Belarusian involvement in the Russian invasion of Ukraine, Belarus are required to play their home matches at neutral venues, and behind closed doors, until further notice.)
Attendance: 0
Referee: Maïka Vanderstichel (France)
13 October 2026
18:15

Italy	1–1	Belarus
Bonansea 9'	Report (FIFA); Report (UEFA)	Olkhovik 75'

Stadio Artemio Franchi, Florence
Attendance: 3,373
Referee: Abigail Byrne (England)

Italy won 3–1 on aggregate.

=== Path 2 ===
==== Summary ====
Team 1	Agg.	Team 2	1st leg	2nd leg
Albania	0–4	Wales	0–1	0–3
Turkey	3–5	Slovenia	3–3	0–2
Slovakia	1–4	Ukraine	1–3	0–1
Israel	3–9	Switzerland	3–7	0–2
Belgium	3–3 (3–4 p)	Poland	1–0	2–3 (a.e.t.)
Czech Republic	2–5	Scotland	0–2	2–3
Northern Ireland	1–7	Portugal	0–4	1–3
Finland	6–2	Serbia	3–1	3–1

==== Matches ====
9 October 2026
18:00

Albania	0–1	Wales
	Report (FIFA); Report (UEFA)	Franja 22' (o.g.)

Loro Boriçi Stadium, Shkodër
Attendance: 642
Referee: Eleni Antoniou (Greece)
13 October 2026
20:15 (19:15 UTC+1)

Wales	3–0	Albania
Davies 34'; E. Hughes 50'; Cain 62'	Report (FIFA); Report (UEFA)

Parc y Scarlets, Llanelli
Attendance: 4,837
Referee: Alina Peşu (Romania)

Wales won 4–0 on aggregate.

9 October 2026
18:00 (19:00 UTC+3)

Turkey	3–3	Slovenia
Hançar 18'; Altunkulak 25', 75'	Report (FIFA); Report (UEFA)	Kajzba 62', 90+3'; Kastelec 81'

Pendik Stadium, Istanbul
Attendance: 874
Referee: Lina Lehtovaara (Finland)
13 October 2026
17:00

Slovenia	2–0	Turkey
Sternad 83'; Kastelec 90+3'	Report (FIFA); Report (UEFA)

Domžale Sports Park, Domžale
Attendance: 881
Referee: Maria Eugenia Gil Soriano (Spain)

Slovenia won 5–3 on aggregate.

9 October 2026
18:00

Slovakia	1–3	Ukraine
Šurnovská 42'	Report (FIFA); Report (UEFA)	Hiryn 10'; Andrukhiv 47'; Boychuk 52'

Futbal Tatran Arena, Prešov
Attendance: 1,907
Referee: Ivana Projkovska (North Macedonia)
13 October 2026
17:00

Ukraine	1–0	Slovakia
Andrukhiv 45'	Report (FIFA); Report (UEFA)

Košická futbalová aréna, Košice (Slovakia) (Note: Due to the Russian invasion of Ukraine, Ukraine are required to play their home matches at neutral venues until further notice.)
Attendance: 350
Referee: Ewa Augustyn (Poland)

Ukraine won 4–1 on aggregate.

9 October 2026
15:30

Israel	3–7	Switzerland
Sommer 20', 35', 53'	Report (FIFA); Report (UEFA)	Reuteler 14'; Beney 45+1'; Schertenleib 47'; Xhemaili 65', 72'; Kamber 90+1', 90+3'

Mezőkövesdi Városi Stadion, Mezőkövesd (Hungary) (Note: Due to the Middle Eastern crisis, Israel are required to play their home matches at neutral venues.)
Attendance: 28
Referee: Sofiya Prychyna (Ukraine)
13 October 2026
19:30

Switzerland	2–0	Israel
Beney 30'; Stierli 90+2'	Report (FIFA); Report (UEFA)

Stade de Tourbillon, Sion
Attendance: 3,548
Referee: Kirsty Dowle (England)

Switzerland won 9–3 on aggregate.

9 October 2026
20:15

Belgium	1–0	Poland
Dhont 45+1'	Report (FIFA); Report (UEFA)

Den Dreef, Leuven
Attendance: 6,238
Referee: Emanuela Rusta (Albania)
13 October 2026
18:00

Poland	3–2 (a.e.t.)	Belgium
Pajor 42', 116'; Tomasiak 67'	Report (FIFA); Report (UEFA)	Littel 51'; Teulings 105'
Penalties
Dudek (penalty scored); Pajor (penalty missed); Kamczyk (penalty scored); Achcińska (penalty scored); Padila (penalty scored)	4–3	(penalty scored) Wullaert; (penalty missed) Teulings; (penalty missed) Vanzeir; (penalty scored) Littel; (penalty scored) Cayman

Gdańsk Stadium, Gdańsk
Attendance: 7,740
Referee: Ivana Martinčić (Croatia)

3–3 on aggregate, Poland won 4–3 on penalties.

9 October 2026
19:00

Czech Republic	0–2	Scotland
	Report (FIFA); Report (UEFA)	Weir 57'; Emslie 65'

Stadion Arnošta Košťála, Pardubice
Attendance: 1,304
Referee: Hristiyana Guteva (Bulgaria)
13 October 2026
20:15 (19:15 UTC+1)

Scotland	3–2	Czech Republic
Davidson 5'; McGovern 49'; Grimshaw 72'	Report (FIFA); Report (UEFA)	Veselá 3'; Cahynová 33'

St. Mirren Park, Paisley
Attendance: 6,321
Referee: Maria Sole Ferrieri Caputi (Italy)

Scotland won 5–2 on aggregate.

9 October 2026
20:00 (19:00 UTC+1)

Northern Ireland	0–4	Portugal
	Report (FIFA); Report (UEFA)	Encarnação 8'; J. Silva 22'; Holloway 28' (o.g.); F. Pinto 83'

Inver Park, Larne
Attendance: 1,432
Referee: Iuliana Demetrescu (Romania)
13 October 2026
20:15 (19:15 UTC+1)

Portugal	3–1	Northern Ireland
Santiago 45+2'; Silva 74'; Costa 83'	Report (FIFA); Report (UEFA)	Elmore 31'

Estádio Municipal de Portimão, Portimão
Attendance: 1,739
Referee: Silvia Gasperotti (Italy)

Portugal won 7–1 on aggregate.

9 October 2026
17:30 (18:30 UTC+3)

Finland	3–1	Serbia
Koivisto 28'; Lindström 36'; Franssi 88'	Report (FIFA); Report (UEFA)	Milivojević 82'

Tammelan Stadion, Tampere
Attendance: 6,296
Referee: Catarina Campos (Portugal)
13 October 2026
17:00

Serbia	1–3	Finland
Summanen 27' (o.g.)	Report (FIFA); Report (UEFA)	Koivisto 3'; Lehtola 55'; Ulenius 89'

Serbian FA Sports Center, Stara Pazova
Attendance: 220
Referee: Marta Huerta De Aza (Spain)

Finland won 6–2 on aggregate.

== Round 2 ==
=== Summary ===
Team 1	Agg.	Team 2	1st leg	2nd leg
Ukraine		England	1 Dec	5 Dec
Finland		Italy	1 Dec	5 Dec
Portugal		Iceland	1 Dec	5 Dec
Wales		Norway	1 Dec	5 Dec
Switzerland		Austria	1 Dec	5 Dec
Scotland		Sweden	1 Dec	5 Dec
Poland		Republic of Ireland	1 Dec	5 Dec
Slovenia		Netherlands	1 Dec	5 Dec

=== Matches ===
1 December 2026
18:00

Ukraine	v	England
	Report (FIFA); Report (UEFA)

Pinatar Arena, San Pedro del Pinatar (Spain)
5 December 2026
18:30 (17:30 UTC+0)

England	v	Ukraine
	Report (FIFA); Report (UEFA)

Wembley Stadium, London

1 December 2026
17:30 (18:30 UTC+2)

Finland	v	Italy
	Report (FIFA); Report (UEFA)

Bolt Arena, Helsinki
5 December 2026
21:15

Italy	v	Finland
	Report (FIFA); Report (UEFA)

Erasmo Iacovone, Taranto

1 December 2026
18:00 (17:00 UTC+0)

Portugal	v	Iceland
	Report (FIFA); Report (UEFA)

Estádio D. Afonso Henriques, Guimarães
5 December 2026

Iceland	v	Portugal
	Report (FIFA); Report (UEFA)

Laugardalsvöllur, Reykjavik

1 December 2026
20:15 (19:15 UTC+0)

Wales	v	Norway
	Report (FIFA); Report (UEFA)

Cardiff City Stadium, Cardiff
5 December 2026
17:00

Norway	v	Wales
	Report (FIFA); Report (UEFA)

Ullevaal Stadion, Oslo

1 December 2026
19:00

Switzerland	v	Austria
	Report (FIFA); Report (UEFA)

Stadion Wankdorf, Bern
5 December 2026
16:10

Austria	v	Switzerland
	Report (FIFA); Report (UEFA)

Franz Horr Stadium, Vienna

1 December 2026
20:25 (19:25 UTC+0)

Scotland	v	Sweden
	Report (FIFA); Report (UEFA)

St Mirren Park, Paisley
5 December 2026
16:00

Sweden	v	Scotland
	Report (FIFA); Report (UEFA)

3Arena, Stockholm

1 December 2026
18:00

Poland	v	Republic of Ireland
	Report (FIFA); Report (UEFA)

Gdańsk Stadium, Gdańsk
5 December 2026
18:00 (17:00 UTC+0)

Republic of Ireland	v	Poland
	Report (FIFA); Report (UEFA)

Aviva Stadium, Dublin

1 December 2026
17:00

Slovenia	v	Netherlands
	Report (FIFA); Report (UEFA)

Domžale Sports Park, Domžale
5 December 2026
18:00

Netherlands	v	Slovenia
	Report (FIFA); Report (UEFA)

Stadion Galgenwaard, Utrecht

== Goalscorers ==
There have been 133 goals scored in 32 matches, for an average of 4.16 goals per match (as of 13 October 2026). Players highlighted in bold are still active in the competition.

5 goals

- (Sweden women's national football team) **Felicia Schröder**

4 goals

- (Netherlands women's national football team) **Lineth Beerensteyn**

3 goals

- (England women's national football team) **Alessia Russo**
- (Israel women's national football team) Talia Sommer
- (Netherlands women's national football team) **Victoria Pelova**
- (Norway women's national football team) **Elisabeth Terland**
- (Sweden women's national football team) **Stina Blackstenius**
- (Sweden women's national football team) **Amanda Ilestedt**

2 goals

- (England women's national football team) **Lauren James**
- (England women's national football team) **Georgia Stanway**
- (Finland women's national football team) **Emma Koivisto**
- (Iceland women's national football team) **Arna Eiríksdóttir**
- (Iceland women's national football team) **Hlín Eiríksdóttir**
- (Iceland women's national football team) **Dilja Zomers**
- (Netherlands women's national football team) **Esmee Brugts**
- (Netherlands women's national football team) **Damaris Egurrola**
- (Poland women's national football team) **Ewa Pajor**
- (Portugal women's national football team) **Jéssica Silva**
- (Republic of Ireland women's national football team) **Kyra Carusa**
- (Republic of Ireland women's national football team) **Jessie Stapleton**
- (Slovenia women's national football team) **Nina Kajzba**
- (Slovenia women's national football team) **Mirjam Kastelec**
- (Switzerland women's national football team) **Iman Beney**
- (Switzerland women's national football team) **Lia Kamber**
- (Switzerland women's national football team) **Riola Xhemaili**
- (Turkey women's national football team) Selen Altunkulak
- (Ukraine women's national football team) **Veronika Andrukhiv**

1 goal

- (Austria women's national football team) **Nicole Billa**
- (Austria women's national football team) **Eileen Campbell**
- (Austria women's national football team) **Marie Höbinger**
- (Austria women's national football team) **Virginia Kirchberger**
- (Austria women's national football team) **Sarah Puntigam**
- (Austria women's national football team) **Louise Schöffel**
- (Belarus women's national football team) Karyna Alkhovik
- (Belgium women's national football team) Elena Dhont
- (Belgium women's national football team) Amy Littel
- (Belgium women's national football team) Jarne Teulings
- (Czech Republic women's national football team) Klára Cahynová
- (Czech Republic women's national football team) Denisa Veselá
- (England women's national football team) **Maya Le Tissier**
- (Finland women's national football team) **Sanni Franssi**
- (Finland women's national football team) **Nea Lehtola**
- (Finland women's national football team) **Lotta Lindström**
- (Finland women's national football team) **Olivia Ulenius**
- (Greece women's national football team) Kallisti Brouksair
- (Iceland women's national football team) **Ída Marín Hermannsdóttir**
- (Iceland women's national football team) **Glódís Perla Viggósdóttir**
- (Iceland women's national football team) **Katla Tryggvadóttir**
- (Italy women's national football team) **Barbara Bonansea**
- (Italy women's national football team) **Martina Piemonte**
- (Italy women's national football team) **Elisa Polli**
- (Kosovo women's national football team) Erëleta Memeti
- (Northern Ireland women's national football team) Kess Elmore
- (Norway women's national football team) **Julie Blakstad**
- (Norway women's national football team) **Synne Jensen**
- (Norway women's national football team) **Frida Maanum**
- (Norway women's national football team) **Marthine Østenstad**
- (Norway women's national football team) **Guro Reiten**
- (Poland women's national football team) **Paulina Tomasiak**
- (Portugal women's national football team) **Carole Costa**
- (Portugal women's national football team) **Telma Encarnação**
- (Portugal women's national football team) **Fátima Pinto**
- (Portugal women's national football team) **Carolina Santiago**
- (Republic of Ireland women's national football team) **Jamie Finn**
- (Republic of Ireland women's national football team) **Shanade Hopcroft**
- (Republic of Ireland women's national football team) **Abbie Larkin**
- (Republic of Ireland women's national football team) **Katie McCabe**
- (Republic of Ireland women's national football team) **Emily Murphy**
- (Republic of Ireland women's national football team) **Chloe Mustaki**
- (Republic of Ireland women's national football team) **Denise O'Sullivan**
- (Republic of Ireland women's national football team) **Lucy Quinn**
- (Scotland women's national football team) **Lauren Davidson**
- (Scotland women's national football team) **Claire Emslie**
- (Scotland women's national football team) **Christy Grimshaw**
- (Scotland women's national football team) **Kathleen McGovern**
- (Scotland women's national football team) **Caroline Weir**
- (Serbia women's national football team) Vesna Milivojević
- (Slovakia women's national football team) Martina Šurnovská
- (Slovenia women's national football team) **Maja Sternad**
- (Sweden women's national football team) **Nathalie Björn**
- (Sweden women's national football team) **Smilla Holmberg**
- (Sweden women's national football team) **Hanna Lundkvist**
- (Switzerland women's national football team) **Géraldine Reuteler**
- (Switzerland women's national football team) **Sydney Schertenleib**
- (Switzerland women's national football team) **Julia Stierli**
- (Turkey women's national football team) Kader Hançar
- (Ukraine women's national football team) **Tanya Boychuk**
- (Ukraine women's national football team) **Viktoriya Hiryn**
- (Wales women's national football team) **Hannah Cain**
- (Wales women's national football team) **Mayzee Davies**
- (Wales women's national football team) **Elise Hughes**
- (Wales women's national football team) **Rachel Rowe**

1 own goal

- (Finland women's national football team) **Eveliina Summanen** (against Serbia)
- (Lithuania women's national football team) Meda Šeškutė (against Sweden)
- (Northern Ireland women's national football team) Rebecca Holloway (against Portugal)
