= Isabelle Iliano =

Belgian footballer

Personal information
- Date of birth: 2 March 1997 (age 29)
- Position: Defender

Team information
- Current team: Club YLA
- Number: 18

Youth career
- Eendracht Zele

Senior career*
Years	Team	Apps	(Gls)
2013–2019	Gent		
2019–2022	Club YLA	63	(3)
2022–2023	Fortuna Sittard	9	(0)
2023–	Club YLA	2	(0)

International career^{‡}
2012–2013	Belgium U17	10	(1)
2014–2015	Belgium U19	12	(2)
2014–	Belgium	17	(1)
- * Club domestic league appearances and goals as of 10:37, 1 September 2021 (UTC) ‡ National team caps and goals as of 15 October 2026

Isabelle Iliano (born 2 March 1997) is a Belgian footballer who plays as a defender for Belgian Women's Super League club Club YLA and the Belgium national team.

== Club career ==
In Belgium, Iliano played for KAA Gent in the BeNe League and Belgian Women's Super League, and for Club Brugge in the Belgian Women's Super League.

Iliano made her professional debut for Gent at a 16-year-old in a 1-0 BeNe League win over Utrecht on 30 August 2013.

Iliano featured in the Buffalos' first ever Cup success, a 3–1 victory over Anderlecht to win the 2017 Belgian Women's Cup Final. After being beaten 3–2 by Genk in the following year's Cup semi-final, Gent returned to the Cup Final in 2019, defeating Standard Fémina de Liège 2–0 with Mariam Toloba and Marie Minnaert scoring the goals.

In 2019, she moved to Club Brugge, playing 63 times in three seasons, before a move to Fortuna Sittard to play in the Dutch Eredivisie following in 2022. Iliano returned to Club YLA the following year.

== International career ==
Iliano represented Belgium at under-17 and under-19 levels, before being capped at senior level for the first time on 22 November 2014, in a 4–1 away win against Poland.

At the start of 2022, Iliano helped Belgium win the Pinatar Cup friendly tournament in Spain for the first time, coming on as substitute in two games, a 4–0 win over Slovakia and the decisive victory over Russia on penalties.

Iliano returned to contribute to Belgium's successful qualification for UEFA Women's Euro 2025 via the play-offs, and was selected in the squad for both legs of the play-off final against Ukraine.

On 11 June 2025, Iliano was called up to the Belgium squad for the UEFA Women's Euro 2025.

== International goals ==
No.	Date	Venue	Opponent	Score	Result	Competition
1.	9 June 2026	Stade de la Frontière, Esch-sur-Alzette, Luxembourg	Luxembourg	6–0	7–0	2027 FIFA Women's World Cup qualification

== Honours ==
Gent

- Belgian Women's Cup: 2017, 2019

Belgium

- Pinatar Cup: 2022
