= Nea Lehtola =

Finnish footballer (born 1998)

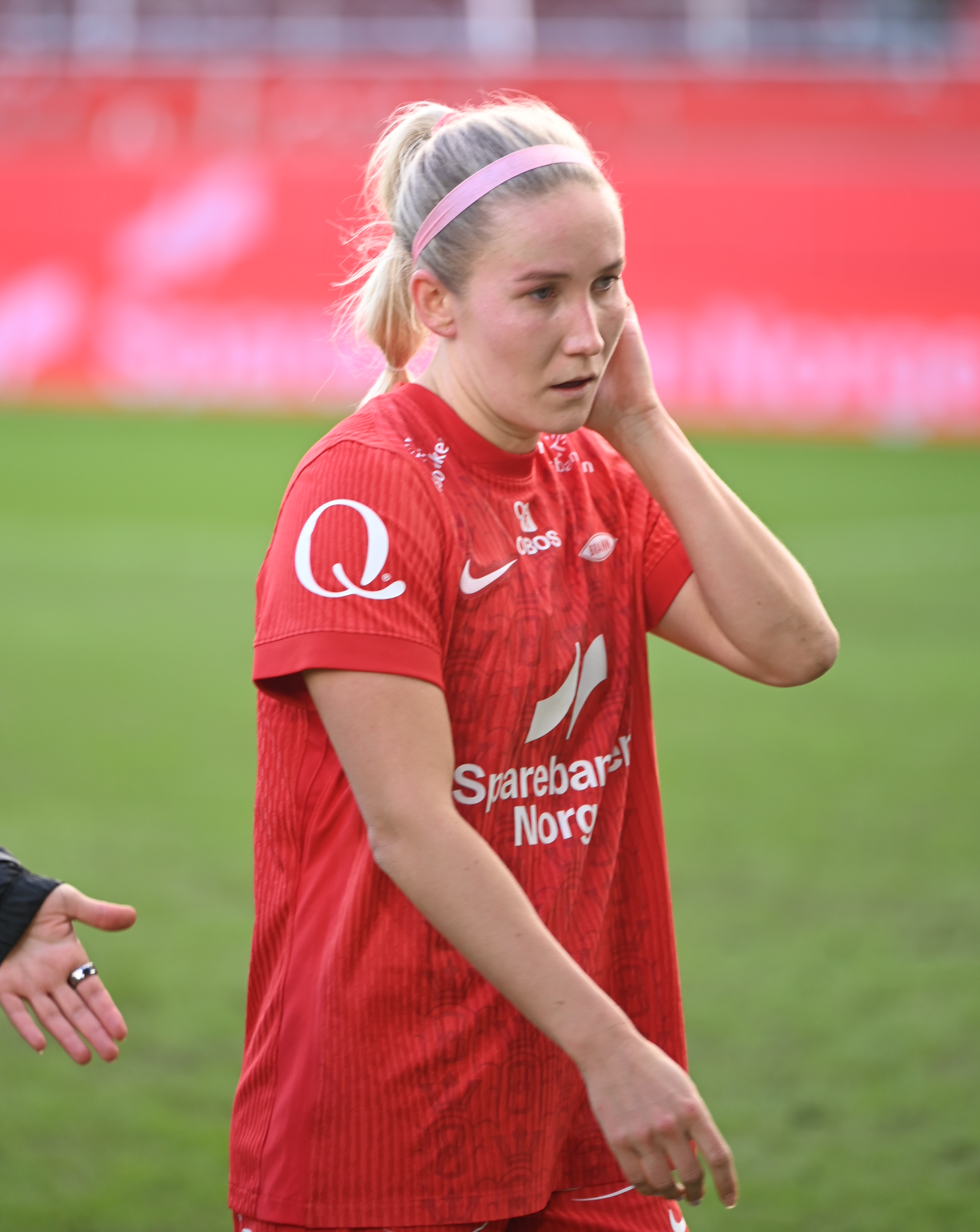
- Nea Lehtola in 2026

Personal information
- Full name: Nea Emilia Lehtola
- Date of birth: 24 October 1998 (age 28)
- Place of birth: Vimpeli, Finland
- Height: 1.64 m (5 ft 5 in)
- Positions: Defender; midfielder

Team information
- Current team: Brann

Senior career*
Years	Team	Apps	(Gls)
2015–2018	Ilves	62	(4)
2019–2022	HJK	64	(7)
2022–2024	Brøndby IF	36	(4)
2024–	Brann	24	(0)

International career^{‡}
2016–2017	Finland U19	8	(1)
2017	Finland U20	1	(0)
2020–	Finland	28	(6)
- * Club domestic league appearances and goals as of 3 July 2025 ‡ National team caps and goals as of 15 October 2026

Nea Emilia Lehtola (Finnish: ['neɑ 'emiliɑ 'lehtolɑ] born 24 October 1998) is a Finnish footballer who plays as a defender or midfielder for Toppserien club Brann and the Finland women's national team.

== Club career ==
=== Ilves ===
Lehtola made her league debut against PK-35 Vantaa on 1 April 2016. She scored her first league goal against NiceFutis on 3 September 2016, scoring in the 42nd minute. On 22 October 2017, Lehtola signed a new deal with the club.

=== HJK ===
Lehtola made her league debut against ONS Oulu on 23 March 2019. She scored her first league goal against PK-35 Vantaa on 13 June 2020, scoring in the 84th minute. On 4 December 2020, Lehtola signed a new deal with the club. On 7 December 2021, she signed a new deal with the club.

=== Brøndby IF ===
On 28 July 2022, it was announced that Lehtola had joined Brøndby IF. She made her league debut against Køge on 7 August 2022. Lehtola scored her first league goal against AGF Fodbold on 5 November 2022, scoring in the 44th minute.

=== Brann ===
On 27 June 2024, Lehtola signed with Norwegian Toppserien club Brann until the end of 2026.

== International career ==
Lehtola made her international debut against Croatia on 8 March 2020.

Lehtola was called up to the 2020 Cyprus Women's Cup, replacing Olga Ahtinen on 29 February 2020.

On 19 June 2025, Lehtola was called up to the Finland squad for the UEFA Women's Euro 2025.

== Career statistics ==
=== Club ===
As of 3 July 2025

Appearances and goals by club, season and competition
Club	Season	League			Cup (Note: Includes Finnish Women's Cup and Norwegian Women's Cup)		Europe		Total	
Club	Season	Division	Apps	Goals	Apps	Goals	Apps	Goals	Apps	Goals
Nokia	2014	Naisten Kakkonen	1	0	–		–		1	0
Ilves	2016	Naisten Liiga	19	1	2	0	–		21	1
Ilves	2017	Naisten Liiga	19	2	1	0	–		20	2
Ilves	2018	Naisten Liiga	24	1	1	0	–		25	1
Ilves	Total		62	4	4	0	0	0	66	4
HJK Helsinki	2019	Naisten Liiga	23	0	5	0	–		28	0
HJK Helsinki	2020	Kansallinen Liiga	16	4	4	0	1 (Note: Appearance(s) in UEFA Women's Champions League)	0	21	4
HJK Helsinki	2021	Kansallinen Liiga	13	1	3	3	–		16	4
HJK Helsinki	2022	Kansallinen Liiga	12	2	5	3	–		17	5
HJK Helsinki	Total		64	7	17	6	1	0	82	13
Brøndby IF	2022–23	Danish Women's League	22	3	0	0	–		22	3
Brøndby IF	2023–24	Danish Women's League	14	1	0	0	2	0	16	1
Brøndby IF	Total		36	4	0	0	2	0	38	4
Brann	2024	Toppserien	10	0	2	0	0	0	12	0
Brann	2025	Toppserien	14	0	2	0	0	0	16	0
Brann	Total		24	0	4	0	0	0	28	0
Career total			177	15	27	6	3	0	207	21

=== International ===
As of match played 3 June 2025

Finland
Year	Apps	Goals
2020	1	0
2021	0	0
2022	0	0
2023	1	0
2024	5	2
2025	6	1
Total	13	3

=== International goals ===
Scores and results list Finland's goal tally first, score column indicates score after each Lehtola goal.

List of international goals scored by Nea Lehtola
No.	Date	Venue	Opponent	Score	Result	Competition
1.	29 October 2024	Tammelan Stadion, Tampere, Finland	Montenegro	2–0	5–0	UEFA Women's Euro 2025 qualifying play-offs
2.	3 December 2024	Bolt Arena, Helsinki, Finland	Scotland	2–0	2–0	UEFA Women's Euro 2025 qualifying play-offs
3.	3 June 2025	Helsinki Olympic Stadium, Helsinki, Finland	Serbia	1–0	1–1	2025 UEFA Women's Nations League
4.	9 June 2026	Tammelan Stadion, Tampere, Finland	Portugal	1–0	3–1	2027 FIFA Women's World Cup qualification
5.	9 June 2026	Tammelan Stadion, Tampere, Finland	Portugal	2–1	3–1	2027 FIFA Women's World Cup qualification
6.	13 October 2026	Serbian FA Sports Center, Stara Pazova, Serbia	Serbia	2–1	3–1	2027 FIFA Women's World Cup play-offs

== Honours ==
HJK

- Naisten Liiga: 2019
- Finnish Women's Cup: 2019
