= Iman Beney =

Swiss footballer (born 2006)

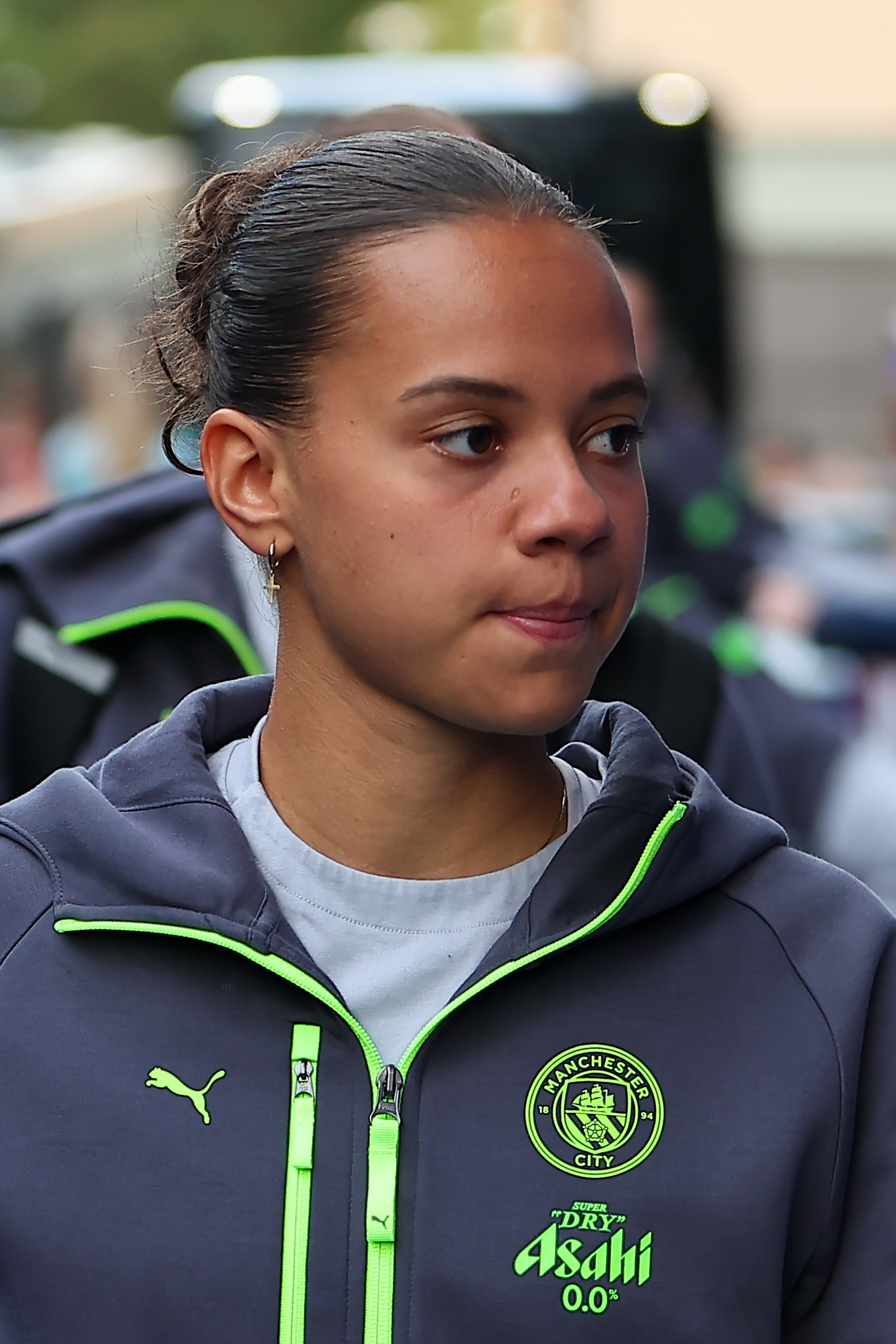
- Beney in 2025

Personal information
- Full name: Iman Beney
- Date of birth: 23 July 2006 (age 20)
- Place of birth: Yverdon-les-Bains, Switzerland
- Height: 1.60 m (5 ft 3 in)
- Positions: Midfielder; forward

Team information
- Current team: Manchester City
- Number: 24

Youth career
- 2014–2020: FC Savièse
- 2020–2021: FC Sion
- 2020–2022: FC Saxon Sports
- 2021–2022: BSC YB Frauen

Senior career*
| Years | Team | Apps | (Gls) |
| 2022–2025 | BSC YB Frauen | 40 | (14) |
| 2025– | Manchester City | 24 | (3) |

International career^{‡}
| 2022 | Switzerland U16 | 2 | (0) |
| 2021– | Switzerland U17 | 13 | (9) |
| 2022– | Switzerland U19 | 8 | (1) |
| 2023– | Switzerland | 25 | (5) |
- * Club domestic league appearances and goals as of 22:20, 22 November 2026 (UTC) ‡ National team caps and goals as of 08:35, 14 October 2026 (UTC)

Iman Beney (French: [i.mɑ̃ be.nɛ]; born 23 July 2006) is a Swiss professional footballer who plays as a forward for Women's Super League club Manchester City and the Swiss national team.

== Club career ==
Beney started her senior career at BSC YB Frauen, where she won the 2024–25 Super League. In June 2025, she joined English Super League club Manchester City by signing a four-year contract. On 4 October 2025, she scored her first goal, a late winner vs Arsenal in a 3–2 win in the Women's Super League.

== International career ==
Beney represented Switzerland at youth level. She reached the semi-finals with Switzerland U17 during the 2023 UEFA Under-17 Championship.

Beney made her international debut against Zambia in a 3–3 tie. Beney was the youngest member of the Swiss 2023 FIFA World Cup squad. However, she ruptured her anterior cruciate ligament in training and was replaced by Amira Arfaoui.

On 23 June 2025, Beney was called up to the Switzerland squad for the UEFA Euro 2025. She started in every game, advancing to the quarter-finals. However Switzerland lost 2–0 against eventual finalists Spain.

== Personal life ==
Beney is of Brazilian descent via her mother. Beney's father Nicolas Beney was a professional football player, as was her aunt Noémie Beney. Her older brother Roméo is also a professional footballer and plays for Basel in the Swiss Super League.

== Career statistics ==
=== Club ===
As of match played 22 November 2026

Appearances and goals by club, season and competition
| Club | Season | League | | | National cup (Note: Includes Swiss Women's Cup, Women's FA Cup) | | League cup (Note: Includes Women's League Cup) | | Continental (Note: Includes UEFA Women's Champions League) | | Total | |
| Club | Season | Division | Apps | Goals | Apps | Goals | Apps | Goals | Apps | Goals | Apps | Goals |
|---|---|---|---|---|---|---|---|---|---|---|---|---|
| BSC YB Frauen | 2022–23 | Swiss Women's Super League | 18 | 6 | 1 | 0 | — | | — | | 19 | 6 |
| BSC YB Frauen | 2023–24 | Swiss Women's Super League | 0 | 0 | 0 | 0 | — | | — | | 0 | 0 |
| BSC YB Frauen | 2024–25 | Swiss Women's Super League | 22 | 8 | 3 | 2 | — | | — | | 25 | 10 |
| BSC YB Frauen | Total | | 40 | 14 | 4 | 2 | 0 | 0 | 0 | 0 | 44 | 16 |
| Manchester City | 2025–26 | Women's Super League | 16 | 2 | 4 | 0 | 5 | 0 | — | | 25 | 2 |
| Manchester City | 2026–27 | Women's Super League | 8 | 1 | 0 | 0 | — | | 2 | 0 | 10 | 1 |
| Manchester City | Total | | 24 | 3 | 4 | 0 | 5 | 0 | 2 | 0 | 35 | 3 |
| Career total | | | 64 | 17 | 8 | 2 | 5 | 0 | 2 | 0 | 79 | 19 |

=== International ===
As of match played 13 October 2026

Appearances and goals by national team and year
| National team | Year | Apps | Goals |
|---|---|---|---|
| Switzerland | 2023 | 1 | 0 |
| Switzerland | 2024 | 4 | 0 |
| Switzerland | 2025 | 14 | 2 |
| Switzerland | 2026 | 5 | 3 |
| Total | | 25 | 5 |

Scores and results list Switzerland's goal tally first, score column indicates score after each Beney goal.

List of international goals scored by Iman Beney
| No. | Date | Venue | Opponent | Score | Result | Competition |
|---|---|---|---|---|---|---|
| 1 | 28 October 2025 | East End Park, Dunfermline, Scotland | Scotland | 2–1 | 4–3 | Friendly |
| 2 | 2 December 2025 | Estadio Municipal de Chapín, Jerez, Spain | Wales | 2–3 | 2–3 | Friendly |
| 3 | 7 March 2026 | Centenary Stadium, Ta' Qali, Malta | Malta | 1–0 | 4–1 | 2027 FIFA Women's World Cup qualification |
| 4 | 9 October 2026 | Mezőkövesdi Városi Stadion, Mezőkövesd, Hungary | Israel | 2–2 | 7–3 | 2027 FIFA Women's World Cup qualification play-offs |
| 5 | 13 October 2026 | Stade de Tourbillon, Sion, Switzerland | Israel | 1–0 | 2–0 | 2027 FIFA Women's World Cup qualification play-offs |

== Honours ==
BSC YB Frauen

- Swiss Women's Super League: 2024–25

Manchester City

- Women's Super League: 2025–26

Individual

- UEFA Women's Under-17 Championship Team of the Tournament: 2023
- Women's Super League Team of the Season: 2024–25
