= Saar Janssen =

Belgian footballer

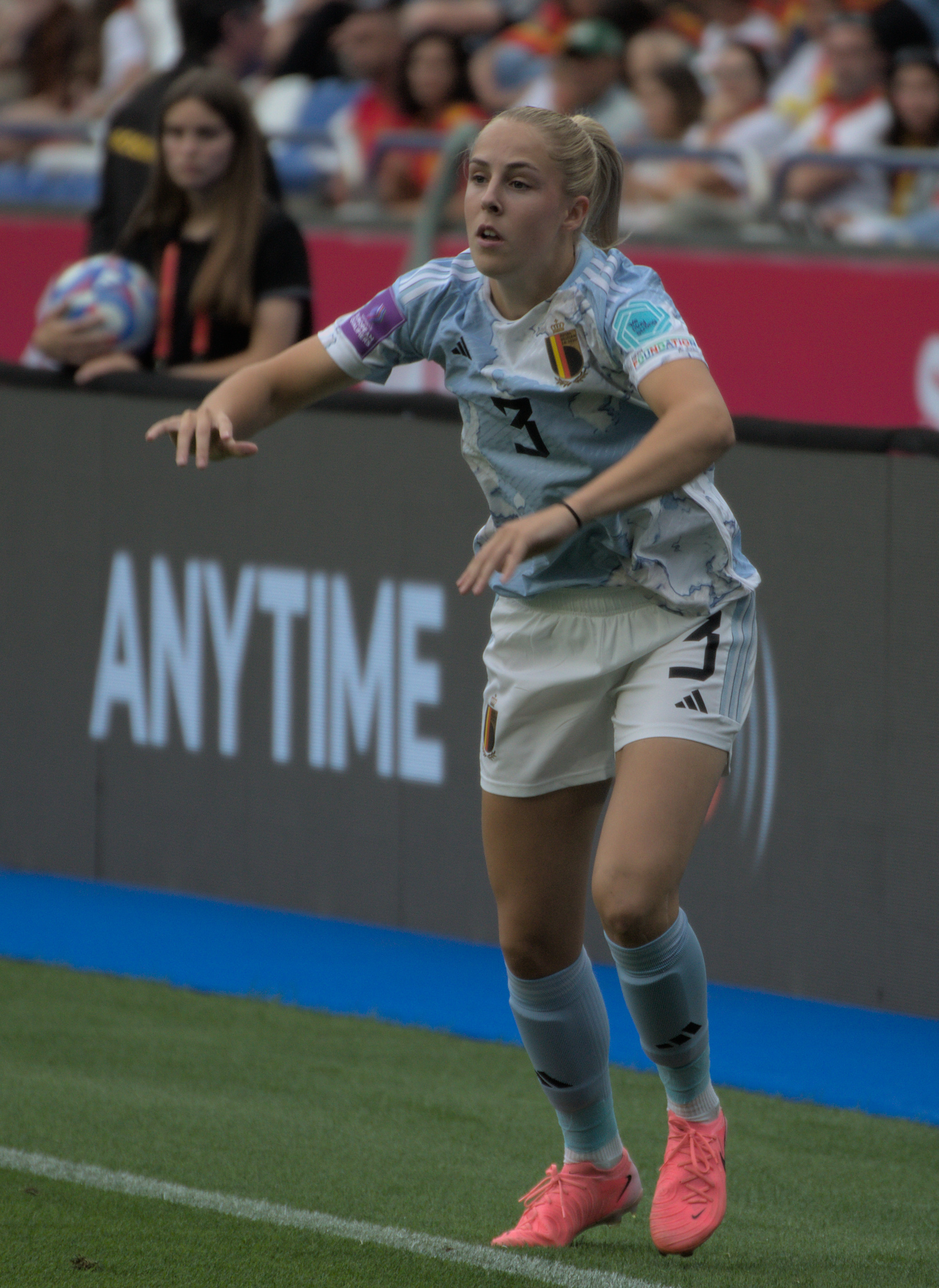
- Janssen in 2024

Personal information
- Date of birth: 22 July 2005 (age 21)
- Place of birth: Belgium
- Position: Defender

Team information
- Current team: OH Leuven

Senior career*
Years	Team	Apps	(Gls)
2021-	OH Leuven	41	(6)

International career^{‡}
2021-2022	Belgium U17	7	(0)
2023–2024	Belgium U19	9	(1)
2024	Belgium U23	1	(0)
2024-	Belgium	14	(1)
- * Club domestic league appearances and goals as of 19 November 2024 ‡ National team caps and goals as of 15 October 2026

Saar Janssen (born 22 July 2005) is a Belgian footballer. She plays as a defender for OH Leuven in the Belgian Women's Super League.

Janssen helped OH Leuven to back-to-back runners-up places in the Super League in 2021-22 and 2022–23 as Anderlecht took the title both times, completing a seven-in-a-row. She finished third in the Super League with OHL in 2023–24, having won the regular season, but were overhauled in the title play-offs.

Janssen made her debut for the Belgium senior national women's team, the Red Flames, on 4 June 2024, coming on as a substitute for Janice Cayman in a 1–1 home draw against the Czech Republic in a UEFA Women's Euro 2025 qualifier at the Stayen in Sint-Truiden.

She was handed her first senior starts for Belgium by national team coach Ives Serneels for both legs of the Euro 2025 play-off semi-final against Greece, drawing 0–0 in Athens, winning the return 5–0 at her home ground Den Dreef in Leuven.

Janssen went on to contribute to Belgium's successful qualification for UEFA Women's Euro 2025 via the play-offs, starting both legs of the play-off final against Ukraine.

== International ==
As of match played 9 October 2026

Scores and results list Belgium's goal tally first, score column indicates score after each Janssen goal.

List of international goals scored by Saar Janssen
No.	Date	Venue	Opponent	Score	Result	Competition
1	3 March 2026	BSC Stadium, Budaörs, Hungary	Israel	3–0	3–0	2027 FIFA Women's World Cup qualification
