= Stade de Tourbillon =

Multi-purpose stadium in Sion, Switzerland

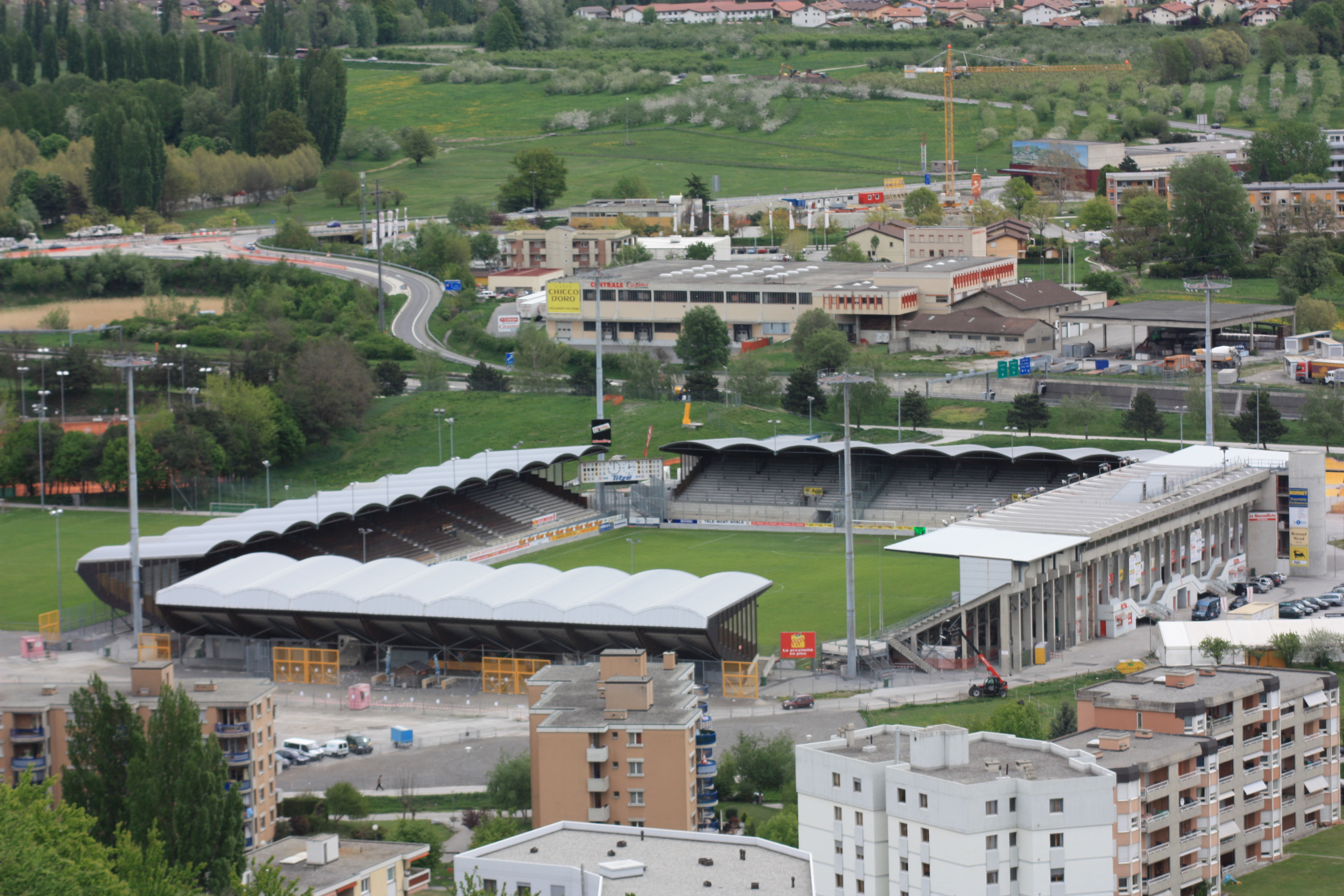
- Interactive map of Stade de Tourbillon
- Full name: Stade de Tourbillon
- Location: Sion, Valais, Switzerland
- Coordinates: 46°14′00″N 7°22′35″E
- Owner: City of Sion
- Capacity: 14,283
- Surface: Grass

Construction
- Built: 11 August 1968
- Renovated: 1989

Tenant
- FC Sion

The Stade de Tourbillon is a multi-purpose stadium in Sion, Switzerland. It is currently used mostly for football matches and is the home stadium of FC Sion. The stadium holds 16,000 people and was built in 1968 and renovated in 1989. At the time of the renovation, its capacity was 19,600. The stadium's LED scoreboard is powered by ColosseoEAS's miniDirector coupled with a miniTimer.

== International matches ==
Date		Result		Competition
27 March 1985	Switzerland	0–2	Czechoslovakia	Friendly
6 September 1994	Switzerland	1–0	United Arab Emirates	Friendly
1 June 2010	Switzerland	0–1	Costa Rica	Friendly
4 June 2010	Japan	0–2	Ivory Coast	Friendly
31 May 2014	Algeria	3–1	Armenia	Friendly
8 September 2019	Switzerland	4–0	Gibraltar	UEFA Euro 2020 qualifying
3 July 2025	Belgium	0–1	Italy	UEFA Women's Euro 2025
6 July 2025	Norway	2–1	Finland	UEFA Women's Euro 2025
11 July 2025	Portugal	1–2	Belgium	UEFA Women's Euro 2025
13 October 2026	Switzerland	2–0	Israel	2027 FIFA Women's World Cup qualifying
