= Martina Šurnovská =

Slovak footballer (born 1999)

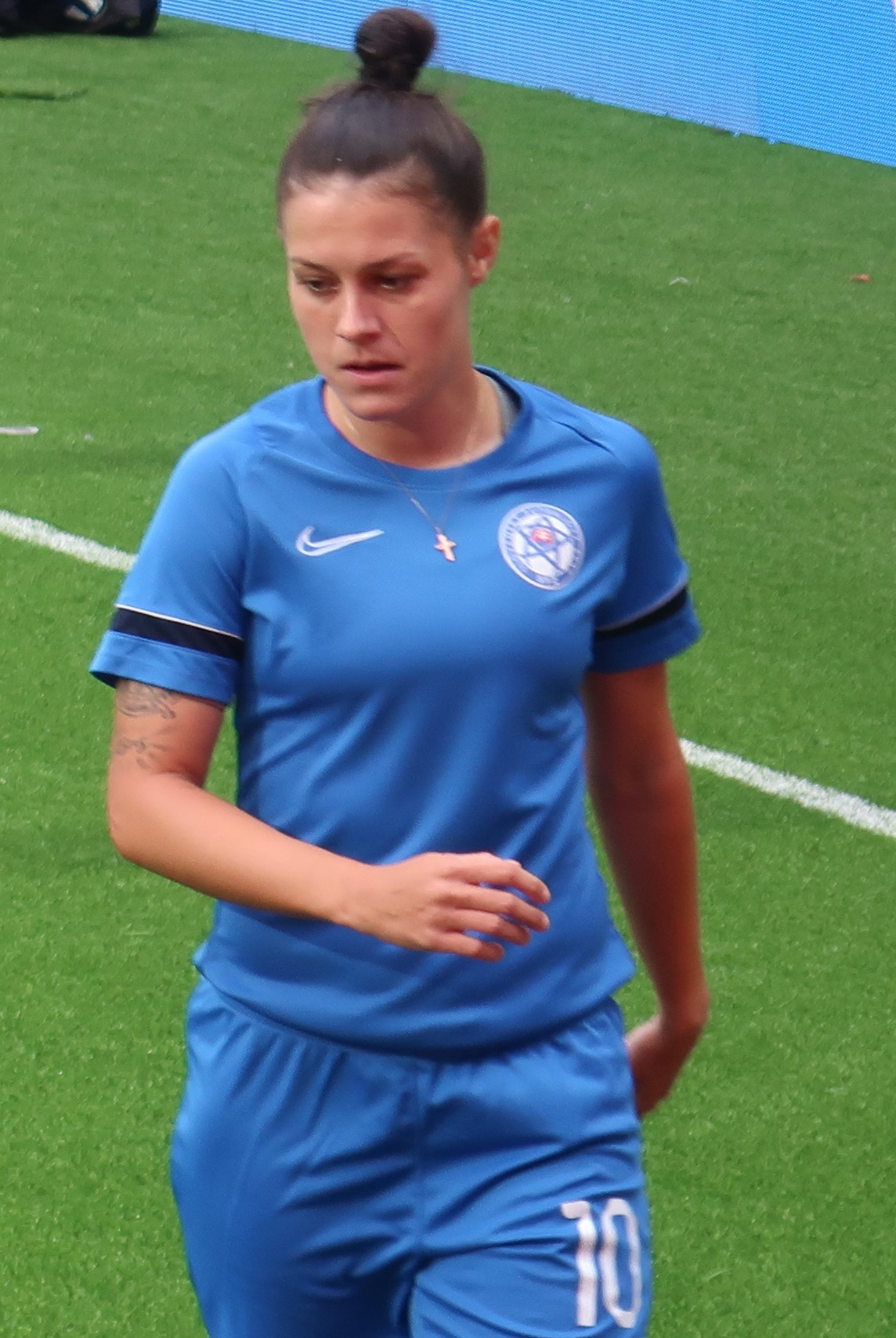
- Šurnovská with Slovakia in 2023

Personal information
- Date of birth: 10 February 1999 (age 27)
- Position: Midfielder

Team information
- Current team: GKS Katowice

Youth career
- Slovan Duslo Šaľa
- Slavia Prague

Senior career*
Years	Team	Apps	(Gls)
- Partizán Bardejov
2016–2019	Slovan Bratislava		
2019–2020	Apollon Ladies		
2020–2026	Slavia Prague		
2026–	GKS Katowice	0	(0)

International career^{‡}
2017–	Slovakia	84	(10)
- * Club domestic league appearances and goals as of 19:18, 6 July 2026 (UTC) ‡ National team caps and goals as of 16:52, 10 October 2026 (UTC)

Martina Šurnovská (born 10 February 1999) is a Slovak professional footballer who plays as a midfielder for Ekstraliga club GKS Katowice and the Slovakia women's national team.

== Career ==
Šurnovská has been capped for the Slovakia national team, appearing for the team during the 2019 FIFA Women's World Cup qualifying cycle.

== Career statistics ==
=== International ===
Scores and results list Slovakia's goal tally first, score column indicates score after each Šurnovská goal.

List of international goals scored by Martina Šurnovská
No.	Date	Venue	Opponent	Score	Result	Competition
1	7 August 2015	Senec, Slovakia	United Arab Emirates		6–0	Friendly
2	14 June 2021	Senec, Slovakia	Romania	3–1	3–1	Friendly
3	26 October 2021	NTC Poprad, Poprad, Slovakia	Georgia	2–0	2–0	2023 FIFA World Cup qualification
4	25 November 2021	Tallaght Stadium, Dublin, Ireland	Republic of Ireland	1–0	1–1	2023 FIFA World Cup qualification
5	8 April 2022	Anton Malatinský Stadium, Trnava, Slovakia	Finland	1–1	1–1	2023 FIFA World Cup qualification
6	1 September 2022	Tengiz Burjanadze Stadium, Gori, Georgia	Georgia	3–0	4–0	2023 FIFA World Cup qualification
7	31 May 2024	Čukarički Stadium, Belgrade, Serbia	Serbia	1–0	1–2	UEFA Euro 2025 qualifying
8	25 October 2024	NTC Poprad, Poprad, Slovakia	Wales	1–0	2–1	UEFA Euro 2025 qualifying play-offs
9	3 March 2026	NTC Poprad, Poprad, Slovakia	Latvia	2–0	3–2	2027 FIFA World Cup qualification
10	9 October 2026	Futbal Tatran Arena, Prešov, Slovakia	Ukraine	1–3	1–3	2027 FIFA Women's World Cup qualification play-offs

== Honours ==
Slavia Prague

- Czech Women's First League: 2021–22, 2022–23, 2023–24, 2024–25
- Czech Women's Cup: 2021–22, 2022–23, 2023–24, 2024–25
