= Sinop City Stadium =

Football stadium in Sinop, Turkey

- Interactive map of Sinop City Stadium
- Full name: Sinop Şehir Stadyumu
- Location: Sinop, Turkey
- Coordinates: 42°01′20″N 35°07′29″E
- Capacity: 10,000

Construction
- Groundbreaking: 2019
- Built: December 2019–August 2023
- Opened: 27 November 2024; 22 months ago
- Cost: ₺33m (approx US$1.2m)
- Architect: MVM Mimarlık Mühendislik studio

Tenant
- Sinopspor

The Sinop City Stadium (Turkish: Sinop Şehir Stadyumu) is a stadium in Sinop, northern Turkey. It is currently used mostly for football matches and is the home ground of Sinopspor. The stadium has a capacity of 10,000 spectators. It opened in 2024.

== Overview ==
The Sinop City Stadium is located at Bostancılı Neighborhood of Merkez (Central) District in Sinop, northern Turkey, on the coast of Black Sea, around 100 m (330 ft) far from the sea.

The stadium was designed by MVM Mimarlık Mühendislik studio, and built on the site of the 1974-built Dokuzoğlu City Stadium, the old municipal stadium, which was demolished in the summer of 2018. The construction began end December 2019, and was planned to be completed in July 2021. It was built by the Ministry of Youth and Sports. Stretching over an area of 22 daa (22,000 m^{2}), the construction cost amounted ₺33m (approx. US$1.2m). The stadium has U-shaped stands that surround the running track on the west, north and east sides. Only a high wall remains on the southern curve. The facility features also two multi-purpose indoor arenas. The venue has a seating capacity of around 7,800, and can hold 10,000 spectators. The stands are fully covered, with folding seats in white or purple, the colors of the local football club, arranged in a mosaic pattern. The running track has a tartan surface. There are four tracks around the perimeter and six on the main running straight. The pitch turf is a hybrid and is equipped with a heating system. The venue is home ground of the football club Sinopspor.

The construction of the stadium was completed late August 2023 except for the lines on the lawn. However, its delivery process required driving piles on the sea side for stabilization purposes due to its proximity to the beach. The satdium officially opened on 27 November 2024 hosting the first football match of Turkish Regional Amateur League between Sinopspor and Geredespor.

== International competitions hosted ==
The first international match in the stadium was played by Turkey women's national team in a 2027 FIFA Women's World Cup qualification – UEFA League B game against Switzerland on 18 April 2026 that ended with a draw of 1–1.
