= 2027 FIFA Women's World Cup qualification – UEFA League B =

Tournament details
- Dates: 3 March – 9 June 2026
- Teams: 16

Tournament statistics
- Matches played: 48
- Goals scored: 194 (4.04 per match)
- Attendance: 108,950 (2,270 per match)
- Top scorer(s): (Scotland) Caroline Weir (10 goals)
- Women's Nations League Women's World Cup qualifying

League B of the Women's European Qualifiers will determine twelve of the teams to advance to the play-off phase.

== Format ==
The teams ranked 17–32 in the 2025 UEFA Women's Nations League overall phase ranking were drawn into four groups of four teams each. Each group will be contested in a league format where each team plays each other team at home and away.

All group winners, runners-up, and third-place teams will advance to the play-off phase. In addition, the four group winners will be promoted to League A, while all fourth-place teams and the two lowest-ranked third-place teams will be relegated to League C, for the following 2027 UEFA Women's Nations League.

=== Schedule ===
The match schedule will be as follows:

Matchday	Date
Matchday 1	3 March 2026
Matchday 2	7 March 2026
Matchday 3	14 April 2026
Matchday 4	18 April 2026
Matchday 5	5 June 2026
Matchday 6	9 June 2026

== Seeding ==
Teams were allocated to League B according to the 2025 Women's Nations League overall phase rankings and were seeded into four pots of four teams. The draw for the league phase took place on 4 November 2025 at 13:00 CET.

Pot 1
Team	Rank
Belgium (Note: Belgium, Czech Republic, Finland, and Northern Ireland participated in the League A vs League B promotion/relegation matches in October 2025 to determine each team's league allocation.)	17
Portugal	18
Wales	19
Switzerland	20

Pot 2
Team	Rank
Scotland	21
Czech Republic	22
Finland	23
Northern Ireland	24

Pot 3
Team	Rank
Albania (Note: Albania and Turkey participated in the League B vs League C promotion/relegation matches in October 2025 to determine each team's league allocation.)	25
Turkey	26
Slovakia	27
Israel	28

Pot 4
Team	Rank
Luxembourg	29
Malta	30
Montenegro	31
Latvia	32

== Groups ==
The fixture list was confirmed by UEFA following the draw. Times are CET/CEST, (Note: CET (UTC+1) for matches until 29 March 2026 (matchdays 1–2), and CEST (UTC+2) for matches thereafter (matchdays 3–6).) as listed by UEFA (local times, if different, are in parentheses).

=== Group B1 ===
Pos	Team	Pld	W	D	L	GF	GA	GD	Pts	Promotion, qualification or relegation	(Wales)	(Czech Republic)	(Albania)	(Montenegro)
1	Wales (P)	6	4	2	0	17	5	+12	14	Advance to play-offs and promotion to League A	—	3–1	4–0	6–1
2	Czech Republic	6	3	2	1	18	8	+10	11	Advance to play-offs	2–2	—	1–1	5–0
3	Albania	6	2	1	3	9	14	−5	7	Advance to play-offs	0–1	1–5	—	5–2
4	Montenegro (R)	6	0	1	5	6	23	−17	1	Relegation to League C	1–1	1–4	1–2	—

Source: UEFA
Rules for classification: Tiebreakers
(P) Promoted; (R) Relegated
3 March 2026
14:00

Montenegro	1–2	Albania
Kuč 67'	Report (FIFA); Report (UEFA)	Doçi 70', 76'

Gradski stadion, Nikšić
Attendance: 350
Referee: Miriama Bočková (Slovakia)
3 March 2026
18:30

Czech Republic	2–2	Wales
Bartoňová 16'; Žufánková 54'	Report (FIFA); Report (UEFA)	Cain 30'; E. Hughes 90+3'

Městský fotbalový stadion, Uherské Hradiště
Attendance: 2,358
Referee: Volha Blotskaya (Belarus)

7 March 2026
16:30 (15:30 UTC)

Wales	6–1	Montenegro
Cain 6', 35'; Rowe 15'; Griffiths 17', 78'; Ingle 31'	Report (FIFA); Report (UEFA)	Kuč 51'

Parc y Scarlets, Llanelli
Attendance: 4,550
Referee: Caroline Lanssens (Belgium)
7 March 2026
18:00

Albania	1–5	Czech Republic
F. Berisha 18'	Report (FIFA); Report (UEFA)	Cvrčková 14', 68'; Khýrová 37', 62'; Černá 50'

Loro Boriçi Stadium, Shkodër
Attendance: 743
Referee: Lotta Vuorio (Finland)

14 April 2026
17:30

Czech Republic	5–0	Montenegro
Kalač 9' (o.g.); Černá 13'; Cahynová 30', 65'; Polášková 50'	Report (FIFA); Report (UEFA)

Letní stadion, Chomutov
Attendance: 1,221
Referee: Tatyana Sorokopudova (Kazakhstan)
14 April 2026
20:15

Wales	4–0	Albania
Cain 15', 55'; E. Hughes 35'; Roberts 48'	Report (FIFA); Report (UEFA)

Racecourse Ground, Wrexham
Attendance: 4,485
Referee: Katalin Sipos (Hungary)

18 April 2026
16:00

Montenegro	1–4	Czech Republic
Bulatović 24' (pen.)	Report (FIFA); Report (UEFA)	Cahynová 7'; Khýrová 38'; Švíbková 67'; K. Dubcová 70' (pen.)

Gradski stadion, Nikšić
Attendance: 100
Referee: Louise Thompson (Northern Ireland)
18 April 2026
18:00

Albania	0–1	Wales
	Report (FIFA); Report (UEFA)	Roberts 28'

Elbasan Arena, Elbasan
Attendance: 538
Referee: Lizzy van der Helm (Netherlands)

5 June 2026
17:30

Czech Republic	1–1	Albania
Cahynová 47'	Report (FIFA); Report (UEFA)	Levendi 70'

FK Viktoria Stadion, Prague
Attendance: 1,453
Referee: Franziska Wildfeuer (Germany)
5 June 2026
18:00

Montenegro	1–1	Wales
Djoković 79'	Report (FIFA); Report (UEFA)	Cain 41' (pen.)

Podgorica City Stadium, Podgorica
Attendance: 400
Referee: Henrikke Nervik (Norway)

9 June 2026
19:00 (18:00 UTC+1)

Wales	3–1	Czech Republic
Woodham 9'; Evans 49'; Griffiths 72'	Report (FIFA); Report (UEFA)	Khýrová 5'

Cardiff City Stadium, Cardiff
Attendance: 5,607
Referee: Deborah Bianchi (Italy)
9 June 2026
19:00

Albania	5–2	Montenegro
Doçi 24' (pen.), 63'; F. Berisha 45+4'; G. Berisha 68'; Bajraktari 70'	Report (FIFA); Report (UEFA)	Dešić 20'; Djoković 45'

Loro Boriçi Stadium, Shkodër
Attendance: 431
Referee: Emily Heaslip (England)

=== Group B2 ===
Pos	Team	Pld	W	D	L	GF	GA	GD	Pts	Promotion, qualification or relegation	(Switzerland)	(Turkey)	(Northern Ireland)	(Malta)
1	Switzerland (P)	6	5	1	0	18	5	+13	16	Advance to play-offs and promotion to League A	—	3–1	2–0	6–1
2	Turkey	6	4	1	1	11	5	+6	13	Advance to play-offs	1–1	—	2–1	3–0
3	Northern Ireland	6	2	0	4	10	9	+1	6	Advance to play-offs	1–2	0–1	—	4–0
4	Malta (R)	6	0	0	6	4	24	−20	0	Relegation to League C	1–4	0–3	2–4	—

Source: UEFA
Rules for classification: Tiebreakers
(P) Promoted; (R) Relegated
3 March 2026
15:00 (17:00 UTC+3)

Turkey	3–0	Malta
L. Farrugia 7' (o.g.); Topçu 29'; Karabulut 88'	Report (FIFA); Report (UEFA)

Pendik Stadium, Istanbul
Attendance: 275
Referee: Eugenia Gil Soriano (Spain)
3 March 2026
19:00

Switzerland	2–0	Northern Ireland
Xhemaili 22'; Fölmli 90+1'	Report (FIFA); Report (UEFA)

Stade de la Tuilière, Lausanne
Attendance: 4,165
Referee: Shona Shukrula (Netherlands)

7 March 2026
19:00

Malta	1–4	Switzerland
M. Farrugia 19'	Report (FIFA); Report (UEFA)	Beney 8'; Lehmann 10'; Fölmli 39'; Schertenleib 73'

Centenary Stadium, Ta' Qali
Attendance: 905
Referee: Jelena Medjedovic (Serbia)
7 March 2026
20:00 (19:00 UTC)

Northern Ireland	0–1	Turkey
	Report (FIFA); Report (UEFA)	Türkoğlu 24'

Mourneview Park, Lurgan
Attendance: 2,186
Referee: Olivia Tschon (Austria)

14 April 2026
19:00

Switzerland	3–1	Turkey
Csillag 49', 75'; Calligaris 80'	Report (FIFA); Report (UEFA)	Topçu 52'

Letzigrund, Zurich
Attendance: 12,000
Referee: Sofiya Prychyna (Ukraine)
14 April 2026
20:00

Northern Ireland	4–0	Malta
Halliday 5', 52'; Andrews 17'; Maxwell 60'	Report (FIFA); Report (UEFA)

Mourneview Park, Lurgan
Attendance: 821
Referee: Katarzyna Lisiecka-Sęk (Poland)

18 April 2026
18:00 (19:00 UTC+3)

Turkey	1–1	Switzerland
Altunkulak 79'	Report (FIFA); Report (UEFA)	Crnogorčević 52'

Sinop Sehir Stadyumu, Sinop
Attendance: 5,981
Referee: Katalin Kulcsár (Hungary)
18 April 2026
19:00

Malta	2–4	Northern Ireland
Farrugia 41'; Ayres 80'	Report (FIFA); Report (UEFA)	Mason 40', 51'; Johnson 69'; McFarland 72'

Centenary Stadium, Ta' Qali
Attendance: 790
Referee: Lina Lehtovaara (Finland)

5 June 2026
19:00 (20:00 UTC+3)

Turkey	2–1	Northern Ireland
Pekel 26'; Şeker 48'	Report (FIFA); Report (UEFA)	Bell 45' (pen.)

Pendik Stadium, Istanbul
Attendance: 1,117
Referee: Alexandra Collin (France)
5 June 2026
19:30

Switzerland	6–1	Malta
Schertenleib 8'; Piubel 23'; Xhemaili 38', 81'; Csillag 40'; Reuteler 70'	Report (FIFA); Report (UEFA)	Willis 21'

AIL Arena, Lugano
Attendance: 7,526
Referee: Kristina Georgieva (Bulgaria)

9 June 2026
19:00 (18:00 UTC+1)

Northern Ireland	1–2	Switzerland
Cassap 85'	Report (FIFA); Report (UEFA)	Reuteler 29'; Vallotto 41'

Mourneview Park, Lurgan
Attendance: 1,060
Referee: Anastasia Mylopoulou (Greece)
9 June 2026
19:00

Malta	0–3	Turkey
	Report (FIFA); Report (UEFA)	Gatt 8' (o.g.); Türkoğlu 38'; Altunkulak 52'

Centenary Stadium, Ta' Qali
Attendance: 994
Referee: Sabina Bolić (Croatia)

=== Group B3 ===
Pos	Team	Pld	W	D	L	GF	GA	GD	Pts	Promotion, qualification or relegation	(Portugal)	(Finland)	(Slovakia)	(Latvia)
1	Portugal (P)	6	5	0	1	17	4	+13	15	Advance to play-offs and promotion to League A	—	2–0	4–0	5–0
2	Finland	6	5	0	1	15	6	+9	15	Advance to play-offs	3–1	—	4–2	3–1
3	Slovakia (R)	6	2	0	4	8	17	−9	6	Advance to play-offs and relegation to League C	1–2	0–4	—	3–2
4	Latvia (R)	6	0	0	6	4	17	−13	0	Relegation to League C	0–3	0–1	1–2	—

Source: UEFA
Rules for classification: Tiebreakers
(P) Promoted; (R) Relegated
3 March 2026
16:00

Slovakia	3–2	Latvia
Hmírová 7'; Šurnovská 32'; Košíková 60'	Report (FIFA); Report (UEFA)	Poļuhoviča 56'; Ševcova 63'

NTC Poprad, Poprad
Attendance: 707
Referee: Vanja Janković (Slovenia)
3 March 2026
18:45 (17:45 UTC)

Portugal	2–0	Finland
Alves 90+1'; Santiago 90+4'	Report (FIFA); Report (UEFA)

Estádio do Futebol Clube de Vizela, Vizela
Attendance: 2,177
Referee: Franziska Wildfeuer (Germany)

7 March 2026
13:30 (14:30 UTC+2)

Finland	3–1	Latvia
Öling 26', 56'; Sevenius 65'	Report (FIFA); Report (UEFA)	Andersone 90+3'

Helsinki Football Stadium, Helsinki
Attendance: 2,471
Referee: Tatyana Sorokopudova (Kazakhstan)
7 March 2026
16:00 (15:00 UTC)

Portugal	4–0	Slovakia
Capeta 19', 44'; Santiago 48'; J. Silva 74'	Report (FIFA); Report (UEFA)

Estádio Cidade de Barcelos, Barcelos
Attendance: 5,156
Referee: Martina Molinaro (Italy)

14 April 2026
17:30 (18:30 UTC+3)

Finland	4–2	Slovakia
Kosola 4'; Engman 22'; P. Nyström 67'; E. Nyström 75'	Report (FIFA); Report (UEFA)	Fabová 35'; Hmírová 71' (pen.)

Helsinki Football Stadium, Helsinki
Attendance: 4,287
Referee: Kirsty Dowle (England)
14 April 2026
19:00 (20:00 UTC+3)

Latvia	0–3	Portugal
	Report (FIFA); Report (UEFA)	Nazareth 14', 73'; T. Pinto 18'

Daugava Stadium, Riga
Attendance: 533
Referee: Laura Mauricio (Switzerland)

18 April 2026
16:00

Slovakia	1–2	Portugal
Fabová 8'	Report (FIFA); Report (UEFA)	Santiago 37'; Nazareth 42'

Futbal Tatran Arena, Prešov
Attendance: 3,554
Referee: Maïka Vanderstichel (France)
18 April 2026
19:00 (20:00 UTC+3)

Latvia	0–1	Finland
	Report (FIFA); Report (UEFA)	Lindström 66'

Daugava Stadium, Riga
Attendance: 528
Referee: Lovisa Johansson (Sweden)

5 June 2026
16:00

Slovakia	0–4	Finland
	Report (FIFA); Report (UEFA)	Öling 20'; Lindström 53', 63'; Sevenius 61'

Štadión pod Zoborom, Nitra
Attendance: 543
Referee: Milica Milovanović (Serbia)
5 June 2026
21:00 (20:00 UTC+1)

Portugal	5–0	Latvia
Santiago 47'; Capeta 54'; Nazareth 61', 63'; Silva 84'	Report (FIFA); Report (UEFA)

Estádio António Coimbra da Mota, Estoril
Attendance: 2,531
Referee: Olivia Tschon (Austria)

9 June 2026
19:00 (20:00 UTC+3)

Finland	3–1	Portugal
Lehtola 12', 47'; E. Nyström 79'	Report (FIFA); Report (UEFA)	Nazareth 29'

Tammelan Stadion, Tampere
Attendance: 7,078
Referee: Merima Čelik (Bosnia and Herzegovina)
9 June 2026
19:00 (20:00 UTC+3)

Latvia	1–2	Slovakia
Miksone 45' (pen.)	Report (FIFA); Report (UEFA)	Lemešová 78'; Gondová 90+2'

Daugava Stadium, Riga
Attendance: 611
Referee: Nanna Løf Andersen (Denmark)

=== Group B4 ===
Pos	Team	Pld	W	D	L	GF	GA	GD	Pts	Promotion, qualification or relegation	(Scotland)	(Belgium)	(Israel)	(Luxembourg)
1	Scotland (P)	6	4	2	0	24	2	+22	14	Advance to play-offs and promotion to League A	—	1–1	6–0	7–0
2	Belgium	6	4	2	0	22	1	+21	14	Advance to play-offs	0–0	—	5–0	6–0
3	Israel (R)	6	2	0	4	10	20	−10	6	Advance to play-offs and relegation to League C	1–5	0–3	—	6–0
4	Luxembourg (R)	6	0	0	6	1	34	−33	0	Relegation to League C	0–5	0–7	1–3	—

Source: UEFA
Rules for classification: Tiebreakers
(P) Promoted; (R) Relegated
3 March 2026
19:30

Israel	0–3	Belgium
	Report (FIFA); Report (UEFA)	Wullaert 26'; Eurlings 42'; Janssen 89'

BSC Stadium, Budaörs (Hungary) (Note: Due to the Gaza war, Israel are required to play their home matches at neutral venues until further notice.)
Attendance: 0
Referee: Michaela Pachtová (Czech Republic)
3 March 2026
19:30

Luxembourg	0–5	Scotland
	Report (FIFA); Report (UEFA)	Weir 9', 37', 62'; Clark 27'; McGovern 88'

Stade Émile Mayrisch, Esch-sur-Alzette
Attendance: 688
Referee: Kristina Georgieva (Bulgaria)

7 March 2026
17:00

Belgium	5–0	Israel
Wullaert 10', 16', 66' (pen.); Mertens 19'; Missipo 90+3'	Report (FIFA); Report (UEFA)

BSC Stadium, Budaörs (Hungary)
Attendance: 0
Referee: Rasa Grigonė (Lithuania)
7 March 2026
17:00 (16:00 UTC)

Scotland	7–0	Luxembourg
McGovern 1', 32'; Clark 10', 55'; Davidson 78'; Lawton 89'; McAneny 90+4'	Report (FIFA); Report (UEFA)

Hampden Park, Glasgow
Attendance: 4,266
Referee: Nanna Løf Andersen (Denmark)

14 April 2026
19:15

Israel	6–0	Luxembourg
Kats 10', 44', 83'; Selimhodzic 13'; Ben Israel 18', 40'	Report (FIFA); Report (UEFA)

BSC Stadium, Budaörs (Hungary)
Attendance: 0
Referee: Maria Marotta (Italy)
14 April 2026
20:30 (19:30 UTC+1)

Scotland	1–1	Belgium
McGovern 90+5'	Report (FIFA); Report (UEFA)	Kees 15'

Easter Road, Edinburgh
Attendance: 4,522
Referee: Lotta Vuorio (Finland)

18 April 2026
18:00

Luxembourg	1–3	Israel
Dos Santos 7'	Report (FIFA); Report (UEFA)	Kats 10', 34'; Selimhodzic 37'

BSC Stadium, Budaörs (Hungary)
Attendance: 0
Referee: Jelena Medjedovic (Serbia)
18 April 2026
20:30

Belgium	0–0	Scotland
	Report (FIFA); Report (UEFA)

Den Dreef, Leuven
Attendance: 4,052
Referee: Réka Molnar (Hungary)

5 June 2026
18:00

Scotland	6–0	Israel
Cuthbert 17'; Weir 20', 57', 67' (pen.); Davidson 81'; Hanson 86'	Report (FIFA); Report (UEFA)

Bozsik Aréna, Budapest (Hungary)
Attendance: 0
Referee: Deborah Anex (Switzerland)
5 June 2026
20:15

Belgium	6–0	Luxembourg
Eurlings 11'; Wullaert 19', 46', 66'; Janssens 74', 76'	Report (FIFA); Report (UEFA)

Den Dreef, Leuven
Attendance: 4,137
Referee: Ana Maria Terteleac (Romania)

9 June 2026
19:00

Israel	1–5	Scotland
Kats 56'	Report (FIFA); Report (UEFA)	Weir 16', 71' (pen.), 79', 90'; Clark 37'

Bozsik Aréna, Budapest (Hungary)
Attendance: 0
Referee: Karoline Marie Jensen (Norway)
9 June 2026
19:00

Luxembourg	0–7	Belgium
	Report (FIFA); Report (UEFA)	Wullaert 20'; Tysiak 46', 67'; Detruyer 61'; Eurlings 82', 88'; Iliano 87'

Stade de la Frontière, Esch-sur-Alzette
Attendance: 1,053
Referee: Aleksandra Česen (Slovenia)

== Ranking of third-placed teams ==
Pos	Grp	Team	Pld	W	D	L	GF	GA	GD	Pts	Relegation
1	B1	Albania	6	2	1	3	9	14	−5	7	
2	B2	Northern Ireland	6	2	0	4	10	9	+1	6	
3	B3	Slovakia	6	2	0	4	8	17	−9	6	Relegation to League C
4	B4	Israel	6	2	0	4	10	20	−10	6	Relegation to League C

Source: UEFA
Rules for classification: Tiebreakers

== Overall standings ==
Pos	Grp	Team	Pld	W	D	L	GF	GA	GD	Pts
17	B2	Switzerland	6	5	1	0	18	5	+13	16
18	B3	Portugal	6	5	0	1	17	4	+13	15
19	B4	Scotland	6	4	2	0	24	2	+22	14
20	B1	Wales	6	4	2	0	17	5	+12	14
21	B3	Finland	6	5	0	1	15	6	+9	15
22	B4	Belgium	6	4	2	0	22	1	+21	14
23	B2	Turkey	6	4	1	1	11	5	+6	13
24	B1	Czech Republic	6	3	2	1	18	8	+10	11
25	B1	Albania	6	2	1	3	9	14	−5	7
26	B2	Northern Ireland	6	2	0	4	10	9	+1	6
27	B3	Slovakia	6	2	0	4	8	17	−9	6
28	B4	Israel	6	2	0	4	10	20	−10	6
29	B1	Montenegro	6	0	1	5	6	23	−17	1
30	B3	Latvia	6	0	0	6	4	17	−13	0
31	B2	Malta	6	0	0	6	4	24	−20	0
32	B4	Luxembourg	6	0	0	6	1	34	−33	0

Source: UEFA
Rules for classification: Tiebreakers

== Goalscorers ==
There were 194 goals scored in 48 matches, for an average of 4.04 goals per match.

10 goals

- (Scotland women's national football team) Caroline Weir

8 goals

- (Belgium women's national football team) Tessa Wullaert

6 goals

- (Israel women's national football team) Vital Kats
- (Portugal women's national football team) Kika Nazareth
- (Wales women's national football team) Hannah Cain

4 goals

- (Albania women's national football team) Megi Doçi
- (Belgium women's national football team) Hannah Eurlings
- (Czech Republic women's national football team) Klára Cahynová
- (Czech Republic women's national football team) Michaela Khýrová
- (Portugal women's national football team) Carolina Santiago
- (Scotland women's national football team) Jenna Clark
- (Scotland women's national football team) Kathleen McGovern

3 goals

- (Finland women's national football team) Lotta Lindström
- (Finland women's national football team) Ria Öling
- (Portugal women's national football team) Ana Capeta
- (Switzerland women's national football team) Aurélie Csillag
- (Switzerland women's national football team) Riola Xhemaili
- (Wales women's national football team) Mared Griffiths

2 goals

- (Albania women's national football team) Fortesa Berisha
- (Belgium women's national football team) Jill Janssens
- (Belgium women's national football team) Amber Tysiak
- (Czech Republic women's national football team) Franny Černá
- (Czech Republic women's national football team) Klára Cvrčková
- (Finland women's national football team) Nea Lehtola
- (Finland women's national football team) Paulina Nyström
- (Finland women's national football team) Oona Sevenius
- (Israel women's national football team) Maayan Ben Israel
- (Israel women's national football team) Noa Selimhodzic
- (Malta women's national football team) Maria Farrugia
- (Montenegro women's national football team) Jasna Đoković
- (Montenegro women's national football team) Armisa Kuč
- (Northern Ireland women's national football team) Keri Halliday
- (Northern Ireland women's national football team) Ellie Mason
- (Scotland women's national football team) Lauren Davidson
- (Slovakia women's national football team) Klaudia Fabová
- (Slovakia women's national football team) Patrícia Hmírová
- (Switzerland women's national football team) Svenja Fölmli
- (Switzerland women's national football team) Géraldine Reuteler
- (Switzerland women's national football team) Sydney Schertenleib
- (Turkey women's national football team) Selen Altunkulak
- (Turkey women's national football team) Ebru Topçu
- (Turkey women's national football team) Ece Türkoğlu
- (Wales women's national football team) Elise Hughes
- (Wales women's national football team) Rhiannon Roberts

1 goal

- (Albania women's national football team) Arbiona Bajraktari
- (Albania women's national football team) Gresa Berisha
- (Albania women's national football team) Vanesa Levenaj
- (Belgium women's national football team) Marie Detruyer
- (Belgium women's national football team) Isabelle Iliano
- (Belgium women's national football team) Saar Janssen
- (Belgium women's national football team) Sari Kees
- (Belgium women's national football team) Zenia Mertens
- (Belgium women's national football team) Kassandra Missipo
- (Czech Republic women's national football team) Eva Bartoňová
- (Czech Republic women's national football team) Kamila Dubcová
- (Czech Republic women's national football team) Aneta Polášková
- (Czech Republic women's national football team) Andrea Švíbková
- (Czech Republic women's national football team) Jana Žufánková
- (Finland women's national football team) Adelina Engman
- (Finland women's national football team) Katariina Kosola
- (Finland women's national football team) Eva Nyström
- (Latvia women's national football team) Annija Andersone
- (Latvia women's national football team) Karlīna Miksone
- (Latvia women's national football team) Anastasija Poļuhoviča
- (Latvia women's national football team) Olga Ševcova
- (Luxembourg women's national football team) Kimberley Dos Santos
- (Malta women's national football team) Leah Ayres
- (Malta women's national football team) Kailey Willis
- (Montenegro women's national football team) Slađana Bulatović
- (Montenegro women's national football team) Medina Dešić
- (Northern Ireland women's national football team) Joely Andrews
- (Northern Ireland women's national football team) Megan Bell
- (Northern Ireland women's national football team) Emily Cassap
- (Northern Ireland women's national football team) Natalie Johnson
- (Northern Ireland women's national football team) Danielle Maxwell
- (Northern Ireland women's national football team) Leyla McFarland
- (Portugal women's national football team) Lúcia Alves
- (Portugal women's national football team) Tatiana Pinto
- (Portugal women's national football team) Dolores Silva
- (Portugal women's national football team) Jéssica Silva
- (Scotland women's national football team) Erin Cuthbert
- (Scotland women's national football team) Kirsty Hanson
- (Scotland women's national football team) Emma Lawton
- (Scotland women's national football team) Maria McAneny
- (Slovakia women's national football team) Dominika Gondová
- (Slovakia women's national football team) Kristína Košíková
- (Slovakia women's national football team) Diana Lemešová
- (Slovakia women's national football team) Martina Šurnovská
- (Switzerland women's national football team) Iman Beney
- (Switzerland women's national football team) Viola Calligaris
- (Switzerland women's national football team) Ana-Maria Crnogorčević
- (Switzerland women's national football team) Alisha Lehmann
- (Switzerland women's national football team) Seraina Piubel
- (Switzerland women's national football team) Smilla Vallotto
- (Turkey women's national football team) Arzu Karabulut
- (Turkey women's national football team) Melike Pekel
- (Turkey women's national football team) Busem Şeker
- (Wales women's national football team) Gemma Evans
- (Wales women's national football team) Sophie Ingle
- (Wales women's national football team) Rachel Rowe
- (Wales women's national football team) Lily Woodham

1 own goal

- (Malta women's national football team) Lexine Farrugia (against Turkey)
- (Malta women's national football team) Alexandra Gatt (against Turkey)
- (Montenegro women's national football team) Ajša Kalač (against Czech Republic)
