= Pendik Stadium =

Association football stadium in Istanbul, Turkey

- Pendik Stadyumu
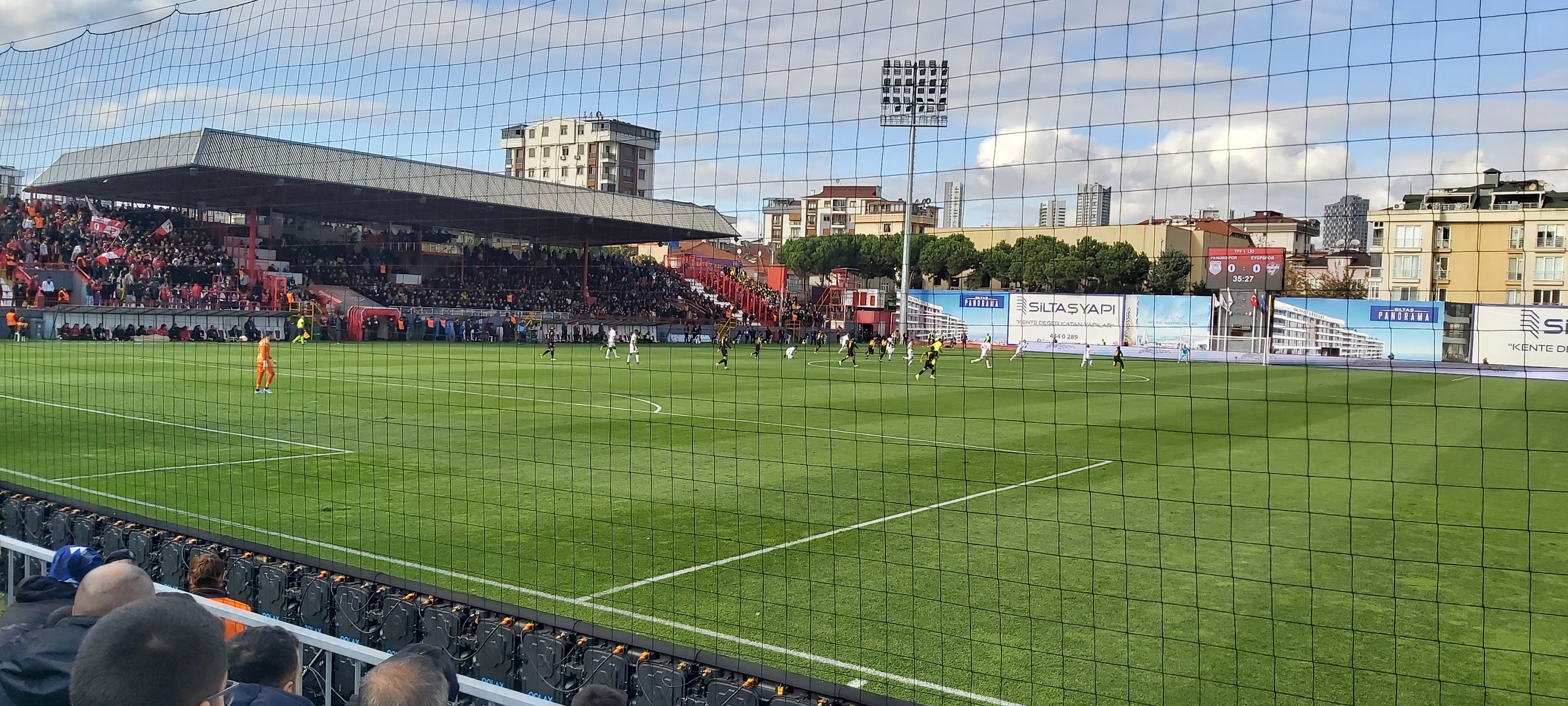
- Interactive map of Pendik Stadium
- Full name: Siltaş Yapı Pendik Stadyumu
- Location: Pendik, Istanbul, Turkey
- Coordinates: 40.88806°N 29.22778°E
- Owner: District Municipality of Pendik
- Operator: Youth and Sports Directorate of Istanbul Province
- Capacity: 4.105
- Type: Stadium
- Event: Football
- Surface: Grass
- Field size: 68 m × 105 m (223 ft × 344 ft)

Construction
- Opened: 1993; 33 years ago
- Renovated: 2022

Pendik Stadium (Turkish: Pendik Stadyumu), also known as Siltaş Yapı Pendik Stadiım for sponsorship reasons, is a stadium in Pendik district of Istanbul, Turkey. It was opened in 1993, and was renovated in 2022.

== Overview ==
Pendik Stadium was opened in 1993. It is owned by the district municipality, and operated by the Youth and Sports Directorate of Istanbul Province. The venue has a seating capacity of 4.105. The field has the dimensions of 68 m × 105 m (223 ft × 344 ft) with natural grass surface. It features lighting.

The stadium is home to the local football club Pendikspor. The stadium was renovated in 2022 under the sponsorship of the construction company Siltaş Yapı, following the promotion of Pendikspor to the second-level TFF 1. Lig, and it was renamed to Siltaş Yapı Pendik Stadium.

== International competitions hosted ==
The venue hosted the exhibition match of the Turkey national under-21 football team against Slovenia on 17 November 2023. The game ended with a 1–1 draw.

On 3 March 2026, Turkey women's national football team played a 2027 FIFA Women's World Cup qualification – UEFA League B match against Malta, which won 3–0.

Turkey women's national football team will be playing their fifth matchday at the 2027 FIFA Women's World Cup qualification – UEFA League B against Northern Ireland on 5 June 2026.
