= 2026–27 in German football =

Football in Germany
- Season: 2026–27

Men's football
- Franz Beckenbauer Supercup: Bayern Munich

The 2026–27 season is the 117th season of competitive football in Germany.

== Promotion and relegation ==
=== Pre-season ===
League	Promoted to league	Relegated from league
Bundesliga	Schalke 04; SV Elversberg; SC Paderborn	VfL Wolfsburg; 1. FC Heidenheim; FC St. Pauli
2. Bundesliga	VfL Osnabrück; Energie Cottbus	Fortuna Düsseldorf; Preußen Münster
3. Liga	Sonnenhof Großaspach; SV Meppen; Fortuna Köln; Würzburger Kickers	1860 Munich^{1}; Erzgebirge Aue; SSV Ulm; 1. FC Schweinfurt
Frauen-Bundesliga	VfB Stuttgart; Mainz 05	SGS Essen; Carl Zeiss Jena
2. Frauen-Bundesliga	TSG Hoffenheim II; 1. FC Köln II; Hertha BSC	VfR Warbeyen; VfL Wolfsburg II; Bayern Munich II

1860 Munich were administratively relegated to the Regionalliga Bayern after failing to obtain a 3. Liga license, sparing TSV Havelse from relegation.

== National teams ==
Win Draw Loss

=== Germany national football team ===
==== Kits ====
Home	Away

==== 2026–27 UEFA Nations League ====
===== Group 2 =====
Pos	Team	Pld	W	D	L	GF	GA	GD	Pts	Qualification or relegation	(Germany)	(Netherlands)	(Greece)	(Serbia)
1	Germany	6	3	2	1	11	3	+8	11 (Note: Tied on head-to-head points (5). Head-to-head goal difference: Germany +4, Netherlands +2, Greece −6.)	Advance to quarter-finals	—	5–0	0–1	2–0
2	Netherlands	6	3	2	1	14	10	+4	11	Advance to quarter-finals	1–1	—	7–0	2–1
3	Greece	6	3	2	1	6	10	−4	11		0–0	2–2	—	1–0
4	Serbia	6	0	0	6	4	12	−8	0	Qualification for relegation play-offs	1–3	1–2	1–2	—

Source: UEFA
Rules for classification: Tiebreakers
Notes:

24 September 2026 UEFA Nations League A	Netherlands	1–1	Germany	Amsterdam
20:45 (20:45 UTC+2)	Gakpo 90+2'	Report	Nmecha 32'	Stadium: Johan Cruyff Arena; Attendance: 51,437; Referee: Alejandro Hernández Hernández (Spain)

27 September 2026 UEFA Nations League A	Germany	0–1	Greece	Augsburg
20:45 (20:45 UTC+2)		Report	Kourbelis 74'	Stadium: Augsburg Arena; Attendance: 28,945; Referee: Chris Kavanagh (England)

1 October 2026 UEFA Nations League A	Germany	2–0	Serbia	Munich
20:45 (20:45 UTC+2)	Bischof 39'; Wirtz 61'	Report		Stadium: Allianz Arena; Attendance: 68,121; Referee: Espen Eskås (Norway)

4 October 2026 UEFA Nations League A	Greece	0–0	Germany	Thessaloniki
20:45 (21:45 UTC+3)		Report		Stadium: Toumba Stadium; Attendance: 27,599; Referee: Clément Turpin (France)

13 November 2026 UEFA Nations League A	Serbia	1–3	Germany	Belgrade
20:45 (20:45 UTC+1)	Babić 56'	Report	Babić 3' (o.g.); Wirtz 14'; Gruda 50'	Stadium: Rajko Mitić Stadium; Attendance: 2,962; Referee: Javier Alberola Rojas (Spain)

16 November 2026 UEFA Nations League A	Germany	5–0	Netherlands	Berlin
20:45 (20:45 UTC+1)	Scherhant 41'; Wirtz 60', 71'; Schlotterbeck 65'; Gruda 77'	Report		Stadium: Olympiastadion; Attendance: 74,667; Referee: Glenn Nyberg (Sweden)

===== Quarter-finals =====
25 March 2027 First leg	Belgium	v	Germany
20:45 (20:45 UTC+1)		Report

28 March 2027 Second leg	Germany	v	Belgium
20:45 (20:45 UTC+2)		Report

=== Germany women's national football team ===
==== Kits ====
Home	Away

==== 2027 UEFA Nations League ====
===== Group A4 =====
Pos	Team	Pld	W	D	L	GF	GA	GD	Pts	Promotion, qualification or relegation	(Spain)	(Norway)	(Republic of Ireland)	(Switzerland)
1	Spain	0	0	0	0	0	0	0	0	Qualification to 2028 Summer Olympics and Nations League Finals	—	2 Mar	20 Apr	15 Jun
2	Norway	0	0	0	0	0	0	0	0		24 Apr	—	15 Jun	20 Apr
3	Republic of Ireland	0	0	0	0	0	0	0	0	Qualification for relegation play-offs	11 Jun	2 Mar	—	6 Mar
4	Switzerland	0	0	0	0	0	0	0	0	Relegation to League B	6 Mar	11 Jun	24 Apr	—

First match(es) will be played: 2 March 2027. Source: UEFA
Rules for classification: Tiebreakers

Pos	Team	Pld	W	D	L	GF	GA	GD	Pts	Promotion, qualification or relegation	(France)	(England)	(Austria)	(Portugal)
1	France	0	0	0	0	0	0	0	0	Qualification to 2028 Summer Olympics and Nations League Finals	—	11 Jun	2 Mar	23 Apr
2	England	0	0	0	0	0	0	0	0		6 Mar	—	18 Apr	15 Jun
3	Austria	0	0	0	0	0	0	0	0	Qualification for relegation play-offs	15 Jun	23 Apr	—	6 Mar
4	Portugal	0	0	0	0	0	0	0	0	Relegation to League B	19 Apr	2 Mar	11 Jun	—

First match(es) will be played: 2 March 2027. Source: UEFA
Rules for classification: Tiebreakers

Pos	Team	Pld	W	D	L	GF	GA	GD	Pts	Promotion, qualification or relegation	(Denmark)	(Italy)	(Iceland)	(Wales)
1	Denmark	0	0	0	0	0	0	0	0	Qualification to 2028 Summer Olympics and Nations League Finals	—	2 Mar	11 Jun	24 Apr
2	Italy	0	0	0	0	0	0	0	0		15 Jun	—	6 Mar	20 Apr
3	Iceland	0	0	0	0	0	0	0	0	Qualification for relegation play-offs	20 Apr	24 Apr	—	15 Jun
4	Wales	0	0	0	0	0	0	0	0	Relegation to League B	6 Mar	11 Jun	2 Mar	—

First match(es) will be played: 2 March 2027. Source: UEFA
Rules for classification: Tiebreakers

Pos	Team	Pld	W	D	L	GF	GA	GD	Pts	Promotion, qualification or relegation	(Germany)	(Netherlands)	(Sweden)	(Scotland)
1	Germany	0	0	0	0	0	0	0	0	Qualification to 2028 Summer Olympics and Nations League Finals	—	20 Apr	15 Jun	6 Mar
2	Netherlands	0	0	0	0	0	0	0	0		24 Apr	—	6 Mar	15 Jun
3	Sweden	0	0	0	0	0	0	0	0	Qualification for relegation play-offs	2 Mar	11 Jun	—	20 Apr
4	Scotland	0	0	0	0	0	0	0	0	Relegation to League B	11 Jun	2 Mar	24 Apr	—

First match(es) will be played: 2 March 2027. Source: UEFA
Rules for classification: Tiebreakers

2 March 2027 Nations League GS	Sweden	v	Germany
		Report

6 March 2027 Nations League GS	Germany	v	Scotland
		Report

20 April 2027 Nations League GS	Germany	v	Netherlands
		Report

24 April 2027 Nations League GS	Netherlands	v	Germany
		Report

11 June 2027 Nations League GS	Scotland	v	Germany
		Report

15 June 2027 Nations League GS	Germany	v	Sweden
		Report

==== Friendly matches ====
9 October 2026 Friendly	Germany	4–2	Australia	Karlsruhe
20:30 (20:30 UTC+2)	Kössler 23', 30'; Küver 83'; Nüsken 90+4'	Report	Kerr 45+2'; McNamara 90+3'	Stadium: Wildparkstadion; Attendance: 26,352; Referee: Olivia Tschon (Austria)

13 October 2026 Friendly	Germany	2–1	Japan	Bremen
17:45 (17:45 UTC+2)	Dallmann 28'; Bühl 73'	Report	Tanikawa 15'	Stadium: Weserstadion; Attendance: 26,574; Referee: Karoline Marie Jensen (Norway)

30 November 2026 Friendly	Argentina	v	Germany	La Plata
00:15 (20:15 UTC−3)		Report		Stadium: Estadio Único Diego Armando Maradona

4 December 2026 Friendly	Germany	v	Peru	Rio de Janeiro, Brazil
22:15 (18:15 UTC−3)		Report

== League season ==
=== Men ===
==== Bundesliga ====
===== Bundesliga standings =====
Pos	Team	Pld	W	D	L	GF	GA	GD	Pts	Qualification or relegation
1	Bayern Munich	9	6	3	0	29	9	+20	21	Qualification for the Champions League league phase
2	Borussia Dortmund	9	6	3	0	16	7	+9	21	Qualification for the Champions League league phase
3	SC Freiburg	9	6	1	2	20	10	+10	19	Qualification for the Champions League league phase
4	RB Leipzig	9	6	0	3	27	13	+14	18	Qualification for the Champions League league phase
5	Bayer Leverkusen	9	5	1	3	20	17	+3	16	Qualification for the Europa League league phase (Note: The 2026–27 DFB-Pokal winners also qualify for the Europa League league stage (or the sixth-placed team if the DFB-Pokal winners finish in the top five of the Bundesliga). If the DFB-Pokal winners finish in the top six of the Bundesliga, the Conference League spot will be passed to the seventh-placed team.)
6	Werder Bremen	9	4	3	2	17	15	+2	15	Qualification for the Conference League play-off round
7	SV Elversberg	9	4	1	4	17	18	−1	13	
8	VfB Stuttgart	9	4	0	5	15	15	0	12	
9	TSG Hoffenheim	9	4	0	5	16	17	−1	12	
10	Eintracht Frankfurt	9	3	3	3	15	20	−5	12	
11	Hamburger SV	9	4	0	5	10	20	−10	12	
12	Mainz 05	9	3	1	5	18	19	−1	10	
13	SC Paderborn	9	2	4	3	8	11	−3	10	
14	FC Augsburg	9	2	3	4	20	20	0	9	
15	1. FC Köln	9	2	3	4	10	14	−4	9	
16	Union Berlin	9	1	4	4	7	21	−14	7	Qualification for the relegation play-offs
17	Schalke 04	9	1	3	5	5	11	−6	6	Relegation to 2. Bundesliga
18	Borussia Mönchengladbach	9	1	1	7	12	25	−13	4	Relegation to 2. Bundesliga

Updated to match(es) played on 8 November 2026. Source: Bundesliga
Rules for classification: 1) Points; 2) Goal difference; 3) Goals scored; 4) Head-to-head aggregate results; 5) Head-to-head away goals scored; 6) Away goals scored; 7) Play-off at neutral site.
(Rules 4–6 only apply after all home-and-away matches have been played between the tied teams. Rule 7 only applies after the completion of the season.)

==== 2. Bundesliga ====
===== 2. Bundesliga standings =====
Pos	Team	Pld	W	D	L	GF	GA	GD	Pts	Promotion, qualification or relegation
1	Hertha BSC	11	10	1	0	25	9	+16	31	Promotion to Bundesliga
2	1. FC Nürnberg	11	7	3	1	26	13	+13	24	Promotion to Bundesliga
3	1. FC Kaiserslautern	11	6	3	2	10	7	+3	21	Qualification for promotion play-offs
4	1. FC Magdeburg	11	6	2	3	25	14	+11	20	
5	VfL Wolfsburg	11	5	4	2	26	16	+10	19	
6	Arminia Bielefeld	11	5	2	4	18	16	+2	17	
7	1. FC Heidenheim	11	4	4	3	19	20	−1	16	
8	VfL Bochum	11	4	2	5	11	13	−2	14	
9	FC St. Pauli	11	2	6	3	13	16	−3	12	
10	Greuther Fürth	11	3	3	5	13	19	−6	12	
11	Hannover 96	11	3	3	5	12	18	−6	12	
12	Energie Cottbus	11	2	5	4	18	20	−2	11	
13	Eintracht Braunschweig	11	3	2	6	16	18	−2	11	
14	VfL Osnabrück	11	3	2	6	14	18	−4	11	
15	Dynamo Dresden	11	3	2	6	15	20	−5	11	
16	Karlsruher SC	11	3	2	6	15	24	−9	11	Qualification for relegation play-offs
17	Darmstadt 98	11	2	3	6	9	21	−12	9	Relegation to 3. Liga
18	Holstein Kiel	11	1	5	5	11	14	−3	8	Relegation to 3. Liga

Updated to match(es) played on 8 November 2026. Source: Bundesliga
Rules for classification: 1) Points; 2) Goal difference; 3) Goals scored; 4) Head-to-head results; 5) Head-to-head away goals scored; 6) Away goals scored; 7) Play-off.
(Rules 4–6 only apply after home and away matches have been played between the tied teams.)

==== 3. Liga ====
===== 3. Liga standings =====
Pos	Team	Pld	W	D	L	GF	GA	GD	Pts	Promotion, qualification or relegation
1	Viktoria Köln	13	9	2	2	36	18	+18	29	Promotion to 2. Bundesliga and qualification for DFB-Pokal
2	MSV Duisburg	13	9	2	2	33	18	+15	29	Promotion to 2. Bundesliga and qualification for DFB-Pokal
3	Rot-Weiss Essen	13	8	3	2	21	13	+8	27	Qualification for promotion play-offs and DFB-Pokal
4	Wehen Wiesbaden	13	6	3	4	26	17	+9	21	Qualification for DFB-Pokal
5	FC Ingolstadt	13	6	3	4	19	19	0	21	
6	1. FC Saarbrücken	13	6	2	5	31	26	+5	20	
7	Alemannia Aachen	13	6	2	5	19	19	0	20	
8	Waldhof Mannheim	13	6	1	6	23	20	+3	19	
9	TSG Hoffenheim II (Note: Reserve teams are ineligible for promotion or DFB-Pokal qualification.)	13	6	1	6	22	20	+2	19	
10	Hansa Rostock	13	5	4	4	22	22	0	19	
11	SV Meppen	13	5	3	5	18	18	0	18	
12	VfB Stuttgart II	13	5	3	5	22	23	−1	18	
13	Fortuna Düsseldorf	13	4	4	5	14	17	−3	16	
14	Preußen Münster	13	4	3	6	21	25	−4	15	
15	Würzburger Kickers	13	4	2	7	17	25	−8	14	
16	Jahn Regensburg	13	3	4	6	23	23	0	13	
17	SC Verl	13	3	3	7	17	27	−10	12	Relegation to Regionalliga
18	Sonnenhof Großaspach	13	3	3	7	13	29	−16	12	Relegation to Regionalliga
19	Fortuna Köln	13	2	4	7	10	16	−6	10	Relegation to Regionalliga
20	TSV Havelse	13	2	4	7	17	29	−12	10	Relegation to Regionalliga

Updated to match(es) played on 8 November 2026. Source: DFB
Rules for classification: 1) Points; 2) Goal difference; 3) Goals scored; 4) Head-to-head results; 5) Head-to-head away goals scored; 6) Away goals scored; 7) Play-off.

=== Women ===
==== Frauen-Bundesliga ====
===== Frauen-Bundesliga standings =====
Pos	Team	Pld	W	D	L	GF	GA	GD	Pts	Qualification or relegation
1	Bayern Munich	10	10	0	0	36	9	+27	30	Qualification for the Champions League league phase
2	VfL Wolfsburg	10	8	0	2	30	13	+17	24	Qualification for the Champions League third qualifying round
3	Eintracht Frankfurt	10	6	2	2	21	11	+10	20	Qualification for the Champions League second qualifying round
4	Werder Bremen	10	6	1	3	20	14	+6	19	
5	Bayer Leverkusen	10	6	1	3	18	14	+4	19	
6	1. FC Köln	10	6	0	4	17	13	+4	18	
7	TSG Hoffenheim	10	4	1	5	13	16	−3	13	
8	Union Berlin	10	3	2	5	15	19	−4	11	
9	VfB Stuttgart	10	3	2	5	13	24	−11	11	
10	RB Leipzig	10	3	1	6	16	22	−6	10	
11	SC Freiburg	10	3	1	6	11	19	−8	10	
12	Hamburger SV	10	2	3	5	20	18	+2	9	
13	1. FC Nürnberg	10	2	2	6	16	24	−8	8	Relegation to 2. Bundesliga
14	Mainz 05	10	0	0	10	6	36	−30	0	Relegation to 2. Bundesliga

Updated to match(es) played on 16 November 2026. Source: DFB
Rules for classification: 1) Points; 2) Goal difference; 3) Goals scored; 4) Head-to-head results; 5) Head-to-head away goals scored; 6) Away goals scored; 7) Play-off.

==== 2. Frauen-Bundesliga ====
===== 2. Frauen-Bundesliga standings =====
Pos	Team	Pld	W	D	L	GF	GA	GD	Pts	Qualification or relegation
1	Viktoria Berlin	12	10	0	2	22	6	+16	30	Promotion to Bundesliga
2	SGS Essen	12	9	2	1	31	8	+23	29	Promotion to Bundesliga
3	VfL Bochum	12	7	3	2	29	14	+15	24	
4	Hertha BSC	12	7	2	3	19	18	+1	23	
5	Borussia Mönchengladbach	12	7	0	5	22	19	+3	21	
6	FC Ingolstadt	12	6	2	4	18	14	+4	20	
7	SV Meppen	12	4	4	4	18	14	+4	16	
8	SG Andernach	12	5	1	6	15	24	−9	16	
9	Carl Zeiss Jena	12	4	2	6	17	17	0	14	
10	Eintracht Frankfurt II (Note: Reserve teams cannot compete in the Frauen-Bundesliga and are therefore ineligible for promotion.)	12	4	1	7	7	21	−14	13	
11	SC Sand	12	3	3	6	12	17	−5	12	
12	TSG Hoffenheim II	12	2	2	8	18	26	−8	8	Relegation to 3. Liga
13	Turbine Potsdam	12	2	2	8	8	23	−15	8	Relegation to 3. Liga
14	1. FC Köln II	12	1	2	9	7	22	−15	5	Relegation to 3. Liga

Updated to match(es) played on 15 November 2026. Source: DFB
Rules for classification: 1) Points; 2) Goal difference; 3) Goals scored; 4) Head-to-head results; 5) Head-to-head away goals scored; 6) Away goals scored; 7) Play-off.

== Cup competitions ==
=== Men ===
==== Franz Beckenbauer Supercup ====
22 August 2026
20:30 CEST

Borussia Dortmund	1–2	Bayern Munich
Silva 75'	Report	Brown 28'; Olise 45+1'

Signal Iduna Park, Dortmund
Attendance: 81,365
Referee: Daniel Schlager (Bietigheim)

=== Women ===
==== DFB-Supercup Frauen ====
15 August 2026
19:30 CEST (UTC+2)

Bayern Munich	3–0	VfL Wolfsburg
Damnjanović 32'; Bühl 45+4', 46'	Report

Audi Sportpark, Ingolstadt
Attendance: 8,689
Referee: Angelika Söder

== German clubs in Europe ==
=== UEFA Champions League ===
==== League phase ====
===== Bayern Munich =====
Pos	Team	Pld	W	D	L	GF	GA	GD	Pts	Qualification
11	(Spain) Real Betis	4	3	0	1	8	6	+2	9	Advance to knockout phase play-offs (seeded)
12	(Germany) Borussia Dortmund	4	3	0	1	7	5	+2	9	Advance to knockout phase play-offs (seeded)
13	(Germany) Bayern Munich	4	2	2	0	12	5	+7	8	Advance to knockout phase play-offs (seeded)
14	(Germany) VfB Stuttgart	4	2	1	1	7	4	+3	7	Advance to knockout phase play-offs (seeded)
15	(Italy) Inter Milan	4	2	0	2	8	6	+2	6	Advance to knockout phase play-offs (seeded)

Updated to match(es) played on 4 November 2026. Source: UEFA
Rules for classification: League phase tiebreakers

Home team	Score	Away team
Bayern Munich (Germany)	5–0	(Norway) Bodø/Glimt
Viking (Norway)	3–3	(Germany) Bayern Munich
Bayern Munich (Germany)	2–2	(England) Arsenal
Atlético Madrid (Spain)	0–2	(Germany) Bayern Munich
Lille (France)	25 Nov	(Germany) Bayern Munich
Bayern Munich (Germany)	8 Dec	(Czech Republic) Slavia Prague
Manchester United (England)	20 Jan	(Germany) Bayern Munich
Bayern Munich (Germany)	27 Jan	(Spain) Real Betis

===== Borussia Dortmund =====
Pos	Team	Pld	W	D	L	GF	GA	GD	Pts	Qualification
10	(Portugal) Sporting CP	4	3	0	1	8	4	+4	9	Advance to knockout phase play-offs (seeded)
11	(Spain) Real Betis	4	3	0	1	8	6	+2	9	Advance to knockout phase play-offs (seeded)
12	(Germany) Borussia Dortmund	4	3	0	1	7	5	+2	9	Advance to knockout phase play-offs (seeded)
13	(Germany) Bayern Munich	4	2	2	0	12	5	+7	8	Advance to knockout phase play-offs (seeded)
14	(Germany) VfB Stuttgart	4	2	1	1	7	4	+3	7	Advance to knockout phase play-offs (seeded)

Updated to match(es) played on 4 November 2026. Source: UEFA
Rules for classification: League phase tiebreakers

Home team	Score	Away team
Borussia Dortmund (Germany)	3–2	(Spain) Villarreal
Bodø/Glimt (Norway)	1–0	(Germany) Borussia Dortmund
Sabah (Azerbaijan)	1–2	(Germany) Borussia Dortmund
Borussia Dortmund (Germany)	2–1	(Spain) Real Betis
Arsenal (England)	24 Nov	(Germany) Borussia Dortmund
Borussia Dortmund (Germany)	9 Dec	(Italy) Inter Milan
Aston Villa (England)	19 Jan	(Germany) Borussia Dortmund
Borussia Dortmund (Germany)	27 Jan	(Greece) AEK Athens

===== RB Leipzig =====
Pos	Team	Pld	W	D	L	GF	GA	GD	Pts
28	(Spain) Villarreal	4	1	0	3	8	14	−6	3
29	(Greece) AEK Athens	4	1	0	3	5	11	−6	3
29	(Germany) RB Leipzig	4	1	0	3	5	11	−6	3
31	(Azerbaijan) Sabah	4	1	0	3	4	10	−6	3
32	(Netherlands) Feyenoord	4	1	0	3	4	11	−7	3

Updated to match(es) played on 4 November 2026. Source: UEFA
Rules for classification: League phase tiebreakers

Home team	Score	Away team
Como (Italy)	4–1	(Germany) RB Leipzig
RB Leipzig (Germany)	1–0	(Netherlands) PSV Eindhoven
Real Madrid (Spain)	4–1	(Germany) RB Leipzig
RB Leipzig (Germany)	2–3	(England) Manchester City
RB Leipzig (Germany)	24 Nov	(France) Lens
Manchester United (England)	8 Dec	(Germany) RB Leipzig
RB Leipzig (Germany)	20 Jan	(Ukraine) Shakhtar Donetsk
Feyenoord (Netherlands)	27 Jan	(Germany) RB Leipzig

===== VfB Stuttgart =====
Pos	Team	Pld	W	D	L	GF	GA	GD	Pts	Qualification
12	(Germany) Borussia Dortmund	4	3	0	1	7	5	+2	9	Advance to knockout phase play-offs (seeded)
13	(Germany) Bayern Munich	4	2	2	0	12	5	+7	8	Advance to knockout phase play-offs (seeded)
14	(Germany) VfB Stuttgart	4	2	1	1	7	4	+3	7	Advance to knockout phase play-offs (seeded)
15	(Italy) Inter Milan	4	2	0	2	8	6	+2	6	Advance to knockout phase play-offs (seeded)
16	(Austria) LASK	4	2	0	2	10	9	+1	6	Advance to knockout phase play-offs (seeded)

Updated to match(es) played on 4 November 2026. Source: UEFA
Rules for classification: League phase tiebreakers

Home team	Score	Away team
VfB Stuttgart (Germany)	3–1	(Norway) Viking
Slovan Bratislava (Slovakia)	0–3	(Germany) VfB Stuttgart
VfB Stuttgart (Germany)	1–1	(Spain) Atlético Madrid
Galatasaray (Turkey)	2–0	(Germany) VfB Stuttgart
Inter Milan (Italy)	25 Nov	(Germany) VfB Stuttgart
VfB Stuttgart (Germany)	9 Dec	(France) Lille
VfB Stuttgart (Germany)	19 Jan	(Belgium) Club Brugge
PSV Eindhoven (Netherlands)	27 Jan	(Germany) VfB Stuttgart

=== UEFA Europa League ===
==== League phase ====
===== Bayer Leverkusen =====
Pos	Team	Pld	W	D	L	GF	GA	GD	Pts	Qualification
5	(Italy) Juventus	4	3	1	0	11	4	+7	10	Advance to round of 16 (seeded)
6	(Greece) Olympiacos	4	3	1	0	4	1	+3	10	Advance to round of 16 (seeded)
7	(Germany) Bayer Leverkusen	4	3	0	1	8	1	+7	9	Advance to round of 16 (seeded)
8	(Turkey) Beşiktaş	4	2	1	1	11	8	+3	7	Advance to round of 16 (seeded)
9	(Croatia) Dinamo Zagreb	4	2	1	1	5	4	+1	7	Advance to knockout phase play-offs (seeded)

Updated to match(es) played on 5 November 2026. Source: UEFA
Rules for classification: League phase tiebreakers

Home team	Score	Away team
Bayer Leverkusen (Germany)	2–0	(Slovenia) Celje
Lech Poznań (Poland)	0–4	(Germany) Bayer Leverkusen
OFI (Greece)	0–2	(Germany) Bayer Leverkusen
Bayer Leverkusen (Germany)	0–1	(France) Marseille
Dinamo Zagreb (Croatia)	26 Nov	(Germany) Bayer Leverkusen
Bayer Leverkusen (Germany)	10 Dec	(Turkey) Beşiktaş
Bayer Leverkusen (Germany)	21 Jan	(Austria) Red Bull Salzburg
Lyon (France)	28 Jan	(Germany) Bayer Leverkusen

===== TSG Hoffenheim =====
Pos	Team	Pld	W	D	L	GF	GA	GD	Pts	Qualification
21	(England) Crystal Palace	4	1	2	1	9	6	+3	5	Advance to knockout phase play-offs (unseeded)
22	(Czech Republic) Sparta Prague	4	1	1	2	6	6	0	4	Advance to knockout phase play-offs (unseeded)
23	(Germany) TSG Hoffenheim	4	1	1	2	6	6	0	4	Advance to knockout phase play-offs (unseeded)
24	(Austria) Sturm Graz	4	1	1	2	3	6	−3	4	Advance to knockout phase play-offs (unseeded)
25	(Slovenia) Celje	4	1	1	2	5	9	−4	4	

Updated to match(es) played on 5 November 2026. Source: UEFA
Rules for classification: League phase tiebreakers

Home team	Score	Away team
OFI (Greece)	2–0	(Germany) TSG Hoffenheim
TSG Hoffenheim (Germany)	2–3	(Turkey) Beşiktaş
TSG Hoffenheim (Germany)	3–0	(France) Lyon
Crystal Palace (England)	1–1	(Germany) TSG Hoffenheim
TSG Hoffenheim (Germany)	26 Nov	(Austria) Sturm Graz
Anderlecht (Belgium)	10 Dec	(Germany) TSG Hoffenheim
Olympiacos (Greece)	21 Jan	(Germany) TSG Hoffenheim
TSG Hoffenheim (Germany)	28 Jan	(Hungary) Ferencváros

=== UEFA Conference League ===
==== Qualifying phase and play-off round ====
===== Play-off round =====
Play-off round
Team 1	Agg.	Team 2	1st leg	2nd leg
Motherwell (Scotland)	2–7	(Germany) SC Freiburg	1–3	1–4

==== League phase ====
===== SC Freiburg =====
Pos	Team	Pld	W	D	L	GF	GA	GD	Pts	Qualification
12	(Turkey) Trabzonspor	3	2	0	1	6	3	+3	6	Advance to knockout phase play-offs (seeded)
13	(Croatia) Hajduk Split	3	2	0	1	3	2	+1	6	Advance to knockout phase play-offs (seeded)
14	(Germany) SC Freiburg	3	2	0	1	4	5	−1	6	Advance to knockout phase play-offs (seeded)
15	(Serbia) Red Star Belgrade	3	1	1	1	6	6	0	4	Advance to knockout phase play-offs (seeded)
16	(Italy) Atalanta	3	1	1	1	4	4	0	4	Advance to knockout phase play-offs (seeded)

Updated to match(es) played on 5 November 2026. Source: UEFA
Rules for classification: League phase tiebreakers

Home team	Score	Away team
SC Freiburg (Germany)	3–2	(Czech Republic) Jablonec
Monaco (France)	3–0	(Germany) SC Freiburg
Trabzonspor (Turkey)	0–1	(Germany) SC Freiburg
SC Freiburg (Germany)	26 Nov	(Netherlands) Twente
SC Freiburg (Germany)	10 Dec	(Greece) Panathinaikos
Kauno Žalgiris (Lithuania)	17 Dec	(Germany) SC Freiburg

=== UEFA Women's Champions League ===
==== Qualifying rounds ====
===== Second qualifying round =====
====== Semi-finals ======
Second qualifying round semi-finals
Team 1	Score	Team 2
Eintracht Frankfurt (Germany)	8–0	(Cyprus) Omonia

====== Final ======
Second qualifying round final
Team 1	Score	Team 2
Eintracht Frankfurt (Germany)	2–0	(Sweden) Malmö FF

===== Third qualifying round =====
Third qualifying round
Team 1	Agg.	Team 2	1st leg	2nd leg
Eintracht Frankfurt (Germany)	2–6	(France) Paris Saint-Germain	1–1	1–5 (a.e.t.)
VfL Wolfsburg (Germany)	3–3 (4–5 p)	(Italy) Inter Milan	2–0	1–3 (a.e.t.)

==== League phase ====
===== Bayern Munich =====
Pos	Team	Pld	W	D	L	GF	GA	GD	Pts	Qualification
1	(Royal Spanish Football Federation) Barcelona (Q)	5	4	1	0	26	3	+23	13	Advance to the quarter-finals (seeded)
2	(French Football Federation) OL Lyonnes (Q)	5	4	1	0	22	0	+22	13	Advance to the quarter-finals (seeded)
3	(German Football Association) Bayern Munich (T)	5	3	2	0	13	5	+8	11	Advance to the quarter-finals (seeded)
4	(The Football Association) Chelsea (T)	5	3	2	0	4	0	+4	11	Advance to the quarter-finals (seeded)
5	(The Football Association) Manchester City (T)	5	2	3	0	10	5	+5	9 (Note: Ranked based on away goals scored, Manchester City 8, Real Madrid 3)	Advance to the knockout phase play-offs (seeded)

Updated to match(es) played on 19 November 2026. Source: UEFA
Rules for classification: League phase tiebreakers
(Q) Qualified for the phase indicated; (T) Qualified, but not yet for the particular phase indicated
Notes:

Home team	Score	Away team
Bayern Munich (Germany)	2–2	(England) Manchester City
Benfica (Portugal)	0–3	(Germany) Bayern Munich
Bayern Munich (Germany)	2–2	(Spain) Real Madrid
Paris Saint-Germain (France)	1–2	(Germany) Bayern Munich
Austria Wien	0–4	(Germany) Bayern Munich
Bayern Munich (Germany)	16 Dec	(Spain) Barcelona

=== UEFA Women's Europa Cup ===
==== Qualifying rounds ====
===== Second qualifying round =====
Second qualifying round
Team 1	Agg.	Team 2	1st leg	2nd leg
VfL Wolfsburg (Germany)	8–1	(Austria) Sturm Graz	6–1	2–0
FH (Iceland)	1–5	(Germany) Eintracht Frankfurt	0–1	1–4

==== Knockout stage ====
===== Round of 16 =====
Round of 16
Team 1	Agg.	Team 2	1st leg	2nd leg
PSV Eindhoven (Netherlands)	1–4	(Germany) Eintracht Frankfurt	0–2	1–2
VfL Wolfsburg (Germany)	10–0	(Netherlands) Feyenoord	7–0	3–0

===== Quarter-finals =====
Round of 16
Team 1	Agg.	Team 2	1st leg	2nd leg
Eintracht Frankfurt (Germany)		(Spain) Real Sociedad	3–4 Feb	10–11 Feb
Brøndby (Denmark)		(Germany) VfL Wolfsburg	3–4 Feb	10–11 Feb
