= Football at the 2028 Summer Olympics – Women's qualification =

Sixteen teams are scheduled to compete in the women's football tournament at the 2028 Summer Olympics. Fifteen women's national teams from six confederations will qualify to join the United States, who qualified as the host nation.

== Table ==
In April 2025, the IOC Executive Board approved FIFA's suggestion that the women's tournament be expanded to 16 teams. In December 2025, the FIFA Council approved the final allocation of berths, although CONMEBOL had already completed qualification.

Means of qualification	Dates (Note: Dates and venues are those of final tournaments (or final round of qualification tournaments); various qualification stages may precede these matches.)	Venue(s)	Berth(s)	Qualified
Host nation	—N/a	—N/a	1	United States
2028 AFC Women's Olympic Qualifying Tournament	19 April 2027 – 4 March 2028	Multiple	2	
2028 CAF Women's Olympic qualifying tournament	4 June 2026 – 4 December 2027	Multiple	2	
2026 CONCACAF W Championship	27 November – 5 December 2026	United States	3	
2025 Copa América Femenina	11 July – 2 August 2025	Ecuador	2	Brazil; Colombia
2028 OFC Olympic Qualifying Tournament	TBD	TBD	1	
2027 UEFA Women's Nations League	25 February – 15 June 2027	Multiple	4	
AFC–CONMEBOL play-off	2028	TBD	1	
Total			16	

== Confederation qualification ==
=== AFC ===
The 2026 AFC Women's Asian Cup quarter-finalists will be drawn into two groups of four teams with each group playing a league format. The two group winners will qualify for the Olympics, and two teams will play home-and-away to determine who will advance to the AFC–CONMEBOL play-off.

=== CAF ===
Thirty-five nations will compete in five rounds of two-legged ties to determine the two CAF qualifiers:

- First round – The six lowest-ranked teams competed June 2026 to determine who would face the three highest-ranked teams in the second round.
- Second round – Thirty-two teams competed October 2026 to advance to the third round.
- Third round – Sixteen teams will compete February–March 2027 to advance to the fourth round.
- Fourth round – Eight teams will compete October 2027 to advance to the fifth round.
- Fifth round – Four teams will compete November–December 2027 to qualify for the Olympics.

==== Most recent stage (Second round) ====
Team 1	Agg.	Team 2	1st leg	2nd leg
Tunisia	0–3	Senegal	0–1	0–2
Benin	5–7	Mali	3–1	2–6
Congo	w/o	Morocco	—	—
Comoros	0–7	Nigeria	0–2	0–5
Guinea	w/o	Cameroon	—	—
DR Congo	1–7	Ivory Coast	1–4	0–3
Central African Republic	0–15	Algeria	0–8	0–7
Burkina Faso	4–2	Equatorial Guinea	3–1	1–1
Rwanda	1–2	Ethiopia	0–1	1–1
Botswana	0–7	Tanzania	0–1	0–6
Angola	2–0	Namibia	0–0	2–0
Madagascar	0–7	South Africa	0–4	0–3
Seychelles	0–22	Kenya	0–11	0–11
Malawi	9–0	Zimbabwe	2–0	7–0
Uganda	3–5	Zambia	2–1	1–4
Mauritius	0–10	Ghana	0–3	0–7

==== Next stage (Third round) ====
Team 1	Agg.	Team 2	1st leg	2nd leg
Senegal	Matches 39/40	Mali	23 Feb – 6 Mar	23 Feb – 6 Mar
Morocco	Matches 41/42	Nigeria	23 Feb – 6 Mar	23 Feb – 6 Mar
Cameroon	Matches 43/44	Ivory Coast	23 Feb – 6 Mar	23 Feb – 6 Mar
Algeria	Matches 45/46	Burkina Faso	23 Feb – 6 Mar	23 Feb – 6 Mar
Ethiopia	Matches 47/48	Tanzania	23 Feb – 6 Mar	23 Feb – 6 Mar
Angola	Matches 49/50	South Africa	23 Feb – 6 Mar	23 Feb – 6 Mar
Kenya	Matches 51/52	Malawi	23 Feb – 6 Mar	23 Feb – 6 Mar
Zambia	Matches 53/54	Ghana	23 Feb – 6 Mar	23 Feb – 6 Mar

=== CONCACAF ===
In addition to the United States, who qualified automatically as hosts, the top three teams of the 2026 CONCACAF W Championship will qualify for the Olympics.

==== Most recent stage (qualification) ====
Group A
Pos	Team	Pld	Pts
1	Mexico	4	12
2	Puerto Rico	4	9
3	Saint Vincent and the Grenadines	4	6
4	U.S. Virgin Islands	4	3
5	Saint Lucia	4	0

Source: CONCACAF

Group D
Pos	Team	Pld	Pts
1	Haiti	4	10
2	Dominican Republic	4	8
3	Belize	4	6
4	Suriname	4	4
5	Anguilla	4	0

Source: CONCACAF

Group B
Pos	Team	Pld	Pts
1	Jamaica	4	12
2	Nicaragua	4	9
3	Guyana	4	6
4	Antigua and Barbuda	4	1
5	Dominica	4	1

Source: CONCACAF

Group E
Pos	Team	Pld	Pts
1	Panama	4	12
2	Cuba	4	7
3	Aruba	4	6
4	Curaçao	4	3
5	Saint Kitts and Nevis	4	1

Source: CONCACAF

Group C
Pos	Team	Pld	Pts
1	Costa Rica	4	12
2	Guatemala	4	9
3	Bermuda	4	6
4	Grenada	4	3
5	Cayman Islands	4	0

Source: CONCACAF

Group F
Pos	Team	Pld	Pts
1	El Salvador	3	9
2	Trinidad and Tobago	3	4
3	Honduras	3	4
4	Barbados	3	0

Source: CONCACAF

==== Next stage (CONCACAF W Championship) ====
Quarter-finals
27 November 2026 – Mansfield
United States
El Salvador
27 November 2026 – Mansfield
Jamaica
Costa Rica
28 November 2026 – Mansfield
Canada
Panama
28 November 2026 – Mansfield
Mexico
Haiti

Semi-finals
1 December 2026 – Mansfield
1 December 2026 – Mansfield

Final
5 December 2026 – Houston
Third place
5 December 2026 – Houston

=== CONMEBOL ===
The finalists of the 2025 Copa América Femenina, Brazil and Colombia, qualified for the Olympics before FIFA had announced slot allocation. In December 2025, FIFA announced that one team each from AFC and CONMEBOL would compete in a playoff for the last slot.

==== Group stage ====
Group A

Pos	Team	Pld	Pts
1	Argentina	4	12
2	Uruguay	4	7
3	Chile	4	6
4	Ecuador (H)	4	4
5	Peru	4	0

Source: CONMEBOL
(H) Hosts
Group B

Pos	Team	Pld	Pts
1	Brazil	4	10
2	Colombia	4	8
3	Paraguay	4	6
4	Venezuela	4	4
5	Bolivia	4	0

Source: CONMEBOL

==== Knockout stage ====
Semi-finals
28 July – Quito (RPD)
Argentina	0 (4)
Colombia (p)	0 (5)
29 July – Quito (RPD)
Brazil	5
Uruguay	1

Final
2 August – Quito (RPD)
Colombia	4 (4)
Brazil (p)	4 (5)

Fifth place match
28 July – Quito (IDV)
Chile	0
Paraguay	1

Third place match
1 August – Quito (RPD)
Argentina (p)	2 (5)
Uruguay	2 (4)

=== OFC ===
As in previous Olympic tournaments, OFC was allocated one slot. The qualification format has not been announced as of May 2026.

=== UEFA ===
On 17 December 2025, UEFA was allocated four slots for the 2028 Olympics. On 15 September 2026, UEFA confirmed the four highest-ranked Olympics-eligible League A teams following the league stage would qualify.

Legend
Qualified for the 2028 Olympics

Group A1
Pos	Team	Pld	Pts
1	Spain	0	0
2	Norway	0	0
3	Republic of Ireland	0	0
4	Switzerland	0	0

First match(es) will be played: 2 March 2027.
Source: UEFA

Group A3
Pos	Team	Pld	Pts
1	Denmark	0	0
2	Italy	0	0
3	Iceland	0	0
4	Wales	0	0

First match(es) will be played: 2 March 2027.
Source: UEFA

Group A2
Pos	Team	Pld	Pts
1	France	0	0
2	England	0	0
3	Austria	0	0
4	Portugal	0	0

First match(es) will be played: 2 March 2027.
Source: UEFA

Group A4
Pos	Team	Pld	Pts
1	Germany	0	0
2	Netherlands	0	0
3	Sweden	0	0
4	Scotland	0	0

First match(es) will be played: 2 March 2027.
Source: UEFA

=== AFC–CONMEBOL play-off ===
One team from AFC and Argentina, as third-place team in the 2025 Copa América Femenina, will meet to determine the final Olympic qualifier. As of February 2026, no further details have been provided.
