= 2027 UEFA Women's Nations League B =

Tournament details
- Dates: League phase: 2 March – 15 June 2027; Relegation matches: 4–12 October 2027
- Teams: 16

Tournament statistics
- Attendance: 0
- Women's European Qualifiers Women's Nations League

League B of the 2027 UEFA Women's Nations League will help to determine the leagues for the UEFA Women's Euro 2029 qualifying competition.

== Seeding ==
Teams were allocated to League B according to the 2027 FIFA Women's World Cup qualifying overall league rankings and were seeded into four pots of four teams. For political reasons, Serbia and Kosovo, as well as Belarus and Ukraine, could not be drawn in the same group. The draw for the league phase took place on 3 November 2026.

Pot 1
Team	Rank
Slovenia	17
Poland	18
Serbia	19
Ukraine	20

Pot 2
Team	Rank
Finland	21
Belgium	22
Turkey	23
Czech Republic	24

Pot 3
Team	Rank
Albania	25
Northern Ireland	26
Hungary	27
Greece	28

Pot 4
Team	Rank
Romania	29
Belarus	30
Kosovo	31
Lithuania	32

== Groups ==
The fixture list was confirmed by UEFA following the draw. Times are CET/CEST, (Note: CET (UTC+1) for matches in March (matchdays 1–2), and CEST (UTC+2) for matches in April and June (matchdays 3–6).) as listed by UEFA (local times, if different, are in parentheses).

=== Group B1 ===
Pos	Team	Pld	W	D	L	GF	GA	GD	Pts	Promotion, qualification or relegation	(Serbia)	(Belgium)	(Albania)	(Romania)
1	Serbia	0	0	0	0	0	0	0	0	Promoted to League A	—	2 Mar	20 Apr	24 Apr
2	Belgium	0	0	0	0	0	0	0	0	Qualification for promotion play-offs	15 Jun	—	11 Jun	10 Apr
3	Albania	0	0	0	0	0	0	0	0	Qualification for relegation play-offs	6 Mar	24 Apr	—	2 Mar
4	Romania	0	0	0	0	0	0	0	0	Relegation to League C	11 Jun	6 Mar	15 Jun	—

First match(es) will be played: 2 March 2027. Source: UEFA
Rules for classification: Tiebreakers
2 March 2027

Serbia	v	Belgium
	Report

2 March 2027

Albania	v	Romania
	Report

6 March 2027

Albania	v	Serbia
	Report

6 March 2027

Romania	v	Belgium
	Report

20 April 2027

Serbia	v	Albania
	Report

20 April 2027

Belgium	v	Romania
	Report

24 April 2027

Serbia	v	Romania
	Report

24 April 2027

Albania	v	Belgium
	Report

11 June 2027

Belgium	v	Albania
	Report

11 June 2027

Romania	v	Serbia
	Report

15 June 2027

Belgium	v	Serbia
	Report

15 June 2027

Romania	v	Albania
	Report

=== Group B2 ===
Pos	Team	Pld	W	D	L	GF	GA	GD	Pts	Promotion, qualification or relegation	(Ukraine)	(Czech Republic)	(Greece)	(Lithuania)
1	Ukraine	0	0	0	0	0	0	0	0	Promoted to League A	—	11 Jun	15 Jun	2 Mar
2	Czech Republic	0	0	0	0	0	0	0	0	Qualification for promotion play-offs	6 Mar	—	24 Apr	20 Apr
3	Greece	0	0	0	0	0	0	0	0	Qualification for relegation play-offs	20 Apr	2 Mar	—	6 Mar
4	Lithuania	0	0	0	0	0	0	0	0	Relegation to League C	24 Apr	15 Jun	11 Jun	—

First match(es) will be played: 2 March 2027. Source: UEFA
Rules for classification: Tiebreakers
2 March 2027

Ukraine	v	Lithuania
	Report

(Note: Due to the Russian invasion of Ukraine, Ukraine are required to play their home matches at neutral venues until further notice.)
2 March 2027

Greece	v	Czech Republic
	Report

6 March 2027

Czech Republic	v	Ukraine
	Report

6 March 2027

Greece	v	Lithuania
	Report

20 April 2027

Czech Republic	v	Lithuania
	Report

20 April 2027

Greece	v	Ukraine
	Report

24 April 2027

Lithuania	v	Ukraine
	Report

24 April 2027

Czech Republic	v	Greece
	Report

11 June 2027

Ukraine	v	Czech Republic
	Report

11 June 2027

Lithuania	v	Greece
	Report

15 June 2027

Ukraine	v	Greece
	Report

15 June 2027

Lithuania	v	Czech Republic
	Report

=== Group B3 ===
Pos	Team	Pld	W	D	L	GF	GA	GD	Pts	Promotion, qualification or relegation	(Poland)	(Finland)	(Northern Ireland)	(Belarus)
1	Poland	0	0	0	0	0	0	0	0	Promoted to League A	—	6 Mar	15 Jun	20 Apr
2	Finland	0	0	0	0	0	0	0	0	Qualification for promotion play-offs	24 Apr	—	20 Apr	15 Jun
3	Northern Ireland	0	0	0	0	0	0	0	0	Qualification for relegation play-offs	2 Mar	11 Jun	—	6 Mar
4	Belarus	0	0	0	0	0	0	0	0	Relegation to League C	11 Jun	2 Mar	24 Apr	—

First match(es) will be played: 2 March 2027. Source: UEFA
Rules for classification: Tiebreakers
2 March 2027

Northern Ireland	v	Poland
	Report

2 March 2027

Belarus	v	Finland
	Report

(Note: Due to Belarusian involvement in the Russian invasion of Ukraine, Belarus are required to play their home matches at neutral venues, and behind closed doors, until further notice.)
Attendance: 0

6 March 2027

Poland	v	Finland
	Report

6 March 2027

Northern Ireland	v	Belarus
	Report

20 April 2027

Poland	v	Belarus
	Report

20 April 2027

Finland	v	Northern Ireland
	Report

24 April 2027

Finland	v	Poland
	Report

24 April 2027

Belarus	v	Northern Ireland
	Report

Attendance: 0

11 June 2027

Northern Ireland	v	Finland
	Report

11 June 2027

Belarus	v	Poland
	Report

Attendance: 0

15 June 2027

Poland	v	Northern Ireland
	Report

15 June 2027

Finland	v	Belarus
	Report

=== Group B4 ===
Pos	Team	Pld	W	D	L	GF	GA	GD	Pts	Promotion, qualification or relegation	(Slovenia)	(Turkey)	(Hungary)	(Kosovo)
1	Slovenia	0	0	0	0	0	0	0	0	Promoted to League A	—	2 Mar	15 Jun	24 Apr
2	Turkey	0	0	0	0	0	0	0	0	Qualification for promotion play-offs	11 Jun	—	20 Apr	6 Mar
3	Hungary	0	0	0	0	0	0	0	0	Qualification for relegation play-offs	6 Mar	24 Apr	—	2 Mar
4	Kosovo	0	0	0	0	0	0	0	0	Relegation to League C	20 Apr	15 Jun	11 Jun	—

First match(es) will be played: 2 March 2027. Source: UEFA
Rules for classification: Tiebreakers
2 March 2027

Slovenia	v	Turkey
	Report

2 March 2027

Hungary	v	Kosovo
	Report

6 March 2027

Turkey	v	Kosovo
	Report

6 March 2027

Hungary	v	Slovenia
	Report

20 April 2027

Turkey	v	Hungary
	Report

20 April 2027

Kosovo	v	Slovenia
	Report

24 April 2027

Slovenia	v	Kosovo
	Report

24 April 2027

Hungary	v	Turkey
	Report

11 June 2027

Turkey	v	Slovenia
	Report

11 June 2027

Kosovo	v	Hungary
	Report

15 June 2027

Slovenia	v	Hungary
	Report

15 June 2027

Kosovo	v	Turkey
	Report
