= Iceland at the UEFA Women's Championship =

Iceland have participated 4 times at the UEFA Women's Championship: Their best achievement is reaching the UEFA Women's Championships quarter final in (2009).

== UEFA Women's Championship ==
UEFA Women's Championship record									Qualifying record								
Year	Result	GP	W	D*	L	GF	GA	GD	GP	W	D*	L	GF	GA	GD	P/R	Rnk
1984	Did not qualify								6	0	1	5	2	19	−17		
(Norway) 1987	Did not enter								Did not enter								
(West Germany) 1989	Did not enter								Did not enter								
(Denmark) 1991	Did not enter								Did not enter								
(Italy) 1993	Did not qualify								4	1	1	2	3	7	−4		
(Germany) 1995	Did not qualify								6	4	0	2	14	6	+8		
(Norway) (Sweden) 1997	Did not qualify								8	2	1	5	8	21	−13		
(Germany) 2001	Did not qualify								8	1	3	4	14	19	−5		
(England) 2005	Did not qualify								10	4	1	5	26	20	+6		
(Finland) 2009	Group stage	3	0	0	3	1	5	−4	10	7	1	2	31	5	+26		
(Sweden) 2013	Quarter-finals	4	1	1	2	2	8	−6	12	9	1	2	34	8	+26		
(Netherlands) 2017	Group stage	3	0	0	3	1	6	−5	8	7	0	1	34	2	+32		
(England) 2022	Group stage	3	0	3	0	3	3	0	8	6	1	1	25	5	+20		
(Switzerland) 2025	Group stage	3	0	0	3	3	7	−4	6	4	1	1	11	5	+6	(Note: From Euro 2025 onwards a new qualifying format was introduced, linked to the Women's Nations League where teams are divided into leagues with promotion/relegation between the leagues at the end of each cycle.)	5th
(Germany) 2029																	
Total	5/14	16	1	4	11	10	29	–19	86	45	11	30	202	117	+85		

*Draws include knockout matches decided on penalty kicks.
