= 2027 FIFA Women's World Cup qualification (UEFA) =

Tournament details
- Dates: 3 March – 5 December 2026
- Teams: 53 (from 1 confederation)

Tournament statistics
- Matches played: 182
- Goals scored: 654 (3.59 per match)
- Attendance: 714,697 (3,927 per match)
- Top scorer: (Scotland women's national football team) Caroline Weir (11 goals)
- Women's Nations League Women's World Cup qualifying All statistics correct as of 13 October 2026.

The European qualifying tournament for the 2027 FIFA Women's World Cup determines the UEFA teams that will qualify directly for the final tournament and for the inter-confederation play-offs will take place from 3 March to 5 December 2026. The results from the first phase of qualification will also be used to determine the leagues for the 2027 UEFA Women's Nations League.

== Format ==
On 24 September 2024, UEFA approved the initial regulations and tentative match schedule for qualification. Following FIFA's confirmation of qualification slots, UEFA finalized the regulations for qualification which will occur over two phases:

- League phase: The teams entering qualification were divided into three leagues based on the 2025 UEFA Women's Nations League overall phase rankings (Regulations Article 21):
  - League A consisted of the teams ranked 1–16 drawn into four groups of four teams each.
  - League B consisted of the teams ranked 17–32 drawn into four groups of four teams each.
  - League C consisted of the teams ranked 33–53 drawn into three groups of four teams each and three groups of three teams each.

All groups played a league format, playing all other teams at home and away (Regulations Article 22). The League A group winners qualified directly for the Women's World Cup, and two rounds of play-offs will determine the remaining direct qualification slots and the inter-confederation play-offs representatives (Regulations Articles 27.01–27.02).

- Play-off phase: Teams were drawn into paths to play two rounds of home-and-away knockout matches (Regulations Articles 27.03–27.08):
  - Round 1:
    - Path 1 consists of the runners-up and third-place teams from League A competing against the group winners and two best-ranked runners-up from League C. The League A teams were seeded and will play the second leg at home.
    - Path 2 consists of the fourth-place teams from League A and League B group winners competing against the runners-up and third-place teams from League B. The League A fourth-place teams and League B group winners were seeded and will play the second leg at home.
    - The winners of each two-legged tie will advance to Round 2.
  - Round 2:
    - The path 1 winners will compete against the path 2 winners. The path 1 winners will be seeded and will play the second leg at home.
    - The seven round 2 winners with the best overall league phase rankings will qualify directly for the Women's World Cup, and the remaining round 2 winner will advance to the inter-confederation play-offs.

The league phase also determined the composition of the 2027 UEFA Women's Nations League, which uses an identical league structure. The group winners of League B and League C have been promoted to the higher league for that competition, while the fourth-place teams in Leagues A and League B, as well as the two lowest-ranked third-place teams in League B, have been relegated to the lower league.

== Tiebreakers ==
During the league phase, teams were ranked according to points (3 points for a win, 1 point for a draw, 0 points for a loss). Tiebreaking criteria were applied to teams tied on points (Regulations Article 23):

1. higher number of points obtained in matches among the tied teams;
2. greater goal difference obtained in matches among the tied teams;
3. greater number of goals scored in matches among the tied teams;
4. if teams remain tied, then criteria a–c are reapplied only to those teams that remain tied;

If teams still remain tied, then the following criteria are applied only to those teams that remain tied:

5. greater goal difference in all league phase matches;
6. greater number of goals scored in all league phase matches;
7. greater number of away goals scored in all league phase matches;
8. greater number of wins in all league phase matches;
9. greater number of away wins in all league phase matches;
10. lower total of disciplinary points obtained by players and team officials in all league phase matches:
  1. Yellow card: 1 point;
  2. Second yellow card/indirect red card: 3 points;
  3. Direct red card: 3 points;
11. higher position in the 2025 UEFA Women's Nations League overall phase rankings

== Schedule ==
The draw and match schedule is below.

| Stage | Round | Dates |
|---|---|---|
| League phase | Draw | 4 November 2025 |
| League phase | Matchday 1 | 3 March 2026 |
| League phase | Matchday 2 | 7 March 2026 |
| League phase | Matchday 3 | 14 April 2026 |
| League phase | Matchday 4 | 18 April 2026 |
| League phase | Matchday 5 | 5 June 2026 |
| League phase | Matchday 6 | 9 June 2026 |
| Play-offs | Round 1 & Round 2 draw | 24 June 2026 |
| Play-offs | Round 1 (two legs) | 7–13 October 2026 |
| Play-offs | Round 2 (two legs) | 26 November – 5 December 2026 |

== Teams ==
Fifty-three nations were eligible to submit entries to compete in qualification.

Gibraltar and Liechtenstein entered World Cup qualifying for the first time, having participated in their first official competitive international tournament in the preceding Women's Nations League.

San Marino did not field a senior women's national team, and Russia were suspended indefinitely in February 2022 from participating in UEFA and FIFA competitions due to their country's invasion of Ukraine and were excluded by UEFA from the list of participants.

Teams were split into leagues based on the 2025 UEFA Women's Nations League overall phase rankings.

Teams were divided into four pots of four teams in Leagues A and B, and three pots of six teams and one pot of three teams in League C. The seedings, pots, and draw procedure were confirmed by UEFA on 30 October 2025.

Key
| ▲ | Promoted after 2025 Women's Nations League |
| ▼ | Relegated after 2025 Women's Nations League |
| * | Participated in promotion/relegation play-offs |

League A
| Pot | Team | Prv | Rank |
|---|---|---|---|
| 1 | France | | 1 |
| 1 | Germany | | 2 |
| 1 | Spain | | 3 |
| 1 | Sweden | | 4 |
| 2 | Netherlands | | 5 |
| 2 | England | | 6 |
| 2 | Italy | | 7 |
| 2 | Norway | | 8 |
| 3 | Denmark (Note: Austria, Belgium, Czech Republic, Denmark, Finland, Iceland, Northern Ireland, and Republic of Ireland participated in the League A vs League B promotion/relegation matches in October 2025 to determine each team's league allocation.) | * | 9 |
| 3 | Austria | * | 10 |
| 3 | Iceland | * | 11 |
| 3 | Poland | ▲ | 12 |
| 4 | Slovenia | ▲ | 13 |
| 4 | Serbia | ▲ | 14 |
| 4 | Ukraine | ▲ | 15 |
| 4 | Republic of Ireland | ▲* | 16 |

League B
| Pot | Team | Prv | Rank |
|---|---|---|---|
| 1 | Belgium | ▼* | 17 |
| 1 | Portugal | ▼ | 18 |
| 1 | Wales | ▼ | 19 |
| 1 | Switzerland | ▼ | 20 |
| 2 | Scotland | ▼ | 21 |
| 2 | Czech Republic | * | 22 |
| 2 | Finland | * | 23 |
| 2 | Northern Ireland | * | 24 |
| 3 | Albania (Note: Albania, Cyprus, Kosovo, and Turkey participated in the League B vs League C promotion/relegation matches in October 2025 to determine each team's league allocation.) | * | 25 |
| 3 | Turkey | * | 26 |
| 3 | Slovakia | ▲ | 27 |
| 3 | Israel | ▲ | 28 |
| 4 | Luxembourg | ▲ | 29 |
| 4 | Malta | ▲ | 30 |
| 4 | Montenegro | ▲ | 31 |
| 4 | Latvia | ▲ | 32 |

League C
| Pot | Team | Prv | Rank |
|---|---|---|---|
| 1 | Bosnia and Herzegovina | ▼ | 33 |
| 1 | Hungary | ▼ | 34 |
| 1 | Romania | ▼ | 35 |
| 1 | Belarus | ▼ | 36 |
| 1 | Croatia | ▼ | 37 |
| 1 | Greece | ▼ | 38 |
| 2 | Cyprus | * | 39 |
| 2 | Kosovo | * | 40 |
| 2 | Azerbaijan | | 41 |
| 2 | Faroe Islands | | 42 |
| 2 | Kazakhstan | | 43 |
| 2 | Estonia | | 44 |
| 3 | Lithuania | | 45 |
| 3 | Armenia | | 46 |
| 3 | Bulgaria | | 47 |
| 3 | Moldova | | 48 |
| 3 | North Macedonia | | 49 |
| 3 | Georgia | | 50 |
| 4 | Andorra | | 51 |
| 4 | Liechtenstein | | 52 |
| 4 | Gibraltar | | 53 |

Did not enter
| Team | Rank |
|---|---|
| San Marino | —N/a |

Banned from entering
| Team | Rank |
|---|---|
| Russia | —N/a |

=== Draw ===
The league phase draw for 2027 FIFA Women's World Cup qualification (UEFA) took place on 4 November 2025 at 13:00 CET.

The following draw conditions were announced:

- For political reasons, matches between the pairs of Armenia–Azerbaijan and Bosnia and Herzegovina–Kosovo were prohibited. No other political prohibitions were required due to the involved teams being in different leagues.
- Teams that played in three-team groups in the 2025 UEFA Women's Nations League C — Azerbaijan, Bulgaria, Estonia, Kosovo, Lithuania, and North Macedonia — were drawn into four-team groups.
- Due to winter venue restrictions, a maximum of two of Iceland (Pot A3), Norway (Pot A2), and Sweden (Pot A1) could be drawn into the same group.

The draw proceeded as follows:

- League C: Teams from Pot 1 were drawn into Groups C1 through C6, in order. The same procedure occurred with Pots 2 and 3, unless a draw condition required placement in a different group. Pot 4 teams were then drawn to Groups C1 through C3.
- League B: Teams from Pots 1 through 4 were drawn into Groups B1 through B4, in order. There were no identified draw conditions for League B.
- League A: Teams from Pots 1 through 4 were drawn into Groups A1 through A4, in order, unless the winter venue restriction required Iceland to be placed in a different group.

== League phase ==
Teams played home-and-away matches against each other team in their group.

=== League A ===
Group winners qualified for the final tournament in Brazil. All other teams advanced to the play-off phase. All fourth-place teams were relegated to 2027 UEFA Women's Nations League B.

==== Group A1 ====
| Pos | Team | Pld | W | D | L | GF | GA | GD | Pts | Qualification or relegation | (Denmark) | (Italy) | (Sweden) | (Serbia) |
|---|---|---|---|---|---|---|---|---|---|---|---|---|---|---|
| 1 | Denmark | 6 | 4 | 2 | 0 | 12 | 5 | +7 | 14 | Qualification to 2027 FIFA Women's World Cup | — | 0–0 | 2–1 | 3–1 |
| 2 | Italy | 6 | 2 | 3 | 1 | 12 | 4 | +8 | 9 | Advance to play-offs | 1–1 | — | 0–1 | 3–0 |
| 3 | Sweden | 6 | 2 | 2 | 2 | 6 | 6 | 0 | 8 | Advance to play-offs | 1–2 | 2–2 | — | 1–0 |
| 4 | Serbia (R) | 6 | 0 | 1 | 5 | 2 | 17 | −15 | 1 | Advance to play-offs and relegation to League B | 1–4 | 0–6 | 0–0 | — |

Source: UEFA
(R) Relegated

==== Group A2 ====
| Pos | Team | Pld | W | D | L | GF | GA | GD | Pts | Qualification or relegation | (France) | (Netherlands) | (Republic of Ireland) | (Poland) |
|---|---|---|---|---|---|---|---|---|---|---|---|---|---|---|
| 1 | France | 6 | 4 | 1 | 1 | 11 | 5 | +6 | 13 | Qualification to 2027 FIFA Women's World Cup | — | 1–1 | 1–0 | 4–1 |
| 2 | Netherlands | 6 | 3 | 2 | 1 | 12 | 9 | +3 | 11 | Advance to play-offs | 2–1 | — | 2–1 | 3–1 |
| 3 | Republic of Ireland | 6 | 3 | 0 | 3 | 9 | 9 | 0 | 9 | Advance to play-offs | 1–2 | 3–2 | — | 1–0 |
| 4 | Poland (R) | 6 | 0 | 1 | 5 | 6 | 15 | −9 | 1 | Advance to play-offs and relegation to League B | 0–2 | 2–2 | 2–3 | — |

Source: UEFA
(R) Relegated

==== Group A3 ====
| Pos | Team | Pld | W | D | L | GF | GA | GD | Pts | Qualification or relegation | (Spain) | (England) | (Iceland) | (Ukraine) |
|---|---|---|---|---|---|---|---|---|---|---|---|---|---|---|
| 1 | Spain | 6 | 5 | 0 | 1 | 21 | 3 | +18 | 15 | Qualification to 2027 FIFA Women's World Cup | — | 4–0 | 3–0 | 5–0 |
| 2 | England | 6 | 5 | 0 | 1 | 13 | 5 | +8 | 15 | Advance to play-offs | 1–0 | — | 2–0 | 3–0 |
| 3 | Iceland | 6 | 2 | 0 | 4 | 3 | 12 | −9 | 6 | Advance to play-offs | 1–6 | 0–1 | — | 1–0 |
| 4 | Ukraine (R) | 6 | 0 | 0 | 6 | 2 | 19 | −17 | 0 | Advance to play-offs and relegation to League B | 1–3 | 1–6 | 0–1 | — |

Source: UEFA
(R) Relegated

==== Group A4 ====
| Pos | Team | Pld | W | D | L | GF | GA | GD | Pts | Qualification or relegation | (Germany) | (Norway) | (Austria) | (Slovenia) |
|---|---|---|---|---|---|---|---|---|---|---|---|---|---|---|
| 1 | Germany | 6 | 5 | 1 | 0 | 18 | 1 | +17 | 16 | Qualification to 2027 FIFA Women's World Cup | — | 2–0 | 5–1 | 5–0 |
| 2 | Norway | 6 | 4 | 0 | 2 | 11 | 9 | +2 | 12 | Advance to play-offs | 0–4 | — | 2–1 | 5–0 |
| 3 | Austria | 6 | 1 | 1 | 4 | 3 | 9 | −6 | 4 | Advance to play-offs | 0–0 | 0–1 | — | 1–0 |
| 4 | Slovenia (R) | 6 | 1 | 0 | 5 | 3 | 16 | −13 | 3 | Advance to play-offs and relegation to League B | 0–2 | 2–3 | 1–0 | — |

Source: UEFA
(R) Relegated

=== League B ===
Group winners, runners-up, and third-place teams advanced to the play-off phase. All group winners were promoted to 2027 UEFA Women's Nations League A, and all fourth-place teams and the two lowest-ranked third-place teams were relegated to 2027 UEFA Women's Nations League C.

==== Group B1 ====
| Pos | Team | Pld | W | D | L | GF | GA | GD | Pts | Promotion, qualification or relegation | (Wales) | (Czech Republic) | (Albania) | (Montenegro) |
|---|---|---|---|---|---|---|---|---|---|---|---|---|---|---|
| 1 | Wales (P) | 6 | 4 | 2 | 0 | 17 | 5 | +12 | 14 | Advance to play-offs and promotion to League A | — | 3–1 | 4–0 | 6–1 |
| 2 | Czech Republic | 6 | 3 | 2 | 1 | 18 | 8 | +10 | 11 | Advance to play-offs | 2–2 | — | 1–1 | 5–0 |
| 3 | Albania | 6 | 2 | 1 | 3 | 9 | 14 | −5 | 7 | Advance to play-offs | 0–1 | 1–5 | — | 5–2 |
| 4 | Montenegro (R) | 6 | 0 | 1 | 5 | 6 | 23 | −17 | 1 | Relegation to League C | 1–1 | 1–4 | 1–2 | — |

Source: UEFA
(P) Promoted; (R) Relegated

==== Group B2 ====
| Pos | Team | Pld | W | D | L | GF | GA | GD | Pts | Promotion, qualification or relegation | (Switzerland) | (Turkey) | (Northern Ireland) | (Malta) |
|---|---|---|---|---|---|---|---|---|---|---|---|---|---|---|
| 1 | Switzerland (P) | 6 | 5 | 1 | 0 | 18 | 5 | +13 | 16 | Advance to play-offs and promotion to League A | — | 3–1 | 2–0 | 6–1 |
| 2 | Turkey | 6 | 4 | 1 | 1 | 11 | 5 | +6 | 13 | Advance to play-offs | 1–1 | — | 2–1 | 3–0 |
| 3 | Northern Ireland | 6 | 2 | 0 | 4 | 10 | 9 | +1 | 6 | Advance to play-offs | 1–2 | 0–1 | — | 4–0 |
| 4 | Malta (R) | 6 | 0 | 0 | 6 | 4 | 24 | −20 | 0 | Relegation to League C | 1–4 | 0–3 | 2–4 | — |

Source: UEFA
(P) Promoted; (R) Relegated

==== Group B3 ====
| Pos | Team | Pld | W | D | L | GF | GA | GD | Pts | Promotion, qualification or relegation | (Portugal) | (Finland) | (Slovakia) | (Latvia) |
|---|---|---|---|---|---|---|---|---|---|---|---|---|---|---|
| 1 | Portugal (P) | 6 | 5 | 0 | 1 | 17 | 4 | +13 | 15 | Advance to play-offs and promotion to League A | — | 2–0 | 4–0 | 5–0 |
| 2 | Finland | 6 | 5 | 0 | 1 | 15 | 6 | +9 | 15 | Advance to play-offs | 3–1 | — | 4–2 | 3–1 |
| 3 | Slovakia (R) | 6 | 2 | 0 | 4 | 8 | 17 | −9 | 6 | Advance to play-offs and relegation to League C | 1–2 | 0–4 | — | 3–2 |
| 4 | Latvia (R) | 6 | 0 | 0 | 6 | 4 | 17 | −13 | 0 | Relegation to League C | 0–3 | 0–1 | 1–2 | — |

Source: UEFA
(P) Promoted; (R) Relegated

==== Group B4 ====
| Pos | Team | Pld | W | D | L | GF | GA | GD | Pts | Promotion, qualification or relegation | (Scotland) | (Belgium) | (Israel) | (Luxembourg) |
|---|---|---|---|---|---|---|---|---|---|---|---|---|---|---|
| 1 | Scotland (P) | 6 | 4 | 2 | 0 | 24 | 2 | +22 | 14 | Advance to play-offs and promotion to League A | — | 1–1 | 6–0 | 7–0 |
| 2 | Belgium | 6 | 4 | 2 | 0 | 22 | 1 | +21 | 14 | Advance to play-offs | 0–0 | — | 5–0 | 6–0 |
| 3 | Israel (R) | 6 | 2 | 0 | 4 | 10 | 20 | −10 | 6 | Advance to play-offs and relegation to League C | 1–5 | 0–3 | — | 6–0 |
| 4 | Luxembourg (R) | 6 | 0 | 0 | 6 | 1 | 34 | −33 | 0 | Relegation to League C | 0–5 | 0–7 | 1–3 | — |

Source: UEFA
(P) Promoted; (R) Relegated

==== Ranking of third-place teams ====
| Pos | Grp | Team | Pld | W | D | L | GF | GA | GD | Pts | Relegation |
|---|---|---|---|---|---|---|---|---|---|---|---|
| 1 | B1 | Albania | 6 | 2 | 1 | 3 | 9 | 14 | −5 | 7 | |
| 2 | B2 | Northern Ireland | 6 | 2 | 0 | 4 | 10 | 9 | +1 | 6 | |
| 3 | B3 | Slovakia | 6 | 2 | 0 | 4 | 8 | 17 | −9 | 6 | Relegation to League C |
| 4 | B4 | Israel | 6 | 2 | 0 | 4 | 10 | 20 | −10 | 6 | Relegation to League C |

Source: UEFA

=== League C ===
Group winners and the two best-ranked runners-up advanced to the play-off phase. All group winners were promoted to 2027 UEFA Women's Nations League B.

==== Group C1 ====
| Pos | Team | Pld | W | D | L | GF | GA | GD | Pts | Promotion or qualification | (Lithuania) | (Bosnia and Herzegovina) | (Estonia) | (Liechtenstein) |
|---|---|---|---|---|---|---|---|---|---|---|---|---|---|---|
| 1 | Lithuania (P) | 6 | 3 | 2 | 1 | 11 | 3 | +8 | 11 (Note: Tied on head-to-head points (5). Ranked on goal difference in head-to-head matches: Lithuania +1, Bosnia and Herzegovina 0, Estonia -1.) | Advance to play-offs and promotion to League B | — | 2–0 | 0–0 | 2–0 |
| 2 | Bosnia and Herzegovina | 6 | 3 | 2 | 1 | 23 | 5 | +18 | 11 | | 0–0 | — | 3–1 | 13–1 |
| 3 | Estonia | 6 | 3 | 2 | 1 | 11 | 6 | +5 | 11 | | 2–1 | 1–1 | — | 2–1 |
| 4 | Liechtenstein | 6 | 0 | 0 | 6 | 3 | 34 | −31 | 0 | | 1–6 | 0–6 | 0–5 | — |

Source: UEFA
(P) Promoted

==== Group C2 ====
| Pos | Team | Pld | W | D | L | GF | GA | GD | Pts | Promotion or qualification | (Kosovo) | (Croatia) | (Bulgaria) | (Gibraltar) |
|---|---|---|---|---|---|---|---|---|---|---|---|---|---|---|
| 1 | Kosovo (P) | 6 | 5 | 0 | 1 | 20 | 3 | +17 | 15 | Advance to play-offs and promotion to League B | — | 0–1 | 2–1 | 6–0 |
| 2 | Croatia | 6 | 5 | 0 | 1 | 16 | 1 | +15 | 15 | Advance to play-offs | 0–1 | — | 4–0 | 9–0 |
| 3 | Bulgaria | 6 | 2 | 0 | 4 | 10 | 11 | −1 | 6 | | 1–3 | 0–1 | — | 3–1 |
| 4 | Gibraltar | 6 | 0 | 0 | 6 | 1 | 32 | −31 | 0 | | 0–8 | 0–1 | 0–5 | — |

Source: UEFA
(P) Promoted

==== Group C3 ====
| Pos | Team | Pld | W | D | L | GF | GA | GD | Pts | Promotion or qualification | (Hungary) | (Azerbaijan) | (North Macedonia) | (Andorra) |
|---|---|---|---|---|---|---|---|---|---|---|---|---|---|---|
| 1 | Hungary (P) | 6 | 5 | 1 | 0 | 21 | 2 | +19 | 16 | Advance to play-offs and promotion to League B | — | 1–0 | 7–0 | 6–1 |
| 2 | Azerbaijan | 6 | 4 | 0 | 2 | 11 | 5 | +6 | 12 | | 1–2 | — | 2–0 | 2–0 |
| 3 | North Macedonia | 6 | 2 | 0 | 4 | 5 | 17 | −12 | 6 | | 0–5 | 1–3 | — | 3–0 |
| 4 | Andorra | 6 | 0 | 1 | 5 | 2 | 15 | −13 | 1 | | 0–0 | 1–3 | 0–1 | — |

Source: UEFA
(P) Promoted

==== Group C4 ====
| Pos | Team | Pld | W | D | L | GF | GA | GD | Pts | Promotion or qualification | (Greece) | (Faroe Islands) | (Georgia (country)) |
|---|---|---|---|---|---|---|---|---|---|---|---|---|---|
| 1 | Greece (P) | 4 | 4 | 0 | 0 | 11 | 4 | +7 | 12 | Advance to play-offs and promotion to League B | — | 2–0 | 3–0 |
| 2 | Faroe Islands | 4 | 2 | 0 | 2 | 6 | 7 | −1 | 6 | | 2–3 | — | 1–0 |
| 3 | Georgia | 4 | 0 | 0 | 4 | 4 | 10 | −6 | 0 | | 2–3 | 2–3 | — |

Source: UEFA
(P) Promoted

==== Group C5 ====
| Pos | Team | Pld | W | D | L | GF | GA | GD | Pts | Promotion or qualification | (Romania) | (Moldova) | (Cyprus) |
|---|---|---|---|---|---|---|---|---|---|---|---|---|---|
| 1 | Romania (P) | 4 | 3 | 1 | 0 | 8 | 0 | +8 | 10 | Advance to play-offs and promotion to League B | — | 1–0 | 3–0 |
| 2 | Moldova | 4 | 1 | 2 | 1 | 2 | 1 | +1 | 5 | | 0–0 | — | 0–0 |
| 3 | Cyprus | 4 | 0 | 1 | 3 | 0 | 9 | −9 | 1 | | 0–4 | 0–2 | — |

Source: UEFA
(P) Promoted

==== Group C6 ====
| Pos | Team | Pld | W | D | L | GF | GA | GD | Pts | Promotion or qualification | (Belarus) | (Kazakhstan) | (Armenia) |
|---|---|---|---|---|---|---|---|---|---|---|---|---|---|
| 1 | Belarus (P) | 4 | 3 | 0 | 1 | 10 | 1 | +9 | 9 | Advance to play-offs and promotion to League B | — | 0–1 | 6–0 |
| 2 | Kazakhstan | 4 | 2 | 1 | 1 | 5 | 2 | +3 | 7 | Advance to play-offs | 0–1 | — | 3–0 |
| 3 | Armenia | 4 | 0 | 1 | 3 | 1 | 13 | −12 | 1 | | 0–3 | 1–1 | — |

Source: UEFA
(P) Promoted

==== Ranking of runners-up ====
| Pos | Grp | Team (Note: Due to differing group sizes, results against fourth-place teams were not considered when ranking runners-up.) | Pld | W | D | L | GF | GA | GD | Pts | Qualification |
|---|---|---|---|---|---|---|---|---|---|---|---|
| 1 | C2 | Croatia | 4 | 3 | 0 | 1 | 6 | 1 | +5 | 9 | Advance to play-offs |
| 2 | C6 | Kazakhstan | 4 | 2 | 1 | 1 | 5 | 2 | +3 | 7 | Advance to play-offs |
| 3 | C3 | Azerbaijan | 4 | 2 | 0 | 2 | 6 | 4 | +2 | 6 | |
| 4 | C4 | Faroe Islands | 4 | 2 | 0 | 2 | 6 | 7 | −1 | 6 | |
| 5 | C5 | Moldova | 4 | 1 | 2 | 1 | 2 | 1 | +1 | 5 | |
| 6 | C1 | Bosnia and Herzegovina | 4 | 1 | 2 | 1 | 4 | 4 | 0 | 5 | |

Source: UEFA

=== Overall league rankings ===
At the conclusion of the league phase, teams were ranked according to the following criteria (Regulations Article 24.01):

1. group position (i.e. all group winners will be ranked above all group runners-up in the same league, etc.);
2. higher number of points;
3. greater goal difference in all league matches;
4. greater number of goals scored in all league matches;
5. greater number of away goals scored in all league matches;
6. greater number of wins in all league matches;
7. greater number of away wins in all league matches;
8. lower total of disciplinary points obtained by players and team officials in all league phase matches:
  1. Yellow card: 1 point;
  2. Second yellow card/indirect red card: 3 points;
  3. Direct red card: 3 points;
9. higher position in the 2025 UEFA Women's Nations League overall phase rankings

League A
| Pos | Team | Pld | Pts |
|---|---|---|---|
| 1 | Germany | 6 | 16 |
| 2 | Spain | 6 | 15 |
| 3 | Denmark | 6 | 14 |
| 4 | France | 6 | 13 |
| 5 | England | 6 | 15 |
| 6 | Norway | 6 | 12 |
| 7 | Netherlands | 6 | 11 |
| 8 | Italy | 6 | 9 |
| 9 | Republic of Ireland | 6 | 9 |
| 10 | Sweden | 6 | 8 |
| 11 | Iceland | 6 | 6 |
| 12 | Austria | 6 | 4 |
| 13 | Slovenia | 6 | 3 |
| 14 | Poland | 6 | 1 |
| 15 | Serbia | 6 | 1 |
| 16 | Ukraine | 6 | 0 |

Source: UEFA

League B
| Pos | Team | Pld | Pts |
|---|---|---|---|
| 17 | Switzerland | 6 | 16 |
| 18 | Portugal | 6 | 15 |
| 19 | Scotland | 6 | 14 |
| 20 | Wales | 6 | 14 |
| 21 | Finland | 6 | 15 |
| 22 | Belgium | 6 | 14 |
| 23 | Turkey | 6 | 13 |
| 24 | Czech Republic | 6 | 11 |
| 25 | Albania | 6 | 7 |
| 26 | Northern Ireland | 6 | 6 |
| 27 | Slovakia | 6 | 6 |
| 28 | Israel | 6 | 6 |
| 29 | Montenegro | 6 | 1 |
| 30 | Latvia | 6 | 0 |
| 31 | Malta | 6 | 0 |
| 32 | Luxembourg | 6 | 0 |

Source: UEFA

League C
| Pos | Team (Note: Due to differing group sizes in League C, results against fourth-place teams were not considered when ranking group winners, runners-up, and third-place teams.) | Pld | Pts |
|---|---|---|---|
| 33 | Hungary | 4 | 12 |
| 34 | Greece | 4 | 12 |
| 35 | Romania | 4 | 10 |
| 36 | Belarus | 4 | 9 |
| 37 | Kosovo | 4 | 9 |
| 38 | Lithuania | 4 | 5 |
| 39 | Croatia | 4 | 9 |
| 40 | Kazakhstan | 4 | 7 |
| 41 | Azerbaijan | 4 | 6 |
| 42 | Faroe Islands | 4 | 6 |
| 43 | Moldova | 4 | 5 |
| 44 | Bosnia and Herzegovina | 4 | 5 |
| 45 | Estonia | 4 | 5 |
| 46 | Cyprus | 4 | 1 |
| 47 | Armenia | 4 | 1 |
| 48 | Georgia | 4 | 0 |
| 49 | Bulgaria | 4 | 0 |
| 50 | North Macedonia | 4 | 0 |
| 51 | Andorra | 6 | 1 |
| 52 | Liechtenstein | 6 | 0 |
| 53 | Gibraltar | 6 | 0 |

Source: UEFA

== Play-off phase ==
=== Draws ===
The draws for both play-off rounds were held on 18 June 2026.

=== Round 1 ===
Path 1
| Team 1 | Agg. | Team 2 | 1st leg | 2nd leg |
|---|---|---|---|---|
| Lithuania | 0–15 | Sweden | 0–5 | 0–10 |
| Romania | 0–8 | Norway | 0–2 | 0–6 |
| Greece | 1–8 | England | 1–3 | 0–5 |
| Croatia | 0–9 | Iceland | 0–4 | 0–5 |
| Kazakhstan | 0–12 | Republic of Ireland | 0–8 | 0–4 |
| Kosovo | 1–6 | Austria | 1–2 | 0–4 |
| Hungary | 0–11 | Netherlands | 0–8 | 0–3 |
| Belarus | 1–3 | Italy | 0–2 | 1–1 |

Path 2
| Team 1 | Agg. | Team 2 | 1st leg | 2nd leg |
|---|---|---|---|---|
| Albania | 0–4 | Wales | 0–1 | 0–3 |
| Turkey | 3–5 | Slovenia | 3–3 | 0–2 |
| Slovakia | 1–4 | Ukraine | 1–3 | 0–1 |
| Israel | 3–9 | Switzerland | 3–7 | 0–2 |
| Belgium | 3–3 (3–4 p) | Poland | 1–0 | 2–3 (a.e.t.) |
| Czech Republic | 2–5 | Scotland | 0–2 | 2–3 |
| Northern Ireland | 1–7 | Portugal | 0–4 | 1–3 |
| Finland | 6–2 | Serbia | 3–1 | 3–1 |

=== Round 2 ===
| Team 1 | Agg. | Team 2 | 1st leg | 2nd leg |
|---|---|---|---|---|
| Ukraine | | England | 1 Dec | 5 Dec |
| Finland | | Italy | 1 Dec | 5 Dec |
| Portugal | | Iceland | 1 Dec | 5 Dec |
| Wales | | Norway | 1 Dec | 5 Dec |
| Switzerland | | Austria | 1 Dec | 5 Dec |
| Scotland | | Sweden | 1 Dec | 5 Dec |
| Poland | | Republic of Ireland | 1 Dec | 5 Dec |
| Slovenia | | Netherlands | 1 Dec | 5 Dec |

== Top goalscorers ==
There have been 654 goals scored in 182 matches, for an average of 3.59 goals per match (as of 13 October 2026). Players highlighted in bold are still active in the competition.

11 goals

- (Scotland women's national football team) **Caroline Weir**

8 goals

- (Belgium women's national football team) Tessa Wullaert

7 goals

- (Wales women's national football team) **Hannah Cain**

6 goals

- (England women's national football team) **Alessia Russo**
- (England women's national football team) **Georgia Stanway**
- (Israel women's national football team) Vital Kats
- (Kosovo women's national football team) Erëleta Memeti
- (Lithuania women's national football team) Rimantė Jonušaitė
- (Netherlands women's national football team) **Lineth Beerensteyn**
- (Portugal women's national football team) **Kika Nazareth**

5 goals

- (Bosnia and Herzegovina women's national football team) Milena Nikolić
- (Czech Republic women's national football team) Klára Cahynová
- (Poland women's national football team) **Ewa Pajor**
- (Portugal women's national football team) **Carolina Santiago**
- (Scotland women's national football team) **Kathleen McGovern**
- (Spain women's national football team) Edna Imade
- (Sweden women's national football team) **Felicia Schröder**
- (Switzerland women's national football team) **Riola Xhemaili**

4 goals

- (Albania women's national football team) Megi Doçi
- (Azerbaijan women's national football team) Sevinj Jafarzade
- (Belgium women's national football team) Hannah Eurlings
- (Croatia women's national football team) Janja Čanjevac
- (Czech Republic women's national football team) Michaela Khýrová
- (Denmark women's national football team) Pernille Harder
- (Finland women's national football team) **Lotta Lindström**
- (France women's national football team) Melvine Malard
- (Hungary women's national football team) Diána Csányi
- (Kosovo women's national football team) Blerta Smaili
- (Netherlands women's national football team) **Victoria Pelova**
- (Republic of Ireland women's national football team) **Katie McCabe**
- (Scotland women's national football team) **Jenna Clark**
- (Spain women's national football team) Vicky López
- (Spain women's national football team) Clàudia Pina
- (Sweden women's national football team) **Stina Blackstenius**
- (Turkey women's national football team) Selen Altunkulak

3 goals

- (Bosnia and Herzegovina women's national football team) Emina Ekić
- (Bosnia and Herzegovina women's national football team) Marija Milinković
- (Denmark women's national football team) Amalie Vangsgaard
- (Estonia women's national football team) Vlada Kubassova
- (Finland women's national football team) **Nea Lehtola**
- (Finland women's national football team) **Ria Öling**
- (France women's national football team) Marie-Antoinette Katoto
- (Germany women's national football team) Vivien Endemann
- (Greece women's national football team) Kallisti Brouksair
- (Hungary women's national football team) Vanessza Nagy
- (Israel women's national football team) Talia Sommer
- (Italy women's national football team) **Martina Piemonte**
- (Kosovo women's national football team) Gentiana Fetaj
- (Kosovo women's national football team) Modesta Uka
- (Netherlands women's national football team) **Esmee Brugts**
- (Norway women's national football team) **Ada Hegerberg**
- (Norway women's national football team) **Elisabeth Terland**
- (Portugal women's national football team) **Ana Capeta**
- (Portugal women's national football team) **Jéssica Silva**
- (Republic of Ireland women's national football team) **Kyra Carusa**
- (Romania women's national football team) Ioana Bălăceanu
- (Scotland women's national football team) **Lauren Davidson**
- (Sweden women's national football team) **Amanda Ilestedt**
- (Switzerland women's national football team) **Iman Beney**
- (Switzerland women's national football team) **Aurélie Csillag**
- (Switzerland women's national football team) **Géraldine Reuteler**
- (Switzerland women's national football team) **Sydney Schertenleib**
- (Wales women's national football team) **Mared Griffiths**
- (Wales women's national football team) **Elise Hughes**

Below are goalscorer lists for all leagues and play-offs:

- League A
- League B
- League C
- Play-offs

== Qualified teams for FIFA Women's World Cup ==
The following eleven teams will qualify for the 2027 FIFA Women's World Cup in Brazil. One more team may qualify via the inter-confederation play-offs.

| Team | Qualified on | Previous appearances in FIFA Women's World Cup (Note: Bold indicates champions for that year. Italic indicates hosts for that year.) |
|---|---|---|
| Germany | 5 June 2026 | 9 (1991, 1995, 1999, **2003**, **2007**, 2011, 2015, 2019, 2023) |
| Denmark | 9 June 2026 | 5 (1991, 1995, 1999, 2007, 2023) |
| Spain | 9 June 2026 | 3 (2015, 2019, **2023**) |
| France | 9 June 2026 | 5 (2003, 2011, 2015, 2019, 2023) |
| TBD | 5 December 2026 | |
| TBD | 5 December 2026 | |
| TBD | 5 December 2026 | |
| TBD | 5 December 2026 | |
| TBD | 5 December 2026 | |
| TBD | 5 December 2026 | |
| TBD | 5 December 2026 | |
