= 2027 UEFA Women's Nations League C =

Tournament details
- Dates: League phase: 2 March – 15 June 2027; Promotion matches: 4–12 October 2027
- Teams: 22

Tournament statistics
- Attendance: 0
- Women's European Qualifiers Women's Nations League

League C is the third and lowest division of the 2027 UEFA Women's Nations League. The results will be used to determine the leagues leagues for the UEFA Women's Euro 2029 qualifying competition.

== Seeding ==
Teams were allocated to League C according to the 2027 FIFA Women's World Cup qualifying overall league rankings and were seeded into three pots of six teams and one pot of four teams. Due to excessive travel restrictions, Kazakhstan could not be drawn into a group containing more than one of Andorra, Gibraltar or Malta. Winter venue restrictions required Latvia, Faroe Islands or Estonia to be placed in different groups. Armenia and Azerbaijan could not be drawn in the same group due to political reasons. San Marino entered the tournament for the first time, with the competition also being their first international tournament.

The draw for the league phase took place on 3 November 2026.

Pot 1
Team	Rank
Slovakia	33
Israel	34
Montenegro	35
Latvia	36
Malta	37
Luxembourg	38

Pot 2
Team	Rank
Croatia	39
Kazakhstan	40
Azerbaijan	41
Faroe Islands	42
Moldova	43
Bosnia and Herzegovina	44

Pot 3
Team	Rank
Estonia	45
Cyprus	46
Armenia	47
Georgia	48
Bulgaria	49
North Macedonia	50

Pot 4
Team	Rank
Andorra	51
Liechtenstein	52
Gibraltar	53
San Marino	54

== Groups ==
The fixture list was confirmed by UEFA following the draw. Times are CET/CEST, (Note: CET (UTC+1) for matches in March (matchdays 1–2), and CEST (UTC+2) for matches in April and June (matchdays 3–6).) as listed by UEFA (local times, if different, are in parentheses).

=== Group C1 ===
Pos	Team	Pld	W	D	L	GF	GA	GD	Pts	Promotion or qualification	(Slovakia)	(Croatia)	(Bulgaria)	(Gibraltar)
1	Slovakia	0	0	0	0	0	0	0	0	Promotion to League B	—	2 Mar	15 Jun	20 Apr
2	Croatia	0	0	0	0	0	0	0	0	Possible qualification for promotion play-offs	11 Jun	—	24 Apr	6 Mar
3	Bulgaria	0	0	0	0	0	0	0	0		6 Mar	20 Apr	—	11 Jun
4	Gibraltar	0	0	0	0	0	0	0	0		24 Apr	15 Jun	2 Mar	—

First match(es) will be played: 2 March 2027. Source: UEFA
Rules for classification: Tiebreakers
2 March 2027

Slovakia	v	Croatia
	Report

2 March 2027

Gibraltar	v	Bulgaria
	Report

6 March 2027

Croatia	v	Gibraltar
	Report

6 March 2027

Bulgaria	v	Slovakia
	Report

20 April 2027

Slovakia	v	Gibraltar
	Report

20 April 2027

Bulgaria	v	Croatia
	Report

24 April 2027

Croatia	v	Bulgaria
	Report

24 April 2027

Gibraltar	v	Slovakia
	Report

11 June 2027

Bulgaria	v	Gibraltar
	Report

11 June 2027

Croatia	v	Slovakia
	Report

15 June 2027

Gibraltar	v	Croatia
	Report

15 June 2027

Slovakia	v	Bulgaria
	Report

=== Group C2 ===
Pos	Team	Pld	W	D	L	GF	GA	GD	Pts	Promotion or qualification	(Latvia)	(Azerbaijan)	(Georgia (country))	(Liechtenstein)
1	Latvia	0	0	0	0	0	0	0	0	Promotion to League B	—	20 Apr	15 Jun	24 Apr
2	Azerbaijan	0	0	0	0	0	0	0	0	Possible qualification for promotion play-offs	11 Jun	—	24 Apr	2 Mar
3	Georgia	0	0	0	0	0	0	0	0		2 Mar	6 Mar	—	11 Jun
4	Liechtenstein	0	0	0	0	0	0	0	0		6 Mar	15 Jun	20 Apr	—

First match(es) will be played: 2 March 2027. Source: UEFA
Rules for classification: Tiebreakers
2 March 2027

Azerbaijan	v	Liechtenstein
	Report

2 March 2027

Georgia	v	Latvia
	Report

6 March 2027

Georgia	v	Azerbaijan
	Report

6 March 2027

Liechtenstein	v	Latvia
	Report

20 April 2027

Latvia	v	Azerbaijan
	Report

20 April 2027

Liechtenstein	v	Georgia
	Report

24 April 2027

Latvia	v	Liechtenstein
	Report

24 April 2027

Azerbaijan	v	Georgia
	Report

11 June 2027

Azerbaijan	v	Latvia
	Report

11 June 2027

Georgia	v	Liechtenstein
	Report

15 June 2027

Latvia	v	Georgia
	Report

15 June 2027

Liechtenstein	v	Azerbaijan
	Report

=== Group C3 ===
Pos	Team	Pld	W	D	L	GF	GA	GD	Pts	Promotion or qualification	(Israel)	(Faroe Islands)	(North Macedonia)	(Andorra)
1	Israel	0	0	0	0	0	0	0	0	Promotion to League B	—	2 Mar	20 Apr	6 Mar
2	Faroe Islands	0	0	0	0	0	0	0	0	Possible qualification for promotion play-offs	24 Apr	—	15 Jun	20 Apr
3	North Macedonia	0	0	0	0	0	0	0	0		11 Jun	6 Mar	—	2 Mar
4	Andorra	0	0	0	0	0	0	0	0		15 Jun	11 Jun	24 Apr	—

First match(es) will be played: 2 March 2027. Source: UEFA
Rules for classification: Tiebreakers
2 March 2027

Israel	v	Faroe Islands
	Report

(Note: Due to the Gaza war, Israel are required to play their home matches at neutral venues until further notice.)
Attendance: 0 (behind closed doors)
2 March 2027

North Macedonia	v	Andorra
	Report

6 March 2027

North Macedonia	v	Faroe Islands
	Report

6 March 2027

Israel	v	Andorra
	Report

Attendance: 0 (behind closed doors)

20 April 2027

Israel	v	North Macedonia
	Report

Attendance: 0 (behind closed doors)
20 April 2027

Faroe Islands	v	Andorra
	Report

24 April 2027

Faroe Islands	v	Israel
	Report

Attendance: 0 (behind closed doors)
24 April 2027

Andorra	v	North Macedonia
	Report

11 June 2027

North Macedonia	v	Israel
	Report

Attendance: 0 (behind closed doors)
11 June 2027

Andorra	v	Faroe Islands
	Report

15 June 2027

Andorra	v	Israel
	Report

Attendance: 0 (behind closed doors)
15 June 2027

Faroe Islands	v	North Macedonia
	Report

=== Group C4 ===
Pos	Team	Pld	W	D	L	GF	GA	GD	Pts	Promotion or qualification	(Luxembourg)	(Bosnia and Herzegovina)	(Estonia)	(San Marino)
1	Luxembourg	0	0	0	0	0	0	0	0	Promotion to League B	—	2 Mar	20 Apr	11 Jun
2	Bosnia and Herzegovina	0	0	0	0	0	0	0	0	Possible qualification for promotion play-offs	24 Apr	—	6 Mar	20 Apr
3	Estonia	0	0	0	0	0	0	0	0		15 Jun	11 Jun	—	24 Apr
4	San Marino	0	0	0	0	0	0	0	0		6 Mar	15 Jun	2 Mar	—

First match(es) will be played: 2 March 2027. Source: UEFA
Rules for classification: Tiebreakers
2 March 2027

Luxembourg	v	Bosnia and Herzegovina
	Report

2 March 2027

San Marino	v	Estonia
	Report

6 March 2027

San Marino	v	Luxembourg
	Report

6 March 2027

Bosnia and Herzegovina	v	Estonia
	Report

20 April 2027

Bosnia and Herzegovina	v	San Marino
	Report

20 April 2027

Luxembourg	v	Estonia
	Report

24 April 2027

Estonia	v	San Marino
	Report

24 April 2027

Bosnia and Herzegovina	v	Luxembourg
	Report

11 June 2027

Estonia	v	Bosnia and Herzegovina
	Report

11 June 2027

Luxembourg	v	San Marino
	Report

15 June 2027

San Marino	v	Bosnia and Herzegovina
	Report

15 June 2027

Estonia	v	Luxembourg
	Report

=== Group C5 ===
Pos	Team	Pld	W	D	L	GF	GA	GD	Pts	Promotion or qualification	(Malta)	(Moldova)	(Cyprus)
1	Malta	0	0	0	0	0	0	0	0	Promotion to League B	—	15 Jun	24 Apr
2	Moldova	0	0	0	0	0	0	0	0	Possible qualification for promotion play-offs	20 Apr	—	11 Jun
3	Cyprus	0	0	0	0	0	0	0	0		6 Mar	2 Mar	—

First match(es) will be played: 2 March 2027. Source: UEFA
Rules for classification: Tiebreakers
2 March 2027

Cyprus	v	Moldova
	Report

6 March 2027

Cyprus	v	Malta
	Report

20 April 2027

Moldova	v	Malta
	Report

24 April 2027

Malta	v	Cyprus
	Report

11 June 2027

Moldova	v	Cyprus
	Report

15 June 2027

Malta	v	Moldova
	Report

=== Group C6 ===
Pos	Team	Pld	W	D	L	GF	GA	GD	Pts	Promotion or qualification	(Montenegro)	(Kazakhstan)	(Armenia)
1	Montenegro	0	0	0	0	0	0	0	0	Promotion to League B	—	11 Jun	6 Mar
2	Kazakhstan	0	0	0	0	0	0	0	0	Possible qualification for promotion play-offs	24 Apr	—	20 Apr
3	Armenia	0	0	0	0	0	0	0	0		15 Jun	2 Mar	—

First match(es) will be played: 2 March 2027. Source: UEFA
Rules for classification: Tiebreakers
2 March 2027

Armenia	v	Kazakhstan
	Report

6 March 2027

Montenegro	v	Armenia
	Report

20 April 2027

Kazakhstan	v	Armenia
	Report

24 April 2027

Kazakhstan	v	Montenegro
	Report

11 June 2027

Montenegro	v	Kazakhstan
	Report

15 June 2027

Armenia	v	Montenegro
	Report

== Ranking of second-placed teams ==
Pos	Grp	Team (Note: Due to differing group sizes, results against fourth-place teams are not considered when ranking runners-up.)	Pld	W	D	L	GF	GA	GD	Pts	Qualification
1	C1	Croatia	0	0	0	0	0	0	0	0	Qualification for promotion play-offs
2	C2	Azerbaijan	0	0	0	0	0	0	0	0	Qualification for promotion play-offs
3	C3	Faroe Islands	0	0	0	0	0	0	0	0	
4	C4	Bosnia and Herzegovina	0	0	0	0	0	0	0	0	
5	C5	Moldova	0	0	0	0	0	0	0	0	
6	C6	Kazakhstan	0	0	0	0	0	0	0	0	

First match(es) will be played: 2 March 2027. Source: UEFA
Rules for classification: Tiebreakers
