= Finland at the UEFA Women's Championship =

Finland have participated 4 times at the UEFA Women's Championship: Their best achievement is reaching the UEFA Women's Championships semi final in (2005).

== UEFA Women's Championship ==
UEFA Women's Championship record									Qualifying record								
Year	Result	GP	W	D*	L	GF	GA	GD	GP	W	D*	L	GF	GA	GD	P/R	Rnk
1984	Did not qualify								6	2	0	4	5	17	−12		
(Norway) 1987	Did not qualify								6	1	2	3	2	6	−4		
(West Germany) 1989	Did not qualify								6	1	2	3	9	11	−2		
(Denmark) 1991	Did not qualify								6	1	2	3	3	6	−3		
(Italy) 1993	Did not qualify								4	0	2	2	3	12	−9		
(Germany) 1995	Did not qualify								6	2	3	1	8	7	+1		
(Norway) (Sweden) 1997	Did not qualify								8	1	1	6	2	24	−22		
(Germany) 2001	Did not qualify								8	2	0	6	8	21	−13		
(England) 2005	Semi-finals	4	1	1	2	5	8	−3	10	4	4	2	16	7	+9		
(Finland) 2009	Quarter-finals	4	2	0	2	5	5	0	Qualified as host								
(Sweden) 2013	Group stage	3	0	2	1	1	6	−5	8	6	1	1	22	4	+18		
(Netherlands) 2017	Did not qualify								8	4	1	3	17	12	+5		
(England) 2022	Group stage	3	0	0	3	1	8	−7	8	7	1	0	24	2	+22		
(Switzerland) 2025	Group stage	3	1	1	1	3	3	0	10	4	3	3	12	12	0	▼ (Note: From Euro 2025 onwards a new qualifying format was introduced, linked to the Women's Nations League where teams are divided into leagues with promotion/relegation between the leagues at the end of each cycle.)	13th
(Germany) 2029	To be determined								To be determined								
Total	5/14	17	4	4	9	15	30	−15	94	35	22	37	131	141	−10	13th	

*Draws include knockout matches decided on penalty kicks.

== Head-to-head record ==
Opponent	Pld	W	D	L	GF	GA	GD	Win %
Denmark	4	2	1	1	4	3	+1	50.00
England	2	0	0	2	4	6	−2	0.00
Germany	2	0	0	2	1	7	−6	0.00
Iceland	1	1	0	0	1	0	+1	100.00
Italy	1	0	1	0	0	0	+0	0.00
Netherlands	1	1	0	0	2	1	+1	100.00
Norway	1	0	0	1	1	2	−1	0.00
Spain	1	0	0	1	1	4	−3	0.00
Sweden	2	0	1	1	0	5	−5	0.00
Switzerland	1	0	1	0	1	1	+0	0.00
Ukraine	1	0	0	1	0	1	−1	0.00
Total	17	4	4	9	15	30	−15	23.53
