= San Marino women's national football team =

Women's association football team

San Marino
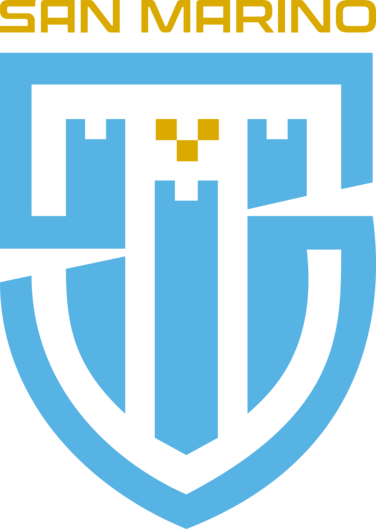
- Association: Federazione Sammarinese Giuoco Calcio (FSGC)
- Confederation: UEFA (Europe)
- Head coach: Giulia Domenichetti
- FIFA code: SMR

The San Marino women's national football team (Italian: Nazionale di calcio femminile di San Marino) represents San Marino in international women's association football competitions. Administered by the San Marino Football Federation (FSGC), it was established in 2026, and competes in UEFA and FIFA competitions.

== History ==
While a lack of players had precluded the establishment of a Sammarinese women's association football, grassroots engagement throughout the 2020s – spurred by domestic programmes and initiatives such as UEFA's Playmakers programme – helped establish a more stable player base. Upon this, the FGSC established a national women's team in April 2026, and appointed former Italian national team player Giulia Domenichetti as its first ever head coach.

== Staff ==
Giulia Domenichetti serves as the team's head coach, while Pierangelo Manzaroli manages the team through his role as the FSGC's head of women's football.

=== Managerial history ===
- (Italy) Giulia Domenichetti (2026–present)

== Results and fixtures ==
The following is a list of match results in the last 12 months, as well as any future matches that have been scheduled.

Legend

Win Draw Lose Fixture

=== 2026 ===
28 November Friendly	San Marino	v	Liechtenstein	Acquaviva, San Marino
17:30 UTC+1				Stadium: Campo Sportivo di Acquaviva

5 December Friendly	San Marino	v	Gibraltar	Acquaviva, San Marino
17:30 UTC+1				Stadium: Campo Sportivo di Acquaviva

== Competitive record ==
=== FIFA Women's World Cup ===
FIFA Women's World Cup record									Qualification record							
Year	Result	Pld	W	D (Note: Draws include knockout matches decided on penalty kicks.)	L	GF	GA	GD	Position	Pld	W	D	L	GF	GA	GD
2031	TBD								TBD							
Total	0/0	—	—	—	—	—	—	—	Total	—	—	—	—	—	—	—

=== UEFA Women's Championship ===
UEFA Women's Championship record									Qualification record									
Year	Result	Pld	W	D	L	GF	GA	GD	Position	Pld	W	D	L	GF	GA	GD	P/R	Rnk
2029	TBD								TBD									
Total	0/0	—	—	—	—	—	—	—	Total	—	—	—	—	—	—	—	—	

=== UEFA Women's Nations League ===
UEFA Women's Nations League record
Year	L	G	Pos	Pld	W	D	L	GF	GA	P/R	Rnk
2027	C	TBD									
Total				—	—	—	—	—	—	—	

▲	Promoted at end of season
Same position	No movement at end of season
▼	Relegated at end of season
*	Participated in promotion/relegation play-offs
