= 2027 UEFA Women's Nations League A =

Tournament details
- Dates: League phase: 2 March – 15 June 2027; Relegation matches: 4–12 October 2027; Nations League Finals: 4 October – 4 December 2027
- Teams: 16

Tournament statistics
- Attendance: 0
- Women's European Qualifiers Women's Nations League

League A of the 2027 UEFA Women's Nations League will determine the four European teams to qualify for the 2028 Summer Olympics in Los Angeles, United States. The results will also be used to determine the leagues for the UEFA Women's Euro 2029 qualifying competition.

== Seeding ==
Teams were allocated to League A according to the 2027 FIFA Women's World Cup qualifying overall league rankings and were seeded into four pots of four teams. England, Scotland and Wales could not be drawn in the same group as they unite as Great Britain for the Olympics. The draw for the league phase took place on 3 November 2026.

Pot 1
Team	Rank
Germany	1
Spain	2
Denmark	3
France	4

Pot 2
Team	Rank
England	5
Norway	6
Netherlands	7
Italy	8

Pot 3
Team	Rank
Republic of Ireland	9
Sweden	10
Iceland	11
Austria	12

Pot 4
Team	Rank
Switzerland	13
Portugal	14
Scotland	15
Wales	16

== Groups ==
The fixture list was confirmed by UEFA following the draw. Times are CET/CEST, (Note: CET (UTC+1) for matches until 28 March 2027 (matchdays 1–2), and CEST (UTC+2) for matches thereafter (matchdays 3–6).) as listed by UEFA (local times, if different, are in parentheses).

=== Group A1 ===
Pos	Team	Pld	W	D	L	GF	GA	GD	Pts	Promotion, qualification or relegation	(Spain)	(Norway)	(Republic of Ireland)	(Switzerland)
1	Spain	0	0	0	0	0	0	0	0	Qualification to 2028 Summer Olympics and Nations League Finals	—	2 Mar	20 Apr	15 Jun
2	Norway	0	0	0	0	0	0	0	0		24 Apr	—	15 Jun	20 Apr
3	Republic of Ireland	0	0	0	0	0	0	0	0	Qualification for relegation play-offs	11 Jun	2 Mar	—	6 Mar
4	Switzerland	0	0	0	0	0	0	0	0	Relegation to League B	6 Mar	11 Jun	24 Apr	—

First match(es) will be played: 2 March 2027. Source: UEFA
Rules for classification: Tiebreakers
2 March 2027

Spain	v	Norway
	Report

2 March 2027

Republic of Ireland	v	Switzerland
	Report

6 March 2027

Republic of Ireland	v	Norway
	Report

6 March 2027

Switzerland	v	Spain
	Report

20 April 2027

Spain	v	Republic of Ireland
	Report

20 April 2027

Norway	v	Switzerland
	Report

24 April 2027

Norway	v	Spain
	Report

24 April 2027

Switzerland	v	Republic of Ireland
	Report

11 June 2027

Republic of Ireland	v	Spain
	Report

11 June 2027

Switzerland	v	Norway
	Report

15 June 2027

Spain	v	Switzerland
	Report

15 June 2027

Norway	v	Republic of Ireland
	Report

=== Group A2 ===
Pos	Team	Pld	W	D	L	GF	GA	GD	Pts	Promotion, qualification or relegation	(France)	(England)	(Austria)	(Portugal)
1	France	0	0	0	0	0	0	0	0	Qualification to 2028 Summer Olympics and Nations League Finals	—	11 Jun	2 Mar	23 Apr
2	England	0	0	0	0	0	0	0	0		6 Mar	—	18 Apr	15 Jun
3	Austria	0	0	0	0	0	0	0	0	Qualification for relegation play-offs	15 Jun	23 Apr	—	6 Mar
4	Portugal	0	0	0	0	0	0	0	0	Relegation to League B	19 Apr	2 Mar	11 Jun	—

First match(es) will be played: 2 March 2027. Source: UEFA
Rules for classification: Tiebreakers
2 March 2027

France	v	Austria
	Report

2 March 2027

Portugal	v	England
	Report

6 March 2027

England	v	France
	Report

6 March 2027

Austria	v	Portugal
	Report

18 April 2027

England	v	Austria
	Report

19 April 2027

Portugal	v	France
	Report

23 April 2027

France	v	Portugal
	Report

23 April 2027

Austria	v	England
	Report

11 June 2027

France	v	England
	Report

11 June 2027

Portugal	v	Austria
	Report

15 June 2027

England	v	Portugal
	Report

15 June 2027

Austria	v	France
	Report

=== Group A3 ===
Pos	Team	Pld	W	D	L	GF	GA	GD	Pts	Promotion, qualification or relegation	(Denmark)	(Italy)	(Iceland)	(Wales)
1	Denmark	0	0	0	0	0	0	0	0	Qualification to 2028 Summer Olympics and Nations League Finals	—	2 Mar	11 Jun	24 Apr
2	Italy	0	0	0	0	0	0	0	0		15 Jun	—	6 Mar	20 Apr
3	Iceland	0	0	0	0	0	0	0	0	Qualification for relegation play-offs	20 Apr	24 Apr	—	15 Jun
4	Wales	0	0	0	0	0	0	0	0	Relegation to League B	6 Mar	11 Jun	2 Mar	—

First match(es) will be played: 2 March 2027. Source: UEFA
Rules for classification: Tiebreakers
2 March 2027

Denmark	v	Italy
	Report

2 March 2027

Wales	v	Iceland
	Report

6 March 2027

Italy	v	Iceland
	Report

6 March 2027

Wales	v	Denmark
	Report

20 April 2027

Italy	v	Wales
	Report

20 April 2027

Iceland	v	Denmark
	Report

24 April 2027

Denmark	v	Wales
	Report

24 April 2027

Iceland	v	Italy
	Report

11 June 2027

Denmark	v	Iceland
	Report

11 June 2027

Wales	v	Italy
	Report

15 June 2027

Italy	v	Denmark
	Report

15 June 2027

Iceland	v	Wales
	Report

=== Group A4 ===
Pos	Team	Pld	W	D	L	GF	GA	GD	Pts	Promotion, qualification or relegation	(Germany)	(Netherlands)	(Sweden)	(Scotland)
1	Germany	0	0	0	0	0	0	0	0	Qualification to 2028 Summer Olympics and Nations League Finals	—	20 Apr	15 Jun	6 Mar
2	Netherlands	0	0	0	0	0	0	0	0		24 Apr	—	6 Mar	15 Jun
3	Sweden	0	0	0	0	0	0	0	0	Qualification for relegation play-offs	2 Mar	11 Jun	—	20 Apr
4	Scotland	0	0	0	0	0	0	0	0	Relegation to League B	11 Jun	2 Mar	24 Apr	—

First match(es) will be played: 2 March 2027. Source: UEFA
Rules for classification: Tiebreakers
2 March 2027

Sweden	v	Germany
	Report

2 March 2027

Scotland	v	Netherlands
	Report

6 March 2027

Germany	v	Scotland
	Report

6 March 2027

Netherlands	v	Sweden
	Report

20 April 2027

Germany	v	Netherlands
	Report

20 April 2027

Sweden	v	Scotland
	Report

24 April 2027

Netherlands	v	Germany
	Report

24 April 2027

Scotland	v	Sweden
	Report

11 June 2027

Sweden	v	Netherlands
	Report

11 June 2027

Scotland	v	Germany
	Report

15 June 2027

Germany	v	Sweden
	Report

15 June 2027

Netherlands	v	Scotland
	Report

== Qualified teams for the 2028 Summer Olympics ==
The following four teams will qualify for the 2028 Summer Olympics in Los Angeles, United States.

Team	Qualified on	Previous appearances in Summer Olympics
Group A1 winner	2027	
Group A2 winner	2027	
Group A3 winner	2027	
Group A4 winner	2027	
