= Giulia Domenichetti =

Italian footballer and futsal player

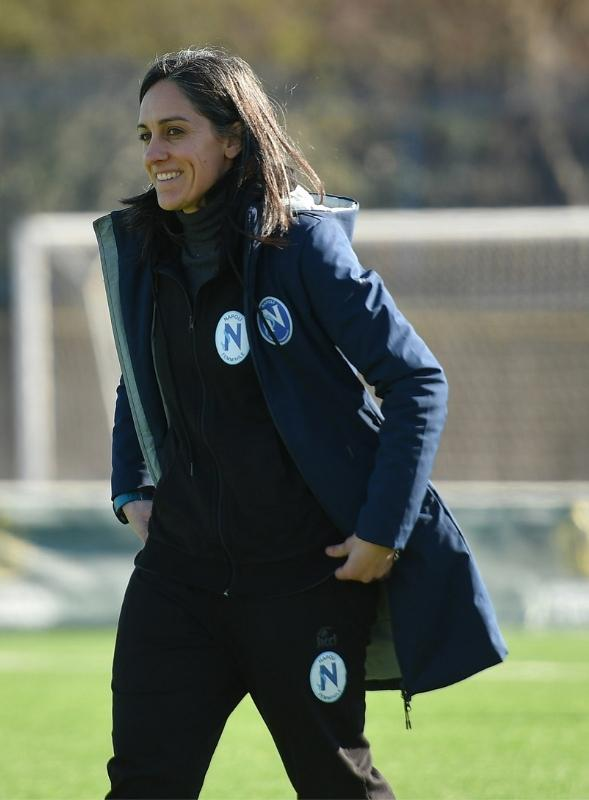
- Giulia Domenichetti as manager of SSD Napoli Femminile in 2021-22 season

Personal information
- Full name: Giulia Domenichetti
- Date of birth: 29 April 1984 (age 42)
- Place of birth: Ancona, Italy
- Height: 1.65 m (5 ft 5 in)
- Position: Midfielder

Team information
- Current team: San Marino (head coach)

Youth career
- ACF Ancosped Ancona

Senior career*
Years	Team	Apps	(Gls)
1999–2003	Vigor Senigallia	67	(17)
2003–2011	Torres CF	156	(29)
2011–2012	Chiasiellis	26	(4)
2012–2015	Torres CF	77	(16)
2018–2019	C.F. Florentia	7	(0)

International career^{‡}
2005–2014	Italy	90	(4)

Managerial career
- 2020–2021: Florentia S.G. (vice)
- 2021–2022: Napoli
- 2022–2023: San Marino Academy
- 2026–: San Marino
- * Club domestic league appearances and goals as of 20 November 2018 (UTC) ‡ National team caps and goals as of 12:00, 4 June 2018 (UTC)

Giulia Domenichetti (born 29 April 1984) is an Italian former football midfielder and former futsal player and coach, both in the highest leagues in Italy. Before ending a three-year spell out of football in 2018, she mainly played for Sassari Torres in Italy's Serie A. She was a member of the Italian national team for nearly a decade, taking part in three European Championships.

== Career ==
Aside from eleven seasons with Torres, where she won three Serie A winner's medals, she also played in Serie A with Calcio Chiasiellis A midfielder, Domenichetti was a longstanding member of the Italy women's national football team with 90 caps. She was a part of Italy's 2005, 2009 and 2013 UEFA Women's Championship campaigns.

Coinciding with Torres' exclusion from Serie A for financial reasons, in 2015 she left association football for futsal. She signed with Città di Montesilvano, a Serie A Elite club based in Montesilvano, Italy. The club won the championship in 2015-2016 the season.

Torres played one more season in Serie A football, signing with Florentia San Gimignano S.S.D. for the 2018–19 season.

== International career ==
Domenichetti made her senior debut for Italy on 13 April 2005, in a 1–0 home friendly win over Denmark. Included in the squad for UEFA Women's Euro 2005 in North West England, she played in all three games as Italy made a group stage exit.

At UEFA Women's Euro 2009 in Finland, Domenichetti played in all four games as the Italians reached the quarter-finals. Four years later, national coach Antonio Cabrini named Domenichetti in his selection for UEFA Women's Euro 2013 in Sweden.

Goals for the Italian WNT in official competitions
Competition	Stage	Date	Location	Opponent	Goals	Result	Overall
2011 FIFA World Cup	Qualifiers	2010–06–19	Montereale	Slovenia	1	6–0	2
2011 FIFA World Cup	Qualifiers	2010–09–15	Gubbio	France	1	2–3	2
2013 UEFA Euro	Qualifiers	2011–11–23	Trani	Greece	1	2–0	1
2015 FIFA World Cup	Qualifiers	2014–02–13	Novara	Czech Republic	1	6–1	1

== Record ==
=== Club ===
Torres Calcio

- Serie A (3): 2009–10, 2010–11, 2012–13
- Coppa Italia (4): 2003–04, 2004–05, 2007–08, 2010–11
- Supercoppa Italiana (4): 2008–09, 2009–10, 2010–11, 2012–13

Best performance in other competitions

- UEFA Champions League (Quarterfinals): 2004–05, 2009–10, 2012–13, 2013–14

=== National team ===
Best performance

- UEFA Euro (quarterfinals): 2009, 2013
