= 2027 UEFA Women's Nations League =

Tournament details
- Dates: League phase: 23 February – 15 June; Promotion/relegation matches: 4–12 October; Nations League Finals: 4 October – 4 December
- Teams: 54

Tournament statistics
- Matches played: 0
- Women's European Qualifiers Women's Nations League

The 2027 UEFA Women's Nations League will be the third season of the UEFA Women's Nations League, an international women's football competition contested by the senior women's national teams of the member associations of UEFA. The league phase of the competition will be played between February and June 2027, with the finals tournament taking place between October and December 2027. The results also determine the leagues for the UEFA Women's Euro 2029 qualifying competition and which four teams qualify for the 2028 Summer Olympics in Los Angeles.

Spain are the two-time defending champions.

== Format ==
The competition will begin with the league stage, featuring the national teams split into three leagues (A, B, and C) based on the overall league rankings at the conclusion of the 2027 FIFA Women's World Cup qualifying league phase. Leagues A and B will feature 16 teams in four groups of four teams, while League C will consist of the remaining competition entrants split into groups of three or four teams. The teams in each group played against each other home-and-away in a round-robin format.

The four group winners of League A advanced to the Nations League Finals, consisting of two semi-finals, a third place play-off, and a final, all played over two legs. An open draw will determine the pairings and order of legs for the semi-final matches, as well as which semi-final pairing will have its teams host the first leg of the third-place play-off and final.

In addition, the competition will feature promotion and relegation, taking effect in UEFA Women's Euro 2029 qualifying (which uses an identical league structure). The group winners of Leagues B and C will be automatically promoted, while the fourth-placed teams in Leagues A and B, as well as the two lowest-ranked third-placed teams in League B, will be automatically relegated. Promotion/relegation play-offs will also be held on a home-and-away basis, taking place in parallel with the Nations League semi-finals, to determine which of the other teams will be promoted, relegated or remain in their respective leagues. The third-placed teams of League A play the runners-up of League B, while the two best-ranked third-placed teams in League B play the two best-ranked League C runners-up. The teams from the higher leagues will be seeded, and play the second leg at home.

In all two-legged ties, the team that scores more goals on aggregate is the winner. If the aggregate score is level, extra time would be played (the away goals rule does not apply). If the score remains level after extra time, a penalty shoot-out will be used to decide the winner.

== Tiebreakers ==
During the league phase, teams will be ranked according to points (3 points for a win, 1 point for a draw, 0 points for a loss) with these tiebreaking criteria applied to teams tied on points (Regulations Article 15):

1. higher number of points obtained in matches among the tied teams;
2. greater goal difference obtained in matches among the tied teams;
3. greater number of goals scored in matches among the tied teams;
4. if teams remain tied, then criteria a–c are reapplied only to those teams that remain tied;

If teams still remain tied, then the following criteria are applied only to those teams that remain tied:

5. greater goal difference in all league phase matches;
6. greater number of goals scored in all league phase matches;
7. greater number of away goals scored in all league phase matches;
8. greater number of wins in all league phase matches;
9. greater number of away wins in all league phase matches;
10. lower total of disciplinary points obtained by players and team officials in all league phase matches:
  1. Yellow card: 1 point;
  2. Second yellow card/indirect red card: 3 points;
  3. Direct red card: 3 points;
11. higher position in the 2026 UEFA Women's European Qualifiers overall rankings

== Schedule ==
The draw and match schedule is below.

Stage	Round	Dates
League phase	Draw	3 November 2026
League phase	Matchday 1	23 February – 6 March 2027
League phase	Matchday 2	23 February – 6 March 2027
League phase	Matchday 3	13–24 April 2027
League phase	Matchday 4	13–24 April 2027
League phase	Matchday 5	7–15 June 2027
League phase	Matchday 6	7–15 June 2027
Promotion/relegation matches	Draw	18 June 2027
Promotion/relegation matches	First leg	4–12 October 2027
Promotion/relegation matches	Second leg	4–12 October 2027
Finals	Draw	18 June 2027
Finals	Semi-finals (two legs)	4–12 October 2027
Finals	Third-place playoff (two legs)	23 November – 4 December 2027
Finals	Final (two legs)	23 November – 4 December 2027

== Seeding ==
The leagues were formed according to the 2027 FIFA Women's World Cup qualifying overall league rankings and were seeded into pots based on the same rankings.

San Marino entered the tournament for the first time.

Key
▲	Promoted after 2027 FIFA Women's World Cup qualifying
▼	Relegated after 2027 FIFA Women's World Cup qualifying

League A
Pot	Team	Prv	Rank
1	Germany		1
1	Spain		2
1	Denmark		3
1	France		4
2	England		5
2	Norway		6
2	Netherlands		7
2	Italy		8
3	Republic of Ireland		9
3	Sweden		10
3	Iceland		11
3	Austria		12
4	Switzerland	▲	13
4	Portugal	▲	14
4	Scotland	▲	15
4	Wales	▲	16

League B
Pot	Team	Prv	Rank
1	Slovenia	▼	17
1	Poland	▼	18
1	Serbia	▼	19
1	Ukraine	▼	20
2	Finland		21
2	Belgium		22
2	Turkey		23
2	Czech Republic		24
3	Albania		25
3	Northern Ireland		26
3	Hungary	▲	27
3	Greece	▲	28
4	Romania	▲	29
4	Belarus	▲	30
4	Kosovo	▲	31
4	Lithuania	▲	32

League C
Pot	Team	Prv	Rank
1	Slovakia	▼	33
1	Israel	▼	34
1	Montenegro	▼	35
1	Latvia	▼	36
1	Malta	▼	37
1	Luxembourg	▼	38
2	Croatia		39
2	Kazakhstan		40
2	Azerbaijan		41
2	Faroe Islands		42
2	Moldova		43
2	Bosnia and Herzegovina		44
3	Estonia		45
3	Cyprus		46
3	Armenia		47
3	Georgia		48
3	Bulgaria		49
3	North Macedonia		50
4	Andorra		51
4	Liechtenstein		52
4	Gibraltar		53
4	San Marino		54

Banned from entering the competition
Team
Russia

== Draw ==
The draw took place on 3 November 2026 at 13:00 CET in Nyon, Switzerland.

The following draw conditions were announced:

- For political reasons, Armenia and Azerbaijan, Serbia and Kosovo, as well as Belarus and Ukraine, could not be drawn in the same group.
- To avoid conflict of interest, Scotland and Wales (Pot A4) could not be drawn into the same group as England (Pot A2) because they unite as Great Britain for the Olympics.
- Due to excessive travel restrictions, Kazakhstan could not be drawn into a group containing more than one of Andorra, Gibraltar or Malta.
- Due to winter venue restrictions, a maximum of two of Latvia (Pot C1), Faroe Islands (Pot C2) and Estonia (Pot C3) could be drawn into the same group.

The draw proceeded as follows:

- League C: Teams from Pot 1 were drawn into Groups C1 through C6, in order. The same procedure occurred with Pots 2 and 3, unless a draw condition applied. Pot 4 teams were then drawn to Groups C1 through C4, unless a draw condition applied.
- League B: Teams from Pots 1 through 4 were drawn into Groups B1 through B4, in order, unless a draw condition applied.
- League A: Teams from Pots 1 through 4 were drawn into Groups A1 through A4, in order, unless a draw condition applied.

== League A ==
=== Group A1 ===
Pos	Team	Pld	W	D	L	GF	GA	GD	Pts	Promotion, qualification or relegation	(Spain)	(Norway)	(Republic of Ireland)	(Switzerland)
1	Spain	0	0	0	0	0	0	0	0	Qualification to 2028 Summer Olympics and Nations League Finals	—	2 Mar	20 Apr	15 Jun
2	Norway	0	0	0	0	0	0	0	0		24 Apr	—	15 Jun	20 Apr
3	Republic of Ireland	0	0	0	0	0	0	0	0	Qualification for relegation play-offs	11 Jun	2 Mar	—	6 Mar
4	Switzerland	0	0	0	0	0	0	0	0	Relegation to League B	6 Mar	11 Jun	24 Apr	—

First match(es) will be played: 2 March 2027. Source: UEFA

=== Group A2 ===
Pos	Team	Pld	W	D	L	GF	GA	GD	Pts	Promotion, qualification or relegation	(France)	(England)	(Austria)	(Portugal)
1	France	0	0	0	0	0	0	0	0	Qualification to 2028 Summer Olympics and Nations League Finals	—	11 Jun	2 Mar	23 Apr
2	England	0	0	0	0	0	0	0	0		6 Mar	—	18 Apr	15 Jun
3	Austria	0	0	0	0	0	0	0	0	Qualification for relegation play-offs	15 Jun	23 Apr	—	6 Mar
4	Portugal	0	0	0	0	0	0	0	0	Relegation to League B	19 Apr	2 Mar	11 Jun	—

First match(es) will be played: 2 March 2027. Source: UEFA

=== Group A3 ===
Pos	Team	Pld	W	D	L	GF	GA	GD	Pts	Promotion, qualification or relegation	(Denmark)	(Italy)	(Iceland)	(Wales)
1	Denmark	0	0	0	0	0	0	0	0	Qualification to 2028 Summer Olympics and Nations League Finals	—	2 Mar	11 Jun	24 Apr
2	Italy	0	0	0	0	0	0	0	0		15 Jun	—	6 Mar	20 Apr
3	Iceland	0	0	0	0	0	0	0	0	Qualification for relegation play-offs	20 Apr	24 Apr	—	15 Jun
4	Wales	0	0	0	0	0	0	0	0	Relegation to League B	6 Mar	11 Jun	2 Mar	—

First match(es) will be played: 2 March 2027. Source: UEFA

=== Group A4 ===
Pos	Team	Pld	W	D	L	GF	GA	GD	Pts	Promotion, qualification or relegation	(Germany)	(Netherlands)	(Sweden)	(Scotland)
1	Germany	0	0	0	0	0	0	0	0	Qualification to 2028 Summer Olympics and Nations League Finals	—	20 Apr	15 Jun	6 Mar
2	Netherlands	0	0	0	0	0	0	0	0		24 Apr	—	6 Mar	15 Jun
3	Sweden	0	0	0	0	0	0	0	0	Qualification for relegation play-offs	2 Mar	11 Jun	—	20 Apr
4	Scotland	0	0	0	0	0	0	0	0	Relegation to League B	11 Jun	2 Mar	24 Apr	—

First match(es) will be played: 2 March 2027. Source: UEFA

== League B ==
=== Group B1 ===
Pos	Team	Pld	W	D	L	GF	GA	GD	Pts	Promotion, qualification or relegation	(Serbia)	(Belgium)	(Albania)	(Romania)
1	Serbia	0	0	0	0	0	0	0	0	Promoted to League A	—	2 Mar	20 Apr	24 Apr
2	Belgium	0	0	0	0	0	0	0	0	Qualification for promotion play-offs	15 Jun	—	11 Jun	10 Apr
3	Albania	0	0	0	0	0	0	0	0	Qualification for relegation play-offs	6 Mar	24 Apr	—	2 Mar
4	Romania	0	0	0	0	0	0	0	0	Relegation to League C	11 Jun	6 Mar	15 Jun	—

First match(es) will be played: 2 March 2027. Source: UEFA

=== Group B2 ===
Pos	Team	Pld	W	D	L	GF	GA	GD	Pts	Promotion, qualification or relegation	(Ukraine)	(Czech Republic)	(Greece)	(Lithuania)
1	Ukraine	0	0	0	0	0	0	0	0	Promoted to League A	—	11 Jun	15 Jun	2 Mar
2	Czech Republic	0	0	0	0	0	0	0	0	Qualification for promotion play-offs	6 Mar	—	24 Apr	20 Apr
3	Greece	0	0	0	0	0	0	0	0	Qualification for relegation play-offs	20 Apr	2 Mar	—	6 Mar
4	Lithuania	0	0	0	0	0	0	0	0	Relegation to League C	24 Apr	15 Jun	11 Jun	—

First match(es) will be played: 2 March 2027. Source: UEFA

=== Group B3 ===
Pos	Team	Pld	W	D	L	GF	GA	GD	Pts	Promotion, qualification or relegation	(Poland)	(Finland)	(Northern Ireland)	(Belarus)
1	Poland	0	0	0	0	0	0	0	0	Promoted to League A	—	6 Mar	15 Jun	20 Apr
2	Finland	0	0	0	0	0	0	0	0	Qualification for promotion play-offs	24 Apr	—	20 Apr	15 Jun
3	Northern Ireland	0	0	0	0	0	0	0	0	Qualification for relegation play-offs	2 Mar	11 Jun	—	6 Mar
4	Belarus	0	0	0	0	0	0	0	0	Relegation to League C	11 Jun	2 Mar	24 Apr	—

First match(es) will be played: 2 March 2027. Source: UEFA

=== Group B4 ===
Pos	Team	Pld	W	D	L	GF	GA	GD	Pts	Promotion, qualification or relegation	(Slovenia)	(Turkey)	(Hungary)	(Kosovo)
1	Slovenia	0	0	0	0	0	0	0	0	Promoted to League A	—	2 Mar	15 Jun	24 Apr
2	Turkey	0	0	0	0	0	0	0	0	Qualification for promotion play-offs	11 Jun	—	20 Apr	6 Mar
3	Hungary	0	0	0	0	0	0	0	0	Qualification for relegation play-offs	6 Mar	24 Apr	—	2 Mar
4	Kosovo	0	0	0	0	0	0	0	0	Relegation to League C	20 Apr	15 Jun	11 Jun	—

First match(es) will be played: 2 March 2027. Source: UEFA

== League C ==
=== Group C1 ===
Pos	Team	Pld	W	D	L	GF	GA	GD	Pts	Promotion or qualification	(Slovakia)	(Croatia)	(Bulgaria)	(Gibraltar)
1	Slovakia	0	0	0	0	0	0	0	0	Promotion to League B	—	2 Mar	15 Jun	20 Apr
2	Croatia	0	0	0	0	0	0	0	0	Possible qualification for promotion play-offs	11 Jun	—	24 Apr	6 Mar
3	Bulgaria	0	0	0	0	0	0	0	0		6 Mar	20 Apr	—	11 Jun
4	Gibraltar	0	0	0	0	0	0	0	0		24 Apr	15 Jun	2 Mar	—

First match(es) will be played: 2 March 2027. Source: UEFA

=== Group C2 ===
Pos	Team	Pld	W	D	L	GF	GA	GD	Pts	Promotion or qualification	(Latvia)	(Azerbaijan)	(Georgia (country))	(Liechtenstein)
1	Latvia	0	0	0	0	0	0	0	0	Promotion to League B	—	20 Apr	15 Jun	24 Apr
2	Azerbaijan	0	0	0	0	0	0	0	0	Possible qualification for promotion play-offs	11 Jun	—	24 Apr	2 Mar
3	Georgia	0	0	0	0	0	0	0	0		2 Mar	6 Mar	—	11 Jun
4	Liechtenstein	0	0	0	0	0	0	0	0		6 Mar	15 Jun	20 Apr	—

First match(es) will be played: 2 March 2027. Source: UEFA

=== Group C3 ===
Pos	Team	Pld	W	D	L	GF	GA	GD	Pts	Promotion or qualification	(Israel)	(Faroe Islands)	(North Macedonia)	(Andorra)
1	Israel	0	0	0	0	0	0	0	0	Promotion to League B	—	–	–	–
2	Faroe Islands	0	0	0	0	0	0	0	0	Possible qualification for promotion play-offs	–	—	–	–
3	North Macedonia	0	0	0	0	0	0	0	0		–	–	—	–
4	Andorra	0	0	0	0	0	0	0	0		–	–	–	—

First match(es) will be played: 2 March 2027. Source: UEFA

=== Group C4 ===
Pos	Team	Pld	W	D	L	GF	GA	GD	Pts	Promotion or qualification	(Luxembourg)	(Bosnia and Herzegovina)	(Estonia)	(San Marino)
1	Luxembourg	0	0	0	0	0	0	0	0	Promotion to League B	—	2 Mar	20 Apr	11 Jun
2	Bosnia and Herzegovina	0	0	0	0	0	0	0	0	Possible qualification for promotion play-offs	24 Apr	—	6 Mar	20 Apr
3	Estonia	0	0	0	0	0	0	0	0		15 Jun	11 Jun	—	24 Apr
4	San Marino	0	0	0	0	0	0	0	0		6 Mar	15 Jun	2 Mar	—

First match(es) will be played: 2 March 2027. Source: UEFA

=== Group C5 ===
Pos	Team	Pld	W	D	L	GF	GA	GD	Pts	Promotion or qualification	(Malta)	(Moldova)	(Cyprus)
1	Malta	0	0	0	0	0	0	0	0	Promotion to League B	—	15 Jun	24 Apr
2	Moldova	0	0	0	0	0	0	0	0	Possible qualification for promotion play-offs	20 Apr	—	11 Jun
3	Cyprus	0	0	0	0	0	0	0	0		6 Mar	2 Mar	—

First match(es) will be played: 2 March 2027. Source: UEFA

=== Group C6 ===
Pos	Team	Pld	W	D	L	GF	GA	GD	Pts	Promotion or qualification	(Montenegro)	(Kazakhstan)	(Armenia)
1	Montenegro	0	0	0	0	0	0	0	0	Promotion to League B	—	–	–
2	Kazakhstan	0	0	0	0	0	0	0	0	Possible qualification for promotion play-offs	–	—	–
3	Armenia	0	0	0	0	0	0	0	0		–	–	—

First match(es) will be played: 2 March 2027. Source: UEFA

== Qualified teams for the 2028 Summer Olympics ==
The following four teams will qualify for the 2028 Summer Olympic women's football tournament in Los Angeles, United States.

Team	Qualified on	Previous appearances in Summer Olympics
Group A1 winner	2027	
Group A2 winner	2027	
Group A3 winner	2027	
Group A4 winner	2027	
