= Football at the 2028 Summer Olympics =

Football at the Games of the XXXIV Olympiad
- Pictograms of Olympic sports – Football

Event details
- Games: 2028 Summer Olympics
- Host country: United States
- Dates: July 10–29
- Venues: 7 (in 7 host cities)
- Competitors: 504

Men's tournament
- Teams: 12 (from 6 confederations)

Women's tournament
- Teams: 16 (from 6 confederations)

Editions
- ← 2024 2032 →

The soccer (association football) tournaments at the 2028 Summer Olympics will be held in Los Angeles and six other cities in the United States from July 10 to 29, 2028.

Two different tournaments will be held in this sport: men's and women's. Spain is the men's defending champion, and the United States is the women's defending champion.

== Competition schedule ==
The preliminary match schedule was released on November 12, 2025. All semifinal, bronze medal, and gold medal matches will be contested at the Rose Bowl Stadium. A detailed schedule was released on March 16, 2026 with the start of the men's tournament set for July 10, four days before the opening ceremony.

Legend
| G | Group stage | ¼ | Quarter-finals | ½ | Semi-finals | B | Bronze medal match | F | Gold medal match |

| Date Event | Mon 10 | Tue 11 | Wed 12 | Thu 13 | Fri 14 | Sat 15 | Sun 16 | Mon 17 | Tue 18 | Wed 19 | Thu 20 | Fri 21 | Sat 22 | Sun 23 | Mon 24 | Tue 25 | Wed 26 | Thu 27 | Fri 28 | Sat 29 |
|---|---|---|---|---|---|---|---|---|---|---|---|---|---|---|---|---|---|---|---|---|
| Men | G | | | G | | | G | | | | ¼ | | | | ½ | | | B | F | |
| Women | | G | | | G | | | G | | | | ¼ | | | | ½ | | | B | F |

== Venues ==
The match schedule was announced in March 2026 and will allow teams to advance from east to west as the tournament progresses, in order to minimize travel demands. Seven venues across seven cities will serve as hosts, with all but the Rose Bowl Stadium in Pasadena and Snapdragon Stadium in San Diego being soccer-specific stadiums.

| | Pasadena | San Diego | Nashville |
|---|---|---|---|
| | Rose Bowl Stadium | Snapdragon Stadium (San Diego Stadium) | Geodis Park (Nashville Stadium) |
| | Capacity: 89,702 | Capacity: 35,000 | Capacity: 30,109 |
Location of the host cities of football tournaments at the 2028 Summer Olympics.
| New York | St. Louis | Columbus | San Jose |
| Etihad Park (New York Stadium) | Energizer Park (St. Louis Stadium) | ScottsMiracle-Gro Field (Columbus Stadium) | PayPal Park (San José Stadium) |
| Capacity: 25,000 | Capacity: 22,423 | Capacity: 20,371 | Capacity: 18,000 |

== Qualification ==
In April 2025, the IOC Executive Board approved a recommendation for 12 men's teams and 16 women's teams. The FIFA Council approved the distribution of spots at their meeting on 17 December 2025; however, CONMEBOL had previously published its own qualification system for its confederation's women's football qualification.

=== Qualification summary ===
| Nation | Men's | Women's | Athletes |
|---|---|---|---|
| Brazil | | Yes | 18 |
| Colombia | | Yes | 18 |
| Mexico | Yes | | 18 |
| United States | Yes | Yes | 36 |
| Total: 4 NOCs | 2/12 | 3/16 | 90/504 |

=== Men's qualification ===
| Means of qualification | Dates (Note: Dates and venues are those of final tournaments (or final round of qualification tournaments); various qualification stages may precede these matches.) | Venue(s) | Berth(s) | Qualified |
|---|---|---|---|---|
| Host nation | —N/a | —N/a | 1 | United States |
| 2028 AFC U-23 Asian Cup | 4–22 January 2028 | Japan | 2 | |
| 2027 U-23 Africa Cup of Nations | 19 November – 4 December 2027 | Egypt | 2 | |
| 2026 CONCACAF U-20 Championship | 25 July – 9 August 2026 | Mexico | 1 | Mexico |
| CONMEBOL Olympic qualifying tournament | TBD | TBD | 2 | |
| OFC Olympic qualifying tournament | TBD | TBD | 1 | |
| 2027 UEFA European Under-21 Championship | 17 June – 4 July 2027 | Albania; Serbia | 3 | |
| Total | | | 12 | |

=== Women's qualification ===
| Means of qualification | Dates | Venue(s) | Berth(s) | Qualified |
|---|---|---|---|---|
| Host nation | —N/a | —N/a | 1 | United States |
| 2028 AFC Women's Olympic Qualifying Tournament | 19 April 2027 – 4 March 2028 | Multiple | 2 | |
| 2028 CAF Women's Olympic qualifying tournament | 4 June 2026 – 4 December 2027 | Multiple | 2 | |
| 2026 CONCACAF W Championship | 27 November – 5 December 2026 | United States | 3 | |
| 2025 Copa América Femenina | 11 July – 2 August 2025 | Ecuador | 2 | Brazil; Colombia |
| 2028 OFC Olympic Qualifying Tournament | TBD | TBD | 1 | |
| 2027 UEFA Women's Nations League | 25 February – 15 June 2027 | Multiple | 4 | |
| AFC–CONMEBOL play-off | 2028 | TBD | 1 | |
| Total | | | 16 | |
