= UEFA Women's Euro 2029 =

2029 edition of the UEFA Women's Football European Championship

Fußball-Europameisterschaft der Frauen 2029

Tournament details
- Host country: Germany
- Dates: 2029
- Teams: 16 (from 1 confederation)
- Venues: 8 (in 8 host cities)

The 2029 UEFA Women's Championship, commonly referred to as UEFA Women's Euro 2029 or simply Euro 2029 or Women's Euro 2029, will be the 15th edition of the UEFA Women's Championship, the quadrennial international football championship organised by UEFA for the women's national teams of Europe. The tournament will be played in 2029 in Germany.

Germany has previously hosted the men's 1974 FIFA World Cup, the men's UEFA Euro 1988, the 1989 European Competition for Women's Football, the UEFA Women's Euro 2001, the men's 2006 FIFA World Cup, the 2011 FIFA Women's World Cup and the men's UEFA Euro 2024. It also included the pan-European men's UEFA Euro 2020, where Germany was one of the host nations. It will be the fourth edition since it was expanded to 16 teams.

England are the two-time defending champions, winning the titles back to back in 2022 and 2025.

== Host selection ==
UEFA confirmed the bidding process on 23 July 2024. The timeline is as follows:

| Date | Notes |
|---|---|
| 24 September 2024 | Deadline for UEFA member associations to confirm their interest in bidding |
| 1 October 2024 | Bid requirements published to all interested bidders |
| 12 March 2025 | Submission of the Preliminary Bid Dossier |
| 28 August 2025 | Submission of the final Bid Dossier |
| 3 December 2025 | Appointment of host(s) of UEFA Women's Euro 2029 |

Germany were announced as hosts on 3 December 2025.

| Country(s) | Votes |
|---|---|
| Germany | 15 |
| Denmark, Sweden | 2 |
| Poland | 0 |
| Total | 17 |

=== Confirmed bidders ===
Four bids were submitted by the deadline of 28 August 2025 to host the tournament.

- Denmark and Sweden
- Poland
- Germany

All five bids submitted their preliminary bid dossier by 12 March 2025 and submitted their final bid dossier by 28 August 2025, after which the final list of candidates will be known ahead of the host(s) announcement on 3 December 2025. Italy withdrew prior to the final bid dossier deadline. Portugal withdrew its bid on 20 November 2025 to focus on co-hosting the 2030 FIFA World Cup along with Morocco and Spain.

== Venues ==
Locations of the host cities of the UEFA Women's Euro 2029 in Germany

The tournament is planned to be held in eight host cities across Germany: three in North Rhine-Westphalia (Cologne, Dortmund, and Düsseldorf), two in Lower Saxony (Hanover and Wolfsburg) and one each in Bavaria (Munich), Hesse (Frankfurt), and Saxony (Leipzig). Frankfurt and Wolfsburg previously hosted the 2011 FIFA Women's World Cup, while all but the Lower Saxony cities hosted the men's UEFA Euro 2024, and all but Wolfsburg hosted the 2006 FIFA World Cup.

Allianz Arena in Munich, the largest venue of the tournament, is planned to host the final, while the Westfalenstadion in Dortmund is planned to host the opening game. Seven of the eight venues have a capacity above 40,000 – Wolfsburg's 26,000-capacity Volkswagen Arena is the smallest venue in the tournament.

The following 8 host cities and stadiums were selected for Germany's bid:

| Munich | Dortmund | Frankfurt | Düsseldorf |
|---|---|---|---|
| Allianz Arena (Munich Football Arena) | Westfalenstadion (BVB Stadion Dortmund) | Waldstadion (Frankfurt Arena) | Merkur Spiel-Arena (Düsseldorf Arena) |
| Capacity: 66,000 | Capacity: 62,000 | Capacity: 47,000 | Capacity: 47,000 |
| Hanover | Cologne | Leipzig | Wolfsburg |
| Niedersachsenstadion (Hanover Stadium) | RheinEnergieStadion (Cologne Stadium) | Red Bull Arena (Leipzig Stadium) | Volkswagen Arena (VfL Wolfsburg Arena) |
| Capacity: 46,044 | Capacity: 43,000 | Capacity: 41,193 | Capacity: 26,146 |

== Qualification ==
=== Qualified teams ===
The following teams qualified for the final tournament alongside host Germany.

| Team | Qualified as | Date of qualification | App | First | Last | Streak | Best performance (Note: Bold text indicates they hosted that edition.) | WR |
|---|---|---|---|---|---|---|---|---|
| Germany | Hosts | 3 December 2025 | 13th | 1989 | 2025 | 13 | Champions (1989, 1991, 1995, 1997, 2001, 2005, 2009, 2013) | |

== Marketing ==
=== Sponsorship ===
UEFA Women's Football global sponsors
- Adidas
- Amazon
- Booking.com
- Carlsberg
- Euronics
- Lidl
- Lenovo (Motorola)
- PepsiCo (Walkers)
- Vodafone

== See also ==
- 1989 European Competition for Women's Football
- UEFA Women's Euro 2001
- 2011 FIFA Women's World Cup
