= Player-coach =

Condition where a team player is also coach

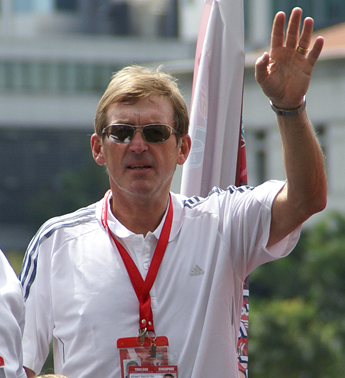
After the Heysel Stadium disaster in 1985 and Joe Fagan's subsequent resignation as manager, Kenny Dalglish served as the player-manager of Liverpool from 1985 to 1990.

A player-coach (also playing coach, captain-coach, or player-manager) is a member of a sports team who simultaneously holds both playing and coaching duties. Player-coaches may be head coaches or assistant coaches, and they may make changes to the squad and also play on the team.

Very few current major professional sports teams have head coaches who are also players, though it is common for senior players to take a role in managing more junior athletes. Historically, when professional sports had less money to pay players and coaches or managers, player-coaches were more common. Likewise, where player-coaches exist today, they are more common at, but not exclusive to, the lower levels where money is less available.

== Player-coaches in basketball ==
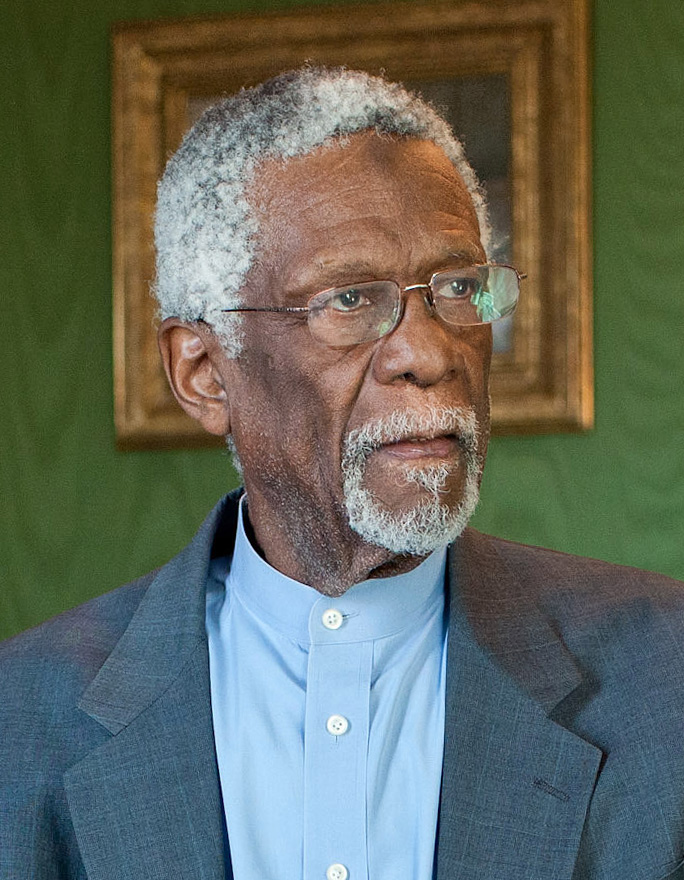
Bill Russell served as the player-coach of the Boston Celtics from 1966 to 1969, winning 2 NBA championships in that timespan.

The player-coach was, for many decades, a long-time fixture in professional basketball. Many notable coaches in the NBA served as player-coaches, including Bill Russell and Lenny Wilkens. This was especially true up through the 1970s, when the league was not as financially successful as it is today, and player-coaches were often used to save money. The practice fell out of favor in the 1980s (though Mike Dunleavy Sr., while an assistant coach with the Milwaukee Bucks, once came out of retirement and played several games when a rash of injuries decimated the team).Today, the collective bargaining agreement between the NBA and the players' union prohibits the use of player-coaches, in order to avoid circumventing the league's salary cap, as coaches' salaries are not counted under the cap. Therefore, if a player is to serve as a coach, he would have to receive commission from his contract as a player. The player, then, is not technically an official coach of his team but instead simply a coach in name. One example of a player in recent years who was groomed for eventual official coaching duties using this practice was Avery Johnson. The last player to serve as an official assistant coach was Tree Rollins for the Orlando Magic during the 1994–1995 season, and the last player to serve as head coach was Dave Cowens for the Boston Celtics during the 1978–1979 season.

== Player-coaches in American football ==
In the early days of professional American football, player-coaches were a necessity, as most leagues' rules prohibited coaching from the sidelines. The National Football League eventually allowed sideline coaches in the late 1920s, and they quickly became the norm. During the 1920s, legendary player-coaches in the NFL include Curly Lambeau, who played for the Green Bay Packers from 1919 to 1929 and served as their head coach from 1919 to 1949, and George Halas, who held similar roles for the Chicago Bears, a team for which he was also part-owner and business manager. Ernie Nevers held the positions of both fullback and head coach for the Duluth Eskimos in 1927 and the Chicago Cardinals from 1929 to 1931. Jimmy Conzelman was player-coach for four teams during the 1920s. In the mid-1950s, Tom Landry played defensive back while serving as defensive coordinator for the New York Giants. In the early 1970s, when Landry was coach of the Dallas Cowboys, he made running back Dan Reeves a player-coach.

In the television era, pro football evolved into a higher-impact two-platoon game, so players serving as head coaches became impractical.

More modern players have acted as player-assistant coaches in an unofficial capacity, such as journeyman quarterback Steve DeBerg, who served as an unofficial mentor for younger, more skilled arms while also serving as their backup.

In an official capacity, much like the NBA, the current CBA between the NFL and the NFL Players Association prohibits official player-coaches due to teams using it to circumvent the salary cap. This was evident in 2020 when the Denver Broncos were forced to start practice squad wide receiver Kendall Hinton at quarterback due to all of the Broncos regular quarterbacks being placed into COVID-19 protocols as a result of backup quarterback Jeff Driskel testing positive for COVID-19 and being around the remaining quarterbacks on the team without wearing face masks. Originally, the Broncos wanted to use offensive quality control coach Rob Calabrese to play quarterback, but the NFL turned them down out of hand. The Saints defeated the Broncos 31–3, with Hinton going 1 for 9 and two interceptions.

By the 21st century, on-field playcalling duties would often be split between the head coach or offensive coordinator and the quarterback. Peyton Manning, Brett Favre, Tom Brady, Ben Roethlisberger and Drew Brees pioneered what would essentially become roles as on-field offensive coordinators by taking vocal leadership in playcalling and game management.

== Player-coaches in cricket ==
Player-coaches in cricket are almost unheard of, although professional coaches are a relatively recent innovation and a similar role was generally filled by the team captain; this may still be the case in amateur competition. Internationally, Shane Deitz was appointed non-playing coach of Vanuatu in 2014 and, after meeting the necessary residency qualifications, made his international playing debut in 2018, at the age of 42. Similarly, former Australian international Ryan Campbell was appointed as a non-playing batting coach of Hong Kong in 2013, and after meeting the residency qualifications made his playing debut for Hong Kong in 2016, at the age of 44. David Houghton played as middle order batsman as well as head coach of Zimbabwe cricket team in the 1990s.

More recently the ICC full-member team of India had a spell in following the resignation of head coach Anil Kumble where the team played without a coach. In this instance, team captain Virat Kohli was given the nickname 'Koach' (Kohli + Coach) as he served as player-coach for the tour of the West Indies in 2017.

== Player-managers in association football ==
In association football, this situation usually arises when a manager leaves a team suddenly, and the chairman has to make a quick decision to appoint someone new as a caretaker manager. The chairman will usually either ask a coach to take temporary charge or turn to one of the club's most senior players. If this particular player gains good results for the team during his time in charge, he may be appointed full-time manager, which leaves him a player-manager. However, there are instances when a free agent is appointed by a new team as a manager and offers his playing abilities.

=== In British men's football ===
Notable football player-managers include: Kenny Dalglish (Liverpool), Graeme Souness (Rangers), Glenn Hoddle (Swindon Town and Chelsea), Bryan Robson (Middlesbrough), Peter Reid (Manchester City), Ruud Gullit (Chelsea), and Gianluca Vialli (Chelsea). Dalglish won a double of the league title and FA Cup in his first season as player-manager and continued to win two more league titles and an FA Cup before retiring from playing completely five years after becoming manager. Souness won three Scottish league titles and several cup competitions when he was player-manager of Rangers. He then succeeded Dalglish as Liverpool manager just before Rangers won another Scottish league title, but at the age of 38 he did not register himself as a player for Liverpool. In 1997, Ruud Gullit won the FA Cup with Chelsea in his first season as player-manager, also making history by being the first foreign and non-white manager to win a major trophy in English football. He was dismissed nine months later, and Chelsea appointed another player-manager (Gianluca Vialli) in his place. Within weeks of taking over, Vialli guided Chelsea to victory in the League Cup, and two months after that, they won the European Cup Winners' Cup.

A number of bigger clubs have appointed player-managers on a temporary basis but not given them permanent contracts. Notable cases include Ossie Ardiles (Tottenham Hotspur) in 1987 and Dave Watson (Everton) a decade later, although Ardiles later returned to Tottenham as manager in 1993 after managing three other clubs. During the first decade of the 21st century, however, the concept gradually fell into almost total disuse and was normally only practiced by smaller clubs. In March 2013, a BBC Sport article suggested that the concept of having a player-manager had gone out of fashion, with only two clubs in the English professional leagues using player-managers at that time.

There have been five player-managers in the Premier League since 2000:

- Stuart McCall, who managed two Bradford City games on an interim basis in late 2000;
- Garry Monk, who was appointed interim player-manager of Swansea City in February 2014, after their manager, Michael Laudrup, was dismissed;
- Leon Britton, who also became player-manager of Swansea City after the dismissal of Paul Clement;
- Ryan Giggs was appointed player-coach at Manchester United by David Moyes in July 2013, and Giggs served as interim player-manager following Moyes' dismissal in April 2014;
- Séamus Coleman was appointed interim manager (along with U18 manager Leighton Baines) after Sean Dyche was let go by Everton on January 9, 2025. They managed Everton's FA Cup win over Peterborough United on that day.

=== In English women's football ===
Chelsea L.F.C. defender Casey Stoney served a six-month spell as player-manager from January to June 2009 after the mid-season resignation of manager Steve Jones, and guided the club to a third-place finish in the 2008–09 FA Women's Premier League National Division.

=== In Slovak men's football ===
In Slovakia, comparably to surrounding countries, player-coaches and player-managers are most common in semi-professional or amateur clubs, with sides being led by formerly professional players on the brink of retirement or in early stages of their managerial careers. Frequently, such player-managers are linked with clubs from their native areas. Examples include Milan Jambor playing and managing FK Svit, Stanislav Šesták playing for and managing a club from his native village of Demjata or Peter Petráš's tenure in Tatran Prešov during their years in crisis in 3. Liga. In professional football (top two leagues) such cases are rarer but have occurred in the past, especially in smaller and financially struggling clubs, such as Senica, which has cooperated with Juraj Piroska simultaneously in a role of a players and assistant manager.

=== In other European football ===
In December 2015 and January 2016, Samuel Eto'o became interim player-manager of Antalyaspor.

In 2019, Vincent Kompany served as player-manager for RSC Anderlecht before retiring.

In September 2021, Ferencvárosi TC appointed forward Fanny Vágó as player-manager, who then led the team to two Női NB I championships in 2021–22 and 2022–23 while also continuing as the league's leading goalscorer in both seasons. When prompted to choose between managing her club and continuing to play for the Hungary women's national football team by its manager Margret Kratz, Vágó chose club management and ended her international career.

=== In Brazilian men's football ===
Brazilian world-cup winner Romário was also a player-coach for Vasco da Gama in 2007. He was appointed in November 2006 when Celso Roth was dismissed after a loss and debuted in a 1–0 win against Club América in the quarterfinals of the Copa Sudamericana. Despite the victory, Vasco was eliminated because of a 2–0 loss in the first leg. He continued as a coach until early February when he decided to go against Vasco's president Eurico Miranda forced him to use the then youth player Alan Kardec in a match for Campeonato Carioca. Romário left Vasco both as a coach and player.

=== In American women's football ===
In 2009, Sky Blue FC defender Christie Rampone took on her team's player-manager role after the resignation of Kelly Lindsey, herself the caretaker manager after the earlier resignation of Ian Sawyers. She led Sky Blue from the lowest seed in the 2009 Women's Professional Soccer Playoffs to the league's inaugural championship match, which Sky Blue won. Rampone later revealed that she was also more than two months' pregnant during her championship run as player-manager.

=== Challenges ===
The chief executive of the League Managers Association stated his belief that the increased workload for managers made combining the two roles difficult. The last permanent player-manager in the top flight of English football was Gianluca Vialli, who retired from playing in 1999 when he was the manager of Chelsea. The governing bodies have also imposed requirements for managers to hold professional coaching qualifications, which few players obtain before retiring.

== Player-managers in baseball ==
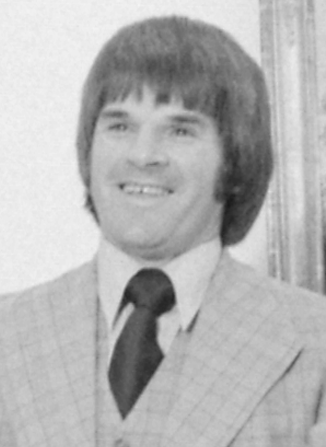
Pete Rose is the most recent player-manager in Major League Baseball

In baseball, the manager selects the lineup and starting pitcher before each game, and makes substitutions throughout the game. In early baseball history, it was not uncommon for players to serve as player-managers; that is, they managed the team while still being signed to play for the club. One reason for this is that by hiring a player as a manager, the team could save money by paying only one salary. Also, popular players were named player-managers in an effort to boost game attendance. The early history of player-managers in baseball is also responsible for the unique quirk in modern baseball of a team's non-playing staff wearing the same uniform as its players.

While no Major League Baseball (MLB) team has been led by a player-manager since 1986, they were once common. In 1934, five of the eight National League managers were also players. Notable players who spent time as player-managers include Cap Anson, Lou Boudreau, Fred Clarke, Ty Cobb, Mickey Cochrane, Frankie Frisch, Joe Cronin, Connie Mack, John McGraw, Frank Robinson, Tris Speaker, and Joe Torre, each of whom is an inductee of the National Baseball Hall of Fame. Clarke spent the longest time as a major league player-manager, serving as such for the Louisville Colonels from 1897 to 1899 and the Pittsburgh Pirates from 1900 to 1915. Robinson became the first African-American manager in MLB history, breaking another baseball color line, when he was named the Cleveland Indians' player-manager in 1975.

The most recent player-manager in MLB was Pete Rose, who, upon being traded from the Montreal Expos to the Cincinnati Reds in August 1984, was immediately named the Reds' manager. Rose managed and served as a backup infielder until the end of the 1986 season, when he retired as a player. Rose continued to manage the Reds until 1989, when he was given a lifetime ban by MLB for gambling on baseball.

During the 1999 minor league baseball season, Webster Garrison served as a player-coach for the Midland Rockhounds of the Texas League, (AA). Garrison played in 43 games while acting as the hitting coach for the team.

In their final game of the 2016 season, the Miami Marlins allowed Martin Prado to serve as player-manager. Prado started the game at third base and played for three innings before taking himself out of the game.

== Australian rules football ==
Captain-coaches used to be a relatively common occurrence in Australian rules football, even at the highest level of play; in fact, for the first nine years of the VFL (1897–1905), the premiership-winning team was coached by a player in every instance. However, the increasing professionalism and complications of the game late into the 20th century meant that the efficacy of captain-coaching was becoming increasingly unviable. The last captain-coach to win the premiership at the top level was Carlton's Alex Jesaulenko, who managed to secure a 5-point victory in the 1979 VFL Grand Final against Collingwood. Jesaulenko was also the final captain-coach in the VFL/AFL, serving as captain-coach until Round 8 on 16 May 1981. However, Malcolm Blight was a non-captaining player-coach at North Melbourne until Round 16 of the same season but was not captain during this time.

== Player-coaches in ice hockey ==
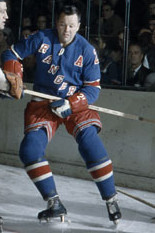
Doug Harvey was the last permanent player-coach in the NHL.

Doug Harvey has the distinction of being the NHL's last player to simultaneously hold the role of permanent head coach, i.e., not in an acting capacity. He held the dual roles with the New York Rangers during the 1961–62 season—a year in which he led the team to the semi-finals and was awarded his seventh Norris Trophy for best defenceman in the league. He again served as a player-coach for the Kansas City Blues of the Central Professional Hockey League in 1967.

Former Philadelphia Flyers team captain, Bobby Clarke, was appointed as a playing assistant coach in 1979 and served five years in the role. League rules required that he give up his role as team captain while coaching.

Bobby Hull served as a player-coach for the Winnipeg Jets of the now-defunct World Hockey Association from 1972 to 1974. Pat Stapleton served as a player-coach for the Chicago Cougars of the WHA from 1972 to 1974. Both Hull and Stapleton led their teams to the Avco Cup Final, with Hull doing so in 1973 and Stapleton doing so in 1974, which each lost. Harry Howell served as player-coach for the New York Golden Blades/Jersey Knights and San Diego Mariners for a season each.

Former NHL player, Charlie Burns, played for, and coached, the 1969–70 Minnesota North Stars when he was asked to fill in for coach Wren Blair, who had fallen ill. He had previously served as a player-coach for the 1965–66 and 1966–67 San Francisco Seals of the now-defunct Western Hockey League (1952–1974), leading the team to the semi-final round of the playoffs both years.

Hockey Hall of Fame builder, Harry Sinden, was a player-coach with the Kingston Frontenacs when he was named best defenseman in the Eastern Professional Hockey League (1959–1963) for the 1961–62 season. He again served as a player-coach when he led the Oklahoma City Blazers (1965–1977) to the Central Professional Hockey League championship in the 1965–66 CPHL season.

Hockey Hall of Famer, Cy Denneny, played for the 1929 Boston Bruins while coaching the team to its first Stanley Cup championship.

Esa Tikkanen, a five-time Stanley Cup winner as a player, played for, and coached, the Anyang Halla of the Asia League Ice Hockey during the 2004–05 season.

In 2014, Buffalo Sabres goalie coach, Artūrs Irbe, was enlisted mid-match to dress as an emergency back–up goaltender; however, he did not play.

== See also ==
- Ryder Cup captains
