= Maria Palama =

Greek footballer (born 2000)

Personal information
- Full name: Maria Palama
- Date of birth: 14 June 2000 (age 26)
- Place of birth: Korinos, Greece
- Position: Right-back

Team information
- Current team: Budapest Honvéd FC
- Number: 25

Senior career*
Years	Team	Apps	(Gls)
2013–2015	Pierides Mouses		
2015	Sepoliakos		
2015–2016	Odysseas Glyfadas		
2016–2017	Elpides Karditsas		
2017–2018	PAOK	22	(4)
2018–2020	Empoli	6	(0)
2020–2022	Diósgyőr	37	(6)
2022–2025	MTK	67	(10)
2025–	Budapest Honvéd	4	(0)

International career^{‡}
2016–2017	Greece U17	6	(1)
2017–2018	Greece U19	9	(0)
2021–	Greece	39	(0)
- * Club domestic league appearances and goals as of 25 May 2026 ‡ National team caps and goals as of 4 June 2025

Maria Palama (born 14 June 2000) is a Greek footballer currently playing as a defender for Budapest Honvéd in the Női NB I and the Greek national team.

== Club career ==
Pierides Mouses

Maria Palama started her career at second division club Pierides Mouses. In 2013, the club was relegated to the third division, where it remained for the next two seasons. She left in the summer of 2015 after 2.5 years.

Sepoliakos

At the age of 15, she moved to Athens to play for newly promoted A Division side Sepoliakos. After losing the first 7 games of the 2015–16 season, the club withdrew from the league. Palama decided to leave in December, only 6 months after she joined the team.

Odysseas Glyfadas

In the second half of the 2015–16 season, she joined fellow A Division side Glyfada. They finished 9th in the league, but due to a last-minute point deduction from Chania, they moved up to 7th place, thereby avoiding relegation.

Elpides Karditsas

In the summer of 2016, she signed for A Division runners-up Elpides Karditsas. After a season-long battle for top spot, Elpides finished second behind PAOK.

PAOK

In 2017, she joined 12-time league champions PAOK. In her first and only season, she made 22 appearances and scored 4 goals, helping the team win their 4th consecutive championship. In August 2017, she made her UEFA Women's Champions League debut in a qualifying round match against Sarajevo, when she came on as a substitute in the 81st minute for Elena Dimitrijević. PAOK qualified for the knockout phase, where Palama started both games as they lost 8–0 on aggregate to Sparta Praha.

Empoli

In the summer of 2018, she made her first move abroad, joining Italian club Empoli, who competed in Serie B. In her first season she only made 6 appearances as her team finished second in the league and won promotion for the 2019–20 Serie A. She picked up an ACL injury during international duty. She also made 15 appearances for the U19 team, including 3 in the 2019 Viareggio Cup, and scored 2 goals.

Diósgyőr

In 2020, she moved to Hungary and Női NB I side Diósgyőri VTK. During her 2 seasons at the club, she played 42 times and scored 6 goals. In the 2020–21 season, they finished 4th after losing to Astra Hungary in a match for 3rd place. In the 2021–22 season, they finished 5th and failed to qualify for the playoffs round. In the 2021 Hungarian Cup, they reached the semifinals where they lost to Astra Hungary.

MTK

In 2022, she joined Női NB I club MTK Hungária. In the 2022–23 season, she made 25 appearances and scored 4 goals. MTK finished 3rd in the league after beating Puskás Akadémia in the third-place match. In the 2023–24 season, she scored 4 goals in 28 total appearances as her club finished 3rd in the league and reached the final of the Hungarian Cup. She also competed in the 2024 NB I Indoor Football Cup, helping MTK reach the final where they lost on penalties to KÉSZ–St. Mihály. In the 2024–25 season, she scored 4 goals in 22 appearances, MTK finished 4th in the league and reached once again the Hungarian Cup final where they lost on penalties to ETO Győr for the second year in a row. On 29 April 2025, in a match against Soroksár SC, Palama came off in the 19th minute with an ACL injury.

Budapest Honvéd

In the summer of 2025, she signed for Budapest Honvéd. She made her debut on 5 April 2026 against Újpest after returning from a year-long injury. She made 4 appearances in the league and also was a starter in the Hungarian Cup final, in which Honvéd lost 3–0 to Ferencváros.

== International career ==
Maria Palama made her debut for the Greek U17 team on 6 October 2016 against Montenegro in the 2017 UEFA Women's Under-17 Championship qualification. She scored her first international goal in a 2–0 win over Malta. In total, she made 6 appearances and scored 1 goal for Greece U17.

She made her debut for the Greek U19 team on 12 September 2017 against Poland in the 2018 UEFA Women's Under-19 Championship qualification. She also played in the qualifying round of the 2019 edition. In total, she made 9 appearances for Greece U19.

She made her senior debut for Greece on 17 September 2021 against France in the 2023 FIFA Women's World Cup qualification. In total, she has represented Greece 39 times.

== Honours ==
Elpides Karditsas

- Greek A Division; runner-up: 2016–17

PAOK

- Greek A Division (1): 2017–18

Empoli

- Serie B; runner-up: 2018–19

MTK

- Hungarian Cup; runner-up: 2023–24, 2024–25

Budapest Honvéd

- Hungarian Cup; runner-up: 2025–26
