= Anna Csiki =

Hungarian footballer

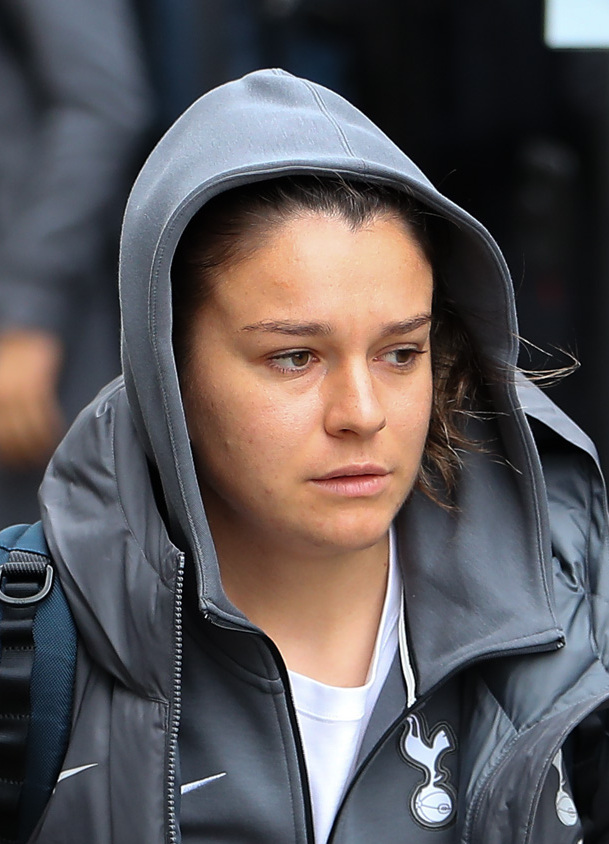
- Csiki with Tottenham Hotspur in 2024

Personal information
- Full name: Anna Júlia Csiki
- Date of birth: 14 November 1999 (age 26)
- Place of birth: Martonvásár, Hungary
- Height: 1.79 m (5 ft 10 in)
- Position: Central midfielder

Team information
- Current team: Benfica

Youth career
- 2012–2015: Ferencváros

Senior career*
Years	Team	Apps	(Gls)
2015–2019	Ferencváros	63	(14)
2020–2024	BK Häcken	66	(8)
2024–2026	Tottenham Hotspur	8	(0)
2025–2026	→ West Ham United (loan)	5	(1)
2026	→ Roma (loan)	8	(0)
2026–	Benfica	0	(0)

International career^{‡}
2014–2016	Hungary U17	17	(0)
2016–2018	Hungary U19	17	(9)
2017–	Hungary	54	(10)
- * Club domestic league appearances and goals as of 16:53, 29 June 2026 (UTC) ‡ National team caps and goals as of 06:52, 24 April 2026 (UTC)

Anna Júlia Csiki (Hungarian: [ˈɒnːɒ ˈjuːlijɒ ˈt͡ʃiki]; born 14 November 1999) is a Hungarian professional footballer who plays as a midfielder for Campeonato Nacional Feminino club Benfica and the Hungary national team.

== Early life ==
Csiki was born and raised in Martonvásár in central Hungary. She started playing football at the age of six, playing with Mustang SE, a club formed by parents of the players and coached by former Hungarian professional player Patkós Csaba. While at Mustang she played youth football with and against boys in Fejér County, including future Hungarian men's national team captain Dominik Szoboszlai. A multi-sport athlete as a child, Csiki was talented at tennis and played handball competitively, but ultimately decided to play football. She joined the academy of Ferencváros in 2012, playing in a girls academy full time.

== Club career ==
=== Ferencváros ===
Csiki started her professional career in Hungary with Ferencváros, also known as Fradi. She played first for FNLA Kóka which at the time acted as a second team for Fradi, playing in the Hungarian professional leagues with a roster of players under 17 years old.

Csiki debuted for the first team in February 2017 at the age of 16. She scored a brace in Fradi's 4–3 2019 Hungarian Cup victory over Diósgyőr, the team winning their fifth in a row. In total Csiki won three Hungarian Cups and two league titles in her time with the club. After spending a few years as part of the senior squad for the Budapest club, she moved on in June 2020 to Kopparbergs/Göteborg FC in Sweden.

=== BK Häcken ===
Her first season in Sweden saw her as part of the squad that won the club's first ever Damallsvenskan title in 2020. The club would win the Swedish Cup the following season. She remained with the team, which rebranded to BK Häcken FF in 2021, until 2024 when she signed a four-year contract with Tottenham Hotspur in England.

=== Tottenham Hotspur ===
Csiki reunited with her former BK Hacken coach Robert Vilahamn upon joining Spurs. She suffered a torn ACL in December 2022, which lasted until January 2024. She became the first Hungarian to ever play in the WSL when she made her debut for Spurs against Crystal Palace in September 2024.

On 4 September 2025, Csiki joined WSL club West Ham United on a season long loan deal. On 22 January 2026, she returned to Spurs from her loan spell at West Ham.

On 2 February 2026, Csiki joined Roma on loan until the end of the season, becoming the first Hungarian to play for the team.

=== Benfica ===
On 25 August 2026, Csiki joined Campeonato Nacional Feminino side Benfica on a two-year contract, with an option to extend for an additional year.

== International career ==
Csiki featured for the Under-16, Under-17, and Under-19 Hungarian national team sides.

She has been capped for the senior Hungary national team, making her debut on 14 September 2017 in a match against Scotland. She appeared for the senior national team during the UEFA Women's Euro 2021 qualifying cycle.

Csiki was awarded the inaugural women's Hungarian Ballon d'Or in January 2025, based on her play in 2024 for club and country.

== Personal life ==
Csiki's family are Székelys and trace their lineage to Transylvania. Growing up, her favorite club was FC Bayern Munich. Csiki has remained a fan of Ferencváros since departing the club's women's football team, watching the club's various sports teams such as men's football, ice hockey, and women's handball, among others.

== Career statistics ==
=== Club ===
As of match played 21 December 2025

Appearances and goals by club, season and competition
Club	Season	League			National cup (Note: Includes Hungarian Women's Cup, Svenska Cupen, Women's FA Cup)		League cup (Note: Includes Women's League Cup)		Continental		Others		Total	
Club	Season	Division	Apps	Goals	Apps	Goals	Apps	Goals	Apps	Goals	Apps	Goals	Apps	Goals
Ferencvárosi	2015–16	Női NB I	12	1	2	1	—		—		9 (Note: appearances in the Női NB I playoffs)	2	23	4
Ferencvárosi	2016–17	Női NB I	12	5	4	1	—		—		8	0	24	6
Ferencvárosi	2017–18	Női NB I	12	2	4	4	—		—		9	0	25	6
Ferencvárosi	2018–19	Női NB I	16	1	4	3	—		—		2	0	22	4
Ferencvárosi	2019–20	Női NB I	11	5	1	0	—		2	0	—		14	5
Ferencvárosi	Total		63	14	15	9	0	0	2	0	28	2	108	25
BK Häcken	2020	Damallsvenskan	15	1	0	0	—		—		—		15	1
BK Häcken	2021	Damallsvenskan	14	2	3	0	—		2	0	—		19	3
BK Häcken	2022	Damallsvenskan	25	5	4	0	—		4	0	—		33	5
BK Häcken	2023	Damallsvenskan	0	0	0	0	—		1	0	—		1	0
BK Häcken	2024	Damallsvenskan	12	0	4	0	—		—		—		16	0
BK Häcken			66	8	11	0	0	0	7	0	0	0	84	9
Tottenham Hotspur	2024–25	Women's Super League	8	0	1	0	4	0	—		—		13	0
West Ham United (loan)	2025–26	Women's Super League	4	1	0	0	5	0	—		—		9	1
Career total			141	23	27	9	9	0	9	0	28	2	214	35

=== International ===
As of match played 14 April 2026

Appearances and goals by national team and year
National team	Year	Apps	Goals
Hungary	2017	1	0
Hungary	2018	4	0
Hungary	2019	10	1
Hungary	2020	6	1
Hungary	2021	6	1
Hungary	2022	8	4
Hungary	2024	9	1
Hungary	2025	8	1
Hungary	2026	2	1
Total		54	10

Scores and results list Hungary's goal tally first, score column indicates score after each Csiki goal.

List of international goals scored by Anna Csiki
No.	Date	Venue	Opponent	Score	Result	Competition
1	16 June 2019	Globall Football Park, Telki, Hungary	Cyprus	5–1	6–1	Friendly
2	10 March 2020	Gold City Sport Complex, Alanya, Turkey	Romania	7–1	7–1	Friendly
3	10 June 2021	Szent Gellért Fórum, Szeged, Hungary	Serbia	3–0	4–0	Friendly
4	8 April 2022	Szusza Ferenc Stadium, Budapest, Hungary	Faroe Islands	6–0	7–0	2023 FIFA Women's World Cup qualification
5	11 April 2022	Pinatar Arena, San Pedro del Pinatar, Spain	Brazil	1–3	1–3	Friendly
6	5 September 2022	Victoria Stadium, Gibraltar	Gibraltar	10–0	12–0	Friendly
7	11 November 2022	Haladás Sportkomplexum, Szombathely, Hungary	Uzbekistan	3–0	3–0	Friendly
8	12 July 2024	Liv Bona Dea Arena, Baku, Azerbaijan	Azerbaijan	1–0	5–0	UEFA Women's Euro 2025 qualifying
9	21 February 2025	Lagator Stadium, Loznica, Serbia (Note: Due to the Belarusian involvement in the Russian invasion of Ukraine, Belarus are required to play their home matches at neutral venues, and behind closed doors, until further notice.)	Belarus	1–0	2–0	2025 Nations League
10	12 July 2024	Petar Miloševski Stadium, Bitola, North Macedonia	North Macedonia	5–0	5–0	2025 Nations League

== Honours ==
Ferencváros

- Női NB I: 2015–16, 2018–19
- Hungarian Women's Cup: 2016–17, 2017–18, 2018–19

BK Häcken

- Damallsvenskan: 2020
- Swedish Cup: 2021

Individual

- Hungarian Ballon d'Or: 2024
