= Fanny Vágó =

Hungarian footballer (born 1991)

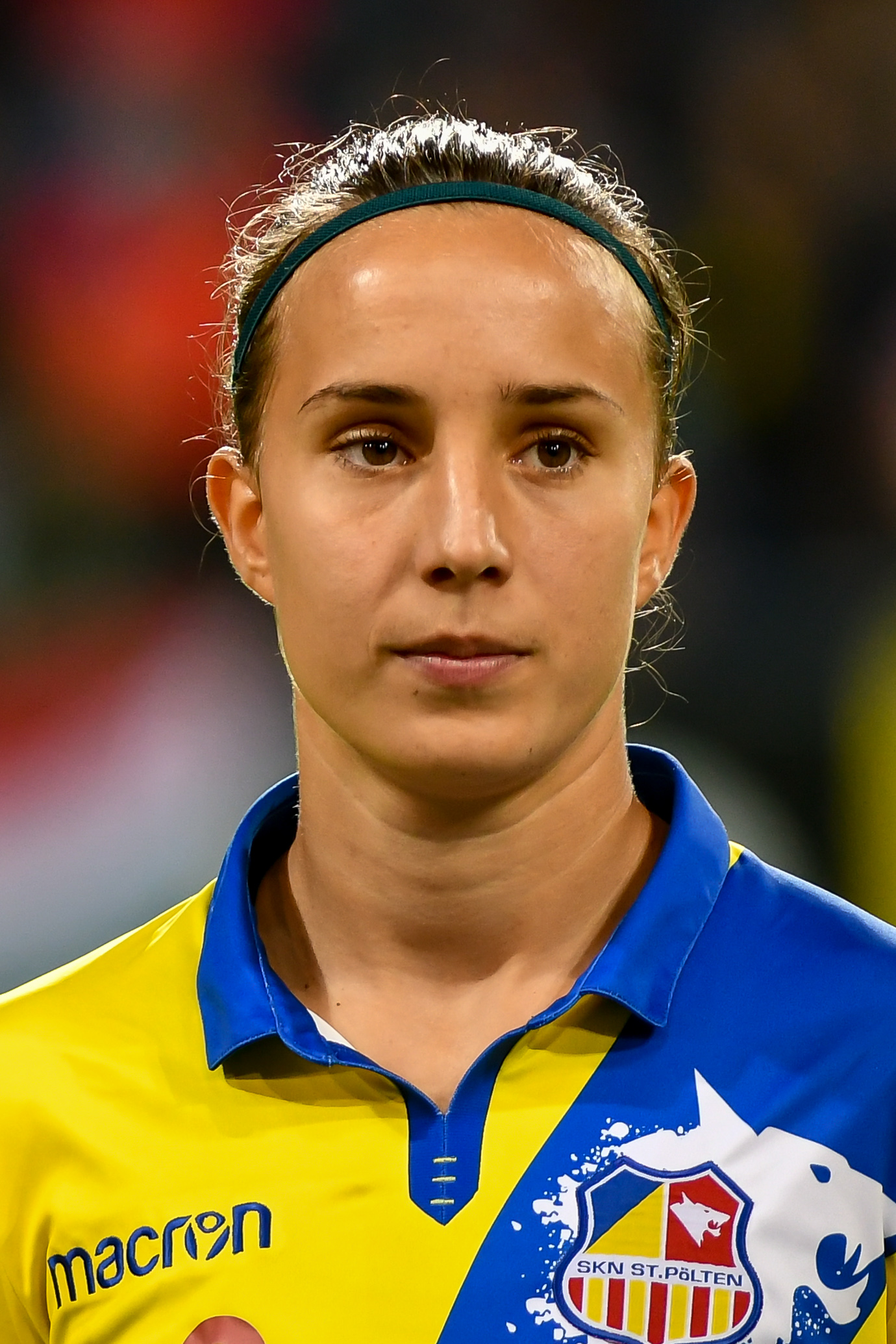
- Vágó with St. Pölten-Spratzern in 2017

Personal information
- Date of birth: 23 July 1991 (age 35)
- Place of birth: Szeged, Hungary
- Height: 1.69 m (5 ft 7 in)
- Position: Striker

Team information
- Current team: MTK Hungária FC

Senior career*
Years	Team	Apps	(Gls)
2006–2007	Femina Budapest	22	(7)
2007–2008	TSV Crailsheim	19	(2)
2009	Győri ETO	13	(6)
2009–2011	MTK Hungária FC	44	(61)
2011	Throttur	18	(5)
2011–2014	MTK Hungária FC	37	(72)
2014–2015	CFF Olimpia Cluj		
2015–2019	St. Pölten-Spratzern	72	(82)
2019–2023	Ferencváros	83	(95)
2023-2024	ŽFK Spartak Subotica	4	(4)
2024-	MTK Hungária FC	4	
Total		293	(332)

International career^{‡}
2007–2023	Hungary	146	(74)

Managerial career
- 2021–2023: Ferencváros
- * Club domestic league appearances and goals ‡ National team caps and goals as of 10 March 2024

Fanny Vágó (born 23 July 1991) is a Hungarian football striker and manager, who plays for MTK Hungária FC of the Női NB I. She is also a former member of the Hungary national team, where she scored 74 goals in 146 appearances over a 16-year career.

== Club career ==
Vágó has played for MTK Hungária FC in Hungary's Noi NB I, in Germany's Regionalliga for TSV Crailsheim, Iceland's Úrvalsdeild for Throttur and in Romania's Liga I for CFF Olimpia Cluj. She has won been the top scorer in the Női NB I four times, most recently in the 2024–25 season.

== Managerial career ==
Vágó earned a UEFA A License, and on 13 September 2021 was appointed manager of Ferencvárosi while continuing to play for the team. In March 2023, she chose managing her club over continued play with the national team after saying the national team manager Margret Kratz had forced her to choose one over the other.

As player-manager, she led Ferencvárosi to the Női NB I championship in the 2021–22 and 2022–23 seasons, the side's fifth and sixth championships, also leading the league in goalscoring as a player in both seasons.

== International career ==
Vágó was a member of the Hungary national team.

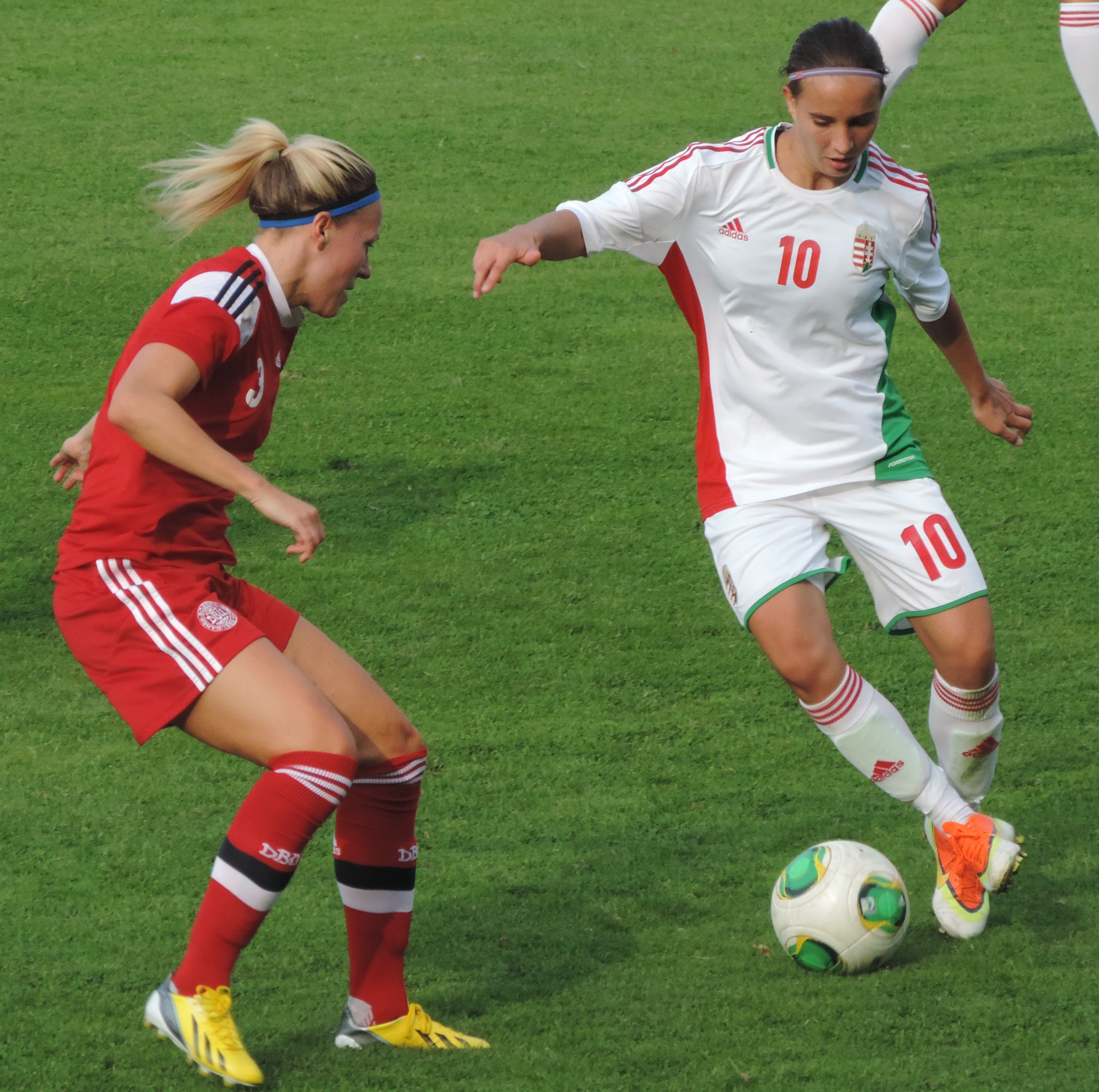
Fanny Vágó playing for the Hungary women's national football team

== Career statistics ==
Scores and results list Hungary's goal tally first, score column indicates score after each Vágó goal.

List of international goals scored by Fanny Vágó
No.	Date	Venue	Opponent	Score	Result	Competition
1	31 March 2010	Stadion Városi, Sopron, Hungary	Bosnia and Herzegovina	1–0	2–0	2011 FIFA Women's World Cup qualification
2	27 October 2011	Lovech Stadium, Lovech, Bulgaria	Bulgaria	1–0	4–0	UEFA Women's Euro 2013 qualifying
3	27 October 2011	Lovech Stadium, Lovech, Bulgaria	Bulgaria	2–0	4–0	UEFA Women's Euro 2013 qualifying
4	5 March 2012	Estádio Municipal, Santo António, Portugal	Wales	1–0	1–2	2012 Algarve Cup
5	25 April 2012	Mourneview Park, Lurgan, Northern Ireland	Northern Ireland	1–0	1–0	UEFA Women's Euro 2013 qualifying
6	19 September 2012	Stadion Városi, Sopron, Hungary	Bulgaria	1–0	9–0	UEFA Women's Euro 2013 qualifying
7	19 September 2012	Stadion Városi, Sopron, Hungary	Bulgaria	2–0	9–0	UEFA Women's Euro 2013 qualifying
8	19 September 2012	Stadion Városi, Sopron, Hungary	Bulgaria	5–0	9–0	UEFA Women's Euro 2013 qualifying
9	19 September 2012	Stadion Városi, Sopron, Hungary	Bulgaria	6–0	9–0	UEFA Women's Euro 2013 qualifying
10	8 March 2013	Municipal Stadium, Vila Real de Santo António, Portugal	Portugal	1–0	2–0	2013 Algarve Cup
11	8 March 2013	Municipal Stadium, Vila Real de Santo António, Portugal	Portugal	2–0	2–0	2013 Algarve Cup
12	31 October 2013	Bozsik Stadion, Budapest, Hungary	Bulgaria	2–0	4–0	2015 FIFA Women's World Cup qualification
13	23 November 2013	ETO Park, Győr, Hungary	Kazakhstan	4–1	4–1	2015 FIFA Women's World Cup qualification
14	14 June 2014	Almaty Central Stadium, Almaty, Kazakhstan	Kazakhstan	1–0	2–1	2015 FIFA Women's World Cup qualification
15	17 September 2014	Lovech Stadium, Lovech, Bulgaria	Bulgaria	3–0	7–0	2015 FIFA Women's World Cup qualification
16	17 September 2014	Lovech Stadium, Lovech, Bulgaria	Bulgaria	4–0	7–0	2015 FIFA Women's World Cup qualification
17	17 September 2014	Lovech Stadium, Lovech, Bulgaria	Bulgaria	5–0	7–0	2015 FIFA Women's World Cup qualification
18	17 September 2014	Lovech Stadium, Lovech, Bulgaria	Bulgaria	6–0	7–0	2015 FIFA Women's World Cup qualification
19	12 April 2016	Petrovsky Stadium, Saint Petersburg, Russia	Russia	1–1	3–3	UEFA Women's Euro 2017 qualifying
20	5 April 2018	Haladás Sportkomplexum, Szombathely, Hungary	Sweden	1–2	1–4	2019 FIFA Women's World Cup qualification
21	9 April 2018	Stadion Stanovi, Zadar, Croatia	Croatia	1–0	3–1	2019 FIFA Women's World Cup qualification
22	9 April 2018	Stadion Stanovi, Zadar, Croatia	Croatia	3–0	3–1	2019 FIFA Women's World Cup qualification
23	7 March 2020	Starlight Sport Complex, Antalya, Turkey	Hong Kong	2–0	4–0	2020 Turkish Women's Cup
24	10 March 2020	Gold City Sports Complex, Antalya, Turkey	Romania	2–1	7–1	2020 Turkish Women's Cup
25	14 June 2021	Szent Gellért Fórum, Szeged, Hungary	Serbia	1–0	2–3	Friendly
26	22 October 2021	Hampden Park, Glasgow, Scotland	Scotland	1–1	1–2	2023 FIFA Women's World Cup qualification
27	26 October 2021	Tórsvøllur, Tórshavn, Faroe Islands	Faroe Islands	1–1	7–1	2023 FIFA Women's World Cup qualification
28	26 October 2021	Tórsvøllur, Tórshavn, Faroe Islands	Faroe Islands	2–1	7–1	2023 FIFA Women's World Cup qualification
29	26 October 2021	Tórsvøllur, Tórshavn, Faroe Islands	Faroe Islands	6–1	7–1	2023 FIFA Women's World Cup qualification
30	30 November 2021	Várkerti Stadion, Kisvárda, Hungary	Ukraine	1–0	4–2	2023 FIFA Women's World Cup qualification
31	30 November 2021	Várkerti Stadion, Kisvárda, Hungary	Ukraine	2–0	4–2	2023 FIFA Women's World Cup qualification
32	19 February 2022	La Manga Club Football Stadium, La Manga, Spain	Poland	2–1	2–1	2022 Pinatar Cup
33	8 April 2022	Szusza Ferenc Stadion, Budapest, Hungary	Faroe Islands	3–0	7–0	2023 FIFA Women's World Cup qualification
34	8 April 2022	Szusza Ferenc Stadion, Budapest, Hungary	Faroe Islands	4–0	7–0	2023 FIFA Women's World Cup qualification
35	8 April 2022	Szusza Ferenc Stadion, Budapest, Hungary	Faroe Islands	7–0	7–0	2023 FIFA Women's World Cup qualification
36	5 September 2022	Victoria Stadium, Gibraltar	Gibraltar	6–0	12–0	Friendly
37	11 October 2022	Letná Stadion, Zlín, Czech Republic	Czech Republic	1–2	3–3	Friendly
38	15 November 2022	Haladás Sportkomplexum, Szombathely, Hungary	Uzbekistan	1–0	5–0	Friendly
