= Evelin Fenyvesi =

Hungarian footballer

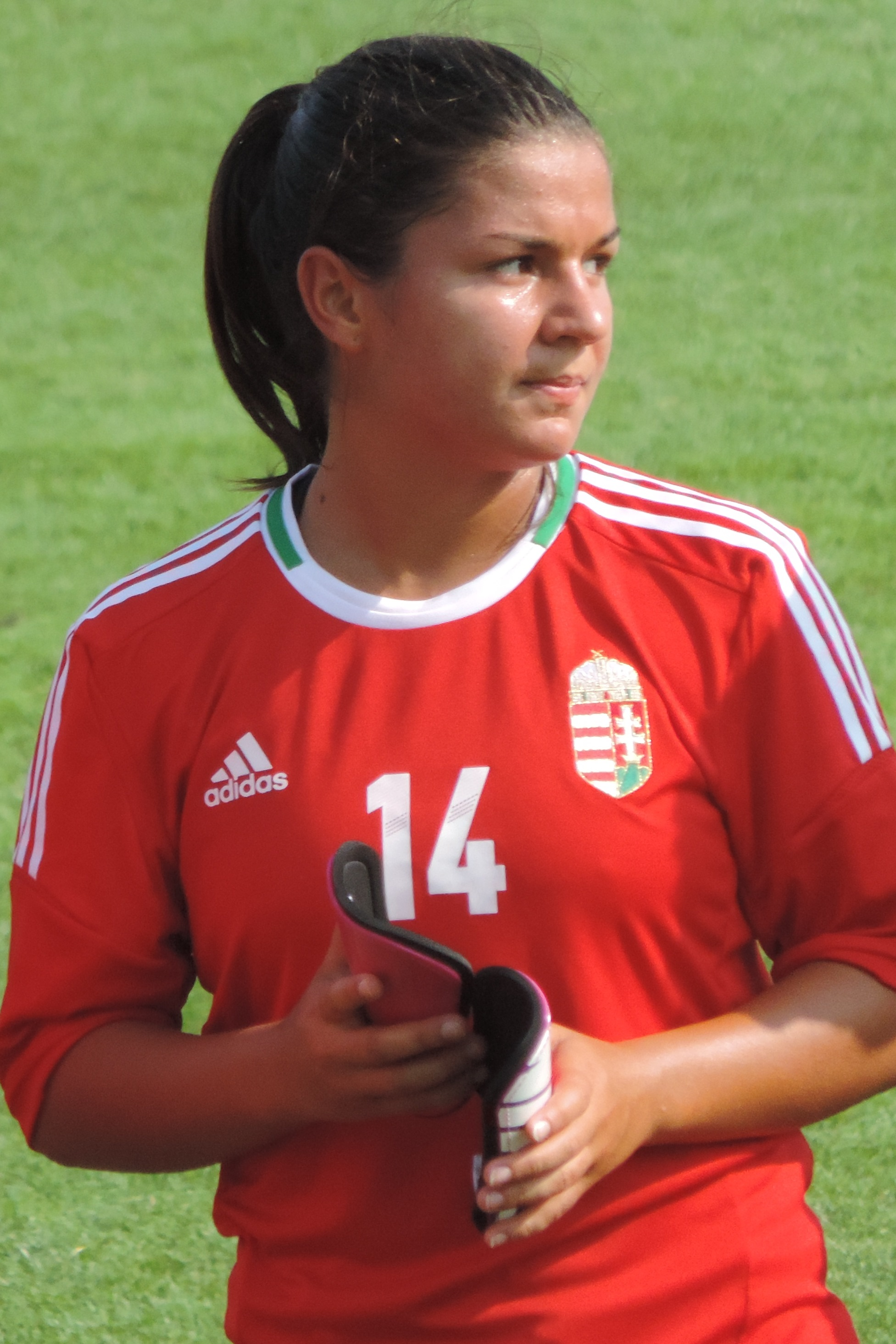
- Fenyvesi in 2013

Personal information
- Full name: Evelin Könczeyné Fenyvesi
- Date of birth: 7 November 1996 (age 30)
- Place of birth: Kiskunhalas, Hungary
- Height: 1.56 m (5 ft 1 in)
- Position: Midfielder

Team information
- Current team: Ferencváros
- Number: 14

Youth career
- 2008–2011: Jánoshalmi
- 2011–2013: Belvárosi Női
- 2013–2015: Ferencváros

Senior career*
Years	Team	Apps	(Gls)
2012–2013	Belvárosi Női	5	(4)
2013–	Ferencváros	237	(56)

International career^{‡}
	Hungary U17	14	(3)
	Hungary U19	16	(3)
2013–	Hungary	103	(8)
- * Club domestic league appearances and goals as of 22:20, 4 December 2025 (UTC) ‡ National team caps and goals as of 7 April 2025

Evelin Könczeyné Fenyvesi (born 7 November 1996) is a Hungarian footballer who plays as a midfielder for Ferencváros and has appeared for the Hungary women's national team.

== Career ==
She joined Belvárosi Női in 2011 and made her senior debut for the club in the Női NB. II on 25 August 2012 during a 14–0 loss against SZVSC. She joined Ferencváros in 2013.

Fenyvesi has been capped for the Hungary national team, appearing for the team during the 2019 FIFA Women's World Cup qualifying cycle.

== Career statistics ==
=== Club ===
Appearances and goals by club, season and competition
Club	Season	League			National cup		Continental		Other		Total	
Club	Season	Division	Apps	Goals	Apps	Goals	Apps	Goals	Apps	Goals	Apps	Goals
Belvárosi Női	2012–13	Női NB II	5	4	2	0	—		—		7	4
Belvárosi Női	Total		5	4	2	0	—		—		7	4
Ferencváros	2013–14	Női NB I	8	0	1	0	0	0	—		9	0
Ferencváros	2014–15	Női NB I	8	3	2	0	0	0	—		10	3
Ferencváros	2015–16	Női NB I	21	2	2	2	2	0	—		25	2
Ferencváros	2016–17	Női NB I	21	8	4	3	2	1	—		27	12
Ferencváros	2017–18	Női NB I	23	6	4	2	—		—		27	8
Ferencváros	2018–19	Női NB I	22	9	4	2	—		7 (Note: Appearances in Women's NB I Indoor Football Cup)	3	33	14
Ferencváros	2019–20	Női NB I	16	2	2	3	2	0	6	1	29	6
Ferencváros	2020–21	Női NB I	22	5	4	2	2	0	—		28	7
Ferencváros	2021–22	Női NB I	19	4	2	0	2	1	—		23	5
Ferencváros	2022–23	Női NB I	24	7	3	1	2	0	—		29	8
Ferencváros	2023–24	Női NB I	23	4	3	1	2	1	—		28	6
Ferencváros	2024–25	Női NB I	27	5	3	0	2	0	—		21	4
Ferencváros	2025–26	Női NB I	12	1	1	0	4	0	—		3	1
Ferencváros	Total		246	56	35	16	20	3	13	4	317	77
Career total			251	60	37	16	20	3	13	4	124	81

=== International ===
No.	Date	Venue	Opponent	Score	Result	Competition
1.	26 October 2021	Tórsvøllur, Tórshavn, Faroe Islands	Faroe Islands	3–1	7–1	2023 FIFA Women's World Cup qualification
2.	5 September 2022	Victoria Stadium, Gibraltar	Gibraltar	1–0	12–0	Friendly
3.	22 September 2023	Loro Boriçi Stadium, Shkodër, Albania	Albania	1–1	1–1	2023–24 UEFA Women's Nations League
4.	9 June 2026	Illovszky Rudolf Stadion, Budapest, Hungary	Andorra	4–1	6–1	2027 FIFA Women's World Cup qualification
5.	9 June 2026	Illovszky Rudolf Stadion, Budapest, Hungary	Andorra	5–1	6–1	2027 FIFA Women's World Cup qualification

== Honours ==
Ferencváros

- Női NB I
  - Champions (7): 2015–16, 2018–19, 2021–22, 2022–23, 2023–24, 2024–25
  - Runners-up (2): 2016–17, 2017–18
- Hungarian Women's Cup
  - Champions (5): 2015–16, 2016–17, 2017–18, 2018–19, 2020–21

Hungary

- Turkish Women's Cup
  - Runners-up (1): 2020
