= Anett Dombai-Nagy =

Hungarian footballer

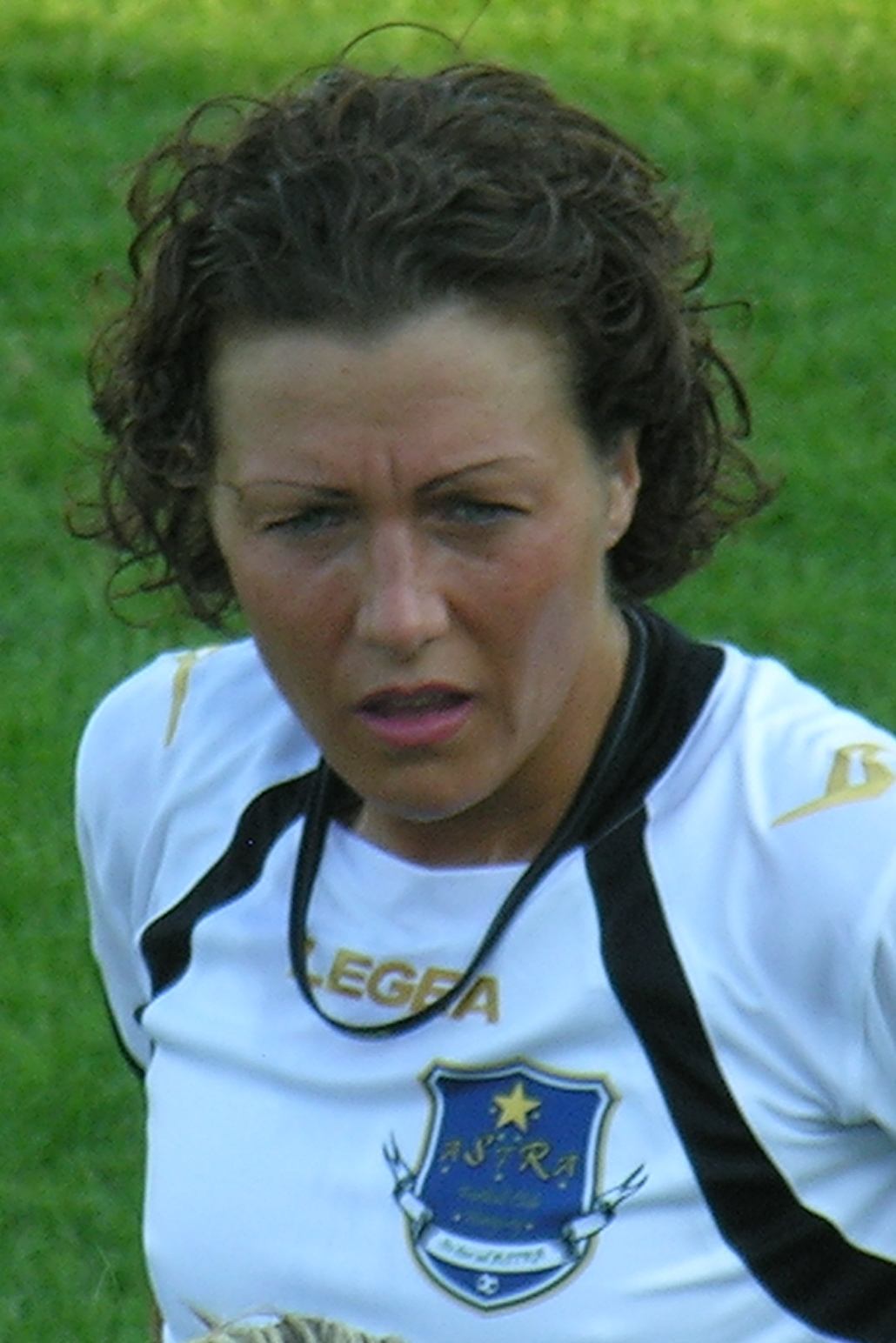

Personal information
- Full name: Anett Dombai-Nagy
- Date of birth: 1 November 1979 (age 46)
- Place of birth: Budapest, Hungary
- Position: Forward

Team information
- Current team: Astra Hungary

Senior career*
Years	Team	Apps	(Gls)
- Femina
1997–1998	László Kórház		
- Sätra
- Vasalunds
2002–2004	Renova		
2004–2005	László Kórház		
2005–2010	Femina		
2011–	Astra Hungary		

International career^{‡}
1996–2012	Hungary	70	(29)
- * Club domestic league appearances and goals ‡ National team caps and goals as of 13 September 2012

Anett Dombai-Nagy is a Hungarian football striker currently playing for Astra Hungary in the Hungarian First Division. She previously played for László Kórház SC, Renova FC and 1.FC Femina, with which she also played the European Cup. She has been a member of the Hungarian national team for over 15 years; she made her debut in the 1997 European Championship qualifying's against Bulgaria.
