= Szilvia Ruff =

Hungarian football player

Personal information
- Full name: Szilvia Ruff
- Date of birth: 19 February 1976 (age 50)
- Place of birth: Hungary
- Position: Striker

Senior career*
Years	Team	Apps	(Gls)
- László Korház
- Renova
- Femina

International career^{‡}
1992–2004	Hungary	50	(20)
- * Club domestic league appearances and goals ‡ National team caps and goals as of 29 May 2004

Szilvia Ruff (born 19 February 1976) is a Hungarian former football striker. She played for László Korház SC, Renova FC and 1.FC Femina in the Hungarian Championship. She was the championship's top scorer in 1996 and 1998 with 27 and 30 goals respectively.

She was a member of the Hungarian national team for twelve years.
