= Anita Pinczi =

Hungarian footballer

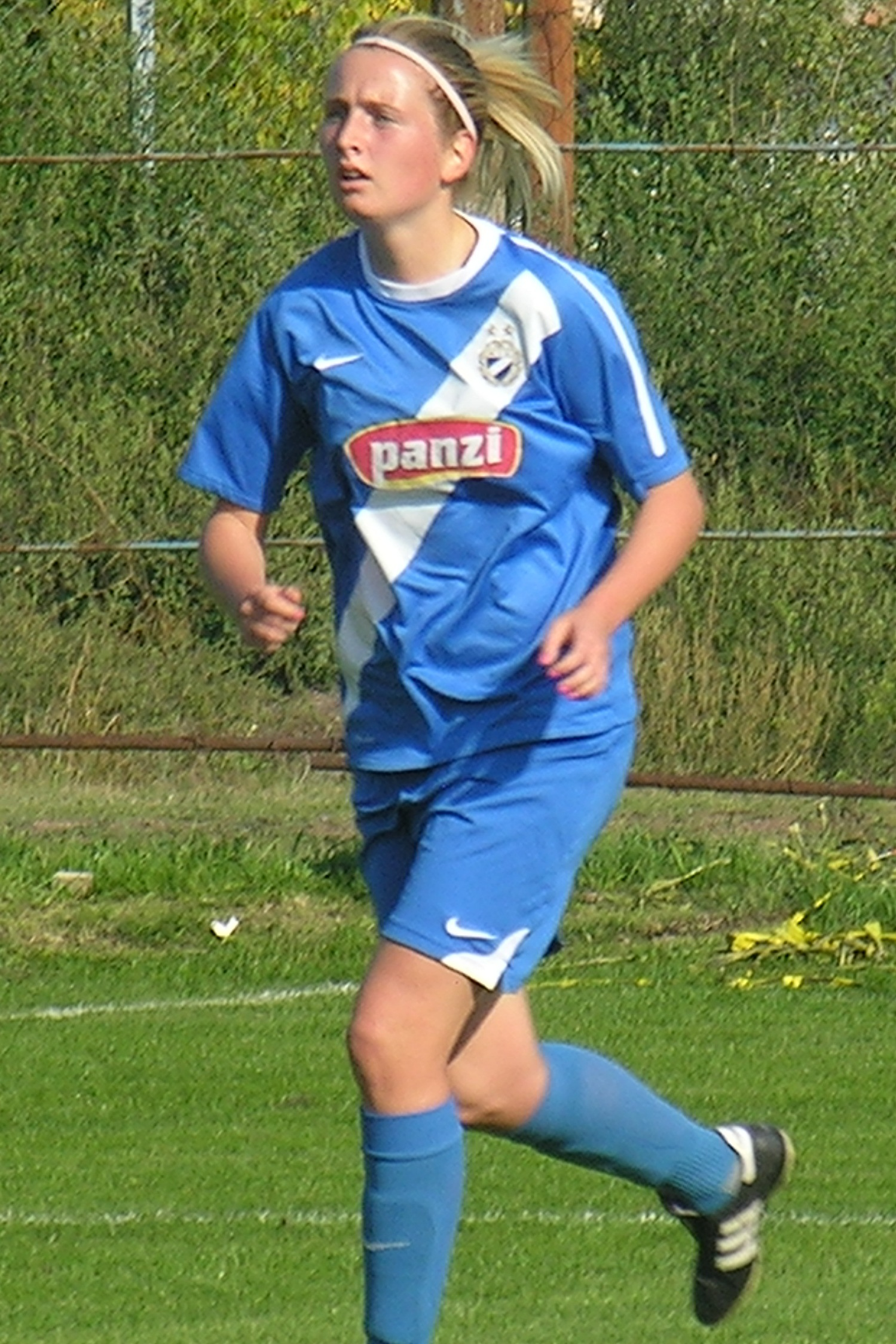

Personal information
- Date of birth: 14 November 1993 (age 32)
- Position: Defender

Team information
- Current team: MTK
- Number: 18

Youth career
- 2004–2009: Grund 1986 FC
- 2009–2011: MTK

Senior career*
Years	Team	Apps	(Gls)
2009–2014	MTK		
2013–2015	Hajdúböszörményi TE (futsal)		
2014	U Olimpia		
2015	Dorogi Diófa SE		
2015–	MTK		

International career^{‡}
	Hungary U17	6	(0)
2009–2011	Hungary U19	3	(0)
2019–	Hungary	3	(1)
- * Club domestic league appearances and goals ‡ National team caps and goals as of 12 November 2019

Anita Pinczi (born 14 November 1993) is a Hungarian footballer who plays as a defender for Női NB I club Győri ETO FC, and the Hungary women's national team.
