= Réka Szőcs =

Hungarian footballer (born 1989)

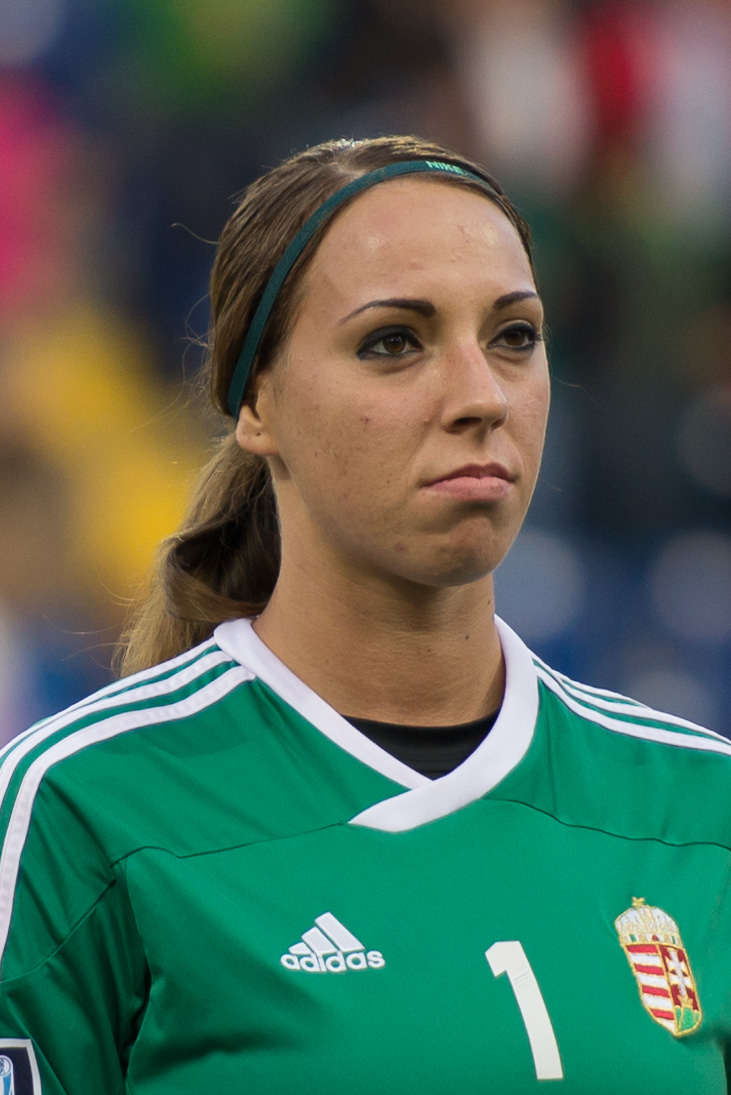
- Réka Szőcs 2014

Personal information
- Full name: Réka Szőcs
- Date of birth: 19 November 1989 (age 36)
- Place of birth: Cluj-Napoca, Romania
- Height: 1.85 m (6 ft 1 in)
- Position: Goalkeeper

Senior career*
Years	Team	Apps	(Gls)
2006–2008	Újpesti TE		
2008–2010	MTK		
2010–2011	Orlandia ’97		
2011–	MTK		

International career^{‡}
2007–	Hungary	100	(0)
- * Club domestic league appearances and goals ‡ National team caps and goals as of 18 July 2023

Réka Szőcs (born 19 November 1989 in Cluj-Napoca, Romania) is a Hungarian football goalkeeper currently playing in the Hungarian First Division for MTK Hungária, with whom she has also played the Champions League. She is a member of the Hungarian national team.
