= Henrietta Csiszár =

Hungarian footballer (born 1994)

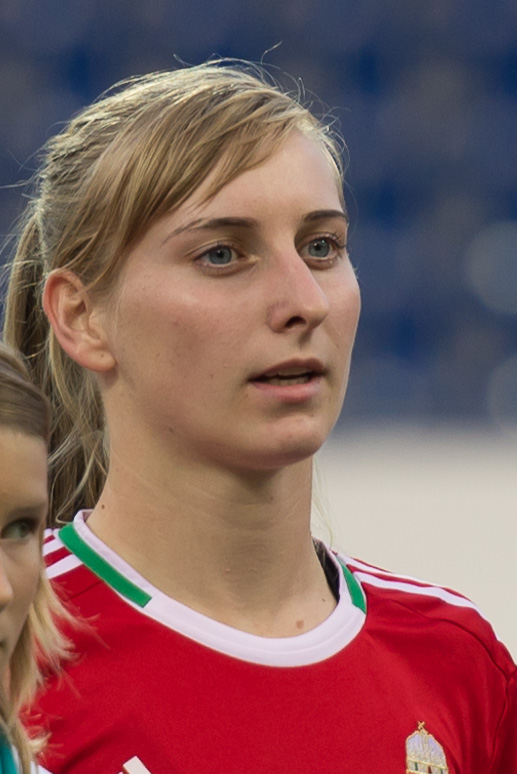

Personal information
- Full name: Henrietta Csiszár
- Date of birth: 15 May 1994 (age 32)
- Place of birth: Hajdúnánás, Hungary
- Height: 1.64 m (5 ft 5 in)
- Position: Midfielder

Team information
- Current team: Atlético Madrid
- Number: 21

Senior career*
Years	Team	Apps	(Gls)
2008–2011	Ferencváros	60	(27)
2012	Belvárosi NLC	13	(17)
2012–2015	MTK	22	(9)
2015	Targu Mures	?	(?)
2015–2016	1. FC Lübars	22	(10)
2016–2021	Bayer Leverkusen	100	(18)
2021–2026	Inter Milan	118	(8)
2026–	Atlético Madrid	0	(0)

International career^{‡}
2012–	Hungary	121	(21)
- * Club domestic league appearances and goals as of 26 July 2025 ‡ National team caps and goals as of 26 July 2025

Henrietta Csiszár (born 15 May 1994) is a Hungarian professional footballer who plays as a midfielder for Liga F club Atlético Madrid. She is the captain of the Hungarian national team.

== Club career ==
On 24 July 2021, Csiszár joined Inter Milan.

== Personal life ==
Csiszár comes from a footballing family; her father, Imre Csiszár, is a former player of Debreceni VSC, and both her brothers are professional players as well.

== Career statistics ==
=== Club ===
As of match played 27 August 2022

Appearances and goals by club, season and competition
Club	Season	League			National Cup		Europe		Total	
Club	Season	Division	Apps	Goals	Apps	Goals	Apps	Goals	Apps	Goals
Ferencváros	2008–09	Női NB I	3	1	—		—		33	9
Ferencváros	2009–10	Női NB I	14	3	3	0	—		17	3
Ferencváros	2010–11	Női NB I	22	11	1	1	—		23	12
Ferencváros	2011–12	Női NB I	21	12	—		—		21	12
Ferencváros	Total		60	27	4	1	—		64	28
Belvárosi NLC	2012–13	Női NB I	13	17	—		—		13	17
MTK	2012–13	Női NB I	13	6	2	1	—		15	7
MTK	2013–14	Női NB I	9	3	2	4	5 (Note: Appearances in UEFA Women's Champions League)	0	16	7
MTK	2014–15	Női NB I	—		—		—		—	
MTK	Total		22	9	4	5	5	0	31	14
Targu Mures	2015	??	??	??	??	??	—		??	??
1. FC Lübars	2015–16	2. Frauen-Bundesliga	22	10	4	2	—		26	12
Bayer 04 Leverkusen	2016–17	Frauen-Bundesliga	20	1	4	1	—		24	2
Bayer 04 Leverkusen	2017–18	2. Frauen-Bundesliga	19	10	1	0	—		20	10
Bayer 04 Leverkusen	2018–19	Frauen-Bundesliga	21	3	2	0	—		23	3
Bayer 04 Leverkusen	2019–20	Frauen-Bundesliga	21	1	4	0	—		25	1
Bayer 04 Leverkusen	2020–21	Frauen-Bundesliga	19	3	—		—		19	3
Bayer 04 Leverkusen	Total		100	18	11	1	—		111	19
Inter Milan	2021–22	Serie A	21	2	3	0	—		24	2
Inter Milan	2022–23	Serie A	0	0	0	0	—		0	0
Inter Milan	Total		21	2	3	0	—		24	2
Career total			238	83	26	9	5	0	269	92

== International goals ==
No.	Date	Venue	Opponent	Score	Result	Competition
1.	24 August 2012	Stara Pazova, Serbia	Serbia	3-?	3–2	Friendly match
2.	11 March 2013	Municipal Stadium, Quarteira, Portugal	Wales	1–1	1–1	2013 Algarve Cup
3.	17 September 2014	Lovech Stadium, Lovech, Hungary	Bulgaria	1–0	7–0	2015 FIFA Women's World Cup qualification
4.	26 November 2014	Municipal Stadium, Telki, Hungary	North Macedonia	7–0	8–0	Friendly match
5.	9 March 2016	Paralimni Stadium, Paralimni, Cyprus	Wales	1–0	2–1	2016 Cyprus Women's Cup, 5th place match
6.	19 October 2016	Boryspil, Ukraine	Ukraine	4–0	4–0	Friendly match
7.	5 April 2017	Municipal Stadium, Telki, Hungary	Slovenia	1–0	2–2	Friendly match
8.	30 July 2017	Balatonfüred, Hungary	Romania	1–?	3–2	Balaton Cup 2017, 3rd place match
9.	30 July 2017	Balatonfüred, Hungary	Romania	3–?	3–2	Balaton Cup 2017, 3rd place match
10.	19 October 2017	Ménfői úti Stadion, Győr, Hungary	Croatia	1–0	2–2	2019 FIFA Women's World Cup qualification
11.	19 October 2017	Ménfői úti Stadion, Győr, Hungary	Croatia	2–2	2–2	2019 FIFA Women's World Cup qualification
12.	8 October 2018	Ta' Qali, Malta	Malta	1–0	3–0	Friendly match
13.	8 October 2018	Ta' Qali, Malta	Malta	3–0	3–0	Friendly match
14.	29 August 2019	Laugardalsvöllur, Reykjavík, Iceland	Iceland	1–1	1–4	2022 UEFA Women's Euro qualification
15.	19 February 2022	La Manga Club Football Stadium, La Manga, Spain	Poland	1–0	2–1	2022 Pinatar Cup
16.	8 April 2022	Szusza Ferenc Stadion, Budapest, Hungary	Faroe Islands	2–0	7–0	2023 FIFA Women's World Cup qualification
