= Anita Pádár =

Hungarian footballer (born 1979)

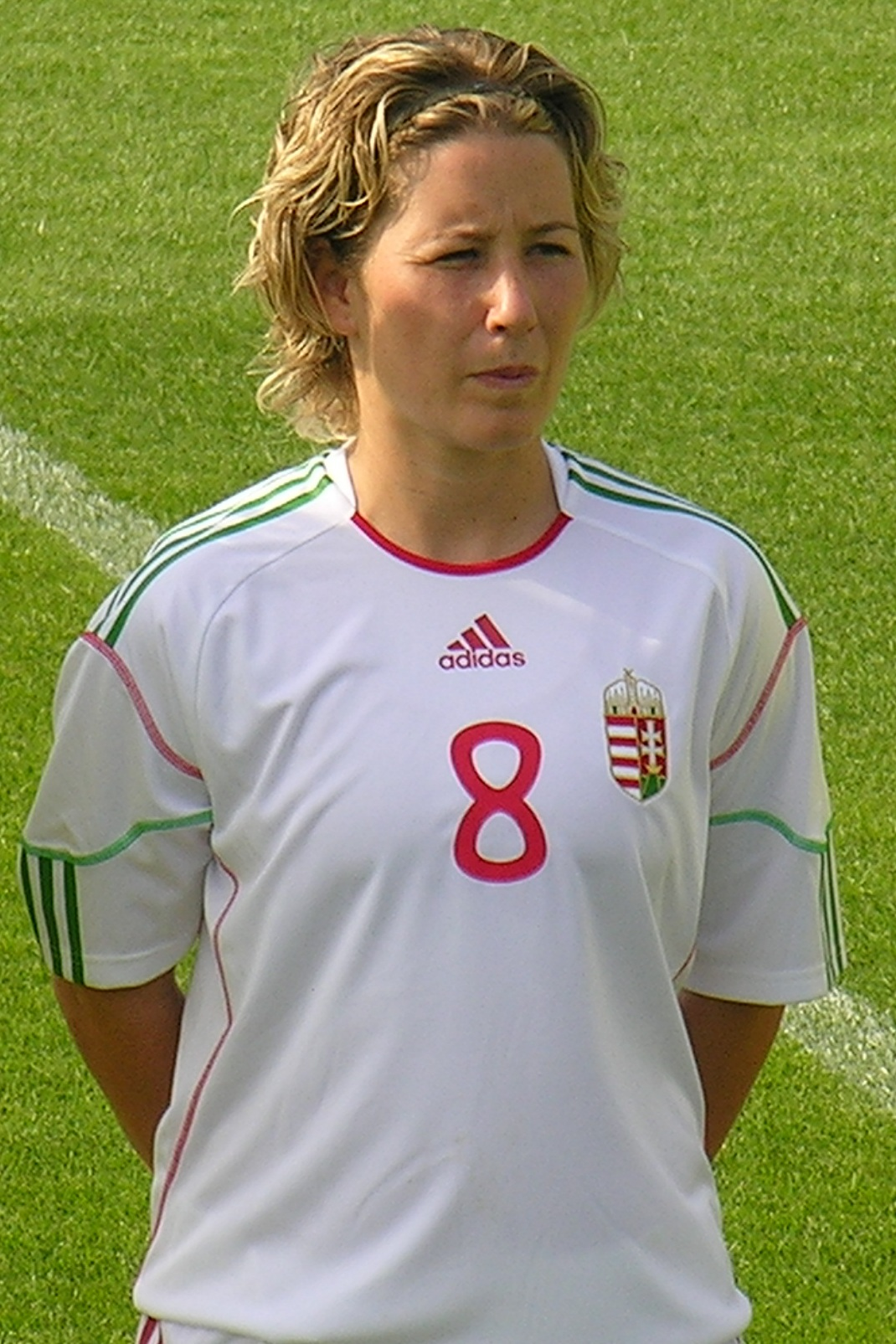
- Pádár with Hungary in 2012

Personal information
- Date of birth: 30 March 1979 (age 47)
- Place of birth: Karcag, Hungary
- Position: Striker

Senior career*
Years	Team	Apps	(Gls)
1993–1994	Szolnoki TE	?	(19)
1994–1996	László Kórház SC	26	(31)
1997	Íris FC	?	(4)
1997–2000	László Kórház SC	18	(43)
2000–2001	Renova FC	?	(23)
2001–2011	1. FC Femina	165	(363)
2012–2016	MTK	44	(96)

International career^{‡}
1995–2015	Hungary	126	(43)
- * Club domestic league appearances and goals as of 23 June 2013 ‡ National team caps and goals as of 3 August 2015

Anita Pádár (born 30 March 1979) is a Hungarian former footballer who played as a striker. She is a former member of the Hungary national team.

== Career ==
Pádár made her debut for Szolnoki TE at the age of 14. She spent the majority of her career at 1. FC Femina and MTK, winning league titles 12 times. She was the Női NB I top goalscorer for 17 consecutive seasons between 1998–99 and 2014-15. She retired from professional football in 2016. At the time of her retirement, she held the national records in caps and scoring with 43 goals in 126 matches.

== Career statistics ==
=== Club ===
Matches and Goals
Club	Season	League			National Cup			Continental				Total
Club	Season	Pos.	Apps	Goals	Pos.	Apps	Goals	Cup	Pos.	Apps	Goals	Apps	Goals
(Hungary) Szolnoki TE	1993–94	6th	?	19	—	?	?	—	—	—	—	?	19
(Hungary) László Kórház	1994–95	1st	26	14	—	2	0	—	—	—	—	28	14
(Hungary) László Kórház	1995–96	3rd	?	11	2nd	?	?	—	—	—	—	?	11
(Hungary) László Kórház	1996–97	6th	?	6	—	?	?	—	—	—	—	?	6
(Hungary) Íris SC	1996–97	4th	?	4	—	?	?	—	—	—	—	?	4
(Hungary) László Kórház	1997–98	1st	?	?	1st	?	?	—	—	—	—	?	?
(Hungary) László Kórház	1998–99	1st	?	21	1st	?	?	—	—	—	—	?	21
(Hungary) László Kórház	1999–00	1st	18	22	1st	4	9	—	—	—	—	22	31
(Hungary) Renova	2000–01	2nd	18	23	1st	?	?	—	—	—	—	18	23
(Hungary) Femina	2001–02	1st	19	24	2nd	4	1	—	—	3	1	26	26
(Hungary) Femina	2002–03	1st	?	22	—	?	?	—	—	3	2	3	24
(Hungary) Femina	2003–04	4th	?	31	—	?	?	—	—	3	2	3	33
(Hungary) Femina	2004–05	3rd	?	27	—	?	?	—	—	—	—	?	27
(Hungary) Femina	2005–06	1st	?	34	—	?	?	—	—	—	—	?	34
(Hungary) Femina	2006–07	1st	24	32	—	?	?	UCL	9–16.	6	3	30	35
(Hungary) Femina	2007–08	1st	28	52	—	—	—	—	—	3	4	31	56
(Hungary) Femina	2008–09	5th	28	44	—	—	—	—	—	3	2	31	46
(Hungary) Femina	2009–10	6th	28	38	—	—	—	—	—	—	—	28	38
(Hungary) Femina	2010–11	5th	25	35	—	—	—	—	—	—	—	25	35
(Hungary) Femina	2011–12	4th	13	24	—	—	—	—	—	—	—	13	24
(Hungary) MTK	2011–12	1st	13	33	—	1	0	—	—	—	—	14	33
(Hungary) MTK	2012–13	1st	26	55	1st	3	8	UCL	—	4	3	33	66
(Hungary) MTK	2013–14	1st		28		1	2	UCL	—	3	1	9	11
(Hungary) MTK	2014–15	1st		25					—
(Hungary) MTK	2015–16								—
Total			271	579		15	20			28	18	314	617

== Honours ==
- Női NB I: 1995, 1998, 1999, 2000, 2002, 2003, 2006, 2007, 2008, 2012, 2013, 2014
