= Bernadett Zágor =

Hungarian footballer (born 1990)

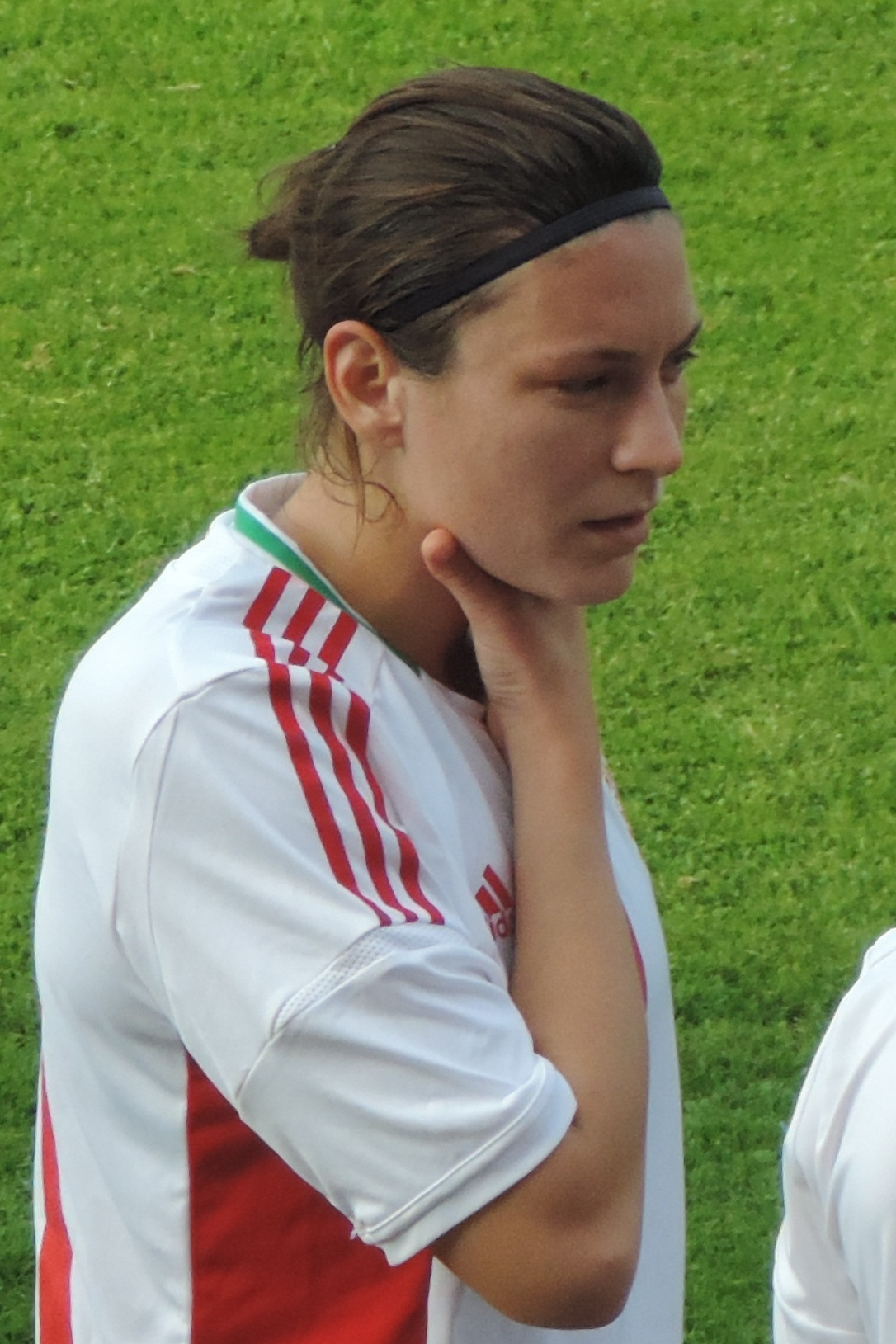
- Zágor with Hungary in 2013

Personal information
- Date of birth: 31 January 1990 (age 36)
- Place of birth: Veszprém, Hungary
- Height: 1.73 m (5 ft 8 in)
- Position: Forward

Team information
- Current team: MTK Hungária
- Number: 23

Senior career*
Years	Team	Apps	(Gls)
?–2004	SK Ajka-Padargkút SE		
2004–2005	Gizella Veszprémi SE		
2005–2011	Ferencváros		
2011–2014	MTK		
2014–2017	Ferencváros		
2017–2023	St. Pölten	0	(0)
2023–	MTK		

International career^{‡}
2009–	Hungary	72	(6)
- * Club domestic league appearances and goals ‡ National team caps and goals as of 1 December 2020

Bernadett Zágor (born 31 January 1990) is a Hungarian footballer who plays as a forward for Noi NB I club MTK Hungária. She is a member of the Hungary national team. She previously played for six years in the ÖFB-Frauenliga for SKN St. Pölten, including in the UEFA Women's Champions League.

== Career statistics ==
No.	Date	Venue	Opponent	Score	Result	Competition
1.	26 October 2021	Tórsvøllur, Tórshavn, Faroe Islands	Faroe Islands	7–1	7–1	2023 FIFA Women's World Cup qualification
