= Alesia Garcia =

Peruvian footballer (born 2000)

Alesia García
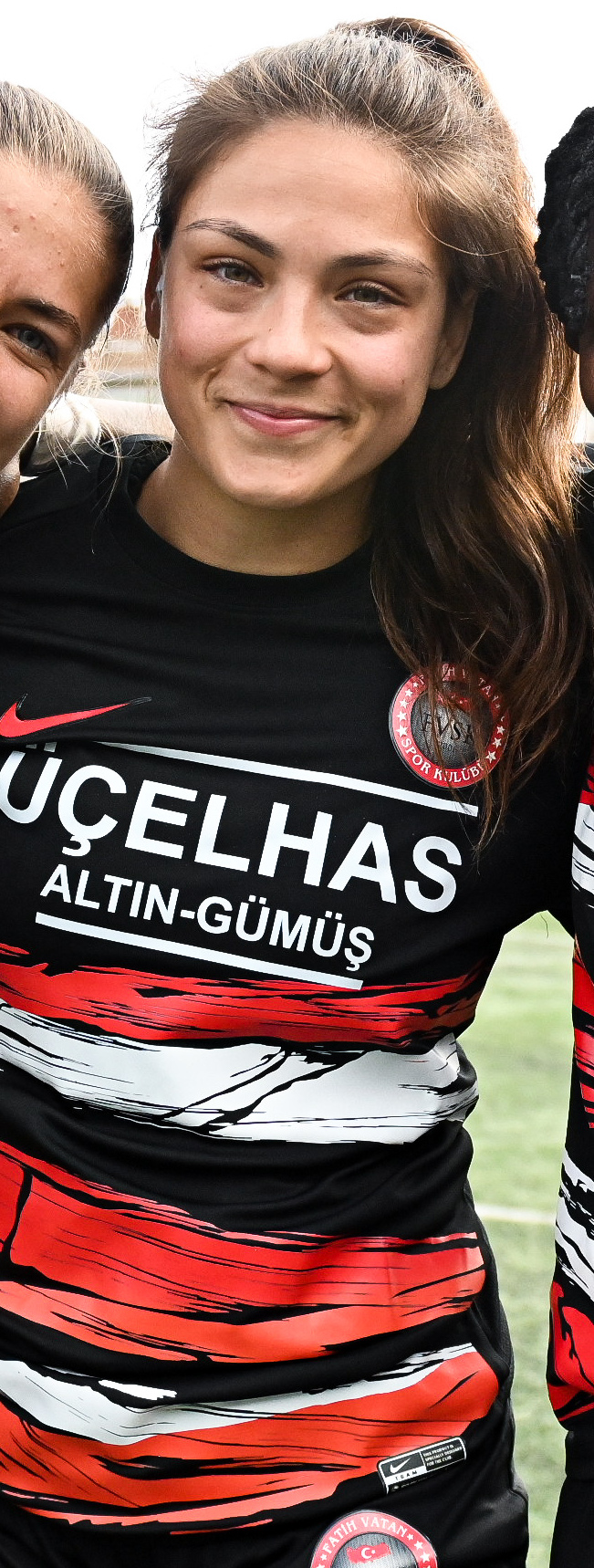
- García with Fatih Vatan Spor in March 2024

Personal information
- Full name: Alesia Marie García
- Date of birth: 13 January 2000 (age 26)
- Place of birth: Aurora, Colorado, U.S.
- Position: Forward

Team information
- Current team: Ferencvárosi TC

Youth career
- 2004–2018: Colorado Storm

College career
Years	Team	Apps	(Gls)
2018–2020	New Mexico Lobos	56	(20)
2021–2022	LSU Lady Tigers	21	(5)

Senior career*
Years	Team	Apps	(Gls)
2019	Colorado Rapids		
2023–2024	Ferencvárosi TC	12	(6)
2024	Fatih Vatan Spor	11	(2)
2024–	Ferencvárosi TC		

International career
2025–	Peru	1	(1)
- * Club domestic league appearances and goals as of 5 May 2024

Alesia Marie García (born 13 January 2000) is a professional footballer who plays as a forward for Női NB I club Ferencvárosi TC. She plays for the Peru national team.

== Early years ==
García started football playing at a very early age, impressed by her older brother when she was only 3–4 years old. She was a two-time all-conference player out of Cherokee Trail High School in her hometown. She also played on the youth team of the local club Colorado Storm in the Elite Clubs National League (ECNL), where she was from 2014 to 2018. She was named the conference’s Offensive Player of the Year in 2015.

Between 2018 and 2020, she played for her college soccer team, the New Mexico Lobos, in the NCAA Division I tournament. She scored 20 goals in 56 appearances in three seasons. In the years 2021 and 2022, she was a member of LSU Lady Tigers. She netted five goals in 21 matches played in two seasons.

== Club career ==
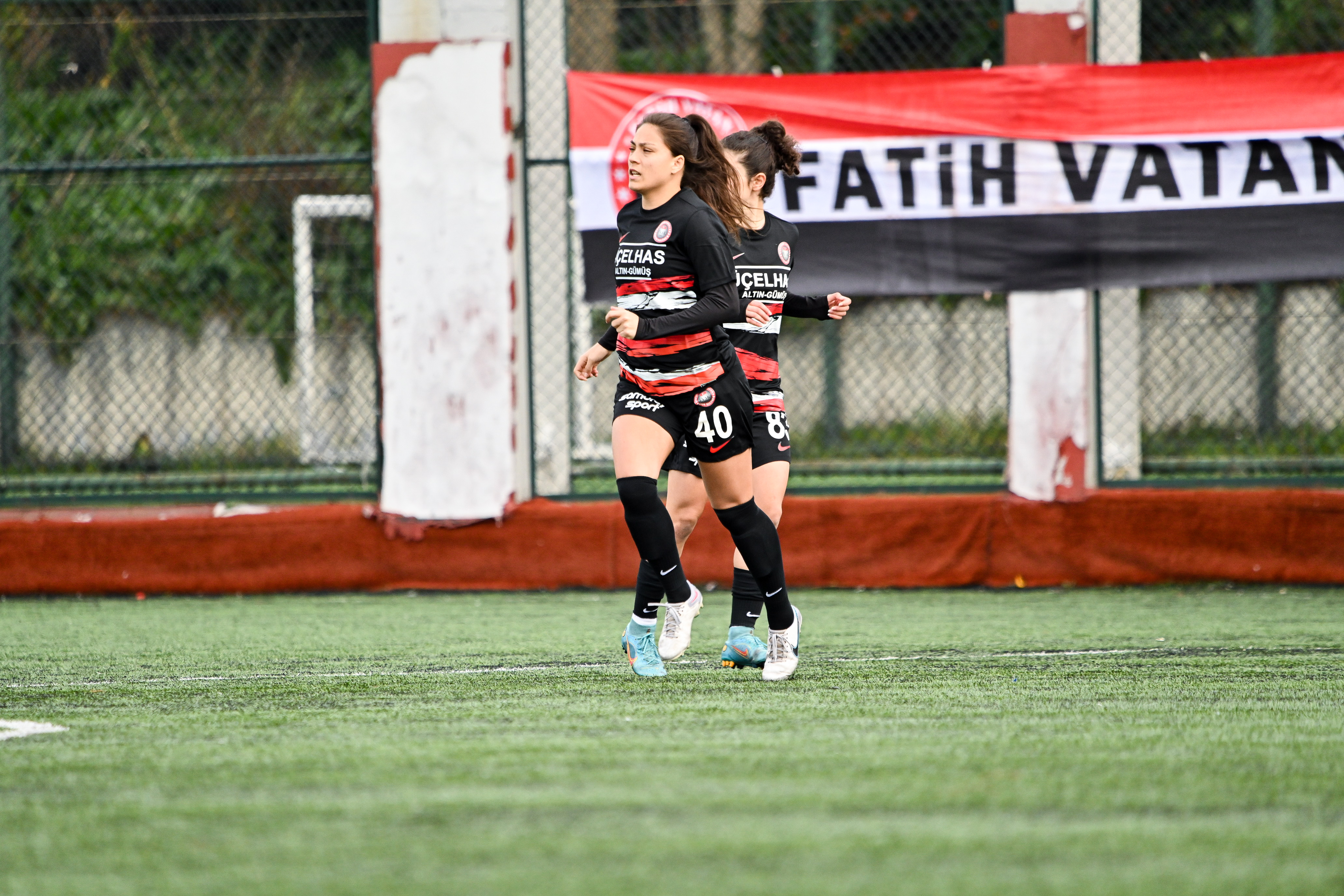
García playing for Fatih Vatan Spor in the 2023-24 Turkish Super League.

In 2019, she was with the Colorado Rapids.

In mid-February 2023, García went to Hungary and started her professional football career playing for the Budapest-based Hungarian top-level league Női NB I champion club Ferencvárosi TC in the 2022–23 season. After her team became champions at the end of the season, she took part in two matches of the 2023–24 UEFA Women's Champions League qualifying rounds, scoring one goal.

In the beginning of February 2024, she moved to Turkey and signed a deal with Fatih Vatan Spor in Istanbul to play until the end of the second half of the 2023–24 Women's Super League season. She appeared in eleven matches and scored two goals.

== International career ==
On 29 November 2025, García made her debut for the Peru national team.

=== International goals ===
No.	Date	Venue	Opponent	Score	Result	Competition
1.	29 November 2025	Estadio Garcilaso, Cusco, Peru	Chile	1–0	3–1	2025–26 CONMEBOL Women's Nations League

== Personal life ==
Alesia Marie García was born in Aurora, Colorado, United States, on 13 January 2000.

After graduating from the Cherokee Trail High School in her hometown in 2018, she started her collegial career at the University of New Mexico in Albuquerque, N.M., before she transferred in 2021 to Louisiana State University in Baton Rouge, La. She graduated in 2022.

== Honors ==
Női NB I

Ferencvárosi TC
Champions (1): 2022-23
