= Cecília Gáspár =

Hungarian footballer (1984–2024)

Personal information
- Date of birth: 11 September 1984
- Place of birth: Hungary
- Date of death: September 2024 (aged 39)

Senior career*
Years	Team	Apps	(Gls)
–2007	Femina		
2007–2008	Zbrojovka		
2008–2009	TSV Crailsheim		
2009–2010	SGS Essen		
2010–2011	ETSV Würzburg		

International career
2005–2011	Hungary	28	(0)
- * Club domestic league appearances and goals

Cecília Gáspár (11 September 1984 – September 2024) was a Hungarian footballer, who played for and captained the Hungary women's national team.

== Background ==
Gáspár started playing sports at the age of six. She attended the University of Würzburg in Germany.

Gáspár was nicknamed "Cili". She died in September 2024, at the age of 39.

== Career ==
Gáspár captained the Hungary women's national team.

She was described as a "playmaker... able to internalize tactical moves... she can also skillfully dribble the ball past her teammates with her foot".
