= Petra Kocsán =

Hungarian footballer

Personal information
- Full name: Petra Kocśan
- Date of birth: 4 June 1998 (age 28)
- Place of birth: Hungary
- Height: 1.70 m (5 ft 7 in)
- Position: Forward

Team information
- Current team: ETO FC Győr
- Number: 17

Senior career*
Years	Team	Apps	(Gls)
- Ferencváros
2021–2023	TSG Hoffenheim	11	(0)
2022	TSG Hoffenheim II	3	(0)
2023–	ETO FC Győr		

International career^{‡}
2015–	Hungary	30	(1)
- * Club domestic league appearances and goals as of 30 June 2023 ‡ National team caps and goals as of 19:39, 1 December 2020 (UTC)

Petra Kocsán (born 4 June 1998) is a Hungarian footballer who plays forward and has appeared for the Hungary women's national team.

== Career ==
Kocsán has been capped for the Hungary national team, appearing for the team during the 2019 FIFA Women's World Cup qualifying cycle.
