= Győri ETO FC (women) =

ETO FC
- Founded: 2001
- Stadium: ETO Park
- Capacity: 15,600
- Coach: Balázs Dörnyei
- League: Női Nemzeti Bajnokság I
- 2025–26: 3rd
- Website: etofcwomen.hu/en

ETO FC is a women's football club based in Győr, Hungary, that plays in Női Nemzeti Bajnokság I, the top-level women's football league in Hungary.

== Club history ==
The club was established before the 2000/2001 season. The club was a spiritual successor to Mottó FC-Győr, a former second division club, and ETO's original colors were yellow and blue after this club. It is part of the men's club of the same name.

In 2017, the team reached the final of the Hungarian Cup, where they lost to Ferencváros. The club won their first trophy in 2022, beating Viktória FC 1–0. They repeated as cup winners in 2023 with a 4–1 win over Puskás Akadémia. They won for a third consecutive time in 2024, besting MTK Hungária on penalties. They repeated the feat in 2025 with another penalty shootout win over MTK Hungária to take home their fourth Hungarian Cup in a row.

In 2022, 2023, 2024, and 2025, they were runners-up in Női NB I, falling short of Ferencváros in each season. Fanni Vachter won the 2024 season's golden boot with 29 goals.

== Honors ==
- Női NB I Runner-up (2): 2021–22, 2022–23, 2023–24, 2024–25
- Hungarian Cup Winner (2): 2022, 2023, 2024, 2025
- Hungarian Cup Finalist (1): 2017

== Current squad ==
As of 2024 December 1 Note: Flags indicate national team as defined under FIFA eligibility rules; some limited exceptions apply. Players may hold more than one non-FIFA nationality.

No.	Pos.	Nation	Player
1	GK	HUN	Borók Dorina
12	GK	SVK	Nikolett Križanová
99	GK	HUN	Maya Andrea Spilenberg
27	GK	HUN	Barbara Bíró
6	DF	SRB	Anđela Frajtović
3	DF	HUN	Ninetta Jánosi
41	DF	HUN	Laura Kovács
23	DF	HUN	Fanni Nagy
21	DF	SVK	Cintia Mónika Öreg
37	DF	SRB	Zoja Topalov
19	MF	GHA	Ernestina Abambila

No.	Pos.	Nation	Player
13	MF	HUN	Simona Horváthová
18	MF	HUN	Fanni Kern
24	MF	HUN	Rebeka Sali
9	MF	HUN	Csilla Savanya
17	FW	HUN	Petra Kocsán
8	FW	HUN	Gabriella Németh Virág
10	FW	HUN	Süle Dóra
4	FW	HUN	Sára Tóth
34	FW	HUN	Fanni Vachter
16	FW	HUN	Vida Boglárka
7	FW	USA	Kathleen White Kennedy
