= Barbara Bíró =

Hungarian footballer

Personal information
- Date of birth: 11 May 1995 (age 31)
- Position: Goalkeeper

Team information
- Current team: Győri ETO FC
- Number: 27

Senior career*
Years	Team	Apps	(Gls)
2012–2015	Újpesti TE		
2015–2022	Viktória FC-Szombathely		
2022–2024	Ferencvárosi TC		
2024–	Győri ETO FC		

International career^{‡}
2014–	Hungary	43	(0)
- * Club domestic league appearances and goals ‡ National team caps and goals as of 12 July 2023

Barbara Bíró (born 11 May 1995) is a Hungarian footballer who plays as a goalkeeper and has appeared for the Hungary women's national team.

== Career ==
Bíró has been capped for the Hungary national team, appearing for the team during the 2019 FIFA Women's World Cup qualifying cycle.
