= Sára Tóth =

Hungarian handball player (born 1993)

Personal information
- Full name: Sára Fruzsina Tóth
- Nationality: Hungarian
- Born: 18 November 1993 (age 32) Békéscsaba, Hungary
- Height: 1.76 m (5 ft 9 in)

Sport
- Sport: Handball
- Position: Left Back
- Current club: Orosházi NKC

Youth career
- Years: Team
- –2008: Békéscsabai ENKSE

Senior clubs
- Years: Team
- 2008–2016: Békéscsabai ENKSE
- 2016–2017: Szeged KKSE
- 2017–: Orosházi NKC

Sára Tóth (born 18 November 1993 in Békéscsaba) is a Hungarian handballer who plays for Orosházi NKC in left back position.

== Achievements ==
- Magyar Kupa:
  - Silver Medalist: 2012
