= Hungary women's national football team =

Women's national association football team representing Hungary

Hungary
- Association: Magyar Labdarúgó Szövetség (MLSZ)
- Confederation: UEFA (Europe)
- Head coach: Alexandra Szarvas
- Captain: Henrietta Csiszár
- Most caps: Fanny Vágó (146)
- Top scorer: Fanny Vágó (74)
- FIFA code: HUN
First colours	Second colours

FIFA ranking
- Current: 45 (20 October 2026)
- Highest: 26 (July 2003 – March 2004)
- Lowest: 47 (June – August 2025)

First international
- Hungary 1–0 West Germany (Siófok, Hungary; 9 April 1985)

Biggest win
- Hungary 13–0 Bosnia and Herzegovina (Bük, Hungary; 4 September 1999)

Biggest defeat
- Hungary 0–13 England (Tapolca, Hungary; 27 October 2005)

The Hungary women's national football team represents Hungary in international women's football. The team is controlled by the Hungarian Football Federation.

== Results and fixtures ==
The following is a list of match results in the last 12 months, as well as any future matches that have been scheduled.

Legend

Win Draw Loss Fixture

=== 2025 ===
29 November Friendly	Republic of Ireland	3–2	Hungary	Marbella, Spain
12:30 CET	Larkin 8'; Carusa 19'; O'Sullivan 53'	Report	Vincze 27'; Kaján 89'	Stadium: Marbella Football Center; Attendance: 0 (behind closed doors)

=== 2026 ===
3 March 2026 World Cup qualifier	Andorra	0–0	Hungary	Andorra la Vella, Andorra
19:00		Report		Stadium: Estadi Nacional; Attendance: 330; Referee: Roxana Recorean (Romania)

7 March 2026 World Cup qualifier	Hungary	1–0	Azerbaijan	Felcsút, Hungary
14:30	Pápai 45+1'	Report		Stadium: Pancho Aréna; Attendance: 760; Referee: Filipa Pereira Cunha (Portugal)

14 April 2026 World Cup qualifier	North Macedonia	0–5	Hungary	Bitola, North Macedonia
16:00		Report	Csányi 2', 9', 20'; Savanya 45+1'; Csiki 88'	Stadium: Petar Miloševski Football Stadium; Attendance: 200; Referee: Davina Lutz (Germany)

18 April 2026 World Cup qualifier	Hungary	7–0	North Macedonia	Felcsút, Hungary
15:00	Mayer 21', 51'; Paneva 35' (o.g.); Pápai 47'; Kaján 68'; Va. Nagy 85'; Savanya 90+3' (pen.)	Report		Stadium: Pancho Aréna; Attendance: 353; Referee: Paola Cebollada López (Spain)

5 June 2026 World Cup qualifier	Azerbaijan	1–2	Hungary	Sumgait, Azerbaijan
16:00 (18:00 UTC+4)	Asadova 74'	Report (FIFA); Report (UEFA)	Csányi 12'; V. Nagy 85'	Stadium: Mehdi Huseynzade Sumgait City Stadium; Attendance: 550; Referee: Vanja Janković (Slovenia)

9 June 2026 World Cup qualifier	Hungary	6–1	Andorra	Budapest, Hungary
19:00	Vik. Nagy 3'; Kaján 39'; Va. Nagy 41'; Fenyvesi 57', 69'; Pusztai 89'	Report (FIFA); Report (UEFA)	Da Cruz 55'	Stadium: Illovszky Rudolf Stadion; Referee: Melek Dakan (Turkey)

9 October 2026 World Cup play-offs	Hungary	0–8	Netherlands	Felcsút, Hungary
20:00		Report (FIFA); Report (UEFA)	Beerensteyn 12', 14', 90+1'; Pelova 26', 58', 62'; Brugts 45+1'; Egurrola 49'	Stadium: Pancho Aréna; Attendance: 756; Referee: Olga Blotskaya (Belarus)

13 October 2026 World Cup play-offs	Netherlands	3–0	Hungary	Tilburg, Netherlands
20:45	Brugts 8'; Beerensteyn 40'; Egurrola 45+4'	Report (FIFA); Report (UEFA)		Stadium: Koning Willem II Stadion; Referee: Franziska Wildfeuer (Germany)

- Official Hungary results and fixtures (in English)

== Coaching staff ==
=== Current coaching staff ===
Position	Name
Head coach	Alexandra Szarvas

=== Manager history ===
- (Hungary) Ferenc Tóth (1985–)
- (Hungary) Ferenc Eipel (1989–1994)
- (Hungary) Dezső Bundzsák (1995–1996)
- (Hungary) István Bacsó (1997–2004)
- (Hungary) András Telek (2005–2007)
- (Hungary) Atilla Vágó (2007–2010)
- (Hungary) László Kiss (2010–2013)
- (Hungary) Atilla Vágó (2013–2014)
- (Hungary) Edina Markó (2014–2020)
- (Germany) Margret Kratz (2021–2024)
- (Hungary) Alexandra Szarvas (2024–present)

== Players ==
- Source: Official Hungary squad (in English)

=== Current squad ===
The following players were called up for the 2027 FIFA Women's World Cup qualification – UEFA League C matches against Azerbaijan and Andorra on 5 and 9 June 2026, respectively.

Caps and goals correct as of 9 June 2026, after the match against Andorra.

No.	Pos.	Player	Date of birth (age)	Caps	Goals	Club
1	GK	Lauren Brzykcy	8 November 1999 (age 27)	18	0	(The Football Association) Bristol City
12	GK	Barbara Bíró	11 May 1995 (age 31)	44	0	(Hungarian Football Federation) Győri ETO
22	GK	Anna Terestyényi	22 March 2001 (age 25)	0	0	(Hungarian Football Federation) Újpest
2	DF	Beatrix Fördős	7 January 2002 (age 24)	17	1	(German Football Association) 1. FC Nürnberg
3	DF	Laura Palakovics	16 April 2002 (age 24)	13	0	(Hungarian Football Federation) Puskás Akadémia
9	DF	Csilla Savanya	17 April 2004 (age 22)	20	2	(Hungarian Football Federation) Győri ETO
11	DF	Virág Nagy	4 July 2001 (age 25)	42	0	(Royal Belgian Football Association) OH Leuven
14	DF	Georgina Pataki	13 March 2004 (age 22)	1	0	(Hungarian Football Federation) MTK
16	DF	Diána Csányi	20 March 1998 (age 28)	55	8	(Hungarian Football Federation) Ferencvárosi TC
18	DF	Laura Kovács	15 June 2000 (age 26)	50	1	(Hungarian Football Federation) Győri ETO
21	DF	Barbara Zágonyi	21 February 1999 (age 27)	1	0	(Hungarian Football Federation) Ferencvárosi TC
23	DF	Hanna Németh	17 September 1998 (age 28)	41	2	(German Football Association) Werder Bremen
4	MF	Sára Pusztai	16 November 2001 (age 25)	33	9	(German Football Association) RB Leipzig
6	MF	Evelin Fenyvesi	7 November 1996 (age 30)	111	10	(Hungarian Football Federation) Ferencváros
7	MF	Henrietta Csiszár (captain)	15 May 1994 (age 32)	137	22	(Italian Football Federation) Inter Milan
8	MF	Vanessza Nagy	13 February 2002 (age 24)	6	3	(Hungarian Football Federation) Ferencváros
13	MF	Viktória Nagy	15 June 2001 (age 25)	10	1	(Hungarian Football Federation) Ferencváros
20	MF	Lili Nagy	26 September 2005 (age 21)	0	0	(Hungarian Football Federation) Puskás Akadémia
5	FW	Emőke Pápai	24 June 2003 (age 23)	56	9	(German Football Association) 1. FC Nürnberg
10	FW	Anna Csiki	14 November 1999 (age 27)	57	9	(Portuguese Football Federation) Benfica
15	FW	Zsanett Kaján	16 September 1997 (age 29)	70	17	(Italian Football Federation) Parma
17	FW	Borbála Vincze	22 July 2007 (age 19)	7	1	(Swiss Football Association) FC Zürich Frauen
19	FW	Dóra Zeller	6 January 1995 (age 31)	95	34	(German Football Association) FC Köln

=== Recent call-ups ===
The following players have also been called up to the squad within the past 12 months.

Pos.	Player	Date of birth (age)	Caps	Goals	Club	Latest call-up
GK	Réka Tankó	12 September 2004 (age 22)	0	0	(Hungary) Puskás Akadémia	v. Republic of Ireland; 29 November 2025
GK	Ágnes Pongrácz	21 August 2005 (age 21)	3	0	(Hungary) Puskás Akadémia	v. Slovakia; 28 October 2025
MF	Fanni Nagy ^{INJ}	3 January 2003 (age 23)	25	0	(Austria) SKN St. Pölten	v. Azerbaijan; 5 June 2026
MF	Dóra Süle	20 September 1998 (age 28)	24	4	(Hungary) Győri ETO	v. North Macedonia; 18 April 2026
MF	Zsófia Mayer	5 January 2005 (age 21)	10	4	(Hungary) Puskás Akadémia	v. North Macedonia; 18 April 2026
MF	Brigitta Pulins	12 July 1999 (age 27)	0	0	(Switzerland) Grasshopper Club Zurich	v. Azerbaijan; 7 March 2026
MF	Viktória Szabó	26 May 1997 (age 29)	118	7	(Italy) FC Como Women	v. Republic of Ireland; 29 November 2025
MF	Luca Papp	24 April 2002 (age 24)	39	1	(Germany) VfL Wolfsburg	v. Republic of Ireland; 29 November 2025
MF	Napsugár Sinka	30 May 2003 (age 23)	0	0	(Germany) TSG Hoffenheim	v. Republic of Ireland; 29 November 2025
MF	Kinga Siklér	24 December 1995 (age 30)	8	2	(Hungary) MTK Budapest	v. Slovakia; 28 October 2025
FW	Bernadett Zágor	31 January 1990 (age 36)	91	8	(Hungary) MTK Budapest	v. Slovakia; 28 October 2025
Notes: ^{INJ} = Withdrew due to injury; ^{PRE} = Preliminary squad / standby; ^{RET} = Retired from the national team

|}

== Records ==
As of 9 June 2026

Players in bold are still active with the national team.

=== Most appearances ===
Rank	Player	Career	Caps	Goals
1	Fanny Vágó	2007–2023	146	74
2	**Henrietta Csiszár**	2012–present	137	22
3	Anita Pádár	1995–2015	126	43
4	Angéla Smuczer	2001–2017	124	3
5	**Viktória Szabó**	2013–present	118	7
6	**Réka Szőcs**	2007–present	114	0
7	Zsófia Rácz	2007–2020	113	10
8	**Evelin Fenyvesi**	2013–present	111	10
9	**Dóra Zeller**	2013–present	95	34
9	Szilvia Szeitl	2007–2018	95	2

=== Top goalscorers ===
Rank	Player	Career	Goals	Caps	Avg.
1	Fanny Vágó	2007–2023	74	146	0.51
2	Anita Pádár	1995–2015	43	126	0.34
3	**Dóra Zeller**	2013–present	34	95	0.36
4	Zsanett Jakabfi	2007–2020	32	62	0.52
5	Anett Dombai-Nagy	1996–2012	29	70	0.41
6	Edit Kern	1985–1995	25	36	0.69
7	Rita Bajkó	1990–1999	22	59	0.37
7	**Henrietta Csiszár**	2012–present	22	137	0.16
9	Szilvia Ruff	1992–2004	20	50	0.40
10	Katalin Bökk	1991–2002	19	43	0.44

== Competitive record ==
=== FIFA Women's World Cup ===
FIFA Women's World Cup record									Qualification record						
Year	Result	GP	W	D*	L	GF	GA	GD	GP	W	D*	L	GF	GA	GD
(China) 1991	Did not qualify								UEFA Euro 1991						
(Sweden) 1995	Did not qualify								UEFA Euro 1995						
(United States) 1999	Did not qualify								8	5	1	2	32	9	+23
(United States) 2003	Did not qualify								8	8	0	0	33	5	+28
(China) 2007	Did not qualify								8	0	1	7	1	35	−34
(Germany) 2011	Did not qualify								8	4	3	1	15	10	+5
(Canada) 2015	Did not qualify								10	4	0	6	20	25	−5
(France) 2019	Did not qualify								8	1	1	6	8	26	−18
(Australia) (New Zealand) 2023	Did not qualify								8	3	0	5	19	19	0
(Brazil) 2027	Did not qualify								8	5	1	2	21	13	+8
(Costa Rica) (Jamaica) (Mexico) (United States) 2031	To be determined								To be determined						
(United Kingdom) 2035	To be determined								To be determined						
Total	-	-	-	-	-	-	-	-	66	30	7	29	149	142	+7

*Draws include knockout matches decided on penalty kicks.

=== Olympic Games ===
Summer Olympics record
Year	Result	GP	W	D	L	GF	GA
(United States) 1996	Did not qualify						
(Australia) 2000	Did not qualify						
(Greece) 2004	Did not qualify						
(China) 2008	Did not qualify						
(United Kingdom) 2012	Did not qualify						
(Brazil) 2016	Did not qualify						
(Japan) 2020	Did not qualify						
(France) 2024	Unable to qualify (Note: Hungary was unable to qualify since Hungary was in the “League B” at the 2023–24 UEFA Women's Nations League.)						
(United States) 2028	To be determined						
(Australia) 2032	To be determined						
Total	-	-	-	-	-	-	-

=== UEFA Women's Championship ===
UEFA Women's Championship record								Qualifying record							
Year	Result	Pld	W	D*	L	GF	GA	Pld	W	D*	L	GF	GA	P/R	Rnk
(England) (Italy) (Norway) (Sweden) 1984	Did not enter							Did not enter							
(Norway) 1987	Did not qualify							6	3	1	2	8	7	–	
(West Germany) 1989	Did not qualify							6	1	1	4	8	14	–	
(Denmark) 1991	Did not qualify							8	3	1	4	8	11	–	
(Italy) 1993	Did not qualify							4	2	1	1	5	2	–	
(England) (Germany) (Norway) (Sweden) 1995	Did not qualify							6	0	3	3	5	18	–	
(Norway) (Sweden) 1997	Did not qualify							6	2	1	3	12	9	–	
(Germany) 2001	Did not qualify							8	6	0	2	44	7	–	
(England) 2005	Did not qualify							8	1	1	6	6	28	–	
(Finland) 2009	Did not qualify							8	0	1	7	6	29	–	
(Sweden) 2013	Did not qualify							10	3	1	6	18	22	–	
(Netherlands) 2017	Did not qualify							8	2	2	4	8	20	–	
(England) 2022	Did not qualify							8	2	1	5	11	20	–	
(Switzerland) 2025	Did not qualify							8	2	1	5	10	15	(Note: From Euro 2025 onwards a new qualifying format was introduced, linked to the Women's Nations League where teams are divided into leagues with promotion/relegation between the leagues at the end of each cycle.)	26th
(Germany) 2029	To be determined							To be determined							
Total	-	-	-	-	-	-	-	94	27	15	52	149	202	26th	

*Draws include knockout matches decided on penalty kicks.

=== UEFA Women's Nations League ===
UEFA Women's Nations League record
Year	League	Group	Pos	Pld	W	D	L	GF	GA	P/R	RK
2023–24	B	1	2nd	8	2	2	4	13	19	*	24th
2025	B	3	3rd	6	1	1	4	2	6	▼	28th
Total				14	3	3	8	15	25		

▲	Promoted at end of season
Same position	No movement at end of season
▼	Relegated at end of season
*	Participated in promotion/relegation play-offs

== See also ==
- Sport in Hungary
  - Football in Hungary
    - Women's football in Hungary
- Hungary women's national football team
  - Hungary women's national football team results
  - List of Hungary women's international footballers
- Hungary women's national under-20 football team
- Hungary women's national under-17 football team
- Hungary men's national football team
