= Oršoja Vajda =

Serbian footballer (born 1997)

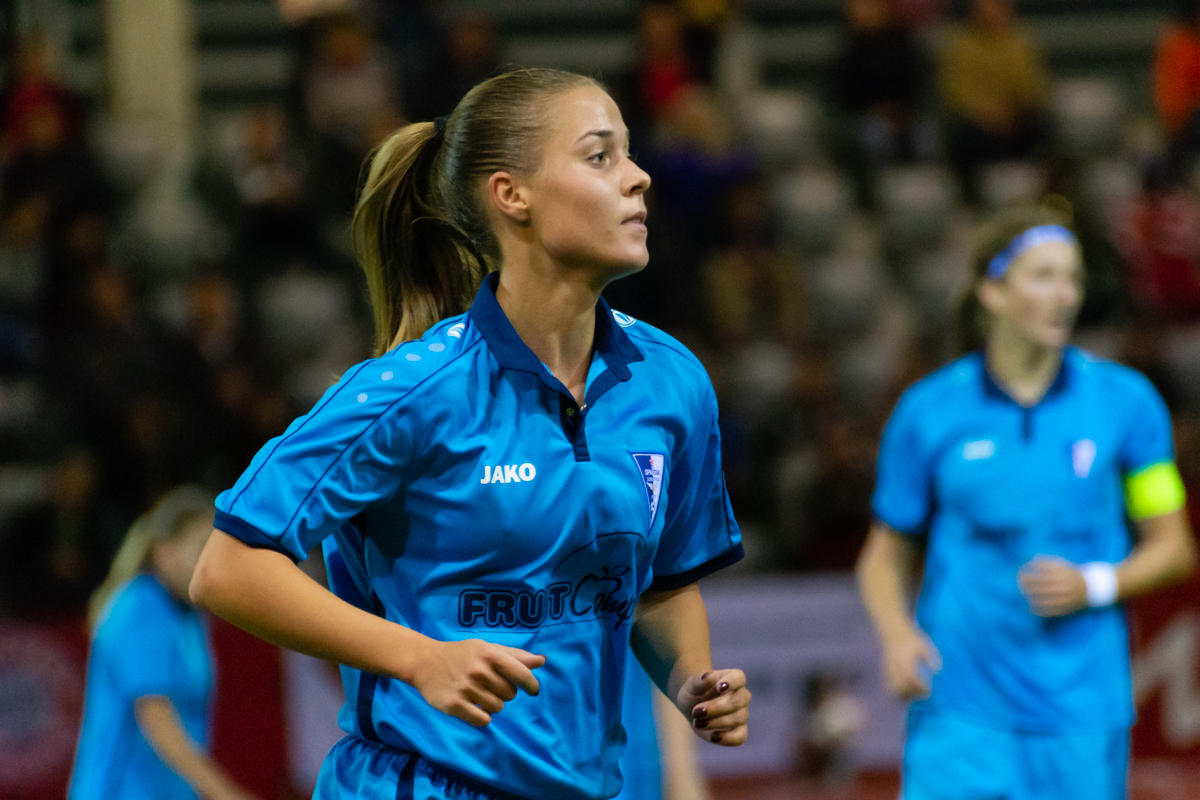
- Oršoja Vajda in 2018

Personal information
- Date of birth: 4 February 1997 (age 29)
- Height: 1.71 m (5 ft 7 1/2 in)
- Position: Defender

Team information
- Current team: ŽFK Spartak Subotica

Senior career*
Years	Team	Apps	(Gls)
- ŽFK Spartak Subotica

International career^{‡}
	Serbia	15	(0)
- * Club domestic league appearances and goals as of 19:22, 30 August 2019 (UTC) ‡ National team caps and goals as of 10 April 2023

Oršoja Vajda (Serbian Cyrillic: Оршоја Вајда; born 4 February 1997) is a Serbian footballer who plays as a defender and has appeared for the Serbia women's national team.

== Career ==
Vajda has been capped for the Serbia national team, appearing for the team during the 2019 FIFA Women's World Cup qualifying cycle.
