= László Kórház SC =

László Korház
- Full name: László Korház Sport Club
- Founded: 1979
- Dissolved: 2006

László Korház SC was a Hungarian women's football club from Ferencváros, Budapest.

Founded in 1979, László Korház was along with local rivals 1. FC Femina one of the two major forces in Hungarian women's football up to the end of the 20th century, winning 18 national titles, including the first three editions of the national championship and three triples in a row in the late 1990s. In 2003 it won its final fifth national cup title, and three years later it was disbanded.

With nine titles, László Korház remains the championship's second most successful team next to Femina.

== Titles ==
- 9 Hungarian Leagues (1985 — 1987, 1989, 1993, 1994, 1998 — 2000)
- 5 Hungarian Cups (1998 — 2000, 2003, 2004)
- 4 Hungarian Supercups (1996, 1998 — 2000)
