= Margret Kratz =

German footballer (born 1962)

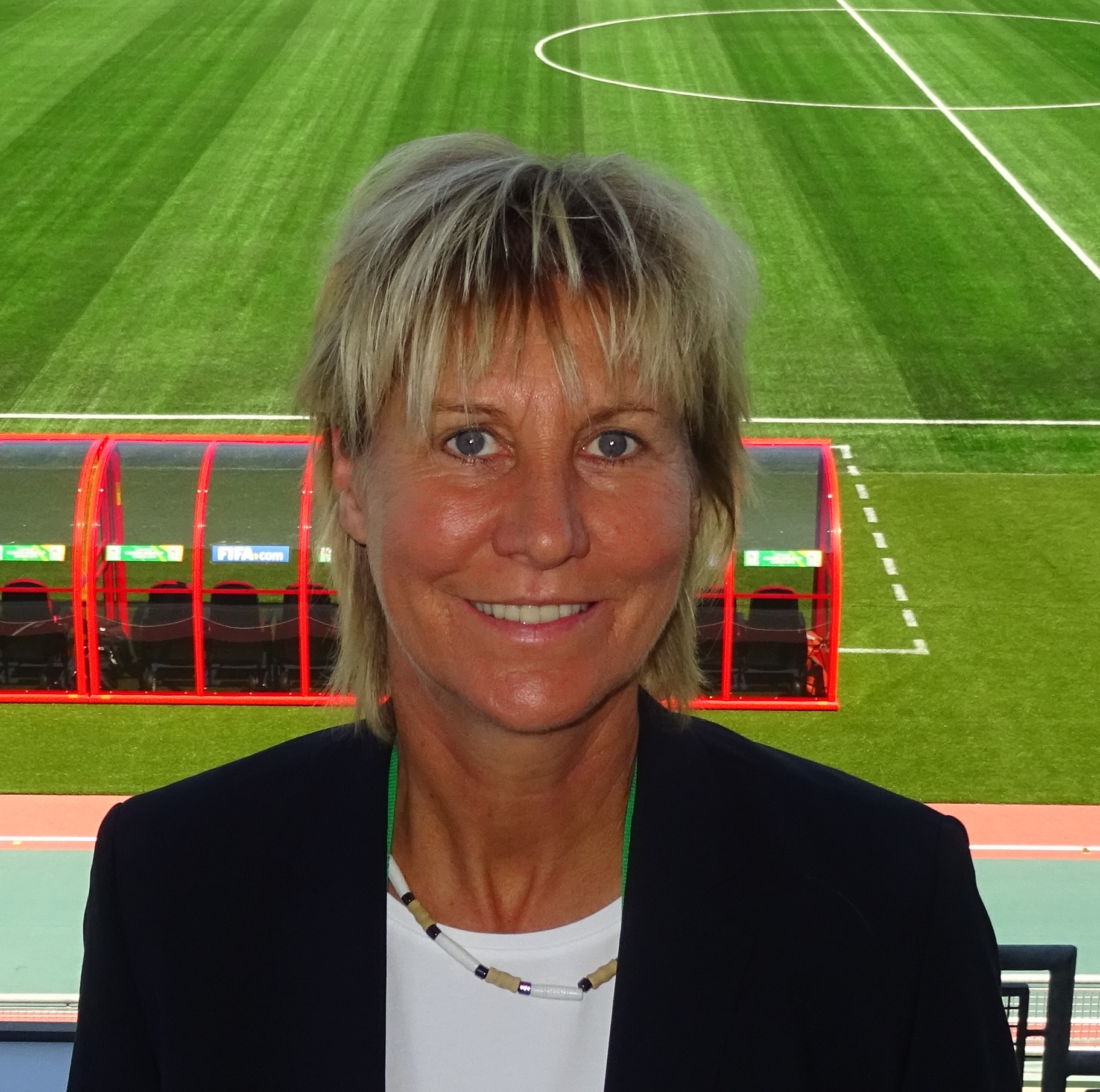

Personal information
- Date of birth: 11 January 1962 (age 64)
- Position: Midfielder

International career
Years	Team	Apps	(Gls)
1985	Germany	2	(0)

Margret Kratz (born 11 January 1962) is a German former footballer who played as a midfielder. She played in two matches for the Germany women's national football team in 1985. She was the manager of the Hungary women's national football team between 2021 and 2024.
