= MTK Budapest FC (women) =

MTK Hungária
- Full name: MTK Hungária FC
- Founded: 2002
- Ground: Hidegkuti Nándor Stadion
- Chairman: Tamás Deutsch
- Manager: András Cseh
- League: Női NB I
- 2025–26: 4th
- Website: http://www.mtkhungaria.hu
Home colours	Away colours

MTK Hungária FC women's football team represents MTK Hungária FC in Női NB I (Jet-Sol Liga), Hungary's premier women's league.

== Honours ==
- Hungarian Women's League: 7 (2005, 2010, 2011, 2012, 2013, 2014, 2017)
- Hungarian Women's Cup: 4 (2005, 2010, 2013, 2014)

=== UEFA Competitions record ===
Season	Competition	Stage	Result	Opponent
2005–06	UEFA Women's Cup	Qualifying Stage	2–2	(Greece) AE Aegina
2005–06	UEFA Women's Cup	Qualifying Stage	0–3	(Kazakhstan) Alma KTZh
2005–06	UEFA Women's Cup	Qualifying Stage	1–1	(Bulgaria) NSA Sofia
2010–11	Champions League	Round of 32	0–0, 1–7	(England) Everton LFC
2011–12	Champions League	Qualifying Stage	12–0	(Latvia) Liepājas Metalurgs
2011–12	Champions League	Qualifying Stage	0–1	(Israel) ASA Tel Aviv
2011–12	Champions League	Qualifying Stage	0–0	(Portugal) 1º Dezembro
2012–13	Champions League	Qualifying Stage	5–0	(Latvia) Skonto/Ceriba
2012–13	Champions League	Qualifying Stage	7–0	(North Macedonia) Naše Taksi
2012–13	Champions League	Qualifying Stage	2–0	(Greece) PAOK
2012–13	Champions League	Round of 32	0–4, 1–6	(Sweden) LdB Malmö
2013–14	Champions League	Qualifying Stage	3–2	(Republic of Ireland) Raheny United
2013–14	Champions League	Qualifying Stage	2–0	(Northern Ireland) Newtownabbey
2013–14	Champions League	Qualifying Stage	1–0	(Ukraine) Kharkiv
2013–14	Champions League	Round of 32	0–5, 0–6	(Germany) Turbine Potsdam
2014–15	Champions League	Qualifying round	3–0	(Estonia) Pärnu JK
2014–15	Champions League	Qualifying round	1–0	(Montenegro) ŽFK Ekonomist
2014–15	Champions League	Qualifying round	2–1	(Slovenia) ŽNK Pomurje
2014–15	Champions League	Round of 32	1–2, 2–2 (a.e.t.)	(Austria) SV Neulengbach
2017–18	Champions League	Qualifying round	2–0	(Kosovo) Hajvalia
2017–18	Champions League	Qualifying round	0–2	(Portugal) Sporting CP
2017–18	Champions League	Qualifying round	0–3	(Kazakhstan) BIIK Kazygurt

== Current squad ==
As of 29 November 2024

Note: Flags indicate national team as defined under FIFA eligibility rules; some limited exceptions apply. Players may hold more than one non-FIFA nationality.

No.	Pos.	Nation	Player
1	GK	HUN	Gabriella Vadvirág Rónyai
4	DF	SRB	Oršoja Vajda
5	MF	HUN	Rebeka Tenyei-Tóth
6	MF	HUN	Edina Farádi-Szabó
7	MF	HUN	Melissza Szabó
9	DF	HUN	Henrietta László
10	FW	HUN	Bernadett Zágor
11	FW	HUN	Viktória Murár
12	MF	HUN	Panna Farkas
13	GK	HUN	Luca Varga
14	MF	HUN	Bernadett Barkóczi
15	MF	HUN	Lilien Borzák

No.	Pos.	Nation	Player
16	MF	HUN	Bernadett Stefán
17	FW	HUN	Lora Legendás
18	DF	HUN	Anita Pinczi (captain)
18	MF	HUN	Cecilia Mészáros
19	DF	GRE	Maria Palama
22	DF	HUN	Vivien Tagyi
23	FW	HUN	Fanny Vágó
24	FW	HUN	Hajna Vas
33	MF	GRE	Chrysanthi Voila
44	DF	SRB	Georgina Pataki
66	MF	HUN	Blanka Bokor
77	FW	HUN	Kinga Siklér
79	FW	HUN	Adelina Molnár
88	MF	HUN	Zoé Magyarics
99	GK	HUN	Evelin Erős

=== Former players ===
- (Hungary) Henrietta Csiszár, Fanny Vágó, Anita Pádár, Zsanett Jakabfi, Zsanett Kaján
