= Hungarian Women's Cup =

Magyar női labdarúgókupa
- Founded: 1992
- Region: Hungary
- Teams: 24
- Current champions: Ferencváros (7th title)
- Most championships: Ferencváros (7 titles)

The Hungarian Women's Cup is the annual cup competition of women's football teams in Hungary. It was first contested in 1993.

== List of finals ==
The list of finals:

Season	Champion	Result	Runner-up	Ref.
1993	Renova		Pécsi Fortuna	
1994	not played			
1995	Pécsi Fortuna	4–1	Szegedi Boszorkányok	
1996	Femina	2–0	László Kórház	
1997	Pécsi Fortuna	5–0	FC Eger	
1998	László Kórház	1–1 (3–1 pen.)	Renova	
1999	László Kórház	6–1	Renova	
2000	László Kórház	2–0	Femina	
2001	Renova	4–2	FC Eger	
2002	Renova	4–2	Femina	
2003	László Kórház	3–3 (3–0 pen.)	MTK Hungária	
2004	László Kórház	4–1	Íris SC	
2005	MTK Budapest	4–0	László Kórház	
2006	not played			
2007	not played			
2008	Viktória FC-Szombathely	3–2	MTK Hungária	
2009	Viktória FC-Szombathely	2–1	Gyõri Dózsa	
2010	MTK Hungária	2–0	Ferencváros	
2011	Viktória FC-Szombathely	1–0	MTK Hungária	
2012	Astra Hungary FC	2–1	Viktória FC-Szombathely	
2013	MTK Hungária	2–0	Astra Hungary FC	
2014	MTK Hungária	4–3	Ferencváros	
2015	Ferencváros	1–1 (5–4 pen.)	MTK Hungária	
2016	Ferencváros	5–0	Budapest Honvéd	
2017	Ferencváros	6–0	ETO FC Győr	
2018	Ferencváros	3–1	Diósgyőri VTK	
2019	Ferencváros	4–3	Diósgyőri VTK	
2020	not completed			
2021	Ferencváros	5–1	Astra (Üllő)	
2022	Győri ETO	1–0	Haladás Viktória	
2023	Győri ETO	4–1	Puskás Akadémia	
2024	Győri ETO	4–3 (3–2 pen.)	MTK Budapest	
2025	Győri ETO	3–1	MTK Budapest	
2026	Ferencváros	3–0	Budapest Honvéd	

=== Performance by club ===
Club	Winners	Winning years
Ferencváros	7	2015, 2016, 2017, 2018, 2019, 2021, 2026
László Kórház	5	1998, 1999, 2000, 2003, 2004
Győri ETO	4	2022, 2023, 2024, 2025
MTK Hungária	4	2005, 2010, 2013, 2014
Renova	3	1993, 2001, 2002
Viktória FC-Szombathely	3	2008, 2009, 2011
Pécsi Fortuna	2	2005, 2007
Femina	1	1996
Astra Hungary FC	1	2012
