= 1. FC Femina =

Femina
- Full name: 1. Football Club Femina
- Founded: 1970 (August 19)
- Ground: Laszló Budai II Stadium, Budapest
- Capacity: 7,500
- Chairman: Béla Halmosi
- Manager: István Herczku
- League: First Division
- 2012–13: 5th
Home colours	Away colours

1. FC Femina is a Hungarian women's football team competing in the Hungarian First Division.

Founded in 1970, Femina is the most successful team in the championship with 10 titles between 1988 and 2008, including two three-year winning streaks in 2000–03 and 2005–08. The following two seasons marked a decline with the club's worst rankings yet, while in 2011 Femina was 3rd. Femina has been less successful in the national Cup, with just one title to make a double in 1996.

Femina was the first team to represent Hungary in the UEFA Women's Cup. Its major success in its six appearances so far was reaching the last 16 in 2007.

== Former players ==
- (Hungary) Cecília Gáspár

== Honours ==
- 10 Hungarian Leagues: 1988, 1991, 1996, 1997, 2001, 2002, 2003, 2006, 2007, 2008
- 1 Hungarian Cup: 1996

Other league results
Position	Years
2	1989, 1995, 1999, 2000
3	1985, 1986, 1987, 1990, 1992, 1993, 1993, 1998, 2005, 2011
4	2004
5	2009
6	2010

=== Record in European competitions ===
Season	Competition	Stage	Result	Opponent
2001–02	UEFA Women's Cup	Group stage	4–0	(Bulgaria) Grand Hotel Varna
			0–1	(Czech Republic) Sparta Prague
			0–6	(Sweden) Umeå
2002–03	UEFA Women's Cup	Group stage	0–1	(France) Toulouse
			4–0	(Israel) Maccabi Haifa
			2–5	(Italy) Lazio
2003–04	UEFA Women's Cup	Group stage	0–11	(Russia) Energiya Voronezh
			3–3	(Croatia) Osijek
			0–4	(Italy) Foroni Verona
2006–07	UEFA Women's Cup	Qualifying Stage	7–1	(Azerbaijan) Gömrükçü Baku
			1–0	(Bulgaria) NSA Sofia
			7–0	(Moldova) Narta Chişinău
		Group stage	1–5	(Denmark) Brøndby
			0–6	(England) Arsenal
			2–4	(Russia) Rossiyanka
2007–08	UEFA Women's Cup	Qualifying Stage	6–0	(Azerbaijan) Ruslan
			2–0	(Moldova) Narta Chişinău
			1–3	(Kazakhstan) Almaty
2008–09	UEFA Women's Cup	Qualifying Stage	3–1	(Faroe Islands) KÍ
			0–2	(Lithuania) Gintra Universitetas
			0–1	(Russia) Zvezda Perm
