= Női Nemzeti Bajnokság I =

Simple Női Liga
- Founded: 1984; 42 years ago
- Country: Hungary
- Confederation: UEFA
- Number of clubs: 12
- Level on pyramid: 1
- Relegation to: Női NB II
- Domestic cup: Hungarian Women's Cup
- International cup: UEFA Champions League
- Current champions: Ferencváros (9th title) (2025–26)
- Most championships: Femina (10 titles)
- Broadcaster: M4 Sport
- Website: noifutball.mlsz.hu
- Current: 2026–27 Női NB I

The Női NB I (Hungarian: Női Nemzeti Bajnokság, for "Women's National Championship"), also known as the Simple Női Liga for sponsorship reasons, the top level of league competition for women's association football in Hungary. Organized by the Hungarian Football Federation, it features twelve teams. The champion qualifies for a spot in the UEFA Women's Champions League.

== Format ==
From 2007–08 to 2009–10 eight teams played two double round-robins (so 28 matches) to decide the champion.

For the 2010–11 season the league was extended to ten teams and a playoff system was adopted. After the regular season, which was reduced to a double round-robin tournament, the top 5 teams qualified for the championship playoff. At the start of the playoff the results against the teams failing to reach the championship playoff are subtracted. The five teams then play another double round-robin (for 8 additional matches) to crown the champion. The relegation playoff round works in the same way with the bottom five placed teams after the regular season.

Since the 2014–15 season, the top two teams after the championship play-off play a championship final.

== Infrastructure and Stadiums ==
Teams in the Hungarian top flight operate under modern, professional conditions. The majority of the clubs function as the women's departments of established men's NB I (first division) or NB II (second division) sports organizations, which guarantees high-level infrastructural support.

- Pitches and Stadiums: Matches are played in modern, UEFA-licensed stadiums or elite academy complexes. For example, Ferencváros hosts matches at the Kocsis Sándor Sports Center or the Groupama Aréna, while Puskás Akadémia plays at the Pancho Aréna.
- Training Facilities: Players train on heated natural grass and latest-generation artificial turf pitches. Club facilities feature professional gyms and advanced recovery centers equipped with cryotherapy, saunas, and plunge pools.

== International Integration and Foreign Talent ==
The Simple Női Liga attracts international players from North America, South America, and Europe, raising the league's tactical and physical standards. Furthermore, the reigning champion regularly competes in the UEFA Women's Champions League, providing a reference point to measure the league's development against top-tier European clubs.

== Champions ==
Below is a list of league champions and top scorers.

Season	Champion	Runner-up	Third place	Top scorer (club)	Goals
1983–84	Renova Spartacus	Femina	László Kórház		
1984–85	László Kórház	Renova Spartacus	Femina	Edit Kern (Renova)	
1985–86	László Kórház	Renova Spartacus	Femina	Edit Kern (Renova)	
1986–87	László Kórház	Renova Spartacus	Femina	Edit Kern (Renova)	
1987–88	Femina	Renova Spartacus	László Kórház	Edit Kern (Renova)	
1988–89	László Kórház	Femina	Renova Spartacus		
1989–90	Renova Spartacus	Femina	László Kórház		
1990–91	Femina	Renova Spartacus	László Kórház	Ibolya Vrábel (Femina)	36
1991–92	Renova Spartacus	László Kórház	Femina	Katalin Bökk (Femina)	24
1992–93	Renova Spartacus	László Kórház	Femina	Éva Szarka (László Kórház)	27
1993–94	László Kórház	Renova Spartacus	Femina	Beáta Fülöp (Renova)	27
1994–95	László Kórház	Femina	Pécsi Fortuna	Ilona Szabó (Eger)	26
1995–96	Femina	Renova Spartacus	László Kórház	Szilvia Ruff (László Kórház)	27
1996–97	Femina	Renova Spartacus	Pécsi Fortuna	Anett Nagy (Femina)	25
1997–98	László Kórház	Renova Spartacus	Femina	Szilvia Ruff (Renova)	30
1998–99	László Kórház	Íris-Hungaro-Kábel	Femina	Anita Pádár (László Kórház)	21
1999–2000	László Kórház	Femina	Renova Spartacus	Anita Pádár (László Kórház)	22
2000–01	Femina	Renova Spartacus	Viktória	Anita Pádár (Renova)	23
2001–02	Femina	Renova Spartacus	Viktória	Anita Pádár (Femina)	24
2002–03	Femina	László Kórház	Viktória	Anita Pádár (Femina)	22
2003–04	Viktória	MTK Hungária	László Kórház	Anita Pádár (Femina)	31
2004–05	MTK Hungária	Viktória	Femina	Anita Pádár (Femina)	27
2005–06	Femina	MTK Hungária	Viktória	Anita Pádár (Femina)	34
2006–07	Femina	Viktória	MTK Hungária	Anita Pádár (Femina)	29
2007–08	Femina	Viktória	MTK Hungária	Anita Pádár (Femina)	53
2008–09	Viktória	MTK Hungária	Ferencváros	Anita Pádár (Femina)	44
2009–10	MTK Hungária	Viktória	Győri Dózsa	Anita Pádár (Femina)	38
2010–11	MTK Hungária	Viktória	Taksony	Anita Pádár (Femina)	35
2011–12	MTK Hungária	Viktória	Astra Hungary	Anita Pádár (Femina / MTK Hungária)	57
2012–13	MTK Hungária	Astra Hungary	Viktória	Anita Pádár (MTK Hungária)	55
2013–14	MTK Hungária	Astra Hungary	Ferencváros	Anita Pádár (MTK Hungária)	28
2014–15	Ferencváros	MTK Hungária	Dorogi Egyetértés	Anita Pádár (MTK Hungária)	24
2015–16	Ferencváros	MTK Hungária	Viktória	Slađana Bulatović (Ferencváros)	30
2016–17	MTK Hungária	Ferencváros	Viktória	Ebere Orji (Ferencváros)	27
2017–18	MTK Hungária	Ferencváros	Diósgyőri VTK	Lilla Sipos (Győri ETO)	19
2018–19	Ferencváros	MTK Hungária	Diósgyőri VTK	Biljana Bradić (Diósgyőri VTK)	25
2019–20	Season abandoned due to the COVID-19 pandemic.				
2020–21	Ferencváros	MTK Hungária	Astra Hungary	Fanny Vágó (Ferencváros)	26
2021–22	Ferencváros	ETO Győr	MTK Hungária	Fanny Vágó (Ferencváros)	17
2022–23	Ferencváros	ETO Győr	MTK Hungária	Fanny Vágó (Ferencváros)	27
2023–24	Ferencváros	ETO Győr	MTK Hungária	Fanni Vachter (ETO Győr)	29
2024–25	Ferencváros	ETO Győr	MTK Hungária	Fanny Vágó (MTK Hungária)	18
2025–26	Ferencváros	Puskás Akadémia	ETO Győr	Vanessza Nagy (Ferencváros)	32

== Most titles ==
Below is a ranking of the clubs by most titles won.

Club	Titles	Winning seasons
1. FC Femina	10	1987–88, 1990–91, 1995–96, 1996–97, 2000–01, 2001–02, 2002–03, 2005–06, 2006–07, 2007–08
László Kórház SC	9	1984–85, 1985–86, 1986–87, 1988–89, 1993–94, 1994–95, 1997–98, 1998–99, 1999–2000
Ferencvárosi TC	9	2014–15, 2015–16, 2018–19, 2020–21, 2021–22, 2022–23, 2023–24, 2024–25, 2025–26
MTK Hungária FC	8	2004–05, 2009–10, 2010–11, 2011–12, 2012–13, 2013–14, 2016–17, 2017–18
Renova FC	4	1983–84, 1989–90, 1991–92, 1992–93
Viktória FC	2	2003–04, 2008–09
