= Ferencvárosi TC (women's football) =

Hungarian football club

- Full name: Ferencvárosi Torna Club
- Nicknames: Ferencváros, FTC and Fradi, Zöld Sasok (Green Eagles) zöld-fehérek (The green and whites)
- Short name: FTC
- Founded: August 2004; 22 years ago
- Ground: Sándor Kocsis Sports Center, Kőbánya
- Capacity: 5,000
- President: Gábor Kubatov
- Head coach: Flórián Albert Jr.
- League: Női NB I
- 2025–26: Női NB I, 1st of 8 (champions)
- Website: https://www.fradi.hu/labdarugas/noi-csapat/hirek
Home colours	Away colours	Third colours

Ferencvárosi Torna Club, known as Ferencváros (Hungarian: [ˈfɛrɛnt͡svaːroʃ]), Fradi, or simply FTC - Ferencvárosi Torna Club, is a professional football club based in Ferencváros, Budapest, Hungary, that competes in the Női NB I, the top flight of Hungarian women's football. Founded in 2004, it is the women's football section of the multisport club Ferencvárosi TC.

The club became national champions for the first time in 2014–15, dethroning rivals MTK Hungária who had won the previous five successive Női NB I titles.

The club previously had partnerships with professional clubs Kóka KSK and Kelen SC to act as second and third teams respectively. Kóka had a roster of players who were all under the age of 17 while playing in the Női NB I and NB II leagues.

== Honours ==
- Női NB I
  - Winners (9): 2014–2015, 2015–2016, 2018–2019, 2020–2021, 2021–2022, 2022–23, 2023–24, 2024–25, 2025–26
- Hungarian Women's Cup
  - Winners (6): 2015, 2016, 2017, 2018, 2019, 2021

=== UEFA Competitions record ===
Season	Competition	Stage	Result	Opponent
2015–16	UEFA Women's Champions League	Qualifying Stage	0–2	(Netherlands) FC Twente
2015–16	UEFA Women's Champions League	Qualifying Stage	2–1	(Israel) ASA Tel Aviv
2015–16	UEFA Women's Champions League	Qualifying Stage	11–0	(Luxembourg) Jeunesse Junglinster
2016–17	UEFA Women's Champions League	Qualifying Stage	1–2	(Netherlands) FC Twente
2016–17	UEFA Women's Champions League	Qualifying Stage	2–0	(Turkey) Konak Belediyespor
2016–17	UEFA Women's Champions League	Qualifying Stage	4–0	(Malta) Hibernians
2019–20	UEFA Women's Champions League	Qualifying Stage	3–1	(Slovakia) Slovan Bratislava
2019–20	UEFA Women's Champions League	Qualifying Stage	2–0	(Moldova) Agarista-ȘS Anenii Noi
2019–20	UEFA Women's Champions League	Qualifying Stage	2–2	(Serbia) Spartak Subotica
2020–21	UEFA Women's Champions League	Qualifying Stage	6–1	Racing FC Union Luxembourg
2020–21	UEFA Women's Champions League	Qualifying Stage	1–4	(Slovenia) ŽNK Pomurje
2021–22	UEFA Women's Champions League	Qualifying Stage	2–1	(Poland) Czarni Sosnowiec
2021–22	UEFA Women's Champions League	Qualifying Stage	0–0 (a.e.t.) (lost 3–1 on penalties)	(Albania) Vllaznia Shkodër
2022–23	UEFA Women's Champions League	Qualifying Stage	1–2	(Scotland) Rangers
2022–23	UEFA Women's Champions League	Qualifying Stage	7–0	(Wales) Swansea City
2025–26	UEFA Women's Champions League	Second qualifying round	3–0	(Luxembourg) Racing Union
2025–26	UEFA Women's Champions League	Second qualifying round	4–0	(Belarus) Dinamo Minsk
2025–26	UEFA Women's Champions League	Third qualifying round	0–3 (away)	(Norway) Vålerenga
2025–26	UEFA Women's Champions League	Third qualifying round	1–2 (home)	(Norway) Vålerenga
2025–26	UEFA Women's Europa Cup	Second qualifying round	0–0 (away)	(Czech Republic) Sparta Prague
2025–26	UEFA Women's Europa Cup	Second qualifying round	0–5 (home)	(Czech Republic) Sparta Prague
2026–27	UEFA Women's Champions League	Qualifying Stage	2–3 (a.e.t.)	(Greece) PAOK
2026–27	UEFA Women's Champions League	Qualifying Stage	8 Aug	(Kosovo) Mitrovica

== Current squad ==
As of 4 July 2026

Note: Flags indicate national team as defined under FIFA eligibility rules; some limited exceptions apply. Players may hold more than one non-FIFA nationality.

No.	Pos.	Nation	Player
1	GK	SRB	Milica Kostić
3	MF	HUN	Vanda Hanász
4	DF	HUN	Anna Túróczy
5	DF	HUN	Brigitta Gődér
6	DF	SRB	Andjela Frajtović
7	MF	HUN	Barbara Zágonyi
10	FW	HUN	Fanni Diószegi
11	MF	ARG	Milagros Díaz
14	MF	HUN	Evelin Fenyvesi (captain)
18	FW	HUN	Eszter Czinege
20	DF	HUN	Eszter Ott
21	GK	HUN	Janka Major
22	GK	HUN	Luca Barti

No.	Pos.	Nation	Player
23	DF	HUN	Adél Németh
24	FW	PER	Alesia García
27	FW	USA	Jadyn Edwards
25	MF	HUN	Viktória Nagy
32	FW	HUN	Petra Gégény
33	MF	HUN	Eszter Kovács
45	DF	HUN	Linett Bozsik
58	FW	EST	Vlada Kubassova
88	MF	HUN	Dorottya Czellér
—	DF	HUN	Petra Nyúl
—	DF	HUN	Zille Gágyor
—	MF	HUN	Petra Kovács
