= Chris Gunter =

Welsh footballer (born 1989)

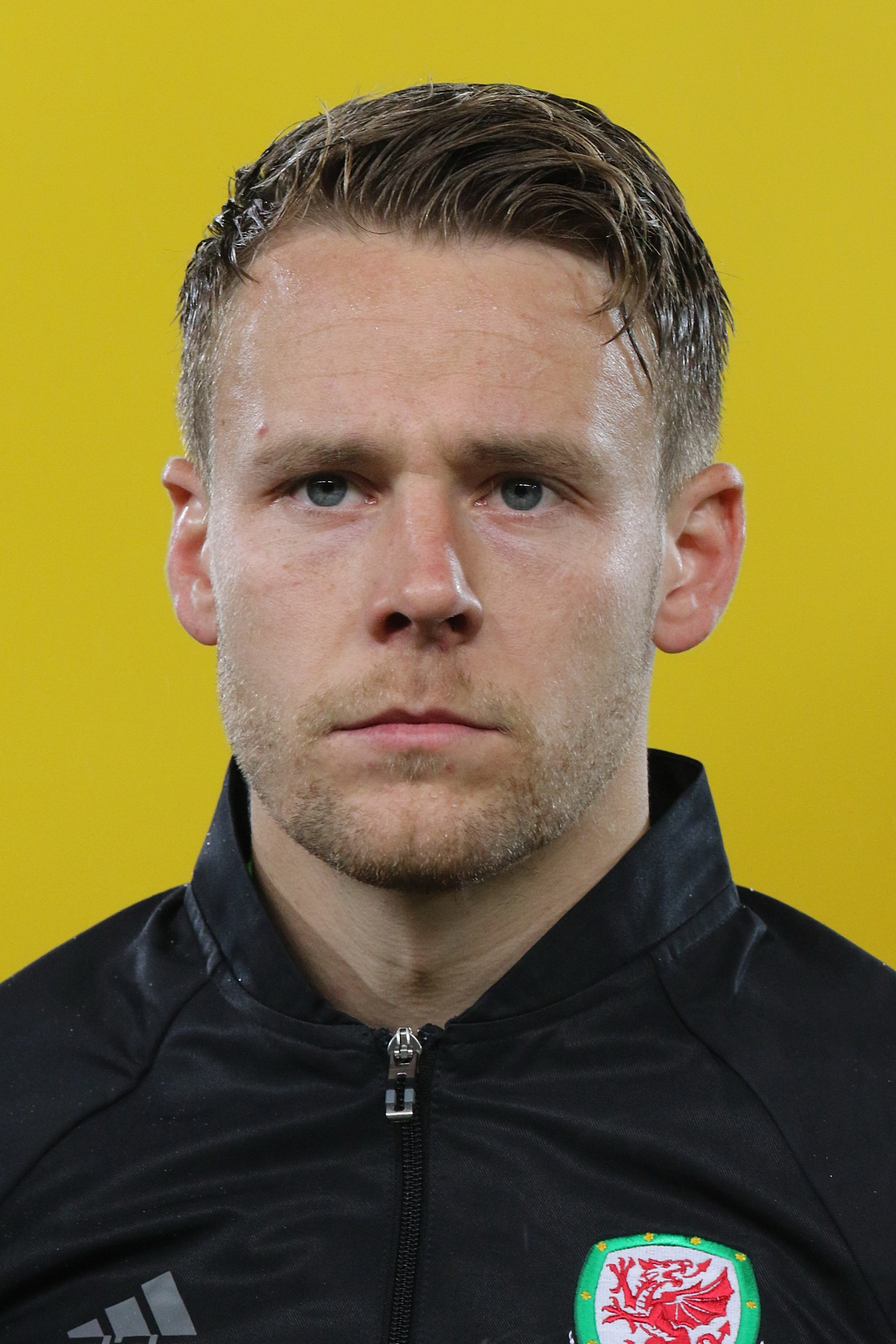
- Gunter with Wales in 2016

Personal information
- Full name: Christopher Ross Gunter
- Date of birth: 21 July 1989 (age 37)
- Place of birth: Newport, Wales
- Height: 5 ft 11 in (1.80 m)
- Position: Defender

Team information
- Current team: Wales U19 (head coach) & Oxford United (assistant manager)

Youth career
- 1997–2006: Cardiff City

Senior career*
Years	Team	Apps	(Gls)
2006–2008	Cardiff City	28	(0)
2008–2009	Tottenham Hotspur	5	(0)
2009	→ Nottingham Forest (loan)	8	(0)
2009–2012	Nottingham Forest	133	(2)
2012–2020	Reading	280	(2)
2020–2022	Charlton Athletic	54	(1)
2022–2023	AFC Wimbledon	31	(0)
Total		539	(5)

International career^{‡}
2005–2006	Wales U17	11	(2)
2006	Wales U19	3	(0)
2006–2007	Wales U21	8	(0)
2007–2022	Wales	109	(0)

Managerial career
- 2024–: Wales U19
Medal record
Men's football
Representing Wales (as player)
UEFA European Championship
Bronze medal – third place	2016 France
- * Club domestic league appearances and goals as of 10:39, 9 May 2023 (UTC) ‡ National team caps and goals as of 19:46, 21 March 2023 (UTC)

Christopher Ross Gunter (born 21 July 1989) is a Welsh former professional footballer who played as a defender. An attacking full back, he was capable of playing on both flanks but usually played on his preferred right side. He has been a coach for Oxford United since 2026.

He joined Cardiff City's youth system and was signed by Premier League club Tottenham Hotspur for £4 million in January 2008. Rarely used at Tottenham, he returned to the Championship with Nottingham Forest, initially on loan, before joining Reading in 2012. He made 314 appearances for Reading before being released in 2020 and moving to Charlton Athletic and AFC Wimbledon.

Gunter was a Welsh international since under-17 level and holds the record as the second youngest debutant for the under-21 team. He made his full international debut in 2007, earning 109 caps in a 15-year international career. He was part of the Wales squad that reached the semi-finals at UEFA Euro 2016, also featuring at Euro 2020 and in the 2022 World Cup squad. In 2017 he was named Welsh Footballer of the Year. He beat Neville Southall's record of 92 caps in 2018, and in 2021 became the first Welshman to earn 100 caps.

== Early life ==
Gunter was born in Newport to Gerald and Sarah Gunter. As a youngster, he attended Durham Road Junior School before moving on to St Julian's High School as a teenager. He and his brother Marc support Cardiff City, beginning to follow the club from the age of nine, and he continued to go to away games that did not clash with his own youth team fixtures on supporters' coaches until 2006. Gunter also holds a BTEC National Diploma in Sports Studies.

== Club career ==
=== Cardiff City ===
Gunter started his career as a striker when he played for local youth sides Durham Colts and Albion Rovers in Newport but switched to playing as a full back at a young age and signed for the Cardiff City youth side at the age of eight. He signed his first professional contract with the club on 1 August 2006 along with fellow Cardiff academy graduate Darcy Blake.

Primarily a right-sided defender, Gunter made his senior debut for Cardiff on 22 August 2006 against Barnet in the League Cup first round, playing the full 90 minutes of a 2–0 loss at Ninian Park. After being included in the first team squad on several occasions, his league debut came in a 1–0 home loss to Queens Park Rangers on 17 November 2006. Gunter was praised for his performance by manager Dave Jones, who commented "Chris did the right things, let nobody down, and will only get stronger." Gunter would later describe his second league appearance, a 4–1 defeat to Hull City, as one of the lowest points of his career. However, he was able to maintain his place in the squad, competing with Kevin McNaughton and Kerrea Gilbert.

In March 2007 he won the Football League's Apprentice of the Year award after impressing in the first team squad due to injuries to some regular players and during the summer of 2007, Gunter was the subject of two bids of £500,000 and £1 million from Premier League club Everton. Both, however, were rejected. At the end of the 2006–07 season, having made sixteen appearances in all competitions, he became Cardiff's youngest player to win a senior international cap after making his debut, beating the 48 year old club record held by Graham Moore.

=== Tottenham Hotspur ===
According to reports on 21 December 2007, Cardiff agreed a substantial fee with Tottenham Hotspur and therefore allowed Gunter to enter into talks with the club. Cardiff also stated that Tottenham had "met their valuation of the player" which had previously been reported at £4 million. On 22 December Gunter passed a medical at White Hart Lane with a view to a £2 million move. The move was made official on 24 December and he joined the club after the transfer window opened on 1 January 2008.

Gunter made his debut for Spurs on 15 January in an FA Cup third round tie against Reading at the Madejski Stadium, playing the entirety of a 1–0 victory. Fifteen days later, he made his top-flight debut for Spurs, playing 62 minutes of a goalless draw at Everton before being replaced by Kevin-Prince Boateng. He made only one more league appearance that season, filling in for Didier Zokora for the final 17 minutes of a 4–1 loss at Birmingham City on 1 March. He was cup-tied for their win in the 2008 Football League Cup Final.

His second season did not see him become a regular, as he featured in only three league matches, playing the full 90 minutes in none of them. On 12 March 2009, Gunter moved on loan to Nottingham Forest for the rest of the 2008–09 season.

=== Nottingham Forest ===
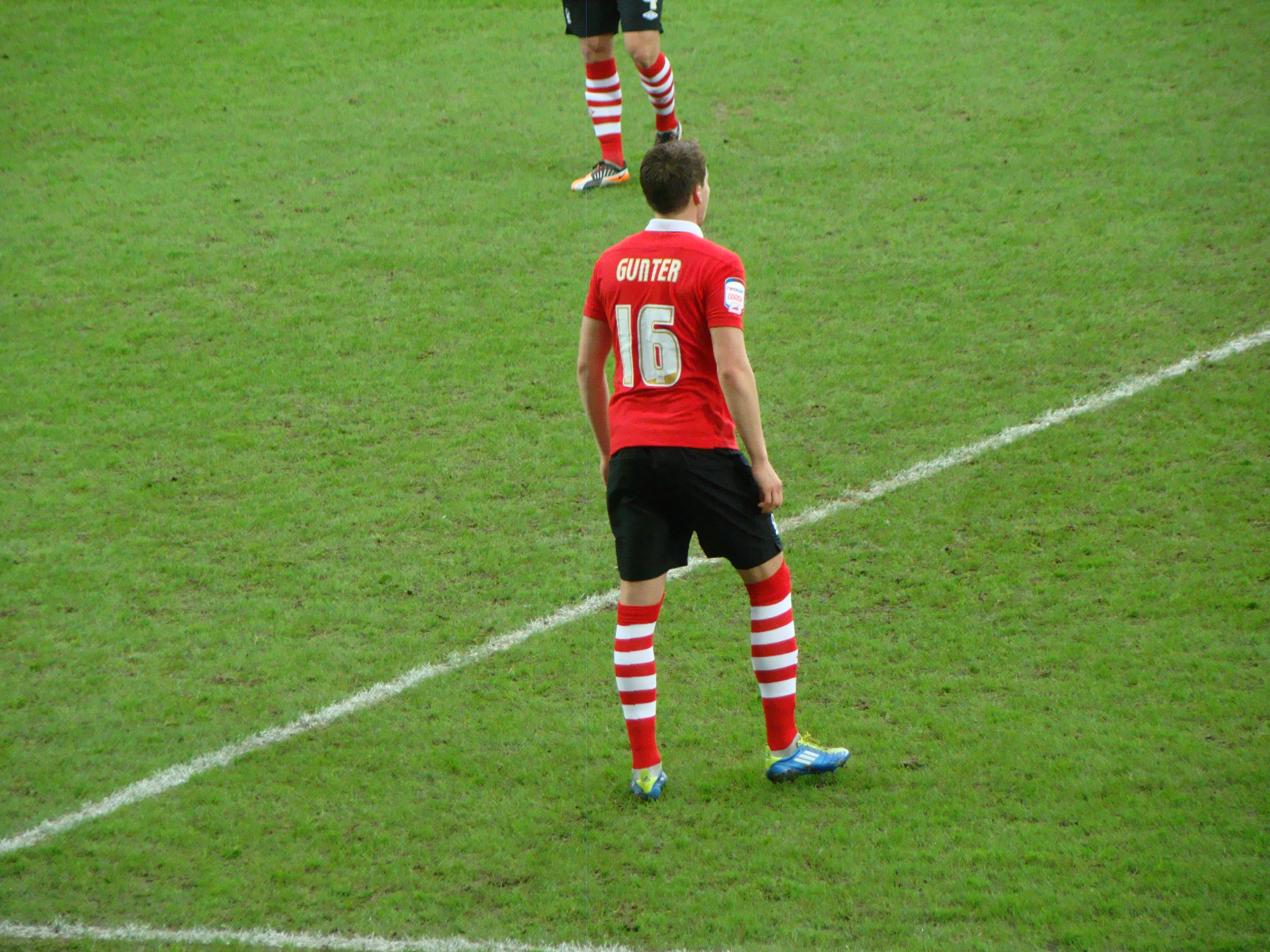
Gunter playing for Nottingham Forest in 2011

On 17 July 2009, Tottenham Hotspur accepted a bid of £1.75 million from Nottingham Forest. Forest completed the signing of Gunter on 20 July on a four-year contract. He scored his first goal for the club in a 1–0 victory at Plymouth Argyle on 27 September 2009. It was also Gunter's first goal in senior football. In the match between Nottingham Forest and Crystal Palace on 23 March 2010, Gunter made his 100th senior club appearance. In May 2010, he was selected in the Championship PFA Team of the Year for the 2009–10 season.

On 15 August 2010, Gunter and Sanchez Watt were booked by referee Tony Bates for an on-field altercation; however later that month the FA retrospectively gave Gunter a three-match ban when replays showed him stamping on the Leeds United player.

A regular at right-back during his time at Forest, Gunter scored his only other goal for the club on 16 August 2011, the only goal of a match at Doncaster Rovers.

=== Reading ===
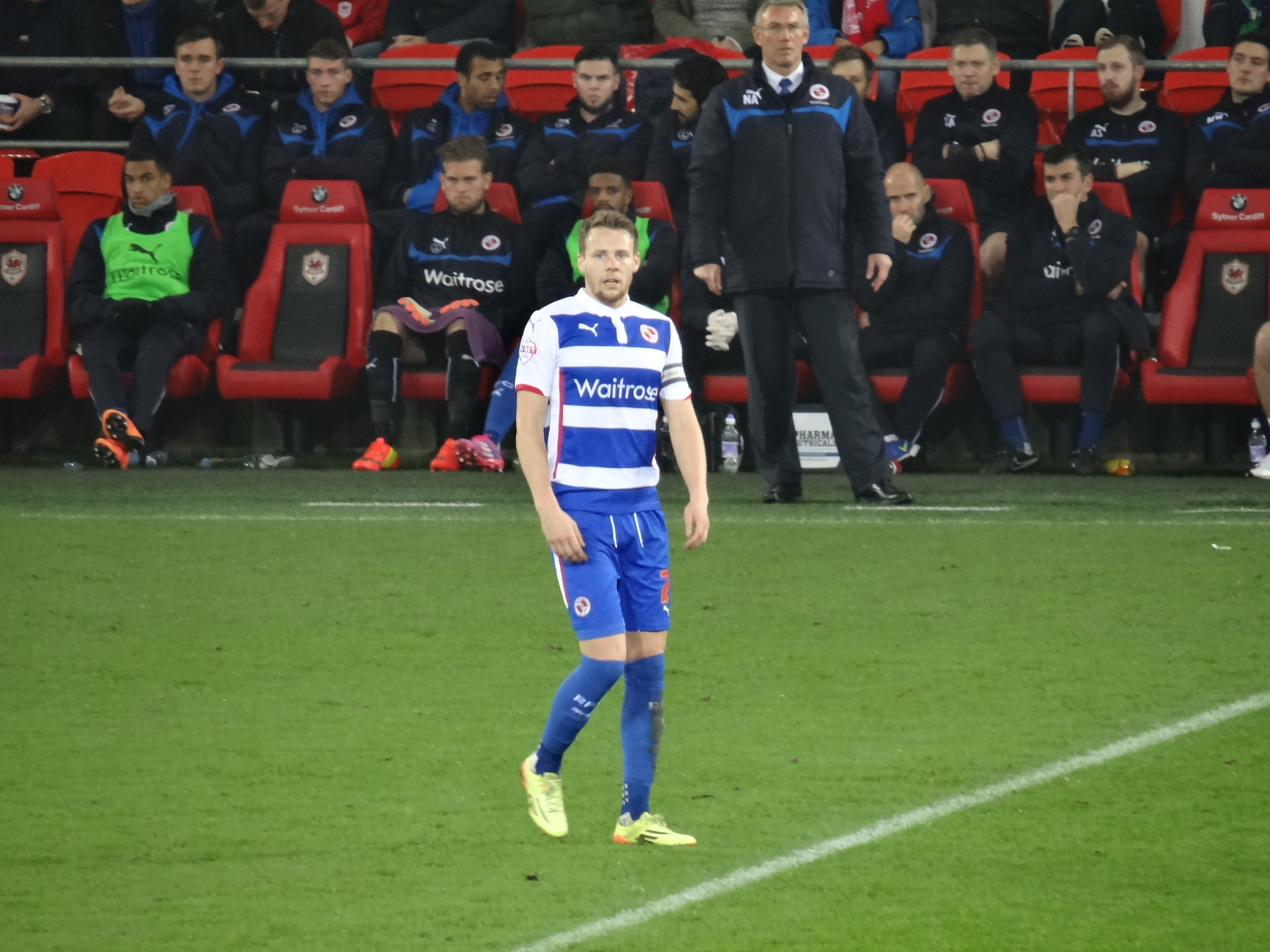
Gunter playing for Reading in 2014

Gunter completed a move to Reading on 17 July 2012, signing a three-year deal for the club who had been promoted to the Premier League. The fee was undisclosed but has been reported to have been between £2.3 million and £2.5 million. He scored his first goal for Reading against Peterborough United in the League Cup on 28 August 2012, the 3–2 home victory putting the team into the third round. He played 20 league matches for the Royals, who ended the season relegated. On 29 November 2013, Gunter was sent off as Reading won 3–2 at his former club Forest.

On 27 March 2015, Reading took up the option in Gunter's contract to extend his stay with the Royals for an additional year. In the League Cup first round on 11 August, he scored the extra-time only goal as Reading won away at Colchester United.

On 18 February 2016, Gunter signed a new two-year contract to keep him at Reading until the summer of 2018. Gunter again extended his contract with Reading on 5 July 2017, agreeing a new three-year contract, keeping him at the club until the summer of 2020. In October 2017, Gunter was named Welsh Footballer of the Year by the Football Association of Wales.

In the 2018–19 season, a combination of the arrivals of Andy Yiadom and manager José Manuel Gomes saw Gunter's first-team opportunities limited – the first time since his arrival at the club that he faced prolonged spells out of the side. A combination of these factors, and injury, limited him to 22 league appearances across the season.

After Gomes' departure from Reading on 9 October 2019, Gunter and Garath McCleary were recalled to the first team. Both players had been transfer listed and told they would be leaving the club in the previous summer. It was not until 26 November that he made his first appearance of the season, making his 500th career appearance in club football in 1–0 home defeat to Leeds United – also his 225th league start for Reading. On 1 January 2020, profiting from Yiadom's injury, he made his 300th appearance for Reading in a 2–1 win at Fulham. Gunter was released by Reading in July 2020 at the completion of his contract.

=== Charlton Athletic ===
On 8 October 2020, Gunter joined Charlton Athletic on a two-year deal. He scored his only goal for Charlton in a 2–2 draw against Plymouth Argyle on 26 December 2020.

On 10 May 2022, it was confirmed that Gunter would leave Charlton Athletic when his contract expired.

=== AFC Wimbledon ===
On 4 July 2022, Gunter rejoined his former manager Johnnie Jackson by signing for AFC Wimbledon on a one-year deal. He made his debut in EFL League Two on 30 July in a 2–0 home win over Gillingham. In his fourth game on 16 August he was sent off just before half time at Mansfield Town for grabbing the throat of Stephen Quinn, who had kicked the ball at his face while he was on the ground; the score was 2–2 at the time and the final result was a 5–2 win for the hosts. His three-game ban was rescinded on appeal.

Gunter missed two games in March 2023 due to his new commitment to coaching the Wales national team; the decision was endorsed by Jackson. On 4 May, he announced his retirement after 35 games for AFC Wimbledon, and moved into a full-time coaching role for Wales.

== International career ==
=== Youth teams ===
Gunter started his Wales career during the 2003–04 season, making four appearances for the Schools' under-15 development squad before moving up to the Welsh Schools under-16 squad and played in a friendly against Republic of Ireland plus three Victory Shield internationals. He then made 11 appearances at Wales under-17 level during 2005–06, including captaining tue side, playing in two rounds of the UEFA Championships as Wales qualified from the opening group to reach the elite stage. His next step was playing for the Wales U19 squad in the Milk Cup.

At age 16 years and 299 days, Gunter became the second youngest player to play for the Wales Under-21 team behind Lewin Nyatanga when he played against Cyprus Under-21 in 2006.

=== Senior team ===
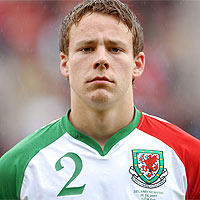
Gunter lining up for Wales in 2007

Gunter received his first call up to the senior international side at the age of seventeen for a friendly match against New Zealand at the end of his first season of professional football, describing himself as being "absolutely staggered". He made his debut for Wales in the match on 26 May 2007 at the Racecourse Ground, Wrexham, featuring for the first half of a 2–2 draw. He was ever present at right back during 2010 World Cup qualifying and was the only player in the squad to have played in all ten matches.

On 8 October 2010, Gunter received a straight red card in added time for a professional foul against Dimitar Rangelov in the 0–1 home loss against Bulgaria in a Euro 2012 qualifying match at the Cardiff City Stadium. Aged 24, he won his 50th cap for Wales in the 1–1 away draw with Belgium in 2014 FIFA World Cup qualification on 15 October 2013.

Gunter was part of Wales' UEFA Euro 2016 23-man squad and played every minute of their six games as they reached the semi-finals. He won his 75th cap, aged just 27 years, on 6 October 2016 in a 2–2 away draw against Austria in 2018 FIFA World Cup qualifying.

He captained the side for the first time for Wales' friendly with Panama on 13 November 2017, in which he equalled his former manager Gary Speed's record of 85 international caps for an outfield player. The following 22 March, Gunter made the record his own when he featured in a 6–0 win over China at the 2018 China Cup. On 20 November 2018, he surpassed Neville Southall's record of 92 caps for Wales in a 1–0 friendly loss away to Albania, in which he was captain for the second time. After the game, Southall tweeted: "Have a great night. Proud it was you who will now hold the record. Congratulations. Top player. Top guy. RESPECT"

Gunter became the first player to attain 100 caps for Wales in the 1–0 friendly win against Mexico on 27 March 2021. In May 2021 he was selected for the Wales squad for the delayed UEFA Euro 2020 tournament.

In November 2022, Gunter was named in the Wales squad for the 2022 FIFA World Cup in Qatar, but did not play any of their three Group B games. This allowed Gareth Bale, who started all three games, to overtake Gunter as the most-capped Wales player.

On 9 March 2023, Gunter confirmed he had retired from international football having earned 109 caps.

== Coaching career ==
On 21 March 2023, Gunter was appointed as one of the coaches to the Wales national football team under team manager Rob Page. He managed the Wales under-19s at the 2026 UEFA European Under-19 Championship.

In July 2026, he joined the coaching staff of Oxford United under new manager Aaron Ramsey. The following month, he was appointed manager of the Wales under-18s, a role he would undertake in addition to his duties with Oxford. In September 2026 Gunter stepped down from the Wales under-18 role.

== Personal life ==
Gunter is a former flatmate of fellow Welshman Aaron Ramsey who played for Arsenal, London rivals of Gunter's then team Tottenham Hotspur. Gunter was also best man for Ramsey at his wedding.

== Career statistics ==
=== Club ===
Appearances and goals by club, season and competition
Club	Season	League			FA Cup		League Cup		Continental		Other		Total	
Club	Season	Division	Apps	Goals	Apps	Goals	Apps	Goals	Apps	Goals	Apps	Goals	Apps	Goals
Cardiff City	2006–07	Championship	15	0	0	0	1	0	—		—		16	0
Cardiff City	2007–08	Championship	13	0	—		4	0	—		—		17	0
Cardiff City	Total		28	0	0	0	5	0	—		—		33	0
Tottenham Hotspur	2007–08	Premier League	2	0	2	0	—		—		—		4	0
Tottenham Hotspur	2008–09	Premier League	3	0	1	0	1	0	7 (Note: Appearances in UEFA Cup)	0	—		12	0
Tottenham Hotspur	Total		5	0	3	0	1	0	7	0	—		16	0
Nottingham Forest (loan)	2008–09	Championship	8	0	—		—		—		—		8	0
Nottingham Forest	2009–10	Championship	44	1	2	0	2	0	—		2 (Note: Appearances in Championship play-offs)	0	50	1
Nottingham Forest	2010–11	Championship	43	0	2	0	0	0	—		2	0	47	0
Nottingham Forest	2011–12	Championship	46	1	2	0	2	0	—		—		50	1
Nottingham Forest	Total		141	2	6	0	4	0	—		4	0	155	2
Reading	2012–13	Premier League	20	0	1	0	2	1	—		—		23	1
Reading	2013–14	Championship	44	0	1	0	1	0	—		—		46	0
Reading	2014–15	Championship	38	0	4	0	3	0	—		—		45	0
Reading	2015–16	Championship	44	0	5	0	3	1	—		—		52	1
Reading	2016–17	Championship	46	1	1	0	2	0	—		3	0	52	1
Reading	2017–18	Championship	46	1	3	0	3	0	—		—		52	1
Reading	2018–19	Championship	22	0	0	0	1	0	—		—		24	0
Reading	2019–20	Championship	20	0	1	0	0	0	—		—		21	0
Reading	Total		280	2	16	0	15	2	—		3	0	314	4
Charlton Athletic	2020–21	League One	36	1	0	0	0	0	—		0	0	36	1
Charlton Athletic	2021–22	League One	18	0	1	0	1	0	—		2 (Note: Two appearances in the EFL Trophy)	0	22	0
Charlton Athletic	Total		54	1	1	0	1	0	—		2	0	58	1
AFC Wimbledon	2022–23	League Two	31	0	1	0	1	0	—		2	0	35	0
Career total			539	5	27	0	27	2	7	0	11	0	611	7

=== International ===
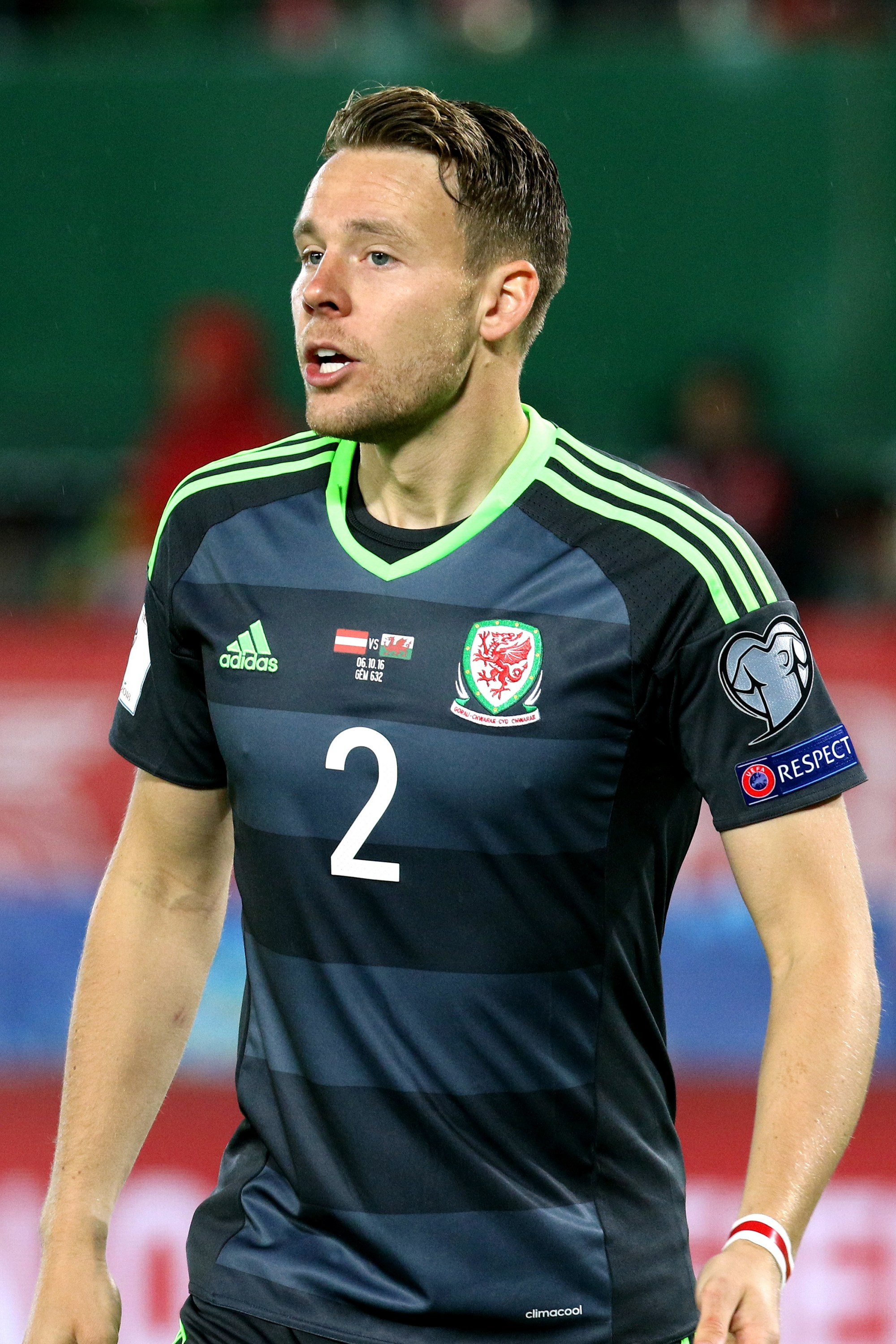
Gunter playing for Wales in 2016

Appearances and goals by national team and year
National team	Year	Apps	Goals
Wales	2007	3	0
Wales	2008	8	0
Wales	2009	9	0
Wales	2010	5	0
Wales	2011	10	0
Wales	2012	7	0
Wales	2013	9	0
Wales	2014	6	0
Wales	2015	7	0
Wales	2016	13	0
Wales	2017	8	0
Wales	2018	8	0
Wales	2019	3	0
Wales	2020	3	0
Wales	2021	7	0
Wales	2022	3	0
Total		109	0

== Honours ==
Tottenham Hotspur

- Football League Cup runner-up: 2008–09

Individual

- PFA Team of the Year: 2009–10 Championship
- Welsh Footballer of the Year: 2017

== See also ==
- List of men's footballers with 100 or more international caps
