= Welsh Footballer of the Year =

Annual top Welsh footballer award

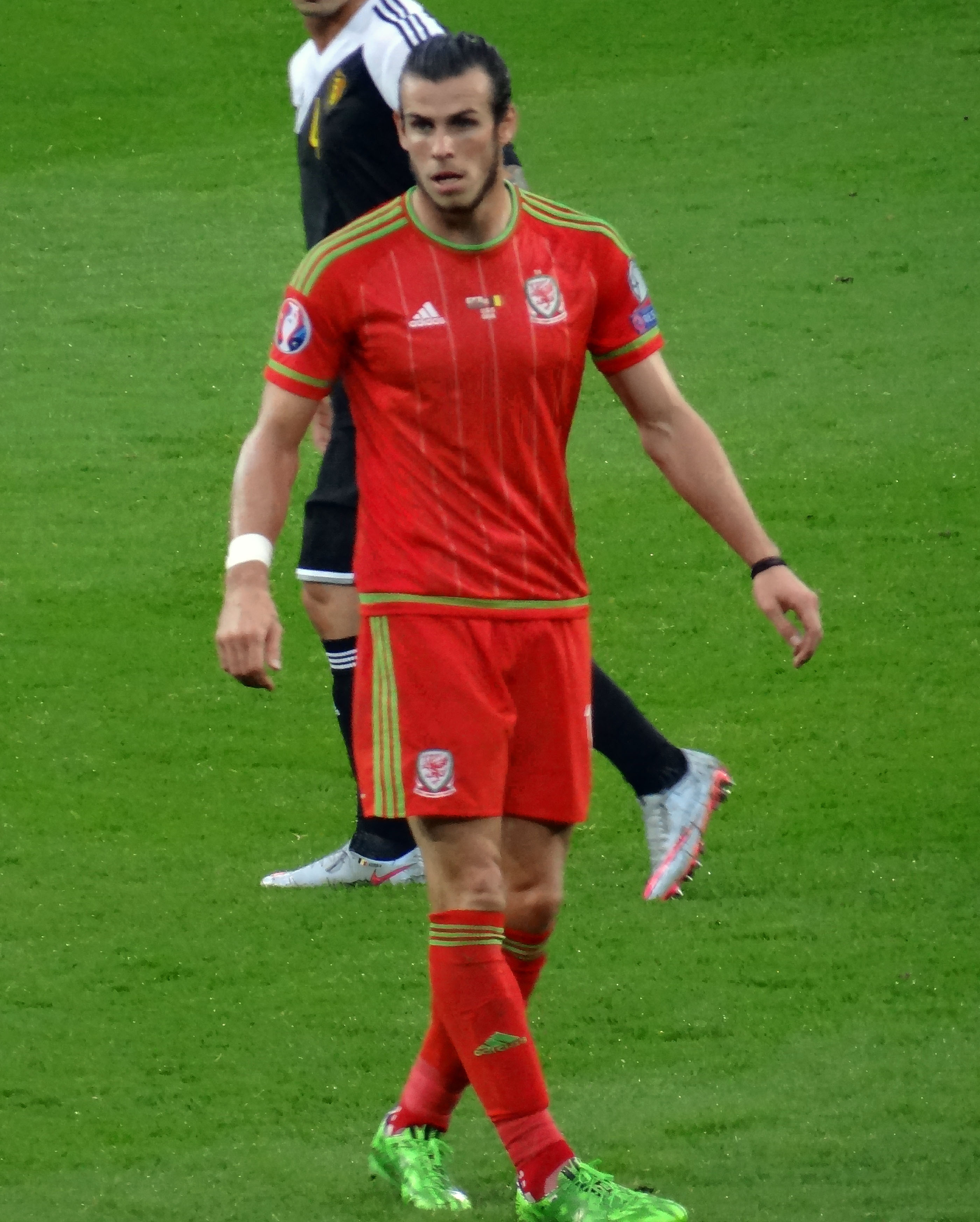
Gareth Bale, pictured here in 2015, is a six-time winner of the men's award.

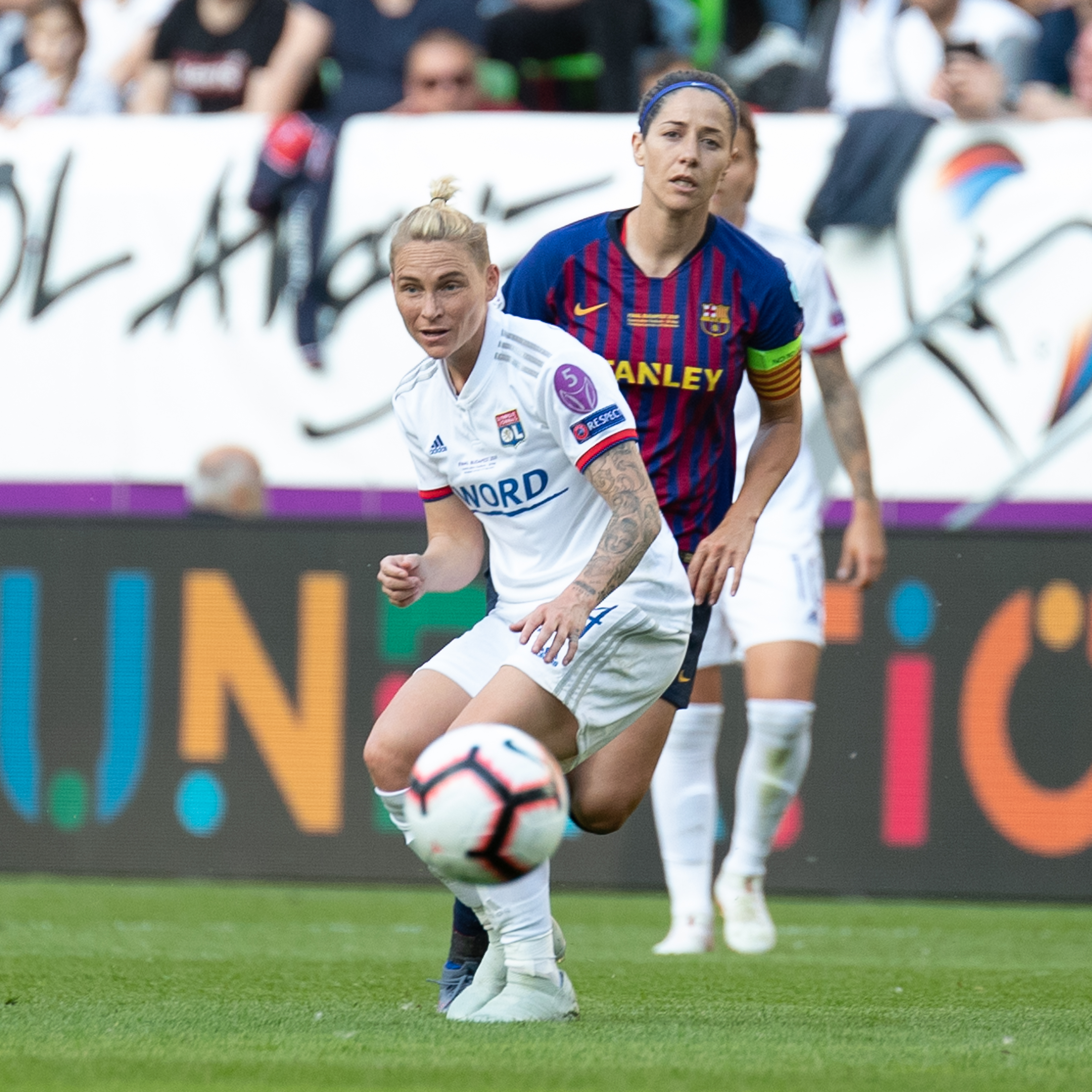
Jess Fishlock, pictured here at 2018–19 UEFA Women's Champions League, has won the women's award five times.

The Welsh Footballer of the Year is an annual award chosen by the FAW, to determine the best player in Wales.

== Winners ==
=== Men ===
| Year | Player | Club(s) | Reference |
|---|---|---|---|
| 1993 | Mark Hughes | (England) Manchester United | |
| 1994 | Mark Hughes | (England) Manchester United | |
| 1996 | Ryan Giggs | (England) Manchester United | |
| 1998 | John Hartson | (England) West Ham United | |
| 1999 | Paul Jones | (England) Southampton | |
| 2000 | John Robinson | (England) Charlton Athletic | |
| 2001 | John Hartson | (England) Wimbledon (England) Coventry City (Scotland) Celtic | |
| 2002 | Simon Davies | (England) Tottenham Hotspur | |
| 2003 | John Hartson | (Scotland) Celtic | |
| 2004 | Robert Earnshaw | (Wales) Cardiff City (England) West Bromwich Albion | |
| 2005 | Danny Gabbidon | (Wales) Cardiff City (England) West Ham United | |
| 2006 | Ryan Giggs | (England) Manchester United | |
| 2007 | Craig Bellamy | (England) Liverpool (England) West Ham United | |
| 2008 | Simon Davies | (England) Fulham | |
| 2009 | Ashley Williams | (Wales) Swansea City | |
| 2010 | Gareth Bale | (England) Tottenham Hotspur | |
| 2011 | Gareth Bale | (England) Tottenham Hotspur | |
| 2012 | Joe Allen | (Wales) Swansea City (England) Liverpool | |
| 2013 | Gareth Bale | (England) Tottenham Hotspur (Spain) Real Madrid | |
| 2014 | Gareth Bale | (Spain) Real Madrid | |
| 2015 | Gareth Bale | (Spain) Real Madrid | |
| 2016 | Gareth Bale | (Spain) Real Madrid | |
| 2017 | Chris Gunter | (England) Reading | |
| 2018 | David Brooks | (England) Sheffield United (England) Bournemouth | |

=== Women ===
| Year | Player | Club | Reference |
|---|---|---|---|
| 2011 | Jess Fishlock | (England) Bristol Academy | |
| 2012 | Jess Fishlock | (England) Bristol Academy | |
| 2013 | Jess Fishlock | (United States) Seattle Reign | |
| 2014 | Jess Fishlock | (United States) Seattle Reign | |
| 2015 | Kylie Davies | (England) Reading Women | |
| 2016 | Natasha Harding | (England) Liverpool Ladies | |
| 2017 | Laura O'Sullivan | (England) Yeovil Town | |
| 2018 | Jess Fishlock | (United States) Seattle Reign | |

== See also ==
- List of sports awards honoring women
