= Laura O'Sullivan =

Welsh footballer (born 1991)

Laura O'Sullivan-Jones
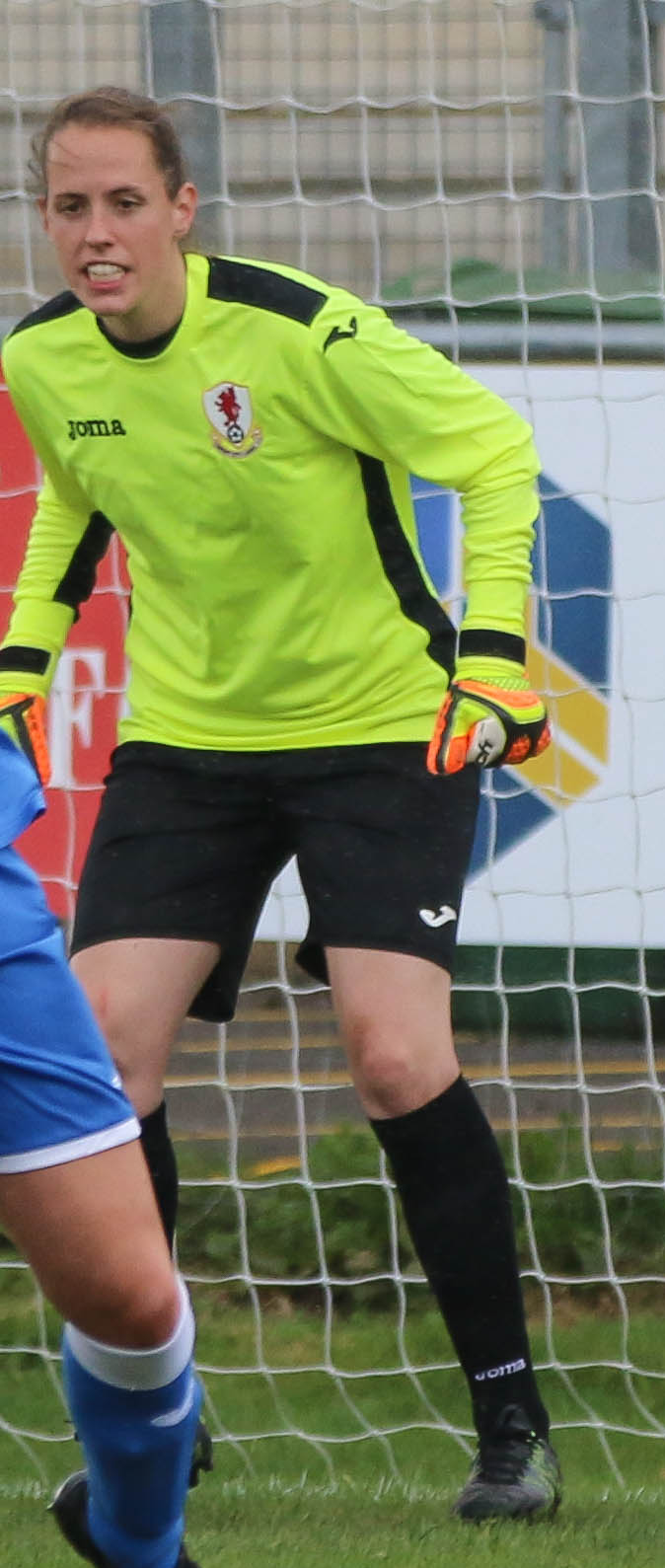
- O'Sullivan-Jones in goal for Cardiff City against Lewes in 2016

Personal information
- Date of birth: 23 August 1991 (age 35)
- Place of birth: Wales
- Position: Goalkeeper

Team information
- Current team: Gwalia United F.C.
- Number: 1

Senior career*
Years	Team	Apps	(Gls)
2011–2017	Cardiff City		
2017	Yeovil Town	0	(0)
2017–2018	Cyncoed Ladies		
2018–	Cardiff City	30	(0)

International career^{‡}
2016–	Wales	59	(0)
- * Club domestic league appearances and goals as of 5 May 2020 (UTC) ‡ National team caps and goals as of 24 June 2024

Laura O'Sullivan-Jones (born 23 August 1991) is a Welsh footballer who plays as a goalkeeper for Gwalia United, formerly Cardiff City who officially renamed/rebranded with effect from 1 June 2024 and the Wales national team.

She began her career with Cardiff City, making her debut after converting to playing as a goalkeeper in 2015. In 2016, she made her international debut for Wales in the Cyprus Women's Cup.

== Club career ==
O'Sullivan was a latecomer to football; owing to difficulties finding transport, she rarely played as a teenager, and briefly gave up the game, a decision that she later stated she regretted. Having only taken up competitive football on a regular basis in 2011, she began her career as a defender, playing for Cardiff City, but switched to playing as a goalkeeper after covering the position on several occasions as the team struggled to find a regular keeper.

She adopted the goalkeeping position full-time in December 2014, and after impressing for Cardiff's reserve side, broke into the club's first-team squad. In her first senior year, she established herself as the club's first-choice goalkeeper and was given the Coaches' Player of the Year award at the end of the 2014–15 season.

O'Sullivan joined FA WSL 1 side Yeovil Town on 17 September 2017, alongside Welsh international teammate Hannah Miles. However, she was released by the club without playing a game in November that year, and subsequently joined Cyncoed Ladies in the Women's Welsh Premier League.

== International career ==
O'Sullivan was called up to squad training camps on two occasions before being handed her debut for the Wales senior side by manager Jayne Ludlow on 2 March 2016, during a 2–2 draw with Finland in their opening group match of the 2016 Cyprus Women's Cup, less than 18 months after converting to playing as a goalkeeper. She played in Wales' two other group matches against Czech Republic and Poland as they were eliminated in the group stage. In October 2017, she was named 2017 Welsh Footballer of the Year. She kept five successive clean sheets during Wales's qualification campaign for the 2019 FIFA Women's World Cup, including a Player of the Match award against England on 6 April 2018.

On 17 April 2025, it was announced that O’Sullivan had suffered an ACL injury and would miss the upcoming Euros.

She has earnt 59 caps for Cymru

== Personal life ==
Laura’s hobbies outside of football include walking and playing Welsh baseball.

== Career statistics ==
Some entries may be missing or incomplete due to lack of historical statistics.

Appearances and goals by club, season and competition
Club	Season	League			FA Cup		League Cup		Total	
Club	Season	Division	Apps	Goals	Apps	Goals	Apps	Goals	Apps	Goals
Cardiff City	2011–12	FA Women's Premier League								
Cardiff City	2012–13									
Cardiff City	2013–14									
Cardiff City	2014–15									
Cardiff City	2015–16	Premier League South								
Cardiff City	2016–17	Premier League South								
Cardiff City	Total									
Yeovil Town	2017	FA WSL 1	0	0	0	0	0	0	0	0
Cyncoed Ladies	2017-18	Women's Welsh Premier League								
Cardiff City	2018–19	National League South								
Cardiff City	2019–20	National League South								
Cardiff City	2020–21	National League South								
Cardiff City	2021–22	National League South								
Cardiff City	2022–23	National League South West								
Cardiff City	2023–24	National League South								
Cardiff City	Total									
Gwalia United	2024–25	National League South	20	0	3	0	1	0	24	0
Career total

== Honours ==
- Cardiff City Coaches Player of the Year: 2014–15
- Welsh Footballer of the Year: 2017
