= Hannah Miles =

Welsh footballer

Personal information
- Date of birth: 13 April 1998 (age 28)
- Place of birth: Wales
- Position: Midfielder

Team information
- Current team: Cardiff City

Senior career*
Years	Team	Apps	(Gls)
2016–2017	Cardiff City	11	(0)
2017–2018	Yeovil Town	12	(1)
2018–	Cardiff City	9	(2)

International career
2016–2017	Wales U-19	5	(0)
2017–	Wales	2	(0)
- * Club domestic league appearances and goals as of 06:43, 22 May 2018 (UTC)

Hannah Miles (born 13 April 1998) is a Welsh footballer who plays as a midfielder for Cardiff City and the Wales national team.

== Playing career ==
=== Club ===
Miles joined FA WSL 1 side Yeovil Town on 17 September 2017, alongside Welsh international teammate Laura O'Sullivan.

=== International ===
As of September 2017, Miles has earned eight caps with the Wales national team. In 2017, she made an appearance during the qualifying phase of the UEFA Women's Euro 2017.
