= Gareth Bale =

Welsh footballer (born 1989)

Gareth Bale MBE
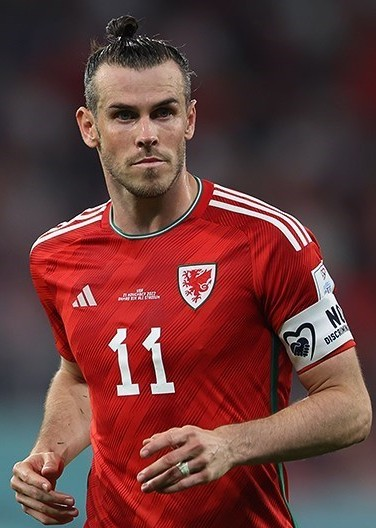
- Bale in 2022

Personal information
- Full name: Gareth Frank Bale
- Date of birth: 16 July 1989 (age 37)
- Place of birth: Cardiff, Wales
- Height: 6 ft 1 in (1.86 m)
- Positions: Right winger; forward

Youth career
- Cardiff Civil Service
- 1999–2006: Southampton

Senior career*
Years	Team	Apps	(Gls)
2006–2007	Southampton	40	(5)
2007–2013	Tottenham Hotspur	146	(42)
2013–2022	Real Madrid	176	(81)
2020–2021	→ Tottenham Hotspur (loan)	20	(11)
2022–2023	Los Angeles FC	12	(2)
Total		394	(141)

International career
2005–2006	Wales U17	7	(1)
2006	Wales U19	1	(1)
2006–2008	Wales U21	4	(2)
2006–2022	Wales	111	(41)
- * Club domestic league appearances and goals

Gareth Frank Bale (born 16 July 1989) is a Welsh former professional footballer who played as a right winger, most notably for Tottenham Hotspur, Real Madrid, and the Wales national team. A five-time UEFA Champions League winner, he is widely regarded as one of the best players of his generation and the greatest Welsh player of all time. Bale was appointed Member of the Order of the British Empire (MBE) in the 2022 Birthday Honours for his contributions to association football and various charities.

Bale began his professional career at Southampton, playing as a left-back before moving to Tottenham in 2007. From the 2009–10 season, under coach Harry Redknapp, Bale transformed into a winger. With Tottenham, he rose to international prominence during the club's 2010–11 Champions League campaign. At the end of the season, he was named the PFA Players' Player of the Year, before earning the award again following his 2012–13 campaign that led Real Madrid to sign him in September 2013 for a then world-record transfer fee of £85.1 million (€100.8 million). During his time at Tottenham, he was included in the UEFA Team of the Year twice.

Bale went on to be an integral player for Madrid, scoring over 100 goals for them. In his debut season, he scored the winning goal in the 2014 Copa del Rey final against rivals Barcelona and the go-ahead goal in extra time of the 2014 Champions League final, helping Madrid win the long-awaited La Décima. In 2015–16, he scored 19 goals in 23 matches in La Liga and assisted the opening goal in the 2016 Champions League final, later making the three-man shortlist for the UEFA Men's Player of the Year Award. He earned Man of the Match after scoring twice, including an overhead kick, in the 2018 Champions League final, and helped Madrid win the 2018 FIFA Club World Cup, where he received the Golden Ball as the tournament's best player. Bale returned to Tottenham on loan before playing his final season in Madrid. He joined MLS club Los Angeles FC in July 2022, winning an MLS Cup.

Bale made his international debut for Wales in May 2006. He had 111 caps for the nation and scored 41 goals, making him Wales' most capped player and top goalscorer of all time. He was the top goalscorer for Wales in the qualifying rounds for UEFA Euro 2016, scoring seven times; he played every match for Wales in the actual tournament and led Wales to the semi-finals, scoring three goals. He also played in Euro 2020 and helped Wales qualify for the 2022 FIFA World Cup, ending a 64-year appearance drought at the World Cup for Wales. He was named Welsh Footballer of the Year a record six times.

== Early life and career ==
Bale at the St David Awards, Cardiff, 2016

Gareth Frank Bale was born in Cardiff, Wales, to Frank, a school caretaker, and Debbie Bale, an operations manager. He is the nephew of former Cardiff City footballer Chris Pike. He attended Eglwys Newydd Primary School in Whitchurch from 1993 to 2000. It was while at this school that he first came to the attention of Southampton at age nine, when he was playing in a six-a-side tournament with his first club, Cardiff Civil Service. Growing up, his footballing hero was fellow Welshman and Manchester United player Ryan Giggs.

Bale attended Whitchurch High School in Cardiff. He was a keen athlete; he played football alongside future Wales rugby captain Sam Warburton, rugby, hockey and excelled at athletics. As a 14-year-old he says that he ran the 100-metre sprint in 11.4 seconds. Because of his superior footballing skill, the school's PE teacher, Gwyn Morris, had to write special rules which restricted Bale to playing one-touch football and not using his left foot.

Despite being only 16 at the time, Bale helped the school's under-18 team win the Cardiff & Vale Senior Cup. He left school in the summer of 2005 with a Grade A in PE amongst his other GCSE results. In his final year at school, he was awarded the PE department's prize for services to sport. In the presentation, Morris commented:

"Gareth has a fierce determination to succeed and has the character and qualities to achieve his personal goals. He is one of the most unselfish individuals that I have had the pleasure to help educate."

== Club career ==
=== Southampton ===
On 17 April 2006, at the age of 16 years and 275 days, Bale became the second youngest player ever to play for Southampton (after Theo Walcott, who was 132 days younger) when he made his debut in the Saints' 2–0 victory against Millwall. On 6 August, Bale scored his first league goal, a free kick, to level the score at 1–1 against Derby County. The final score at Pride Park was 2–2.

He scored again, at St Mary's, against Coventry City in the team's second game of the 2006–07 season with another free kick. Bale further developed his reputation as a threat on free kicks when he struck the post from one against West Bromwich Albion. By 16 December 2006, Bale's goal count had risen to five, thanks to a late equaliser against Sunderland and free kicks away to Hull City and at home to Norwich City.

In December 2006, he won the Carwyn James Award for the BBC Wales Young Sports Personality of the Year, and was named the Football League Young Player of the Year on 4 March 2007. This capped what was described in the local press as an "incredible" first full season as a professional footballer in which he was one of the Saints' "most creative players even (though operating) from the left-back position whilst his defending improved immeasurably as the season progressed."

His final game for Southampton was in the first leg of the Championship play-off semi-final against Derby County on 12 May 2007. Bale suffered an injury during the second half, preventing him from appearing in the second leg. In total, he made 45 appearances for Southampton, scoring five goals.

=== Tottenham Hotspur ===
On 25 May 2007, Bale signed a four-year deal with Tottenham Hotspur with the club paying an initial £5 million for the player, potentially rising to £10 million based on appearances and success.

==== 2007 to 2009 ====
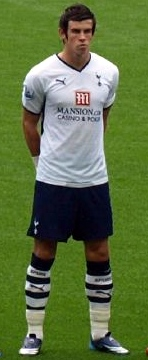
Bale before a Premier League match against Chelsea in August 2008

Bale played his first game for Spurs in a friendly against St. Patrick's Athletic on 12 July 2007, but was substituted on the 80th minute with a minor dead leg. He made his competitive debut for Tottenham Hotspur on 26 August away against Manchester United. On 1 September 2007, in his second Spurs appearance, he scored his first goal for the club in a 3–3 draw with Fulham. Bale went on to score against Arsenal in the North London derby from a free kick. He then scored in the League Cup home tie against Middlesbrough.

On 2 December 2007, Bale was substituted after sustaining an injury resulting from a tackle from Fabrice Muamba in the league fixture against Birmingham City. A scan revealed that Bale had suffered ligament damage to his right ankle, consigning him to an extended period on the sidelines. Bale had exploratory surgery on 11 December. By February 2008, it became clear that Bale was to miss the rest of the season through injury. Sporting Director of Tottenham, Damien Comolli said, "Even if the examination reveals that Gareth's foot is stable, the decision has been taken to bring him back slowly to ensure he does not get a repeat of the injury or suffer any further damage. Gareth is obviously disappointed to be sidelined for this length of time but he is still young and we have to do what is best for him in the long run."

Bale returned to fitness in August 2008, the same month he signed a new four-year deal with the club, and went on to make 30 appearances for Tottenham in all competitions that season. He picked up his first career red card in a 2–1 defeat at Stoke City in October 2008. That season he took part in the League Cup final against Manchester United. Bale came off the bench in the 98th minute in extra time with the final result deadlocked at 0–0 resulting in a penalty shoot-out that ended 4–1 to Manchester United.

==== 2009 to 2011 ====
In June 2009, Bale underwent surgery for a knee injury, ruling him out for over two months. He missed pre-season matches and it was projected that he would miss the first few weeks of the 2009–10 season. On 26 September, he made his comeback as an 85th-minute substitute in Tottenham's 5–0 win over Burnley. This was Bale's first ever involvement in a Premier League win, after not being on the winning side since the Southampton move; however, he struggled to break into the first team, in part due to Benoit Assou-Ekotto's form. When Assou-Ekotto was sidelined with an injury, manager Harry Redknapp decided to give Bale a chance and he impressed in Spurs' FA Cup third-round 4–0 win over Peterborough United. His first victory as a starter in a league game came in the 2–0 win over London rivals Fulham on 26 January 2010.

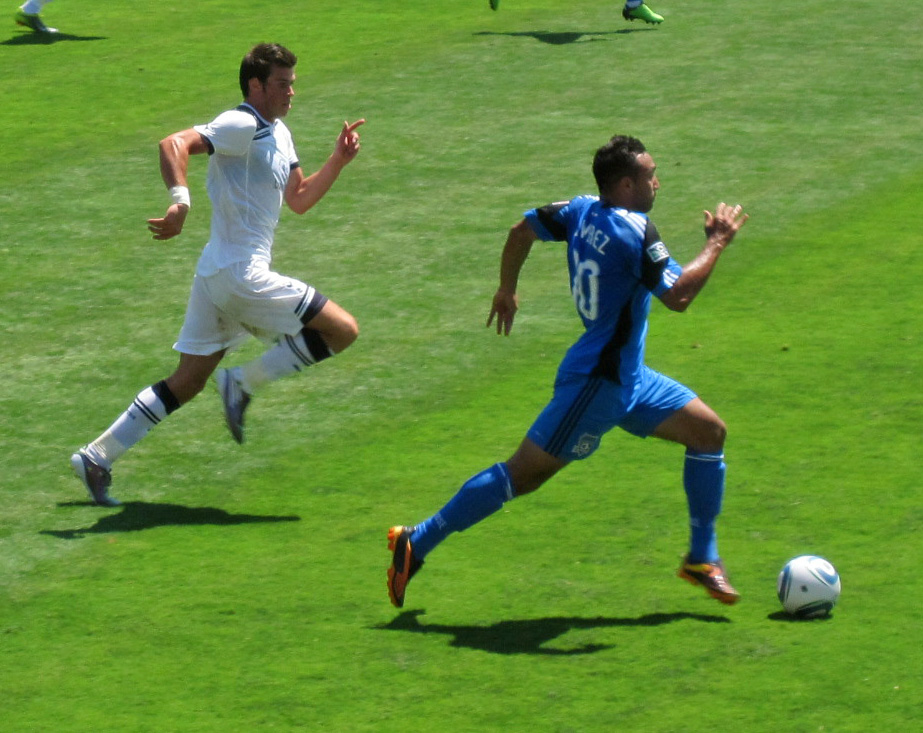
Bale (left) chasing San Jose Earthquakes player Arturo Alvarez in a pre-season friendly in July 2010

Bale's good form continued and he was named Player of the Round after helping Spurs to a 3–1 win in the sixth round replay of the FA Cup against Fulham. In April 2010, Bale scored the winning goal in a 2–1 North London derby win against Arsenal, tapping past Manuel Almunia, after a pass from Jermain Defoe. Three days later, Bale scored Tottenham's winning goal with his weaker right foot in a 2–1 victory over league leaders and eventual champions Chelsea and was named man of the match. He was named Premier League Player of the Month for April 2010. He signed a new four-year contract at White Hart Lane on 7 May 2010, as a reward for helping the club reaching a 2010–11 UEFA Champions League qualification place.

On 21 August 2010, Bale scored twice in a 2–1 win at Stoke City, the second of which was a head-high volley into the top right hand corner of the goal. This was later awarded the BBC Goal of the Month for August 2010. On 25 August, Bale set up all four goals to help Spurs overcome Young Boys 4–0 (6–3 agg.) in a Champions League play-off at White Hart Lane. Although Assou-Ekotto had already returned from injury, Bale continued his good form and cemented his place in the starting eleven, with his manager opting him to move to left wing to accommodate Assou-Ekotto at left-back. On 29 September, Bale scored his first Champions League goal for Tottenham in a 4–1 home win against Dutch champions Twente in their second game of the group stages. For his performances, he was named Welsh Player of the Year by the Football Association of Wales (FAW).

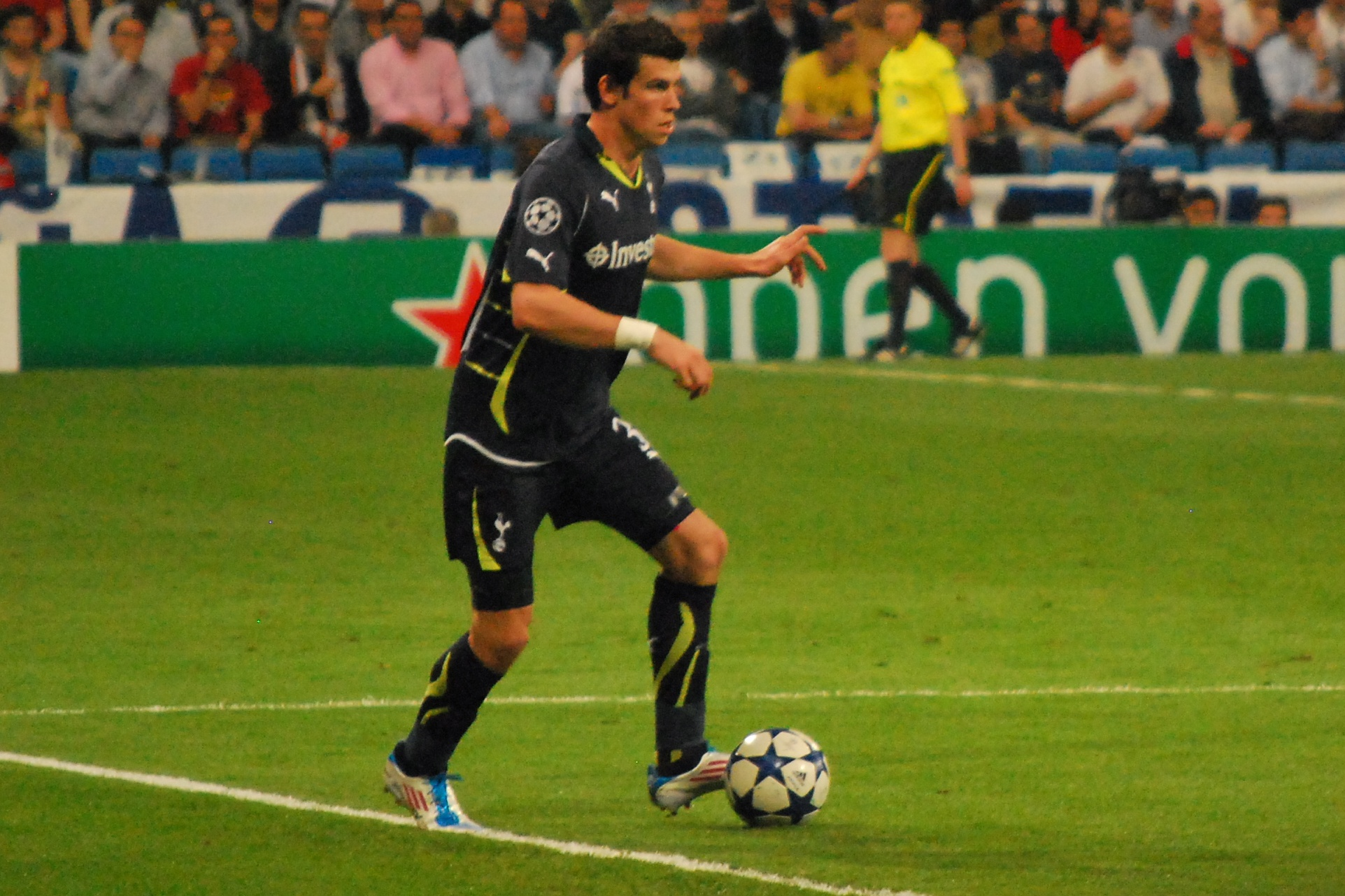
Bale on the ball during the 2010–11 UEFA Champions League

Bale rose to international attention during the 2010–11 Champions League. On 20 October, he scored his first senior hat-trick against European champions Inter Milan at the San Siro in the Champions League. Tottenham lost the match 4–3, having been 4–0 down inside the first 35 minutes and playing with ten men for over 80 minutes of the match after goalkeeper Heurelho Gomes had been sent off in the eighth minute for a professional foul on Inter's Jonathan Biabiany. In the return match at White Hart Lane on 2 November, Bale provided a man-of-the-match performance, setting up goals for Peter Crouch and Roman Pavlyuchenko to earn Spurs a memorable 3–1 win.

On 4 November, Bale stated that he intended to remain at Tottenham for the remainder of his recently signed four-year contract, despite reported interest from other clubs, then, in December, he was awarded the BBC Wales Sports Personality of the Year trophy. On 19 March 2011, it was announced he would then extended his stay at the club until 2015. On 17 April, Bale was honoured with the PFA Players' Player of the Year award, as voted for by his peers.

==== 2011 to 2013 ====
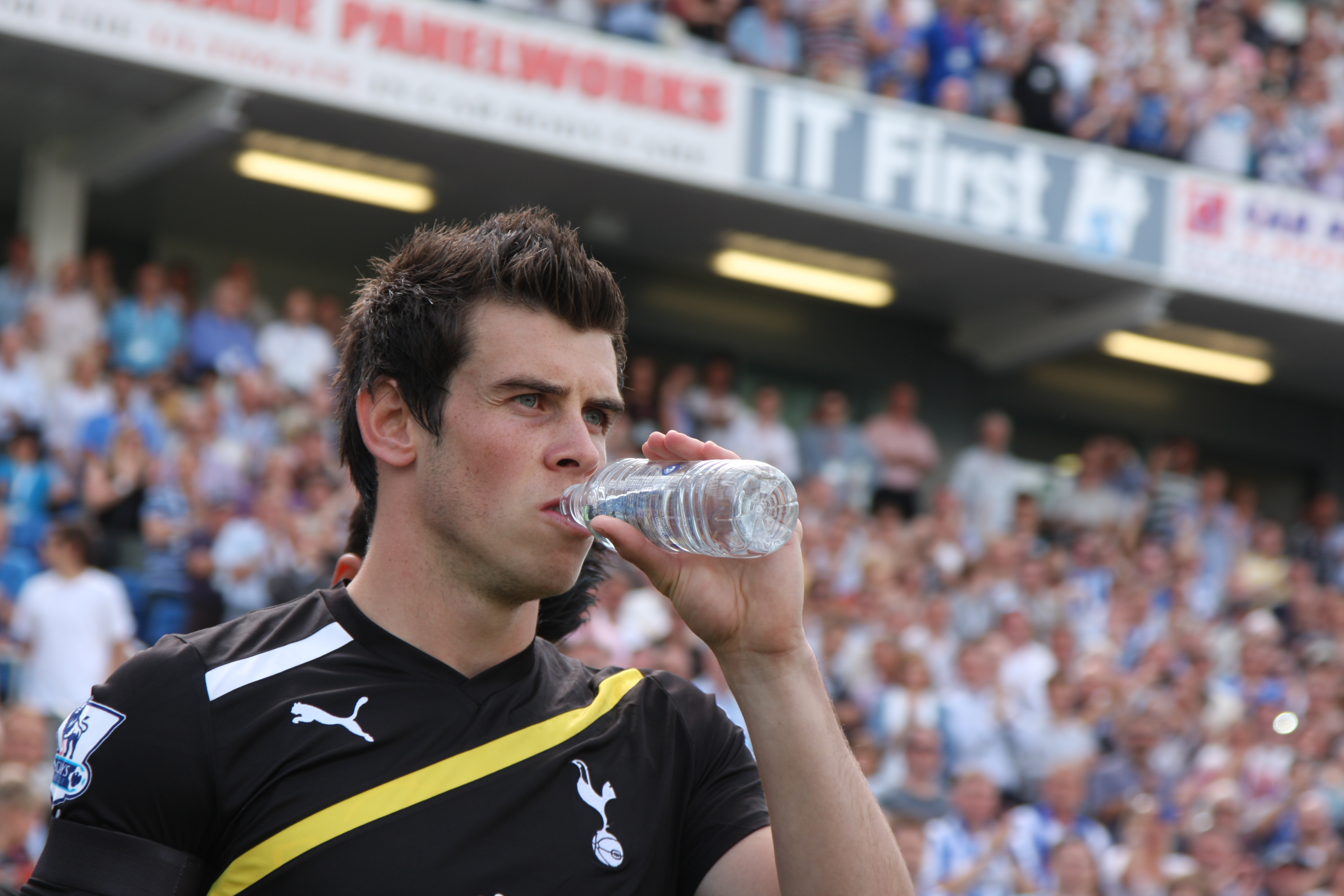
Bale during a friendly match against Brighton in July 2011

Bale scored his first goal of the 2011–12 season on 24 September 2011, in an away game against Wigan Athletic. The game ended in a 2–1 victory for Tottenham. He added his second and third goals of the season on 30 October with two goals against Queens Park Rangers in a 3–1 home win. He continued his good form with the first goal in a 3–1 victory over Fulham the following week, whilst also setting up Aaron Lennon who made it 2–0 on the stroke of half time. The first goal against Fulham was later ruled by the "dubious goals committee" to be an own goal by Chris Baird.

On 3 December, Bale scored the first goal in Tottenham's 3–0 victory over Bolton Wanderers. He marked the goal with a tribute to Gary Speed by holding up his left boot, with "R.I.P Gary Speed" stitched on it, in front of the Bolton fans. On 27 December, Bale scored twice to give Tottenham a 2–0 win against Norwich City. On 5 January 2012, Bale was one of the players voted into the 2011 UEFA Team of the Year. He scored his third brace of the season as he scored twice against Wigan, on 31 January to take his tally to ten goals for the season. In January 2012, he was named Premier League Player of the Month for the second time in his career, after three goals and two assists in the Premier League for the month. On 27 June, Bale signed a new four-year contract, committing his future to the club until 2016.

For the 2012–13 season, Bale changed his squad number from 3 to 11 as he was "not a left-back anymore" and had asked the club for a "higher number". On 16 September 2012, Bale scored his first goal of the 2012–13 season against Reading in a 3–1 away victory. On 29 September, Bale scored the second goal in Tottenham's 3–2 away victory over Manchester United, their first win at Old Trafford since 1989.

He scored his first Premier League hat-trick in a 4–0 away win on Boxing Day against Aston Villa. On 5 January 2013, Bale scored in the FA Cup third round fixture against Coventry City as well as assisting Clint Dempsey on both of his goals in a 3–0 win. On 30 January, Bale scored a magnificent solo effort in the 1–1 draw with Norwich City. Bale then scored against West Bromwich Albion in a 1–0 away win on 3 February. Bale then took his goal tally of the season to 15 goals with a brace against Newcastle United in a match which Spurs won 2–1. This took Spurs into third place and strengthened their Champions League ambitions.

In Bale's next game, he scored directly from two free kicks, one from 35 yards out just before half time and another from 25 yards out in the dying seconds of injury time, to give Tottenham a 2–1 victory over Lyon in the first leg of their Europa League round of 32 tie on 14 February. This took Bale to a tally of ten goals in his previous ten appearances. In Tottenham's Premier League match against West Ham on 25 February, Bale scored the first and third in a 3–2 win for Tottenham. His second, a long range dipping strike from over 30 yards, in the dying stages of the game, capped a world class performance. This was his eighth goal in six games.

On 3 March, Bale scored against Arsenal in a North London derby that Tottenham won 2–1. On 7 March, Tottenham faced Inter Milan in the Europa League, with Bale scoring the opening goal and Tottenham winning 3–0. Bale's run of good form in the early months of 2013 saw him win Premier League Player of the Month for February as well as the BBC Goal of the Month in both January and February for his strikes against Norwich City and West Ham United respectively. On 4 April, Bale injured his right ankle in the first leg of the Europa League quarter-final against Basel. On his return from injury, Bale scored a goal and assisted Clint Dempsey as Tottenham beat Manchester City at White Hart Lane.

On 28 April, Bale won both the PFA Players' Player of the Year and Young Player of the Year after his excellent showing in the 2012–13 season. A week later, on 2 May 2013, he added the FWA Footballer of the Year Award from the Football Writers' Association, making Bale one of only two players who have won all three in the same season – the other being Cristiano Ronaldo, who won them in 2007. Bale scored the winning goal against his former club Southampton on 4 May. The goal gave Spurs a 1–0 win as well as being Bale's 20th in the Premier League in his 200th appearance for Spurs. On 19 May, Bale scored a 90th-minute goal from 25 yards out. This goal gave Spurs a 1–0 win over Sunderland, but was not enough to give them Champions League football for the following season.

=== Real Madrid ===
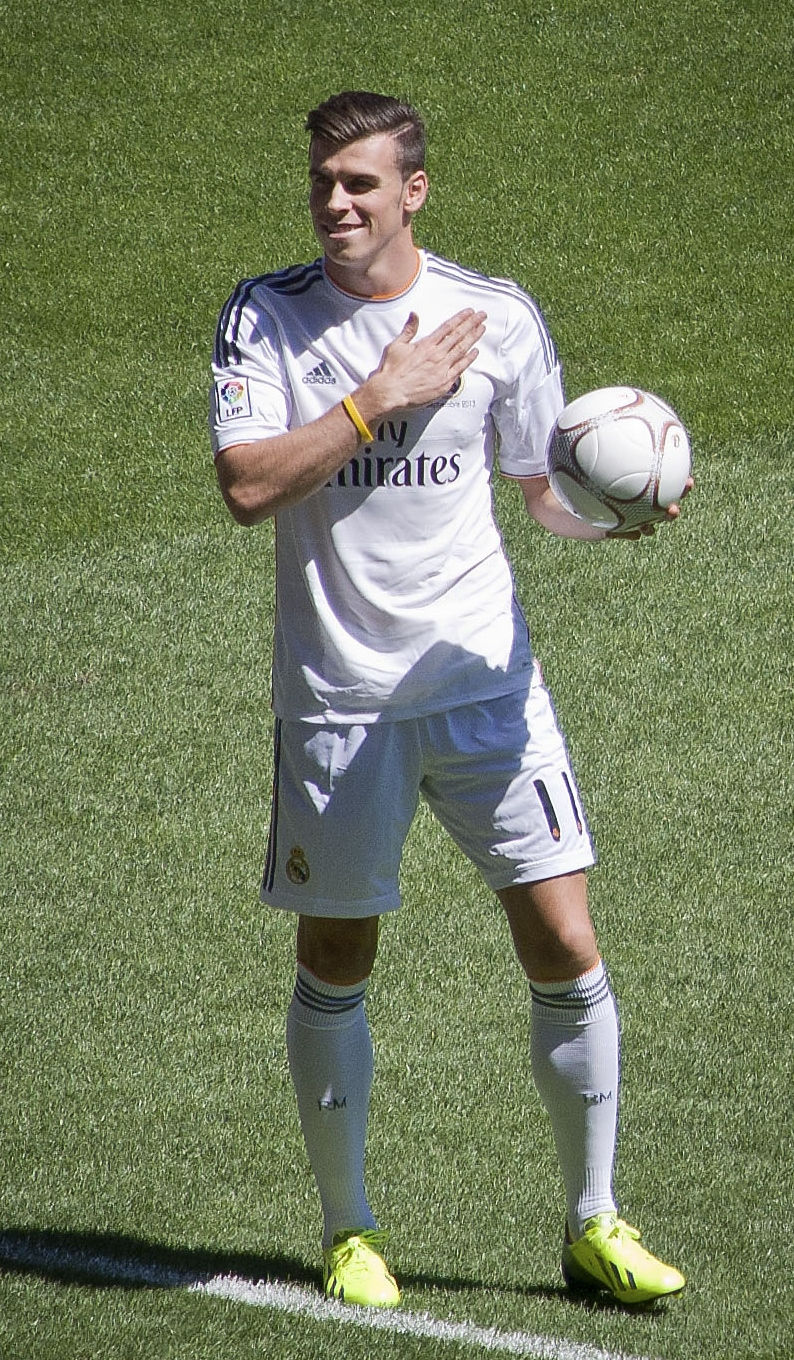
Bale at his Real Madrid unveiling in September 2013

On 1 September 2013, Spanish club Real Madrid announced that they had reached an agreement for the transfer of Bale, signing a six-year deal in a then world record deal. The Spanish press (and Real Madrid TV) reported that Bale had cost €91 million (£77 million), while the British press reported a world record transfer fee of €100 million (£85.3 million), which would be above Cristiano Ronaldo's transfer record fee of €94 million (£80 million); however, in January 2016, documents pertaining to the transfer were leaked by Football Leaks which confirmed a world record transfer fee of €100.8 million (£85.1 million). Bale's record was surpassed in August 2016 by Paul Pogba's record fee of €105 million (£89.2 million). Bale was assigned the number 11 shirt at Madrid.

==== 2013 to 2015 ====
The first half of Bale's season was plagued by injuries; of Real's first 16 games after his signing, Bale missed five and was substituted on or off in six others, playing only five full games. Bale scored on his Real Madrid debut, a goal coming in the 38th minute against Villarreal, before being substituted later in the game for Ángel Di María. Bale's second appearance for Madrid came in a 6–1 victory over Galatasaray in the Champions League. Although Bale only played the final 26 minutes, his free kick led to Cristiano Ronaldo's second goal of the game. On 28 September 2013, Bale made his home debut as a second-half substitute in a 1–0 loss to local rivals Atlético Madrid.

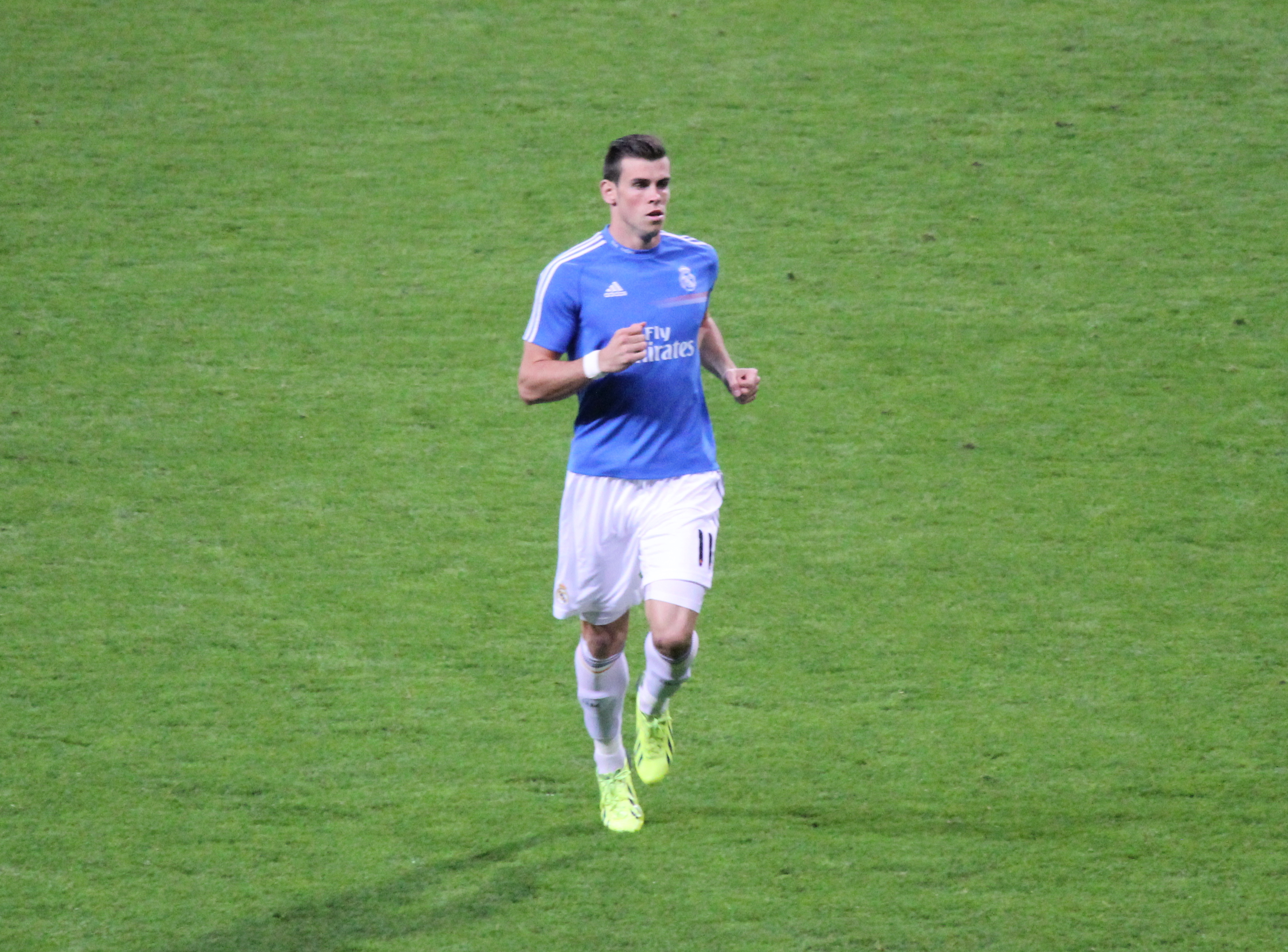
Bale training ahead of the Madrid derby against Atlético Madrid in September 2013

Following a brief appearance against Juventus in the Champions League, Bale made his El Clásico debut on 26 October, but was substituted in the 61st minute. Barcelona won the game 2–1 and Bale's performance drew some media criticism. Four days later, he scored two goals and assisted two in a 7–3 victory against Sevilla. Following his impressive performance the Spanish press nicknamed Bale "The Cannon".

In November, he assisted a further two goals in Madrid's 3–2 victory over Rayo Vallecano, before scoring in a 2–2 draw with Juventus in the Champions League. He then scored a 25-yard free kick against Galatasaray in the Champions League, a match which Madrid won 4–1 despite being a man down. On 30 November, Bale rounded off the month with his first hat-trick for Real Madrid, as well as assisting Karim Benzema, in a 4–0 victory over Real Valladolid. It was a "perfect hat-trick": one goal with a header and one with each foot.

On 26 February 2014, he scored twice in Real Madrid's 6–1 win against Schalke 04 in the Champions League round of 16 first leg. He then scored one of the team's three goals in a 3–0 quarter-final win over Borussia Dortmund on 2 April, taking him to five Champions League goals for the season. In La Liga, he scored four goals in three matches between gameweeks 31 and 33, as Real Madrid defeated Rayo Vallecano (5–0), Real Sociedad (4–0) and Almería (4–0).

"It is difficult to see a player sprint like that at that stage of the game."

— Barcelona coach Gerardo Martino on Bale's 85th minute winner for Madrid in the Copa del Rey final.

On 16 April, Bale scored the winning goal for Real Madrid with five minutes remaining in the 2014 Copa del Rey Final against rivals Barcelona. Considered one of the best goals of his career, Bale outsprinted Barcelona defender Marc Bartra from the halfway line (with Bale running off the field at one point) before converting past goalkeeper José Manuel Pinto. In the post match interview Bale stated, "I had to get round the player and go off the pitch to do it", while his Real Madrid teammate Xabi Alonso commented, "It was incredible, I have never seen anything like it". The goal was Bale's 20th of the season and his first in a Clásico fixture.

On 24 May, Bale scored in the 110th minute of the extra time period to put Real Madrid 2–1 up against city rivals Atlético Madrid in the 2014 Champions League Final, as Los Blancos won their tenth European Cup. The goal made Bale the first Welshman to score a goal in a European Cup/Champions League final. Bale finished his debut season with 22 goals and 16 assists in all competitions. Real Madrid's attacking trio of Bale, Benzema and Cristiano, dubbed BBC, finished the season with 97 goals.

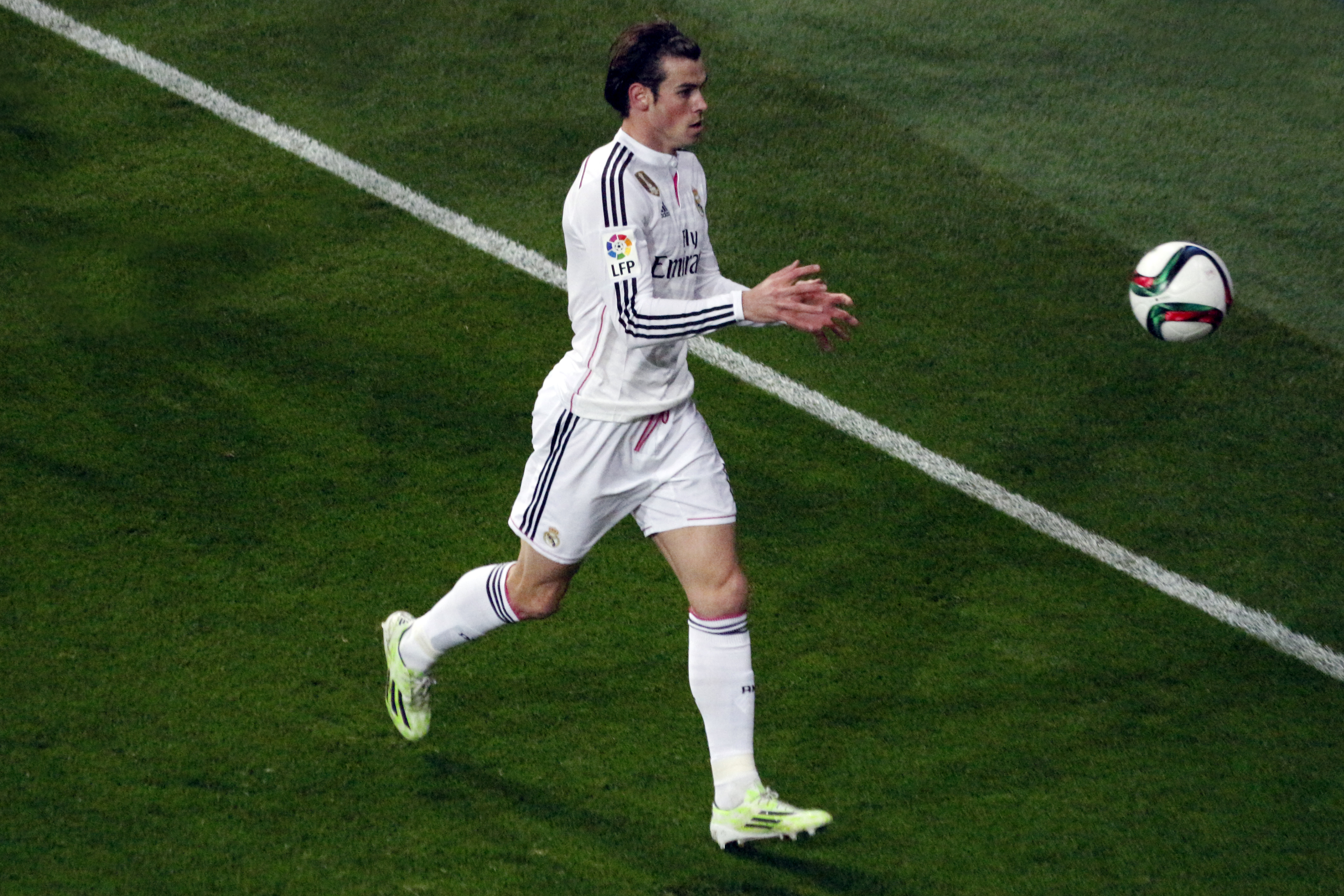
Bale during a Copa del Rey match against Atlético Madrid in January 2015

Bale started the 2014–15 season in good form, playing the full 90 minutes and assisting Cristiano Ronaldo's first goal in a 2–0 win at the Cardiff City Stadium against Sevilla to win the 2014 UEFA Super Cup. After the match, his performance was described as "amazing" by Ronaldo. Six days later, Bale scored his first goal of the season in a 4–2 away loss to Real Sociedad. Bale scored twice in Real's 8–2 win over Deportivo La Coruña on 20 September 2014.

In December 2014, Bale scored in a third major final, the second goal in a 2–0 win over San Lorenzo, to help the club win the FIFA Club World Cup. In a match against Espanyol on 10 January 2015, Bale was booed by a section of Madrid fans who adjudged him as being selfish in shooting for goal and not passing to Ronaldo. Bale was defended by Carlo Ancelotti over this plus difficulties at the end of the season. On 18 April, Bale sustained a calf injury against Málaga.

==== 2015 to 2017 ====
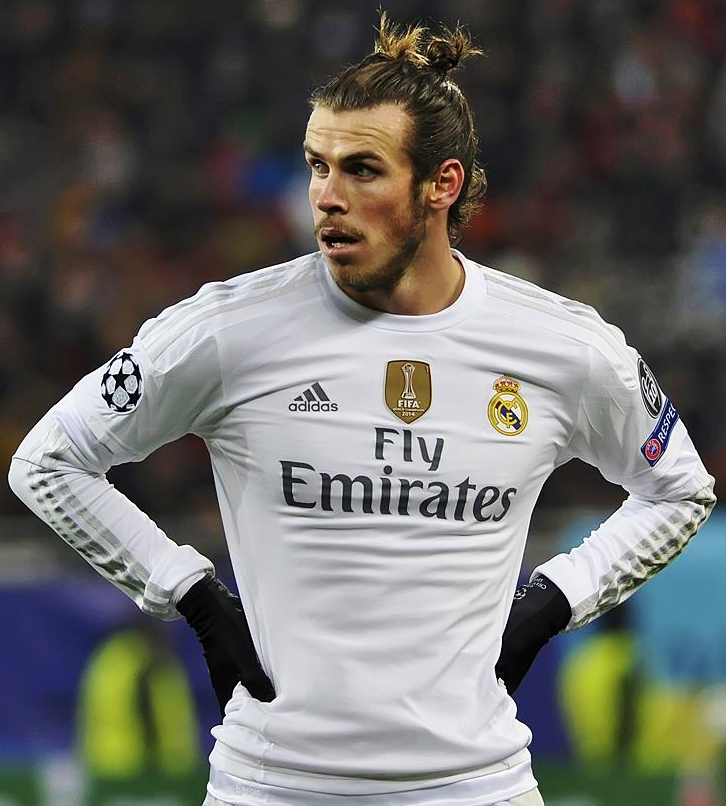
Bale during the 2015–16 Champions League campaign

Bale scored twice in Real's win over Real Betis in September 2015. His two goals took the total number of goals of Madrid's attacking trio of Bale, Benzema and Ronaldo to 200 goals since they first played together in 2013.

On 20 December 2015, he scored four goals in a 10–2 victory over Rayo Vallecano. On 9 January 2016, Bale scored his second hat-trick of the season in Madrid's 5–0 defeat of Deportivo La Coruña in Zinedine Zidane's first match as head coach of Los Blancos. After being sidelined since 19 January, due to a calf injury he sustained in a 5–1 league victory at home against Sporting Gijón, during which he had also scored the opening goal of the match, Bale returned to the pitch on 5 March; he made a substitute appearance in Real Madrid's 7–1 home win over Celta Vigo, scoring Real Madrid's final goal of the match.

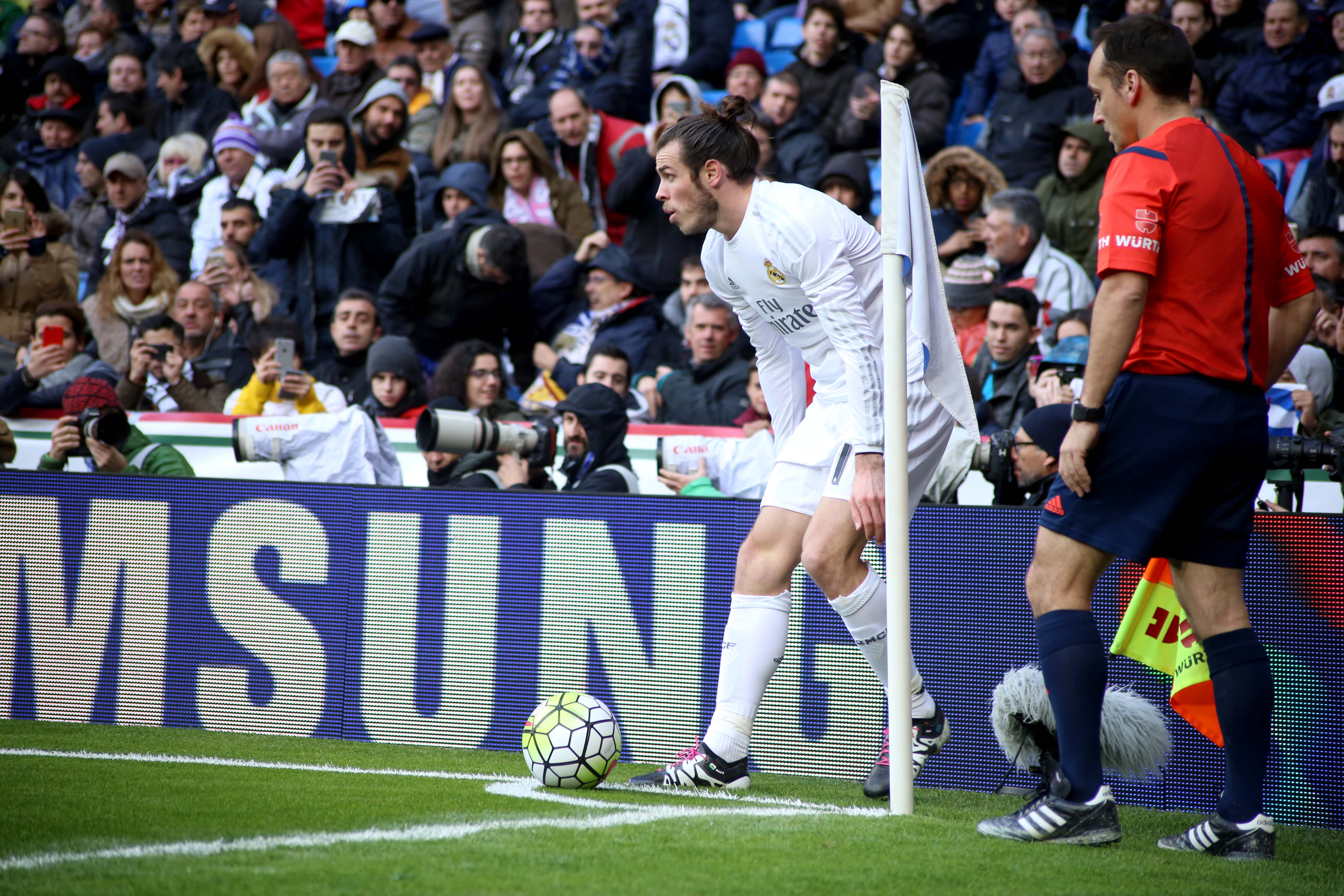
Bale preparing to take a corner kick in a La Liga match in March 2016

On 20 March 2016, Bale scored his 43rd La Liga goal in a 4–0 defeat of Sevilla to surpass Gary Lineker as the highest scoring British player in the competition's history. On 23 April, Bale scored twice as Real Madrid came from 0–2 down to win 3–2 at Rayo Vallecano. Bale was a regular starter when the team won the 2015–16 Champions League. He assisted the team's only goal and went on to score in the penalty shoot-out win over Atlético Madrid in the final.

On 30 October 2016, Bale signed a new contract with Madrid until 2022. On 22 November 2016, Bale damaged his ankle tendons during the 2–1 victory at Sporting CP that would rule him out for up to four months. On 23 April, Bale made his 100th appearance in La Liga in a 3–2 home defeat to Barcelona, but was forced off after sustaining an injury.

Despite suffering several injuries during the season, he managed to feature 19 times for Madrid as they won their 33rd La Liga title. After missing more than a month, he returned to action for the 2017 Champions League Final in his hometown, Cardiff, which Real Madrid won 4–1 over Juventus; Bale made a late second-half substitute appearance, coming on for Benzema.

==== 2017 to 2021 ====
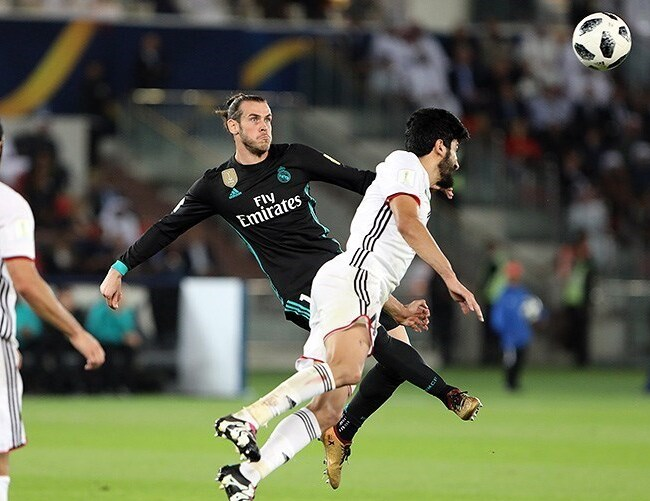
Bale attempting to shoot the ball in the air during the 2017 FIFA Club World Cup semi-final against Al Jazira

The 2017–18 season saw some improvement in Bale's goalscoring record across the league, cup competitions and in the Champions League. He featured in Real Madrid's victories in both the 2017 UEFA Super Cup and the 2017 Supercopa de España, and he also featured in the club's victorious 2017 FIFA Club World Cup campaign, winning a third trophy before 2018 had even begun. In La Liga, he made 26 appearances and scored 16 goals but Real Madrid were unable to reclaim the title, finishing in third.

The 2017–18 Champions League saw Bale scoring once prior to the final. This goal came from the match against Borussia Dortmund in the group stages, when he opened the scoring in a 3–1 victory in Germany. In the 2018 Champions League Final, Bale scored two goals, the first an overhead kick from the edge of the 18-yard box – regarded as one of the greatest goals in Champions League history – before a speculative 40-yard strike that went through the hands of goalkeeper Loris Karius, resulting in a 3–1 victory over Liverpool, to help Real Madrid win their thirteenth Champions League trophy. He became the first substitute to score twice in a Champions League final and was named man of the match.

Following the break-up of the BBC trifecta with Ronaldo's transfer to Juventus and the replacement of Zidane by new manager Julen Lopetegui, Bale was ever-present during August 2018 and was awarded Cinco Estrellas Mahou for the Real Madrid Player of the Month, scoring against Getafe and Girona along the way.

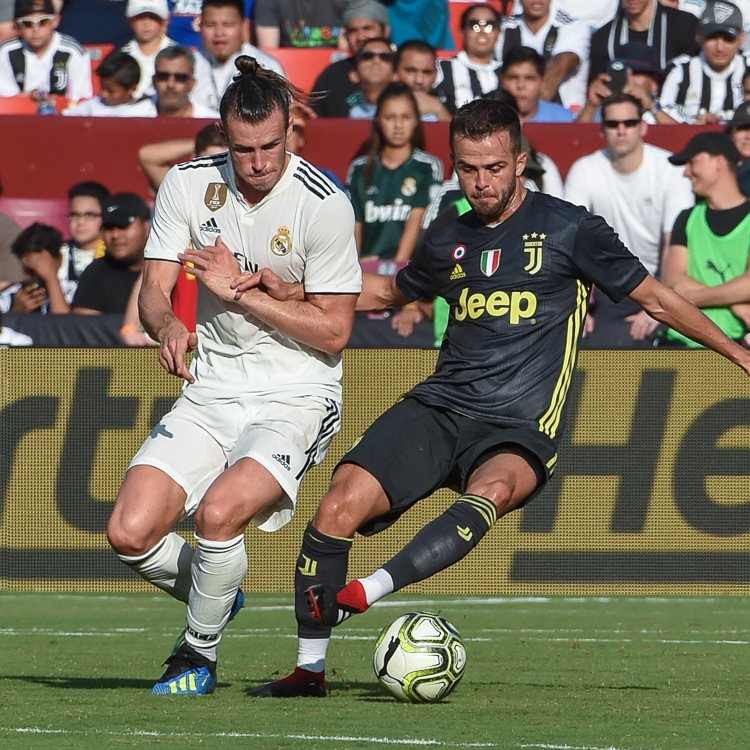
Bale (left) battling the ball with Juventus player Miralem Pjanić during a pre-season match in August 2018

On 19 December 2018, Bale scored a hat-trick in a 3–1 win over Kashima Antlers in the semi-finals of the 2018 FIFA Club World Cup. He became the third player to score a hat-trick in a FIFA Club World Cup match after Cristiano Ronaldo and Luis Suárez. He also became the third player to score in three editions of the competition after Cristiano Ronaldo and Lionel Messi. He was awarded the Golden Ball after Real Madrid won the competition by beating Al Ain 4–1 in the final.

On 9 February 2019, Bale scored his 100th goal for Real Madrid after scoring the team's third goal as a substitute in a 3–1 away win over cross-city rivals Atlético Madrid; however, he was also the source of controversy in the media following the match, due to the "provocative" goal celebration that he made towards the opposition fans.

In July 2019, he was close to leaving the club, according to manager Zinedine Zidane, but later that month a proposed transfer to Chinese club Jiangsu Suning was called off by Real Madrid. In October 2019, Bale was said to be "angry" at Real Madrid and wanted to leave, but later that month Zidane said Bale had never asked to leave. Ex-Real Madrid president Ramón Calderón also said that Bale should return to Tottenham Hotspur. He made 16 appearances during the league season, as Real Madrid won the 2019–20 La Liga.

==== 2020–2022: Loan to Tottenham Hotspur and departure ====
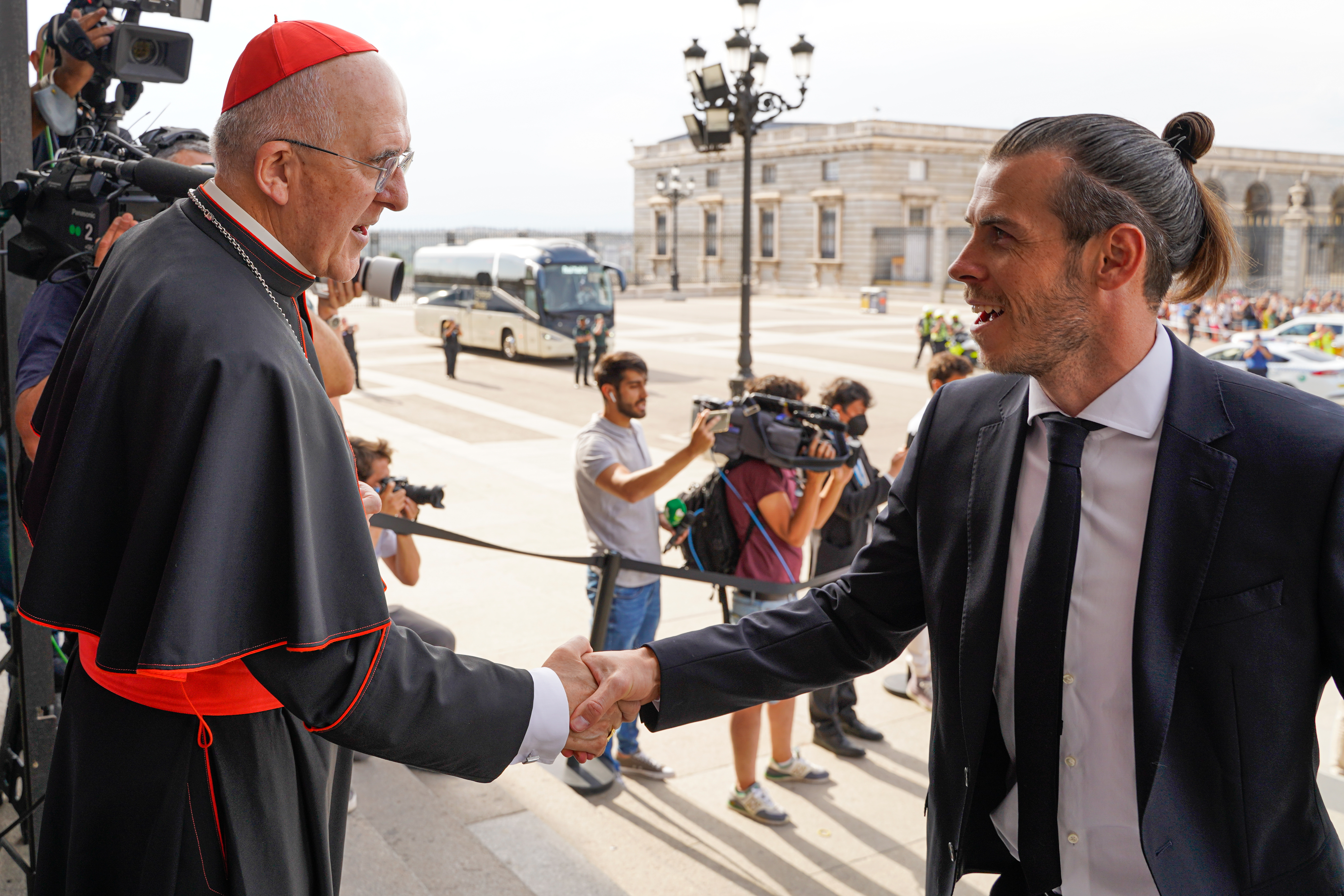
Bale being welcomed in the Almudena by Cardinal Osoro after winning the 2021–22 Champions League with Real Madrid

On 19 September 2020, Bale returned to Tottenham Hotspur on a season-long loan. He came off the bench to score the winner in Tottenham's 2–1 home win over Brighton & Hove Albion on 1 November, his first goal since returning to the club. On 3 December, Bale scored his 200th career goal in a 3–3 draw against LASK in the Europa League. He scored a brace and got an assist in a 4–0 win over Burnley on 28 February 2021. Bale once again scored twice in Tottenham's 4–1 victory against Crystal Palace on 7 March, bringing his tally to six goals in six games. On 2 May, Bale scored a hat-trick in a 4–0 win against Sheffield United. The hat-trick was only his second in the Premier League and his first since his return to Tottenham. On 23 May 2021, Bale came off the bench to score two goals against Leicester City in a 4–2 away victory which led Tottenham to a 7th-place finish, ensuring qualification to the Europa Conference League.

Bale returned to Real Madrid for the 2021–22 season. His appearances during the season were severely limited. Bale's agent, Jonathan Barnett, confirmed in May 2022 that Bale would leave Real Madrid at the end of the season. On 1 June, Bale himself published an open letter on Twitter confirming his exit.

=== Los Angeles FC and retirement ===
On 27 June 2022, Major League Soccer team Los Angeles FC announced that they had signed Bale to a 12-month contract using Targeted Allocation Money. He made his debut on 17 July as a 72nd-minute substitute in a 2–1 win at Nashville SC. In his next appearance, on 23 July, he came on as a 65th-minute substitute against Sporting Kansas City, scoring his first goal for the club in a 2–0 victory. Bale made 12 total appearances in the regular season for LAFC, starting two matches, but he remained mostly unused as the club won the Supporters' Shield. He made his only playoff appearance in the championship match as a substitute in what would be his final game of club football, where his header in the 128th minute tied the match at 3–3 and sent it to a penalty shootout, becoming the latest goal in MLS history. LAFC won the shootout and their first MLS Cup title.

On 9 January 2023, following the 2022 FIFA World Cup, Bale announced his retirement from professional football. In December 2025, Bale revealed that his father falling ill was what influenced him to retire, stating "My dad got ill and that played a massive role in my decision...People don't know what anyone's going through at home but I soon realised there's more to life than just football".

== International career ==
=== Wales ===
Bale was selected by Wales at the end of the 2005–06 season for a friendly against Trinidad and Tobago on 27 May 2006. In the match in Graz, Austria, he replaced David Vaughan after 55 minutes and assisted Robert Earnshaw's winning goal in a 2–1 victory. At 16 years and 315 days old, Bale became the youngest player to play for Wales, breaking a record held by Lewin Nyatanga who set that three months earlier; this record was itself superseded by Harry Wilson in October 2013.

Wales youth guru Brian Flynn commented that Bale was potentially a future star of the game, comparing his technical ability to that of Ryan Giggs. On 7 October 2006, Bale became the youngest ever goalscorer for the senior national team, scoring a free kick in a Euro 2008 qualification match against Slovakia. After a long injury lay-off, he returned and started in the World Cup qualifier against Finland on 10 October 2009. On 14 October, he played a part in Wales' final World Cup qualifier by setting up David Vaughan to score the opening goal against Liechtenstein and won the free kick that led to the second, Aaron Ramsey's first at senior level.

In December 2010, Bale was awarded the BBC Cymru Sports Personality of the Year trophy. On 12 October 2012, Bale scored both goals for Wales in a 2–1 victory over Scotland in a 2014 World Cup qualifier. He won his 100th Wales Cap during a World Cup Qualifying Match on 13 November 2021 against Belarus at the Cardiff City Stadium where he played 45 minutes being substituted at half time.

==== Euro 2016 campaign ====
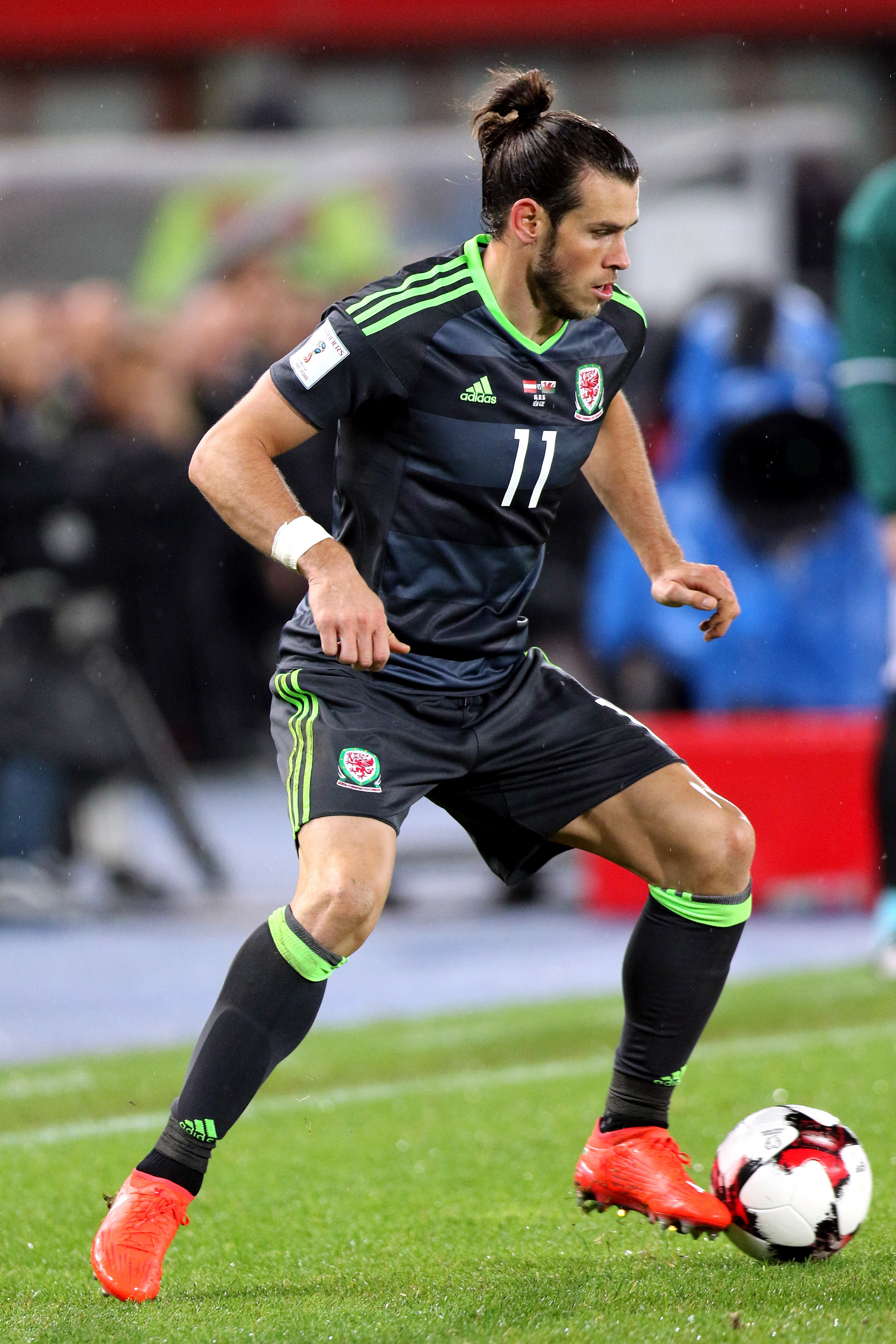
Bale playing for Wales in a qualifying match against Austria in October 2016

On 9 September 2014, Bale scored two goals, one with a header and another with a free kick, as Wales beat Andorra 2–1 in their first match of the UEFA Euro 2016 qualifying campaign. In doing so, he became Wales' joint 10th all-time top-scorer with 14 goals, alongside John Hartson. Bale scored two goals on 28 March 2015, in a 3–0 win away in Israel. On 12 June, his 50th cap, he scored the only goal to defeat Belgium in a home qualifier, taking Wales above the Belgians to the top of Group B. He headed Jazz Richards' cross on 3 September in a 1–0 away win over Cyprus, putting Wales three points away from qualification. With qualification to UEFA Euro 2016 achieved (the country's first major finals since the 1958 FIFA World Cup), on 13 October 2015, Bale scored his seventh goal of the qualifying campaign in Wales' final qualifier against Andorra at the Cardiff City Stadium.

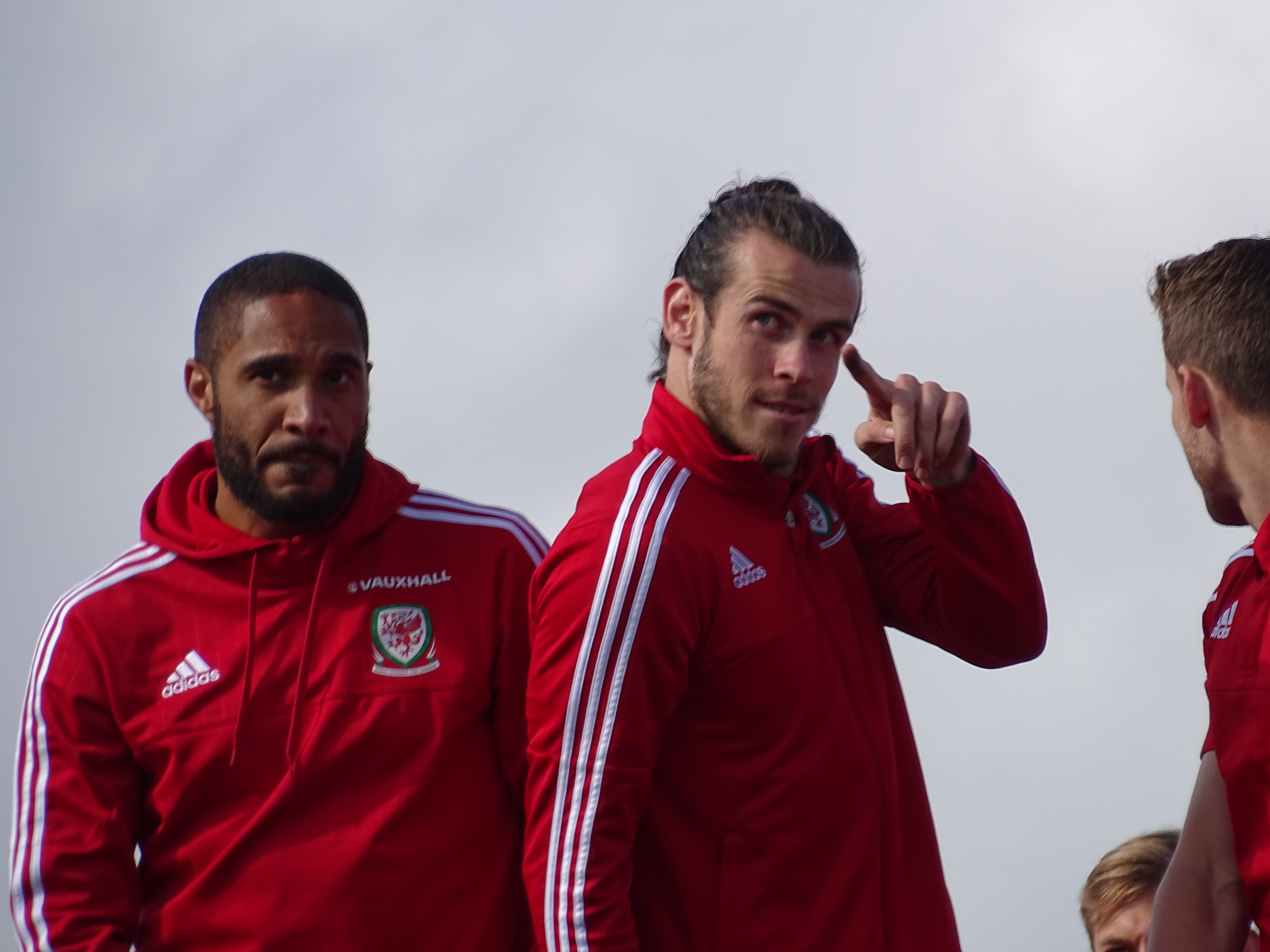
Bale with Ashley Williams (left) at the July 2016 homecoming event in Cardiff. With thousands of supporters observing, Bale described the event as "very special" in a BBC interview.

On 11 June, Bale scored the first goal in Wales' clash with Slovakia in their opening game of UEFA Euro 2016 from a free kick, helping his country secure a 2–1 win and, in the process, lead them to their first win in a tournament in 58 years. His goal saw him become the first Welsh player to score at a major international tournament since Terry Medwin's goal against Hungary at the 1958 FIFA World Cup. He then followed this up by scoring another opening free kick goal against England in the second group game, though Wales went on to lose the game 2–1; this made Bale the first player to score two free kicks at a European Championship since Germany's Thomas Häßler in 1992. Bale scored his third goal of the tournament in a 3–0 win over Russia, making him their all-time top scorer in major tournaments, ahead of Ivor Allchurch who scored twice in the 1958 World Cup; he also helped to create the second goal of the match, which was scored by Neil Taylor. In the last 16 against Northern Ireland at the Parc des Princes, Bale sent in the cross from which Gareth McAuley scored an own goal to give the Welsh victory. After defeating Belgium in the quarter-final, Wales were eliminated following a 2–0 defeat to eventual champions Portugal in the semi-final.

On 5 September 2016, Bale scored twice in a 4–0 win over Moldova in a 2018 FIFA World Cup qualification game. This brought him to 24 international goals, surpassing both Ivor Allchurch and Trevor Ford, and behind only Ian Rush's 28. On 22 March 2018, with 29 goals, Bale became Wales' all-time top-scorer surpassing Ian Rush's 28, thanks to his first hat-trick in his international career in a 2018 China Cup match against China.

==== Euro 2020 campaign ====
In May 2021, he was selected as captain of the Wales squad for the delayed UEFA Euro 2020 tournament. At the finals, he provided the assists for Aaron Ramsey and Connor Roberts's goals in Wales's second group match on 16 June, a 2–0 win over Turkey; he helped his country qualify for the round of 16, in which they were beaten 4–0 by Denmark.

==== World Cup 2022 campaign ====
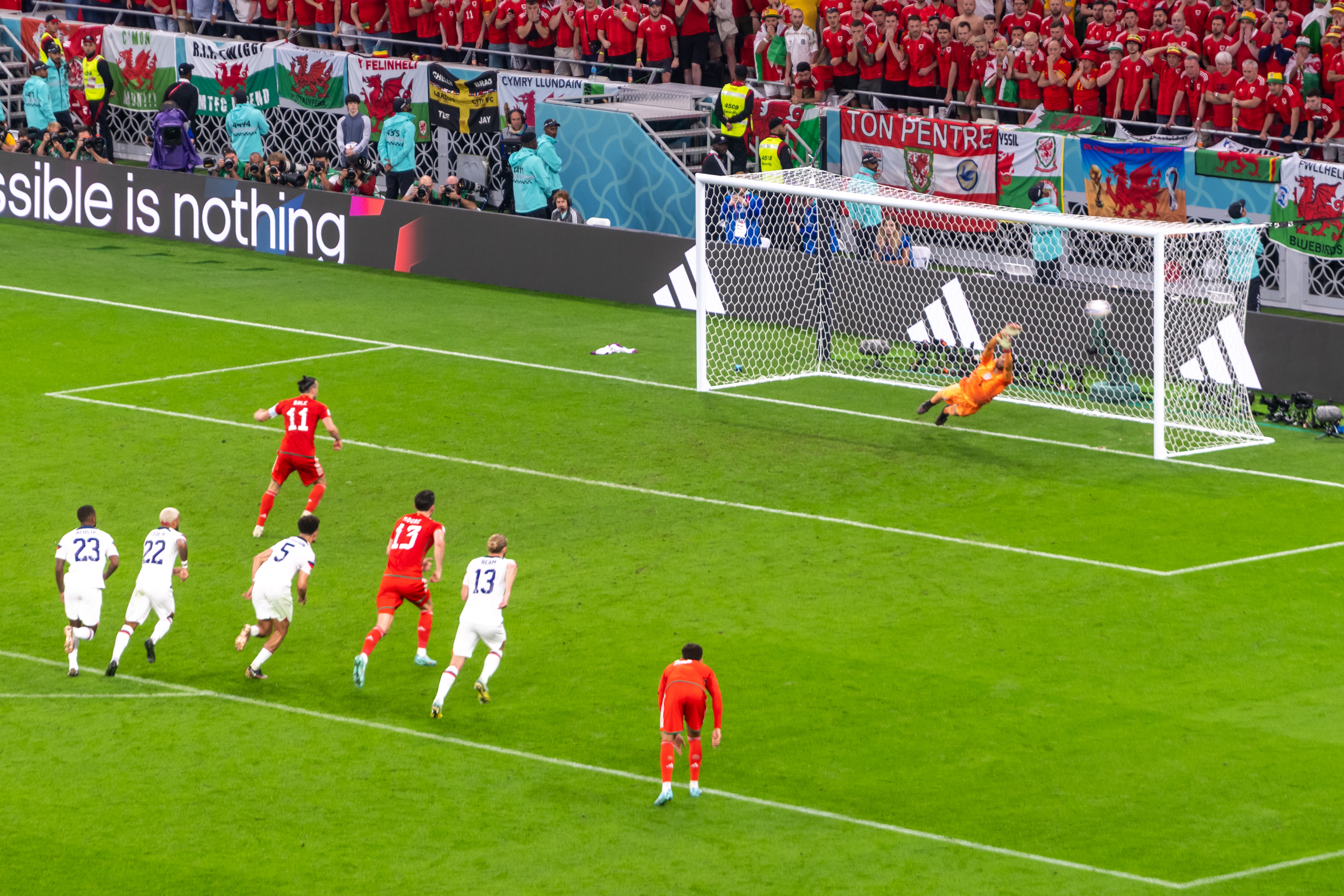
Bale scores Wales's first World Cup goal since 1958 from the penalty spot.

On 24 March 2022, Bale scored two goals in the 2022 FIFA World Cup qualifying playoff semi-finals in a 2–1 win against Austria which sent Wales to the playoff final. In the playoff final against Ukraine on 5 June, delayed due to Russia's invasion of Ukraine earlier in the year, Bale's free-kick was deflected into the net by Ukraine captain Andriy Yarmolenko, giving Wales the lone goal in a 1–0 victory. Initially credited as an own goal for Yarmolenko, the decisive goal was subsequently awarded to Bale at the end of June. Wales qualified for the World Cup for the first time since 1958. Bale called it "the greatest result in history for Welsh football," and further that it "means everything. It's what dreams are made of." Bale, as captain led the Welsh team in singing along to the unofficial anthem of the team, "Yma o Hyd," which was performed live by Dafydd Iwan after the final whistle. After the match, The Guardian opined on the occasion that "what can be said now is that nobody has ever achieved more in a Wales shirt."

In November 2022, Bale was named in the Wales squad for the 2022 FIFA World Cup in Qatar. In the team's opening group stage game against the United States, Bale was awarded a penalty kick after being fouled in the box with Wales 1–0 down and converted to equalise the game. This was the first goal scored by Wales in a World Cup since 1958, and earned Bale's side a draw. This proved to be Wales's only point and goal of the tournament as they finished last in Group B and were eliminated in the first round. Bale's final appearance as a professional footballer was Wales' final group game, a 3–0 loss to England.

=== Great Britain ===
Bale, who met the age criteria to play in the 2012 London Olympics, said in May 2011 "I want to play in the Olympics" for the Great Britain Olympic football team, in defiance of the FAW. On 28 October 2011, Bale became the first player to be photographed modelling the British 2012 London Olympics football supporters' shirt. In response, FAW chief executive Jonathan Ford said: "Our position remains unchanged. We are not for Team GB. Gareth can make his own choices and make his own decisions. But we are not going to stop anyone playing." On behalf of Bale, a spokesman said "while he is 100% Welsh, he is also British".

At the end of June 2012, Bale pulled out of the tournament with a back injury. On 29 June, he advised the Team GB football manager, Stuart Pearce, that he would not be available for selection as he had aggravated an old back and hip injury during a training run. In view of the short recovery time between the end of the Olympics and the start of the Premier League season, Bale had decided to withdraw rather than exacerbate the problem. Bale recovered from his injury in good time to be included on Spurs' pre-season tour of the United States, scoring against LA Galaxy on 24 July and against New York Red Bulls a week later. Between these matches, Bale also played against Liverpool when he was injured in a tackle by Charlie Adam.

Bale's appearances in Spurs' pre-season tour coincided with Team GB's Olympic matches, where they drew with Senegal before victories over the United Arab Emirates and Uruguay took them through to the knockout stages, where they lost to South Korea following a penalty shoot-out. Bale's withdrawal from the Team GB squad attracted calls for sanctions against him including a ban from the rest of Spurs' pre-season tour but, in the absence of an official complaint by Team GB, these were not carried out. Spurs' manager, André Villas-Boas, defended the player insisting that Bale "had recovered quicker than expected". The club's stance was supported by British Olympic Association chairman Lord Moynihan.

Tottenham released a statement in relation to Bale's non-selection for Team GB, stating that "Gareth sustained an injury as he built up his fitness ahead of joining up with Stuart Pearce's side. MRI scan reports were sent to the FA medical team on 29 June 2012. He was subsequently not selected on the basis of this injury and the inability to predict recovery time. This decision was not taken lightly and made only after consultation with Team GB's medical team, who were in agreement after seeing the medical reports."

== Player profile ==
=== Style of play ===
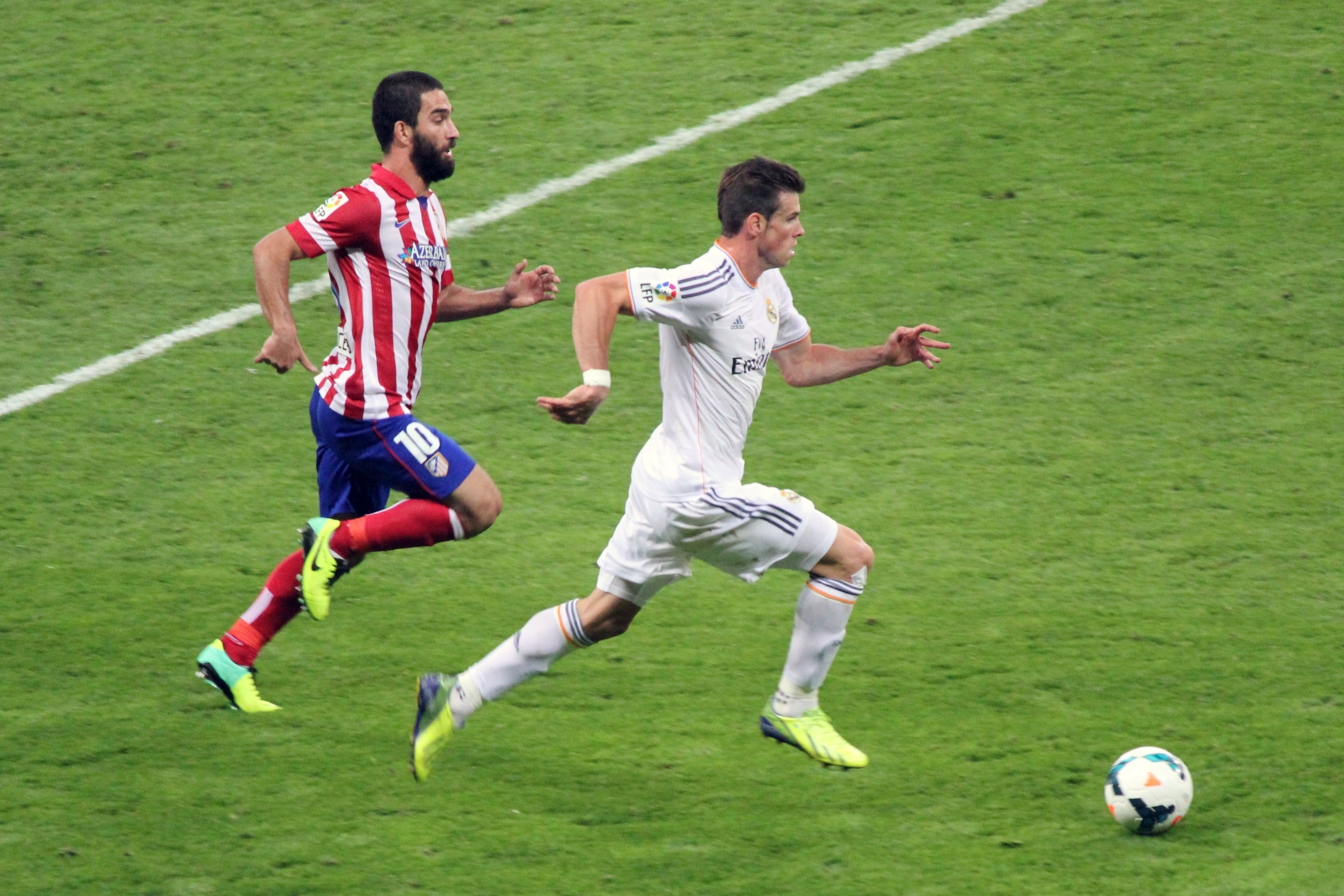
Bale (pictured in 2013) was best known for his pace, athleticism and bending strikes from distance (often using the "knuckleball" technique) in his prime.

At the beginning of his career, Bale played as a left-back. When Bale moved to Tottenham, his coach Harry Redknapp played him as a left winger, where he developed into a world-class player. He was predominantly known for his pace, acceleration, shooting and heading. His pace, physicality qualities, and acceleration allowed him to regularly get past defenders and make runs into space, where he was able to score or create goals. Bale was a free-kick specialist and used the "knuckleball" technique (popularised by Juninho Pernambucano). In addition to his athletic and offensive capabilities, Bale was praised by the media for his defensive work-rate.

As Bale developed into one of the most dangerous left wingers in the world, he was praised by managers, current players, and past players such as Luís Figo, José Mourinho and Dani Alves. Bale has been described as a footballer with "tremendous speed, great crossing ability, a great left foot and exceptional physical qualities". Former Liverpool player and BBC Sport football pundit Mark Lawrenson said in 2011: "What makes Gareth Bale so special? Simple. He is one of the quickest players I've ever seen, but he has another gear and the ability to find that extra pace within the next stride. He has the ability to perform and use his technique at great pace."

During the 2011–12 season, Harry Redknapp experimented with using Bale as an attacking midfielder. The following season, André Villas-Boas frequently used Bale in this role. After joining Real Madrid, Bale played as a right winger due to Cristiano Ronaldo playing on the left, which allowed him to cut into the centre and strike the ball with his stronger left foot; he was also used as a striker courtesy of his goalscoring, off-the-ball movement, and physicality; however, his playing time during his later seasons with Real Madrid was limited due to injuries.

=== Reception ===
The Welsh public are so grateful to have a Gareth Bale that they don't put that pressure on him, they're just so happy we have a player of that quality that they build him up but not in a way to knock him down. Even if Gareth had the worst game of his life, scored a couple of own goals and got sent off, Welsh fans would never lambast him. They appreciate that we are fortunate, as a small country, to have a superstar.

— Wayne Hennessey

Bale is widely regarded as one of the greatest players of his generation and as one of the greatest Welsh and British players of all time. After a Champions League group stage match against Inter Milan on 2 November 2010, his teammate Rafael van der Vaart said, "Everyone is scared of him (Bale). Maicon is one of the best defenders in the world, and he's killed him." El Mundo praising Bale for his performance wrote, "Bale combines the height and build of an 800-metre runner like Steve Ovett with the acceleration and directness of a rugby winger like Bryan Habana. And, when he gets to the byline, he delivers curling crosses like a Brazilian".

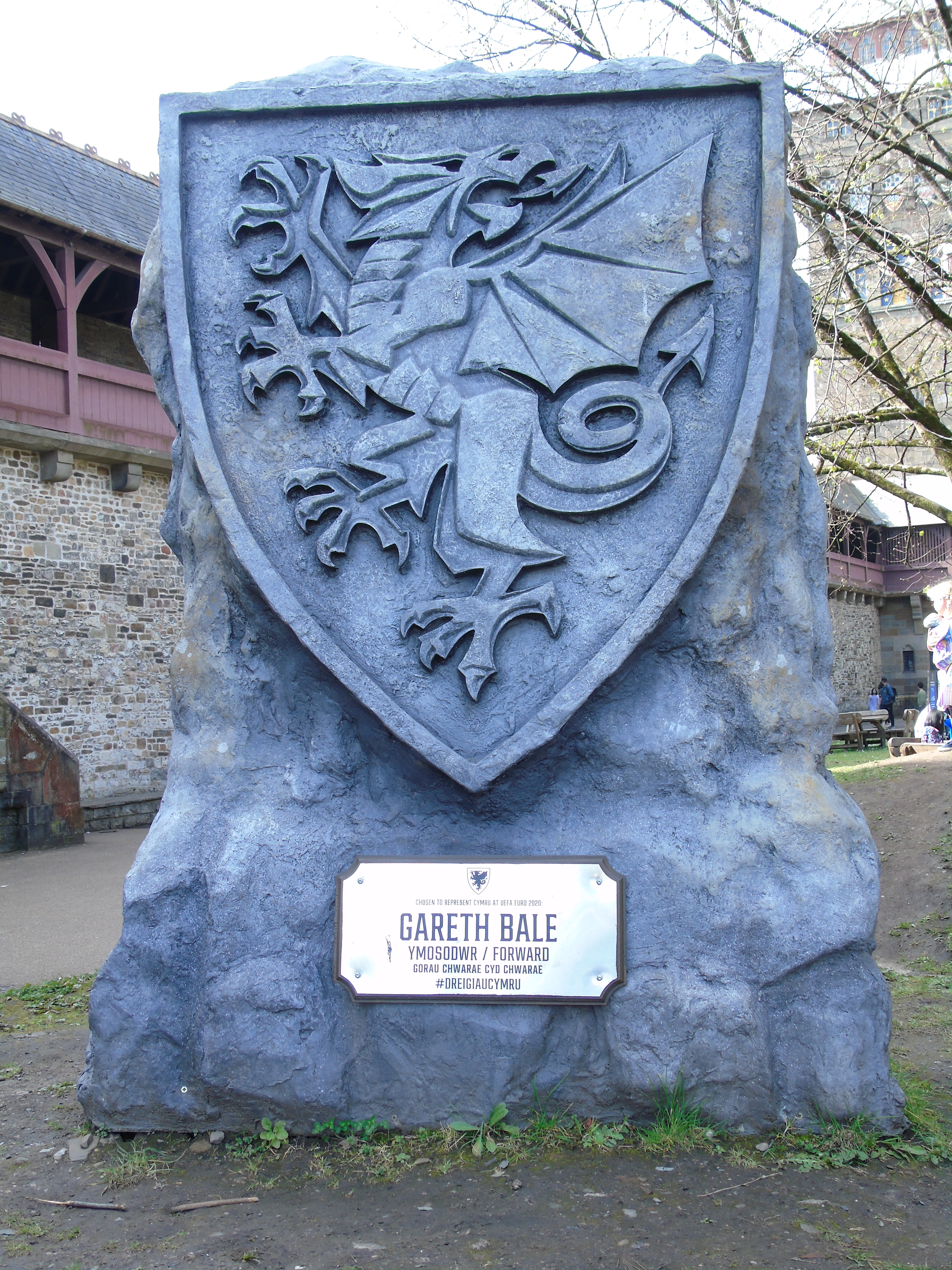
Bale plaque at Cardiff Castle

According to his Wales teammates, Bale was a pivotal and influential figure for the squad. Welsh international Neil Taylor spoke about Bale's positive influence on the team's psyche and performance, "There's a belief about the team when he's in it. He makes everyone around him play better."

In October 2012, Harry Redknapp mentioned him in the same class as Cristiano Ronaldo and Lionel Messi. He said: "He's an amazing, amazing talent and he's after the Ronaldos and Messis of this world and he's getting better and better. He's almost unplayable when he's on his game. He is a genuine world-class player. There's nobody he couldn't play for. He'd improve any team."

Bale was accused of diving by some in the British media; however, this was denied by Bale, Harry Redknapp, and Wales coach Chris Coleman. On 29 December 2012, Bale picked up his third yellow card for simulation in the 2012–13 season. During his Premier League tenure, he was booked eight times for simulation. In 2016, The Guardian listed him as the seventh-best footballer in the world.

During his time at Real Madrid, Bale was praised by the media for his high quality and decisive performances in important matches. However, Bale became less popular with Madrid's fans during his final seasons with the club due to his supposed lack of commitment. Moreover, he was criticised for failing to live up to his potential due to his injuries.

== Outside football ==
=== Personal life ===
Bale lives in Madrid with his partner Emma Rhys-Jones, his high-school sweetheart. Their first two children were born in Cardiff: one on 21 October 2012 and the other on 22 March 2016. On 17 July 2016, Bale announced his engagement with Rhys-Jones. On 9 March 2018, Bale announced that he and his fiancée were expecting their third child. On 8 May 2018, the couple announced the birth of their third child. They married in June 2019.

Bale was appointed Member of the Order of the British Empire (MBE) in the 2022 Birthday Honours for his contributions to association football and various charities.

Bale is teetotal. In 2024, he promoted Heineken 0.0 for Dry January.

Bale is not a fluent Welsh speaker, only knowing simple Welsh phrases. While at Real Madrid, he was criticised by the Spanish media for allegedly not learning the Spanish language, an accusation that his agent denied.

=== Endorsements ===
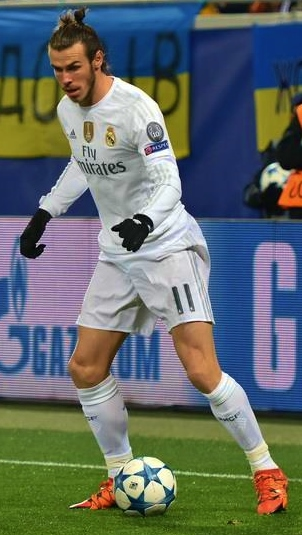
Bale wearing Adidas X15 football boots in 2015

On 26 March 2013, Bale filed an application with the Intellectual Property Office to create a logo based on his heart-shaped goal celebration along with his squad number (11) to be used on merchandise. Bale was featured in EA Sports' FIFA video game series and he appeared on the British, Irish and Middle Eastern covers of FIFA 14 alongside Lionel Messi. His goal celebration is featured in FIFA 14.

Bale has partnerships with companies such as Adidas, EA Sports, Lucozade and BT Sport. In 2014, Bale was the first player to wear the Adidas F50 crazylight football boots. In 2015, he unveiled the Adidas X15 football boots.

Bale has over 45 million Instagram followers and earns $185,000 per sponsored post, the second-highest paid British person after David Beckham. In 2016, ESPN ranked Bale twelfth on its list of the world's most famous athletes.

=== Philanthropy ===
In November 2014, Bale appeared in FIFA's "11 against Ebola" campaign along with other football legends like Cristiano Ronaldo, Neymar, Xavi, and Didier Drogba. Under the slogan "Together, we can beat Ebola", FIFA's campaign was done in conjunction with the Confederation of African Football and health experts, with the players holding up eleven messages to raise awareness of and combat the disease.

In April 2020, he and his wife Emma donated £1 million to health boards in Wales and Spain to help in the fight against the COVID-19 pandemic. In October 2020, Bale gave £15,000 for Christmas hampers in Swansea, Wales.

=== Golf ===
Bale is a keen golfer and in his back garden, he has a replica of the 17th hole – the Island Green – at TPC at Sawgrass. This hobby became controversial in his final seasons at Real Madrid, with the perception that Bale was more interested in golf than football. El Confidencial cited golf as the reason why Bale spent so much time out injured, claiming it worsened his back problems. Bale humorously played-up to this reputation, as after he qualified for the Euro 2020 tournament with Wales, he celebrated behind a Welsh flag with the slogan "Wales. Golf. Madrid. In that order" written on it. Bale was interviewed in Episode 179 of The Erik Anders Lang Show podcast, in which he said his golf handicap was "between a three and a four". Bale competed alongside American professional golfer Joseph Bramlett in the February 2023 edition of the AT&T Pebble Beach Pro-Am in California. The two of them placed joint-16th in the amateur section of the competition. His handicap was 0.1 as of October 2025.

== Career statistics ==
=== Club ===
Appearances and goals by club, season and competition
Club	Season	League			National cup (Note: Includes FA Cup, Copa del Rey)		League cup (Note: Includes Football League/EFL Cup)		Continental		Other		Total	
Club	Season	Division	Apps	Goals	Apps	Goals	Apps	Goals	Apps	Goals	Apps	Goals	Apps	Goals
Southampton	2005–06	Championship	2	0	0	0	0	0	—		—		2	0
Southampton	2006–07	Championship	38	5	1	0	3	0	—		1 (Note: Appearance in Championship play-offs)	0	43	5
Southampton	Total		40	5	1	0	3	0	—		1	0	45	5
Tottenham Hotspur	2007–08	Premier League	8	2	0	0	1	1	3 (Note: Appearances in UEFA Cup)	0	—		12	3
Tottenham Hotspur	2008–09	Premier League	16	0	2	0	5	0	7	0	—		30	0
Tottenham Hotspur	2009–10	Premier League	23	3	8	0	3	0	—		—		34	3
Tottenham Hotspur	2010–11	Premier League	30	7	0	0	0	0	11 (Note: Appearances in UEFA Champions League)	4	—		41	11
Tottenham Hotspur	2011–12	Premier League	36	9	4	2	0	0	2 (Note: Appearances in UEFA Europa League)	1	—		42	12
Tottenham Hotspur	2012–13	Premier League	33	21	2	1	1	1	8	3	—		44	26
Tottenham Hotspur	Total		146	42	16	3	10	2	31	8	—		203	55
Real Madrid	2013–14	La Liga	27	15	5	1	—		12	6	—		44	22
Real Madrid	2014–15	La Liga	31	13	2	0	—		10	2	5 (Note: One appearance in UEFA Super Cup, two appearances in Supercopa de España, two appearances and two goals in FIFA Club World Cup)	2	48	17
Real Madrid	2015–16	La Liga	23	19	0	0	—		8	0	—		31	19
Real Madrid	2016–17	La Liga	19	7	0	0	—		8	2	0	0	27	9
Real Madrid	2017–18	La Liga	26	16	2	1	—		7	3	4 (Note: One appearance in UEFA Super Cup, one appearance in Supercopa de España, two appearances and one goal in FIFA Club World Cup)	1	39	21
Real Madrid	2018–19	La Liga	29	8	3	0	—		7	3	3 (Note: One appearance in UEFA Super Cup, two appearances and three goals in FIFA Club World Cup)	3	42	14
Real Madrid	2019–20	La Liga	16	2	1	1	—		3	0	0	0	20	3
Real Madrid	2021–22	La Liga	5	1	0	0	—		2	0	0	0	7	1
Real Madrid	Total		176	81	13	3	—		57	16	12	6	258	106
Tottenham Hotspur (loan)	2020–21	Premier League	20	11	2	1	2	1	10	3	—		34	16
Los Angeles	2022	MLS	12	2	—		—		—		1 (Note: Appearance in MLS Cup playoffs)	1	13	3
Career total			394	141	32	7	15	3	98	27	14	7	553	185

=== International ===
Appearances and goals by national team and year
National team	Year	Apps	Goals
Wales	2006	4	1
Wales	2007	7	1
Wales	2008	5	0
Wales	2009	7	0
Wales	2010	4	1
Wales	2011	6	3
Wales	2012	5	3
Wales	2013	5	2
Wales	2014	5	3
Wales	2015	6	5
Wales	2016	11	7
Wales	2017	3	0
Wales	2018	6	5
Wales	2019	9	2
Wales	2020	4	0
Wales	2021	13	3
Wales	2022	11	5
Total		111	41

== Honours ==
Tottenham Hotspur

- Football League Cup: 2007–08; runner-up: 2008–09, 2020–21

Real Madrid

- La Liga: 2016–17, 2019–20, 2021–22
- Copa del Rey: 2013–14
- Supercopa de España: 2017
- UEFA Champions League: 2013–14, 2015–16, 2016–17, 2017–18, 2021–22
- UEFA Super Cup: 2014, 2016, 2017
- FIFA Club World Cup: 2014, 2017, 2018

Los Angeles FC

- MLS Cup: 2022
- Supporters' Shield: 2022

Individual

- Tottenham Hotspur Young Player of the Year: 2009–10, 2010–11, 2012–13
- Tottenham Hotspur Player of the Year: 2012–13
- UEFA Team of the Year: 2011, 2013
- UEFA Champions League Squad of the Season: 2015–16
- Welsh Footballer of the Year: 2010, 2011, 2013, 2014, 2015, 2016
- ESM Team of the Year: 2012–13
- The Football League Team of the Decade
- PFA Team of the Year: 2006–07 Championship, 2010–11 Premier League, 2011–12 Premier League, 2012–13 Premier League
- PFA Players' Player of the Year: 2010–11, 2012–13
- PFA Young Player of the Year: 2012–13
- FWA Footballer of the Year: 2012–13
- Premier League Player of the Season: 2012–13
- UEFA Champions League Goal of the Season: 2017–18
- FIFA Club World Cup Golden Ball: 2018
- BBC Wales Carwyn James Junior Sportsman of the Year: 2006
- Football Association of Wales Young Player of the Year: 2007
- BBC Wales Sports Personality of the Year: 2010

Orders

- Member of the Order of the British Empire (MBE): 2022

== See also ==
- List of top international men's football goal scorers by country
- List of men's footballers with 100 or more international caps
