= 2012 Algarve Cup squads =

This article lists the squads for the 2012 Algarve Cup, held in Portugal. The 12 national teams involved in the tournament were required to register a squad of 21 players; only players in these squads were eligible to take part in the tournament.

Players marked (c) were named as captain for their national squad. Number of caps, players' club teams and players' age as of 29 February 2012 – the tournament's opening day.

== Group A ==
=== Germany ===
Coach: Silvia Neid

No.	Pos.	Player	Date of birth (age)	Caps	Goals	Club
1	GK	Nadine Angerer (c)	10 November 1978 (aged 33)	107	0	(Germany) 1. FFC Frankfurt
2	DF	Bianca Schmidt	23 January 1990 (aged 22)	21	0	(Germany) 1. FFC Turbine Potsdam
3	DF	Saskia Bartusiak	9 September 1982 (aged 29)	50	0	(Germany) 1. FFC Frankfurt
4	DF	Babett Peter	12 May 1988 (aged 23)	60	4	(Germany) 1. FFC Turbine Potsdam
5	DF	Annike Krahn	1 July 1985 (aged 26)	74	4	(Germany) FCR 2001 Duisburg
7	MF	Melanie Behringer	18 November 1985 (aged 26)	74	21	(Germany) 1. FFC Frankfurt
9	FW	Alexandra Popp	6 April 1991 (aged 20)	22	14	(Germany) FCR 2001 Duisburg
10	MF	Linda Bresonik	7 December 1983 (aged 28)	72	7	(Germany) FCR 2001 Duisburg
11	FW	Anja Mittag	16 May 1985 (aged 26)	71	11	(Sweden) LdB FC Malmö
12	GK	Almuth Schult	9 February 1991 (aged 21)	1	0	(Germany) SC 07 Bad Neuenahr
13	MF	Célia Okoyino da Mbabi	27 June 1988 (aged 23)	62	17	(Germany) SC 07 Bad Neuenahr
14	MF	Dzsenifer Marozsán	18 April 1992 (aged 19)	4	1	(Germany) 1. FFC Frankfurt
15	DF	Verena Faißt	22 May 1989 (aged 22)	8	0	(Germany) VfL Wolfsburg
16	MF	Lena Lotzen	11 September 1993 (aged 18)	0	0	(Germany) FC Bayern Munich
17	MF	Viola Odebrecht	11 February 1983 (aged 29)	33	1	(Germany) 1. FFC Turbine Potsdam
18	MF	Svenja Huth	25 January 1991 (aged 21)	2	0	(Germany) 1. FFC Frankfurt
19	MF	Fatmire Bajramaj	1 April 1988 (aged 23)	55	12	(Germany) 1. FFC Frankfurt
20	MF	Lena Goeßling	8 March 1986 (aged 25)	31	2	(Germany) VfL Wolfsburg
21	GK	Kathrin Längert	14 December 1991 (aged 20)	0	0	(Germany) FC Bayern Munich
22	DF	Tabea Kemme	8 September 1989 (aged 22)	0	0	(Germany) 1. FFC Turbine Potsdam
23	DF	Josephine Henning	8 September 1989 (aged 22)	2	0	(Germany) VfL Wolfsburg

== Group B ==
=== Japan ===
Coach: Norio Sasaki

No.	Pos.	Player	Date of birth (age)	Caps	Goals	Club
1	GK	Ayumi Kaihori	4 September 1986 (aged 25)	27	0	(Japan) INAC Leonessa
2	DF	Yukari Kinga	2 May 1984 (aged 27)	72	4	(Japan) INAC Leonessa
3	DF	Azusa Iwashimizu	14 October 1986 (aged 25)	74	8	(Japan) NTV Beleza
4	DF	Saki Kumagai	17 October 1990 (aged 21)	33	0	(Germany) 1. FFC Frankfurt
5	DF	Aya Sameshima	16 June 1987 (aged 24)	38	2	(France) Montpellier HSC
6	MF	Mizuho Sakaguchi	15 October 1987 (aged 24)	47	16	(Japan) NTV Beleza
7	FW	Kozue Ando	9 July 1982 (aged 29)	97	17	(Germany) FCR 2001 Duisburg
8	MF	Aya Miyama (c)	28 January 1985 (aged 27)	104	26	(Japan) Okayama Yunogo Belle
9	MF	Nahomi Kawasumi	23 September 1985 (aged 26)	23	6	(Japan) INAC Leonessa
10	MF	Homare Sawa	6 September 1978 (aged 33)	176	80	(Japan) INAC Leonessa
11	FW	Shinobu Ohno	23 January 1984 (aged 28)	97	36	(Japan) INAC Leonessa
12	GK	Miho Fukumoto	2 October 1983 (aged 28)	56	0	(Japan) Okayama Yunogo Belle
13	DF	Rumi Utsugi	5 December 1988 (aged 23)	47	5	(France) Montpellier HSC
14	DF	Asuna Tanaka	23 April 1988 (aged 23)	6	2	(Japan) INAC Leonessa
15	DF	Saori Ariyoshi	1 November 1987 (aged 24)	0	0	(Japan) NTV Beleza
16	MF	Kanako Itō	20 July 1983 (aged 28)	9	2	(Japan) NTV Beleza
17	FW	Yūki Nagasato	15 July 1987 (aged 24)	75	32	(Germany) 1. FFC Turbine Potsdam
18	MF	Nanase Kiryū	31 October 1989 (aged 22)	3	0	(Japan) NTV Beleza
19	FW	Megumi Takase	10 November 1990 (aged 21)	19	4	(Japan) INAC Leonessa
20	FW	Yuika Sugasawa	5 October 1990 (aged 21)	6	0	(Japan) Albirex Niigata Ladies
21	FW	Mai Kyōkawa	28 December 1993 (aged 18)	0	0	(Japan) INAC Leonessa

=== Norway ===
Coach: Eli Landsem

No.	Pos.	Player	Date of birth (age)	Caps	Goals	Club
	GK	Ingrid Hjelmseth	10 April 1980 (aged 31)	52	0	(Norway) Stabæk
	GK	Christine Colombo Nilsen	30 April 1982 (aged 29)	9	0	(Norway) Vålerenga
	DF	Maren Mjelde	6 November 1989 (aged 22)	39	1	(Norway) Arna-Bjørnar
		Toril Hetland Akerhaugen	5 March 1982 (aged 29)	30	0	(Norway) Stabæk
	MF	Leni Larsen Kaurin	21 March 1981 (aged 30)	83	4	(Germany) VfL Wolfsburg
	MF	Gry Tofte Ims	2 March 1986 (aged 25)	14	1	(Norway) Klepp
	MF	Ingvild Stensland	3 August 1981 (aged 30)	110	7	(Norway) Stabæk
	DF	Trine Bjerke Rønning	14 June 1982 (aged 29)	119	20	(Norway) Stabæk
	FW	Emilie Haavi	16 June 1992 (aged 19)	14	5	(Norway) Røa
9	FW	Isabell Herlovsen	23 June 1988 (aged 23)	71	22	(Norway) Lillestrøm
	FW	Elise Thorsnes	14 August 1988 (aged 23)	46	7	(Norway) Røa
	FW	Cecilie Pedersen	14 September 1990 (aged 21)	24	8	(Norway) Lillestrøm
	DF	Melissa Wiik	7 February 1985 (aged 27)	58	15	(Norway) Stabæk
	MF	Marita Skammelsrud Lund	29 January 1989 (aged 23)	27	2	(Norway) Lillestrøm
	MF	Madeleine Giske	14 September 1987 (aged 24)	22	1	(Norway) Røa
	FW	Ingvild Isaksen	10 February 1989 (aged 23)	14	0	(Norway) Kolbotn
	MF	Kristine Wigdahl Hegland	8 August 1992 (aged 19)	4	0	(Norway) Arna-Bjornar
	DF	Nora Holstad Berge	26 March 1987 (aged 24)	9	0	(Sweden) Linköpings FC
	GK	Caroline Knutsen	21 November 1983 (aged 28)	5	0	(Norway) Røa
		Caroline Graham Hansen	18 February 1995 (aged 17)	3	0	(Norway) Stabæk
		Ingrid Moe Wold	29 January 1990 (aged 22)	1	0	(Norway) Lillestrøm

=== United States ===
Coach: (Sweden) Pia Sundhage

No.	Pos.	Player	Date of birth (age)	Caps	Goals	Club
1	GK	Hope Solo	30 July 1981 (aged 30)	104	0	Unattached
2	DF	Heather Mitts	9 June 1978 (aged 33)	119	2	Unattached
3	DF	Christie Rampone (c)	24 June 1975 (aged 36)	245	4	Unattached
4	DF	Becky Sauerbrunn	6 June 1985 (aged 26)	15	0	(United States) Sky Blue FC
5	DF	Kelley O'Hara	4 August 1988 (aged 23)	7	0	(United States) Atlanta Beat
6	DF	Amy LePeilbet	12 March 1982 (aged 29)	57	0	(United States) Atlanta Beat
7	MF	Shannon Boxx	29 June 1977 (aged 34)	154	22	Unattached
8	MF	Amy Rodriguez	17 February 1987 (aged 25)	74	22	Unattached
9	MF	Heather O'Reilly	2 January 1985 (aged 27)	153	33	(United States) Sky Blue FC
10	MF	Carli Lloyd	16 July 1982 (aged 29)	120	29	(United States) Atlanta Beat
12	FW	Lauren Cheney	30 September 1987 (aged 24)	52	17	Unattached
13	FW	Alex Morgan	2 July 1989 (aged 22)	28	10	(United States) Western New York Flash
11	FW	Sydney Leroux	7 May 1990 (aged 21)	1	0	(United States) Atlanta Beat
15	MF	Megan Rapinoe	5 July 1985 (aged 26)	39	11	Unattached
16	MF	Lori Lindsey	19 March 1980 (aged 31)	24	0	(United States) Western New York Flash
17	MF	Tobin Heath	29 May 1988 (aged 23)	35	4	Unattached
18	GK	Nicole Barnhart	10 October 1981 (aged 30)	41	0	Unattached
19	DF	Rachel Buehler	26 August 1985 (aged 26)	68	3	(United States) Atlanta Beat
20	FW	Abby Wambach	2 June 1980 (aged 31)	167	125	Unattached
	DF	Whitney Engen	28 November 1987 (aged 24)	0	0	(United States) Western New York Flash
	DF	Meghan Klingenberg	2 August 1988 (aged 23)	2	0	(United States) Boston Breakers
	DF	Heather Mitts	9 June 1978 (aged 33)	121	2	(United States) Atlanta Beat
	DF	Stephanie Cox	3 April 1986 (aged 25)	78	0	(United States) Boston Breakers

== Group C ==
=== Hungary ===
Coach: László Kiss

No.	Pos.	Player	Date of birth (age)	Caps	Goals	Club
99	GK	Réka Szőcs	19 November 1989 (aged 22)	23	0	(Hungary) MTK Hungária FC
12	GK	Eszter Papp	12 September 1989 (aged 22)	5	0	(Hungary) Viktória FC
	GK	Klaudia Kovács	17 November 1990 (aged 21)	4	0	Astra Hungary FC
9	DF	Szilvia Szeitl	26 April 1987 (aged 24)	28	0	(Hungary) 1. FC Femina
18	DF	Szabina Tálosi	20 January 1989 (aged 23)	27	2	(Hungary) Viktória FC
4	DF	Alexandra Tóth II	29 January 1991 (aged 21)	22	0	(Hungary) Viktória FC
33	DF	Boglárka Megyeri	19 July 1987 (aged 24)	10	1	(Hungary) Viktória FC
5	DF	Tímea Gál	25 September 1984 (aged 27)	34	0	(Hungary) MTK Hungária FC
28	DF	Boglárka Szabó	12 February 1993 (aged 19)	6	0	Astra Hungary FC
26	MF	Réka Demeter	26 September 1991 (aged 20)	13	0	(Hungary) MTK Hungária FC
6	MF	Angéla Smuczer	11 February 1982 (aged 30)	65	1	(Hungary) MTK Hungária FC
30	MF	Dóra Papp	5 January 1991 (aged 21)	9	1	(Hungary) MTK Hungária FC
3	MF	Henrietta Csiszár	15 May 1994 (aged 17)	0	0	(Hungary) Ferencváros
27	MF	Lilla Sipos	14 July 1992 (aged 19)	12	3	(Hungary) Viktória FC
15	MF	Zsófia Rácz	28 December 1988 (aged 23)	27	2	(Hungary) Viktória FC
23	MF	Erika Szuh	21 February 1990 (aged 22)	12	1	(Germany) 1. FC Lokomotive Leipzig
8	FW	Anita Pádár	30 March 1979 (aged 32)	89	31	(Hungary) MTK Hungária FC
11	FW	Anett Dombai-Nagy	1 November 1979 (aged 32)	61	28	Astra Hungary FC
25	FW	Katalin Fogl	7 November 1983 (aged 28)	22	3	Astra Hungary FC
10	FW	Fanny Vágó	23 July 1991 (aged 20)	30	13	(Hungary) MTK Hungária FC
21	FW	Bernadett Zágor	31 January 1990 (aged 22)	13	1	(Hungary) MTK Hungária FC

=== Republic of Ireland ===
Coach: Susan Ronan

No.	Pos.	Player	Date of birth (age)	Caps	Goals	Club
	GK	Emma Byrne	14 June 1979 (aged 32)			(England) Arsenal
	GK	Eve Badana	9 July 1993 (aged 18)	0	0	(United States) Drexel Dragons
	GK	Grace Moloney	1 March 1993 (aged 18)	0	0	(England) Reading
	DF	Yvonne Tracy	27 February 1981 (aged 31)			(England) Arsenal
	DF	Louise Quinn	17 June 1990 (aged 21)			(Republic of Ireland) Peamount United
	DF	Megan Campbell	28 June 1993 (aged 18)			(Republic of Ireland) Raheny United
	DF	Sophie Perry	11 November 1986 (aged 25)	0	0	(England) Chelsea
	DF	Méabh De Búrca	11 August 1988 (aged 23)			(Norway) Amazon Grimstad
	DF	Niamh Fahey	13 October 1987 (aged 24)			(England) Arsenal
	MF	Ciara Grant (c)	17 May 1978 (aged 33)			(England) Arsenal
	MF	Dora Gorman	18 February 1993 (aged 19)	1	0	(Republic of Ireland) Peamount United
	MF	Marie Curtin	7 August 1985 (aged 26)			(Republic of Ireland) Cork Women
	MF	Julie-Ann Russell	28 March 1991 (aged 20)			(England) Doncaster Rovers Belles
	FW	Aine O'Gorman	13 May 1989 (aged 22)			(England) Doncaster Rovers Belles
	FW	Stephanie Roche	13 June 1989 (aged 22)			(Republic of Ireland) Peamount United
	FW	Fiona O'Sullivan	17 September 1986 (aged 25)			(France) ASJ Soyaux
	FW	Ruesha Littlejohn	3 July 1990 (aged 21)	0	0	(England) Liverpool
	FW	Denise O'Sullivan	4 February 1994 (aged 18)	3	3	(Republic of Ireland) Cork Women
	FW	Shannon Smyth	22 June 1987 (aged 24)			(Norway) Amazon Grimstad
	FW	Emma Mullin	4 March 1985 (aged 26)	0	0	(Republic of Ireland) Castlebar Celtic
	FW	Michele O'Brien	28 June 1980 (aged 31)			Unattached
	DF	Diane Caldwell	11 September 1988 (aged 23)			(Norway) Avaldsnes IL
	FW	Sara Lawlor	11 November 1987 (aged 24)	0	0	(Republic of Ireland) Peamount United

=== Wales ===
Coach: (Finland) Jarmo Matikainen

No.	Pos.	Player	Date of birth (age)	Caps	Goals	Club
	GK	Nicola Davies	28 December 1985 (aged 26)			(England) Rochdale
	GK	Rhian Noakes	13 February 1989 (aged 23)			(Wales) Cardiff City
	DF	Kylie Davies	25 September 1987 (aged 24)			(England) Chelsea
	DF	Kayleigh Green	22 March 1988 (aged 23)			(Wales) Cardiff City
	DF	Sophie Ingle	2 September 1991 (aged 20)			(England) Chelsea
	DF	Nia Jones	6 April 1992 (aged 19)			(Wales) Cardiff City
	DF	Hayley Ladd	6 October 1993 (aged 18)			(England) Arsenal
	MF	Helen Bleazard	14 August 1990 (aged 21)			(England) Chelsea
	MF	Katie Daley	5 January 1986 (aged 26)			(England) Chelsea
	MF	Loren Dykes	5 February 1988 (aged 24)			(England) Bristol Academy
	MF	Jessica Fishlock	14 January 1987 (aged 25)			(England) Bristol Academy
	MF	Michelle Green	18 December 1982 (aged 29)			(England) Bristol Academy
	MF	Angharad James	1 June 1994 (aged 17)			(England) Arsenal
	MF	Jayne Ludlow	7 January 1979 (aged 33)			(England) Arsenal
	FW	Natasha Harding	2 March 1989 (aged 22)			(England) Bristol Academy
	FW	Gwennan Harries	5 January 1988 (aged 24)			(England) Everton
	FW	Hannah Keryakoplis	1 February 1994 (aged 18)			(England) Liverpool
	FW	Helen Lander	26 April 1986 (aged 25)			(England) Chelsea
	FW	Amie Lea	20 April 1990 (aged 21)			(Wales) Cardiff City
	FW	Sarah Wiltshire	7 July 1991 (aged 20)			(England) Watford
