= Moldovan women's football clubs in European competitions =

Moldovan clubs have participated since 2001, when Codru entered the 2001–02 UEFA Women's Cup.

== UEFA Women's Cup/UEFA Women's Champions League ==
=== Matches ===
Season	Club	Round	Opponent	Home	Away	Agg.
UEFA Women's Cup
2001–02	Codru Chișinău	Qualifying round	(Slovenia) Ilirija Ljubljana	9–0	9–0	18–0
2001–02	Codru Chișinău	Group 4 (Germany) (host)	(Armenia) College Yerevan	9–0		3rd
2001–02	Codru Chișinău	Group 4 (Germany) (host)	(Germany) Frankfurt	0–5		3rd
2001–02	Codru Chișinău	Group 4 (Germany) (host)	(Spain) Levante	1–3		3rd
2002–03	Codru Anenii Noi	Group 6 (Belarus) (host)	(Denmark) Fortuna Hjørring	0–5		4th
2002–03	Codru Anenii Noi	Group 6 (Belarus) (host)	(Belarus) Bobruichanka	0–6		4th
2002–03	Codru Anenii Noi	Group 6 (Belarus) (host)	(Iceland) Breiðablik	0–2		4th
2003–04	Codru Anenii Noi	Group 8 (Netherlands) (host)	(Netherlands) Ter Leede	0–8		3rd
2003–04	Codru Anenii Noi	Group 8 (Netherlands) (host)	(England) Fulham London	1–9		3rd
2003–04	Codru Anenii Noi	Group 8 (Netherlands) (host)	(Faroe Islands) KÍ Klaksvík	5–3		3rd
2004–05	Codru Anenii Noi	First qualifying round Group A3 (Belarus) (host)	(Belarus) Bobruichanka	0–2		2nd
2004–05	Codru Anenii Noi	First qualifying round Group A3 (Belarus) (host)	(Hungary) Viktória Szombathely	1–1		2nd
2004–05	Codru Anenii Noi	First qualifying round Group A3 (Belarus) (host)	(Estonia) Pärnu	5–1		2nd
2005–06	Codru Anenii Noi	First qualifying round Group A5 (North Macedonia) (host)	(North Macedonia) Skiponjat	4–1		2nd
2005–06	Codru Anenii Noi	First qualifying round Group A5 (North Macedonia) (host)	(Faroe Islands) KÍ Klaksvík	4–1		2nd
2005–06	Codru Anenii Noi	First qualifying round Group A5 (North Macedonia) (host)	(Switzerland) LUwin.ch	0–4		2nd
2006–07	Narta Chișinău	First qualifying round Group A9 (Bulgaria) (host)	(Bulgaria) NSA Sofia	1–3		3rd
2006–07	Narta Chișinău	First qualifying round Group A9 (Bulgaria) (host)	(Azerbaijan) Gömrükçü Baku	2–1		3rd
2006–07	Narta Chișinău	First qualifying round Group A9 (Bulgaria) (host)	(Hungary) Femina Budapest	0–7		3rd
2007–08	Narta Chișinău	First qualifying round Group A9 (Moldova) (host)	(Kazakhstan) Alma	0–5		3rd
2007–08	Narta Chișinău	First qualifying round Group A9 (Moldova) (host)	(Hungary) Femina Budapest	0–2		3rd
2007–08	Narta Chișinău	First qualifying round Group A9 (Moldova) (host)	(Azerbaijan) Ruslan-93	3–1		3rd
2008–09	Narta Chișinău	First qualifying round Group A2 (Serbia) (host)	(Serbia) Mašinac Niš	1–15		4th
2008–09	Narta Chișinău	First qualifying round Group A2 (Serbia) (host)	(Netherlands) AZ Alkmaar	0–7		4th
2008–09	Narta Chișinău	First qualifying round Group A2 (Serbia) (host)	(Scotland) Glasgow City	0–11		4th
UEFA Women's Champions League
2009–10	Roma Calfa	Qualifying round Group 5 (Sweden) (host)	(Sweden) Linköping	0–11		4th
2009–10	Roma Calfa	Qualifying round Group 5 (Sweden) (host)	(Romania) Clujana	0–9		4th
2009–10	Roma Calfa	Qualifying round Group 5 (Sweden) (host)	(Northern Ireland) Glentoran Belfast	0–2		4th
2010–11	Roma Calfa	Qualifying round Group 1 (Denmark) (host)	(Denmark) Brøndby	0–6		3rd
2010–11	Roma Calfa	Qualifying round Group 1 (Denmark) (host)	(Bulgaria) NSA Sofia	0–4		3rd
2010–11	Roma Calfa	Qualifying round Group 1 (Denmark) (host)	(Turkey) Gazi Üniversitesi	3–3		3rd
2011–12	Goliador Chișinău	Qualifying round Group 1 (North Macedonia) (host)	(Greece) PAOK	0–3		4th
2011–12	Goliador Chișinău	Qualifying round Group 1 (North Macedonia) (host)	(Switzerland) Young Boys	0–7		4th
2011–12	Goliador Chișinău	Qualifying round Group 1 (North Macedonia) (host)	(North Macedonia) Naše Taksi	0–6		4th
2012–13	Noroc Nimoreni	Qualifying round Group 8 (Finland) (host)	(Finland) PK-35 Vantaa	0–6		4th
2012–13	Noroc Nimoreni	Qualifying round Group 8 (Finland) (host)	(Scotland) Glasgow City	0–11		4th
2012–13	Noroc Nimoreni	Qualifying round Group 8 (Finland) (host)	(Croatia) Osijek	1–11		4th
2013–14	Goliador Chișinău	Qualifying round Group 7 (Cyprus) (host)	(Israel) ASA Tel Aviv	0–6		4th
2013–14	Goliador Chișinău	Qualifying round Group 7 (Cyprus) (host)	(Cyprus) Apollon Limassol	0–1		4th
2013–14	Goliador Chișinău	Qualifying round Group 7 (Cyprus) (host)	(Slovakia) Union Nové Zámky	0–6		4th
2014–15	Goliador-Real Chișinău	Qualifying round Group 5 (Croatia) (host)	(Croatia) Osijek	0–12		4th
2014–15	Goliador-Real Chișinău	Qualifying round Group 5 (Croatia) (host)	(Serbia) Spartak Subotica	0–19		4th
2014–15	Goliador-Real Chișinău	Qualifying round Group 5 (Croatia) (host)	(Greece) Amazones Dramas	0–11		4th
2015–16	Noroc Nimoreni	Qualifying round Group 6 (Croatia) (host)	(Croatia) Osijek	0–4		4th
2015–16	Noroc Nimoreni	Qualifying round Group 6 (Croatia) (host)	(Serbia) Spartak Subotica	1–4		4th
2015–16	Noroc Nimoreni	Qualifying round Group 6 (Croatia) (host)	(Portugal) Benfica	0–3		4th
2016–17	ARF Criuleni	Qualifying round Group 7 (Republic of Ireland) (host)	(Lithuania) Gintra	0–13		4th
2016–17	ARF Criuleni	Qualifying round Group 7 (Republic of Ireland) (host)	(Kazakhstan) BIIK Kazygurt	0–3		4th
2016–17	ARF Criuleni	Qualifying round Group 7 (Republic of Ireland) (host)	(Republic of Ireland) Wexford	0–0		4th
2017–18	Noroc Nimoreni	Qualifying round Group 5 (Cyprus) (host)	(Austria) Sturm Graz	0–4		4th
2017–18	Noroc Nimoreni	Qualifying round Group 5 (Cyprus) (host)	(Cyprus) Apollon Limassol	0–6		4th
2017–18	Noroc Nimoreni	Qualifying round Group 5 (Cyprus) (host)	(Bulgaria) NSA Sofia	0–1		4th
2018–19	Agarista Anenii Noi	Qualifying round Group 8 (Bosnia and Herzegovina) (host)	(Estonia) Pärnu	0–2		4th
2018–19	Agarista Anenii Noi	Qualifying round Group 8 (Bosnia and Herzegovina) (host)	(Bosnia and Herzegovina) Sarajevo	0–5		4th
2018–19	Agarista Anenii Noi	Qualifying round Group 8 (Bosnia and Herzegovina) (host)	(Albania) Vllaznia Shkodër	1–4		4th
2019–20	Agarista Anenii Noi	Qualifying round Group 5 (Slovakia) (host)	(Serbia) Spartak Subotica	0–12		4th
2019–20	Agarista Anenii Noi	Qualifying round Group 5 (Slovakia) (host)	(Hungary) Ferencváros	0–2		4th
2019–20	Agarista Anenii Noi	Qualifying round Group 5 (Slovakia) (host)	(Slovakia) Slovan Bratislava	0–1		4th
2020–21	Agarista Anenii Noi	First qualifying round	(Serbia) Spartak Subotica	—N/a	0–4	—N/a
2021–22	Agarista Anenii Noi	Round 1 (Greece) (host)	(Greece) PAOK	0–6		4th
2021–22	Agarista Anenii Noi	Round 1 (Greece) (host)	(Kosovo) Mitrovica	0–3		4th
2022–23	Agarista Anenii Noi	Round 1 (Netherlands) (host)	(Netherlands) Twente	0–13		4th
2022–23	Agarista Anenii Noi	Round 1 (Netherlands) (host)	(Kosovo) EP-Hajvalia	0–7		4th
2023–24	Agarista Anenii Noi	Round 1 (Moldova) (host)	(Belarus) Dinamo Minsk	0–9		3rd
2024–25	Agarista Anenii Noi	Round 1 (Lithuania) (host)	(Lithuania) Gintra	0–5		4th
2024–25	Agarista Anenii Noi	Round 1 (Lithuania) (host)	(Finland) KuPS	0–6		4th
2025–26	Agarista Anenii Noi	First qualifying round (Slovakia) (host)	(Malta) Swieqi United	0–5		4th
2025–26	Agarista Anenii Noi	First qualifying round (Slovakia) (host)	(Montenegro) Budućnost Podgorica	0–3		4th
2026–27	Zimbru Chișinău	First qualifying round (Kosovo) (host)	(Kosovo) Mitrovica	0–10		4th
2026–27	Zimbru Chișinău	First qualifying round (Kosovo) (host)	(Faroe Islands) KÍ Klaksvík	1–4		4th
2027–28		First qualifying round (host)				

== Overall record ==
As of 25 July 2026

=== By competition ===
Competition	P	W	D	L	GF	GA	GD	Win %
Champions League / Women's Cup	71	9	3	59	62	376	−314	12.68

=== By country ===
Opponents	Pld	W	D	L	GF	GA	GD
Albania	1	0	0	1	1	4	−3
Armenia	1	1	0	0	9	0	+9
Austria	1	0	0	1	0	4	−4
Azerbaijan	2	2	0	0	5	2	+3
Belarus	3	0	0	3	0	17	−17
Bosnia and Herzegovina	1	0	0	1	0	5	−5
Bulgaria	3	0	0	3	1	8	−7
Croatia	3	0	0	3	1	27	−26
Cyprus	2	0	0	2	0	7	−7
Denmark	2	0	0	2	0	11	−11
England	1	0	0	1	1	9	−8
Estonia	2	1	0	1	5	3	+2
Faroe Islands	3	2	0	1	10	8	+2
Finland	2	0	0	2	0	12	−12
Germany	1	0	0	1	0	5	−5
Greece	3	0	0	3	0	20	−20
Hungary	4	0	1	3	1	12	−11
Iceland	1	0	0	1	0	2	−2
Ireland	1	0	1	0	0	0	0
Israel	1	0	0	1	0	6	−6
Kazakhstan	2	0	0	2	0	8	−8
Kosovo	3	0	0	3	0	20	−20
Lithuania	2	0	0	2	0	18	−18
Macedonia	2	1	0	1	4	7	−3
Malta	1	0	0	1	0	5	−5
Montenegro	1	0	0	1	0	3	−3
Netherlands	3	0	0	3	0	28	−28
Northern Ireland	1	0	0	1	0	2	−2
Portugal	1	0	0	1	0	3	−3
Romania	1	0	0	1	0	9	−9
Scotland	2	0	0	2	0	22	−22
Serbia	5	0	0	5	2	54	−52
Slovakia	2	0	0	2	0	7	−7
Slovenia	2	2	0	0	18	0	+18
Spain	1	0	0	1	1	3	−2
Sweden	1	0	0	1	0	11	−11
Switzerland	2	0	0	2	0	11	−11
Turkey	1	0	1	0	3	3	0

== See also ==
- Moldovan football clubs in European competitions
