= Zsófia Rácz =

Hungarian footballer (born 1988)

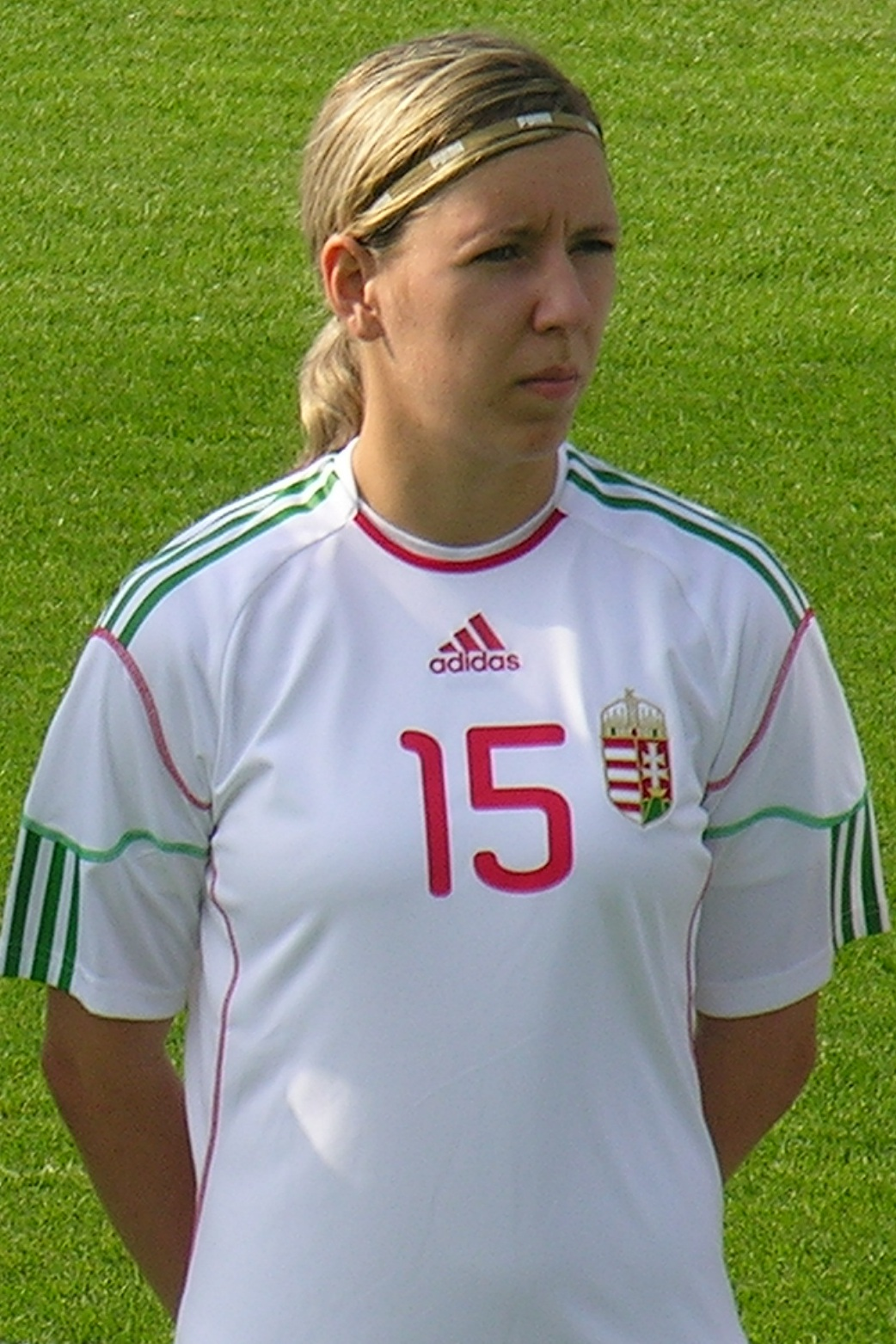
- Rácz with Hungary in 2012

Personal information
- Date of birth: 28 December 1988 (age 37)
- Place of birth: Győr, Hungary
- Height: 1.70 m (5 ft 7 in)
- Position: Midfielder

Team information
- Current team: RB Leipzig (assistant)

Senior career*
Years	Team	Apps	(Gls)
–2006	Fészek		
2006–2012	Viktória FC-Szombathely		
2012–2015	1. FC Lübars	62	(16)
2016–2017	MSV Duisburg	32	(4)
2017–2019	PSV Eindhoven		
2019–2020	Viktória FC-Szombathely		

International career
2007–?	Hungary		
- * Club domestic league appearances and goals

Zsófia Rácz (born 28 December 1988) is a Hungarian former professional footballer who played as a midfielder. She is currently an assistant coach of Frauen-Bundesliga club RB Leipzig.

She first played the Champions League in 2010. She was a member of the Hungary national team from 2007.
