= Boglárka Megyeri =

Hungarian footballer

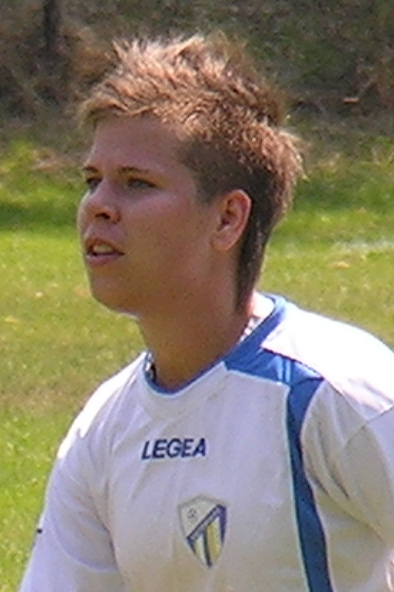

Personal information
- Full name: Boglárka Megyeri
- Date of birth: 19 July 1987 (age 39)
- Place of birth: Budapest, Hungary
- Position: Midfielder

Senior career*
Years	Team	Apps	(Gls)
2004–	Viktória FC-Szombathely		

International career^{‡}
2007–	Hungary	15	(1)
- * Club domestic league appearances and goals ‡ National team caps and goals as of 24 August 2012

Boglárka Megyeri (born 19 July 1987 in Budapest) is a Hungarian football midfielder currently playing in the Hungarian First Division for Viktória FC-Szombathely. She is a member of the Hungarian national team.
