= Szabina Tálosi =

Hungarian footballer

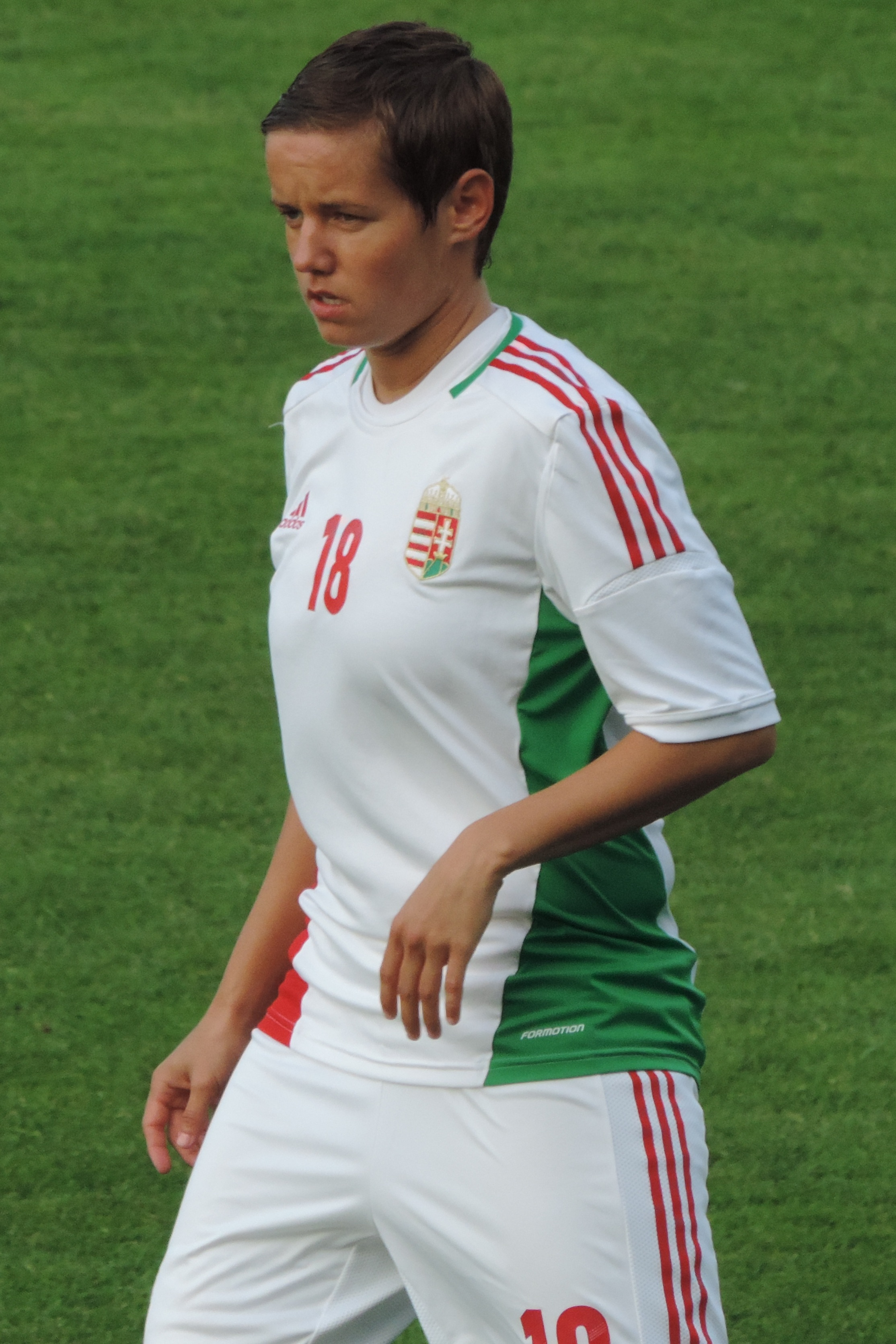

Personal information
- Full name: Szabina Tálosi
- Date of birth: 20 January 1989 (age 37)
- Place of birth: Nagykanizsa, Hungary
- Position: Defender

Senior career*
Years	Team	Apps	(Gls)
2004–2012	Viktória FC-Szombathely		
2013–	FC Südburgenland		

International career^{‡}
2007–	Hungary	94	(4)
- * Club domestic league appearances and goals ‡ National team caps and goals as of 8 November 2018

Szabina Tálosi (born 20 January 1989 in Nagykanizsa) is a Hungarian football defender currently playing in the Hungarian First Division for Viktória FC, with whom she has also played the Champions League. She is a member of the Hungarian national team.
