= Çağla Korkmaz =

Turkish-German footballer

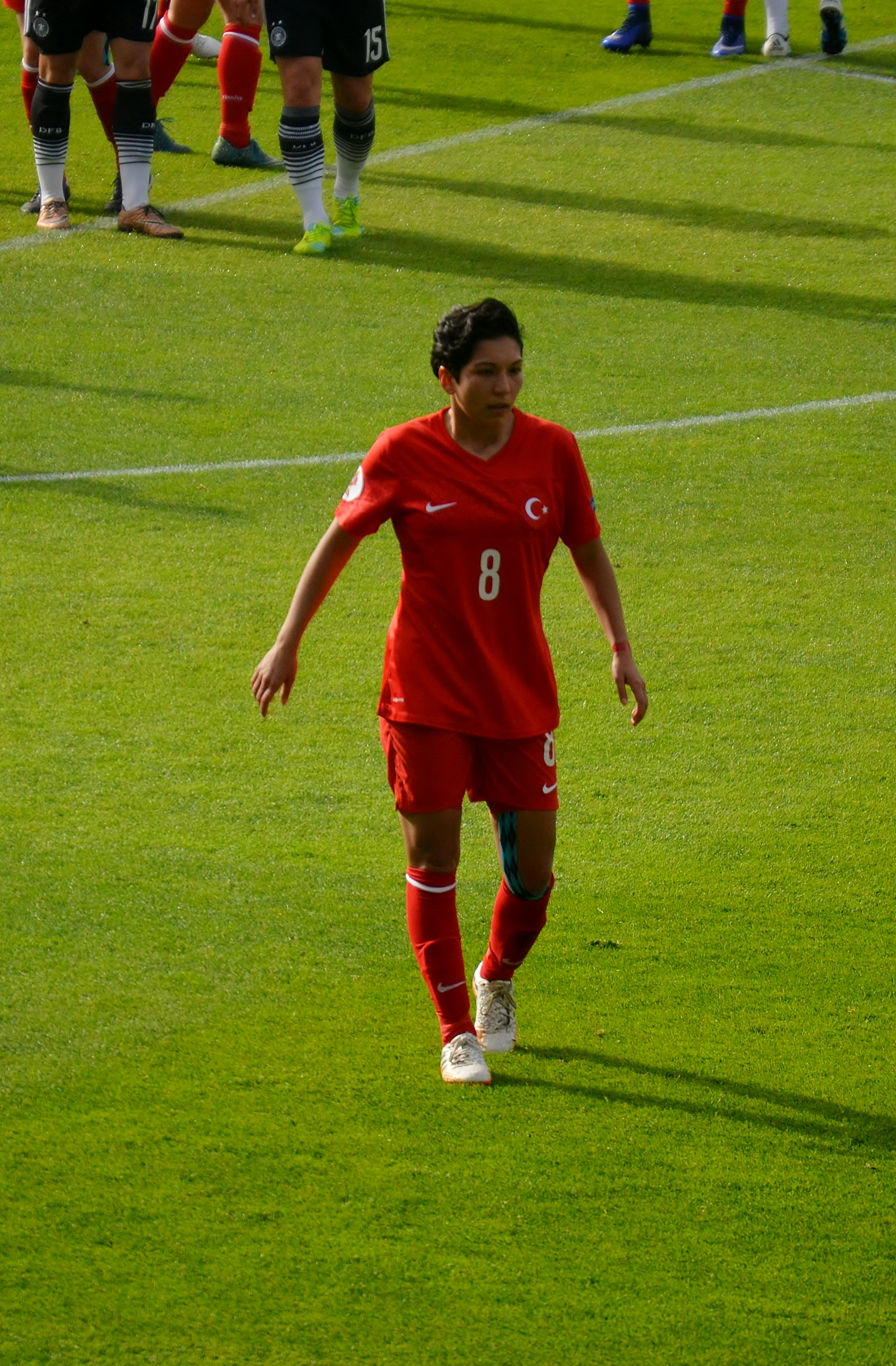
- Korkmaz for Turkey in 2016

Personal information
- Date of birth: 14 November 1990 (age 35)
- Place of birth: Munich, Germany
- Position: Forward

Youth career
- FFC Wacker München

Senior career*
Years	Team	Apps	(Gls)
2007–	FFC Wacker München	0	(0)
2011–2012	FC Stern München 1919	3	(0)
2012–2014	FC Ingolstadt 04	29	(11)
2014–2016	1. FC Lübars	45	(4)
2016–2017	VfL Wolfsburg II	20	(1)
2017–2018	TSV Schott Mainz	21	(4)
2018–2020	SV Meppen	6	(1)
2020–2023	FFC Wacker München	17	(2)

International career
2015–2018	Turkey	21	(1)

Managerial career
- 2025–2026: Galatasaray (assistant coach)
- * Club domestic league appearances and goals

Çağla Korkmaz (born 14 November 1990) is a former footballer who played as a forward. Born in Germany, she made 21 appearances for the Turkey national team, scoring one goal.

== Early life ==
Çağla Korkmaz was born to Turkish immigrant parents in Munich, Germany on 14 November 1990.

== Career ==
Korkmaz played for FC Stern München 1919 in the 2011–12 season bevor sie moved to FC Ingolstadt 04, where she scored eleven goals in 29 games of two seasons. Currently, she is part of 1. FC Lübars in the German 2. Bundesliga.

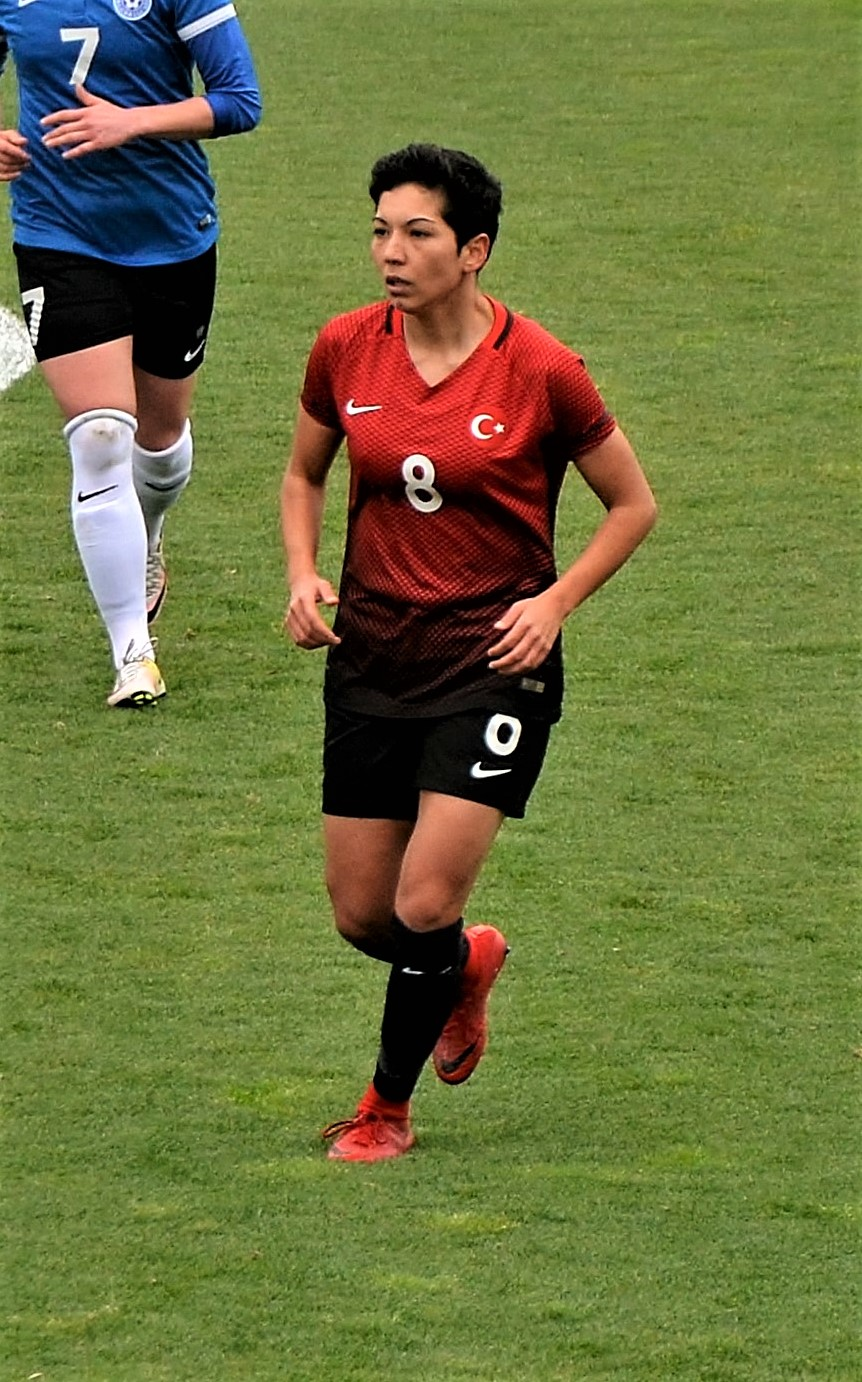
Çağla Korkmaz playing for Turkey national in the friendly match against Estonia at TFF Riva Facility on 7 April 2018.

She was admitted to the Turkey women's team debuting in the friendly match against Georgia on 24 February 2015.
