= Klaudia Kovács =

Hungarian footballer (born 1990)

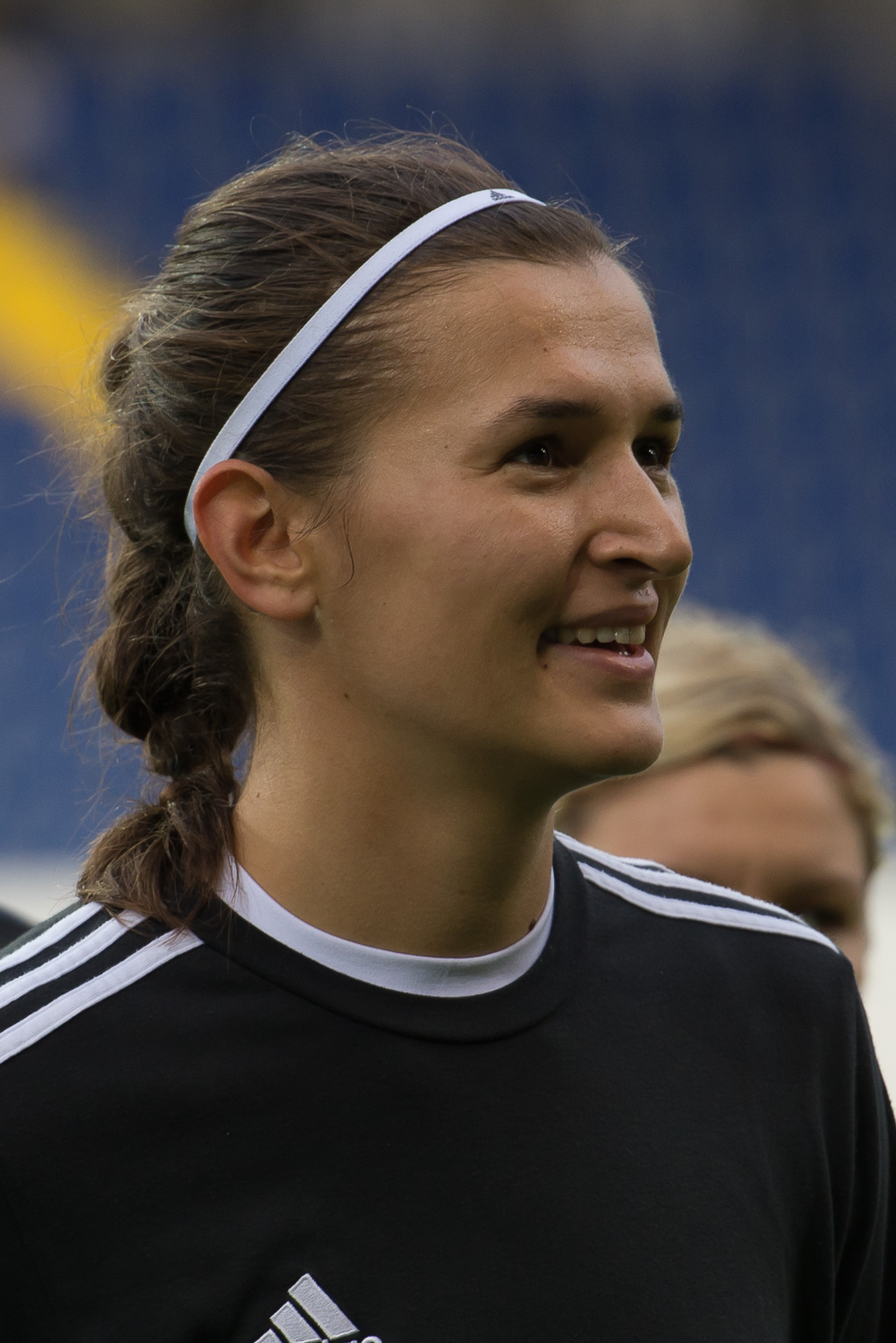

Personal information
- Full name: Klaudia Kovács
- Date of birth: 17 November 1990 (age 35)
- Place of birth: Kiskunfélegyháza, Hungary
- Position: Goalkeeper

Team information
- Current team: Astra Hungary FC

Youth career
- 2005–2007: Kiskunfélegyházi HTK
- 2007–2009: Kecskeméti NLSE

Senior career*
Years	Team	Apps	(Gls)
2009–2011	Taksony SE		
2011–	Astra Hungary FC		

International career^{‡}
2009–2014	Hungary	7	(0)
- * Club domestic league appearances and goals ‡ National team caps and goals as of 5 August 2014

Klaudia Kovács (born 17 November 1990) is a Hungarian football goalkeeper currently playing in the Hungarian First Division for Astra Hungary FC. She is a member of the Hungarian national team.
