= Moldovan football clubs in European competitions =

Moldovan football clubs have participated in European football competitions since 1993.

== UEFA 5-year club ranking ==
As of 5 November 2026.

| Rank | Club | Points gained in season | | | | | Total |
| Rank | Club | 2022–23 | 2023–24 | 2024–25 | 2025–26 | 2026–27 | Total |
|---|---|---|---|---|---|---|---|
| 143 | Sheriff Tiraspol | 4.000 | 3.000 | 2.000 | 2.000 | 2.000 | 13.000 |
| 196 | Petrocub Hîncești | 2.000 | 1.500 | 2.500 | 1.500 | 1.500 | 9.000 |
| 227 | Milsami Orhei | 1.500 | 1.000 | 1.500 | 2.000 | 1.000 | 7.000 |
| 244 | Zimbru Chișinău | | 1.500 | 1.500 | 1.500 | 1.500 | 6.000 |
| 378 | Sfîntul Gheorghe Suruceni | 1.000 | | | | | 2.050 |

Clubs can still drop down in the ranking, as the 2026–27 club season is currently underway.

== All-time contribution of points for the UEFA country ranking ==
At the end of 2026–27 season.

| Club | Points |
|---|---|
| Sheriff Tiraspol | 26.124 |
| Zimbru Chișinău | 13.166 |
| Milsami Orhei | 4.000 |
| Petrocub Hîncești | 3.250 |
| Dacia Chișinău | 3.000 |

| Club | Points |
|---|---|
| Nistru Otaci | 2.166 |
| Constructorul Chișinău | 1.333 |
| Tiraspol | 0.916 |
| Tiligul Tiraspol | 0.833 |
| Zaria Bălți | 0.625 |

| Club | Points |
|---|---|
| Sfîntul Gheorghe Suruceni | 0.375 |
| Olimpia Bălți | 0.250 |
| Iskra-Stal Rîbnița | 0.125 |
| Veris Chișinău | 0.125 |
| Dinamo-Auto Tiraspol | 0.125 |

== UEFA country coefficient and ranking ==
For the 2027–28 UEFA competitions, the associations were allocated places according to their 2026 UEFA country coefficients, which take into account their performance in European competitions from 2021–22 to 2025–26. In the 2026 rankings that are used for the 2027–28 European competitions, Moldova's coefficient points total is 14.625. Moldova is ranked by UEFA as the 34th association in Europe out of 55.

- 32 Iceland 16.520
- 33 Armenia 15.062
- 34 Moldova 14.625
- 35 Finland 14.000
- 36 Kosovo 13.989
  - Full list

== UEFA country coefficient history ==
At the end of 2026–27 season.

| Accumulated | Valid | Rank | Movement | Coefficient | Change |
|---|---|---|---|---|---|
| 1993–1994 | 1995–96 | 42 | Steady | 1.000 | Steady |
| 1993–94 to 1994–95 | 1996–97 | 45 | ▼ –3 | 1.000 | Steady |
| 1993–94 to 1995–96 | 1997–98 | 36 | ▲ +9 | 5.000 | ▲ +4.000 |
| 1993–94 to 1996–97 | 1998–99 | 36 | Steady | 6.000 | ▲ +1.000 |
| 1993–94 to 1997–98 | 1999–00 | 37 | ▼ –1 | 6.666 | ▲ +0.666 |
| 1994–95 to 1998–99 | 2000–01 | 37 | Steady | 4.333 | ▼ –2.333 |
| 1995–96 to 1999–00 | 2001–02 | 34 | ▲ +3 | 6.333 | ▲ +2.000 |
| 1996–97 to 2000–01 | 2002–03 | 35 | ▼ –1 | 4.499 | ▼ –1.834 |
| 1997–98 to 2001–02 | 2003–04 | 33 | ▲ +2 | 5.165 | ▲ +0.666 |
| 1998–99 to 2002–03 | 2004–05 | 32 | ▲ +1 | 5.832 | ▲ +0.667 |
| 1999–00 to 2003–04 | 2005–06 | 30 | ▲ +2 | 6.832 | ▲ +1.000 |
| 2000–01 to 2004–05 | 2006–07 | 33 | ▼ –3 | 6.332 | ▼ –0.500 |
| 2001–02 to 2005–06 | 2007–08 | 33 | Steady | 6.832 | ▲ +0.500 |
| 2002–03 to 2006–07 | 2008–09 | 34 | ▼ –1 | 7.166 | ▲ +0.334 |
| 2003–04 to 2007–08 | 2009–10 | 34 | Steady | 7.499 | ▲ +0.333 |
| 2004–05 to 2008–09 | 2010–11 | 37 | ▼ –3 | 6.665 | ▼ –0.834 |
| 2005–06 to 2009–10 | 2011–12 | 34 | ▲ +3 | 7.290 | ▲ +0.625 |
| 2006–07 to 2010–11 | 2012–13 | 33 | ▲ +1 | 7.749 | ▲ +0.459 |
| 2007–08 to 2011–12 | 2013–14 | 36 | ▼ –3 | 6.749 | ▼ –1.000 |
| 2008–09 to 2012–13 | 2014–15 | 35 | ▲ +1 | 7.666 | ▲ +0.917 |
| 2009–10 to 2013–14 | 2015–16 | 31 | ▲ +4 | 10.375 | ▲ +2.709 |
| 2010–11 to 2014–15 | 2016–17 | 33 | ▼ –2 | 10.000 | ▼ –0.375 |
| 2011–12 to 2015–16 | 2017–18 | 34 | ▼ –1 | 9.125 | ▼ –0.875 |
| 2012–13 to 2016–17 | 2018–19 | 34 | Steady | 9.500 | ▲ +0.375 |
| 2013–14 to 2017–18 | 2019–20 | 33 | ▲ +1 | 10.000 | ▲ +0.500 |
| 2014–15 to 2018–19 | 2020–21 | 35 | ▼ –2 | 7.750 | ▼ –2.250 |
| 2015–16 to 2019–20 | 2021–22 | 41 | ▼ –6 | 6.750 | ▼ –1.000 |
| 2016–17 to 2020–21 | 2022–23 | 45 | ▼ –4 | 6.875 | ▲ +0.125 |
| 2017–18 to 2021–22 | 2023–24 | 33 | ▲ +12 | 11.250 | ▲ +4.375 |
| 2018–19 to 2022–23 | 2024–25 | 32 | ▲ +1 | 12.250 | ▲ +1.000 |
| 2019–20 to 2023–24 | 2025–26 | 31 | ▲ +1 | 13.125 | ▲ +0.875 |
| 2020–21 to 2024–25 | 2026–27 | 32 | ▼ –1 | 14.500 | ▲ +1.375 |
| 2021–22 to 2025–26 | 2027–28 | 34 | ▼ –2 | 14.625 | ▲ +0.125 |
| 2022–23 to 2026–27 | 2028–29 | 40–45 | ▼ | 10.250 | ▼ –4.375 |

== Active competitions ==
=== UEFA Champions League ===
| Season | Club | Round | Opponent | Home | Away | Agg. | |
|---|---|---|---|---|---|---|---|
| 1993–94 | Zimbru Chișinău | Preliminary round | (Israel) Beitar Jerusalem | 1–1 | 0–2 | 1–3 | |
| 1997–98 | Constructorul Chișinău | First qualifying round | (Belarus) MPKC Mozyr | 1–1 | 2–3 | 3–4 | |
| 1998–99 | Zimbru Chișinău | First qualifying round | (Hungary) Újpest | 1–0 | 1–3 | 2–3 | |
| 1999–00 | Zimbru Chișinău | First qualifying round | (Republic of Ireland) St Patrick's Athletic | 5–0 | 5–0 | 10–0 | |
| 1999–00 | Zimbru Chișinău | Second qualifying round | (Georgia (country)) Dinamo Tbilisi | 2–0 | 1–2 | 3–2 | |
| 1999–00 | Zimbru Chișinău | Third qualifying round | (Netherlands) PSV Eindhoven | 0–0 | 0–2 | 0–2 | UC |
| 2000–01 | Zimbru Chișinău | First qualifying round | (Albania) Tirana | 3–2 | 3–2 | 6–4 | |
| 2000–01 | Zimbru Chișinău | Second qualifying round | (Slovenia) Maribor | 2–0 | 0–1 | 2–1 | |
| 2000–01 | Zimbru Chișinău | Third qualifying round | (Czech Republic) Sparta Prague | 0–1 | 0–1 | 0–2 | UC |
| 2001–02 | Sheriff Tiraspol | First qualifying round | (Armenia) Araks | 2–0 | 1–0 | 3–0 | |
| 2001–02 | Sheriff Tiraspol | Second qualifying round | (Belgium) Anderlecht | 1–2 | 0–4 | 1–6 | |
| 2002–03 | Sheriff Tiraspol | First qualifying round | (Kazakhstan) Zhenis | 2–1 | 2–3 | 4–4 (a) | |
| 2002–03 | Sheriff Tiraspol | Second qualifying round | (Austria) Grazer AK | 1–4 | 0–2 | 1–6 | |
| 2003–04 | Sheriff Tiraspol | First qualifying round | (Estonia) Flora Tallinn | 1–0 | 1–1 | 2–1 | |
| 2003–04 | Sheriff Tiraspol | Second qualifying round | (Ukraine) Shakhtar Donetsk | 0–0 | 0–2 | 0–2 | |
| 2004–05 | Sheriff Tiraspol | First qualifying round | (Luxembourg) Jeunesse Esch | 2–0 | 0–1 | 2–1 | |
| 2004–05 | Sheriff Tiraspol | Second qualifying round | (Norway) Rosenborg | 0–2 | 1–2 | 1–4 | |
| 2005–06 | Sheriff Tiraspol | First qualifying round | (Malta) Sliema Wanderers | 2–0 | 4–1 | 6–1 | |
| 2005–06 | Sheriff Tiraspol | Second qualifying round | (Serbia and Montenegro) Partizan | 0–1 | 0–1 | 0–2 | |
| 2006–07 | Sheriff Tiraspol | First qualifying round | (Armenia) Pyunik | 2–0 | 0–0 | 2–0 | |
| 2006–07 | Sheriff Tiraspol | Second qualifying round | (Russia) Spartak Moscow | 1–1 | 0–0 | 1–1 (a) | |
| 2007–08 | Sheriff Tiraspol | First qualifying round | (Andorra) Rànger's | 2–0 | 3–0 | 5–0 | |
| 2007–08 | Sheriff Tiraspol | Second qualifying round | (Turkey) Beşiktaş | 0–3 | 0–1 | 0–4 | |
| 2008–09 | Sheriff Tiraspol | First qualifying round | (Kazakhstan) Aktobe | 4–0 | 0–1 | 4–1 | |
| 2008–09 | Sheriff Tiraspol | Second qualifying round | (Czech Republic) Sparta Prague | 0–1 | 0–2 | 0–3 | |
| 2009–10 | Sheriff Tiraspol | Second qualifying round | (Finland) Inter Turku | 1–0 | 1–0 | 2–0 | |
| 2009–10 | Sheriff Tiraspol | Third qualifying round | (Czech Republic) Slavia Prague | 0–0 | 1–1 | 1–1 (a) | |
| 2009–10 | Sheriff Tiraspol | Play-off round | (Greece) Olympiacos | 0–2 | 0–1 | 0–3 | EL |
| 2010–11 | Sheriff Tiraspol | Second qualifying round | (Albania) Dinamo Tirana | 3–1 | 0–1 | 3–2 | |
| 2010–11 | Sheriff Tiraspol | Third qualifying round | (Croatia) Dinamo Zagreb | 1–1 | 1–1 (a.e.t) | 2–2 (6–5 p) | |
| 2010–11 | Sheriff Tiraspol | Play-off round | (Switzerland) Basel | 0–3 | 0–1 | 0–4 | EL |
| 2011–12 | Dacia Chișinău | Second qualifying round | (Georgia (country)) Zestaponi | 2–0 | 0–3 | 2–3 | |
| 2012–13 | Sheriff Tiraspol | Second qualifying round | (Armenia) Ulisses | 1–0 | 1–0 | 2–0 | |
| 2012–13 | Sheriff Tiraspol | Third qualifying round | (Croatia) Dinamo Zagreb | 0–1 | 0–4 | 0–5 | EL |
| 2013–14 | Sheriff Tiraspol | Second qualifying round | (Montenegro) Sutjeska Nikšić | 1–1 | 5–0 | 6–1 | |
| 2013–14 | Sheriff Tiraspol | Third qualifying round | (Croatia) Dinamo Zagreb | 0–3 | 0–1 | 0–4 | EL |
| 2014–15 | Sheriff Tiraspol | Second qualifying round | (Montenegro) Sutjeska Nikšić | 2–0 | 3–0 | 5–0 | |
| 2014–15 | Sheriff Tiraspol | Third qualifying round | (Slovakia) Slovan Bratislava | 0–0 | 1–2 | 1–2 | EL |
| 2015–16 | Milsami Orhei | Second qualifying round | (Bulgaria) Ludogorets Razgrad | 2–1 | 1–0 | 3–1 | |
| 2015–16 | Milsami Orhei | Third qualifying round | (Albania) Skënderbeu Korçë | 0–2 | 0–2 | 0–4 | EL |
| 2016–17 | Sheriff Tiraspol | Second qualifying round | (Israel) Hapoel Be'er Sheva | 0–0 | 2–3 | 2–3 | |
| 2017–18 | Sheriff Tiraspol | Second qualifying round | (Albania) Kukësi | 1–0 | 1–2 | 2–2 (a) | |
| 2017–18 | Sheriff Tiraspol | Third qualifying round | (Azerbaijan) Qarabağ | 1–2 | 0–0 | 1–2 | EL |
| 2018–19 | Sheriff Tiraspol | First qualifying round | (Georgia (country)) Torpedo Kutaisi | 3–0 | 1–2 | 4–2 | |
| 2018–19 | Sheriff Tiraspol | Second qualifying round | (North Macedonia) Shkëndija | 0–0 | 0–1 | 0–1 | EL |
| 2019–20 | Sheriff Tiraspol | First qualifying round | (Georgia (country)) Saburtalo Tbilisi | 0–3 | 3–1 | 3–4 | EL |
| 2020–21 | Sheriff Tiraspol | First qualifying round | (Luxembourg) Fola Esch | 2–0 | — | — | |
| 2020–21 | Sheriff Tiraspol | Second qualifying round | (Azerbaijan) Qarabağ | — | 1–2 | — | EL |
| 2021–22 | Sheriff Tiraspol | First qualifying round | (Albania) Teuta | 1–0 | 4–0 | 5–0 | |
| 2021–22 | Sheriff Tiraspol | Second qualifying round | (Armenia) Alashkert | 3–1 | 1–0 | 4–1 | |
| 2021–22 | Sheriff Tiraspol | Third qualifying round | (Serbia) Crvena zvezda | 1–0 | 1–1 | 2–1 | |
| 2021–22 | Sheriff Tiraspol | Play-off round | (Croatia) Dinamo Zagreb | 3–0 | 0–0 | 3–0 | |
| 2021–22 | Sheriff Tiraspol | Group D | (Italy) Inter | 1–3 | 1–3 | 3rd | EL |
| 2021–22 | Sheriff Tiraspol | Group D | (Spain) Real Madrid | 0–3 | 2–1 | 3rd | EL |
| 2021–22 | Sheriff Tiraspol | Group D | (Ukraine) Shakhtar Donetsk | 2–0 | 1–1 | 3rd | EL |
| 2022–23 | Sheriff Tiraspol | First qualifying round | (Bosnia and Herzegovina) Zrinjski Mostar | 1–0 | 0–0 | 1–0 | |
| 2022–23 | Sheriff Tiraspol | Second qualifying round | (Slovenia) Maribor | 1–0 | 0–0 | 1–0 | |
| 2022–23 | Sheriff Tiraspol | Third qualifying round | (Czech Republic) Viktoria Plzeň | 1–2 | 1–2 | 2–4 | EL |
| 2023–24 | Sheriff Tiraspol | First qualifying round | (Romania) Farul Constanța | 3–0 (a.e.t) | 0–1 | 3–1 | |
| 2023–24 | Sheriff Tiraspol | Second qualifying round | (Israel) Maccabi Haifa | 1–0 | 1–4 (a.e.t) | 2–4 | EL |
| 2024–25 | Petrocub Hîncești | First qualifying round | (Kazakhstan) Ordabasy | 1–0 | 0–0 | 1–0 | |
| 2024–25 | Petrocub Hîncești | Second qualifying round | (Cyprus) APOEL | 1–1 | 0–1 | 1–2 | EL |
| 2025–26 | Milsami Orhei | First qualifying round | (Finland) KuPS | 0–0 | 0–1 | 0–1 | CO |
| 2026–27 | Petrocub Hîncești | First qualifying round | (Albania) Egnatia | 1–1 | 1–6 | 2–7 | CO |
| 2027–28 | | First qualifying round | | | | | |

=== UEFA Europa League ===
| Season | Club | Round | Opponent | Home | Away | Agg. | |
|---|---|---|---|---|---|---|---|
UEFA Cup
| 1994–95 | Zimbru Chișinău | Preliminary round | (Hungary) Kispest Honvéd | 0–1 | 1–4 | 1–5 | |
| 1995–96 | Zimbru Chișinău | Preliminary round | (Israel) Hapoel Tel Aviv | 2–0 | 0–0 | 2–0 | |
| 1995–96 | Zimbru Chișinău | First round | (Latvia) RAF Jelgava | 1–0 | 2–1 | 3–1 | |
| 1995–96 | Zimbru Chișinău | Second round | (Czech Republic) Sparta Prague | 0–2 | 3–4 | 3–6 | |
| 1996–97 | Zimbru Chișinău | Preliminary round | (Croatia) Hajduk Split | 0–4 | 1–2 | 1–6 | |
| 1996–97 | Tiligul Tiraspol | Preliminary round | (Belarus) Dinamo-93 Minsk | 1–1 | 1–3 | 2–4 | |
| 1997–98 | Tiligul Tiraspol | First qualifying round | (Switzerland) Neuchâtel Xamax | 1–3 | 0–7 | 1–10 | |
| 1998–99 | Tiligul Tiraspol | First qualifying round | (Belgium) Anderlecht | 0–1 | 0–5 | 0–6 | |
| 1999–00 | Sheriff Tiraspol | Qualifying round | (Czech Republic) Sigma Olomouc | 1–1 | 0–0 | 1–1 (a) | |
| 1999–00 | Constructorul Chișinău | Qualifying round | (Hungary) Ferencváros | 1–1 | 1–3 | 2–4 | |
| 1999–00 | Zimbru Chișinău | First round | (England) Tottenham Hotspur | 0–0 | 0–3 | 0–3 | |
| 2000–01 | Constructorul Chișinău | Qualifying round | (Bulgaria) CSKA Sofia | 2–3 | 0–8 | 2–11 | |
| 2000–01 | Sheriff Tiraspol | Qualifying round | (Slovenia) Olimpija Ljubljana | 0–0 | 0–3 | 0–3 | |
| 2000–01 | Zimbru Chișinău | First round | (Germany) Hertha Berlin | 1–2 | 0–2 | 1–4 | |
| 2001–02 | Zimbru Chișinău | Qualifying round | (Turkey) Gaziantepspor | 0–0 | 1–4 | 1–4 | |
| 2001–02 | Nistru Otaci | Qualifying round | (Hungary) Debrecen | 1–0 | 0–3 | 1–3 | |
| 2002–03 | Nistru Otaci | Qualifying round | (Scotland) Aberdeen | 0–0 | 0–1 | 0–1 | |
| 2002–03 | Zimbru Chișinău | Qualifying round | (Sweden) IFK Göteborg | 3–1 | 2–2 | 5–3 | |
| 2002–03 | Zimbru Chișinău | First round | (Spain) Real Betis | 0–2 | 1–2 | 1–4 | |
| 2003–04 | Nistru Otaci | Qualifying round | (Serbia and Montenegro) Crvena zvezda | 2–3 | 0–5 | 2–8 | |
| 2003–04 | Zimbru Chișinău | Qualifying round | (Bulgaria) Litex Lovech | 2–0 | 0–0 | 2–0 | |
| 2003–04 | Zimbru Chișinău | First round | (Greece) Aris | 1–1 | 1–2 | 2–3 | |
| 2004–05 | Nistru Otaci | First qualifying round | (Belarus) Shakhtyor Soligorsk | 1–1 | 2–1 | 3–2 | |
| 2004–05 | Nistru Otaci | Second qualifying round | (Czech Republic) Sigma Olomouc | 1–2 | 0–4 | 1–6 | |
| 2004–05 | Tiraspol | First qualifying round | (Armenia) Shirak | 2–0 | 2–1 | 4–1 | |
| 2004–05 | Tiraspol | Second qualifying round | (Ukraine) Metalurh Donetsk | 1–2 | 0–3 | 1–5 | |
| 2005–06 | Dacia Chișinău | First qualifying round | (Liechtenstein) Vaduz | 1–0 | 0–2 | 1–2 | |
| 2005–06 | Nistru Otaci | First qualifying round | (Azerbaijan) Khazar Lankaran | 3–1 | 2–1 | 5–2 | |
| 2005–06 | Nistru Otaci | Second qualifying round | (Austria) Grazer AK | 0–2 | 0–1 | 0–3 | |
| 2006–07 | Nistru Otaci | First qualifying round | (Belarus) BATE Borisov | 0–1 | 0–2 | 0–3 | |
| 2006–07 | Zimbru Chișinău | First qualifying round | (Azerbaijan) Qarabağ | 1–1 | 2–1 (a.e.t) | 3–2 | |
| 2006–07 | Zimbru Chișinău | Second qualifying round | (Ukraine) Metalurh Zaporizhya | 0–0 | 0–3 | 0–3 | |
| 2007–08 | Zimbru Chișinău | First qualifying round | (Slovakia) Artmedia Petržalka | 2–2 | 1–1 | 3–3 (a) | |
| 2007–08 | Nistru Otaci | First qualifying round | (Hungary) Budapest Honvéd | 1–1 | 1–1 (a.e.t) | 2–2 (4–5 p) | |
| 2008–09 | Dacia Chișinău | First qualifying round | (Serbia) Borac Čačak | 1–1 | 1–3 | 2–4 | |
| 2008–09 | Nistru Otaci | First qualifying round | (Germany) Hertha Berlin | 0–0 | 1–8 | 1–8 | |
UEFA Europa League
| 2009–10 | Zimbru Chișinău | First qualifying round | (Kazakhstan) Okzhetpes | 1–2 | 2–0 | 3–2 | |
| 2009–10 | Zimbru Chișinău | Second qualifying round | (Portugal) Paços de Ferreira | 0–0 | 0–1 | 0–1 | |
| 2009–10 | Iskra-Stal | Second qualifying round | (Bulgaria) Cherno More | 0–3 | 0–1 | 0–4 | |
| 2009–10 | Dacia Chișinău | Second qualifying round | (Slovakia) MŠK Žilina | 0–1 | 0–2 | 0–3 | |
| 2009–10 | Sheriff Tiraspol | Group H | (Romania) Steaua București | 1–1 | 0–0 | 3rd | |
| 2009–10 | Sheriff Tiraspol | Group H | (Turkey) Fenerbahçe | 0–1 | 0–1 | 3rd | |
| 2009–10 | Sheriff Tiraspol | Group H | (Netherlands) Twente | 2–0 | 1–2 | 3rd | |
| 2010–11 | Olimpia Bălți | First qualifying round | (Azerbaijan) Khazar Lankaran | 0–0 | 1–1 | 1–1 (a) | |
| 2010–11 | Olimpia Bălți | Second qualifying round | (Romania) Dinamo București | 0–2 | 1–5 | 1–7 | |
| 2010–11 | Dacia Chișinău | First qualifying round | (Montenegro) Zeta | 0–0 | 1–1 | 1–1 (a) | |
| 2010–11 | Dacia Chișinău | Second qualifying round | (Sweden) Kalmar | 0–2 | 0–0 | 0–2 | |
| 2010–11 | Iskra-Stal | Second qualifying round | (Sweden) Elfsborg | 0–1 | 1–2 | 1–3 | |
| 2010–11 | Sheriff Tiraspol | Group E | (Netherlands) AZ Alkmaar | 1–1 | 1–2 | 4th | |
| 2010–11 | Sheriff Tiraspol | Group E | (Ukraine) Dynamo Kyiv | 2–0 | 0–0 | 4th | |
| 2010–11 | Sheriff Tiraspol | Group E | (Belarus) BATE Borisov | 0–1 | 1–3 | 4th | |
| 2011–12 | Milsami Orhei | First qualifying round | (Georgia (country)) Dinamo Tbilisi | 1–3 | 0–2 | 1–5 | |
| 2011–12 | Iskra-Stal | Second qualifying round | (Croatia) Varaždin | 1–1 | 1–3 | 2–4 | |
| 2011–12 | Sheriff Tiraspol | Second qualifying round | (Bosnia and Herzegovina) Željezničar | 0–0 | 0–1 | 0–1 | |
| 2012–13 | Dacia Chișinău | First qualifying round | (Slovenia) Celje | 1–0 | 1–0 | 2–0 | |
| 2012–13 | Dacia Chișinău | Second qualifying round | (Sweden) Elfsborg | 1–0 | 0–2 | 1–2 | |
| 2012–13 | Zimbru Chișinău | First qualifying round | (Wales) Bangor City | 2–1 | 0–0 | 2–1 | |
| 2012–13 | Zimbru Chișinău | Second qualifying round | (Switzerland) Young Boys | 1–0 (a.e.t) | 0–1 | 1–1 (1–4 p) | |
| 2012–13 | Milsami Orhei | Second qualifying round | (Kazakhstan) Aktobe | 4–2 | 0–3 | 4–5 | |
| 2012–13 | Sheriff Tiraspol | Play-off round | (France) Marseille | 1–2 | 0–0 | 1–2 | |
| 2013–14 | Tiraspol | First qualifying round | (Latvia) Skonto Riga | 0–1 | 1–0 (a.e.t) | 1–1 (2–4 p) | |
| 2013–14 | Dacia Chișinău | First qualifying round | (Albania) Teuta Durrës | 2–0 | 1–3 | 3–3 (a) | |
| 2013–14 | Dacia Chișinău | Second qualifying round | (Ukraine) Chornomorets Odesa | 2–1 | 0–2 | 2–3 | |
| 2013–14 | Milsami Orhei | First qualifying round | (Luxembourg) F91 Dudelange | 1–0 | 0–0 | 1–0 | |
| 2013–14 | Milsami Orhei | Second qualifying round | (Belarus) Shakhtyor Soligorsk | 1–1 (a.e.t) | 1–1 | 2–2 (4–2 p) | |
| 2013–14 | Milsami Orhei | Third qualifying round | (France) Saint-Étienne | 0–3 | 0–3 | 0–6 | |
| 2013–14 | Sheriff Tiraspol | Play-off round | (Serbia) Vojvodina | 2–1 | 1–1 | 3–2 | |
| 2013–14 | Sheriff Tiraspol | Group K | (England) Tottenham Hotspur | 0–2 | 1–2 | 3rd | |
| 2013–14 | Sheriff Tiraspol | Group K | (Russia) Anzhi Makhachkala | 0–0 | 1–1 | 3rd | |
| 2013–14 | Sheriff Tiraspol | Group K | (Norway) Tromsø | 2–0 | 1–1 | 3rd | |
| 2014–15 | Tiraspol | First qualifying round | (Azerbaijan) Inter Baku | 2–3 | 1–3 | 3–6 | |
| 2014–15 | Veris Chișinău | First qualifying round | (Bulgaria) Litex Lovech | 0–0 | 0–3 | 0–3 | |
| 2014–15 | Zimbru Chișinău | First qualifying round | (North Macedonia) Shkëndija | 2–0 | 1–2 | 3–2 | |
| 2014–15 | Zimbru Chișinău | Second qualifying round | (Bulgaria) CSKA Sofia | 0–0 | 1–1 | 1–1 (a) | |
| 2014–15 | Zimbru Chișinău | Third qualifying round | (Austria) Grödig | 0–1 | 2–1 | 2–2 (a) | |
| 2014–15 | Zimbru Chișinău | Play-off round | (Greece) PAOK | 1–0 | 0–4 | 1–4 | |
| 2014–15 | Sheriff Tiraspol | Play-off round | (Croatia) Rijeka | 0–3 | 0–1 | 0–4 | |
| 2015–16 | Sheriff Tiraspol | First qualifying round | (Norway) Odds BK | 0–3 | 0–0 | 0–3 | |
| 2015–16 | Saxan | First qualifying round | (Cyprus) Apollon Limassol | 0–2 | 0–2 | 0–4 | |
| 2015–16 | Dacia Chișinău | First qualifying round | (North Macedonia) Renova | 4–1 | 1–0 | 5–1 | |
| 2015–16 | Dacia Chișinău | Second qualifying round | (Slovakia) MŠK Žilina | 1–2 | 2–4 | 3–6 | |
| 2015–16 | Milsami Orhei | Play-off round | (France) Saint-Étienne | 1–1 | 0–1 | 1–2 | |
| 2016–17 | Zaria Bălți | First qualifying round | (Hungary) Videoton | 2–0 | 0–3 | 2–3 | |
| 2016–17 | Dacia Chișinău | First qualifying round | (Azerbaijan) Kapaz Ganja | 0–1 | 0–0 | 0–1 | |
| 2016–17 | Zimbru Chișinău | First qualifying round | (Georgia (country)) Chikhura Sachkhere | 0–1 | 3–2 | 3–3 (a) | |
| 2016–17 | Zimbru Chișinău | Second qualifying round | (Turkey) Osmanlıspor | 2–2 | 0–5 | 2–7 | |
| 2017–18 | Dacia Chișinău | First qualifying round | (North Macedonia) Shkëndija | 0–4 | 0–3 | 0–7 | |
| 2017–18 | Milsami Orhei | First qualifying round | (Luxembourg) Fola Esch | 1–1 | 1–2 | 2–3 | |
| 2017–18 | Zaria Bălți | First qualifying round | (Bosnia and Herzegovina) Sarajevo | 2–1 | 1–2 (a.e.t) | 3–3 (6–5 p) | |
| 2017–18 | Zaria Bălți | Second qualifying round | (Cyprus) Apollon Limassol | 1–2 | 0–3 | 1–5 | |
| 2017–18 | Sheriff Tiraspol | Play-off round | (Poland) Legia Warsaw | 0–0 | 1–1 | 1–1 (a) | |
| 2017–18 | Sheriff Tiraspol | Group F | (Denmark) København | 0–0 | 0–2 | 3rd | |
| 2017–18 | Sheriff Tiraspol | Group F | (Russia) Lokomotiv Moscow | 1–1 | 2–1 | 3rd | |
| 2017–18 | Sheriff Tiraspol | Group F | (Czech Republic) Fastav Zlín | 1–0 | 0–0 | 3rd | |
| 2018–19 | Milsami Orhei | First qualifying round | (Slovakia) Slovan Bratislava | 2–4 | 0–5 | 2–9 | |
| 2018–19 | Petrocub Hîncești | First qualifying round | (Croatia) Osijek | 1–1 | 1–2 | 2–3 | |
| 2018–19 | Zaria Bălți | First qualifying round | (Poland) Górnik Zabrze | 1–1 | 0–1 | 1–2 | |
| 2018–19 | Sheriff Tiraspol | Third qualifying round | (Iceland) Valur Reykjavík | 1–0 | 1–2 | 2–2 (a) | |
| 2018–19 | Sheriff Tiraspol | Play-off round | (Azerbaijan) Qarabağ | 1–0 | 0–3 | 1–3 | |
| 2019–20 | Milsami Orhei | First qualifying round | (Romania) FCSB | 1–2 | 0–2 | 1–4 | |
| 2019–20 | Petrocub Hîncești | First qualifying round | (Cyprus) AEK Larnaca | 0–1 | 0–1 | 0–2 | |
| 2019–20 | Speranța Nisporeni | First qualifying round | (Azerbaijan) Neftçi Baku | 0–3 | 0–6 | 0–9 | |
| 2019–20 | Sheriff Tiraspol | Second qualifying round | (Albania) Partizani Tirana | 1–1 | 1–0 | 2–1 | |
| 2019–20 | Sheriff Tiraspol | Third qualifying round | (Sweden) AIK Stockholm | 1–2 | 1–1 | 2–3 | |
| 2020–21 | Petrocub Hîncești | First qualifying round | (Serbia) TSC | 0–2 | — | — | |
| 2020–21 | Dinamo-Auto | First qualifying round | (Latvia) Ventspils | — | 1–2 | — | |
| 2020–21 | Sfîntul Gheorghe | First qualifying round | (Belarus) Shakhtyor Soligorsk | — | 0–0 (4–1 p) | — | |
| 2020–21 | Sfîntul Gheorghe | Second qualifying round | (Serbia) Partizan | 0–1 (a.e.t) | — | — | |
| 2020–21 | Sheriff Tiraspol | Third qualifying round | (Republic of Ireland) Dundalk | 1–1 (3–5 p) | — | — | |
| 2021–22 | Sheriff Tiraspol | Knockout round play-off | (Portugal) Braga | 2–0 | 0–2 (a.e.t) | 2–2 (2–3 p) | |
| 2022–23 | Sheriff Tiraspol | Play-off round | (Armenia) Pyunik | 0–0 (a.e.t) | 0–0 | 0–0 (3–2 p) | |
| 2022–23 | Sheriff Tiraspol | Group E | (England) Manchester United | 0–2 | 0–3 | 3rd | CO |
| 2022–23 | Sheriff Tiraspol | Group E | (Spain) Real Sociedad | 0–2 | 0–3 | 3rd | CO |
| 2022–23 | Sheriff Tiraspol | Group E | (Cyprus) Omonia | 1–0 | 3–0 | 3rd | CO |
| 2023–24 | Sheriff Tiraspol | Third qualifying round | (Belarus) BATE Borisov | 5–1 | 2–2 | 7–3 | |
| 2023–24 | Sheriff Tiraspol | Play-off round | (Faroe Islands) KÍ Klaksvík | 2–1 | 1–1 | 3–2 | |
| 2023–24 | Sheriff Tiraspol | Group G | (Italy) Roma | 1–2 | 0–3 | 4th | |
| 2023–24 | Sheriff Tiraspol | Group G | (Czech Republic) Slavia Prague | 2–3 | 0–6 | 4th | |
| 2023–24 | Sheriff Tiraspol | Group G | (Switzerland) Servette | 1–1 | 1–2 | 4th | |
| 2024–25 | Sheriff Tiraspol | First qualifying round | (Azerbaijan) Zira | 0–1 | 2–1 (a.e.t) | 2–2 (5–4 p) | |
| 2024–25 | Sheriff Tiraspol | Second qualifying round | (Sweden) Elfsborg | 0–1 | 0–2 | 0–3 | CO |
| 2024–25 | Petrocub Hîncești | Third qualifying round | (Wales) The New Saints | 1–0 | 0–0 | 1–0 | |
| 2024–25 | Petrocub Hîncești | Play-off round | (Bulgaria) Ludogorets Razgrad | 1–2 | 0–4 | 1–6 | CO |
| 2025–26 | Sheriff Tiraspol | First qualifying round | (Kosovo) Prishtina | 4–0 | 1–2 | 5–2 | |
| 2025–26 | Sheriff Tiraspol | Second qualifying round | (Netherlands) Utrecht | 1–3 | 1–4 | 2–7 | CO |
| 2026–27 | Sheriff Tiraspol | First qualifying round | (Slovenia) Aluminij | 0–0 | 1–0 | 1–0 | |
| 2026–27 | Sheriff Tiraspol | Second qualifying round | (Israel) Maccabi Tel Aviv | 0–5 | 0–1 | 0–6 | CO |

=== UEFA Conference League ===
| Season | Club | Round | Opponent | Home | Away | Agg. |
|---|---|---|---|---|---|---|
UEFA Europa Conference League
| 2021–22 | Sfîntul Gheorghe | First qualifying round | (Albania) Partizani Tirana | 2–3 | 2–5 | 4–8 |
| 2021–22 | Petrocub Hîncești | First qualifying round | (North Macedonia) Sileks | 1–0 | 1–1 | 2–1 |
| 2021–22 | Petrocub Hîncești | Second qualifying round | (Turkey) Sivasspor | 0–1 | 0–1 | 0–2 |
| 2021–22 | Milsami Orhei | First qualifying round | (Bosnia and Herzegovina) Sarajevo | 0–0 | 1–0 | 1–0 |
| 2021–22 | Milsami Orhei | Second qualifying round | (Sweden) Elfsborg | 0–5 | 0–4 | 0–9 |
| 2022–23 | Sfîntul Gheorghe | First qualifying round | (Slovenia) Mura | 1–2 | 1–2 | 2–4 |
| 2022–23 | Milsami Orhei | First qualifying round | (Lithuania) Panevėžys | 2–0 | 0–0 | 2–0 |
| 2022–23 | Milsami Orhei | Second qualifying round | (Finland) KuPS | 1–4 | 2–2 | 3–6 |
| 2022–23 | Petrocub Hîncești | First qualifying round | (Malta) Floriana | 1–0 | 0–0 | 1–0 |
| 2022–23 | Petrocub Hîncești | Second qualifying round | (Albania) Laçi | 0–0 | 4–1 | 4–1 |
| 2022–23 | Petrocub Hîncești | Third qualifying round | (Hungary) Fehérvár | 1–2 | 0–5 | 1–7 |
| 2022–23 | Sheriff Tiraspol | Knockout round play-off | (Serbia) Partizan | 0–1 | 3–1 | 3–2 |
| 2022–23 | Sheriff Tiraspol | Round of 16 | (France) Nice | 0–1 | 1–3 | 1–4 |
| 2023–24 | Milsami Orhei | First qualifying round | (Lithuania) Panevėžys | 0–1 | 2–2 | 2–3 |
| 2023–24 | Zimbru Chișinău | First qualifying round | (San Marino) La Fiorita | 1–0 | 1–1 | 2–1 |
| 2023–24 | Zimbru Chișinău | Second qualifying round | (Turkey) Fenerbahçe | 0–4 | 0–5 | 0–9 |
| 2023–24 | Petrocub Hîncești | Second qualifying round | (Israel) Maccabi Tel Aviv | 0–2 | 0–3 | 0–5 |
UEFA Conference League
| 2024–25 | Milsami Orhei | First qualifying round | (Belarus) Torpedo-BelAZ | 0–0 | 4–2 | 4–2 |
| 2024–25 | Milsami Orhei | Second qualifying round | (Kazakhstan) Astana | 1–1 | 0–1 | 1–2 |
| 2024–25 | Zimbru Chișinău | Second qualifying round | Ararat-Armenia | 0–3 | 1–3 | 1–6 |
| 2024–25 | Sheriff Tiraspol | Third qualifying round | (Slovenia) Olimpija Ljubljana | 0–1 | 0–3 | 0–4 |
| 2024–25 | Petrocub Hîncești | League phase | (Cyprus) Pafos | 1–4 | — | 36th |
| 2024–25 | Petrocub Hîncești | League phase | (Poland) Jagiellonia Białystok | — | 0–2 | 36th |
| 2024–25 | Petrocub Hîncești | League phase | (Austria) Rapid Wien | 0–3 | — | 36th |
| 2024–25 | Petrocub Hîncești | League phase | (Turkey) İstanbul Başakşehir | — | 1–1 | 36th |
| 2024–25 | Petrocub Hîncești | League phase | (Spain) Real Betis | 0–1 | — | 36th |
| 2024–25 | Petrocub Hîncești | League phase | (Scotland) Heart of Midlothian | — | 2–2 | 36th |
| 2025–26 | Petrocub Hîncești | First qualifying round | (Malta) Birkirkara | 3–0 | 0–1 | 3–1 |
| 2025–26 | Petrocub Hîncești | Second qualifying round | (Azerbaijan) Sabah | 0–2 | 1–4 | 1–6 |
| 2025–26 | Zimbru Chișinău | Second qualifying round | (Kazakhstan) Astana | 0–2 | 1–1 | 1–3 |
| 2025–26 | Milsami Orhei | Second qualifying round | (Montenegro) Budućnost | 1–0 | 0–0 | 1–0 |
| 2025–26 | Milsami Orhei | Third qualifying round | (San Marino) Virtus | 3–2 | 0–3 | 3–5 |
| 2025–26 | Sheriff Tiraspol | Third qualifying round | (Belgium) Anderlecht | 1–1 | 0–3 | 1–4 |
| 2026–27 | Milsami Orhei | First qualifying round | (Bosnia and Herzegovina) Velež | 0–1 | 1–1 | 1–2 |
| 2026–27 | Petrocub Hîncești | Second qualifying round | (Bosnia and Herzegovina) Borac | 3–3 | 0–3 | 3–6 |
| 2026–27 | Zimbru Chișinău | Second qualifying round | (Armenia) Noah | 1–1 | 1–2 | 2–3 |
| 2026–27 | Sheriff Tiraspol | Third qualifying round | (Switzerland) St. Gallen | 1–3 | 1–5 | 2–8 |
| 2027–28 | | First qualifying round | | | | |
| 2027–28 | | First qualifying round | | | | |
| 2027–28 | | Second qualifying round | | | | |

== Defunct competitions ==
=== UEFA Cup Winners' Cup ===
| Season | Club | Round | Opponent | Home | Away | Agg. |
|---|---|---|---|---|---|---|
| 1994–95 | Tiligul Tiraspol | Preliminary round | (Cyprus) Omonia | 0–1 | 1–3 | 1–4 |
| 1995–96 | Tiligul Tiraspol | Preliminary round | (Switzerland) Sion | 0–0 | 2–3 | 2–3 |
| 1996–97 | Constructorul Chișinău | Qualifying round | (Israel) Hapoel Ironi Rishon | 1–0 | 2–3 | 3–3 (a) |
| 1996–97 | Constructorul Chișinău | First round | (Turkey) Galatasaray | 0–1 | 0–4 | 0–5 |
| 1997–98 | Zimbru Chișinău | Qualifying round | (Ukraine) Shakhtar Donetsk | 1–1 | 0–3 | 1–4 |
| 1998–99 | Constructorul Chișinău | Qualifying round | (Slovenia) Rudar Velenje | 0–0 | 0–2 | 0–2 |

=== UEFA Intertoto Cup ===
| Season | Club | Round | Opponent | Home | Away | Agg. |
|---|---|---|---|---|---|---|
| 1999 | Tiligul Tiraspol | First round | (Poland) Polonia Warsaw | 0–0 | 0–4 | 0–4 |
| 2000 | Nistru Otaci | First round | (Wales) Cwmbrân Town | 1–0 | 1–0 | 2–0 |
| 2000 | Nistru Otaci | Second round | Austria Salzburg | 2–6 | 1–1 | 3–7 |
| 2001 | Tiligul Tiraspol | First round | (Northern Ireland) Cliftonville | 1–0 | 3–1 (a.e.t) | 4–1 |
| 2001 | Tiligul Tiraspol | Second round | (Hungary) Lombard Tatabánya | 1–1 | 0–4 | 1–5 |
| 2002 | Constructorul Cioburciu | First round | (Czech Republic) Synot | 0–0 | 0–4 | 0–4 |
| 2003 | Dacia Chișinău | First round | (Faroe Islands) GÍ Gøta | 4–1 | 1–0 | 5–1 |
| 2003 | Dacia Chișinău | Second round | (Albania) Partizani Tirana | 2–0 | 3–0 | 5–0 |
| 2003 | Dacia Chișinău | Third round | (Germany) Schalke 04 | 0–1 | 1–2 | 1–3 |
| 2005 | Tiligul-Tiras | First round | (Poland) Pogoń Szczecin | 0–3 | 2–6 | 2–9 |
| 2006 | Tiraspol | First round | (Azerbaijan) MKT-Araz İmişli | 2–0 | 0–1 | 2–1 |
| 2006 | Tiraspol | Second round | (Poland) Lech Poznań | 1–0 | 3–1 | 4–1 |
| 2006 | Tiraspol | Third round | (Austria) SV Ried | 1–1 | 1–3 | 2–4 |
| 2007 | Dacia Chișinău | First round | (Azerbaijan) Baku | 1–1 (a.e.t) | 1–1 | 2–2 (3–1 p) |
| 2007 | Dacia Chișinău | Second round | (Switzerland) St. Gallen | 0–1 | 1–0 (a.e.t) | 1–1 (3–0 p) |
| 2007 | Dacia Chișinău | Third round | (Germany) Hamburg | 1–1 | 0–4 | 1–5 |
| 2008 | Tiraspol | First round | (Armenia) Mika | 0–0 | 2–2 | 2–2 (a) |
| 2008 | Tiraspol | Second round | (Ukraine) Tavriya Simferopol | 0–0 | 1–3 | 1–3 |

== Overall record ==
As of 13 August 2026

=== By competition ===
| Competition | P | W | D | L | GF | GA | GD | Win % |
|---|---|---|---|---|---|---|---|---|
| UEFA Champions League | 126 | 46 | 26 | 54 | 135 | 137 | −2 | 36.51 |
| UEFA Europa League / UEFA Cup | 249 | 50 | 68 | 131 | 191 | 395 | −204 | 20.08 |
| UEFA Conference League | 68 | 11 | 18 | 39 | 57 | 128 | −71 | 16.18 |
| UEFA Cup Winners' Cup | 12 | 1 | 3 | 8 | 7 | 21 | −14 | 8.33 |
| UEFA Intertoto Cup | 36 | 12 | 11 | 13 | 38 | 53 | −15 | 33.33 |
| Total | 491 | 120 | 126 | 245 | 428 | 734 | −306 | 24.44 |

=== By country ===
Moldovan clubs have not yet faced an opponent from Gibraltar.

| Opponents | Pld | W | D | L | GF | GA | GD |
|---|---|---|---|---|---|---|---|
| Albania | 22 | 11 | 3 | 8 | 36 | 32 | +4 |
| Andorra | 2 | 2 | 0 | 0 | 5 | 0 | +5 |
| Armenia | 18 | 9 | 6 | 3 | 20 | 13 | +7 |
| Austria | 11 | 1 | 2 | 8 | 8 | 25 | −17 |
| Azerbaijan | 25 | 6 | 7 | 12 | 22 | 39 | −17 |
| Belarus | 17 | 3 | 8 | 6 | 22 | 24 | −2 |
| Belgium | 6 | 0 | 1 | 5 | 2 | 16 | −14 |
| Bosnia and Herzegovina | 12 | 3 | 5 | 4 | 9 | 12 | −3 |
| Bulgaria | 14 | 3 | 4 | 7 | 9 | 26 | −17 |
| Croatia | 16 | 1 | 5 | 10 | 10 | 28 | −18 |
| Cyprus | 13 | 2 | 1 | 10 | 8 | 21 | −13 |
| Czechia | 20 | 1 | 6 | 13 | 11 | 36 | −25 |
| Denmark | 2 | 0 | 1 | 1 | 0 | 2 | −2 |
| England | 6 | 0 | 1 | 5 | 1 | 12 | −11 |
| Estonia | 2 | 1 | 1 | 0 | 2 | 1 | +1 |
| Faroe Islands | 4 | 3 | 1 | 0 | 8 | 3 | +5 |
| Finland | 6 | 2 | 2 | 2 | 5 | 7 | −2 |
| France | 8 | 0 | 2 | 6 | 3 | 14 | −11 |
| Georgia | 12 | 5 | 0 | 7 | 16 | 19 | −3 |
| Germany | 8 | 0 | 2 | 6 | 4 | 20 | −16 |
| Greece | 6 | 1 | 1 | 4 | 3 | 10 | −7 |
| Hungary | 16 | 3 | 4 | 9 | 12 | 32 | −20 |
| Iceland | 2 | 1 | 0 | 1 | 2 | 2 | 0 |
| Ireland | 3 | 2 | 1 | 0 | 11 | 1 | +10 |
| Israel | 14 | 3 | 3 | 8 | 10 | 24 | −14 |
| Italy | 4 | 0 | 0 | 4 | 3 | 11 | −8 |
| Kazakhstan | 14 | 5 | 3 | 6 | 18 | 17 | +1 |
| Kosovo | 2 | 1 | 0 | 1 | 5 | 2 | +3 |
| Latvia | 5 | 3 | 0 | 2 | 5 | 4 | +1 |
| Liechtenstein | 2 | 1 | 0 | 1 | 1 | 2 | −1 |
| Lithuania | 4 | 1 | 2 | 1 | 4 | 3 | +1 |
| Luxembourg | 7 | 3 | 2 | 2 | 7 | 4 | +3 |
| Malta | 6 | 4 | 1 | 1 | 10 | 2 | +8 |
| Montenegro | 8 | 4 | 4 | 0 | 14 | 3 | +11 |
| Netherlands | 8 | 1 | 2 | 5 | 7 | 14 | −7 |
| North Macedonia | 10 | 4 | 2 | 4 | 10 | 12 | −2 |
| Northern Ireland | 2 | 2 | 0 | 0 | 4 | 1 | +3 |
| Norway | 6 | 1 | 2 | 3 | 4 | 8 | −4 |
| Poland | 11 | 2 | 4 | 5 | 8 | 19 | −11 |
| Portugal | 4 | 1 | 1 | 2 | 2 | 3 | −1 |
| Romania | 8 | 1 | 2 | 5 | 6 | 13 | −7 |
| Russia | 6 | 1 | 5 | 0 | 5 | 4 | +1 |
| San Marino | 4 | 2 | 1 | 1 | 5 | 6 | −1 |
| Scotland | 3 | 0 | 2 | 1 | 2 | 3 | −1 |
| Serbia | 10 | 3 | 3 | 4 | 10 | 12 | −2 |
| Serbia and Montenegro | 4 | 0 | 0 | 4 | 2 | 10 | −8 |
| Slovakia | 10 | 0 | 3 | 7 | 9 | 23 | −14 |
| Slovenia | 16 | 5 | 4 | 7 | 8 | 14 | −6 |
| Spain | 7 | 1 | 0 | 6 | 3 | 14 | −11 |
| Sweden | 14 | 2 | 3 | 9 | 9 | 25 | −16 |
| Switzerland | 14 | 2 | 2 | 10 | 9 | 30 | −21 |
| Turkey | 15 | 0 | 3 | 12 | 4 | 34 | −30 |
| Ukraine | 16 | 3 | 6 | 7 | 10 | 21 | −11 |
| Wales | 6 | 4 | 2 | 0 | 5 | 1 | +4 |

== Other European competition ==
=== UEFA Youth League ===
| Season | Club | Round | Opponent | Home | Away | Agg. |
|---|---|---|---|---|---|---|
| 2015–16 | Zimbru Chișinău | First round | (Czech Republic) Příbram | 1–2 | 0–2 | 1–4 |
| 2016–17 | Sheriff Tiraspol | First round | (Romania) Viitorul Constanța | 0–1 | 1–4 | 1–5 |
| 2017–18 | Zimbru Chișinău | First round | (Albania) Vllaznia Shkodër | 3–1 | 4–2 | 7–3 |
| 2017–18 | Zimbru Chișinău | Second round | (Norway) Molde | 0–0 | 0–2 | 0–2 |
| 2018–19 | Sheriff Tiraspol | First round | (Azerbaijan) Gabala | 1–3 | 1–1 | 2–4 |
| 2019–20 | Sheriff Tiraspol | First round | (Albania) Shkëndija Tiranë | 1–0 | 2–1 | 3–1 |
| 2019–20 | Sheriff Tiraspol | Second round | (Norway) Sogndal | 2–0 | 1–3 | 3–3 (a) |
| 2019–20 | Sheriff Tiraspol | Play-off round | (Serbia) Crvena zvezda | 0–0 (2–4 p) | — | — |
| 2021–22 | Sheriff Tiraspol | | | | | |
| 2021–22 | Sheriff Tiraspol | Group D | (Italy) Inter | 2–4 | 1–2 | 4th |
| 2021–22 | Sheriff Tiraspol | Group D | (Spain) Real Madrid | 0–1 | 1–4 | 4th |
| 2021–22 | Sheriff Tiraspol | Group D | (Ukraine) Shakhtar Donetsk | 0–5 | 0–6 | 4th |
| 2023–24 | Sheriff Tiraspol | First round | (Kazakhstan) Turan | 5–0 | 1–0 | 6–0 |
| 2023–24 | Sheriff Tiraspol | Second round | (Serbia) Partizan | 2–0 | 2–5 | 4–5 |
| 2024–25 | Academia Rebeja | First round | (Kazakhstan) Kairat | 1–4 | 1–2 | 2–6 |
| 2026–27 | Sheriff Tiraspol | Second round | (Romania) Farul Constanța | 3–1 | 0–2 | 3–3 (7–6 p) |
| 2026–27 | Sheriff Tiraspol | Third round | (Israel) Maccabi Tel Aviv | | | |

== Overall record ==
As of 4 November 2026

=== By competition ===
| Competition | P | W | D | L | GF | GA | GD | Win % |
|---|---|---|---|---|---|---|---|---|
| UEFA Youth League | 29 | 9 | 3 | 17 | 36 | 58 | −22 | 31.03 |

=== By country ===
| Opponents | Pld | W | D | L | GF | GA | GD |
|---|---|---|---|---|---|---|---|
| Albania | 4 | 4 | 0 | 0 | 10 | 4 | +6 |
| Azerbaijan | 2 | 0 | 1 | 1 | 2 | 4 | −2 |
| Czechia | 2 | 0 | 0 | 2 | 1 | 4 | −3 |
| Italy | 2 | 0 | 0 | 2 | 3 | 6 | −3 |
| Kazakhstan | 4 | 2 | 0 | 2 | 8 | 6 | +2 |
| Norway | 4 | 1 | 1 | 2 | 3 | 5 | −2 |
| Romania | 4 | 1 | 0 | 3 | 4 | 8 | −4 |
| Serbia | 3 | 1 | 1 | 1 | 4 | 5 | −1 |
| Spain | 2 | 0 | 0 | 2 | 1 | 5 | −4 |
| Ukraine | 2 | 0 | 0 | 2 | 0 | 11 | −11 |

== See also ==
- Moldovan women's football clubs in European competitions
