= 1. FC Lübars =

German sport club

- Full name: 1. Fußballclub Lübars 1962 e.V.
- Founded: 1962
- Ground: Sportplatz Schluchseestraße
- Capacity: 500
- League: Bezirksliga Berlin 1 (men)
- 2015–16 2015–16: 5th (women); 14th (men)

1. FC Lübars is a German sport club from Lübars. The club was founded 1962 and competes in football. The club is most known for its women's football section. The men′s team currently competes in the Bezirksliga Berlin 1, the eight level in the German football league system.

== Women's football ==
The club opened its women's football section in 1971. In 2009, the women's section signed a cooperation with Hertha BSC to represent them in the women competitions, including 2. Bundesliga and DFB–Pokal. They were the champion of the 2014–15 2. Bundesliga (women), but since they failed to get a license to play in the Bundesliga (women), they were not granted a promotion. Due to financial issues, they lost their 2. Bundesliga license and got relegated. They were planned to compete in the BerlinLiga, but also later on pulled out. They will start football activities again in 2017, by competing in the Bezirksliga.

== Current squad ==
As of 8 July 2018

Note: Flags indicate national team as defined under FIFA eligibility rules; some limited exceptions apply. Players may hold more than one non-FIFA nationality.

| No. | Pos. | Nation | Player |
|---|---|---|---|
| — | GK | GER | Inga Buchholz |
| — | DF | ROU | Monika Sinka |
| — | MF | HUN | Zsofia Racz |
| — | MF | GER | Luisa Buchwalder |
| — | FW | GER | Madeleine Wojtecki |
| — | FW | GER | Dilara Türk |
| — | DF | GER | Vanessa Lux |

| No. | Pos. | Nation | Player |
|---|---|---|---|
| — | MF | GER | Aylin Yaren |
| — | FW | GER | Cagla Korkmaz |
| — | MF | GER | Selina Grosch |
| — | DF | GER | Celine Dey |
| — | MF | GER | Jaqueline Behrends |
| — | MF | AUT | Jelena Prvulović |

=== Former players ===
- (Hungary) Erika Szuh

== Honours ==
- 2. Bundesliga
  - Winner: 2014–15
- Regionalliga Nordost
  - Winner: 1992–93

== Recent seasons ==
| Season | League | Place | W | D | L | GF | GA | Pts | DFB-Cup |
|---|---|---|---|---|---|---|---|---|---|
| 2010–11 | 2. Bundesliga (II) | 4 | 12 | 3 | 7 | 43 | 40 | 39 | Second round |
| 2011–12 | 2. Bundesliga (II) | 8 | 7 | 4 | 11 | 23 | 52 | 25 | Second round |
| 2012–13 | 2. Bundesliga (II) | 7 | 9 | 2 | 11 | 31 | 28 | 29 | Second round |
| 2013–14 | 2. Bundesliga (II) | 7 | 7 | 5 | 10 | 34 | 32 | 26 | Second round |
| 2014–15 | 2. Bundesliga (II) | 1 | 16 | 3 | 3 | 53 | 12 | 51 | Second round |
| 2015–16 | 2. Bundesliga (II) | 5 | 11 | 3 | 8 | 49 | 29 | 20 | Quarterfinals |
Green marks a season followed by promotion, red a season followed by relegation.
