= Gabriella Pincze =

Hungarian footballer

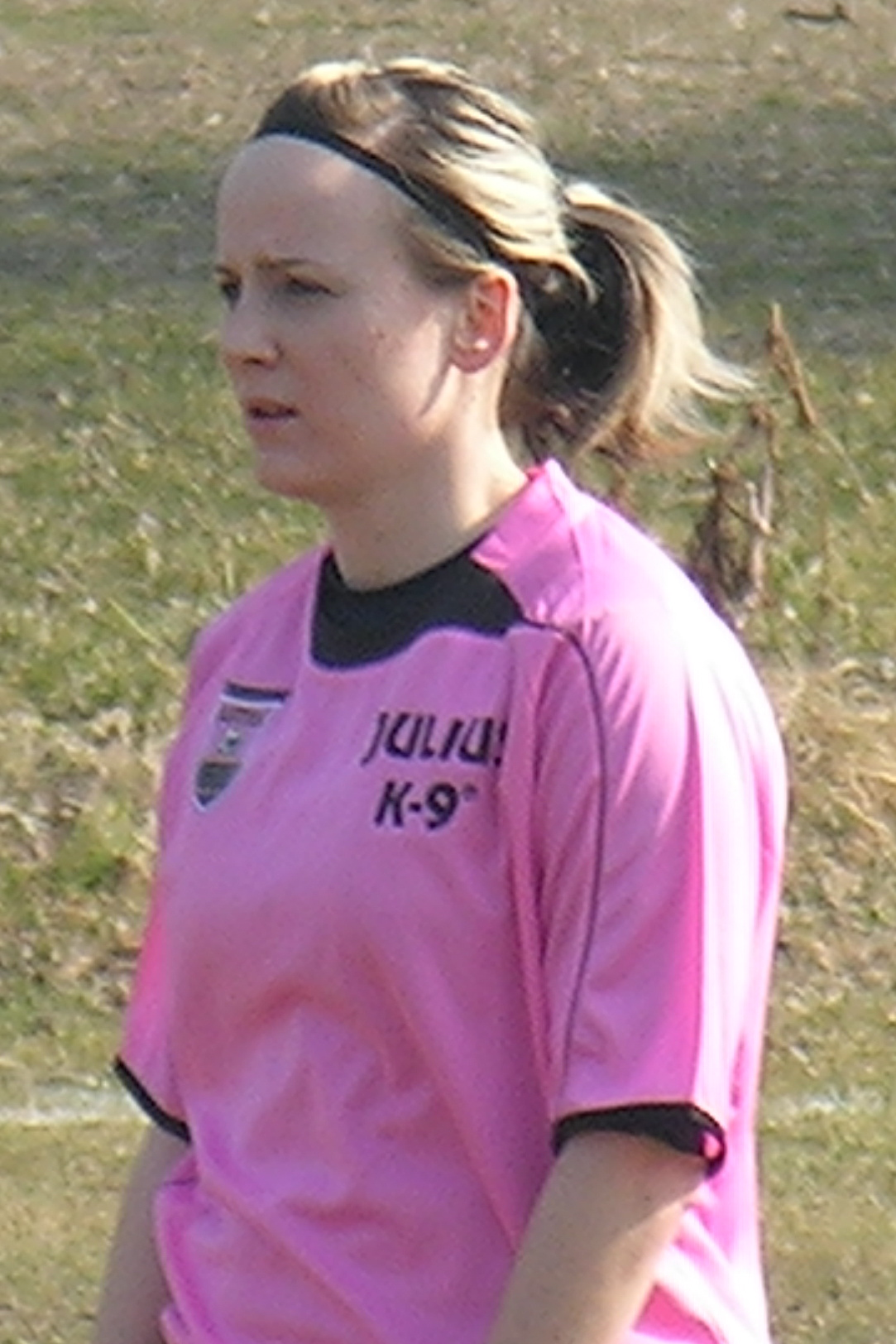
- Pincze with Astra Hungary in 2012

Personal information
- Full name: Gabriella Csilla Pincze
- Date of birth: 19 April 1989 (age 37)
- Position: Midfielder

Senior career*
Years	Team	Apps	(Gls)
2006–2008	Femina	59	(0)
2009–2011	Taksony-Bíró-Kert	54	(11)
2011–2015	Astra Hungary	49	(8)

International career^{‡}
2013	Hungary	1	(0)
- * Club domestic league appearances and goals ‡ National team caps and goals as of 7 May 2014.

Gabriella Csilla Pincze (born 19 April 1989) is a Hungarian footballer who plays as a midfielder. She has been a member of the Hungary women's national team.

== Club career ==
Pincze has played for 1. FC Femina, Taksony-Bíró-Kert SE and Astra Hungary FC in Hungary.

== International career ==
Pincze capped for Hungary at senior level during the 2015 FIFA Women's World Cup qualification – UEFA Group 7.
