= Eszter Papp =

Hungarian footballer

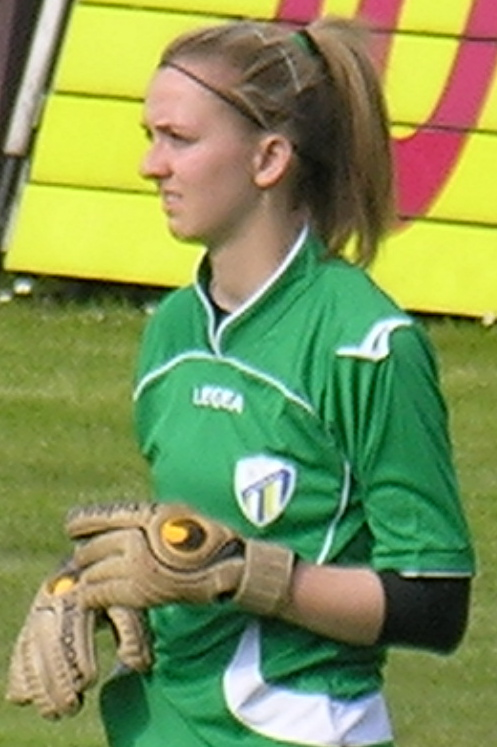

Personal information
- Full name: Eszter Papp
- Date of birth: 12 September 1989 (age 37)
- Place of birth: Szombathely, Hungary
- Position: Goalkeeper

Senior career*
Years	Team	Apps	(Gls)
2004–	Viktória FC-Szombathely		

International career^{‡}
2008–	Hungary	6	(0)
- * Club domestic league appearances and goals ‡ National team caps and goals as of 24 August 2012

Eszter Papp (born 12 September 1989 in Szombathely) is a Hungarian football goalkeeper currently playing in the Hungarian First Division for Viktória FC-Szombathely. She is a member of the Hungarian national team.
