= Erika Szuh =

Hungarian footballer

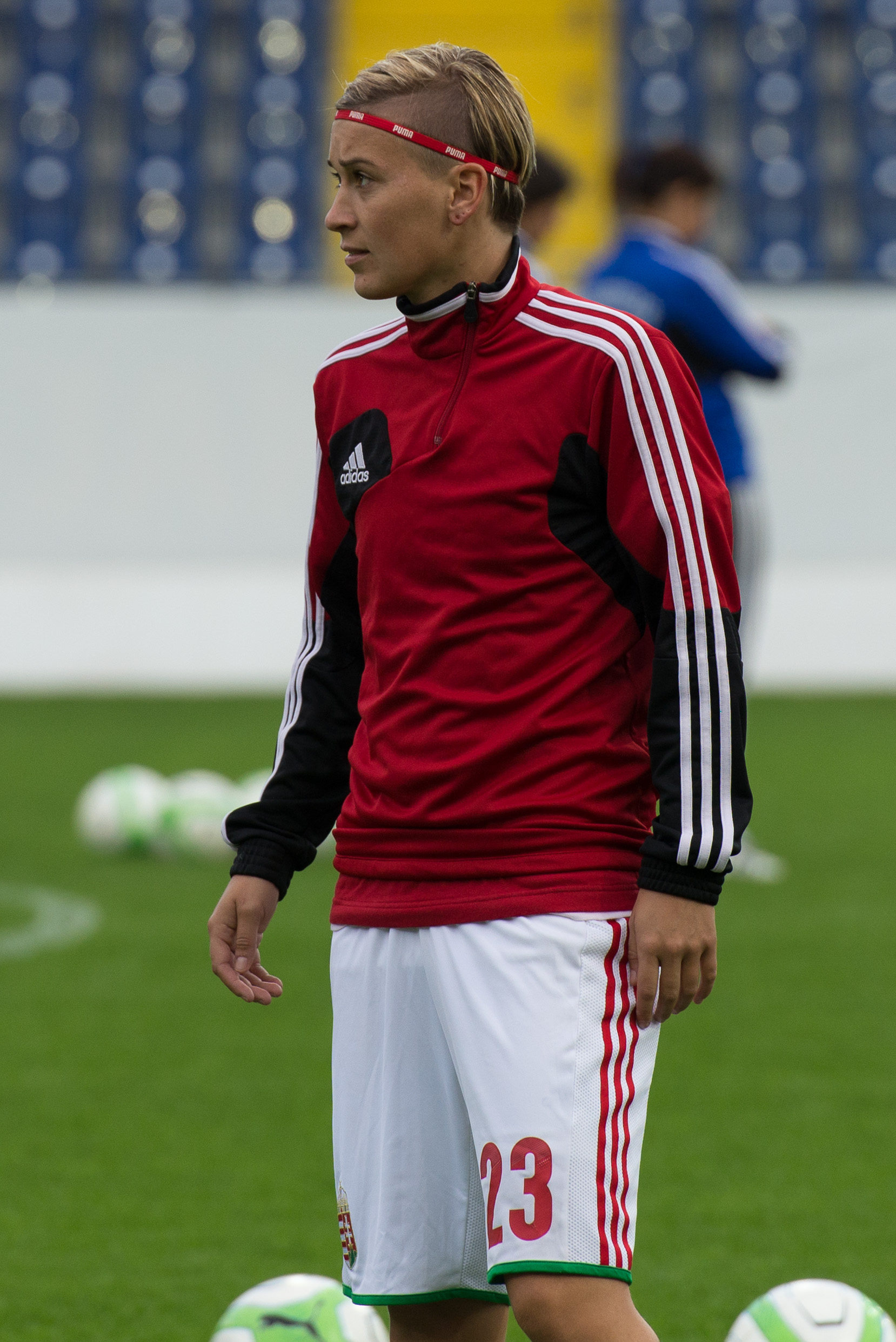

Personal information
- Full name: Erika Szuh
- Date of birth: 21 February 1990 (age 36)
- Place of birth: Celldömölk, Hungary
- Height: 1.65 m (5 ft 5 in)
- Position: Midfielder

Team information
- Current team: Türkiyemspor Berlin
- Number: 23

Senior career*
Years	Team	Apps	(Gls)
2006–2010	Viktória FC-Szombathely	110	(73)
2010–2013	Lokomotive Leipzig	59	(5)
2013–2015	1. FC Lübars	44	(18)
2015	FC Neunkirch	8	(4)
2016	1. FC Lübars	11	(1)
2016–2018	Blau-Weiß Hohen Neuendorf	43	(8)
2018–	Türkiyemspor Berlin		

International career^{‡}
2009–	Hungary	62	(6)

Managerial career
- 2022–: Türkiyemspor Berlin (player-coach)
- * Club domestic league appearances and goals as of 21 August 2022 ‡ National team caps and goals as of 23 November 2016

Erika Szuh (born 21 February 1990) is a Hungarian footballer who plays as a midfielder for the German club Türkiyemspor Berlin and the Hungary national team. She previously represented Lokomotive Leipzig, FC Lübars of Germany's Frauen-Bundesliga and the Swiss club FC Neunkirch.

In 2010 she went from Hungary to Germany, signing for Lokomotive Leipzig whose women section folded in 2013. Szuh then went to Berlin, signing for 1. FC Lübars. In summer 2015 Szuh was transferred to FC Neunkirch of the Swiss Nationalliga A. She returned after one year, before switching to Blau-Weiß Hohen Neuendorf. In 2018 she signed with Türkiyemspor Berlin, then playing in the fourth tier Berlin-Liga. She won promotion with her club in 2020 to the Regionalliga. In March 2022 she started coaching her team as a player-coach.
