= Dilara Türk =

Turkish-German footballer (born 1996)

Personal information
- Date of birth: July 30, 1996 (age 30)
- Place of birth: Kulmbach, Germany
- Position: Midfielder

Team information
- Current team: Viktoria 1889 Berlin

Youth career
- 2009–2012: 1. FC Nürnberg

Senior career*
Years	Team	Apps	(Gls)
2013–2014	SpVgg Bayreuth	6	(15)
2014–2015	ETSV Würzburg	17	(0)
2015–2016	1. FC Lübars	12	(0)
2016	1. FC Union Berlin	3	(0)
2017–	Viktoria 1889 Berlin	13	(4)

International career^{‡}
2015	Turkey U-19	5	(0)
2015	Turkey	5	(0)
- * Club domestic league appearances and goals as of October 11, 2015 ‡ National team caps and goals as of November 30, 2015

Dilara Türk (born July 30, 1996) is a Turkish-German female football midfielder currently playing in the Regionalliga for Viktoria 1889 Berlin. She is part of the Turkey women's U-19 and Turkey women's team.

== Family life ==
Dilara Türk was born to Turkish immigrant parents in Kulmbach, Germany on July 30, 1996. In 2015, she plans to work at the Frankfurt Airport after her graduation from the vocational school.

== Playing career ==
=== Club ===
Dilara Türk began her football career at the youth team of 1. FC Nürnberg. she played five years in the team, which is the second force in Bavaria at youth level behind FC Bayern Munich. She became a member of the Bavaria selection. Considered one of the greatest women's football talents in Upper Franconia skilled in speed, technique and overview, she lost her joy for football and took a half-year break from sport. In the summer of 2014, she returned to play in the German 2. Bundesliga South for ETSV Würzburg. She capped 17 times in the 2014–15 season. She later joined 1. FC Lübars in the German 2. Bundesliga. Subsequently, she played for 1. FC Union Berlin in 2016, before joining Viktoria 1889 Berlin a year later.

=== International ===
At age 13 only in 2010, Dilara Türk's vision was to be a member of the German women's national football team.

She was admitted to the Turkey women's U-19, debuting in the friendly match against Bosnia and Herzegovina on March 17, 2015.

Dilara Türk played the first time for the Turkey women's team in the UEFA Women's Euro 2017 qualifying Group 5 match against Croatia on September 17, 2015. She capped in five matches of the tournament.
