= Katalin Fogl =

Hungarian football forward

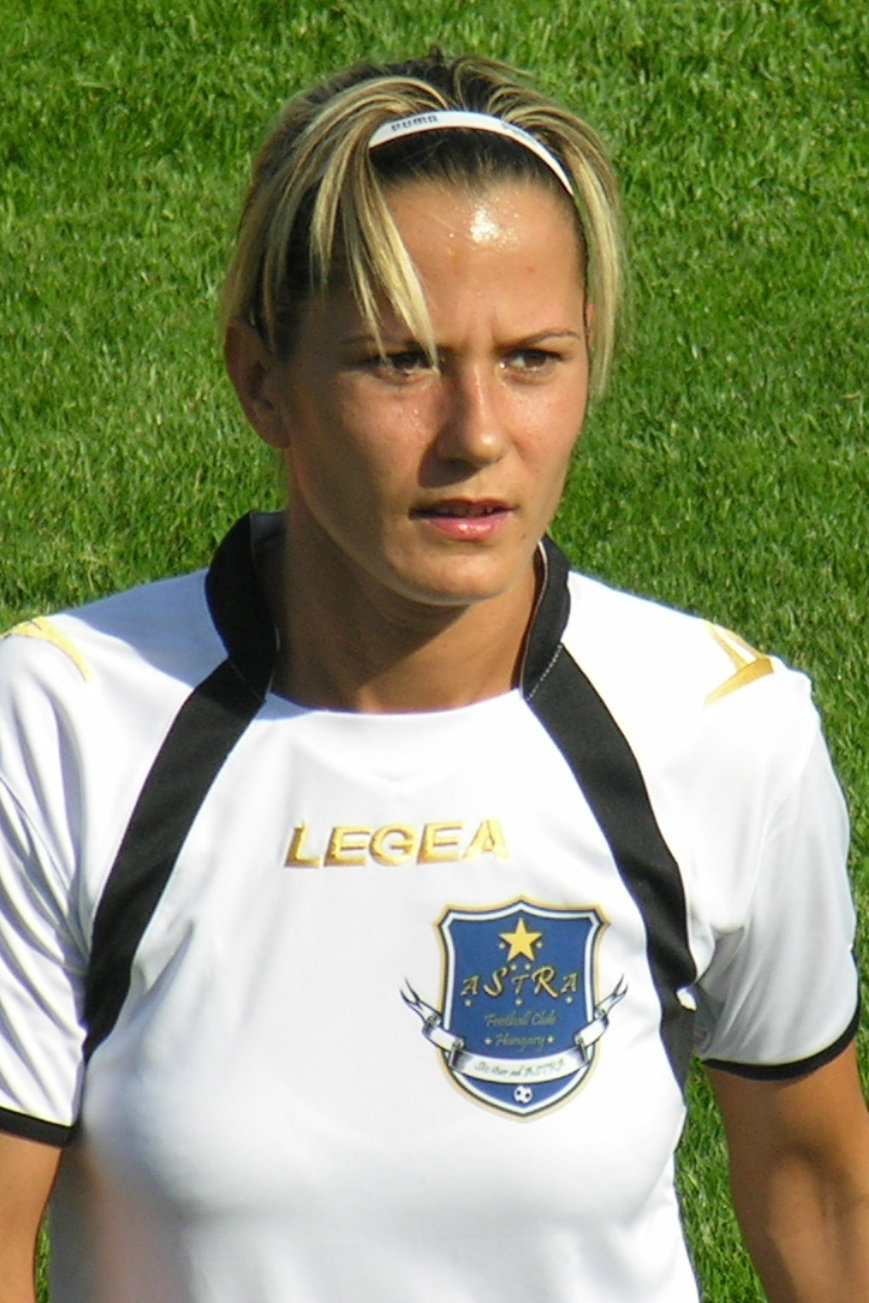

Personal information
- Full name: Katalin Fogl
- Date of birth: 7 November 1983 (age 42)
- Place of birth: Budapest, Hungary
- Position: Forward

Senior career*
Years	Team	Apps	(Gls)
?–2005	László Kórház SC		
2005–2008	1. FC Femina		
2008–2011	Újpesti TE		
2010–2011	→ Taksony SE (loan)		
2012–	Astra Hungary FC		

International career^{‡}
2004–2013	Hungary	25	(3)
- * Club domestic league appearances and goals ‡ National team caps and goals as of 31 May 2013

Katalin Fogl (born 7 November 1983 in Budapest) is a Hungarian football forward currently playing in the Hungarian First Division for Astra Hungary FC. With 1. FC Femina she has played the UEFA Women'sChampions League. She is a member of the Hungarian national team.
