= Rhian Nokes =

Welsh footballer and rugby player

Personal information
- Date of birth: 13 February 1989 (age 37)
- Place of birth: Port Talbot, Wales
- Height: 1.69 m (5 ft 7 in)
- Position: Goalkeeper

Senior career*
| Years | Team | Apps | (Gls) |
- Cardiff City

International career
| 2010–2014 | Wales | 8 | (0) |
- * Club domestic league appearances and goals

Rhian Nokes (born 13 February 1989) is a Welsh former footballer and rugby player. She began playing football with Cardiff City as a goalkeeper and represented the Wales women's national side. She later switched to playing rugby union.

In 2018, she was convicted of sex offences against a minor after entering into a relationship with a child while working as a sports coach.

== Early life ==
Nokes was born in Port Talbot, growing up in the Taibach area.

== Football career ==
Nokes played for Cardiff City as a goalkeeper. She captained the side to the FAW Women's Cup in 2012 after defeating UWIC in the final.

Nokes made 17 appearances for Wales at under-19 level. In August 2006 Nokes won her first cap for the senior Wales women's national football team, in a 3–0 friendly match defeat by Bulgaria at the National Sports Academy "Vasil Levski" in Sofia. She remained part of the Wales squad at the 2013 Algarve Cup, where she won her 34th cap.

== Rugby career ==
Nokes played club rugby for Maesteg Celtic and Pencoed Phoenix.

Nokes represented the Wales women's national rugby union team, being one of six uncapped players named in the squad for the 2016 Women's Six Nations Championship. Following her conviction in 2018, Nokes was given a lifetime ban by the Welsh Rugby Union.

== Personal life ==
In June 2018, Nokes was sentenced to seven years in prison at Swansea Crown Court after pleading guilty to counts of sexual activity with a child, inciting a child to engage in sexual activity, and sexual activity with a child while in a position of trust. She had been pretending to suffer from a brain tumour and was accused of using the illness and her position as a sports coach to engage in a relationship with a 15-year old girl. Nokes had been employed at a school in Neath when she met the pupil who was 13 at the time. Nokes claimed that she was suffering from a terminal brain tumour, shaved her head and faked seizures to trick people. The pupil later informed police that Nokes had "manipulated" her into a relationship.

A spokesperson for the Crown Prosecution Service later commented "Nokes hid behind her reputation as an accomplished sportswoman and abused the position of trust ... to manipulate the victim and fulfil her own sexual gratification." Nokes was placed on the sex offenders registry for life and was also issued a restraining order against contacting the victim.
