= Alexandra Tóth (footballer, born 1991) =

Hungarian footballer

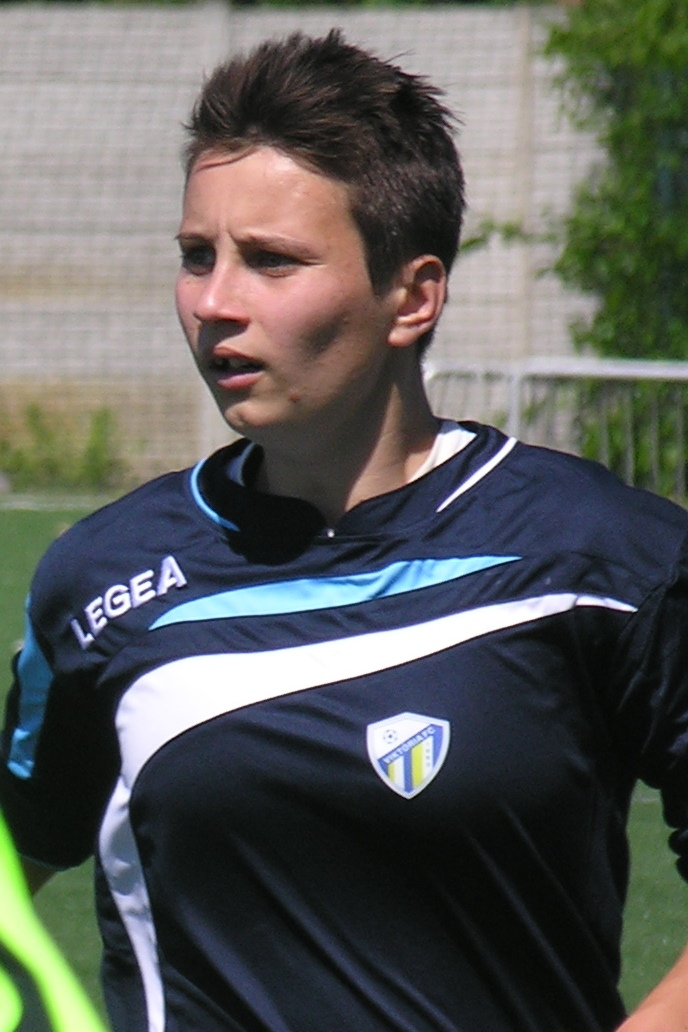

Personal information
- Full name: Alexandra Tóth
- Date of birth: 29 January 1991 (age 35)
- Place of birth: Zalaegerszeg, Hungary
- Position: Defender

Senior career*
Years	Team	Apps	(Gls)
2005–2009	Nagykutas NLSE		
2009–	Viktória FC-Szombathely		

International career^{‡}
2009–	Hungary	33	(0)
- * Club domestic league appearances and goals ‡ National team caps and goals as of 26 October 2013

Alexandra Tóth (born 29 January 1991 in Zalaegerszeg) is a Hungarian football defender currently playing in the Hungarian First Division for Viktória FC, with whom she has also played the Champions League. She is a member of the Hungarian national team.
