= Boglárka Szabó =

Hungarian footballer

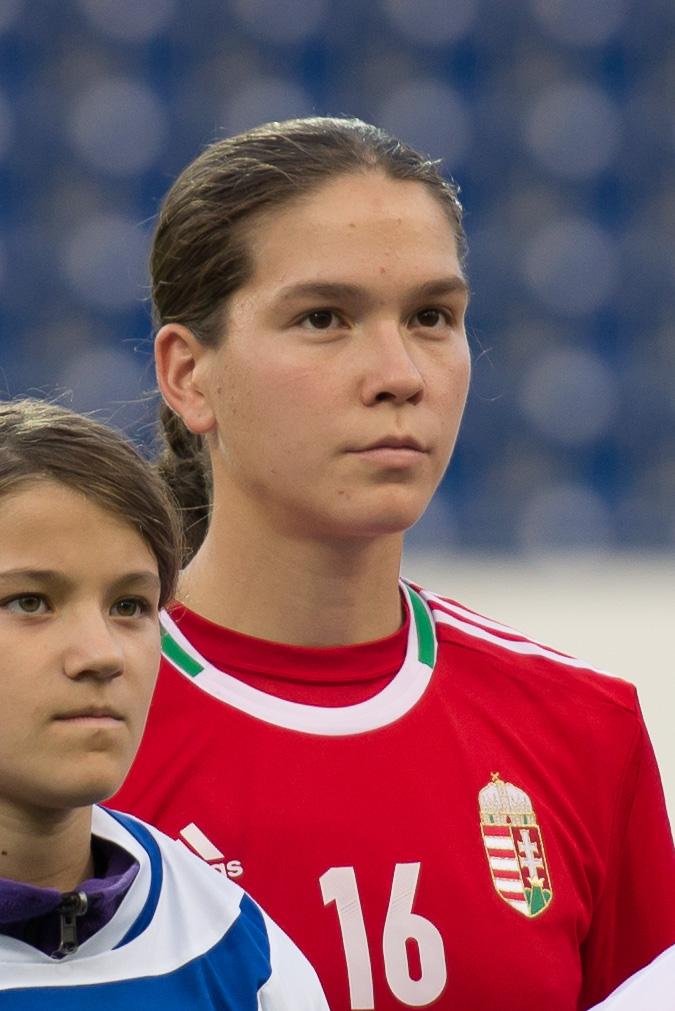

Personal information
- Full name: Boglárka Szabó
- Date of birth: 12 February 1993 (age 33)
- Place of birth: Budapest, Hungary
- Position: Midfielder

Team information
- Current team: Astra Hungary
- Number: 10

Senior career*
Years	Team	Apps	(Gls)
2008–	Astra Hungary	61	(45)

International career^{‡}
2010–	Hungary	43	(2)
- * Club domestic league appearances and goals ‡ National team caps and goals as of 17 June 2015

Boglárka Szabó is a Hungarian football midfielder currently playing in the Hungarian 1st Division for Astra Hungary FC. Currently an U-19 international, she made her debut with the senior Hungarian national team in the 2011 World Cup qualifying.
