= Szilvia Szeitl =

Hungarian footballer

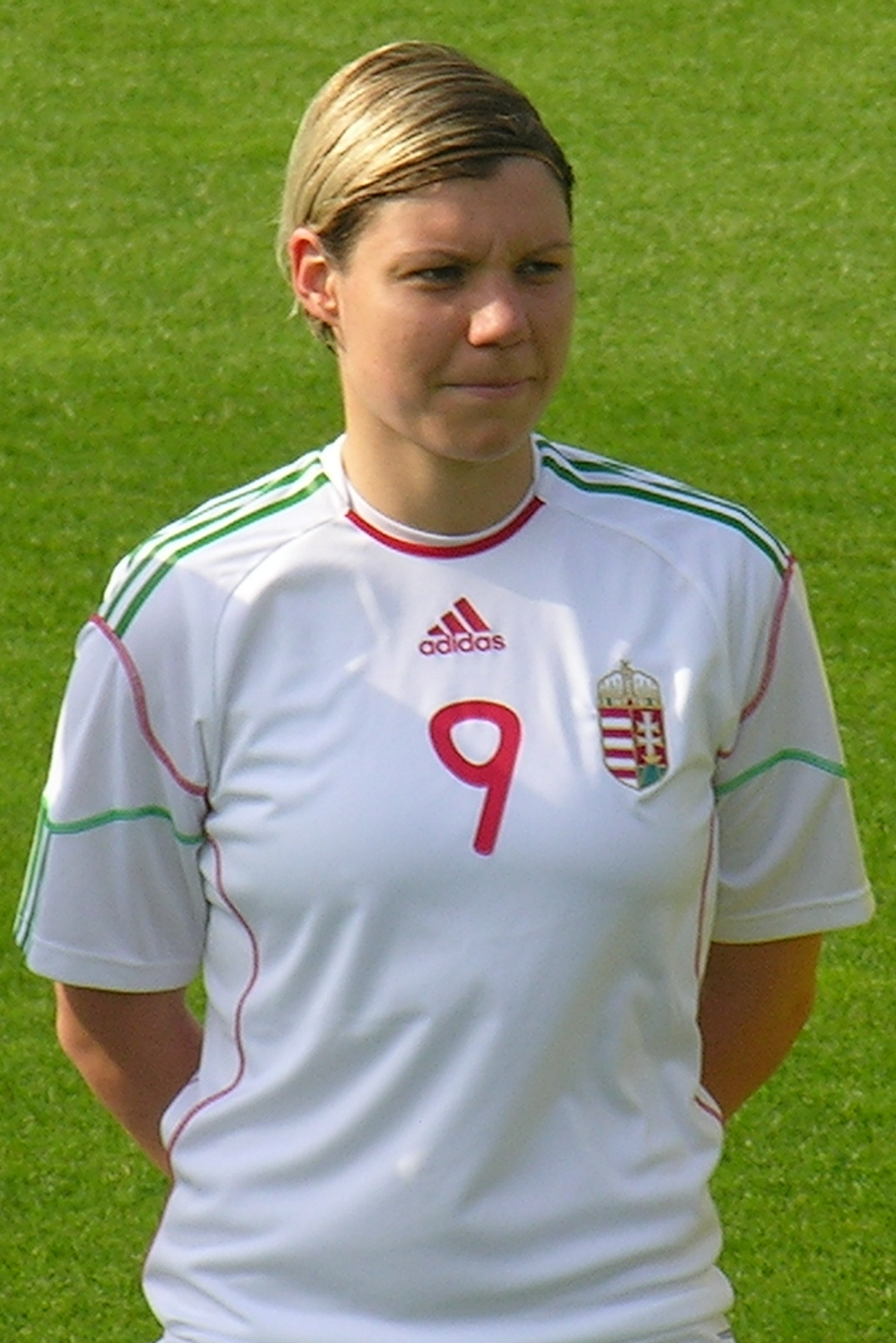

Personal information
- Full name: Szilvia Szeitl
- Date of birth: 26 April 1987 (age 39)
- Place of birth: Budapest, Hungary
- Position: Defender

Senior career*
Years	Team	Apps	(Gls)
2003–	1. FC Femina		

International career^{‡}
2007–	Hungary	95	(2)
- * Club domestic league appearances and goals ‡ National team caps and goals as of 5 October 2018

Szilvia Szeitl (born 26 April 1987 in Budapest) is a Hungarian football defender currently playing in the Hungarian First Division for 1. FC Femina, with whom she has also played the Champions League. She is a member of the Hungarian national team.
