= Astra Hungary FC =

Astra Hungary
- Full name: Astra Hungary Football Club
- Founded: 1990
- Ground: Csepel HC Sporttelep, Budapest
- Capacity: 4,000
- League: Női NB II
- 2024–25: 12th in First division (relegated)
- Website: http://www.astrahfc.com
Home colours	Away colours

Astra Hungary FC, a.k.a. Astra-Bíró-Kert for sponsorship reasons, is a Hungarian women's football club from Budapest competing in the Hungarian 1st Division.

Founded as Íris SC, the team moved to Taksony in 2008 as Taksony SE but returned in 2011 to Budapest, taking its current name. Its best results to date are two third spots (1999, 2011) and a national cup's final (2004) lost to László Kórház SC.

== 2022–23 Squad ==
Note: Flags indicate national team as defined under FIFA eligibility rules; some limited exceptions apply. Players may hold more than one non-FIFA nationality.

No.	Pos.	Nation	Player
1	GK	HUN	Eszter Bocsárdi
27	GK	HUN	Erika Oláh
3	DF	HUN	Gabriella Pincze
4	DF	HUN	Mercédesz Merész
6	DF	HUN	Dorottya Mercz
13	DF	HUN	Judit Molnár
15	DF	HUN	Adrienn Kakuszi
18	DF	HUN	Krisztina Vidács
23	DF	HUN	Evelin Kancsár

No.	Pos.	Nation	Player
5	MF	HUN	Anita Szekér
7	MF	HUN	Ágnes Megyes
9	MF	HUN	Violetta Pintér
10	MF	HUN	Boglárka Szabó
17	MF	HUN	Mónika Benkő
19	MF	HUN	Kata Rebeka Jakab
8	FW	HUN	Katalin Godvár
25	FW	HUN	Katalin Fogl
