= Viktória FC-Szombathely =

Viktória FC
- Full name: Viktória Football Club Szombathely
- Founded: 1993
- Ground: Király Sportlétesítmény, Szombathely
- Capacity: 2,000
- Chairman: Csaba Barczi
- Manager: Csaba Mitterstiller
- League: Noi NB I
- 2025–26: 10th
- Website: http://www.viktoriafc.hu/
| Home colours | Away colours |

Viktória FC Szombathely, a.k.a. Viktoria-Trend Optika FC for sponsorship reasons, is a Hungarian women's football club from Szombathely, currently competing in Noi NB I. Founded in 1993, it became one of the leading Hungarian teams in the 2000s, winning two championships in 2004 and 2009, consequently appearing twice in the Champions League. In 2011 it won its third national cup.

== Titles ==
- 2 Hungarian Leagues (2004, 2009)
- 3 Hungarian Cups (2008, 2009, 2011)

== Record in UEFA competitions ==
| Season | Competition | Stage | Result | Opponent |
|---|---|---|---|---|
| 2004–05 | UEFA Women's Cup | Qualifying Stage | 4–0 | (Estonia) Pärnu |
| | | | 1–1 | (Moldova) Codru Anenii Noi |
| | | | 1–3 | (Belarus) Babruyshanka |
| 2009–10 | Champions League | Round of 32 | 0–5 2–4 | (Germany) Bayern Munich |

== Current squad ==
Note: Flags indicate national team as defined under FIFA eligibility rules; some limited exceptions apply. Players may hold more than one non-FIFA nationality.

| No. | Pos. | Nation | Player |
|---|---|---|---|
| 1 | GK | HUN | Petra Dömsödi |
| 2 | DF | HUN | Viktória Vörös |
| 3 | DF | HUN | Andrea Harsányi |
| 4 | FW | AUT | Heike Manhart |
| 5 | ? | HUN | Zsófia Kiss |
| 6 | DF | HUN | Adrienn Soós |
| 7 | FW | HUN | Daniella Grubits |
| 8 | FW | HUN | Lilla Horváth |
| 9 | FW | HUN | Barbara Kun |
| 10 | MF | HUN | Viktória Széles |
| 11 | DF | HUN | Enikő Tóth |

| No. | Pos. | Nation | Player |
|---|---|---|---|
| 12 | GK | HUN | Fanni Földes |
| 15 | MF | HUN | Alexandra Tóth |
| 17 | MF | HUN | Nikoletta Marsai |
| 18 | MF | HUN | Evelin Ferencsik |
| 19 | MF | HUN | Emese Szakonyi |
| 22 | FW | HUN | Dóra Nagy |
| 23 | DF | HUN | Fruzsina Tischler |
| 24 | MF | HUN | Klaudia Csidei |
| 96 | GK | HUN | Evelin Bogdányi |
