= 2018 Cyprus Women's Cup squads =

List of players competing at the 11th edition of the Cyprus Women's Cup

This article lists the squads for the 2018 Cyprus Women's Cup, the 11th edition of the Cyprus Women's Cup. The cup consisted of a series of friendly games, and was held in Cyprus from 28 February to 7 March 2018. The twelve national teams involved in the tournament registered a squad of 23 players.

The age listed for each player is on 28 February 2018, the first day of the tournament. The numbers of caps and goals listed for each player do not include any matches played after the start of tournament. The club listed is the club for which the player last played a competitive match prior to the tournament. The nationality for each club reflects the national association (not the league) to which the club is affiliated. A flag is included for coaches that are of a different nationality than their own national team.

== Group A ==
=== Finland ===
Coach: (Sweden) Anna Signeul

The squad was announced on 13 February 2018. Mimmi Nurmela was added to the squad on 20 February 2018. Linda Nyman replaced Tia Hälinen on 23 February 2018.

No.	Pos.	Player	Date of birth (age)	Club
	GK	Tinja-Riikka Korpela	5 May 1986 (aged 31)	(Norwegian Football Federation) Vålerenga
	GK	Minna Meriluoto	4 October 1985 (aged 32)	(Football Association of Finland) HJK
	GK	Kreeta-Liisa Yli-Säntti	3 January 1991 (aged 27)	(Swedish Football Association) LB07
	DF	Anna Auvinen	2 March 1987 (aged 30)	(Football Association of Finland) Honka
	DF	Tuija Hyyrynen	10 March 1988 (aged 29)	(Italian Football Federation) Juventus
	DF	Emma Koivisto	25 September 1994 (aged 23)	(Swedish Football Association) Kopparbergs/Göteborg
	DF	Katarina Naumanen	24 July 1995 (aged 22)	(Football Association of Finland) HJK
	DF	Mimmi Nurmela	3 August 1996 (aged 21)	(Football Association of Finland) PK-35 Vantaa
	DF	Tiia Peltonen	8 June 1995 (aged 22)	(Football Association of Finland) PK-35 Vantaa
	DF	Anna Westerlund	9 April 1989 (aged 28)	(Norwegian Football Federation) Lillestrøm
	MF	Olga Ahtinen	15 August 1997 (aged 20)	(Danish Football Association) Brøndby
	MF	Emmi Alanen	30 April 1991 (aged 26)	(Swedish Football Association) Vittsjö
	MF	Vilma Hakala	28 August 1996 (aged 21)	(Football Association of Finland) HJK
	MF	Nora Heroum	20 July 1994 (aged 23)	(Italian Football Federation) Brescia
	MF	Natalia Kuikka	1 December 1995 (aged 22)	(United States Soccer Federation) Florida State Seminoles
	MF	Linda Nyman	21 January 1994 (aged 24)	(Football Association of Finland) Honka
	MF	Ria Öling	15 September 1994 (aged 23)	(Danish Football Association) Brøndby
	MF	Julia Tunturi	25 April 1996 (aged 21)	(Swedish Football Association) Eskilstuna United
	FW	Kaisa Collin	16 April 1997 (aged 20)	(Football Association of Finland) PK-35 Vantaa
	FW	Adelina Engman	11 October 1994 (aged 23)	(Swedish Football Association) Kopparbergs/Göteborg
	FW	Sanni Franssi	19 March 1995 (aged 22)	(Italian Football Federation) Juventus
	FW	Juliette Kemppi	14 May 1994 (aged 23)	(Norwegian Football Federation) Lillestrøm
	FW	Linda Sällström	13 July 1988 (aged 29)	(Swedish Football Association) Vittsjö

=== Italy ===
Coach: Milena Bertolini

The squad was announced on 19 February 2018.

No.	Pos.	Player	Date of birth (age)	Caps	Goals	Club
	GK	Laura Giuliani	5 June 1993 (aged 24)	28	0	(Italian Football Federation) Juventus
	GK	Chiara Marchitelli	4 May 1985 (aged 32)	39	0	(Italian Football Federation) Brescia
	GK	Rosalia Pipitone	3 August 1985 (aged 32)	0	0	(Italian Football Federation) Res Roma
	DF	Elisa Bartoli	7 May 1991 (aged 26)	38	1	(Italian Football Federation) Fiorentina
	DF	Lisa Boattin	3 May 1997 (aged 20)	8	0	(Italian Football Federation) Juventus
	DF	Sara Gama	27 March 1989 (aged 28)	90	5	(Italian Football Federation) Juventus
	DF	Alia Guagni	1 October 1987 (aged 30)	56	5	(Italian Football Federation) Fiorentina
	DF	Elena Linari	15 April 1994 (aged 23)	37	0	(Italian Football Federation) Fiorentina
	DF	Cecilia Salvai	2 December 1993 (aged 24)	19	0	(Italian Football Federation) Juventus
	DF	Linda Tucceri Cimini	4 April 1991 (aged 26)	15	0	(Italian Football Federation) San Zaccaria
	MF	Greta Adami	30 July 1992 (aged 25)	1	0	(Italian Football Federation) Fiorentina
	MF	Valentina Bergamaschi	22 January 1997 (aged 21)	10	2	(Italian Football Federation) Brescia
	MF	Barbara Bonansea	13 July 1991 (aged 26)	41	16	(Italian Football Federation) Juventus
	MF	Aurora Galli	13 December 1996 (aged 21)	17	0	(Italian Football Federation) Juventus
	MF	Manuela Giugliano	18 August 1997 (aged 20)	12	2	(Italian Football Federation) Brescia
	MF	Benedetta Glionna	26 July 1999 (aged 18)	1	0	(Italian Football Federation) Juventus
	MF	Eleonora Goldoni	16 February 1996 (aged 22)	0	0	(United States Soccer Federation) East Tennessee State Buccaneers
	MF	Martina Rosucci	9 May 1992 (aged 25)	39	1	(Italian Football Federation) Juventus
	FW	Lisa Alborghetti	19 June 1993 (aged 24)	4	0	(Italian Football Federation) Atalanta Mozzanica
	FW	Valentina Giacinti	2 January 1994 (aged 24)	13	0	(Italian Football Federation) Brescia
	FW	Cristiana Girelli	23 April 1990 (aged 27)	44	22	(Italian Football Federation) Brescia
	FW	Ilaria Mauro	22 May 1988 (aged 29)	32	11	(Italian Football Federation) Fiorentina
	FW	Daniela Sabatino	26 June 1985 (aged 32)	39	20	(Italian Football Federation) Brescia

=== Switzerland ===
Coach: (Germany) Martina Voss-Tecklenburg

The squad was announced on 13 February 2018.

No.	Pos.	Player	Date of birth (age)	Club
	GK	Seraina Friedli	20 March 1993 (aged 24)	(Swiss Football Association) Zürich
	GK	Nicole Studer	22 February 1996 (aged 22)	(Swiss Football Association) Young Boys
	GK	Gaëlle Thalmann	18 January 1986 (aged 32)	(Italian Football Federation) Atalanta Mozzanica
	DF	Jana Brunner	20 January 1997 (aged 21)	(Swiss Football Association) Basel
	DF	Luana Bühler	28 April 1996 (aged 21)	(Swiss Football Association) Zürich
	DF	Francesca Calò	25 May 1995 (aged 22)	(Swiss Football Association) Young Boys
	DF	Thaïs Hurni	22 July 1998 (aged 19)	(Swiss Football Association) Young Boys
	DF	Rahel Kiwic	5 January 1991 (aged 27)	(German Football Association) Turbine Potsdam
	DF	Noelle Maritz	23 December 1995 (aged 22)	(German Football Association) VfL Wolfsburg
	DF	Rachel Rinast	2 June 1991 (aged 26)	(Swiss Football Association) Basel
	MF	Vanessa Bernauer	23 March 1988 (aged 29)	(German Football Association) VfL Wolfsburg
	MF	Viola Calligaris	17 March 1996 (aged 21)	(Royal Spanish Football Federation) Atlético Madrid
	MF	Lara Dickenmann	27 November 1985 (aged 32)	(German Football Association) VfL Wolfsburg
	MF	Florijana Ismaili	1 January 1995 (aged 23)	(Swiss Football Association) Young Boys
	FW	Eseosa Aigbogun	23 May 1993 (aged 24)	(German Football Association) Turbine Potsdam
	FW	Ramona Bachmann	25 December 1990 (aged 27)	(The Football Association) Chelsea
	FW	Ana-Maria Crnogorčević	3 October 1990 (aged 27)	(German Football Association) 1. FFC Frankfurt
	FW	Alisha Lehmann	21 January 1999 (aged 19)	(Swiss Football Association) Young Boys
	FW	Caroline Müller	18 May 1989 (aged 28)	(Swiss Football Association) Grasshopper
	FW	Melanie Müller	31 May 1996 (aged 21)	(Swiss Football Association) Young Boys
	FW	Géraldine Reuteler	21 April 1999 (aged 18)	(Swiss Football Association) Luzern

=== Wales ===
Coach: Jayne Ludlow

The squad was announced on 13 February 2018.

No.	Pos.	Player	Date of birth (age)	Club
	GK	Laura O'Sullivan	23 August 1991 (aged 26)	(Football Association of Wales) Cyncoed
	GK	Claire Skinner	17 February 1997 (aged 21)	(The Football Association) Oxford United
	DF	Loren Dykes	5 February 1988 (aged 30)	(The Football Association) Bristol City
	DF	Gemma Evans	1 August 1996 (aged 21)	(The Football Association) Yeovil Town
	DF	Sophie Ingle	2 September 1991 (aged 26)	(The Football Association) Liverpool
	DF	Hayley Ladd	6 October 1993 (aged 24)	(The Football Association) Birmingham City
	DF	Rhiannon Roberts	30 August 1990 (aged 27)	(The Football Association) Doncaster Rovers Belles
	DF	Amina Vine	19 March 2001 (aged 16)	(Football Association of Wales) Wales Performance Squad
	MF	Charlie Estcourt	27 May 1998 (aged 19)	(The Football Association) Bristol City
	MF	Jess Fishlock	14 January 1987 (aged 31)	(United States Soccer Federation) Seattle Reign
	MF	Alice Griffiths	22 January 2001 (aged 17)	(Football Association of Wales) Wales Performance Squad
	MF	Angharad James	1 June 1994 (aged 23)	(The Football Association) Everton
	MF	Hannah Miles	13 April 1998 (aged 19)	(The Football Association) Yeovil Town
	MF	Kylie Nolan	27 June 1998 (aged 19)	(The Football Association) Bristol City
	FW	Chloe Chivers	29 April 1999 (aged 18)	(The Football Association) Oxford United
	FW	Gwen Davies	12 May 1994 (aged 23)	(Football Association of Wales) Cyncoed
	FW	Melissa Fletcher	28 January 1992 (aged 26)	(The Football Association) Reading
	FW	Kayleigh Green	22 March 1988 (aged 29)	(The Football Association) Yeovil Town
	FW	Natasha Harding	2 March 1989 (aged 28)	(The Football Association) Reading
	FW	Elise Hughes	15 April 2001 (aged 16)	(The Football Association) Everton
	FW	Ellie Lake	5 March 1999 (aged 18)	(Football Association of Wales) Swansea City
	FW	Nadia Lawrence	29 November 1989 (aged 28)	(Football Association of Wales) Wales Performance Squad
	FW	Rachel Rowe	13 September 1992 (aged 25)	(The Football Association) Reading
	FW	Helen Ward	26 April 1986 (aged 31)	(The Football Association) Watford

== Group B ==
=== Austria ===
Coach: Dominik Thalhammer

The squad was announced on 14 February 2018.

No.	Pos.	Player	Date of birth (age)	Caps	Goals	Club
1	GK	Manuela Zinsberger	19 October 1995 (aged 22)	39	0	(German Football Association) Bayern Munich
2	DF	Marina Georgieva	13 April 1997 (aged 20)	1	0	(German Football Association) Turbine Potsdam
3	DF	Katharina Naschenweng	16 December 1997 (aged 20)	9	0	(Austrian Football Association) Sturm Graz
4	FW	Viktoria Pinther	16 October 1998 (aged 19)	13	0	(Austrian Football Association) St. Pölten
5	FW	Simona Koren	28 March 1993 (aged 24)	9	0	(The Football Association) Sunderland
6	DF	Katharina Schiechtl	27 February 1993 (aged 25)	32	4	(German Football Association) Werder Bremen
7	DF	Carina Wenninger	6 February 1991 (aged 27)	74	3	(German Football Association) Bayern Munich
8	MF	Nadine Prohaska	15 August 1990 (aged 27)	79	7	(Austrian Football Association) St. Pölten
9	FW	Sarah Zadrazil	19 February 1993 (aged 25)	53	7	(German Football Association) Turbine Potsdam
10	FW	Nina Burger	27 December 1987 (aged 30)	96	52	(German Football Association) SC Sand
11	MF	Katharina Aufhauser	6 January 1997 (aged 21)	0	0	(Royal Spanish Football Federation) Sporting de Huelva
12	FW	Stefanie Enzinger	20 November 1989 (aged 28)	10	1	(Austrian Football Association) St. Pölten
13	DF	Virginia Kirchberger	25 May 1993 (aged 24)	54	1	(German Football Association) MSV Duisburg
14	MF	Barbara Dunst	25 September 1997 (aged 20)	14	0	(German Football Association) MSV Duisburg
15	FW	Nicole Billa	5 March 1996 (aged 21)	39	13	(German Football Association) 1899 Hoffenheim
16	DF	Laura Wienroither	13 January 1999 (aged 19)	0	0	(Austrian Football Association) St. Pölten
17	MF	Sarah Puntigam	13 October 1992 (aged 25)	78	10	(German Football Association) SC Freiburg
18	MF	Laura Feiersinger	5 April 1993 (aged 24)	56	8	(German Football Association) SC Sand
19	DF	Verena Aschauer	20 January 1994 (aged 24)	52	6	(German Football Association) SC Sand
20	DF	Adina Hamidovic	26 April 1998 (aged 19)	0	0	(German Football Association) SC Sand
21	GK	Jasmin Pfeiler	28 July 1984 (aged 33)	20	0	(Austrian Football Association) Altenmarkt
22	MF	Jennifer Klein	11 January 1999 (aged 19)	1	0	(Austrian Football Association) Neulengbach
23	GK	Jasmin Pal	24 August 1996 (aged 21)	0	0	(Austrian Football Association) Wacker Innsbruck

=== Belgium ===
Coach: Ives Serneels

The squad was announced on 15 February 2018.

No.	Pos.	Player	Date of birth (age)	Club
1	GK	Justien Odeurs	30 May 1997 (aged 20)	(German Football Association) USV Jena
2	DF	Davina Philtjens	26 February 1989 (aged 29)	(Royal Dutch Football Association) Ajax
3	DF	Heleen Jaques	20 April 1988 (aged 29)	(Royal Belgian Football Association) Anderlecht
4	DF	Maud Coutereels	21 May 1986 (aged 31)	(French Football Federation) Lille
5	MF	Charlotte Tison	21 April 1998 (aged 19)	(Royal Belgian Football Association) Anderlecht
6	MF	Tine De Caigny	9 June 1997 (aged 20)	(Royal Belgian Football Association) Anderlecht
7	MF	Kassandra Missipo	3 February 1998 (aged 20)	(Royal Belgian Football Association) Gent
8	MF	Lenie Onzia	30 May 1989 (aged 28)	(Royal Belgian Football Association) Anderlecht
9	FW	Tessa Wullaert	19 March 1993 (aged 24)	(German Football Association) VfL Wolfsburg
10	DF	Aline Zeler (captain)	2 June 1983 (aged 34)	(Royal Belgian Football Association) Anderlecht
11	FW	Janice Cayman	12 October 1988 (aged 29)	(French Football Federation) Montpellier
12	GK	Diede Lemey	7 October 1996 (aged 21)	(Italian Football Federation) Verona
13	FW	Sarah Wijnants	13 October 1999 (aged 18)	(Royal Belgian Football Association) Anderlecht
14	FW	Davinia Vanmechelen	30 August 1999 (aged 18)	(French Football Federation) Paris Saint-Germain
15	FW	Yana Daniëls	8 May 1992 (aged 25)	(The Football Association) Bristol City
16	DF	Nicky Van Den Abbeele	21 February 1994 (aged 24)	(Royal Dutch Football Association) Ajax
17	FW	Jana Coryn	26 June 1992 (aged 25)	(French Football Federation) Lille
18	DF	Laura De Neve	9 October 1994 (aged 23)	(Royal Belgian Football Association) Anderlecht
19	FW	Jassina Blom	3 September 1994 (aged 23)	(Royal Dutch Football Association) Twente
20	MF	Justine Vanhaevermaet	29 April 1992 (aged 25)	(Royal Belgian Football Association) Anderlecht
21	GK	Nicky Evrard	26 May 1995 (aged 22)	(Royal Dutch Football Association) Twente
22	DF	Laura Deloose	18 June 1993 (aged 24)	(Royal Belgian Football Association) Anderlecht
23	FW	Celien Guns	18 June 1998 (aged 19)	(Royal Belgian Football Association) Oud-Heverlee Leuven
24	DF	Silke Vanwynsberghe	25 April 1997 (aged 20)	(Royal Belgian Football Association) Gent

=== Czech Republic ===
Coach: Karel Rada

The squad was announced on 13 February 2018. On 25 February 2018, Lucie Kladrubská replaced Petra Bertholdová.

No.	Pos.	Player	Date of birth (age)	Club
1	GK	Barbora Votíková	13 September 1996 (aged 21)	(Football Association of the Czech Republic) Slavia Prague
2	DF	Petra Vyštejnová	12 November 1990 (aged 27)	(Football Association of the Czech Republic) Sparta Prague
3	MF	Klára Cahynová	20 December 1993 (aged 24)	(German Football Association) Turbine Potsdam
4	MF	Lucie Kladrubská	30 June 1987 (aged 30)	(Football Association of the Czech Republic) Sparta Prague
5	MF	Eva Bartoňová	17 October 1993 (aged 24)	(Football Association of the Czech Republic) Slavia Prague
6	FW	Petra Divišová	5 June 1984 (aged 33)	(Football Association of the Czech Republic) Slavia Prague
7	MF	Tereza Krejčiříková	21 June 1996 (aged 21)	(Football Association of the Czech Republic) Slavia Prague
8	MF	Kateřina Svitková	20 March 1996 (aged 21)	(Football Association of the Czech Republic) Slavia Prague
9	FW	Tereza Szewieczková	4 May 1998 (aged 19)	(Football Association of the Czech Republic) Slavia Prague
10	FW	Lucie Voňková	28 February 1992 (aged 26)	(German Football Association) Bayern Munich
11	FW	Tereza Kožárová	18 October 1991 (aged 26)	(Football Association of the Czech Republic) Slavia Prague
12	GK	Alexandra Vaníčková	15 June 1997 (aged 20)	(Football Association of the Czech Republic) Viktoria Plzeň
13	MF	Antonie Stárová	12 October 1998 (aged 19)	(Football Association of the Czech Republic) Sparta Prague
14	DF	Aneta Dědinová	9 March 1994 (aged 23)	(Football Association of the Czech Republic) Slavia Prague
15	MF	Jitka Chlastáková	13 October 1993 (aged 24)	(Football Association of the Czech Republic) Slavia Prague
16	MF	Kateřina Bužková	19 March 1996 (aged 21)	(Football Association of the Czech Republic) Sparta Prague
17	FW	Pavlína Nepokojová	29 January 1989 (aged 29)	(Football Association of the Czech Republic) Sparta Prague
18	DF	Jana Sedláčková	21 January 1993 (aged 25)	(Football Association of the Czech Republic) Slavia Prague
	DF	Anna Dlasková	6 October 1995 (aged 22)	(Football Association of the Czech Republic) Sparta Prague
	DF	Nikola Sedláčková	6 September 1990 (aged 27)	(Football Association of the Czech Republic) Slavia Prague

=== Spain ===
Coach: Jorge Vilda

The squad was announced on 20 February 2018.

No.	Pos.	Player	Date of birth (age)	Caps	Goals	Club
1	GK	Lola Gallardo	10 June 1993 (aged 24)	23	0	(Royal Spanish Football Federation) Atlético Madrid
2	DF	Celia Jiménez	20 June 1995 (aged 22)	13	0	(United States Soccer Federation) Seattle Reign
3	DF	Andrea Pereira	19 September 1993 (aged 24)	16	0	(Royal Spanish Football Federation) Atlético Madrid
4	DF	Irene Paredes	4 July 1991 (aged 26)	52	7	(French Football Federation) Paris Saint-Germain
5	DF	Ivana Andrés	13 July 1994 (aged 23)	13	0	(Royal Spanish Football Federation) Valencia
6	MF	Virginia Torrecilla	4 September 1994 (aged 23)	42	5	(French Football Federation) Montpellier
7	MF	Marta Corredera	8 August 1991 (aged 26)	53	3	(Royal Spanish Football Federation) Atlético Madrid
8	DF	Marta Carro	6 January 1991 (aged 27)	3	0	(Royal Spanish Football Federation) Valencia
9	FW	Mari Paz Vilas	1 February 1988 (aged 30)	23	14	(Royal Spanish Football Federation) Valencia
10	FW	Jennifer Hermoso	9 May 1990 (aged 27)	55	21	(French Football Federation) Paris Saint-Germain
11	MF	Alexia Putellas	4 February 1994 (aged 24)	54	10	(Royal Spanish Football Federation) Barcelona
12	MF	Patricia Guijarro	17 May 1998 (aged 19)	9	3	(Royal Spanish Football Federation) Barcelona
13	GK	Sandra Paños	4 November 1992 (aged 25)	21	0	(Royal Spanish Football Federation) Barcelona
14	FW	Lucía García	14 July 1998 (aged 19)	3	0	(Royal Spanish Football Federation) Athletic Bilbao
15	MF	Gemma Gili	21 May 1994 (aged 23)	2	0	(Royal Spanish Football Federation) Barcelona
16	DF	Rocío Gálvez	15 May 1997 (aged 20)	2	0	(Royal Spanish Football Federation) Real Betis
17	MF	María Alharilla Casado	13 November 1990 (aged 27)	6	1	(Royal Spanish Football Federation) Levante
18	FW	Bárbara Latorre	14 March 1993 (aged 24)	17	1	(Royal Spanish Football Federation) Barcelona
19	MF	Amanda Sampedro	26 June 1993 (aged 24)	35	10	(Royal Spanish Football Federation) Atlético Madrid
20	FW	Olga García	1 June 1992 (aged 25)	23	4	(Royal Spanish Football Federation) Barcelona
21	MF	Sandra Hernández Rodríguez	25 May 1997 (aged 20)	4	0	(Royal Spanish Football Federation) Valencia
22	DF	Eunate Arraiza	3 June 1991 (aged 26)	4	0	(Royal Spanish Football Federation) Athletic Bilbao
23	GK	María Asunción Quiñones	29 October 1996 (aged 21)	1	0	(Royal Spanish Football Federation) Real Sociedad
24	MF	Aitana Bonmatí	18 January 1998 (aged 20)	3	0	(Royal Spanish Football Federation) Barcelona

== Group C ==
=== Hungary ===
Coach: Edina Markó

An initial 24-player squad was announced on 21 February 2018. A week later, on 28 February 2018, the final 23-player squad was announced, with Ágnes Nagy not travelling with the team to Cyprus.

No.	Pos.	Player	Date of birth (age)	Club
	GK	Barbara Bíró	11 May 1995 (aged 22)	(Hungarian Football Federation) Haladás-Viktória
	GK	Anna Samu	5 November 1996 (aged 21)	(Hungarian Football Federation) Ferencváros
	GK	Réka Szőcs	19 November 1989 (aged 28)	(Hungarian Football Federation) MTK Hungária
	DF	Boglárka Horti	1 July 1998 (aged 19)	(Hungarian Football Federation) Kóka FNLA
	DF	Evelin Mosdóczi	26 October 1994 (aged 23)	(Hungarian Football Federation) Ferencváros
	DF	Dóra Papp	5 January 1991 (aged 27)	(Hungarian Football Federation) MTK Hungária
	DF	Anita Pinczi	14 November 1993 (aged 24)	(Hungarian Football Federation) MTK Hungária
	DF	Viktória Szabó	26 May 1997 (aged 20)	(Hungarian Football Federation) Ferencváros
	DF	Szilvia Szeitl	26 April 1987 (aged 30)	(Hungarian Football Federation) Ferencváros
	DF	Szabina Tálosi	20 January 1989 (aged 29)	(Hungarian Football Federation) Haladás-Viktória
	DF	Alexandra Tóth	29 January 1991 (aged 27)	(Hungarian Football Federation) Haladás-Viktória
	DF	Lilla Turányi	20 December 1998 (aged 19)	(Hungarian Football Federation) MTK Hungária
	MF	Diána Csányi	20 March 1998 (aged 19)	(Hungarian Football Federation) MTK Hungária
	MF	Anna Csiki	14 November 1999 (aged 18)	(Hungarian Football Federation) Ferencváros
	MF	Henrietta Csiszár	15 May 1994 (aged 23)	(German Football Association) Bayer Leverkusen
	MF	Evelin Fenyvesi	7 November 1996 (aged 21)	(Hungarian Football Federation) Ferencváros
	MF	Petra Kocsán	4 June 1998 (aged 19)	(Hungarian Football Federation) Ferencváros
	MF	Zoé Magyarics	5 June 1998 (aged 19)	(Austrian Football Association) Südburgenland
	MF	Zsófia Rácz	28 December 1988 (aged 29)	(Royal Dutch Football Association) PSV
	FW	Zsanett Jakabfi	18 February 1990 (aged 28)	(German Football Association) VfL Wolfsburg
	FW	Loretta Németh	9 December 1995 (aged 22)	(Cyprus Football Association) Apollon Ladies
	FW	Fanny Vágó	23 July 1991 (aged 26)	(Austrian Football Association) St. Pölten
	FW	Bernadett Zágor	31 January 1990 (aged 28)	(Austrian Football Association) St. Pölten

=== North Korea ===
Coach: Kim Kwang-min

No.	Pos.	Player	Date of birth (age)	Club
	GK	Kim Myong-sun	6 March 1997 (aged 20)	
	GK	Paek Yong-hui	16 April 1990 (aged 27)	
	DF	Kim Nam-hui	4 March 1994 (aged 23)	(DPR Korea Football Association) April 25
	DF	Kim Un-ha	23 March 1993 (aged 24)	
	DF	Son Ok-ju	7 March 2000 (aged 17)	
	DF	Yu Jong-hui	21 March 1986 (aged 31)	(DPR Korea Football Association) April 25
	MF	Ju Hyo-sim	21 June 1998 (aged 19)	
	MF	Kim Jong-sim	26 September 1999 (aged 18)	
	MF	Kim Phyong-hwa	28 November 1996 (aged 21)	
	MF	Kim Un-hwa	28 August 1996 (aged 21)	
	MF	Kim Yun-mi (captain)	1 July 1993 (aged 24)	(DPR Korea Football Association) April 25
	MF	Ri Hyang-sim	23 March 1996 (aged 21)	
	MF	Ri Un-yong	1 September 1996 (aged 21)	
	MF	Yu Jong-im	6 December 1993 (aged 24)	
	FW	Ri Hae-yon	10 January 1999 (aged 19)	
	FW	Ri Kyong-hyang	10 June 1996 (aged 21)	
	FW	Sung Hyang-sim	2 December 1999 (aged 18)	(DPR Korea Football Association) Pyongyang City
	FW	Wi Jong-sim	13 October 1997 (aged 20)	(DPR Korea Football Association) Kalmaegi

=== Slovakia ===
Coach: Ivan Hucko

The squad was announced on 20 February 2018.

No.	Pos.	Player	Date of birth (age)	Club
	GK	Patrícia Chládeková	4 April 1997 (aged 20)	(German Football Association) 1. FC Saarbrücken
	GK	Lucia El-Dahaibiová	22 January 1989 (aged 29)	(Austrian Football Association) St. Pölten
	GK	Mária Korenčiová	27 April 1989 (aged 28)	(German Football Association) SC Freiburg
	DF	Patrícia Fischerová	26 August 1993 (aged 24)	(Polish Football Association) Czarni Sosnowiec
	DF	Lucia Haršányová	27 August 1990 (aged 27)	(German Football Association) MSV Duisburg
	DF	Stanislava Lišková	15 March 1997 (aged 20)	(Polish Football Association) Czarni Sosnowiec
	DF	Jana Vojteková	12 August 1991 (aged 26)	(German Football Association) SC Sand
	DF	Petra Zdechovanová	2 November 1995 (aged 22)	(Polish Football Association) Czarni Sosnowiec
	MF	Diana Bartovičová	20 May 1993 (aged 24)	(Football Association of the Czech Republic) Slavia Prague
	MF	Alexandra Bíróová	13 July 1991 (aged 26)	(Austrian Football Association) St. Pölten
	MF	Klaudia Fabová	12 September 1998 (aged 19)	(Football Association of the Czech Republic) Slovácko
	MF	Monika Havranová	4 April 1997 (aged 20)	(Slovak Football Association) Partizán Bardejov
	MF	Andrea Horváthová	5 October 1995 (aged 22)	(Polish Football Association) Czarni Sosnowiec
	MF	Kristína Košíková	20 December 1993 (aged 24)	(Football Association of the Czech Republic) Dukla Prague
	MF	Terézia Kovaľová	12 February 1998 (aged 20)	(Football Association of the Czech Republic) Slovan Liberec
	MF	Ľudmila Maťavková	11 April 1998 (aged 19)	(Football Association of the Czech Republic) Slovácko
	MF	Mária Mikolajová	13 June 1999 (aged 18)	(Slovak Football Association) Partizán Bardejov
	MF	Dominika Škorvánková	21 August 1991 (aged 26)	(German Football Association) Bayern Munich
	MF	Martina Šurnovská	10 February 1999 (aged 19)	(Slovak Football Association) Slovan Bratislava
	MF	Lucia Šušková	27 March 1993 (aged 24)	(Polish Football Association) Czarni Sosnowiec
	MF	Valentína Šušolová	1 November 1995 (aged 22)	(Football Association of the Czech Republic) Slovan Liberec
	FW	Patrícia Hmírová	30 November 1993 (aged 24)	(Polish Football Association) Czarni Sosnowiec

=== South Africa ===
Coach: Desiree Ellis

The squad was announced on 2 February 2018. On 25 February 2018, Kholosa Biyana withdrew and was replaced by Zanele Nhlapo.

No.	Pos.	Player	Date of birth (age)	Club
1	GK	Roxanne Barker	6 May 1991 (aged 26)	(South African Football Association) Cape Town Roses
2	DF	Lebogang Ramalepe	3 December 1991 (aged 26)	(South African Football Association) Ma-Indies
3	DF	Nothando Vilakazi	28 October 1988 (aged 29)	(South African Football Association) Palace Super Falcons
4	DF	Noko Matlou	30 September 1985 (aged 32)	(South African Football Association) Ma-Indies
5	DF	Janine van Wyk (captain)	17 April 1987 (aged 30)	(United States Soccer Federation) Houston Dash
6	MF	Kgaelebane Mohlakoana	10 December 1993 (aged 24)	(South African Football Association) Bloemfontein Celtic
7	DF	Regina Mogolola	11 April 1993 (aged 24)	(South African Football Association) Tuks
8	FW	Chantelle Esau	14 December 1990 (aged 27)	(South African Football Association) Mamelodi Sundowns
9	FW	Sduduzo Dlamini	7 April 1995 (aged 22)	(South African Football Association) Sunflower
10	MF	Linda Motlhalo	1 July 1998 (aged 19)	(United States Soccer Federation) Houston Dash
11	MF	Thembi Kgatlana	2 May 1996 (aged 21)	(South African Football Association) University of the Western Cape
12	FW	Jermaine Seoposenwe	12 October 1993 (aged 24)	(United States Soccer Federation) Samford Bulldogs
13	DF	Bambanani Mbane	12 March 1990 (aged 27)	(South African Football Association) Bloemfontein Celtic
14	MF	Zanele Nhlapo	24 June 1991 (aged 26)	(South African Football Association) Mamelodi Sundowns
15	MF	Refiloe Jane	4 August 1992 (aged 25)	(South African Football Association) TUT-PTA
16	GK	Andile Dlamini	2 September 1992 (aged 25)	(South African Football Association) Mamelodi Sundowns
17	MF	Leandra Smeda	22 July 1989 (aged 28)	(South African Football Association) University of the Western Cape
18	MF	Nompumelelo Nyandeni	19 August 1987 (aged 30)	(South African Football Association) JVW
19	FW	Melinda Kgadiete	21 July 1992 (aged 25)	(South African Football Association) Bloemfontein Celtic
20	MF	Rachel Sebati	3 February 1993 (aged 25)	(South African Football Association) TUT-PTA
21	GK	Kaylin Swart	30 September 1994 (aged 23)	(United States Soccer Federation) Menlo Oaks

== Player representation ==
=== By club ===
Clubs with 5 or more players represented are listed.

Players	Club
12	(Czech Republic) Slavia Prague
10	(Italy) Juventus
9	(Belgium) Anderlecht
8	(Austria) St. Pölten
7	(Hungary) Ferencváros, (Italy) Brescia, (Spain) Barcelona
6	(Czech Republic) Sparta Prague, (Poland) Czarni Sosnowiec, (Switzerland) Young Boys
5	(Germany) SC Sand, (Germany) Turbine Potsdam, (Germany) Wolfsburg, (Hungary) MTK Hungária, (Italy) Fiorentina, (Spain) Atlético Madrid

=== By club nationality ===
Players	Clubs
30	Germany
27	Italy
24	Czech Republic
22	Spain
20	England
17	South Africa
16	Hungary
13	Austria
12	Belgium, Switzerland
8	Finland, United States
7	France
6	Poland, Sweden, Wales
5	Netherlands, North Korea
3	Norway, Slovakia
2	Denmark
1	Cyprus

=== By club federation ===
Players	Federation
223	UEFA
17	CAF
8	CONCACAF
5	AFC

=== By representatives of domestic league ===
National squad	Players
Italy	22
Spain	20
Czech Republic	18
South Africa	17
Hungary	16
Belgium	12
Switzerland	12
Austria	8
Finland	8
Wales	6
North Korea	5
Slovakia	3
