= 2017 Cyprus Women's Cup squads =

List of players competing at the 10th edition of the Cyprus Women's Cup

This article lists the squads for the 2017 Cyprus Women's Cup, the 10th edition of the Cyprus Women's Cup. The cup consisted of a series of friendly games, and was held in Cyprus from 1 to 8 March 2017. The twelve national teams involved in the tournament registered a squad of 23 players.

The age listed for each player is on 1 March 2017, the first day of the tournament. The numbers of caps and goals listed for each player do not include any matches played after the start of tournament. The club listed is the club for which the player last played a competitive match prior to the tournament. The nationality for each club reflects the national association (not the league) to which the club is affiliated. A flag is included for coaches that are of a different nationality than their own national team.

== Group A ==
=== Belgium ===
Coach: Ives Serneels

The squad was announced on 15 February 2017. On 27 February 2017, Sarah Wijnants replaced Laura De Neve due to a muscle tear suffered during a club match. Diede Lemey was replaced by Lisa Lichtfus after the competition's second match, due to school obligations.

No.	Pos.	Player	Date of birth (age)	Club
1	GK	Nicky Evrard	26 May 1995 (aged 21)	(Royal Belgian Football Association) Gent
2	DF	Davina Philtjens	26 February 1989 (aged 28)	(Royal Dutch Football Association) Ajax
3	DF	Heleen Jaques	20 April 1988 (aged 28)	(Royal Belgian Football Association) Anderlecht
4	DF	Maud Coutereels	21 May 1986 (aged 30)	(French Football Federation) Lille
5	DF	Lorca Van De Putte	3 April 1988 (aged 28)	(Swedish Football Association) Kristianstads
6	DF	Tine De Caigny	9 June 1997 (aged 19)	(Royal Belgian Football Association) Anderlecht
7	FW	Jassina Blom	3 September 1994 (aged 22)	(Royal Dutch Football Association) Heerenveen
8	MF	Lenie Onzia	30 May 1989 (aged 27)	(Royal Dutch Football Association) Twente
9	FW	Tessa Wullaert	19 March 1993 (aged 23)	(German Football Association) VfL Wolfsburg
10	FW	Aline Zeler (captain)	2 June 1983 (aged 33)	(Royal Belgian Football Association) Standard Liège
11	MF	Janice Cayman	12 October 1988 (aged 28)	(French Football Federation) Montpellier
12	GK	Diede Lemey	7 October 1996 (aged 20)	(Royal Belgian Football Association) Anderlecht
12	GK	Lisa Lichtfus	29 December 1999 (aged 17)	(Royal Belgian Football Association) Standard Liège
13	MF	Sara Yuceil	22 June 1988 (aged 28)	(French Football Federation) Marseille
14	FW	Lien Mermans	27 September 1990 (aged 26)	(Royal Belgian Football Association) Lierse
15	FW	Tine Schryvers	11 March 1993 (aged 23)	(Swedish Football Association) Kristianstads
16	MF	Nicky Van Den Abbeele	21 February 1994 (aged 23)	(Royal Belgian Football Association) Anderlecht
17	FW	Jana Coryn	26 June 1992 (aged 24)	(French Football Federation) Lille
18	FW	Sarah Wijnants	13 October 1999 (aged 17)	(Royal Belgian Football Association) Standard Liège
19	DF	Imke Courtois	14 March 1988 (aged 28)	(Royal Belgian Football Association) Standard Liège
20	FW	Justine Vanhaevermaet	29 April 1992 (aged 24)	(Royal Belgian Football Association) Anderlecht
21	GK	Sofie Van Houtven	3 August 1987 (aged 29)	(Royal Belgian Football Association) Genk
22	DF	Laura Deloose	18 June 1993 (aged 23)	(Royal Belgian Football Association) Anderlecht
23	DF	Elien Van Wynendaele	19 February 1995 (aged 22)	(Royal Belgian Football Association) Gent
24	FW	Davinia Vanmechelen	30 August 1999 (aged 17)	(Royal Belgian Football Association) Standard Liège

=== Italy ===
Coach: Antonio Cabrini

The squad was announced on 20 February 2017.

No.	Pos.	Player	Date of birth (age)	Club
1	GK	Alessia Gritti	24 April 1987 (aged 29)	(Italian Football Federation) Mozzanica
2	DF	Lisa Boattin	3 May 1997 (aged 19)	(Italian Football Federation) Verona
3	DF	Sara Gama	27 March 1989 (aged 27)	(Italian Football Federation) Brescia
4	MF	Daniela Stracchi	2 September 1983 (aged 33)	(Italian Football Federation) Mozzanica
5	DF	Elena Linari	15 April 1994 (aged 22)	(Italian Football Federation) Fiorentina
6	DF	Federica Di Criscio	12 May 1993 (aged 23)	(Italian Football Federation) Verona
7	MF	Alia Guagni	1 October 1987 (aged 29)	(Italian Football Federation) Fiorentina
8	FW	Melania Gabbiadini	28 August 1983 (aged 33)	(Italian Football Federation) Verona
9	FW	Daniela Sabatino	26 June 1985 (aged 31)	(Italian Football Federation) Brescia
10	MF	Alice Parisi	11 December 1990 (aged 26)	(Italian Football Federation) Fiorentina
11	MF	Barbara Bonansea	13 June 1991 (aged 25)	(Italian Football Federation) Brescia
12	GK	Sabrina Tasselli	3 April 1990 (aged 26)	(Italian Football Federation) Sassuolo
13	FW	Manuela Giugliano	18 August 1997 (aged 19)	(Italian Football Federation) Verona
14	MF	Valery Vigilucci	15 April 1997 (aged 19)	(Italian Football Federation) Fiorentina
15	DF	Eleonora Piacezzi	9 November 1995 (aged 21)	(Italian Football Federation) Cuneo
16	MF	Valentina Bergamaschi	22 January 1997 (aged 20)	(Swiss Football Association) Neunkirch
17	DF	Giorgia Spinelli	12 December 1994 (aged 22)	(Italian Football Federation) Inter Milan
18	DF	Linda Tucceri Cimini	4 April 1991 (aged 25)	(Italian Football Federation) San Zaccaria
19	MF	Aurora Galli	13 December 1996 (aged 20)	(Italian Football Federation) Verona
20	MF	Valentina Cernoia	22 June 1991 (aged 25)	(Italian Football Federation) Brescia
21	MF	Marta Carissimi	3 May 1987 (aged 29)	(Italian Football Federation) Fiorentina
22	GK	Chiara Serafino	3 December 1989 (aged 27)	(Italian Football Federation) Luserna
23	FW	Cristiana Girelli	23 April 1990 (aged 26)	(Italian Football Federation) Brescia

=== North Korea ===
Coach: Kim Kwang-min

No.	Pos.	Player	Date of birth (age)	Club
1	GK	Ra Sol-ju	13 January 1994 (aged 23)	
2	DF	Kim Nam-hui	4 March 1994 (aged 22)	
3	DF	Jo Jong-sim	23 June 1993 (aged 23)	
4	MF	Ro Un-byol		
5	MF	Jang Suk-yong	1 August 1999 (aged 17)	
6	MF	Ju Hyo-sim	21 June 1998 (aged 18)	
7	MF	Choe Kum-ok	23 February 2002 (aged 15)	
8	FW	Wi Jong-sim	13 October 1997 (aged 19)	
10	DF	Ho Un-byol (captain)	19 January 1992 (aged 25)	
11	MF	Kim Phyong-hwa	28 November 1996 (aged 20)	
12	MF	Kim Yun-mi	1 July 1993 (aged 23)	
13	FW	Ri Kyong-hyang	10 June 1996 (aged 20)	
14	MF	Ri Hyang-sim	23 March 1996 (aged 20)	
15	MF	Ri Un-jong	6 November 1999 (aged 17)	
16	DF	Kim Un-ha	23 March 1993 (aged 23)	
17	DF	Son Ok-ju	7 March 2000 (aged 16)	
18	GK	Kim Myong-sun	6 March 1997 (aged 19)	
19	MF	Pang Un-sim	29 June 2001 (aged 15)	
20	FW	Kim Ryu-song	26 February 2002 (aged 15)	
21	GK	Rim Yong-hwa	20 January 1996 (aged 21)	
22	DF	Choe Ok-chol	11 November 1998 (aged 18)	

=== Switzerland ===
Coach: (Germany) Martina Voss-Tecklenburg

The squad was announced on 9 February 2017. Vanessa Bürki replaced Meriame Terchoun before the beginning of the competition.

No.	Pos.	Player	Date of birth (age)	Club
1	GK	Gaëlle Thalmann	18 January 1986 (aged 31)	(Italian Football Federation) Verona
2	DF	Jana Brunner	20 January 1997 (aged 20)	(Swiss Football Association) Basel
3	MF	Naomi Mégroz	6 August 1998 (aged 18)	(Swiss Football Association) Zürich
4	DF	Rachel Rinast	2 June 1991 (aged 25)	(German Football Association) Bayer Leverkusen
5	DF	Noelle Maritz	23 December 1995 (aged 21)	(German Football Association) VfL Wolfsburg
6	DF	Selina Kuster	8 August 1991 (aged 25)	(Swiss Football Association) Zürich
7	MF	Martina Moser	9 April 1986 (aged 30)	(German Football Association) 1899 Hoffenheim
8	MF	Cinzia Zehnder	4 August 1997 (aged 19)	(German Football Association) SC Freiburg
9	MF	Lia Wälti	19 April 1993 (aged 23)	(German Football Association) Turbine Potsdam
10	FW	Ramona Bachmann	25 December 1990 (aged 26)	(The Football Association) Chelsea
11	MF	Lara Dickenmann	27 November 1985 (aged 31)	(German Football Association) VfL Wolfsburg
12	GK	Stenia Michel	23 October 1987 (aged 29)	(Swiss Football Association) Basel
13	FW	Ana-Maria Crnogorčević	3 October 1990 (aged 26)	(German Football Association) 1. FFC Frankfurt
14	DF	Rahel Kiwic	5 January 1991 (aged 26)	(German Football Association) MSV Duisburg
15	DF	Caroline Abbé (captain)	13 January 1988 (aged 29)	(German Football Association) Bayern Munich
16	FW	Fabienne Humm	20 December 1986 (aged 30)	(Swiss Football Association) Zürich
17	FW	Florijana Ismaili	1 January 1995 (aged 22)	(Swiss Football Association) Young Boys
18	MF	Viola Calligaris	17 March 1996 (aged 20)	(Swiss Football Association) Young Boys
19	FW	Eseosa Aigbogun	23 May 1993 (aged 23)	(German Football Association) Turbine Potsdam
20	MF	Sandrine Mauron	19 December 1996 (aged 20)	(Swiss Football Association) Zürich
21	GK	Seraina Friedli	20 March 1993 (aged 23)	(Swiss Football Association) Zürich
22	MF	Vanessa Bernauer	23 March 1988 (aged 28)	(German Football Association) VfL Wolfsburg
23	FW	Vanessa Bürki	1 April 1986 (aged 30)	(German Football Association) Bayern Munich
24	FW	Géraldine Reuteler	21 April 1999 (aged 17)	(Swiss Football Association) Luzern

== Group B ==
=== Austria ===
Coach: Dominik Thalhammer

The squad was announced on 14 February 2017.

No.	Pos.	Player	Date of birth (age)	Club
	GK	Isabella Kresche	28 November 1998 (aged 18)	(Austrian Football Association) St. Pölten
	GK	Anna-Carina Kristler	17 July 1988 (aged 28)	(Austrian Football Association) Sturm Graz
	GK	Manuela Zinsberger	19 October 1995 (aged 21)	(German Football Association) Bayern Munich
	DF	Marina Georgieva	13 April 1997 (aged 19)	(German Football Association) Turbine Potsdam
	DF	Virginia Kirchberger	25 May 1993 (aged 23)	(German Football Association) MSV Duisburg
	DF	Sophie Maierhofer	9 August 1996 (aged 20)	(United States Soccer Federation) Kansas Jayhawks
	DF	Katharina Naschenweng	16 December 1997 (aged 19)	(Austrian Football Association) Sturm Graz
	DF	Katharina Schiechtl	27 February 1993 (aged 24)	(German Football Association) Werder Bremen
	DF	Carina Wenninger	6 February 1991 (aged 26)	(German Football Association) Bayern Munich
	MF	Verena Aschauer	20 January 1994 (aged 23)	(German Football Association) SC Sand
	MF	Barbara Dunst	25 September 1997 (aged 19)	(German Football Association) Bayer Leverkusen
	MF	Jasmin Eder	8 October 1992 (aged 24)	(Austrian Football Association) St. Pölten
	MF	Nadine Prohaska	15 August 1990 (aged 26)	(Austrian Football Association) St. Pölten
	MF	Sarah Puntigam	13 October 1992 (aged 24)	(German Football Association) SC Freiburg
	MF	Laura Wienroither	13 January 1999 (aged 18)	(Austrian Football Association) Neulengbach
	MF	Sarah Zadrazil	19 February 1993 (aged 24)	(German Football Association) Turbine Potsdam
	FW	Nicole Billa	5 March 1996 (aged 20)	(German Football Association) 1899 Hoffenheim
	FW	Nina Burger	27 December 1987 (aged 29)	(German Football Association) SC Sand
	FW	Stefanie Enzinger	25 November 1990 (aged 26)	(Austrian Football Association) Sturm Graz
	FW	Laura Feiersinger	5 April 1993 (aged 23)	(German Football Association) SC Sand
	FW	Annelie Leitner	15 June 1996 (aged 20)	(United States Soccer Federation) Indiana Hoosiers
	FW	Lisa Makas	11 May 1992 (aged 24)	(German Football Association) MSV Duisburg
	FW	Viktoria Pinther	16 October 1998 (aged 18)	(Austrian Football Association) St. Pölten

=== New Zealand ===
Coach: (England) Tony Readings

The squad was announced on 11 February 2017.

No.	Pos.	Player	Date of birth (age)	Caps	Goals	Club
	GK	Anna Leat	26 June 2001 (aged 15)	0	0	(New Zealand Football) East Coast Bays
	GK	Erin Nayler	17 April 1992 (aged 24)	44	0	(French Football Federation) Grenoble
	DF	C. J. Bott	22 April 1995 (aged 21)	3	0	(New Zealand Football) Forrest Hill Milford United
	DF	Abby Erceg (captain)	20 November 1989 (aged 27)	130	6	(United States Soccer Federation) North Carolina Courage
	DF	Anna Green	20 August 1990 (aged 26)	61	7	(The Football Association) Reading
	DF	Meikayla Moore	4 June 1996 (aged 20)	16	0	(New Zealand Football) Cashmere Technical
	DF	Ria Percival	7 December 1989 (aged 27)	120	11	(Swiss Football Association) Basel
	DF	Ali Riley	30 October 1987 (aged 29)	105	1	(Swedish Football Association) Rosengård
	DF	Rebekah Stott	17 June 1993 (aged 23)	53	4	(Football Australia) Melbourne City
	MF	Katie Bowen	15 April 1994 (aged 22)	41	1	(United States Soccer Federation) Kansas City
	MF	Daisy Cleverley	30 April 1997 (aged 19)	3	2	(United States Soccer Federation) California Golden Bears
	MF	Betsy Hassett	4 August 1990 (aged 26)	95	8	(Royal Dutch Football Association) Ajax
	MF	Annalie Longo	1 July 1991 (aged 25)	95	9	(New Zealand Football) Cashmere Technical
	MF	Malia Steinmetz	18 January 1999 (aged 18)	0	0	(New Zealand Football) Forrest Hill Milford United
	MF	Kirsty Yallop	4 November 1986 (aged 30)	101	12	(Football Australia) Melbourne Victory
	FW	Amber Hearn	28 November 1984 (aged 32)	116	52	(German Football Association) USV Jena
	FW	Jasmine Pereira	20 July 1996 (aged 20)	21	0	(New Zealand Football) Three Kings United
	FW	Aimee Phillips	6 May 1991 (aged 25)	3	1	(New Zealand Football) Eastern Suburbs
	FW	Martine Puketapu	16 September 1997 (aged 19)	0	0	(United States Soccer Federation) Colorado Buffaloes
	FW	Paige Satchell	13 April 1998 (aged 18)	1	0	(New Zealand Football) Three Kings United
	FW	Rosie White	6 June 1993 (aged 23)	84	14	(United States Soccer Federation) Boston Breakers
	FW	Hannah Wilkinson	28 May 1992 (aged 24)	78	24	(United States Soccer Federation) Tennessee Volunteers

=== Scotland ===
Coach: (Sweden) Anna Signeul

The squad was announced on 14 February 2017.

No.	Pos.	Player	Date of birth (age)	Caps	Goals	Club
	GK	Shannon Lynn	22 October 1985 (aged 31)	19	0	(Swedish Football Association) Vittsjö
	GK	Lee Alexander	23 September 1991 (aged 25)	0	0	(Scottish Football Association) Glasgow City
	DF	Jen Beattie	13 May 1991 (aged 25)	104	22	(The Football Association) Manchester City
	DF	Frankie Brown	8 October 1987 (aged 29)	79	0	(The Football Association) Bristol City
	DF	Rachel Corsie	17 August 1989 (aged 27)	87	16	(United States Soccer Federation) Seattle Reign
	DF	Ifeoma Dieke	25 February 1981 (aged 36)	114	0	(Swedish Football Association) Vittsjö
	DF	Emma Mitchell	19 September 1992 (aged 24)	49	7	(The Football Association) Arsenal
	DF	Joelle Murray	7 November 1986 (aged 30)	38	1	(Scottish Football Association) Hibernian
	MF	Leanne Crichton	6 August 1987 (aged 29)	44	3	(The Football Association) Notts County
	MF	Erin Cuthbert	19 July 1998 (aged 18)	4	1	(The Football Association) Chelsea
	MF	Lisa Evans	21 May 1992 (aged 24)	53	12	(German Football Association) Bayern Munich
	MF	Hayley Lauder	4 June 1990 (aged 26)	80	9	(Scottish Football Association) Glasgow City
	MF	Kim Little	29 June 1990 (aged 26)	119	47	(The Football Association) Arsenal
	MF	Joanne Love	6 December 1985 (aged 31)	173	13	(Scottish Football Association) Glasgow City
	MF	Christie Murray	3 May 1990 (aged 26)	42	3	(The Football Association) Doncaster Rovers Belles
	MF	Leanne Ross	8 July 1981 (aged 35)	126	8	(Scottish Football Association) Glasgow City
	MF	Caroline Weir	20 June 1995 (aged 21)	31	5	(The Football Association) Liverpool
	FW	Lizzie Arnot	1 March 1996 (aged 21)	8	0	(Scottish Football Association) Hibernian
	FW	Fiona Brown	31 March 1995 (aged 21)	11	0	(Swedish Football Association) Eskilstuna United
	FW	Lana Clelland	26 January 1993 (aged 24)	12	1	(Italian Football Federation) Tavagnacco
	FW	Jane Ross	18 September 1989 (aged 27)	98	47	(The Football Association) Manchester City

=== South Korea ===
Coach: Yoon Deok-yeo

The squad was announced on 3 February 2017.

No.	Pos.	Player	Date of birth (age)	Club
1	GK	Kang Ga-ae	10 December 1990 (aged 26)	(Korea Football Association) Gumi Sportstoto
2	DF	Hong Hye-ji	25 August 1996 (aged 20)	(Japan Football Association) INAC Kobe Leonessa
3	DF	Lim Seon-joo	27 November 1990 (aged 26)	(Korea Football Association) Incheon Hyundai Steel Red Angels
4	MF	Jang Sel-gi	31 May 1994 (aged 22)	(Korea Football Association) Incheon Hyundai Steel Red Angels
5	DF	Kim Hye-ri	25 June 1990 (aged 26)	(Korea Football Association) Incheon Hyundai Steel Red Angels
6	DF	Shin Dam-yeong	2 October 1993 (aged 23)	(Korea Football Association) Suwon UDC
7	FW	Ji So-yun	21 February 1991 (aged 26)	(The Football Association) Chelsea
8	MF	Kang Yu-mi	5 October 1991 (aged 25)	(Korea Football Association) Hwacheon KSPO
9	FW	Yoo Young-a	15 April 1988 (aged 28)	(Korea Football Association) Gumi Sportstoto
10	MF	Lee Min-a	8 November 1991 (aged 25)	(Korea Football Association) Incheon Hyundai Steel Red Angels
11	MF	Moon Mi-ra	28 February 1992 (aged 25)	(Korea Football Association) Icheon Daekyo
12	MF	Kwon Eun-som	13 November 1990 (aged 26)	(Korea Football Association) Icheon Daekyo
13	FW	Lee Geum-min	7 April 1994 (aged 22)	(Korea Football Association) Seoul City
14	MF	Choe Yu-ri	16 September 1994 (aged 22)	Unattached
15	MF	Cho So-hyun (captain)	24 June 1988 (aged 28)	(Korea Football Association) Incheon Hyundai Steel Red Angels
16	FW	Jung Seol-bin	6 January 1990 (aged 27)	(Korea Football Association) Incheon Hyundai Steel Red Angels
17	DF	Kim Soo-yun	30 August 1989 (aged 27)	(Korea Football Association) Suwon UDC
18	GK	Kim Jung-mi	16 October 1984 (aged 32)	(Korea Football Association) Incheon Hyundai Steel Red Angels
19	DF	Lee Eun-mi	18 August 1988 (aged 28)	(Korea Football Association) Suwon UDC
20	MF	Lee So-dam	12 October 1994 (aged 22)	(Korea Football Association) Gumi Sportstoto
21	DF	Kim Do-yeon	7 December 1988 (aged 28)	(Korea Football Association) Incheon Hyundai Steel Red Angels
22	DF	Shim Seo-yeon	15 April 1989 (aged 27)	(Korea Football Association) Icheon Daekyo
23	GK	Min Yoo-kyung	9 June 1995 (aged 21)	(Korea Football Association) Suwon UDC

== Group C ==
=== Czech Republic ===
Coach: Karel Brückner

The squad was announced on 10 February 2017.

No.	Pos.	Player	Date of birth (age)	Caps	Goals	Club
	GK	Radka Bednaříková	18 December 1990 (aged 26)	17	0	(Football Association of the Czech Republic) Slovácko
	GK	Barbora Votíková	13 September 1996 (aged 20)	4	0	(Football Association of the Czech Republic) Slavia Prague
	DF	Petra Bertholdová	24 November 1984 (aged 32)	56	2	(Football Association of the Czech Republic) Sparta Prague
	DF	Kristýna Janků	18 July 1994 (aged 22)	11	0	(Football Association of the Czech Republic) Slovácko
	DF	Veronika Pincová	15 November 1989 (aged 27)	35	4	(Football Association of the Czech Republic) Slavia Prague
	DF	Jana Sedláčková	21 January 1993 (aged 24)	32	2	(German Football Association) USV Jena
	DF	Nikola Sedláčková	6 September 1990 (aged 26)	19	0	(Football Association of the Czech Republic) Slovácko
	DF	Petra Vyštejnová	12 November 1990 (aged 26)	50	0	(Football Association of the Czech Republic) Sparta Prague
	MF	Eva Bartoňová	17 October 1993 (aged 23)	33	2	(Football Association of the Czech Republic) Slavia Prague
	MF	Klára Cahynová	20 December 1993 (aged 23)	37	3	(Football Association of the Czech Republic) Slavia Prague
	MF	Jitka Chlastáková	13 October 1993 (aged 23)	26	4	(Football Association of the Czech Republic) Slavia Prague
	MF	Lucie Kladrubská	30 June 1987 (aged 29)	19	2	(Football Association of the Czech Republic) Sparta Prague
	MF	Tereza Krejčiříková	21 June 1996 (aged 20)	10	2	(Football Association of the Czech Republic) Slavia Prague
	MF	Vendula Strnadová	20 November 1989 (aged 27)	3	0	(Football Association of the Czech Republic) Slovácko
	MF	Kateřina Svitková	20 March 1996 (aged 20)	16	8	(Football Association of the Czech Republic) Slavia Prague
	FW	Petra Divišová	5 June 1984 (aged 32)	37	13	(Football Association of the Czech Republic) Slavia Prague
	FW	Tereza Kožárová	18 October 1991 (aged 25)	27	2	(Football Association of the Czech Republic) Slavia Prague
	FW	Lucie Martínková	19 September 1986 (aged 30)	74	16	(Football Association of the Czech Republic) Sparta Prague
	FW	Pavlína Nepokojová	29 January 1989 (aged 28)	9	1	(Football Association of the Czech Republic) Sparta Prague
	FW	Lucie Voňková	28 February 1992 (aged 25)	36	9	(German Football Association) USV Jena

=== Hungary ===
Coach: Edina Markó

The squad was announced on 27 February 2017.

No.	Pos.	Player	Date of birth (age)	Club
	GK	Barbara Bíró	11 May 1995 (aged 21)	(Hungarian Football Federation) Viktória
	GK	Anna Samu	5 November 1996 (aged 20)	(Hungarian Football Federation) Ferencváros
	GK	Réka Szőcs	19 November 1989 (aged 27)	(Hungarian Football Federation) MTK Hungária
	DF	Réka Demeter	26 September 1991 (aged 25)	(Hungarian Football Federation) MTK Hungária
	DF	Evelin Mosdóczi	26 October 1994 (aged 22)	(Hungarian Football Federation) Ferencváros
	DF	Dóra Papp	5 January 1991 (aged 26)	(Hungarian Football Federation) MTK Hungária
	DF	Anita Pinczi	14 November 1993 (aged 23)	(Hungarian Football Federation) MTK Hungária
	DF	Viktória Szabó	26 May 1997 (aged 19)	(German Football Association) 1. FC Saarbrücken
	DF	Szilvia Szeitl	26 April 1987 (aged 29)	(Hungarian Football Federation) Ferencváros
	DF	Szabina Tálosi	20 January 1989 (aged 28)	(Hungarian Football Federation) Viktória
	DF	Alexandra Tóth	29 January 1991 (aged 26)	(Hungarian Football Federation) Viktória
	DF	Gabriella Tóth	16 December 1986 (aged 30)	(German Football Association) Werder Bremen
	MF	Henrietta Csiszár	15 May 1994 (aged 22)	(German Football Association) Bayer Leverkusen
	MF	Edina Farádi-Szabó	22 June 1997 (aged 19)	(Hungarian Football Federation) MTK Hungária
	MF	Evelin Fenyvesi	7 November 1996 (aged 20)	(Hungarian Football Federation) Ferencváros
	MF	Zoé Magyarics	5 June 1998 (aged 18)	(Hungarian Football Federation) Viktória
	MF	Ágnes Nagy	27 July 1992 (aged 24)	(Hungarian Football Federation) Ferencváros
	MF	Lilla Nagy	18 December 1989 (aged 27)	(Hungarian Football Federation) MTK Hungária
	MF	Zsófia Rácz	28 December 1988 (aged 28)	(German Football Association) MSV Duisburg
	FW	Loretta Németh	9 December 1995 (aged 21)	(Hungarian Football Federation) Győr
	FW	Kinga Siklér	24 December 1995 (aged 21)	(Hungarian Football Federation) Viktória
	FW	Fanny Vágó	23 July 1991 (aged 25)	(Austrian Football Association) St. Pölten
	FW	Dóra Zeller	6 January 1995 (aged 22)	(German Football Association) 1899 Hoffenheim

=== Ireland ===
Coach: (England) Colin Bell

The squad was announced on 13 February 2017. On 28 February 2017, Bell announced the additions of Marie Hourihan, Claire O'Riordan, and Harriet Scott to the squad.

No.	Pos.	Player	Date of birth (age)	Club
	GK	Emma Byrne	14 June 1979 (aged 37)	(The Football Association) Brighton & Hove Albion
	GK	Marie Hourihan	10 March 1988 (aged 28)	(The Football Association) Manchester City
	GK	Amanda McQuillan	24 March 1998 (aged 18)	(Football Association of Ireland) Shelbourne
	DF	Jetta Berrill	31 January 1994 (aged 23)	(Football Association of Ireland) UCD Waves
	DF	Diane Caldwell	11 September 1988 (aged 28)	(German Football Association) SC Sand
	DF	Megan Campbell	28 June 1993 (aged 23)	(The Football Association) Manchester City
	DF	Savannah McCarthy	26 March 1997 (aged 19)	(Scottish Football Association) Glasgow City
	DF	Sophie Perry	11 November 1986 (aged 30)	(The Football Association) Brighton & Hove Albion
	DF	Louise Quinn	17 June 1990 (aged 26)	Unattached
	DF	Harriet Scott	10 February 1993 (aged 24)	(The Football Association) Reading
	MF	Megan Connolly	7 March 1997 (aged 19)	(United States Soccer Federation) Florida State Seminoles
	MF	Karen Duggan	29 May 1991 (aged 25)	(Football Association of Ireland) UCD Waves
	MF	Ruesha Littlejohn	3 July 1990 (aged 26)	(Scottish Football Association) Celtic
	MF	Katie McCabe	21 September 1995 (aged 21)	(The Football Association) Arsenal
	MF	Roma McLaughlin	6 March 1998 (aged 18)	(Football Association of Ireland) Shelbourne
	MF	Denise O'Sullivan	4 February 1994 (aged 23)	(United States Soccer Federation) Houston Dash
	MF	Julie-Ann Russell	28 March 1991 (aged 25)	(Football Association of Ireland) UCD Waves
	FW	Leanne Kiernan	27 April 1999 (aged 17)	(Football Association of Ireland) Shelbourne
	FW	Noelle Murray	25 December 1989 (aged 27)	(Scottish Football Association) Glasgow City
	FW	Áine O'Gorman	13 May 1989 (aged 27)	(Football Association of Ireland) UCD Waves
	FW	Claire O'Riordan	12 October 1994 (aged 22)	(Football Association of Ireland) Wexford Youths
	FW	Stephanie Roche	13 June 1989 (aged 27)	(The Football Association) Sunderland
	FW	Clare Shine	18 May 1995 (aged 21)	(Scottish Football Association) Glasgow City

=== Wales ===
Coach: Jayne Ludlow

The squad was announced on 13 February 2017.

No.	Pos.	Player	Date of birth (age)	Club
	GK	Emma Gibbon	6 February 1999 (aged 18)	(Football Australia) Eastern Suburbs
	GK	Laura O'Sullivan	23 August 1991 (aged 25)	(Football Association of Wales) Cardiff City
	GK	Claire Skinner	17 February 1997 (aged 20)	(Football Association of Wales) Cyncoed
	DF	Loren Dykes	5 February 1988 (aged 29)	(The Football Association) Bristol City
	DF	Gemma Evans	1 August 1996 (aged 20)	(Football Association of Wales) Cardiff City
	DF	Sophie Ingle	2 September 1991 (aged 25)	(The Football Association) Liverpool
	DF	Shaunna Jenkins	27 August 1999 (aged 17)	(Football Association of Wales) Cardiff City
	DF	Hayley Ladd	6 October 1993 (aged 23)	(The Football Association) Bristol City
	DF	Rhiannon Roberts	30 August 1990 (aged 26)	(The Football Association) Doncaster Rovers Belles
	DF	Amina Vine	19 March 2001 (aged 15)	(The Football Association) Bristol City
	MF	Emma Beynon	4 March 1996 (aged 20)	(Football Association of Wales) Swansea City
	MF	Charlie Estcourt	27 May 1998 (aged 18)	(The Football Association) Reading
	MF	Georgia Evans	16 October 1995 (aged 21)	(The Football Association) Bristol City
	MF	Jess Fishlock	14 January 1987 (aged 30)	(Football Australia) Melbourne City
	MF	Melissa Fletcher	28 January 1992 (aged 25)	(The Football Association) Reading
	MF	Angharad James	1 June 1994 (aged 22)	(The Football Association) Notts County
	MF	Hannah Miles	13 April 1998 (aged 18)	(Football Association of Wales) Cardiff City
	MF	Bronwen Thomas	10 February 2000 (aged 17)	(The Football Association) Brighton & Hove Albion
	FW	Kayleigh Green	22 March 1988 (aged 28)	(Italian Football Federation) Chieti
	FW	Natasha Harding	2 March 1989 (aged 27)	(The Football Association) Liverpool
	FW	Nadia Lawrence	29 November 1989 (aged 27)	(The Football Association) Yeovil Town
	FW	Rachel Rowe	13 September 1992 (aged 24)	(The Football Association) Reading
	FW	Helen Ward	26 April 1986 (aged 30)	(The Football Association) Yeovil Town

== Player representation ==
Statistics are per the beginning of the competition.

=== By club ===
Clubs with 5 or more players represented are listed.

Players	Club
9	(Czech Republic) Slavia Prague
8	(South Korea) Incheon Hyundai Steel Red Angels
7	(Scotland) Glasgow City
6	(Belgium) Anderlecht, (Hungary) MTK Hungária, (Italy) Verona
5	(Austria) St. Pölten, (Czech Republic) Sparta Prague, (England) Bristol City, (England) Reading, (Germany) Bayern Munich, (Hungary) Ferencváros, (Hungary) Viktória, (Italy) Brescia, (Italy) Fiorentina, (Switzerland) Zürich

=== By club nationality ===
Players	Clubs
36	Germany
33	England
25	Italy
20	South Korea
18	Czech Republic
17	Hungary
14	Belgium
12	Switzerland
11	United States
10	Scotland
9	Austria
8	(Republic of Ireland) Ireland, New Zealand
6	Sweden, Wales
5	France
4	Australia, Netherlands
1	Japan

=== By club federation ===
Players	Federation
203	UEFA
25	AFC
11	CONCACAF
8	OFC

=== By representatives of domestic league ===
National squad	Players
Italy	22
South Korea	20
Czech Republic	18
Hungary	17
Belgium	14
Switzerland	10
Austria	8
Republic of Ireland	8
New Zealand	8
Scotland	6
Wales	6
