= 2016 Torneio Internacional de Manaus de Futebol Feminino squads =

The 2016 International Women's Football Tournament of Manaus (also known as the 2016 Torneio Internacional de Manaus de Futebol Feminino) is an invitational football tournament held every December in Brazil. The 2016 tournament will from December 7–18, 2016.

Tournament rules allow a 23-member roster. Players marked (c) were named as captain for their national squad. Totals for caps and goals, club affiliations, and ages are as of the opening day of the tournament on 7 December 2016.

== Squads ==
=== Brazil ===
Coach: (Portugal) Emily Lima

No.	Pos.	Player	Date of birth (age)	Caps	Goals	Club
	GK	Bárbara	4 July 1988 (age 37)	46	0	(Brazilian Football Confederation) CBF
	GK	Letícia	13 August 1994 (age 31)	1	0	(Brazilian Football Confederation) Corinthians
	GK	Viviane	15 September 1989 (age 36)	0	0	(Brazilian Football Confederation) São José
	DF	Fabiana	4 August 1989 (age 36)	77	7	(Chinese Football Association) Dalian Quanjian
	DF	Poliana	6 February 1991 (age 35)	50	5	(United States Soccer Federation) Houston Dash
	DF	Tamires	10 October 1987 (age 38)	62	3	(Danish Football Association) Fortuna Hjørring
	DF	Camila	10 October 1994 (age 31)	3	0	(Brazilian Football Confederation) Corinthians
	DF	Monica	21 April 1987 (age 39)	32	5	(Football Australia) Adelaide United
	DF	Rafaelle	18 June 1991 (age 34)	33	2	(Chinese Football Association) Changchun Zhuoyue
	DF	Bruna	16 October 1985 (age 40)	45	4	(United States Soccer Federation) Houston Dash
	DF	Ana Alice	14 March 1989 (age 37)	0	0	(Israel Football Association) Kiryat Gat
	MF	Formiga	3 March 1978 (age 48)	155	25	(Brazilian Football Confederation) CBF
	MF	Thaisa	17 December 1988 (age 37)	54	3	(Brazilian Football Confederation) Corinthians
	MF	Andressinha	1 May 1995 (age 30)	41	1	(Brazilian Football Confederation) Ferroviária
	MF	Francielle	18 October 1989 (age 36)	50	2	(Brazilian Football Confederation) Corinthians
	MF	Debinha	20 October 1991 (age 34)	50	17	(Chinese Football Association) Dalian Quanjian
	MF	Gabi Nunes	10 March 1997 (age 29)	0	0	(Brazilian Football Confederation) Corinthians
	MF	Gabi Zanotti	28 February 1985 (age 41)	34	2	(Chinese Football Association) Dalian Quanjian
	FW	Rafaela	4 December 1993 (age 32)	0	0	(Brazilian Football Confederation) Francana
	FW	Adriane Nenê	20 July 1988 (age 37)	9	0	(Brazilian Football Confederation) Corinthians
	FW	Millene	13 December 1994 (age 31)	0	0	(Brazilian Football Confederation) Rio Preto
	FW	Bia	17 December 1993 (age 32)	38	8	(Korea Football Association) Hyundai Red Angels
	FW	Chú	27 February 1990 (age 36)	7	0	(Brazilian Football Confederation) Corinthians

=== Costa Rica ===
Coach: Amelia Valverde

No.	Pos.	Player	Date of birth (age)	Caps	Goals	Club
	GK	Dinnia Díaz	14 January 1988 (age 38)	38	0	(Costa Rican Football Federation) AD Moravia
	GK	Yolian Salas	7 April 1997 (age 29)	1	0	(Costa Rican Football Federation) AD Moravia
	DF	Wendy Acosta	19 December 1989 (age 36)	55	18	(Costa Rican Football Federation) AD Moravia
	DF	Mariana Benavides	26 December 1994 (age 31)	21	4	(Costa Rican Football Federation) C.S. Herediano
	DF	Valeria del Campo		36	17	(Costa Rican Football Federation) Deportivo Saprissa
	DF	María Paula Coto	2 March 1998 (age 28)	5	0	(Costa Rican Football Federation) L.D. Alajuelense
	DF	María Paula Elizondo	30 November 1998 (age 27)	3	0	(Costa Rican Football Federation) Dimas Alajuela
	DF	Gabriela Guillén	1 March 1992 (age 34)	17	0	(Costa Rican Football Federation) Deportivo Saprissa
	DF	Fabiola Villalobos	13 March 1998 (age 28)	4	0	(United States Soccer Federation) Soccer Institute at Montverde Academy
	MF	Katherine Alvarado	11 April 1991 (age 35)	65	20	(Costa Rican Football Federation) Deportivo Saprissa
	MF	Mariela Campos		0	0	(Costa Rican Football Federation) AD Moravia
	MF	Fernanda Chavarría		0	0	(Costa Rican Football Federation) Arenal Coronado
	MF	Cristín Granados	19 August 1989 (age 36)	71	12	(Costa Rican Football Federation) Deportivo Saprissa
	MF	María José Morales		0	0	(Costa Rican Football Federation) AD Moravia
	MF	Gloriana Villalobos	20 August 1999 (age 26)	23	2	(Costa Rican Football Federation) Deportivo Saprissa
	FW	María Barrantes	25 January 1996 (age 30)	31	21	(Costa Rican Football Federation) AD Moravia
	FW	Indira González	9 January 1998 (age 28)	1	0	(Costa Rican Football Federation) Dimas Escazú
	FW	Melissa Herrera	10 October 1996 (age 29)	37	17	(Costa Rican Football Federation) Deportivo Saprissa
	FW	Carolina Venegas	28 September 1991 (age 34)	48	17	(Costa Rican Football Federation) Deportivo Saprissa
	FW	Karla Villalobos	16 July 1989 (age 36)	21	12	(Costa Rican Football Federation) C.S. Herediano

=== Italy ===
Coach: Antonio Cabrini

No.	Pos.	Player	Date of birth (age)	Caps	Goals	Club
	GK	Alessia Gritti	April 24, 1987 (aged 29)			(Italian Football Federation) Mozzanica
	GK	Katja Schroffenegger	28 April 1991 (aged 25)			(Italian Football Federation) Unterland Damen
	GK	Ilaria Toniolo	9 May 1997 (aged 19)			(Italian Football Federation) Chieti
	DF	Elisa Bartoli	7 May 1991 (aged 25)			(Italian Football Federation) Fiorentina Women's F.C.
	DF	Lisa Boattin	3 May 1997 (aged 19)			(Italian Football Federation) AGSM Verona
	DF	Sara Gama	27 March 1989 (aged 27)			(Italian Football Federation) Brescia Calcio Femminile
	DF	Elena Linari	15 April 1994 (aged 22)			(Italian Football Federation) Fiorentina Women's F.C.
	DF	Cecilia Salvai	2 December 1993 (aged 23)			(Italian Football Federation) Brescia Calcio Femminile
	DF	Linda Tucceri Cimini	4 April 1991 (aged 25)			(Italian Football Federation) San Zaccaria
	DF	Giorgia Spinelli	12 December 1994 (aged 21)			(Italian Football Federation) Inter Milano
	MF	Daniela Stracchi	2 September 1983 (aged 33)			(Italian Football Federation) Mozzanica
	MF	Aurora Galli	13 December 1996 (aged 19)			(Italian Football Federation) AGSM Verona
	MF	Alia Guagni	1 October 1987 (aged 29)			(Italian Football Federation) Fiorentina Women's F.C.
	MF	Barbara Bonansea	13 June 1991 (aged 25)			(Italian Football Federation) Brescia Calcio Femminile
	MF	Alice Parisi	11 December 1990 (aged 25)			(Italian Football Federation) Fiorentina Women's F.C.
	MF	Valentina Bergamaschi	22 January 1997 (aged 19)			(Swiss Football Association) FC Neunkirch
	MF	Elisa Mele	24 August 1996 (aged 20)			(Italian Football Federation) Brescia Calcio Femminile
	MF	Valery Vigilucci	15 April 1997 (aged 19)			(Italian Football Federation) Fiorentina Women's F.C.
	FW	Patrizia Caccamo	12 March 1984 (aged 32)			(Italian Football Federation) Fiorentina Women's F.C.
	FW	Melania Gabbiadini	28 August 1983 (aged 33)			(Italian Football Federation) AGSM Verona
	FW	Ilaria Mauro	22 May 1988 (aged 28)			(Italian Football Federation) Fiorentina Women's F.C.
	FW	Martina Piemonte	7 November 1997 (aged 19)			(Italian Football Federation) AGSM Verona
	FW	Azzurra Principi	13 May 1992 (aged 24)			(Italian Football Federation) San Zaccaria

=== Russia ===
Coach: Elena Fomina

No.	Pos.	Player	Date of birth (age)	Caps	Goals	Club
	GK	Yulia Grichenko	3 October 1990 (age 35)	2	-7	(Russian Football Union) WFC Rossiyanka
	GK	Alena Belyaeva	13 February 1992 (age 34)	2	-1	(Russian Football Union) WFC Chertanovo
	DF	Anna Kozhnikova	10 July 1987 (age 38)	4	0	(Russian Football Union) WFC Rossiyanka
	DF	Anna Belomytsceva	24 November 1996 (age 29)	2	0	(Russian Football Union) Ryazan VDV
	DF	Yulia Gordeeva	5 January 1988 (age 38)	1	0	(Russian Football Union) WFC Chertanovo
	DF	Elvira Ziyastova	13 February 1991 (age 35)	4	0	(Russian Football Union) WFC Rossiyanka
	DF	Tatiana Scheikina	14 November 1991 (age 34)	4	0	(Russian Football Union) WFC CSKA
	DF	Kseniya Kovalenko	26 May 1995 (age 30)	1	0	(Russian Football Union) WFC Rossiyanka
	MF	Anna Cholovyaga	8 May 1992 (age 33)	4	0	(Russian Football Union) WFC Rossiyanka
	MF	Daria Makarenko	7 March 1992 (age 34)	4	1	(Russian Football Union) Zvezda 2005
	MF	Elena Morozova	15 March 1987 (age 39)	3	0	(Russian Football Union) Kubanochka
	MF	Anastasia Pozdeeva	12 June 1993 (age 32)	2	0	(Russian Football Union) Zvezda 2005
	MF	Alena Andreeva	21 November 1997 (age 28)	3	0	(Russian Football Union) WFC Chertanovo
	MF	Elena Terekhova	5 July 1987 (age 38)	3	0	(Russian Football Union) WFC Rossiyanka
	MF	Margarita Chernomyrdina	6 March 1996 (age 30)	4	0	(Russian Football Union) WFC Chertanovo
	MF	Ekaterina Pantyukhina	9 April 1993 (age 33)	4	1	(Russian Football Union) Zvezda 2005
	MF	Ekaterina Sochneva	12 August 1995 (age 30)	3	0	(Russian Football Union) WFC Rossiyanka
	FW	Nadezhda Karpova	9 March 1995 (age 31)	4	2	(Russian Football Union) WFC Chertanovo
