= Chládek =

Chládek (feminine: Chládková, in Slovak also Chládeková) is a Czech and Slovak surname. It is derived from the word chlad, meaning 'coolness.' Notable people with the surname include:

- Anton Chladek (1794–1882), Romanian painter
- Dana Chladek (born Dana Chládková; 1963), Czech-American kayaker
- Denisa Chládková (born 1979), Czech tennis player
- Marcel Chládek (born 1968), Czech politician
- Patrícia Chládeková (born 1997), Slovak footballer
- Zdeněk Chládek (born 1990), Czech boxer
