= Aye Formation =

Geologic formation in France

- Stratigraphic range: Famennian
- Type: Geological formation
- Unit of: Condroz Group

Lithology
- Primary: Shales and siltstones
- Other: Sandstone

Location
- Location: Dinant synclinorium, Ardennes, Belgium

The Aye Formation is a geologic formation in the Dinant synclinorium, Ardennes, Belgium. It is part of the Condroz Group, at the base of the middle Famennian (Upper Devonian). It is characterized by the presence of a conodont fossil Palmatolepis rhomboidea.

It is composed mostly of greenish shales and siltstones with some lenses of sandstone. As it formed in an offshore position, in a subtidal wave-influenced environment, bioturbation features are significant. Cross-bedding structures also occur.

The stratotype is located in the area of Houyet and Aye in Belgium.
