= 2018 Cyprus Women's Cup =

2018 Cyprus Cup
Tournament details
- Host country: Cyprus
- Dates: 28 February – 7 March
- Teams: 12 (from 3 confederations)
- Venues: 6 (in 3 host cities)

Final positions
- Champions: Spain (1st title)
- Runners-up: Italy
- Third place: North Korea
- Fourth place: Switzerland

Tournament statistics
- Matches played: 24
- Goals scored: 51 (2.13 per match)
- Top scorer(s): (Czech Republic) Tereza Kožárová (Finland) Emmi Alanen (Italy) Cristiana Girelli (3 goals)
- Best player: (South Africa) Thembi Kgatlana

The 2018 Cyprus Cup was the eleventh edition of the Cyprus Cup, an invitational women's football tournament held annually in Cyprus. It took place from 28 February to 7 March 2018.

Spain won the title for the first time after defeating Italy 2–0 in the final.

== Format ==
The twelve invited teams were split into three groups to play a round-robin tournament.

Points awarded in the group stage follow the standard formula of three points for a win, one point for a draw and zero points for a loss. In the case of two teams being tied on the same number of points in a group, their head-to-head result determine the higher place.

1st place match: Winners of Groups A and B.
3rd place match: Winner of Group C and best runner-up from Groups A and B.
5th place match: Runner-up in Group C and second-best runner-up from Groups A and B.
7th place match: Third-place teams in Groups A and B.
9th place match: Third-place team in Group C and best fourth-place team from Groups A and B.
11th place match: Fourth-place team in Group C and second-best fourth-place team from Groups A and B.

== Venues ==
| Stadium | City | Capacity |
|---|---|---|
| GSZ Stadium | Larnaca | 13,032 |
| AEK Arena | Larnaca | 7,400 |
| Antonis Papadopoulos Stadium | Larnaca | 10,230 |
| Ammochostos Stadium | Larnaca | 5,500 |
| Tasos Markos Stadium | Paralimni | 5,800 |
| GSP Stadium | Nicosia | 22,859 |

== Teams ==
| Team | FIFA Rankings (December 2017) |
|---|---|
| North Korea | 11 |
| Spain | 13 |
| Italy | 17 |
| Switzerland | 17 |
| Austria | 21 |
| Belgium | 22 |
| Finland | 28 |
| Czech Republic | 34 |
| Wales | 35 |
| Hungary | 43 |
| Slovakia | 47 |
| South Africa | 54 |

== Group stage ==
The groups and schedule were announced on 18 January 2018.

=== Group A ===
| Pos | Team | Pld | W | D | L | GF | GA | GD | Pts |
|---|---|---|---|---|---|---|---|---|---|
| 1 | Italy | 3 | 2 | 1 | 0 | 8 | 2 | +6 | 7 |
| 2 | Switzerland | 3 | 1 | 1 | 1 | 4 | 3 | +1 | 4 |
| 3 | Wales | 3 | 1 | 1 | 1 | 1 | 3 | −2 | 4 |
| 4 | Finland | 3 | 0 | 1 | 2 | 2 | 7 | −5 | 1 |

Source: Cypruswomenscup
Rules for classification: 1) Points; 2) Goal difference; 3) Goals scored
28 February 2018
13:00

| Finland | 0–1 | Wales |
|---|---|---|
| | Report | Green 56' |

Antonis Papadopoulos Stadium, Larnaca
28 February 2018
18:00

| Italy | 3–0 | Switzerland |
|---|---|---|
| Bonansea 4'; Bergamaschi 33'; Girelli 87' | Report |

Antonis Papadopoulos Stadium, Larnaca

2 March 2018
13:00

| Wales | 0–3 | Italy |
|---|---|---|
| | Report | Girelli 18', 44'; Adami 86' |

GSZ Stadium, Larnaca
2 March 2018
18:00

| Switzerland | 4–0 | Finland |
|---|---|---|
| Lehmann 17'; Widmer 52'; Crnogorčević 68'; Bernauer 77' | Report |

GSZ Stadium, Larnaca

5 March 2018
13:00

| Finland | 2–2 | Italy |
|---|---|---|
| Alanen 25' (pen.), 50' (pen.) | Report | Giacinti 28'; Giugliano 86' (pen.) |

AEK Arena, Larnaca
5 March 2018
13:00

| Switzerland | 0–0 | Wales |
|---|---|---|
| | Report |

GSZ Stadium, Larnaca

=== Group B ===
| Pos | Team | Pld | W | D | L | GF | GA | GD | Pts |
|---|---|---|---|---|---|---|---|---|---|
| 1 | Spain | 3 | 2 | 1 | 0 | 4 | 0 | +4 | 7 |
| 2 | Belgium | 3 | 1 | 1 | 1 | 3 | 2 | +1 | 4 |
| 3 | Austria | 3 | 1 | 0 | 2 | 2 | 4 | −2 | 3 |
| 4 | Czech Republic | 3 | 1 | 0 | 2 | 2 | 5 | −3 | 3 |

Source: Cypruswomenscup
Rules for classification: 1) Points; 2) Goal difference; 3) Goals scored
28 February 2018
13:00

| Belgium | 1–2 | Czech Republic |
|---|---|---|
| De Caigny 76' | Report | Svitková 15'; Kožárová 27' |

GSZ Stadium, Larnaca
28 February 2018
18:00

| Austria | 0–2 | Spain |
|---|---|---|
| | Report | García 31'; Vilas 76' |

GSZ Stadium, Larnaca
Referee: Petra Pavlikova (Slovenia)

2 March 2018
13:00

| Czech Republic | 0–2 | Austria |
|---|---|---|
| | Report | Feiersinger 68', 70' |

AEK Arena, Larnaca
2 March 2018
18:00

| Spain | 0–0 | Belgium |
|---|---|---|
| | Report |

AEK Arena, Larnaca
Referee: Florence Guillemin (France)

5 March 2018
18:00

| Belgium | 2–0 | Austria |
|---|---|---|
| Coryn 36'; Jaques 74' | Report |

GSZ Stadium, Larnaca
5 March 2018
18:00

| Spain | 2–0 | Czech Republic |
|---|---|---|
| Paredes 29'; Putellas 90+3' | Report |

AEK Arena, Larnaca
Referee: Lina Lehtovaara (Finland)

=== Group C ===
| Pos | Team | Pld | W | D | L | GF | GA | GD | Pts |
|---|---|---|---|---|---|---|---|---|---|
| 1 | North Korea | 3 | 2 | 1 | 0 | 3 | 0 | +3 | 7 |
| 2 | South Africa | 3 | 1 | 2 | 0 | 1 | 0 | +1 | 5 |
| 3 | Slovakia | 3 | 0 | 2 | 1 | 1 | 2 | −1 | 2 |
| 4 | Hungary | 3 | 0 | 1 | 2 | 1 | 4 | −3 | 1 |

Source: Cypruswomenscup
Rules for classification: 1) Points; 2) Goal difference; 3) Goals scored
28 February 2018
13:00

| Slovakia | 0–0 | South Africa |
|---|---|---|
| | Report |

Tasos Markos Stadium, Paralimni
28 February 2018
18:00

| Hungary | 0–2 | North Korea |
|---|---|---|
| | Report | Kim Yun-mi 56', 89' |

Tasos Markos Stadium, Paralimni

2 March 2018
13:00

| North Korea | 1–0 | Slovakia |
|---|---|---|
| Kim Phyong-hwa 60' | Report |

Tasos Markos Stadium, Paralimni
2 March 2018
18:00

| South Africa | 1–0 | Hungary |
|---|---|---|
| Kgatlana 21' | Report |

Tasos Markos Stadium, Paralimni

5 March 2018
13:00

| South Africa | 0–0 | North Korea |
|---|---|---|
| | Report |

Tasos Markos Stadium, Paralimni
5 March 2018
18:00

| Hungary | 1–1 | Slovakia |
|---|---|---|
| Jakabfi 30' | Report | Fischerová 62' |

Tasos Markos Stadium, Paralimni

== Placement matches ==
=== Eleventh place game ===
7 March 2018
11:00

| Hungary | 0–2 | Finland |
|---|---|---|
| | Report | Sällström 21'; Alanen 60' |

Tasos Markos Stadium, Paralimni

=== Ninth place game ===
7 March 2018
11:00

| Slovakia | 2–5 | Czech Republic |
|---|---|---|
| Hmírová 40' (pen.); Maťavková 81' | Report | Kožárová 6', 64'; Dědinová 74'; Szewieczková 89'; Svitková 90+5' |

GSZ Stadium, Larnaca

=== Seventh place game ===
7 March 2018
11:00

| Wales | 1–1 | Austria |
|---|---|---|
| Green 86' | Report | Puntigam 13' |
Penalties
| Green (penalty scored); Lawrence (penalty scored); James (penalty missed); Griffiths (penalty missed); Ingle (penalty missed) | 2–3 | (penalty missed) Feiersinger; (penalty scored) Burger; (penalty scored) Klein; (penalty scored) Wenninger |

AEK Arena, Larnaca

=== Fifth place game ===
7 March 2018
15:00

| South Africa | 1–2 | Belgium |
|---|---|---|
| Matlou 18' | Report | Wullaert 33'; Van Den Abbeele 87' |

GSZ Stadium, Larnaca

=== Third place game ===
7 March 2018
14:00

| North Korea | 2–1 | Switzerland |
|---|---|---|
| Yu Jong-hui 22'; Kim Yun-mi 90+1' | Report | Rinast 90+3' |

Tasos Markos Stadium, Paralimni

=== Final ===
7 March 2018
18:00

| Italy | 0–2 | Spain |
|---|---|---|
| | Report | Sampedro 50'; Guijarro 85' |

AEK Arena, Larnaca
Referee: Lina Lehtovaara (Finland)

== Final standings ==
| Rank | Team |
|---|---|
| 1st place, gold medalist(s) | Spain |
| 2nd place, silver medalist(s) | Italy |
| 3rd place, bronze medalist(s) | North Korea |
| 4 | Switzerland |
| 5 | Belgium |
| 6 | South Africa |
| 7 | Austria |
| 8 | Wales |
| 9 | Czech Republic |
| 10 | Slovakia |
| 11 | Finland |
| 12 | Hungary |

== Goalscorers ==
3 goals

- (Czech Republic) Tereza Kožárová
- (Finland) Emmi Alanen
- (Italy) Cristiana Girelli
- (North Korea) Kim Yun-mi

2 goals

- (Austria) Laura Feiersinger
- (Czech Republic) Kateřina Svitková
- (Wales) Kayleigh Green

1 goal

- (Austria) Sarah Puntigam
- (Belgium) Jana Coryn
- (Belgium) Tine De Caigny
- (Belgium) Heleen Jaques
- (Belgium) Nicky Van Den Abbeele
- (Belgium) Tessa Wullaert
- (Czech Republic) Aneta Dědinová
- (Czech Republic) Tereza Szewieczková
- (Finland) Olga Ahtinen
- (Hungary) Zsanett Jakabfi
- (Italy) Greta Adami
- (Italy) Valentina Bergamaschi
- (Italy) Barbara Bonansea
- (Italy) Valentina Giacinti
- (Italy) Manuela Giugliano
- (North Korea) Kim Phyong-hwa
- (North Korea) Yu Jong-hui
- (Slovakia) Patrícia Fischerová
- (Slovakia) Patrícia Hmírová
- (Slovakia) Ľudmila Maťavková
- (South Africa) Thembi Kgatlana
- (South Africa) Noko Matlou
- (Spain) Olga García
- (Spain) Patricia Guijarro
- (Spain) Irene Paredes
- (Spain) Alexia Putellas
- (Spain) Amanda Sampedro
- (Spain) Mari Paz Vilas
- (Switzerland) Vanessa Bernauer
- (Switzerland) Ana-Maria Crnogorčević
- (Switzerland) Alisha Lehmann
- (Switzerland) Rachel Rinast
- (Switzerland) Marilena Widmer
