= Lisa Lichtfus =

Belgian footballer (born 1999)

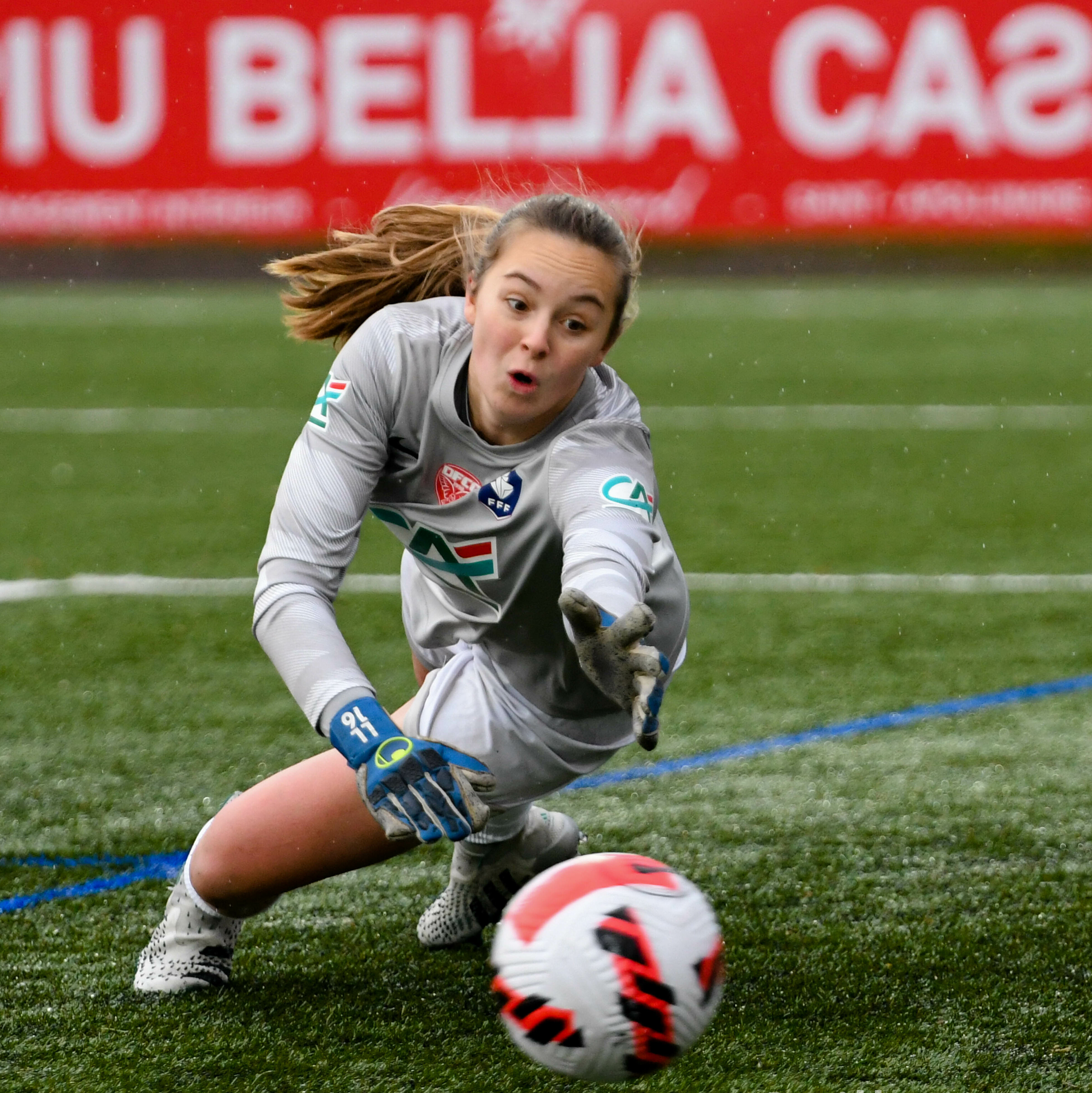
- Lichtfus with Dijon in 2022

Personal information
- Date of birth: 28 December 1999 (age 26)
- Place of birth: Aye, Belgium
- Height: 1.72 m (5 ft 8 in)
- Position: Goalkeeper

Team information
- Current team: TSG Hoffenheim

Senior career*
Years	Team	Apps	(Gls)
2016–2021	Standard Liège	42	(1)
2021–2024	Dijon	39	(0)
2024–2026	Le Havre	25	(0)
2026-	TSG Hoffenheim	0	(0)

International career^{‡}
2016	Belgium U17	2	(0)
2016–2018	Belgium U19	14	(0)
2021–2023	Belgium U23	5	(0)
2023–	Belgium	21	(0)
- * Club domestic league appearances and goals as of 8 June 2026 ‡ National team caps and goals as of 8 June 2026 2024

Lisa Lichtfus (born 28 December 1999) is a Belgian professional footballer who plays as a goalkeeper for Frauen Bundesliga club TSG Hoffenheim and the Belgium women's national team. She has previously played for Standard Liège in the Belgian Women's Super League.

== Club career ==
=== Standard Liège ===
From the age of ten, Lichtfus has risen through the youth ranks at Standard Liège. On 23 August 2016, she made her debut at senior level in the Champions League qualification match against ZFK Minsk. She was part of the Standard Liège team that won the Belgian league title in 2016 and 2017, and the Belgian Cup in 2018. In 2017 and 2019 she received the Sparkle award for best Belgian goalkeeper.

=== Dijon FCO ===
Lichtfus signed with Dijon FCO in June 2021. She made her Dijon debut on 9 January 2022 against PSG in the French Women's Cup, where she was praised for her saves in the goalless draw (PSG won after penalties). In the 2022/23 season she established herself as Dijon's first-choice goalkeeper.

== International career ==
=== Youth ===
Lichtfus played for Belgium's U17, U19, and U23 teams.

=== Senior ===
In June 2017, Lichtfus was called up to the Belgium senior team for the first time. In February 2022, she was included in the Belgium squad which won the Pinatar Cup. In June 2022, Lichtfus was named to the squad for the UEFA Women's Euro 2022. She was the only francophone player in an otherwise Dutch speaking selection: "The players make an effort to speak French as I do to speak Dutch. We understand each other quite well." On 11 April 2023, she earned her first cap in a friendly against Slovenia. In February 2024, she played her first two competitive matches with the Red Flames, in the UEFA Women's Nations League play-offs against Hungary, due to a hamstring injury to regular first-choice keeper Nicky Evrard. Lichtfus maintained her place in goal for Belgium for the whole of 2024, culminating in qualification for the UEFA Women's Euro 2025 via the play-offs, starting both legs of the play-off final against Ukraine.

On 11 June 2025, Lichtfus was called up to the Belgium squad for the UEFA Women's Euro 2025.

== Personal life ==
Lichtfus was born in the village of Aye in Wallonia in 1999. She is a medical student at the University of Liège.

== Honours ==
Standard Liège

- Belgian Women's Super League: 2016, 2017
- Belgian Women's Cup: 2018

Belgium

- Pinatar Cup: 2022

Individual

- Best Belgian female goalkeeper: 2017, 2019
