= Claire Skinner (footballer) =

Welsh footballer (born 1997)

Personal information
- Date of birth: 17 February 1997 (age 29)
- Place of birth: Guildford, England
- Height: 5 ft 8 in (1.73 m)
- Position: Goalkeeper

Youth career
- Guildford Saints
- Chelsea
- Fulham
- Reading

Senior career*
| Years | Team | Apps | (Gls) |
| 2014–2016 | Reading | | |
| 2016 | Cwmbran Celtic | | |
| 2016–2017 | Cyncoed | | |
| 2017 | Aston Villa | | |
| 2017–2018 | Oxford United | | |
| 2018–2020 | Cardiff City Ladies | | |
| 2020 | Cardiff City | 0 | (0) |
| 2020 | Swansea City | 0 | (0) |

International career^{‡}
| 2015– | Wales | 7 | (0) |
- * Club domestic league appearances and goals as of 6 February 2016 ‡ National team caps and goals as of 6 February 2016

Claire Skinner (born 17 February 1997) is a footballer who plays as a goalkeeper for the Wales national team and Welsh Premier Women's Football League club Swansea City.

== Club career ==
Skinner was born in Guildford, and started playing locally with Guildford Saints. Despite starting her game playing as a striker, at the club she replaced the goalkeeper who was unavailable, and played as a goalkeeper since then. She then joined Chelsea's summer camp, resulting in her trialling and playing for the Chelsea under-12 side. As well as Chelsea, she played at youth level for Fulham and Reading. Skinner has played for Cwmbran Celtic and Cyncoed in the Welsh Premier Women's Football League (WPWL). In 2017, Skinner spent some time with Aston Villa, and in July 2017 joined Oxford United. In August 2020, Skinner signed with WPWL side Cardiff City.

== International career ==
Skinner's grandfather is from the district Mumbles, and through him she is eligible to represent Wales. In April 2016, she made her international debut against Kazakhstan, coming on in extra-time of the second half, replacing Laura O'Sullivan. A couple of months later, in June 2016, she made her first start, playing the full ninety minutes of a 2–0 loss to Norway during the Euro 2017 qualifiers. She was then called-up for the remaining qualifiers, against Israel and Austria, playing the full match in the 3–0 victory over Israel. In February 2017, she was called up for the 2017 Cyprus Women's Cup. In February 2018, she was called up for the 2018 Cyprus Women's Cup. In October 2019, she was called up for the Euro 2021 qualifiers.
