= Mimmi Nurmela =

Finnish footballer (born 1996)

Personal information
- Full name: Mimmi Jasmiina Nurmela
- Date of birth: 3 August 1996 (age 30)
- Place of birth: Finland
- Position: Defender

Youth career
- Espoo
- Vantaan Jalkapalloseura

Senior career*
Years	Team	Apps	(Gls)
2011	Espoo	6	(0)
2012–2015	Vantaan Jalkapalloseura	67	(1)
2014–2019	PK-35 Vantaa	71	(0)
2019–2023	HJK	101	(3)
2024–2025	Växjö DFF	17	(0)
2026-	LSK Kvinner		

International career^{‡}
2017–	Finland	3	(0)
- * Club domestic league appearances and goals as of 30 December 2024 ‡ National team caps and goals as of 30 December 2024

Mimmi Jasmiina Nurmela (born 3 August 1996) is a Finnish professional footballer who plays as a defender for Toppserien club LSK Kvinner. Nurmela debuted in the Finland national team in 2017.
