= Alena Belyaeva =

Russian footballer (born 1992)

Personal information
- Date of birth: 13 February 1992 (age 34)
- Place of birth: Russia
- Position: Goalkeeper

Team information
- Current team: BIIK Kazygurt

Senior career*
Years	Team	Apps	(Gls)
2011–2014	Mordovochka Saransk	43	(0)
2015–2019	Chertanovo Moscow	64	(0)
2020	Zenit	6	(0)
2022-	BIIK Kazygurt	0	(0)

International career
2014–	Russia	6	(0)
- * Club domestic league appearances and goals

Alena Belyaeva (born February 13, 1992) is a Russian footballer who plays as a goalkeeper for BIIK Kazygurt at the Kazakhstani women's football championship.

Belyaeva was in the 23-players squad that represented Russia at the UEFA Women's Euro 2017, although she didn't play any of the team's matches in the competition.
