= Greta Adami =

Italian footballer (born 1992)

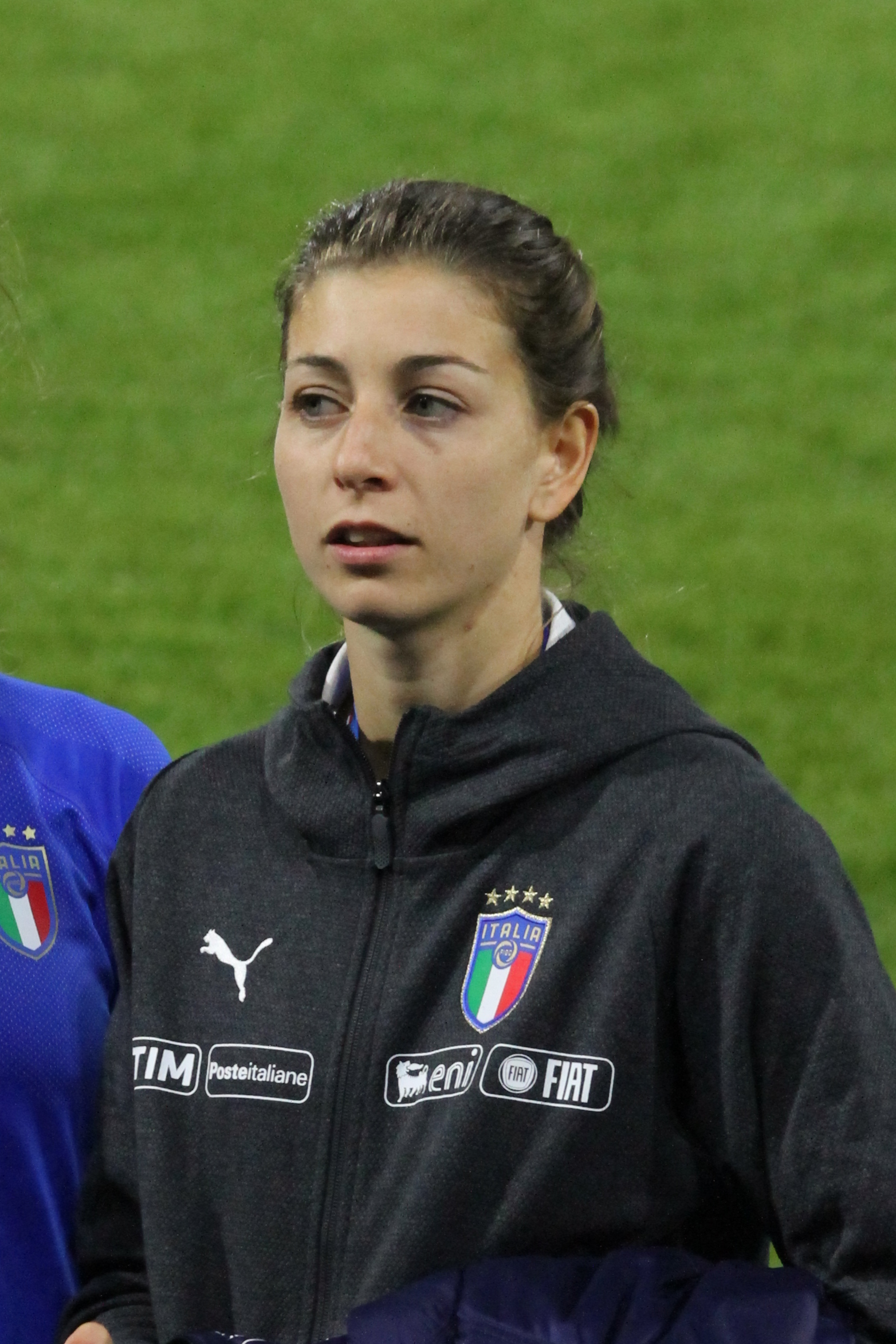
- Adami in 2018

Personal information
- Date of birth: 30 July 1992 (age 34)
- Place of birth: Viareggio, Tuscany, Italy
- Position: Midfielder

Senior career*
Years	Team	Apps	(Gls)
2007–2008	Pisa		
2008–2011	Vigor Misericordia		
2011–2015	Firenze	82	(9)
2015–2018	Fiorentina	117	(8)
2021–2024	A.C. Milan	52	(3)
2024	→ SS Lazio (loan)	15	(1)
2024–2025	Sassuolo	4	(0)
2025	Spezia Calcio		

International career^{‡}
2018–2019	Italy	11	(1)
- * Club domestic league appearances and goals as of 17:04, 24 July 2023 (UTC) ‡ National team caps and goals as of 01:40, 25 November 2019 (UTC)

Greta Adami (born 30 July 1992) is an Italian footballer who plays as a midfielder and has appeared for the Italy women's national team.

After starting her career with Pisa, Vigor Misericordia and Firenze, Adami spent many years playing in the Serie A with Fiorentina, A.C. Milan and in the Serie B with SS Lazio. She has been capped for the Italy women's national team and has played in the Champions League.

== Career ==
On 29 July 2021, Adami was announced at AC Milan on a two year contract. On 4 May 2023, she signed a two-year contract extension with the club until 30 June 2025.

On 12 January 2024, Adami joined Lazio on a loan deal until the end of the season.

On 27 July 2024, Adami was announced at Sassuolo on a permanent transfer.

On 3 February 2025, Adami was announced at Serie C side ASD Spezia Calcio. She initially thought about quitting football completely, but her husband convinced her not to, so she moved back to Spezia to be with her family for personal reasons. She won the league with Spezia, but the club was unable to be promoted and went bankrupt, making Adami a free agent.

== International career ==
In 2017, Adami was called up to a training squad to prepare for the 2017 Euros, but did not make the final squad.

On 19 February 2018, Adami was called up to the Italian squad for the 2018 Cyprus Women's Cup. On 2 March 2018, she scored her first international goal against Wales, scoring in the 86th minute.

On 18 February 2019, Adami was called up to the Italian squad for the 2019 Cyprus Women's Cup.

Adami appeared for the team during the 2019 FIFA Women's World Cup qualifying cycle.

== Coaching career ==
In October 2025, Adami announced she was studying for a UEFA B license.
