= Petra Zdechovanová =

Slovak footballer

Personal information
- Date of birth: 2 November 1995 (age 31)
- Position: Defender

Senior career*
Years	Team	Apps	(Gls)
2015–2018	Czarni Sosnowiec		
2018–2020	Mitech Żywiec	39	(2)
2020–2023	ROW Rybnik	62	(17)
2024–2025	MTS Knurów	14	(7)

International career
	Slovakia	43	(0)
- * Club domestic league appearances and goals as of 12:16, 16 June 2025 (UTC)

Petra Zdechovanová (born 2 November 1995) is a Slovak footballer who plays as a defender. She has appeared for the Slovakia women's national team.

== Career ==
Zdechovanová has been capped for the Slovakia national team, appearing for the team during the 2019 FIFA Women's World Cup qualifying cycle.
