= Boglárka Horti =

Hungarian footballer

Personal information
- Date of birth: 1 July 1998 (age 28)
- Position: Defender

Team information
- Current team: Viktória FC

International career^{‡}
Years	Team	Apps	(Gls)
2014–2015	Hungary U-17	8	(0)
2020–	Hungary	1	(0)
- ‡ National team caps and goals as of 22:48, 21 January 2021 (UTC)

Boglárka Horti (born 1 July 1998) is a Hungarian footballer who plays as a defender for Viktória FC and the Hungary women's national team.

== Career ==
Horti is a member of the Hungary national team. She made her debut for the team on 1 December 2020, against Iceland.

== Personal life ==
Her father, Gábor Horti, is a sports commentator and television presenter. Horti grew up in the village of Csömör.
