= Thaïs Hurni =

Swiss footballer

Personal information
- Full name: Thaïs Hurni
- Place of birth: Yverdon-les-bains, Switzerland,
- Position: Defender

Team information
- Current team: YB Frauen
- Number: 22

Senior career*
Years	Team	Apps	(Gls)
2016-2018	FC Zurich		
2018-2020	YB Frauen	14	(2)
2020-2023	Servette FC Chênois	65	(3)
- * Club domestic league appearances and goals

Thaïs Hurni is a Swiss footballer who plays for YB Frauen playing in the Swiss Women's Super League.

== Honours ==
- Swiss Women's Super League: 2020–21
