= Aye (village) =

Coordinates: 50°14′N 5°18′E

Aye (Walloon: Åye) is a village of Wallonia and a district of the municipality of Marche-en-Famenne, located in the province of Luxembourg, Belgium.

The inhabitants of Aye are called the "Godis" in the Walloon language.

== Radio Station ==
At Aye, there is at 50°12'16"N 5°17'22"E a relay station of RTBF, which was originally used for broadcasting on 1305 kHz with a power of 10 kW.

== Postal Code ==
The postal code is 6900.

== Nearest Airport ==
The nearest airport is at Liege, about 46 km away.

== Geology ==
It gives its name to a geologic formation.

== Accommodation ==
The main accommodation is Château D'Assonville, an impressive castle hotel with 20 rooms, situated in a private park.

The hotel has a restaurant called Le Grand Pavillon.
