= Rosalia Pipitone =

Italian footballer (born 1985)

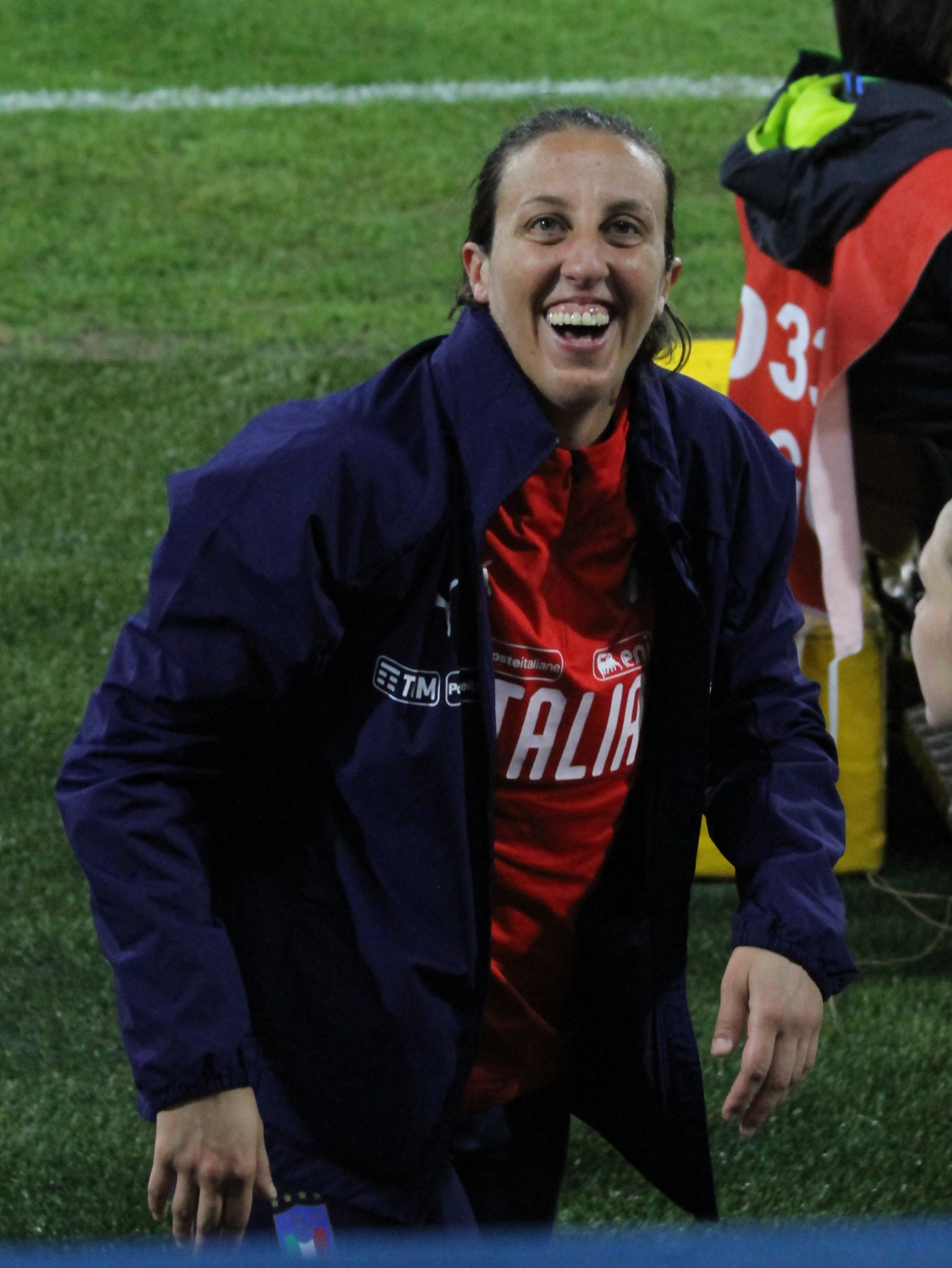

Personal information
- Date of birth: 3 August 1985 (age 41)
- Place of birth: Palermo, Italy
- Height: 1.81 m (5 ft 11 in)
- Position: Goalkeeper

Senior career*
Years	Team	Apps	(Gls)
2006–2011	Aquile Palermo	57+	(0)
2011–2018	Res Roma	150	(0)
2018–2021	Roma	22	(0)

International career
2018–2019	Italy	4	(0)
- * Club domestic league appearances and goals

Rosalia Pipitone (born 3 August 1985) is an Italian former footballer who played as a goalkeeper. She played for Roma in the women's Serie A.

== International career ==
In 2018, she was called up to be part of the national team. She retired from international football in August 2019.
