= Pavlína Nepokojová =

Czech footballer

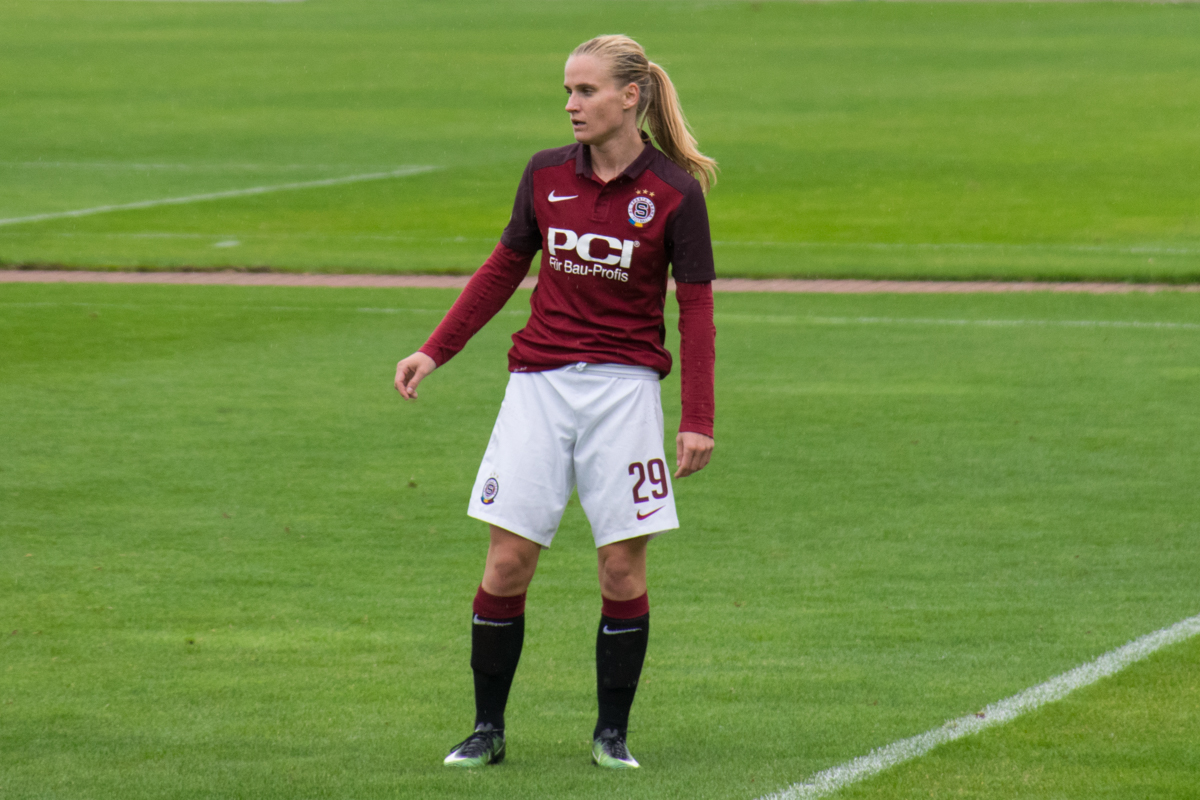

Personal information
- Full name: Pavlína Nepokojová
- Date of birth: 29 January 1989 (age 37)
- Place of birth: Hradec Králové, Czechoslovakia
- Height: 1.68 m (5 ft 6 in)
- Positions: Midfielder; striker

Youth career
- Hradec Králové

College career
Years	Team	Apps	(Gls)
2012–2015	Murray State University		
2015–2016	Seacoast United		

Senior career*
Years	Team	Apps	(Gls)
2009–2017	Hradec Králové		
2009–2012	→ Slavia Prague (loan)		
2017–2020	Sparta Prague		

International career^{‡}
2009–2020	Czech Republic	32	(1)
- * Club domestic league appearances and goals ‡ National team caps and goals as of 6 October 2019

Pavlína Nepokojová (born 29 January 1989) is a former Czech football midfielder, who last played for Sparta Prague in the Czech Women's First League.

She was a member of the Czech national team.
