= Anna Samu =

Hungarian footballer

Personal information
- Date of birth: 5 November 1996 (age 30)
- Position: Goalkeeper

International career^{‡}
Years	Team	Apps	(Gls)
2015–	Hungary	8	(0)
- ‡ National team caps and goals as of 19:39, 30 August 2019 (UTC)

Anna Samu (born 5 November 1996) is a Hungarian footballer who plays as a goalkeeper and has appeared for the Hungary women's national team.

== Career ==
Samu has been capped for the Hungary national team, appearing for the team during the 2019 FIFA Women's World Cup qualifying cycle.
