= Nicky Evrard =

Belgian footballer (born 1995)

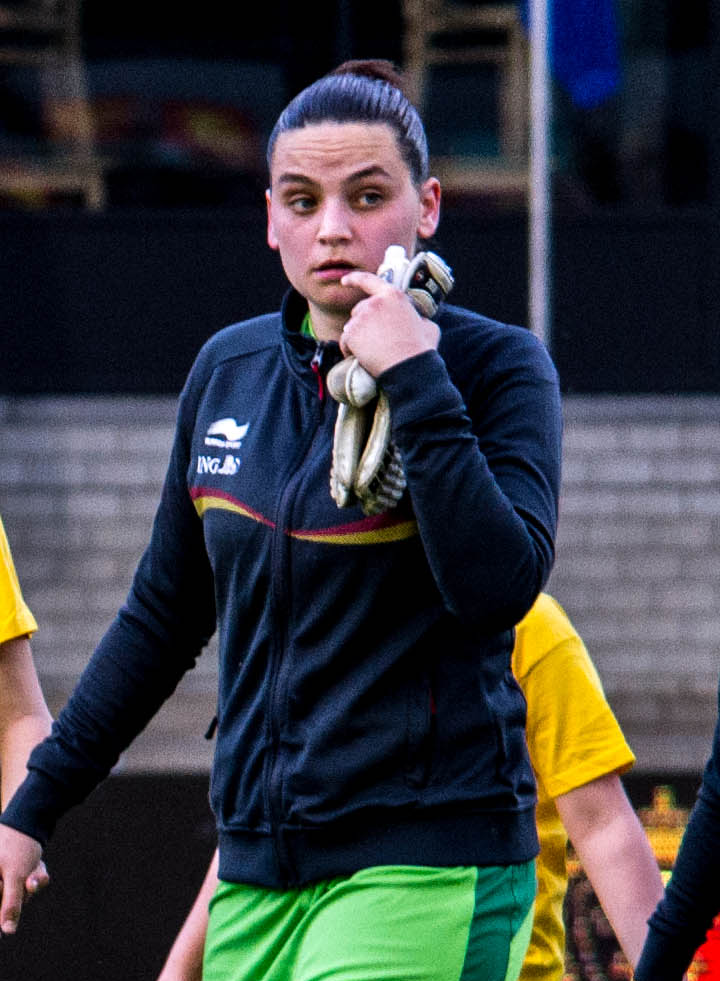
- Nicky Evrard in 2014

Personal information
- Date of birth: 26 May 1995 (age 31)
- Place of birth: Zottegem, Belgium
- Height: 1.76 m (5 ft 9 in)
- Position: Goalkeeper

Team information
- Current team: PSV

Youth career
- Racing Strijpen
- SK Munkzwalm

Senior career*
Years	Team	Apps	(Gls)
2013–2016	AA Gent	51	(0)
2016–2019	FC Twente	42	(0)
2019–2020	Sporting Huelva	0	(0)
2020–2022	Gent	55	(0)
2022–2023	OH Leuven	30	(0)
2023–2024	Chelsea	0	(0)
2023–2024	→ Brighton & Hove Albion (loan)	1	(0)
2024–	PSV	0	(0)

International career^{‡}
2009–2010	Belgium U15	2	(0)
2010–2012	Belgium U17	15	(0)
2012–2013	Belgium U19	6	(0)
2014	Belgium U21	1	(0)
2013–	Belgium	69	(0)
- * Club domestic league appearances and goals as of 9 January 2024 ‡ National team caps and goals as of 5 December 2024

Nicky Evrard (born 26 May 1995) is a Belgian footballer who plays as a goalkeeper for PSV and the Belgium women's national team.

== Club career ==
Evrard started her career at RC Strijpen boy's teams. She was coached by Stefan Van de Voorde, a legendary coach at Eendracht Elene-Grotenberge. In the 2011–12 season, she signed with Cercle Melle. In 2012, the team change its name to AA Gent. In the 2016–17 season, she won the Cup of Belgium with AA Gent. On 17 May 2017, Evrard announced that she would be joining FC Twente.

Evrard joined Women's Super League club Chelsea in the summer of 2023, signing on a season's loan with Brighton & Hove Albion on loan for the 2023–24 season on 14 September 2024. She returned to Chelsea on 9 January 2024 after suffering a long-term hamstring injury.

Chelsea confirmed Evrard's departure for PSV on 19 July 2024.

== International career ==
From 2009 to April 2013, Evrard was part of several Belgium's youth teams. On 2 June 2013, she played for Belgium senior team for the first time in a friendly match against Ukraine. Evrard was also part of the team who represented Belgium at the UEFA Women's Euro 2017. Evrard was in the national team in 2022 alongside Lisa Lichtfus then of Dijon and Diede Lemey who at the time played for Sassuolo.

At the start of 2022, Evrard kept goal in Belgium's winning of the Pinatar Cup for the first time in Spain, beating Russia on penalties in the final after a 0–0 draw.

Evrard was the first-choice goalkeeper for Belgium's UEFA Women's Euro 2022 campaign in England. She was vital to their progression to the quarter-finals despite not being amongst the heavy favourites in their group, and saved both penalties she faced in the group stages, one each against Iceland and France.

Her hamstring injury at the end of 2023 meant Evrard did not play a single international for Belgium in 2024, recovering sufficiently to be substitute goalkeeper in Belgium's final games of their successful UEFA Women's Euro 2025 qualification via the play-offs, and remained on the bench for both legs of the play-off final against Ukraine, with Lisa Lichtfus starting instead.

On 11 June 2025, Evrard was called up to the Belgium squad for the UEFA Women's Euro 2025.

== Personal life ==
Like many of her Belgium teammates, Evrard is semi-professional and when she is not playing football, she is an entrepreneur with her own business renting out bouncy castles.
Evrard is in a relationship with Belgian footballer Shari Van Belle.

== Honours ==
Belgium

- Pinatar Cup: 2022
