= Yu Jong-hui =

North Korean footballer

Personal information
- Date of birth: 21 March 1986 (age 40)
- Place of birth: North Korea
- Position: Defender

Senior career*
Years	Team	Apps	(Gls)
2008	April 25		

International career
2008	North Korea	46 (?)	(0)
- * Club domestic league appearances and goals

Yu Jong-hui (born 21 March 1986,Korean: 유정희) is a North Korean football defender who played for the North Korea women's national football team at the 2008 Summer Olympics. At the club level, she played for April 25.

== See also ==
- North Korea at the 2008 Summer Olympics
