= Alessia Gritti =

Italian association football player (born 1987)

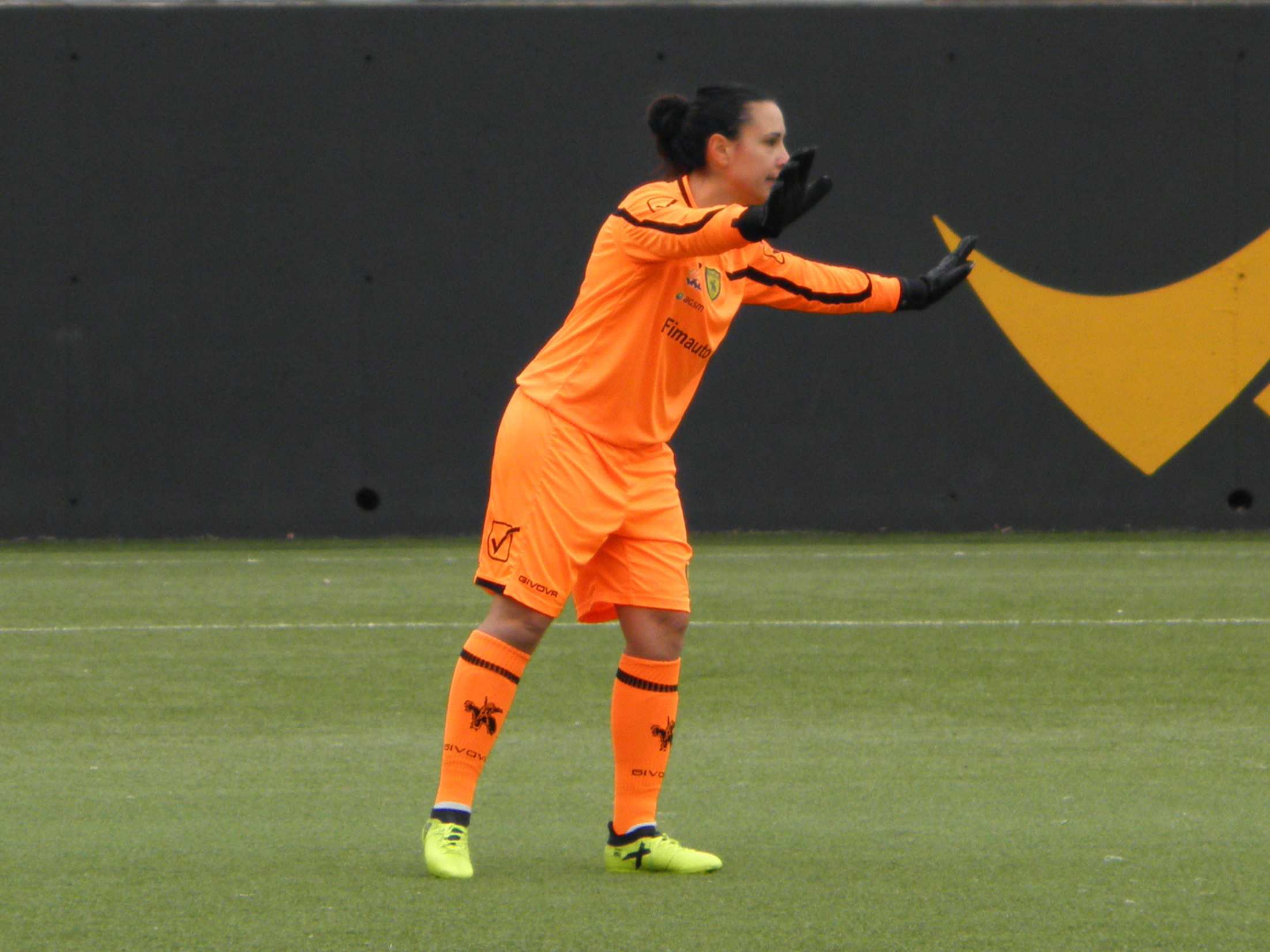

Personal information
- Date of birth: 24 April 1987 (age 39)
- Place of birth: Bergamo, Italy
- Height: 1.66 m (5 ft 5 in)
- Position: Goalkeeper

Alessia Gritti (born 24 April 1987) is an Italian footballer who plays as a goalkeeper for Lumezzane.
