= Patrícia Chládeková =

Slovak footballer (born 1997)

Personal information
- Date of birth: 4 April 1997 (age 29)
- Place of birth: Slovakia
- Position: Goalkeeper

Senior career*
Years	Team	Apps	(Gls)
2017	FC Neunkirch		
2017–2021	Saarbrücken	14	(0)
2021	Wacker Innsbruck		
2022–2023	Sparta Prague	9	(0)
2023–2025	Elversberg		
2025–2026	1. FC Saarbrücken		

International career^{‡}
2013	Slovakia U17	3	(0)
2014–2016	Slovakia U19	4	(0)
	Slovakia U-19 (futsal)	2	(0)
2019–2026	Slovakia	9	(0)
- * Club domestic league appearances and goals as of 05:57, 17 April 2026 (UTC) ‡ National team caps and goals as of 30 August 2025

Patrícia Chládeková (born 4 April 1997) is a Slovak former footballer who last played as a goalkeeper for German club 1. FC Saarbrücken and the Slovakia women's national team.

== Club career ==
=== Early career ===
Chládeková was born in Brezno, Slovakia. At youth level, she started at Podbrezová before later accepting an offer to join Dukla Banská Bystrica. She was top goal scorer in a youth tournament when representing the Bardejov youth team in 2014. She later was promoted to the A-team of Partizán Bardejov, where she would also be nominated to play for the Slovakia women's under-19 team. She helped the club secure second place in the league and win the Slovak cup. That season, she was included in the league's top 11.

=== Career abroad ===
She played for various clubs across Slovakia before transferring to Swiss team FC Neunkirch after high school. There, she achieved significant success by winning the league and the Swiss Cup. In October 2018, she joined the German club 1. FC Saarbrücken. She then transferred to Wacker Innsbruck, where she was the No. 1 keeper, helping the team avoid relegation. In the winter of 2022, Chládeková joined AC Sparta Prague.

== International career ==
She debuted for the U19 side in a match against the UAE, coming on as a substitute. Chládeková was first called up to the Slovak woman's national team for a match in the Cyprus Cup-2019 in Larnaca, where she would concede three times in a 3–2 loss against Hungary.
