= Giorgia Spinelli =

Italian footballer (born 1994)

Personal information
- Date of birth: 12 December 1994 (age 31)
- Place of birth: Italy
- Height: 1.73 m (5 ft 8 in)
- Position: Defender

Team information
- Current team: Bologna

Senior career*
Years	Team	Apps	(Gls)
2011–2015	Mozzanica	28	(1)
2019–2020	Stade de Reims	16	(1)
2020-2021	AC Milan	12	(3)
2021–2023	Sampdoria	36	(3)
2023–2024	Fiorentina	8	(0)
2024–2025	Como	4	(0)
2025–	Bologna	0	(0)

International career^{‡}
2016–2017	Italy	3	(0)
- * Club domestic league appearances and goals as of 03:54, 20 December 2025 (UTC) ‡ National team caps and goals as of 28 May 2023 (UTC)

Giorgia Spinelli (born 12 December 1994) is an Italian professional footballer who most plays as a defender for Serie B club Bologna.
