= Nicky Van Den Abbeele =

Belgian soccer midfielder

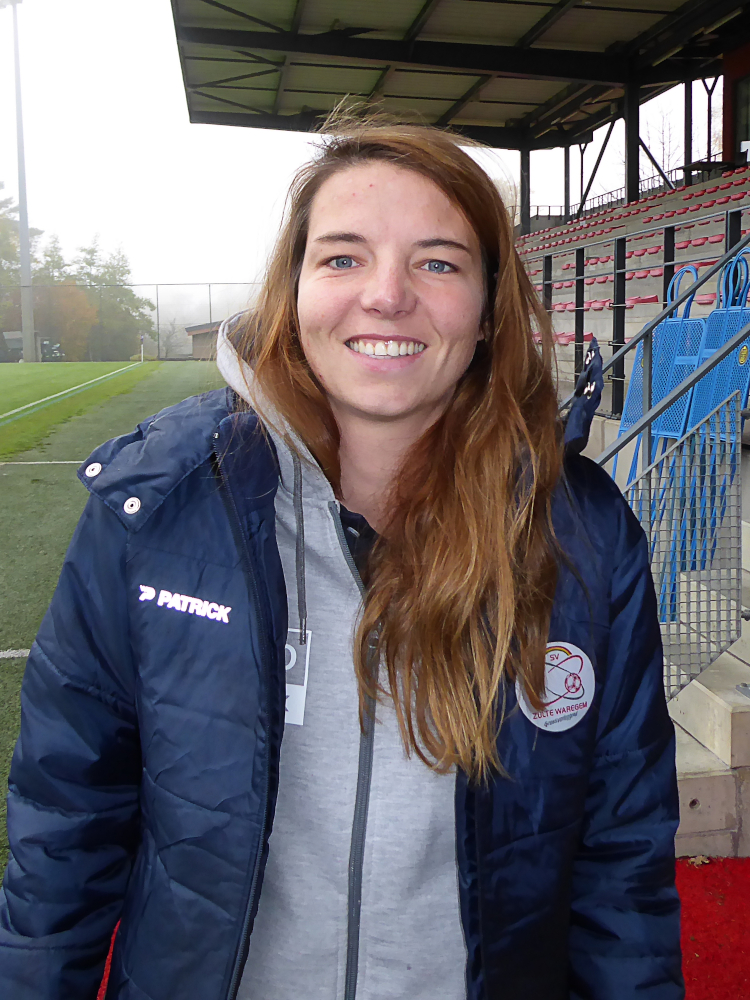
- Nicky Van Den Abbeele in 2022

Personal information
- Full name: Nicky Van Den Abbeele
- Date of birth: 21 February 1994 (age 32)
- Place of birth: Belgium
- Height: 1.74 m (5 ft 9 in)
- Position: Midfielder

Team information
- Current team: Zulte Waregem
- Number: 28

Youth career
- Cerkelladies Brugge
- SV Jabbeke

Senior career*
Years	Team	Apps	(Gls)
2012–2015	Club Brugge KV	68	(11)
2015–2016	Lierse SK		
2016–2017	RSC Anderlecht		
2017–2018	Ajax	2	(0)
2018–2020	Gent	16	(0)
2020-2021	Club YLA	23	(3)
2021-2022	Eendracht Aalst	21	(8)
2022-	Zulte Waregem	27	(3)

International career^{‡}
2010–2011	Belgium U17	9	(2)
2012–2013	Belgium U19	14	(2)
2013–	Belgium	31	(0)
- * Club domestic league appearances and goals as of 16 July 2023 (UTC) ‡ National team caps and goals as of 20 October 2017

Nicky Van Den Abbeele (born 21 February 1994) is a Belgian soccer midfielder who plays for Zulte Waregem of Belgian Women's Super League.

== Club career ==
As a young player, Van Den Abbeele played for Cerkelladies Brugge and SV Jabbeke. In 2012, she joined Club Brugge KV, where she stayed until 2015. In the season 2015–2016 she moved to Lierse SK where she won the Cup of Belgium. In 2016, she signed for RSC Anderlecht. In 2017, she joined AFC Ajax. In 2018 she decided to stop playing, and to concentrate on a career outside the soccerfield.

== International career ==
On 30 August 2010 Van Den Abbeele played her first match for Belgium U17. In the same match she scored her first international goal. On 2 June 2013 she played her first match for the senior team, a friendly match against Ukraine in Tubize. Van Den Abbeele was part of the squad who represented Belgium at the UEFA Women's Euro 2017.
