= Aline Zeler =

Belgian footballer (born 1983)

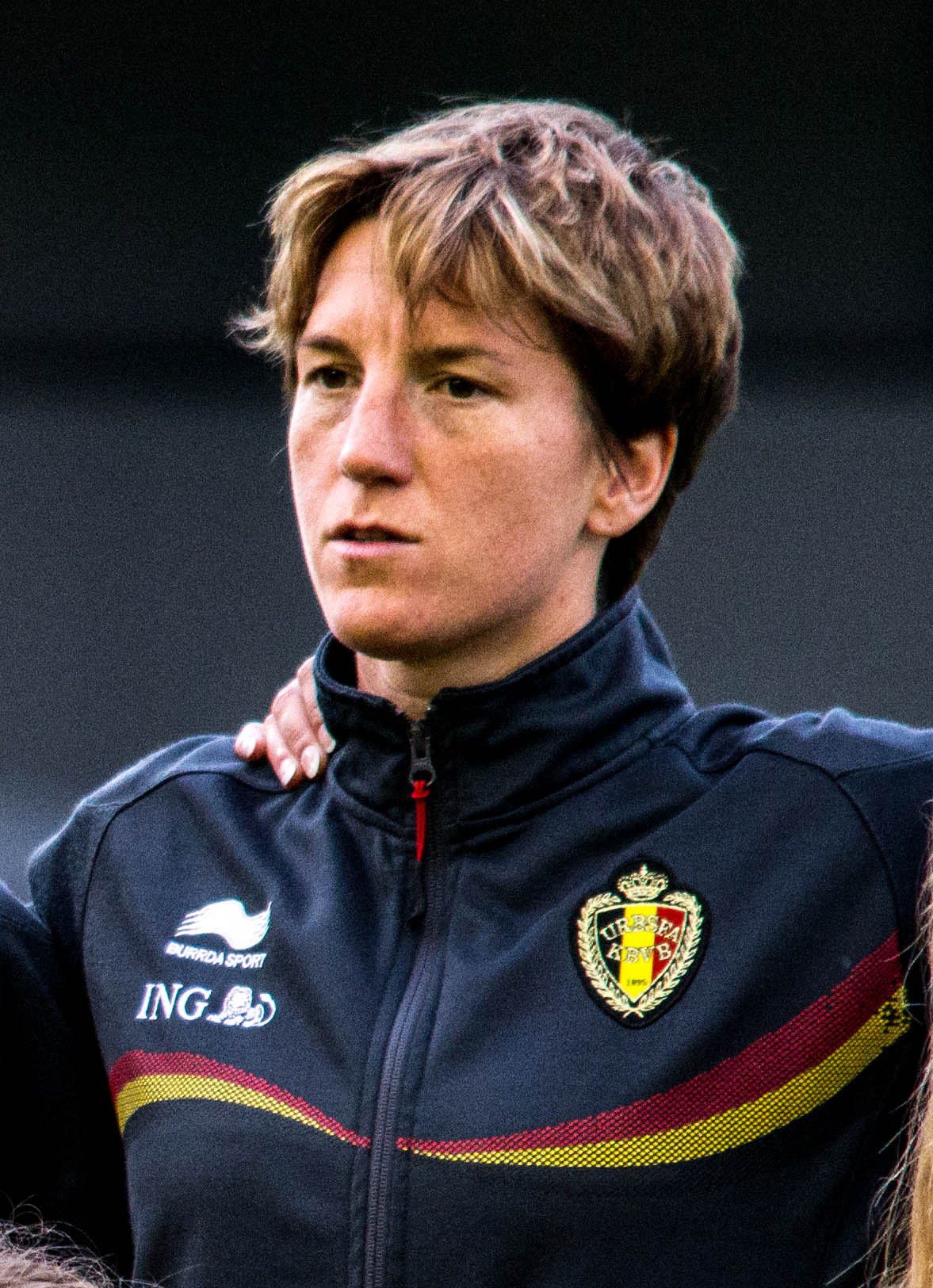
- Zeler in 2014

Personal information
- Date of birth: 2 June 1983 (age 43)
- Place of birth: Libramont-Chevigny, Belgium
- Height: 1.71 m (5 ft 7 in)
- Position: Forward

Team information
- Current team: KRC Genk

Senior career*
Years	Team	Apps	(Gls)
- Tenneville Sports
2004–2006	Standard Liège		
2006–2009	RSC Anderlecht		
2009–2010	Sint-Truiden		
2010–2017	Standard Liège		
2017–2018	RSC Anderlecht		
2018–2019	PSV	24	(3)
2020–	KRC Genk		

International career^{‡}
2005–2019	Belgium	111	(29)
- * Club domestic league appearances and goals as of 4 December 2020 ‡ National team caps and goals as of 1 June 2019

Aline Zeler (born 2 June 1983) is a Belgian footballer who plays as a striker for KRC Genk in Belgian Women's Super League.

== Career ==
From 2018 to 2020 Zeler played for PSV of the Women's Eredivisie. She previously played for Belgian First Division clubs RSC Anderlecht and Sint-Truiden. She was the season's top scorer in 2010 and 2011.

Zeler was a member of the Belgian national team from 2005. She is the record player of the Belgian national team with 111 matches.

== International goals ==
No.	Date	Venue	Opponent	Score	Result	Competition
1.	19 November 2011	Lorzestraat, Dessel, Belgium	Bulgaria	1–0	5–0	UEFA Women's Euro 2013 qualifying
2.	19 November 2011	Lorzestraat, Dessel, Belgium	Bulgaria	4–0	5–0	UEFA Women's Euro 2013 qualifying
3.	15 February 2012	Lorzestraat, Dessel, Belgium	Northern Ireland	1–0	2–2	UEFA Women's Euro 2013 qualifying
4.	19 September 2012	Windsor Park, Belfast, Northern Ireland	Northern Ireland	2–0	2–0	UEFA Women's Euro 2013 qualifying
5.	21 September 2013	King Baudouin Stadium, Brussels, Belgium	Albania	2–0	2–0	2015 FIFA Women's World Cup qualification
6.	26 October 2013	Levadia Municipal Stadium, Livadia, Greece	Greece	1–0	7–1	2015 FIFA Women's World Cup qualification
7.	26 October 2013	Levadia Municipal Stadium, Livadia, Greece	Greece	2–0	7–1	2015 FIFA Women's World Cup qualification
8.	26 October 2013	Levadia Municipal Stadium, Livadia, Greece	Greece	3–1	7–1	2015 FIFA Women's World Cup qualification
9.	31 October 2013	Olympisch Stadion, Antwerp, Belgium	Portugal	1–1	4–1	2015 FIFA Women's World Cup qualification
10.	31 October 2013	Olympisch Stadion, Antwerp, Belgium	Portugal	3–1	4–1	2015 FIFA Women's World Cup qualification
11.	12 February 2014	MAC³PARK Stadion, Zwolle, Netherlands	Netherlands	1–1	1–1	2015 FIFA Women's World Cup qualification
12.	5 April 2014	Niko Dovana Stadium, Durrës, Albania	Albania	4–0	6–0	2015 FIFA Women's World Cup qualification
13.	5 April 2014	Niko Dovana Stadium, Durrës, Albania	Albania	5–0	6–0	2015 FIFA Women's World Cup qualification
14.	5 April 2014	Niko Dovana Stadium, Durrës, Albania	Albania	6–0	6–0	2015 FIFA Women's World Cup qualification
15.	10 April 2014	Den Dreef, Leuven, Belgium	Norway	1–2	1–2	2015 FIFA Women's World Cup qualification
16.	13 September 2014	Den Dreef, Leuven, Belgium	Greece	2–0	11–0	2015 FIFA Women's World Cup qualification
17.	22 September 2015	Den Dreef, Leuven, Belgium	Bosnia and Herzegovina	3–0	6–0	UEFA Women's Euro 2017 qualifying
18.	22 September 2015	Den Dreef, Leuven, Belgium	Bosnia and Herzegovina	5–0	6–0	UEFA Women's Euro 2017 qualifying
19.	3 June 2016	Tamme Stadium, Tartu, Estonia	Estonia	2–0	2–0	UEFA Women's Euro 2017 qualifying

== Honours ==
Sint-Truiden

- Belgian First Division: 2009–2010

Standard Liège

- Belgian First Division: 2010–2011, 2011–2012
- BeNe League: 2012–13, 2013–14, 2014–15
- Super League: 2015–2016, 2016–2017
- Belgian Cup: 2005–2006, 2011–2012, 2013–2014
- Belgian Super Cup: 2010–2011, 2011–2012
- BeNe Super Cup: 2010–2011, 2011–2012

Anderlecht

- Belgian Women's Super League: 2017–18

Individual

- Belgian First Division topscorer: 2009–2010 (35 goals), 2010–2011 (32 goals)
- Province of Luxembourg Sports Merit award: 2014
- Best Belgian Female Football Player: 2016
- Luxembourg Gouvernement Godefrois Sport: 2016
- Pro League Hall of Fame: 2024

== See also ==
- List of women's footballers with 100 or more international caps
