= Davina Philtjens =

Belgian footballer (born 1989)

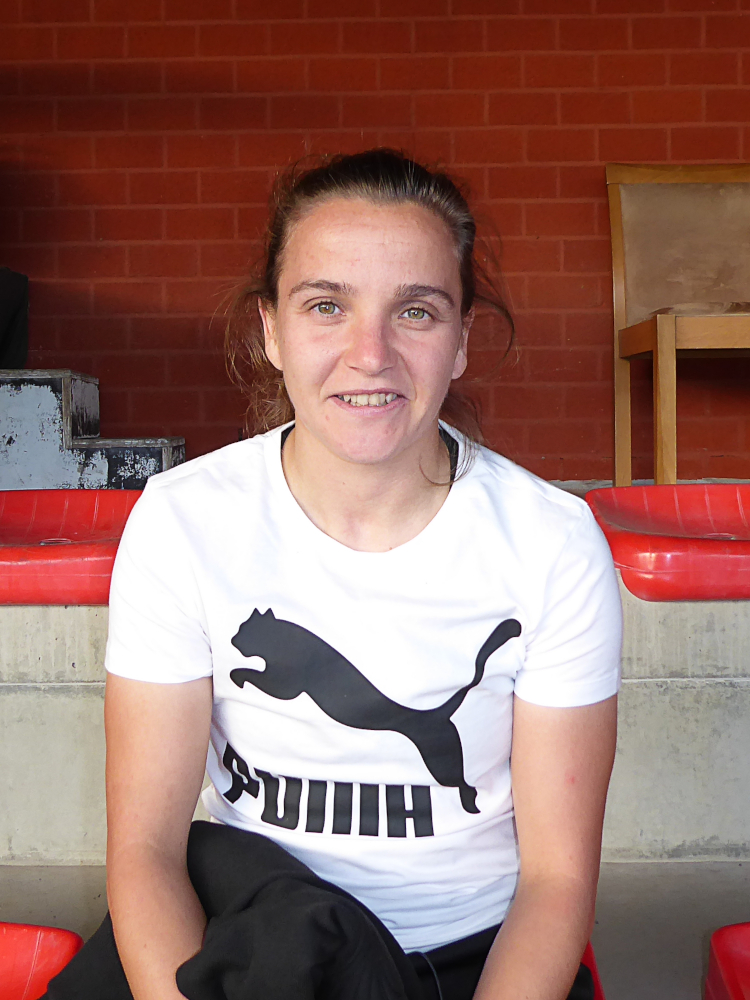
- Philtjens in 2022

Personal information
- Date of birth: 26 February 1989 (age 37)
- Place of birth: Hasselt, Belgium
- Height: 1.51 m (4 ft 11 in)
- Position: Left back

Team information
- Current team: Sassuolo
- Number: 2

Senior career*
Years	Team	Apps	(Gls)
2008–2016	Standard Liège	59	(9)
2016–2018	Ajax	45	(1)
2018–2020	Fiorentina	30	(4)
2020–	Sassuolo	111	(5)

International career^{‡}
2003–2005	Belgium U17	8	(9)
2005–2008	Belgium U19	21	(5)
2008–2025	Belgium	128	(10)
- * Club domestic league appearances and goals as of 17:09, 21 December 2025 (UTC) ‡ National team caps and goals as of 17:09, 21 December 2025 (UTC)

Davina Philtjens (born 26 February 1989) is a Belgian professional footballer who plays as a left back for Italian Serie A club US Sassuolo. From 2008 to 2025, she played for the Belgium national team, where she became the third most-capped Belgian women's player of all time.

== Club career ==
Philtjens previously played for Standard Liège in the Belgian Championship, where she won seven Belgian Super League titles and the short-lived BeNe League in 2014–15, along with two Belgian Cups in 2012 and 2014. Philtjens won a Dutch title with Ajax in the Eredivisie in 2017–18.

She subsequently was based in Italy's Serie A first with Fiorentina and then Sassuolo.

Philtjens signed for Sassuolo from Fiorentina in 2020 and celebrated her 100th game for the club in November 2024.

== International career ==
Having played 21 times for the Under-19 national side, Philtjens made her debut for Belgium at senior level in a 1–0 away win over Wales on 17 February 2008.

Philtjens played in Belgium's only two appearances at the Women's European Championships, their group stage exit at Euro 2017 where she netted in a 2–1 loss to the Netherlands, and the Red Flames' subsequent run to quarter-finals at Euro 2022, where she did not score but did help Belgium out of their group for the first time ever.

In their second appearance at the continental finals, the Red Flames finished second in Group D behind group favourites France, against whom they conceded a narrow defeat (1–2), but ahead of Iceland with a 1–1 draw and Italy, who they edged out 1–0. Belgium lost 1–0 to Sweden in the quarter-finals.

At the start of 2022, Philtjens helped Belgium win the Pinatar Cup friendly tournament in Spain for the first time, beating Russia on penalties in the final after a 0–0 draw. Philtjens missed Belgium's opening penalty of the shoot-out.

She went on to contribute to Belgium's successful qualification for UEFA Women's Euro 2025 via the play-offs, playing in all Belgium's group games, but missing out on knockout wins over Greece and Ukraine through injury. On 11 June 2025, Philtjens was called up to the Belgium squad for the UEFA Women's Euro 2025.

In October 2025, Philtjens announced her retirement from the Belgium national team after making 128 caps across 17 years.

== Career statistics ==
Appearances and goals by national team and year
National team	Year	Apps	Goals
Belgium	2008	3	0
Belgium	2010	4	3
Belgium	2011	6	0
Belgium	2012	5	0
Belgium	2013	5	1
Belgium	2014	8	0
Belgium	2015	8	0
Belgium	2016	9	2
Belgium	2017	15	2
Belgium	2018	10	0
Belgium	2019	13	2
Belgium	2020	7	0
Belgium	2021	7	0
Belgium	2022	15	0
Belgium	2023	3	0
Belgium	2024	4	0
Belgium	2025	6	0
Total		128	10

Scores and results list Belgium's goal tally first, score column indicates score after each Philtjens goal.

List of international goals scored by Davina Philtjens
No.	Date	Venue	Opponent	Score	Result	Competition
1	28 March 2010	Edmond Machtens Stadium, Brussels, Belgium	Wales	1–2	2–3	2011 FIFA Women's World Cup qualification
2	19 June 2010	Stade Leburton, Tubize, Belgium	Azerbaijan	2–0	11–0	2011 FIFA Women's World Cup qualification
3	19 June 2010	Stade Leburton, Tubize, Belgium	Azerbaijan	5–0	11–0	2011 FIFA Women's World Cup qualification
4	21 September 2013	King Baudouin Stadium, Brussels, Belgium	Albania	1–0	2–0	2015 FIFA Women's World Cup qualification
5	20 October 2016	Proximus Basecamp, Tubize, Belgium	Russia	3–0	3–0	Friendly
6	24 November 2016	Den Dreef, Leuven, Belgium	Netherlands	2–0	3–2	Friendly
7	3 March 2017	Antonis Papadopoulos Stadium, Larnaca, Cyprus	Italy	4–1	4–1	Friendly
8	19 September 2017	Den Dreef, Leuven, Belgium	Moldova	4–0	12–0	2019 FIFA Women's World Cup qualification
9	8 November 2019	Ivan Laljak-Ivić Stadium, Zaprešić, Croatia	Croatia	2–0	4–1	UEFA Women's Euro 2022 qualification
10	8 November 2019	Ivan Laljak-Ivić Stadium, Zaprešić, Croatia	Croatia	3–1	4–1	UEFA Women's Euro 2022 qualification

== Honours ==
Standard Liège

- Belgian Women's First Division: 2008–09, 2010–11, 2011–12, 2012–13, 2013–14, 2014–15, 2015–16
- Belgian Women's Cup: 2011–12, 2013–14
- BeNe Super Cup: 2011–12, 2012–13
- Belgian Women's Super Cup: 2012–13
- BeNe League: 2014–15, runner-up: 2012–13, 2013–14

Ajax

- Eredivisie: 2017–18

Belgium

- Pinatar Cup: 2022

== See also ==
- List of women's footballers with 100 or more international caps
