= Tessa Wullaert =

Belgian footballer (born 1993)

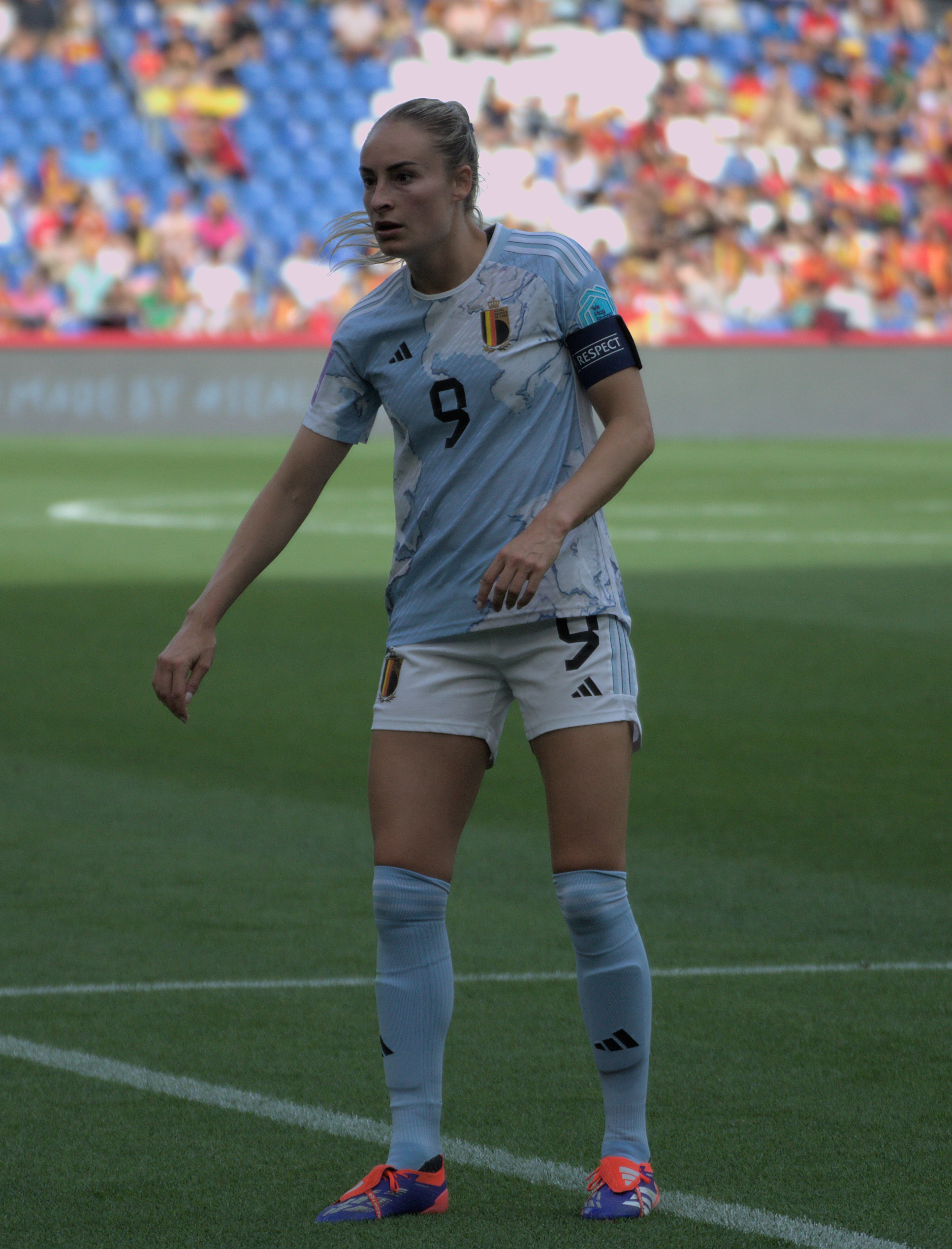
- Wullaert in 2024

Personal information
- Date of birth: 19 March 1993 (age 33)
- Place of birth: Tielt, Belgium
- Height: 1.68 m (5 ft 6 in)
- Position: Forward

Team information
- Current team: Como 1907
- Number: 33

Youth career
- FC Wakken
- Ingelmunster
- Harelbeke

Senior career*
Years	Team	Apps	(Gls)
2008–2012	Zulte Waregem		
2012–2013	Anderlecht	15	(6)
2013–2015	Standard Liège	51	(34)
2015–2018	VfL Wolfsburg	37	(7)
2018–2020	Manchester City	31	(6)
2020–2022	Anderlecht	50	(72)
2022–2024	Fortuna Sittard	42	(46)
2024–2026	Inter Milan	45	(24)
2026–	Como 1907	0	(0)

International career^{‡}
2008	Belgium U15	2	(1)
2008–2010	Belgium U17	17	(3)
2008–2011	Belgium U19	12	(7)
2011–	Belgium	160	(105)
- * Club domestic league appearances and goals as of 14 August 2026 (UTC) ‡ National team caps and goals as of 15 October 2026

Tessa Wullaert (born 19 March 1993) is a Belgian professional footballer who plays as a forward for Serie A club Como 1907 and the Belgium national team, where she has amassed the second-highest number of caps for her country ever. She is her country's highest goalscorer of all time in women's international football with 93 goals, and also holds the absolute goalscoring national record having scored more than Romelu Lukaku. Wullaert has won league titles in Belgium and Germany, plus the English FA Cup.

== Club career ==
=== Belgium ===
Wullaert's first team was SV Zulte Waregem in the Belgian First Division, where she played from 2008 to 2012. For the 2012–13 season, when the BeNe League, a new joint league between Belgium and the Netherlands, was created, she moved to RSC Anderlecht, with which she won the Belgian Cup. She left after one year and signed for Standard Liège, scoring 16 league goals during the 2013–14 season and winning the Belgian Cup again. In 2014–15, her second season playing for Standard, she won the BeNe League top scorer award with 18 goals, helping the club win the title.

=== Wolfsburg ===
In May 2015, Wullaert moved to VfL Wolfsburg. She spent three seasons with the club, winning two Bundesliga and three DFB-Pokal titles. She also appeared in two Champions League finals, both as a substitute.

=== Manchester City ===
In June 2018, Wullaert signed for English FA WSL club Manchester City. In her first season with the club, Wullaert won the FA Cup and League Cup double, finishing runner-up in the league. Following two seasons with the club, Wullaert announced she had declined a new contract and would be leaving.

=== Anderlecht ===
In 2020, Wullaert moved back to Belgium to be closer to her family and boyfriend. She signed a contract with Anderlecht that made her the only fully professional female footballer in Belgium at the time. She scored more than 30 goals in each of her two seasons with Anderlecht, leading the Women's Super League in scoring and helping Anderlecht win two league titles and the Belgian Cup in 2022.

=== Fortuna Sittard ===
After two years in her native Belgium, Wullaert agreed terms with newcomers to the Dutch Eredivisie Fortuna Sittard, situated just across the border from Belgium. In March 2024, she scored a league record of 7 goals in an 8–0 win over Telstar. With 26 goals, Wullaert became top scorer of the 2023–24 Eredivisie. She also won the league's player of the year award.

=== Inter Milan Women ===
On 7 June 2024, it was announced that Wullaert would join the Inter Milan women's team.

== International career ==
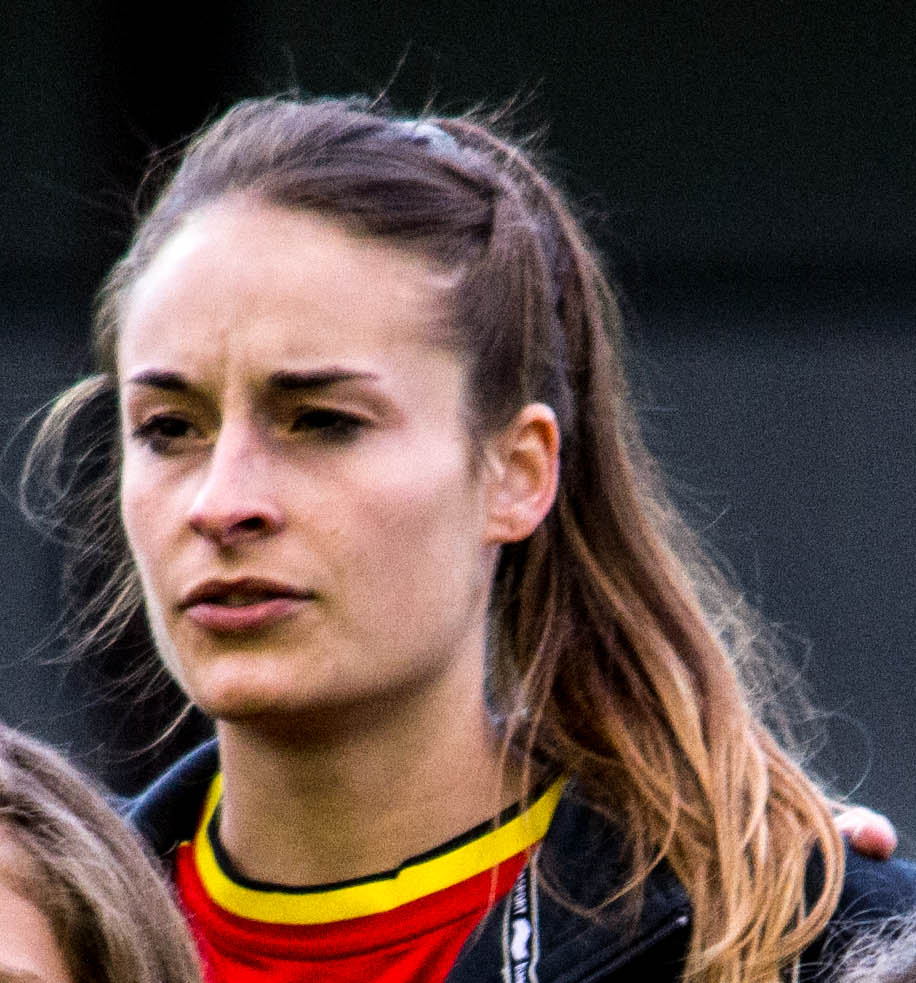
Wullaert with Belgium in 2014

Wullaert represented Belgium at the 2011 UEFA Women's U-19 Championship and in the same year made her debut for the senior national team. Within four years she achieved the record for highest number of international goals by a Belgian female football player, going level up with team captain Aline Zeler in October 2015, overtaking her in March 2016.

Wullaert played in Belgium's only two appearances at the Women's European Championships, their group stage exit at Euro 2017 where she netted in a 2–1 loss to the Netherlands, and the Red Flames' subsequent run to quarter-finals at Euro 2022, where she did not score but did help Belgium out of their group for the first time ever.

In their second appearance at the continental finals, the Red Flames finished second in Group D behind group favourites France, against whom they conceded a narrow defeat (1–2), but ahead of Iceland with a 1–1 draw and Italy, who they edged out 1–0. Belgium lost 1–0 to Sweden in the quarter-finals.

At the start of 2022, Wullaert was named in the Belgium squad for the Pinatar Cup friendly tournament in Spain but had to pull out through injury. Belgium went on to win the tournament for the first time, beating Russia on penalties after a 0–0 draw.

Wullaert's two goals against Greece in the UEFA Women's Euro 2025 qualifying play-off semi-final second leg on 29 October 2024 saw her reach 85 goals for her country, matching Romelu Lukaku's men's record to become the joint-highlest goalscorer ever for any Belgiam senior national football team.

This record came in her 137th appearance for the Red Flames, with only Janice Cayman amassing more caps (153).

Wullaert took custody of the Belgian outscoring senior reconrd again when she netted her 86th goal for the Red Flames in their 2–0 Euro 2025 play-off final first-leg win away to Ukraine on 29 November 2024, scoring the clincher in the second-leg for a 2–1 win on the night, qualifying 4–1 on aggregate.

On 11 June 2025, Wullaert was called up to the Belgium squad for the UEFA Women's Euro 2025.

On 7 March 2026, Wullaert scored her 100th international goals against Israel in 5–0 victory at 2027 FIFA Women's World Cup qualification.

Among Wullaert's record national haul of 105 goals, Wullaert has scored nine hat-tricks in her international career, including a five-goal haul in a 19–0 Women's World Cup qualifier against Armenia in 2021 and four against Greece in another qualifier in 2015.

== Career statistics ==
As of match played 5 June 2026

Scores and results list Belgium's goal tally first, score column indicates score after each Wullaert goal.

List of international goals scored by Tessa Wullaert
G	C	Date	Venue	Opponent	Score	Result	Competition
1	1	20 August 2011	Stade Armand-Melis, Dessel, Belgium	Russia	1–0	1–0	Friendly
2	2	17 September 2011	Stade Armand-Melis, Dessel, Belgium	Hungary	1–0	2–1	UEFA Women's Euro 2013 qualifying
3	5	15 February 2012	Stade Armand-Melis, Dessel, Belgium	Northern Ireland	2–1	2–2	UEFA Women's Euro 2013 qualifying
4	6	4 April 2012	Stade Armand-Melis, Dessel, Belgium	Iceland	1–0	1–0	UEFA Women's Euro 2013 qualifying
5	8	9 June 2012	Henri Houtsaegerstadion, Koksijde, Belgium	North Korea	2–2	2–2	Friendly
6	11	15 September 2012	Ullevaal Stadion, Oslo, Norway	Norway	1–2	2–3	UEFA Women's Euro 2013 qualifying
7	13	9 February 2013	Regenboogstadion, Waregem, Belgium	Netherlands	1–0	2–3	Friendly
8	14	13 February 2013	PGB-Stadion, Oostakker, Belgium	Austria	1–0	2–0	Friendly
9	15	2 June 2013	Stade Leburton, Tubize, Belgium	Ukraine	3–0	3–0	Friendly
10	19	26 October 2013	Levadia Stadium, Livadeia, Greece	Greece	4–1	7–1	2015 FIFA Women's World Cup qualification
11	19	26 October 2013	Levadia Stadium, Livadeia, Greece	Greece	7–1	7–1	2015 FIFA Women's World Cup qualification
12	20	31 October 2013	Bosuilstadion, Antwerp, Belgium	Portugal	2–1	4–1	2015 FIFA Women's World Cup qualification
13	20	31 October 2013	Bosuilstadion, Antwerp, Belgium	Portugal	4–1	4–1	2015 FIFA Women's World Cup qualification
14	23	5 April 2014	Niko Dovana Stadium, Durrës, Albania	Albania	2–0	6–0	2015 FIFA Women's World Cup qualification
15	26	13 September 2014	Stade Eneco, Leuven, Belgium	Greece	4–0	11–0	2015 FIFA Women's World Cup qualification
16	26	13 September 2014	Stade Eneco, Leuven, Belgium	Greece	6–0	11–0	2015 FIFA Women's World Cup qualification
17	26	13 September 2014	Stade Eneco, Leuven, Belgium	Greece	8–0	11–0	2015 FIFA Women's World Cup qualification
18	26	13 September 2014	Stade Eneco, Leuven, Belgium	Greece	11–0	11–0	2015 FIFA Women's World Cup qualification
19	27	17 September 2014	Estádio Municipal de Abrantes, Abrantes, Portugal	Portugal	1–0	1–0	2015 FIFA Women's World Cup qualification
20	28	22 November 2014	Stadion Ludowy, Sosnowiec, Poland	Poland	1–0	4–0	Friendly
21	29	11 February 2015	Estadio José Antonio Pérez, San Pedro del Pinatar, Spain	Spain	1–0	1–2	Friendly
22	30	3 March 2015	Paralimni Stadium, Paralimni, Cyprus	Czech Republic	2–2	2–2	2015 Cyprus Cup
23	34	23 May 2015	Stayen, Sint-Truiden, Belgium	Norway	3–2	3–2	Friendly
24	37	27 October 2015	Bilino Polje Stadium, Zenica, Bosnia and Herzegovina	Bosnia and Herzegovina	3–0	5–0	UEFA Women's Euro 2017 qualifying
25	37	27 October 2015	Bilino Polje Stadium, Zenica, Bosnia and Herzegovina	Bosnia and Herzegovina	4–0	5–0	UEFA Women's Euro 2017 qualifying
26	42	9 March 2016	Complexo Desportivo de VRSA, Vila Real de Santo António, Portugal	Russia	1–0	5–0	2016 Algarve Cup
27	44	12 April 2016	Stade Eneco, Leuven, Belgium	Estonia	3–0	6–0	UEFA Women's Euro 2017 qualifying
28	44	12 April 2016	Stade Eneco, Leuven, Belgium	Estonia	5–0	6–0	UEFA Women's Euro 2017 qualifying
29	52	3 March 2017	AEK Arena, Larnaca, Cyprus	Italy	1–1	4–1	2017 Cyprus Women's Cup
30	54	8 March 2017	AEK Arena, Larnaca, Cyprus	Austria	1–0	1–1	2017 Cyprus Women's Cup
31	56	11 April 2017	Stade Eneco, Leuven, Belgium	Scotland	3–0	5–0	Friendly
32	60	11 July 2017	Van Roystadion, Denderleeuw, Belgium	Russia	1–0	2–0	Friendly
33	63	24 July 2017	Koning Willem II Stadion, Tilburg, Netherlands	Netherlands	1–1	1–2	UEFA Women's Euro 2017
34	64	19 September 2017	Stade Eneco, Leuven, Belgium	Moldova	2–0	12–0	2019 FIFA Women's World Cup qualification
35	64	19 September 2017	Stade Eneco, Leuven, Belgium	Moldova	3–0	12–0	2019 FIFA Women's World Cup qualification
36	64	19 September 2017	Stade Eneco, Leuven, Belgium	Moldova	5–0	12–0	2019 FIFA Women's World Cup qualification
37	65	20 October 2017	Stade Eneco, Leuven, Belgium	Romania	1–0	3–2	2019 FIFA Women's World Cup qualification
38	69	7 March 2018	GSZ Stadium, Larnaca, Cyprus	South Africa	1–1	2–1	2018 Cyprus Cup
39	72	20 June 2018	Zimbru Stadium, Chișinău, Moldova	Moldova	6–0	7–0	2019 FIFA Women's World Cup qualification
40	81	24 May 2019	Municipal Pylos Stadium, Pylos, Greece	Greece	2–0	2–1	Friendly
41	82	1 June 2019	Stade Eneco, Leuven, Belgium	Thailand	2–0	6–1	Friendly
42	86	8 November 2019	Ivan Laljak-Ivić Stadium, Zaprešić, Croatia	Croatia	1–0	4–1	UEFA Women's Euro 2022 qualifying
43	91	18 September 2020	Den Dreef, Leuven, Belgium	Romania	1–0	6–1	UEFA Women's Euro 2022 qualifying
44	91	18 September 2020	Den Dreef, Leuven, Belgium	Romania	3–0	6–1	UEFA Women's Euro 2022 qualifying
45	91	18 September 2020	Den Dreef, Leuven, Belgium	Romania	4–0	6–1	UEFA Women's Euro 2022 qualifying
46	92	22 September 2020	Stockhorn Arena, Thun, Switzerland	Switzerland	1–2	1–2	UEFA Women's Euro 2022 qualifying
47	93	27 October 2020	Sūduva Stadium, Marijampolė, Lithuania	Lithuania	1–0	9–0	UEFA Women's Euro 2022 qualifying
48	93	27 October 2020	Sūduva Stadium, Marijampolė, Lithuania	Lithuania	7–0	9–0	UEFA Women's Euro 2022 qualifying
49	93	27 October 2020	Sūduva Stadium, Marijampolė, Lithuania	Lithuania	8–0	9–0	UEFA Women's Euro 2022 qualifying
50	94	1 December 2020	Den Dreef, Leuven, Belgium	Switzerland	3–0	4–0	UEFA Women's Euro 2022 qualifying
51	100	21 September 2021	King Baudouin Stadium, Brussels, Belgium	Albania	6–0	7–0	2023 FIFA Women's World Cup qualification
52	101	21 October 2021	Den Dreef, Leuven, Belgium	Kosovo	3–0	7–0	2023 FIFA Women's World Cup qualification
53	101	21 October 2021	Den Dreef, Leuven, Belgium	Kosovo	6–0	7–0	2023 FIFA Women's World Cup qualification
54	101	21 October 2021	Den Dreef, Leuven, Belgium	Kosovo	7–0	7–0	2023 FIFA Women's World Cup qualification
55	103	25 November 2021	Den Dreef, Leuven, Belgium	Armenia	2–0	19–0	2023 FIFA Women's World Cup qualification
56	103	25 November 2021	Den Dreef, Leuven, Belgium	Armenia	10–0	19–0	2023 FIFA Women's World Cup qualification
57	103	25 November 2021	Den Dreef, Leuven, Belgium	Armenia	12–0	19–0	2023 FIFA Women's World Cup qualification
58	103	25 November 2021	Den Dreef, Leuven, Belgium	Armenia	17–0	19–0	2023 FIFA Women's World Cup qualification
59	103	25 November 2021	Den Dreef, Leuven, Belgium	Armenia	18–0	19–0	2023 FIFA Women's World Cup qualification
60	105	7 April 2022	Elbasan Arena, Elbasan, Albania	Albania	2–0	5–0	2023 FIFA Women's World Cup qualification
61	105	7 April 2022	Elbasan Arena, Elbasan, Albania	Albania	4–0	5–0	2023 FIFA Women's World Cup qualification
62	106	12 April 2022	Fadil Vokrri Stadium, Pristina, Kosovo	Kosovo	2–0	6–1	2023 FIFA Women's World Cup qualification
63	106	12 April 2022	Fadil Vokrri Stadium, Pristina, Kosovo	Kosovo	3–0	6–1	2023 FIFA Women's World Cup qualification
64	106	12 April 2022	Fadil Vokrri Stadium, Pristina, Kosovo	Kosovo	4–0	6–1	2023 FIFA Women's World Cup qualification
65	106	12 April 2022	Fadil Vokrri Stadium, Pristina, Kosovo	Kosovo	5–0	6–1	2023 FIFA Women's World Cup qualification
66	108	23 June 2022	Herman Vanderpoortenstadion, Lier, Belgium	Northern Ireland	1–0	3–1	Friendly
67	108	23 June 2022	Herman Vanderpoortenstadion, Lier, Belgium	Northern Ireland	3–1	3–1	Friendly
68	115	6 September 2022	Yerevan Football Academy Stadium, Yerevan, Armenia	Armenia	4–0	7–0	2023 FIFA Women's World Cup qualification
69	116	6 October 2022	Estádio do FC Vizela, Vizela, Portugal	Portugal	1–1	2–1	2023 FIFA WC Qualy play-offs
70	117	13 November 2022	Joseph Marien Stadium, Brussels, Belgium	Slovakia	3–0	7–0	Friendly
71	117	13 November 2022	Joseph Marien Stadium, Brussels, Belgium	Slovakia	6–0	7–0	Friendly
72	118	16 February 2023	Stadium MK, Milton Keynes, England	Italy	2–1	2–1	2023 Arnold Clark Cup
73	119	19 February 2023	Coventry Building Society Arena, Coventry, England	South Korea	1–1	2–1	2023 Arnold Clark Cup
74	121	11 April 2023	Den Dreef, Leuven, Belgium	Slovenia	1–1	2–2	Friendly
75	121	11 April 2023	Den Dreef, Leuven, Belgium	Slovenia	2–1	2–2	Friendly
76	125	31 October 2023	Den Dreef, Leuven, Belgium	England	2–2	3–2	2023–24 UEFA Women's Nations League
77	125	31 October 2023	Den Dreef, Leuven, Belgium	England	3–2	3–2	2023–24 UEFA Women's Nations League
78	128	23 February 2024	Pancho Aréna, Felcsút, Hungary	Hungary	2–1	5–1	2023–24 UEFA Women's Nations League play-offs
79	128	23 February 2024	Pancho Aréna, Felcsút, Hungary	Hungary	4–1	5–1	2023–24 UEFA Women's Nations League play-offs
80	129	27 February 2024	Den Dreef, Leuven, Belgium	Hungary	1–1	5–1	2023–24 UEFA Women's Nations League play-offs
81	129	27 February 2024	Den Dreef, Leuven, Belgium	Hungary	2–1	5–1	2023–24 UEFA Women's Nations League play-offs
82	129	27 February 2024	Den Dreef, Leuven, Belgium	Hungary	3–1	5–1	2023–24 UEFA Women's Nations League play-offs
83	132	31 May 2024	Eden Arena, Prague, Czech Republic	Czech Republic	1–0	2–1	UEFA Women's Euro 2025 qualifying
84	137	29 October 2024	Den Dreef, Leuven, Belgium	Greece	2–0	5–0	UEFA Women's Euro 2025 qualifying play-offs
85	137	29 October 2024	Den Dreef, Leuven, Belgium	Greece	3–0	5–0	UEFA Women's Euro 2025 qualifying play-offs
86	138	29 November 2024	Mardan Sports Complex, Antalya, Turkey	Ukraine	2–0	2–0	UEFA Women's Euro 2025 qualifying play-offs
87	139	3 December 2024	Den Dreef, Leuven, Belgium	Ukraine	2–1	2–1	UEFA Women's Euro 2025 qualifying play-offs
88	140	21 February 2025	Estadi Ciutat de València, Valencia, Spain	Spain	2–0	2–3	2025 UEFA Women's Nations League
89	142	8 April 2025	Den Dreef, Leuven, Belgium	England	1–0	3–2	2025 UEFA Women's Nations League
90	142	8 April 2025	Den Dreef, Leuven, Belgium	England	3–0	3–2	2025 UEFA Women's Nations League
91	144	3 June 2025	Estádio do Marítimo, Funchal, Portugal	Portugal	2–0	3–0	2025 UEFA Women's Nations League
92	144	3 June 2025	Estádio do Marítimo, Funchal, Portugal	Portugal	3–0	3–0	2025 UEFA Women's Nations League
93	146	26 June 2025	Edmond Machtens Stadium, Brussels, Belgium	Greece	1–0	2–0	Friendly
94	149	11 July 2025	Stade de Tourbillon, Sion, Switzerland	Portugal	1–0	2–1	UEFA Women's Euro 2025
95	150	24 October 2025	Aviva Stadium, Dublin, Ireland	Republic of Ireland	1–1	2–4	2025 UEFA Women's Nations League play-offs
96	151	28 October 2025	Den Dreef, Leuven, Belgium	Republic of Ireland	1–0	2–1	2025 UEFA Women's Nations League play-offs
97	151	28 October 2025	Den Dreef, Leuven, Belgium	Republic of Ireland	2–0	2–1	2025 UEFA Women's Nations League play-offs
98	153	3 March 2026	BSC Stadium, Budaörs, Hungary	Israel	1–0	3–0	2027 FIFA Women's World Cup qualification
99	154	7 March 2026	BSC Stadium, Budaörs, Hungary	Israel	1–0	5–0	2027 FIFA Women's World Cup qualification
100	154	7 March 2026	BSC Stadium, Budaörs, Hungary	Israel	2–0	5–0	2027 FIFA Women's World Cup qualification
101	154	7 March 2026	BSC Stadium, Budaörs, Hungary	Israel	4–0	5–0	2027 FIFA Women's World Cup qualification
102	157	5 June 2026	Den Dreef, Leuven, Belgium	Luxembourg	2–0	6–0	2027 FIFA Women's World Cup qualification
103	157	5 June 2026	Den Dreef, Leuven, Belgium	Luxembourg	3–0	6–0	2027 FIFA Women's World Cup qualification
104	157	5 June 2026	Den Dreef, Leuven, Belgium	Luxembourg	4–0	6–0	2027 FIFA Women's World Cup qualification
105	158	9 June 2026	Stade de la Frontière, Esch-sur-Alzette, Luxembourg	Luxembourg	1–0	7–0	2027 FIFA Women's World Cup qualification

== Honours ==
Zulte Waregem

- Belgian Women's Second Division: 2008–09

Anderlecht

- Belgian Women's Super League: 2021, 2022
- Belgian Women's Cup: 2013, 2022

Standard Liège

- BeNe League: 2014–15
- Belgian Women's Cup: 2014

VfL Wolfsburg

- DFB-Pokal: 2015–16, 2016–17, 2017–18
- Bundesliga: 2016–17, 2017–18
- UEFA Women's Champions League runner-up: 2015–16, 2017–18

Manchester City

- FA Women's League Cup: 2018–19
- FA Cup: 2018–19

Inter Milan

- Serie A runner-up: 2025–26

Belgium

- Pinatar Cup: 2022

Individual

- BeNe League topscorer: 2014–15
- BeNe League player of the season: 2014–15
- The Sparkle: 2015
- Belgian Golden Shoe: 2016, 2018, 2019, 2023, 2024, 2025
- Super League topscorer: 2020–21, 2021–22
- Belgian Professional Footballer of the Year: 2021–22
- Record of most goals in 1 Eredivisie-game (7): 2024
- Eredivisie top scorer: 2023–24
- Eredivisie Player of the Year: 2023–24
- Honorary Citizen of Harelbeke, Belgium: 2024
- Belgium women's record goalscorer: 75 goals
- Serie A top scorer: 2025–26
- Serie A Best Forward: 2025–26
- Serie A Team of the Season: 2025–26
- Ballon d'Or Féminin nomination: 2026

== See also ==
- List of women's footballers with 100 or more international goals
- List of women's footballers with 100 or more international caps
