= 2011–12 Belgian First Division (women's football) =

Women's First Division
- Season: 2011–12
- Champions: Standard Fémina de Liège
- UEFA Women's Champions League: Standard Fémina de Liège
- Matches: 182
- Goals: 708 (3.89 per match)

The 2011-12 Belgian First Division season in women's football was the final season of the Belgian Women's First Division. The league involved 14 clubs, with two teams promoted from the Second Division: K. Achterbroek VV and KSK Heist.

Standard Fémina de Liège, the defending champion, won the league's final title.

The national federations of Belgium and the Netherlands folded their top women's divisions into the binational BeNe League; after receiving UEFA approval, the new league played its first season in 2012–13.

== Teams ==
Location of teams in the First Division 2011-12

1 Standard Fémina de Liège; 2 RSC Anderlecht;
3 WD Lierse SK; 4 WB Sinaai Girls;
5 SV Zulte Waregem; 6 Oud-Heverlee Leuven;
7 DVC Eva's Tienen; 8 GBA-Kontich FC;
9 Club Brugge Dames; 10 FC Fémina White Star Woluwe;
11 K. Sint-Truidense VV; 12 DVC Zuid-West-Vlaanderen;
13 KSK Heist; 14 K. Achterbroek VV

| Team | Home city | Home ground |
|---|---|---|
| Standard Fémina de Liège | Liège | Stade Standard de Liège |
| RSC Anderlecht | Anderlecht | Koning Boudewijnstadion |
| WD Lierse SK | Lier | |
| WB Sinaai Girls | Sinaai | |
| SV Zulte Waregem | Zulte | Gemeentelijk Sportstadion Zulte |
| Oud-Heverlee Leuven | Heverlee | Gemeentelijk Stadion |
| DVC Eva's Tienen | Kumtich | Sint-Barbaracomplex |
| GBA-Kontich FC | Kontich | |
| Club Brugge Dames | Bruges | |
| FC Fémina White Star Woluwe | Woluwe-Saint-Lambert | Stade Fallon |
| K. Sint-Truidense VV | Sint-Truiden | Stayen |
| DVC Zuid-West-Vlaanderen | Harelbeke | Forestiersstadion |
| K. Achterbroek VV | Kalmthout | |
| KSK Heist | Heist-op-den-Berg | Gemeentelijk Sportcentrum |

== Standings ==
| Pos | Team | Pld | W | D | L | GF | GA | GD | Pts | Qualification or relegation |
|---|---|---|---|---|---|---|---|---|---|---|
| 1 | Standard Fémina de Liège (C) | 26 | 23 | 1 | 2 | 134 | 17 | +117 | 70 | 2012–13 UEFA Women's Champions League |
| 2 | RSC Anderlecht | 26 | 20 | 3 | 3 | 86 | 23 | +63 | 63 | |
| 3 | WD Lierse SK | 26 | 17 | 5 | 4 | 82 | 29 | +53 | 56 | |
| 4 | K. Sint-Truidense VV | 26 | 13 | 7 | 6 | 48 | 29 | +19 | 46 | |
| 5 | Sinaai Girls | 26 | 14 | 1 | 11 | 51 | 43 | +8 | 43 | |
| 6 | DVC Eva's Tienen | 26 | 12 | 4 | 10 | 42 | 44 | −2 | 40 | |
| 7 | SV Zulte Waregem | 26 | 11 | 5 | 10 | 44 | 34 | +10 | 38 | |
| 8 | Club Brugge Dames | 26 | 10 | 7 | 9 | 37 | 40 | −3 | 37 | |
| 9 | Oud-Heverlee Leuven | 26 | 8 | 10 | 8 | 32 | 38 | −6 | 34 | |
| 10 | GBA-Kontich FC | 26 | 9 | 2 | 15 | 38 | 49 | −11 | 29 | |
| 11 | KSK Heist | 26 | 5 | 8 | 13 | 34 | 66 | −32 | 23 | |
| 12 | FC Fémina White Star Woluwe | 26 | 5 | 4 | 17 | 37 | 67 | −30 | 19 | |
| 13 | K. Achterbroek VV | 26 | 4 | 2 | 20 | 30 | 78 | −48 | 14 | Qualification for Relegation Playoffs |
| 14 | DVC Zuid-West-Vlaanderen | 26 | 1 | 1 | 24 | 13 | 151 | −138 | 4 | Relegation to 2012–13 First Division (Women) |

Updated to match(es) played on 23 May 2012. Source: nl.women.soccerway.com
Rules for classification: 1) points; 2) goal difference; 3) number of goals scored.
(C) Champions
