= 2012–13 BeNe League =

Women's BeNe League
- Season: 2012/13
- Champions: FC Twente
- UEFA Women's Champions League: Standard Fémina; FC Twente
- Matches: 224
- Goals: 796 (3.55 per match)
- Top goalscorer: Vivianne Miedema (27)
- Biggest home win: Zwolle 8-1 Zulte-Waregem
- Biggest away win: Zulte-Waregem 1-9 Anderlecht
- Highest scoring: Zulte-Waregem 1-9 Anderlecht

The 2012–13 season of the Women's BeNe League was the first season of the Belgium and the Netherlands' women's football top level league. Since this was the first season, the league had no reigning champion, although both countries had reigning champions from their former top leagues—Standard Liège in Belgium and ADO Den Haag in the Netherlands. The season started on 24 August 2012. The championship was won by FC Twente.

== Format ==
The season began with a national phase, involving eight teams in each nation. The teams then played a double round-robin, resulting in 14 matches per team. The best four teams from each nation then qualified for the BeNe League A. The other teams joined the BeNe League B. The best team of each country in League A qualified for the 2013–14 UEFA Women's Champions League.

== Teams ==
Teams were required to apply for league places. In Belgium, 11 teams asked for a license, and nine teams got a license. Dutch teams had until 31 May 2011 to apply. On 5 June, the KNVB announced that nine Dutch teams would join the BeNe league. On 11 June, VVV-Venlo decided with FCE/PSV to withdraw from the BeNe League.

BeNe League Teams for 2013-2014

Team	Country	Home city	Home ground
Standard Fémina de Liège	Belgium	Liège	Complexe Standard de Liège
RSC Anderlecht	Belgium	Anderlecht	RSCA Football Academy
WD Lierse SK	Belgium	Lier	Herman Vanderpoortenstadion
K. St-Truidense VV	Belgium	Sint-Truiden	Stayen
Dames SV Zulte-Waregem	Belgium	Zulte	Gemeentelijk Sportstadion
Club Brugge Dames	Belgium	Bruges	Olympiapark
Oud-Heverlee Leuven	Belgium	Heverlee	Gemeentelijk Stadion
Beerschot AD	Belgium	Antwerpen	Stadion FC Kontich
ADO Den Haag	Netherlands	Den Haag	Kyocera Stadion
FC Twente	Netherlands	Enschede	De Grolsch Veste
Telstar	Netherlands	Velsen	TATA Steel Stadion
FC Utrecht	Netherlands	Utrecht	Sportpark Maarschalkerweerd (Kampong)
PEC Zwolle	Netherlands	Zwolle	IJsseldelta Stadion
SC Heerenveen	Netherlands	Heerenveen	Sportpark Skoatterwâld
AFC Ajax	Netherlands	Amsterdam	Sportpark De Toekomst
PSV/FC Eindhoven	Netherlands	Eindhoven	Jan Louwers Stadion

== First stage ==
=== BeNe League Red (Belgium) ===
Pos	Team	Pld	W	D	L	GF	GA	GD	Pts	Qualification
1	(Belgium) Standard Fémina	14	13	0	1	40	6	+34	39	BeNe League A
2	(Belgium) Anderlecht Féminin	14	8	1	5	43	21	+22	25	BeNe League A
3	(Belgium) WD Lierse	14	7	2	5	26	14	+12	23	BeNe League A
4	(Belgium) Beerschot	14	6	3	5	21	17	+4	21	BeNe League A
5	(Belgium) Sint-Truiden	14	6	2	6	25	19	+6	20	BeNe League B
6	(Belgium) Club Brugge	14	5	3	6	23	35	−12	18	BeNe League B
7	(Belgium) OH Leuven	14	4	1	9	10	34	−24	13	BeNe League B
8	(Belgium) Zulte-Waregem	14	1	0	13	11	53	−42	3	BeNe League B

Updated to match(es) played on 22 December 2012. Source: vrouwenvoetbalnederland.nl - BNL Red & Soccerway - BNL Red
Rules for classification: 1) points; 2) number of wins; 3) goal difference; 4) number of goals scored

Home \ Away	AND	BAC	CLU	OHL	LIE	STR	STA	ZWA
Anderlecht Féminin		3–2	2–4	4–1	0–2	1–1	1–2	7–1
Beerschot	0–3		3–3	0–1	1–0	0–1	0–1	3–0
Club Brugge	0–5	0–0		1–1	0–2	4–3	1–4	3–2
OH Leuven	1–4	0–4	2–1		1–0	1–3	0–5	0–1
WD Lierse	1–2	2–2	7–0	2–1		1–1	1–2	6–2
Sint-Truiden	3–2	1–2	0–2	4–0	0–1		0–2	6–0
Standard Fémina	2–0	1–2	2–1	5–0	2–0	2–0		6–0
Zulte-Waregem	1–9	1–2	2–3	0–1	0–1	1–2	0–4	

Updated to match(es) played on 22 December 2012. Source: vrouwenvoetbalnederland.nl - BNL Red & Soccerway - BNL Red (in Dutch)
Legend: Blue = home team win; Yellow = draw; Red = away team win.

=== BeNe League Orange (Netherlands) ===
Pos	Team	Pld	W	D	L	GF	GA	GD	Pts	Qualification
1	(Netherlands) Twente	14	10	4	0	30	12	+18	34	BeNe League A
2	(Netherlands) ADO Den Haag	14	9	2	3	33	19	+14	29	BeNe League A
3	(Netherlands) PSV/FC Eindhoven	14	6	5	3	24	21	+3	23	BeNe League A
4	(Netherlands) Ajax	14	6	3	5	25	20	+5	21	BeNe League A
5	(Netherlands) Telstar	14	5	3	6	21	17	+4	18	BeNe League B
6	(Netherlands) PEC Zwolle	14	4	2	8	23	37	−14	14	BeNe League B
7	(Netherlands) Utrecht	14	2	4	8	14	28	−14	10	BeNe League B
8	(Netherlands) Heerenveen	14	0	5	9	13	29	−16	5	BeNe League B

Updated to match(es) played on 21 December 2012. Source: vrouwenvoetbalnederland.nl - BNL Orange & Soccerway - BNL Orange
Rules for classification: 1) points; 2) number of wins; 3) goal difference; 4) number of goals scored

Home \ Away	ADO	AJX	P/F	HEE	TEL	TWE	UTR	ZWO
ADO Den Haag		2–1	0–3	3–1	2–1	2–2	4–0	4–2
Ajax	1–2		2–2	2–0	2–3	2–2	2–1	3–0
PSV/FC Eindhoven	1–3	3–2		1–1	1–0	1–1	2–1	4–0
Heerenveen	1–1	1–2	1–1		0–2	0–0	3–3	0–2
Telstar	1–4	1–2	0–0	2–1		0–1	0–0	7–0
Twente	2–1	2–1	5–1	2–1	1–0		2–0	3–1
Utrecht	0–3	1–3	0–2	3–1	2–2	0–2		1–0
PEC Zwolle	3–2	0–0	5–2	5–2	1–2	2–5	2–2	

Updated to match(es) played on 21 December 2012. Source: vrouwenvoetbalnederland.nl - BNL Orange & Soccerway - BNL Orange (in Dutch)
Legend: Blue = home team win; Yellow = draw; Red = away team win.

== Second stage ==
=== BeNe League A ===
Standard has secured the Champions League spot as best placed Belgium team.

Pos	Team	Pld	W	D	L	GF	GA	GD	Pts	Qualification
1	(Netherlands) Twente (C)	14	11	0	3	40	10	+30	33	Qualification to Champions League (Note: The highest-ranking Belgian team and the highest-ranking Dutch team qualify for the Champions League.)
2	(Belgium) Standard Fémina	14	9	4	1	34	11	+23	31	Qualification to Champions League
3	(Netherlands) PSV/FC Eindhoven	14	7	5	2	22	11	+11	26	
4	(Netherlands) Ajax	14	6	3	5	22	16	+6	21	
5	(Netherlands) ADO Den Haag	14	6	3	5	14	17	−3	21	
6	(Belgium) WD Lierse	14	4	4	6	17	25	−8	16	
7	(Belgium) Anderlecht Féminin	14	1	3	10	13	35	−22	6	
8	(Belgium) Beerschot	14	0	2	12	8	45	−37	2	

Updated to match(es) played on 26 May 2013. Source: women.soccerway.com
Rules for classification: 1) points; 2) number of wins; 3) goal difference; 4) number of goals scored
Notes:

Home \ Away	ADO	AJX	AND	BAC	P/F	LIE	STA	TWE
ADO Den Haag		2–1	3–0	1–0	0–0	1–1	0–3	1–5
Ajax	2–1		0–0	2–0	1–2	5–0	0–4	0–1
Anderlecht Féminin	0–2	1–4		4–2	1–1	2–4	1–2	1–3
Beerschot	0–0	2–4	1–1		2–5	0–2	0–6	0–3
PSV/FC Eindhoven	1–0	1–1	4–1	2–0		3–0	1–1	1–0
WD Lierse	0–1	0–1	2–1	4–1	0–0		1–1	1–4
Standard Fémina	3–0	1–1	1–0	4–0	2–1	2–2		3–1
Twente	1–2	1–0	6–0	7–0	2–0	3–0	3–1	

Updated to match(es) played on 26 May 2013. Source: vrouwenvoetbalnederland.nl - BNL A & Soccerway - BNL A (in Dutch)
Legend: Blue = home team win; Yellow = draw; Red = away team win.

=== BeNe League B ===
Pos	Team	Pld	W	D	L	GF	GA	GD	Pts
1	(Netherlands) Telstar	14	11	1	2	50	12	+38	34
2	(Netherlands) PEC Zwolle	14	11	1	2	52	21	+31	34
3	(Netherlands) Heerenveen	14	9	1	4	42	21	+21	28
4	(Netherlands) Utrecht	14	7	0	7	34	27	+7	21
5	(Belgium) OH Leuven	14	5	4	5	18	23	−5	19
6	(Belgium) Sint-Truiden	14	6	0	8	28	32	−4	18
7	(Belgium) Zulte-Waregem	14	1	2	11	11	55	−44	5
8	(Belgium) Club Brugge	14	1	1	12	9	53	−44	4

Updated to match(es) played on 26 May 2013. Source: women.soccerway.com
Rules for classification: 1) points; 2) number of wins; 3) goal difference; 4) number of goals scored

Home \ Away	CLU	HEE	OHL	STR	TEL	UTR	ZWA	ZWO
Club Brugge		3–4	0–4	1–4	0–6	0–1	1–0	0–7
Heerenveen	5–1		1–1	3–4	3–1	3–1	5–0	3–1
OH Leuven	2–0	0–1		1–0	3–3	2–1	4–2	1–1
Sint-Truiden	3–1	0–3	1–0		1–3	1–7	4–0	2–3
Telstar	7–0	3–1	3–0	2–1		1–0	4–0	5–0
Utrecht	3–1	3–2	5–0	4–1	0–5		1–2	2–4
Zulte-Waregem	0–0	1–7	0–0	0–5	1–6	2–5		2–5
PEC Zwolle	7–1	2–1	5–0	4–1	2–1	3–1	8–1	

Updated to match(es) played on 19 May 2013. Source: vrouwenvoetbalnederland.nl - BNL B & Soccerway - BNL B (in Dutch)
Legend: Blue = home team win; Yellow = draw; Red = away team win.

== Topscorers ==
Below are the scorers of the single stages. There was no official top-scorer award given this year.

=== First stage ===
BeNe League Orange
Pos.	Player	Club	Goals
1	(Netherlands) Renate Jansen	ADO Den Haag	10
2	(Netherlands) Danielle van de Donk	FCE/PSV	8
2	(Netherlands) Desiree van Lunteren	AFC Ajax	8
2	(Netherlands) Lisanne Vermeulen	PEC Zwolle	8
5	(Netherlands) Anouk Dekker	Twente	7
5	(Netherlands) Sheila van den Bulk	ADO Den Haag	7
5	(Netherlands) Mandy Versteegt	AFC Ajax	7
8	(Netherlands) Maayke Heuver	Twente	6
8	(Netherlands) Marianne van Brummelen	PEC Zwolle	6
10	(Netherlands) Vivianne Miedema	SC Heerenveen	5
10	(Netherlands) Sylvia Smit	PEC Zwolle	5
10	(Netherlands) Sherida Spitse	Twente	5
13	7 players		4
20	7 players		3
27	14 players		2
41	22 players		1
Total:			183
Games:			56
Average:			3.27

Updated to games played on 21 December 2012
Source: uk.women.soccerway.com

BeNe League Red
Pos.	Player	Club	Goals
1	(Belgium) Stephanie van Gils	Anderlecht Féminin	17
2	(Belgium) Elke Meers	Sint-Truiden	8
3	(Belgium) Lotte Aertsen	WD Lierse	7
3	(Belgium) Kristien Elsen	Sint-Truiden	7
3	(Belgium) Riana Nainggolan	Beerschot	7
3	(Belgium) Lenie Onzia	WD Lierse	7
3	(Netherlands) Marte van de Wouw	Beerschot	7
3	(Belgium) Anaelle Wiard	Anderlecht Féminin	7
3	(Belgium) Aline Zeler	Standard Fémina	7
10	(Belgium) Maud Coutereels	Standard Fémina	6
10	(Belgium) Cécile de Gernier	Standard Fémina	6
10	(Belgium) Angélique de Wulf	Club Brugge	6
10	(Netherlands) Vanity Lewerissa	Standard Fémina	6
10	(Belgium) Tessa Wullaert	Anderlecht Féminin	6
15	1 players		5
16	6 players		4
22	6 players		3
28	13 players		2
41	21 players		1
Total:			199
Games:			56
Average:			3.55

Updated to games played on 22 December 2012
Source: uk.women.soccerway.com

=== Second stage ===
BeNe League A
Pos.	Player	Club	Goals
1	(Netherlands) Sherida Spitse	FC Twente	11
2	(Belgium) Aline Zeler	Standard Fémina	10
3	(Netherlands) Ellen Jansen	FC Twente	9
4	(Belgium) Lotte Aertsen	WD Lierse	8
5	(Netherlands) Chantal de Ridder	AFC Ajax	7
6	(Netherlands) Marlous Pieëte	FC Twente	6
6	(Netherlands) Danielle van de Donk	PSV / FC Eindhoven	6
6	(Netherlands) Mauri van de Wetering	PSV / FC Eindhoven	6
9	(Netherlands) Anouk Dekker	FC Twente	5
9	(Netherlands) Renate Jansen	ADO Den Haag	5
9	(Belgium) Stephanie van Gils	Anderlecht Féminin	5
12	6 players		4
18	3 players		3
21	16 players		2
37	25 players		1
Total:			170
Games:			56
Average:			3.04

Updated to games played on 27 May 2013
Source: uk.women.soccerway.com

BeNe League B
Pos.	Player	Club	Goals
1	(Netherlands) Vivianne Miedema	SC Heerenveen	22
2	(Netherlands) Sylvia Smit	PEC Zwolle	12
3	(Netherlands) Lisanne Vermeulen	PEC Zwolle	11
4	(Netherlands) Priscilla de Vos	Telstar	10
4	(Netherlands) Tessa Oudejans	FC Utrecht	10
6	(France) Pauline Crammer	Zulte-Waregem	8
6	(Netherlands) Kristien Elsen	Sint Truiden	8
6	(Netherlands) Judith Frijlink	PEC Zwolle	8
6	(Belgium) Elke Meers	Sint Truiden	8
6	(Netherlands) Marianne van Brummelen	PEC Zwolle	8
11	2 players		7
13	4 players		6
16	1 players		5
17	4 players		4
22	8 players		3
30	11 players		2
41	30 players		1
Total:			244
Games:			56
Average:			4.36

Updated to games played on 26 May 2013
Source: uk.women.soccerway.com
