= 2010–11 Belgian First Division (women's football) =

Women's First Division
- Season: 2010–11
- Champions: Standard Fémina de Liège
- Relegated: DV Famkes Merkem; Miecroob Veltem
- UEFA Women's Champions League: Standard Fémina de Liège
- Matches: 182
- Goals: 714 (3.92 per match)
- Biggest home win: Liège 12-0 Merkem
- Biggest away win: Merkem 1-14 Liège
- Highest scoring: Merkem 1-14 Liège

In the Season 2010-11 of the First Division 14 clubs played in the competition. Two teams promoted from the Second Division, these were GBA-Kontich FC and Miecroob Veltem.

K. Sint-Truidense VV were the defending champions. Standard Fémina de Liège won the championship and qualified for the UEFA Women's Champions League.

DV Famkes Merkem and Miecroob Veltem relegated to the Second Division and shall not return in the First Division the next season.

== Teams ==
Location of teams in the First Division 2010-11

1 Standard Fémina de Liège; 2 RSC Anderlecht;
3 WD Lierse SK; 4 WB Sinaai Girls;
5 SV Zulte Waregem; 6 Oud-Heverlee Leuven;
7 DVC Eva's Tienen; 8 GBA-Kontich FC;
9 Club Brugge Dames; 10 FC Fémina White Star Woluwe;
11 K. Sint-Truidense VV; 12 DVC Zuid-West-Vlaanderen;
13 Miecroob Veltem; 14 DV Famkes Merkem

Team	Home city	Home ground
Standard Fémina de Liège	Liège	Stade Standard de Liège
RSC Anderlecht	Anderlecht	Koning Boudewijnstadion
WD Lierse SK	Lier	
WB Sinaai Girls	Sinaai	
SV Zulte Waregem	Zulte	Gemeentelijk Sportstadion Zulte
Oud-Heverlee Leuven	Heverlee	Gemeentelijk Stadion
DVC Eva's Tienen	Kumtich	Sint-Barbaracomplex
GBA-Kontich FC	Kontich	
Club Brugge Dames	Bruges	
FC Fémina White Star Woluwe	Woluwe-Saint-Lambert	Stade Fallon
K. Sint-Truidense VV	Sint-Truiden	Stayen
DVC Zuid-West-Vlaanderen	Harelbeke	Forestiersstadion
Miecroob Veltem	Veltem-Beisem	
DV Famkes Merkem	Merkem	De Kouter

== Standings ==
Pos	Team	Pld	W	D	L	GF	GA	GD	Pts	Qualification or relegation
1	Standard Fémina de Liège (C)	26	23	2	1	119	14	+105	71	2011–12 UEFA Women's Champions League
2	RSC Anderlecht	26	20	1	5	79	19	+60	61	
3	WD Lierse SK	26	16	6	4	71	22	+49	54	
4	Sinaai Girls	26	16	3	7	73	35	+38	51	
5	SV Zulte Waregem	26	13	6	7	54	42	+12	45	
6	Oud-Heverlee Leuven	26	13	5	8	32	30	+2	44	
7	DVC Eva's Tienen	26	11	4	11	53	55	−2	37	
8	GBA-Kontich FC	26	9	6	11	44	40	+4	33	
9	Club Brugge Dames	26	8	6	12	31	42	−11	30	
10	FC Fémina White Star Woluwe	26	8	2	16	41	80	−39	26	
11	K. Sint-Truidense VV	26	6	6	14	37	51	−14	24	
12	DVC Zuid-West-Vlaanderen	26	6	0	20	28	94	−66	18	
13	Miecroob Veltem (R)	26	3	5	18	29	72	−43	14	Qualification for Relegation Playoffs
14	DV Famkes Merkem (R)	26	4	0	22	23	118	−95	12	Relegation to 2011–12 First Division (Women)

Updated to match(es) played on 27 April 2012. Source: voetbalkrant.com
Rules for classification: 1) points; 2) goal difference; 3) number of goals scored.
(C) Champions; (R) Relegated
