= Kristien Elsen =

Belgian football midfielder

Personal information
- Full name: Kristien Elsen
- Date of birth: 5 September 1988 (age 38)
- Place of birth: Belgium
- Height: 1.66 m (5 ft 5 in)
- Position: Midfielder

Senior career*
Years	Team	Apps	(Gls)
2004–2010	Rapide Wezemaal		
2010–	Lierse		

International career^{‡}
2003–2005	Belgium U17	7	(1)
2004–2007	Belgium U19	23	(11)
2007–2014	Belgium	23	(1)
- * Club domestic league appearances and goals ‡ National team caps and goals as of 5 April 2014

Kristien Elsen is a Belgian football midfielder currently playing in the Belgian 1st Division for Lierse SK. She has also played the European Cup with Rapide Wezemaal.

She is a member of the Belgian national team. As a junior international she played the 2006 U-19 European Championship, scoring Belgium's only goal in the competition.
