= 2014–15 BeNe League =

Women's BeNe League
- Season: 2014–15
- Champions: Standard Fémina (1st BeNe League title)
- UEFA Women's Champions League: Standard Fémina; Twente
- Matches: 156
- Goals: 492 (3.15 per match)
- Top goalscorer: Tessa Wullaert (18 goals)
- Biggest home win: PSV/FC Eindhoven 7–0 Gent
- Biggest away win: Leuven 0–10 Standard
- Highest scoring: Leuven 0–10 Standard; PEC Zwolle 1–9 ADO Den Haag
- All statistics correct as of 8 May 2015.

The 2014–15 BeNe League was the third and last season of the Belgium and Netherlands' women's football top level league. The defending champion was FC Twente. The season started on 29 August 2014 and was played in a single division. The season finished on 8 May 2015.

Following this season, Belgium and the Netherlands both returned to having their own top-level domestic league. The BeNe League initiative was ended because Dutch clubs and the KNVB failed to agree on the clubs' financial participation for the following seasons. The Dutch association also questioned the lack of competitiveness.

After the season, the Netherlands revived the Eredivisie as top league, and Belgium created a new Super League.

== Format ==
The seven Dutch and six Belgian teams played a double round-robin format, with each team playing twice against every other team, once at home and once away.

== Teams ==
The league was played by seven Dutch and six Belgian teams.

Royal Antwerp left the BeNe League for financial reasons after previous season. Otherwise the same teams as last year compete. Club Brugge shut down their first team after the season, to focus on youth teams.

BeNe League Teams for 2014-2015

Team	Country	Home city	Home ground
Standard Fémina de Liège	Belgium	Liège	Complexe Standard de Liège
RSC Anderlecht	Belgium	Anderlecht	RSCA Football Academy
WD Lierse SK	Belgium	Lier	Herman Vanderpoortenstadion
Club Brugge Dames	Belgium	Bruges	Olympiapark
Oud-Heverlee Leuven	Belgium	Heverlee	Gemeentelijk Stadion
AA Gent Ladies	Belgium	Ghent	PGB-Stadion
ADO Den Haag	Netherlands	The Hague	Kyocera Stadion
FC Twente	Netherlands	Enschede	De Grolsch Veste
Telstar	Netherlands	Velsen	TATA Steel Stadion
PEC Zwolle	Netherlands	Zwolle	IJsseldelta Stadion
SC Heerenveen	Netherlands	Heerenveen	Sportpark Skoatterwâld
AFC Ajax	Netherlands	Amsterdam	Sportpark De Toekomst
PSV/FC Eindhoven	Netherlands	Eindhoven	Jan Louwers Stadion

== Standings ==
All teams played in a single group. The top finishing Belgium and Dutch team qualified for the Champions League.

=== League table ===
Pos	Team	Pld	W	D	L	GF	GA	GD	Pts	Qualification
1	(Belgium) Standard Fémina (C, Q)	24	21	1	2	66	10	+56	64	Qualification to Champions League (Note: The highest-ranking Belgian team and the highest-ranking Dutch team qualify for the Champions League.)
2	(Netherlands) Twente (Q)	24	20	2	2	71	16	+55	62	Qualification to Champions League
3	(Netherlands) Ajax	24	17	2	5	54	20	+34	53	
4	(Netherlands) ADO Den Haag	24	12	3	9	52	35	+17	39	
5	(Netherlands) PSV/FC Eindhoven	24	11	4	9	46	37	+9	37	
6	(Netherlands) Telstar	24	10	7	7	43	31	+12	37	
7	(Belgium) WD Lierse	24	10	3	11	29	29	0	33	
8	(Belgium) Anderlecht Féminin	24	8	6	10	35	37	−2	30	
9	(Belgium) Gent	24	8	2	14	19	42	−23	26	
10	(Netherlands) Heerenveen	24	7	2	15	26	44	−18	23	
11	(Belgium) Club Brugge	24	6	1	17	15	51	−36	19	
12	(Netherlands) PEC Zwolle	24	5	3	16	24	70	−46	18	
13	(Belgium) OH Leuven	24	2	2	20	12	70	−58	8	

Updated to match(es) played on 8 May 2015. Source: BeNe League (in Dutch)
Rules for classification: 1) points; 2) number of wins; 3) goal difference; 4) number of goals scored
(C) Champions; (Q) Qualified for the phase indicated

=== Results ===
Home \ Away	ADO	AJX	PSV	HEE	TEL	TWE	ZWO	AND	CLU	GEN	OHL	LIE	STA
ADO Den Haag		1–6	2–2	4–1	4–1	1–2	1–1	3–1	2–0	3–0	4–0	1–0	0–1
Ajax	3–1		2–1	1–0	1–0	0–2	3–1	1–4	1–2	5–1	3–0	3–0	0–2
PSV/FC Eindhoven	2–0	2–2		2–0	1–3	1–3	3–1	1–0	5–0	7–0	3–0	2–1	1–5
Heerenveen	0–3	0–3	2–3		1–4	1–2	4–1	1–1	1–0	1–0	4–0	0–4	0–2
Telstar	1–1	0–1	3–3	1–0		4–4	3–0	0–0	5–1	5–1	2–0	0–0	0–2
Twente	1–2	0–1	4–0	3–0	2–1		5–0	3–0	5–0	2–1	2–0	3–0	1–1
PEC Zwolle	1–9	1–6	1–0	0–3	1–1	1–5		3–2	1–0	2–3	3–2	1–3	0–3
Anderlecht Féminin	4–1	1–1	3–2	1–1	1–1	0–4	4–1		2–0	0–0	2–1	0–2	0–2
Club Brugge	2–1	0–3	1–1	0–3	1–3	0–3	3–0	1–0		1–0	0–1	0–5	0–2
AA Gent	1–0	0–2	0–1	1–0	0–1	1–4	1–2	1–2	2–0		1–1	2–0	1–0
OH Leuven	2–5	0–3	0–2	0–2	1–3	1–6	1–0	1–6	1–2	0–1		0–2	0–10
WD Lierse	1–2	0–3	2–1	1–0	2–1	0–3	1–1	3–0	2–0	0–1	0–0		0–2
Standard Fémina	2–1	1–0	2–0	7–1	3–0	0–2	4–1	3–1	2–1	3–0	4–0	3–0	

Updated to match(es) played on 8 May 2015. Source: BeNe League (in Dutch)
Legend: Blue = home team win; Yellow = draw; Red = away team win.

== Top goalscorers ==
Updated to games played on 8 May 2015.

Rank	Scorer	Club	Goals
1	(Belgium) Tessa Wullaert	Standard Fémina	18
2	(Netherlands) Lineth Beerensteyn	ADO Den Haag	17
3	(Netherlands) Renate Jansen	ADO Den Haag	16
4	(France) Pauline Crammer	Anderlecht Féminin	15
4	(Netherlands) Vanity Lewerissa	Standard Fémina	15
6	(Netherlands) Anouk Dekker	Twente	14
6	(Netherlands) Ellen Jansen	Twente	14
8	(Netherlands) Jill Roord	Twente	13
9	(Netherlands) Joyce Mijnheer	PEC Zwolle	11
10	(Netherlands) Kristen Koopmans	Telstar	10
10	(Netherlands) Marlous Pieëte	Ajax	10
10	(Netherlands) Daniëlle van de Donk	PSV/FC Eindhoven	10
