= Silke Demeyere =

Belgian footballer (born 1992)

Personal information
- Date of birth: 20 June 1992 (age 34)
- Place of birth: Kortrijk, Belgium
- Position: Midfielder

Team information
- Current team: Le Havre
- Number: 6

Senior career*
Years	Team	Apps	(Gls)
2011	Zulte Waregem		
2012–2015	Brugge	75	(11)
2016–2022	Lille	103	(12)
2022–	Le Havre	19	(3)

International career^{‡}
2010–2011	Belgium U17	6	(0)
2014	Belgium	4	(0)
- * Club domestic league appearances and goals as of 16 July 2023 (UTC) ‡ National team caps and goals as of 16 July 2023

Silke Demeyere (born 20 June 1992) is a Belgian footballer who plays as a midfielder for Division 1 Féminine club Le Havre. She played for the Belgium national team in 2014.

== International career ==
Demeyere has been capped for the Belgium national team, appearing for the team during the UEFA Women's Euro 2017 qualifying cycle.
