= Sherida Spitse =

Dutch footballer (born 1990)

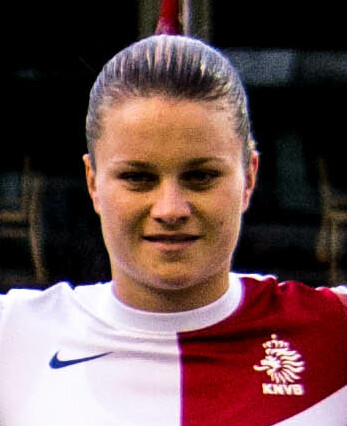
- Spitse with the Netherlands in 2014

Personal information
- Full name: Sherida Spitse
- Date of birth: 29 May 1990 (age 36)
- Place of birth: Sneek, Netherlands
- Height: 1.67 m (5 ft 6 in)
- Position: Midfielder

Team information
- Current team: Ajax
- Number: 8

Youth career
- 2004–2007: VV Sneek

Senior career*
Years	Team	Apps	(Gls)
2007–2012	SC Heerenveen	100	(13)
2012–2014	Twente	38	(26)
2014–2017	LSK Kvinner	65	(16)
2017–2018	Twente	23	(8)
2018–2020	Vålerenga	61	(15)
2021–	Ajax	65	(8)

International career
2005	Netherlands U15	4	(1)
2006	Netherlands U17	9	(1)
2006–2025	Netherlands	248	(46)
Medal record
Women's football
Representing the Netherlands
FIFA Women's World Cup
Runner-up	2019 France
UEFA Women's Championship
Winner	2017 Netherlands
- * Club domestic league appearances and goals as of 14 January 2024

Sherida Spitse (Dutch pronunciation: [ɕeːˈridaː ˈspɪtsə]; born 29 May 1990) is a Dutch professional footballer who plays as a midfielder for Ajax. She has made 248 appearances for the Netherlands national team, making her the most-capped Dutch and European player of all time.

== Club career ==
Spitse started her career at VV Sneek before joining SC Heerenveen when the Eredivisie Vrouwen, the Dutch women's professional league, was established in 2007. In five seasons at Heerenveen, she played in 100 matches and scored 13 goals. In 2012, as the Dutch and Belgian leagues merged to form the BeNe League, Spitse moved to FC Twente in May 2012. At Twente, she won the BeNe League titles in 2012–13 and 2013–14. She was also the club top scorer in 2012–13 with 16 goals.

In December 2013, it was announced that Spitse would transfer to Norwegian Toppserien club LSK Kvinner FK from January 2014. This was the first paid transfer for a Dutch women's football player. With LSK Kvinner, Spitse became a Norwegian League and Cup champion at the end of the 2014 season. She was also voted on to Norway's Team of the Year at the annual NISO awards ceremony in Oslo. She remained in the club for the next two seasons, through 2016, winning the league and cup in both seasons.

On 19 December 2016, during the 2015–16 Eredivisie winter break, she moved back to the Netherlands, agreeing to a contract with FC Twente for the second half of the season. On 16 June 2017, she extended her contract with FC Twente for one season.

During the 2017–18 Eredivisie winter break, on 27 December 2017, she signed a two-year contract with Vålerenga, returning to the Norwegian league.

On 20 November 2020, it was announced that Spitse had returned to the Eredivisie, joining Ajax in January 2021. Spitse was voted player of the year in 2023 and 2024 by Ajax supporters and technical staff.

== International career ==
Spitse made her debut for the Netherlands under coach Vera Pauw on 31 August 2006, in a 4–0 World Cup qualifying defeat to England. At the time, she was 16 years old and still playing with the VV Sneek boys team.

At the UEFA Women's Euro 2009, she was a member of the Dutch squad that reached the semifinals.

In June 2013, national team coach Roger Reijners selected Spitse for the UEFA Women's Euro 2013 in Sweden.

On 7 February 2015, she earned her 100th cap for the Dutch in a match against Thailand. Spitse helped the Netherlands qualify for the 2015 FIFA Women's World Cup and was selected for the final squad. She played all four of Netherlands' matches in the tournament.

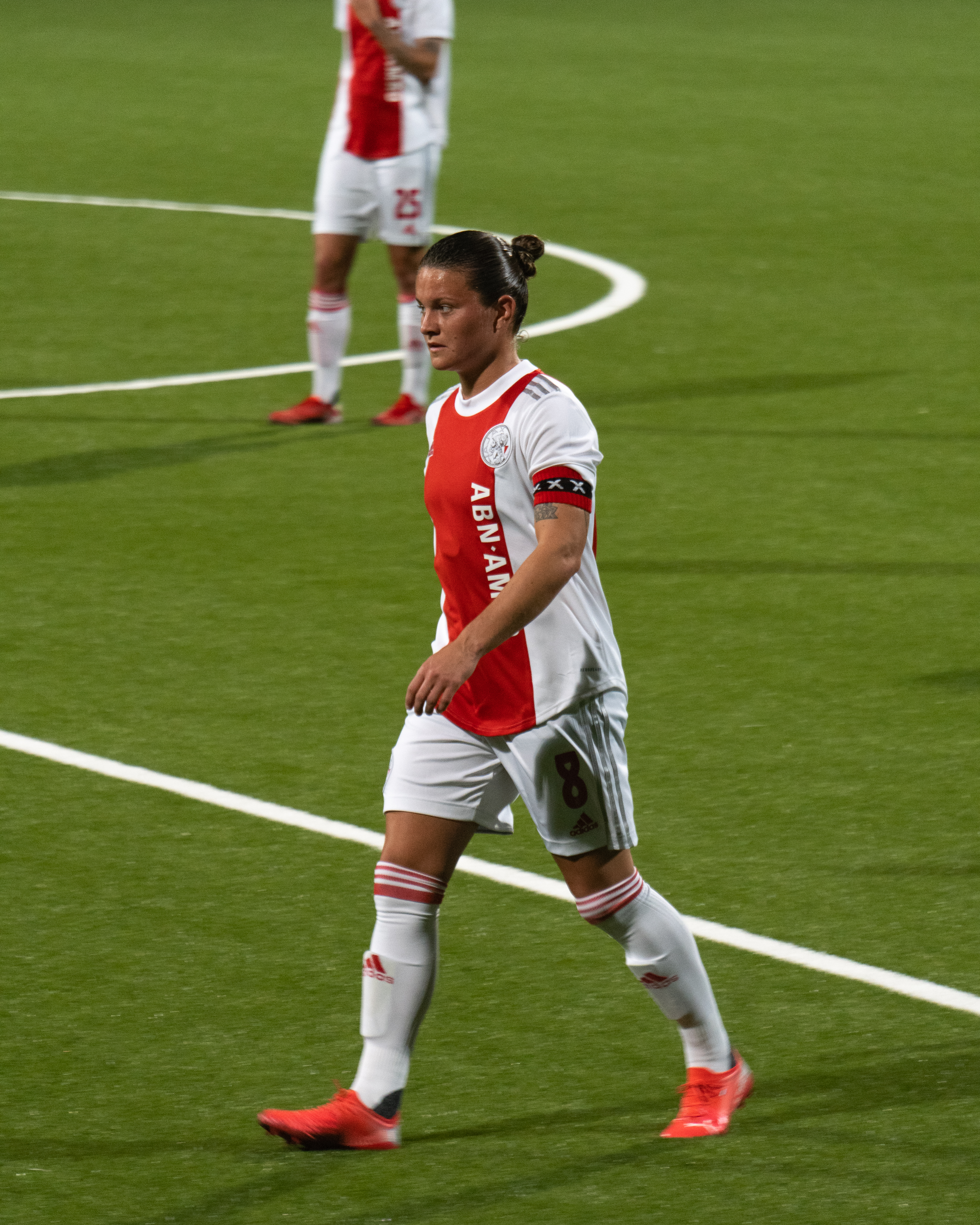
Spitse with Ajax in August 2021

Spitse was part of the Dutch championship team in the UEFA Women's Euro 2017, playing in all matches and being selected for the Team of the Tournament. After the tournament, the team was honoured by prime minister Mark Rutte and minister of sport Edith Schippers and made Knights of the Order of Orange-Nassau.

In the 2019 FIFA Women's World Cup, she reached the final with the Netherlands, losing 2–0 to the United States. In 2019, she became the all-time leader in caps for the Netherlands, passing Annemieke Kiesel.

Spitse suffered a knee injury in July 2021, forcing her to miss the rescheduled 2020 Tokyo Summer Olympics. In June 2022, Spitse earned her 200th cap with the Netherlands.

On 31 May 2023, she was named to the Netherlands provisional squad for the 2023 FIFA Women's World Cup. Spitse was the captain of the Dutch team and appeared in all five of her team's matches.

Spitse announced her retirement from international football in October 2025 and played her final match for the Netherlands on 28 October 2025, in a 1–0 win over Canada.

== Career statistics ==
Scores and results list the Netherlands' goal tally first, score column indicates score after each Spitse goal.

List of international goals scored by Sherida Spitse
No.	Date	Venue	Opponent	Score	Result	Competition
1	22 November 2006	Yanmar Stadion, Almere, Netherlands	Russia	4–0	5–0	Friendly
2	29 October 2009	Oosterenkstadion, Zwolle, Netherlands	Macedonia	8–0	13–1	2011 FIFA Women's World Cup qualification
3	19 December 2010	Pacaembu Stadium, São Paulo, Brazil	Mexico	2–1	2–1	2010 Torneio Internacional
4	2 March 2011	GSP Stadium, Nicosia, Cyprus	New Zealand	1–0	4–1	2011 Cyprus Women's Cup
5	3 April 2011	Kras Stadion, Volendam, Netherlands	Scotland	4–1	6–2	Friendly
6	3 April 2011	Kras Stadion, Volendam, Netherlands	Scotland	6–2	6–2	Friendly
7	24 November 2011	Kyocera Stadion, The Hague, Netherlands	Croatia	2–0	2–0	2013 UEFA Women's Euro qualifying
8	15 February 2012	Stade des Costières, Nîmes, France	France	1–0	1–2	Friendly
9	1 March 2012	GSP Stadium, Nicosia, Cyprus	Scotland	1–0	1–2	2012 Cyprus Women's Cup
10	24 October 2012	Jan Louwers Stadion, Eindhoven, Netherlands	France	1–0	1–1	Friendly
11	25 November 2012	Telstar Stadion, Velsen-Zuid, Netherlands	Wales	2–0	2–0	Friendly
12	29 June 2013	Telstar Stadion, Velsen-Zuid, Netherlands	Australia	3–1	3–1	Friendly
13	5 April 2014	Pankritio Stadium, Heraklion, Greece	Greece	5–0	6–0	2015 FIFA Women's World Cup qualification
14	7 February 2015	Polman Stadion, Almelo, Netherlands	Thailand	1–0	7–0	Friendly
15	4 April 2015	Korinn Stadium, Kópavogur, Iceland	Iceland	1–0	1–2	Friendly
16	17 September 2015	De Vijverberg, Doetinchem, Netherlands	Belarus	5–0	8–0	Friendly
17	17 September 2015	De Vijverberg, Doetinchem, Netherlands	Belarus	7–0	8–0	Friendly
18	4 June 2016	Mandemakers Stadion, Waalwijk, Netherlands	South Africa	1–0	1–0	Friendly
19	25 October 2016	Scholz Arena, Aalen, Germany	Germany	1–2	2–4	Friendly
20	3 March 2017	VRS António Sports Complex, Vila Real de Santo António, Portugal	Australia	2–3	2–3	2017 Algarve Cup
21	20 July 2017	Sparta Stadion Het Kasteel, Rotterdam, Netherlands	Denmark	1–0	1–0	UEFA Women's Euro 2017
22	24 July 2017	Koning Willem II Stadion, Tilburg, Netherlands	Belgium	1–0	2–1	UEFA Women's Euro 2017
23	6 August 2017	De Grolsch Veste, Enschede, Netherlands	Denmark	3–2	4–2	UEFA Women's Euro 2017
24	24 November 2017	NTC Senec, Senec, Slovakia	Slovakia	2–0	5–0	2019 FIFA Women's World Cup qualification
25	6 April 2018	Philips Stadion, Eindhoven, Netherlands	Northern Ireland	4–0	7–0	2019 FIFA Women's World Cup qualification
26	6 April 2018	Philips Stadion, Eindhoven, Netherlands	Northern Ireland	6–0	7–0	2019 FIFA Women's World Cup qualification
27	10 April 2018	Tallaght Stadium, Dublin, Republic of Ireland	Republic of Ireland	2–0	2–0	2019 FIFA Women's World Cup qualification
28	8 June 2018	Shamrock Park, Portadown, Northern Ireland	Northern Ireland	4–0	5–0	2019 FIFA Women's World Cup qualification
29	9 November 2018	Stadion Galgenwaard, Utrecht, Netherlands	Switzerland	1–0	3–0	2019 FIFA Women's World Cup qualification
30	19 January 2019	Green Point Stadium, Cape Town, South-Africa	South Africa	1–0	2–1	Friendly
31	30 August 2019	A. Le Coq Arena, Tallinn, Estonia	Estonia	3–0	7–0	UEFA Women's Euro 2022 qualifying
32	30 August 2019	A. Le Coq Arena, Tallinn, Estonia	Estonia	4–0	7–0	UEFA Women's Euro 2022 qualifying
33	3 September 2019	Abe Lenstra Stadion, Heerenveen, Netherlands	Turkey	3–0	3–0	UEFA Women's Euro 2022 qualifying
34	4 October 2019	Fazanerija City Stadium, Murska Sobota, Slovenia	Slovenia	3–2	4–2	UEFA Women's Euro 2022 qualifying
35	4 October 2019	Fazanerija City Stadium, Murska Sobota, Slovenia	Slovenia	4–2	4–2	UEFA Women's Euro 2022 qualifying
36	8 November 2019	Bornova Stadium, İzmir, Turkey	Turkey	2–0	8–0	UEFA Women's Euro 2022 qualifying
37	8 November 2019	Bornova Stadium, İzmir, Turkey	Turkey	8–0	8–0	UEFA Women's Euro 2022 qualifying
38	12 November 2019	GelreDome, Arnhem, Netherlands	Slovenia	1–1	4–1	UEFA Women's Euro 2022 qualifying
39	12 November 2019	GelreDome, Arnhem, Netherlands	Slovenia	2–1	4–1	UEFA Women's Euro 2022 qualifying
40	10 March 2020	Stade du Hainaut, Valenciennes, France	France	2–0	3–3	2020 Tournoi de France
41	23 October 2020	Euroborg, Groningen, Netherlands	Estonia	4–0	7–0	UEFA Women's Euro 2022 qualifying
42	15 June 2021	De Grolsch Veste, Enschede, Netherlands	Norway	2–0	7–0	Friendly
43	8 April 2022	Euroborg, Groningen, Netherlands	Cyprus	9–0	12–0	2023 FIFA Women's World Cup qualification
44	2 July 2023	Parkstad Limburg Stadion, Kerkrade, Netherlands	Belgium	2–0	5–0	Friendly
45	25 October 2024	De Vijverberg, Doetinchem, Netherlands	Indonesia	3–0	15–0	Friendly
46	4 April 2025	Erve Asito, Almelo, Netherlands	Austria	3–0	3–1	2025 UEFA Women's Nations League

== Personal life ==
Spitse married Jolien van der Tuin in 2018. The two met in Emmen when Van der Tuin played for SC Angelslo. Van der Tuin gave birth to the couple's two children, Jens, born in 2017, and Mila, born in 2020. Spitse and Van der Tuin divorced in 2024.

== Honours ==
FC Twente

- BeNe League: 2012–13, 2013–14
- Eredivisie: 2012–13*, 2013–14*

*During the BeNe League period (2012 to 2015), the highest placed Dutch team is considered as national champion by the Royal Dutch Football Association.

Ajax

- KNVB Women's Cup: 2021–22
- Eredivisie: 2022–23

LSK Kvinner

- Toppserien: 2014, 2015, 2016
- Norwegian Women's Cup: 2014, 2015, 2016

Vålerenga

- Toppserien: 2020
- Norwegian Women's Cup: 2020

Netherlands

- UEFA European Women's Championship: 2017
- Algarve Cup: 2018

Individual

- Knight of the Order of Orange-Nassau: 2017
