= Anouk Dekker =

Dutch footballer

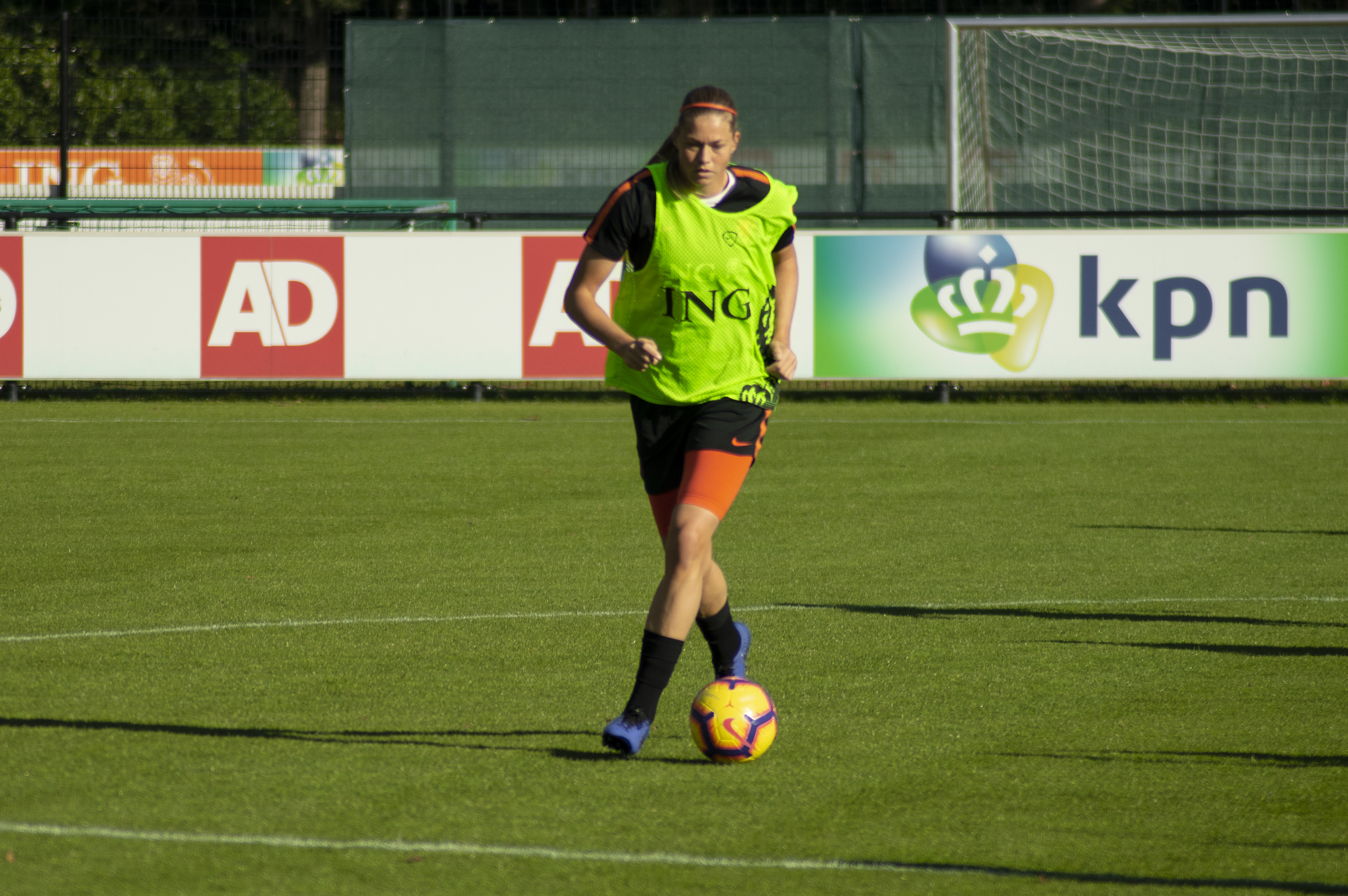
- Anouk Dekker training with Netherlands in November 2018

Personal information
- Full name: Marieke Anouk Dekker
- Date of birth: 15 November 1986 (age 39)
- Place of birth: Almelo, Netherlands
- Height: 1.82 m (6 ft 0 in)
- Positions: Defender; midfielder; forward

Youth career
- SVZW

Senior career*
Years	Team	Apps	(Gls)
2005–2007	FFC Heike Rheine	31	(4)
2007–2015	FC Twente	168	(67)
2016–2021	Montpellier	86	(13)
2021–2023	Braga	36	(7)
2023–2025	Viktoria Berlin	23	(2)

International career^{‡}
2009–2021	Netherlands	87	(7)
Medal record
Women's football
Representing the Netherlands
FIFA Women's World Cup
Silver medal – second place	2019 France	Team
UEFA Women's Championship
Gold medal – first place	2017 Netherlands	Team
- * Club domestic league appearances and goals as of 17 Feb 2023 ‡ National team caps and goals as of 16 December 2017

Marieke Anouk Dekker (Dutch pronunciation: [maːˈrikə ʔaːˈnuɡ ˈdɛkər]; born 15 November 1986) is a Dutch former professional footballer. She is a member of the Netherlands national team.

== Club career ==
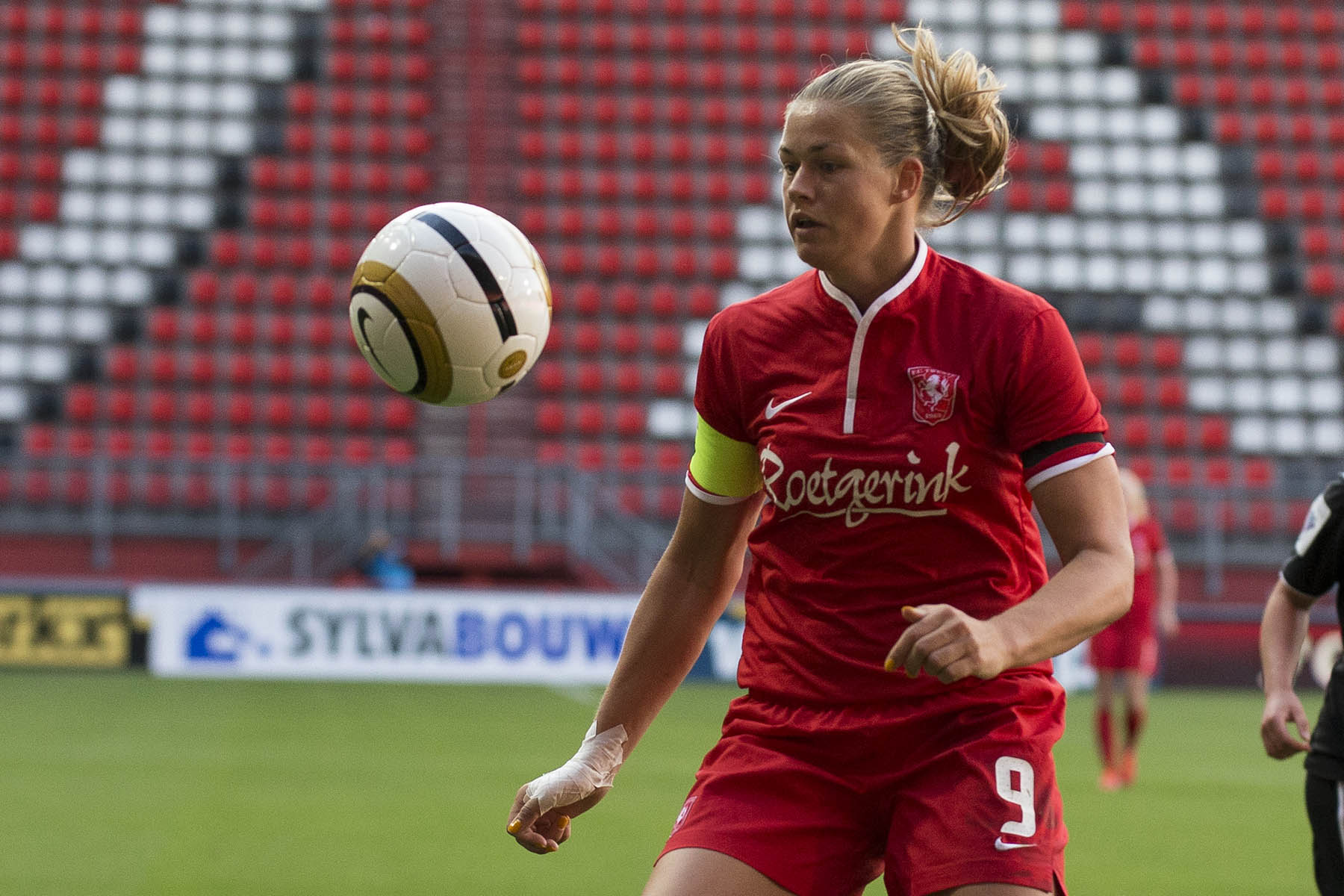
Dekker playing for FC Twente in 2013

She played for FFC Heike Rheine in the Frauen-Bundesliga from 2005 to 2007 before moving to Dutch club FC Twente, which played in the Eredivisie and later the BeNe League, in 2007. After almost nine seasons with FC Twente, she moved to the Division 1 Féminine side Montpellier HSC in January 2016. She played in France for 4 1/2 years before moving to Portugal to play for Braga in the summer of 2021.

== International career ==
On 21 November 2009, Netherlands national team coach Vera Pauw awarded Dekker her first senior cap, versus Belarus.

She was called up to be part of the national team squad for UEFA Women's Euro 2013 in Sweden. Despite suffering a facial injury in the last warm-up friendly, a 3–0 win over Northern Ireland, Dekker retained her place in the squad.

Dekker was also part of the Dutch teams of the 2015 FIFA Women's World Cup and the winning team of the UEFA Women's Euro 2017, she played all matches in both tournaments and was named in the 2017 UEFA Team of the Tournament. After the tournament, the whole team was honoured by the Prime Minister Mark Rutte and Minister of Sport Edith Schippers and made Knights of the Order of Orange-Nassau.

Dekker was selected in the final squad for the 2019 FIFA Women's World Cup in France. She scored in the last group game helping to secure a 2–1 win against Canada. The win left Netherlands top of group E.

=== International goals ===
Scores and results list the Netherlands goal tally first.

G	Date	Venue	Opponent	Score	Result	Competition
1	13 June 2010	Oosterenkstadion, Zwolle, Netherlands	Belgium	1–0	4–1	Friendly
2	19 June 2010	Oosterenkstadion, Zwolle, Netherlands	Norway	2–2	2–2	2011 FIFA Women's World Cup qualification
3	26 October 2013	Estádio José de Carvalho, Maia, Portugal	Portugal	3–0	7–0	2015 FIFA Women's World Cup qualification
4	17 September 2014	Nadderud Stadion, Bekkestua, Norway	Norway	1–0	2–0	2015 FIFA Women's World Cup qualification
5	7 February 2015	Polman Stadion, Almelo, Netherlands	Thailand	5–0	7–0	Friendly
6	8 March 2017	Estádio Algarve, Faro-Loulé, Portugal	Japan	1–0	3–2	2017 Algarve Cup
7	20 June 2019	Stade Auguste-Delaune, Reims, France	Canada	1–0	2–1	2019 FIFA Women's World Cup

== Personal life ==
Dekker has a twin brother, Xander.

== Honours ==
=== Club ===
Twente

- BeNe League: 2012–13, 2013–14
- Eredivisie: 2010–11, 2012–13*, 2013–14*, 2014–15*, 2015–16
- KNVB Women's Cup: 2007–08, 2014–15; runner-up 2012–13
- BeNe Super Cup: runner-up 2011

*During the BeNe League period (2012 to 2015), the highest placed Dutch team is considered as national champion by the Royal Dutch Football Association.

Montpellier

- Coupe de France Féminine: runner-up 2015–16

=== International ===
Netherlands

- UEFA European Women's Championship: 2017

=== Individual ===
- Knight of the Order of Orange-Nassau: 2017
