= Kayra Nelemans =

Dutch footballer (2002)

Personal information
- Full name: Kayra Nelemans
- Date of birth: 11 October 2002 (age 24)
- Place of birth: Vlaardingen, Netherlands
- Position: Defender

Team information
- Current team: Club YLA
- Number: 55

Youth career
- ADO Den Haag

Senior career*
Years	Team	Apps	(Gls)
2019–2025	ADO Den Haag	110	(4)
2025–	Club YLA		

International career
2017	Netherlands U15	3	(1)
2018	Netherlands U16	2	(0)
- * Club domestic league appearances and goals as of 16 May 2025

Kayra Nelemans (born 11 October 2002) is a Dutch professional footballer who plays as defender for Club YLA.

== Personal life ==
Nelemans was born in Vlaardingen.
