= Belgian Women's Super League =

- Organising body: Pro League
- Founded: 2015
- Country: Belgium
- Confederation: UEFA
- Number of clubs: 8
- Level on pyramid: 1
- Relegation to: Belgian Women's First Division
- Domestic cup: Belgian Women's Cup
- International cup: UEFA Champions League
- Current champions: OH Leuven (2025–26)
- Website: https://www.scoooresuperleague.be/en
- Current: 2026–27 season

The Belgian Women's Super League (Dutch: Super League Vrouwenvoetbal/Belgisch Vrouwenvoetbal Kampioenschap; French: Superligue/Championnat de Belgique féminin de football; German: Superliga/Belgische Frauenfußballmeisterschaft) is the highest women's football league in Belgium. It was created in 2015 after the BeNe League, a joint league for Belgium and the Netherlands, folded after the 2014–15 season.

== Format ==
In season 2015–16, eight teams participated. They played a double round-robin in the first stage. After that, points were halved and the top four placed and bottom placed teams each played another double round-robin for a total of 20 games. The winner of the championship group qualified for the Champions League. The last placed team of the relegation group was relegated.

With only seven teams in 2016–17, the format was changed and the second stage was dropped. Teams played each other four times for a total of 24 matches per team. The tie-breakers for teams on equal points follow the men's Belgian First Division A, that is first number of wins, then goal difference.

In 2017–18, only six teams played in the league and again a championship group was played.

== Teams ==
Location of the 2026–27 Belgian Super League teams

Club Brugge was the only team not returning from the BeNe League for the Super League's first season, after they shut down their first team. The remaining five sides and the three highest placed teams from the first division got a place in the inaugural season, although DVL Zonhoven moved to Genk and was rebranded as Ladies Genk. In June the final line-up was published.

2015 and 2016 cup winners Lierse did not return for the 2016–17 season, leaving the league with just seven teams as none of the teams from the first division accepted the final eighth place.

=== Current (2026–27) teams ===
Club	Home city	Home ground	Capacity
RSC Anderlecht	Anderlecht	Belgian Football Center, Tubize	1,000
Genk	Genk	SportinGenk Park, Genk	2,000
AA Gent Ladies	Ghent	PGB-Stadion, Ghent	6,500
Les Louviéroises	La Louvière	Easi Arena, La Louvière	8,050
Club YLA	Bruges	Municipal Sports Center, Aalter	1,500
Oud-Heverlee Leuven	Leuven	OHL Banqup Campus, Oud-Heverlee (Note: Some matches played at Den Dreef.)	3,330
Standard Liège	Liège	Stade Maurice Dufrasne, Liège	27,670
Zulte-Waregem	Zulte	Municipal Sports Stadium, Zulte	2,500

== Champions ==
The winners of the league are crowned Belgian champions.

Year	Winner	Runners-up	Third	Topscorer	Goals
2015–16	Standard Liège	Lierse	Anderlecht	Jana Coryn (Lierse)	19
2016–17	Standard Liège	Anderlecht	AA Gent Ladies	Sanne Schoenmakers (Standard)	26
2017–18	Anderlecht	AA Gent Ladies	KRC Genk Ladies	Ella Van Kerkhoven (Anderlecht)	27
2018–19	Anderlecht	Standard Liège	KRC Genk Ladies	Ella Van Kerkhoven (Anderlecht)	21
2019–20	Anderlecht	Standard Liège	AA Gent Ladies	Sanne Schoenmakers (Standard)	12
2020–21	Anderlecht	Oud-Heverlee Leuven	AA Gent Ladies	Tessa Wullaert (Anderlecht)	38
2021–22	Anderlecht	Oud-Heverlee Leuven	Standard Liège	Tessa Wullaert (Anderlecht)	35
2022–23	Anderlecht	Oud-Heverlee Leuven	Standard Liège	Ella Van Kerkhoven (OH Leuven)	21
2023–24	Anderlecht	Standard Liège	Oud-Heverlee Leuven	Dilja Zomers (Oud-Heverlee Leuven)	20
2024–25	Oud-Heverlee Leuven	Anderlecht	Standard Liège	Davinia Vanmechelen (Club YLA)	16
2025–26	Oud-Heverlee Leuven	Anderlecht	Club YLA	Gwen Duijsters (Genk Ladies); Jada Conijnenberg (OH Leuven)	15
