= WB Sinaai Girls =

Belgian football club

- Full name: Sinaai Girls
- Founded: 1988
- Ground: Wijnveld
- Chairman: Terry van Osselaer
- League: 2nd Provincial East-Flanders
- Website: https://www.sinaaigirls.be/
Home colours

Waasland-Beveren Sinaai Girls is a Belgian women's football club from Klein-Sinaai, Sint-Niklaas. Founded in 1988, Sinaai Girls has played in the Belgian First Division since 1994. Since 2012 it also represents Waasland-Beveren.

Sinaai Girls has been most successful in the Belgian Cup with three titles in a row between 2009 and 2011, the first 3-year winning streak in the competition since 1979. It previously reached the final in 1997 and 2001. Since 2007 the team has ended in the First Division's top five positions, with 2010's 3rd spot being its best historic result.

When it became apparent that it was almost impossible for an autonomous women's football club to continue to compete at the highest level (BeNe League / Super League), a conscious decision was made in 2014 to return to the Wijnveld stadion and to play on a lower level.

The club played in the Second Division (level 3) between 2014 and 2019. In 2019, it was decided to go done 2 levels more and since then they play in 2nd Provincial East-Flanders (level 5).

== Titles ==
- Three Belgian Cups (2009 — 2011)
