= Club YLA =

Belgian football club

- Full name: Club Yvonne Lahousse
- Nickname: Club Brugge
- Founded: 2000 (KSV Jabbeke); 2010 (Club Brugge Dames); 2020 (Club YLA)
- Ground: Municipal Sports Centre, Aalter; Schiervelde Stadion (selected matches)
- Capacity: 1,500
- Owner: Club Brugge
- CEO: (Belgium) Guillian Preud'homme
- Manager: (Belgium) Jonas Devos
- League: Belgian Women's Super League
- 2025–26: 3rd
- Website: clubbrugge.be/club-yla
| Home colours | Away colours | Third colours |

Club YLA is Club Brugge's women's section. It was founded in 2000 as the women's division of KSV Jabbeke. In 2010 they started working together with Club Brugge as it was needed to cooperate with a male club in the highest division to become part of the Elite League for women.

== History ==
In 2012 they changed their name into Club Brugge Dames. In 2012 they joined the new BeNe League. After the 2014/15 season the first team was disbanded.

Season 2020-21 saw renewed interest and a new competition format with the "Scooore Super League". Club Brugge KV changed its name to "Club YLA". YLA are the initials of Yvonne Lahousse(died January 12, 2006) who was one of the leading ladies of Club Bruges' fanbase from mid 1960s until her death.
Additionally, YLA is part of a new identity and branding of the women's team. Clothes and merchandising equivalent to the Club YLA look & feel is made available from the webshop.

They ended the 2020-21 regular competition in fifth place, which earned them a place in Play-off 1. These play-offs however, saw no further improvement and Club YLA finished the season in fifth.
This was the last season for Leo Van der Elst as T1, and now fulfills the role of marketing- and recruitment manager.

For season 2021-22 Dennis Moerman left his position as T2 of KAA Gent Ladies, to become the new head coach of Club YLA.

In early April 2022, Van Der Elst announced that Club YLA will be using a period coach the next season, in an effort to reduce the possibility of injuries and / or optimise performances.

== Honours ==
- Belgian Women's Cup

finalists (2x): 2013/14, 2014/15
winner (1x): 2023/24

- Belgian Women's First Division (II)

vice-champions (1x): 2018/19

- Belgian Women's Second Division (III)

champions (1x): 2017/18 (A-series)
vice-champions (1x): 2016/17 (A-series)

== Results ==
| Season | Level | | | Competition | Pts. | Notes | Cup |
| Season | I | II | III | Competition | Pts. | Notes | Cup |
|---|---|---|---|---|---|---|---|
| 2010/11 | 9 | | | Eerste Klasse | 30 | | 1/16 final |
| 2011/12 | 8 | | | Eerste Klasse | 37 | | 1/8 final |
| 2012/13 | 11 | | | Women's BeNe League | 19 | 8th place in the BeNe League B | Semi-final |
| 2013/14 | 16 | | | Women's BeNe League | 13 | | Final |
| 2014/15 | 11 | | | Women's BeNe League | 19 | | Final |
A-team disbanded, B-team is the new main team
| 2015/16 | | | 4 | Tweede Klasse A | 44 | | Third round |
| 2016/17 | | | 2 | Tweede Klasse A | 68 | | Third round |
| 2017/18 | | | 1 | Tweede Klasse A | 68 | | Quarter-final |
| 2018/19 | | 2 | | Eerste Klasse | 57 | | 1/8 final |
| 2019/20 | 5 | | | Super League | 13 | Competition was stopped early due to the COVID-19 pandemic | 1/8 final |
| 2020/21 | 5 | | | Super League | 17 | Cub YLA finished 5th in the regular season with 26 points. | n/a (Note: This edition was cancelled due to the COVID-19 pandemic.) |
| 2021/22 | 5 | | | Super League | 20 | Cub YLA finished 5th in the regular season with 35 points. | Semi-final |
| 2022/23 | 3 | | | Super League | 30 | Cub YLA finished 3rd in the regular season with 37 points. | Semi-final |
| 2023/24 | 4 | | | Super League | 24 | Cub YLA finished 4th in the regular season with 31 points. | Winner |
| 2024/25 | 4 | | | Super League | 21 | Cub YLA finished 4th in the regular season with 33 points. | 1/4 final |
| 2025/26 | 3 | | | Super League | 22 | Cub YLA finished 3rd in the regular season with 34 points. | 1/2 final |

== Current squad ==
As of 9 July 2026

Note: Flags indicate national team as defined under FIFA eligibility rules; some limited exceptions apply. Players may hold more than one non-FIFA nationality.

| No. | Pos. | Nation | Player |
|---|---|---|---|
| 2 | DF | NED | Moïsa van Koot |
| 4 | DF | BEL | Amy Littel |
| 6 | MF | NED | Amber van Heeswijk |
| 8 | MF | BEL | Chloé Vande Velde |
| 9 | FW | BEL | Lisa Petry |
| 11 | MF | MAR | Rania Boutiebi |
| 13 | FW | BEL | Angel Kerkhove |
| 16 | MF | BEL | Margaux Martlé |
| 17 | MF | FRA | Amélie Delabre |
| 18 | DF | BEL | Isabelle Iliano |
| 19 | FW | NED | Lieke Vis |
| 20 | GK | BEL | Améline Goemaere |
| 21 | DF | BEL | Caitlin Lievens |
| 11 | MF | BEL | Estée D’Hooghe |

| No. | Pos. | Nation | Player |
|---|---|---|---|
| 24 | MF | BEL | Luz de Wolf |
| 28 | DF | BEL | Romane Jadoulle |
| 30 | GK | BEL | Nell Van Dyck |
| 37 | GK | NED | Nicole Panis |
| 31 | GK | BEL | Marie Elferink |
| 33 | MF | BEL | Loes van Mullem |
| 41 | MF | BEL | Lotte Vanderhaegen |
| 42 | MF | BEL | Romy Wenning |
| 43 | DF | BEL | Esmée Dejonckheere |
| 44 | MF | BEL | Noor Persyn |
| 46 | FW | BEL | Clementine Reynebeau |
| 47 | DF | BEL | Free Vanneste |
| 55 | DF | NED | Kayra Nelemans |
| — | FW | BEL | Liesanne Loose |

== Head coaches ==
- (Belgium) Jean-Marie Saeremans
- (Belgium) Karel Gobert (2013–2013)
- (Belgium) Gunther Bomon (2013–2014)
- (Belgium) Dieter Lauwers (2014–2015)
- (Belgium) Leo Van der Elst (2017–2020)
- (Belgium) Dennis Moerman (2021-2023)
- (Belgium) Heleen Jaques (2023-2024)
- (Germany) Inka Grings (2024-2025)
- (Netherlands) Sjaak Polak (2025-2026)
- (Belgium) Jonas Devos (2026-~)

== References & notes ==
Notes
