= SV Zulte Waregem (women) =

Belgian football club

Zulte Waregem
- Full name: Dames Sportvereniging Zulte Waregem
- Founded: 1971 / 2010
- Ground: The Farm, Zulte
- Capacity: 1,000
- Chairman: Willy Naessens
- Manager: Kenny Engels
- League: Super League
- 2024–25: Belgian Women's Super League, 7th
- Website: https://www.essevee.be/nl/academie/dames
| Home colours | Away colours |

Dames SV Zulte Waregem is a Belgian women's football club from Zulte representing SV Zulte Waregem in the Belgian First Division, where it has played since 2004 except for the 2008 and 2009 seasons. It was founded in 1971 as Dames Zultse VV, and became Zulte Waregem's women team in 2010. In its first season as such the team attained its best result so far, a 5th spot.

== Players ==
=== First-Team Squad ===
As of 8 July 2026

Note: Flags indicate national team as defined under FIFA eligibility rules; some limited exceptions apply. Players may hold more than one non-FIFA nationality.

| No. | Pos. | Nation | Player |
|---|---|---|---|
| 1 | GK | FRA | Hillary Damman |
| 2 | DF | BEL | Heike Maelfait |
| 4 | DF | BEL | Jinte Leeman |
| 5 | DF | BEL | Pauline Windels |
| 6 | MF | BEL | Léna Hubaut |
| 7 | FW | BEL | Daisy Baudewijns |
| 9 | FW | BEL | Oona Careel |
| 10 | DF | BEL | Amber Bert |
| 11 | FW | BEL | Lieke De Smet |

| No. | Pos. | Nation | Player |
|---|---|---|---|
| 16 | MF | NED | Melanie Gerrits |
| 17 | DF | BEL | Jenna Van De Keere |
| 18 | MF | BEL | Febe Van Herreweghe |
| 19 | DF | BEL | Lisa Vanhentenrijk |
| 20 | MF | BEL | Nadège François |
| 21 | GK | BEL | Yana Lissens |
| 23 | MF | BEL | Hanne Hellinx |
| 24 | GK | BEL | Ilse Verschiere |
| 25 | FW | BEL | Amelie Depraetere |
| 27 | DF | BEL | Martith Decabooter |
| 28 | MF | FRA | Marie Hannedouche |
| 34 | DF | NED | Diana Hilhorst |
| 80 | MF | COD | Francesca Lueya |
| 88 | FW | FRA | Marie Ateluce |
| — | GK | FRA | Chloé Thobois |
| — | DF | BEL | Josephine Van den Broecke |
| — | DF | NED | Lotte Jansen |
| — | MF | BEL | Silke Demeyere |

== Honours ==
- Belgian Women's Second Division

Winners (2): 2003, 2009,

== Season to season ==
| Season | Tier | Division | Place | Belgian Cup |
|---|---|---|---|---|
| 2008–09 | 2 | Second Division | 1st | |
| 2009–10 | 1 | First Division | 9th | Round of 16 |
| 2010–11 | 1 | First Division | 5th | Semi-finals |
| 2011–12 | 1 | First Division | 7th | Quarter-finals |
| 2012–13 | 1 | BeNe League | 15th | Quarter-finals |
| 2013–14 | 2 | First Division | 8th | Fourth round |
| 2014–15 | 2 | First Division | 5th | Third round |
| 2015–16 | 2 | First Division | 2nd | Quarter-finals |
| 2016–17 | 2 | First Division | 10th | Semi-finals |
| 2017–18 | 2 | First Division | 4th | Round of 16 |

| Season | Tier | Division | Place | Belgian Cup |
|---|---|---|---|---|
| 2018–19 | 2 | First Division | 7th | Fourth round |
| 2019–20 | 2 | First Division | 6th | Fourth round |
| 2020–21 | 1 | Super League | 8th | Round of 16 |
| 2021–22 | 1 | Super League | 7th | Quarter-finals |
| 2022–23 | 1 | Super League | 7th | Semi-finals |
| 2023–24 | 1 | Super League | 8th | Semi-finals |
| 2024–25 | 1 | Super League | 7th | Round of 16 |
| 2025–26 | 1 | Super League | 5th | Final |
