= Sint-Truidense VV (women) =

Belgian football club

Sint-Truidense
- Full name: Koninklijke Sint-Truidense Voetbalvereniging Vrouwen
- Nickname: De Kanaries (The Canaries)
- Founded: 1983, 2008
- Ground: Jeugdcomplex Sint-Truidense VV
- Capacity: 500
- Chairman: André Donvil
- Manager: Fons Moons
- League: BeNe League
- 2011-12: 4th
| Home colours | Away colours |

K. Sint-Truidense VV Vrouwen is a Belgian women's football club representing K. Sint-Truidense VV in the Belgian First Division.

Originally established in 1983 as FCL Rapide Wezemaal, it was absorbed by Sint-Truidense in 2008, moving from Wezemaal, Rotselaar to Sint-Truiden. The team enjoyed its most successful period so far between 2004 and 2008, winning four championships in a row (including two doubles) and reaching the 2008 European Cup quarterfinals. In 2010 it won its first championship as Sint-Truidense.

The team won the Belgian championship in 2004, 2005, 2006 and 2007, thereby qualifying for the UEFA Women's Cup. After only reaching the first qualifying round in the Women'S Cups 2004-05 and 2005–06, the team reached the second qualifying round in the next season and in 2007-08 went all the way to the quarter finals.

== Titles ==
- 5 Belgian Leagues (2004 — 2007, 2010)
- 6 Belgian Cups (1993, 1997, 2001, 2003, 2004, 2007)
- 1 Belgian Supercup (2006)

=== Record in UEFA competitions ===
| Season | Competition | Stage | Result | Opponent |
|---|---|---|---|---|
| 2004–05 | UEFA Women's Cup | Qualifying Stage | 1–4 | (Federal Republic of Yugoslavia) Mašinac Niš |
| | | | 2–3 | (Scotland) Hibernian |
| | | | 2–0 | (Croatia) Maksimir |
| 2005–06 | UEFA Women's Cup | Qualifying Stage | 1–2 | (Netherlands) Saestum |
| | | | 0–3 | (Spain) Athletic Bilbao |
| | | | 5–1 | (Scotland) Glasgow City |
| 2006–07 | UEFA Women's Cup | Qualifying Stage | 5–0 | (Slovenia) Pomurje |
| | | | 7–0 | (Estonia) Pärnu |
| | | | 6–1 | (Serbia) Mašinac Niš |
| | | Group Stage | 0–1 | (Germany) Turbine Potsdam |
| | | | 4–2 | (Czech Republic) Sparta Prague |
| | | | 0–2 | (Netherlands) Saestum |
| 2007–08 | UEFA Women's Cup | Qualifying Stage | 2–0 | (Wales) Cardiff City |
| | | | 2–0 | (Croatia) Osijek |
| | | | 1–0 | (Portugal) 1º Dezembro |
| | | Group Stage | 2–1 | (England) Everton |
| | | | 0–4 | (Iceland) Valur |
| | | | 1–1 | (Germany) Frankfurt |
| | | Quarter-finals | 0–4 0–6 | (Sweden) Umeå |
| 2010–11 | Champions League | Round of 32 | 0–3 0–7 | (Czech Republic) Sparta Prague |
