= Lierse SK (women) =

Belgian football club

Lierse
- Full name: Women's Department Lierse Sportkring
- Founded: 1996
- Dissolved: 2016
- Ground: Jeugdcentrum KSK Lierse
- Capacity: 500
- Chairman: Maged Samy
- Manager: Johan Breugelmans
- League: BeNe League
- 2014–15: 7th

Lierse SK was a Belgian football team from Lier. Its women's division was a top flight team until 2016, winning two cup finals in its last two seasons. Just months after eliminating its Super League team (after the 2015–16 season), the club also withdrew its second team (playing in the First Division) at the start of the 2016–17 season – only to keep its development teams in competition.

== History ==
Lierse's women's division was founded in 1996 as Teamsport Beerse. Five years later it changed its name to Vlimmeren Sports, in whose facilities it had been playing. In 2004, Vlimmeren was promoted to the Belgian top division.

In 2010, the team moved to Lier and became Lierse SK's women's football team. In its first season as such it reached the national Cup's final.

After finishing second in the Super League in 2015/16, they did not return for the next season.

Among its players was the judo champion Merel Groenen, the older sister of Manchester United midfielder and Netherlands international Jackie Groenen.

== Honours ==
- Belgian Women's Cup: 2015, 2016
