= Belgian Women's First National Division =

- Founded: 1973
- Country: Belgium
- Confederation: RBFA
- Number of clubs: 14
- Level on pyramid: 2
- Promotion to: Super League
- Relegation to: Interprovincial Division
- Domestic cup: Belgian Women's Cup
- Most championships: Standard de Liege (16)

The Belgian Women's First National Division, formerly Belgian Women's First Division is the second highest women's football league of Belgium.

The league was the top level league until 2011–12. It was first played in 1973–74. From 2012 to 2013 to 2014–16 Belgium's best teams play in the joint league with the best Dutch teams in the BeNe League. The champion of the league qualified for the UEFA Women's Champions League.

In 2015/16 the top level Super League was established above the First Division.

== Format ==
For the season 2014–15, 14 teams participate, playing a double round-robin schedule to decide the champion. The bottom team is relegated to the Belgian Women's Second Division, the 3rd level. The 13th-placed team played a relegation match against the 2nd-placed team of the second division.

== 2023-2024 teams ==
Team	Home city	Home ground
Alken	Alken	
Anderlecht B	Brussels	RSCA Football Academy Terrein 2
Chastre	Chastre	Terrein de Chastre
Club Brugge B	Brugge	Jan Breydelstation Terrein 4
Famkes Merkem	Diksmuide	Batimont Solar Park Oostende
Zulte Waregem	Zulte	Gemeentelijk Sportstadion
Gent II	Gent	Neptunuscomplex
Kontich FC	Kontich	
Union Saint-Ghislain Tertre-Hautrage	Saint-Ghislain	Stade Saint-Lô
Tongeren DV	Tongeren	SportOase Eburons Dome
VC Moldavo	Mol	Georges Claesstadion
Eendracht Aalst	Aalst	Complex Jeugdcentrum Zandberg
Ladies Genk II	Genk	Terrain Turske Rangers
KVK Svelta Melsele	Beveren-Waas	Campus Svelta Melsele-terrain synthetique

== Belgian champions ==
The winners of the first division were Belgian champions until 2012 when the league was superseded by the BeNe League. The first two seasons featured local competitions, at the end of the season the winners played for the championship.

Year	Winner	Runner-up	Third	Notes
1971–72	Astro Begijnendijk			
1972–73	Astro Begijnendijk			
1973–74	St-Nicolas FC Liège			
1974–75	Astro Begijnendijk			
1975–76	Standard Fémina de Liège			
1976–77	Standard Fémina de Liège			
1977–78	Standard Fémina de Liège			
1978–79	Herk Sport			
1979–80	Sefa Dames Herentals			
1980–81	Cercle Brugge			
1981–82	Standard Fémina de Liège			
1982–83	RWD Herentals			
1983–84	Standard Fémina de Liège			
1984–85	Standard Fémina de Liège			
1985–86	Standard Fémina de Liège			
1986–87	Brüssel D. 71			
1987–88	RWD Herentals			
1988–89	Herk Sport			
1989–90	Standard Fémina de Liège			
1990–91	Standard Fémina de Liège			
1991–92	Standard Fémina de Liège			
1992–93	Herk Sport			
1993–94	Standard Fémina de Liège			
1994–95	RSC Anderlecht			
1995–96	Eendracht Aalst			
1996–97	RSC Anderlecht			
1997–98	RSC Anderlecht			
1998–99	Eendracht Aalst			
1999–00	Eendracht Aalst	RSC Anderlecht	KFC Rapide Wezemaal	
2000–01	Eendracht Aalst			
2001–02	Eendracht Aalst	KFC Rapide Wezemaal	Standard Fémina de Liège	
2002–03	SK Lebeke-Aalst	KFC Rapide Wezemaal	Standard Fémina de Liège	
2003–04	KFC Rapide Wezemaal	RSC Anderlecht	Eva's Kumtich	
2004–05	KFC Rapide Wezemaal	Eva's Kumtich	RSC Anderlecht	
2005–06	KFC Rapide Wezemaal	RSC Anderlecht	DVC Zuid-West Vlaanderen	
2006–07	KFC Rapide Wezemaal	RSC Anderlecht	K. Vlimmeren Sport	
2007–08	KVK Tienen	RSC Anderlecht	FCL Rapide Wezemaal	
2008–09	Standard Fémina de Liège	KVK Tienen	K. Sint-Truidense VV	
2009–10	K. Sint-Truidense VV	Standard Fémina de Liège	Sinaai Girls	
2010–11	Standard Fémina de Liège	RSC Anderlecht	Lierse SK	
2011–12	Standard Fémina de Liège	RSC Anderlecht	Lierse SK	

== League winners since 2013 ==
Winners of the First Division as a second level league.

- 2012/13: DVC Eva's Tienen
- 2013/14: DVC Eva's Tienen
- 2014/15: DVC Eva's Tienen
- 2015/16: Standard Liège II
- 2016/17: AA Gent II
- 2017/18: Kontich FC
- 2018/19: Fémina White Star Woluwe
- 2019/20: Eendracht Aalst Ladies
- 2020/21: No champion, season cancelled due to Corona
- 2021/22: AA Gent II
- 2022/23: Kontich FC
- 2023/24: KVC Westerlo
- 2024/25: Club Bruges B
- 2025/26: OH Leuven B

=== Record champions ===
Listed are the number of championships from 1972 to 2024.

Titles	Team
16	Standard de Liège (incl. St-Nicolas FC Liège)
10	RSC Anderlecht (incl. Brüssel D. 71)
6	Eendracht Aalst
5	Sint-Truidense VV (incl. KFC Rapide Wezemaal)
4	DVC Eva's Tienen
3	Astro Begijnendijk; Herk Sport; RWD Herentals (incl. Sefa Dames Herentals)
2	AA Gent II; FC Kontich
1	Cercle Brugge; SK Lebbeke-Aalst; KVK Tienen; KVC Westerlo; Club Bruges B OH Leuven B

== See also ==
- Super League
