= RSC Anderlecht (women) =

- Full name: Royal Sporting Club Anderlecht Women
- Short name: RSCA Women
- Founded: 1971; 1993
- Ground: Belgian Football Center
- Capacity: 1,000
- Chairman: Michael Verschueren
- Manager: Dennis Moerman
- League: Super League
- 2025-26: 2nd
- Website: https://women.rsca.be/en
Home colours	Away colours

RSC Anderlecht Féminin is a Belgian women's football team, currently playing at the Super League Vrouwenvoetbal. It formerly played the Belgian First Division and the BeNe League, that was folded in 2015. The team was founded in 1971 as Brussels Dames 71.

The team won one Belgian championship and four national cups as Brussels D71 between 1984 and 1991, and three championships and five cups as Anderlecht between 1994 and 2005, including doubles in 1987 and 1998, with the 1994-1999 lustrum being its most successful period. With ten titles Anderlecht is the Cup's most successful team. Since 2004 it has been the championship's runner-up in five occasions, most recently in 2011.

Twenty years after their last championship they again won the title in 2018. They followed that up with two more championships in the following seasons.

== Titles ==
=== Official ===
- Super League (7)
  - 2018, 2019, 2020, 2021, 2022, 2023, 2024
- Belgian League (4)
  - 1987, 1995, 1997, 1998
- Belgian Cup (11)
  - 1984, 1985, 1987, 1991, 1994, 1996, 1998, 1999, 2005, 2013, 2022, 2026
- Belgian Supercup (3)
  - 1995, 1996, 1997

=== Invitational ===
- Menton Tournament (4)
  - 1992, 1996, 1999, 2003

== First team squad ==
As of 17 July 2026

Note: Flags indicate national team as defined under FIFA eligibility rules; some limited exceptions apply. Players may hold more than one non-FIFA nationality.

No.	Pos.	Nation	Player
4	DF	BEL	Nia Elyn
5	DF	BEL	Fran Meersman
6	FW	BEL	Tine De Caigny
7	MF	ISL	Andrea Rut Bjarnadóttir
9	FW	ISL	Vigdís Lilja Kristjánsdóttir
10	MF	ROU	Ștefania Vătafu
11	MF	BEL	Esthée Maerschalck
13	MF	BEL	Marie Minnaert
14	DF	BEL	Laura Deloose

No.	Pos.	Nation	Player
17	MF	BEL	Karlijn Helsen
18	MF	BEL	Manon Baert
19	FW	SWE	Klara Folkesson
20	FW	LTU	Rimantė Jonušaitė
21	FW	BEL	Marie Degroote
26	DF	BEL	Shari Van Belle
27	GK	BEL	Marie Pues
28	MF	ITA	Béatrice Martone
31	GK	BEL	Louise Vervoort
—	GK	BEL	Alyssa van de Poel
—	GK	BEL	Jorijn Covent
—	DF	BEL	Lina Meeuwis
—	MF	BEL	Fien Vanoverschelde
—	MF	BEL	Wies Dehaemers
—	MF	BEL	Jolien Verhoeven
—	MF	NED	Suus Verdaasdonk
—	MF	BEL	Gaëlle Nierynck
—	FW	SWE	Rebecca Maravall Almqvist

== Head coaches ==
- (Belgium) Lucien Paulis (2009–2010)
- (Belgium) Gunther Bomon (2010–2011)
- (Belgium) Filip De Winne (2011–2016)
- (Belgium) Patrick Wachel (2016–2021)
- (Belgium) Johan Walem (2021–2022)
- (Belgium) Dave Mattheus (2022-2024)
- (Belgium) Dennis Moerman (2024-)

== Season to season ==
Season	Div.	Place	Cup
1973–74	1	8th	
1974–75	1	3rd	
1975–76	1	3rd	
1976–77	1	3rd	
1977–78	1	11th	
1978–79	1	2nd	
1979–80	1	8th	
1980–81	1	6th	
1981–82	1	5th	
1982–83	1	3rd	
1983–84	1	4th	Champion
1984–85	1	4th	Champion
1985–86	1	6th	
1986–87	1	1st	Champion
1987–88	1	4th	
1988–89	1	4th	Finalist
1989–90	1	2nd	Finalist
1990–91	1	4th	Champion
1991–92	1	4th	
1992–93	1	4th	
1993–94	1	3rd	Champion
1994–95	1	1st	Finalist
1995–96	1	2nd	Champion
1996–97	1	1st	
1997–98	1	1st	Champion
1998–99	1	3rd	Champion
1999–00	1	2nd	
2000–01	1	3rd	
2001–02	1	9th	
2002–03	1	5th	
2003–04	1	2nd	Finalist
2004–05	1	3rd	Champion
2005–06	1	2nd	Round of 16
2006–07	1	2nd	Quarterfinals
2007–08	1	2nd	Finalist
2008–09	1	5th	Quarterfinals
2009–10	1	5th	Finalist
2010–11	1	2nd	Round of 16
2011–12	1	2nd	Semifinals
2012–13	1 (BeNe)	7th	Champion
2015–16	1	2nd	Finalist
2016–17	1	3th	Finalist
2017–18	1	1st	Semifinals
2018–19	1	1st	Semifinals
2019–20	1	1st	
2020–21	1	1st	
2021–22	1	1st	Champion
2022–23	1	1st	Round of 16
2023–24	1	1st	Round of 16
2024–25	1	2nd	Finalist
2025–26	1	2nd	Champion

== Continental record ==
Season	Competition	Round	Opponent	Home	Away	Aggregate
2018–19	UEFA Women's Champions League	Qualifying round	(Scotland) Glasgow City	1–2		
2018–19	UEFA Women's Champions League	Qualifying round	(Poland) Górnik Łęczna	0–1		
2018–19	UEFA Women's Champions League	Qualifying round	(Georgia (country)) Martve	0–10		
2019–20	UEFA Women's Champions League	Qualifying round	(Greece) PAOK	5–0		
2019–20	UEFA Women's Champions League	Qualifying round	(Norway) LSK Kvinner	2–3		
2019–20	UEFA Women's Champions League	Qualifying round	(Northern Ireland) Linfield	1–3		
2019–20	UEFA Women's Champions League	Round of 32	(Kazakhstan) BIIK Kazygurt	1–1^{f}	2–0	1–3
2020–21	UEFA Women's Champions League	First qualifying round	(Northern Ireland) Linfield	8–0		
2020–21	UEFA Women's Champions League	Second qualifying round	(Portugal) Benfica	1–2		
2021–22	UEFA Women's Champions League	First qualifying round	(Armenia) Hayasa	2–0		
2021–22	UEFA Women's Champions League	First qualifying round	(Croatia) Osijek	1–2		
2022–23	UEFA Women's Champions League	First qualifying round	(Poland) UKS SMS Łódź	3–2		
2022–23	UEFA Women's Champions League	First qualifying round	(Finland) KuPS	2–2 (a.e.t.) (4–3 p)		
2023–24	UEFA Women's Champions League	First qualifying round	(Poland) Katowice	5–0		
2023–24	UEFA Women's Champions League	First qualifying round	(Norway) Brann	3–0		
2024–25	UEFA Women's Champions League	First qualifying round	(Serbia) Crvena Zvezda	4–1		
2024–25	UEFA Women's Champions League	First qualifying round	(Malta) Birkirkara	0–5		
2024–25	UEFA Women's Champions League	Second qualifying round	(Norway) Vålerenga	1–2^{f}	3–0	1–5
2025–26	UEFA Women's Europa Cup	First qualifying round	(Cyprus) Aris Limassol	9–0	5–0	14–0
2025–26	UEFA Women's Europa Cup	Second qualifying round	(Portugal) Braga	1–1	3–2 (a.e.t.)	4–3
2025–26	UEFA Women's Europa Cup	Round of 16	Austria Wien	0–1	1–2	1–3
2026–27	UEFA Women's Europa Cup	First qualifying round	(Netherlands) Feyenoord	2–1	1–3	2–3

^{f} First leg.
