= Standard Liège (women) =

Belgian women's football team

Standard Fémina
- Full name: Standard de Liège (women)
- Nickname: Les Rouges
- Founded: 1971
- Ground: SL16 Football Campus, Liège
- Capacity: 800
- Chairman: 777 partners
- Manager: Stéphane Guidi
- League: Super League
- 2025–26: 3rd
| Home colours | Away colours |

Standard Fémina de Liège is Standard Liège's women's section and the most honoured women's football team in Belgium, with 17 national league titles—15 in the Belgian Women's First Division when it was the top level of women's football in the country, and two in the Super League, the current top level. Standard was also the top-placing Belgian team in all three seasons of the now-defunct BeNe League, which served as the joint top-level league for both Belgium and the Netherlands from 2012–13 to 2014–15, and won that league's overall title in its final season.

It was founded in 1971 as Saint-Nicolas FC Liège before taking its current name three years later after winning the inaugural edition of the Belgian league.

== Honours ==
=== Official ===
- Super League
  - Champions (2): 2016, 2017
- Belgian Women's First Division
  - Champions (20): 1974, 1976, 1977, 1978, 1982, 1984, 1985, 1986, 1990, 1991, 1992, 1994, 2009, 2011, 2012, 2013, 2014, 2015, 2016, 2017
- Belgian Women's Cup
  - Winners (9): 1976, 1986, 1989, 1990, 1995, 2006, 2012, 2014, 2018, 2025
- Belgian Women's Supercup
  - Winners (7): 1984, 1986, 1989, 1994, 2009, 2011, 2012
- BeNe League
  - Winners (1): 2015
  - Runners-up (2): 2013, 2014 (twice best placed Belgian team, thus national champions)
- BeNe Super Cup
  - Winners (2): 2011, 2012

=== Invitational ===
- Menton Tournament
  - Winners (1): 1982

== UEFA Competitions Record ==
In its fifth European season Standard hat to start in the qualifying.

| Season | Competition | Stage | Home | Away | Aggregate | Opponent |
|---|---|---|---|---|---|---|
| 2009–10 | Women's Champions League | Round of 32 | 0–0 | 1–3 | 1–3 | (France) Montpellier |
| 2011–12 | Women's Champions League | Round of 32 | 0–2 | 4–3 | 4–5 | (Denmark) Brøndby |
| 2012–13 | Women's Champions League | Round of 32 | 1–3 | 0–5 | 1–8 | (Germany) Turbine Potsdam |
| 2013–14 | Women's Champions League | Round of 32 | 2–2 | 1–3 | 3–5 | (Scotland) Glasgow City LFC |
| 2014–15 | Women's Champions League | Qualifying round | | | 0–1 | (Portugal) Atlético Ouriense |
| 2014–15 | Women's Champions League | Qualifying round | | | 10–0 | (Wales) Cardiff Met. |
| 2014–15 | Women's Champions League | Qualifying round | | | 1–0 | (Israel) ASA Tel Aviv |
| 2015–16 | Women's Champions League | Round of 32 | 0–2 | 0–6 | 0–8 | (Germany) 1. FFC Frankfurt |
| 2016–17 | Women's Champions League | Qualifying Round | | | 1-3 | (Belarus) FC Minsk |
| 2016–17 | Women's Champions League | Qualifying Round | | | 11–0 | (North Macedonia) ŽFK Dragon |
| 2016–17 | Women's Champions League | Qualifying Round | | | 1–1 | (Croatia) ŽNK Osijek |

== Players ==
=== Current squad ===
As of 13 July 2026

Note: Flags indicate national team as defined under FIFA eligibility rules; some limited exceptions apply. Players may hold more than one non-FIFA nationality.

| No. | Pos. | Nation | Player |
|---|---|---|---|
| 3 | DF | BEL | Loredana Humartus |
| 4 | DF | BEL | Gvantsa Tabagari |
| 8 | MF | BEL | Justine Blave |
| 11 | FW | BEL | Imani Prez |
| 14 | DF | BEL | Lyndsey Van Belle |
| 16 | FW | BEL | Ella Van Den Brande |
| 17 | FW | BEL | Emily Steijvers |
| 18 | MF | BEL | Anisa Ademi |
| 19 | DF | NED | Pam Amorij |

| No. | Pos. | Nation | Player |
|---|---|---|---|
| 26 | DF | BEL | Maude Lecoq |
| 27 | MF | BEL | Paola Tchidjo |
| 28 | MF | BEL | Chloé Snaps |
| 30 | DF | BEL | Kimberly Scohier |
| 32 | GK | BEL | Lise Musique |
| 34 | DF | BEL | Elsa Godfroid |
| 37 | MF | BEL | Gabrielle Delille |
| 39 | GK | BEL | Léna Struman |
| 77 | MF | BEL | Fleur Pauwels |
| — | FW | LVA | Anastasija Poļuhoviča (on loan from Sparta Prague) |

== Head coaches ==
- (Belgium) Mohamed Ayed (2005–2011)
- (Belgium) Henri Depireux (2011–2011)
- (Belgium) Patrick Wachel (2011–2014)
- (Belgium) Benoît Waucomont (2014–2021)
- (Belgium) Stephane Guidi (2021–current)
