= BeNe League =

- Founded: 2012
- Folded: 2015
- Country: Belgium; Netherlands
- Confederation: UEFA
- Number of clubs: 14
- Level on pyramid: 1
- Domestic cup(s): KNVB Women's Cup; Belgian Women's Cup
- International cup: UEFA Women's Champions League
- Last champions: Standard Fémina (1st title) (2014–15)
- Most championships: FC Twente (2 titles)
- Website: www.beneleague.com

The BeNe League was the highest women's football league in Belgium and the Netherlands. To increase competitiveness in their national leagues, the BeNe League was a joint cooperation between the Royal Belgian Football Association and the Royal Dutch Football Association. Its first season was played in 2012–13 following the successful cooperation with the one match BeNe Super Cup, that paired both countries' national champions. The competition qualified the highest-placed Belgian and Dutch teams to the UEFA Women's Champions League.

After three seasons the league was discontinued and both nations returned to their own top-level leagues.

== History ==
First talks of the league began in 2011. As a try-out of cooperation in 2011 the BeNe Super Cup was established. The KBVB/URBSFA approved the league on 10 December 2011. The KNVB approved the league on 13 February 2012.

UEFA then eventually gave the green light for the 2012–13 season on 23 March 2012 after its meeting of its executive committee in Istanbul.

There were some problems in the second season, with two teams not returning for the season, one going bankrupt during the season and one team folding after the season for financial reasons.

Following the third season, Belgium and the Netherlands will have their own top-level league again. The BeNe League initiative was ended because Dutch clubs and the Dutch FA failed to come to an agreement regarding the clubs' financial participation for the following seasons.

=== Champions ===
Twente won both seasons. Due to the different stages in the first season there was no official top scorer award given.

Year	Winner	Runner-up	Third	Topscorer	Notes
2012–13	FC Twente	Standard Fémina	PSV FC Eindhoven	— (not awarded)	
2013–14	FC Twente	Standard Fémina	Ajax	Vivianne Miedema (Heerenveen), 39 goals	
2014–15	Standard Fémina	FC Twente	Ajax	Tessa Wullaert (Standard), 18 goals	

== Format ==
=== Season 2012–13 ===
The League is divided in two stages. In the first stage eight Dutch and eight Belgian teams will play a national League qualifying for the second stage. The second stage is divided in the Women's BeNe League A & B.

==== BeNe League Orange & Red ====
The eight Dutch and eight Belgian teams will play a national double round-robin, thus each team playing 14 matches. The number 1 until 4 qualify for the BeNe League A, the numbers 5 until 8 qualify for the BeNe League B.

==== BeNe League A & B ====
The league consists of two Leagues (A & B) in which 16 teams take part. The top four teams of each country will advance to the BeNe League A, with the bottom four teams playing the BeNe League B. Both groups then will play another double round-robin for 14 additional matches. After that the winning team in League A is the BeNe League champion. The highest placed Belgian and Dutch team will qualify to the UEFA Women's Champions League. The lowest Belgium team will relegate to the Second Division.

=== Season 2013–14 ===
Originally, the eight Dutch and eight Belgian teams were to play in a single division in which they would play each other twice, resulting in each team playing 30 matches. However, Belgian side K. St-Truidense VV withdrew from the league before the start of the season, which meant that the season would start with 15 teams. Dutch side FC Utrecht went bankrupt on 21 January 2014 and played their final match three days later; the league soon decreed that all matches played by Utrecht would be deleted from the season table. Since the home-and-away schedule was retained, all 14 remaining teams eventually played 26 matches that counted toward the league standings.

In addition to the above clubs, Royal Antwerp announced it would leave the league for financial reasons upon the completion of the 2013–14 season.

== See also ==
- BeNe Super Cup
- Dutch Eredivisie (women)
- Belgian Women's First Division (preceded the BeNe League)
- Belgian Super League Vrouwenvoetbal (followed the BeNe League)
