= Women's Belgian Cup =

Belgian Women's Cup
- Founded: 1977
- Region: Belgium
- Teams: 64
- Current champions: Standard Fémina de Liège (2025)
- Most championships: RSC Anderlecht (11 titles)
- Website: Official (in French)

The Belgian Women's Cup (Dutch: Beker van België Vrouwen; French: Coupe de Belgique féminine; German: Belgischer Pokal für Frauen) is the cup competition for women's football in Belgium. The Royal Belgian Football Association established the cup in 1977.

== List of finals ==
The following is a list of all finals:

Year	Winner	Runner-up	Result
1977	Astro Begijnendijk	St. Fémina Liège	0-0 (pen 7-6)
1978	Astro Begijnendijk	Sefa Dames Herentals	1-1 (pen 4-3)
1979	Astro Begijnendijk	Lady's Scherpenheuvel	3-0
1980	Sefa Dames Herentals	Herk Sport	2-1
1981	KSV Cercle Brugge	Lady's Scherpenheuvel	3-0
1982	RWD Herentals	Standard Fémina de Liège	4-0
1983	Herk Sport	RWD Herentals	3-2
1984	Brussel D71	Astro Begijnendijk	2-0
1985	Brussel D71	FC 't Rozeke Ekeren-Donk	4-0
1986	Standard Fémina de Liège	Eva's Kontich	3-0
1987	Brussel D71	RWD Herentals	2-1
1988	Herk Sport	DVC Kuurne	4-0
1989	Standard Fémina de Liège	Brussel D71	2-0
1990	Standard Fémina de Liège	Brussel D71	1-1 (pen 3-2)
1991	Brussel D71	Standard Fémina de Liège	2-1
1992	Herk Sport	Standard Fémina de Liège	2-0
1993	K.F.C. Rapide Wezemaal	Herk Sport	2-1
1994	R.S.C. Anderlecht	Herk Sport	3-0
1995	St. Fémina de Liège	R.S.C. Anderlecht	3-1
1996	R.S.C. Anderlecht	Elen Standard	4-1
1997	K.F.C. Rapide Wezemaal	Sinaai Girls	3-0
1998	R.S.C. Anderlecht	K.S.C. Eendracht Aalst	4-1
1999	R.S.C. Anderlecht	K.F.C. Rapide Wezemaal	3-1
2000	K.S.C. Eendracht Aalst	Kumtich	7-0
2001	K.F.C. Rapid Wezemaal	Sinaai Girls	4-1
2002	K.S.C. Eendracht Aalst	Eva's Kumtich	4-1
2003	K.F.C. Rapide Wezemaal	VC Eendracht Aalst	8-1
2004	K.F.C. Rapide Wezemaal	R.S.C. Anderlecht	1-1 (pen 3-1)
2005	R.S.C. Anderlecht	DVC Zuid-West Vlaanderen	3-0
2006	St. Fémina de Liège	K.F.C. Rapide Wezemaal	6-3
2007	K.F.C. Rapide Wezemaal	DVC Zuid-West Vlaanderen	3-0
2008	K. SK Tienen	RSC Anderlecht	1-1 (pen 5-4)
2009	Sinaai Girls	Standard Fémina de Liège	2-0
2010	Sinaai Girls	R.S.C.Anderlecht	1-1 (pen 4-3)
2011	Sinaai Girls	Lierse SK	2-1
2012	St. Fémina de Liège	Lierse	3-2
2013	Anderlecht	WB Sinaai Girls	3-0 a.e.t.
2014	St. Fémina de Liège	Club Brugge	5-0
2015	Lierse SK	Club Brugge	1-0 a.e.t.
2016	Lierse SK	Anderlecht	2-1
2017	AA Gent	Anderlecht	3-1
2018	St. Fémina de Liège	Ladies Genk	2-0
2019	AA Gent	St. Fémina de Liège	2-0
2022	Anderlecht	Standard Fémina de Liège	3-0
2023	Standard Fémina de Liège	Racing Genk	3-0
2024	Club YLA	Oud-Heverlee Leuven	1-1 (pen 4-2)
2025	Standard Fémina de Liège	Anderlecht	1-0

=== Most wins ===
Team	Wins
R.S.C. Anderlecht (includes 4 titles as Brussel D71)	11
Standard Fémina de Liège	10
K.F.C. Rapide Wezemaal	6
Sinaai Girls, Herk Sport, Astro Begijnendijk	3
RWD Herentals, K.S.C. Eendracht Aalst, Lierse SK, AA Gent	2
Sefa Dames Herentals, KSV Cercle Brugge, K. SK Tienen, Club YLA	1

== See also ==
- Football in Belgium
