= Sofie Van Houtven =

Belgian footballer

Sofie van Houtven
Personal information
- Full name: Sofie van Houtven
- Date of birth: 3 August 1987 (age 39)
- Place of birth: Bonheiden, Belgium
- Position: Goalkeeper

Team information
- Current team: Genk Ladies

Senior career*
Years	Team	Apps	(Gls)
2009	Standard Liège		
2012–2013	Beerschot		
2014–2015	OH Leuven		
2016–	Genk Ladies		

International career^{‡}
2008–	Belgium	25	(0)
- * Club domestic league appearances and goals ‡ National team caps and goals as of 23 October 2016

Sofie van Houtven (born 3 August 1987) is a Belgian footballer. She plays as a goalkeeper for Genk Ladies and the Belgium women's national football team.

== International statistics ==
As of 13 June 2017

Belgium
Year	Apps	Goals
2008	2	0
2009	4	0
2010	2	0
2011	6	0
2012	2	0
2013	2	0
2014	3	0
2015	0	0
2016	2	0
2017	2	0
Total	25	0

== Honours ==
Standard Liège

- Belgian Women's Super League: 2008–09, 2010–11
- Belgian Women's Cup: 2005–06
- Belgian Women's Super Cup: 2008–09
