= Tamara Cassimon =

Belgian footballer and manager

Personal information
- Full name: Tamara Cassimon
- Date of birth: October 23, 1975 (age 51)
- Place of birth: Belgium

Team information
- Current team: Belgium

Senior career*
Years	Team	Apps	(Gls)
?	SK Steenhuffel	?	(?)
?	Opdorp	?	(?)
?	SK Londerzeel	?	(?)
?	Brussel Dames 71	?	(?)
?	Davo Puurs	?	(?)
?	Ladies Willebroek	?	(?)
?	DVK Haacht	?	(?)
?	DVC Land van Grimbergen	?	(?)
Total		?	(?)

Managerial career
- 2003–05: SK Oetingen
- 2005–07: Oud-Heverlee Leuven
- 2007–11: Sinaai Girls
- 2011–17: Belgium U17
- 2011–17: Belgium (Assistant)
- 2017–: Fémina White Star Woluwe
- * Club domestic league appearances and goals

Tamara Cassimon (born 23 October 1975) is a Belgian football manager and former player.

== Biography ==
Cassimon is for many years active in women's football. She played in the highest division at Brussels Dames 71 and DVK Haacht. But early in her career she had to give up playing due several serious injuries.

In 2003 she decided to become a manager at SK Oetingen in the 1e Provincial Division in Vlaams Brabant. In her first year she and the team made the promotion to the 3rd Division. In December 2005 she became manager of Oud-Heverlee Leuven, she became the youngest manager in the highest division.

From December 2007 until 2011 she was manager of Sinaai Girls. In the last 3 seasons she managed Sinaai she won 3 times in a row the Belgian Cup. In 2009 against Standard Fémina de Liège, in 2010 against RSC Anderlecht and in 2011 against WD Lierse SK.

She left 2011 Sinaai to become Assistant coach of Ives Serneels with the Belgian Red Flames and de young Flames U17. In addition she's active for the Women's Football Department of the RBFA.

May 2017 she announced that after the 2017 European Championship in The Netherlands she would leave the Red Flames to manage Fémina White Star Woluwe because she misses to perform on a weekly basis.

== Awards ==
=== As manager ===
- Belgian Cup: 2009, 2010, 2011
