= Amber Tysiak =

Belgian footballer (born 2000)

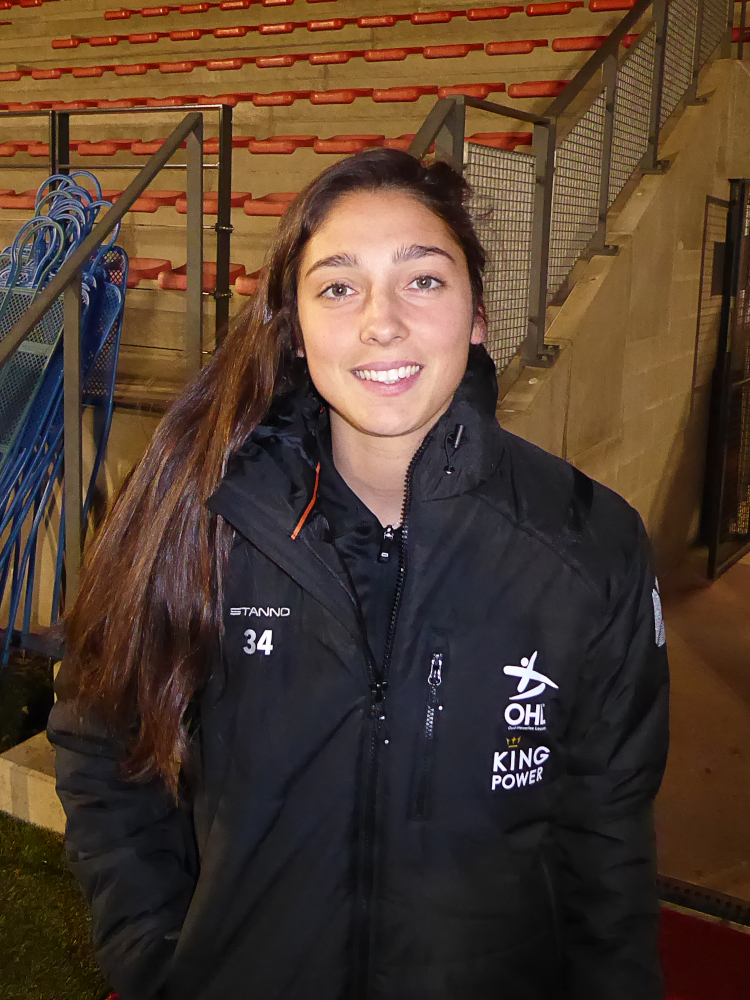
- Tysiak in 2022

Personal information
- Date of birth: 26 January 2000 (age 26)
- Place of birth: Houthalen-Helchteren, Belgium
- Height: 1.77 m (5 ft 10 in)
- Position: Defender

Team information
- Current team: Union Berlin
- Number: 26

Youth career
- KFC Helson Helchteren

Senior career*
Years	Team	Apps	(Gls)
2016–2020	Genk		
2020–2023	OH Leuven	52	(5)
2023–2026	West Ham United	49	(4)
2026-	Union Berlin	22	(1)

International career^{‡}
2015–2017	Belgium U17	8	(0)
2017–2019	Belgium U19	16	(0)
2021–	Belgium	53	(7)
- * Club domestic league appearances and goals as of 15 October 2026 ‡ National team caps and goals as of 20 November 2026

Amber Tysiak (Polish: [ˈambɛr ˈtɨɕak]; born 26 January 2000) is a Belgian professional footballer who plays as a defender for Bundesliga club Union Berlin and the Belgium national team.

== Early life ==
Tysiak was born in Houthalen-Helchteren and is of Italian and Polish descent. She started playing football around the age of 5, with the boys at KFC Helson (Helchteren).

== Club career ==
After playing four seasons with Genk, Tysiak transferred to Oud-Heverlee Leuven in April 2020.

Tysiak finished runner-up in the Belgian Women's Super League three seasons in a row with OH Leuven, in 2020-21, 2021–22 and 2022–23.

In January 2023, Tysiak joined English Women's Super League club West Ham United.

On 15 January 2026, it was announced that Tysiak had transferred from West Ham to Frauen-Bundesliga club FC Union Berlin.

== International career ==
Tysiak first got called up for a Belgium U16 international match on 28 November 2015 for a friendly game against Germany. She subsequently became a regular at youth games and captained the U19 squad during the 2019 U19 Euros in Scotland, where Belgium went out in the group stage.

Tysiak made her debut for the Belgium national team on 18 February 2021, in a 6–1 friendly defeat by the Netherlands at King Baudouin Stadium in Brussels.

At the start of 2022, Tysiak helped Belgium win the Pinatar Cup in Spain for the first time, beating Russia on penalties in the final after a 0–0 draw.

She scored her first goal, and her first hat-trick, for the senior national team on 25 November 2021, during a 19–0 record win against Armenia as part of the 2023 FIFA Women's World Cup qualification campaign.

Tysiak was named in the Belgium squad for UEFA Women's Euro 2022 in England, where the Red Flames were beaten in the quarter-finals 1–0 by Sweden. She went on to contribute to Belgium's successful qualification for UEFA Women's Euro 2025 via the play-offs, starting both legs of the play-off final against Ukraine.

On 11 June 2025, Tysiak was called up to the Belgium squad for the UEFA Women's Euro 2025.

== Personal life ==
Tysiak has a bachelor's degree in secondary education teaching. Originally she combined football with a job as a teacher. At the start of the 2022/23 season she put her job on hold and plays full-time at OH Leuven and the national team. She has a brother who is three years her senior.

== Honours ==
Belgium

- Pinatar Cup: 2022

== Career statistics ==
=== Club ===
As of match played 20 November 2026

Appearances and goals by club, season and competition
Club	Season	League			National cup (Note: Includes Belgian Women's Cup, Women's FA Cup)		League cup (Note: Includes FA Women's League Cup)		Total	
Club	Season	Division	Apps	Goals	Apps	Goals	Apps	Goals	Apps	Goals
Genk	2016–17	Belgian Women's Super League	?	?	?	?	—		?	?
Genk	2017–18	Belgian Women's Super League	?	?	?	?	—		?	?
Genk	2018–19	Belgian Women's Super League	?	?	?	?	—		?	?
Genk	2019–20	Belgian Women's Super League	15	2	?	?	—		15	2
Genk	Total		15	2	?	?	—		15	2
Oud-Heverlee Leuven	2020–21	Belgian Women's Super League	24	1	?	?	—		24	1
Oud-Heverlee Leuven	2021–22	Belgian Women's Super League	17	2	?	?	—		17	2
Oud-Heverlee Leuven	2022–23	Belgian Women's Super League	11	2	1	0	—		12	2
Oud-Heverlee Leuven	Total		52	5	1	0	—		53	5
West Ham United	2022–23	Women's Super League	4	0	0	0	0	0	4	0
West Ham United	2023–24	Women's Super League	17	1	1	0	2	0	20	1
West Ham United	2024–25	Women's Super League	20	2	1	0	1	0	22	2
West Ham United	2025–26	Women's Super League	8	1	0	0	4	0	12	1
West Ham United	Total		49	4	2	0	7	0	58	4
1. FC Union Berlin	2025–26	Frauen-Bundesliga	12	1	0	0	—		12	1
1. FC Union Berlin	2026–27	Frauen-Bundesliga	10	0	1	0	—		11	0
1. FC Union Berlin	Total		22	1	2	0	—		24	1
Career total			138	12	5	0	7	0	150	12

=== International ===
As of match played 13 October 2026

Appearances and goals by national team and year
National team	Year	Apps	Goals
Belgium	2021	10	3
Belgium	2022	9	2
Belgium	2023	3	0
Belgium	2024	10	0
Belgium	2025	15	0
Belgium	2026	6	2
Total		53	7

Scores and results list Belgium's goal tally first, score column indicates score after each Tysiak goal.

List of international goals scored by Amber Tysiak
No.	Date	Venue	Opponent	Score	Result	Competition
1	25 November 2021	Den Dreef, Leuven, Belgium	Armenia	4–0	19–0	2023 FIFA Women's World Cup qualification
2	25 November 2021	Den Dreef, Leuven, Belgium	Armenia	6–0	19–0	2023 FIFA Women's World Cup qualification
3	25 November 2021	Den Dreef, Leuven, Belgium	Armenia	13–0	19–0	2023 FIFA Women's World Cup qualification
4	28 June 2022	Herman Vanderpoortenstadion, Lier, Belgium	Luxembourg	3–1	6–1	Friendly
5	28 June 2022	Herman Vanderpoortenstadion, Lier, Belgium	Luxembourg	5–1	6–1	Friendly
6	9 June 2026	Stade de la Frontière, Esch-sur-Alzette, Luxembourg	Luxembourg	2–0	7–0	2027 FIFA Women's World Cup qualification
7	9 June 2026	Stade de la Frontière, Esch-sur-Alzette, Luxembourg	Luxembourg	4–0	7–0	2027 FIFA Women's World Cup qualification
