= 2026–27 Belgian Women's Super League =

Ninth season of the top Belgian women's association football league

Belgian Women's Super League
- Season: 2026–27
- Dates: 5 September 2026 – 23 May 2027
- Matches: 24
- Goals: 74 (3.08 per match)
- All statistics correct as of Pre-season.

The 2026–27 Belgian Women's Super League season is the 12th edition since its establishment in 2015. It is the 56th edition of the highest level of women's football in Belgium.

== Teams ==
In comparison to the previous season, Westerlo is no longer taking part as they decided to voluntarily leave the Women's Super League to invest instead in youth football. They were replaced by Les Louviéroises.

Locations of the 2026-27 Belgian Super League teams

=== Stadia and locations ===
| Club | Home city | Home ground | Capacity |
|---|---|---|---|
| RSC Anderlecht | Anderlecht | Belgian Football Center, Tubize | 1,000 |
| Genk | Genk | SportinGenk Park, Genk | 2,000 |
| KAA Gent Ladies | Ghent | PGB-Stadion, Ghent | 6,500 |
| Les Louviéroises | La Louvière | Easi Arena, La Louvière | 8,050 |
| Club YLA | Bruges | Municipal Sports Center, Aalter | 1,500 |
| Oud-Heverlee Leuven | Leuven | OHL Banqup Campus, Oud-Heverlee (Note: Some matches played at Den Dreef.) | 3,330 |
| Standard Liège | Liège | Stade Maurice Dufrasne, Liège | 27,670 |
| Zulte-Waregem | Zulte | Municipal Sports Stadium, Zulte | 2,500 |

== Regular competition ==
| Pos | Team | Pld | W | D | L | GF | GA | GD | Pts | Qualification |
|---|---|---|---|---|---|---|---|---|---|---|
| 1 | Anderlecht Women | 9 | 8 | 0 | 1 | 23 | 5 | +18 | 24 | Qualification for Champions play-offs |
| 2 | Club YLA | 9 | 6 | 3 | 0 | 20 | 7 | +13 | 21 | Qualification for Champions play-offs |
| 3 | Genk Ladies | 10 | 5 | 2 | 3 | 12 | 10 | +2 | 17 | Qualification for Champions play-offs |
| 4 | Les Louviéroises | 10 | 4 | 4 | 2 | 14 | 9 | +5 | 16 | Qualification for Champions play-offs |
| 5 | OH Leuven Women | 10 | 3 | 5 | 2 | 20 | 9 | +11 | 14 | Qualification for Play-offs 2 |
| 6 | Standard Femina | 10 | 4 | 0 | 6 | 11 | 24 | −13 | 12 | Qualification for Play-offs 2 |
| 7 | Essevee Women | 10 | 1 | 0 | 9 | 9 | 21 | −12 | 3 | Qualification for Play-offs 2 |
| 8 | Gent Ladies | 10 | 1 | 0 | 9 | 6 | 30 | −24 | 3 | Qualification for Play-offs 2 |

Updated to match(es) played on 21 November 2026. Source: proleague.be
Rules for classification: 1) points; 2) matches won; 3) goal difference; 4) goals scored; 5) away matches won; 6) away goal difference; 7) away goals made

=== Results ===
| Home \ Away | AND | YLA | GNK | LAL | OHL | STA | ZWA | GNT | AND | YLA | GNK | LAL | OHL | STA | ZWA | GNT |
|---|---|---|---|---|---|---|---|---|---|---|---|---|---|---|---|---|
| Anderlecht Women | — | PPD (Note: With both Anderlecht and Club YLA having multiple players selected for the 2027 UEFA Women's Under-17 Championship qualification matches between 13 and 19 November, the match between both teams was postponed.) | 4–0 | 2–0 | 3–1 | 16 Jan | 2–0 | 12 Dec | — | — | 20 Feb | 20 Mar | — | 13 Feb | 30 Jan | — |
| Club YLA | 3–1 | — | 1–0 | 12 Dec | 1–1 | 3–1 | 9 Jan | 5–0 | 23 Jan | — | — | — | 20 Feb | — | 20 Mar | 30 Jan |
| Genk Ladies | 0–2 | 16 Jan | — | 1–1 | 0–0 | 18 Dec | 11 Dec | 2–0 | — | 13 Feb | — | — | — | 30 Jan | — | 20 Mar |
| Les Louviéroises | 19 Dec | 2–2 | 9 Jan | — | 1–1 | 4–0 | 1–0 | 3–2 | — | 13 Mar | 6 Feb | — | — | — | — | 23 Jan |
| OH Leuven Women | 9 Jan | 1–1 | 1–2 | 0–0 | — | 12 Dec | 4–0 | 6–1 | 13 Mar | — | 23 Jan | 30 Jan | — | — | — | 13 Feb |
| Standard Femina | 0–4 | 0–2 | 0–2 | 1–0 | 0–5 | — | 1–0 | 9 Jan | — | 6 Feb | — | 20 Feb | 20 Mar | — | 23 Jan | — |
| Essevee Women | 1–3 | 1–2 | 1–2 | 16 Jan | 19 Dec | 3–4 | — | 0–1 | — | — | 13 Mar | 13 Feb | 6 Feb | — | — | — |
| Gent Ladies | 0–2 | 19 Dec | 0–3 | 0–2 | 16 Jan | 1–4 | 1–3 | — | 6 Feb | — | — | — | — | 13 Mar | 20 Feb | — |

Updated to match(es) played on 21 November 2026. Source: proleague.com
Legend: Blue = home team win; Yellow = draw; Red = away team win.

== Play-offs ==
=== Championship Play-offs ===
The top four teams after the regular season take part in the Championship Play-offs, with their points halved (rounded up).

| Pos | Team | Pld | W | D | L | GF | GA | GD | Pts | Qualification | TBD | TBD | TBD | TBD |
|---|---|---|---|---|---|---|---|---|---|---|---|---|---|---|
| 1 | TBD | 0 | 0 | 0 | 0 | 0 | 0 | 0 | 0 | Qualification for the Champions League second qualifying round | — | | | |
| 2 | TBD | 0 | 0 | 0 | 0 | 0 | 0 | 0 | 0 | Qualification for the Champions League second qualifying round | | — | | |
| 3 | TBD | 0 | 0 | 0 | 0 | 0 | 0 | 0 | 0 | Qualification for the Europa Cup first qualifying round | | | — | |
| 4 | TBD | 0 | 0 | 0 | 0 | 0 | 0 | 0 | 0 | | | | | — |

First match(es) will be played: 2 April 2027. Source: proleague.com
Legend: Blue = home team win; Yellow = draw; Red = away team win.
Rules for classification: 1) Points; 2) Points without (possible) half points added due to rounding; 3) Regular season finishing position

=== Play-offs 2 ===
The bottom four teams after the regular season take part in the Play-offs 2, with their points halved (rounded up).

| Pos | Team | Pld | W | D | L | GF | GA | GD | Pts | TBD | TBD | TBD | TBD |
|---|---|---|---|---|---|---|---|---|---|---|---|---|---|
| 1 | TBD | 0 | 0 | 0 | 0 | 0 | 0 | 0 | 0 | — | | | |
| 2 | TBD | 0 | 0 | 0 | 0 | 0 | 0 | 0 | 0 | | — | | |
| 3 | TBD | 0 | 0 | 0 | 0 | 0 | 0 | 0 | 0 | | | — | |
| 4 | TBD | 0 | 0 | 0 | 0 | 0 | 0 | 0 | 0 | | | | — |

First match(es) will be played: 2 April 2027. Source: proleague.com
Legend: Blue = home team win; Yellow = draw; Red = away team win.
Rules for classification: 1) points; 2) goal difference; 3) goals scored

== Season statistics ==
=== Top goalscorers ===
Includes matches up to 21 November 2026:

| Rank | Player | Club | Goals |
|---|---|---|---|
| 1 | (Belgium) Esthée Maerschalck | Anderlecht Women | 7 |
| 2 | (France) Amélie Delabre | Club YLA | 5 |
| 3 | (Netherlands) Sanne Arons | Les Louviéroises | 4 |
| 3 | (Suriname) Jada Conijnenberg | OH Leuven Women | 4 |
| 3 | (Lithuania) Rimantė Jonušaitė | Anderlecht Women | 4 |
| 3 | (Belgium) Imani Prez | Standard Femina | 4 |
| 7 | (Morocco) Rania Boutiebi | Club YLA | 3 |
| 7 | (Belgium) Kadhiya De Ceuster | OH Leuven Women | 3 |
| 7 | (Belgium) Gwen Duijsters | Genk Ladies | 3 |
| 7 | (Belgium) Lily Hoekx | OH Leuven Women | 3 |
| 7 | (Netherlands) Lieke Vis | Club YLA | 3 |

2 goals (19 players)
- (Iceland) Andrea Rut Bjarnadóttir (Anderlecht Women)
- (Iceland) Vigdís Lilja Kristjánsdóttir (Anderlecht Women)
- (Belgium) Isabelle Iliano (Club YLA)
- (Belgium) Margaux Martlé (Club YLA)
- (Belgium) Daisy Baudewijns (Essevee Women)
- (Belgium) Amber Bert (Essevee Women)
- (Belgium) Laura Lezeure (Essevee Women)
- (Netherlands) Lieke De Bie (Genk Ladies)
- (Netherlands) Emely Van Der Vliet (Genk Ladies)
- (Belgium) Emma Van Britsom (Gent Ladies)
- (Belgium) Fleur Van Daele (Gent Ladies)
- (Belgium) Romy Camps (Les Louviéroises)
- (France) Lia Galodé (Les Louviéroises)
- (Netherlands) Fleur Huisman (Les Louviéroises)
- (Netherlands) Dechamaily Lont (Les Louviéroises)
- (Netherlands) Jeslynn Kuijpers (OH Leuven Women)
- (Greece) Ioanna Papatheodorou (OH Leuven Women)
- (Belgium) Maëline Louis (Standard Femina)
- (Belgium) Paola Tchidjo (Standard Femina)
1 goal (33 players)
- (Belgium) Wies Dehaemers (Anderlecht Women)
- (Belgium) Karlijn Helsen (Anderlecht Women)
- (Slovakia) Michaela Martišková (Anderlecht Women)
- (Belgium) Lina Meeuwis (Anderlecht Women)
- (Belgium) Marie Minnaert (Anderlecht Women)
- (Belgium) Shari Van Belle (Anderlecht Women)
- (Romania) Ștefania Vătafu (Anderlecht Women)
- (Belgium) Luz De Wolf (Club YLA)
- (Belgium) Liesanne Loose (Club YLA)
- (Belgium) Clementine Reynebeau (Club YLA)
- (Netherlands) Amber Van Heeswijk (Club YLA)
- (Belgium) Loes Van Mullem (Club YLA)
- (Belgium) Marith Decabooter (Essevee Women)
- (Belgium) Kiki Peeters (Essevee Women)
- (Belgium) Lisa Vanhentenrijk (Essevee Women)
- (Netherlands) Robine De Ridder (Genk Ladies)
- (Belgium) Zoë Kasongo (Genk Ladies)
- (Belgium) Jinthe Schepers (Genk Ladies)
- (Belgium) Sien Vandersanden (Genk Ladies)
- (Belgium) Luna Vanhoudt (Genk Ladies)
- (Belgium) Fleur Heyman (Gent Ladies)
- (Belgium) Caitlin Lievens (Gent Ladies)
- (Morocco) Djennah Cherif (Les Louviéroises)
- (Belgium) Sharmel Libotte (Les Louviéroises)
- (Belgium) Alixe Bosteels (OH Leuven Women)
- (Netherlands) Isabella Dekker (OH Leuven Women)
- (Netherlands) Kim Everaerts (OH Leuven Women)
- (Belgium) Saar Janssen (OH Leuven Women)
- (United States) Camille Lafaix (OH Leuven Women)
- (France) Agathe Ollivier (OH Leuven Women)
- (Belgium) Justine Blave (Standard Femina)
- (Belgium) Ella Van Den Brande (Standard Femina)
- (Indonesia) Isa Warps (Standard Femina)
1 own goal (2 players)
- (Belgium) Isabelle Iliano (Club YLA, scored for Anderlecht Women)
- (Belgium) Hanne Hellinx (Essevee Women, scored for Anderlecht Women)
