= List of Belgian women's football champions =

The champions of Belgium in women's football today are the Super League winners, a league of seven teams created in 2015.

Previously the title was awarded to the play-off winners of the regional leagues (1972–1973), the winners of the First Division (1974–2012) and the best placed Belgian team of the cross-border BeNe League with the Netherlands.

Clubs were actually crowned Belgian champions as early as in the 1920s and 1930s. The first championship of the modern era was won by Astro Begijnendijk (now KSK Heist) in 1972 and the most titles today have been won by Standard Liège with 20 titles.

== The early years (1920/30s) ==
The first women's football club in Belgium was the Brussels Feminina Club created in August 1921. Several others followed, but then in 1922 the Royal Belgian Football Association banned all women's football clubs. Nevertheless, women's football flourished and the club Atalante de Jette even played national team from France and Great Britain.

Year	Champions
1924	Union Sportive Innovation
1925	Union Sportive Innovation
1926	Brussels Fémina Club
1927	Ghent Fémina Club
1928	Atalante de Jette
1929	William Elie Club
1930	William Elie Club
1931	Atalante de Jette
1932	Atalante de Jette
1933	Atalante de Jette
1934	Atalante de Jette

== First Division (1972–2012) ==
The championship was first contested in 1972. It was played in three divisions. After the season the three division winners met in a three-round group to play for the championship. In 1973 four divisional winners met in a two-legged semi-final and a one-off final. In both years Astro Begijnendijk were victorious. Since 1974 the league was played in a single division as double round robin with no play-offs.

From 1977 a national cup was played, the Beker van België (Belgian Women's Cup).

Key

#	Won play-off tournament against other regional league winners
†	Champion also won Belgian Women's Cup (the double)

Year	Winner	Runner up	Third	Notes
1971–72	Astro Begijnendijk #	St-Nicolas FC Liège	Gosselies Sport	3 team group
1972–73	Astro Begijnendijk #	HO Merchtem	n/a	0–0 (5–3 pen.)
1973–74	St-Nicolas FC Liège			
1974–75	Astro Begijnendijk			
1975–76	Standard Fémina de Liège			
1976–77	Standard Fémina de Liège			
1977–78	Standard Fémina de Liège			
1978–79	Herk Sport			
1979–80	Sefa Dames Herentals †			
1980–81	Cercle Brugge †			
1981–82	Standard Fémina de Liège			
1982–83	RWD Herentals			
1983–84	Standard Fémina de Liège			
1984–85	Standard Fémina de Liège			
1985–86	Standard Fémina de Liège †			
1986–87	Brüssel D. 71 †			
1987–88	RWD Herentals			
1988–89	Herk Sport			
1989–90	Standard Fémina de Liège †			
1990–91	Standard Fémina de Liège			
1991–92	Standard Fémina de Liège			
1992–93	Herk Sport			
1993–94	Standard Fémina de Liège			
1994–95	RSC Anderlecht			
1995–96	Eendracht Aalst			
1996–97	RSC Anderlecht			
1997–98	RSC Anderlecht †			
1998–99	Eendracht Aalst			
1999–00	Eendracht Aalst †	RSC Anderlecht	KFC Rapide Wezemaal	
2000–01	Eendracht Aalst			
2001–02	Eendracht Aalst †	KFC Rapide Wezemaal	Standard Fémina de Liège	
2002–03	SK Lebeke-Aalst	KFC Rapide Wezemaal	Standard Fémina de Liège	
2003–04	KFC Rapide Wezemaal †	RSC Anderlecht	Eva's Kumtich	
2004–05	KFC Rapide Wezemaal	Eva's Kumtich	RSC Anderlecht	
2005–06	KFC Rapide Wezemaal	RSC Anderlecht	DVC Zuid-West Vlaanderen	
2006–07	KFC Rapide Wezemaal †	RSC Anderlecht	K. Vlimmeren Sport	
2007–08	KVK Tienen †	RSC Anderlecht	FCL Rapide Wezemaal	
2008–09	Standard Fémina de Liège	KVK Tienen	K. Sint-Truidense VV	
2009–10	K. Sint-Truidense VV	Standard Fémina de Liège	Sinaai Girls	
2010–11	Standard Fémina de Liège	RSC Anderlecht	Lierse SK	
2011–12	Standard Fémina de Liège †	RSC Anderlecht	Lierse SK	

== BeNe League (2013–2015) ==
The BeNe League was played three seasons, it consisted of eight Belgian and eight Dutch clubs. The title of Belgian champions and the associated UEFA Women's Champions League spot, were given to the best placed Belgian team after the season.

The only Belgian side playing for the top spots were Standart Liège, finishing runners-up to Twente twice before winning the league in 2014–15. The second best Belgian team was ranked 6th or worse at the end of the season. The BeNe League initiative was ended because Dutch clubs and the Dutch FA failed to come to an agreement regarding the clubs' financial participation for the following seasons. The Dutch FA also questioned the lack of competitiveness.

Season	Belgian champion	Position	Second best	Position	League winners
2012–13	Standard Fémina	2nd	WD Lierse	6th	FC Twente (Netherlands)
2013–14	Standard Fémina †	2nd	RSC Anderlecht	8th	FC Twente (Netherlands)
2014–15	Standard Fémina	Champions	WD Lierse	7th	Standard Fémina

== Super League (2015–present) ==
The Super League Vrouwenvoetbal was created in 2015, after the BeNe League was stopped. In the 2015-16 inaugural season, eight teams participated. In contrast to the First Division the format changed from a double round robin to a two staged season. Teams played a double round-robin in the first stage. After that points were halved and the top four placed and bottom placed teams played another double round-robin for a total of 20 games.

After the 2015–16 season, Lierse chose not to participate, dropping the league to seven members for 2016–17. The two-stage season was abandoned, and each team now plays the others four times for a total of 24 games.

Season	Champions	Runners-up	Third	Top scorer	Goals
2015–16	Standard Liège	WD Lierse SK	RSC Anderlecht	Jana Coryn (Lierse)	19
2016–17	Standard Liège	RSC Anderlecht	AA Gent Ladies	Sanne Schoenmakers (Standard)	26
2017–18	RSC Anderlecht	AA Gent Ladies	KRC Genk Ladies	Ella Van Kerkhoven (Anderlecht)	27
2018-19	RSC Anderlecht	Standard Liège	KRC Genk Ladies	Ella Van Kerkhoven (Anderlecht)	21
2019-20	RSC Anderlecht	Standard Liège	AA Gent Ladies	Sanne Schoenmakers (Standard)	12
2020-21	RSC Anderlecht	OH Leuven	AA Gent Ladies	Tessa Wullaert (Anderlecht)	38
2021-22	RSC Anderlecht	OH Leuven	Standard Liège	Tessa Wullaert (Anderlecht)	35
2022-23	RSC Anderlecht	OH Leuven	Standard Liège	Ella Van Kerkhoven (OH Leuven)	21
2023-24	RSC Anderlecht	Standard Liège	OH Leuven	Dilja Zomers (OH Leuven)	20
2024–25	Oud-Heverlee Leuven	RSC Anderlecht	Standard Liège	Davinia Vanmechelen (Club YLA)	16

== Championships won by club ==
The championships have been won by ten different clubs.

Titles	Team	Years
20	Standard de Liège (incl. 1 as St-Nicolas FC Liège)	1974, 1976–78, 1982, 1984–86, 1990–92, 1994, 2009, 2011–17
11	RSC Anderlecht (incl. 1 Brüssel D. 71)	1987, 1995, 1997, 1998, 2018–24
5	Eendracht Aalst	1996, 1999–2002
5	Sint-Truidense VV (incl. 4 as KFC Rapide Wezemaal)	2004–07, 2010
3	Astro Begijnendijk	1972, 1973, 1975
3	RWD Herentals (incl. Sefa Dames Herentals)	1980, 1983, 1988
3	Herk Sport	1979, 1989, 1993
1	Cercle Brügge	1981
1	SK Lebeke-Aalst	2003
1	KVK Tienen	2008
1	Oud-Heverlee Leuven	2025

== See also ==
- Belgian football champions
