= Marlies Verbruggen =

Belgian footballer

Personal information
- Date of birth: 8 January 1988 (age 38)
- Place of birth: Aartselaar, Belgium
- Position: Midfielder

Senior career*
Years	Team	Apps	(Gls)
–2013	Sint-Truidense	27+	(6+)
2013–2014	Royal Antwerp	25	(2)
2014–2015	Oud-Heverlee Leuven		
2015–2018	Anderlecht		

International career
- Belgium U19
–2016	Belgium	41	
- * Club domestic league appearances and goals

Marlies Verbruggen (born 8 January 1988) is a Belgian footballer, who has represented the national side on 41 occasions. At club level, she most recently played for Anderlecht.

== Club career ==
Verbruggen was part of the Sint-Truidense team that won the 2009–10 Belgian Women's First Division. In 2013, Verbruggen signed for Beerschot AC, who were playing in the BeNe League. Prior to the 2013–14 season starting, the team moved to Antwerp and became Royal Antwerp, and Verbruggen captained Antwerp in the 2013–14 season. Verbruggen played for Oud-Heverlee Leuven in the 2014–15 BeNe League.

In November 2015, Verbruggen scored for Anderlecht in a match against her former team Oud-Heverlee Leuven. She was later part of the Anderlecht team that lost the 2016 Belgian Women's Cup Final to Lierse SK, and lost the 2017 Final to Gent. Anderlecht won the 2017–18 Belgian Women's Super League; Verbruggen missed the latter part of that season as she was pregnant. She scored a goal in a November 2017 match where Anderlecht beat KSK Heist 14–0.

== International career ==
Verbuggen represented Belgium under-19s at the 2006 UEFA Women's Under-19 Championship. She made a total of 41 appearances for the Belgium senior side, with her last appearance being in March 2016. She was in the Belgium squad for UEFA Women's Euro 2017 qualifying matches in 2015, and the 2016 Algarve Cup.

== Personal life ==
Verbruggen is originally from Aartselaar, and later lived in Sint-Katelijne-Waver. In 2018, Verbruggen had a baby.
