= 2023–24 Belgian Women's Super League =

Eighth season of the top Belgian women's association football league

Belgian Women's Super League
- Season: 2023–24
- Dates: 25 August 2023 – 26 May 2024
- Champions: Anderlecht
- Relegated: none
- Biggest home win: Leuven 8–1 Charleroi; Standard Liège 8–1 Mechelen
- Biggest away win: Zulte-Waregem 2–5 Leuven
- All statistics correct as of 26 September 2023.

The 2023–24 Belgian Women's Super League season was the 9th edition since its establishment in 2015. It was the 53rd edition of the highest level of women's football in Belgium. It was played from August 25 2023 until May 26 2024. For the first time the league was organised by the Pro League. Anderlecht won their seventh consecutive title.

== Team changes ==
=== Out ===
- Eendracht Aalst Ladies were relegated after finishing in last place. They were not replaced and the league returned to ten teams.

== Format Changes ==
For the first time the competition will be organised by the Pro League, the league reduced from eleven to ten teams after Eendracht Aalst opted not to apply for a license to compete this season.

The six teams that are ranked highest after the regular season will compete in a Play-Off consisting of ten match days, points will be halved echoing the system used in the men's competition. The winner will be crowned the national champion and will qualify for the UEFA Women's Champions League.

The bottom four teams will compete in a play-off also having their points halved, however, no team will be relegated from the Super League this season providing that they all apply for a licence for next season as the League is set to expand to twelve teams in the 2024-25 season.

== Teams ==
Locations of the 2023-24 Belgian Super League teams

=== Stadia and locations ===
Club	Home city	Home ground	Capacity
RSC Anderlecht	Anderlecht	Belgian Football Center, Tubize	1,000
Genk	Genk	SportinGenk Park, Genk	2,000
AA Gent Ladies	Ghent	PGB-Stadion, Ghent	6,500
Club YLA	Bruges	Municipal Sports Center, Aalter	1,500
Oud-Heverlee Leuven	Leuven	OHL Banqup Campus, Oud-Heverlee	3,330
Standard Liège	Liège	Stade Maurice Dufrasne, Liège	27,670
Zulte-Waregem	Zulte	Municipal Sports Stadium, Zulte	2,500
Mechelen	Mechelen	Kontich	
RCS Charleroi	Charleroi	Marcinelle Complex, Marcinelle	1,000
FWS Woluwe	Brussels	Fallon Stadion, Woluwe-Saint-Lambert	3,500

== Standings ==
=== Regular competition ===
Pos	Team	Pld	W	D	L	GF	GA	GD	Pts	Qualification	OHL	STL	AND	YLA	GNK	GNT	ZWA	CHA	MEC	WOL
1	Oud-Heverlee Leuven	18	14	1	3	58	19	+39	43	Qualification for Play-Off 1	—	3–2	0–1	1–0	1–0	4–1	3–0	8–1	5–0	4–1
2	Standard Liège	18	14	1	3	39	12	+27	43	Qualification for Play-Off 1	3–0	—	2–1	3–0	2–1	2–0	1–0	1–1	8–1	3–0
3	RSC Anderlecht	18	13	3	2	50	16	+34	42	Qualification for Play-Off 1	1–3	3–2	—	1–1	4–1	2–0	1–0	6–0	4–1	4–0
4	Club YLA	18	9	4	5	34	23	+11	31	Qualification for Play-Off 1	5–3	0–1	2–2	—	2–2	0–2	3–0	4–1	5–0	4–1
5	Ladies Genk	18	9	3	6	38	22	+16	30	Qualification for Play-Off 1	1–1	0–1	3–4	2–4	—	0–0	2–0	3–0	4–1	8–0
6	AA Gent Ladies	18	9	2	7	27	22	+5	29	Qualification for Play-Off 1	1–4	1–0	0–0	1–0	0–1	—	0–2	3–1	6–2	3–0
7	Zulte-Waregem	18	5	2	11	18	26	−8	17	Qualification for Play-Off 2	2–5	0–1	1–2	0–1	0–2	3–2	—	1–1	3–0	3–1
8	RCS Charleroi	18	2	4	12	14	49	−35	10	Qualification for Play-Off 2	0–3	0–2	0–5	0–0	1–2	1–3	0–0	—	3–2	0–2
9	Mechelen	18	2	1	15	18	61	−43	7	Qualification for Play-Off 2	0–3	1–3	0–5	0–1	1–2	0–2	0–3	4–2	—	4–1
10	FWS Woluwe	18	2	1	15	8	54	−46	7	Qualification for Play-Off 2	0–4	0–2	0–4	0–2	0–4	0–2	1–0	0–2	1–1	—

Source: vbal4
Legend: Blue = home team win; Yellow = draw; Red = away team win.
Rules for classification: 1) points; 2) goal difference; 3) goals scored

== Play-offs 1 ==
Pos	Team	Pld	W	D	L	GF	GA	GD	Pts	Qualification	AND	STL	OHL	YLA	GNT	GNK
1	RSC Anderlecht (C)	10	8	2	0	29	6	+23	47	Qualification for UEFA Women's Champions League	—	0–0	2–0	5–0	5–2	4–2
2	Standard Liège	10	7	2	1	23	10	+13	45		2–2	—	0–3	5–1	3–0	4–2
3	Oud-Heverlee Leuven	10	6	1	3	31	12	+19	41		0–1	0–1	—	1–0	7–0	8–0
4	Club YLA	10	2	2	6	10	23	−13	24		0–2	2–4	3–3	—	0–2	1–0
5	AA Gent Ladies	10	2	1	7	10	28	−18	22		0–3	0–2	3–4	0–2	—	1–1
6	Ladies Genk	10	0	2	8	9	33	−24	17		0–5	0–2	2–5	1–1	1–2	—

Source: vbal4
Legend: Blue = home team win; Yellow = draw; Red = away team win.
Rules for classification: 1) points; 2) regular season position
(C) Champions

== Play-offs 2 ==
Pos	Team	Pld	W	D	L	GF	GA	GD	Pts	CHA	ZWA	WOL	MEC
1	RCS Charleroi	6	3	2	1	9	6	+3	16	—	1–1	2–1	1–3
2	Zulte Waregem	6	1	3	2	5	5	0	15	1–1	—	0–1	1–1
3	FWS Woluwe	6	3	0	3	5	9	−4	13	0–3	1–0	—	2–0
4	Mechelen	6	2	1	3	8	7	+1	11	0–1	0–2	4–0	—

Source: vbal4
Legend: Blue = home team win; Yellow = draw; Red = away team win.
Rules for classification: 1) points; 2) goal difference; 3) goals scored

== Statistics ==
=== Top Goalscorers ===
Rank	Player	Club	Goals
1	(Iceland) Dilja Zomers	Oud-Heverlee Leuven	17
2	(France) Amélie Delabre	RSC Anderlecht	14
2	(Netherlands) Nikée van Dijk	Oud-Heverlee Leuven	14
4	(Belgium) Davinia Vanmechelen	Club YLA	13
5	(Republic of Ireland) Amber Barrett	Standard Liège	12
5	(Belgium) Lore Jacobs	RSC Anderlecht	12
7	(Belgium) Gwen Duijsters	Ladies Genk	9
8	(Belgium) Marie Detruyer	Oud-Heverlee Leuven	8
8	(Belgium) Noémie Gelders	Standard Liège	8
8	(Belgium) Mariam Abdulai Toloba	Standard Liège	8
8	(Belgium) Amber Maximus	Gent	8
