= 2018–19 Belgian Women's Super League =

Belgian Women's Super League
- Season: 2018–19
- Matches: 45
- Goals: 202 (4.49 per match)
- Top goalscorer: Amber Maximus (14 goals)
- Biggest home win: Anderlecht 12–0 Heist
- Biggest away win: Heist 0–10 Standard Liège
- Highest scoring: Anderlecht 12–0 Heist
- All statistics correct as of 17 February 2019.

The 2018–19 Belgian Women's Super League season was the eleventh edition since its establishment in 2015. Anderlecht were the defending champions.

== Teams ==
Location of the 2018–19 Belgian Super League teams

=== Stadia and locations ===
Club	Location	Venue	Capacity
RSC Anderlecht	Anderlecht	Centre National de Football Euro 2000	1,000
Ladies Genk	Genk	SportinGenk Park	2,000
AA Gent Ladies	Ghent	PGB-Stadion	6,500
KSK Heist	Heist-op-den-Berg	KSK Heist Terrein 1	1,000
Oud-Heverlee Leuven	Heverlee	Gemeentelijk Stadion	3,330
Standard Fémina de Liège	Liège	Académie Robert Louis-Dreyfus	1,000

== League Standings ==
In the first stage teams play each other four times, for 20 matches each.

=== League table ===
Pos	Team	Pld	W	D	L	GF	GA	GD	Pts	Qualification or relegation
1	RSC Anderlecht	16	12	3	1	57	11	+46	39	Qualification for Championship Round
2	AA Gent Ladies	15	10	3	2	55	15	+40	33	Qualification for Championship Round
3	Standard Fémina de Liège	15	6	5	4	35	13	+22	23	Qualification for Championship Round
4	Ladies Genk	15	5	6	4	37	23	+14	21	Qualification for Championship Round
5	Oud-Heverlee Leuven	15	3	3	9	17	35	−18	12	Relegation Play-off
6	KSK Heist	16	0	0	16	2	106	−104	0	Relegation Play-off

Updated to match(es) played on 17 February 2019. Source: Vrouwenvoetbalkrant
Rules for classification: 1) points; 2) goal difference; 3) goals scored

== Season statistics ==
=== Top scorers ===
Updated to match(es) played on 7 December 2018.

Rank	Player	Club	Goals
1	(Belgium) Amber Maximus	AA Gent Ladies	14
2	(Belgium) Ella Van Kerkhoven	RSC Anderlecht	13
3	(Belgium) Sarah Wijnants	RSC Anderlecht	8
4	(Belgium) Silke Leynen	Ladies Genk	7
5	(Belgium) Anaëlle Wiard	Oud-Heverlee Leuven	6
