= 2020–21 Belgian Women's Super League =

Sixth season of the top Belgian women's association football league

Belgian Women's Super League
- Season: 2020–21
- Dates: 28 August 2020 – 29 May 2021
- Champions: Anderlecht
- UEFA Women's Champions League: Anderlecht
- Matches: 180
- Goals: 334 (1.86 per match)
- Top goalscorer: Tessa Wullaert(28 goals)
- Biggest home win: Anderlecht 10–0 Genk
- Biggest away win: Zulte-Waregem 0–11 Anderlecht
- Highest scoring: Zulte-Waregem 0–11 Anderlecht
- Longest winning run: 17 matches Anderlecht
- Longest unbeaten run: 17 matches Anderlecht
- All statistics correct as of 26 May 2022.

The 2020-21 Belgian Women's Super League season was the 6th edition since its establishment in 2015. It started on 28 August 2020 and final was played on 29 May 2021. However, the competition was cut short due to a COVID-19 outbreak.
Anderlecht were the defending champions.

== Changes from 2019-20 ==
In light of further professionalising women's football in Belgium, several changes were introduced through RBFA's "The World at our Feet" project.
The six teams of the previous years (Anderlecht, Club YLA, AA Gent, KRC Genk, OH Leuven and Standard Liège) were joined by both champion and runner-up of the 1st National division: Eendracht Aalst and White Star Woluwe respectively. Zulte-Waregem and Charleroi completed the list of 10 teams, ensuring a larger geographical spread of the women's teams at the highest level.
The Women's Super League also received a brand new visual identity and logo. Interactive content is provided via new Facebook , Instagram and Twitter accounts.

All 10 teams play each other twice in a regular competition, for a total of 18 matches. The final standings are than divided in 2 groups, with the top 5 teams competing in Play-off 1 and the bottom 5 in Play-off 2.
Each team in each Play-off starts with half their points from the regular competition, rounded up. The 5 teams than play a total of 8 matches to determine the final rankings.

== Teams ==
Locations of the 2020-21 Belgian Super League teams

=== Stadia and locations ===
Club	Home city	Home ground	Capacity
RSC Anderlecht	Anderlecht	Belgian Football Center, Tubize	1,000
Genk	Genk	SportinGenk Park, Genk	2,000
AA Gent Ladies	Ghent	PGB-Stadion, Ghent	6,500
Club YLA	Bruges	Municipal Sports Center, Aalter	1,500
Oud-Heverlee Leuven	Leuven	OHL Banqup Campus, Oud-Heverlee	3,330
Standard Liège	Liège	Stade Maurice Dufrasne, Liège	27,670
Zulte-Waregem	Zulte	Municipal Sports Stadium, Zulte	2,500
Eendracht Aalst Ladies	Aalst	Pierre Cornelisstadion, Aalst	4,500
RCS Charleroi	Charleroi	Marcinelle Complex, Marcinelle	1,000
FWS Woluwe	Brussels	Fallon Stadion, Woluwe-Saint-Lambert	3,500

== Standings ==
=== Regular competition ===
Pos	Team	Pld	W	D	L	GF	GA	GD	Pts	Qualification	AND	STL	GNT	OHL	YLA	GNK	WOL	AAL	ZWA	CHA
1	RSC Anderlecht	18	17	0	1	95	5	+90	51	Qualification for Play-off 1	—	2–0	5–0	4–0	5–0	10–0	0–1	9–0	5–0	8–0
2	Standard Liège	18	14	0	4	46	19	+27	42	Qualification for Play-off 1	0–5	—	0–2	6–2	2–1	4–0	1–0	2–0	5–1	2–0
3	AA Gent Ladies	18	11	1	6	40	20	+20	34	Qualification for Play-off 1	0–1	1–3	—	0–1	2–0	1–0	1–1	3–0	0–1	4–0
4	Oud-Heverlee Leuven	18	11	1	6	38	31	+7	34	Qualification for Play-off 1	1–8	0–2	0–3	—	2–0	3–0	4–1	2–1	2–0	7–0
5	Club YLA	18	8	2	8	31	34	−3	26	Qualification for Play-off 1	2–3	1–4	3–2	0–4	—	5–2	3–0	6–1	0–0	2–0
6	Ladies Genk	18	6	2	10	26	40	−14	20	Qualification for Play-off 2	1–4	1–3	2–3	2–0	4–0	—	0–2	3–0	1–1	3–1
7	FWS Woluwe	18	4	6	8	18	30	−12	18	Qualification for Play-off 2	0–4	1–4	1–2	1–1	1–1	2–1	—	0–0	1–2	3–1
8	Eendracht Aalst Ladies	18	4	3	11	18	42	−24	15	Qualification for Play-off 2	0–4	1–0	1–4	1–2	0–2	0–3	1–1	—	1–1	6–0
9	Zulte-Waregem	18	3	4	11	15	45	−30	13	Qualification for Play-off 2	0–11	1–2	0–3	2–4	1–2	1–3	3–1	0–2	—	1–2
10	RCS Charleroi	18	1	3	14	7	68	−61	6	Qualification for Play-off 2	0–7	0–6	1–9	0–3	1–3	0–0	1–1	0–3	0–0	—

Source: Voetbalexpress
Rules for classification: 1) points; 2) goal difference; 3) goals scored

=== Play-off 1 ===
Pos	Team	Pld	W	D	L	GF	GA	GD	Pts	Qualification	AND	OHL	GNT	STL	YLA
1	RSC Anderlecht (C)	6	4	2	0	19	4	+15	40	UEFA Champions League	—	2–0	2–0	6–1	canc.
2	Oud-Heverlee Leuven	8	6	1	1	17	7	+10	36		0–0	—	4–2	2–1	3–0
3	AA Gent Ladies	7	4	0	3	11	13	−2	29		canc.	1–3	—	2–1	2–1
4	Standard Liège	8	1	0	7	10	28	−18	24		2–7	1–4	0–1	—	3–1
5	Club YLA	7	1	1	5	11	16	−5	17		2–2	0–1	2–3	5–2	—

Source: Voetbalexpress
Rules for classification: 1) points; 2) goal difference; 3) goals scored
(C) Champions

=== Play-off 2 ===
Pos	Team	Pld	W	D	L	GF	GA	GD	Pts	AAL	GNK	ZWA	CHA	WOL
1	Eendracht Aalst Ladies	8	5	1	2	19	13	+6	24	—	5–3	0–3	2–0	2–0
2	Ladies Genk	8	4	2	2	17	15	+2	24	3–3	—	2–0	2–1	2–0
3	Zulte-Waregem	8	5	1	2	13	8	+5	23	3–2	2–2	—	2–0	1–0
4	RCS Charleroi	8	3	0	5	9	11	−2	12	0–2	2–0	0–2	—	4–1
5	FWS Woluwe	8	1	0	7	6	17	−11	12	1–3	2–3	2–0	0–2	—

Source: Voetbalexpress
Rules for classification: 1) points; 2) goal difference; 3) goals scored

== Top goalscorers ==
=== Regular competition ===
Rank	Player	Club	Goals
1	(Belgium) Tessa Wullaert	Anderlecht	28
2	(Belgium) Tine De Caigny	Anderlecht	22
3	(Belgium) Marie Minnaert	Club YLA	11
3	(Netherlands) Sanne Schoenmakers	Standard Liège	11
5	(Belgium) Gwen Duijsters	Genk	10
6	(Belgium) Hanne Eurlings	OH Leuven	9
6	(Belgium) Noémie Gelders	Standard Liège	9
6	(Netherlands) Lobke Loonen	Gent	9
9	(Netherlands) Jolet Lommen	Gent	8
10	(Belgium) Ella Van Kerkhoven	Gent	7
10	(Belgium) Davinia Vanmechelen	Standard Liège	7

=== Play-off 1 ===
Rank	Player	Club	Goals
1	(Belgium) Tessa Wullaert	Anderlecht	8
2	(Belgium) Charlotte Laridon	Club YLA	4
2	(Belgium) Elke Van Gorp	Anderlecht	4
2	(Netherlands) Lobke Loonen	Gent	4
2	(Belgium) Marie Detruyer	OH Leuven	4
2	(Belgium) Marie Minnaert	Club YLA	4

=== Play-off 2 ===
Rank	Player	Club	Goals
1	(Belgium) Gwen Duijsters	Genk	8
2	(Belgium) Hanne Merkelbach	Genk	5
2	(Belgium) Justine Blave	Aalst	5
4	(Belgium) Geena-Lisa Buyle	Zulte-Waregem	4
4	(Belgium) Stephanie Van Gils	Aalst	4
