= RAAL La Louvière (women) =

Belgian football club

- Full name: Royal Association Athlétique Louviéroise La Louvière
- Nickname: Les Louviéroises
- Founded: 2017
- Ground: Easi Arena, La Louvière
- Capacity: 8,050
- Chairman: Salvatore Curaba
- Manager: Audrey Demoustier
- League: Super League
- Website: https://www.raal.be/raal-women/

RAAL La Louvière (Women), is a Belgian women's football club from La Louvière. The women's team is part of football club RAAL La Louvière, which is affiliated with the KBVB (Belgian Football Association) under registration number 94. The first team competes in the Super League, the highest Belgian level, for the first time in the 2026-2027 season.

== History ==
At the relaunch of football club RAAL La Louvière in 2017, chairman Salvatore Curaba already expressed the ambition to reach the highest level with a women's team as well.
However, the women's team had to start in the provincial Hainaut leagues, where it remained active until 2024.

In the 2024/25 season, the La Louvière Women played at the national level for the first time in the Interprovincial ACFF and immediately became champions with 62 points out of 66. The following 2025/26 season in the First Division was concluded in third place behind Oud-Heverlee Leuven B and RSC Anderlecht B.
Because B teams cannot be promoted to the Super League, La Louvière was the first candidate for this promotion. A spot had indeed become available in the Super League because KVC Westerlo Ladies had decided to voluntarily step down to the First Division. La Louvière decided to take the chance and so the first women's team started competing at the highest level from the 2026/27 season.

== Season to season ==
Season	Tier	Division	Place	Belgian Cup
2020–21	5	Second Provincial Hainaut	-	
2021–22	5	Second Provincial Hainaut	1st	
2022–23	4	First Provincial Hainaut	2nd	
2023–24	4	First Provincial Hainaut	1st	
2024–25	3	Second Division	1st	
2025–26	2	First Division	3rd	1/8 final
2026–27	1	Super League	-	-
