= Lowiese Seynhaeve =

Belgian footballer

Personal information
- Date of birth: 29 December 1999 (age 26)
- Place of birth: Belgium
- Position: Goalkeeper

Team information
- Current team: OH Leuven
- Number: 29

Youth career
- SC Menen
- Club YLA
- Gent

Senior career*
Years	Team	Apps	(Gls)
–2021	Anderlecht	5	(0)
2021–2024	Essevee	71	(0)
2024–	OH Leuven	47	(0)

International career^{‡}
2015	Belgium U16	2	(0)
2024–2016	Belgium U17	5	(0)
2015–2018	Belgium U19	3	(0)
2022–2025	Belgium U23	2	(0)
2026–	Belgium	3	(0)
- * Club domestic league appearances and goals as of 4 October 2026 ‡ National team caps and goals as of 15 October 2026

Lowiese Seynhaeve (born 29 December 1999) is a Belgian professional footballer who plays as a goalkeeper for Belgian Women's Super League club OH Leuven and the Belgium national team.

Seynhaeve made her professional debut for Anderlecht during the 2020–21 season, playing five games, before moving to Essevee where she was a starter in the following three seasons, before moving to OH Leuven. At OH Leuven, Seynhaeve was part of the team that became back-to-back champions, the first ever titles for the Leuven based team. She was also part of the team that qualified for the league stage of the UEFA Women's Champions League in both the 2025–26 and 2025–26 seasons, where she had some standout performances, even winning the player of the match trophy in a 1–1 home draw with AS Roma.

== Honours ==
OH Leuven

- Belgian Women's Super League: 2024–25, 2025–26
