= Inge Heiremans =

Belgian footballer

Personal information
- Full name: Inge Heiremans
- Date of birth: 9 June 1981 (age 45)
- Place of birth: Belgium
- Position: Striker

Team information
- Current team: KV Mechelen

College career
Years	Team	Apps	(Gls)
2000–2001	Lindenwood Lions		
2002–2003	Jacksonville Dolphins		

Senior career*
Years	Team	Apps	(Gls)
–2000	Rapide Wezemaal		
2001	FH	11	(5)
2002	Tampa Bay Extreme		
2004–2005	Wolfsburg	12	(2)
2005–2008	Rapide Wezemaal		
2008–2010	Sint-Truidense		
2010–2012	Lierse		
2012–2013	Sint-Truidense		
2014–2017	KSK Heist		
2017–2018	KV Mechelen		

International career^{‡}
1996–1999	Belgium U19	13	(8)
1997–2012	Belgium	44	(6)
- * Club domestic league appearances and goals as of 15 May 2017 ‡ National team caps and goals as of 8 August 2012

Inge Heiremans is a Belgian football striker currently playing for KV Mechelen in the Belgian Second Division. She has also played for Rapide Wezemaal and K. Sint-Truidense VV (Belgian First Division), Lindenwood Lions and Jacksonville Dolphins (NCAA), FH (Úrvalsdeild), Tampa Bay Extreme (W-League), VfL Wolfsburg (Bundesliga) and KSK Heist (Super League). She first played the European Cup in 2006 with Rapide Wezemaal. Heiremans retired in 2018.

She was a member of the Belgian national team.
