= Joseph d'Oultremont =

Belgian patron, sports manager, and politician

Personal information
- Full name: Joseph Antoine Marie Émile Henri d'Oultremont de Wégimont and Warfusée
- Date of birth: 15 August 1877
- Place of birth: Amay, Belgium
- Date of death: 7 October 1942 (aged 65)
- Place of death: Xhos Castle, Belgium
- Position: Full-back

Senior career*
Years	Team	Apps	(Gls)
1897–1898	Léopold FC		
1st president of Belgian Hockey Association
In office 1912–1913
Succeeded by	Victor de Laveleye
2nd president of the Belgian Football Association
In office 1924–1929
Preceded by	Édouard de Laveleye
Succeeded by	Rodolphe Seeldrayers
- * Club domestic league appearances and goals

Count Joseph d'Oultremont de Wégimont and Warfusée (15 August 1877 – 7 October 1942) was a Belgian patron, sports manager and politician. He was the first chairman of the Belgian Hockey Association (1912–1913), and also the second president of Belgian Football Association (1924–1929). In his youth, he played football, notably at the Royal Léopold Football Club, and practiced cricket.

== Early and personal life ==
Joseph Antoine Marie Émile Henri (known as Joë) d'Oultremont de Wégimont and Warfusée was born in Amay on 15 August 1877, as the only son of Eugène d'Oultremont de Wégimont and Warfusée and Clotilde (1844–1889), and Countess Eugénie van den Steen de Jehay (1850–1932).

He studied at St. Augustin's College in Ramsgate, England, and then at the Fathers Josephites College in Melle, near Ghent. After obtaining his diplomas, he traveled around the world and spent some time in China, where he was offered an interesting position with a Belgian company. Back in Belgium, he took charge of several important agricultural companies in Beusdael and other companies.

D'Oultremont married the (Dutch) Countess Isabelle de Geloes (1884–1960) in Eysden (Netherlands) in 1904, and they had three sons and a daughter. He is thus the father-in-law of the ambassador Édouard Ullens de Schooten Whettnall.

== Sporting career ==
As a sportsman, d'Oultremont was strongly attracted to football, horse riding, hockey, and cricket. He learned to play football at the college in Ramsgate, and in 1895 and 1896, he was a member of the school team in Melle, of which he was also captain for two years. He founded Football Club Melle, and then helped found Bressoux Football Club (L'Espoir de Bressoux) within the Rosaire parish in Bressoux (later RUL Seraing), of which he became chairman. In 1897, he became a member of Léopold FC, where he played as a half-back until a knee injury ended his active career in 1898, at the age of 31.

D'Oultremont devoted himself mainly to sports organizations, becoming the first president of the Royal Belgian Hockey Association in 1912–13. However, he was mainly interested in football organizations, being a member of the General Council of the 'Union Belge' between 1910 and 1913. As chairman of the Commission for Professionalism, he was charged with a radical purification of football, but his main activity was within the selection committee which named players for the Belgian national team, for which he was a member between 1908 and 1920. He chaired the selection committee for the football tournament at the 1920 Olympic Games in Antwerp, which was won by Belgium, the country's first trophy.

In 1924, after many years in the leadership of the national team, d'Oultremont became the second president of Belgian Football Association, succeeding Édouard de Laveleye. He proved himself to be a capable, decisive, and incorruptible leader, but after five years, he resigned in 1929, and was replaced by Rodolphe Seeldrayers.

== Other endeavours ==
Upon the death of his uncle Florent, who died unmarried in 1898, d'Oultremont inherited the Kasteel van Beusdael, a castle in the hamlet of Beusdael in the sub-municipality of Sippenaeken, Liège. From the moment he arrived in the village of Beusdael, the young Count d'Oultremont declared himself to be its new patron, both generous and omnipresent. And in fact, he became a benefactor of the Saint-Lambert shooting society, and together with three other people from the village, he replenished its coffers, which had been battered and weakened by the war years. He eventually became the lord of the manor of Beusdael.

As the president of RUL Seraing, d'Oultremont organized football tournaments with regional teams in 1925, which enhanced the program of the Sippenaeken fair. He also served as the mayor of Tavier, where his castle of Xhos was located.

== Death ==
D'Oultremont died on 7 October 1942, at the age of 65.
