= Charlotte Tison =

Belgian footballer

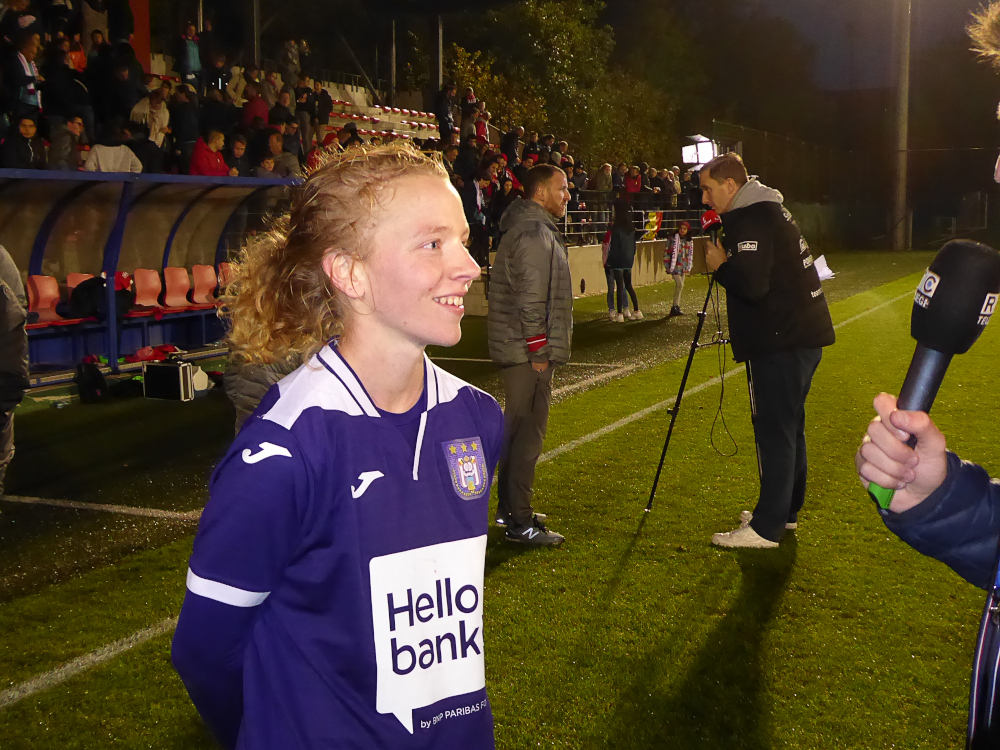
- Tison in 2019

Personal information
- Full name: Charlotte Tison
- Date of birth: 21 April 1998 (age 28)
- Place of birth: Etterbeek, Belgium,
- Height: 1.65 m (5 ft 5 in)
- Position: Midfielder

Team information
- Current team: Genk
- Number: 20

Senior career*
Years	Team	Apps	(Gls)
2014–2016	Standard Liège	0	(0)
2016–2023	Anderlecht	87	(11)
2023–	Genk	25	(1)

International career^{‡}
2014–2015	Belgium U17	5	(0)
2015–2017	Belgium U19	13	(0)
2017–	Belgium	13	(0)
- * Club domestic league appearances and goals as of 16 July 2023 (UTC) ‡ National team caps and goals as of 19:20, 3 July 2022

Charlotte Tison (born 21 April 1998) is a Belgian footballer who plays as a midfielder for the Belgium women's national team.

== Playing career ==
Tison won six league titles in a row with Anderlecht, sweeping the Belgian Women's Super League from the 2017–18 season right through to 2023–24.

At the start of 2022, Tison helped Belgium win the Pinatar Cup in Spain for the first time, beating Russia on penalties in the final after a 0–0 draw.

== Honours ==
Anderlecht

- Belgian Women's Super League: 2017–18, 2018–19, 2019–20, 2020–21, 2021–22, 2022–23
- Belgian Women's Cup: 2022

Belgium

- Pinatar Cup: 2022
