= Émile de Laveleye =

Belgian economist, professor, historian

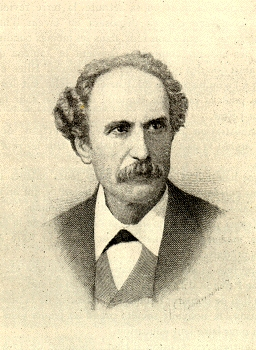
- Born: Émile Louis Victor de Laveleye; 5 April 1822; Bruges, United Kingdom of the Netherlands
- Died: 3 January 1892 (aged 69); Havelange, Belgium
- Education: Katholieke Universiteit Leuven
- Occupations: Professor, historian, economist
- Children: Édouard de Laveleye; Marguerite de Laveleye

Émile Louis Victor de Laveleye (5 April 1822 – 3 January 1892) was a Belgian economist. He was one of the co-founders of the Institut de Droit International in 1873.

== Biography ==
De Lavaleye was born in Bruges, and educated there and at the Collège Stanislas in Paris, a celebrated establishment in the hands of the Oratorians.

He continued his studies at the Catholic University of Louvain and afterwards at Ghent, where he came under the influence of François Huet the philosopher and Christian Socialist. In 1844 he won a prize with an essay on the language and literature of Provence. In 1847, he published L'Histoire des rois francs, and in 1861 a French version of the Nibelungenlied, but though he never lost his interest in literature and history, his most important work was in the domain of economics.

He was one of a group of young lawyers doctors and critics, all old pupils of Huet, who met once a week to discuss social and economic questions and thus was led to publish his views on these subjects. In 1859 some articles by him in the Revue des deux mondes laid the foundation of his reputation as an economist. In 1864 he was elected to the chair of political economy at the state University of Liège. Here he wrote his most important works:

- La Russie et l'Autriche depuis Sadowa, 1870.
- Essai sur les Formes de Gouvernement dans les Sociétés Modernes, 1872.
- Des Causes Actuelles de Guerre en Europe et de l'Arbitrage, 1874.
- De la Proprieté et de ses Formes Primitives (1 ed.). 1874 – via Gallica. (dedicated to the memories of John Stuart Mill and François Huet)

He was elected to honorary membership of the Manchester Literary and Philosophical Society on 19 april 1887 at the AGM.

== Death and legacy ==
He died at the Doyon Castle (in present-day Havelange), near Liège on 3 January 1892.

Laveleye's activity included the whole realm of political science, political economy, monetary questions, international law, foreign and Belgian politics, questions of education, religion and morality, travel and literature. He had the art of popularizing even the most technical subjects, owing to the clearness of his view and his firm grasp of the matter in hand. He was especially attracted to England, where he thought he saw many of his ideals of social, political and religious progress realized. He was a frequent contributor to the English newspapers and leading reviews. The most widely circulated of his works was a pamphlet on Le Parti clérical en Belgique, of which 2,000,000 copies had been circulated in ten languages by the beginning of the 20th century.

== Works in English translation ==
- On the Causes of War, and the Means of Reducing Their Number. London: Peace Society. 1872. p. 1 – via Internet Archive.
- Protestantism and Catholicism in their Bearing upon the Liberty and Prosperity of Nations. Toronto: Belford Bros., 1876.
- Primitive Property; With an Introduction by T. E. Cliffe Leslie. Translated by Marriott, G . R. L. London: Macmillan and Co. 1878 – via Internet Archive.
- The New Tendencies of Political Economy. New York: The Banker's Magazine and Statistical Register, 1879.
- International Bimetallism and the Battle of the Standard. London: P.S. King, 1881.
- Common-place Fallacies Concerning Money. London: P.S. King. 1882 – via Internet Archive.
- Regulated Vice in Relation to Morality. London: K. Paul, Trench, 1884.
- The Elements of Political Economy. New York: G.P. Putnam's Sons, 1886.
- Letters from Italy. London: T. Fisher Unwin, 1886.
- The Socialism of Today. London: Field and Tuer, 1886.
- The Balkan Peninsula; Edited and Revised for the English Public by the Author; With an Introductory Chapter Upon the Most Recent Events and a Letter from the Right Honourable W. P. Gladstone M.P. Translated by Mrs. Thorpe. London: T. Fisher Unwin. 1887.
- Luxury. London: George Allen & Company, 1920.

=== Selected articles ===
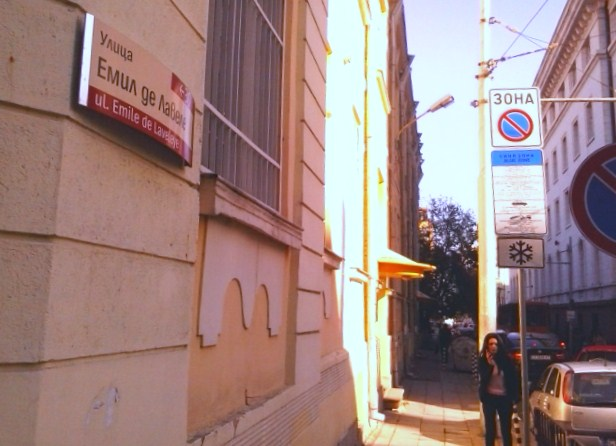
Émile Louis Victor de Laveleye Street in Sofia, Bulgaria (42°41.700′N 23°19.148′E)

- "Land System of Belgium and Holland." In: Systems of Land Tenure in Various Countries. London: Macmillan & Co., 1870.
- "The Future of France," The Fortnightly Review, Vol. XIV, 1870.
- "On the Causes of War, and the Means of Reducing their Number." In: Cobden Club Essays. London: Cassell, Petter & Galpin, 1872.
- "The Clerical Party in Belgium," The Fortnightly Review, Vol. XVIII, 1872.
- "Causes of War in the Existing European Situation," The Fortnightly Review, Vol. XIX, 1873.
- "The Provincial and Communal Institutions of Belgium and Holland." In: Local Government and Taxation. London: Cassell Petter & Galpin, 1875.
- "Commonplace Fallacies Concerning Money," Part II, The Contemporary Review, Vol. XL, July/December 1881.
- "The Progress of Socialism," The Contemporary Review, Vol. XLIII, January/June 1883.
- "The Congo Neutralized," The Contemporary Review, Vol. XLIII, January/June 1883.
- "The Prospects of the Republic in France," The Contemporary Review, Vol. XLIV, December 1883.
- "Würzburg and Vienna," Part II, The Contemporary Review, Vol. XLVI, November/December 1884.
- "A Criticism of Mr. Herbert Spencer," The Contemporary Review, Vol. XLVII, January/June 1885.
- "Pessimism on the Stage," The Contemporary Review, Vol. XLVIII, July/December 1885.
- "The Economic Crisis and its Causes," The Contemporary Review, Vol. XLIX, January/June 1886.
- "The Situation in the East". The Contemporary Review. L: 609–619. November 1886 – via Internet Archive.
- "Civil Government and the Papacy," The Forum, Vol. V, April 1888.
- "The Future of Religion," The Contemporary Review, Vol. LIV, July/December 1888.
- "Perils of Democracy," The Forum, Vol. VII, 1889.
- "Two New Utopias," The Contemporary Review, Vol. LVII, January/June 1890.
- "Communism," The Contemporary Review, Vol. LVII, January/June 1890.
- "The Division of Africa," The Forum, Vol. X, 1891.
- "The Foreign Policy of Italy," The Contemporary Review, Vol. LXI, February 1892.
