= Marie Detruyer =

Belgian footballer (born 2004)

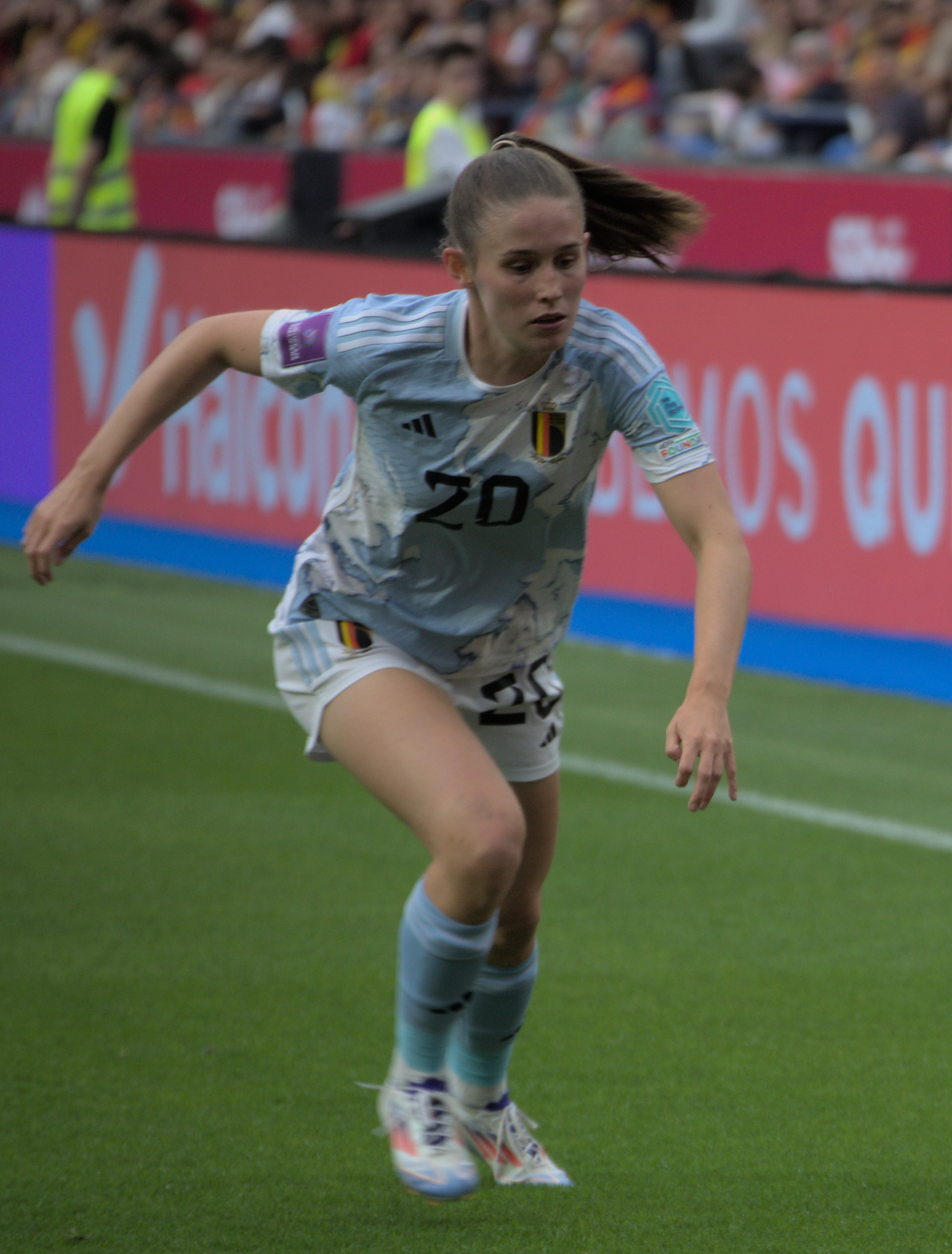
- Detruyer in 2024

Personal information
- Date of birth: 13 January 2004 (age 22)
- Place of birth: Belgium,
- Position: Midfielder

Team information
- Current team: Inter Milan
- Number: 20

Senior career*
Years	Team	Apps	(Gls)
2020–2024	OH Leuven	105	(44)
2024–	Inter Milan	43	(2)

International career^{‡}
2021–	Belgium	38	(5)
- * Club domestic league appearances and goals as of 3 October 2026 (UTC) ‡ National team caps and goals as of 15 October 2026

Marie Detruyer (born 13 January 2004) is a Belgian footballer who plays as a midfielder for Serie A club Inter Milan and the Belgium national team.

== Club Career ==
Originally from Dilbeek, Marie Detruyer started playing football at the age of five at Verbroedering Beersel-Drogenbos.

When she was 10 years old, she took part in a training session at the Voetbalacademie-Net in the Osbroek park in Aalst with some teammates from Verbroedering Beersel-Drogenbos. It was following this training that she was spotted by Michaël De Meyst, former Eendracht Aalst player and youth coach. Impressed by what she could do with a ball, she was used in videos to show technical exercises.

De Meyst contacted his former club in Aalst to take her on, and despite having a policy of not playing girls, took her in for a training session. Impressed, the club was immediately convinced of her potential. This is how Marie becomes the first girl to play in the boys' teams of Eendracht.

After a year with the Gent youth side, Detruyer moved to Oud-Heverlee Leuven, and during her first season with the club, was voted twice player of the month (October 2019 and November 2021).

During this 2021–22 season, the Louvanistes finished in second place, behind RSC Anderlecht despite a 1–0 victory for their team against the reigning champion Anderlecht.

In May 2022, she was nominated for the “Pro Footballer” of the year trophy alongside Tessa Wullaert from RSC Anderlecht and Marie Minnaert from Club YLA, the first set of two consecutive seasons she would be nominated without success.

=== Inter Milan ===
On 21 June 2024, Detruyer signed a three-year contract with Serie A club Inter Milan until 30 June 2027.

On 13 August 2026, she extended her contract until 30 June 2029.

== International career ==
Detruyer made her debut for the Belgium national team on 12 June 2021, in the match against Luxembourg.

Missing the Belgium squad for UEFA Women's Euro 2022 in England, where the Red Flames were beaten in the quarter-finals 1–0 by Sweden, she went on to contribute to Belgium's successful qualification for UEFA Women's Euro 2025 via the play-offs, starting both legs of the play-off final against Ukraine.

On 11 June 2025, Detruyer was called up to the Belgium squad for the UEFA Women's Euro 2025.

== International goals ==
No.	Date	Venue	Opponent	Score	Result	Competition
1.	16 February 2023	Stadium MK, Milton Keynes, England	Italy	1–0	2–1	2023 Arnold Clark Cup
2.	22 September 2023	Den Dreef, Leuven, Belgium	Netherlands	1–1	2–1	2023–24 UEFA Women's Nations League
3.	1 December 2023	Den Dreef, Leuven, Belgium	Scotland	1–0	1–1	2023–24 UEFA Women's Nations League
4.	24 October 2024	Aviva Stadium, Dublin, Ireland	Republic of Ireland	2–4	2–4	2025 UEFA Women's Nations League play-off matches
5.	9 June 2026	Stade de la Frontière, Esch-sur-Alzette, Luxembourg	Luxembourg	3–0	7–0	2027 FIFA Women's World Cup qualification

== Honours ==
Individual

- Pro League Awards Women's Player of the Season: 2023–24
