= Staf Van Eyken =

Belgian serial killer (born 1951)

- Born: 21 April 1951 (age 75); Bonheiden, Belgium
- Other name: "The Vampire of Muizen"
- Conviction: Murder (3 counts)
- Penalty: Death; commuted to life imprisonment

Details
- Victims: 3
- Span of crimes: 1971–1972
- Country: Belgium

Staf Van Eyken (Dutch pronunciation: [ˈstɑfɑn ˈɛikə(n)]; born 21 April 1951) is a Belgian serial killer who strangled three women between October 1971 and March 1972 in Mechelen and Bonheiden. Because he liked to bite his victims, he got the nickname The Vampire of Muizen. In 1974, he was sentenced to death by an Antwerp cour d'assises, which was automatically converted to life imprisonment.

== Biography ==
=== Youth ===
Van Eyken grew up in a poor family in Bonheiden. His father was an alcoholic who one day abandoned his wife, Marie, and two children, Staf and Jenny. He joined the Foreign Legion, because he had a murder on his conscience, later committing suicide in Algeria. Staf's mother remarried and had another daughter, but her new husband was also an aggressive man with a drinking problem. She later received multiple sclerosis and ended up in a wheelchair. Because she could no longer care for her daughter, the child was placed with the neighbours, an elderly couple. But they all tragically died from inhaling fumes from their stove.

Staf Van Eyken grew up as an unruly child who was often mistreated by his stepfather. In his own words, he was sexually abused by his aunt for four years. In August 1965, when Van Eyken was 14 years old, he molested an 11-year-old girl and was sent to a rehabilitation centre in Mol. He moved from one institution to another, performed his military service at 18, and then worked as a railroad worker in Muizen's marshalling yard.

=== "The Vampire of Muizen" ===
On 13 October 1971, Van Eyken murdered his first victim: 18-year-old Marie-Thérèse Rosseel, maid of a local textile baron. He raped and then strangled her, also biting her in several intimate places and stripping her naked, an act which later earned him the nickname "The Vampire of Muizen".

The second woman who was raped and murdered by him was 47-year-old Ida Smeets, wife of lawyer and university professor Frans van Isacker. He had dragged her to an abandoned factory site and tried to rape her. This failed, so he strangled her, returned home to eat, and then went back to his victim to sexually abuse her. When it turned out that the woman was still alive, he strangled her again, this time killing her. This gruesome murder took place on the same day that his mother died.

On 19 March 1972, Van Eyken murdered his third and final victim Lutgarde Van der Wilt, a 19-year-old student with whom he had danced in a youth club. She too was raped, strangled and, like the previous victims, bitten on the breasts. When her body was found, Van Eyken was cycling along the location and behaved rather strangely. The investigators found this suspicious and stopped him on his way to his house. There they saw that he had a blood stain on his sleeve, and was immediately arrested. Van Eyken admitted to the murders and explicitly insisted that he be locked up. Fearing the dark side of himself, he would never ask for a conditional release later on.

After Van Eyken's arrest, it was found that he had tried to assault and strangle a young woman, but she had survived without him realising. During the investigation, it turned out that he had sexually abused a lot of other women and had tried to kill them. However, these sexual offences did not end up on his criminal record, because at the time they wanted to give minors a second chance.

== Present ==
Van Eyken is currently serving his sentence in the prison of Leuven-Centraal. With more than 45 years behind bars (pre-custody included), he is the longest-serving living detainee in Belgium. The current number two is Freddy Horion, who has been imprisoned for sixfold murder since 1979.

At the beginning of 2016, Van Eyken unintentionally provoked a great deal of commotion when Federal Public Service Justice Koen Geens, despite advice from prison management, gave him permission to leave the prison for one day to visit his sick friend, Jef Lannoo. This decision was controversial because, as a result of the tightening of the law in penitentiary leave days introduced by former Federal Public Service Justice Laurette Onkelinx in 2006, it did not allow parole. Van Eyken's lawyer Walter Damen, however, pointed out that in 2006 Van Eyken had already received more than 80 penitentiary leave days that always ran smoothly. Moreover, according to Damen, the new law still allows for the justice to grant an occasional nightlife permit.

== Popular culture ==
- In 2006 VRT journalist Louis Van Dievel, who grew up in the same neighbourhood as Eyken, published "De Pruimelaarstraat" (Uitgeverij Houtekiet), a fiction novel inspired by the life story of Van Eyken.
- In 2009, the eponymous literary adaptation of the book in the Mechelen theatre 't Arsenaal, directed by Michael De Cock, with Vic De Wachter, Gilda De Bal and Jaak Van Assche in the lead roles.

== See also ==
- List of serial killers by country
