= Virág Nagy =

Hungarian footballer (born 2001)

Personal information
- Date of birth: 4 July 2001 (age 25)
- Place of birth: Hungary
- Height: 1.70 m (5 ft 7 in)
- Position: Defender

Team information
- Current team: OH Leuven
- Number: 4

Senior career*
Years	Team	Apps	(Gls)
- Ferencvaros
2022–2024	Sassuolo	16	(1)
2024	Sampdoria	5	(0)
2024–2025	Meppen	25	(6)
2025–	OH Leuven	4	(0)

International career^{‡}
2016–2018	Hungary U-17	13	(0)
2019–2020	Hungary U-19	7	(0)
2020–	Hungary	15	(0)
- * Club domestic league appearances and goals as of 7 October 2025 ‡ National team caps and goals as of 22 February 2023

Virág Nagy (born 4 July 2001) is a Hungarian professional footballer who plays as a defender for OH Leuven and the Hungary women's national team.

== Career ==
Nagy is a member of the Hungary senior national team having been a regular at under 19 level. She made her debut for the team on 17 September 2020 against Sweden, coming on as a substitute for Zsanett Jakabfi.
