= 2024–25 Belgian Women's Super League =

Eighth season of the top Belgian women's association football league

Belgian Women's Super League
- Season: 2024–25
- Dates: 30 August 2024 – 17 May 2025
- Champions: OH Leuven
- Champions League: Oud-Heverlee Leuven
- Europa Cup: RSC Anderlecht
- Matches: 108
- Goals: 330 (3.06 per match)
- Biggest home win: RSC Anderlecht 7–0 Zulte-Waregem; 13 November 2024
- Biggest away win: Westerlo 0–7 Club YLA; 14 December 2024
- Highest scoring: RSC Anderlecht 7–0 Zulte-Waregem; 13 November 2024; Club YLA 4–3 Standard Liège; 16 November 2024; Westerlo 0–7 Club YLA; 14 December 2024; Leuven 3–4 RSC Anderlecht; 18 January 2025
- All statistics correct as of 18 May 2025.

The 2024–25 Belgian Women's Super League season was the 10th edition since its establishment in 2015. It was the 54th edition of the highest level of women's football in Belgium.

OH Leuven became champion on the last day of the competition by defeating RSC Anderlecht at home with 2–0.

== Format Change ==
Despite previous expectations to increase the number of teams to twelve, the league has been reduced from ten to eight participants. The number of regular season games was increased from eighteen to twenty one by adding a third round of games, with the playoffs retained.

== Team changes ==
=== In ===
- Westerlo were promoted after winning the women's first national division.

=== Out ===
- KV Mechelen, Charleroi and White Star Woluve were relegated due to the format change.

== Teams ==
Locations of the 2024-25 Belgian Super League teams

=== Stadia and locations ===
| Club | Home city | Home ground | Capacity |
|---|---|---|---|
| RSC Anderlecht | Anderlecht | Belgian Football Center, Tubize | 1,000 |
| Genk | Genk | SportinGenk Park, Genk | 2,000 |
| AA Gent Ladies | Ghent | PGB-Stadion, Ghent | 6,500 |
| Club YLA | Bruges | Municipal Sports Center, Aalter | 1,500 |
| Oud-Heverlee Leuven | Leuven | OHL Banqup Campus, Oud-Heverlee | 3,330 |
| Standard Liège | Liège | Stade Maurice Dufrasne, Liège | 27,670 |
| Zulte-Waregem | Zulte | Municipal Sports Stadium, Zulte | 2,500 |
| Westerlo | Westerlo | Het Kuipje | 8,000 |

== Regular competition ==
| Pos | Team | Pld | W | D | L | GF | GA | GD | Pts | Qualification |
|---|---|---|---|---|---|---|---|---|---|---|
| 1 | Oud-Heverlee Leuven | 21 | 16 | 2 | 3 | 47 | 15 | +32 | 50 | Qualification for Champions play-offs |
| 2 | RSC Anderlecht | 21 | 15 | 5 | 1 | 67 | 16 | +51 | 50 | Qualification for Champions play-offs |
| 3 | Standard Liège | 21 | 10 | 6 | 5 | 35 | 21 | +14 | 36 | Qualification for Champions play-offs |
| 4 | Club YLA | 21 | 10 | 3 | 8 | 42 | 27 | +15 | 33 | Qualification for Champions play-offs |
| 5 | Westerlo | 21 | 8 | 1 | 12 | 23 | 46 | −23 | 25 | Qualification for Play-offs 2 |
| 6 | Ladies Genk | 21 | 7 | 4 | 10 | 30 | 42 | −12 | 25 | Qualification for Play-offs 2 |
| 7 | AA Gent Ladies | 21 | 4 | 1 | 16 | 12 | 43 | −31 | 13 | Qualification for Play-offs 2 |
| 8 | Zulte-Waregem | 21 | 3 | 0 | 18 | 9 | 55 | −46 | 9 | Qualification for Play-offs 2 |

Source: proleague.be
Rules for classification: 1) points; 2) goal difference; 3) goals scored

=== Results ===
==== Round 1–14 ====
| Home \ Away | OHL | AND | STL | YLA | WES | GNK | GNT | ZWA |
|---|---|---|---|---|---|---|---|---|
| OHL | — | 3–4 | 2–1 | 2–0 | 1–0 | 3–0 | 5–0 | 2–1 |
| AND | 4–0 | — | 1–1 | 2–0 | 4–0 | 5–1 | 2–1 | 7–0 |
| STL | 1–2 | 2–2 | — | 3–1 | 1–0 | 2–0 | 4–0 | 2–1 |
| YLA | 0–1 | 2–1 | 4–3 | — | 1–3 | 2–2 | 1–0 | 4–0 |
| WES | 0–2 | 0–5 | 1–0 | 0–7 | — | 1–3 | 2–0 | 1–0 |
| GNK | 1–4 | 1–1 | 2–2 | 2–1 | 1–2 | — | 3–1 | 1–0 |
| GNT | 0–0 | 0–3 | 0–1 | 0–4 | 0–4 | 2–1 | — | 0–3 |
| ZWA | 0–4 | 0–5 | 0–1 | 0–4 | 0–2 | 1–2 | 1–3 | — |

Source: proleague.com
Legend: Blue = home team win; Yellow = draw; Red = away team win.

==== Round 15–21 ====
| Home \ Away | OHL | AND | STL | YLA | WES | GNK | GNT | ZWA |
|---|---|---|---|---|---|---|---|---|
| OHL | — | | 0–0 | | | 3–0 | 1–0 | 6–0 |
| AND | 2–0 | — | | | 7–1 | 4–1 | | 3–0 |
| STL | | 1–1 | — | 1–2 | 5–1 | | | 2–0 |
| YLA | 1–3 | 1–1 | | — | | 4–0 | | 0–1 |
| WES | 0–3 | | | 2–2 | — | | 0–1 | |
| GNK | | | 1–1 | | 2–3 | — | 3–0 | |
| GNT | | 1–3 | 0–1 | 0–1 | | | — | |
| ZWA | | | | | 1–0 | 0–3 | 0–3 | — |

Source: proleague.com
Legend: Blue = home team win; Yellow = draw; Red = away team win.

== Play-offs 1 ==
| Pos | Team | Pld | W | D | L | GF | GA | GD | Pts | Qualification | OHL | AND | STL | YLA |
|---|---|---|---|---|---|---|---|---|---|---|---|---|---|---|
| 1 | Oud-Heverlee Leuven (C) | 6 | 4 | 0 | 2 | 8 | 5 | +3 | 37 | Qualification for UEFA Women's Champions League | — | 2–0 | 0–3 | 3–0 |
| 2 | RSC Anderlecht | 6 | 4 | 0 | 2 | 11 | 7 | +4 | 37 | Qualification for UEFA Women's Europa Cup | 1–2 | — | 2–0 | 3–1 |
| 3 | Standard Liège | 6 | 2 | 1 | 3 | 9 | 10 | −1 | 25 | | 1–0 | 2–4 | — | 1–2 |
| 4 | Club YLA | 6 | 1 | 1 | 4 | 5 | 11 | −6 | 21 | | 0–1 | 0–1 | 2–2 | — |

Source: proleague.com
Legend: Blue = home team win; Yellow = draw; Red = away team win.
Rules for classification: 1) points; 2) regular season position
(C) Champions

== Play-offs 2 ==
| Pos | Team | Pld | W | D | L | GF | GA | GD | Pts | GNK | WES | ZWA | GNT |
|---|---|---|---|---|---|---|---|---|---|---|---|---|---|
| 1 | Ladies Genk | 6 | 4 | 2 | 0 | 12 | 7 | +5 | 27 | — | 1–0 | 3–2 | 3–1 |
| 2 | Westerlo | 6 | 0 | 4 | 2 | 6 | 10 | −4 | 17 | 2–2 | — | 2–2 | 0–0 |
| 3 | Zulte Waregem | 6 | 3 | 1 | 2 | 10 | 7 | +3 | 15 | 1–2 | 3–0 | — | 1–0 |
| 4 | AA Gent Ladies | 6 | 0 | 3 | 3 | 4 | 8 | −4 | 10 | 1–1 | 2–2 | 0–1 | — |

Source: proleague.com
Legend: Blue = home team win; Yellow = draw; Red = away team win.
Rules for classification: 1) points; 2) goal difference; 3) goals scored
