= Bonheiden =

- Municipality
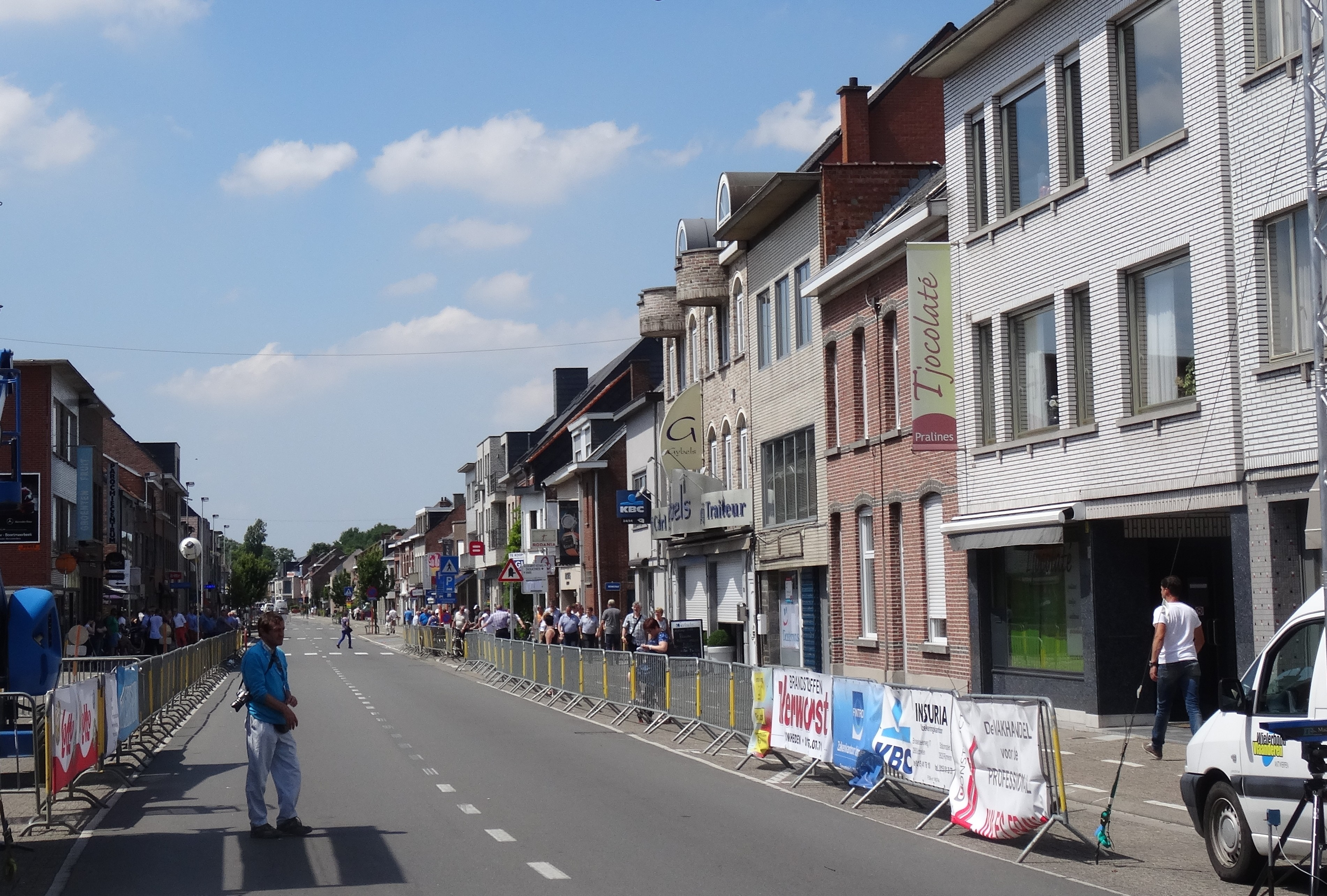

- Flag Coat of arms

- Location of Bonheiden in the province of Antwerp
- Interactive map of Bonheiden
- Location in Belgium
- Coordinates: 51°02′N 04°32′E
- Country: Belgium
- Community: Flemish Community
- Region: Flemish Region
- Province: Antwerp
- Arrondissement: Mechelen

Government
  - Mayor: Lode Van Looy (BR)
  - Governing parties: BR, CD&V, Open VLD

Area
  - Total: 29.19 km^{2} (11.27 sq mi)

Population (2020-01-01)
  - Total: 15,078
  - Density: 516.5/km^{2} (1,338/sq mi)
- Postal codes: 2820
- NIS code: 12005
- Area codes: 015
- Website: www.bonheiden.be

Bonheiden (Dutch pronunciation: [bɔnˈɦɛidə(n)]) is a municipality located in the Belgian province of Antwerp. The municipality comprises the towns of Bonheiden proper and Rijmenam. In 2021, Bonheiden had a total population of 15,177. The total area is 29.27 km^{2} (11.30 sq mi).

== Climate ==
Climate data for Bonheiden (1991−2020 normals)
Month	Jan	Feb	Mar	Apr	May	Jun	Jul	Aug	Sep	Oct	Nov	Dec	Year
Mean daily maximum °C (°F)	6.8 (44.2)	7.7 (45.9)	11.3 (52.3)	15.6 (60.1)	19.1 (66.4)	21.9 (71.4)	24.0 (75.2)	23.8 (74.8)	20.2 (68.4)	15.5 (59.9)	10.5 (50.9)	7.1 (44.8)	15.3 (59.5)
Daily mean °C (°F)	4.0 (39.2)	4.4 (39.9)	7.2 (45.0)	10.4 (50.7)	14.1 (57.4)	17.0 (62.6)	19.1 (66.4)	18.7 (65.7)	15.4 (59.7)	11.5 (52.7)	7.4 (45.3)	4.5 (40.1)	11.2 (52.2)
Mean daily minimum °C (°F)	1.3 (34.3)	1.2 (34.2)	3.0 (37.4)	5.2 (41.4)	9.0 (48.2)	12.1 (53.8)	14.2 (57.6)	13.6 (56.5)	10.6 (51.1)	7.5 (45.5)	4.4 (39.9)	2.0 (35.6)	7.0 (44.6)
Average precipitation mm (inches)	68.0 (2.68)	60.3 (2.37)	54.2 (2.13)	41.8 (1.65)	55.7 (2.19)	72.9 (2.87)	75.6 (2.98)	79.9 (3.15)	65.8 (2.59)	64.6 (2.54)	71.9 (2.83)	82.9 (3.26)	793.7 (31.25)
Average precipitation days (≥ 1.0 mm)	12.2	11.3	10.6	8.7	9.8	9.9	10.3	10.2	9.7	10.5	11.9	13.5	128.6
Mean monthly sunshine hours	61	76	132	185	213	215	220	207	162	117	67	51	1,705
Source: Royal Meteorological Institute

== Notable people ==
- John Cordier (1942–2002), founder of Telindus
- Luc Van Den Brande (1945), Flemish politician
- Staf Van Eyken (1951), convicted serial killer
- Wouter Van Besien (1972), Flemish politician
- Kurt Mollekens (1973), racing driver
- Sven Nys (1976), cyclo-cross rider
- Inge Vervotte (December 1977), Belgian politician
- Dave McCullen (1977), Belgian deejay
- Niels Albert (1986), cyclo-cross rider
- Sofie Van Houtven (1987), footballer
- Koen Casteels (1992), footballer
- Thibau Nys (2002), cyclo-cross rider
- Lisa Vaelen (2004), Belgian gymnast
