= Édouard de Laveleye =

Belgian engineer, financier, and writer (1854–1938)

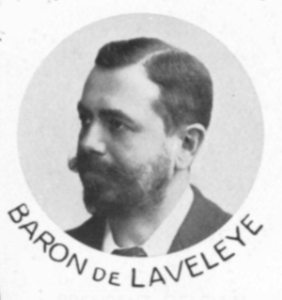
- Édouard De Laveleye

1st President of the Belgian Football Association
- In office 1895–1924
- Succeeded by: Joseph d'Oultremont

1st President of Belgian Olympic Committee
- In office 1906–1923
- Succeeded by: Henri de Baillet-Latour
- Born: Baron Édouard Emile Albert de Laveleye; 22 October 1854; Ghent, Belgium
- Died: 23 November 1938 (aged 84); City of Brussels, Belgium
- Citizenship: Spanish
- Occupations: Football executive; Banker
- Known for: 1st President of the Belgian Football Association
- Relatives: Marguerite de Laveleye (sister)

Baron Édouard-Émile-Albert de Laveleye (Ghent, 22 October 1854 – Brussels, 23 November 1938) was a Belgian mining engineer, financier and writer. Laveleye was the first chairman of the Belgian Football Association (1895–1924), and also the first president of the Belgian Olympic Committee (1906–23).

He made several investment trips in Latin America. (Note: C'est en effet qu'il envisage, en tant que conseiller du banquier Fontaine de Laveleye pour ses investissements en Amérique latine, la formation de la City à laquelle s'associeront d'autres banquiers européens, comme Lord Balfour de...) His nephew was Victor de Laveleye, the Belgian government in exile's spokesman in London during World War II. (Note: Victor Laveleye .. Il fut membre du Comité olympique belge et président de l'association belge du hockey. Petit-neveu d'Emile, neveu du baron Edouard de Laveleye. Il participa, pour la Belgique, à l'élaboration de la charte des Nations Unies à San Francisco.)

== Early life ==
Édouard de Laveleye was born on 22 October 1854 as the son of Émile de Laveleye (1822–1892), a famed economist. (Note: Baron (1892) Édouard-Émile-Albert de Laveleye, né Gand 22 oct. 1854, ép. Clepper-Noorwood (comté de Surrey, Angleterre), 28 août 1879.) (Note: Notes de Voyage, par M. EDOUARD DE LAVELEYE. – M. Ed. De Laveleye, le fils du célèbre économiste et littérateur, Emile De Laveleye, a publié dans la Bibliothèque Gilon un ouvrage dont nous n'osons pas trop le féliciter. Ce ne sont que des notes, nous dira-t-on, mais il n'en reste pas moin...) Laveleye married Florence Ethel Wheeler on 9 December 1879, in Liège.

In his mid-20s, Laveleye made several investment trips in Latin America and wrote everything about his travels in his journal. In 1881, two of Laveleye's travel journals, titled Les nouveautés de New-York et le Niagara d’hiver (what's new from New York and winter Niagara) and Excursion aux nouvelles découvertes minières du Colorado (Excursion to Colorado's New Mining Discoveries), were published on 1 July 1881, together with several other journals from three authors, in Volume 42 of Le Tour du Monde, Nouveau Journal des Voyages, a weekly magazine that brings together more than 900 travel stories, French or foreign, written by more than 500 travelers including around thirty women.

In August 1883, the 29-year-old Laveleye, then the Honorary Secretary of the Association of Engineers from the University of Liège, organized the reception for the Institution of Mechanical Engineers, whose summer meeting was being held in Belgium for the first time. The newspapers of the time described him as "the most cordial character".

== Sports ==
In the 1895–96 season, the 41-year-old Laveleye played a few matches for Léopold FC. When the Union Belge des Sociétés de Sports Athlétiques (UBSSA) was established in 1895, Laveleye was elected as the first chairman of the football section, a position he held for nearly 30 years, until 1924. In 1898, when Paul Hanssens resigned as President of the UBSSA, Laveleye succeeded him while also continuing as president of the football section. Back then, the coach as we know him today did not yet exist, so most of the European national teams were selected by the chairman of its National Football Association rather than by a national manager. As such, Laveleye selected the line-ups of Belgium's matches between 1904 and 1909, and then again in 1913 and 1919. He is thus credited by some as Belgium's first-ever manager.

On 22 May 1904, twenty days after Belgium's first-ever match (whose squad was elected by Laveleye), France and five other European football associations founded the Fédération Internationale de Football Association (FIFA), but the football associations of the British Home Nations unanimously rejected such a body. However, in early 1905, Laveleye, with great personal efforts, dissipated the last misgivings of the English and was able to convince the representatives of The Football Association to join FIFA rather than remain independent. On 14 April 1905, The Football Association recognized the authority of FIFA. This allowed FIFA to hold its first international football competition. In allying the Football Association in the French FIFA, each of the home nations joined as equal members, a legacy maintained today. For his services, he was made the first honorary member of FIFA.

On 18 February 1906, in the Hotel Ravenstein in Brussels, Laveleye formed the Belgian Olympic Committee, and was elected the group's first president. In this role he posted a bid for Belgium on 27 March 1912 to host the 1920 Olympics. The games were successfully awarded to Antwerp, much because of his influence and the effect World War I had on the nation. This still is the only time they have been held in Belgium.

At the 1913 IOC Session in Lausanne, Laveleye was co-opted onto the International Olympic Committee (IOC) in May 1913, but his seat "should not be considered permanent". However, when Belgium hosted the 1920 Antwerpen Olympics, the nation became entitled to two IOC members (hence why later IOC records list Laveleye's co-option as occurring in 1919), so Laveleye remained a member until his death in November 1938, at the age of 84.

== Writings ==
- Chicago et la traversée du continent - Notes d'un voyage aux États-Unis 1880
- Les nouveautés de New-York et le Niagara d’hiver 1881
- Excursion aux nouvelles découvertes minières du Colorado 1881
