= Marguerite de Laveleye =

Marguerite de Laveleye (1859–1942) was a Belgian temperance lecturer who served as President of the Belgium Woman's Christian Temperance Union (WCTU).

== Biography ==
Marguerite Louise Adelaide de Laveleye was born in Gheluvelt, near Ypres, Belgium, on 21 June 1859. Her father was the political economist, Émile de Laveleye. There were two siblings, a brother, Baron Édouard de Laveleye, and a sister, Marie-Rose-Julie.

She was educated at home, in England, and in Germany.

She was devoted to the temperance cause since 1886, when she became associated with the Society of the Blue Cross in Belgium. In 1906, she was made president of the Belgium WCTU.

Early in the 20th century, at Pontareuse, Switzerland, Laveleve studied the potential establishment of an institution for the treatment of alcoholics. She inaugurated a similar one on her own farm, near Spa, Belgium. The project proved successful, and in 1907, a committee to carry on the work was formed at Liege.

Later, she made a tour of the world, lecturing on temperance in India, Burma, Japan, Canada, United States, England, France, Germany, Italy, and Belgium. She attended several of the international congresses against alcoholism as a delegate of various Belgian societies — the Sixth Congress, held at Brussels in 1897; the Seventh, held at Paris in 1899; the Ninth, held at Bremen in 1903; the Thirteenth, held at The Hague in 1911; and the Fourteenth, held at Milan in 1913.

Marguerite de Laveleye died in 1942.
