= 2025–26 Belgian Women's Super League =

Eighth season of the top Belgian women's association football league

Belgian Women's Super League
- Season: 2025–26
- Dates: 6 September 2025 – 22 May 2026
- Champions: Oud-Heverlee Leuven (2nd title)
- Champions League: Oud-Heverlee Leuven
- Europa Cup: RSC Anderlecht
- Matches: 43
- Goals: 125 (2.91 per match)
- Biggest home win: RSC Anderlecht 6–0 Genk; 20 September 2025
- Biggest away win: Gent 1–5 OH Leuven; 21 September 2025; Gent 1–5 OH Leuven; 15 November 2025
- Highest scoring: RSC Anderlecht 6–0 Genk; 20 September 2025; Gent 1–5 OH Leuven; 21 September 2025; Gent 1–5 OH Leuven; 15 November 2025; Club YLA 4–2 Standard Liège; 13 December 2025
- All statistics correct as of 14 December 2025.

The 2025–26 Belgian Women's Super League season is the 11th edition since its establishment in 2015. It is the 55th edition of the highest level of women's football in Belgium.

== Format change ==
No changes were made to the format or the teams, meaning the same eight teams played a regular season in which each team played every other team three times, after which the top four and bottom four played separate playoffs, starting with half the points from the regular season.

== Teams ==
Locations of the 2025-26 Belgian Super League teams

=== Stadia and locations ===
Club	Home city	Home ground	Capacity
RSC Anderlecht	Anderlecht	Belgian Football Center, Tubize	1,000
Genk	Genk	SportinGenk Park, Genk	2,000
AA Gent Ladies	Ghent	PGB-Stadion, Ghent	6,500
Club YLA	Bruges	Municipal Sports Center, Aalter	1,500
Oud-Heverlee Leuven	Leuven	OHL Banqup Campus, Oud-Heverlee (Note: Some matches played at Den Dreef.)	3,330
Standard Liège	Liège	Stade Maurice Dufrasne, Liège	27,670
Zulte-Waregem	Zulte	Municipal Sports Stadium, Zulte	2,500
Westerlo	Westerlo	Het Kuipje	8,000

== Regular competition ==
Pos	Team	Pld	W	D	L	GF	GA	GD	Pts	Qualification
1	Oud-Heverlee Leuven	21	19	1	1	52	14	+38	58	Qualification for Champions play-offs
2	Anderlecht	21	14	3	4	41	23	+18	45	Qualification for Champions play-offs
3	Club YLA	21	10	4	7	41	30	+11	34	Qualification for Champions play-offs
4	Standard Liège	21	7	5	9	24	29	−5	26	Qualification for Champions play-offs
5	Zulte Waregem	21	6	8	7	31	29	+2	26	Qualification for Play-offs 2
6	Ladies Genk	21	5	5	11	31	45	−14	20	Qualification for Play-offs 2
7	Gent Ladies	21	4	4	13	20	44	−24	16	Qualification for Play-offs 2
8	Westerlo	21	2	4	15	20	46	−26	10	Qualification for Play-offs 2

Source: proleague.be
Rules for classification: 1) points; 2) goal difference; 3) goals scored

=== Results ===
Home \ Away	OHL	AND	YLA	STA	ZWA	GNK	GNT	WES	OHL	AND	YLA	STA	ZWA	GNK	GNT	WES
Oud-Heverlee Leuven	—	3–0 (Note: Due to the participation of both OH Leuven and Anderlecht in the European competitions, several matches were rescheduled. OH Leuven-Anderlecht (matchday 7) moved from mid-October to February, the matches between Gent and OH Leuven (matchdays 9 and 16) were switched, Gent now hosting mid-November, OH Leuven hosting the return end of January.)	2–1	2–1	2–1	1–1	2–0	2–0 (Note: Due to snow and frozen pitches, the matches Standard-Genk, Anderlecht-Zulte Waregem, and OH Leuven-Westerlo of 10 January 2026 (matchday 13) were postponed.)	—	—	2–1	—	2–0	4–1	—	2–1
Anderlecht	1–3	—	2–1	2–0	1–1	6–0	2–0	2–0	0–1	—	—	3–0	—	2–1	—	1–0
Club YLA	2–0	1–3	—	4–2	0–0	2–2	1–2	2–0	—	2–3	—	0–3	2–1	—	3–0	—
Standard Liège	1–3	1–1 (Note: With both OH Leuven and Anderlecht taking part in the qualifying rounds of the European competitions, the matches Westerlo-OH Leuven and Standard Liège-Anderlecht of matchday two were postponed to 18 October. To allow their opponents to keep match rhythm, the matchday 7 match Standard Liège-Westerlo of 18 October was moved forward to 13 September.)	0–0	—	2–2	0–2	2–1	4–1	1–2	—	—	—	1–0	—	2–0	1–1
Zulte Waregem	0–5	1–1	1–3	0–0	—	1–0	0–0	4–1	—	3–4	—	—	—	3–3	1–1	—
Ladies Genk	0–3	1–3	0–4	2–0	0–3	—	0–2	2–3	—	—	1–2	2–0	—	—	—	4–2
Gent Ladies	1–5	1–2	1–4	1–2	0–2	1–6	—	0–0	1–5 (Note: Due to the participation of both OH Leuven and Anderlecht in the European competitions, several matches were rescheduled. OH Leuven-Anderlecht (matchday 7) moved from mid-October to February, the matches between Gent and OH Leuven (matchdays 9 and 16) were switched, Gent now hosting mid-November, OH Leuven hosting the return end of January.)	2–0	—	—	—	2–2	—	—
Westerlo	0–1	1–2	2–3	0–1	0–2	1–1	2–1	—	—	—	3–3	—	1–5	—	1–3	—

Source: proleague.com
Legend: Blue = home team win; Yellow = draw; Red = away team win.

== Play-offs ==
=== Championship Play-offs ===
The top four teams after the regular season take part in the Championship Play-offs, with their points halved (rounded up). As the points of Anderlecht were rounded up, they will always be ranked below other teams in case of ties after conclusion of the play-offs.

Pos	Team	Pld	W	D	L	GF	GA	GD	Pts	Qualification	OHL	AND	YLA	STA
1	Oud-Heverlee Leuven (C)	6	3	3	0	10	6	+4	41	Qualification for UEFA Women's Champions League	—	1–1	2–1	3–2
2	Anderlecht	6	2	4	0	8	4	+4	33	Qualification for UEFA Women's Europa Cup	1–1	—	1–1	2–0
3	Club YLA	6	1	2	3	6	10	−4	22		0–2	0–2	—	2–1
4	Standard Liège	6	0	3	3	7	11	−4	16		1–1	1–1	2–2	—

Source: proleague.com
Legend: Blue = home team win; Yellow = draw; Red = away team win.
Rules for classification: 1) Points; 2) Points without (possible) half points added due to rounding; 3) Regular season finishing position
(C) Champions

=== Play-offs 2 ===
The bottom four teams after the regular season take part in the Play-offs 2, with their points halved (rounded up).

Pos	Team	Pld	W	D	L	GF	GA	GD	Pts	ZWA	GNK	GNT	WES
1	Zulte Waregem	6	4	1	1	12	6	+6	26	—	0–0	4–1	4–2
2	Ladies Genk	6	3	2	1	10	4	+6	21	1–2	—	2–2	2–0
3	Gent Ladies	6	1	1	4	5	11	−6	12	0–1	0–2	—	1–0
4	Westerlo	6	2	0	4	6	12	−6	11	2–1	0–3	2–1	—

Source: proleague.com
Legend: Blue = home team win; Yellow = draw; Red = away team win.
Rules for classification: 1) points; 2) goal difference; 3) goals scored
