= Belgian Women's Third Division =

Women's sports competition in Belgium

- Founded: 1990
- Folded: 2016
- Country: Belgium
- Confederation: KBVB
- Number of clubs: A:14; B:12
- Promotion to: Second Division
- Relegation to: Belgian Women's Provincial Divisions
- Domestic cup: Belgian Women's Cup

The Belgian Women's Third Division (Dutch: Derde Klasse; French: Troisième Division; German: Dritte Division) was the fourth top level women's football league of Belgium until 2016. It started in 1990 for only one season. In season 2001-02 they reinstated the division again. The competition is divided in 2 series so there are 2 winner who will promote to Belgian Women's Second Division.

However, the Belgian Football Association decided in 2016 to abolish the Third division and to expand the Second division from 12 to 28 teams. Since then, there have been two, and from 2023 even three series in the Second division, which has been rename Interprovincial Division.

== Format ==
In the league's season, 14 teams participated in Series A and 12 teams in Series B, playing a double round-robin schedule to decide the champion.

== Champions ==
=== Chronology ===
==== Series A ====
- 1990 RC Harelbeke
- 2002 DV. Famkes Merkem
- 2003 K.SV. Jabbeke
- 2004 FC. EXC. Kaart
- 2005 K.SV.Jabbeke
- 2006 K.Achterbroek V.V.
- 2007 KV.Cercle Melle
- 2008 Damesvoetbal Davo Waregem
- 2009 Miecroob Veltem
- 2010 Oud-Heverlee Leuven B
- 2011 K.Massenhoven VC.
- 2012 Eendracht Aalst
- 2013 Club Brugge B
- 2014 AA Gent B
- 2015 KVK Svelta Melsele
- 2016 KV Mechelen Ladies

==== Series B ====
- 1990 F.C.Turnhout
- 2002 K.Vlimmeren Sport
- 2003 K. Patro Maasmechelen
- 2004 FC. Fémina W.S. Woluwe
- 2005 FC. Fémina Braine-Rebecq
- 2006 R.CS.Ways-Genappe
- 2007 V.V.D.G. Lommel
- 2008 R.FC.Rhisnois
- 2009 Standard Luik B
- 2010 Dames Voetbal Opglabbeek
- 2011 Wallonia Club Sibret
- 2012 Zonhven DV
- 2013 Tongeren DV
- 2014 Wolfsdonk Sport
- 2015 Wallonia Club Sibret
- 2016 KOVC Sterrebeek
