= K Kontich FC (women) =

Belgian women's football club

K. Kontich FC
- Full name: Koninklijke Kontich Football Club
- Short name: Kontich Dames
- Founded: 1967 (Blue Bell Girls); 1971 (vrouwenploeg Kontich FC); 2010 (GBA-Kontich FC); 2011 (Beerschot AD); 2012 ‘’(K. Beerschot AC)’’ 2013 ‘’(R. Antwerp FC); 2014 ‘’(Kontich FC)’’
- Ground: Kontich
- Chairman: (Belgium) Wim Claes
- Coach: (Belgium) Guy Corten
- League: Interprovincial B (level 3)
- 2023-2024: 7th
- Website: www.kkontichfc.be/dames/interprovinciale-b/
Home colours	Away colours

Kontich FC is a Belgian women's football club from Kontich. The club colours are red and yellow. Starting in 2010 the club was a joined venture of Kontich FC and Germinal Beerschot. The next year renamed to Beerschot AD, the following year, in 2013 the club was moved to Antwerp as the new ladies department of R. Antwerp FC. As from 2014 the club was moved back again to Kontich as K. Kontich FC.

After playing in the Belgian Women's First National Division (level 2) between 2016 and 2023, the club voluntarily demoted to Interprovincial B (level 3), despite being champion in their last season. The coach and a large part of the players moved that summer to neighboring club KVC Westerlo Ladies.

== Current squad ==
15 January 2017 Note: Flags indicate national team as defined under FIFA eligibility rules; some limited exceptions apply. Players may hold more than one non-FIFA nationality.

No.	Pos.	Nation	Player
—	GK	BEL	Yana Reichert
—	GK	BEL	Silke Baccarne
—	DF	BEL	Annelies Van Loock
—	DF	BEL	Charlote Andries
—	DF	BEL	Lisa Verbraeken
—	DF	BEL	Margot Degryse
—	DF	BEL	Inge Firlefijn
—	MF	BEL	Jill Michiels
—	MF	BEL	Jolien Lebegge

No.	Pos.	Nation	Player
—	MF	BEL	Sanne Corten
—	MF	BEL	Stefanie Van Broeck
—	MF	BEL	Jolien Belmans
—	FW	BEL	Annelies Van Den Bergh
—	FW	BEL	Chiara Wielockx
—	FW	BEL	Deborah zinga
—	FW	BEL	Joke Verelst
—	FW	BEL	Lucinda Michez
—	FW	NED	Nijah in het Veld

== Current coaches ==
- (Belgium) Guy Corten T1
- (Belgium) Johan van Echelpoel T2/KT

== History ==
In 2013 the women's team played as Royal Antwerp FC. The team folded after the 2013–14 BeNe League season for financial problems. They finished bottom of the table that season.
