= Belgian Women's Second Division =

- Founded: 1982
- Country: Belgium
- Confederation: KBVB
- Number of clubs: 3 x 12
- Level on pyramid: 3
- Promotion to: First Division
- Relegation to: Provincial competitions
- Domestic cup: Belgian Women's Cup

The Belgian Women's Second Division (Dutch: Tweede Klasse; French: Deuxième Division; German: Zweite Division) is the third level women's football league of Belgium. It started in 1981–82.

Since the 2023/24 season, the Second Division is now called Interprovincial and consists of 3 series of 12 teams: 2 Flemish and 1 French-speaking (ACFF).

== Format ==
In the league's season, in each serie, 12 teams participate, playing a double round-robin schedule to decide the champion.

== Winners ==
In the years 1991, 1994, between 1998-2001, and between 2017-2023 there were two leagues in Second Division and therefore two winners those years. From 2023/24, there are 2 Flemish and 1 French-speaking (ACFF) leagues, and therefore 3 winners.

- 1982 V.C. Asse Ter Heide
- 1983 F.C. Féminin Gosselies
- 1984 V.V.D.G. Lommel
- 1985 DVV Brugge
- 1986 S.V. Terheide Asse
- 1987 V.V.D.G. Lommel
- 1988 Elen Standard
- 1989 Kam. Aalst
- 1990 V.V.D.G. Lommel
- 1991 Dames F.C. J. Nijlen (A) / KFC Rapide Wezemaal (B)
- 1992 DVK Egem
- 1993 Sinaai Girls
- 1994 DVK Gent (A) / Union Forest Dames (B)
- 1995 .S.V. Cercle Brugge
- 1996 DVK Haacht
- 1997 Helchteren V.V.
- 1998 DVK Haacht (A) / Standard Fémina de Braine (B)
- 1999 K.F.C. Lentezon Beerse (A)/ Miecroob Veltem (B)
- 2000 SK. Aalst (A) / Ladies Willebroek (B)
- 2001 K.S.C. Eendracht Aalst (A) / SK Opex Girls Oostende (B)
- 2002 DVC Land Van Grimbergen
- 2003 Dames Zultse V.V.
- 2004 K.Vlimmeren Sport
- 2005 FC.Fémina W.S. Woluwe
- 2006 DV Famkes Merkem
- 2007 K.Kontich FC
- 2008 K.SV.Jabbeke
- 2009 Dames Zultse VV. A
- 2010 K.Kontich FC
- 2011 KSK Heist Ladies
- 2012 Melle Ladies
- 2013 Standard Luik B
- 2014 Massenhoven VC
- 2015 Gent Ladies
- 2016 DVK Egem
- 2017 Svelta Melsele (A) / Wuustwezel FC (B)
- 2018 Club Brugge (A) / KRC Genk Ladies B (B)
- 2019 KSK Voorwaarts Zwevezele (A) / Oud-Heverlee Leuven B (B)
- 2020 RSC Anderlecht B (A) / RFC de Liège (B)
- 2021 No Competitions due to Corona
- 2022 Zulte-Waregem B (A) / KVC Westerlo (B)
- 2023 Club Brugge B (A) / FC Alken (B)
- 2024 KSV Bredene (A) / KV Mechelen B (B) / Femina Woluwe B (F)
- 2025 Olsa Brakel (A) / Patro Eisden (B) / RAAL La Louvière (F)
- 2026 KFC Damme (A) / Herk Sport Hasselt (B) / Stade Mouscronnois Girls (FFA)
