= Rodolphe Seeldrayers =

Belgian football administrator and President of FIFA

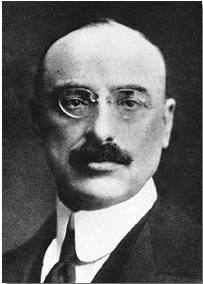
- Seeldrayers by the mid 1950s

4th President of FIFA
- In office 21 June 1954 – 7 October 1955
- Preceded by: Jules Rimet
- Succeeded by: Arthur Drewry

Personal details
- Born: Rodolphe William Seeldrayers; 16 December 1876 Düsseldorf, Rhine Province, Prussia, German Empire
- Died: 7 October 1955 (aged 78) Brussels, Belgium
- Occupation: Sports journalist

Rodolphe William Seeldrayers (16 December 1876 – 7 October 1955) was a Belgian sports administrator and journalist who was the fourth president of FIFA, serving from 1954 to 1955. He was actively involved in the official associations of Belgium sports.

== Early life ==
Born in 1876, in Düsseldorf, Germany, Seeldrayers studied law at the Université libre de Bruxelles (Free University of Brussels), where he began his sporting activities. At 19 he was one of the founders of the Union royale belge des Sociétés de football association (URBSFA), or Royal Belgian Union of Association Football Societies, for which he was the treasurer for four years and a member of the Executive Council for 25 years. He was later elected as an honorary member. In 1914, the Union used his talents as an orator and named him a delegate to FIFA, of which he was made vice-president in 1927.

In 1899, Seeldrayers began a career as a sports journalist with the magazine "La vie sportive" (Sporting Life), writing a column under the pen name Spectator. Ten years later, he founded the National Committee for Physical Education which merged with the Belgian Olympic Committee. He became head of the committee beginning in 1946, succeeding Prince Albert de Ligne.

== The Olympics and FIFA ==
In 1920, he was technical secretary of the Olympic Games at Antwerp, and a member of the appeals jury for football at the Olympics several times. He was most notable in this role at the 1936 Summer Olympics in Berlin, when during the Peru vs. Austria game spectators invaded the pitch which provoked an appeals jury consultation. The Austrian Football Association sent a complaint to the appeals committee which decided, after deliberation, to re-play the match "behind closed doors". Peru disagreed and their entire Olympic squad left the Games complaining of the "crafty Berlin decision". He also received the official Czechoslovak complaint following the abandoned 1920 Olympic Final, which had been refereed by John Lewis.

An inveterate founder of clubs and associations, the following organizations are to Seeldrayers' credit: the Waterloo Golf-Club (1923), the Ixelles Football Club (which would be part of the merger with the Racing Club of Brussels), and the Anglo-Belgian Cricket Sporting Club. Selldrayers seemed to be well received in English circles: up-to-date and to the point in matters of sport, he spoke the English language. At the same time, he continued his journalistic activities and began a new collaboration with the publication Sports Echo (L'Écho des Sports). He ended this aspect of his career in 1935 while still continuing to publish articles and making his opinions known in the columns of the Bulletins of the International Olympic Committee.

World War II slowed but did not stop his activities. As a member of the Belgian Olympic Committee during the Occupation, he stood up for the independence of Belgian sport. At the end of the war, he was one of the members of the International Olympic Committee for the first post-war Games, in 1946.

A great mutual respect existed between Seeldrayers and the then president of FIFA, universally respected Frenchman Jules Rimet. This translated on the part of the Belgian, into a motion introduced on 25 July 1946, at a FIFA congress, to change the name of the World Cup to the "Jules Rimet Cup".

For many years, the question of amateurism posed a problem. With the economic development of sports, the phenomenon of professionalism began to bring into question the fundamentals of the conception of the Olympic Games, as P. de Coubertin wanted them to be. Debates raged and a Commission on Amateurism was created, supported by the International Olympic Committee, which Seeldrayers took part in. In the end, the commission submitted its final report in 1947, at the session in Stockholm. It included a definition of amateurism and required future participants in the Olympic Games to sign a declaration affirming they were true amateurs, and proposed the creation of a permanent commission. This was composed of three members of the International Olympic Committee, and a delegate of each international federation.

At the beginning of 1955, Jules Rimet resigned from FIFA and passed his authority to his vice-president, R. W. Seeldrayers. This handing down of power, as well as the matches of the World Cup of 1954, were shown on television for the first time. Under his presidency, the Federation counted 85 members and celebrated its fiftieth anniversary.

Under his presidency of FIFA, Seeldrayers faced another problem: FIFA was reproached for having given permission for "false" amateurs to participate in a Helsinki tournament, even though a definition of amateurism had been introduced in its by-laws by Seeldrayers himself, vice president of the federation at the time. The problem was complex, with the decision on which games will participate in major sports events at stake. It was also a time when regimes used sports as a means of propaganda.

Aware of the significance of this problem, Seeldrayers remained faithful to his view of the sport. For him, "from a point of view strictly Olympic, sport is only possible, theoretically, when practiced by amateurs." His opinion didn't prevent him from respecting professional players who followed the spirit of the game with loyalty, sincerity, and fair-play. And even though he clearly saw the use of sports in communist propaganda, he understood and approved that phenomenon to a certain extent. In his opinion, sports were a key element of social organization. They must be integrated into the school curriculum on the same level that any other subject and are capital to youths' education. Seeldrayers considered the criticisms flawed, and over time, his opinion didn't improve. He believed that it was the duty of the press to teach the spectator.

R.W. Seeldrayers died a year after his election as president of FIFA, on 7 October 1955, due to illness, and received a semi-official funeral, following a governmental decision. He was posthumously elected a member of the IOC (International Olympic Committee). It was then decided that this title would not be given posthumously again.

== Sportsmanship ==
Seeldrayers played sports and had a preference for team sports. He believed sports must be the playing field of an apprenticeship in the necessary values of life and community.

== Influence ==
Eight fields of Belgian sports benefited from Seeldrayers' attentions: athletics, football, aviation, cricket, field hockey, golf and, in a small measure, tennis and swimming — athletics and football being his main focus. He was the Belgian 110 metre hurdles champion in 1897, and he competed as a hurdler for ten years. He was the Belgium Division of Honour champion with the Racing-Club of Brussels' team in 1900, and captain of the university team of Brussels in 1898 and 1899. All in all, he competed for 26 years.

As for other fields, their practice lasted an average of ten years and always at an elevated level of accomplishment, winning, at least, a championship: he had five years in the Regatta Club (Cercle des régates) of Brussels and the "Sunburn" team (Coup de Soleil), ten years of cricket in le Racing and the "Anglo-Belgian Club" of Brussels, and was three times champion of Belgium. In 1924 he was captain of the national team which defeated France in Paris. For ten years he played hockey for the Racing-Club of Brussels, and in 1903, for the national team against France in Paris. He played golf from 1919 onward in the Waterloo Golf Club where he was captain for ten years.
