= Royal Belgian Football Association =

Governing body of association football in Belgium

UEFA
- Founded: 1 September 1895; 131 years ago
- Headquarters: Tubize
- FIFA affiliation: 1904
- UEFA affiliation: 15 June 1954; 72 years ago
- President: Pascale Van Damme
- Website: www.rbfa.be

The Royal Belgian Football Association (RBFA; Dutch: Koninklijke Belgische Voetbalbond; French: Union royale belge des sociétés de football association; German: Königlicher Belgischer Fußballverband) is the governing body of football in Belgium. It was a founding member of FIFA in 1904 and UEFA in 1954 and is based in Brussels, not far from the King Baudouin Stadium. Since October 2021, the headquarters of the RBFA are located in Tubize, next to its technical centre. Its chairman is Pascale Van Damme.

== Teams and competitions ==
The Association organizes the Belgium men's, women's, youth national teams, and national eSports team for FIFA. It also runs the Belgian football league system, which includes the following competitions:

- Belgian Pro League
- Challenger Pro League
- National Division 1
- Division 2
- Division 3
- Provincial leagues
- Cup
- Supercup
- Futsal competitions
- Women's competitions:
  - Super League
  - First Division
  - Second Division
  - Third Division
  - Cup
  - From the 2012–13 through 2014–15 seasons, the federation partnered with its Dutch counterpart to operate a joint national league, the BeNe League. The two federations dissolved the joint league and reestablished their own top-level women's leagues.

== Chairpersons ==
- 1895–1924: Baron Edouard de Laveleye
- 1924–1929: Count Joseph d'Oultremont
- 1929–1937: Rodolphe William Seeldrayers
- 1937–1943: Oscar van Kesbeeck
- 1945–1951: Francis Dessain
- 1951–1967: Georges Hermesse
- 1967–1987: Louis Wouters
- 1987–2001: Baron Michel D'Hooghe
- 2001–2005: Jan Peeters
- 2006–2017: François De Keersmaecker
- 2017–2019: Gérard Linard
- 2019–2021: Mehdi Bayat
- 2021–2022: Robert Huygens
- 2022–2023: Paul Van den Bulck
- 2023–present: Pascale Van Damme

== Association awards ==
Each year, the executive committee of the Belgian FA honours deserving people with awards.

These include (highest award first):

- Grand Order of the Baron de Laveleye, as of 2015 only given to five people (including former chairmen)
- Gold Medal, for honorary members serving 10 years
- Honorary Member, to certain international referees and chairmen (typically 40 years of service)
- Emeritus Member, to certain referees and chairmen (typically 30 years of service)
- Association Medal of Honour, to certain referees and chairmen (typically 20 years of service)
- Medal of Recognition, mostly given to national football team players with 35 caps, but also to players with 20 caps whose career stopped after injury and people who have performed an exceptional service to the RBFA.

== Received awards ==
- In 1992, the FIFA awarded the Belgian Football Association the FIFA Fair Play Award.

== Charity ==
In the summer of 1986, when the national men's A-selection reached the semifinals of the World Cup in Mexico, the football team started the project Casa Hogar under impulse of RBFA delegation responsible Michel D'Hooghe. This is a home for street children in the industrial Mexican city Toluca, to which the football players donated part of their tournament bonuses. During 25 years, the RBFA stayed committed with this project and helped 500 children to meals and education.

== Current sponsorships ==
- Adidas
- BMW
- Brussels Airlines
- Coca-Cola
- Côte d'Or
- GLS
- ING Group
- Jupiler
- Lotto
- PricewaterhouseCoopers
- Proximus
- Zalando

== Previous sponsorships ==
- Besix
- Carrefour
- ERGO
- Luminus
- RTBF
- Sporza
