= KSK Heist (women) =

Coordinates: 51°04′00.13″N 4°44′02.91″E

- Full name: Koninklijke Sportkring Heist
- Nickname: Ladies Heist
- Founded: 1971 (Astrio Begijnendijk); 2008 (as part as KSK Heist)
- Dissolved: 2022
- Ground: Gemeentelijk Sportcentrum
- Capacity: 3549
- Chairman: (Belgium) Jacques Borremans
- Manager: (Belgium) Jeroen van den Heule
- League: Super League
- 2017/2018: 6th
- Website: https://www.kskheist.be (nl)
Home colours	Away colours

KSK Heist was a Belgian football team from Heist-op-den-Berg, who also had several women's teams in provincial divisions. This ladies team was part of K.S.K. Heist, which is affiliated to the KBVB with number 2948 and had blue and white as their club colours. The women's department was the former FC Astrio Begijnendijk, a topclub in the early years of the official women's football in Belgium in the early-1970s.

== History ==
In 1971 the KBVB founded the first woman's league in Belgium. FC Astrio Begijnendijk was founded in 1972 in Begijpendijk with number 7583. The team was one of the first teams to compete in women's football.

Astrio won the first competition, 1971/72, they won from Anderlecht and gained the first national championship. The following year Astio was again the best and claimed the second national championship.

In 1975 they won again and claimed so their third national championship in first 4 years time.

The first unofficial Belgian women's Cup was organised in 1975/75. Astrio faced Saint-Nicolas FC Liège in the final, but lost their final. Since 1977 an official Cup was organized. Saint-Nicolas FC Liège was beaten in 1977 after penalties, and so claimed their first Cup. Also in 1978 en 1979 the Cup went to Astrio.

In the early-1980s it became more difficult for Astrio. The club played the first years sub top but after a while they dropped further down the table. in 1984 they played another Cup final but lost from Brussel D71.

The 1990s were the darkest times for the club. In 1994/95 they have to forfeit and demote to Second Division in 1995/96. They also had to forfeit that year and had to demote to the Provincial Division. And so the team had to leave the National football after 24 years. In 1999 Astrio re-erected again and became champion and returned again to the Second Division. Due a reformation of the Women's League Astrio had to play in the newly formed Third Division.

In 2007 the club name was changed to Ladies Heist-op-den-Berg or Ladies Heist for short. Ladies Heist became second that year but because there was a free spot they got also a Promotion to the Second Division. In 2008 there was a fusion with K.S.K. Heist, who already played several years in the Men's National Division.

In 2011/12 KSK Heist returned after 16 seasons back to First Division and finished 11th place. The next year BeNe Liga was created and became the highest division. KSK Heist stayed in First Division and won 2nd place and in 2013/2014 they finished 3rd.

As for season 2014/2015 KSK Heist finished 6th also the previous formed BeNe League ceased to exist and the Super League Vrouwenvoetbal was formed. KSK Heist got the final ticket for the league and climbed back to the highest division.

In the 2018–19 Belgian Women's Super League, KSK Heist ended last with zero points and only 2 goals made. They were relegated to the Second Division (level 3). After the third season 2021/22 at this level, where they ended ninth, the club decided not to field a women's team anymore in the next season.

== Honour list ==
National championship

winner (3): 1971/72, 1972/73, 1974/75
second (4): 1973/74, 1975/76, 1976/77, 1977/78

Belgian Women's Cup

winner (3): 1977, 1978, 1979
final (1): 1976 (unofficial), 1984
