= KVC Westerlo (women) =

KVC Westerlo Ladies is a Belgian football club from Westerlo, which competes with a number of women's teams. The women's teams are part of football club KVC Westerlo, which is affiliated with KBVB with registration number 2024. The A-team competes in the Belgian Women's Super League, the highest Belgian level, for the first time in the 2024–2025 season.

== History ==
The women's team of KVC Westerlo never played on the top 2 levels of Belgian women's football before the 2022–23 season. That season, coached by the Portuguese Coach Bruno Antunes, Westerlo Ladies played in the First National Division for the first time and immediately finished fifth. Because champion FC Kontich could not be promoted to the Super League, Westerlo was asked to take their place. However, this was refused because the club was not ready for it yet.

But the ambition to reach the highest level was there, and in the summer of 2023 Westerlo took over the coach and a large part of the players from champion FC Kontich. The budget was also increased fivefold.
Westerlo Ladies quickly became champions the following season 2023-24 and were promoted to the Super League for the first time.

After two years in the top division, however, the club decided to take a step back in the 2026/27 season and invest in its own youth at a lower level.

== Season to season ==
Season	Tier	Division	Place	Belgian Cup
2018–19	4	First Provincial Antwerp	2nd	
2019–20	3	Second Division	5th	
2020–21	3	Second Division	--	
2021–22	3	Second Division	1st	Third round
2022–23	2	First Division	5th	Fourth round
2023–24	2	First Division	1st	Round of 16
2024–25	1	Super League	6th	Quarter-final
2025–26	1	Super League	8th	Quarter-final
2026–27	2	First Division	-	-
