= KRC Genk Ladies =

Belgian football club

- Full name: KRC Genk Ladies
- Nickname: Ladies Genk
- Founded: 1971 (Hewian Girls Lanaken); 2007 (Damesvoetbal Lanaken); 2013 (DVL Zonhoven); 2015 (KRC Genk Ladies)
- Ground: Turkse Rangers, Genk
- Chairman: (Belgium) Jules Vanmol
- Manager: (Belgium) Luk Verstraeten
- League: Super League
- 2025-26: 6th
- Website: www.ladiesgenk.be
Home colours

KRC Genk Ladies is a Belgian women's football club based in Genk. It is the women's section of KRC Genk.

The club was formed as a merger of clubs from Lanaken and Zonhoven in 2013, and has been known as Ladies Genk since 2015 when they relocated to Genk. They play in the Super League, the highest level in Belgium.

== Current squad ==
As of 10 July 2026

Note: Flags indicate national team as defined under FIFA eligibility rules; some limited exceptions apply. Players may hold more than one non-FIFA nationality.

No.	Pos.	Nation	Player
2	MF	AUT	Cheyenne Benneker
3	DF	NED	Robine de Ridder
4	MF	BEL	Luna Vanhoudt
5	DF	BEL	Gwyneth Vanaenrode
6	DF	BEL	Chelsea Godier
7	FW	BEL	Thirsa De Meester
9	FW	BEL	Lisa Petry
10	MF	BEL	Sien Vandersanden
12	GK	BEL	Elise Bils
13	FW	BEL	Gwen Duijsters
14	DF	NED	Maud van Berlo
19	DF	BEL	Melissa Mols
20	MF	BEL	Charlotte Tison
23	DF	BEL	Mauranne Marinucci

No.	Pos.	Nation	Player
24	GK	BEL	Hanne Thijs
37	MF	NED	Briony Duijzings-Stauffenberg
43	DF	BEL	Clemence Bartholome
50	GK	BEL	Marn van Wijngaarden
—	GK	BEL	Emma Vanbrabant
—	DF	BEL	Janthe Ruymen
—	DF	BEL	Anne-Laure Jennes
—	MF	BEL	Lyana Salemi
—	MF	BEL	Ella Jacobs
—	MF	BEL	Rose Adewusi
—	FW	BEL	Jinthe Schepers
—	FW	BEL	Lowies Vandekerckhove
—	FW	BEL	Zoë Kasongo
—	FW	BEL	Fran Peeters
