= Oud-Heverlee Leuven (women) =

Belgian football club

OH Leuven
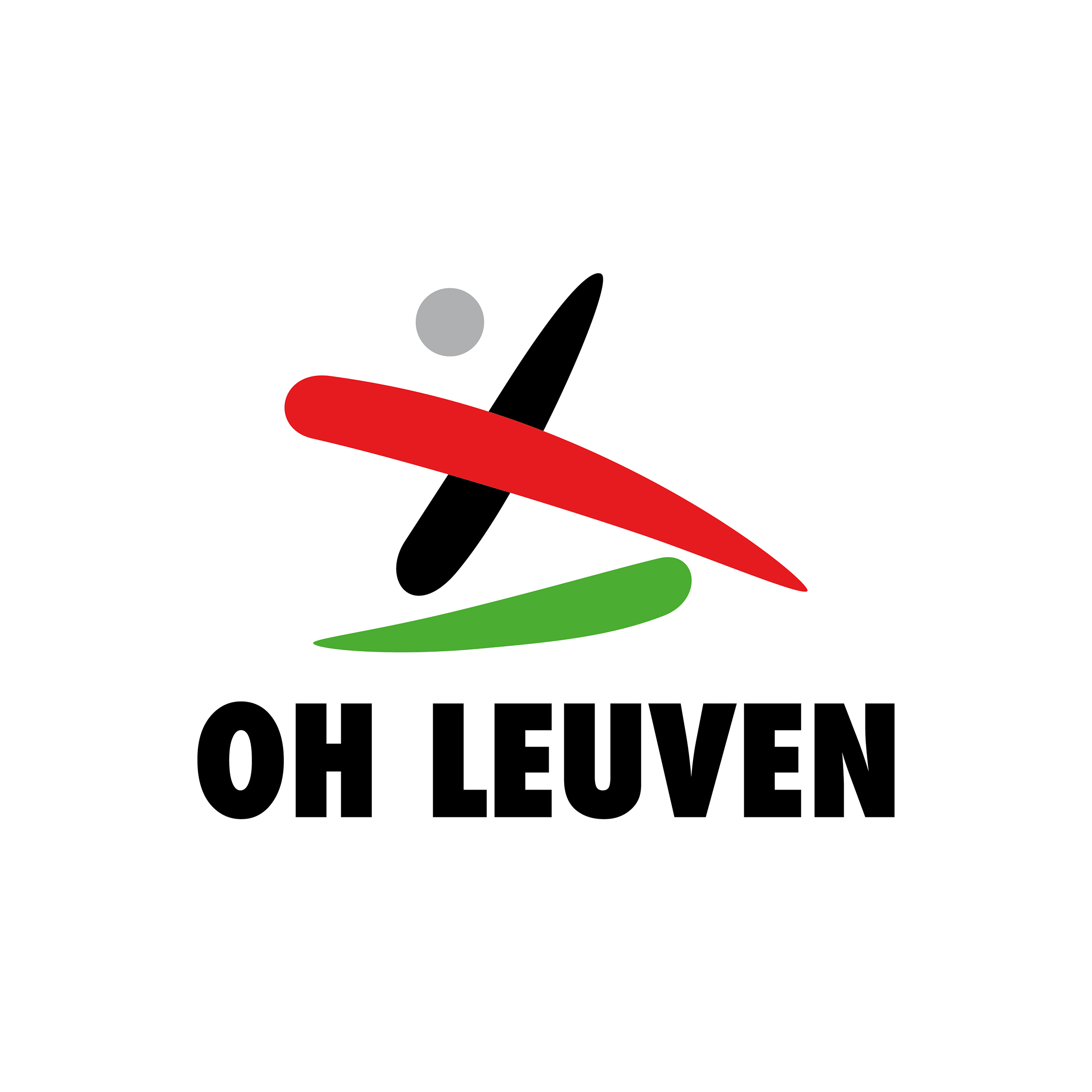
- Full name: Oud-Heverlee Leuven
- Founded: 2002
- Ground: Gemeentelijk Sportstadion
- Chairman: Aiyawatt Srivaddhanaprabha
- Manager: Setareh Habibzadeh
- League: Super League
- 2025–26: 1st (champions)
- Website: ohleuven.com/women
Home colours	Away colours

Oud-Heverlee Leuven Women (Flemish pronunciation: [ʌut ˈɦeːvərˌleː ˈløːvə(n)]), also called OH Leuven or OHL, is a Belgian women's football club from Leuven. The club colours are white. The team plays in the national top division Super League.

== History ==
The club was founded on 1 January 2002 after a merger from the clubs Stade Leuven, Daring Club Leuven and Zwarte Duivels Oud-Heverlee.

== Titles ==
- Super League (2)
  - 2024–25, 2025–26

== Squad ==
As of 9 September 2026

Note: Flags indicate national team as defined under FIFA eligibility rules; some limited exceptions apply. Players may hold more than one non-FIFA nationality.

No.	Pos.	Nation	Player
1	GK	BEL	Faye Lammertijn
2	DF	BEL	Saar Janssen
3	DF	NED	Kim Everaerts
4	DF	HUN	Virág Nagy
5	DF	NED	Kimberley Smit
7	MF	BEL	Alixe Bosteels
8	MF	NED	Manon van Raay
9	FW	SUR	Jada Conijnenberg
10	MF	USA	Camille Lafaix
11	FW	GRE	Ioanna Papatheodorou
12	GK	BEL	Juliette Demol
14	MF	BEL	Axelle Van Besauw
15	DF	BEL	Amélie Van Holderbeke
16	FW	BEL	Kadhiya de Ceuster

No.	Pos.	Nation	Player
17	FW	BEL	Anouk van Praet
18	FW	BEL	Lily Hoekx
19	MF	NED	Jeslynn Kuijpers
20	FW	BEL	Manon Heremans
21	MF	BEL	Flo Hermans
22	MF	BEL	Nel Neyrinck
23	MF	BEL	Lily Verstrepen
24	GK	NED	Lieke Cremers
25	DF	FRA	Agathe Ollivier
26	FW	NED	Isabella Dekker
28	DF	BEL	Sterre Gielen
29	GK	BEL	Lowiese Seynhaeve
30	MF	BEL	Julie Biesmans
—	FW	SWE	Linnea Strömberg

== European campaigns ==
All results (away, home, and aggregate) list OH Leuven's goal tally first.

^{f} indicates the leg played first.

Season	Competition	Round	Opponent	Home	Away	Aggregate
2025–26	UEFA Women's Champions League	Second qualifying round Semi-final	(Bosnia and Herzegovina) SFK 2000	2–1 (a.e.t.)	—N/a	—N/a
2025–26	UEFA Women's Champions League	Second qualifying round Final	(Sweden) Rosengård	3–2	—N/a	—N/a
2025–26	UEFA Women's Champions League	Third qualifying round	(Ukraine) Vorskla Poltava	0–0	2–0 ^{f} (Note: Although officially an away match, this match was played at Den Dreef, as due to the Russian invasion of Ukraine, Ukrainian teams were required to play their home matches at neutral venues until further notice. Vorskla Poltava requested that the first leg be played in Belgium, and OH Leuven agreed.)	2–0
2025–26	UEFA Women's Champions League	League phase	(France) Paris FC	—N/a	2–2	12th
2025–26	UEFA Women's Champions League	League phase	(Netherlands) Twente	2–1	—N/a	12th
2025–26	UEFA Women's Champions League	League phase	(Spain) Barcelona	—N/a	0–3	12th
2025–26	UEFA Women's Champions League	League phase	(Italy) Roma	1–1	—N/a	12th
2025–26	UEFA Women's Champions League	League phase	(France) Paris Saint-Germain	—N/a	0–0	12th
2025–26	UEFA Women's Champions League	League phase	(England) Arsenal	0–3	—N/a	12th
2025–26	UEFA Women's Champions League	Knockout phase play-offs	(England) Arsenal	0–4^{f}	1–3	1–7
2026–27	UEFA Women's Champions League	Second qualifying round Semi-final	(Serbia) ŽFK TSC Bačka Topola	4–0	—N/a	—N/a
2026–27	UEFA Women's Champions League	Second qualifying round Final	(Turkey) Fenerbahçe	1–1 (a.e.t.) (4–2 p)	—N/a	—N/a
2026–27	UEFA Women's Champions League	Third qualifying round	(Poland) Czarni Sosnowiec	2–1	4–1 ^{f}	6–2
2026–27	UEFA Women's Champions League	League phase	(Italy) Roma	0–0	—N/a	
2026–27	UEFA Women's Champions League	League phase	(France) Paris Saint-Germain	—N/a	0–5	
2026–27	UEFA Women's Champions League	League phase	(Switzerland) Servette Chênois	—N/a	1–5	
2026–27	UEFA Women's Champions League	League phase	(Denmark) HB Køge	1–1	—N/a	
2026–27	UEFA Women's Champions League	League phase	(Italy) Juventus	—N/a	0–2	
2026–27	UEFA Women's Champions League	League phase	(England) Chelsea	16 Dec	—N/a	
