= List of Belgium women's international footballers =

List of players of the Belgium women's national football team

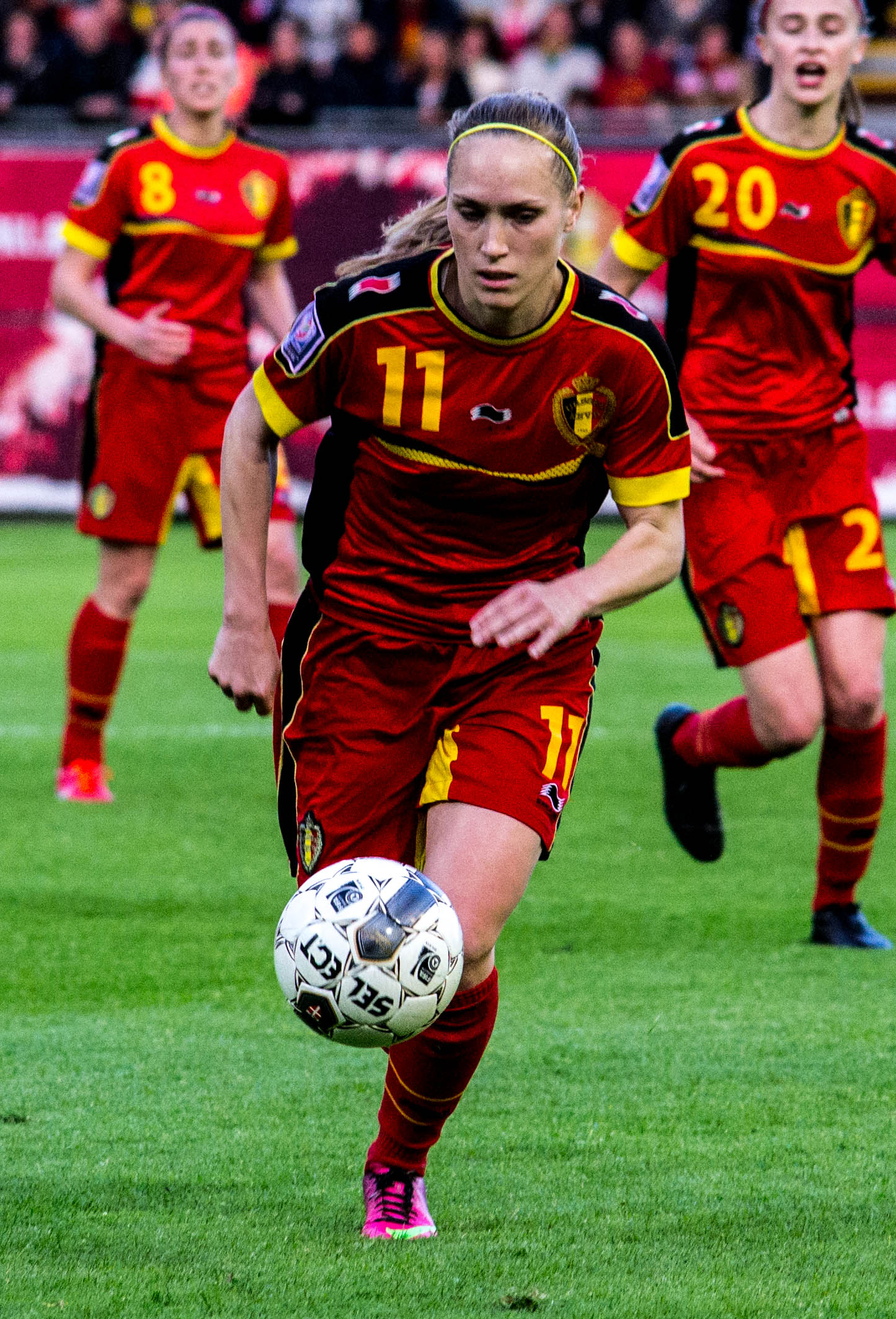
Janice Cayman is the women's overall record holder, with 130 caps as of 06 September 2022.

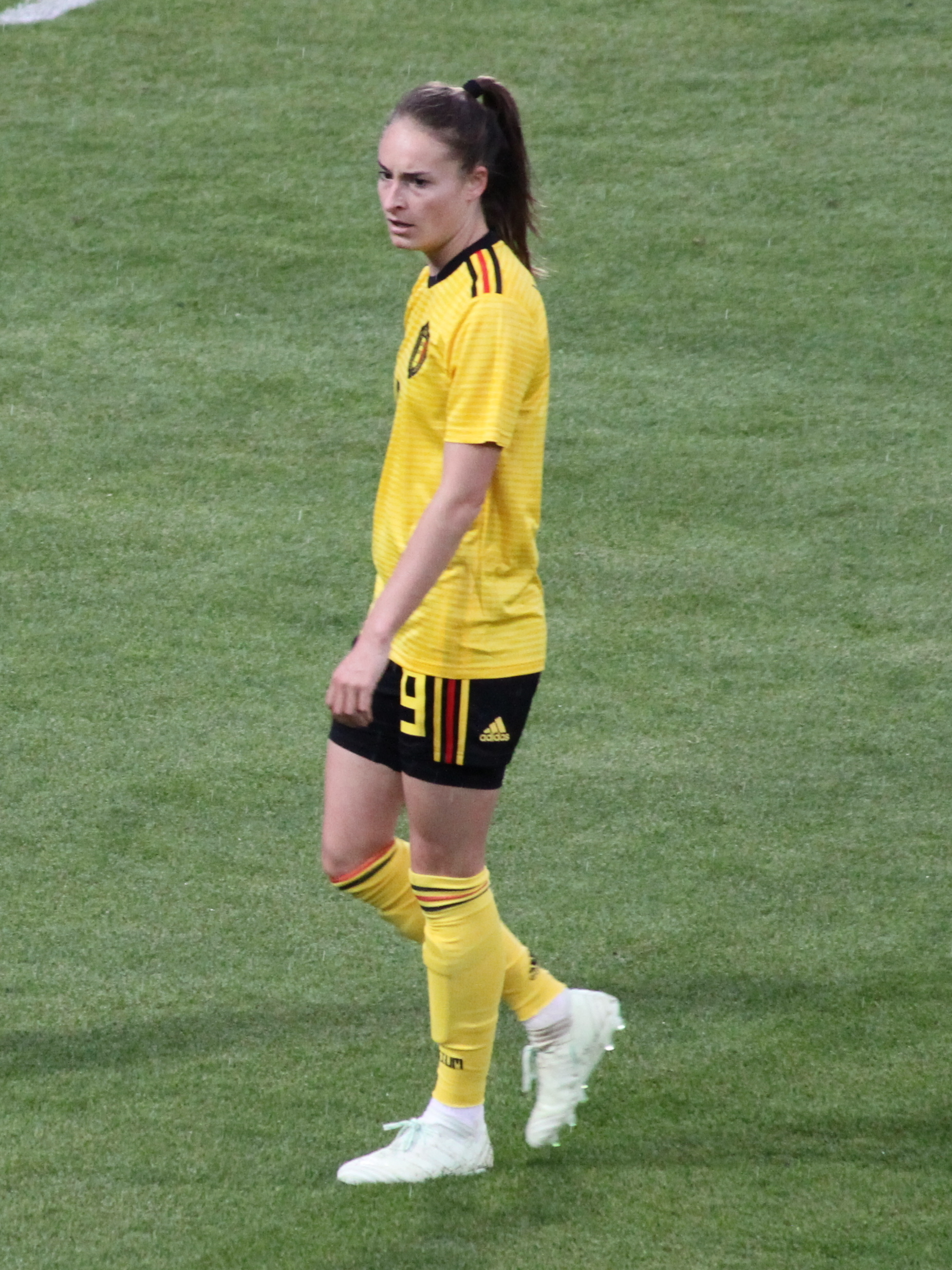
Tessa Wullaert is the all-time top scorer, having scored 93 goals in 146 matches.

The Belgium women's national football team represents Belgium in international women's football. The team is fielded by the Royal Belgian Football Association (KBVB/URBSFA), the governing body of football in Belgium, and competes as a member of the Union of European Football Associations (UEFA). Belgium competed in their first international match on 30 May 1976, a 2–1 win in a friendly against France. More than 260 players have made at least one international appearance for the team.

== List of players ==
This list includes all players who have made at least one appearance for the national team. Players that are still active at the club and/or international level are in bold. All statistics are correct up to and including the match played on 6 September 2022 against Armenia.

Player	Caps	Goals	Debut		Last or most recent match		Ref.
Player	Caps	Goals	Date	Opponent	Date	Opponent	Ref.
Maria-Laura Aga	1	0	27 May 2012		Finland		
Elien Ameye	3	0	1 May 2003	Scotland	11 May 2003	Norway	
Caroline Berrens	2	0	5 August 2012	Wales	8 August 2012	Wales	
Ria Bertels	4	0	18 October 1987	Czechoslovakia	2 April 1988	Czechoslovakia	
Nadine Berten	4	0	15 December 1984	Spain	28 September 1985	Netherlands	
**Julie Biesmans**	98	3	17 September 2011	Hungary	06 sept 2022	Armenia	
**Jassina Blom**	20	8	22 November 2014	Poland	28 Jun 2022	Luxembourg	
Marleen Bodson	1	0	17 October 1991		Netherlands		
Liesbet Borremans	12	0	23 August 2000	Netherlands	21 April 2002	Scotland	
**Constance Brackman**	2	0	10 June 2021	Spain	12 Jun 2021	Luxembourg	
Lien Braem	8	0	18 November 2000	Switzerland	27 November 2002	Netherlands	
Anita Brand	4	0	9 June 1984	France	19 Apr 1995	Greece	
Sabrina Broos	2	0	11 April 2004	Switzerland	20 September 2009	Wales	
Cynthia Browaeys	8	0	22 November 2003	Netherlands	27 May 2012	Finland	
Sabine Bruggeman	3	0	26 February 1997	Italy	23 May 1998	Russia	
Rosalinde Brusselaers	1	0	29 September 1979		Netherlands		
Rita Bultinck	21	1	30 May 1976	France	8 October 1983	Denmark	
Karin Buysschaert	20	0	8 October 1983	Denmark	15 October 1989	Norway	
Annick Caers	7	0	17 May 1997	Greece	17 November 2001	Wales	
Marie-Françoise Caillet	12	0	21 May 1977	Switzerland	6 November 1982	Denmark	
Marijke Callebaut	34	3	16 September 1997	Netherlands	1 April 2010	Czech Republic	
Michèle Canniere	40	0	27 September 1990	Norway	13 November 2002	Italy	
Cécile Carnol	37	12	31 March 1996	Republic of Ireland	6 September 2003	Switzerland	
Anne-Marie Carrette	6	0	31 October 1978	England	29 August 1981	Italy	
Lutgard Catrysse	2	0	30 May 1976	France	5 June 1977	France	
**Estée Cattoor**	1	0	12 June 2021	Luxembourg			
**Janice Cayman**	130	48	5 May 2007	Switzerland	22 july 2022	Sweden	
Gerda Colpaert	2	0	30 May 1976	France	31 October 1978	England	
Annick Coolens	20	0	23 August 1986	Finland	11 October 1997	Russia	
Stephanie Cooymans	3	0	30 October 2005	Poland	31 October 2007	Wales	
Nathalie Cornez	1	0	13 October 1990		Finland		
Jana Coryn	29	2	23 November 2011	Bulgaria	10 April 2018	Italy	
Martine Cotman	10	1	23 August 1986	Finland	13 May 1989	France	
France Cotteaux	14	0	28 May 1993	Moldova	11 October 1997	Russia	
Imke Courtois	20	0	4 November 2006	Portugal	11 July 2017	Russia	
**Maud Coutereels**	90	9	31 August 2005	Finland	7 March 2020	Portugal	
Barbara Cravillon	5	0	28 May 1993	Moldova	22 March 1994	France	
Elke D'Hollander	11	1	17 May 1997	Greece	6 May 2000	Poland	
**Yana Daniëls**	46	7	20 August 2011	Russia	19 February 2022	Wales	
Véronique Davister	12	0	7 April 1990	England	14 May 1994	Slovenia	
Veerle De Block	2	0	6 May 2000	Poland	13 August 2000	Scotland	
**Tine De Caigny**	79	38	8 February 2014	Poland	22 july 2022	Italy	
Niki De Cock	58	4	27 November 2002	Netherlands	11 March 2015	South Korea	
Cécile De Gernier	29	5	24 May 2011	North Korea	7 March 2016	Denmark	
**Taika De Koker**	3	0	27 May 2012	Finland	5 August 2012	Wales	
**Laura De Neve**	58	2	21 September 2013	Albania	22 july 2022	Sweden	
Marjorie De Rammelaere	16	3	9 April 2008	Scotland	19 June 2010	Azerbaijan	
Véronique De Ruyter	1	0	4 October 2000		Netherlands		
Ingrid De Rycke	19	1	24 March 2002	Wales	22 April 2006	Spain	
Ann De Vroede	18	0	9 June 1984	France	14 May 1994	Slovenia	
Angélique De Wulf	1	0	26 October 2011		Norway		
Agnès Debock	12	0	30 May 1976	France	1 May 1980	England	
Pascale Deckx	1	0	15 December 1984		Spain		
Marleen Decorte	2	0	12 June 1982	France	25 September 1982	Netherlands	
Isabelle Deflem	33	0	22 March 1994	France	6 March 2001	Netherlands	
**Féli Delacauw**	11	0	21 February 2021	Germany	06 sept 2022	Armenia	
Dorine Delombaerde	61	0	8 October 1983	Denmark	28 September 1996	Slovakia	
**Laura Deloose**	73	4	23 May 2015	Norway	06 sept 2022	Armenia	
Peggy Demeester	15	1	15 October 1989	Norway	17 April 1995	Greece	
**Silke Demeyere**	4	0	22 November 2014	Poland	4 March 2016	Canada	
Audrey Demoustier	41	4	28 October 2007	Germany	30 November 2015	Serbia	
Marleen Denolf	2	0	12 May 1979	France	29 August 1981	Italy	
Sandra Depauw	11	0	13 November 2002	Italy	22 April 2006	Spain	
Nadia Dermul	59	5	17 March 1990	England	5 May 2007	Switzerland	
Sonia Deschepper	45	2	15 March 1986	France	28 September 1996	Slovakia	
? Desmet	1	0	30 May 1976		France		
**Marie Detruyer**	1	0	12 June 2021	Luxembourg			
Emmanuelle Devaux	4	0	17 March 1990	England	27 September 1990	Norway	
**Elena Dhont**	28	3	7 March 2018	South Africa	06 sept 2022	Armenia	
Lutgart Dierckx	19	0	28 July 1978	Italy	25 August 1984	West Germany	
Louiza Dirckx	15	0	21 May 1977	Switzerland	23 August 1984	West Germany	
Isabel Donvil	2	0	13 March 1999	Switzerland	20 March 2001	Netherlands	
Kim Dossche	1	0	15 June 2011		France		
Conny Dubois	14	0	15 April 1978	France	29 August 1981	Italy	
Lydia Duque	5	1	5 June 1977	France	30 July 1978	Wales	
Isabelle Ebhodaghe	30	6	28 February 1998	Portugal	29 February 2004	Spain	
Ann Eeckhoudt	19	0	24 August 1985	Finland	28 September 1996	Slovakia	
Kristien Elsen	23	1	28 October 2007	Germany	5 April 2014	Albania	
**Hannah Eurlings**	23	5	1 December 2020	Switzerland	06 sept 2022	Armenia	
**Nicky Evrard**	57	0	2 June 2013	Ukraine	06 sept 2022	Armenia	
Anita Frederickx	10	0	8 October 1983	Denmark	23 May 1987	Spain	
Nicole Freson	3	0	20 August 1984	England	25 August 1984	West Germany	
Hildeken Geerinck	3	0	4 May 1985	France	28 September 1985	Netherlands	
**Noemie Gelders**	1	0	24 May 2019		Greece		
Maryse Gevers	34	1	1 May 1980	England	15 October 1989	Norway	
Maria-Theresia Gijbels	1	0	12 June 1982		France		
Jesse Goethals	1	0	25 March 2005		Switzerland		
Julie Grégoire	7	0	26 November 2009	Czech Republic	8 August 2012	Wales	
**Celien Guns**	4	0	2 March 2018	Spain	01 Jun 2019	Thailand	
Catherine Gybels	1	0	9 October 2001		Netherlands		
Sarina Heirbaut	1	0	16 October 1999		Austria		
Inge Heiremans	44	6	16 September 1997	Netherlands	8 August 2012	Wales	
Marieke Helsen	8	0	30 May 1976	France	4 August 1978	Yugoslavia	
Liesbeth Hemelsoet	29	0	17 May 1997	Greece	7 March 2004	Norway	
Inge Hendrix	6	0	13 November 2002	Italy	22 November 2003	Netherlands	
Fabienne Henrard	15	0	11 October 1995	Faroe Islands	29 August 1998	Denmark	
Anne-Marie Horemans	20	0	4 October 1980	Netherlands	9 Apr 1988	Bulgaria	
Monique Huybrechts	4	0	30 May 1976	France	31 October 1978	England	
Ulrika Huygens	10	2	12 April 1997	France	20 March 2001	Netherlands	
Kelly Ickmans	5	0	15 June 2011	France	8 August 2012	Wales	
**Isabelle Iliano**	9	0	22 November 2014	Poland	22 Feb 2022	Russia	
Andréa Janssens	9	0	28 May 1993	Moldova	19 April 1995	Greece	
**Aster Janssens**	1	0	12 June 2021	Luxembourg			
**Jill Janssens**	10	0	10 June 2021	Spain	06 sept 2022	Armenia	
Heleen Jaques	97	3	5 May 2007	Switzerland	1 December 2020	Switzerland	
Lien Kesteloot	1	0	6 June 2010		Netherlands		
Fanny Kimpe	19	6	22 March 1994	France	25 April 2004	Netherlands	
Elsa Kinnaer	8	1	23 May 1987	Spain	13 May 1989	France	
Kristel Laurent	13	0	24 October 1987	France	26 September 1992	Norway	
Odette Ledure	3	0	29 September 1979	Netherlands	4 October 1980	Netherlands	
Christiane Leemans	8	0	12 May 1979	France	25 August 1984	West Germany	
Sofie Lefebvre	1	0	19 June 2010		Azerbaijan		
Corinne Lejeune	3	0	20 September 1986	Netherlands	23 May 1987	Spain	
Natacha Leman	2	0	4 October 2000	Netherlands	27 November 2002	Netherlands	
**Diede Lemey**	7	0	19 January 2017	France	28 Jun 2022	Luxembourg	
Brigite Lemmens	7	0	29 September 1979	Netherlands	23 April 1983	Netherlands	
Riete Loos	5	0	5 September 2009	Romania	23 August 2011	Scotland	
Marianne Luyckx	6	0	4 October 1980	Netherlands	23 April 1983	Netherlands	
Caroline Maes	1	0	1 October 1988		Bulgaria		
Femke Maes	85	25	6 March 1996	Netherlands	26 November 2009	Czech Republic	
Hilde Maes	2	0	11 May 1991	Switzerland	16 November 1991	Switzerland	
Ria Maes	2	0	9 April 1988	Bulgaria	15 October 1989	Norway	
Stéphanie Maes	2	0	20 March 2001	Netherlands	1 May 2001	Italy	
Sophie Mannaert	21	0	24 March 2002	Wales	20 August 2011	Russia	
Laurence Marchal	9	0	18 June 2011	France	20 June 2012	Hungary	
Anita Martens	33	1	12 May 1979	France	12 May 1990	Finland	
Carla Martens	35	6	25 September 1982	Netherlands	13 October 1990	Finland	
Nathalie Mathues	4	0	19 May 1997	Greece	13 August 2000	Scotland	
Carine Maus	36	9	23 May 1987	Spain	28 February 1998	Portugal	
**Amber Maximus**	1	0	17 January 2019	Spain			
Adeline Médard	8	0	4 November 2006	Portugal	13 February 2013	Austria	
Elke Meers	5	0	31 October 2007	Wales	18 June 2011	France	
**Fran Meersman**	1	0	12 June 2021	Luxembourg			
Lien Mermans	48	9	5 September 2009	Romania	11 April 2017	Scotland	
**Zenia Mertens**	3	0	10 June 2021	Spain	25 Nov 2021	Armenia	
Martine Meyfroodt	4	0	25 August 1981	Scotland	8 October 1983	Denmark	
Annick Mievis	3	0	17 April 1995	Greece	13 March 1999	Switzerland	
Wendy Migom	60	6	11 October 1995	Faroe Islands	27 March 2005	Switzerland	
Kenny Minnaert	1	0	14 May 1989		England		
**Marie Minnaert**	31	3	27 February 2019	Slovakia	06 sept 2022	Armenia	
**Kassandra Missipo**	43	0	3 June 2016	Estonia	06 sept 2022	Armenia	
Sarah Moens	2	0	3 May 2003	Scotland	27 March 2005	Switzerland	
Liesbeth Molenberghs	1	0	27 March 2005		Switzerland		
Elke Muermans	4	0	13 September 1998	Yugoslavia	23 August 2000	Netherlands	
Anne Muller	2	0	25 August 1981	Scotland	29 August 1981	Italy	
Riana Nainggolan	1	0	6 March 2015		South Africa		
Christine Nelis	1	0	18 May 1996		Faroe Islands		
Anne Noë	59	0	29 September 1979	Netherlands	14 May 1994	Slovenia	
Marinella Nuytten	3	0	15 March 1986	France	23 May 1987	Spain	
**Justien Odeurs**	44	0	22 November 2014	Poland	21 Sept 2021	Albania	
Liesbeth Onclin	1	0	1 May 2001		Italy		
Lenie Onzia	62	4	6 September 2006	Scotland	28 june 2022	Luxembourg	
Daniella Ottoy	19	0	30 May 1976	France	14 May 1989	England	
Kelly Paulus	3	0	24 May 2011	North Korea	20 August 2011	Russia	
**Fleur Pauwels**	1	0	12 June 2021	Luxembourg			
Cindy Peeters	1	0	16 September 1997		Netherlands		
Heidi Peeters	7	0	27 November 2002	Netherlands	7 March 2004	Norway	
Inge Peeters	2	0	20 September 1986	Netherlands	1 October 1986	Sweden	
Martine Peeters	1	0	14 May 1994		Slovenia		
**Lisa Petry**	1	0	7 March 2020	Portugal			
**Davina Philtjens**	114	10	17 February 2008	Wales	06 sept 2022	Armenia	
Petra Poelmans	1	0	19 May 1997		Greece		
Jeannine Poesen	16	1	12 June 1982	France	23 August 1986	Finland	
Anne Puttemans	10	1	9 April 2004	Switzerland	19 June 2010	Azerbaijan	
Nadia Puttemans	19	0	17 April 1995	Greece	13 September 1998	Yugoslavia	
Albertine Reyns	3	0	28 July 1978	Italy	12 May 1979	France	
Wendy Roden	17	5	19 April 1995	Greece	13 March 1999	Switzerland	
Nele Saelen	2	0	6 March 2001	Netherlands	1 May 2001	Italy	
Christine Saelens	41	13	28 May 1993	Moldova	22 November 2003	Netherlands	
Elly Schmidtmayer	5	0	28 May 1993	Moldova	13 March 1994	England	
Nathalie Schrymecker	16	3	15 December 1984	Spain	12 May 1990	Finland	
Tine Schryvers	7	3	4 March 2016	Canada	23 Oct 2016	Russia	
Anneleen Segers	2	0	9 April 2008	Scotland	7 May 2008	Germany	
Lynn Senaeve	5	0	24 May 2011	North Korea	19 September 2012	Northern Ireland	
Maria Seymus	15	0	30 May 1976	France	25 September 1982	Netherlands	
Wendy Seynaeve	21	3	28 October 2001	Austria	26 March 2006	Denmark	
**Zandy Soree**	4	0	19 January 2017	France	10 Mar 2020	Denmark	
Daniela Specogna	4	0	13 March 1994	England	14 May 1994	Slovenia	
Berit Stevens	6	0	31 August 2005	Finland	23 August 2011	Scotland	
Evelien Stoffels	2	0	4 November 2006	Portugal	8 August 2012	Wales	
Nancy Struylaart	2	0	13 August 2000	Scotland	23 August 2000	Netherlands	
Martine Symons	3	0	30 May 1976	France	4 August 1978	Yugoslavia	
**Auke Swevers**	1	0	12 June 2021	Luxembourg			
Sandra Temmerman	7	0	31 October 1978	England	27 October 1980	Republic of Ireland	
**Jarne Teulings**	9	2	27 October 2020	Lithuania	12 Apr 2022	Kosovo	
Krista Thys	12	0	1 October 1986	Sweden	14 May 1989	England	
Yanick Tijtgat	1	0	21 August 1984		Italy		
Annelies Timmermans	58	1	28 May 1993	Moldova	1 April 2010	Czech Republic	
**Charlotte Tison**	13	0	19 January 2017	France	28 Jun 2022	Luxembourg	
Katrien Torfs	5	0	19 June 2010	Azerbaijan	27 March 2009	Romania	
Joséphine Trus	1	0	4 October 1980		Netherlands		
**Amber Tysiak**	18	5	18 February 2021	Netherlands	02 sept 2022	Norway	
Jacqueline Van Assche	1	0	12 June 1982		France		
**Lyndsey Van Belle**	1	0	12 June 2021	Luxembourg			
**Shari Van Belle**	12	0	17 January 2019	Spain	22 Feb 2022	Russia	
Stefanie Van Broeck	14	0	24 May 2011	North Korea	2 June 2013	Ukraine	
Peggy Van De Maelen	14	0	29 September 1979	Netherlands	20 September 1986	Netherlands	
Lorca Van De Putte	55	2	27 March 2009	Romania	11 July 2017	Russia	
**Nicky Van Den Abbeele**	34	0	2 June 2013	Ukraine	7 March 2018	South Africa	
Tinne Van Den Bergh	2	0	8 February 2014	Poland	22 November 2014	Poland	
Tina Van Der Auwera	4	0	29 February 2004	Spain	7 May 2008	Germany	
? Van Dingenen	1	0	30 May 1976		France		
Sonja Van Dormael	1	0	30 July 1978		Wales		
Stéphanie Van Gils	4	1	18 June 2011	France	23 November 2011	Bulgaria	
**Elke Van Gorp**	30	7	13 September 2014	Greece	29 Aug 2019	England	
Lies Van Hamme	2	0	15 June 2011	France	18 June 2011	France	
Ingrid Van Herle	46	5	1 October 1988	Bulgaria	6 November 1999	Poland	
Sofie Van Houtven	25	0	23 April 2008	Netherlands	8 March 2017	Austria	
Gertie Van Humbeeck	17	3	3 May 2003	Scotland	5 May 2007	Switzerland	
**Ella Van Kerkhoven**	21	12	31 August 2018	Romania	06 sept 2022	Armenia	
Annick Van Laethem	13	4	17 March 1990	England	14 May 1994	Slovenia	
**Annelies Van Loock**	2	0	27 May 2012	Finland	5 August 2012	Wales	
Gave Van Poucke	37	0	6 March 2001	Netherlands	27 March 2009	Romania	
Peggy Van Puymbroeck	2	0	13 March 1994	England	17 April 1995	Greece	
Ann Van Rijmenam	3	0	21 May 1977	Switzerland	17 October 1981	Republic of Ireland	
Katrien Van Rooy	8	0	28 October 2001	Austria	27 March 2005	Switzerland	
Elien Van Wynendaele	19	1	11 March 2015	South Korea	11 July 2017	Russia	
Jeanine Vanbuel	17	1	30 May 1976	France	12 June 1982	France	
**Chloë Vande Velde**	26	2	19 January 2017	France	06 sept 2022	Armenia	
Hanne Vandegoor	37	1	7 March 2004	Norway	19 June 2010	Azerbaijan	
Audrey Vanden Broeke	10	1	23 May 1998	Russia	6 May 2000	Poland	
Connie Vandenbroeck	8	0	22 October 1983	West Germany	24 August 1985	Finland	
Tania Vandenhouwe	8	0	1 May 2001	Italy	31 October 2007	Wales	
Petra Vanelderen	7	0	25 September 2005	Denmark	23 September 2006	Poland	
**Jody Vangheluwe**	13	0	1 March 2019	Austria	18 Jul 2022	Italy	
**Justine Vanhaevermaet**	40	6	14 August 2013	Austria	06 sept 2022	Armenia	
Yvonne Vankerkhoven	3	0	30 May 1976	France	5 June 1977	France	
**Davinia Vanmechelen**	49	10	24 November 2016	Netherlands	06 sept 2022	Armenia	
Lore Vanschoenwinkel	14	0	18 June 2011	France	8 February 2014	Poland	
Myriam Vanslembrouck	21	16	11 April 1992	Switzerland	18 May 1996	Faroe Islands	
Christine Vansteenkiste	1	0	9 June 1984		France		
Carine Vanstraelen	20	2	27 September 1990	Norway	14 May 1994	Slovenia	
**Silke Vanwynsberghe**	7	0	2 March 2018	Spain	22 Feb 2022	Russia	
**Luna Vanzeir**	1	0	12 June 2021	Luxembourg			
Kristel Vautmans	51	2	28 May 1993	Moldova	22 November 2003	Netherlands	
Kimberly Verbist	3	0	27 May 2012	Finland	8 August 2012	Wales	
Marlies Verbruggen	40	1	4 November 2006	Portugal	9 March 2016	Russia	
Marina Verdonck	53	10	30 May 1976	France	13 October 1990	Finland	
Kristel Verelst	46	18	23 May 1998	Russia	26 November 2009	Czech Republic	
Ann Verrept	21	2	26 February 1997	Italy	18 November 2000	Switzerland	
Cindy Versauw	1	0	26 September 2004		Denmark		
Lindsay Versichel	11	0	6 March 2001	Netherlands	29 February 2004	Spain	
Inneke Vincke	2	0	1 May 2003	Scotland	3 May 2003	Scotland	
Sindy Vlems	1	0	17 April 1995		Greece		
**Lola Wajnblum**	8	0	16 September 2015	Poland	18 Sep 2020	Romania	
Eva Wanderstein	6	0	17 May 1997	Greece	9 October 2001	Netherlands	
Monique Weetjens	12	0	4 October 1980	Netherlands	22 October 1983	West Germany	
**Anaëlle Wiard**	16	5	17 September 2011	Hungary	9 March 2016	Russia	
**Sarah Wijnants**	26	2	19 January 2017	France	02 sept 2022	Norway	
Evi Willekens	8	0	17 May 1997	Greece	9 October 2001	Netherlands	
Maggy Willekens	1	0	9 October 1991		Germany		
Veerle Willekens	2	0	28 March 2010	Wales	1 April 2010	Czech Republic	
**Willeke Willems**	1	0	13 February 2013		Austria		
Katryn Windey	14	0	1 May 2001	Italy	23 September 2006	Poland	
**Tessa Wullaert**	115	68	20 August 2011	Russia	06 sept 2022	Armenia	
Eva Wylein	2	0	17 May 1997	Greece	19 May 1997	Greece	
Katty Yde	16	4	18 October 1987	Czechoslovakia	6 March 1996	Netherlands	
Sara Yuceil	21	2	11 February 2015	Spain	11 April 2017	Scotland	
Aline Zeler	111	29	31 August 2005	Finland	1 June 2019	Thailand	

== See also ==
- Category:Belgium women's international footballers
