= UEFA Women's Euro 2017 Group A =

Football tournament group stage

Group A of UEFA Women's Euro 2017 contained Belgium, Denmark, Netherlands and Norway. The matches were played from 16 to 24 July 2017.

== Teams ==
Draw position	Team	Method of qualification	Date of qualification	Finals appearance	Last appearance	Previous best performance	UEFA ranking for final draw	FIFA ranking at start of event
A1	Netherlands	Hosts	4 December 2014	3rd	2013	Semi-finals (2009)	9	12
A2	Norway	Group 8 winners	7 June 2016	11th	2013	Champions (1987, 1993)	4	11
A3	Belgium	Group 7 runners-up	16 September 2016	1st	—	Debut	14	22
A4	Denmark	Group 4 runners-up	20 September 2016	9th	2013	Semi-finals (1984, 2001, 2013)	12	15

== Standings ==
Pos	Team	Pld	W	D	L	GF	GA	GD	Pts	Qualification
1	Netherlands (H)	3	3	0	0	4	1	+3	9	Knockout stage
2	Denmark	3	2	0	1	2	1	+1	6	Knockout stage
3	Belgium	3	1	0	2	3	3	0	3	
4	Norway	3	0	0	3	0	4	−4	0	

Source: UEFA
Rules for classification: Group stage tiebreakers
(H) Hosts

In the quarter-finals:

- The winners of Group A, Netherlands, advance to play the runners-up of Group B, Sweden.
- The runners-up of Group A, Denmark, advance to play the winners of Group B, Germany.

== Matches ==
All times are local (UTC+2).

=== Netherlands vs Norway ===
16 July 2017
18:00

Netherlands	1–0	Norway
Van de Sanden 66'	Report

Stadion Galgenwaard, Utrecht
Attendance: 21,732
Referee: Stéphanie Frappart (France)

Netherlands	Norway

GK	1	Sari van Veenendaal
RB	2	Desiree van Lunteren
CB	6	Anouk Dekker
CB	4	Mandy van den Berg (c)		(substituted off) 80'
LB	5	Kika van Es
RM	14	Jackie Groenen	(yellow card) 90+1'
CM	10	Daniëlle van de Donk		(substituted off) 90+1'
LM	8	Sherida Spitse
RF	7	Shanice van de Sanden		(substituted off) 77'
CF	9	Vivianne Miedema
LF	11	Lieke Martens
Substitutions:
FW	21	Lineth Beerensteyn		(substituted on) 77'
DF	3	Stefanie van der Gragt		(substituted on) 80'
MF	12	Jill Roord		(substituted on) 90+1'
Manager:
Sarina Wiegman

GK	1	Ingrid Hjelmseth
RB	2	Ingrid Moe Wold
CB	6	Maren Mjelde (c)
CB	11	Nora Holstad Berge
LB	9	Elise Thorsnes
DM	3	Maria Thorisdottir
CM	7	Ingrid Schjelderup		(substituted off) 75'
CM	18	Frida Leonhardsen Maanum		(substituted off) 58'
AM	10	Caroline Graham Hansen
CF	14	Ada Hegerberg	(yellow card) 9'
CF	17	Kristine Minde		(substituted off) 66'
Substitutions:
MF	19	Ingvild Isaksen		(substituted on) 58'
FW	20	Emilie Haavi		(substituted on) 66'
MF	4	Guro Reiten		(substituted on) 75'
Manager:
Martin Sjögren

Player of the Match:
Lieke Martens (Netherlands)

Assistant referees:
Angela Kyriakou (Cyprus)
Manuela Nicolosi (Italy)
Fourth official:
Anastasia Pustovoitova (Russia)

=== Denmark vs Belgium ===
16 July 2017
20:45

Denmark	1–0	Belgium
Troelsgaard 6'	Report

De Vijverberg, Doetinchem
Attendance: 5,054
Referee: Kateryna Monzul (Ukraine)

Denmark	Belgium

GK	1	Stina Lykke Petersen
RB	5	Simone Boye Sørensen
CB	3	Janni Arnth Jensen
LB	2	Line Røddik Hansen	(yellow card) 65'
CM	7	Sanne Troelsgaard Nielsen
CM	17	Line Sigvardsen Jensen
RW	8	Theresa Nielsen	(yellow card) 86'
AM	10	Pernille Harder (c)
LW	11	Katrine Veje
CF	12	Stine Larsen		(substituted off) 59'
CF	9	Nadia Nadim	(yellow card) 51'	(substituted off) 70'
Substitutions:
MF	4	Maja Kildemoes	(yellow card) 89'	(substituted on) 59'
DF	15	Frederikke Thøgersen		(substituted on) 70'
Manager:
Nils Nielsen

GK	1	Justien Odeurs
RB	4	Maud Coutereels
CB	10	Aline Zeler (c)
CB	3	Heleen Jaques
LB	2	Davina Philtjens	(yellow card) 83'	(substituted off) 86'
RM	20	Julie Biesmans		(substituted off) 82'
CM	6	Tine De Caigny
CM	8	Lenie Onzia
LM	7	Elke Van Gorp		(substituted off) 62'
CF	9	Tessa Wullaert
CF	11	Janice Cayman
Substitutions:
FW	14	Davinia Vanmechelen		(substituted on) 62'
FW	17	Jana Coryn		(substituted on) 82'
FW	15	Yana Daniels		(substituted on) 86'
Manager:
Ives Serneels

Player of the Match:
Sanne Troelsgaard Nielsen (Denmark)

Assistant referees:
Maryna Striletska (Ukraine)
Oleksandra Ardasheva (Ukraine)
Fourth official:
Lorraine Clark (Scotland)

=== Norway vs Belgium ===
20 July 2017
18:00

Norway	0–2	Belgium
	Report	Van Gorp 59'; Cayman 67'

Rat Verlegh Stadion, Breda
Attendance: 8,477
Referee: Monika Mularczyk (Poland)

Norway	Belgium

GK	1	Ingrid Hjelmseth
RB	2	Ingrid Moe Wold		(substituted off) 46'
CB	11	Nora Holstad Berge
CB	22	Ingrid Marie Spord
LB	9	Elise Thorsnes		(substituted off) 75'
RM	7	Ingrid Schjelderup		(substituted off) 79'
CM	6	Maren Mjelde (c)
LM	8	Andrine Hegerberg
AM	10	Caroline Graham Hansen
CF	14	Ada Hegerberg
CF	17	Kristine Minde
Substitutions:
DF	16	Anja Sønstevold	(yellow card) 90'	(substituted on) 46'
FW	20	Emilie Haavi		(substituted on) 75'
FW	15	Lisa-Marie Karlseng Utland		(substituted on) 79'
Manager:
Martin Sjögren

GK	1	Justien Odeurs
RB	22	Laura Deloose
CB	10	Aline Zeler (c)	(yellow card) 23'
CB	3	Heleen Jaques	(yellow card) 48'
LB	4	Maud Coutereels
RM	7	Elke Van Gorp		(substituted off) 88'
CM	8	Lenie Onzia
CM	6	Tine De Caigny
LM	2	Davina Philtjens		(substituted off) 76'
CF	11	Janice Cayman		(substituted off) 90+5'
CF	9	Tessa Wullaert
Substitutions:
FW	17	Jana Coryn		(substituted on) 76'
FW	15	Yana Daniels		(substituted on) 88'
MF	20	Julie Biesmans		(substituted on) 90+5'
Manager:
Ives Serneels

Player of the Match:
Tessa Wullaert (Belgium)

Assistant referees:
Anna Gorska (Poland)
Michelle O'Neill (Ireland)
Fourth official:
Lina Lehtovaara (Finland)

=== Netherlands vs Denmark ===
20 July 2017
20:45

Netherlands	1–0	Denmark
Spitse 20' (pen.)	Report

Sparta Stadion Het Kasteel, Rotterdam
Attendance: 10,599
Referee: Riem Hussein (Germany)

Netherlands	Denmark

GK	1	Sari van Veenendaal
RB	2	Desiree van Lunteren
CB	6	Anouk Dekker
CB	4	Mandy van den Berg (c)	(substituted off) 54'
LB	5	Kika van Es
RM	14	Jackie Groenen
CM	10	Daniëlle van de Donk
LM	8	Sherida Spitse
RF	7	Shanice van de Sanden	(substituted off) 88'
CF	9	Vivianne Miedema
LF	11	Lieke Martens	(substituted off) 78'
Substitutions:
DF	3	Stefanie van der Gragt	(substituted on) 54'
FW	13	Renate Jansen	(substituted on) 78'
FW	21	Lineth Beerensteyn	(substituted on) 88'
Manager:
Sarina Wiegman

GK	1	Stina Lykke Petersen
RB	8	Theresa Nielsen
CB	5	Simone Boye Sørensen	(yellow card) 82'
CB	18	Mie Leth Jans
LB	19	Cecilie Sandvej
RM	7	Sanne Troelsgaard Nielsen	(yellow card) 49'
CM	17	Line Sigvardsen Jensen
CM	6	Nanna Christiansen		(substituted off) 64'
LM	11	Katrine Veje		(substituted off) 69'
CF	9	Nadia Nadim
CF	10	Pernille Harder (c)
Substitutions:
DF	4	Maja Kildemoes	(yellow card) 77'	(substituted on) 64'
FW	12	Stine Larsen		(substituted on) 69'
Manager:
Nils Nielsen

Player of the Match:
Sari van Veenendaal (Netherlands)

Assistant referees:
Christina Biehl (Germany)
Chrysoula Kourompylia (Greece)
Fourth official:
Carina Vitulano (Italy)

=== Belgium vs Netherlands ===
24 July 2017
20:45

Belgium	1–2	Netherlands
Wullaert 59'	Report	Spitse 27' (pen.); Martens 74'

Koning Willem II Stadion, Tilburg
Attendance: 12,697
Referee: Bibiana Steinhaus (Germany)

Belgium	Netherlands

GK	1	Justien Odeurs
RB	22	Laura Deloose	(yellow card) 54'
CB	10	Aline Zeler (c)
CB	3	Heleen Jaques
LB	4	Maud Coutereels		(substituted off) 46'
RM	7	Elke Van Gorp		(substituted off) 57'
CM	8	Lenie Onzia		(substituted off) 76'
CM	6	Tine De Caigny
LM	2	Davina Philtjens
CF	11	Janice Cayman
CF	9	Tessa Wullaert
Substitutions:
FW	14	Davinia Vanmechelen		(substituted on) 46'
FW	17	Jana Coryn		(substituted on) 57'
FW	15	Yana Daniels		(substituted on) 76'
Manager:
Ives Serneels

GK	1	Sari van Veenendaal
RB	22	Liza van der Most
CB	6	Anouk Dekker	(yellow card) 32'
CB	3	Stefanie van der Gragt	(yellow card) 88'
LB	5	Kika van Es
RM	14	Jackie Groenen		(substituted off) 80'
CM	10	Danielle van de Donk	(yellow card) 61'	(substituted off) 75'
LM	8	Sherida Spitse (c)
RF	7	Shanice van de Sanden
CF	9	Vivianne Miedema	(yellow card) 72'	(substituted off) 86'
LF	11	Lieke Martens
Substitutions:
MF	17	Kelly Zeeman		(substituted on) 75'
MF	12	Jill Roord		(substituted on) 80'
FW	18	Vanity Lewerissa		(substituted on) 86'
Manager:
Sarina Wiegman

Player of the Match:
Lieke Martens (Netherlands)

Assistant referees:
Katrin Rafalski (Germany)
Sian Massey (England)
Fourth official:
Kateryna Monzul (Ukraine)

=== Norway vs Denmark ===
24 July 2017
20:45

Norway	0–1	Denmark
	Report	Veje 5'

De Adelaarshorst, Deventer
Attendance: 5,885
Referee: Stéphanie Frappart (France)

Norway	Denmark

GK	1	Ingrid Hjelmseth
RB	17	Kristine Minde
CB	11	Nora Holstad Berge
CB	3	Maria Thorisdottir
LB	2	Ingrid Moe Wold
RM	7	Ingrid Schjelderup		(substituted off) 56'
CM	22	Ingrid Marie Spord		(substituted off) 79'
LM	6	Maren Mjelde (c)	(yellow card) 90+5'
RF	10	Caroline Graham Hansen
CF	14	Ada Hegerberg
LF	4	Guro Reiten
Substitutions:
MF	18	Frida Maanum		(substituted on) 56'
FW	15	Lisa-Marie Karlseng Utland		(substituted on) 79'
Manager:
Martin Sjögren

GK	1	Stina Lykke Petersen
RB	8	Theresa Nielsen
CB	5	Simone Boye Sørensen
CB	12	Stine Larsen
LB	2	Line Røddik Hansen
CM	7	Sanne Troelsgaard Nielsen
CM	17	Line Sigvardsen Jensen
RW	15	Frederikke Thøgersen	(substituted off) 78'
LW	11	Katrine Veje	(substituted off) 90+2'
CF	9	Nadia Nadim	(substituted off) 81'
CF	10	Pernille Harder (c)
Substitutions:
FW	14	Nicoline Sørensen	(substituted on) 78'
DF	19	Cecilie Sandvej	(substituted on) 81'
MF	6	Nanna Christiansen	(substituted on) 90+2'
Manager:
Nils Nielsen

Player of the Match:
Pernille Harder (Denmark)

Assistant referees:
Petruta Iugulescu (Romania)
Mihaela Tepusa (Romania)
Fourth official:
Lorraine Clark (Scotland)
