= 2017–18 in Belgian football =

Football in Belgium
- Season: 2017–18

Men's football
- First Division A: Club Brugge
- First Division B: Cercle Brugge
- First Amateur Division: Knokke
- Second Amateur Division: Rupel Boom (A), Tessenderlo (B) and RWDM47 (C)
- Third Amateur Division: Menen (A), Heur-Tongeren (B), La Louvière (C) and Tilleur (D)
- Cup: Standard Liège
- Super Cup: Anderlecht

The following article is a summary of the 2017–18 football season in Belgium, which is the 1145th season of competitive football in the country and runs from July 2017 until June 2018.

== National teams ==
=== Belgium national football team ===
Belgium qualified for the 2018 FIFA World Cup following a 1–2 win in and against Greece on 3 September 2017. Being seeded, Belgium was then paired with England, Panama and Tunisia in Group G.

==== 2018 FIFA World Cup qualification ====
Pos	Team	Pld	W	D	L	GF	GA	GD	Pts	Qualification	Belgium	Greece	Bosnia and Herzegovina	Estonia	Cyprus	Gibraltar
1	Belgium	10	9	1	0	43	6	+37	28	Qualification to 2018 FIFA World Cup	—	1–1	4–0	8–1	4–0	9–0
2	Greece	10	5	4	1	17	6	+11	19	Advance to second round	1–2	—	1–1	0–0	2–0	4–0
3	Bosnia and Herzegovina	10	5	2	3	24	13	+11	17		3–4	0–0	—	5–0	2–0	5–0
4	Estonia	10	3	2	5	13	19	−6	11		0–2	0–2	1–2	—	1–0	4–0
5	Cyprus	10	3	1	6	9	18	−9	10		0–3	1–2	3–2	0–0	—	3–1
6	Gibraltar	10	0	0	10	3	47	−44	0		0–6	1–4	0–4	0–6	1–2	—

Source: FIFA
Rules for classification: Qualification tiebreakers

31 August 2017	Belgium	9–0	Gibraltar	Stade Maurice Dufrasne, Liège
20:45 (20:45 UTC+2)	Mertens 16'; Meunier 18', 61', 67'; R. Lukaku 21', 38', 82' (pen.); Witsel 27'; E. Hazard 45'	Report (FIFA); Report (UEFA)		Attendance: 24,050; Referee: Neil Doyle (Republic of Ireland)

3 September 2017	Greece	1–2	Belgium	Karaiskakis Stadium, Piraeus
20:45 (21:45 UTC+3)	Zeca 73'	Report (FIFA); Report (UEFA)	Vertonghen 70'; Lukaku 74'	Attendance: 29,465; Referee: Szymon Marciniak (Poland)

7 October 2017	Bosnia and Herzegovina	3–4	Belgium	Stadion Grbavica, Sarajevo (Note: Bosnia and Herzegovina were sanctioned by FIFA to play one home match (against Belgium on 7 October 2017) away from Bilino Polje Stadium, Zenica due to a series of incidents during their home match against Greece.)
18:00 (18:00 UTC+2)	Medunjanin 30'; Višća 39'; Đumić 82'	Report (FIFA); Report (UEFA)	Meunier 4'; Batshuayi 59'; Vertonghen 68'; Carrasco 84'	Attendance: 9,657; Referee: Willie Collum (Scotland)

10 October 2017	Belgium	4–0	Cyprus	King Baudouin Stadium, Brussels
20:45 (20:45 UTC+2)	E. Hazard 12', 63' (pen.); T. Hazard 52'; Lukaku 78'	Report (FIFA); Report (UEFA)		Attendance: 37,765; Referee: Luca Banti (Italy)

==== 2018 FIFA World Cup ====
===== Group stage =====
Pos	Team	Pld	W	D	L	GF	GA	GD	Pts	Qualification
1	Belgium	3	3	0	0	9	2	+7	9	Advance to knockout stage
2	England	3	2	0	1	8	3	+5	6	Advance to knockout stage
3	Tunisia	3	1	0	2	5	8	−3	3	
4	Panama	3	0	0	3	2	11	−9	0	

Source: FIFA
Rules for classification: Group stage tiebreakers
18 June 2018
18:00 MSK (UTC+3)

Belgium	3–0	Panama
Mertens 47'; Lukaku 69', 75'

Fisht Olympic Stadium, Sochi
Attendance: 43,257
Referee: Janny Sikazwe (Zambia)
23 June 2018
15:00 MSK (UTC+3)

Belgium	5–2	Tunisia
E. Hazard 6' (pen.), 51'; Lukaku 16', 45+3'; Batshuayi 90'		Bronn 18'; Khazri 90+3'

Otkritie Arena, Moscow
Attendance: 44,190
Referee: Jair Marrufo (United States)
28 June 2018
20:00 KALT (UTC+2)

England	0–1	Belgium
		Januzaj 51'

Kaliningrad Stadium, Kaliningrad
Attendance: 33,973
Referee: Damir Skomina (Slovenia)

===== Knockout stage =====
2 July 2018
21:00 MSK (UTC+3)

Belgium	3–2	Japan
Vertonghen 69'; Fellaini 74'; Chadli 90+4'		Haraguchi 48'; Inui 52'

Rostov Arena, Rostov-on-Don
Attendance: 41,466
Referee: Malang Diedhiou (Senegal)
6 July 2018
21:00 MSK (UTC+3)

Brazil	1–2	Belgium
Renato Augusto 76'		Fernandinho 13' (o.g.); De Bruyne 31'

Kazan Arena, Kazan
Attendance: 42,873
Referee: Milorad Mažić (Serbia)
10 July 2018
21:00 MSK (UTC+3)

France	1–0	Belgium
Umtiti 51'

Krestovsky Stadium, Saint Petersburg
Attendance: 64,286
Referee: Andrés Cunha (Uruguay)
14 July 2018
17:00 MSK (UTC+3)

Belgium	2–0	England
Meunier 4'; E. Hazard 82'

Krestovsky Stadium, Saint Petersburg
Attendance: 64,406
Referee: Alireza Faghani (Iran)

==== Friendlies ====
10 November 2017 Friendly	Belgium	3–3	Mexico	Brussels, Belgium
20:45 (UTC+1)	E. Hazard 17'; Lukaku 55', 70'	Report	Guardado 38'; Lozano 56', 60'	Stadium: King Baudouin Stadium; Referee: Paolo Mazzoleni (Italy)

14 November 2017 Friendly	Belgium	1–0	Japan	Bruges, Belgium
20:45 (UTC+1)	Lukaku 72'	Report		Stadium: Jan Breydel Stadium; Referee: Danny Makkelie (Netherlands)

27 March 2018 Friendly	Belgium	4–0	Saudi Arabia	Brussels, Belgium
20:45 UTC+2	Lukaku 13', 39'; Batshuayi 77'; De Bruyne 78'	Report		Stadium: King Baudouin Stadium; Attendance: 23,000; Referee: Matej Jug (Slovenia)

2 June 2018 Friendly	Belgium	0–0	Portugal	Brussels, Belgium
20:45 UTC+2		Report		Stadium: King Baudouin Stadium; Attendance: 50,000; Referee: Viktor Kassai (Hungary)

6 June 2018 Friendly	Belgium	3–0	Egypt	Brussels, Belgium
20:45 UTC+2	Lukaku 27'; Hazard 38'; Fellaini 90+2'	Report		Stadium: King Baudouin Stadium; Attendance: 22,000; Referee: Anastasios Sidiropoulos (Greece)

11 June 2018 Friendly	Belgium	4–1	Costa Rica	Brussels, Belgium
20:45 UTC+2	Mertens 31'; Lukaku 42', 50'; Batshuayi 64'	Report	Ruiz 24'	Stadium: King Baudouin Stadium; Referee: Ovidiu Hațegan (Romania)

=== Belgium women's national football team ===
Belgium made their debut at the UEFA Women's Euro tournament in 2017, being eliminated in a group with Denmark and Netherlands, who would both go on to play the final. The team also played the first six of their eight qualification matches for the 2019 FIFA Women's World Cup, starting strongly with three wins.

==== UEFA Women's Euro 2017 ====
Pos	Team	Pld	W	D	L	GF	GA	GD	Pts	Qualification
1	Netherlands (H)	3	3	0	0	4	1	+3	9	Knockout stage
2	Denmark	3	2	0	1	2	1	+1	6	Knockout stage
3	Belgium	3	1	0	2	3	3	0	3	
4	Norway	3	0	0	3	0	4	−4	0	

Source: UEFA
Rules for classification: Group stage tiebreakers
(H) Hosts
16 July 2017
20:45

Denmark	1–0	Belgium
Troelsgaard 6'	Report

De Vijverberg, Doetinchem
Attendance: 5,054
Referee: Kateryna Monzul (Ukraine)
20 July 2017
18:00

Norway	0–2	Belgium
	Report	Van Gorp 59'; Cayman 67'

Rat Verlegh Stadion, Breda
Attendance: 8,477
Referee: Monika Mularczyk (Poland)
24 July 2017
20:45

Belgium	1–2	Netherlands
Wullaert 59'	Report	Spitse 27' (pen.); Martens 74'

Koning Willem II Stadion, Tilburg
Attendance: 12,697
Referee: Bibiana Steinhaus (Germany)

==== 2019 FIFA Women's World Cup qualification ====
19 September 2017	Belgium	12–0	Moldova	Den Dreef, Leuven
20:15	Cayman 3', 55', 60' (pen.), 70'; Wullaert 26', 29', 38'; Philtjens 35'; Deloose 62'; Vanmechelen 65'; De Caigny 69'; Colesnicenco 84' (o.g.)	Report		Attendance: 2,890; Referee: Eszter Urban (Hungary)

20 October 2017	Belgium	3–2	Romania	Den Dreef, Leuven
20:30	Cayman 30', 37'; Wullaert 87'	Report	Dușa 38'; Rus 53'	Attendance: 3,943; Referee: Marte Sørø (Norway)

24 October 2017	Portugal	0–1	Belgium	Estádio Municipal 25 de Abril, Penafiel
18:00		Report	De Caigny 47'	Attendance: 4,136; Referee: Anastasia Pustovoitova (Russia)

6 April 2018	Belgium	1–1	Portugal	Den Dreef, Leuven
19:30	De Caigny 90+1'	Report	Do. Silva 90+3' (pen.)	Attendance: 8,000; Referee: Esther Staubli (Switzerland)

10 April 2018	Italy	2–1	Belgium	Stadio Paolo Mazza, Ferrara
18:00	Rosucci 42'; Girelli 80'	Report	Cayman 37' (pen.)	Attendance: 7,500; Referee: Katalin Kulcsár (Hungary)

10 June 2018	Moldova	0–7	Belgium	Zimbru Stadium, Chișinău
18:00		Report	Cayman 45', 88'; Velde 49'; Zeler 65'; Biesmans 77'; Colesnicenco 80' (o.g.); Wullaert 83' (pen.)	Referee: Marina Višnjić (Serbia)

==== 2018 Cyprus Cup ====
28 February 2018	Belgium	1–2	Moldova	GSZ Stadium, Larnaca
13:00	De Caigny 76'	Report	Svitková 15'; Kožárová 27'

2 March 2018	Spain	0–0	Belgium	GSZ Stadium, Larnaca
18:00		Report		Referee: Florence Guillemin (French)

5 March 2018	Belgium	2–0	Austria	GSZ Stadium, Larnaca
18:00	Coryn 36'; Jaques 74'	Report

7 March 2018	South Africa	1–2	Belgium	GSZ Stadium, Larnaca
15:00	Matlou 18'	Report	Wullaert 33'; Van Den Abbeele 87'

==== Friendly ====
7 July 2017 Friendly	France	2–0	Belgium	Montpellier, France
21:00 (UTC+1)	Jaques 15' (o.g.); Catala 90+1'	Report		Stadium: Stade de la Mosson; Referee: Gyöngyi Gaál (Hungary)

11 July 2017 Friendly	Belgium	2–0	Russia	Denderleeuw, Belgium
15:00 (UTC+1)	Wullaert 16'; Cayman 45'	Report		Stadium: Van Roystadion; Referee: Vivian Peeters (Netherlands)

== Men's football ==
=== League season ===
==== Promotion and relegation ====
The following teams had achieved promotion or suffered relegation going into the 2017–18 season.

League	Promoted to league	Relegated from league
First Division A	Antwerp	Westerlo
First Division B	Beerschot Wilrijk	Lommel United
First Division Amateur Division	Eendracht Aalst; Berchem Sport; Châtelet; Knokke	Coxyde; Hasselt; Sprimont Comblain; WS Brussels
Second Division Amateur Division	City Pirates; Durbuy; Ingelmunster; Pepingen; Rebecq; Ronse; RWDM47; Sint-Lenaarts; Turnhout; Vosselaar	Charleroi Fleurus; Couvin-Mariembourg; Givry; Grimbergen; Halle; Menen; Namur; Woluwe-Zaventem
Third Division Amateur Division	Bilzen Waltwilder; Binche; Braine; Habay; Herentals; Heur-Tongeren; Hoeilaart; Kampenhout; Melsele; Spy; Stekene; Stockay; Termien; Ternesse; Visé; Wingene	Arlon; Berlare; Betekom; Helchteren; Racing Mechelen; Profondeville; Sint-Gillis Waas; Warnant; Zele

==== Belgian First Division A ====
===== Regular season =====
Pos	Team	Pld	W	D	L	GF	GA	GD	Pts	Qualification or relegation
1	Club Brugge	30	20	7	3	68	33	+35	67	Qualification for the championship play-offs
2	Anderlecht	30	16	7	7	49	42	+7	55	Qualification for the championship play-offs
3	Charleroi	30	13	12	5	46	30	+16	51	Qualification for the championship play-offs
4	Gent	30	14	8	8	45	27	+18	50	Qualification for the championship play-offs
5	Genk	30	11	11	8	44	36	+8	44	Qualification for the championship play-offs
6	Standard Liège	30	11	11	8	43	41	+2	44	Qualification for the championship play-offs
7	Kortrijk	30	12	6	12	42	39	+3	42	Qualification for the Europa League play-offs
8	Antwerp	30	10	11	9	38	40	−2	41	Qualification for the Europa League play-offs
9	Zulte Waregem	30	11	4	15	47	52	−5	37	Qualification for the Europa League play-offs
10	Sint-Truiden	30	9	10	11	29	41	−12	37	Qualification for the Europa League play-offs
11	Oostende	30	10	6	14	42	41	+1	36	Qualification for the Europa League play-offs
12	Waasland-Beveren	30	9	8	13	50	51	−1	35	Qualification for the Europa League play-offs
13	Lokeren	30	8	7	15	33	49	−16	31	Qualification for the Europa League play-offs
14	Excel Mouscron	30	8	6	16	40	59	−19	30	Qualification for the Europa League play-offs
15	Eupen	30	6	9	15	40	57	−17	27	Qualification for the Europa League play-offs
16	Mechelen (R)	30	6	9	15	31	49	−18	27	Relegation to First Division B

Source: Belgian First Division A (in Dutch), Soccerway
Rules for classification: 1) Points; 2) Matches won; 3) Goal difference; 4) Goals scored; 5) Away goals scored; 6) Away matches won; 7) Play-off.
(R) Relegated

==== Belgian First Amateur Division ====
Pos	Team	Pld	W	D	L	GF	GA	GD	Pts	Qualification or relegation
1	Lommel (Note: On 13 February a questionnaire revealed that only four clubs had requested a license to play in the Belgian First Division B: Deinze, Dessel, Lommel and Seraing.)	30	22	5	3	69	20	+49	71	Qualification for the promotion play-offs
2	Knokke	30	18	7	5	69	32	+37	61	Qualification for the promotion play-offs
3	Dessel (Note: On 13 February a questionnaire revealed that only four clubs had requested a license to play in the Belgian First Division B: Deinze, Dessel, Lommel and Seraing. Dessel eventually did not receive the license as their stadium was deemed insufficient, they are thus ineligible for promotion.)	30	18	6	6	53	29	+24	60	Qualification for the promotion play-offs
4	Deinze (Note: On 13 February a questionnaire revealed that only four clubs had requested a license to play in the Belgian First Division B: Deinze, Dessel, Lommel and Seraing. Deinze eventually withdrew their application for a license and are ineligible for promotion.)	30	15	5	10	44	30	+14	50	Qualification for the promotion play-offs
5	Seraing (Note: On 13 February a questionnaire revealed that only four clubs had requested a license to play in the Belgian First Division B: Deinze, Dessel, Lommel and Seraing.)	30	13	9	8	50	34	+16	48	
6	Heist	30	13	8	9	47	45	+2	47	
7	Oudenaarde	30	13	6	11	50	36	+14	45	
8	Aalst	30	13	5	12	48	46	+2	44	
9	ASV Geel	30	11	6	13	47	53	−6	39	
10	Virton (Note: Virton was initially refused a license for the First Amateur Division, but received it after appeal. Virton would have been relegated irrespective of their finishing position if their appeal had been denied, as they would then be placed in last place irrespective of the number of points obtained.)	30	11	4	15	40	45	−5	37	
11	Dender EH	30	9	9	12	39	52	−13	36	
12	Oosterzonen	30	9	7	14	39	47	−8	34	
13	Châtelet	30	6	11	13	34	53	−19	29	
14	Hamme (Note: Due to the bankruptcy of Lierse in the 2017–18 Belgian First Division B, one less team needed to relegate from the Belgian First Amateur Division, as a result, 13th placed Châtelet was saved and Hamme was not automatically relegated but rather given a chance to avoid relegation through the Promotion play-offs Final.) (R)	30	8	4	18	32	59	−27	28	Qualification for the Second Amateur Division Promotion play-offs Final
15	Berchem (R)	30	6	7	17	34	53	−19	25	Relegation to the Second Amateur Division
16	Patro Eisden Maasmechelen (Note: Patro Eisden Maasmechelen did not request a license for the First Amateur Division and would have been relegated irrespective of its finishing position.) (R)	30	3	5	22	18	79	−61	14	Relegation to the Second Amateur Division

Source: Belgian First Division A (in Dutch), Soccerway
Rules for classification: 1) Points; 2) Matches won; 3) Goal difference; 4) Goals scored; 5) Away goals scored; 6) Away matches won.
(R) Relegated

==== Belgian Second Amateur Division ====
===== Division A =====
Pos	Team	Pld	W	D	L	GF	GA	GD	Pts	Qualification or relegation
1	Rupel Boom (P)	30	19	4	7	74	49	+25	61	Promotion to the 2018–19 Belgian First Amateur Division
2	Mandel United	30	18	3	9	59	33	+26	57	Qualification for the Promotion play-offs VFV (Note: In theory four teams should take part in the Promotion play-offs VFV, namely the second placed team and the three period winners. Any vacant spots would be filled with the teams finishing highest in the league. However, besides Mandel United and Sint-Eloois-Winkel no other teams requested and received their licence to play in the Belgian First Amateur Division and hence two spots remain vacant.)
3	Sint-Eloois-Winkel	30	16	7	7	60	41	+19	55	Qualification for the Promotion play-offs VFV
4	Petegem	30	15	8	7	64	40	+24	53	
5	Westhoek	30	16	3	11	61	56	+5	51	
6	Sint-Niklaas	30	15	5	10	55	43	+12	50	
7	Temse	30	14	6	10	51	42	+9	48	
8	Harelbeke	30	12	7	11	45	42	+3	43	
9	Brakel	30	11	8	11	41	49	−8	41	
10	Gullegem	30	12	4	14	51	52	−1	40	
11	Gent-Zeehaven	30	12	1	17	47	59	−12	37	
12	Londerzeel	30	10	6	14	55	51	+4	36	
13	Ronse	30	7	12	11	33	44	−11	33	
14	Pepingen-Halle (R)	30	7	7	16	30	56	−26	28	Qualification for the relegation play-offs
15	Torhout (R)	30	7	5	18	36	67	−31	26	Relegation to the 2018–19 Belgian Third Amateur Division
16	Bornem (R)	30	5	2	23	28	66	−38	17	Relegation to the 2018–19 Belgian Third Amateur Division

Source: vbal4
Rules for classification: 1) Points; 2) Goal difference; 3) Goals scored.
(P) Promoted; (R) Relegated

===== Division B =====
Pos	Team	Pld	W	D	L	GF	GA	GD	Pts	Qualification or relegation
1	Tessenderlo (P)	30	20	5	5	63	30	+33	65	Promotion to the 2018–19 Belgian First Amateur Division
2	Bocholt	30	17	6	7	57	42	+15	57	
3	Spouwen-Mopertingen	30	14	10	6	56	46	+10	52	
4	City Pirates	30	13	8	9	52	44	+8	47	
5	Wijgmaal	30	14	4	12	53	49	+4	46	
6	Vosselaar	30	11	11	8	49	35	+14	44	
7	Hades	30	13	4	13	46	42	+4	43	
8	Overijse	30	12	5	13	39	51	−12	41	
9	Cappellen	30	11	8	11	43	37	+6	41	
10	Duffel	30	11	7	12	46	46	0	40	
11	Turnhout	30	8	13	9	30	34	−4	37	
12	Hoogstraten	30	10	6	14	39	47	−8	36	
13	Hasselt	30	10	5	15	34	45	−11	35	Qualification for the Promotion play-offs VFV (Note: In theory four teams should take part in the Promotion play-offs VFV, namely the second placed team and the three period winners. Any vacant spots would be filled with the teams finishing highest in the league. This would mean Bocholt, Spouwen-Mopertingen, City Pirates and Wijgmaal would normally take part, however as only Hasselt requested and received their licence to play in the Belgian First Amateur Division the three other spots remain vacant.)
14	Zwarte Leeuw (R)	30	6	12	12	43	47	−4	30	Qualification for the relegation play-offs
15	Tienen (R)	30	8	4	18	39	61	−22	28	Relegation to the 2018–19 Belgian Third Amateur Division
16	Sint-Lenaarts (R)	30	6	4	20	33	66	−33	22	Relegation to the 2018–19 Belgian Third Amateur Division

Source: vbal4
Rules for classification: 1) Points; 2) Goal difference; 3) Goals scored.
(P) Promoted; (R) Relegated

===== Division C =====
Pos	Team	Pld	W	D	L	GF	GA	GD	Pts	Qualification or relegation
1	RWDM (P)	28	25	1	2	84	19	+65	76	Promotion to the 2018–19 Belgian First Amateur Division
2	RFC Liège (P)	28	21	3	4	68	30	+38	66	Qualification for the Promotion play-offs ACFF (Note: In theory four teams should take part in the Promotion play-offs ACFF, namely the second placed team and the three period winners. Any vacant spots would be filled with the teams finishing highest in the league. This would mean FC Liège, Olympic Charleroi, Durbuy and Hamoir would normally take part, however the latter two teams have not requested (or received) their licence to play in the Belgian First Amateur Division. As only La Louvière Centre has received a licence from the other remaining teams, they will take part while the last spot remains vacant.)
3	Olympic Charleroi	28	16	6	6	53	37	+16	54	Qualification for the Promotion play-offs ACFF
4	Durbuy	28	13	6	9	40	37	+3	45	
5	Hamoir	28	13	5	10	44	43	+1	44	
6	La Louvière Centre	28	12	6	10	38	43	−5	42	Qualification for the Promotion play-offs ACFF
7	Walhain	28	9	10	9	38	44	−6	37	
8	Waremme	28	11	5	12	48	46	+2	38	
9	Acren-Lessines	28	9	7	12	44	46	−2	34	
10	Solières	28	9	8	11	37	41	−4	35	
11	Meux	28	8	7	13	48	55	−7	31	
12	Rebecq	28	8	7	13	41	51	−10	31	
13	Ciney (Note: Ciney might still be relegated depending on the result of the 2017–18 Belgian First Amateur Division. If the team participating in the Second Amateur Division Promotion play-offs Final is from the ACFF and relegates due to losing these play-offs, then in case the replacing team is from the VFV an extra team from the ACFF would be relegated, which would be Ciney based on their finishing position.)	28	5	9	14	35	48	−13	24	
14	Sprimont Comblain (R)	28	5	3	20	29	62	−33	18	Relegation to the 2018–19 Belgian Third Amateur Division
15	La Calamine (R)	28	3	3	22	25	70	−45	12	Relegation to the 2018–19 Belgian Third Amateur Division
16	WS Brussels (Note: WS Brussels was excluded from all competitions on 29 September 2017 and automatically placed in last position. If the club does not manage to pay its outstanding debts, its matricule will also be cancelled and the club will cease to exist.) (R)	0	0	0	0	0	0	0	0	Relegation to the 2018–19 Belgian Third Amateur Division

Source: vbal4
Rules for classification: 1) Points; 2) Goal difference; 3) Goals scored.
(P) Promoted; (R) Relegated

==== Belgian Third Amateur Division ====
===== Division A =====
Pos	Team	Pld	W	D	L	GF	GA	GD	Pts	Qualification or relegation
1	Menen (P)	30	19	5	6	66	35	+31	62	Promotion to the 2018–19 Belgian Second Amateur Division
2	Dikkelvenne (P)	30	18	4	8	71	36	+35	58	Qualification to Promotion play-offs VFV
3	Wingene	30	16	9	5	47	23	+24	57	Qualification to Promotion play-offs VFV
4	Eppegem (P)	30	16	7	7	60	42	+18	55	Qualification to Promotion play-offs VFV
5	Wetteren	30	14	8	8	46	38	+8	50	Qualification to Promotion play-offs VFV
6	Lebbeke	30	13	8	9	47	40	+7	47	
7	Melsele	30	12	7	11	52	44	+8	43	
8	Wervik	30	12	7	11	43	43	0	43	
9	Merelbeke	30	11	10	9	51	44	+7	43	
10	Wolvertem Merchtem	30	10	9	11	40	49	−9	39	
11	Lede	30	10	6	14	41	48	−7	36	
12	Stekene	30	9	8	13	43	51	−8	35	
13	Ninove (R)	30	8	8	14	45	57	−12	32	Qualification to relegation play-offs
14	Grimbergen (R)	30	7	5	18	34	62	−28	26	Relegation to the 2018–19 Belgian Provincial Leagues
15	Mariekerke (R)	30	6	8	16	38	55	−17	26	Relegation to the 2018–19 Belgian Provincial Leagues
16	Vlamertinge (R)	30	2	5	23	13	70	−57	11	Relegation to the 2018–19 Belgian Provincial Leagues

Source: https://www.vbal4.be/p010241z9.htm
(P) Promoted; (R) Relegated

===== Division B =====
Pos	Team	Pld	W	D	L	GF	GA	GD	Pts	Qualification or relegation
1	Heur-Tongeren (P)	30	17	4	9	59	37	+22	55	Promotion to the 2018–19 Belgian Second Amateur Division
2	Wellen	30	15	10	5	53	31	+22	55	Qualification to Promotion play-offs VFV
3	Termien	30	16	6	8	60	39	+21	54	Qualification to Promotion play-offs VFV
4	Diegem (P)	30	15	5	10	61	43	+18	50	Qualification to Promotion play-offs VFV
5	Leopoldsburg	30	14	6	10	54	39	+15	48	Qualification to Promotion play-offs VFV
6	Bilzen	30	14	6	10	60	54	+6	48	
7	Nijlen	30	13	6	11	54	55	−1	45	
8	Esperanza Pelt	30	13	5	12	54	50	+4	44	
9	Woluwe-Zaventem	30	11	8	11	55	51	+4	41	
10	Houtvenne	30	11	7	12	60	59	+1	40	
11	Kampenhout	30	10	8	12	41	49	−8	38	
12	Ternesse	30	9	7	14	54	69	−15	34	
13	Diest (R)	30	9	5	16	41	66	−25	32	Qualification to relegation play-offs
14	Hoeilaart (R)	30	8	6	16	39	68	−29	30	Relegation to the 2018–19 Belgian Provincial Leagues
15	Herentals (R)	30	7	6	17	38	59	−21	27	Relegation to the 2018–19 Belgian Provincial Leagues
16	Sterrebeek (R)	30	6	9	15	40	54	−14	27	Relegation to the 2018–19 Belgian Provincial Leagues

(P) Promoted; (R) Relegated

===== Division C =====
Pos	Team	Pld	W	D	L	GF	GA	GD	Pts	Qualification or relegation
1	La Louvière (P)	30	21	6	3	74	24	+50	69	Promotion to the 2018–19 Belgian Second Amateur Division
2	Francs Borains (P)	30	20	6	4	80	31	+49	66	Qualification to Promotion play-offs ACFF
3	Onhaye	30	18	2	10	66	47	+19	56	Qualification to Promotion play-offs ACFF
4	Tournai	30	16	7	7	45	27	+18	55	Qualification to Promotion play-offs ACFF
5	Couvin-Mariembourg (P)	30	16	6	8	61	43	+18	54	Qualification to Promotion play-offs ACFF
6	Binche	30	16	4	10	56	53	+3	52	
7	Wavre	30	15	7	8	58	47	+11	52	
8	Entité Manageoise	30	11	8	11	52	50	+2	41	
9	Albert Quevy-Mons	30	10	9	11	44	40	+4	39	
10	Jeunesse Tamines	30	10	7	13	46	56	−10	37	
11	Ganshoren	30	10	6	14	40	54	−14	36	
12	Léopold	30	9	5	16	47	50	−3	32	
13	Stade Brainois	30	8	5	17	35	52	−17	29	Qualification to relegation play-offs
14	Spy (R)	30	6	4	20	39	83	−44	22	Relegation to the 2018–19 Belgian Provincial Leagues
15	Solre (R)	30	4	8	18	35	67	−32	20	Relegation to the 2018–19 Belgian Provincial Leagues
16	Waterloo (R)	30	4	2	24	34	88	−54	14	Relegation to the 2018–19 Belgian Provincial Leagues

(P) Promoted; (R) Relegated

===== Division D =====
Pos	Team	Pld	W	D	L	GF	GA	GD	Pts	Qualification or relegation
1	Tilleur (P)	30	21	4	5	73	24	+49	67	Promotion to the 2018–19 Belgian Second Amateur Division
2	Visé (P)	30	19	7	4	83	32	+51	64	Qualification to Promotion play-offs ACFF
3	Stockay	30	17	7	6	59	33	+26	58	Qualification to Promotion play-offs ACFF
4	Aische	30	14	8	8	53	39	+14	50	Qualification to Promotion play-offs ACFF
5	Herstal	30	12	11	7	76	59	+17	47	Qualification to Promotion play-offs ACFF
6	Longlier	30	13	6	11	46	49	−3	45	
7	Aywaille	30	13	4	13	60	59	+1	43	
8	Givry	30	11	10	9	66	48	+18	43	
9	Richelle	30	11	9	10	58	42	+16	42	
10	Verlaine	30	10	10	10	51	45	+6	40	
11	Huy	30	10	9	11	51	52	−1	39	
12	Mormont	30	10	8	12	45	53	−8	38	
13	Bertrix	30	10	6	14	36	61	−25	36	Qualification to relegation play-offs
14	Habay (R)	30	8	6	16	41	54	−13	30	Relegation to the 2018–19 Belgian Provincial Leagues
15	Namur (Note: UR Namur has been sanctioned by the control commission of the Belgian FA for financial irregularities and outstanding debts to former players and staff. The team will face relegation and start the 2018–19 season with a penalty of 9 points. If they had achieved promotion during the 2017–18 season, the club would have remained in the Belgian Third Amateur Division, however as they relegated, they immediately dropped two levels, not one.) (R)	30	2	4	24	31	111	−80	10	Relegation to the 2018–19 Belgian Provincial Leagues
16	Cointe (R)	30	1	7	22	25	93	−68	10	Relegation to the 2018–19 Belgian Provincial Leagues

(P) Promoted; (R) Relegated

=== Cup competitions ===
Competition	Winner	Score	Runner-up
2017–18 Belgian Cup	Standard Liège	1–0	Genk
2017 Belgian Super Cup	Anderlecht	2–1	Zulte Waregem

== UEFA competitions ==
Champions Anderlecht qualified directly for the group stage of the Champions League, while runners-up Club Brugge started in the qualifying rounds. As cup winner, Zulte Waregem qualified directly for the group stage of the Europa League, while Gent and Oostende started in the qualifying rounds.

Overall, Belgian football clubs performed very poorly during the 2017–18 season, as both Club Brugge, Gent and Oostende failed to qualify for the group stages. Anderlecht only managed to win one match in the Champions League and although Zulte Waregem scored 7 points in their Europa League group they were also eliminated, causing all Belgian teams to be eliminated from European football before the winter break.

- Anderlecht was drawn in group B of the 2017–18 UEFA Champions League together with giants Paris Saint-Germain and Bayern Munich and looked to be battling it out with Celtic for the third place. Anderlecht lost the first 5 matches before winning 0–1 in Glasgow, but as they needed to overcome an earlier 0–3 home loss to become third, they were eliminated.
- Club Brugge first failed to qualify for the group stage of the 2017–18 UEFA Champions League after losing out to İstanbul Başakşehir before being eliminated by AEK Athens in the Play-off round.
- In the same manner as Anderlecht but in the Europa League rather than the Champions League, Zulte Waregem had also qualified directly for the group stage and failed to progress. Zulte Waregem also faced strong competition, being drawn against Lazio, Nice and Vitesse. Following 1–5 and 2–0 losses against Nice and Lazio respectively, they managed to obtain four points from their two duels with Vitesse. On the fifth matchday, an away loss to Nice meant elimination from the competition, but they finished the competition in style, with a 3–2 home win against Lazio.
- Gent, who reached the round of 16 of the 2016–17 UEFA Europa League, now immediately lost out to minnows Rheindorf Altach in the second qualifying round.
- Oostende entered European football for the first time in the history of the club. They were drawn against French giants Marseille and held them to a 0–0 draw at home. As they head earlier lost 4–2 in Marseille, they were also eliminated.

Date	Team	Competition	Round	Leg	Opponent	Location	Score	Belgian Team Goalscorers
26 July 2017	Club Brugge	Champions League	Qual. Round 3	Leg 1, Home	(Turkey) İstanbul Başakşehir	Jan Breydel Stadium, Bruges	3–3	Dennis, Denswil (2)
27 July 2017	Gent	Europa League	Qual. Round 3	Leg 1, Home	(Austria) Rheindorf Altach	Ghelamco Arena, Ghent	1–1	Coulibaly
27 July 2017	Oostende	Europa League	Qual. Round 3	Leg 1, Away	(France) Marseille	Stade Vélodrome, Marseille	4–2	Siani (p), Musona
2 August 2017	Club Brugge	Champions League	Qual. Round 3	Leg 2, Away	(Turkey) İstanbul Başakşehir	Başakşehir Fatih Terim Stadium, Istanbul	2–0	
3 August 2017	Gent	Europa League	Qual. Round 3	Leg 2, Away	(Austria) Rheindorf Altach	Tivoli-Neu, Innsbruck	3–1	Milićević (p)
3 August 2017	Oostende	Europa League	Qual. Round 3	Leg 2, Home	(France) Marseille	Versluys Arena, Ostend	0–0	
17 August 2017	Club Brugge	Europa League	Play-off round	Leg 1, Home	(Greece) AEK Athens	Jan Breydel Stadium, Bruges	0–0	
24 August 2017	Club Brugge	Europa League	Play-off round	Leg 2, Away	(Greece) AEK Athens	Olympic Stadium, Athens	3–0	
12 September 2017	Anderlecht	Champions League	Group Stage	Matchday 1, Away	(Germany) Bayern Munich	Allianz Arena, Munich	3–0	
14 September 2017	Zulte Waregem	Europa League	Group Stage	Matchday 1, Home	(France) Nice	Regenboogstadion, Waregem	1–5	Leya Iseka
27 September 2017	Anderlecht	Champions League	Group Stage	Matchday 2, Home	(Scotland) Celtic	Constant Vanden Stock Stadium, Anderlecht	0–3	
28 September 2017	Zulte Waregem	Europa League	Group Stage	Matchday 2, Away	(Italy) Lazio	Stadio Olimpico, Rome	2–0	
18 October 2017	Anderlecht	Champions League	Group Stage	Matchday 3, Home	(France) Paris Saint-Germain	Constant Vanden Stock Stadium, Anderlecht	0–4	
19 October 2017	Zulte Waregem	Europa League	Group Stage	Matchday 3, Home	(Netherlands) Vitesse	Regenboogstadion, Waregem	1–1	Kashia (o.g.)
31 October 2017	Anderlecht	Champions League	Group Stage	Matchday 4, Away	(France) Paris Saint-Germain	Parc des Princes, Paris	5–0	
2 November 2017	Zulte Waregem	Europa League	Group Stage	Matchday 4, Away	(Netherlands) Vitesse	GelreDome, Arnhem	0–2	Dabo (o.g.), Kaya
22 November 2017	Anderlecht	Champions League	Group Stage	Matchday 5, Home	(Germany) Bayern Munich	Constant Vanden Stock Stadium, Anderlecht	1–2	Hanni
23 November 2017	Zulte Waregem	Europa League	Group Stage	Matchday 5, Away	(France) Nice	Allianz Riviera, Nice	3–1	Hämäläinen
5 December 2017	Anderlecht	Champions League	Group Stage	Matchday 6, Away	(Scotland) Celtic	Celtic Park, Glasgow	0–1	Šimunović (o.g.)
7 December 2017	Zulte Waregem	Europa League	Group Stage	Matchday 6, Home	(Italy) Lazio	Regenboogstadion, Waregem	3–2	De Pauw, Heylen, Leya Iseka

1. Rheindorf Altach played their third qualifying round and play-off round home matches at Tivoli-Neu, Innsbruck, instead of their regular stadium Stadion Schnabelholz, Altach.

=== European qualification for 2018–19 summary ===
Competition	Qualifiers	Reason for Qualification
UEFA Champions League Group Stage	Club Brugge	1st in Belgian First Division A
UEFA Champions League Third Qualifying Round for Non-Champions	Standard Liège	2nd in Belgian First Division A
UEFA Europa League Group Stage	Anderlecht	3rd in Belgian First Division A
UEFA Europa League Third Qualifying Round	Gent	4th in Belgian First Division A
UEFA Europa League Second Qualifying Round	Genk	Europa League Playoff winner

== Managerial changes ==
This is a list of changes of managers within Belgian professional league football (Belgian First Division A and Belgian First Division B):

Team	Outgoing manager	Manner of departure	Date of vacancy	Position	Replaced by	Date of appointment
Waasland-Beveren	(North Macedonia) Čedomir Janevski	Mutual consent	End of 2016–17 season	Pre-season	(Belgium) Philippe Clement	24 May 2017
Club Brugge	(Belgium) Michel Preud'homme	Mutual consent	End of 2016–17 season	Pre-season	(Croatia) Ivan Leko	8 June 2017
Kortrijk	(France) Karim Belhocine	Replaced	End of 2016–17 season	Pre-season	(Greece) Yannis Anastasiou	20 May 2017 (Note: Anastasiou was announced as manager on 24 April 2017 but only replaced Karim Belhocine after the final match of the season.)
Standard Liège	(Belgium) José Jeunechamps (caretaker)	Caretaker replaced	End of 2016–17 season	Pre-season	(Portugal) Ricardo Sá Pinto	11 June 2017
Sint-Truiden	(Croatia) Ivan Leko	Signed by Club Brugge	8 June 2017	Pre-season	(Spain) Tintín Márquez	22 June 2017
Antwerp	(Belgium) Wim De Decker	Demoted to assistant coach	16 June 2017	Pre-season	(Romania) László Bölöni	16 June 2017
Westerlo	(Belgium) Jacky Mathijssen	Mutual consent	21 June 2017	Pre-season	(Bosnia and Herzegovina) Vedran Pelić	21 June 2017
Sint-Truiden	(Spain) Tintín Márquez	Sacked	7 August 2017	8th	(Belgium) Jonas De Roeck	10 August 2017
Lokeren	(Iceland) Rúnar Kristinsson	Sacked	9 August 2017	15th	(Belgium) Peter Maes	9 August 2017
Roeselare	(France) Arnauld Mercier	Sacked	12 September 2017	5th	(Netherlands) Dennis van Wijk	28 September 2017
Anderlecht	(Switzerland) René Weiler	Sacked	18 September 2017	9th	(Argentina) Nicolás Frutos (caretaker)	18 September 2017
Oostende	(Belgium) Yves Vanderhaeghe	Sacked	19 September 2017	16th	(Bosnia and Herzegovina) Adnan Čustović	19 September 2017
OH Leuven	(Netherlands) Dennis van Wijk	Replaced	22 September 2017	4th	(England) Nigel Pearson	22 September 2017
Gent	(Belgium) Hein Vanhaezebrouck	Mutual consent	27 September 2017	14th	(Belgium) Yves Vanderhaeghe	4 October 2017
Anderlecht	(Argentina) Nicolás Frutos	Caretaker replaced	3 October 2017	7th	(Belgium) Hein Vanhaezebrouck	3 October 2017
Lierse	(Belgium) Frederik Vanderbiest	Sacked	6 October 2017	7th	(Belgium) William Still	11 October 2017
Cercle Brugge	(Belgium) José Riga	Sacked	16 October 2017	3rd	(Belgium) Franky Vercauteren	16 October 2017
Mechelen	(Belgium) Yannick Ferrera	Sacked	23 October 2017	15th	(Belgium) Tom Caluwé (caretaker)	23 October 2017
Mechelen	(Belgium) Tom Caluwé (caretaker)	Caretaker replaced	1 November 2017	16th	(Serbia) Aleksandar Janković	1 November 2017
Eupen	(Spain) Jordi Condom	Sacked	6 November 2017	16th	(France) Claude Makélélé	6 November 2017
Kortrijk	(Greece) Yannis Anastasiou	Sacked	8 November 2017	15th	(Belgium) Glen De Boeck	8 November 2017
Tubize	(Senegal) Sadio Demba	Sacked	13 November 2017	Closing tournament: 6th Overall: 8th	(France) Philippe Thys	13 November 2017
Lierse	(Belgium) William Still	Did not possess correct UEFA diploma to remain manager	2 December 2017	Closing tournament: 1st Overall: 3rd	(Belgium) David Colpaert	2 December 2017
Westerlo	(Bosnia and Herzegovina) Vedran Pelić	Replaced	5 December 2017	Closing tournament: 8th Overall: 7th	(Belgium) Bob Peeters	5 December 2017
Genk	(Netherlands) Albert Stuivenberg	Sacked	10 December 2017	9th	(Belgium) Philippe Clement	19 December 2017
Waasland-Beveren	(Belgium) Philippe Clement	Signed for Genk	19 December 2017	7th	(Belgium) Sven Vermant	5 January 2018
Roeselare	(Netherlands) Dennis van Wijk	Sacked	19 January 2018	Closing tournament: 7th Overall: 5th	(Spain) Jordi Condom	25 January 2018
Mechelen	(Serbia) Aleksandar Janković	Sacked	24 January 2018	15th	(Netherlands) Dennis van Wijk	24 January 2018
Excel Mouscron	(Romania) Mircea Rednic	Sacked	14 February 2018	12th	(Belgium) Frank Defays	14 February 2018
Waasland-Beveren	(Belgium) Sven Vermant	Sacked	9 May 2018	Regular season: 12th Europa League POs: 6th	(Belgium) Dirk Geeraerd (caretaker)	9 May 2018

== See also ==
- 2017–18 Belgian First Division A
- 2017–18 Belgian First Division B
- 2017–18 Belgian First Amateur Division
- 2017–18 Belgian Second Amateur Division
- 2017–18 Belgian Third Amateur Division
- 2017–18 Belgian Cup
- 2017 Belgian Super Cup
