= 2017 in Danish football =

Football in Denmark
- Season: 2017

Men's football
- Superligaen: F.C. Copenhagen

Women's football
- Danish Women's League: Brøndby IF

== National teams ==
=== Denmark women's national football team ===
==== UEFA Women's Euro 2017 ====
===== Group stage =====
Pos	Team	Pld	W	D	L	GF	GA	GD	Pts	Qualification
1	Netherlands (H)	3	3	0	0	4	1	+3	9	Knockout stage
2	Denmark	3	2	0	1	2	1	+1	6	Knockout stage
3	Belgium	3	1	0	2	3	3	0	3	
4	Norway	3	0	0	3	0	4	−4	0	

Source: UEFA
Rules for classification: Group stage tiebreakers
(H) Hosts

Win Draw Loss

16 July 2017 Group A	Denmark	1–0	Belgium	Doetinchem, Netherlands
	Troelsgaard 6'	Report		Stadium: De Vijverberg; Attendance: 4.565; Referee: Kateryna Monzul (Ukraine)

20 July 2017 Group A	Netherlands	1–0	Denmark	Rotterdam, Netherlands
	Spitse 20' (pen.)	Report		Stadium: Sparta Stadion Het Kasteel; Attendance: 10.078; Referee: Riem Hussein (Germany)

24 July 2017 Group A	Norway	0–1	Denmark	Deventer, Netherlands
		Report	Veje 5'	Stadium: De Adelaarshorst; Attendance: 5.885; Referee: Stéphanie Frappart (France)

===== Knockout stage =====
30 July 2017 Quarter-final	Germany	1–2	Denmark	Rotterdam, Netherlands
	Kerschowski 5'	Report	Nadim 48'; Nielsen 83'	Stadium: Sparta Stadion Het Kasteel; Attendance: 5.251; Referee: Katalin Kulcsár (Hungary)

3 August 2017 Semi-final	Denmark	0–0 (3–0 p)	Austria	Breda, Netherlands
		Report		Stadium: Rat Verlegh Stadion; Attendance: 10.184; Referee: Kateryna Monzul (Ukraine)
	Penalties
	Nadim (penalty scored); Harder (penalty scored); Junge (penalty missed); Boye (penalty scored)		(penalty missed) Feiersinger; (penalty missed) Pinther; (penalty missed) Aschauer

6 August 2017 Final	Netherlands	4–2	Denmark	Enschede, Netherlands
	Miedema 10', 89'; Martens 27'; Spitse 51'		Nadim 6' (pen.); Harder 33'	Stadium: De Grolsch Veste; Attendance: 28.182; Referee: Esther Staubli (Switzerland)

==== 2019 FIFA Women's World Cup qualification ====
Pos	Team	Pld	W	D	L	GF	GA	GD	Pts	Qualification
1	Sweden	8	7	0	1	22	2	+20	21	2019 FIFA Women's World Cup
2	Denmark	8	5	1	2	22	8	+14	16	Play-offs
3	Ukraine	8	4	1	3	9	10	−1	13	
4	Hungary	8	1	1	6	8	26	−18	4	
5	Croatia	8	0	3	5	5	20	−15	3	

Source: UEFA
Rules for classification: Qualification tiebreakers

Win Draw Loss

19 September 2017 2019 WCQ	Hungary	1–6	Denmark	Győr, Hungary
	Jakabfi 41' (pen.)	Report	Nadim 28' (pen.); Troelsgaard 44', 67', 74'; Harder 55'; Sørensen 88'	Stadium: Gyirmóti Stadion; Referee: Ewa Augustyn (Poland)

Not played (Note: The Sweden v Denmark match was scheduled for 20 October 2017, 18:15 local time, at the Gamla Ullevi, Gothenburg, but was cancelled by Denmark because of a pay dispute between the Danish team and their federation. UEFA opened disciplinary proceedings against Denmark for refusal to play and, on 16 November, it was announced that UEFA awarded the match to Sweden by a score of 3–0, and fined Denmark €20,000.) 2019 WCQ	Sweden	3–0 (awarded)	Denmark

24 October 2017 2019 WCQ	Croatia	0–4	Denmark	Zagreb, Croatia
		Report	Harder 7', 27'; Christiansen 89'; Bruun 90+4'	Stadium: Stadion ŠRC Zaprešić; Attendance: 400; Referee: Lorraine Clark (Scotland)

==== 2017 Algarve Cup ====
===== Group stage =====
Pos	Team	Pld	W	D	L	GF	GA	GD	Pts
1	Canada	3	2	0	1	5	4	+1	6
2	Denmark	3	1	1	1	1	1	0	4
3	Russia	3	2	0	1	4	3	+1	6
4	Portugal	3	0	1	2	1	3	−2	1

Updated to match(es) played on 6 March 2017. Source: Federação Portuguesa de Futebol (in Portuguese)
Rules for classification: Goal difference

Win Draw Loss

1 March 2017 2017 Algarve Cup	Denmark	0–1	Canada	Lagos, Portugal
		Report	Sinclair 90'	Stadium: Lagos Municipal Stadium; Attendance: 477

3 March 2017 2017 Algarve Cup	Portugal	0–6	Denmark	Parchal, Portugal
		Report	Larsen 11', 32'; Jensen 9'; Troelsgaard 25', 68'; Veje 59'	Stadium: Bela Vista Municipal Stadium; Attendance: 362; Referee: Yoshimi Yamashita (Japan)

6 March 2017 2017 Algarve Cup	Russia	1–6	Denmark	Vila Real de Santo António, Portugal
	Chernomyrdina 45+3'	Report	Harder 25' (pen.), 59', 72'; Sørensen 70'; Dyrehauge Hansen 82', 89'	Stadium: VRS António Sports Complex; Attendance: 162; Referee: Casey Reibelt (Australia)

===== Ranking of 3rd placed teams =====
Pos	Grp	Team	Pld	W	D	L	GF	GA	GD	Pts	Qualification
1	A	Denmark	3	2	0	1	12	2	+10	6	Third-place match
2	B	Japan	3	2	0	1	5	2	+3	6	Fifth-place match
3	C	Netherlands	3	2	0	1	4	3	+1	6	Fifth-place match

===== 3rd place match =====
8 March 2017 2017 Algarve Cup	Australia	1–1 (1–4 p)	Denmark	Albufeira, Portugal
	K. Simon 36'	Report	Harder 80'	Stadium: Albufeira Municipal Stadium; Attendance: 200
	Penalties
	Kellond-Knight (penalty scored); Polkinghorne (penalty missed); Kerr (penalty missed)		(penalty scored) Røddik Hansen; (penalty scored) Petersen; (penalty scored) Larsen; (penalty scored) Troelsgaard

==== Friendlies ====
Win Draw Loss

20 January 2017 Friendly	Denmark	2–2	Scotland	Larnaca, Cyprus
	Harder 6'; Rasmussen 31'	Report	Ross 21'; Cuthbert 71'	Stadium: GSZ Stadium; Attendance: 42; Referee: Neofytos Neofytou (Cyprus)

23 January 2017 Friendly	Scotland	1–1	Denmark	Paralimni, Cyprus
	Brown 4' (o.g.)	Report	Little 75'	Stadium: Paralimni "Tasos Markou" Stadium; Attendance: 20; Referee: Leontios Trattou (Cyprus)

11 April 2017 Friendly	Denmark	5–0	Finland	Slagelse, Denmark
	Harder 6'; Troelsgaard 20'; Auvinen 39' (o.g.); Larsen 42', 59'	Report		Stadium: Harboe Arena Slagelse; Attendance: 3.312; Referee: Henrikke Nervik (Norway)

1 July 2017 Friendly	Denmark	1–2	England	Gladsaxe, Denmark
	Harder 66'	Report	White 44', 76'	Stadium: Gladsaxe Stadium; Attendance: 2.934; Referee: Sara Persson (Sweden)

6 July 2017 Friendly	Austria	4–2	Denmark	Wiener Neustadt, Austria
	Billa 1', 49'; Zadrazil 55', 63'	Report	Veje 22'; Larsen 88'	Stadium: Wiener Neustadt Stadium; Attendance: 1.250; Referee: Lucie Sulcova (Czech Republic)

==== Total results summary ====
Overall								Home						Away					
Pld	W	D	L	GF	GA	GD	Pts	W	D	L	GF	GA	GD	W	D	L	GF	GA	GD
17	8	4	5	40	19	+21	28	2	2	2	9	5	+4	6	2	3	31	14	+17

Last updated: 24 February 2018.
Source: DBU (in Danish)

== Domestic results ==
=== Women's football ===
==== 2016–17 Elitedivisionen ====
===== Main round =====
Pos	Team	Pld	W	D	L	GF	GA	GD	Pts	Qualification
1	Brøndby	14	13	1	0	56	5	+51	40	Championship Round
2	Fortuna Hjørring	14	12	1	1	52	13	+39	37	Championship Round
3	KoldingQ	14	8	0	6	23	17	+6	24	Championship Round
4	Skovbakken	14	7	2	5	23	20	+3	23	Championship Round
5	Ballerup-Skovlunde Fodbold	14	4	2	8	15	28	−13	14	Championship Round
6	Vejle Boldklub	14	3	3	8	7	29	−22	12	Championship Round
7	Odense Q	14	3	2	9	20	27	−7	11	Relegation Round
8	Varde IF	14	0	1	13	9	66	−57	1	Relegation Round

Source: dbu.dk
Rules for classification: 1) Points; 2) Goal difference; 3) Number of goals scored; 4) Head-to-head points; 5) Head-to-head goal difference; 6) Head-to-head away goals scored

===== Championship round =====
Pos	Team	Pld	W	D	L	GF	GA	GD	Pts	Qualification or relegation
1	Brøndby (C)	9	8	1	0	34	3	+31	35	Qualification to Champions League
2	Fortuna Hjørring (Q)	9	7	2	0	22	3	+19	31	Qualification to Champions League
3	Skovbakken	9	3	1	5	10	18	−8	14	
4	KoldingQ	9	2	1	6	8	23	−15	13	
5	Ballerup-Skovlunde Fodbold	9	2	0	7	8	21	−13	8	
6	Vejle	9	1	3	5	5	19	−14	6	

Updated to match(es) played on 10 June 2016. Source: soccerway.com
Rules for classification: 1) Points; 2) Goal difference; 3) Number of goals scored
(C) Champions; (Q) Qualified for the phase indicated
