= Belgium at the UEFA Women's Championship =

Belgium have participated 3 times at the UEFA Women's Championship: Their best achievement is reaching the UEFA Women's Championships quarter final in (2022).

== UEFA Women's Championship record ==
UEFA Women's Championship record									Qualification record							
Year	Round	Position	Pld	W	D	L	GF	GA	Pld	W	D	L	GF	GA	P/R	Rnk
(Denmark) (England) (Italy) (Sweden) 1984	Did not qualify								6	1	3	2	7	12		
(Norway) 1987	Did not qualify								6	1	0	5	6	17		
(West Germany) 1989	Did not qualify								8	2	4	2	7	4		
(Denmark) 1991	Did not qualify								6	1	0	5	1	12		
(Italy) 1993	Did not qualify								4	1	2	1	1	8		
(England) (Germany) (Norway) (Sweden) 1995	Did not qualify								6	2	1	3	15	13		
(Norway) (Sweden) 1997	Did not qualify								Belgium and 17 other nations were not part of a proper qualification group							
(Germany) 2001	Did not qualify								Belgium and 16 other nations were not part of a proper qualification group							
(England) 2005	Did not qualify								8	1	0	7	5	39		
(Finland) 2009	Did not qualify								8	3	1	4	7	15		
(Sweden) 2013	Did not qualify								10	6	2	2	18	8		
(Netherlands) 2017	Group stage	10th	3	1	0	2	3	3	8	5	2	1	27	5		
(England) 2022	Quarter-finals	8th	4	1	1	2	3	4	8	7	0	1	37	5		
(Switzerland) 2025	Group stage	11th	3	1	0	2	4	8	10	4	2	4	14	19	(Note: From Euro 2025 onwards a new qualifying format was introduced, linked to the Women's Nations League where teams are divided into leagues with promotion/relegation between the leagues at the end of each cycle.)	12th
(Germany) 2029																
Total	Quarter-finals	3/14	10	3	1	6	10	15	88	34	17	37	145	157	12th	
* Draws include knockout matches decided on penalty kicks.

== Euro 2017 ==
=== Group A ===
Pos	Team	Pld	W	D	L	GF	GA	GD	Pts	Qualification
1	Netherlands (H)	3	3	0	0	4	1	+3	9	Knockout stage
2	Denmark	3	2	0	1	2	1	+1	6	Knockout stage
3	Belgium	3	1	0	2	3	3	0	3	
4	Norway	3	0	0	3	0	4	−4	0	

Source: UEFA
Rules for classification: Group stage tiebreakers
(H) Hosts
16 July 2017
20:45

Denmark	1–0	Belgium
Troelsgaard 6'	Report

De Vijverberg, Doetinchem
Attendance: 5,054
Referee: Kateryna Monzul (Ukraine)

20 July 2017
18:00

Norway	0–2	Belgium
	Report	Van Gorp 59'; Cayman 67'

Rat Verlegh Stadion, Breda
Attendance: 8,477
Referee: Monika Mularczyk (Poland)

24 July 2017
20:45

Belgium	1–2	Netherlands
Wullaert 59'	Report	Spitse 27' (pen.); Martens 74'

Koning Willem II Stadion, Tilburg
Attendance: 12,697
Referee: Bibiana Steinhaus (Germany)

== Euro 2022 ==
=== Group A ===
Pos	Team	Pld	W	D	L	GF	GA	GD	Pts	Qualification
1	France	3	2	1	0	8	3	+5	7	Advance to knockout stage
2	Belgium	3	1	1	1	3	3	0	4	Advance to knockout stage
3	Iceland	3	0	3	0	3	3	0	3	
4	Italy	3	0	1	2	2	7	−5	1	

Source: UEFA
10 July 2022
17:00

Belgium	1–1	Iceland
Vanhaevermaet 67' (pen.)	Report	Þorvaldsdóttir 50'

Academy Stadium, Manchester
Attendance: 3,859
Referee: Tess Olofsson (Sweden)

14 July 2022
20:00

France	2–1	Belgium
Diani 6'; Mbock Bathy 41'	Report	Cayman 36'

New York Stadium, Rotherham
Attendance: 8,173
Referee: Cheryl Foster (Wales)

18 July 2022
20:00

Italy	0–1	Belgium
	Report	De Caigny 49'

Academy Stadium, Manchester
Attendance: 3,919
Referee: Ivana Martinčić (Croatia)

=== Quarter-finals ===
22 July 2022
20:00

Sweden	1–0	Belgium
Sembrant 90+2'	Report

Leigh Sports Village, Leigh
Attendance: 7,517
Referee: Kateryna Monzul (Ukraine)

== Head-to-head record ==
Opponent	Pld	W	D	L	GF	GA	GD	Win %
Denmark	1	0	0	1	0	1	−1	0.00
France	1	0	0	1	1	2	−1	0.00
Iceland	1	0	1	0	1	1	+0	0.00
Italy	2	1	0	1	1	1	+0	50.00
Netherlands	1	0	0	1	1	2	−1	0.00
Norway	1	1	0	0	2	0	+2	100.00
Portugal	1	1	0	0	2	1	+1	100.00
Spain	1	0	0	1	2	6	−4	0.00
Sweden	1	0	0	1	0	1	−1	0.00
Total	10	3	1	6	10	15	−5	30.00
