= UEFA Women's Euro 2017 qualifying Group 7 =

Football tournament qualification stage

Group 7 of the UEFA Women's Euro 2017 qualifying competition consisted of five teams: England, Belgium, Serbia, Bosnia and Herzegovina, and Estonia. The composition of the eight groups in the qualifying group stage was decided by the draw held on 20 April 2015.

The group was played in home-and-away round-robin format. The group winners qualified directly for the final tournament, while the runners-up also qualified directly if they were one of the six best runners-up among all eight groups (not counting results against the fifth-placed team); otherwise, the runners-up advance to the play-offs.

== Standings ==
Pos	Team	Pld	W	D	L	GF	GA	GD	Pts	Qualification	England	Belgium	Serbia	Bosnia and Herzegovina	Estonia
1	England	8	7	1	0	32	1	+31	22	Final tournament	—	1–1	7–0	1–0	5–0
2	Belgium	8	5	2	1	27	5	+22	17	Final tournament	0–2	—	1–1	6–0	6–0
3	Serbia	8	3	1	4	10	21	−11	10		0–7	1–3	—	0–1	3–0
4	Bosnia and Herzegovina	8	3	0	5	8	17	−9	9		0–1	0–5	2–4	—	4–0
5	Estonia	8	0	0	8	0	33	−33	0		0–8	0–5	0–1	0–1	—

Source: UEFA
Rules for classification: Qualification tiebreakers

== Matches ==
Times are CEST (UTC+2) for dates between 29 March and 24 October 2015 and between 27 March and 29 October 2016, for other dates times are CET (UTC+1).

17 September 2015
18:00

Estonia	0–1	Serbia
	Report	Mijatović 43'

Tamme Stadium, Tartu
Attendance: 647
Referee: Elia Martinez (Spain)

21 September 2015
18:00

Estonia	0–8	England
	Report	Carter 2', 83', 90+2'; Potter 34'; Kirby 40', 81'; J. Scott 53'; Christiansen 74'

A. Le Coq Arena, Tallinn
Attendance: 1,342
Referee: Dilan Deniz Gökçek (Turkey)

22 September 2015
20:30

Belgium	6–0	Bosnia and Herzegovina
Dijaković 7' (o.g.); De Gernier 20'; Zeler 33', 41' (pen.); Cayman 35'; Coutereels 72' (pen.)	Report

Den Dreef, Leuven
Attendance: 2,620
Referee: Kateryna Zora (Ukraine)

23 October 2015
15:00

Bosnia and Herzegovina	4–0	Estonia
Nikolić 6', 36', 43'; Radeljić 73'	Report

Bosnia and Herzegovina FA Training Centre, Zenica
Attendance: 270
Referee: Tania Fernandes Morais (Luxembourg)

27 October 2015
13:30

Serbia	3–0	Estonia
Čubrilo 17', 61'; Radojičić 82'	Report

Suvača Sportcenter, Pećinci
Attendance: 100
Referee: Justina Lavrenovaite (Lithuania)
27 October 2015
14:00

Bosnia and Herzegovina	0–5	Belgium
	Report	Biesmans 25', 65'; Wullaert 73', 83'; Demoustier 90+2'

Bosnia and Herzegovina FA Training Centre, Zenica
Attendance: 407
Referee: Lorraine Clark (Scotland)

25 November 2015
13:00

Serbia	0–1	Bosnia and Herzegovina
	Report	Nikolić 88'

Sports Center of FA of Serbia, Stara Pazova
Attendance: 250
Referee: Galiya Echeva (Bulgaria)

29 November 2015
16:30

England	1–0	Bosnia and Herzegovina
J. Scott 69'	Report

Ashton Gate Stadium, Bristol
Attendance: 13,040
Referee: Florence Guillemin (France)

30 November 2015
20:00

Belgium	1–1	Serbia
Yuceil 17'	Report	Damnjanović 39'

Den Dreef, Leuven
Attendance: 3,650
Referee: Marija Kurtes (Germany)

8 April 2016
20:55

England	1–1	Belgium
J. Scott 84'	Report	Cayman 18'

New York Stadium, Rotherham
Attendance: 10,550
Referee: Gyöngyi Gaál (Hungary)

12 April 2016
16:00

Bosnia and Herzegovina	0–1	England
	Report	Carney 86'

Bosnia and Herzegovina FA Training Centre, Zenica
Attendance: 1,500
Referee: Simona Ghisletta (Switzerland)
12 April 2016
20:00

Belgium	6–0	Estonia
Coutereels 11'; De Caigny 21', 50'; Wullaert 30', 63'; Schryvers 67'	Report

Den Dreef, Leuven
Attendance: 2,084
Referee: Melis Özçiğdem (Turkey)

3 June 2016
18:00

Estonia	0–5	Belgium
	Report	Zlidnis 10' (o.g.); Zeler 38'; Van Gorp 60'; Cayman 65', 70'

Tamme Stadium, Tartu
Attendance: 322
Referee: Barbara Poxhofer (Austria)

4 June 2016
18:30

England	7–0	Serbia
Greenwood 16'; Carney 34' (pen.), 60', 64'; Daly 43'; White 51'; Christiansen 52'	Report

Adams Park, Wycombe
Attendance: 5,903
Referee: Lina Lehtovaara (Finland)

6 June 2016
18:00

Estonia	0–1	Bosnia and Herzegovina
	Report	Nikolić 57'

Tamme Stadium, Tartu
Attendance: 287
Referee: Cristina Bujor (Romania)

7 June 2016
17:00

Serbia	0–7	England
	Report	J. Scott 13'; White 28'; Davison 41', 46'; Damjanović 53' (o.g.); Parris 69', 90'

Sports Center of FA of Serbia, Stara Pazova
Attendance: 120
Referee: Stéphanie Frappart (France)

15 September 2016
16:00

Serbia	1–3	Belgium
Tenkov 31'	Report	De Caigny 13'; Deloose 52'; Van Gorp 74'

Sports Center of FA of Serbia, Stara Pazova
Attendance: 200
Referee: Efthalia Mitsi (Greece)
15 September 2016
20:05

England	5–0	Estonia
Carter 9', 17', 56'; J. Scott 13'; Carney 90+4'	Report

Meadow Lane, Nottingham
Attendance: 7,052
Referee: Vera Opeykina (Russia)

20 September 2016
16:00

Bosnia and Herzegovina	2–4	Serbia
Medić 40'; Nikolić 84' (pen.)	Report	Slović 9'; Tenkov 48', 69'; Čubrilo 54'

Bosnia and Herzegovina FA Training Centre, Zenica
Attendance: 420
Referee: Angelika Soeder (Germany)
20 September 2016
19:00

Belgium	0–2	England
	Report	Parris 65'; Carney 85'

Den Dreef, Leuven
Attendance: 6,754
Referee: Pernilla Larsson (Sweden)

== Goalscorers ==
6 goals

- (Bosnia and Herzegovina) Milena Nikolić
- (England) Karen Carney
- (England) Danielle Carter

5 goals

- (England) Jill Scott

4 goals

- (Belgium) Janice Cayman
- (Belgium) Tessa Wullaert

3 goals

- (Belgium) Tine De Caigny
- (Belgium) Aline Zeler
- (England) Nikita Parris
- (Serbia) Jelena Čubrilo
- (Serbia) Mirela Tenkov

2 goals

- (Belgium) Julie Biesmans
- (Belgium) Maud Coutereels
- (Belgium) Elke Van Gorp
- (England) Izzy Christiansen
- (England) Gemma Davison
- (England) Fran Kirby
- (England) Ellen White

1 goal

- (Belgium) Cécile De Gernier
- (Belgium) Laura Deloose
- (Belgium) Audrey Demoustier
- (Belgium) Tine Schryvers
- (Belgium) Sara Yuceil
- (Bosnia and Herzegovina) Merjema Medić
- (Bosnia and Herzegovina) Antonela Radeljić
- (England) Rachel Daly
- (England) Alex Greenwood
- (England) Jo Potter
- (Serbia) Jovana Damnjanović
- (Serbia) Milica Mijatović
- (Serbia) Marija Radojičić
- (Serbia) Violeta Slović

1 own goal

- (Bosnia and Herzegovina) Nikolina Dijaković (playing against Belgium)
- (Estonia) Inna Zlidnis (playing against Belgium)
- (Serbia) Nevena Damjanović (playing against England)
