= Martin Sjögren =

Swedish football coach

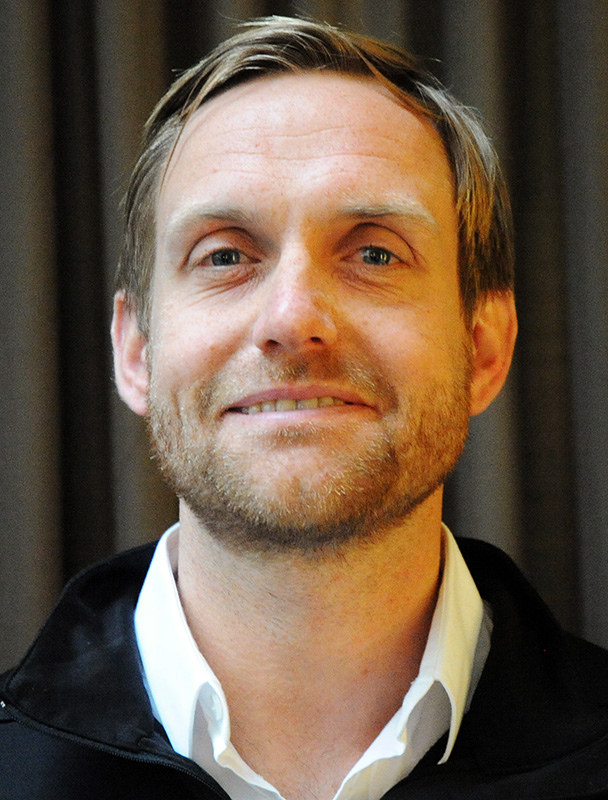
- Sjögren in 2014

Personal information
- Date of birth: 27 April 1977 (age 49)
- Place of birth: Gimo, Sweden
- Position: Midfielder

Youth career
- Gimo IF

College career
Years	Team	Apps	(Gls)
2000–2001	University of North Florida	26	(5)

Senior career*
Years	Team	Apps	(Gls)
- IS Halmia
- IFK Värnamo
- Växjö BK

Managerial career
- 2004–2005: Östers IF Dam
- 2006–2009: LdB FC Malmö (Assistant)
- 2010–2011: LdB FC Malmö
- 2012–2016: Linköping FC
- 2016–2022: Norway women
- 2023–2024: IFK Norrköping (men) (assistant)
- 2024–2025: Hammarby IF women
- 2026: Chicago Stars
- * Club domestic league appearances and goals

Martin Sjögren (born 27 April 1977) is a Swedish football coach.

== Managerial Career ==
=== Damallsvenskan ===
Sjögren won the 2016 Damallsvenskan title with Linköpings FC.

=== Norway national team ===
Sjögren agreed to take the Norway national team job in 2016. Upon taking the job, he declared his ambitions to lead Norway to Olympic qualification.

Norway failed to progress past the group stage in the UEFA Women's Euro 2017, finishing last in Group A without scoring a goal.

He led Norway to the quarterfinals of the 2019 FIFA Women's World Cup, finishing second in Group A during the group stages before being defeated 3–0 by England in the quarterfinals.

The team failed to qualify for the 2020 Summer Olympics.

In 2021, he signed a new contract with the Norway national team, with included provisions for a performance review after the 2022 Euros. However, he resigned as Norwegian coach following the UEFA Women's Euro 2022, where Norway failed to progress past the group stage for a second consecutive tournament and suffered an 8–0 loss to England, one of the largest in the tournament's history.

=== Chicago Stars FC ===
On August 13, 2025, Chicago Stars FC announced that they had hired Sjögren as the club's next head coach; he would join the club prior to the 2026 season.
