= Ingrid Marie Spord =

Norwegian footballer (born 1994)

Personal information
- Full name: Ingrid Marie Karlsen Spord
- Date of birth: 12 July 1994 (age 32)
- Place of birth: Norway
- Position: Midfielder

Team information
- Current team: Sandviken
- Number: 10

Senior career*
Years	Team	Apps	(Gls)
2013–2016	Sandviken	76	(7)
2016–2017	Lillestrøm	30	(2)
2017–2018	Fiorentina	6	(1)
2018–	Sandviken	54	(1)

International career
2017–	Norway	18	(0)
- * Club domestic league appearances and goals as of 16 December 2017

Ingrid Marie Spord (born 12 July 1994) is a Norwegian footballer who plays for Sandviken in the Norwegian Toppserien League and the Norway national team.

She played for Norway at UEFA Women's Euro 2017.
