= Ingrid Schjelderup (footballer) =

Norwegian footballer (born 1987)

Personal information
- Date of birth: 21 December 1987 (age 38)
- Place of birth: Oslo, Norway
- Height: 1.67 m (5 ft 6 in)
- Position: Midfielder

Youth career
- 2002: Holmlia SK

Senior career*
| Years | Team | Apps | (Gls) |
| 2002–2009 | Kolbotn | 87 | (10) |
| 2010–2012 | Linköpings FC | 21 | (3) |
| 2013 | Vålerenga | 22 | (4) |
| 2014–2015 | Stabæk | 39 | (6) |
| 2016–2017 | Eskilstuna | 37 | (2) |
| 2017 | Fiorentina | 2 | (0) |
| 2018–2019 | Vålerenga | 25 | (5) |

International career^{‡}
| 2009–2017 | Norway | 20 | (0) |
- * Club domestic league appearances and goals as of 13 August 2018 ‡ National team caps and goals as of 13 August 2018

Ingrid Schjelderup (born 21 December 1987) is a Norwegian former footballer who played as a midfielder. She has previously played for Norwegian Toppserien clubs Kolbotn, Vålerenga and Stabæk as well as Sweden's Linköpings FC and Italy's Fiorentina. She made her debut for the Norway women's national football team in March 2009 and was part of her country's squad at the 2015 FIFA Women's World Cup.

== Club career ==
In November 2009, Schjelderup and Nora Holstad Berge both left Kolbotn to join Swedish Damallsvenskan champions Linköpings FC.

Schjelderup returned to Sweden in December 2015, joining Eskilstuna United DFF from Stabæk on a one-year contract. She declared that she was looking forward to representing one of the Damallsvenskan's best teams. In January 2018 Schjelderup went back to Norway and Vålerenga.

== International career ==
Schjelderup made her senior Norway women's national football team debut in March 2009, in a 2–0 Algarve Cup win over Denmark. After that tournament, Schjelderup was not called up again until 2014. She was selected in Even Pellerud's squad for the 2015 FIFA Women's World Cup.
