= Katrien Torfs =

Belgian footballer (born 1987)

Personal information
- Full name: Katrien Torfs
- Date of birth: November 10, 1987 (age 38)
- Place of birth: Leuven, Belgium
- Position: Midfielder

Youth career
- 1992–1994: Fast Bertem
- 1994–2003: Oud-Heverlee Leuven

Senior career*
| Years | Team | Apps | (Gls) |
| 2003–2007 | Oud-Heverlee Leuven | | |
| 2007–2011 | Standard Liège | | |
| 2012–2014 | Oud-Heverlee Leuven | | |

International career
| 2003 | Belgium U17 | 5 | (1) |
| 2004–2005 | Belgium U19 | 6 | (0) |
| 2009–2010 | Belgium | 5 | (0) |
- * Club domestic league appearances and goals

Katrien Torfs (born 10 November 1987) is a former Belgian football player.

== Biography ==
Born in Leuven, Torfs started at the age of five at Rapide Bertem. She made her transfer to the youth teams of Oud-Heverlee Leuven at the age of 7 where she stage until 2007.

As from 2007 she played for Standard Liège until 2011.

After a short break, she returned to her senior home club Oud-Heverlee Leuven where she played for 2 seasons in the BeNe League.

=== Champions League ===
She played 2 games with Standard Liège in the Champions League. They stranded in the round of 32 against Montpelier. The first game was a 0–0 draw. They lost the second with 1–3. She played in total 127 minutes.

=== BeNe League ===
After she left Standard, she retired from football but when the BeNe League was created, OHL asked her to rejoin the club. In the first season OHL ended 7th with 13 points in BeNe League Red and they had to play in the second stage in BeNe League B, where they ended on the 5th place.

The second and final year she played at OHL in the BeNe League, she only played 1 game for 12 minutes. OHL ended on the 10th place.

== Awards ==
- Champion of Belgium (2): 2009 – 2011
- Finalist of the Cup of Belgium : 2009
- Winner of the Super Cup of Belgium (1): 2009
- Dubbed Belgian Championship – Super Cup Belgium (1): 2009

== Statistics ==
=== Club ===
As of match played 29 May 2017

Champions League
| Year | Club | Apps | Goals | Minutes |
|---|---|---|---|---|
| 2009–10 | Standard Liège | 2 | 0 | 127 |
| Total | | 2 | 0 | 127 |

BeNe League
| Year | Club | Apps | Goals | Minutes |
|---|---|---|---|---|
| 2012–13 | OHL | 23 | 1 | 1247 |
| 2013–14 | OHL | 1 | 0 | 12 |
| Total | | 24 | 1 | 1259 |

=== International ===
==== Youth ====
As of match played 29 May 2017

Belgium U17
| Year | Apps | Goals | Minutes |
|---|---|---|---|
| 2003 | 5 | 1 | 285 |
| Total | 5 | 1 | 285 |

Belgium U19
| Year | Apps | Goals | Minutes |
|---|---|---|---|
| 2004 | 3 | 0 | 194 |
| 2005 | 3 | 0 | 143 |
| Total | 6 | 0 | 337 |

==== Senior ====
As of match played 17 May 2017

Belgium
| Year | Apps | Goals | Minutes |
|---|---|---|---|
| 2009 | 4 | 0 | 129 |
| 2010 | 1 | 0 | 10 |
| Total | 5 | 0 | 139 |
