= Justien Odeurs =

Belgian footballer

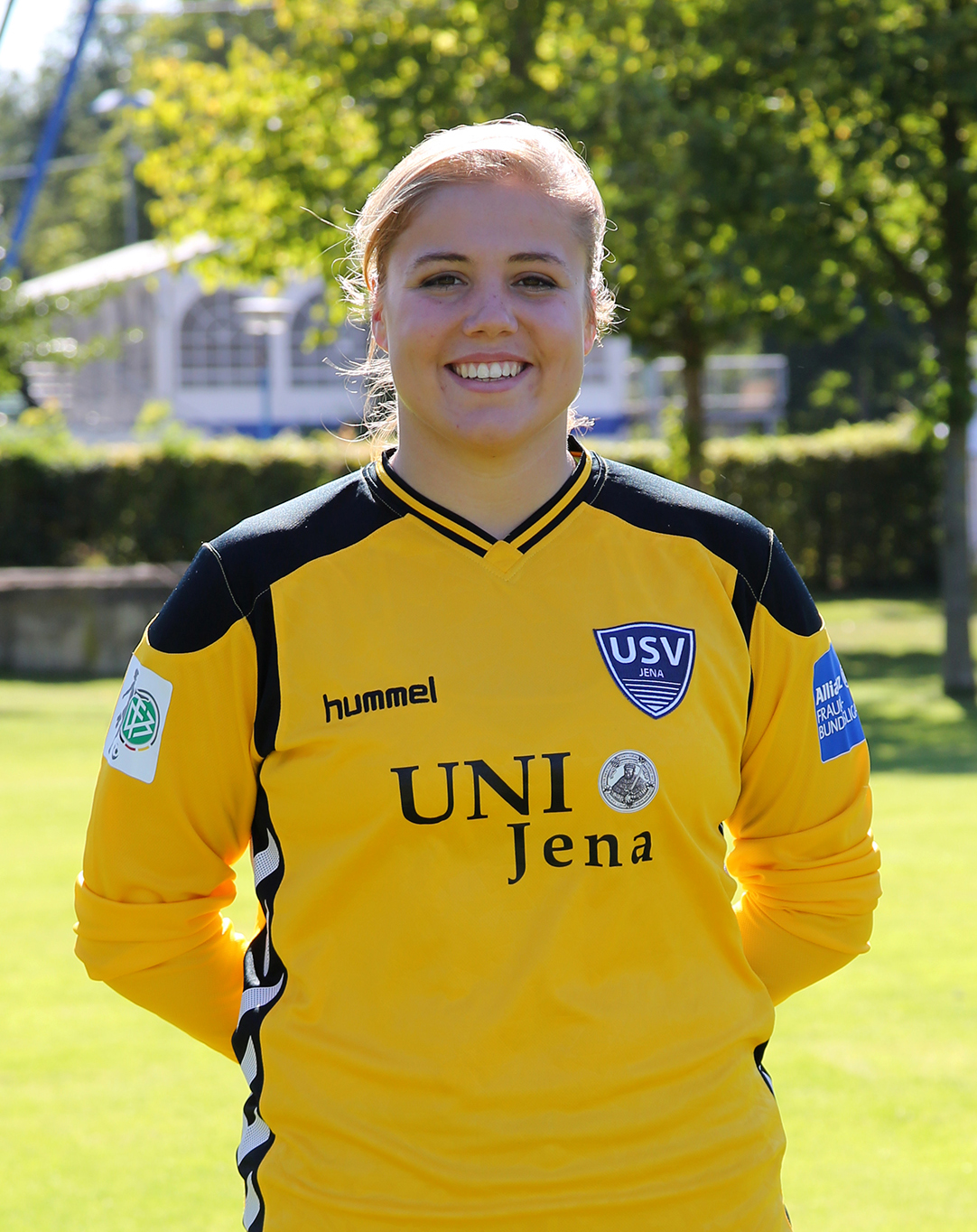
- Odeurs in 2016

Personal information
- Full name: Justien Odeurs
- Date of birth: 30 May 1997 (age 29)
- Place of birth: Sint-Truiden, Belgium
- Height: 1.75 m (5 ft 9 in)
- Position: Goalkeeper

Team information
- Current team: Anderlecht
- Number: 13

Senior career*
Years	Team	Apps	(Gls)
2013–2014	Anderlecht		
2014–2015	Lierse SK		
2016–2018	FF USV Jena	20	(0)
2018–	Anderlecht	0	(0)

International career^{‡}
2014–	Belgium	44	(0)
- * Club domestic league appearances and goals ‡ National team caps and goals as of 8 November 2021

Justien Odeurs (born 30 May 1997) is a Belgian footballer who plays for RSC Anderlecht and the Belgium national team.

She played for Belgium at UEFA Women's Euro 2017.
