= Katrine Veje =

Danish footballer (born 1991)

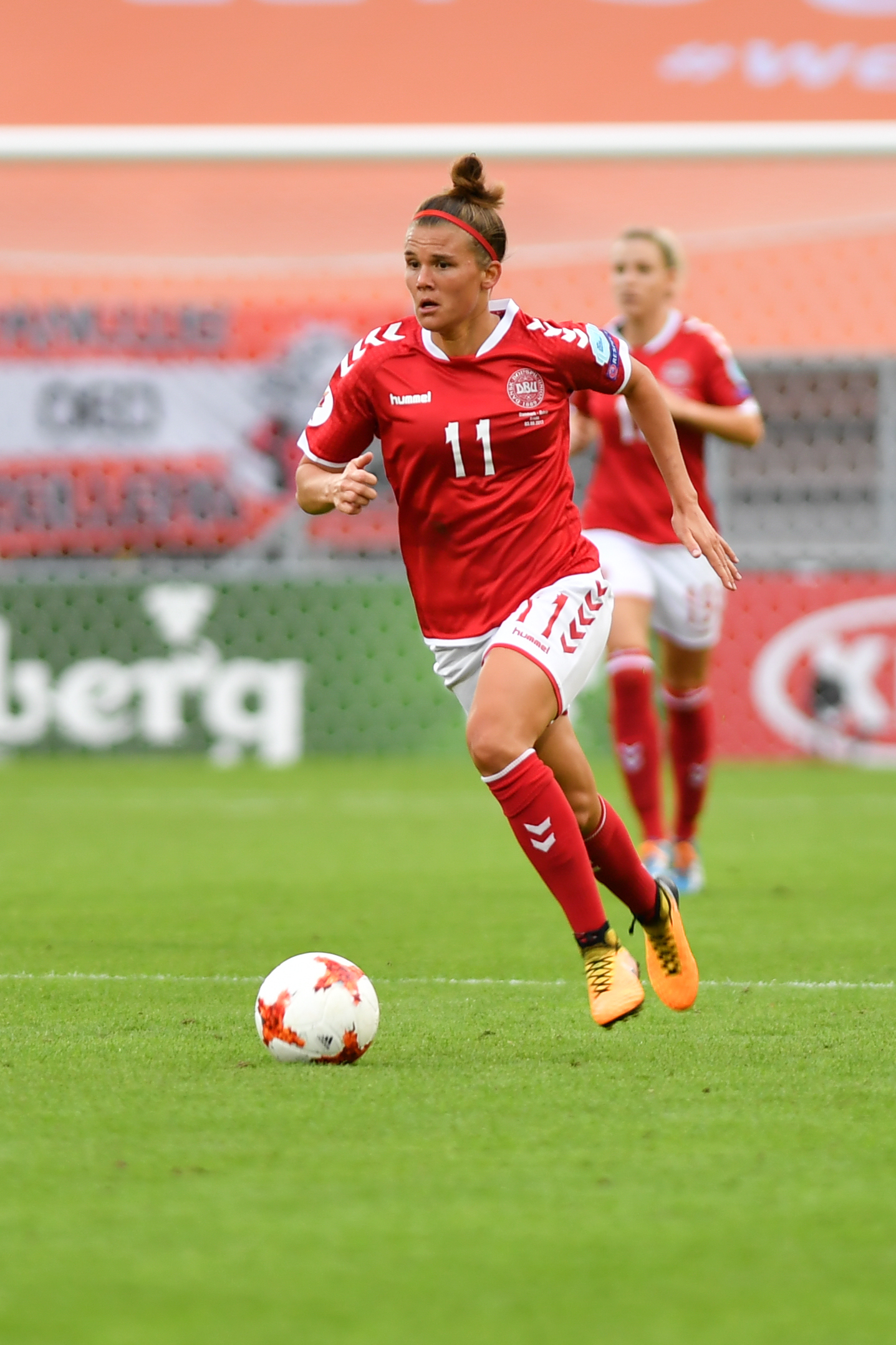
- Veje playing for Denmark in August 2017

Personal information
- Full name: Katrine Vejsgaard Veje
- Date of birth: 19 June 1991 (age 35)
- Place of birth: Fredericia, Denmark
- Height: 1.74 m (5 ft 9 in)
- Positions: Defender; left wing-back

Team information
- Current team: Toluca
- Number: 24

Senior career*
Years	Team	Apps	(Gls)
2006–2007	Vejle B		
2007–2011	OB	1	(0)
2011–2013	LdB FC Malmö	47	(8)
2014–2015	Brøndby	6	(0)
2015	→ Seattle Reign FC (loan)	11	(0)
2015–2017	Brøndby	133	(19)
2017–2018	Montpellier	22	(3)
2019–2020	Arsenal	8	(0)
2020–2022	FC Rosengård	42	(2)
2022–2024	Everton	27	(0)
2024–2025	Crystal Palace	11	(0)
2025–2026	Roma	29	(0)
2026–	Toluca	2	(0)

International career^{‡}
2006–2008	Denmark U17	24	(8)
2007–2009	Denmark U19	13	(3)
2009–	Denmark	171	(9)
Medal record
Women's football
Representing Denmark
UEFA Women's Championship
Silver medal – second place	2017 Netherlands	Team
- * Club domestic league appearances and goals as of 12:50, 17 September 2026 (UTC) ‡ National team caps and goals as of 12:50, 3 September 2026 (UTC)

Katrine Vejsgaard Veje (Danish: [kʰæˈtsʰʁiˀnə ˈvɑjsˌkɒˀ ˈvɑjə, – ˈvɑːj]; born 19 June 1991) is a Danish professional footballer who plays as a centre-back, left back or left wing-back for Liga Femenil side Toluca and the Danish national team.

Veje has previously played for Arsenal in the FA WSL, LdB FC Malmö of Sweden's Damallsvenskan, Seattle Reign FC of the National Women's Soccer League as well as Odense Q and Brøndby IF of Denmark's Elitedivisionen.

== Club career ==
In 2007, Veje was awarded the Danish Football Association's prize for Young Player of the Year.

=== Seattle Reign ===
In January 2015, it was announced that Veje had signed with Seattle Reign FC for the third season of the National Women's Soccer League in the United States. Of her signing, Reign FC head coach Laura Harvey said, "I have had my eye on Katrine for many years, having first seen her when I was an assistant coach with the U17 England squad...We believe she is capable of bringing something special to our club and to the NWSL." She made her first appearance for Seattle on 12 July 2015 against Portland.

=== Brøndby IF ===
In October 2015, Veje decided to return to Brøndby IF. With Brøndby IF, she won the Danish league and cup in 2017.

=== Montpellier HSC ===
In June 2017, it was announced that Veje had signed a two-year contract with the Division 1 Féminine runners-up Montpellier HSC.

=== Arsenal ===
In January 2019, it was announced that Veje had signed a contract with Arsenal.

=== Everton ===
On 19 July 2024, it was announced that Veje had left Everton.

=== Crystal Palace ===
On 1 August 2024, it was announced that Veje had signed a contract with Crystal Palace. On 10 June 2025, it was announced that Veje was departing the club upon the end of the 2024–25 season, having made a total of 20 competitive appearances for Palace.

== International career ==
Veje debuted on the Danish national team in a friendly against England in 2009. She was named to national coach Kenneth Heiner-Møller's Denmark squad for UEFA Women's Euro 2013 as well as to Nils Nielsen's UEFA Women's Euro 2017 squad.

== International goals ==
No.	Date	Venue	Opponent	Score	Result	Competition
1.	4 April 2012	FK Viktoria Stadion, Prague, Czech Republic	Czech Republic	1–0	2–0	UEFA Women's Euro 2013 qualifying

== Honors and awards ==
LdB FC Malmö (now FC Rosengård)

- Damallsvenskan: 2011, 2013
- Swedish Super Cup: 2011, 2012

Seattle Reign FC

- NWSL Shield: 2015

Brøndby IF

- Danish League: 2015, 2017
- Danish Women's Cup: 2015, 2017

Arsenal

- FA Women's Super League: 2018–19
- Women's League Cup: 218–19

FC Rosengård

- Damallsvenskan: 2021
- Swedish Cup: 2021–22 (did not play in final)

== See also ==
- List of women's footballers with 100 or more international caps
