= Jana Coryn =

Belgian football striker

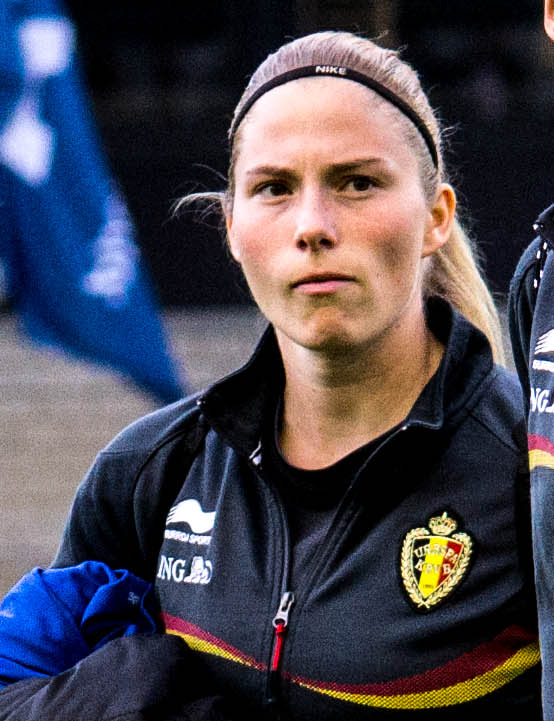
- Coryn in 2014

Personal information
- Full name: Jana Coryn
- Date of birth: 26 June 1992 (age 34)
- Place of birth: Waregem, Belgium
- Position: Striker

Team information
- Current team: Zulte Waregem
- Number: 9

Senior career*
Years	Team	Apps	(Gls)
2010–2012	Zulte Waregem		
2012–2013	R.S.C. Anderlecht	8	(1)
2013–2015	Club Brugge	47	(3)
2015–2016	Lierse SK		(19)
2016–2019	Lille OSC	24	(7)
2020–	Zulte Waregem	0	(0)

International career^{‡}
2007–2009	Belgium U17	13	(7)
2009–2011	Belgium U19	19	(7)
2011–	Belgium	29	(2)
- * Club domestic league appearances and goals as of 2 August 2020 ‡ National team caps and goals as of 10 April 2018

Jana Coryn (born 26 June 1992) is a Belgian football striker currently playing for Zulte Waregem in the Super League. She previously represented R.S.C. Anderlecht, SV Zulte Waregem, Club Brugge and Lierse SK in the Belgian First Division.

She is a member of the Belgian national team. As an under-19 international she played the 2011 U-19 European Championship.

At WD Lierse SK she won the top-scorer award in the new Super League Vrouwenvoetbal with 19 goals.
