= Maud Coutereels =

Belgian football midfielder

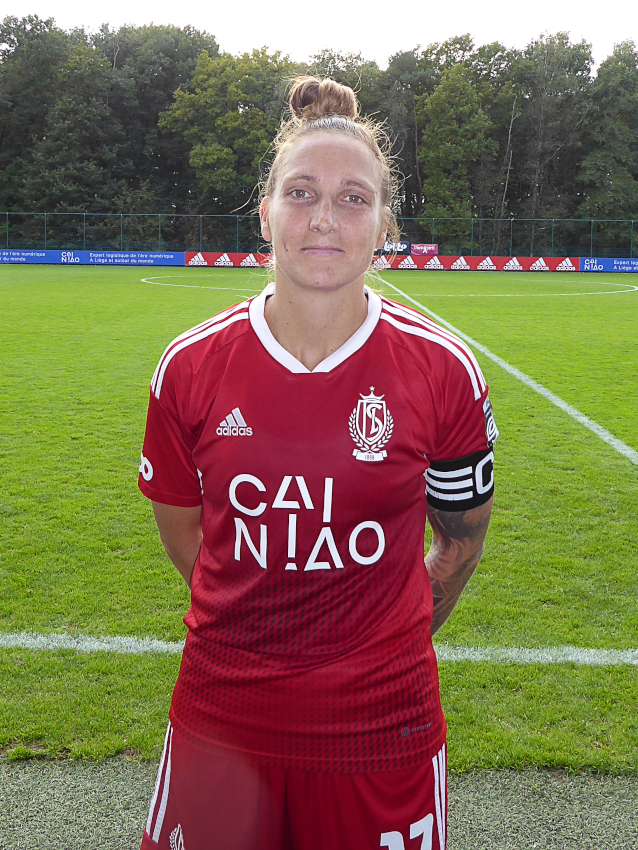
- Maud Coutereels in 2022

Personal information
- Full name: Maud Coutereels
- Date of birth: 21 May 1986 (age 40)
- Place of birth: Sambreville, Belgium
- Height: 1.69 m (5 ft 6 1/2 in)
- Positions: Defender; midfielder

Team information
- Current team: Standard Liège
- Number: 17

Senior career*
Years	Team	Apps	(Gls)
2003–2016	Standard Liège	76	(34)
2016–2019	Lille	42	(1)
2020–	Standard Liège	50	(4)

International career^{‡}
2002–2003	Belgium U17	2	(0)
2002–2005	Belgium U19	18	(3)
2005–	Belgium	90	(9)
- * Club domestic league appearances and goals as of 16 July 2023 ‡ National team caps and goals as of 7 March 2020

Maud Coutereels (born 21 May 1986) is a Belgian football defender currently playing in the Super League for Standard Liège, with whom she has also played the Champions League. She has been a member of the Belgian national team since 2004, and in 2009 she was named Belgian women's footballer of the year.
