= Julie Biesmans =

Belgian footballer

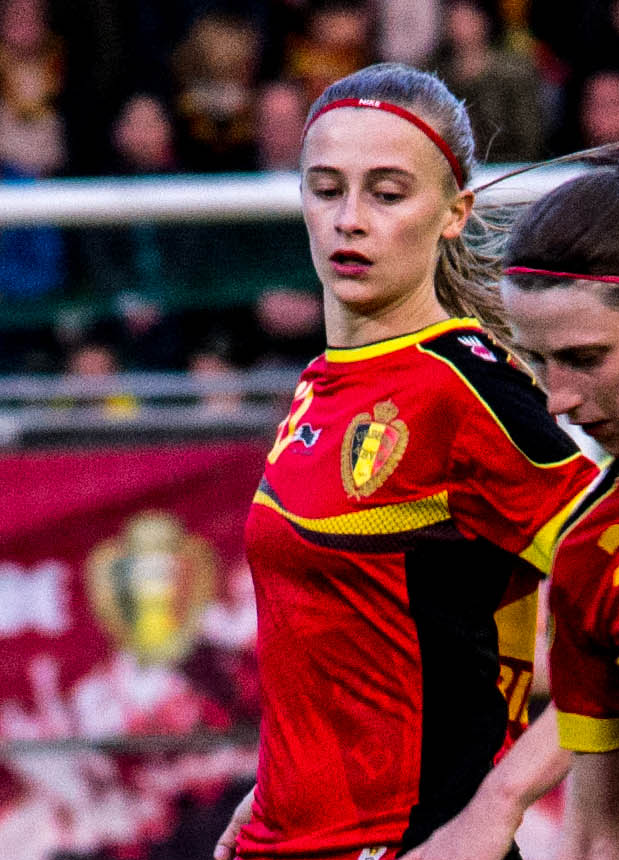
- Biesmans in 2014

Personal information
- Date of birth: 4 May 1994 (age 32)
- Place of birth: Bilzen, Belgium
- Height: 1.73 m (5 ft 8 in)
- Positions: Midfielder; defender

Team information
- Current team: OH Leuven
- Number: 30

Youth career
- 2008–2012: Standard Liège

Senior career*
| Years | Team | Apps | (Gls) |
| 2012–2017 | Standard Liège | 78 | (16) |
| 2017–2019 | Bristol City | 35 | (1) |
| 2019–2023 | PSV | 24 | (2) |
| 2023– | OH Leuven | | |

International career^{‡}
| 2008–2009 | Belgium U15 | 3 | (0) |
| 2009–2011 | Belgium U17 | 18 | (0) |
| 2008–2013 | Belgium U19 | 10 | (1) |
| 2011–2023 | Belgium | 104 | (3) |
- * Club domestic league appearances and goals ‡ National team caps and goals as of 14 April 2024

Julie Biesmans (born 4 May 1994) is a Belgian professional footballer who plays as a midfielder for OH Leuven in the Belgian Women's Super League.

== Club career ==
=== Standard Liège, 2012–2017 ===
Biesmans started her senior career playing for Standard Liège in the Belgium-Netherlands League (BeNe League) (2012–2015) and then Belgian Super League (2015–2017). In 2012–13, she won the Belgium part of the BeNe League and came in second in the BeNe League. She also won the 2012–13 Belgium Super Cup and BeNe Super Cup. Liège and Biesmans also competed in the Champions League losing in the round of 32. She again finished runner up in the 2013–14 BeNe League and excited in the round of 32 in the 2013–14 UEFA Women's Champions League. However, she was part of the squad which won the 2013–14 Belgian Women's Cup. Standard Liege and Biesmans won the 2014–15 BeNe League, which was the last year of the combined Belgium-Netherlands top sides. In the 2014–15 UEFA Women's Champions League Liege went out in the qualifying round. Biesmans won back to back 2015–16 and 2016–17 Belgium Super League titles. In the 2015–16 UEFA Women's Champions League Biesmans and Liège exited in the round of 32. The 2016–17 UEFA Women's Champions League campaign saw Biesman's team fail to get out of the qualifying round.

=== Bristol City, 2017–2019 ===
In August 2017, Biesmans signed with FA WSL side Bristol City. In her first season in the club she made 16 regular season appearances, scoring once. Biesmans extended her Bristol City contract by one year in July 2018. During her second season with the club she started in all 20 regular season games. In May 2019 it was announced that Biesmans was leaving the club.

=== PSV Eindhoven, 2019–2023 ===
On 4 June 2019, it was announced that Biesmans had signed with Eredivisie side PSV Eindhoven.

=== OH Leuven, 2023– ===
On 30 May 2023, Biesmans announced that she had signed with OH Leuven in the Belgian Women's Super League.

== International career ==
Biesmans made her Belgium debut at the U15 level in 2008. She subsequently represented Belgium at the U17 and U19 levels from 2009 to 2011 and 2008–2013 respectively. Biesmans was part of the sides which made it to the second qualifying rounds of the 2011 UEFA Women's Under-17 Championship and 2013 UEFA Women's U-19 Championship.

Biesmans made her senior team debut for the Belgium national team in 2011. She helped the team qualify for its first major tournament, Euro 2017, by scoring two goals. During UEFA Women's Euro 2017 she played in two of the three matches for Belgium. She subsequently helped Belgium in their unsuccessful campaign to qualify for the 2019 FIFA Women's World Cup. Belgium were eliminated in the play-off stage by Switzerland.

At the start of 2022, Biesmans helped Belgium win the Pinatar Cup in Spain for the first time, beating Russia on penalties in the final after a 0–0 draw.

Biesmans featured in Belgium's second appearance at the continental finals, where the Red Flames finished second in UEFA Women's Euro 2022 Group D behind group favourites France, against whom they conceded a narrow defeat (1–2), but ahead of Iceland with a 1–1 draw and Italy, who they edged out 1–0. Belgium lost 1–0 to Sweden in the quarter-finals.

On 31 August 2023, Biesmans announced her retirement from international soccer to spend more time with her family.

== Career statistics ==
As of match played 6 October 2022
Scores and results list Belgium's goal tally first, score column indicates score after each Biesmans goal.

List of international goals scored by Julie Biesmans
| No. | Date | Venue | Opponent | Score | Result | Competition |
|---|---|---|---|---|---|---|
| 1 | 27 October 2015 | Bosnia and Herzegovina FA Training Centre, Zenica, Bosnia and Herzegovina | Bosnia and Herzegovina | 1–0 | 5–0 | UEFA Women's EURO 2017 qualification |
| 2 | 27 October 2015 | Bosnia and Herzegovina FA Training Centre, Zenica, Bosnia and Herzegovina | Bosnia and Herzegovina | 2–0 | 5–0 | UEFA Women's EURO 2017 qualification |
| 3 | 10 June 2018 | Zimbru Stadium, Chișinău, Moldova | Moldova | 4–0 | 7–0 | 2019 FIFA Women's World Cup qualification |

== Honours ==
Standard Liege

- Belgian Women's Super League: 2015–16, 2016–17

Belgium

- Pinatar Cup: 2022

== See also ==
- Instagram
- Twitter
- List of women's footballers with 100 or more international caps
