= Elke Van Gorp =

Belgian football midfielder

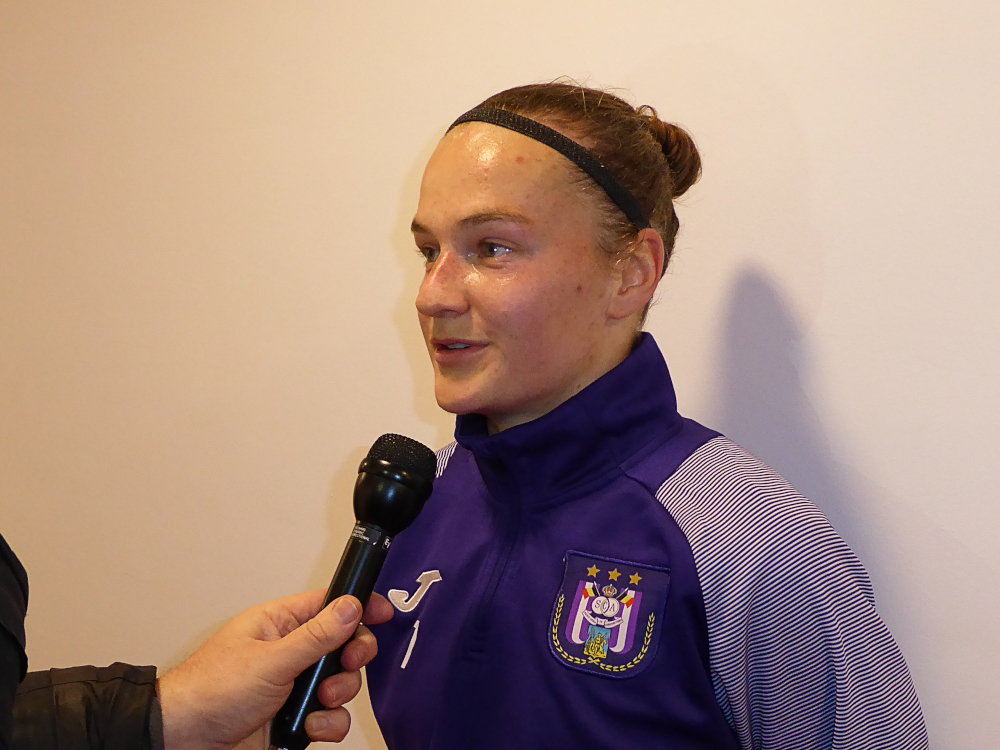
- Van Gorp in 2019

Personal information
- Full name: Elke Van Gorp
- Date of birth: 15 May 1995 (age 31)
- Place of birth: Turnhout, Belgium
- Height: 1.68 m (5 ft 6 in)
- Position: Midfielder

Team information
- Current team: Zulte Waregem
- Number: 14

Senior career*
Years	Team	Apps	(Gls)
2012–2016	Lierse	72	(5)
2016	Gent	0	(0)
2016–2021	Anderlecht	43	(11)
2021-	Zulte Waregem	34	(9)

International career
2010	Belgium U15	1	(0)
2010–2011	Belgium U17	14	(4)
2012–2014	Belgium U19	20	(5)
2014–2019	Belgium	30	(7)
- * Club domestic league appearances and goals as of 16 July 2023 (UTC)

Elke Van Gorp (born 15 May 1995) is a Belgian football midfielder currently playing for Zulte Waregem.

== Honours ==
Lierse

- Belgian Women's Cup: Winner 2015, 2016
