= 2018–19 in Italian football =

Football in Italy
- Season: 2018–19

Men's football
- Serie A: Juventus
- Serie B: Brescia
- Serie C: Virtus Entella; Pordenone; Juve Stabia
- Serie D: Avellino
- Coppa Italia: Lazio
- Supercoppa Italiana: Juventus

Women's football
- Serie A: Juventus

The 2018–19 season was the 117th season of competitive football in Italy.

== Promotions and relegations (pre-season) ==
Teams promoted to Serie A

- Empoli
- Parma
- Frosinone

Teams relegated from Serie A

- Benevento
- Hellas Verona
- Crotone

Teams promoted to Serie B

- Livorno
- Padova
- Lecce
- Cosenza

Teams relegated from Serie B

- Virtus Entella
- Novara
- Ternana
- Pro Vercelli

== National teams ==
=== Men ===
==== Italy national football team ====
The previous season, on 13 November 2017, Italy failed to qualify for the 2018 FIFA World Cup after a 1–0 aggregate loss to Sweden for the first time since the 1958 FIFA World Cup.

===== Friendlies =====
28 May 2018	Italy	2–1	Saudi Arabia	St. Gallen, Switzerland
20:45 CEST (UTC+02:00)	Balotelli 21'; Belotti 69'	Report	Al-Shehri 72'	Stadium: kybunpark Attendance: 10,100; Referee: Sandro Schärer (Switzerland)

1 June 2018	France	3–1	Italy	Nice, France
21:00 CEST (UTC+02:00)	Umtiti 8'; Griezmann 29' (pen.); Dembélé 63'	Report	Bonucci 36'	Stadium: Allianz Riviera; Attendance: 36,000; Referee: Anthony Taylor (England)

4 June 2018	Italy	1–1	Netherlands	Turin, Italy
20:45 CEST (UTC+02:00)	Zaza 67'	Report	Aké 88'	Stadium: Allianz Stadium; Attendance: 20,000; Referee: Vladislav Bezborodov (Russia)

10 October 2018	Italy	1–1	Ukraine	Genoa, Italy
20:45 CEST (UTC+02:00)	Bernardeschi 55'	Report	Malinovskyi 62'	Stadium: Stadio Luigi Ferraris; Attendance: 12,000; Referee: Rade Obrenović (Slovenia)

20 November 2018	Italy	1–0	United States	Genk, Belgium
20:45 CET (UTC+01:00)	Politano 90+4'	Report		Stadium: Luminus Arena; Attendance: 15,000; Referee: Cüneyt Çakır (Turkey)

===== 2018–19 UEFA Nations League A =====
====== Group 3 ======
Pos	Team	Pld	W	D	L	GF	GA	GD	Pts	Qualification (Note: Due to revamp of the format for the 2020–21 UEFA Nations League, no teams were eventually relegated.)	(Portugal)	(Italy)	(Poland)
1	Portugal	4	2	2	0	5	3	+2	8	Qualification for Nations League Finals	—	1–0	1–1
2	Italy	4	1	2	1	2	2	0	5		0–0	—	1–1
3	Poland	4	0	2	2	4	6	−2	2		2–3	0–1	—

Source: UEFA
Rules for classification: Tiebreakers
Notes:

7 September 2018 2018–19 UEFA Nations League	Italy	1–1	Poland	Bologna, Italy
20:45 CEST (UTC+02:00)	Jorginho 78' (pen.)	Report	Zieliński 40'	Stadium: Stadio Renato Dall'Ara; Attendance: 24,000; Referee: Felix Zwayer (Germany)

10 September 2018 2018–19 UEFA Nations League	Portugal	1–0	Italy	Lisbon, Portugal
20:45 CEST (UTC+02:00)	A. Silva 48'	Report		Stadium: Estádio José Alvalade; Attendance: 52,635; Referee: Willie Collum (Scotland)

14 October 2018 2018–19 UEFA Nations League	Poland	0–1	Italy	Chorzów, Poland
20:45 CEST (UTC+02:00)		Report	Biraghi 90+2'	Stadium: Stadion Śląski; Referee: Damir Skomina (Slovenia)

17 November 2018 2018–19 UEFA Nations League	Italy	0–0	Portugal	Milan, Italy
20:45 CET (UTC+01:00)		Report		Stadium: San Siro; Attendance: 73,000; Referee: Danny Makkelie (Netherlands)

===== UEFA Euro 2020 qualifying =====
====== Group J ======
Pos	Team	Pld	W	D	L	GF	GA	GD	Pts	Qualification	(Italy)	(Finland)	(Greece)	(Bosnia and Herzegovina)	(Armenia)	(Liechtenstein)
1	Italy	10	10	0	0	37	4	+33	30	Qualify for final tournament	—	2–0	2–0	2–1	9–1	6–0
2	Finland	10	6	0	4	16	10	+6	18	Qualify for final tournament	1–2	—	1–0	2–0	3–0	3–0
3	Greece	10	4	2	4	12	14	−2	14		0–3	2–1	—	2–1	2–3	1–1
4	Bosnia and Herzegovina	10	4	1	5	20	17	+3	13	Advance to play-offs via Nations League	0–3	4–1	2–2	—	2–1	5–0
5	Armenia	10	3	1	6	14	25	−11	10		1–3	0–2	0–1	4–2	—	3–0
6	Liechtenstein	10	0	2	8	2	31	−29	2		0–5	0–2	0–2	0–3	1–1	—

Source: UEFA
Rules for classification: Qualification tiebreakers

23 March 2019 UEFA Euro 2020 qualifying	Italy	2–0	Finland	Udine, Italy
20:45 CET (UTC+01:00)	Barella 7'; Kean 74'	Report		Stadium: Stadio Friuli; Attendance: 24,000; Referee: Orel Grinfeld (Israel)

26 March 2019 UEFA Euro 2020 qualifying	Italy	6–0	Liechtenstein	Parma, Italy
20:45 CET (UTC+01:00)	Sensi 17'; Verratti 32'; Quagliarella 35' (pen.), 45+3' (pen.); Kean 69'; Pavoletti 76'	Report		Stadium: Stadio Ennio Tardini; Attendance: 20,000; Referee: Kirill Levnikov (Russia)

8 June 2019 UEFA Euro 2020 qualifying	Greece	0–3	Italy	Athens, Greece
20:45 CEST (UTC+02:00)		Report	Barella 23'; Insigne 30'; Bonucci 33'	Stadium: Olympic Stadium; Attendance: 19,828; Referee: Anthony Taylor (England)

11 June 2019 UEFA Euro 2020 qualifying	Italy	2–1	Bosnia and Herzegovina	Turin, Italy
20:45 CEST (UTC+02:00)	Insigne 49'; Verratti 86'	Report	Džeko 32'	Stadium: Juventus Stadium; Attendance: 29,100; Referee: Xavier Estrada Fernández (Spain)

=== Women ===
==== Friendlies ====
9 October 2018	Italy	1–0	Sweden	Cremona, Italy
18:15 (UTC+1)	Sabatino 57'			Stadium: Stadio Giovanni Zini; Attendance: 2,000; Referee: Tanja Subotic (Slovenia)

10 November 2018	Germany	5–2	Italy	Osnabrück, Germany
16:00 (UTC+1)	Magull 6'; Däbritz 18'; Gwinn 50'; Petermann 60'; Maier 86'		Bonansea 29'; Sabatino 43'	Stadium: Stadion an der Bremer Brücke; Attendance: 5,900; Referee: Ivana Martinčić (Croatia)

18 January 2019	Italy	2–1	Chile	Empoli, Italy
18:00 (UTC+1)	Mauro 73'; Tarenzi 90+3'	Report	Girelli 32' (o.g.)	Stadium: Stadio Carlo Castellani; Referee: Shona Shukrula (Netherlands)

22 January 2019	Italy	2–0	Wales	Cesena, Italy
18:15 (UTC+1)	Mauro 15', 45'	Report		Stadium: Stadio Dino Manuzzi; Referee: Marina Višnjić (Serbia)

5 April 2019	Poland	1–1	Italy	Lublin, Poland
18:00 (UTC+2)	Pajor 28'	Report	Cernoia 26'	Stadium: Arena Lublin

9 April 2019	Italy	2–1	Republic of Ireland	Reggio Emilia, Italy
18:30 (UTC+2)	Bonansea 41'; Sabatino 54'	Report	McCabe 3'	Stadium: Mapei Stadium – Città del Tricolore

29 May 2019	Italy	3–1	Switzerland	Ferrara, Italy
16:00 (UTC+2)	Galli 32'; Girelli 61'; Sabatino 89'	Report	Reuteler 83'	Stadium: Stadio Paolo Mazza; Attendance: 1,700; Referee: Tess Olofsson (Sweden)

==== 2019 FIFA Women's World Cup qualification (UEFA) ====
===== UEFA Group 6 =====
Pos	Team	Pld	W	D	L	GF	GA	GD	Pts	Qualification	Italy	Belgium	Portugal	Romania	Moldova
1	Italy	8	7	0	1	19	4	+15	21	2019 FIFA Women's World Cup	—	2–1	3–0	3–0	5–0
2	Belgium	8	6	1	1	28	6	+22	19	Play-offs	2–1	—	1–1	3–2	12–0
3	Portugal	8	3	2	3	22	8	+14	11		0–1	0–1	—	5–1	8–0
4	Romania	8	1	2	5	7	15	−8	5		0–1	0–1	1–1	—	3–1
5	Moldova	8	0	1	7	2	45	−43	1		1–3	0–7	0–7	0–0	—

Source: UEFA
8 June 2018
20:45

Italy	3–0	Portugal
Girelli 4'; Salvai 13'; Bonansea 90+1'	Report

Stadio Artemio Franchi, Florence
Attendance: 6,500
Referee: Pernilla Larsson (Sweden)

4 September 2018
17:00

Belgium	2–1	Italy
Vanmechelen 6', 35'	Report	Girelli 30' (pen.)

Den Dreef, Leuven
Attendance: 2,758
Referee: Florence Guillemin (France)

==== Cyprus Women's Cup ====
===== Group B =====
Pos	Team	Pld	W	D	L	GF	GA	GD	Pts
1	Italy	3	3	0	0	12	1	+11	9
2	Mexico	3	1	1	1	5	9	−4	4
3	Thailand	3	1	0	2	6	6	0	3
4	Hungary	3	0	1	2	3	10	−7	1

Source: Cypruswomenscup
Rules for classification: 1) Points; 2) Goal difference; 3) Goals scored

27 February 2019	Mexico	0–5	Italy	Larnaca, Cyprus
			Bergamaschi 45'; Bonansea 50'; Giacinti 70', 78'; Mauro 66'	Stadium: Antonis Papadopoulos Stadium

1 March 2019	Hungary	0–3	Italy	Larnaca, Cyprus
			Giacinti 18', 43'; Serturini 54'	Stadium: GSZ Stadium

4 March 2019	Italy	4–1	Thailand	Larnaca, Cyprus
	Bonansea 19'; Sabatino 54'; Galli 57'; Chinwong 89' (o.g.)		Dangda 67'	Stadium: AEK Arena; Referee: Katalin Kulcsár (Hungary)

===== Final =====
6 March 2019	North Korea	3–3 (7–6 p)	Italy	Larnaca, Cyprus
	Kim 38'; Ju 45+1'; Yon 106'		Girelli 19'; Sabatino 79'; Cernoia 111'	Stadium: GSZ Stadium; Referee: Riem Hussein (Germany)
	Penalties
	Yon (penalty scored); Kim (penalty scored); Ju (penalty scored); Pak S. (penalty scored); Pak K. (penalty scored); Ri P. (penalty scored); Ri U. (penalty scored)		(penalty scored) Giugliano; (penalty scored) Girelli; (penalty scored) Serturini; (penalty scored) Cernoia; (penalty scored) Sabatino; (penalty scored) Salvai; (penalty missed) Bonansea

==== 2019 FIFA Women's World Cup ====
===== Group C =====
Pos	Team	Pld	W	D	L	GF	GA	GD	Pts	Qualification
1	Italy	3	2	0	1	7	2	+5	6	Advance to knockout stage
2	Australia	3	2	0	1	8	5	+3	6	Advance to knockout stage
3	Brazil	3	2	0	1	6	3	+3	6	Advance to knockout stage
4	Jamaica	3	0	0	3	1	12	−11	0	

Source: FIFA
Rules for classification: Group stage tiebreakers

9 June 2019 Group C	Australia	1–2	Italy	Valenciennes, France
13:00	Kerr 22'	Report	Bonansea 56', 90+5'	Stadium: Stade du Hainaut; Attendance: 15,380; Referee: Melissa Borjas (Honduras)

13 June 2019 Group C	Jamaica	0–5	Italy	Reims, France
18:00		Report	Girelli 12' (pen.), 25', 46'; Galli 71', 81'	Stadium: Stade Auguste-Delaune; Attendance: 12,016; Referee: Anna-Marie Keighley (New Zealand)

18 June 2019 Group C	Italy	0–1	Brazil	Valenciennes, France
21:00		Report	Marta 74' (pen.)	Stadium: Stade du Hainaut; Attendance: 21,669; Referee: Lucila Venegas (Mexico)

===== Knockout stage =====
25 June 2019 Round of 16	Italy	2–0	China	Montpellier, France
18:00	Giacinti 15'; Galli 49'	Report		Stadium: Stade de la Mosson; Attendance: 17,032; Referee: Edina Alves Batista (Brazil)

29 June 2019 Quarter-finals	Italy	0–2	Netherlands	Valenciennes, France
15:00		Report	Miedema 70'; Van der Gragt 80'	Stadium: Stade du Hainaut; Attendance: 22,600; Referee: Claudia Umpiérrez (Uruguay)

== League season ==
=== Serie A ===
Pos	Team	Pld	W	D	L	GF	GA	GD	Pts	Qualification or relegation
1	Juventus (C)	38	28	6	4	70	30	+40	90	Qualification for the Champions League group stage
2	Napoli	38	24	7	7	74	36	+38	79	Qualification for the Champions League group stage
3	Atalanta	38	20	9	9	77	46	+31	69 (Note: Atalanta finished ahead of Internazionale on head-to-head points: Atalanta 4–1 Internazionale, Internazionale 0–0 Atalanta.)	Qualification for the Champions League group stage
4	Inter Milan	38	20	9	9	57	33	+24	69	Qualification for the Champions League group stage
5	Milan (Note: Milan were excluded from UEFA competitions over financial fair play violation.)	38	19	11	8	55	36	+19	68	
6	Roma	38	18	12	8	66	48	+18	66	Qualification for the Europa League group stage
7	Torino	38	16	15	7	52	37	+15	63	Qualification for the Europa League second qualifying round
8	Lazio	38	17	8	13	56	46	+10	59	Qualification for the Europa League group stage (Note: Lazio qualified for the Europa League group stage by winning the 2018–19 Coppa Italia)
9	Sampdoria	38	15	8	15	60	51	+9	53	
10	Bologna	38	11	11	16	48	56	−8	44	
11	Sassuolo	38	9	16	13	53	60	−7	43	
12	Udinese	38	11	10	17	39	53	−14	43	
13	SPAL	38	11	9	18	44	56	−12	42	
14	Parma	38	10	11	17	41	61	−20	41 (Note: Positions determined by head-to-head points: Parma: 9 pts; Cagliari: 7 pts; Fiorentina: 1 pt.)	
15	Cagliari	38	10	11	17	36	54	−18	41	
16	Fiorentina	38	8	17	13	47	45	+2	41	
17	Genoa	38	8	14	16	39	57	−18	38 (Note: Genoa finished ahead of Empoli on head-to-head points: Genoa 2–1 Empoli, Empoli 1–3 Genoa.)	
18	Empoli (R)	38	10	8	20	51	70	−19	38	Relegation to Serie B
19	Frosinone (R)	38	5	10	23	29	69	−40	25	Relegation to Serie B
20	Chievo (R)	38	2	14	22	25	75	−50	17 (Note: Chievo were deducted 3 points after being found guilty of false accounting.)	Relegation to Serie B

Source: Serie A, Soccerway
Rules for classification: 1) Points; 2) Head-to-head points; 3) Head-to-head goal difference; 4) Goal difference; 5) Goals scored; 6) Draw. (Note: Head-to-head record is used only after all the matches between the teams in question have been played).
(C) Champions; (R) Relegated

=== Serie B ===
Pos	Team	Pld	W	D	L	GF	GA	GD	Pts	Promotion, qualification or relegation
1	Brescia (C, P)	36	18	13	5	69	42	+27	67	Promotion to Serie A
2	Lecce (P)	36	19	9	8	66	45	+21	66	Promotion to Serie A
3	Benevento	36	17	9	10	61	45	+16	60	Qualification to promotion play-offs semi-finals
4	Pescara	36	14	13	9	50	46	+4	55	Qualification to promotion play-offs semi-finals
5	Hellas Verona (O, P)	36	13	13	10	49	46	+3	52	Qualification to promotion play-offs preliminary round
6	Spezia	36	14	9	13	53	46	+7	51 (Note: Spezia finished ahead of Cittadella on head-to-head points: Spezia 1–0 Cittadella, Cittadella 0–1 Spezia.)	Qualification to promotion play-offs preliminary round
7	Cittadella	36	12	15	9	49	38	+11	51	Qualification to promotion play-offs preliminary round
8	Perugia	36	14	8	14	49	49	0	50	Qualification to promotion play-offs preliminary round
9	Cremonese	36	12	13	11	37	33	+4	49	
10	Cosenza	36	11	13	12	34	42	−8	46	
11	Palermo (Note: Palermo were initially deducted twenty points for financial irregularities, they were excluded from the 2019–20 Serie B on 12th July 2019.) (R, E, R)	36	16	15	5	57	38	+19	43 (Note: Positions determined by head-to-head points: Palermo: 9 pts; Crotone: 6 pts; Ascoli 3 pts.)	Phoenix in Serie D
12	Crotone	36	11	10	15	40	42	−2	43	
13	Ascoli	36	10	13	13	40	56	−16	43	
14	Livorno	36	9	12	15	38	51	−13	39	
15	Venezia (Note: Venezia was spared from relegation after Palermo's bankruptcy.) (T)	36	8	14	14	35	46	−11	38 (Note: Venezia finished ahead of Salernitana on head-to-head points: Venezia 1–0 Salernitana, Salernitana 1–1 Venezia.)	Relegation play-out (annulled)
16	Salernitana	36	10	8	18	41	57	−16	38	Relegation play-out (annulled)
17	Foggia (Note: Foggia were initially deducted six points for administral irregularities and relegated to 2019-20 Serie C; they were excluded from the 2019–20 Serie C on 12th July 2019.) (R, E, R)	36	10	13	13	44	49	−5	37	Phoenix in Serie D
18	Padova (R)	36	5	16	15	36	49	−13	31	Relegation to Serie C
19	Carpi (R)	36	7	8	21	39	67	−28	29	Relegation to Serie C

Source: Lega Serie B
Rules for classification: 1) Points; 2) Head-to-head points; 3) Head-to-head goal difference; 4) Goal difference; 5) Goals scored; 6) Draw.
(C) Champions; (E) Eliminated; (O) Play-off winners; (P) Promoted; (R) Relegated; (T) Qualified, but not yet for the particular phase indicated

=== Serie C ===
Group A (North & Central West)

Pos	Team	Pld	Pts
1	Virtus Entella (P)	37	75
2	Piacenza	37	74
3	Pisa (O, P)	37	69
4	Arezzo	37	64
5	Pro Vercelli	37	64
6	Robur Siena	37	63
7	Carrarese	37	62
8	Pro Patria	37	57
9	Novara	37	50
10	Alessandria	37	45
11	Pontedera	37	45
12	Juventus U23	37	42
13	Olbia	37	38
14	Arzachena (D, R)	37	37
15	Pistoiese	37	35
16	Gozzano	37	33
17	Albissola (D, R)	37	28
18	Cuneo (D, R)	37	24
19	Lucchese (O, D, R)	37	20
20	Pro Piacenza (D, R)	19	0

Source: Lega Pro
(D) Disqualified;
(O) Play-off winners;
(P) Promoted;
(R) Relegated
Group B (North & Central East)

Pos	Team	Pld	Pts
1	Pordenone (C, P)	38	73
2	Triestina	38	67
3	Imolese	38	62
4	Feralpisalò	38	62
5	Monza	38	60
6	Südtirol	38	55
7	Ravenna	38	55
8	L.R. Vicenza	38	51
9	Sambenedettese	38	50
10	Fermana	38	47
11	Ternana	38	44
12	Gubbio	38	44
13	Teramo	38	43
14	Albinoleffe	38	43
15	Vis Pesaro	38	42
16	Giana Erminio	38	42
17	Renate	38	39
18	Rimini (O)	38	39
19	Virtus Verona	38	38
20	Fano	38	38

Source: Lega Pro
(C) Champions;
(O) Play-off winners;
(P) Promoted
Group C (South)

Pos	Team	Pld	Pts
1	Juve Stabia (P)	36	77
2	Trapani (O, P)	36	73
3	Catanzaro	36	67
4	Catania	36	65
5	Potenza	36	57
6	Virtus Francavilla	36	55
7	Reggina	36	52
8	Monopoli	36	51
9	Casertana	36	51
10	Rende	36	47
11	Cavese	36	47
12	Viterbese Castrense	36	45
13	Sicula Leonzio	36	42
14	Vibonese	36	42
15	Rieti	36	39
16	Siracusa (D, R)	36	36
17	Bisceglie	36	29
18	Paganese	36	23
19	Matera (D, R)	36	−18

Source: Lega Pro
(D) Disqualified;
(O) Play-off winners;
(P) Promoted;
(R) Relegated

== Cup competitions ==
=== Coppa Italia ===
==== Final ====
15 May 2019
20:45 CEST (UTC+2)

Atalanta	0–2	Lazio
	Report	Milinković-Savić 82'; Correa 90'

Stadio Olimpico, Rome
Attendance: 57,059
Referee: Luca Banti

=== Supercoppa Italiana ===
16 January 2019
20:30 AST

Juventus	1–0	AC Milan
Ronaldo 61'	Report

King Abdullah Sports City, Jeddah (Saudi Arabia)
Attendance: 61,235
Referee: Luca Banti

== UEFA competitions ==
=== UEFA Champions League ===
==== Group stage ====
===== Group B =====
Pos	Team	Pld	W	D	L	GF	GA	GD	Pts	Qualification	BAR	TOT	INT	PSV
1	(Spain) Barcelona	6	4	2	0	14	5	+9	14	Advance to knockout phase	—	1–1	2–0	4–0
2	(England) Tottenham Hotspur	6	2	2	2	9	10	−1	8 (Note: Head-to-head away goals: Tottenham Hotspur 1, Inter Milan 0.)	Advance to knockout phase	2–4	—	1–0	2–1
3	(Italy) Inter Milan	6	2	2	2	6	7	−1	8	Transfer to Europa League	1–1	2–1	—	1–1
4	(Netherlands) PSV Eindhoven	6	0	2	4	6	13	−7	2		1–2	2–2	1–2	—

Source: UEFA

===== Group C =====
Pos	Team	Pld	W	D	L	GF	GA	GD	Pts	Qualification	PAR	LIV	NAP	RSB
1	(France) Paris Saint-Germain	6	3	2	1	17	9	+8	11	Advance to knockout phase	—	2–1	2–2	6–1
2	(England) Liverpool	6	3	0	3	9	7	+2	9 (Note: Goals in all group matches: Liverpool 9, Napoli 7.)	Advance to knockout phase	3–2	—	1–0	4–0
3	(Italy) Napoli	6	2	3	1	7	5	+2	9	Transfer to Europa League	1–1	1–0	—	3–1
4	(Serbia) Red Star Belgrade	6	1	1	4	5	17	−12	4		1–4	2–0	0–0	—

Source: UEFA

===== Group G =====
Pos	Team	Pld	W	D	L	GF	GA	GD	Pts	Qualification	RMA	ROM	PLZ	CSKA
1	(Spain) Real Madrid	6	4	0	2	12	5	+7	12	Advance to knockout phase	—	3–0	2–1	0–3
2	(Italy) Roma	6	3	0	3	11	8	+3	9	Advance to knockout phase	0–2	—	5–0	3–0
3	(Czech Republic) Viktoria Plzeň	6	2	1	3	7	16	−9	7 (Note: Head-to-head points: Viktoria Plzeň 4, CSKA Moscow 1.)	Transfer to Europa League	0–5	2–1	—	2–2
4	(Russia) CSKA Moscow	6	2	1	3	8	9	−1	7		1–0	1–2	1–2	—

Source: UEFA

===== Group H =====
Pos	Team	Pld	W	D	L	GF	GA	GD	Pts	Qualification	JUV	MUN	VAL	YB
1	(Italy) Juventus	6	4	0	2	9	4	+5	12	Advance to knockout phase	—	1–2	1–0	3–0
2	(England) Manchester United	6	3	1	2	7	4	+3	10	Advance to knockout phase	0–1	—	0–0	1–0
3	(Spain) Valencia	6	2	2	2	6	6	0	8	Transfer to Europa League	0–2	2–1	—	3–1
4	(Switzerland) Young Boys	6	1	1	4	4	12	−8	4		2–1	0–3	1–1	—

Source: UEFA

==== Knockout phase ====
===== Round of 16 =====
Team 1	Agg.	Team 2	1st leg	2nd leg
Atlético Madrid (Spain)	2–3	(Italy) Juventus	2–0	0–3
Roma (Italy)	3–4	(Portugal) Porto	2–1	1–3 (a.e.t.)

===== Quarter-finals =====
Team 1	Agg.	Team 2	1st leg	2nd leg
Ajax (Netherlands)	3–2	(Italy) Juventus	1–1	2–1

=== UEFA Europa League ===
==== Qualifying phase and play-off round ====
===== Second qualifying round =====
Team 1	Agg.	Team 2	1st leg	2nd leg
Atalanta (Italy)	10–2	(Bosnia and Herzegovina) Sarajevo	2–2	8–0

===== Third qualifying round =====
Team 1	Agg.	Team 2	1st leg	2nd leg
Hapoel Haifa (Israel)	1–6	(Italy) Atalanta	1–4	0–2

===== Play-off round =====
Team 1	Agg.	Team 2	1st leg	2nd leg
Atalanta (Italy)	0–0 (3–4 p)	(Denmark) Copenhagen	0–0	0–0 (a.e.t.)

==== Group stage ====
===== Group F =====
Pos	Team	Pld	W	D	L	GF	GA	GD	Pts	Qualification	BET	OLY	MIL	DUD
1	(Spain) Real Betis	6	3	3	0	7	2	+5	12	Advance to knockout phase	—	1–0	1–1	3–0
2	(Greece) Olympiacos	6	3	1	2	11	6	+5	10 (Note: Goal difference in all group matches: Olympiacos +5, Milan +3.)	Advance to knockout phase	0–0	—	3–1	5–1
3	(Italy) Milan	6	3	1	2	12	9	+3	10		1–2	3–1	—	5–2
4	(Luxembourg) F91 Dudelange	6	0	1	5	3	16	−13	1		0–0	0–2	0–1	—

Source: UEFA
Rules for classification: Group stage tiebreakers

===== Group H =====
Pos	Team	Pld	W	D	L	GF	GA	GD	Pts	Qualification	FRA	LAZ	APL	MAR
1	(Germany) Eintracht Frankfurt	6	6	0	0	17	5	+12	18	Advance to knockout phase	—	4–1	2–0	4–0
2	(Italy) Lazio	6	3	0	3	9	11	−2	9	Advance to knockout phase	1–2	—	2–1	2–1
3	(Cyprus) Apollon Limassol	6	2	1	3	10	10	0	7		2–3	2–0	—	2–2
4	(France) Marseille	6	0	1	5	6	16	−10	1		1–2	1–3	1–3	—

Source: UEFA
Rules for classification: Group stage tiebreakers

==== Knockout phase ====
===== Round of 32 =====
Team 1	Agg.	Team 2	1st leg	2nd leg
Rapid Wien (Austria)	0–5	(Italy) Inter Milan	0–1	0–4
Zürich (Switzerland)	1–5	(Italy) Napoli	1–3	0–2
Lazio (Italy)	0–3	(Spain) Sevilla	0–1	0–2

===== Round of 16 =====
Team 1	Agg.	Team 2	1st leg	2nd leg
Eintracht Frankfurt (Germany)	1–0	(Italy) Inter Milan	0–0	1–0
Napoli (Italy)	4–3	(Austria) Red Bull Salzburg	3–0	1–3

===== Quarter-finals =====
Team 1	Agg.	Team 2	1st leg	2nd leg
Arsenal (England)	3–0 (Note: Order of legs reversed after original draw, in order to avoid a scheduling conflict with the Chelsea v Slavia Prague match in the same city.)	(Italy) Napoli	2–0	1–0

=== UEFA Youth League ===
==== UEFA Champions League Path ====
===== Group B =====
Pos	Team	Pld	W	D	L	GF	GA	GD	Pts	Qualification	BAR	TOT	INT	PSV
1	(Spain) Barcelona	6	3	2	1	8	6	+2	11	Round of 16	—	0–2	2–1	2–1
2	(England) Tottenham Hotspur	6	2	3	1	10	8	+2	9	Play-offs	1–1	—	2–4	2–0
3	(Italy) Inter Milan	6	2	1	3	10	9	+1	7		0–2	1–1	—	3–0
4	(Netherlands) PSV Eindhoven	6	1	2	3	6	11	−5	5		1–1	2–2	2–1	—

Source: UEFA

===== Group C =====
Pos	Team	Pld	W	D	L	GF	GA	GD	Pts	Qualification	LIV	PAR	NAP	RSB
1	(England) Liverpool	6	4	1	1	17	7	+10	13	Round of 16	—	5–2	5–0	2–1
2	(France) Paris Saint-Germain	6	4	1	1	13	10	+3	13	Play-offs	3–2	—	0–0	2–1
3	(Italy) Napoli	6	1	3	2	9	15	−6	6		1–1	2–5	—	5–3
4	(Serbia) Red Star Belgrade	6	0	1	5	6	13	−7	1		0–2	0–1	1–1	—

Source: UEFA

===== Group G =====
Pos	Team	Pld	W	D	L	GF	GA	GD	Pts	Qualification	RMA	ROM	PLZ	CSKA
1	(Spain) Real Madrid	6	6	0	0	20	7	+13	18	Round of 16	—	3–1	3–2	2–1
2	(Italy) Roma	6	3	0	3	14	17	−3	9	Play-offs	1–6	—	3–4	3–1
3	(Czech Republic) Viktoria Plzeň	6	1	2	3	11	14	−3	5		1–2	2–4	—	1–1
4	(Russia) CSKA Moscow	6	0	2	4	6	13	−7	2		1–4	1–2	1–1	—

Source: UEFA

===== Group H =====
Pos	Team	Pld	W	D	L	GF	GA	GD	Pts	Qualification	MUN	JUV	YB	VAL
1	(England) Manchester United	6	5	1	0	20	7	+13	16	Round of 16	—	4–1	6–2	4–0
2	(Italy) Juventus	6	3	1	2	11	11	0	10	Play-offs	2–2	—	2–1	3–0
3	(Switzerland) Young Boys	6	2	1	3	12	15	−3	7		1–2	4–2	—	3–3
4	(Spain) Valencia	6	0	1	5	4	14	−10	1		1–2	0–1	0–1	—

Source: UEFA

==== Play-offs ====
Team 1	Score	Team 2
Dynamo Kyiv (Ukraine)	3–0	(Italy) Juventus
Midtjylland (Denmark)	1–1 (4–2 p)	(Italy) Roma

=== UEFA Women's Champions League ===
==== Knockout phase ====
===== Round of 32 =====
Team 1	Agg.	Team 2	1st leg	2nd leg
Fiorentina (Italy)	4–0	(Denmark) Fortuna Hjørring	2–0	2–0
Juventus (Italy)	2–3	(Denmark) Brøndby	2–2	0–1

===== Round of 16 =====
Team 1	Agg.	Team 2	1st leg	2nd leg
Chelsea (England)	7–0	(Italy) Fiorentina	1–0	6–0
