= 2017–18 in Italian football =

Football in Italy
- Season: 2017–18

Men's football
- Serie A: Juventus
- Serie B: Empoli
- Serie C: Livorno; Padova; Lecce
- Serie D: Pro Patria
- Coppa Italia: Juventus
- Supercoppa Italiana: Lazio

Women's football
- Serie A: Juventus

The 2017–18 season was the 116th season of competitive football in Italy.

== Promotions and relegations (pre-season) ==
Teams promoted to Serie A

- SPAL
- Hellas Verona
- Benevento

Teams relegated from Serie A

- Palermo
- Pescara
- Empoli

Teams promoted to Serie B

- Cremonese
- Venezia
- Foggia
- Parma

Teams relegated from Serie B

- Trapani
- Vicenza
- Pisa
- Latina

== National teams ==
=== Italy national football team ===
On 13 November 2017, Italy failed to qualify for the 2018 FIFA World Cup after a 1–0 aggregate loss to Sweden, the first time they failed to qualify for the World Cup since 1958.

==== 2018 FIFA World Cup qualification ====
Pos	Team	Pld	W	D	L	GF	GA	GD	Pts	Qualification
1	Spain	10	9	1	0	36	3	+33	28	Qualification to 2018 FIFA World Cup
2	Italy	10	7	2	1	21	8	+13	23	Advance to second round
3	Albania	10	4	1	5	10	13	−3	13	
4	Israel	10	4	0	6	10	15	−5	12	
5	Macedonia	10	3	2	5	15	15	0	11	
6	Liechtenstein	10	0	0	10	1	39	−38	0	

Source: FIFA
Rules for classification: Qualification tiebreakers

11 June 2017 2018 FIFA World Cup qualification	Italy	5–0	Liechtenstein	Udine, Italy
20:45 CEST (UTC+02:00)	Insigne 35'; Belotti 52'; Éder 75'; Bernardeschi 83'; Gabbiadini 90+1'	Report		Stadium: Stadio Friuli; Attendance: 20,514; Referee: Kevin Clancy (Scotland)

2 September 2017 2018 FIFA World Cup qualification	Spain	3–0	Italy	Madrid, Spain
20:45 CEST (UTC+02:00)	Isco 13', 40'; Morata 77'	Report		Stadium: Santiago Bernabéu Stadium; Attendance: 66,328; Referee: Björn Kuipers (Netherlands)

5 September 2017 2018 FIFA World Cup qualification	Italy	1–0	Israel	Reggio Emilia, Italy
20:45 CEST (UTC+02:00)	Immobile 53'	Report		Stadium: Mapei Stadium – Città del Tricolore; Attendance: 15,507; Referee: Benoît Bastien (France)

6 October 2017 2018 FIFA World Cup qualification	Italy	1–1	Macedonia	Turin, Italy
20:45 CEST (UTC+02:00)	Chiellini 40'	Report	Trajkovski 77'	Stadium: Stadio Olimpico Grande Torino; Attendance: 23,000; Referee: Tiago Martins (Portugal)

9 October 2017 2018 FIFA World Cup qualification	Albania	0–1	Italy	Shkodër, Albania
20:45 CEST (UTC+02:00)		Report	Candreva 73'	Stadium: Loro Boriçi Stadium; Attendance: 16,000; Referee: Svein Oddvar Moen (Norway)

10 November 2017 2018 FIFA World Cup qualification	Sweden	1–0	Italy	Solna, Sweden
20:45 CET (UTC+01:00)	Johansson 61'	Report		Stadium: Friends Arena; Attendance: 49,193; Referee: Cüneyt Çakır (Turkey)

13 November 2017 2018 FIFA World Cup qualification	Italy	0–0 (0–1 agg.)	Sweden	Milan, Italy
20:45 CET (UTC+01:00)		Report		Stadium: San Siro; Attendance: 72,696; Referee: Antonio Mateu Lahoz (Spain)

==== Friendlies ====
7 June 2017 Friendly	Italy	3–0	Uruguay	Nice, France
21:00 CEST (UTC+02:00)	Giménez 7' (o.g.); Éder 82'; De Rossi 90+3' (pen.)	Report		Stadium: Allianz Riviera; Attendance: 15,000; Referee: Clément Turpin (France)

23 March 2018 Friendly	Italy	0–2	Argentina	Manchester, England
19:45 GMT (UTC±00:00)		Report	Banega 75'; Lanzini 85'	Stadium: Etihad Stadium; Attendance: 25,000; Referee: Martin Atkinson (England)

27 March 2018 Friendly	England	1–1	Italy	London, England
20:00 BST (UTC+01:00)	Vardy 26'	Report	Insigne 87' (pen.)	Stadium: Wembley Stadium; Attendance: 82,598; Referee: Deniz Aytekin (Germany)

=== Women ===
==== 2019 FIFA Women's World Cup qualification (UEFA) ====
===== UEFA Group 6 =====
Pos	Team	Pld	W	D	L	GF	GA	GD	Pts	Qualification	Italy	Belgium	Portugal	Romania	Moldova
1	Italy	8	7	0	1	19	4	+15	21	2019 FIFA Women's World Cup	—	2–1	3–0	3–0	5–0
2	Belgium	8	6	1	1	28	6	+22	19	Play-offs	2–1	—	1–1	3–2	12–0
3	Portugal	8	3	2	3	22	8	+14	11		0–1	0–1	—	5–1	8–0
4	Romania	8	1	2	5	7	15	−8	5		0–1	0–1	1–1	—	3–1
5	Moldova	8	0	1	7	2	45	−43	1		1–3	0–7	0–7	0–0	—

Source: UEFA
15 September 2017
20:30

Italy	5–0	Moldova
Sabatino 9'; Bonansea 22'; Girelli 33', 60'; Bergamaschi 38'	Report

Stadio Alberto Picco, La Spezia
Attendance: 650
Referee: Zuzana Kováčová (Slovakia)

19 September 2017
17:00 (18:00 EEST)

Romania	0–1	Italy
	Report	Corduneanu 77' (o.g.)

Stadionul Dr. Constantin Rădulescu, Cluj-Napoca
Attendance: 1,043
Referee: Monika Mularczyk (Poland)
24 October 2017
15:00

Italy	3–0	Romania
Girelli 51', 76'; Bonansea 78'	Report

Stadio Teofilo Patini, Castel di Sangro
Attendance: 530
Referee: Karolina Radzik-Johan (Poland)
28 November 2017
18:00 (17:00 WET)

Portugal	0–1	Italy
	Report	Sabatino 37'

Estádio António Coimbra da Mota, Estoril
Attendance: 817
Referee: Marta Huerta De Aza (Spain)

6 April 2018
12:00 (13:00 EEST)

Moldova	1–3	Italy
Toma 43'	Report	Tucceri Cimini 8'; Colesnicenco 30' (o.g.); Giacinti 76'

Stadionul CPSM, Vadul lui Vodă
Attendance: 400
Referee: Shona Shukrula (Netherlands)

10 April 2018
18:00

Italy	2–1	Belgium
Rosucci 42'; Girelli 80'	Report	Cayman 37' (pen.)

Stadio Paolo Mazza, Ferrara
Attendance: 7,500
Referee: Katalin Kulcsár (Hungary)

== League season ==
=== Serie A ===
Pos	Team	Pld	W	D	L	GF	GA	GD	Pts	Qualification or relegation
1	Juventus (C)	38	30	5	3	86	24	+62	95	Qualification to Champions League group stage
2	Napoli	38	28	7	3	77	29	+48	91	Qualification to Champions League group stage
3	Roma	38	23	8	7	61	28	+33	77	Qualification to Champions League group stage
4	Internazionale	38	20	12	6	66	30	+36	72	Qualification to Champions League group stage
5	Lazio	38	21	9	8	89	49	+40	71 (Note: Lazio were deducted 1 point by the Italian Football Federation)	Qualification to Europa League group stage (Note: Since the winners of the 2017–18 Coppa Italia, Juventus, qualified for European competition based on league position, the spot awarded to the cup winners (Europa League group stage) was passed to the sixth-placed team and the spot awarded to the sixth-placed team (Europa League second qualifying round) was passed to the seventh-placed team.)
6	Milan (Note: Milan was originally banned from European competition due to violations against Financial Fair Play regulations. They appealed to the Court of Arbitration for Sport, and the ban was overturned on 20 July 2018.)	38	18	10	10	56	42	+14	64	Qualification to Europa League group stage
7	Atalanta	38	16	12	10	57	39	+18	60	Qualification to Europa League second qualifying round
8	Fiorentina	38	16	9	13	54	46	+8	57	
9	Torino	38	13	15	10	54	46	+8	54	
10	Sampdoria	38	16	6	16	56	60	−4	54	
11	Sassuolo	38	11	10	17	29	59	−30	43	
12	Genoa	38	11	8	19	33	43	−10	41	
13	Chievo	38	10	10	18	36	59	−23	40 (Note: Chievo finished ahead of Udinese on head-to-head points: Chievo 1–1 Udinese, Udinese 1–2 Chievo.)	
14	Udinese	38	12	4	22	48	63	−15	40	
15	Bologna	38	11	6	21	40	52	−12	39	
16	Cagliari	38	11	6	21	33	61	−28	39	
17	SPAL	38	8	14	16	39	59	−20	38	
18	Crotone (R)	38	9	8	21	40	66	−26	35	Relegation to Serie B
19	Hellas Verona (R)	38	7	4	27	30	78	−48	25	Relegation to Serie B
20	Benevento (R)	38	6	3	29	33	84	−51	21	Relegation to Serie B

Source: Serie A, Soccerway
Rules for classification: 1) Points; 2) Head-to-head points; 3) Head-to-head goal difference; 4) Goal difference; 5) Goals scored; 6) Draw.
(C) Champions; (R) Relegated

=== Serie B ===
Pos	Team	Pld	W	D	L	GF	GA	GD	Pts	Promotion, qualification or relegation
1	Empoli (C, P)	42	24	13	5	88	49	+39	85	Promotion to Serie A
2	Parma (P)	42	21	9	12	57	37	+20	72 (Note: Parma is ahead of Frosinone on head-to-head goal difference: Parma 2–0 Frosinone, Frosinone 2–1 Parma.)	Promotion to Serie A
3	Frosinone (O, P)	42	19	15	8	65	47	+18	72	Qualification to promotion play-offs semi-finals
4	Palermo	42	18	17	7	59	39	+20	71	Qualification to promotion play-offs semi-finals
5	Venezia	42	17	16	9	56	42	+14	67	Qualification to promotion play-offs preliminary round
6	Cittadella	42	18	12	12	61	48	+13	66	Qualification to promotion play-offs preliminary round
7	Bari (Note: Bari was deducted two points for administrative irregularities. The team was reestablished in 2018 after the bankruptcy of the previous legal person) (R, D, R)	42	18	13	11	59	48	+11	65	Relegation to Serie D (Note: Bari, Cesena and Avellino were excluded from the league after the season for financial issues.)
8	Perugia	42	16	12	14	67	58	+9	60	Qualification to promotion play-offs preliminary round
9	Foggia	42	16	10	16	66	68	−2	58	
10	Spezia	42	13	14	15	46	45	+1	53	
11	Carpi	42	12	16	14	32	46	−14	52	
12	Salernitana	42	11	18	13	51	58	−7	51	
13	Cesena (Note: A.C. Cesena bankrupted in mid-2018. A.S.D. Romagna Centro Cesena; another team from Cesena was renamed to Cesena F.C. which would participate in 2018–19 Serie D) (E, R)	42	11	17	14	55	61	−6	50	Relegation to Serie D
14	Cremonese	42	9	21	12	48	47	+1	48 (Note: Head-to-head points: Cremonese 10 pts, Avellino 8 pts, Brescia 7 pts, Pescara 6 pts.)	
15	Avellino (R, E, R, R)	42	11	15	16	49	60	−11	48	Relegation to Serie D
16	Brescia	42	11	15	16	41	52	−11	48	
17	Pescara	42	11	15	16	50	64	−14	48	
18	Ascoli (O)	42	11	13	18	40	60	−20	46	Qualification to relegation play-out
19	Virtus Entella (R)	42	10	14	18	41	54	−13	44 (Note: Virtus Entella is ahead of Novara on head-to-head points: Virtus Entella 2–1 Novara, Novara 0–1 Virtus Entella.)	Qualification to relegation play-out
20	Novara (R)	42	10	14	18	42	52	−10	44	Relegation to Serie C
21	Pro Vercelli (R)	42	9	13	20	47	70	−23	40	Relegation to Serie C
22	Ternana (R)	42	7	16	19	62	77	−15	37	Relegation to Serie C

Source: Lega Serie B
Rules for classification: 1) Points; 2) Head-to-head points; 3) Head-to-head goal difference; 4) Goal difference; 5) Goals scored; 6) Draw.
(C) Champions; (D) Disqualified; (E) Eliminated; (O) Play-off winners; (P) Promoted; (R) Relegated

=== Serie C ===
Group A (North & Central West)
Pos	Team	Pld	Pts
1	Livorno (C, P)	36	68
2	Siena	36	67
3	Pisa	36	61
4	Monza	36	58
5	Viterbese	36	58
6	Alessandria	36	56
7	Carrarese	36	55
8	Piacenza	36	50
9	Giana Erminio	36	46
10	Pistoiese	36	46
11	Pontedera	36	46
12	Lucchese	36	44
13	Olbia	36	43
14	Pro Piacenza	36	41
15	Arzachena	36	39
16	Arezzo	36	39
17	Gavorrano (R)	36	34
18	Cuneo (O)	36	32
19	Prato (R)	36	26

Source: Livescore, lega-pro.com
(C) Champions;
(O) Play-off winners;
(P) Promoted;
(R) Relegated

Group B (North & Central East)
Pos	Team	Pld	Pts
1	Padova (C, P)	34	63
2	Südtirol	34	55
3	Sambenedettese	34	53
4	Reggiana	34	53
5	Albinoleffe	34	49
6	FeralpiSalò	34	49
7	Renate	34	48
8	Bassano Virtus	34	48
9	Pordenone	34	46
10	Mestre (R)	34	44
11	Triestina	34	43
12	Ravenna	34	43
13	Fano	34	38
14	Fermana	34	38
15	Gubbio	34	36
16	Teramo	34	35
17	Santarcangelo (R)	34	35
18	Vicenza (O)	34	32
19	Modena (D)	0	0

Source: Soccerway, lega-pro.com
(C) Champions;
(D) Disqualified;
(O) Play-off winners;
(P) Promoted;
(R) Relegated

Group C (South)
Pos	Team	Pld	Pts
1	Lecce (C, P)	36	74
2	Catania	36	70
3	Trapani	36	68
4	Juve Stabia	36	55
5	Cosenza (O, P)	36	54
6	Monopoli	36	53
7	Casertana	36	50
8	Rende	36	50
9	Virtus Francavilla	36	46
10	Sicula Leonzio	36	46
11	Bisceglie	36	45
12	Matera	36	42
13	Siracusa	36	42
14	Catanzaro	36	42
15	Reggina	36	41
16	Fidelis Andria	36	38
17	Paganese (O)	36	33
18	Fondi (R)	36	30
19	Akragas (R)	36	0

Source: Soccerway, lega-pro.com
(C) Champions;
(O) Play-off winners;
(P) Promoted;
(R) Relegated

== Cup competitions ==
=== Coppa Italia ===
==== Final ====
The final was played on 9 May 2018 at the Stadio Olimpico in Rome.

9 May 2018
21:00 CEST (UTC+2)

Juventus	4–0	Milan
Benatia 56', 64'; Douglas Costa 61'; Kalinić 76' (o.g.)	Report

Stadio Olimpico, Rome
Attendance: 64,983
Referee: Antonio Damato

=== Supercoppa Italiana ===
13 August 2017
20:45 CEST

Juventus	2–3	Lazio
Dybala 85', 90+1' (pen.)	Report	Immobile 32' (pen.), 54'; Murgia 90+3'

Stadio Olimpico, Rome
Attendance: 52,000
Referee: Davide Massa
