= 2019 FIFA Women's World Cup qualification – UEFA Group 6 =

Football tournament qualifying group

UEFA Group 6 of the 2019 FIFA Women's World Cup qualification competition consisted of five teams: Italy, Belgium, Romania, Portugal, and Moldova (which advanced from the preliminary round). The composition of the seven groups in the qualifying group stage was decided by the draw held on 25 April 2017, with the teams seeded according to their coefficient ranking.

The group was played in home-and-away round-robin format between 15 September 2017 and 4 September 2018. The group winners qualified for the final tournament, while the runners-up advanced to the play-offs if they were one of the four best runners-up among all seven groups (not counting results against the fifth-placed team).

== Standings ==
Pos	Team	Pld	W	D	L	GF	GA	GD	Pts	Qualification	Italy	Belgium	Portugal	Romania	Moldova
1	Italy	8	7	0	1	19	4	+15	21	2019 FIFA Women's World Cup	—	2–1	3–0	3–0	5–0
2	Belgium	8	6	1	1	28	6	+22	19	Play-offs	2–1	—	1–1	3–2	12–0
3	Portugal	8	3	2	3	22	8	+14	11		0–1	0–1	—	5–1	8–0
4	Romania	8	1	2	5	7	15	−8	5		0–1	0–1	1–1	—	3–1
5	Moldova	8	0	1	7	2	45	−43	1		1–3	0–7	0–7	0–0	—

Source: UEFA
Rules for classification: Qualification tiebreakers

== Matches ==
Times are CET/CEST, (Note: CEST (UTC+2) for dates between 26 March and 28 October 2017 and between 25 March and 27 October 2018, and CET (UTC+1) for all other dates.) as listed by UEFA (local times, if different, are in parentheses).

15 September 2017
20:30

Italy	5–0	Moldova
Sabatino 9'; Bonansea 22'; Girelli 33', 60'; Bergamaschi 38'	Report

Stadio Alberto Picco, La Spezia
Attendance: 650
Referee: Zuzana Kováčová (Slovakia)

19 September 2017
17:00 (18:00 EEST)

Romania	0–1	Italy
	Report	Corduneanu 77' (o.g.)

Stadionul Dr. Constantin Rădulescu, Cluj-Napoca
Attendance: 1,043
Referee: Monika Mularczyk (Poland)
19 September 2017
20:15

Belgium	12–0	Moldova
Cayman 3', 55', 60' (pen.), 70'; Wullaert 26', 29', 38'; Philtjens 35'; Deloose 62'; Vanmechelen 65'; De Caigny 69'; Colesnicenco 84' (o.g.)	Report

Den Dreef, Leuven
Attendance: 2,890
Referee: Eszter Urban (Hungary)

20 October 2017
20:30

Belgium	3–2	Romania
Cayman 30', 37'; Wullaert 87'	Report	Dușa 38'; Rus 53'

Den Dreef, Leuven
Attendance: 3,943
Referee: Marte Sørø (Norway)

24 October 2017
15:00

Italy	3–0	Romania
Girelli 51', 76'; Bonansea 78'	Report

Stadio Teofilo Patini, Castel di Sangro
Attendance: 530
Referee: Karolina Radzik-Johan (Poland)
24 October 2017
18:00 (17:00 WEST)

Portugal	0–1	Belgium
	Report	De Caigny 47'

Estádio Municipal 25 de Abril, Penafiel
Attendance: 4,136
Referee: Anastasia Pustovoitova (Russia)

24 November 2017
18:00 (17:00 WET)

Portugal	8–0	Moldova
Mendes 19'; Cușinova 32' (o.g.); Costa 47', 83'; Di. Silva 63'; Do. Silva 72' (pen.); Malho 79', 90+2'	Report

Estádio do Bonfim, Setúbal
Attendance: 3,283
Referee: Tanja Subotič (Slovenia)

28 November 2017
10:00 (11:00 EET)

Romania	3–1	Moldova
Voicu 27', 52'; Miron 59' (o.g.)	Report	Miron 51'

Stadionul Mogoșoaia, Mogoșoaia
Attendance: 250
Referee: Ivana Projkovska (Macedonia)
28 November 2017
18:00 (17:00 WET)

Portugal	0–1	Italy
	Report	Sabatino 37'

Estádio António Coimbra da Mota, Estoril
Attendance: 817
Referee: Marta Huerta De Aza (Spain)

6 April 2018
12:00 (13:00 EEST)

Moldova	1–3	Italy
Toma 43'	Report	Tucceri Cimini 8'; Colesnicenco 30' (o.g.); Giacinti 76'

Stadionul CPSM, Vadul lui Vodă
Attendance: 400
Referee: Shona Shukrula (Netherlands)
6 April 2018
19:30

Belgium	1–1	Portugal
De Caigny 90+1'	Report	Do. Silva 90+3' (pen.)

Den Dreef, Leuven
Attendance: 8,000
Referee: Esther Staubli (Switzerland)

10 April 2018
18:00

Italy	2–1	Belgium
Rosucci 42'; Girelli 80'	Report	Cayman 37' (pen.)

Stadio Paolo Mazza, Ferrara
Attendance: 7,500
Referee: Katalin Kulcsár (Hungary)
10 April 2018
18:00 (19:00 EEST)

Moldova	0–0	Romania
	Report

Zimbru Stadium, Chișinău
Attendance: 2,330
Referee: Vesna Budimir (Croatia)

8 June 2018
20:45

Italy	3–0	Portugal
Girelli 4'; Salvai 13'; Bonansea 90+1'	Report

Stadio Artemio Franchi, Florence
Attendance: 6,500
Referee: Pernilla Larsson (Sweden)

10 June 2018
18:00 (19:00 EEST)

Moldova	0–7	Belgium
	Report	Cayman 45', 88'; Velde 49'; Zeler 65'; Biesmans 77'; Colesnicenco 80' (o.g.); Wullaert 83' (pen.)

Zimbru Stadium, Chișinău
Attendance: 1,000
Referee: Marina Višnjić (Serbia)
12 June 2018
19:00 (20:00 EEST)

Romania	1–1	Portugal
Mihail 34'	Report	Norton 39'

Stadionul Municipal, Botoșani
Attendance: 3,175
Referee: Ewa Augustyn (Poland)

30 August 2018
18:00 (19:00 EEST)

Moldova	0–7	Portugal
	Report	Mendes 21'; Norton 35'; Malho 39', 41'; Di. Silva 85', 88'; Pinto 90+1'

Zimbru Stadium, Chișinău
Attendance: 540
Referee: Irena Velevačkoska (Macedonia)
31 August 2018
19:00 (20:00 EEST)

Romania	0–1	Belgium
	Report	van Kerkhoven 84'

Stadionul Municipal, Botoșani
Attendance: 3,867
Referee: Lina Lehtovaara (Finland)

4 September 2018
17:00

Belgium	2–1	Italy
Vanmechelen 6', 35'	Report	Girelli 30' (pen.)

Den Dreef, Leuven
Attendance: 2,758
Referee: Florence Guillemin (France)
4 September 2018
18:00 (17:00 WEST)

Portugal	5–1	Romania
Leite 30', 53'; Nagy 42' (o.g.); Di. Silva 59', 90'	Report	Bâtea 3'

Estádio Dr. Machado de Matos, Felgueiras
Attendance: 1,836
Referee: Gyöngyi Gaál (Hungary)

== Goalscorers ==
There were 78 goals scored in 20 matches, for an average of 3.9 goals per match.

9 goals

- (Belgium) Janice Cayman

7 goals

- (Italy) Cristiana Girelli

5 goals

- (Belgium) Tessa Wullaert
- (Portugal) Diana Silva

4 goals

- (Portugal) Vanessa Malho

3 goals

- (Belgium) Tine De Caigny
- (Belgium) Davinia Vanmechelen
- (Italy) Barbara Bonansea

2 goals

- (Italy) Daniela Sabatino
- (Portugal) Carole Costa
- (Portugal) Ana Leite
- (Portugal) Carolina Mendes
- (Portugal) Andreia Norton
- (Portugal) Dolores Silva
- (Romania) Andreea Voicu

1 goal

- (Belgium) Julie Biesmans
- (Belgium) Laura Deloose
- (Belgium) Davina Philtjens
- (Belgium) Ella van Kerkhoven
- (Belgium) Chloe Velde
- (Belgium) Aline Zeler
- (Italy) Valentina Bergamaschi
- (Italy) Linda Tucceri Cimini
- (Italy) Valentina Giacinti
- (Italy) Martina Rosucci
- (Italy) Cecilia Salvai
- (Moldova) Eugenia Miron
- (Moldova) Anastasia Toma
- (Portugal) Fátima Pinto
- (Romania) Mara Bâtea
- (Romania) Cosmina Dușa
- (Romania) Isabelle Mihail
- (Romania) Laura Rus

1 own goal

- (Moldova) Olga Cușinova (against Portugal)
- (Moldova) Eugenia Miron (against Romania)
- (Romania) Andreea Corduneanu (against Italy)
- (Romania) Melinda Nagy (against Portugal)

3 own goals

- (Moldova) Nadejda Colesnicenco (2 against Belgium, 1 against Italy)
