= Jesper Fredberg =

Danish football coach and executive (born 1981)

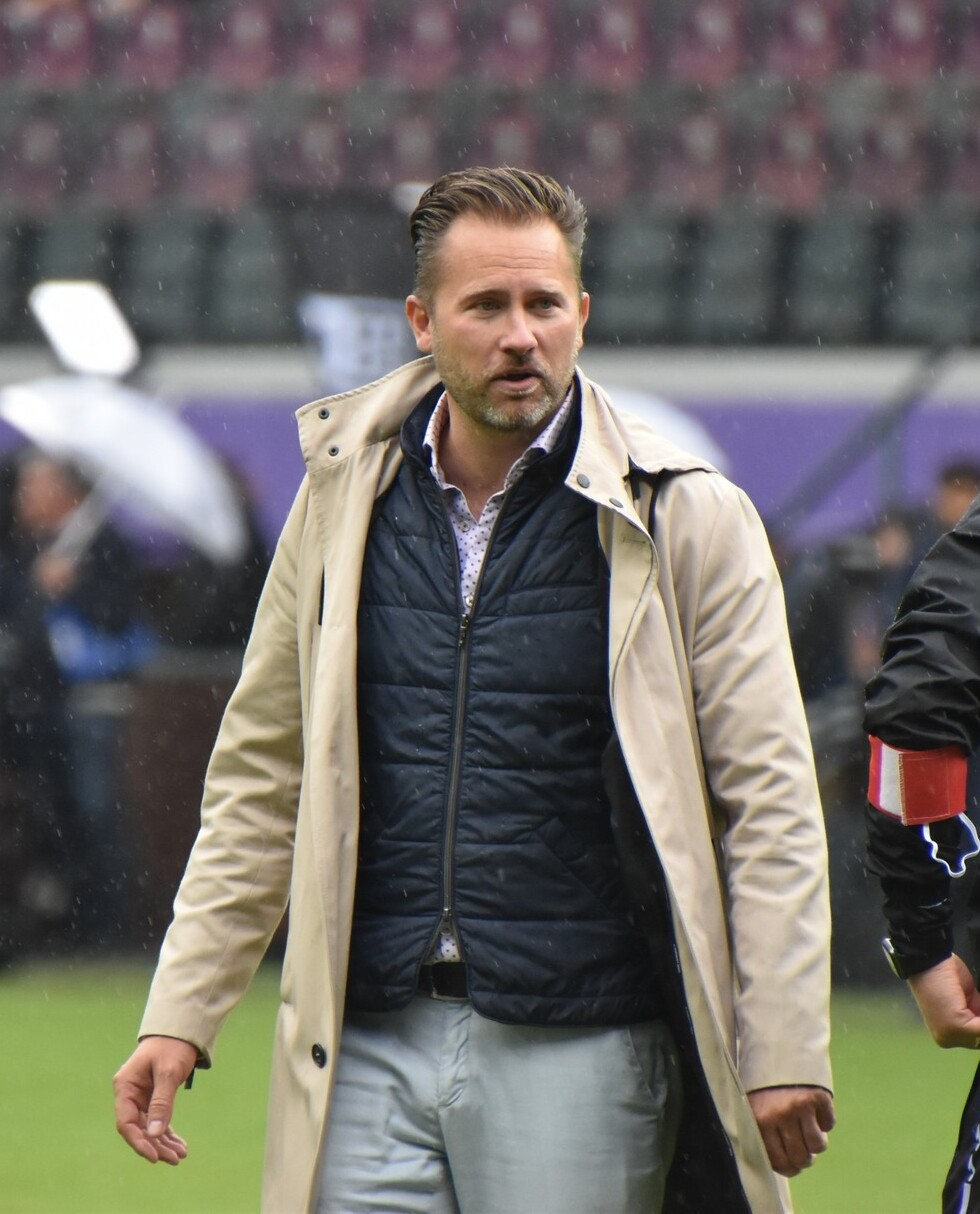
- Fredberg with Anderlecht in 2023

Personal information
- Date of birth: 11 May 1981 (age 45)
- Place of birth: Aarhus, Denmark
- Position: Centre-back

Team information
- Current team: Sampdoria (CEO football)

Managerial career
- Years: Team
- 2014: AGF (caretaker)
- 2018: Omonia Nicosia

Jesper Fredberg (born 11 May 1981) is a Danish football executive who is CEO of the football area at Serie B club Sampdoria.

Fredberg worked in a succession of roles at AGF, including a spell as head coach in 2014, before leaving Denmark in 2016 for Omonia Nicosia, where he was technical director and twice took temporary charge of the first team. After a year at Panathinaikos he returned to Denmark as sporting director of Viborg FF, whom he took from the Danish 1st Division to the top half of the Superliga. He was CEO Sports at Anderlecht from 2022 to 2024 and joined Sampdoria in July 2025.

== Early years ==
Fredberg was born in Aarhus. He began coaching young, describing himself as one of the youngest professional coaches in Danish football, and held a number of posts at AGF over several years, as an assistant, as head of the academy and as head coach. He took charge of the first team in 2014 following the dismissal of Peter Sørensen, a spring that ended in relegation to the Danish 1st Division.

== Executive career ==
=== Omonia Nicosia and Panathinaikos ===
Fredberg left Denmark in 2016, working as a consultant for the Belgian analysis firm Double Pass and becoming technical director of the Cypriot club Omonia Nicosia. He assisted the caretaker manager Akis Ioakim at the end of the 2016–17 season, and in March 2018 replaced Ivaylo Petev as caretaker for the last seven matches of the 2017–18 Cypriot First Division season.

In November 2018 he joined Panathinaikos as head of coaching, rejoining the technical director Nikos Dabizas, with whom he had worked in Cyprus.

=== Viborg FF ===
Fredberg returned to Denmark in May 2019 as sporting director of Viborg FF, then in the 1st Division, with overall responsibility for the first team and the academy. He led the club back to the Superliga, and in 2021 signed a contract extension to the summer of 2024. Under his direction Viborg rose as high as second in the Superliga during the 2022–23 winter break, and Sampdoria later described him as having taken the club from the Danish second tier to competing for the title and for European qualification. Managing director Morten Jensen said that Fredberg had inspired the club to think bigger.

=== Anderlecht ===
Anderlecht appointed Fredberg as CEO Sports in November 2022, with the club rebuilding after the departures of Vincent Kompany and Felice Mazzù. He took up the post at the turn of the year and appointed a fellow Dane, Brian Riemer, as head coach. Anderlecht were 11th when the two arrived and finished there, the club's lowest placing since the 1930s. They improved to third in 2024, going into the final day with a chance of the title, and that summer Fredberg turned down an approach from Copenhagen.

Riemer was dismissed in September 2024, after a defeat by leaders Genk that would have taken Anderlecht top, and with his successor David Hubert having won one of his first five league matches, Fredberg himself left on 30 October 2024, replaced by Olivier Renard. Chairman Wouter Vandenhaute said that a difficult transfer summer had put pressure on the relationship.

=== Sampdoria ===
On 13 July 2025, Sampdoria announced Fredberg as CEO of its newly created football area, a post separate from the club's administrative management, alongside the head coach Massimo Donati and the sporting director Andrea Mancini. President Matteo Manfredi called him one of the most innovative executives in European football. Fredberg said that the club's academy would be central to his work and that recruitment would be more careful than in previous years, with a budget available but a clear and sustainable playing philosophy the priority.

Donati was dismissed on 18 October 2025 with the club third from bottom. Fredberg said that the decision was a defeat for everyone rather than for the coach alone, that it had been taken on results, and that it had not been determined by an algorithm. Angelo Gregucci was appointed in his place alongside Salvatore Foti. In March 2026 the FIGC's national federal tribunal found that Gregucci had signed as head coach without performing the role, allowing Foti, who lacked the necessary licence, to act as the responsible coach; it banned both for ten matches, fined Sampdoria €5,000 and imposed two-month bans from football activity on Manfredi and Fredberg.

Gregucci and Foti were dismissed on 9 March 2026 and Attilio Lombardo took temporary charge, Sampdoria finishing 13th in Serie B. Lombardo was not retained as head coach for 2026–27, and Bernardo Corradi was appointed, with Américo Branco as sporting director. Supporters protested against Fredberg during the closing weeks of the season.

== Managerial statistics ==
As of matches played on 13 May 2018

Managerial record by team and tenure
Team	Nat	From	To	Record								Ref
Team	Nat	From	To	G	W	D	L	GF	GA	GD	Win %	Ref
AGF	(Denmark)	27 February 2014	30 June 2014	14	3	0	11	12	26	−14	21.43	
Omonia Nicosia	(Cyprus)	21 March 2018	31 May 2018	7	1	0	6	5	15	−10	14.29	
Career total				21	4	0	17	17	41	−24	19.05	—
