= Laura Deloose =

Belgian footballer

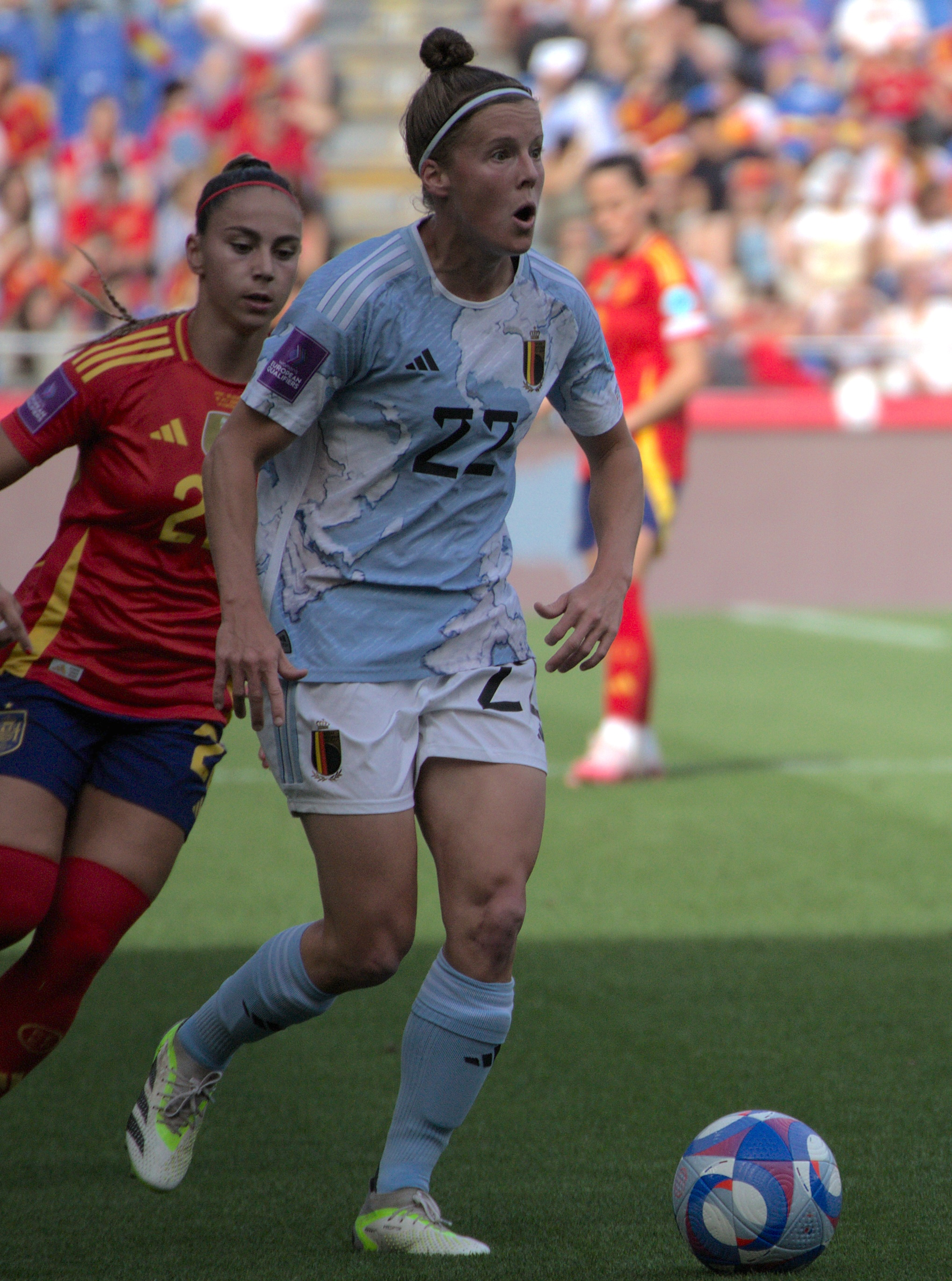
- Deloose (blue number 22) in 2024

Personal information
- Full name: Laura Deloose
- Date of birth: 18 June 1993 (age 33)
- Place of birth: Bornem, Belgium
- Height: 1.66 m (5 ft 5 1/2 in)
- Position: Defender

Team information
- Current team: Anderlecht
- Number: 14

Senior career*
Years	Team	Apps	(Gls)
2012–	Anderlecht	92	(8)

International career^{‡}
2015–	Belgium	97	(4)
- * Club domestic league appearances and goals as of 00:55, 11 September 2022 (UTC) ‡ National team caps and goals as of 5 December 2024

Laura Deloose (born 18 June 1993) is a Belgian footballer who plays for Anderlecht and the Belgium national team.

== Club career ==
Deloose has won seven league titles in a row with Anderlecht, sweeping the Belgian Women's Super League from the 2017–18 season right through to 2023–24.

She also won the Belgian Cup with Anderlecht in 2022.

== International career ==
Deloose has played for Belgium at two editions of the UEFA Women's Championship – their debut competition at UEFA Women's Euro 2017 where the Red Flames were knocked out in the group stage, and again at UEFA Women's Euro 2022 in England, where Belgium were beaten in the quarter-finals 1–0 by Sweden.

At the start of 2022, Deloose helped Belgium win the Pinatar Cup in Spain for the first time, beating Russia on penalties in the final after a 0–0 draw.

She went on to contribute to Belgium's successful qualification for UEFA Women's Euro 2025 via the play-offs, coming on as sub in the second leg of the play-off final against Ukraine on 3 December 2024.

On 11 June 2025, Deloose was called up to the Belgium squad for the UEFA Women's Euro 2025.

== Career statistics ==
=== International ===
As of match played 26 October 2021

List of international goals scored by Laura Deloose
No.	Date	Venue	Opponent	Score	Result	Competition
1	15 September 2016	Sports Center Of Fa Of Serbia, Stara Pazova, Serbia	Serbia	1-2	1-3	UEFA Women's Euro 2017 qualification
2	20 October 2016	Proximus Basecamp, Tubize, Belgium	Russia	2-0	3-0	Friendly
3	19 September 2017	Den Dreef, Leuven, Belgium	Moldova	9-0	12-0	2019 FIFA Women's World Cup qualification
4	3 September 2019	Den Dreef, Leuven, Belgium	Croatia	5–0	6–1	UEFA Women's Euro 2022 qualifying

== Honours ==
Anderlecht

- Belgian Women's Super League: 2017–18, 2018–19, 2019–20, 2020–21, 2021–22, 2022–23, 2023–24
- Belgian Women's Cup: 2022

Belgium

- Pinatar Cup: 2022

== See also ==
- List of women's footballers with 100 or more international caps
