= Andreia Norton =

Portuguese footballer (born 1996)

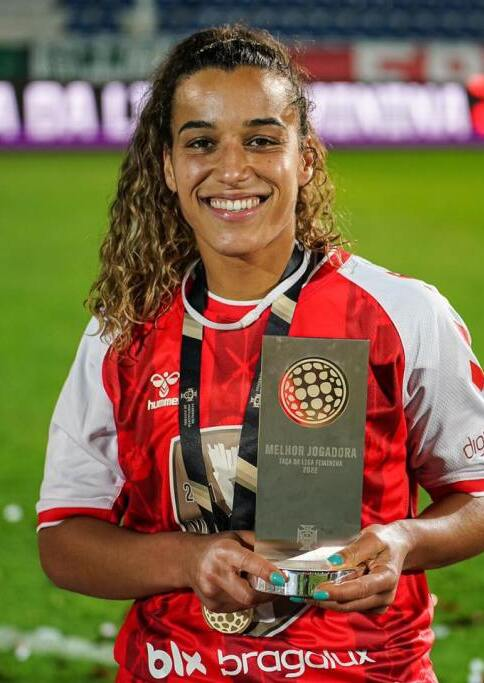
- Norton with Braga in 2022

Personal information
- Full name: Andreia Alexandra Norton
- Date of birth: 15 August 1996 (age 30)
- Place of birth: Ovar, Portugal
- Height: 1.60 m (5 ft 3 in)
- Position: Midfielder

Team information
- Current team: Benfica
- Number: 17

Youth career
- 2003–2008: Clube Desportivo Furadouro

Senior career*
Years	Team	Apps	(Gls)
2009–2010	U.D. Oliveirense		
2010–2013	F.C. Cesarense	23	(13)
2013–2015	Clube de Albergaria	1	(1)
2015–2016	FC Barcelona	0	(0)
2016–2018	Braga	33	(17)
2018–2019	SC Sand	11	(0)
2019–2020	Inter Milan	5	(0)
2020–2022	Braga	45	(12)
2022–	Benfica	64	(4)

International career^{‡}
2012–2015	Portugal U19	25	(9)
2016–	Portugal	98	(5)
- * Club domestic league appearances and goals as of 14 June 2025 ‡ National team caps and goals as of 14 June 2025

Andreia Alexandra Norton (born 15 August 1996) is a Portuguese footballer who plays as a midfielder for Benfica in the Campeonato Nacional Feminino. She first played for her country in an under nineteen match in 2012 and debuted for the senior team four years later.

== Club career ==
Norton started to play football at the age of two in her native city. When Norton was seven, she went to play for the "Furadouro Sports Club", an amateur club in Ovar, where she was the only girl in the team. She used to play as a defender, then she started to play in the midfield and finally settled down as a forward. At the age of 12, she was forced to leave the team, because Portuguese law forbids mixed teams above the age of 12. In 2009, aged 13, Norton went to play for U.D. Oliveirense, at that time a team playing in the Portuguese First Division. Due to her young age she only played a few matches, but scored a goal against Leixões S.C. U.D. Oliveirense was relegated that season, and later folded. Like most players from Oliveirense, she went to F.C. Cesarense, where she spent three years. In 2013, Norton signed with Clube de Albergaria. There, she was twice voted the league's best player, at 17 and 18 years of age.

In 2015, Norton was offered a contract with FC Barcelona. In one of the final matches of the season, against Club de Albergaria, she suffered a serious injury in her left knee, which forced her to undergo surgery twice. As the contract with Barcelona was already signed, she went to Catalonia but was unable to play any matches for the club. After one year in Spain, she decided to return to Portugal and signed with S.C. Braga in order to get more playing time and therefore recover her previous form. On 19 March 2018 Norton was included by the "Quinas de Ouro" award among the "11 Best Players" in the Portuguese women's league. The award is annually organized by the Portuguese Football Federation together with the "Associação Nacional dos Treinadores de Futebol" and the "Sindicato dos Jogadores Profissionais de Futebol".

In May 2018, German Frauen-Bundesliga club SC Sand announced that they had signed Norton.

In August 2019, Italian club Inter Milan announced that they had signed Norton.

On 13 February 2020 Portuguese club Sporting Clube de Braga announced the come back of Norton after her departure in 2018 after 2 years in the Portuguese club.

On 1 July 2022 Portuguese club Sport Lisboa e Benfica announced the signing of Norton with a contract until 2025.

== International career ==
Norton debuted for Portugal U19 in a match against Wales U19 on 13 March 2012. She was part of the team that reached the semi-finals in the 2012 UEFA Women's Under-19 Championship, when they lost 1–0 against Spain in the semi-finals. Norton played with the U19 team until 2015, recording 25 caps with nine goals scored. On 15 October 2016, at the age of 20, Norton debuted for the Portuguese senior team in a tie against Romania. In her debut she scored the goal that enabled Portugal to qualify for a European Women's Championship for the first time. On 6 July 2017 Francisco Neto asked Norton to represent Portugal at the UEFA Women's Euro 2017. She did not play any matches as Portugal was eliminated in the group stage. On 30 May 2023, she was included in the 23-player squad for the FIFA Women's World Cup 2023.

On 24 June 2025, Norton was called up to the Portugal squad for the UEFA Women's Euro 2025.

== International goals ==
No.	Date	Venue	Opponent	Score	Result	Competition
1.	25 October 2016	Stadionul Dr. Constantin Rădulescu, Cluj-Napoca, Romania	Romania	1–0	1–1 (a.e.t.)	UEFA Women's Euro 2017 qualifying play-offs
2.	12 June 2018	Stadionul Municipal, Botoșani, Romania	Romania	1–1	1–1	2019 FIFA Women's World Cup qualification
3.	30 August 2018	Zimbru Stadium, Chișinău, Moldova	Moldova	2–0	7–0	2019 FIFA Women's World Cup qualification
4.	4 March 2019	VRS António Sports Complex, Vila Real de Santo António, Portugal	Switzerland	1–0	1–3	2019 Algarve Cup
5.	4 June 2024	Mourneview Park, Lurgan, Northern Ireland	Northern Ireland	2–1	2–1	UEFA Women's Euro 2025 qualifying

== Personal life ==
Norton is the daughter of journeyman Brazilian footballer, Valdecir Ribeiro da Silva (known as "Pingo"), who played for A.D. Ovarense in the 1995/1996 season. She never met her father, and was raised by her grandmother, aunt, and uncle.

== Honours ==
Benfica

- Campeonato Nacional Feminino: 2022–23, 2023–24, 2024–25, 2025–26
- Taça de Portugal: 2023–24, 2025–26
- Taça da Liga: 2022–23, 2023–24, 2024–25
- Supertaça de Portugal: 2022, 2023

Braga

- Taça de Portugal: 2019–20
- Taça da Liga: 2021–22
