= Pingo (footballer, born 1973) =

Brazilian association football player

Personal information
- Full name: Valdecir Ribeiro da Silva
- Date of birth: 27 October 1973 (age 53)
- Place of birth: Duque de Caxias, Rio de Janeiro, Brazil
- Height: 1.78 m (5 ft 10 in)
- Position: Midfielder

Youth career
- 1991: Serrano
- 1992: Flamengo

Senior career*
Years	Team	Apps	(Gls)
1993	Serrano		
1994–1995	Torreense	11	(0)
1995–1996	Ovarense	18	(1)
1996	União Montemor	7	(0)
1997	Londrina		
1998	Estrela do Norte		
1999	Fluminense de Feira		
1999	Olaria		
2000–2002	Fluminense de Feira		
2002	Bahia	1	(0)
2003	Fluminense de Feira		
2003	Grêmio Maringá		
2007–2009	Duque de Caxias		
2009	Bréscia		
2012	Estrela do Norte		
- * Club domestic league appearances and goals as of 14:42, 28 December 2018 (UTC)

Valdecir Ribeiro da Silva (born 27 October 1973), commonly known as Pingo, is a Brazilian former footballer. In his playing days, he was a defensive midfielder for several professional clubs in Brazil and Portugal.

In June 2002, he signed for Campeonato Brasileiro Série A club Esporte Clube Bahia. His daughter Andreia Norton is a footballer for the Portugal women's national football team.
