= Olivier Renard =

Belgian footballer and sporting director

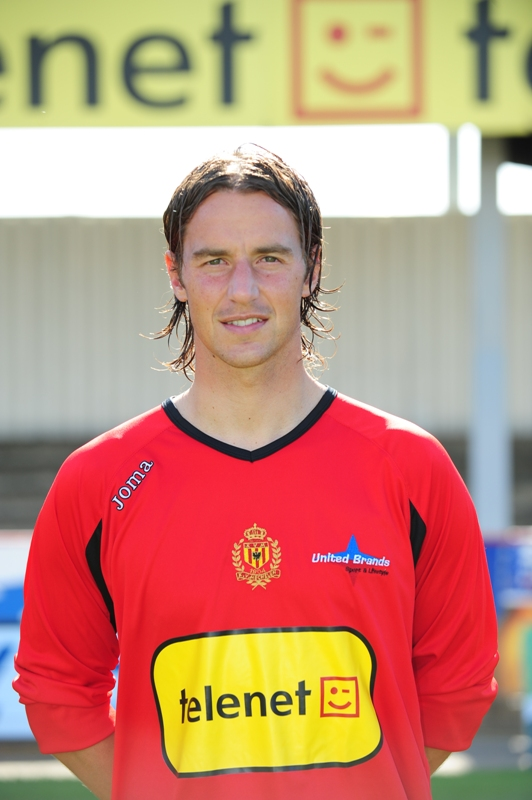

Personal information
- Date of birth: 24 May 1979 (age 47)
- Place of birth: Haine-Saint-Paul, Belgium
- Height: 1.92 m (6 ft 4 in)
- Position: Goalkeeper

Senior career*
Years	Team	Apps	(Gls)
1996–1999	Charleroi	5	(0)
1999–2005	Udinese	0	(0)
2000–2001	→ Charleroi (loan)	8	(0)
2004	→ Modena (loan)	6	(0)
2005	→ Napoli (loan)	2	(0)
2005–2008	Standard Liège	40	(0)
2007–2008	→ Mechelen (loan)	17	(0)
2008–2013	Mechelen	119	(0)
2013	→ Charleroi (loan)	0	(0)

International career
1997	Belgium U18	4	(0)
1997–1998	Belgium U19	13	(0)
2000–2002	Belgium U21	8	(0)
- * Club domestic league appearances and goals

Olivier Renard (born 24 May 1979) is a Belgian former professional football goalkeeper who last worked as sporting director for Anderlecht.

== Club career ==
Born in Haine-Saint-Paul in the city of La Louvière, Renard started his playing career as professional with Charleroi in 1996, moving to Udinese in 1999, but in six years at the Serie A club, never played once for them in the league, being loaned out to Charleroi again, Modena and Napoli.

Renard returned to Belgium with Standard Liège, playing 40 times for the Rouches across the next two seasons, moving to Mechelen on loan during the 2007-08 season, making the move permanent the following year. Renard featured for Standard during their Championship-winning season of 2007-08. After five years at Achter de Kazerne, Renard announced his retirement at the age of 34.

In the 2007–2008 season he finished runner-up to youngster Kenny Steppe for the Goalkeeper of the Year Award.

== International career ==
Renard featured in Belgium squads at the 1997 FIFA World Youth Championship and the 2002 UEFA European Under-21 Football Championship where he was second goalkeeper behind Jean-François Gillet.

Together with Carl Hoefkens, Tom Caluwé, Cédric Roussel and Gillet, Renard went on to be called up for the Belgian national team.

First selected in 2008 by René Vandereycken, Renard was called-up 11 times for the Belgian national squad as understudy for Stijn Stijnen, but never got on the pitch. Contemporaries Brian Vandenbussche and Davy Schollen in contrast did end up playing for the Red Devils. After Stijnen finished playing for Belgium, Renard's chance was lost through suffering a number of injuries, with Gillet, Thibaut Courtois and Simon Mignolet becoming regular starters, sending Renard down to fourth-in-line.

In May 2012, he was selected for the last time in his professional career by national coach Marc Wilmots.

== Managerial career ==
Having finished his playing career there, Renard was appointed KV Mechelen sporting director in January 2014. He left the club in February 2016, to join Standard Liège, still as sporting director. From the summer 2018, he became the head of scouting instead of sporting director. He left the club by mutual consent on 20 May 2019.

In June 2019, he was hired as a sports consultant at Royal Antwerp. He left the club again on 29 September 2019, where it was announced that Renard had signed with Major League Soccer club Montreal Impact, now CF Montréal, as the sporting director.

On 9 June 2022 CF Montréal elevated Olivier Renard to vice president and chief sporting officer in a new agreement for an indefinite period. Rather than signing a new contract, Renard was made a permanent employee of the club. He left in May 2024.

On 30 October 2024, Renard returned to Belgium after five years away, being named Sporting Director at Anderlecht, succeeding Sports CEO Jesper Fredberg.

== Controversies ==
Renard's name emerged in relation to the Operation Clean Hands investigation into Belgian football, in connection with his time at Standard Liege. Renard denied all allegations, and has yet to be charged in relation to the probe.

== Honours ==
Standard Liège

- Belgian Pro League: 2007–08, runner-up 2005–06
- Belgian Cup: 2006–07 runner-up

KV Mechelen

- Belgian Cup: 2008-09 runner-up

Individual

- Goalkeeper of the Year Award: 2007-08 runner-up
