= Linda Tucceri Cimini =

Italian footballer (born 1991)

Personal information
- Date of birth: 4 April 1991 (age 35)
- Place of birth: Avezzano, Italy
- Height: 1.60 m (5 ft 3 in)
- Position: Left midfielder

Team information
- Current team: Bologna
- Number: 28

Senior career*
Years	Team	Apps	(Gls)
2011–2013	Riviera di Romagna	46	(4)
2013–2014	Torres Calcio	27	(1)
2014–2015	Riviera di Romagna	21	(7)
2015–2018	San Zaccaria	59	(8)
2018–2022	AC Milan	81	(8)
2023–2024	Fiorentina	5	(0)
2024–2025	Sampdoria	6	(0)
2025	-> Bologna (loan)	16	(2)
2025–	Bologna	0	(0)

International career^{‡}
2016–2020	Italy	20	(1)
- * Club domestic league appearances and goals as of 25 February 2023 ‡ National team caps and goals as of 27 October 2020

Linda Tucceri Cimini (born 4 April 1991) is an Italian professional footballer who plays as a left midfielder for Bologna and the Italy women's national team.

Tucceri Cimini played for Italy at UEFA Women's Euro 2017.

== International goals ==
No.	Date	Venue	Opponent	Score	Result	Competition
1.	6 April 2018	Stadionul CPSM, Vadul lui Vodă, Moldova	Moldova	1–0	3–1	2019 FIFA Women's World Cup qualification
