= UC Sampdoria (women) =

Women's association football club from Italy

Sampdoria
- Full name: Unione Calcio Sampdoria S.p.A.
- Nicknames: I Blucerchiati (The Blue-circled); La Samp; Il Doria
- Founded: 2020; 6 years ago
- Chairman: Matteo Manfredi
- Head coach: Stefano Castiglione
- League: Serie B
- 2024–25: Serie A, 10th of 10 (relegated)
- Website: https://www.sampdoria.it/en/

Unione Calcio Sampdoria (Italian pronunciation: [sampˈdɔːrja, sanˈdɔːrja]) colloquially known as Sampdoria, is a professional women's football club based in Genoa, Liguria. The club plays in Serie B, the second tier of Italian football.

== History ==
After starting its activity at youth levels, the team was granted the access to play the women's Eccellenza (fourth tier of Italian women's football). In their first season, Sampdoria were in the second position and lost the final of the promotion-play offs. The club was established on 15 June 2021 by acquiring the sports title of a San Gimignano-based team Florentia San Gimignano S.S.D. playing in Serie A. On 7 July 2021, Antonio Cincotta was hired as team coach. Sampdoria's first Serie A match was on 29 August when they won 2–1 against Lazio, Ana Lucía Martínez e Yoreli Rincón were the first two goalscorer of Sampdoria's history. The first Sampdoria president was Massimo Ferrero. However, after his arrest in December 2021, Marco Lanna became the new president of the company.

== Managerial history ==
Below is a list of Sampdoria Women coaches from 2020 until the present day.

Name	Nationality	Years
Enrico Calvi	Italy	2020–2021
Antonio Cincotta	Italy	2021–2023
Salvatore Mango	Italy	2023–2024
Gian Loris Rossi	Italy	2024
Davide Corti	Italy	2024
Stefano Castiglione	Italy	2024-

== Presidential history ==
Below is a list of Sampdoria Women presidents from 2020 until the present day.

Name	Nationality	Years
Massimo Ferrero	Italy	2020–2021
Marco Lanna	Italy	2022–2024
Matteo Manfredi	Italy	2024-

== Players ==
=== Current squad ===
As of 18 November 2024

Note: Flags indicate national team as defined under FIFA eligibility rules; some limited exceptions apply. Players may hold more than one non-FIFA nationality.

No.	Pos.	Nation	Player
1	GK	ITA	Amanda Tampieri
2	DF	ITA	Vanessa Panzeri
3	DF	ITA	Maria Vittoria Nano
5	MF	ITA	Norma Cinotti
6	MF	FRA	Alice Benoît
7	FW	ITA	Nicole Arcangeli
8	MF	NZL	Kiara Bercelli
9	FW	ITA	Tori DellaPeruta
11	DF	FIN	Nora Heroum
14	MF	ITA	Giada Cimò
18	FW	ITA	Giada Burbassi

No.	Pos.	Nation	Player
19	MF	ITA	Valentina Farhang
21	MF	ITA	Cecilia Re
23	DF	ITA	Elena Pisani
24	FW	ITA	Sara Baldi
26	DF	ITA	Sofia Bertucci
27	FW	ITA	Stefania Tarenzi (captain)
28	DF	ITA	Nicole Lazzeri
35	DF	ITA	Elisa Zilli
36	GK	ITA	Sabrina Nespolo
40	MF	ITA	Bianca Fallico
99	FW	ITA	Giulia Bison

== See also ==
- List of women's football clubs in Italy
