= Stefania Tarenzi =

Italian footballer (born 1988)

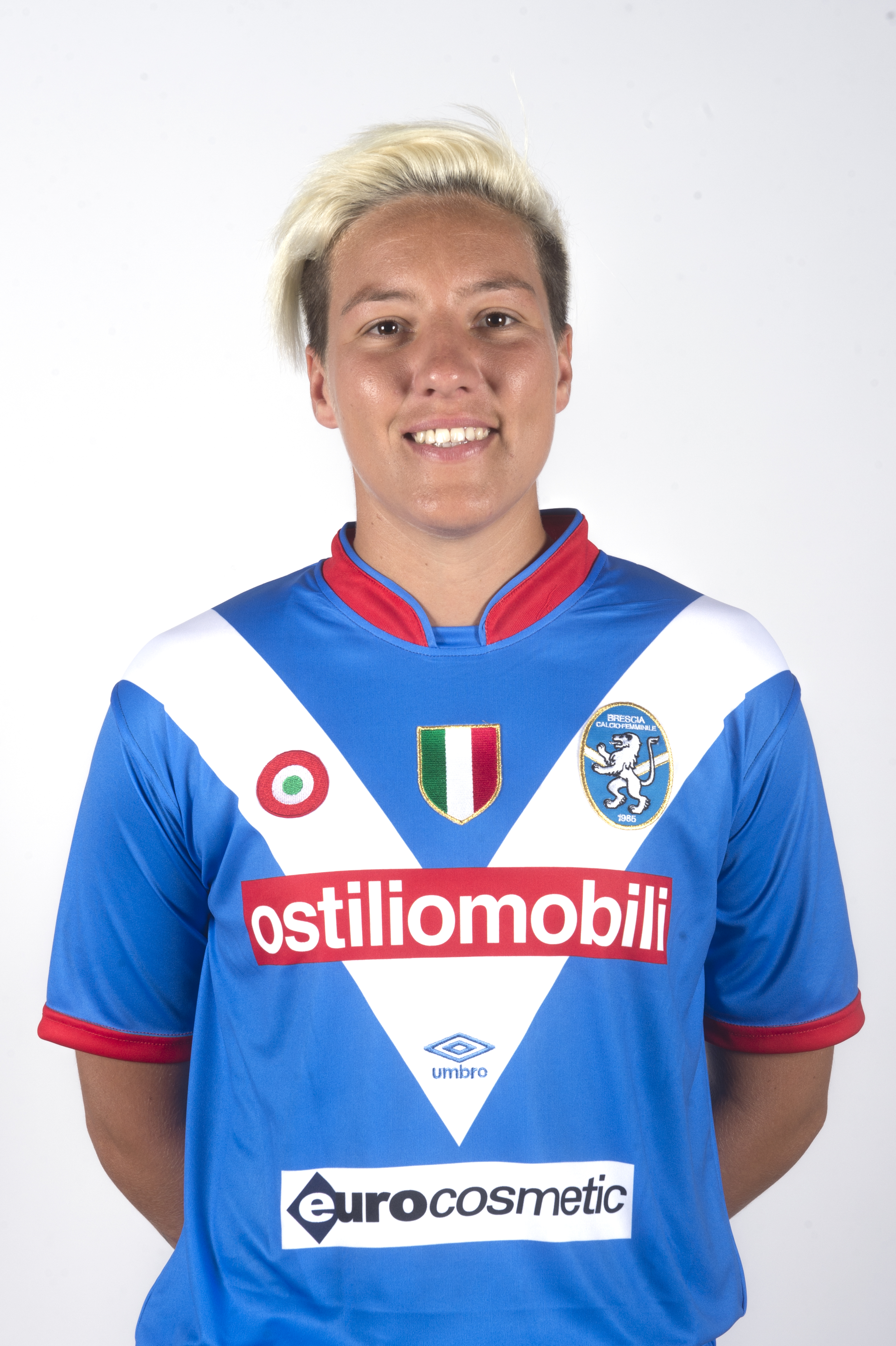

Personal information
- Date of birth: 29 February 1988 (age 38)
- Place of birth: Gavardo, Italy
- Height: 1.70 m (5 ft 7 in)
- Position: Striker

Senior career*
Years	Team	Apps	(Gls)
2013–2017	Brescia	81	(36)
2017–2018	Sassuolo	19	(7)
2018–2019	ChievoVerona Valpo	20	(13)
2019–2021	Inter Milan	36	(12)
2021–2025	Sampdoria	55	(10)
2025–2026	Vicenza	2	(0)

International career
2015–2021	Italy	14	(2)
- * Club domestic league appearances and goals as of 28 August 2022

Stefania Tarenzi (born 29 February 1988) is an Italian former professional footballer who played as a striker.
