= Olga Cușinova =

Moldovan footballer

Personal information
- Date of birth: 14 December 1985 (age 40)
- Position: Defender

International career^{‡}
Years	Team	Apps	(Gls)
- Moldova
- ‡ National team caps and goals as of 19:45, 30 August 2019 (UTC)

Olga Cușinova (born 14 December 1985) is a Moldovan footballer who plays as a defender and has appeared for the Moldova women's national team.

== Career ==
Cușinova has been capped for the Moldova national team, appearing for the team during the 2019 FIFA Women's World Cup qualifying cycle.
