= Melinda Nagy =

Romanian footballer (born 2000)

Personal information
- Date of birth: 4 February 2000 (age 26)
- Position: Defender

Team information
- Current team: Olimpia Cluj

Senior career*
Years	Team	Apps	(Gls)
- Olimpia Cluj

International career^{‡}
- Romania
- * Club domestic league appearances and goals as of 19:48, 30 August 2019 (UTC) ‡ National team caps and goals as of 19:48, 30 August 2019 (UTC)

Melinda Nagy (born 4 February 2000) is a Romanian footballer who plays as a defender and has appeared for the Romania women's national team.

== Career ==
Nagy has been capped for the Romania national team, appearing for the team during the 2019 FIFA Women's World Cup qualifying cycle.
