= Isabelle Mihail =

Romanian footballer (born 1999)

Personal information
- Date of birth: 8 February 1999 (age 27)
- Place of birth: Kitchener, Ontario, Canada
- Height: 1.70 m (5 ft 7 in)
- Position: Forward

Youth career
- Kitchener Waterloo

College career
| Years | Team | Apps | (Gls) |
| 2017–2021 | Kent State Golden Flashes | | |

International career
- Romania

Isabelle Mihail (born 8 February 1999) is a Romanian-Canadian former footballer who played as a forward and has appeared for the Romania women's national team.

== Career ==
Mihail has been capped for the Romania national team, appearing for the team during the 2019 FIFA Women's World Cup qualifying cycle.
