= Davinia Vanmechelen =

Belgian footballer

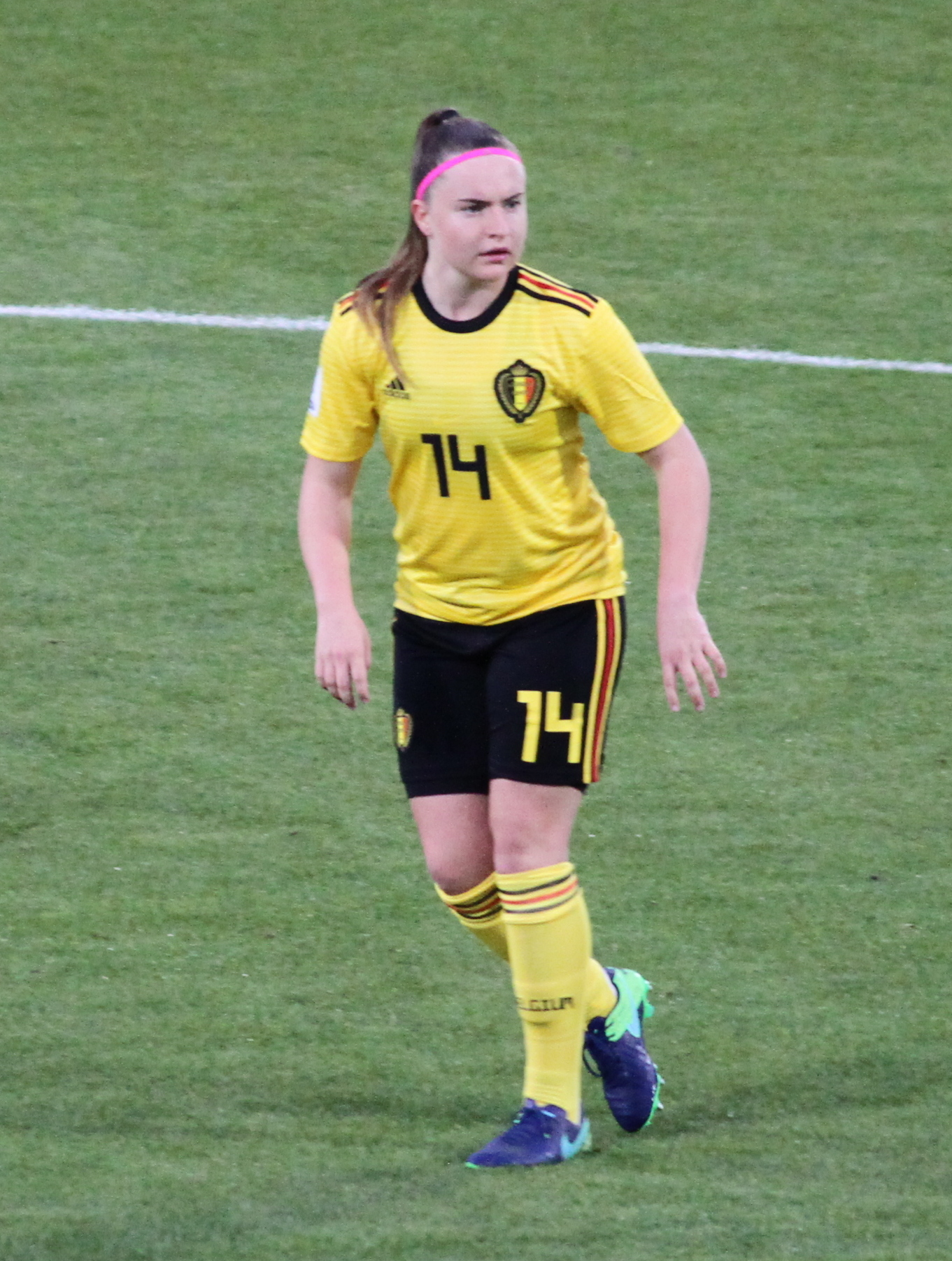
- Vanmechelen in 2018

Personal information
- Full name: Davinia Vanmechelen
- Date of birth: 30 August 1999 (age 27)
- Place of birth: Sint-Truiden, Belgium
- Height: 1.64 m (5 ft 5 in)
- Position: Forward

Team information
- Current team: Standard Liège

Senior career*
Years	Team	Apps	(Gls)
2015–2017	Standard Liège		
2017–2018	KRC Genk		
2018–2019	Paris Saint-Germain	1	(0)
2019	→ PSV (loan)	8	(0)
2019–2020	Twente	10	(1)
2020–2022	Standard Liège	48	(23)
2022–2026	Club YLA	62	(40)
2025–2026	→ Napoli (loan)	9	(1)
2026–	Standard Liège	0	(0)

International career^{‡}
2014	Belgium U15	1	(0)
2014–2015	Belgium U16	5	(2)
2014–2016	Belgium U17	14	(9)
2016–2017	Belgium U19	8	(0)
2019	Belgium U21	1	(0)
2016–	Belgium	50	(10)
- * Club domestic league appearances and goals as of 1 September 2026 ‡ National team caps and goals as of 8 October 2022

Davinia Vanmechelen (born 30 August 1999) is a Belgian professional footballer who plays as a forward for Belgian Women's Super League (BWSL) club Standard Liège, and the Belgium women's national football team.

== Career statistics ==
=== International ===
As of match played 6 October 2022

Belgium
Year	Apps	Goals
2016	2	1
2017	14	3
2018	9	2
2019	7	1
2020	4	0
2021	8	0
2022	6	3
Total	50	10

List of international goals scored by Davinia Vanmechelen
No.	Date	Venue	Opponent	Score	Result	Competition
1	28 November 2016	Stade Leburton, Tubize, Belgium	Denmark	1–2	1–3	Friendly
2	19 January 2017	CNFE Clairefontaine, Clairefontaine-en-Yvelines, France	France	0–1	1–2	Friendly
3	6 March 2017	Makario Stadium, Nicosia, Cyprus	North Korea	3–1	4–1	Friendly
4	19 September 2017	Den Dreef, Leuven, Belgium	Moldova	10–0	12–0	2019 FIFA Women's World Cup qualification
5	4 September 2018	Den Dreef, Leuven, Belgium	Italy	1–0	2–1	2019 FIFA Women's World Cup qualification
6	4 September 2018	Den Dreef, Leuven, Belgium	Italy	2–1	2–1	2019 FIFA Women's World Cup qualification
7	3 September 2019	Den Dreef, Leuven, Belgium	Croatia	6–0	6–1	UEFA Women's Euro 2022 qualifying
8	28 June 2022	Herman Vanderpoortenstadion, Lier, Belgium	Luxembourg	1–0	6–1	Friendly
9	28 June 2022	Herman Vanderpoortenstadion, Lier, Belgium	Luxembourg	2–1	6–1	Friendly
10	28 June 2022	Herman Vanderpoortenstadion, Lier, Belgium	Luxembourg	4–1	6–1	Friendly
