= Matteo Manfredi =

Italian financier and entrepreneur

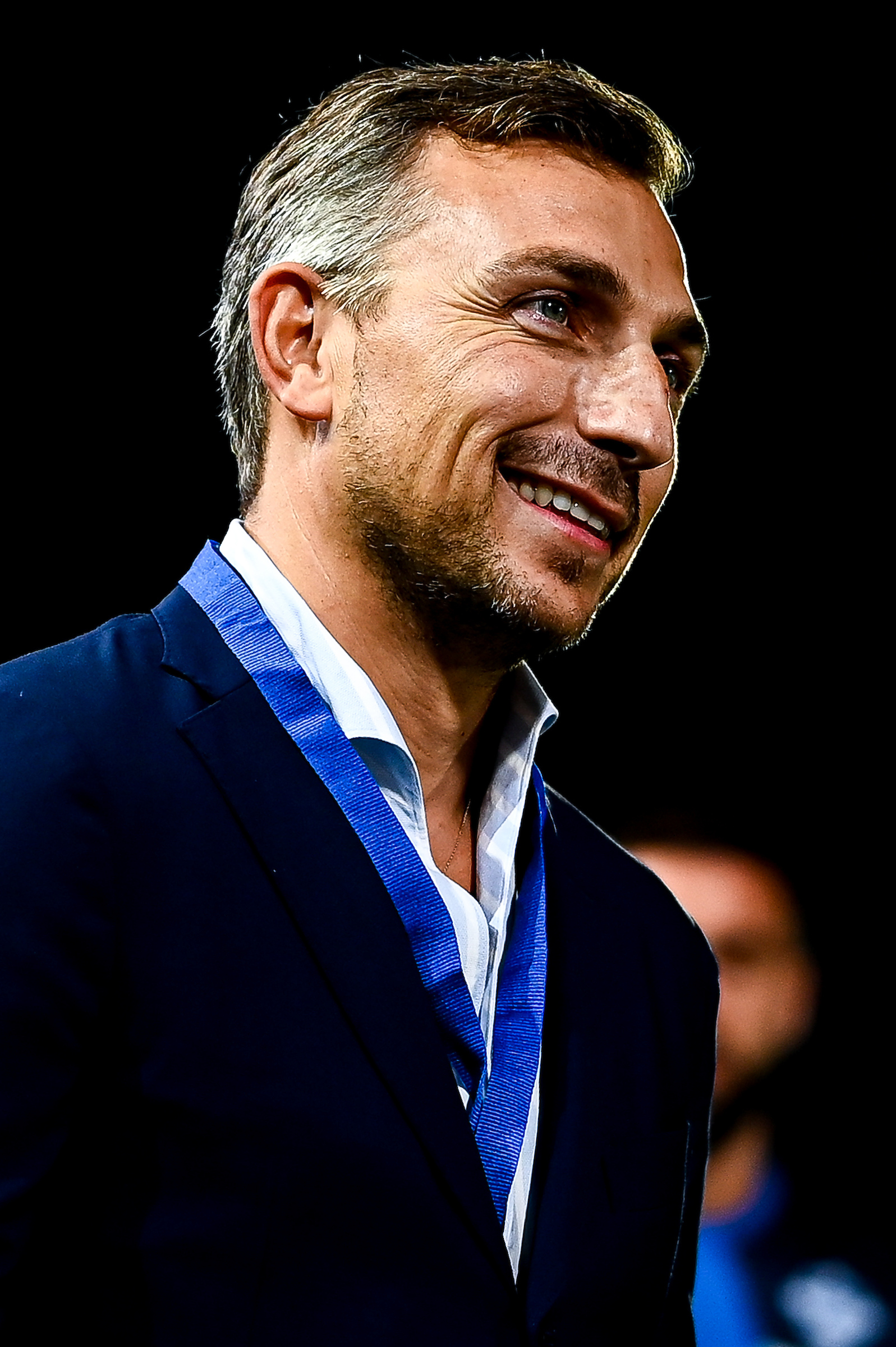
- Born: 1979 (age 46–47); Province of Pavia, Lombardy, Italy
- Citizenship: Italian
- Education: Università Cattolica del Sacro Cuore; Columbia University
- Occupations: Financier; Entrepreneur
- Years active: 2000s–present
- Organizations: Gestio Capital; U.C. Sampdoria
- Title: Founder & CEO of Gestio Capital (2008–present); President of U.C. Sampdoria (2024–present)

Matteo Manfredi (born 1979) is an Italian financier and entrepreneur. He is the founder and chief executive of the multi-family office Gestio Capital, and since 2024 he has served as president of the U.C. Sampdoria.

Manfredi led the takeover of Sampdoria in 2023 when the club was near bankruptcy, and at the time of his appointment he was the youngest club president in Italy's top two football divisions.

== Early life and education ==
Manfredi was born in the Province of Pavia in 1979 to a father who was a banker. He studied economics at the Università Cattolica del Sacro Cuore in Milan and went on to continue his studies at Columbia University in New York, specializing in business administration and management. After completing his academic training, he served for three years as a lieutenant in the Italian Army.

== Career ==
After his military service, Manfredi moved to London to begin a corporate career in finance. He worked as a management consultant at PricewaterhouseCoopers (PwC), advising UK banks on complex transactions, and then held senior roles at Barclays and at Lloyds Banking Group as an advisor on European deals. After the 2008 financial crisis, Manfredi founded Gestio Capital, a London-based multi-family office (later also with offices in Milan), focused on providing independent, personalized wealth management for a select group of clients. He remains the company’s chief executive, and through Gestio Capital he has been involved in various international investments.

== Investments ==
In 2023, Manfredi worked with his associate (and Leeds United owner) Andrea Radrizzani in facilitating the sale of the English football club Leeds to new investors, 49ers Enterprises.

In mid-2023, Manfredi led the effort to acquire the Genoese club Sampdoria, which was on the verge of collapse. With the help of Radrizzani’s football expertise, Manfredi’s group took control of Sampdoria and stabilized its finances. He assumed the role of club president in March 2024, becoming, at age 44, the youngest president among all Serie A and Serie B clubs at that time. During the 2023–24 season, under head coach Andrea Pirlo, Sampdoria qualified for the Serie B promotion playoffs.

Manfredi has made investments in technology companies. In 2021, he made a personal investment in Insilico Medicine, a company that uses generative AI for drug discovery.

In early 2023, Gestio Capital invested alongside Microsoft in a major funding round in OpenAI, becoming one of the first European investors in the company. Gestio Capital was part of a group that invested over $675 million in a Series B round for Figure AI, a robotics company developing humanoid robots.

In April 2025, it was reported that Gestio Capital was structuring a Luxembourg investment vehicle in partnership with a European bank to open its AI portfolio to a broader set of qualified investors.

== Recognition ==
In 2024, Manfredi was named among the Top 100 Managers by Forbes.
