= Nadejda Colesnicenco =

Moldovan footballer (born 1996)

Personal information
- Date of birth: 28 June 1996 (age 30)
- Place of birth: Bender, Moldova
- Position: Midfielder

Team information
- Current team: Vasas

Senior career*
Years	Team	Apps	(Gls)
- Vasas

International career^{‡}
- Moldova
- * Club domestic league appearances and goals as of 19:45, 30 August 2019 (UTC) ‡ National team caps and goals as of 19:45, 30 August 2019 (UTC)

Nadejda Colesnicenco (born 28 June 1996) is a Moldovan footballer who plays as a midfielder and has appeared for the Moldova women's national team.

== Career ==
Colesnicenco has been capped for the Moldova national team, appearing for the team during the 2019 FIFA Women's World Cup qualifying cycle.

== International goals ==
No.	Date	Venue	Opponent	Score	Result	Competition
1.	6 April 2017	LFF Stadium, Vilnius, Lithuania	Andorra	4–0	4–0	2019 FIFA Women's World Cup qualification
2.	31 October 2023	Zimbru Stadium, Chișinău, Moldova	Latvia	2–1	3–3	2023–24 UEFA Women's Nations League C
3.	9 June 2026	Dasaki Stadium, Dasaki Achnas, Cyprus	Cyprus	1–0	1–0	2027 FIFA Women's World Cup qualification
4.	12 October 2026	Zimbru Stadium, Chișinău, Moldova	Georgia	1–0	1–0	Friendly
