= Daniela Sabatino =

Italian retired footballer (born 1985)

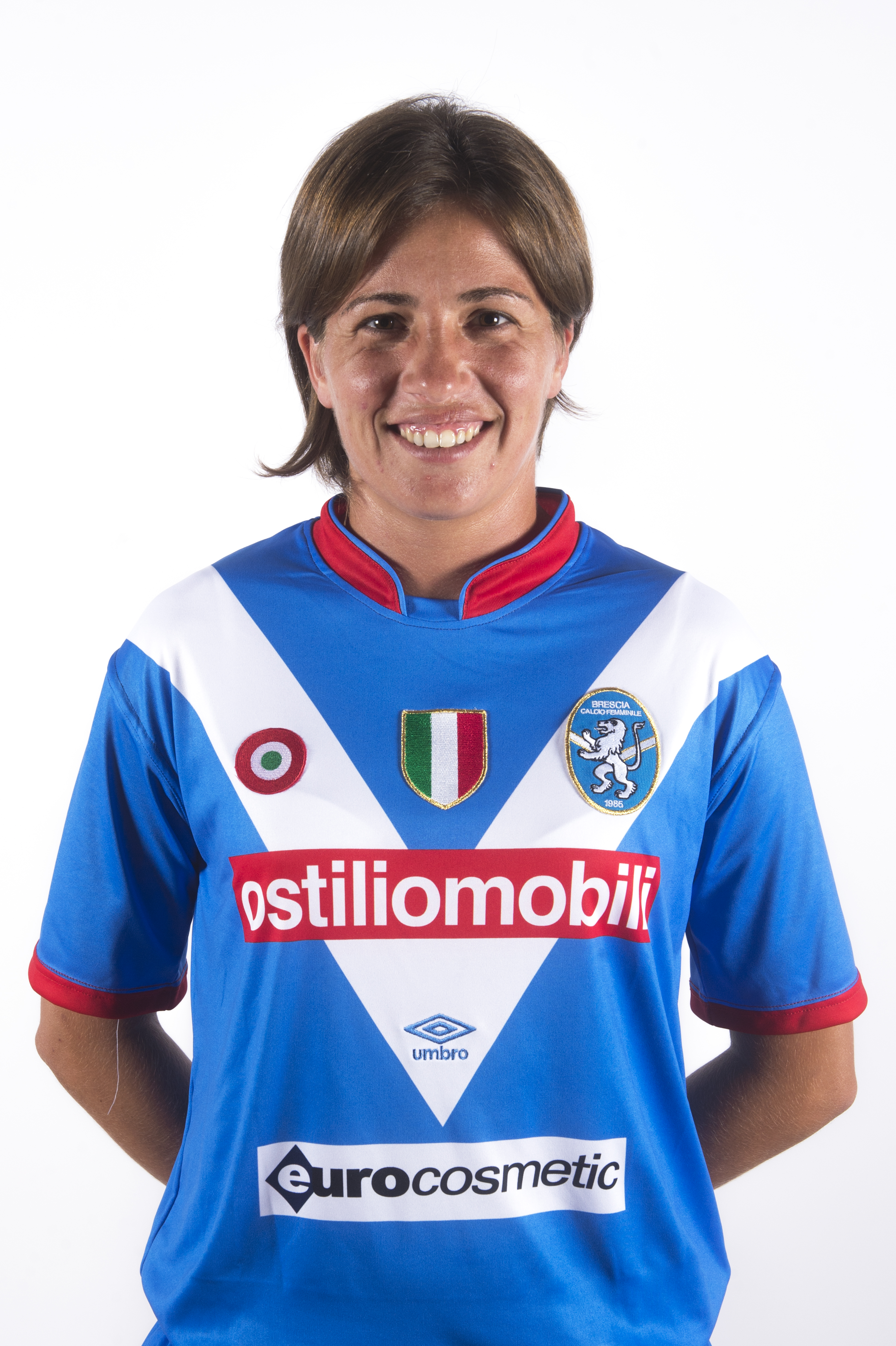
- Sabatino as a Brescia player in 2016

Personal information
- Date of birth: 26 June 1985 (age 41)
- Place of birth: Isernia, Italy
- Height: 1.67 m (5 ft 6 in)
- Position: Striker

Senior career*
Years	Team	Apps	(Gls)
2003–2005	Bojano	44	(44)
2005–2006	Rapid Lugano	21	(13)
2006–2010	Reggiana	88	(61)
2010–2018	Brescia	198	(162)
2018–2019	AC Milan	22	(17)
2019–2020	Sassuolo	16	(12)
2020–2023	Fiorentina	52	(32)
2023–2026	Sassuolo	76	(21)

International career
2011–2022	Italy	70	(32)
- * Club domestic league appearances and goals

Daniela Sabatino (born 26 June 1985) is an Italian former professional footballer who played as a striker. She has previously played for Reggiana, Brescia, AC Milan, Sassuolo and Fiorentina in Serie A. She also spent a season abroad with Rapid Lugano in the Swiss Nationalliga A. She was the joint top scorer of Serie A with 25 goals in 2011, and was the top scorer outright in 2022 with 15 goals.

== International career ==
She made her debut for the Italian national team in October 2011, in a 0–9 win over Macedonia where she scored a hat-trick. Euro 2017 marked her first appearance in a final tournament. The second of the two goals in Italy's 3–2 win over Sweden earned her a Best Goal nomination in the UEFA awards.

Sabatino was called up to the Italy squad for the UEFA Women's Euro 2017.

Sabatino was called up to the Italy squad for the 2019 FIFA Women's World Cup.

On 26 June 2022, Sabatino was announced in the Italy squad for the UEFA Women's Euro 2022.

== International goals ==
No.	Date	Venue	Opponent	Score	Result	Competition
1.	22 October 2011	Stadion Goce Delčev, Prilep, Macedonia	Macedonia	4–0	9–0	UEFA Women's Euro 2013 qualifying
2.	22 October 2011	Stadion Goce Delčev, Prilep, Macedonia	Macedonia	5–0	9–0	UEFA Women's Euro 2013 qualifying
3.	22 October 2011	Stadion Goce Delčev, Prilep, Macedonia	Macedonia	9–0	9–0	UEFA Women's Euro 2013 qualifying
4.	16 June 2012	Stadio Olimpico di Torino, Turin, Italy	Macedonia	8–0	9–0	UEFA Women's Euro 2013 qualifying
5.	17 September 2014	Stadio Silvio Piola, Vercelli, Italy	Macedonia	1–0	15–0	2015 FIFA Women's World Cup qualification
6.	17 September 2014	Stadio Silvio Piola, Vercelli, Italy	Macedonia	5–0	15–0	2015 FIFA Women's World Cup qualification
7.	17 September 2014	Stadio Silvio Piola, Vercelli, Italy	Macedonia	6–0	15–0	2015 FIFA Women's World Cup qualification
8.	17 September 2014	Stadio Silvio Piola, Vercelli, Italy	Macedonia	7–0	15–0	2015 FIFA Women's World Cup qualification
9.	17 September 2014	Stadio Silvio Piola, Vercelli, Italy	Macedonia	8–0	15–0	2015 FIFA Women's World Cup qualification
10.	17 September 2014	Stadio Silvio Piola, Vercelli, Italy	Macedonia	14–0	15–0	2015 FIFA Women's World Cup qualification
11.	18 September 2015	Stadio Alberto Picco, La Spezia, Italy	Georgia	4–1	6–1	UEFA Women's Euro 2017 qualifying
12.	2 March 2016	Anagennisi Stadium, Deryneia, Cyprus	Hungary	2–0	2–0	2016 Cyprus Women's Cup
13.	12 April 2016	Mapei Stadium – Città del Tricolore, Reggio Emilia, Italy	Northern Ireland	1–1	3–1	UEFA Women's Euro 2017 qualifying
14.	7 June 2016	Tengiz Burjanadze Stadium, Gori, Georgia	Georgia	3–0	7–0	UEFA Women's Euro 2017 qualifying
15.	3 March 2017	Ammochostos Stadium, Larnaca, Cyprus	Belgium	1–0	1–4	2017 Cyprus Women's Cup
16.	25 July 2017	De Vijverberg, Doetinchem, Netherlands	Sweden	1–0	3–2	UEFA Women's Euro 2017
17.	25 July 2017	De Vijverberg, Doetinchem, Netherlands	Sweden	2–1	3–2	UEFA Women's Euro 2017
18.	15 September 2017	Stadio Alberto Picco, La Spezia, Italy	Moldova	1–0	5–0	2019 FIFA Women's World Cup qualification
19.	28 November 2017	Estádio António Coimbra da Mota, Estoril, Portugal	Portugal	1–0	1–0	2019 FIFA Women's World Cup qualification
20.	4 March 2019	AEK Arena, Larnaca, Cyprus	Thailand	2–0	4–1	2019 Cyprus Women's Cup
21.	6 March 2019	GSZ Stadium, Larnaca, Cyprus	North Korea	2–2	3–3 (a.e.t.) (7–6 p)	2019 Cyprus Women's Cup
28.	8 November 2019	Stadio Ciro Vigorito, Benevento, Italy	Georgia	4–0	6–0	UEFA Women's Euro 2022 qualifying
29.	8 November 2019	Stadio Ciro Vigorito, Benevento, Italy	Georgia	5–0	6–0	UEFA Women's Euro 2022 qualifying
30.	12 November 2019	Stadio Teofilo Patini, Castel di Sangro, Italy	Malta	3–0	5–0	UEFA Women's Euro 2022 qualifying
31.	24 February 2021	Stadio Artemio Franchi, Florence, Italy	Israel	8–0	12–0	UEFA Women's Euro 2022 qualifying
32.	24 February 2021	Stadio Artemio Franchi, Florence, Italy	Israel	10–0	12–0	UEFA Women's Euro 2022 qualifying
33.	8 April 2022	Stadio Ennio Tardini, Parma, Italy	Lithuania	5–0	7–0	2023 FIFA Women's World Cup qualification

== Honours ==
ASD Reggiana CF

- Coppa Italia: 2009–10

Brescia

- Serie A: 2013–14, 2015–16
- Coppa Italia: 2011–12, 2014–15, 2015–16
- Supercoppa Italiana: 2014, 2015, 2016, 2017

Individual

- Serie A top scorer: 2010–11, 2021–22
- Serie A Best Forward: 2021–22
- AIC Serie A Women's Team of the Year: 2019–20
