= 2003 FIFA Women's World Cup qualification (UEFA) =

Football tournament qualification stage

In the UEFA qualification for the 2003 FIFA Women's World Cup, the 16 teams belonging to the First Category of European women's football were drawn into four groups, from which the group winners qualify for the World Cup finals. The winner of the Qualifying Playoffs between the Runners-up of each four group will also qualify.

== CLASS A ==
=== Group 1 ===
Team	Pts	Pld	W	D	L	GF	GA	GD	
Norway	16	6	5	1	0	21	3	+18	Qualified for 2003 FIFA Women's World Cup
France	12	6	4	0	2	11	9	+2	Advanced to play-off
Ukraine	7	6	2	1	3	9	12	−3	
Czech Republic	0	6	0	0	6	6	23	−17	

==== Match schedule & results ====
25 August 2001

Ukraine	4–1	Czech Republic
Verezoubova 10'; Pekur 31'; Ivanova 51'; Zinchenko 77'		Urbancová 83'

Kolos, Boryspil
Referee: Ödlund (Sweden)

8 September 2001

Norway	4–0	Ukraine
Ørmen 23', 90'; Gulbrandsen 27'; Mellgren 47'

Åråsen, Lilleström
Referee: Peltola (Finland)

11 September 2001

Norway	5–0	Czech Republic
Mellgren 26'; Ørmen 38'; Gulbrandsen 41'; Riise 62'; Bugge-Paulsen 90'

Gjemselund, Kongsvinger
Referee: Malzinskas (Lithuania)

13 October 2001

France	0–3	Norway
		Lehn 2', 29'; Mellgren 55'

Pierre de Coubertin, Cannes-la-Bocca
Referee: Petignat (Switzerland)

28 October 2001

Ukraine	0–2	France
		Pichon 3', 7'

Kolos, Boryspil
Referee: Toms (England)

17 November 2001

Czech Republic	1–2	France
Chlumecká 59'		Pichon 7', 28'

FK Drnovice, Dronvice
Referee: Frai (Germany)

24 March 2002

Czech Republic	1–5	Norway
Dudová 18'		Papp 19'; Gulbrandsen 23'; Lehn 32'; Sæthre 60'; Ørmen 64'

TJ Slany, Slany
Referee: Trampusch (Austria)

20 April 2002

France	4–1	Czech Republic
Soubeyrand 5'; Pichon 30'; Mugneret-Béghé 39'; Blouin 48'		Šcasná 90' (pen)

La Meinau, Strasbourg
Referee: Jonsson (Sweden)

9 May 2002

Norway	3–1	France
Mellgren 3', 25', 55'		Pichon 10'

Halden Stadion
Referee: De Toni (Italy)

12 May 2002

Ukraine	1–1	Norway
Mykhailenko 60'		Gulbrandsen 53'

CSK ZSU Stadium, Kyiv
Referee: Günthner (Germany)

26 May 2002

Czech Republic	2–3	Ukraine
Chlumecká 12'; Penicková 86'		Mykhailenko 32'; Zinchenko 46'; Frishko 76'

FK Chmel, Blšany
Referee: Quintero Siles (Spain)

1 June 2002

France	2–1	Ukraine
Pichon 60'; Soubeyrand 73'		Verezoubova 51'

Gaston Petit, Châteauroux
Referee: Elovirta (Finland)

=== Group 2 ===
Team	Pts	Pld	W	D	L	GF	GA	GD	
Sweden	15	6	5	0	1	27	4	+23	Qualified for 2003 FIFA Women's World Cup
Denmark	15	6	5	0	1	21	8	+13	Advanced to play-off
Switzerland	3	6	1	0	5	2	18	−16	
Finland	3	6	1	0	5	4	24	−20	

==== Match schedule & results ====
4 September 2001

Switzerland	1–0	Finland
Di Fonzo 24'

Lättich, Baar
Referee: Brohet (Sweden)

8 September 2001

Denmark	4–0	Switzerland
Bonde 5' (pen); Kjældgaard 20', 47'; Madsen 90+3'

Odense Stadium
Referee: Hlavac (Czech Republic)

9 September 2001

Sweden	8–1	Finland
Svensson 10', 45'; Mostström 22'; Andersson 25' (pen); Ljungberg 43'; Bengtsson 72', 89'; Sjöström 80'	SvFF Report (in Swedish)	Uusi-Luomalahti 19' (pen)

Gammliavallen, Umeå
Referee: Skjerven (Norway)

30 September 2001

Sweden	4–1	Denmark
Bengtsson 5'; Ljungberg 68'; Andersson 71'; Björn 75'	SvFF Report(in Swedish)	Pedersen 43'

Malmö IP
Referee: Toms (England)

13 October 2001

Finland	0–6	Denmark
		Rydahl 7'; Hansen 8'; Pedersen 43', 89'; Andersson 39'; Bonde 85' (pen)

Pohjola, Vantaa
Referee: Frai (Germany)

3 November 2001

Switzerland	0–5	Sweden
	SvFF Report(in Swedish)	Ljungberg 28'; Björn 60'; Larsson 68', 90+2'; Sjöström 79'

Au-Stadion, Brugg
Referee: Ionescu (Romania)

20 April 2002

Switzerland	1–4	Denmark
Di Fonzo 43'		Andersen 12'; Bonde 42', 79'; Pedersen 56'

Gemeinde Sportplatz, Gossau
Referee: Malek-Wybraniec (Poland)

5 May 2002

Finland	1–0	Switzerland
Mustonen 65'

Pohjola, Vantaa
Referee: Avdonchenko (Russia)

8 May 2002

Sweden	4–0	Switzerland
Svensson 2', 54'; Ljungberg 42', 88'	SvFF Report (in Swedish)

Råsunda, Solna
Referee: Frai (Germany)

26 May 2002

Denmark	4–2	Finland
Jensen 22', 61'; Jokmusen 82', 90'		Heikari 16'; Kalmari 84'

Odense Stadium
Referee: Ionescu (Romania)

9 June 2002

Denmark	2–1	Sweden
Terp 75'; Sørensen 88'	SvFF Report (in Swedish)	Andersson 60' (pen)

Ballerup Idrætspark, Copenhagen
Referee: Mulder (Netherlands)

26 June 2002

Finland	0–5	Sweden
	SvFF Report (in Swedish)	Eriksson 20', 43'; Ljungberg 46'; Svensson 48', 78'

Centralplan, Jakobstad
Referee: Ihringova (Slovakia)

=== Group 3 ===
Team	Pts	Pld	W	D	L	GF	GA	GD	
Russia	11	6	3	2	1	10	6	+4	Qualified for 2003 FIFA Women's World Cup
Iceland	9	6	2	3	1	8	9	−1	Advanced to play-off
Italy	7	6	2	1	3	7	7	0	
Spain	6	6	2	0	4	8	11	−3	

==== Match schedule & results ====
18 August 2001

Iceland	1–1	Russia
Færseth 49'		Barbachina 8'

KR-Völlur, Reykjavík
Referee: Hänninen (Finland)

8 September 2001

Iceland	2–1	Italy
Færseth 40', 52'		Helgadóttir 80' (o.g.)

Laugardalsvöllur, Reykjavík
Referee: Stadgård (Denmark)

30 September 2001

Spain	6–1	Iceland
Del Río 4', 30'; Jiménez 43', 59'; Gimbert 86' (pen); Ferreira 87'		Ólafsdóttir 63'

Pinilla, Teruel
Referee: Fielenbach (Germany)

10 October 2001

Italy	1–3	Russia
Guarino 58'		Bosikova 31'; Fomina 60'

Stadio Artemio Franchi, Siena
Referee: Jonsson (Sweden)

28 October 2001

Russia	2–0	Spain
Svetlitskaia 11'; Bosikova

Stroitel, Selyatino
Referee: Skogvang (Norway)

28 November 2001

Italy	3–0	Spain

Città di Castello, Italy

24 March 2002

Spain	0–1	Italy

Pozoblanco, Spain

29 April 2002

Spain	2–1	Russia
Jiménez 10'; Del Río 33'		Saenko 62'

Molina de Segura, Spain

18 May 2002

Russia	1–1	Iceland

Selyatino, Russia

22 May 2002

Russia	2–1	Italy

Selyatino, Russia

30 May 2002

Iceland	3–0	Spain

Reykjavík, Iceland

8 June 2002

Italy	0–0	Iceland

Arzachena, Italy

=== Group 4 ===
Team	Pts	Pld	W	D	L	GF	GA	GD	
Germany	18	6	6	0	0	30	1	+29	Qualified for 2003 FIFA Women's World Cup
England	8	6	2	2	2	9	6	+3	Advanced to play-off
Netherlands	4	6	1	1	4	6	16	−10	
Portugal	4	6	1	1	4	4	26	−22	

==== Match schedule & results ====
27 September 2001

Germany	3–1	England
M.Müller 3'; Smisek 7', 11'		Yankey 49'

Auestadion, Kassel
Referee: Vibeke Karlsen (Norway)

25 October 2001

Germany	9–0	Portugal
Pohlers 2', 25', 57', 63', 84'; Künzer 6'; M. Müller 12', 26', 90'	Report

VfL-Stadion, Wolfsburg
Referee: Alexandra Ihringova (Slovakia)

4 November 2001

England	0–0	Netherlands
	Report (in Dutch)

Blundell Park, Cleethorpes
Attendance: 4,130
Referee: Katriina Elovirta (Finland)

17 November 2001

Netherlands	0–3	Germany
	Report (in Dutch)	Wunderlich 9'; Prinz 53'; Mensink 62' (o.g.)

De Grolsch Veste, Enschede
Attendance: 9,300
Referee: Maria Persson (Sweden)

24 November 2001

Portugal	1–1	England
Anabela 5'	Report	Walker 38'

Complexo Desportivo, Gafanha da Nazaré
Referee: Claudine Brohet (Belgium)

8 December 2001

Portugal	2–1	Netherlands
Sónia 80', 90'	Report	Muller 14'

Estádio Municipal de Tábua, Tábua
Referee: Marta Atzori (Italy)

24 February 2002

England	3–0	Portugal
Williams 20'; Smith 58', 60'	Report

Fratton Park, Portsmouth
Attendance: 8,821 (British Record)
Referee: Anri Hänninen (Finland)

23 March 2002

Netherlands	1–4	England
Kiesel-Griffioen 55'	Report (in Dutch)	Chapman 16'; Burke 24'; Smith 73'; Walker 89'

Zuiderpark Stadion, The Hague
Referee: Ausra Tvarijonaite (Lithuania)

18 April 2002

Germany	6–0	Netherlands
Wiegmann 4' (pen.), 32', 90'; Prinz 41', 49', 84'	Report (in Dutch)

Stadion am Schönbusch, Aschaffenburg
Attendance: 9,050
Referee: Rita Ruiz Tacorante (Spain)

4 May 2002

Portugal	0–8	Germany
	Report	Wunderlich 6', 59'; Lingor 12', 56'; Stegemann 40'; Mónica 50' (o.g.); Grings 62'; Prinz 85'

Estádio Adelino Ribeiro Novo, Barcelos
Referee: Eva Ödlund (Sweden)

19 May 2002

Netherlands	4–1	Portugal
Smith 24'; Ran 58'; Noom 72'; Burger 76'	Report	Bé 51'

Sportpark Molenbroek, Gemert
Attendance: 1,200
Referee: Dagmar Damková (Czech Republic)

19 May 2002

England	0–1	Germany
		Gottschlich 41'

Selhurst Park, London
Attendance: 14,107 BRITISH RECORD
Referee: Rindali (Italy)

Germany qualified for 2003 FIFA Women's World Cup.

== CLASS B ==
=== Group 5 ===
Team	Pts	Pld	W	D	L	GF	GA
Scotland	15	6	5	0	1	20	5
Belgium	15	6	5	0	1	13	9
Austria	4	6	1	1	4	7	15
Wales	1	6	0	1	5	2	13

29 September 2001

Austria	1–2	Scotland
Stallinger 21'		James 51'; Gilmour 74'

Leopoldsdorf, Austria

10 October 2001

Wales	0–2	Austria
		Stallinger 68'; Schalkhammer-Hufnagl 80'

Llanelli, Wales

28 October 2001

Scotland	5–1	Wales
Fleeting 10', 34', 68', 75'; James 47'		Ludlow 8'

Livingston, Scotland

28 October 2001

Belgium	3–1	Austria
Carnol 55'; Verelst 62'; Vautmans 87'		Spieler 59'

Wavre, Belgium

17 November 2001

Wales	0–2	Belgium
		Verelst 12'; Ebhodaghe 84'

Rhyl, Wales

25 November 2001

Belgium	3–2	Scotland
Carnol 29', 33', 88'		Brown 88'; Kerr 90'

Belsele, Belgium

24 March 2002

Belgium	1–0	Wales
Jones 28' (o.g.)

La Louvière, Belgium

6 April 2002

Austria	2–4	Belgium
Szankovich 45'; Fuhrmann 55'		Dermul 14'; Verelst 28'; Maes 45'; Ebhodaghe 85'

Fußach, Austria

21 April 2002

Scotland	4–0	Belgium
McWhinnie 20'; Fleeting 42', 53'; Cook 44'

Livingston, Scotland

5 May 2002

Scotland	5–0	Austria
Fleeting 11', 19', 51'; Cook 33'; Hamill 89'

Livingston, Scotland

19 May 2002

Wales	0–2	Scotland
		James 54'; Fleeting 81'

Merthyr Tydfil, Wales

25 May 2002

Austria	1–1	Wales
Spieler 45'		Foster 45'

Ottensheim, Austria

=== Group 6 ===
Team	Pts	Pld	W	D	L	GF	GA
FR Yugoslavia	18	6	6	0	0	23	3
Republic of Ireland	12	6	4	0	2	18	7
Greece	3	6	1	0	5	7	19
Moldova	3	6	1	0	5	3	22

8 September 2001

FR Yugoslavia	5–0	Republic of Ireland
Stojanović 2', 53', 57'; Stefanović 76'; Stojiljković 88' (pen.)	Report

FK Rudar Alpos, Aleksinački Rudnik
Referee: Marian Dorobanțu (Romania)

12 September 2001

Moldova	0–4	Republic of Ireland
	Report	Hughes 21'; Thorpe 30', 79'; O'Toole 57'

Stadionul Republican, Chișinău
Referee: Zsolt Szabó (Hungary)

29 September 2001

Moldova	1–2	FR Yugoslavia

Moldova

27 October 2001

FR Yugoslavia	6–1	Greece

Yugoslavia

17 November 2001

Republic of Ireland	5–0	Greece
Scanlan 25'; O'Toole 54', 73'; Thorpe 56'; Kierans 86'	Report

Dalymount Park, Dublin
Referee: Caroline De Boeck (Belgium)

28 November 2001

Greece	1–2	Moldova

Greece

24 March 2002

Greece	1–3	Republic of Ireland
Lazarou 89' (pen.)	Report	Hughes 16'; O'Toole 46', 65'

Rethymno Gallos Stadium, Rethymno
Referee: Regina Belksma-Konink (Netherlands)

6 April 2002

Republic of Ireland	6–0	Moldova
O'Toole 11', 38' (pen.); Hughes 21'; Thorpe 60'; Saurin 67'; Tracy 78'	Report

Flancare Park, Longford
Referee: Irina Pavlova

20 April 2002

Greece	1–3	FR Yugoslavia

Greece

11 May 2002

FR Yugoslavia	6–0	Moldova

Yugoslavia

18 May 2002

Moldova	0–3	Greece

Moldova

18 May 2002

Republic of Ireland	0–1	FR Yugoslavia
	Report	Smiljković 76'

Flancare Park, Longford
Referee: Tonje Overgaard Nordby

=== Group 7 ===
Team	Pts	Pld	W	D	L	GF	GA
Poland	24	8	8	0	0	25	1
Croatia	13	8	4	1	3	16	11
Israel	13	8	4	1	3	12	14
Romania	8	8	2	2	4	18	13
Estonia	0	8	0	0	8	4	36

6 September 2001

Estonia	2–5	Israel
Mletsin 87'; Morkovkina 89'		Jan 28', 35', 38', 51'; Shenar 32'

Tallinn, Estonia

23 September 2001

Estonia	0–5	Poland
		Leonowicz 1', 77'; Gibek 9'; Drozdowska 58'; Otrębska 75'

Valga, Estonia

23 September 2001

Croatia	4–0	Israel
Jakšić 27', 89'; Kozić 38'; Kovač 47'

Velika Gorica, Croatia

30 September 2001

Croatia	2–2	Romania
Bešker 49'; Jakšić 57'		Spanu 12'; Anton 65'

Osijek, Croatia

13 October 2001

Romania	6–1	Estonia
Spanu 16', 70'; Anton 44', 56'; Striblea 45'; Laslo 61'		Kori 90'

Câmpina, Romania

16 October 2001

Croatia	3–0	Estonia

Zaprešić, Croatia

28 October 2001

Poland	2–0	Croatia

Łęczna, Poland

28 October 2001

Israel	1–0	Romania
Jan 9'

Ramat Gan Stadium, Ramat Gan

18 November 2001

Israel	0–2	Poland

Levita Stadium, Kfar Saba

7 April 2002

Poland	5–0	Estonia

Ostrołęka, Poland

18 April 2002

Estonia	0–3	Croatia

Kuressaare, Estonia

21 April 2002

Romania	0–1	Poland

Câmpina, Romania

5 May 2002

Poland	4–0	Israel

Włocławek, Poland

18 May 2002

Poland	3–1	Romania

Biała Podlaska, Poland

25 May 2002

Croatia	0–3	Poland

Krapina, Croatia

26 May 2002

Romania	1–1	Israel

Câmpina, Romania

1 June 2002

Romania	2–3	Croatia

Câmpina, Romania

4 June 2002

Israel	3–0	Estonia
Didich 48' (pen.); Jan 71'; Shenar 90'

Kyiv, Ukraine

6 June 2002

Israel	2–1	Croatia
Ozeri 5'; Didich 88'		Kovač 2'

Kyiv, Ukraine

9 June 2002

Estonia	1–6	Romania

Pärnu, Estonia

=== Group 8 ===
Team	Pld	W	D	L	GF	GA	Pts
Hungary	8	8	0	0	33	5	24
Slovakia	8	5	0	3	25	11	15
Belarus	8	5	0	3	27	16	15
Turkey	8	1	0	7	10	27	3
Bosnia and Herzegovina	8	1	0	7	10	46	3

16 August 2001

Bosnia and Herzegovina	0–7	Slovakia
Saracevic (yellow card) 60' Vugdalic (yellow card) 67' Pehic (yellow card) 72' Fetic (yellow card) 82'	/ SFZ Report (in Slovak)	Beregszasziova 08',19',24',76' Lukácsová 25',52' Budošová 45+2' Čillíková (yellow card) 36'

Zavidovici Bosnia and Herzegovina
Referee: Regina Konink-Belksma Nederland

20 August 2001

Belarus	5–2	Bosnia and Herzegovina

Spartak Stadium, Mogilev

8 September 2001

Hungary	3–0	Bosnia and Herzegovina

Hungary

8 September 2001

Belarus	3–2	Slovakia
Vyshadka (yellow card) 13' Kuzniatsova 20' Kuzniatsova (red card) 39' Shpak 64' Ryzhevich 80'	SFZ Report (in Slovak)	Gajdošová 40' Lukácsová 81'

Spartak Stadium, Mogilev
Referee: Sergo Kvaratskhelia Georgia

26 September 2001

Belarus	4–0	Turkey

Spartak Stadium, Mogilev

29 September 2001

Slovakia	0–2	Hungary
	SFZ Report (in Slovak)	Szabó (yellow card) 09' Ilona Szabó 54' Bilicsné (yellow card) 61' Dombai-Nagy (yellow card) 70' Sebestyén (yellow card) 77' Sebestyén 89'

Slovakia
Referee: Elke Gunthner Germany

13 October 2001

Turkey	0–3	Slovakia
Cinbiz (yellow card) 28'	SFZ Report (in Slovak)	Budošová 42' Lukácsová 75' 86'

Turkey
Referee: Tatjana Pavlovic Serbia

13 October 2001

Hungary	2–0	Belarus

Hungary

24 October 2001

Turkey	5–1	Bosnia and Herzegovina

Turkey

21 November 2001

Turkey	1–4	Hungary

Turkey

24 March 2002

Turkey	1–5	Belarus

Turkey

5 April 2002

Slovakia	3–0	Turkey
Lukácsová 06' Ižová 18' Budošová 26'	SFZ Report (in Slovak)	Cinbiz (yellow card) 33' Bakir (yellow card) 39'

Slovakia
Referee: Anna De Toni Italia

13 April 2002

Bosnia and Herzegovina	0–11	Hungary

Bosnia and Herzegovina

13 April 2002

Slovakia	3–1	Belarus
Trnková 13' Trnková (yellow card) 45' Silvia Gajdošová 61' Králiková (yellow card) 62' Girašeková 64' Ižová (yellow card) 67' Girašeková (yellow card) 87'	SFZ Report (in Slovak)	Ryzhova (yellow card) 54' Shpak (yellow card) 60' Lis 68'

Slovakia
Referee: Maria Patrascu Romania

22 April 2002

Belarus	2–4	Hungary

Torpedo Stadium, Minsk

2 May 2002

Bosnia and Herzegovina	3–2	Turkey

Bosnia and Herzegovina

4 May 2002

Hungary	3–1	Slovakia
Dombai-Nagy 18' Szabó 51' Bökk 70'	SFZ Report (in Slovak)	Matysová (yellow card) 65' Látal 88'

Hungary
Referee: Ilonka Milanova Djaleva Bulgaria

14 May 2002

Bosnia and Herzegovina	2–7	Belarus

Bosnia and Herzegovina

23 May 2002

Hungary	4–1	Turkey

Hungary

22 June 2002

Slovakia	6–2	Bosnia and Herzegovina

Slovakia

== World Cup Qualifying Play-off ==
=== Semi-finals ===
23 August 2002

France	2–0	Denmark
Pichon 32'; Bompastor 36'

Stade Félix-Bollaert, Lens
Referee: Ruiz (Spain)
15 September 2002

Denmark	1–1	France
Hansen 9'		Lecouflé 89'

Odense Stadion
Referee: Günthner (Germany)

France won 3-1 on aggregate.

16 September 2002

Iceland	2–2	England
Færseth 42'; Hendriksdóttir 56'		Walker 44', 88'

Laugardalsvöllur, Reykjavik
Referee: Elovirta (Finland)
22 September 2002

England	1–0	Iceland
Barr 87'

St. Andrews, Birmingham
Attendance: 3,442
Referee: Jonsson (Sweden)

England won 3-2 on aggregate.

=== Final ===
17 October 2002

England	0–1	France
		Pichon 75'

Selhurst Park, London
Attendance: 6,004
Referee: Karlsen (Norway)
16 November 2002

France	1–0	England
Diacre 54'

Stade Geoffroy Guichard, Saint-Étienne
Referee: Petignat (Switzerland)

France won 2-0 on aggregate and qualified for 2003 FIFA Women's World Cup.

== Status Playoffs ==
Matches cancelled as UEFA decided to extend Class A to 21 teams, meaning Scotland, FR Yugoslavia, Poland and Hungary are promoted automatically. Belgium were additionally promoted, apparently as best runners-up, due to England receiving a bye to the 2005 European championship, which they will host.

September 2002

Scotland	cancelled	Czech Republic

October 2002

Czech Republic	cancelled	Scotland

September 2002

FR Yugoslavia	cancelled	Finland

October 2002

Finland	cancelled	FR Yugoslavia

September 2002

Poland	cancelled	Portugal

October 2002

Portugal	cancelled	Poland

September 2002

Hungary	cancelled	Spain

October 2002

Spain	cancelled	Hungary
