= UEFA Women's Euro 2005 qualifying =

Football tournament qualification stage

The qualification for the UEFA Women's Euro 2005 was held between 26 March 2003 & 27 November 2004. The first-placed of the group stage qualified directly. The second-placed and the two best third-placed teams played in two playoff matches for three other berths. England qualified as host.

== First Category ==
England qualified automatically as hosts for the final tournament.

=== Group 1 ===
Team	Pts	Pld	W	D	L	GF	GA
Sweden	19	8	6	1	1	26	5
Italy	15	8	4	3	1	15	9
Finland	13	8	3	4	1	12	6
Switzerland	5	8	1	2	5	2	13
Serbia and Montenegro	3	8	1	0	7	3	25

30 March 2003

Italy	8–0	Serbia and Montenegro
Gazzoli 6'; Zorri 18' (pen.); Guarino 28', 44'; Conti 29'; Panico 53', 55'; Tuttino 85'	Report

Stadio Briamasco, Trento
Attendance: 3,000
Referee: Lale Orta (Turkey)

18 April 2003

Sweden	6–0	Switzerland
Moström 29'; Svensson 33'; Fagerström 44'; Ljungberg 46'; Törnqvist 62'; Olsson 90'	Report; SvFF Report (in Swedish)

Fredriksskans, Kalmar
Attendance: 4,787
Referee: Dagmar Damková (Czech Republic)

17 May 2003

Sweden	5–0	Italy
Svensson 18', 45'; Ljungberg 41', 53', 65'	Report; SvFF Report (in Swedish)

Råsunda Stadium, Solna
Attendance: 8,839
Referee: Carla De Boeck (Belgium)

17 May 2003

Switzerland	1–0	Serbia and Montenegro
Zürcher 44'	Report

Stadion Grien, Breitenbach
Attendance: 700
Referee: Rita Ruiz Tacoronte (Spain)

1 June 2003

Finland	1–1	Switzerland
Valkonen 80'	Report	Di Fonzo 38'

Leppävaaran Stadion, Espoo
Attendance: 940
Referee: Ilonka Milanova Djaleva (Bulgaria)

19 July 2003

Finland	1–1	Italy
Mustonen 55'	Report	Panico 19'

Hietalahti Stadium, Vaasa
Attendance: 2,340
Referee: Claudine Brohet (Belgium)

9 August 2003

Sweden	2–1	Finland
Andersson 30'; Ljungberg 50'	Report; SvFF Report (in Swedish)	Valkonen 33'

Tunavallen, Eskilstuna
Attendance: 5,562
Referee: Florea Cristina Ionescu (Romania)

27 September 2003

Switzerland	0–1	Italy
	Report	Panico 30'

Kleine Allmend, Frauenfeld
Attendance: 2,050
Referee: Bente Ovedie Skogvang (Norway)

27 September 2003

Serbia and Montenegro	0–1	Finland
	Report	Kackur 40'

Subotica City Stadium, Subotica
Referee: Martina Storch-Schäfer (Germany)

15 November 2003

Serbia and Montenegro	0–4	Sweden
	Report	Moström 11'; Ljungberg 30'; Larsson 42'; Marklund 82'

Stadion Jusa Bulić, Železnik
Attendance: 400
Referee: Maria Trampusch (Austria)

24 April 2004

Italy	1–1	Finland
Panico 11'	Report	Kackur 33'

Stadio Degli Ulivi, Andria
Referee: Paloma Quintero Siles (Spain)

24 April 2004

Switzerland	0–2	Sweden
	Report; SvFF Report (in Swedish)	Olsson 2'; Johansson 90'

Stadion FC Solothurn, Solothurn
Referee: Christine Frai (Germany)

12 May 2004

Sweden	5–1	Serbia and Montenegro
Törnqvist 55'; Sjöström 60'; Moström 69'; Svensson 81'; Mitić 90' (o.g.)	Report; SvFF Report (in Swedish)	Podovac 34'

Värendsvallen, Växjö
Referee: Christine Bango (Austria)

15 May 2004

Finland	4–0	Serbia and Montenegro
Kackur 7'; Kalmari 31'; Julin 45'; Rantanen 75'	Report

Töölön jalkapallostadion, Helsinki
Referee: Natalia Avdonchenko (Russia)

22 May 2004

Italy	0–0	Switzerland
	Report

Stadio Polisportivo Provinciale, Trapani
Referee: Sarah Girard (France)

26 June 2004

Italy	2–1	Sweden
Gazzoli 59'; Panico 69'	Report; SvFF Report (in Swedish)	Nordin 32'

Stadio Santa Colomba, Benevento
Referee: Elke Günthner (Germany)

4 September 2004

Switzerland	0–2	Finland
	Report	Kalmari 59'; Kackur 90'

Sportplatz Mühleye, Visp
Referee: Vibeke Karlsen (Norway)

25 September 2004

Serbia and Montenegro	1–2	Italy
Mladenović 90'	Report	Gabbiadini 12'; Placchi 54'

Čair Stadium, Niš
Referee: Zuzana Dohnanska (Slovakia)

29 September 2004

Serbia and Montenegro	1–0	Switzerland
Ranđelović 45'	Report

Mladost Stadium, Kruševac
Referee: Florea Cristina Ionescu (Romania)

2 October 2004

Finland	1–1	Sweden
Kackur 70'	Report; SvFF Report (in Swedish)	Thunebro 24'

Hietalahti Stadium, Vaasa
Referee: Wendy Toms (England)

Sweden qualified for the final tournament.

Italy and Finland advanced for the playoff.

=== Group 2 ===
Team	Pts	Pld	W	D	L	GF	GA
Denmark	22	8	7	1	0	26	4
Norway	19	8	6	1	1	22	4
Spain	7	8	2	1	5	10	10
Netherlands	7	8	2	1	5	7	13
Belgium	3	8	1	0	7	5	39

26 March 2003

Netherlands	0–1	Spain
	Report (in Dutch)	del Río 72'

Oosterenkstadion, Zwolle
Referee: Eva Ödlund (Sweden)

11 May 2003

Norway	6–0	Belgium
S. Gulbrandsen 15'; Lehn 50'; Mellgren 61'; Klaveness 68'; Edner 90'; Ørmen 90+3'	Report

Kristiansand Stadion, Kristiansand
Attendance: 1,307
Referee: Natalia Avdonchenko (Russia)

15 May 2003

Norway	2–0	Netherlands
Rapp 26', 40'	Report (in Dutch)

Idrettsparken, Mandal
Attendance: 1,042
Referee: Elke Günther (Germany)

11 September 2003

Norway	1–1	Denmark
Pettersen 32'	Report	L. Jensen 68'

Sofiemyr Stadion, Kolbotn
Attendance: 1,387
Referee: Alexandra Ihringova (England)

5 October 2003

Belgium	1–6	Denmark
de Rycke 53'	Report	Nielsen 20', 66', 88' (pen.); Johansen 36', 60', 62'

Stade Justin Peeters, Wavre
Referee: Ilonka Milanova Djaleva (Bulgaria)

18 October 2003

Denmark	3–0	Netherlands
Johansen 70', 74'; Bukh 83'	Report (in Dutch)

Dalum Stadion, Odense
Attendance: 818
Referee: Natalia Avdonchenko (Russia)

16 November 2003

Spain	0–2	Norway
	Report	Mellgren 28'; Fosse-Sæthre 83'

Ciudad del Fútbol, Las Rozas de Madrid
Attendance: 1,173
Referee: Christine Frai (Germany)

22 November 2003

Netherlands	3–0	Belgium
van Veen 15' de Boer 51'; Torny 64'	Report (in Dutch)

Jan Louwers Stadion, Eindhoven
Attendance: 4,000
Referee: Nicole Petignat (Switzerland)

29 February 2004

Spain	9–1	Belgium
Gurrutxaga 8'; Del Río 15', 23', 50', 86', 89'; Castillo 35'; Vázquez 73', 78'	Report	Verelst 6'

La Forana, Alginet
Referee: Sabina De Nitto (Italy)

7 March 2004

Belgium	1–6	Norway
Maes 53' (pen.)	Report	Pedersen 8', 72'; Frantzen 35'; Hansen 69'; Stangeland 76'; S. Gulbrandsen 82'

De Singel, Strombeek-Bever
Attendance: 1,031
Referee: Lale Orta (Turkey)

21 March 2004

Spain	0–0	Netherlands
	Report (in Dutch)

Municipal La Roda, La Roda
Attendance: 1,000
Referee: Florea Cristina Ionescu (Romania)

18 April 2004

Spain	0–1	Denmark
	Report	M. Pedersen 30'

Municipal Lucena, Lucena
Referee: Dagmar Damková (Czech Republic)

25 April 2004

Belgium	0–3	Netherlands
	Report (in Dutch)	Koster 10'; Melis 74'; Muller 84'

Den Dreef, Heverlee
Attendance: 500
Referee: Jenny Palmqvist (Sweden)

2 May 2004

Belgium	2–0	Spain
Kristel Verelest 15' van Humbeeck 50'	Report

Charles Tondreau, Mons
Referee: Anri Saarivainio Hänninen (Finland)

22 May 2004

Denmark	2–0	Spain
Paaske Sørensen 44'; Eggers Nielsen 85'	Report

Farum Park, Farum
Referee: Wendy Toms (England)

22 May 2004

Netherlands	0–2	Norway
	Report (in Dutch)	Pedersen 56'; Lehn 61'

Mulderssingel, Wezep
Attendance: 2,500
Referee: Anna De Toni (Italy)

27 May 2004

Denmark	2–1	Norway
Paaske Sørensen 2'; L. Jensen 85'	Report	Pedersen 39'

Odense Stadion, Odense
Attendance: 1,763
Referee: Nicole Petignat (Switzerland)

26 September 2004

Denmark	6–0	Belgium
M. Pedersen 7', 12', 15', 86'; K. Pedersen 31'; Eggers Nielsen 68'	Report

Aalborg Stadion, Aalborg
Referee: Snježana Fočić (Croatia)

29 September 2004

Netherlands	1–5	Denmark
Ran 33'	Report (in Dutch)	M. Pedersen 15'; L. Jensen 45', 49'; Kjær Jensen 56', 59'

Nieuw Zuid, Katwijk
Attendance: 1,119
Referee: Christine Frai (Germany)

2 October 2004

Norway	2–0	Spain
R. Gulbrandsen 71'; Christensen 83'	Report

Kjølnes Stadion, Porsgrunn
Attendance: 682
Referee: Natalia Avdonchenko (Russia)

Denmark qualified for the final tournament.

Norway advanced for the playoff.

=== Group 3 ===
Team	Pts	Pld	W	D	L	GF	GA
France	21	8	7	0	1	32	7
Russia	17	8	5	2	1	22	8
Iceland	13	8	4	1	3	23	11
Hungary	4	8	1	1	6	6	28
Poland	2	8	0	2	6	7	36

19 April 2003

Poland	0–2	Hungary
	Report	Paraoanu 78'; Ruff 90+1'

Czechowice-Dziedzice, Poland
Attendance: 1,500
Referee: Katriina Elovirta (Finland)

11 May 2003

Hungary	0–4	France
	Report	Pichon 2', 57'; Lattaf 45+1', 87'

Kecskemét, Hungary
Attendance: 253
Referee: Sabrina Rinaldi (Italy)

18 May 2003

Russia	6–0	Poland
Barbashina 7', 90'; Stroukova 9'; Letyushova 34'; Svetliskaya 46'; Sergaeva 73'	Report

Moscow, Russia
Attendance: 1,200
Referee: Maria Trampusch (Austria)

14 June 2003

Iceland	4–1	Hungary
Hendriksdóttir 11'; Færseth 19'; Helgadóttir 60'; Viðarsdóttir 70'	Report	Nágy 38'

Reykjavík, Iceland
Attendance: 2,327
Referee: Aušra Tvarijonaitė (Lithuania)

9 August 2003

Russia	1–1	Iceland
Barbashina 18'	Report	Jóhannesdóttir 12'

Selyatino, Russia
Attendance: 600
Referee: Vibeke Karlsen (Norway)

8 September 2003

France	2–0	Iceland
Mugneret-Béghé 51'; Tonazzi 63'	Report

Bonneuil-sur-Marne, France
Attendance: 1,500
Referee: Christine Frai (Germany)

8 September 2003

Hungary	1–3	Russia
Agócs 72'	Report	Barbashina 10', 16'; Letyushova 90'

Dunaújváros, Hungary
Attendance: 600
Referee: Rita Ruiz Tacoronte (Spain)

13 September 2003

Iceland	10–0	Poland
Magnúsdóttir 8'; Hendríksdottir 13'; Jóhannesdóttir 18', 51'; Grétarsdóttir 32'; Viðarsdóttir 39', 42', 59'; Helgadóttir 68'; Lárusdóttir 76'	Report

Reykjavík, Iceland
Attendance: 983
Referee: Eva Ödlund (Sweden)

27 September 2003

Poland	2–3	Iceland
Zelazko 1'; Gawronska 61'	Report	Færseth 5'; Viðarsdóttir 41'; Helgadóttir 43'

Bydgoszcz, Poland
Attendance: 150
Referee: Snjezana Focic (Croatia)

15 November 2003

France	7–1	Poland
Woock 10'; Tonazzi 14'; Diacre 41'; Pichon 55', 58', 73'; Lattaf 67'	Report	Gibek 76'

Quimper, France
Attendance: 3,948
Referee: Claudine Brohet (Belgium)

24 April 2004

France	6–0	Hungary
Mugneret-Béghé 20'; Bompastor 30'; Pichon 34', 44', 72'; Tonazzi 88'	Report

Reims, France
Referee: Vibeke Karlsen (Norway)

1 May 2004

Hungary	2–2	Poland
Nágy 43'; Sebestyen 90'	Report	Winczo 11'; Otrebska 85'

Dunaújváros, Hungary
Referee: Antonia Kokotou (Greece)

8 May 2004

Poland	1–1	Russia
Zelazko 45'	Report	Letyushova 61'

Kwidzyn, Poland
Referee: Elke Günthner (Germany)

16 May 2004

Russia	0–3	France
	Report	Lattaf 17'; Pichon 78', 86'

Selyatino, Russia
Referee: Lale Orta (Turkey)

29 May 2004

Hungary	0–5	Iceland
	Report	Viðarsdóttir 12', 62'; Færseth 53', 60', 70'

Székesfehérvár, Hungary
Referee: Caroline De Boeck (Belgium)

2 June 2004

Iceland	0–3	France
	Report	Lattaf 4', 12'; Tonazzi 71'

Reykjavík, Iceland
Referee: Alexandra Ihringova (Slovakia)

22 August 2004

Iceland	0–2	Russia
	Report	Letyushova 55', 81'

Reykjavík, Iceland
Referee: Ilonka Milanova Djaleva (Bulgaria)

26 September 2004

France	2–5	Russia
Tonazzi 7'; Lattaf 77'	Report	Barbashina 2', 75', 86'; Fomina 42'; Letyushova 57'

Dijon, France
Referee: Jenny Palmqvist (Sweden)

3 October 2004

Russia	4–0	Hungary
Letyushova 43', 70'; Barbashina 54'; Fomina 66'	Report

Selyatino, Russia
Referee: Alexandra Ihringova (Slovakia)

3 October 2004

Poland	1–5	France
Pozerska 10'	Report	Pichon 17', 51', 58'; Herbert 52'; Diguelman 54'

Opole, Poland
Referee: Anna De Toni (Italy)

France qualified for the final tournament.

Russia and Iceland advanced for the playoff.

=== Group 4 ===
Team	Pts	Pld	W	D	L	GF	GA
Germany	24	8	8	0	0	50	2
Czech Republic	13	8	4	1	3	15	15
Scotland	12	8	4	0	4	19	16
Ukraine	7	8	2	1	5	7	21
Portugal	3	8	1	0	7	5	42

27 March 2003

Germany	5–0	Scotland
Prinz 25', 69'; Grings 40', 58', 65'	Report

Potsdam, Germany
Referee: Vibeke Karlsen (Norway)

10 May 2003

Ukraine	0–1	Portugal
	Report	Edite 60'

CSK ZSU Stadium, Kyiv
Referee: Alexandra Ihringová (Slovakia)

18 May 2003

Scotland	5–1	Ukraine
Ralph 37'; Brown 66'; Fleeting 76', 87', 90'	Report	Khodyreva 20'

Livingston, Scotland
Referee: Anri Saarivainio Hänninen (Finland)

7 June 2003

Portugal	1–8	Scotland
Inês Silva 64'	Report	Brown 8', 13'; Fleeting 21', 30', 32', 43', 67', 74'

Estádio Municipal de Nelas, Nelas
Referee: Nicole Petignat (Switzerland)

8 June 2003

Ukraine	1–1	Czech Republic
Apanaschenko 34'	Report	Pěničková 84'

Lutsk, Ukraine
Referee: Geja Mulder (Netherlands)

9 August 2003

Ukraine	1–3	Germany
Mazurenko 4'	Report	Garefrekes 41'; Minnert 71'; Müller 87'

Kyiv, Ukraine
Referee: Eva Ödlund (Sweden)

28 August 2003

Germany	4–0	Czech Republic
Gottschlich 45'; Minnert 71'; Prinz 75'; Müller 90+3'	Report

Passau, Germany
Referee: Anri Saarivainio Hänninen (Finland)

19 October 2003

Czech Republic	2–0	Scotland
Šcasná 45'; Mouchová 72'	Report

Kravare, Czech Republic
Referee: Caroline De Boeck (Belgium)

15 November 2003

Germany	13–0	Portugal
Fuss 9'; Minnert 31'; Garefrekes 45'; Prinz 46', 58', 63', 65'; Smisek 51'; Odebrecht 64'; Pohlers 77', 86'; Lingor 81'; Hingst 84'	Report

Stadion an der Kreuzeiche, Reutlingen
Referee: Wendy Toms (England)

6 December 2003

Portugal	0–1	Czech Republic
	Report	Pěničková 5'

Estádio Municipal de Pombal, Pombal
Referee: Anna de Toni (Italy)

7 February 2004

Portugal	0–11	Germany
	Report	Prinz 10', 36', 80'; Carla Monteiro 14' (o.g.); Grings 22', 61', 68', 70', 72'; Lingor 41' (pen.); Pohlers 89'

Estádio Municipal de Albufeira, Albufeira
Referee: Claudine Brohet (Belgium)

3 April 2004

Portugal	1–2	Ukraine
Tânia Pinto 12'	Report	Frishko 47'; Pekur 90+2'

Estádio do Bonfim, Setúbal
Referee: Gordana Kuzmanović (Serbia)

10 April 2004

Ukraine	1–0	Scotland
Djatel 89'	Report

Simferopol, Ukraine
Referee: Hilal Tuba Tosun (Turkey)

28 April 2004

Germany	6–0	Ukraine
Prinz 2', 71'; Bachor 31'; Minnert 40'; Smisek 45'; Wimbersky 89'	Report

Oldenburg, Germany
Referee: Rita Ruiz Tacoronte (Spain)

2 May 2004

Scotland	1–3	Germany
Fleeting 58'	Report	Garefrekes 29'; Prinz 75'; Müller 79'

Livingston, Scotland
Referee: Ilonka Milanova Djaleva (Bulgaria)

9 May 2004

Czech Republic	5–1	Portugal
Šmeralová 6'; Lucie Martínková 7'; Ščasná 52', 73'; Irena Martínková 85'	Report	Carla Couto 34'

Městský fotbalový stadion Miroslava Valenty, Uherské Hradiště
Referee: Bente Ovedie Skogvang (Norway)

23 May 2004

Scotland	2–1	Portugal
Grant 43'; Hamill 57'	Report	Sónia 87'

Almondvale Stadium, Livingston
Referee: Eva Ödlund (Sweden)

5 June 2004

Czech Republic	4–1	Ukraine
Ščasná 5', 63'; Došková 80'; Pěničková 90'	Report	Verezubova 90'

Roudnice nad Labem, Czech Republic
Referee: Snjezana Focic (Croatia)

5 September 2004

Scotland	3–2	Czech Republic
Malone 11'; Fleeting 82'; Jones 89'	Report	Mocová 58', 71'

Dingwall, Scotland
Referee: Lale Orta (Turkey)

25 September 2004

Czech Republic	0–5	Germany
	Report	Garefrekes 33'; Prinz 52'; Thompson 63'; Carlson 80'; Bertholdová 82' (o.g.)

Příbram, Czech Republic
Referee: Nicole Petignat (Switzerland)

Germany qualified for the final tournament.

Czech Republic advanced for the playoff.

== Second Category ==
=== Group 5 ===
Team	Pts	Pld	W	D	L	GF	GA
Republic of Ireland	18	8	5	3	0	35	5
Romania	18	8	5	3	0	29	5
Croatia	13	8	4	1	3	17	22
Bosnia and Herzegovina	7	8	2	1	5	4	19
Malta	0	8	0	0	8	1	35

19 April 2003

Bosnia and Herzegovina	0–1	Croatia
	Report	Baban 32'

Breza, Bosnia and Herzegovina
Referee: Martina Storch-Schäfer (Germany)

18 May 2003

Republic of Ireland	6–0	Bosnia and Herzegovina
O'Toole 19' (pen.), 45', 49' (pen.), 52'; O'Brien 58'; Curtis 90'	Report

Richmond Park, Dublin
Referee: Iwona Malek-wybraniec (Poland)

25 May 2003

Croatia	0–0	Republic of Ireland
	Report

ŠRC Velika Gorica, Velika Gorica
Referee: Antonia Kokotou (Greece)

28 June 2003

Republic of Ireland	2–2	Romania
O'Connor 45+4'; Grant 90+5'	Report	Pufulete 12', 76'

Tolka Park, Dublin
Referee: Tatjana Pavlovic (Serbia)

10 August 2003

Romania	3–0	Malta
Anton 55'; Spanu 70'; Talnar 90'	Report

Bucharest, Romania
Referee: Rachel Cohen (Israel)

24 September 2003

Bosnia and Herzegovina	1–0	Malta
Hurem 72'	Report

Hrasnica, Bosnia and Herzegovina
Referee: Hilal Tuba Tosun (Turkey)

28 September 2003

Croatia	3–0	Malta
Kusar 28'; Šundov 68'; Kozić 75'	Report

Vrbovec, Croatia
Referee: Irina Pavlova (Russia)

12 October 2003

Romania	2–0	Bosnia and Herzegovina
Spanu 45'; Pufulete 78'	Report

Câmpina, Romania
Referee: Sarah Girard (France)

18 October 2003

Croatia	2–3	Romania
Koljenik 36'; Kusar 75'	Report	Spanu 29'; Leu 63'; Pufulete 89'

Belišce, Croatia
Referee: Sabrina Rinaldi (Italy)

22 October 2003

Malta	0–9	Republic of Ireland
	Report	O'Toole 12', 24', 29'; Curtis 35', 43'; Hislop 62', 89'; Grant 78'; Tracy 84'

Ta' Qali National Stadium, Ta' Qali
Referee: Sabina De Nitto (Italy)

16 November 2003

Malta	1–4	Croatia
Caruana 90+2'	Report	Jakšić 17', 34', 70', 72'

Gozo Stadium, Gozo
Referee: Noëlle Robin (France)

10 April 2004

Republic of Ireland	8–1	Croatia
O'Toole 3'; Deasley 20', 88'; Hughes 40'; Curtis 44'; Horvat 59' (o.g.); Hislop 79', 80'	Report	Kozic 51'

Richmond Park, Dublin
Referee: Gyöngyi Gaál (Hungary)

1 May 2004

Romania	1–1	Republic of Ireland
Olar 45+1'	Report	Boyle 3'

Stadionul Mogoșoaia, Bucharest
Referee: Geja Mulder (Netherlands)

8 May 2004

Malta	0–8	Romania
	Report	Pufulete 5', 40', 41'; Spânu 6'; Leu 13', 27'; Anton 32'; Burtică 70'

Hamrun
Referee: Berta Tavares (Portugal)

9 May 2004

Bosnia and Herzegovina	1–4	Republic of Ireland
Pehić 58'	Report	O'Toole 30'; Hislop 44', 53'; Curtis 67'

Stadion Hakija Mrso, Vogošća
Referee: Rachel Cohen (Israel)

15 May 2004

Croatia	6–0	Bosnia and Herzegovina
Baban 5', 12'; Jakšić 28', 44'; Kušar 40'; Kozic 72' (pen.)	Report

By Sava, Slavonski Brod, Croatia
Referee: Zuzana Dohnanska (Slovakia)

25 June 2004

Republic of Ireland	5–0	Malta
O'Toole 12', 51' (pen.), 78'; O'Connor 28'; Grant 83'	Report

Dalymount Park, Dublin
Referee: Lena Arwedahl (Sweden)

5 September 2004

Malta	0–2	Bosnia and Herzegovina
	Report	Pehić 3', 31'

Ta' Qali National Stadium, Ta' Qali
Referee: Katalin Kulcsár (Hungary)

19 September 2004

Bosnia and Herzegovina	0–0	Romania
	Report

Bosnia and Herzegovina
Referee: Natalia Dorosheva (Kazakhstan)

2 October 2004

Romania	10–0	Croatia
Striblea 16', 28'; Anton 45' (pen.); Ciorba 54'; Pufulete 69', 73', 76', 77'; Leu 88'; Spânu 89'	Report

Otopeni
Referee: Paloma Quintero Siles (Spain)

=== Group 6 ===
Team	Pts	Pld	W	D	L	GF	GA
Belarus	16	6	5	1	0	21	3
Israel	11	6	3	2	1	20	6
Estonia	4	6	1	1	4	6	26
Kazakhstan	2	6	0	2	4	4	16
Wales	0	0	0	0	0	0	0

17 May 2003

Belarus	5–0	Estonia
Tatarinova 3'; Aniskovtseva 16', 21'; Kuznetsova 65'; Luchonak 90'	Report

Spartak Stadium, Mogilev

10 August 2003

Estonia	1–4	Israel
Pajo 34'	Report	Kochen 10'; Dayan 18'; Jan 44'; Shenar 53'

Pärnu Kalevi Staadion, Pärnu

24 August 2003

Estonia	3–2	Kazakhstan
Morkovkina 13', 43'; Pajo 52'	Report	Yalova 4'; Teterina 57'

Pärnu Kalevi Staadion, Pärnu

14 September 2003

Kazakhstan	0–0	Israel
	Report

Almaty

18 October 2003

Belarus	1–1	Israel
Lis 89'	Report	Liran 78'

Spartak Stadium, Mogilev

9 May 2004

Israel	12–1	Estonia
Israel 6'; Didich 12'; Ohana 29', 65', 76'; Jan 46', 62', 68', 71', 84'; Dayan 49', 66'	Report	Vaher 69'

Tel Aviv

25 May 2004

Kazakhstan	0–2	Belarus
	Report

Astana

30 May 2004

Israel	3–1	Kazakhstan
Fahima 23'; Jan 44' (pen.); Dayan 56'	Report	Yalova 38'

Herzliya

25 August 2004

Belarus	8–1	Kazakhstan
Kuzniatsova 5', 47'; Aniskovtseva 39', 54', 90+4'; Davydovich 52'; Lis 63'; Vovikava 89'	Report	Yalova 62'

Traktor Stadium, Minsk

29 August 2004

Estonia	1–3	Belarus
Morkovkina 72'	Report	Lis 17', 33'; Tatarinova 26'

Pärnu Kalevi Staadion, Pärnu

19 September 2004

Kazakhstan	0–0	Estonia
	Report

Astana

2 October 2004

Israel	0–2	Belarus
	Report	Kuzniatsova 42', 90+2'

Rishon-leZion

Wales withdrew.

=== Group 7 ===
Team	Pts	Pld	W	D	L	GF	GA
Austria	15	6	5	0	1	31	4
Greece	13	6	4	1	1	23	6
Slovakia	7	6	2	1	3	20	11
Armenia	0	6	0	0	6	0	53

10 May 2003

Austria	11–0	Armenia
Schaffranek 7', 55', 74'; Stallinger 18', 78'; Fuhrmann 38'; Gstöttner 44'; Hanschitz 48'; Spieler 51', 84'; Fischer 83'

Austria

13 May 2003

Armenia	0–11	Austria
		Hanschitz 3'; Hufnahl 8', 19'; Stallinger 29', 40', 70', 74'; Hochstöger 49'; Spieler 52'; Gstöttner 63', 66'

Armenia

9 September 2003

Slovakia	5–0	Armenia
Lukácsová 16'; Gajdosová 19'; Felingová 21', 45'; Petrusová 85'

Slovakia

12 September 2003

Armenia	0–10	Slovakia
		Felingová 20'; Izová 28', 38', 90'; Gharibyan 36' (o.g.); Giraseková 51', 57'; Budosová 55'; Petrusová 75'; Hanzelová 80'

Armenia

25 October 2003

Greece	7–0	Armenia
Panteliadou 11', 19'; Katsaiti 38', 53', 57'; Soupiadou 48'; Lazarou 67'

Greece

28 October 2003

Armenia	0–9	Greece
		Arvanitaki 5', 75'; Panteliadou 8', 10', 13', 15'; Soupiadou 48'; Katsaiti 53', 80'

Thiva, Greece

15 November 2003

Greece	3–1	Slovakia
Michailidou 10'; Lagoumtzki 15'; Kalyvas 24'		Felingová 75'

Greece

29 November 2003

Greece	0–2	Austria
		Aigner 7'; Spieler 43'

Greece

24 April 2004

Austria	1–2	Greece
Fischer 89'		Chatzigiannidou 38'; Michailidou 56'

Austria

29 April 2004

Slovakia	2–2	Greece
Králiková 44'; Izova 84'		Chatzigiannidou 6'; Kalyvas 40'

Slovakia

8 May 2004

Austria	3–0	Slovakia
Stallinger 26' (pen.); Hufnagl 48'; Gstöttner 78'

Austria

21 August 2004

Slovakia	2–3	Austria
Hanzelova 24'; Bojdová 50'		Aigner 69', 84'; Stallinger 89'

Slovakia

== Playoff ==
Team 1	Agg.	Team 2	1st leg	2nd leg
Finland	4–1	Russia	1–0	3–1
Iceland	3–9	Norway	2–7	1–2
Italy	5–1	Czech Republic	2–1	3–0

=== First leg ===
16 October 2004
14:00 EET

Finland	1–0	Russia
Kalmari 66'	Report

Jakobstads Centralplan, Jakobstad
Referee: Floarea Ionescu (Romania)

10 November 2004
17:00 WET

Iceland	2–7	Norway
Jónsdóttir 72'; Viðarsdóttir 80'	Report	S. Gulbrandsen 4', 26', 68'; Mellgren 22'; R. Gulbrandsen 39', 55'; Hendriksdottir 90+2' (o.g.)

Egilshöllin, Reykjavík
Referee: Claudine Brohet (Belgium)

13 November 2004
15:00 CET

Italy	2–1	Czech Republic
Zorri 8'; Tuttino 30'	Report	Ščasná 46'

Stadio Ezio Scida, Crotone
Referee: Lale Orta (Turkey)

=== Second leg ===
20 October 2004
15:00 MT

Russia	1–3	Finland
Barbashina 62'	Report	Mäkinen 23'; Salmén 41', 56'

Moskvich Stadium, Moscow
Referee: Nicole Petignat (Switzerland)

Finland won 4–1 on aggregate.

13 November 2004
15:00 CET

Norway	2–1	Iceland
Mellgren 22', 79'	Report	Kristinsdottir 68'

Vallhall Arena, Oslo
Referee: Christine Frai (Germany)

Norway won 9–3 on aggregate.

27 November 2004
13:30 CET

Czech Republic	0–3	Italy
	Report	Pasqui 6'; Panico 79'; Camporese 90+1'

Stadion pod Hrádkem, Čáslav
Referee: Eva Ödlund (Sweden)

Italy won 5–1 on aggregate.

Finland, Norway and Italy qualified for the final tournament.

== Top goalscorers ==
Rank	Name	Goals	Minutes played
1	(Germany) Birgit Prinz	14	630'
2	(France) Marinette Pichon	13	630'
3	(Republic of Ireland) Olivia O'Toole	12	561'
4	(Scotland) Julie Fleeting	11	720'
4	(Romania) Daniela Simona Pufulete	11	720'
6	(Russia) Natalia Barbashina	10	900'
7	(Germany) Inka Grings	8	226'
7	(Austria) Gertrud Stallinger	8	540'
7	(Iceland) Margrét Lára Viðarsdóttir	8	640'
7	(Russia) Olga Letyushova	8	799'
