= List of Austria women's international footballers =

This is a list of women's Austrian association footballers who have played for the Austria women's national football team since the first match in 1990.

== Players ==
As of 31 October 2013 after the match against France

Name	Caps	Goals	National team years	Club(s)
Adamovics Doris	6		2008–2009	FC Wacker Innsbruck
Aigner Nina	40	11	1998–2010	Union Kleinmünchen Linz (7), USC Landhaus Wien (7), FC Bayern München (26)
Allram Helga	2		1992–1994	Vienna (1), DFC Heidenreichstein (1)
Aschauer Andrea	1		2001	ASK Salzburg
Aschauer Verena	13	2	2011–2013	Herforder SV (2), BV Cloppenburg (11)
Auinger Brigitte	1		1999	ATSV Sattledt
Babicky Gina	1		2012	ASV Spratzern
Bauer Caroline	1		1996	SV Horn
Bell Romina	5		2010–2013	SV Neulengbach
Belschak Kathrin	1		2002	1. DFC Leoben
Berger Isabella	12		2007–2009	USC Landhaus Wien (11), Herforder SV (1)
Bergwein Karin	1		1998	DFC Heidenreichstein
Billa Nicole	2		2013	ASV Spratzern
Binder Manuela	21	3	1990–1997	USC Landhaus Wien
Bitsche Elisabeth	12		1996–2000	RW Rankweil (4), SC Rüthi (8)
Bouchehiou Sara	4		1997–1998	RW Rankweil (1), SC Rüthi (3)
Brandmaier Barbara	8	1	1992–1996	Innsbrucker AC (6), USC Landhaus Wien (2)
Bruckner Isabella	1		1992	Vienna
Burger Christa	2		1990–1991	USC Landhaus Wien
Burger Nina	50	29	2005–2013	SV Neulengbach
Celouch Natascha	13	5	2002–2009	SV Neulengbach
Cito Ramona	1	1	1995	FC Mäder
Dopler Astrid	1		2012	USC Landhaus Wien
Eder Jasmin	12		2011–2013	FC Bayern München (1), BV Cloppenburg (7), VfL Sindelfingen (4)
Eder Sabine	40		1994–2004	USC Landhaus Wien
Edinger Brigitta	1		1996	Union Kleinmünchen Linz
Entacher Brigitte	32	4	1992–1999	Innsbrucker AC
Entner Kathrin	23	1	2009–2012	SV Neulengbach
Falkner Helene	21	1	1992–1996	TSU Inzing (4), Innsbrucker AC (15), USC Landhaus Wien (2)
Faustenhammer Ines	36		1994–2006	USC Landhaus Wien (34), SV Neulengbach (2)
Fazekas Ilse	23	1	1990–1996	SC Neunkirchen (3), USC Landhaus Wien (20)
Feiersinger Laura	27	6	2010–2013	USK Hof (2), Herforder SV (1), FC Bayern München (24)
Fellinger Heidrun	5		1992–1998	ESV Ostbahn XI Wien (1), ASV Vösendorf (4)
Fischer Melanie	20	2	2002–2011	SV Neulengbach (7), FC Bayern München (6), SG Ardagger/Neustadtl (3), FC Wacker Innsbruck (4)
Förber Karin	2		2003–2004	SG Ardagger/Neustadtl (1), DFC LUV Graz (1)
Fuetsch Claudia	4		1993–1994	Innsbrucker AC
Fuhrmann Irene	22	3	2001–2008	USC Landhaus Wien (19), Innsbrucker AC (3)
Fukerieder Karin	2		1990–1996	SC Brunn am Gebirge, SV Horn (1)
Gagony Claudia	2		1990–1992	ESV Ostbahn XI Wien
Gahleitner Berta	5		1991–1993	Union Kleinmünchen Linz
Gahleitner Paula	7		1991–1993	Union Kleinmünchen Linz
Gahleitner Susanna	20		2003–2010	SV Neulengbach (5), SG Ardagger/Neustadtl (15)
Gasser Astrid	1		1997	SV Rapid Lienz
Gatternig Nicole	6		2009–2011	SK Kelag Kärnten
Gradl Daniela	8		1996–1998	USV Leopoldskron-Moos
Graf Sandra	1		2008	USC Landhaus Wien
Greimer Bibiane	1		2001	1. DFC Leoben
Greipl Sabine	1		1990	SC Brunn am Gebirge
Gröbner Marion	41	9	2003–2013	SG Ardagger/Neustadtl (4), Union Kleinmünchen Linz (4), USC Landhaus Wien (17), Herforder SV (11), Medkila Idrettslag (4), FSV Gütersloh (1)
Grössinger Isabella	8		2009–2013	USK Hof (6), SG FC Bergheim/USK Hof (1), ASV Spratzern (1)
Grutsch Heidrun	21	1	1994–2001	RW Rankweil (8), Bad Ragaz (5), FC Staad (6), SC Rüthi (2)
Gstöttner Maria	36	5	2000–2013	SV Neulengbach
Gumpenberger Birgit	1		2008	SV Neulengbach
Haas Angelika	2		1997	ESV Saalfelden
Haas Cornelia	9	2	2006–2012	DFC LUV Graz
Hajszan Elisabeth	3		1991–1997	SC Brunn am Gebirge (2), ASV Vösendorf (1)
Hämmerle Birgit	1		1994	FC Widnau
Hämmerle Dagmar	1		1995	FC Mäder
Hämmerle Elke	1		1994	FC Widnau
Hanschitz Marlies	45	8	2003–2013	ATSV St. Margarethen (4), Innsbrucker AC (4), FC Wacker Tirol/FC Wacker Innsbruck (32), SK Kelag Kärnten (2), FC St. Veit (3)
Hetzenauer Andrea	5		1995–1996	TSU Inzing (1), FC Schwarzach (4)
Hochstöger Isabel	19	1	1999–2003	Union Kleinmünchen Linz (9), USC Landhaus Wien (7), Innsbrucker AC (3)
Höglinger Sonja	1		1995	Union Kleinmünchen Linz
Höller Susanna	38		2008–2013	DFC LUV Graz (4), VfL Sindelfingen (34)
Höllmüller Kathrin	14		2007–2010	SG Ardagger/Neustadtl
Huber Nadja	3		1993–1994	Innsbrucker AC
Hufnagl Birgitt	30	5	1997–2007	SV Neulengbach (20), Duisburg (6), CF Bardolino (1), USC Landhaus Wien (3)
Ilic Liljana	2		1998–1999	SV Neulengbach
Jud Natascha	2		1995–1997	ASV Siegendorf (1), ASV Vösendorf (1)
Junger Andrea	2		1997	ESV Saalfelden
Just Susanne	12		2001–2006	SV Garsten (3), SG Ardagger/Neustadtl (2), SV Neulengbach (7)
Kabes Ursula	7		1991–1998	First Vienna FC 1894 (4), ASV Vösendorf (3)
Kaltenbrunner Veronika	5		1992–1994	TSU Inzing
Kastner Maria	1		1990	Union Kleinmünchen Linz
Katzian Martina	1		1991	DFC Heidenreichstein
Kern Ramona	2		2010	DFC LUV Graz
Kirchberger Virginia	17		2010–2013	FC Bayern München (6), BV Cloppenburg (11)
Kirchmann Brigitte	2		1993–1994	RW Rankweil
Kirchmann Jasmine	1		2011	FC Staad
Kneisz Teresa	2		2009–2010	FC Südburgenland
Knobel Sabine	1		1999	SC Rüthi
Koch Susanna	11	1	2006–2011	FC Südburgenland
Kollmann Eva	2		1991	1. DFC Leoben
Kopatz Ilse	3		2002–2004	SG Spratzern/Stattersdorf (1), SV Neulengbach (1), USC Landhaus Wien (1)
Kristler Anna-Carina	18		2009–2013	FC St. Veit (6), SK Kelag Kärnten (2), SK Sturm Graz Damen/Stattegg (9)
Krivohlavek Yvonne	4	1	1999–2002	ESV Südost (2), USC Landhaus Wien (2)
Kröll Simone	4		1998–2001	SV Oberteuringen (3), TSV Tettnang (1)
Kühnel Petra	12		1995–1998	USC Landhaus Wien
Legenstein Tanja	8		2007–2009	ASK Erlaa
Leitner Birgit	27		2001–2009	USK Hof (11), FC Bayern München (16)
Leitner Eveline	1		1990	USC Landhaus Wien
Lorenz Andrea	7		2001–2006	USC Landhaus Wien
Makas Lisa	27	9	2010–2013	SKV Altenmarkt (5), ASV Spratzern/FSK St. Pölten (22)
Manhart Heike	19	2	2010–2013	DFC LUV Graz (3), FC Südburgenland (7), SK Sturm Graz Damen/Stattegg (4), Viktória Szombathely (5)
Metzler Cäcillia	5		2005–2006	Innsbrucker AC (2), FC Wacker Tirol (3)
Misch Katja	1		1999	USC Landhaus Wien
Mühlberger Sabine	3		1996–1997	SC Harham (2), ESV Saalfelden (1)
Münzer Mariella	1		1991	1. DFC Leoben
Obersteiner Sybille	3		1999–2000	USC Landhaus Wien
Ortmaier Petra	6		1994–1999	Union Kleinmünchen Linz
Pazour Michaela	5		1994–1995	ESV Ostbahn XI Wien
Pfaffeneder Sonja	1		2007	FC Wacker Innsbruck
Pfeiler Jasmin	19		2009–2013	SV Neulengbach (11), SKV Altenmarkt (8)
Piribauer Petra	2		1991–1994	SC Neunkirchen
Pöltl Jennifer	15	1	2010–2013	FC Südburgenland (6), ASV Spratzern/FSK St. Pölten (5), ETSU Buccaneers (4)
Pregartbauer Katharina	26		1997–2006	1. DFC Leoben (20), FC Staad (2). Innsbrucker AC (4)
Preiss Alexandra	3		1990–2002	1. DFC Leoben (2), SV Neulengbach (1)
Prohaska Nadine	36	2	2008–2013	SV Neulengbach (1), FC Bayern München (19), ASV Spratzern/FSK St. Pölten (16)
Prvulovic Jelena	2		2013	USC Landhaus (1)
Puntigam Sarah	35	6	2009–2013	DFC LUV Graz (4), FC Bayern München (21), SC Kriens (9)
Pusemann Tanja	1		2001	SV Neulengbach
Rafael Susanne	6	1	1990–1992	USC Landhaus Wien
Rappold Mariella	11	1	2009–2012	DFC LUV Graz
Reischer Bianca	10		2005–2011	SV Neulengbach (6), USC Landhaus Wien (3), ASV Spratzern (1)
Riederer Judith	2		1992	Union Kleinmünchen Linz
Riedmüller Maria	1		1990	1. DFC Leoben
Ruiss Ines	5		2008–2011	SV Neulengbach
Sam Eva	3		1991–1992	DFC Heidenreichstein
Schaffranek Michaela	11	3	1996–2004	USC Landhaus Wien (9), SV Neulengbach (2)
Scheidbach Barbara	1		1992	Austria Lustenau
Scheubmayr Elke	37	13	1991–2001	RW Rankweil (8), FC Modena (17), CF Bardolino (2), Innsbrucker AC (10)
Schnaderbeck Viktoria	27	1	2007–2013	DFC LUV Graz (1), FC Bayern München (26)
Seibezeder Iris	21		1997–2003	Union Kleinmünchen Linz
Seidl Gabriele	20	1	1993–1996	ESV Ostbahn XI Wien (9), ESV Südost (11)
Smolka Sabine	2		1991	Vienna
Spieler Sonja	62	10	1993–2010	FC Schwarzach (20), SV Oberteuringen (14), TSV Tettnang (6), FC Bayern München (20), FC Staad (2)
Spinner Elisabeth	3		1990–1991	SC Brunn am Gebirge
Spitzbart Anna	8		1994–1995	ATSV Sattledt
Stallinger Gertrud	56	30	1990–2005	Union Kleinmünchen Linz (42), FC Bayern München (14)
Stangl Elfriede	9		1995–1999	1. DFC Leoben
Steffan Daniela	1		1997	Innsbrucker AC
Stehrer Anke	10	1	1999–2004	1. DFC Leoben (5), Innsbrucker AC (5)
Straka Kerstin	2		2007	Tennis Borussia Berlin
Strass Silvia	2		1998–1999	SV Neulengbach
Strauchs Katharina	2		2009	SG Ardagger/Neustadtl
Szabados Andrea	6		1992–1996	TSU Inzing (2), Innsbrucker AC (4)
Szankovich Alexandra	24	1	1997–2004	USC Landhaus Wien
Tabotta Julia	2		2013	ASV Spratzern
Tasch Daniela	9	2	2007–2011	DFC LUV Graz (1), SV Neulengbach (8)
Tieber Elisabeth	11	1	2008–2013	DFC LUV Graz (2), USC Landhaus Wien (2), VfL Sindelfingen (7)
Trauner Roswitha	3		1991–1992	USC Landhaus Wien
Trödthandl Katja	14		2006–2013	SV Neulengbach (2), USC Landhaus Wien (8), Valencia CF Femenino (4)
Urbanek Astrid	14		1992–1995	USC Landhaus Wien
Walzl Katrin	15	1	2004–2011	SV Groß Scheinbarth (1), USC Landhaus Wien (12), ASV Spratzern (2)
Wegebauer Gabriela	2		1996–1997	USC Landhaus Wien
Weinhofer Marion	7		1998–2002	ASV Nickelsdorf (2), USC Landhaus Wien (5)
Wenninger Carina	39	2	2007–2013	DFC LUV Graz (2), FC Bayern München (37)
Wimmer Rosa	26	1	1990–1996	Union Kleinmünchen Linz
Winter Nike	4		2009–2010	SK Kelag Kärnten
Zadrazil Sarah	10		2010–2013	USK Hof (3), SG FC Bergheim/USK Hof (1), ETSU Buccaneers (6)
Zanona Bianca	1		1998	Innsbrucker AC
Zehetbauer Claudia	1		1990	ESV Ostbahn XI Wien
Zeitelberger Gerlinde	2		1995–1998	SV Horn (1), DFC Heidenreichstein (1)
Zinsberger Manuela	3		2013	SV Neulengbach
Zötsch Christa	3	1	1990–1991	1. DFC Leoben

== See also ==
- Austria women's national football team
- List of Austria international footballers
