= 2011 FIFA Women's World Cup qualification – UEFA Group 5 =

Football tournament qualification stage

The 2011 FIFA Women's World Cup qualification UEFA Group 5 was a UEFA qualifying group for the 2011 FIFA Women's World Cup. The group comprised England, Spain, Austria, Turkey and Malta.

England won the group and advanced to the play-off rounds.

== Standings ==
Team	Pld	W	D	L	GF	GA	GD	Pts	England	Spain	Austria	Turkey	Malta
England	8	7	1	0	30	2	+28	22	—	1–0	3–0	3–0	8–0
Spain	8	6	1	1	37	4	+33	19	2–2	—	2–0	5–1	9–0
Austria	8	3	1	4	14	12	+2	10	0–4	0–1	—	4–0	6–0
Turkey	8	2	1	5	10	23	−13	7	0–3	0–5	2–2	—	5–1
Malta	8	0	0	8	1	51	−50	0	0–6	0–13	0–2	0–2	—

== Results ==
19 September 2009
17:00 UTC+2

Malta	0–13	Spain
	Report	Meseguer 6'; Martín 11', 19', 30', 51'; Bermúdez 26', 36', 38'; Romero 31', 68', 90+3'; Boquete 53', 75'

Centenary Stadium, Ta' Qali
Referee: Silvia Tea Spinelli (Italy)

24 October 2009
12:00 UTC+2

Spain	2–0	Austria
Bermúdez 20'; Martín 32'	Report

Estadio Nuevo Arcángel, Córdoba
Referee: Natalia Avdonchenko (Russia)

25 October 2009
17:30 UTC±0

England	8–0	Malta
F. White 8'; F. Williams 21', 39', 66'; Clarke 37', 76'; Westwood 78'; Unitt 87'	Report

Bloomfield Road, Blackpool
Attendance: 3,681
Referee: Florence Guillemin (France)

29 October 2009
19:00 UTC+1

Austria	0–1	Spain
	Report	Martín 49'

Ertl Glas Stadion, Amstetten
Referee: Bibiana Steinhaus (Germany)

18 November 2009
14:30 UTC+1

Malta	0–2	Austria
	Report	Aigner 11', 48'

Centenary Stadium, Ta' Qali
Referee: Paula Thörn (Sweden)

21 November 2009
14:00 UTC+2

Turkey	0–5	Spain
	Report	Martín 47', 50' (pen.), 53'; Bermúdez 78'; Boquete 82'

Manisa 19 Mayıs Stadium, Manisa
Referee: Aneliya Sinabova (Bulgaria)

26 November 2009
14:00 UTC+2

Turkey	0–3	England
	Report	A. Scott 77'; Sanderson 81'; Unitt 85'

Buca Arena, İzmir
Referee: Sandra Braz Bastos (Portugal)

25 March 2010
19:00 UTC±0

England	3–0	Austria
Sanderson 16'; Aluko 67'; E. White 90'	Report

Loftus Road, London
Attendance: 3,980
Referee: Caroline De Boeck (Belgium)

27 March 2010
15:00 UTC+1

Malta	0–2	Turkey
	Report	Uraz 22', 57'

Centenary Stadium, Ta' Qali
Referee: Irina Tereshchenko (Russia)

1 April 2010
19:00 UTC+1

England	1–0	Spain
Chapman 30'	Report

The New Den, London
Attendance: 5,041
Referee: Christina Westrum Pedersen (Norway)

7 April 2010
19:00 UTC+2

Spain	5–1	Turkey
Bermúdez 29'; Martín 31', 70'; Torrejón 36'; Olabarrieta 40'	Report	Elgalp 55'

Estadio Pedro Escartín, Guadalajara
Referee: Zuzana Kováčová (Slovakia)

11 April 2010
14:30 UTC+3

Turkey	5–1	Malta
Yağ 7', 41'; Uraz 39', 61'; Defterli 45+2'	Report	Pace 49'

Hüseyin Avni Aker Stadium, Trabzon
Referee: Irina Turovskaya (Belarus)

20 May 2010
15:00 UTC+2

Malta	0–6	England
	Report	F. White 7'; K. Smith 15'; F. Williams 29', 82'; Clarke 56'; E. White 67'

Centenary Stadium, Ta' Qali
Referee: Marte Soro (Norway)

9 June 2010
19:00 UTC+2

Austria	6–0	Malta
Makas 3', 53', 68'; Gröbner 10', 90+1'; Hanschitz 59'	Report

Donaustadion, Ottensheim
Referee: Yuliya Medvedeva-Keldyusheva (Kazakhstan)

19 June 2010
19:15 UTC+2

Spain	2–2	England
Martín 16'; Bermúdez 67'	Report	Unitt 78'; F. White 88'

Estadio El Montecillo, Aranda de Duero
Attendance: 2,800
Referee: Jenny Palmqvist (Sweden)

23 June 2010
18:30 UTC+2

Austria	4–0	Turkey
Burger 8'; Makas 10'; Feiersinger 45'; Gröbner 49'	Report

Anger Stadium, Anger
Referee: Gordana Kuzmanović (Serbia)

24 June 2010
20:30 UTC+2

Spain	9–0	Malta
Martín 17', 47', 61', 72'; Ibarra 49', 80'; Alharilla 77'; Pace 86' (o.g.); Boquete 90'	Report

Estadio La Albuera, Segovia
Referee: Knarik Grigoryan (Armenia)

29 July 2010
19:00 UTC+1

England	3–0	Turkey
Yankey 23'; E. White 62'; Clarke 78'	Report

Bescot Stadium, Walsall
Attendance: 5,457
Referee: Floarea Babadac-Ionescu (Romania)

21 August 2010
17:00 UTC+2

Austria	0–4	England
	Report	K. Smith 7', 30'; A. Scott 40'; E. White 80'

Sepp-Doll-Stadion, Krems an der Donau
Referee: Kirsi Heikkinen (Finland)

25 August 2010
19:00 UTC+3

Turkey	2–2	Austria
Defterli 22'; Yağ 51' (pen.)	Report	Burger 66'; Makas 82'

Samsun 19 Mayıs Stadium, Samsun
Referee: Katalin Kulcsar (Hungary)
