= Jasmin Pfeiler =

Austrian footballer

Personal information
- Date of birth: 28 July 1984 (age 42)
- Place of birth: Vienna, Austria
- Height: 1.84 m (6 ft 0 in)
- Position: Goalkeeper

Team information
- Current team: SKV Altenmarkt
- Number: 1

Senior career*
Years	Team	Apps	(Gls)
2009–2010	SV Neulengbach	0	(0)
2011–2014	SKV Altenmarkt	22	(0)
2015	SV Neulengbach	9	(0)
2015–	SKV Altenmarkt	18	(0)

International career
2011–	Austria	9	(0)
- * Club domestic league appearances and goals

Jasmin Pfeiler (born 28 July 1984) is an Austrian footballer who plays as a goalkeeper for SKV Altenmarkt in the ÖFB-Frauenliga.

== Career ==
=== Club ===
Pfeiler signed with SV Neulengbach in 2009. However, she never did play a match for the team. In 2011, Pfeiler moved to SKV Altenmarkt, where she played for four years. In January 2015, Pfeiler briefly returned to SV Neulengbach where she played nine matches until June 2015, when she definitively moved back to SKV Altenmarkt.

=== International ===
Pfeiler was the starter goalie for Austria, during the team's campaign in the 2011 FIFA Women's World Cup qualification. She started seven out of the eight matches, Austria played in the competition. The team finished third in Group B and didn't qualify for the World Cup. In the qualification for the UEFA Women's Euro 2013, Pfeiler was the reserve goalie, behind Anna-Carina Kristler. She only played two matches and Austria was eliminated by Russia in the Play-off round. In 2017. Pfeiler was included in the 23-women squad who represented Austria and reached the semi-finals at the UEFA Women's Euro 2017.
