= List of FC Bayern Munich (women) seasons =

This is a list of seasons played by Bayern Munich Frauen, FC Bayern Munich's women's section in German and European football, from the foundation of the first German championship, four years after the team was created, to the latest completed season.

== Key ==
- Rank = Final position
- Pld = Matches played
- W = Matches won
- D = Matches drawn
- L = Matches lost
- GF = Goals for
- GA = Goals against
- GD = Goal difference
- Pts = Points
- Cup = DFB-Pokal (women)
- Europe = European competition entered
- R32 = Round of 32
- R16 = Round of 16
- QF = Quarter-finals
- SF = Semi-finals
- RU = Runners-up
- W = Champions

Top scorers in bold were also the top scorers in the Frauen-Bundesliga that season.

Champions *	Runners-up ¤	Promoted ↑	Relegated ↓

== Seasons ==
Domestic and international results of FC Bayern Munich Frauen
Season	League										Cup	Europe		Other Comp.	Top scorer(s)	
Season	Division	Tier	Pos	Pld	W	D	L	GF	GA	Pts	Cup	Europe		Other Comp.	Player(s)	Goals
1973–74	FRG Championship		R16													
1974–75	FRG Championship		RU ¤													
1975–76	FRG Championship		W *													
1976–77	FRG Championship		SF													
1977–78	FRG Championship		QF													
1978–79	FRG Championship		RU ¤													
1979–80	FRG Championship		RU ¤													
1980–81	FRG Championship		R16													
1981–82	FRG Championship		RU ¤													
1982–83	FRG Championship		QF								QF					
1983–84	FRG Championship		SF													
1984–85	FRG Championship		RU ¤								SF					
1986–87	FRG Championship		QF								QF					
1987–88	FRG Championship		R16								RU ¤					
1988–89	FRG Championship		R16								QF					
1989–90	FRG Championship		SF								RU ¤					
1990–91	Bundesliga Süd	1	**4**	18	7	6	5	21	14	20	SF					
1991–92	Bundesliga Süd	1	**11** ↓	20	2	5	13	14	22	9	R32					
1992–93	Bayernliga	2	**2**					57	19	28	R32					
1993–94	Bayernliga	2	**3**					26	19	22	R32					
1994–95	Bayernliga	2	**2**					32	14	25						
1995–96	Bayernliga	2	**3**					31	33	21						
1996–97	Bayernliga	2	**4**					16	22	12						
1997–98	Bayernliga	2	**4**					10	16	10						
1998–99	Bayernliga	2	**2**					58	29	32						
1999–2000	Bayernliga	2	**1** ↑	18	18	0	0	128	8	54						
2000–01	Bundesliga	1	**6**	22	10	3	9	45	52	33	QF				(Germany) Petra Wimbersky	13
2001–02	Bundesliga	1	**4**	22	12	4	6	59	38	40	R16				(Czech Republic) Pavlina Ščasná	14
2002–03	Bundesliga	1	**5**	22	11	4	7	45	32	37	QF				(Austria) Nina Aigner	17
2003–04	Bundesliga	1	**5**	22	10	4	8	53	36	34	R16				(Austria) Nina Aigner	16
2004–05	Bundesliga	1	**4**	22	10	3	9	39	37	33	SF				(Czech Republic) Pavlina Ščasná	10
2005–06	Bundesliga	1	**8**	22	8	3	11	41	48	27	SF				(Czech Republic) P. Ščasná & (Germany) J. Simic	7
2006–07	Bundesliga	1	**4**	22	12	2	8	35	29	38	R16				(Austria) Nina Aigner	15
2007–08	Bundesliga	1	**4**	22	12	2	8	53	38	38	SF				(Austria) Nina Aigner	16
2008–09	Bundesliga	1	**2** ¤	22	17	3	2	67	19	54	R16				(Austria) Nina Aigner	17
2009–10	Bundesliga	1	**4**	22	12	3	7	42	35	39	R16	Champions League	R16		(Switzerland) Vanessa Bürki	9
2010–11	Bundesliga	1	**5**	22	11	2	9	42	36	35	SF				(Germany) Petra Wimbersky	9
2011–12	Bundesliga	1	**6**	22	8	4	10	29	30	28	W *				(United States) Sarah Hagen	5
2012–13	Bundesliga	1	**4**	22	14	1	7	49	24	43	SF				(Germany) Lena Lotzen	14
2013–14	Bundesliga	1	**4**	22	17	4	1	49	27	39	R16				(United States) Sarah Hagen	12
2014–15	Bundesliga	1	**1** *	22	17	5	0	56	7	56	QF				(United States) Katie Stengel	9
2015–16	Bundesliga	1	**1** *	22	18	3	1	47	8	57	SF	Champions League	R32		(Netherlands) Vivianne Miedema	14
2016–17	Bundesliga	1	**2** ¤	22	17	1	4	36	15	52	QF	Champions League	QF		(Netherlands) Vivianne Miedema	14
2017–18	Bundesliga	1	**2** ¤	22	17	2	3	62	15	53	**RU** ¤	Champions League	R32		(Sweden) Fridolina Rolfö	9
2018–19	Bundesliga	1	**2** ¤	22	17	4	1	75	18	55	SF	Champions League	SF		(Germany) Sara Däbritz	13
2019–20	Bundesliga	1	**2** ¤	22	17	3	2	60	14	54	R16	Champions League	QF		(Serbia) Jovana Damnjanović	11
2020–21	Bundesliga	1	**1** *	22	20	1	1	82	9	61	SF	Champions League	SF		(Germany) Lea Schüller	16
2021–22	Bundesliga	1	**2** ¤	22	18	1	3	78	18	55	SF	Champions League	QF		(Germany) **Lea Schüller**	16
2022–23	Bundesliga	1	**1** *	22	19	2	1	67	8	59	SF	Champions League	QF		(Germany) Lea Schüller	14
2023–24	Bundesliga	1	**1** *	22	19	3	0	60	8	60	**RU**	Champions League	GS		(Germany) Lea Schüller	11
2024–25	Bundesliga	1	**1** *	22	19	2	1	56	13	59	W *	Champions League	QF		(Denmark) Pernille Harder	14
2025–26	Bundesliga	1	**1** *	26	24	2	0	90	9	74	W *	Champions League	SF		(Denmark) Pernille Harder	16

- References: Top scorers — Championship / Bundesliga — Cup
