= Carla Cristina =

Portuguese footballer (born 1974)

Personal information
- Full name: Carla Cristina Trindade Aco Correia
- Date of birth: 25 May 1974 (age 52)
- Position: Goalkeeper

International career^{‡}
Years	Team	Apps	(Gls)
1995–2006	Portugal	82	(0)
- ‡ National team caps and goals as of 23 September 2006

Carla Cristina Trindade Aco Correia (born 25 May 1974), known as Carla Cristina, is a Portuguese former footballer who played as a goalkeeper. She has been a member of the Portugal women's national team.

== International career ==
On 15 November 2003, Carla Cristina conceded 13 goals in a UEFA Women's Euro 2005 qualifying match against Germany, who had just won the FIFA Women's World Cup the month before. That 0–13 loss is still the biggest defeat in Portugal women's national football team history.
