= Entner =

Entner is a surname. Notable people with the surname include:

- Kathrin Entner (born 1988), Austrian footballer
- Warren Entner (born 1944), American singer, songwriter, organist and guitarist
