= Cansu Yağ =

Turkish women's football midfielder (born 1990)

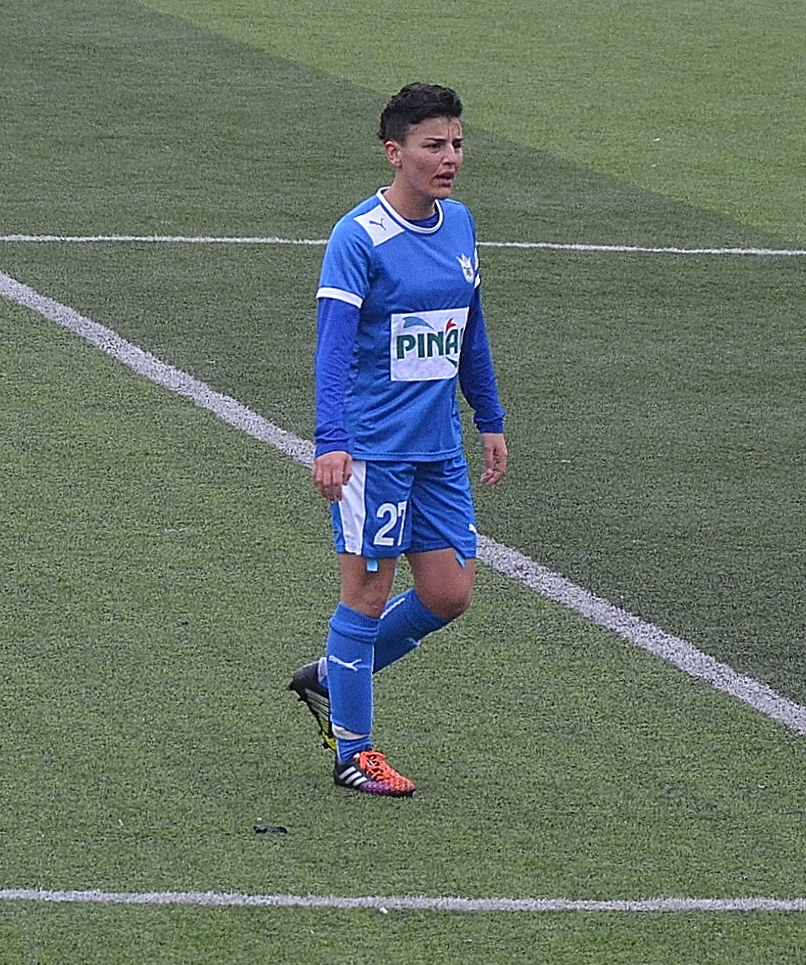
- Cansu Yağ for Konak Belediyespor (March 2014).

Personal information
- Date of birth: 22 June 1990 (age 36)
- Place of birth: Mönchengladbach, Germany
- Position: Midfielder

Senior career*
| Years | Team | Apps | (Gls) |
| 2006–2007 | FSC Mönchengladbach | | |
| 2007–2008 | FFC Braunweiler Pulheim 2000 | | |
| 2008–2010 | FSC Mönchengladbach | | |
| 2010–2011 | Trabzonspor | 20 | (15) |
| 2011–2012 | Lüleburgaz 39 Spor | 17 | (4) |
| 2012–2018 | Konak Belediyespor | 89 | (21) |
| 2022 | Bornova Hitab Spor | 2 | (1) |

International career^{‡}
| 2006 | Turkey U-17 | 1 | (0) |
| 2006–2008 | Turkey U-19 | 21 | (5) |
| 2006–2016 | Turkey | 37 | (4) |
- * Club domestic league appearances and goals as of 29 May 2022 ‡ National team caps and goals as of 6 June 2016

Cansu Yağ (born 22 June 1990) is a Turkish women's football midfielder, who last played in the Turkish Women's First Football League for Bornova Hitab Spor in İzmir. She was admitted to the Turkey women's national football team in 2006 after playing for the national U-15, U-17 and U-19 teams.

== Early life ==
Cansu Yağ was born on 22 June 1990 in Mönchengladbach to Turkish parents living in Germany. Her father, a professional football player in Turkey, who continued his sports career also in Germany, took Cansu to football matches since she was two years old. At the age of six, her father registered her in the club he played. The first seven years, Cansu played football in mixed-gender teams. In the first 13 years of her career, she was with four clubs. In Germany, she played in the Fußball-Regionalliga der Frauen, and was lately in the squad of FSC Mönchengladbach.

== Club career ==
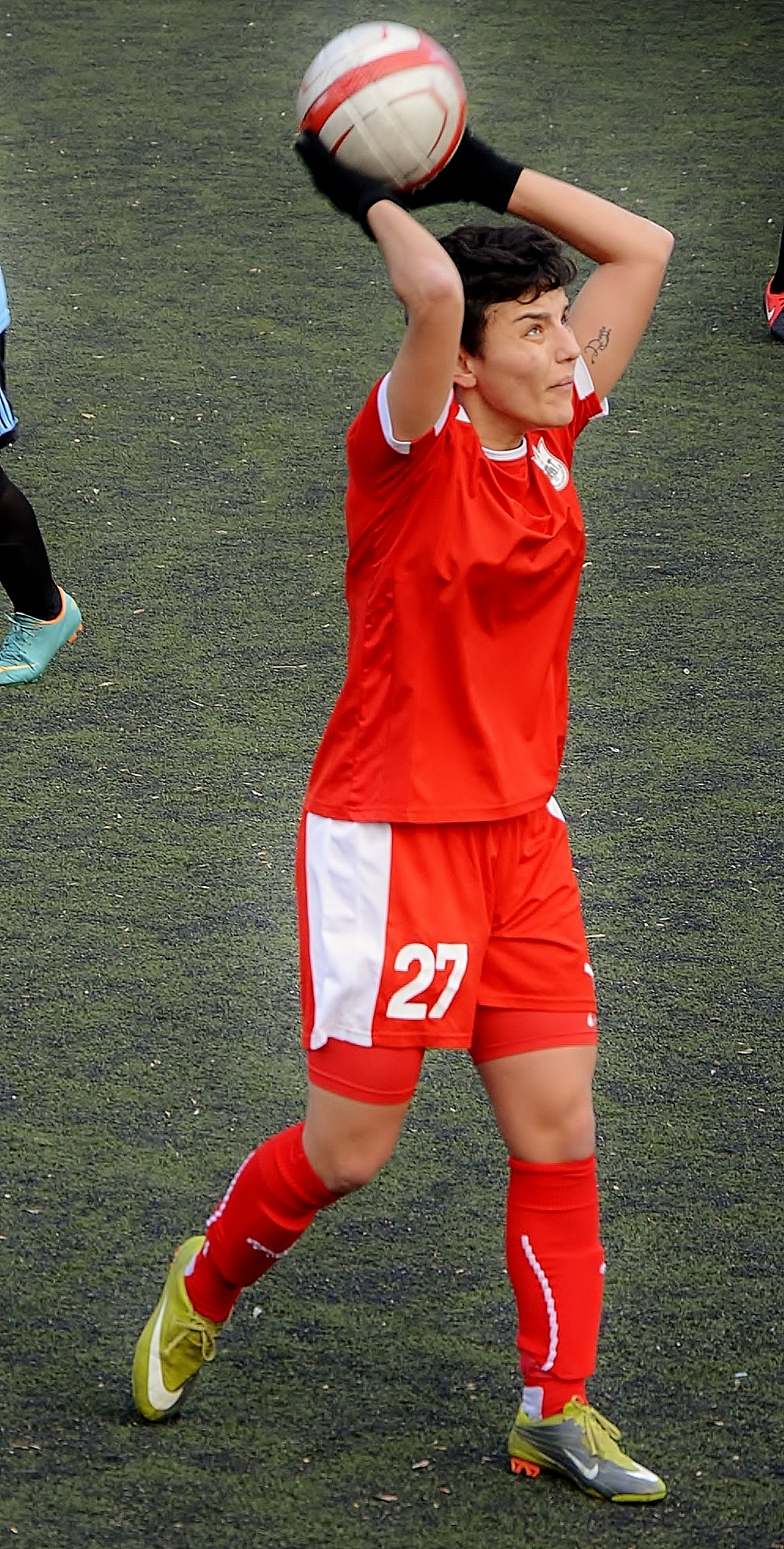
Cansu Yağ playing for Konak Belediyespor in the 2013–14 season against Marmara Üniversitesi Spor.

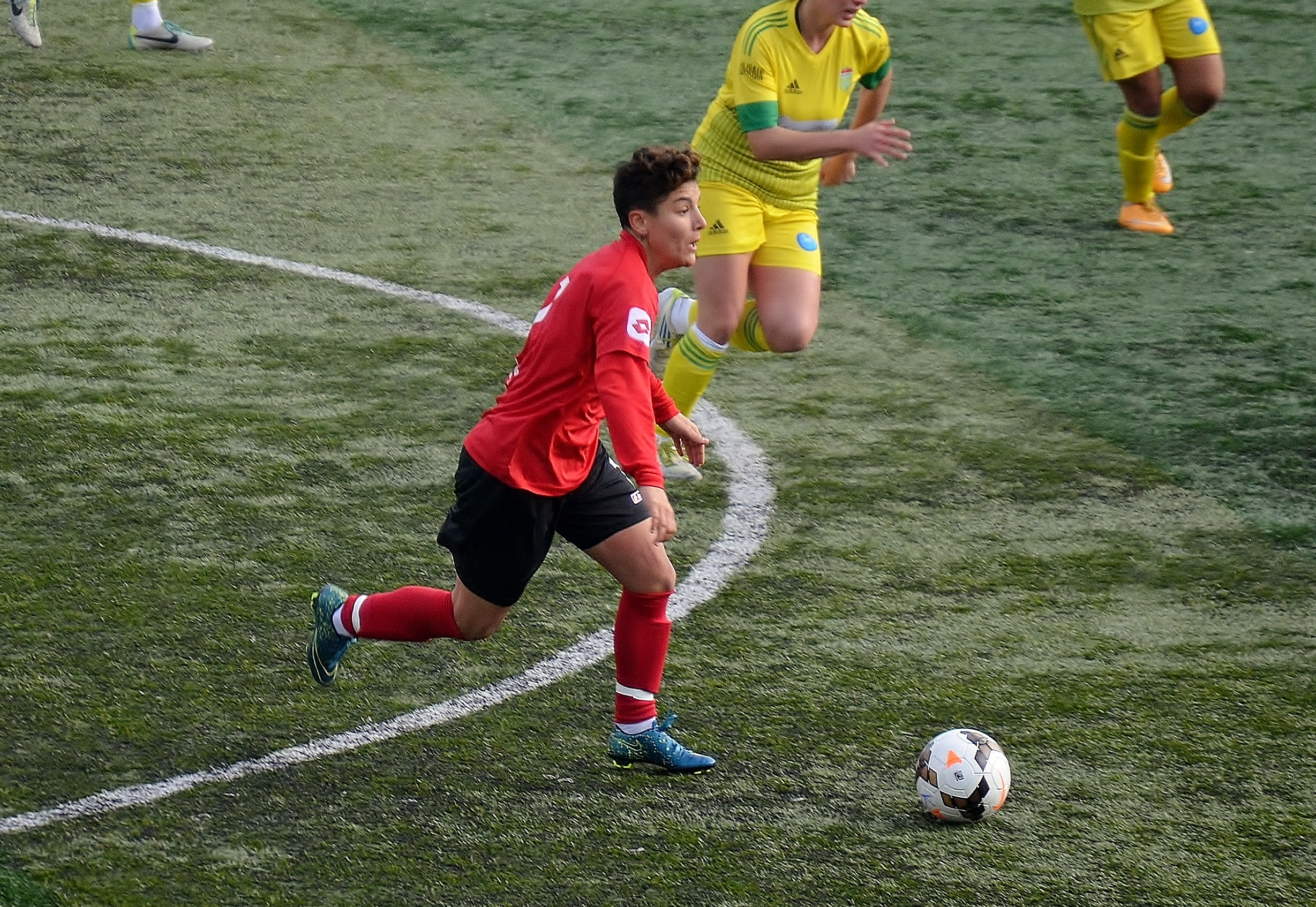
Cansu Yağ driving the ball for Konak Belediyespor in the 2015–16 season against Kireçburnu Spor.

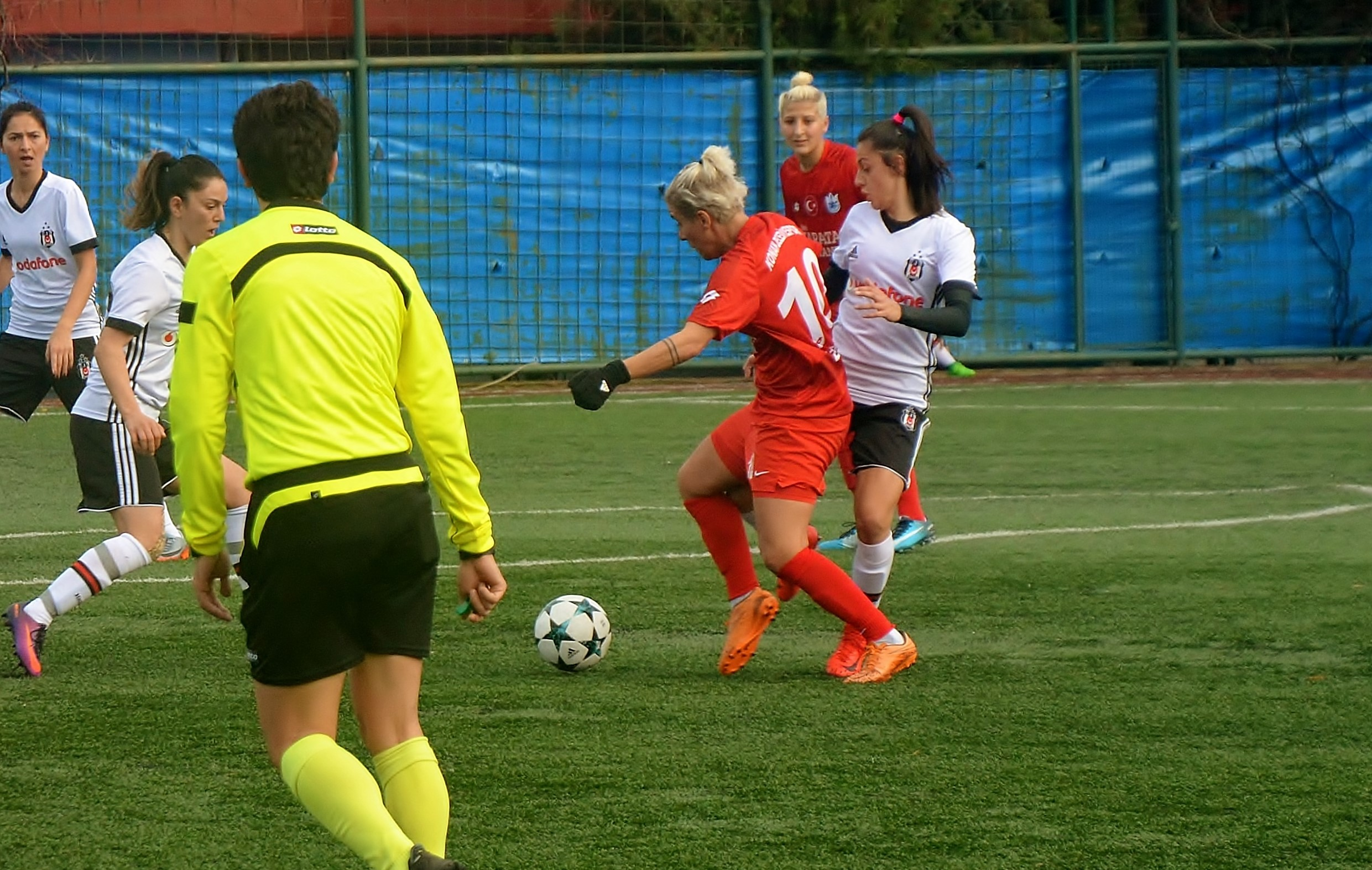
Cansu Yağ (red) playing for Konak Belediyespor in the 2017–18 season's away match.

After graduating from Gymnasium Rheindahlen in Mönchengladbach, she moved to Turkey to attend university. There, she enrolled in the Trakya University in Edirne to study physical education and sports. She played for Trabzonspor until its closure, and then became a member of the women's football club Lüleburgaz 39 Spor in October 2011, which was promoted to the Turkish Women's First Football League. In August 2012, Yağ was transferred by Konak Belediyespor.

At FSC Mönchengladbach, she helped to her team's success by scoring goals many times. Yağ continued scoring at Lüleburgaz 39 Spor, and Konak Belediyespor as well. In the 2012–13 season, at which she scored three goals in total, she experienced the Turkish league championship. Playing in the 2013–14 UEFA Women's Champions League, her team completed the qualifying round as group leader, and passed the Round of 32, failed however to reach the quarterfinals by losing the two matches in the Round of 16 against the Austrian side SV Neulengbach.

At the end of the 2015–16 season, she enjoyed her team's champion title. She played in three matches of the Group 9 of the 2016–17 UEFA Women's Champions League qualifying round.

At the end of the 2017–18 First League season, she ended her career last played at Konak Belediyespor. However, she played in the play-off matches for the 2022–23 Third League season for Bornova Hitab Spor, where she scored one goal in two matches.

International goals
| Date | Venue | Opponent | Competition | Result | Scored |
Konak Belediyespor
| 9 August 2014 | Stadions Arkādija Riga, Latvia | (Latvia) Rīgas FS} | 2014–15 UEFA Champions League | 11–0 | 1 |

== International career ==
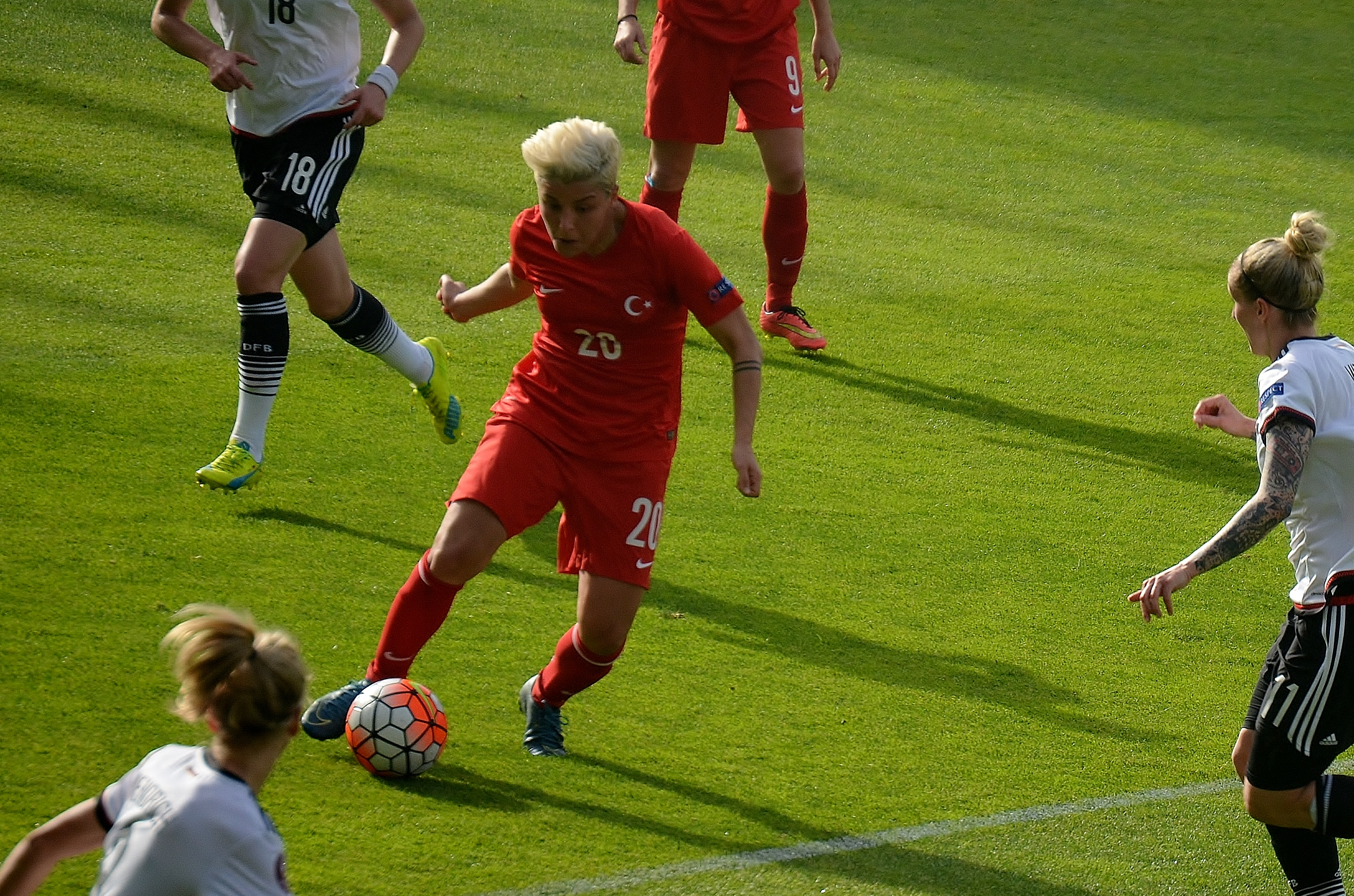
Cansu Yağ playing for Turkey women's national at the UEFA Women's Euro 2017 qualifying Group 5 match against Germany in Istanbul, Turkey.

Already at the age of 14 and still living in Germany, she was selected to the Turkey girls' U-15 national team, and travelled for this reason to Turkey to take part at the training camps and international matches. After playing in the national U-17 and U-19 teams, she was admitted to the Turkish women's national team in 2006. She had preferred to play for the Turkey national rather than for the German. Cansu Yağ played at the 2008 UEFA Women's U-19 Championship First qualifying round matches against the teams from Poland, Austria and Bulgaria, scoring a goal in the last match. In the UEFA Women's Euro 2009 qualifying match against Georgia, she shot one of the nine goals. Yağ scored two goals against Malta and one goal against Austria in the 2011 FIFA Women's World Cup qualification – UEFA Group 5 matches in April 2010.

International goals
| Date | Venue | Opponent | Result | Competition | Scored |
Turkey women's U-19 national football team
| 2 October 2007 | KS Proszowianka Stadium Proszowice, Poland | Bulgaria | 4–0 | 2008 UEFA Women's U-19 Championship First qualifying round | 1 |
Turkey women's national football team
| 23 November 2006 | Adana 5 Ocak Stadium Adana, Turkey | Georgia | 9–0 | UEFA Women's Euro 2009 qualifying | 1 |
| 11 April 2010 | Hüseyin Avni Aker Stadium Trabzon, Turkey | Malta | 5–1 | 2011 FIFA Women's World Cup qualification – UEFA Group 5 | 2 |
| 25 August 2010 | Samsun 19 Mayıs Stadium Samsun, Turkey | Austria | 2–2 | 2011 FIFA Women's World Cup qualification – UEFA Group 5 | 1 |

== Career statistics ==
As of match played 29 May 2022.

| Club | Season | League | | | Continental | | National | | Total | |
| Club | Season | Division | Apps | Goals | Apps | Goals | Apps | Goals | Apps | Goals |
|---|---|---|---|---|---|---|---|---|---|---|
| FSC Mönchengladbach | 2006–07 | | | | – | – | 17 | 5 | 17 | 5 |
| FSC Mönchengladbach | Total | | | | – | – | 17 | 5 | 17 | 5 |
| FFC Braunweiler Pulheim 2000 | 2007–08 | | | | – | – | 5 | 0 | 5 | 0 |
| FFC Braunweiler Pulheim 2000 | Total | | | | – | – | 5 | 0 | 5 | 0 |
| FSC Mönchengladbach | 2008–2010 | | | | – | – | 18 | 2 | 18 | 2 |
| FSC Mönchengladbach | Total | | | | – | – | 18 | 2 | 18 | 2 |
| Trabzonspor | 2010–11 | First League | 20 | 15 | – | – | 5 | 1 | 25 | 16 |
| Trabzonspor | Total | | 20 | 15 | – | – | 5 | 1 | 25 | 16 |
| Lüleburgaz 39 Spor | 2011–12 | First League | 17 | 4 | – | – | 10 | 0 | 27 | 4 |
| Lüleburgaz 39 Spor | Total | | 17 | 4 | – | – | 10 | 0 | 27 | 4 |
| Konak Belediyespor | 2012–13 | First League | 16 | 3 | – | – | 0 | 0 | 16 | 3 |
| Konak Belediyespor | 2013–14 | First League | 15 | 4 | 7 | 0 | 1 | 0 | 23 | 4 |
| Konak Belediyespor | 2014–15 | First League | 9 | 1 | 2 | 1 | 0 | 0 | 11 | 2 |
| Konak Belediyespor | 2015–16 | First League | 16 | 8 | – | – | 3 | 0 | 19 | 8 |
| Konak Belediyespor | 2016–17 | First League | 21 | 3 | 3 | 0 | 0 | 0 | 24 | 3 |
| Konak Belediyespor | 2017–18 | First League | 12 | 2 | 1 | 0 | 0 | 0 | 13 | 2 |
| Konak Belediyespor | Total | | 89 | 21 | 13 | 1 | 4 | 0 | 106 | 22 |
| Bornova Hitab Spor | 2022–23 | Third League | 2 | 1 | – | – | 0 | 0 | 2 | 1 |
| Bornova Hitab Spor | Total | | 2 | 1 | – | – | 0 | 0 | 2 | 1 |
| Career total | | | 128 | 41 | 13 | 1 | 59 | 8 | 200 | 50 |

== Honours ==
Turkish Women's First Football League

Konak Belediyespor
Winners (5): 2012–13, 2013–14, 2014–15, 2015–16, 2016–17
Third places (1): 2017–18
