= Séverine Lecouflé =

French footballer (born 1975)

Severine Lecoufle
Personal information
- Date of birth: 31 March 1975 (age 51)
- Position: Midfielder

International career^{‡}
Years	Team	Apps	(Gls)
1999–2002	France	15	
- ‡ National team caps and goals as of 20 September 2003 (before the 2003 FIFA Women's World Cup)

Severine Lecoufle (born 31 March 1975) is a French footballer who played as a midfielder for the France women's national football team. She was part of the team at the 2003 FIFA Women's World Cup.
