= Irene Fuhrmann =

Austrian footballer

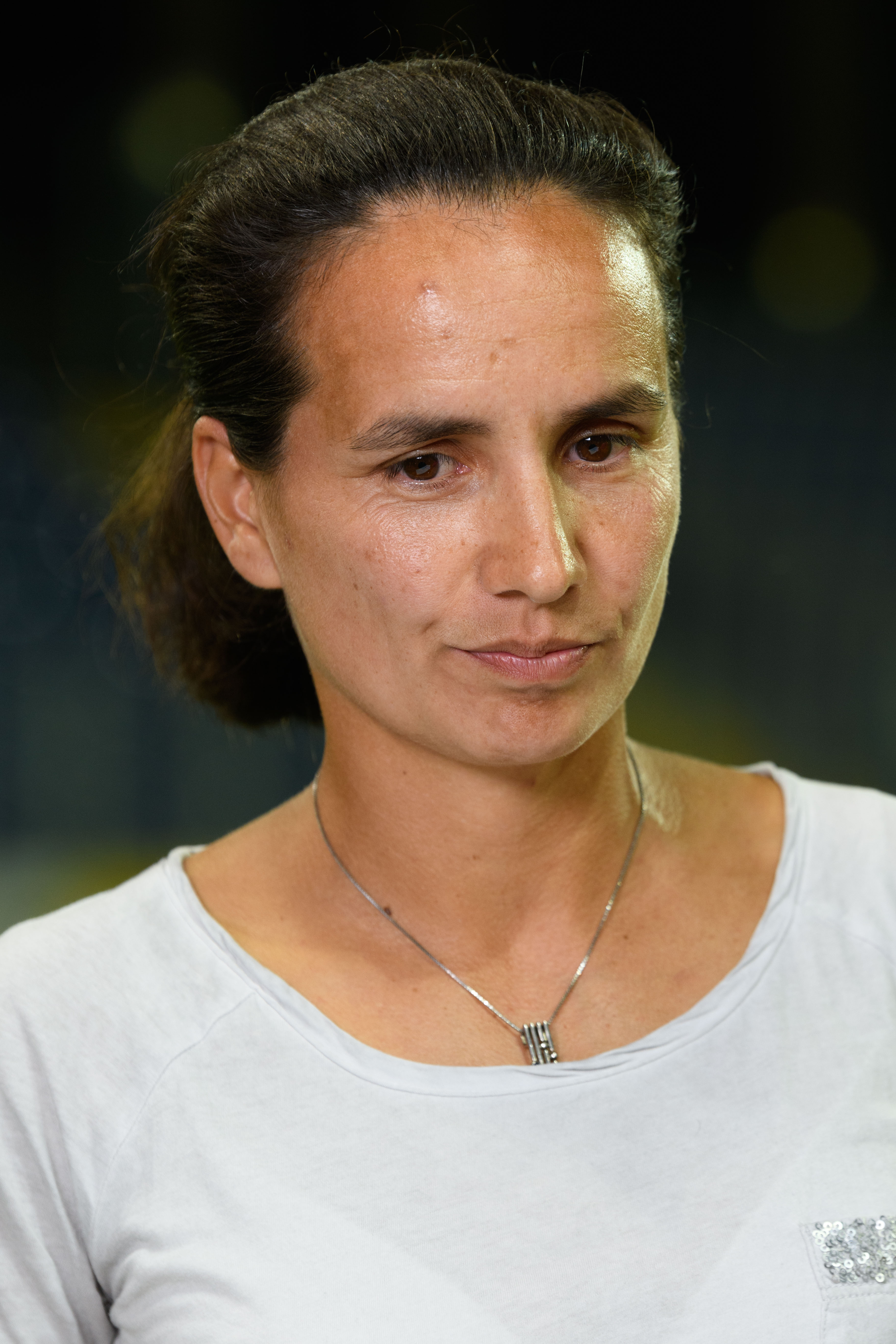

Personal information
- Full name: Irene Fuhrmann
- Date of birth: 23 September 1980 (age 46)
- Place of birth: Vienna, Austria
- Height: 1.65 m (5 ft 5 in)
- Position: Midfielder

Senior career*
Years	Team	Apps	(Gls)
1999–2008	Landhaus		
2002–2003	→ Innsbrucker		

International career
2002–2008	Austria	22	(3)

Managerial career
- 2008–2011: Austria (assistant)
- 2011–2017: Austria U-19
- 2017–2020: Austria (assistant)
- 2020–2024: Austria
- * Club domestic league appearances and goals

Irene Fuhrmann (born 23 September 1980) is an Austrian football manager and former player. She played mostly for USC Landhaus Wien, and was a member of the Austrian national team. She was the coach of the Austrian national team.

== International goals ==
No.	Date	Venue	Opponent	Score	Result	Competition
1.	6 April 2002	Fußach, Austria	Belgium	2–3	2–4	2003 FIFA Women's World Cup qualification
2.	10 May 2003	Waidhofen an der Ybbs, Austria	Armenia	3–0	11–0	UEFA Women's Euro 2005 qualifying
3.	23 July 2007	Anger, Austria	Russia	1–0	1–5	UEFA Women's Euro 2009 qualifying
