= Andrea Budošová =

Slovak footballer

Personal information
- Full name: Andrea Budošová
- Date of birth: 15 May 1980 (age 46)
- Place of birth: Čadca, Czechoslovakia
- Height: 1.71 m (5 ft 7 in)
- Position: Midfielder

Senior career*
Years	Team	Apps	(Gls)
- Čadca
2002–2018	Slavia Prague	258	(99)
2007–2008	→ Ardagger/Neustadtl (loan)	10	(9)
2017–2018	ABC Braník		
2018–2019	FK Union Nové Zámky	23	(12)

International career
1999–2011	Slovakia	56	(20)
- * Club domestic league appearances and goals

Andrea Budošová is a former Slovak football midfielder, who played for Slavia Prague in the Czech First Division. She has also played in the Austrian Frauenliga for USG Ardagger/Neustadtl.

She was a member of the Slovak national team.

== Club career ==
Budošová played in Slovakia for HFK Čadca before moving to Czech side Slavia Prague. When she was 21, she moved to the Czech club Slavia Prague, for whom she played 258 matches and scored 99 goals. Budošová was part of the Slavia team which won the Czech Cup for the first time in their history in 2014. She played all 14 of Slavia's matches in the UEFA Women's Champions League between 2003 and 2016. She scored her team's third goal in the 4–1 win against Brøndby in the competition in October 2015.

The Slovak Football Association included Budošová in their "Eleven of the Year" for 1999, 2000, 2001, 2005, 2006 and 2007.

== International career ==
Budošová represented Slovakia from 1999 to 2011, playing 56 matches and scoring 20 goals.

== Honors ==
- 1 Czech Cup (2014)
