= Anna-Maria Eriksson =

Swedish footballer (born 1976)

Personal information
- Date of birth: 6 December 1976 (age 49)
- Place of birth: Sundsvall, Sweden.
- Height: 1.70 m (5 ft 7 in)
- Position: Defender

International career
Years	Team	Apps	(Gls)
	Sweden	23	(5)

Anna-Maria Eriksson (born 6 December 1976) is a retired Swedish footballer who played for the Norwegian side Kolbotn Fotball.

== Honours ==
=== Club ===
Kolbotn

- Toppserien: 2005
