= Anne Bugge-Paulsen =

Norwegian footballer (born 1979)

Personal information
- Date of birth: 29 June 1979 (age 47)
- Position: Defender

Senior career*
Years	Team	Apps	(Gls)
1998–2006	Arna-Bjørnar	139	(24)

International career
1995	Norway U16	6	(1)
1997	Norway U20	6	(1)
1998–2000	Norway U21	12	(0)
1998–2002	Norway	9	(1)
- * Club domestic league appearances and goals

Anne Bugge-Paulsen (born 29 June 1979) was a Norwegian women's international footballer who played as a defender. She was a member of the Norway women's national football team. She was part of the team at the UEFA Women's Euro 2001. On club level she played for Arna-Bjørnar in Norway.
