= Vibeke Karlsen =

Norwegian football referee (born 1967)

Vibeke Karlsen (born 1 August 1967) is a Norwegian football referee.

She took up refereeing in 1983, has officiated in the Toppserien since 1992 and was a FIFA referee from 1996 to 2004. She officiated in Euro 1997 and the 2000 Olympic Games. She resides in Nesbru, and represents SF Grei.
