= Marlies Hanschitz =

Austrian footballer

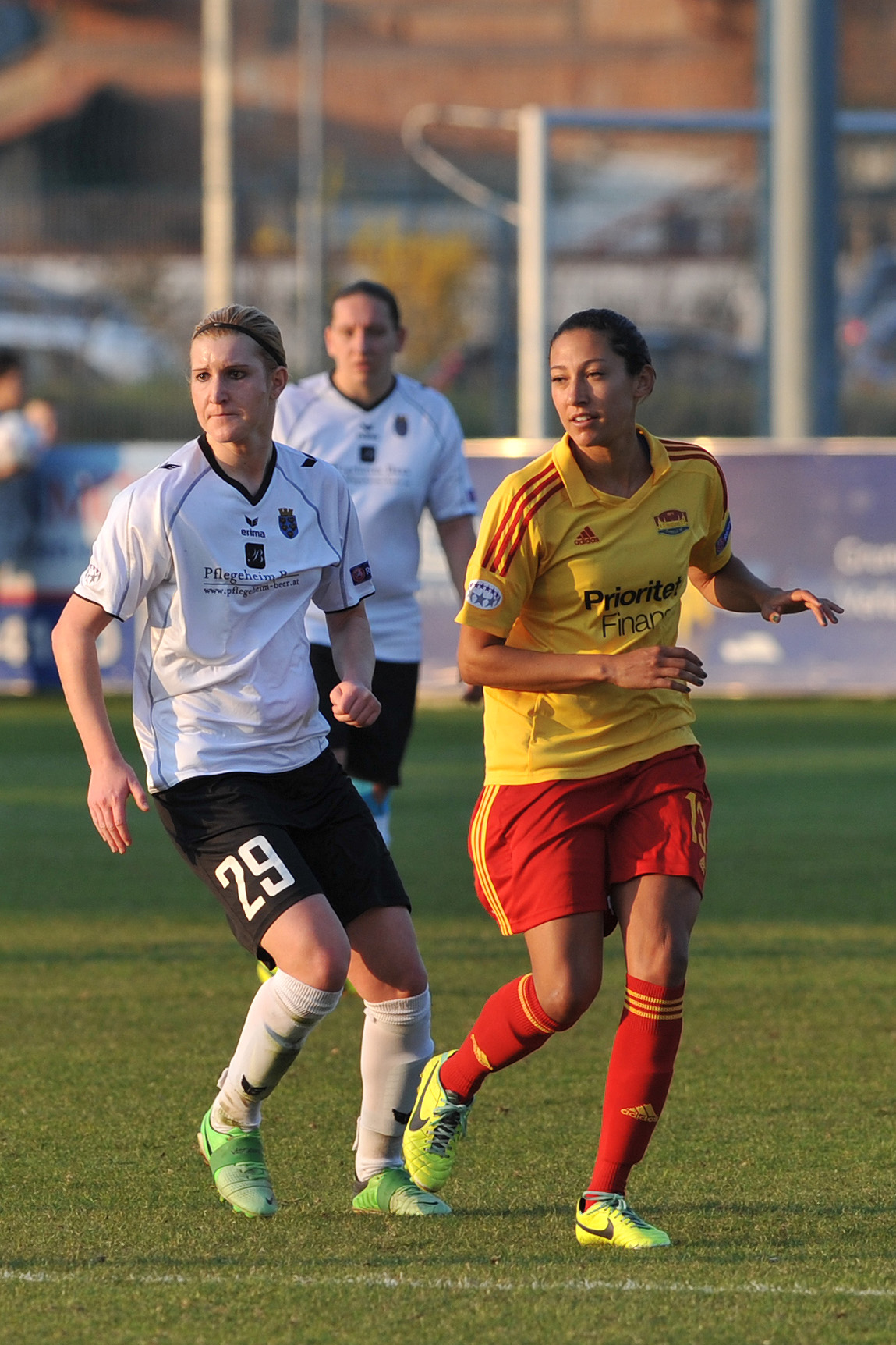
- Hanschitz playing for SV Neulengbach

Personal information
- Date of birth: 12 March 1986 (age 40)
- Place of birth: Wolfsberg, Carinthia, Austria
- Height: 1.74 m (5 ft 9 in)
- Position: Midfielder

Youth career
- 1994–1997: SK Austria Klagenfurt
- 1997–1999: ATSW Wolfsberg
- 1999–2005: ASV St. Margarethen/L

Senior career*
Years	Team	Apps	(Gls)
2005–2006	Innsbrucker AC		
2006–2010	FC Wacker Innsbruck		
2010–2011	SK KELAG Kärnten Frauen		
2011–2012	FC St. Veit		
2012–2013	FC Wacker Innsbruck		
2013–2014	Neulengbach		
2014–2016	SV Brixlegg		

International career^{‡}
2003–2013	Austria	45	(8)
- * Club domestic league appearances and goals ‡ National team caps and goals as of 25 October 2012.

Marlies Hanschitz (born 12 March 1986) is an Austrian retired footballer who played as a midfielder. She has been a member of the Austria women's national team.

== Club career ==
In 1994, the then 8-year-old Hanschitz started playing football at SK Austria Klagenfurt. After various club changes between SK Austria Klagenfurt and ATSV Wolfsberg, she switched to the girls' team at ASV St. Margarethen / L in 1999. Here the striker also scored the first goal in the Austrian Bundesliga. In 2005 she signed the Innsbruck AC. In 2006 the IAC women's team was taken over by FC Wacker Innsbruck. After two intermediate positions at SK KELAG Kärnten Frauen in 2010 and at FC St. Veit in 2011. In 2012 she returned to FC Wacker Innsbruck for one season. This was followed by an engagement with SV Neulengbach. Most recently she played for SV Brixlegg in the Tyrolean Women's League.

== International career ==
Between 2003 and 2013, Hanschitz played 45 games for the senior Austria women's national football team. In these games, she scored 8 goals and was captain a few times. She capped during the 2011 FIFA Women's World Cup qualification and the UEFA Women's Euro 2013 qualifying.

== Honours ==
=== Club ===
SV Neulengbach

- ÖFB-Frauenliga: 2013–14
