= Birgitt Hufnagl =

Austrian footballer (born 1982)

Personal information
- Full name: Birgit Schalkhammer-Hufnagl
- Date of birth: August 13, 1982 (age 44)
- Position: Midfielder

International career
Years	Team	Apps	(Gls)
1997–2007	Austria	30	(9)

Birgitt Hufnagl (born 13 August 1982) is a former Austrian footballer. During her career she has played FCR 2001 Duisburg and SSD Women Hellas Verona.

== International career ==
Hufnagl represented Austria 30 international times over a period of nine years, scoring five goals.
