= Gertrud Stallinger =

Austrian footballer

Personal information
- Date of birth: November 23, 1967 (age 58)
- Height: 1.72 m (5 ft 8 in)
- Position: Midfielder

International career
Years	Team	Apps	(Gls)
1990-2005	Austria	56	(30)

Gertrud Stallinger (born 23 November 1967) ) is a former Austrian international football player who played Bayern Munich, and also played on the Austrian national team between 1990 and 2005.

== International career ==
Gertrud Stallinger was the second highest goal scorer for the Austrian women's national team with 30 goals in 56 appearances.

== Honours ==
Union Kleinmünchen

- 8 Austrian Leagues (1990 — 1994, 1996, 1998, 1999)
- 6 Austrian Cups (1991, 1993, 1995, 1996, 1998, 1999)
