= Sonja Spieler =

Austrian football player

Personal information
- Date of birth: 27 May 1978 (age 48)
- Place of birth: Bregenz, Austria
- Height: 1.75 m (5 ft 9 in)
- Position: Midfielder

Sonja Spieler (born 27 May 1978) is a retired Austrian footballer who played as a midfielder for FC Bayern Munich and the Austria women's national football team.

== International career ==
Spieler made her debut for Austria at 15 years old.
