= Nina Aigner =

Austrian footballer

Personal information
- Date of birth: 20 June 1980 (age 46)
- Place of birth: Antiesenhofen, Austria
- Position: Midfielder

Senior career*
| Years | Team | Apps | (Gls) |
| 1998 | SV Peterskirchen | | |
| 1998–1999 | Union Kleinmünchen | | (12) |
| 1999–2001 | USC Landhaus Wien | | (52) |
| 2001–2011 | Bayern Munich | 176 | (107) |

International career
| 1998–2006 | Austria | 29 | (7) |
- * Club domestic league appearances and goals

Nina Aigner (born 20 June 1980) is a former Austrian international football player. She played her entire senior career for Bayern Munich, and also played on the Austrian national team between 1998 and 2006.

Aigner played as a midfield, but was renowned for her goal scoring qualities. She was the second top scorer of the 2002-03 Bundesliga, next to Inka Grings.

She currently serves as the Austrian national team's assistant coach.
