= Austria women's national football team =

Women's national association football team representing Austria

Austria
- Association: Österreichischer Fußball-Bund (ÖFB)
- Confederation: UEFA (Europe)
- Head coach: Lars Sondergaard
- Captain: Sarah Puntigam
- Most caps: Sarah Puntigam (166)
- Top scorer: Nina Burger (53)
- FIFA code: AUT
| First colours | Second colours |

FIFA ranking
- Current: 25 ▼2 (20 October 2026)
- Highest: 16 (August 2023)
- Lowest: 48 (July – October 2003)

First international
- Mexico 9–0 Austria (Bari, Italy; 6 July 1970)

Biggest win
- Austria 11–0 Armenia (Waidhofen, Austria; 10 May 2003); Austria 11–0 Armenia (Waidhofen, Austria; 13 May 2003)

Biggest defeat
- Mexico 9–0 Austria (Bari, Italy; 6 July 1970); Switzerland 9–0 Austria (8 November 1970)

European Championship
- Appearances: 2 (first in 2017)
- Best result: Semifinals (2017)

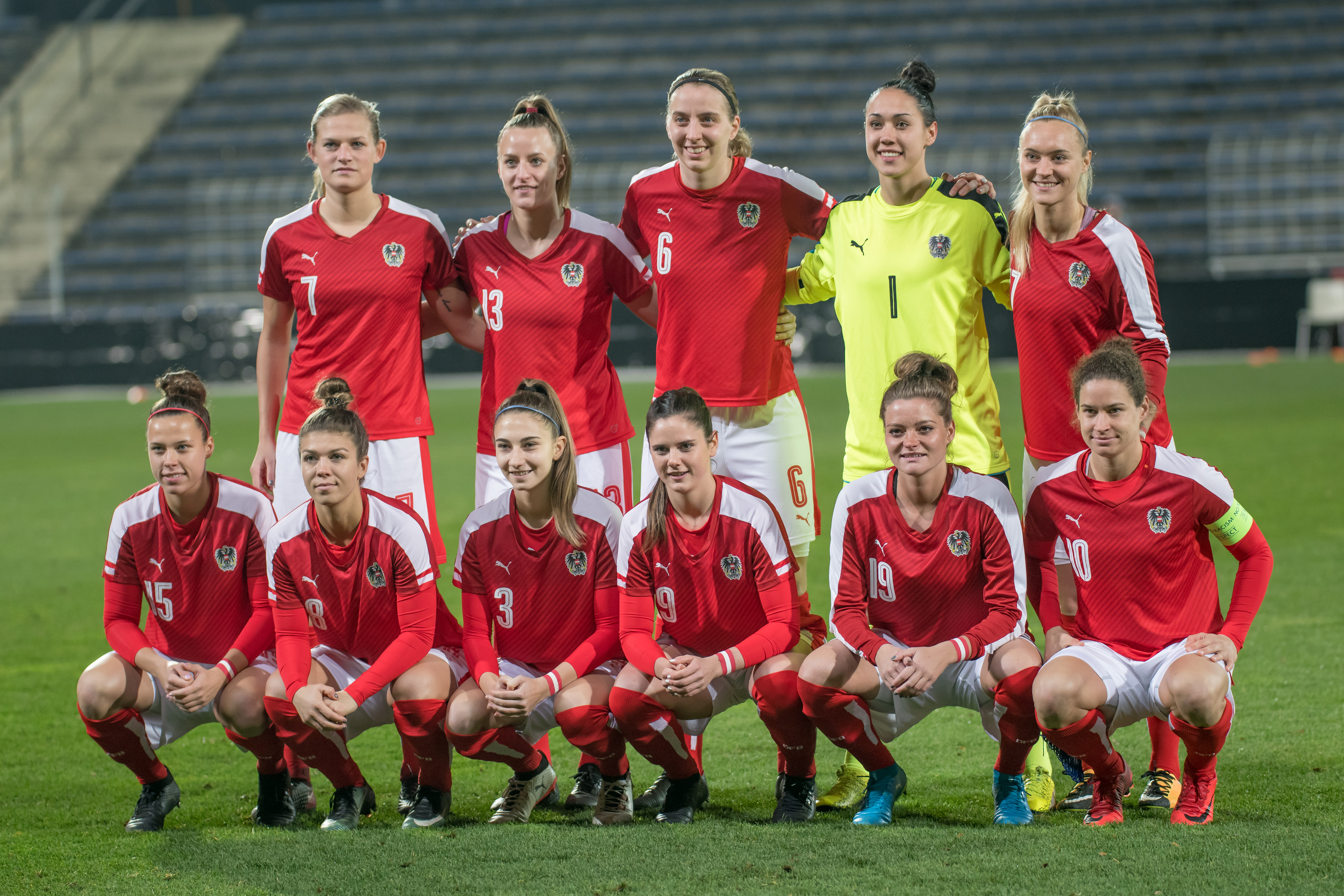
Austria Women's National team in November 2017

The Austria women's national football team represents Austria in international women's football competition. The team is controlled by the Austrian Football Association.

The national team is made up mainly of players from the Austrian and German Women's Bundesligas. In 2016, the team qualified for its first-ever major tournament: UEFA Women's Euro 2017.

== History ==
=== Beginnings ===
The Austrian team started playing on July 6, 1970, against Mexico in Bari, Italy, competing in the Women's World Cup 1970, unofficial competition held in that country from July 6 to July 15, 1970. The result was a 9–0 crushing defeat, which remains one of its worst results in its history, with this result Austria was quickly out of the competition, playing after months against Switzerland, repeating itself again the defeat against Mexico, 9–0.

It played two recognized friendlies against Switzerland before the first Women's World Cup in 1978 and 1990, losing both by 6–2 and 5–1. The Austrian team did not participate in the inaugural Women's World Cup 1991 in China and also the 1995 edition in Sweden, but during that time played international friendlies. Austria played Women's Euro 1997 Qualifiers, held in Norway and Sweden. It was placed in Class B, in Group 7 with Switzerland, Yugoslavia and Greece, winning three games in a single chance against their three opponents, tying a game against Greece and losing two against Switzerland and Yugoslavia, finishing third in the group and eliminated from both tournaments. Thus, Austria did not enter the 1999 World Cup Qualifiers, held in the United States. Austria ended 1999 with three games of qualifying for the Euro 2001.

=== 2000s and 2010s ===
The team started 2000 with a 3–0 defeat against Belgium, four days later they lost again, with Poland by 3–2 but won 1–0 against Wales, finishing third and returning to be eliminated from a tournament. The Austrians played their first game of the 2003 World Cup Qualification against Scotland losing 2–1 with goal from Stallinger in the 21st minute, then played against Wales and won 2–0 with another goal from Stallinger and one from Schalkhammer-Hufnagl. Their third match against Belgium was a 3–1 defeat, with a goal by Spieler in the 59th minute. Austria lost their second match against Belgium 4–2, with goals from Szankovich and Fuhrmann, after a month, the team played against Scotland, with a crushing defeat for 5–0 and finally a 1–1 draw with Wales with Austria's only goal coming from Spieler in the 45th minute, ending with 4 points from one win, one tie and four losses, and thus eliminated. The latest and best performing competition of Austria was the qualification for the Women's World Cup in 2011, where they started out poorly but reached third place with 10 points, the product of three wins, one draw and four defeats. They played the 2015 Women's World Cup Qualification, but failed to qualify.

Austria qualified for the first time in its history for a European Championship finals at Euro 2017 in the Netherlands. Reversed in group C with France, Switzerland and Iceland, it thwarted the predictions by finishing in 1st place in the group with two wins (1–0 against Switzerland and 3–0 against Iceland) and a draw (1–1 against France). In the quarter-finals, the Austrians faced the Spanish, 2nd in Group D, and won the penalty shoot-out (0–0, 5–3 on penalties). Their journey ended in the semi-final against Denmark, where unlike the quarter-final win against Spain, this time they failed in the penalty shootout without making a single attempt (0–0, 0–3 pt). The turning point of the game was the missed penalty by Sarah Puntigam in the 13th minute of play which could have given Austria a decisive advantage. Nevertheless, Dominik Thalhammer's team leaves the competition with a more than honorable record, without having lost a single game and with only one goal conceded (against France in the group matches), for their first participation in a major competition.

They qualified for their 2nd consecutive Euro at the 2022 edition where they again passed the first round. Austria finished second in Group A, behind England, the host country of the competition and eventual champions, against whom they lost by a narrow margin (0–1), but ahead of Norway and Northern Ireland, whom they beat 1–0 and 2–0 respectively. In the quarter-finals, they faced Germany, leader of group B, for a German-speaking derby against the most successful team of the competition. In spite of a good performance in which they obtained several goal opportunities (including 3 goalposts touched), they were beaten 0–2 by the eight-time winners who were more realistic and took advantage of two Austrian defensive errors to make the difference.

== Results and fixtures ==
The following is a list of match results in the last 12 months, as well as any future matches that have been scheduled.

Legend

Win Draw Loss Fixture

=== 2025 ===
| 27 November Friendly | Finland | 1–1 | Austria | Arcos de la Frontera, Spain |
| 19:00 | | | | Stadium: Estadio Antonio Gallardo |

| 1 December Friendly | Ukraine | 3–2 | Austria | Sanlucar de Barrameda, Spain |
| 12:00 UTC+1 | Kozlova 14'; Kravchuk 18'; Ovdiychuk 47' | Report | Hillebrand 1'; Kotyk 28' (o.g.) | Stadium: Estadio El Palmar; Referee: Caroline Lanssens (Belgium) |

=== 2026 ===
| 3 March 2027 FIFA Women's World Cup qualification | Austria | 0–1 | Norway | Maria Enzersdorf |
| 18:00 UTC+1 | | Report (FIFA); Report (UEFA) | Naalsund 81' | Stadium: Datenpol Arena; Attendance: 1,480; Referee: Kirsty Dowle (England) |

| 7 March 2027 FIFA Women's World Cup qualification | Slovenia | 1–0 | Austria | Koper |
| 19:00 UTC+1 | Kramžar 21' | Report (FIFA); Report (UEFA) | | Stadium: Bonifika Stadium; Attendance: 543; Referee: Hristiyana Guteva (Bulgaria) |

| 14 April 2027 FIFA Women's World Cup qualification | Germany | 5–1 | Austria | Nuremberg |
| 18:15 UTC+2 | Anyomi 17'; Endemann 52'; Puntigam 68' (o.g.); Brand 76'; Schüller 83' | Report | D'Angelo 77' | Stadium: Max-Morlock-Stadion; Attendance: 24,237; Referee: Volha Blotskaya (Belarus) |

| 18 April 2027 FIFA Women's World Cup qualification | Austria | 0–0 | Germany | Ried im Innkreis |
| 18:00 UTC+2 | | Report | | Stadium: BWT X Upper Austrian Arena; Attendance: 4,300; Referee: Iuliana Demetrescu (Romania) |

| 5 June 2027 FIFA Women's World Cup qualification | Austria | 1–0 | Slovenia | Vienna |
| 18:00 UTC+2 | Naschenweng 55' | Report | | Stadium: Wiener Sport-Club; Attendance: 4,300; Referee: Olatz Rivera Olmedo (Spain) |

| 9 June 2027 FIFA Women's World Cup qualification | Norway | 2–1 | Austria | Oslo, Norway |
| 18:00 UTC+2 | Bjelde 46'; Graham Hansen 48' | Report | Dunst 51' | Stadium: Ullevaal Stadion; Attendance: 7,256; Referee: Ivana Projkovska (North Macedonia) |

| 9 October 2027 FIFA Women's World Cup play-offs | Kosovo | 1–2 | Austria | Vienna, Austria |
| 17:00 | Memeti 14' | Report (FIFA); Report (UEFA) | Schöffel 37'; Billa 81' | Stadium: Sportclub-Platz Dornbach; Referee: Kristina Georgieva (Bulgaria) |

| 13 October 2027 FIFA Women's World Cup play-offs | Austria | 4–0 | Kosovo | Vienna, Austria |
| 18:00 | Höbinger 7'; Puntigam 65'; Kirchberger 86'; Campbell 90' | Report (FIFA); Report (UEFA) | | Stadium: Sportclub-Platz Dornbach; Referee: Nanna Løf Andersen (Denmark) |

| November 2027 FIFA Women's World Cup qualification play-offs | Switzerland | v | Austria |

| December 2027 FIFA Women's World Cup qualification play-offs | Austria | v | Switzerland |

== Coaching staff ==
=== Current coaching staff ===
Updated as of October 22, 2026.

| Position | Name |
|---|---|
| Head Coach and Sports Director | Stefan Kenesei |
| Assistant coach | Georg Konstandeas |
| Goalkeeper coach | Max Paukner |
| Match analyst | Mauro Vasile |

=== Manager history ===
Updated as of October 22, 2026.

- (Austria) Ernst Weber (1999–2011)
- (Austria) Dominik Thalhammer (2011–2020)
- (Austria) Irene Fuhrmann (2020–2024)
- (Austria) Alexander Schriebl (2025–2026)
- (Austria) Niklas Pichler (2026–)

== Players ==
=== Current squad ===
The following players were called up for the 2027 FIFA Women's World Cup qualification play-off matches against Kosovo on 9 and 13 October 2026, respectively.

Caps and goals correct as of 13 October 2026, after the second match against Kosovo.

| No. | Pos. | Player | Date of birth (age) | Caps | Goals | Club |
|---|---|---|---|---|---|---|
| 1 | GK | Mariella El Sherif | 2 September 2004 (age 22) | 11 | 0 | (German Football Association) Werder Bremen |
| 21 | GK | Larissa Rusek | 1 January 2005 (age 21) | 0 | 0 | (Italian Football Federation) Juventus |
| 23 | GK | Jasmin Pal | 24 August 1996 (age 30) | 7 | 0 | (Austrian Football Association) Austria Wien |
| 2 | DF | Louise Schöffel | 25 December 2001 (age 24) | 5 | 1 | (Austrian Football Association) Austria Wien |
| 3 | DF | Sarah Gutmann | 17 July 2006 (age 20) | 5 | 0 | (German Football Association) Werder Bremen |
| 4 | DF | Valentina Pötzl | 13 December 2008 (age 17) | 2 | 0 | (Austrian Football Association) Austria Wien |
| 5 | DF | Claudia Wenger | 6 May 2001 (age 25) | 17 | 0 | (German Football Association) Bayer Leverkusen |
| 6 | DF | Katharina Schiechtl | 27 February 1993 (age 33) | 77 | 10 | (Austrian Football Association) Austria Wien |
| 12 | DF | Laura Wienroither | 13 January 1999 (age 27) | 46 | 2 | (The Football Association) Manchester City |
| 13 | DF | Virginia Kirchberger-Prohaska | 25 May 1993 (age 33) | 126 | 6 | (Austrian Football Association) Austria Wien |
| 19 | DF | Verena Hanshaw | 20 January 1994 (age 32) | 132 | 10 | (Austrian Football Association) Austria Wien |
| 22 | DF | Jennifer Klein | 11 January 1999 (age 27) | 24 | 2 | (Austrian Football Association) St. Pölten |
| | DF | Julia Magerl | 2 May 2003 (age 23) | 4 | 1 | (German Football Association) Werder Bremen |
| 8 | MF | Barbara Dunst | 25 September 1997 (age 29) | 97 | 14 | (German Football Association) Bayern Munich |
| 9 | MF | Sarah Zadrazil | 19 February 1993 (age 33) | 130 | 15 | (German Football Association) Bayern Munich |
| 10 | MF | Marie Höbinger | 1 July 2001 (age 25) | 53 | 8 | (The Football Association) Liverpool |
| 11 | MF | Nicole Ojukwu | 28 November 2005 (age 20) | 4 | 0 | (German Football Association) SC Freiburg |
| 16 | MF | Annabel Schasching | 26 July 2002 (age 24) | 39 | 3 | (German Football Association) RB Leipzig |
| 17 | MF | Sarah Puntigam | 13 October 1992 (age 34) | 168 | 26 | (United States Soccer Federation) Houston Dash |
| 20 | MF | Naika Reissner | 3 November 2004 (age 22) | 2 | 0 | (German Football Association) Union Berlin |
| 7 | FW | Eileen Campbell | 17 September 2000 (age 26) | 34 | 10 | (German Football Association) Union Berlin |
| 14 | FW | Lilli Purtscheller | 12 August 2003 (age 23) | 25 | 3 | (German Football Association) Werder Bremen |
| 15 | FW | Nicole Billa | 5 March 1996 (age 30) | 111 | 48 | (German Football Association) VfB Stuttgart |
| 18 | FW | Julia Hickelsberger | 1 August 1999 (age 27) | 53 | 9 | (Royal Dutch Football Association) PSV |

=== Recent call-ups ===
The following players have also been called up to the squad within the past 12 months.

| Pos. | Player | Date of birth (age) | Caps | Goals | Club | Latest call-up |
|---|---|---|---|---|---|---|
| GK | Manuela Zinsberger | 19 October 1995 (age 31) | 110 | 0 | (Germany) Borussia Dortmund | v. Czech Republic, 24 October 2025 ^{INJ} |
| DF | Chiara D'Angelo | 31 July 2004 (age 22) | 12 | 1 | (Germany) Werder Bremen | v. Norway, 9 June 2026 |
| DF | Celina Degen | 16 May 2001 (age 25) | 24 | 3 | (Germany) 1. FC Köln | v. Norway, 9 June 2026 |
| DF | Marina Georgieva | 13 April 1997 (age 29) | 48 | 0 | (Germany) Mainz 05 | v. Ukraine, 1 December 2025 |
| MF | Katharina Naschenweng | 16 December 1997 (age 28) | 57 | 7 | (Germany) Bayern Munich | v. Kosovo, 9 October 2026 ^{INJ} |
| MF | Sophie Hillebrand | 24 January 2002 (age 24) | 9 | 1 | (Germany) Hamburger SV | v. Norway, 9 June 2026 |
| MF | Maria Plattner | 6 May 2001 (age 25) | 19 | 5 | (Austria) RB Salzburg | v. Germany, 18 April 2026 |
| MF | Tatjana Weiss | 13 January 2004 (age 22) | 0 | 0 | Austria Wien | v. Germany, 18 April 2026 |
| MF | Laura Feiersinger ^{RET} | 5 April 1993 (age 33) | 126 | 19 | (Germany) 1. FC Köln | v. Czech Republic, 28 October 2025 |
| FW | Melanie Brunnthaler | 28 September 2000 (age 26) | 11 | 0 | (Germany) Hamburger SV | v. Norway, 9 June 2026 |
| FW | Carina Brunold | 17 September 2002 (age 24) | 11 | 0 | (Austria) St. Pölten | v. Norway, 9 June 2026 |
| FW | Viktoria Pinther ^{PRE} | 16 October 1998 (age 28) | 53 | 2 | (France) Strasbourg | v. Slovenia, 5 June 2026 |
| FW | Valentina Mädl ^{PRE} | 18 December 2005 (age 20) | 0 | 0 | (Germany) Bayer Leverkusen | v. Slovenia, 5 June 2026 |
| FW | Lisa Kolb | 14 May 2001 (age 25) | 26 | 2 | (Germany) SC Freiburg | v. Germany, 18 April 2026 |
Notes: ^{INJ} = Withdrew due to injury; ^{PRE} = Preliminary squad; ^{RET} = Retired from the national team; ^{TOP} = Train-on player

== Records ==
As of 13 October 2026

Players in bold are still active with the national team.

=== Most appearances ===
| Rank | Player | Career | Caps | Goals |
|---|---|---|---|---|
| 1 | **Sarah Puntigam** | 2009–present | 168 | 26 |
| 2 | **Verena Hanshaw** | 2011–present | 132 | 10 |
| 3 | **Sarah Zadrazil** | 2010–present | 130 | 15 |
| 4 | Carina Wenninger | 2007–2023 | 127 | 7 |
| 5 | Laura Feiersinger | 2010–2025 | 126 | 19 |
| 5 | **Virginia Kirchberger-Prohaska** | 2010–present | 126 | 6 |
| 7 | **Nicole Billa** | 2013–present | 111 | 48 |
| 8 | **Manuela Zinsberger** | 2013–present | 110 | 0 |
| 9 | Nina Burger | 2005–2019 | 109 | 53 |
| 10 | **Barbara Dunst** | 2015–present | 97 | 14 |

=== Top goalscorers ===
| Rank | Player | Career | Goals | Caps | Avg. |
|---|---|---|---|---|---|
| 1 | Nina Burger | 2005–2019 | 53 | 109 | 0.49 |
| 2 | **Nicole Billa** | 2013–present | 48 | 111 | 0.43 |
| 3 | Gertrud Stallinger | 1990–2005 | 30 | 56 | 0.54 |
| 4 | **Sarah Puntigam** | 2009–present | 26 | 168 | 0.15 |
| 5 | Lisa Makas | 2010–2022 | 19 | 74 | 0.26 |
| 5 | Laura Feiersinger | 2010–2025 | 19 | 126 | 0.15 |
| 7 | **Sarah Zadrazil** | 2010–present | 15 | 130 | 0.12 |
| 8 | **Barbara Dunst** | 2015–present | 14 | 97 | 0.14 |
| 9 | Elke Scheubmayr | 1991–2001 | 13 | 37 | 0.35 |
| 10 | Nina Aigner | 1998–2010 | 11 | 40 | 0.28 |

== Competitive record ==
=== FIFA Women's World Cup ===
| FIFA Women's World Cup record | | | | | | | | | Qualification record | | | | | |
| Year | Result | Position | Pld | W | D* | L | GF | GA | Pld | W | D | L | GF | GA |
|---|---|---|---|---|---|---|---|---|---|---|---|---|---|---|
| (China) 1991 | Did not enter | | | | | | | | Did not enter | | | | | |
| (Sweden) 1995 | Did not enter | | | | | | | | Did not enter | | | | | |
| (United States) 1999 | Did not enter | | | | | | | | Did not enter | | | | | |
| (United States) 2003 | Did not qualify | | | | | | | | 6 | 1 | 1 | 4 | 7 | 15 |
| (China) 2007 | Did not qualify | | | | | | | | 8 | 1 | 1 | 6 | 7 | 19 |
| (Germany) 2011 | Did not qualify | | | | | | | | 8 | 3 | 1 | 4 | 14 | 12 |
| (Canada) 2015 | Did not qualify | | | | | | | | 10 | 7 | 0 | 3 | 31 | 14 |
| (France) 2019 | Did not qualify | | | | | | | | 8 | 5 | 1 | 2 | 19 | 7 |
| (Australia) (New Zealand) 2023 | Did not qualify | | | | | | | | 11 | 7 | 1 | 3 | 50 | 8 |
| (Brazil) 2027 | To be determined | | | | | | | | To be determined | | | | | |
| (Costa Rica) (Jamaica) (Mexico) (United States) 2031 | To be determined | | | | | | | | To be determined | | | | | |
| (United Kingdom) 2035 | To be determined | | | | | | | | To be determined | | | | | |
| Total | — | 0/10 | — | — | — | — | — | — | 51 | 24 | 5 | 22 | 128 | 75 |

*Draws include knockout matches decided on penalty kicks.

=== UEFA Women's Championship ===
| UEFA Women's Championship record | | | | | | | | | | Qualification record | | | | | | | |
| Year | Result | Position | Pld | W | D* | L | GF | GA | Squad | Pld | W | D | L | GF | GA | P/R | Rnk |
|---|---|---|---|---|---|---|---|---|---|---|---|---|---|---|---|---|---|
| 1984 | Did not enter | | | | | | | | | Did not enter | | | | | | | |
| (Norway) 1987 | Did not enter | | | | | | | | | Did not enter | | | | | | | |
| (West Germany) 1989 | Did not enter | | | | | | | | | Did not enter | | | | | | | |
| (Denmark) 1991 | Did not enter | | | | | | | | | Did not enter | | | | | | | |
| (Italy) 1993 | Did not enter | | | | | | | | | Did not enter | | | | | | | |
| (Germany) 1995 | Did not enter | | | | | | | | | Did not enter | | | | | | | |
| (Norway) (Sweden) 1997 | Did not qualify | | | | | | | | | 6 | 3 | 1 | 2 | 8 | 12 | – | |
| (Germany) 2001 | Did not qualify | | | | | | | | | 6 | 1 | 1 | 4 | 6 | 14 | – | |
| (England) 2005 | Did not qualify | | | | | | | | | 6 | 5 | 0 | 1 | 31 | 4 | – | |
| (Finland) 2009 | Did not qualify | | | | | | | | | 8 | 3 | 0 | 5 | 13 | 18 | – | |
| (Sweden) 2013 | Did not qualify | | | | | | | | | 10 | 6 | 2 | 2 | 17 | 12 | – | |
| (Netherlands) 2017 | Semi-finals | 3rd | 5 | 2 | 3 | 0 | 5 | 1 | Squad | 8 | 5 | 2 | 1 | 18 | 4 | – | |
| (England) 2022 | Quarter-finals | 7th | 4 | 2 | 0 | 2 | 3 | 3 | Squad | 8 | 6 | 1 | 1 | 22 | 3 | – | |
| (Switzerland) 2025 | Did not qualify | | | | | | | | | 10 | 4 | 1 | 5 | 15 | 15 | (Note: From Euro 2025 onwards a new qualifying format was introduced, linked to the Women's Nations League where teams are divided into leagues with promotion/relegation between the leagues at the end of each cycle.) | 11th |
| (Germany) 2029 | To be determined | | | | | | | | | To be determined | | | | | | | |
| Total | Semi-finals | 2/14 | 9 | 4 | 3 | 2 | 8 | 4 | — | 62 | 33 | 8 | 21 | 130 | 82 | 11th | |

*Draws include knockout matches decided on penalty kicks.

=== UEFA Women's Nations League ===
UEFA Women's Nations League record
| League phase | | | | | | | | | | | | Finals | | | | | | | |
| Season | LG | Grp | Pos | Pld | W | D | L | GF | GA | P/R | Rnk | Year | Pos | Pld | W | D | L | GF | GA |
|---|---|---|---|---|---|---|---|---|---|---|---|---|---|---|---|---|---|---|---|
| 2023–24 | A | 2 | 2nd | 6 | 3 | 1 | 2 | 7 | 7 | Same position | 8th | (Europe) 2024 | Did not qualify | | | | | | |
| 2025 | A | 1 | 3rd | 8 | 3 | 0 | 5 | 7 | 17 | * | 11th | (Europe) 2025 | Did not qualify | | | | | | |
| Total | | | | 14 | 6 | 1 | 7 | 14 | 24 | 8th and 11th | | Total | – | – | – | – | – | – | – |

| ▲ | Promoted at end of season |
| Same position | No movement at end of season |
| ▼ | Relegated at end of season |
| * | Participated in promotion/relegation play-offs |

=== Invitational trophies ===
- Cyprus Women's Cup: Winner 2016

== See also ==
- Sport in Austria
  - Football in Austria
    - Women's football in Austria
- Austria women's national under-19 football team
- Austria women's national under-17 football team
- Austria national football team
