= Czech women's football clubs in international competitions =

This is a compilation of the results of the teams representing the Czech Republic at official international women's football competitions, that is the UEFA Women's Cup and its successor, the UEFA Women's Champions League.

As of the 2016–17 edition the Czech Republic is ranked 10th in the UWCL's association standings, and it is thus one of twelve associations currently granted two spots in the competition. It has been represented by just two teams, Slavia and Sparta, which have dominated the Czech First Division to date. Both teams have made appearances in the quarterfinals.

== Progression by season ==
Season	Teams	Earlier rounds	Round of 32	Round of 16	Quarterfinals	Semifinals	Final
2001–02 UWC	Sparta Prague		(Sweden) Umeå ^{1}				
2002–03 UWC	Sparta Prague		(Sweden) Umeå ^{1}				
2003–04 UWC	Slavia Prague		(Sweden) Umeå ^{1}				
2003–04 UWC	Slavia Prague		(Kazakhstan) Alma ^{1}				
2005–06 UWC	Sparta Prague		(Belarus) Universitet ^{1}	(Switzerland) Lucerne ^{1}	(Sweden) Djurgården		
2006–07 UWC	Sparta Prague			(Netherlands) Saestum ^{1}			
2007–08 UWC	Sparta Prague		(Romania) Clujana ^{1}	(France) Lyon ^{1}			
2008–09 UWC	Sparta Prague		(Spain) Levante ^{1}				
2009–10 UWCL	Sparta Prague		(Kazakhstan) Alma	(England) Arsenal			
2010–11 UWCL	Sparta Prague		(Belgium) Sint-Truidense	(Sweden) Linköping			
2011–12 UWCL	Sparta Prague		(Cyprus) Apollon	(France) Lyon			
2012–13 UWCL	Sparta Prague		(Bosnia and Herzegovina) Sarajevo	(Russia) Rossiyanka			
2013–14 UWCL	Sparta Prague		(Switzerland) Zürich				
2014–15 UWCL	Slavia Prague		(Spain) Barcelona				
2014–15 UWCL	Sparta Prague		(Lithuania) Universitetas				
2015–16 UWCL	Slavia Prague		(Denmark) Brøndby	(Russia) Zvezda	(France) Lyon		
2016–17 UWCL	Slavia Prague		(Cyprus) Apollon	(Sweden) Rosengård			
2016–17 UWCL	Sparta Prague		(Netherlands) Twente				
2017–18 UWCL	Slavia Prague		(Belarus) Minsk	(Iceland) Stjarnan			
2017–18 UWCL	Sparta Prague		(Greece) PAOK	(Sweden) Linköping			

^{1} Group stage. Highest-ranked eliminated team in case of qualification, lowest-ranked qualified team in case of elimination.

== Results by team ==
=== Slavia Prague ===
2003–04 UEFA Women's Cup
Round	Opponent	1st	2nd	Agg.	Scorers
Last 32 (group stage)	(Romania) Clujana	2–0			Chlumecká 2
Last 32 (group stage)	(Northern Ireland) Newtownabbey Strikers	3–0			Budosová - Mázlová - Pěničková
Last 32 (group stage)	(Sweden) Umeå (host)	1–2		6 points	Mocová

2004–05 UEFA Women's Cup
Round	Opponent	1st	2nd	Agg.	Scorers
Qualifiers (group stage)	(Slovakia) Žiar nad Hronom (host)	4–0			Chlumecká 2 - Jerábková - Ižová
Qualifiers (group stage)	(Bulgaria) Varna	3–0			Chlumecká 2 - Pěničková
Qualifiers (group stage)	(Kazakhstan) Alma	1–2		6 points	Zubková

2014–15 UEFA Women's Champions League
Round	Opponent	1st	2nd	Agg.	Scorers
Round of 32	(Spain) Barcelona	h: 0–1	a: 0–3	0–4	

2015–16 UEFA Women's Champions League
Round	Opponent	1st	2nd	Agg.	Scorers
Round of 32	(Denmark) Brøndby	a: 4–1	h: 0–1	4–2	Divišová 2 - Budošová - Chlastáková
Round of 16	(Russia) Zvezda Perm	h: 2–1	a: 0–0	2–1	Divišová - Necidová
Quarterfinals	(France) Olympique Lyonnais	a: 1–9	h: 0–0	1–9	Svitková

2016–17 UEFA Women's Champions League
Round	Opponent	1st	2nd	Agg.	Scorers
Round of 32	(Cyprus) Apollon Limassol	a: 1–1	h: 3–2	4–3	Svitková 2 - Divišová - Pincová
Round of 16	(Sweden) Rosengård	h: 1–3	a: 0–3	1–6	Svitková

2017–18 UEFA Women's Champions League
Round	Opponent	1st	2nd	Agg.	Scorers
Round of 32	(Belarus) Minsk	a: 3–1	h: 4–3	7–4	Svitková 4 – Cahynová 2 – Divišová
Round of 16	(Iceland) Stjarnan				

=== Sparta Prague ===
2001–02 UEFA Women's Cup
Round	Opponent	1st	2nd	Agg.	Scorers
Last 32 (group stage)	(Sweden) Umeå (host)	0–1			
Last 32 (group stage)	(Hungary) Femina Budapest	1–0			Macková
Last 32 (group stage)	(Bulgaria) Varna	7–0		6 points	Chlumecká 4 - Poincová 2 - Mazlová

2002–03 UEFA Women's Cup
Round	Opponent	1st	2nd	Agg.	Scorers
Last 32 (group stage)	(Estonia) Visa Tallinn	6–0			Došková 2 - Holan 2 - Knavová - Mouchová
Last 32 (group stage)	(Faroe Islands) KÍ	4–0			Holan 2 - Došková - Knavová
Last 32 (group stage)	(Sweden) Umeå (host)	1–6		6 points	L. Martínková

2005–06 UEFA Women's Cup
Round	Opponent	1st	2nd	Agg.	Scorers
Qualifiers (group stage)	(Romania) Clujana	1–1			Ciglbauerová
Qualifiers (group stage)	(Lithuania) Gintra Universitetas	8–0			Bertholdová 2 - Knavová 2 - Ciglbauerová - Kohoutová - Matysová
Qualifiers (group stage)	(Belarus) Universitet Vitebsk (host)	3–0		9 points	Mocová 2 - I. Martínková
Last 16 (group stage)	(Azerbaijan) Gömrükçü Baku	3–0			Ciglbauerová - Mocová - Mouchová
Last 16 (group stage)	(Germany) Frankfurt	1–1			Ringelová
Last 16 (group stage)	(Switzerland) LUwin.ch (host)	1–0		7 points	Bertholdová
Quarterfinals	(Sweden) Djurgården	h: 0–2	a: 0–0	0–2	

2006–07 UEFA Women's Cup
Round	Opponent	1st	2nd	Agg.	Scorers
Last 16 (group stage)	(Netherlands) Saestum (host)	1–3			Došková
Last 16 (group stage)	(Belgium) Rapide Wezemaal	2–4			I. Martínová - Mocová
Last 16 (group stage)	(Germany) Turbine Potsdam	0–4		0 points	

2007–08 UEFA Women's Cup
Round	Opponent	1st	2nd	Agg.	Scorers
Qualifiers (group stage)	(Romania) Clujana	1–1			L. Martínková
Qualifiers (group stage)	(Cyprus) AEK Kokkinochorion	19–0			Bertholdová 3 - Heroldová 3 - L. Martínková 3 - Došková 2 - Kladrubská 2 - Ondrušová 2 - Knavová - I. Martínková - Pivoňková - Ringelová
Qualifiers (group stage)	(Israel) Maccabi Holon (host)	4–3		9 points	Bertholdová - Kladrubská - L. Martínková - Ringelová
Last 16 (group stage)	(Norway) Kolbotn	1–3			Kladrubská
Last 16 (group stage)	(Denmark) Brøndby	1–2			Mouchová
Last 16 (group stage)	(France) Olympique Lyon (host)	1–2		0 points	Bertholdová

2008–09 UEFA Women's Cup
Round	Opponent	1st	2nd	Agg.	Scorers
Qualifiers (group stage)	(Belgium) Tienen	3–1			
Qualifiers (group stage)	(North Macedonia) Skiponjat (host)	9–0			
Qualifiers (group stage)	(Spain) Levante	0–0		7 points	

2009–10 UEFA Women's Champions League
Round	Opponent	1st	2nd	Agg.	Scorers
Round of 32	(Kazakhstan) Alma	a: 0–1	h: 2–0	2–1	Ondrušová 2
Round of 16	(England) Arsenal	h: 0–3	a: 0–2	0–5	

2010–11 UEFA Women's Champions League
Round	Opponent	1st	2nd	Agg.	Scorers
Round of 32	(Belgium) Sint-Truidense	a: 3–0	h: 7–0	10–0	L. Martínková 3 - Ondrušová 2 - Culová - Došková - Kozarová - I. Martínková - Pivoňková
Round of 16	(Sweden) Linköping	a: 0–2	h: 0–1	0–3	

2011–12 UEFA Women's Champions League
Round	Opponent	1st	2nd	Agg.	Scorers
Round of 32	(Cyprus) Apollon Limassol	a: 2–2	h: 2–1	4–3	L. Martínková 3 - Danihelková
Round of 16	(France) Olympique Lyonnais	h: 0–6	a: 0–6	0–12	

2012–13 UEFA Women's Champions League
Round	Opponent	1st	2nd	Agg.	Scorers
Round of 32	(Bosnia and Herzegovina) Sarajevo	a: 3–0	h: 3–0	6–0	L. Martínková 3 - Voňková 2 - Danihelková
Round of 16	(Russia) Rossiyanka	h: 0–1	a: 2–2	2–3	Danihelková - Voňková

2013–14 UEFA Women's Champions League
Round	Opponent	1st	2nd	Agg.	Scorers
Round of 32	(Switzerland) Zürich	h: 1–1	a: 1–2	2–3	Bartoňová - Mocová

2014–15 UEFA Women's Champions League
Round	Opponent	1st	2nd	Agg.	Scorers
Round of 32	(Lithuania) Gintra Universitetas	a: 1–1	h: 1–1 (aet)	2–2 (p: 4–5)	Bertholdová - Křivská

2016–17 UEFA Women's Champions League
Round	Opponent	1st	2nd	Agg.	Scorers
Round of 32	(Netherlands) Twente	a: 0–2	h: 1–3	1–5	Stašková

2017–18 UEFA Women's Champions League
Round	Opponent	1st	2nd	Agg.	Scorers
Round of 32	(Greece) PAOK	a: 5–0	h: 3–0	8–0	I. Martínková 3 – Stašková 2 – Hälinen – Kladrubská – Mocová
Round of 16	(Sweden) Linköping				
