= List of Czech Republic women's international footballers =

This is a list of Czech international footballers, comprising all players to have represented the Czech Republic women's national football team since its formation in 1993.

== List of players ==
This table takes into account all Czech Republic women's official international matches played up to and including 30 October 2013

| Name | Date of birth | Caps | Goals | First cap | Opponent | Last cap | Opponent | Ref |
|---|---|---|---|---|---|---|---|---|
| Eva Šmeralová | 24 August 1976 | 71 | 13 | 21 June 1993 | Slovakia | 26 June 2008 | Belarus | |
| Gabriela Chlumecká | 24 April 1975 | 66 | 51 | 21 June 1993 | Slovakia | 26 May 2007 | Northern Ireland | |
| Zuzana Pincová | 6 October 1973 | 63 | 0 | 21 June 1993 | Slovakia | 27 October 2007 | Spain | |
| Kateřina Došková | 20 February 1982 | 62 | 9 | 15 August 1999 | Slovakia | 25 August 2010 | Azerbaijan | |
| Lucie Martínková | 19 September 1986 | 55 | 12 | 8 June 2003 | Ukraine | | | |
| Lucie Heroldová | 20 February 1982 | 51 | 3 | 27 May 2000 | Republic of Ireland | 28 November 2010 | Hungary | |
| Pavlína Ščasná | 3 April 1982 | 50 | 24 | 25 April 1998 | Scotland | 29 October 2008 | Italy | |
| Irena Martínková | 19 September 1986 | 49 | 8 | 8 June 2003 | Ukraine | | | |
| Petra Bertholdová | 24 November 1984 | 46 | 2 | 24 March 2002 | Norway | | | |
| Martina Jedličková | 3 April 1982 | 44 | 14 | 21 June 1993 | Slovakia | 26 May 2002 | Ukraine | |
| Blanka Pěničková | 11 April 1980 | 43 | 7 | 25 April 1999 | Austria | 23 September 2009 | Wales | |
| Iveta Dudová | 26 December 1977 | 40 | 19 | 3 October 1994 | Austria | 26 May 2002 | Ukraine | |
| Martina Danielová | 25 October 1980 | 38 | 5 | 10 March 2001 | Greece | 23 September 2009 | Wales | |
| Iva Mocová | 23 August 1980 | 38 | 7 | 19 April 2003 | Finland | | | |
| Veronika Hoferková | 20 January 1982 | 34 | 1 | 6 December 2003 | Portugal | | | |
| Lenka Zahoříková | 31 July 1979 | 31 | 1 | 7 May 1996 | Slovakia | 29 August 2003 | Germany | |
| Petra Divišová | 5 June 1984 | 30 | 10 | 7 April 2007 | Switzerland | | | |
| Alexandra Mouchová | 22 May 1985 | 30 | 5 | 24 March 2002 | Norway | 27 October 2007 | Spain | |
| Petra Vyštejnová | 12 November 1990 | 30 | 0 | 25 October 2008 | Italy | | | |
| Pavla Macková | 3 March 1982 | 29 | 2 | 25 April 1998 | Scotland | 6 December 2003 | Portugal | |
| Petra Polášková | 22 June 1979 | 29 | 0 | 26 March 1997 | Germany | 4 February 2005 | Romania | |
| Marie Tlachová | 8 February 1968 | 29 | 3 | 21 June 1993 | Slovakia | 10 January 2000 | Australia | |
| Veronika Pincová | 15 November 1989 | 28 | 3 | 27 October 2007 | Spain | | | |
| Dagmar Urbancová | 23 May 1983 | 27 | 4 | 27 May 2000 | Republic of Ireland | 26 May 2005 | England | |
| Petra Zuzaníková | 28 December 1966 | 27 | 12 | 21 June 1993 | Slovakia | 23 May 1998 | Scotland | |
| Simona Kohoutová | 19 March 1972 | 23 | 4 | 14 May 1994 | Hungary | 13 January 2000 | Sweden | |
| Adéla Pivoňková | 28 September 1991 | 23 | 8 | 26 June 2008 | Belarus | | | |
| Alena Petranová | 26 September 1970 | 22 | 1 | 4 September 1993 | Norway | 19 November 2000 | Yugoslavia | |
| Marcela Mázlová | 23 March 1971 | 21 | 2 | 4 September 1993 | Norway | 23 May 1998 | Scotland | |
| Ilona Gábrišová | 28 February 1969 | 20 | 5 | 21 June 1993 | Slovakia | 7 May 1997 | Slovakia | |
| Dagmar Hreňová | 21 May 1968 | 20 | 2 | 7 May 1996 | Slovakia | 13 January 2000 | Sweden | |
| Lucie Voňková | 28 February 1992 | 20 | 3 | 29 May 2009 | Poland | | | |
| Adéla Odehnalová | 2 January 1990 | 18 | 0 | 26 November 2009 | Belgium | | | |
| Kamila Valková | 19 May 1976 | 18 | 1 | 7 May 1995 | Hungary | 7 March 2004 | China | |
| Pavla Červenková | 24 June 1976 | 17 | 0 | 7 May 1997 | Slovakia | 5 June 2004 | Ukraine | |
| Lucie Kladrubská | 30 June 1987 | 17 | 2 | 27 August 2005 | Belarus | 26 November 2009 | Belgium | |
| Simona Minksová | 5 August 1974 | 17 | 7 | 23 April 1994 | Finland | 23 May 1998 | Scotland | |
| Markéta Ringelová | 25 July 1989 | 17 | 2 | 26 August 2007 | Belarus | | | |
| Lenka Kaplanová | 4 November 1974 | 16 | 0 | 21 June 1993 | Slovakia | 14 June 2001 | Netherlands | |
| Milena Žofčínová | 25 June 1962 | 16 | 0 | 23 April 1994 | Finland | 28 September 1996 | Netherlands | |
| Klára Cahynová | 20 December 1993 | 15 | 0 | 3 June 2011 | Nigeria | | | |
| Monika Cvernová | 30 July 1990 | 16 | 2 | 20 March 2009 | Slovakia | 9 March 2015 | South Africa | |
| Jana Sedláčková | 21 January 1993 | 14 | 1 | 26 November 2009 | Belgium | | | |
| Pavla Benýrová | 29 September 1989 | 13 | 0 | 25 October 2008 | Italy | | | |
| Petra Taušová | 24 September 1983 | 13 | 0 | 10 March 2001 | Greece | 4 April 2012 | Denmark | |
