= 2020 Cyprus Women's Cup squads =

List of players competing at the 13th edition of the Cyprus Women's Cup

This article lists the squads for the 2020 Cyprus Women's Cup, the 13th edition of the Cyprus Women's Cup. The cup consisted of a series of friendly games, and was held in Cyprus from 5 to 11 March 2020. The five national teams involved in the tournament registered a squad of 23 players.

The age listed for each player is on 5 March 2020, the first day of the tournament. The numbers of caps and goals listed for each player do not include any matches played after the start of tournament. The club listed is the club for which the player last played a competitive match prior to the tournament. The nationality for each club reflects the national association (not the league) to which the club is affiliated. A flag is included for coaches that are of a different nationality than their own national team.

== Squads ==
=== Croatia ===
Coach: Mate Prskalo

The squad was announced on 2 March 2020.

No.	Pos.	Player	Date of birth (age)	Club
1	GK	Anamarija Mišetić	4 June 1993 (aged 26)	(Croatia) Split
2	DF	Lea Zdunić	10 December 1998 (aged 21)	(Croatia) Dinamo Zagreb
3	DF	Ana Jelenčić	8 June 1994 (aged 25)	(Spain) Sporting Huelva
4	DF	Leonarda Balog	5 February 1993 (aged 27)	(Austria) St. Pölten
5	DF	Kristina Nevrkla	5 July 1990 (aged 29)	(Croatia) Osijek
6	MF	Mihaela Horvat	21 March 1994 (aged 25)	(Austria) SV Horn
7	FW	Ana Dujmović	21 February 1996 (aged 24)	(Croatia) Split
8	DF	Matea Bošnjak	21 December 1997 (aged 22)	(Croatia) Split
9	FW	Ivana Rudelić	25 January 1992 (aged 28)	(Germany) Bayer Leverkusen
10	MF	Iva Landeka	3 October 1989 (aged 30)	(France) Montpellier
11	FW	Kristina Šundov	17 September 1986 (aged 33)	(Switzerland) Basel
12	GK	Jelena Kešina	20 August 1996 (aged 23)	(Croatia) Neretva
13	MF	Helena Spajić	8 February 2000 (aged 20)	(Austria) SV Horn
14	DF	Antonia Dulčić	4 February 1997 (aged 23)	(Croatia) Split
15	MF	Iva Bukač	27 November 1994 (aged 25)	(Croatia) Split
16	MF	Petra Pezelj	28 October 1998 (aged 21)	(Croatia) Split
17	MF	Izabela Lojna	11 May 1992 (aged 27)	(Croatia) Osijek
22	MF	Anela Lubina	18 December 1995 (aged 24)	(Croatia) Split
23	GK	Stephanie Bukovec	22 September 1995 (aged 24)	(Netherlands) Ajax

=== Czech Republic ===
Coach: Karel Rada

The squad was announced on 20 February 2020. On 28 February 2020, third goalkeeper Ivana Pižlová and forward Gabriela Šlajsová were added to the squad, while Andrea Jarchovská, Irena Martínková, and Markéta Ringelová were replaced by Markéta Klímová, Eliška Janíková, and Denisa Veselá for health reasons.

No.	Pos.	Player	Date of birth (age)	Caps	Goals	Club
1	GK	Ivana Pižlová	13 December 1981 (aged 38)	2	0	(Czech Republic) Sparta Prague
2	DF	Markéta Klímová	8 June 1999 (aged 20)	2	0	(Czech Republic) Slovácko
3	DF	Eliška Sonntagová	26 July 2001 (aged 18)	6	0	(Czech Republic) Sparta Prague
4	DF	Petra Bertholdová	24 November 1984 (aged 35)	83	4	(Czech Republic) Sparta Prague
5	FW	Gabriela Šlajsová	7 April 2000 (aged 19)	0	0	(Czech Republic) Viktoria Plzeň
6	MF	Eva Bartoňová	17 October 1993 (aged 26)	54	4	(Italy) Inter Milan
7	FW	Lucie Martínková	19 September 1986 (aged 33)	94	21	(Czech Republic) Sparta Prague
8	DF	Jana Sedláčková	21 January 1993 (aged 27)	47	3	(Germany) USV Jena
9	FW	Lucie Voňková	28 February 1992 (aged 28)	61	16	(Netherlands) Ajax
10	MF	Kateřina Svitková	20 March 1996 (aged 23)	34	17	(Czech Republic) Slavia Prague
11	MF	Kamila Dubcová	17 January 1999 (aged 21)	14	6	(Italy) Sassuolo
12	MF	Klára Cahynová	20 December 1993 (aged 26)	62	4	(Germany) Turbine Potsdam
14	FW	Franny Černá	22 July 1997 (aged 22)	1	0	(Czech Republic) Slavia Prague
15	MF	Antonie Stárová	12 October 1998 (aged 21)	17	1	(United States) NC State Wolfpack
16	GK	Barbora Růžičková	20 April 1998 (aged 21)	6	0	(Czech Republic) Slovácko
17	MF	Eliška Janíková	11 July 1998 (aged 21)	1	0	(Czech Republic) Slovácko
18	MF	Michaela Dubcová	17 January 1999 (aged 21)	7	0	(Italy) Sassuolo
19	DF	Simona Necidová	20 January 1994 (aged 26)	25	1	(Czech Republic) Slavia Prague
20	MF	Michaela Khýrová	3 February 2000 (aged 20)	2	0	(Czech Republic) Slavia Prague
21	FW	Andrea Stašková	12 May 2000 (aged 19)	10	2	(Italy) Juventus
22	MF	Denisa Veselá	8 January 1998 (aged 22)	8	0	(Czech Republic) Slavia Prague
23	GK	Alexandra Vaníčková	15 June 1997 (aged 22)	8	0	(Czech Republic) Sparta Prague
	DF	Jitka Chlastáková	13 October 1993 (aged 26)	49	6	(Germany) USV Jena

=== Finland ===
Coach: (Sweden) Anna Signeul

The squad was announced on 25 February 2020. Nea Lehtola replaced Olga Ahtinen on 29 February 2020. On 5 March 2020, Tuija Hyyrynen was withdrawn from the squad due to injury and replaced with Jutta Rantala. On 7 March 2020, Adelina Engman withdrew from the squad due to injury, returning to London to rehabilitate.

No.	Pos.	Player	Date of birth (age)	Caps	Goals	Club
1	GK	Paula Myllyoja	20 May 1984 (aged 35)	2	0	(Italy) Pink Bari
2	DF	Elli Pikkujämsä	24 October 1999 (aged 20)	2	0	(Sweden) KIF Örebro
4	MF	Ria Öling	15 September 1994 (aged 25)	39	6	(Sweden) Växjö
5	MF	Emma Koivisto	25 September 1994 (aged 25)	54	2	(Sweden) Kopparbergs/Göteborg
6	DF	Anna Auvinen	2 March 1987 (aged 33)	16	0	(Italy) Inter Milan
7	FW	Adelina Engman	11 October 1994 (aged 25)	68	7	(England) Chelsea
7	FW	Jutta Rantala	11 November 1999 (aged 20)	0	0	(Sweden) Kristianstad
8	DF	Nea Lehtola	24 October 1998 (aged 21)	0	0	(Finland) HJK
9	FW	Juliette Kemppi	14 May 1994 (aged 25)	52	4	(England) London City Lionesses
10	MF	Emmi Alanen	30 April 1991 (aged 28)	76	19	(Sweden) Växjö
11	MF	Nora Heroum	20 July 1994 (aged 25)	72	1	(Italy) Milan
12	GK	Anna Tamminen	30 October 1994 (aged 25)	5	0	(Finland) Åland United
13	MF	Linda Nyman	21 January 1994 (aged 26)	6	0	(Italy) Inter Milan
14	MF	Julia Tunturi	25 April 1996 (aged 23)	25	0	(Sweden) Eskilstuna United
15	MF	Natalia Kuikka	1 December 1995 (aged 24)	51	3	(Sweden) Kopparbergs/Göteborg
16	DF	Anna Westerlund	9 April 1989 (aged 30)	124	3	(Finland) Åland United
17	FW	Sanni Franssi	19 March 1995 (aged 24)	38	2	(Denmark) Fortuna Hjørring
18	FW	Linda Sällström	13 July 1988 (aged 31)	101	45	(France) Paris FC
19	FW	Kaisa Collin	16 April 1997 (aged 22)	21	2	(Sweden) Eskilstuna United
20	MF	Eveliina Summanen	29 May 1998 (aged 21)	20	2	(Sweden) Kristianstad
21	MF	Iina Salmi	12 October 1994 (aged 25)	11	1	(Netherlands) Ajax
22	FW	Heidi Kollanen	6 June 1997 (aged 22)	10	2	(Sweden) KIF Örebro
23	GK	Tinja-Riikka Korpela	5 May 1986 (aged 33)	91	0	(England) Everton

=== Mexico ===
Coach: Christopher Cuéllar

The squad was announced on 27 February 2020.

No.	Pos.	Player	Date of birth (age)	Caps	Goals	Club
1	GK	Cecilia Santiago	19 October 1994 (aged 25)	62	0	(Netherlands) PSV Eindhoven
2	DF	Kenti Robles	15 February 1991 (aged 29)	70	3	(Spain) Atlético Madrid
3	DF	Arianna Romero	29 July 1992 (aged 27)	44	1	(Australia) Perth Glory
4	DF	Kimberly Rodriguez	26 March 1999 (aged 20)	5	1	(United States) Oklahoma State Cowgirls
5	DF	Jimena López	30 January 1999 (aged 21)	18	1	(United States) Texas A&M Aggies
6	MF	Alexia Delgado	9 December 1999 (aged 20)	5	0	(United States) Arizona State Sun Devils
7	MF	Mirelle Arciniega	13 August 1992 (aged 27)	0	0	(Mexico) Puebla
8	MF	Bri Campos	3 February 1994 (aged 26)	1	0	(Sweden) Umeå
9	FW	Kiana Palacios	1 October 1996 (aged 23)	18	2	(Spain) Real Sociedad
10	MF	Yamile Franco	7 July 1992 (aged 27)	9	0	(Mexico) León
11	FW	Viridiana Salazar	2 January 1998 (aged 22)	0	0	(Mexico) Pachuca
12	GK	Itzel González	14 August 1994 (aged 25)	2	0	(Mexico) Tijuana
13	DF	Ana Lozada	22 July 1997 (aged 22)	0	0	(Mexico) América
14	MF	Jennifer Muñoz	4 November 1996 (aged 23)	0	0	(Mexico) América
15	DF	Monica Flores	31 January 1996 (aged 24)	9	0	(Spain) Valencia
16	MF	Amanda Pérez	31 July 1994 (aged 25)	5	0	(Portugal) Sporting CP
17	MF	Mariela Jiménez	13 December 1997 (aged 22)	0	0	(Mexico) UNAM
18	MF	Diana García	11 November 1999 (aged 20)	0	0	(Mexico) León
19	FW	Atzimba Casas	14 September 1994 (aged 25)	0	0	(Mexico) Juárez
20	MF	Brenda León	8 September 1993 (aged 26)	0	0	(Mexico) Cruz Azul

=== Slovakia ===
Coach: Peter Kopún

The squad was announced on 3 March 2020. Milan-based Mária Korenčiová withdrew from the squad due to coronavirus fears and was replaced by Tamara Solárová.

No.	Pos.	Player	Date of birth (age)	Club
1	GK	Lucia El-Dahaibiová	22 January 1989 (aged 31)	(Austria) Landhaus Wien
2	DF	Lucia Haršányová	27 August 1990 (aged 29)	(Germany) MSV Duisburg
3	MF	Laura Bieliková	22 January 2000 (aged 20)	(Czech Republic) Slovácko
4	DF	Monika Havranová	4 April 1997 (aged 22)	(Slovakia) Partizán Bardejov
5	DF	Alexandra Bíróová	13 July 1991 (aged 28)	(Austria) St. Pölten
6	MF	Diana Lemešová	4 October 2000 (aged 19)	(Austria) Altenmarkt
7	DF	Patrícia Fischerová	26 August 1993 (aged 26)	(Poland) Czarni Sosnowiec
8	FW	Klaudia Fabová	12 September 1998 (aged 21)	(Poland) Wałbrzych
9	MF	Dominika Koleničková	24 September 1992 (aged 27)	(Slovakia) Slovan Bratislava
10	FW	Andrea Bogorová	27 February 2000 (aged 20)	(Slovakia) Spartak Myjava
11	MF	Patrícia Hmírová	30 November 1993 (aged 26)	(Poland) Górnik Łęczna
12	GK	Tamara Solárová	13 September 1999 (aged 20)	(Slovakia) Partizán Bardejov
13	MF	Kristína Košíková	10 December 1993 (aged 26)	(Czech Republic) Slovan Liberec
14	DF	Petra Zdechovanová	2 November 1995 (aged 24)	(Poland) Mitech Żywiec
15	DF	Monika Bytčánková	14 May 1998 (aged 21)	(Slovakia) Slovan Bratislava
16	DF	Diana Bartovičová	20 May 1993 (aged 26)	(Czech Republic) Slavia Prague
17	MF	Mária Mikolajová	13 June 1999 (aged 20)	(Austria) St. Pölten
18	MF	Dominika Škorvánková	21 August 1991 (aged 28)	(Germany) Bayern Munich
19	DF	Jana Vojteková	12 August 1991 (aged 28)	(Germany) SC Freiburg
20	DF	Andrea Horváthová	5 October 1995 (aged 24)	(Poland) Czarni Sosnowiec
21	MF	Martina Šurnovská	10 February 1999 (aged 21)	(Cyprus) Apollon Limassol
22	FW	Veronika Sluková	15 December 1998 (aged 21)	(Austria) Landhaus Wien
23	GK	Patrícia Chládeková	4 April 1997 (aged 22)	(Germany) 1. FC Saarbrücken

== Player representation ==
=== By club ===
Clubs with 3 or more players represented are listed.

Players	Club
7	(Croatia) Split
6	(Czech Republic) Slavia Prague
5	(Czech Republic) Sparta Prague
4	(Czech Republic) Slovácko
3	(Austria) St. Pölten, (Italy) Inter Milan, (Netherlands) Ajax

=== By club nationality ===
Players	Clubs
17	Czech Republic
11	Croatia, Sweden
10	Mexico
8	Austria, Germany, Italy
5	Poland, Slovakia
4	Netherlands, Spain, United States
3	England, Finland
2	France
1	Australia, Cyprus, Denmark, Portugal, Switzerland

=== By club federation ===
Players	Federation
93	UEFA
14	CONCACAF
1	AFC

=== By representatives of domestic league ===
National squad	Players
Czech Republic	14
Croatia	11
Mexico	10
Slovakia	5
Finland	3
