= 2022 SheBelieves Cup squads =

List of players competing at the 7th edition of the SheBelieves Cup

This article lists the squads for the 2022 SheBelieves Cup, the 7th edition of the SheBelieves Cup. The cup consisted of a series of friendly games, and was held in the United States from 17 to 23 February 2022. The four national teams involved in the tournament registered a squad of 23 players.

The age listed for each player is on 17 February 2022, the first day of the tournament. The numbers of caps and goals listed for each player do not include any matches played after the start of tournament. The club listed is the club for which the player last played a competitive match prior to the tournament. The nationality for each club reflects the national association (not the league) to which the club is affiliated. A flag is included for coaches that are of a different nationality than their own national team.

== Squads ==
=== Czech Republic ===
Coach: Karel Rada

The 23-player squad was announced on 2 February 2022. On 15 February 2022, Lucie Jelínková was replaced by Kateřina Bužková.

No.	Pos.	Player	Date of birth (age)	Caps	Goals	Club
1	GK	Barbora Votíková	13 September 1996 (aged 25)	33	0	(French Football Federation) Paris Saint-Germain
2	DF	Anna Dlasková	6 October 1995 (aged 26)	19	1	(Football Association of the Czech Republic) Sparta Prague
3	DF	Kateřina Kotrčová	27 April 2000 (aged 21)	0	0	(Football Association of the Czech Republic) Sparta Prague
4	DF	Petra Bertholdová (captain)	24 November 1984 (aged 37)	103	4	(Football Association of the Czech Republic) Sparta Prague
5	DF	Gabriela Šlajsová	7 April 2000 (aged 21)	11	0	(Football Association of the Czech Republic) Slavia Prague
6	DF	Michaela Khýrová	3 February 2000 (aged 22)	5	0	(Football Association of the Czech Republic) Slavia Prague
7	FW	Lucie Martínková	19 September 1986 (aged 35)	113	25	(Football Association of the Czech Republic) Sparta Prague
8	MF	Aneta Pochmanová	12 April 2001 (aged 20)	8	0	(Football Association of the Czech Republic) Sparta Prague
9	FW	Andrea Stašková	12 May 2000 (aged 21)	25	8	(Italian Football Federation) Juventus
10	MF	Kateřina Svitková	20 March 1996 (aged 25)	47	21	(The Football Association) West Ham United
11	MF	Tereza Krejčiříková	21 June 1996 (aged 25)	34	5	(Football Association of the Czech Republic) Slavia Prague
12	MF	Klára Cahynová	20 December 1993 (aged 28)	78	7	(Royal Spanish Football Federation) Sevilla
13	MF	Jitka Chlastáková	13 October 1993 (aged 28)	53	6	(Football Association of the Czech Republic) Sparta Prague
14	FW	Klára Cvrčková	25 July 2001 (aged 20)	2	1	(Football Association of the Czech Republic) Sparta Prague
15	MF	Antonie Stárová	12 October 1998 (aged 23)	19	1	(United States Soccer Federation) NC State Wolfpack
16	GK	Olivie Lukášová	4 June 2001 (aged 20)	1	0	(Football Association of the Czech Republic) Slavia Prague
17	MF	Tereza Szewieczková	4 May 1998 (aged 23)	31	7	(Football Association of the Czech Republic) Slavia Prague
18	MF	Kamila Dubcová	17 January 1999 (aged 23)	28	9	(Italian Football Federation) Sassuolo
19	DF	Simona Necidová	20 January 1994 (aged 28)	32	2	(Football Association of the Czech Republic) Slavia Prague
20	MF	Kateřina Bužková	19 March 1996 (aged 25)	23	0	(Football Association of the Czech Republic) Sparta Prague
21	FW	Miroslava Mrázová	19 February 1999 (aged 22)	9	1	(Football Association of the Czech Republic) Viktoria Plzeň
22	MF	Franny Černá	22 July 1997 (aged 24)	10	0	(Football Association of the Czech Republic) Slavia Prague
23	GK	Alexandra Vaníčková	15 June 1997 (aged 24)	10	0	(Football Association of the Czech Republic) Sparta Prague

=== Iceland ===
Coach: Þorsteinn Halldórsson

Iceland's 23-player squad was announced on 4 February 2022.

No.	Pos.	Player	Date of birth (age)	Caps	Goals	Club
1	GK	Sandra Sigurðardóttir	2 October 1986 (aged 35)	39	0	(Football Association of Iceland) Valur
2	DF	Sif Atladóttir	15 July 1985 (aged 36)	84	0	(Football Association of Iceland) Selfoss
3	DF	Elísa Viðarsdóttir	26 May 1991 (aged 30)	43	0	(Football Association of Iceland) Valur
4	DF	Glódís Perla Viggósdóttir	27 June 1995 (aged 26)	97	6	(German Football Association) Bayern Munich
5	MF	Gunnhildur Yrsa Jónsdóttir (captain)	28 September 1988 (aged 33)	84	12	(United States Soccer Federation) Orlando Pride
6	DF	Ingibjörg Sigurðardóttir	7 October 1997 (aged 24)	41	0	(Norwegian Football Federation) Vålerenga
7	MF	Karitas Tómasdóttir	19 September 1995 (aged 26)	7	0	(Football Association of Iceland) Breiðablik
8	FW	Karólína Lea Vilhjálmsdóttir	8 August 2001 (aged 20)	13	5	(German Football Association) Bayern Munich
9	FW	Berglind Björg Þorvaldsdóttir	18 January 1992 (aged 30)	57	9	(Norwegian Football Federation) Brann
10	MF	Dagný Brynjarsdóttir	10 August 1991 (aged 30)	97	32	(The Football Association) West Ham United
11	DF	Hallbera Guðný Gísladóttir	14 September 1986 (aged 35)	123	3	(Swedish Football Association) Kalmar
12	GK	Telma Ívarsdóttir	30 March 1999 (aged 22)	0	0	(Football Association of Iceland) Breiðablik
13	GK	Cecilía Rán Rúnarsdóttir	26 July 2003 (aged 18)	5	0	(German Football Association) Bayern Munich
14	MF	Selma Sól Magnúsdóttir	23 April 1998 (aged 23)	16	1	(Norwegian Football Federation) Rosenborg
15	MF	Alexandra Jóhannsdóttir	19 March 2000 (aged 21)	19	3	(German Football Association) Eintracht Frankfurt
16	MF	Amanda Andradóttir	18 December 2003 (aged 18)	3	0	(Swedish Football Association) Kristianstad
17	MF	Agla María Albertsdóttir	5 August 1999 (aged 22)	42	3	(Swedish Football Association) Häcken
18	DF	Guðrún Arnardóttir	29 July 1995 (aged 26)	13	1	(Swedish Football Association) Rosengård
19	DF	Natasha Anasi	2 October 1991 (aged 30)	4	0	(Football Association of Iceland) Breiðablik
20	DF	Ásta Eir Árnadóttir	23 August 1993 (aged 28)	8	0	(Football Association of Iceland) Breiðablik
21	FW	Svava Rós Guðmundsdóttir	11 November 1995 (aged 26)	30	2	(Norwegian Football Federation) Brann
22	MF	Ída Marín Hermannsdóttir	13 July 2002 (aged 19)	1	0	(Football Association of Iceland) Valur
23	FW	Sveindís Jane Jónsdóttir	5 June 2001 (aged 20)	13	6	(German Football Association) VfL Wolfsburg

=== New Zealand ===
Coach: (Czech Republic) Jitka Klimková

The 23-player squad was announced on 8 February 2022.

No.	Pos.	Player	Date of birth (age)	Caps	Goals	Club
1	GK	Erin Nayler	17 April 1992 (aged 29)	74	0	(Swedish Football Association) Umeå
2	DF	Ria Percival	7 December 1989 (aged 32)	157	15	(The Football Association) Tottenham Hotspur
3	DF	Claudia Bunge	21 September 1999 (aged 22)	5	0	(Football Australia) Melbourne Victory
4	DF	C. J. Bott	22 April 1995 (aged 26)	31	1	Unattached
5	DF	Meikayla Moore	4 June 1996 (aged 25)	48	3	(The Football Association) Liverpool
6	DF	Rebekah Stott	17 June 1993 (aged 28)	81	4	(Football Australia) Melbourne City
7	DF	Ali Riley	30 October 1987 (aged 34)	140	1	(United States Soccer Federation) Angel City
8	DF	Abby Erceg	20 November 1989 (aged 32)	144	6	(United States Soccer Federation) North Carolina Courage
9	FW	Gabi Rennie	7 July 2001 (aged 20)	7	2	(United States Soccer Federation) Arizona State Sun Devils
10	FW	Jacqui Hand	19 February 1999 (aged 22)	4	1	Unattached
11	MF	Olivia Chance	5 October 1993 (aged 28)	26	1	(Scottish Football Association) Celtic
12	MF	Betsy Hassett	4 August 1990 (aged 31)	126	14	(Football Association of Iceland) Stjarnan
13	FW	Paige Satchell	13 April 1998 (aged 23)	23	2	(Football Australia) Sydney FC
14	DF	Katie Bowen	15 April 1994 (aged 27)	77	3	(United States Soccer Federation) North Carolina Courage
15	MF	Daisy Cleverley	30 April 1997 (aged 24)	16	2	Unattached
16	MF	Emma Rolston	10 November 1996 (aged 25)	8	6	Unattached
17	FW	Hannah Wilkinson	28 May 1992 (aged 29)	100	26	(Football Australia) Melbourne City
18	MF	Ava Collins	26 April 2002 (aged 19)	4	0	(United States Soccer Federation) St. John's Red Storm
19	DF	Elizabeth Anton	12 December 1998 (aged 23)	5	0	(Football Australia) Perth Glory
20	MF	Malia Steinmetz	18 January 1999 (aged 23)	4	0	(Football Australia) Western Sydney Wanderers
21	GK	Victoria Esson	6 March 1991 (aged 30)	4	0	(German Football Association) SC Sand
22	DF	Ashleigh Ward	18 August 1994 (aged 27)	1	0	(The Football Association) Actonians
23	GK	Lily Alfeld	4 August 1995 (aged 26)	0	0	(New Zealand Football) Wellington Phoenix

=== United States ===
Coach: (North Macedonia) Vlatko Andonovski

The 23-player squad was announced on 3 February 2022. A few days later, Abby Dahlkemper withdrew from the squad due to a back injury, and was replaced by Trinity Rodman.

No.	Pos.	Player	Date of birth (age)	Caps	Goals	Club
1	GK	Alyssa Naeher	April 20, 1988 (aged 33)	78	0	(United States Soccer Federation) Chicago Red Stars
2	FW	Trinity Rodman	May 20, 2002 (aged 19)	0	0	(United States Soccer Federation) Washington Spirit
3	FW	Lynn Williams	May 21, 1993 (aged 28)	45	14	(United States Soccer Federation) Kansas City Current
4	DF	Becky Sauerbrunn (captain)	June 6, 1985 (aged 36)	199	0	(United States Soccer Federation) Portland Thorns
5	DF	Kelley O'Hara	August 4, 1988 (aged 33)	148	2	(United States Soccer Federation) Washington Spirit
6	MF	Morgan Gautrat	February 26, 1993 (aged 28)	87	8	(United States Soccer Federation) Chicago Red Stars
7	FW	Ashley Hatch	May 25, 1995 (aged 26)	4	2	(United States Soccer Federation) Washington Spirit
8	DF	Sofia Huerta	December 14, 1992 (aged 29)	9	0	(United States Soccer Federation) OL Reign
9	FW	Mallory Pugh	April 29, 1998 (aged 23)	67	18	(United States Soccer Federation) Chicago Red Stars
10	MF	Jaelin Howell	November 21, 1999 (aged 22)	2	0	(United States Soccer Federation) Racing Louisville
11	FW	Sophia Smith	August 10, 2000 (aged 21)	10	1	(United States Soccer Federation) Portland Thorns
12	DF	Tierna Davidson	September 19, 1998 (aged 23)	45	1	(United States Soccer Federation) Chicago Red Stars
13	MF	Ashley Sanchez	March 16, 1999 (aged 22)	2	0	(United States Soccer Federation) Washington Spirit
14	DF	Emily Sonnett	November 25, 1993 (aged 28)	63	0	(United States Soccer Federation) Washington Spirit
15	DF	Alana Cook	April 11, 1997 (aged 24)	4	0	(United States Soccer Federation) OL Reign
16	MF	Rose Lavelle	May 14, 1995 (aged 26)	68	18	(United States Soccer Federation) OL Reign
17	MF	Andi Sullivan	December 20, 1995 (aged 26)	22	2	(United States Soccer Federation) Washington Spirit
18	GK	Casey Murphy	April 25, 1996 (aged 25)	2	0	(United States Soccer Federation) North Carolina Courage
19	DF	Emily Fox	July 5, 1998 (aged 23)	8	0	(United States Soccer Federation) Racing Louisville
20	MF	Catarina Macario	October 4, 1999 (aged 22)	12	3	(French Football Federation) Lyon
21	GK	Aubrey Kingsbury	November 20, 1991 (aged 30)	0	0	(United States Soccer Federation) Washington Spirit
22	MF	Kristie Mewis	February 25, 1991 (aged 30)	33	4	(United States Soccer Federation) Gotham FC
23	FW	Margaret Purce	September 18, 1995 (aged 26)	9	2	(United States Soccer Federation) Gotham FC

== Player representation ==
=== By club ===
Clubs with 3 or more players represented are listed.

Players	Club
9	(Czech Republic) Sparta Prague
7	(Czech Republic) Slavia Prague, (United States) Washington Spirit
4	(Iceland) Breiðablik, (United States) Chicago Red Stars
3	(Germany) Bayern Munich, (Iceland) Valur, (United States) OL Reign, (United States) North Carolina Courage

=== By club nationality ===
Players	Clubs
28	United States
17	Czech Republic
9	Iceland
6	Australia, Germany
5	England, Sweden
4	Norway
3	France
2	Italy
1	New Zealand, Scotland, Spain

=== By club federation ===
Players	Federation
53	UEFA
28	CONCACAF
6	AFC
1	OFC

=== By representatives of domestic league ===
National squad	Players
United States	21
Czech Republic	17
Iceland	8
New Zealand	1
