= 2015 Cyprus Women's Cup =

Tournament details
- Host country: Cyprus
- Dates: 4–11 March
- Teams: 12 (from 4 confederations)
- Venues: 4 (in 3 host cities)

Final positions
- Champions: England (3rd title)
- Runners-up: Canada
- Third place: Mexico
- Fourth place: Italy

Tournament statistics
- Matches played: 24
- Goals scored: 60 (2.5 per match)
- Top scorer(s): (Scotland) Kim Little (5 goals)

The 2015 Cyprus Women's Cup was the eighth edition of the Cyprus Women's Cup, an invitational women's football tournament held annually in Cyprus. It took place from 4–11 March 2015.

== Venues ==
Stadium	City	Capacity
GSP Stadium	Nicosia	22,859
GSZ Stadium	Larnaca	13,032
Paralimni Stadium	Paralimni	5,800
Ammochostos Stadium	Larnaca	5,500

== Group stage ==
Teams were placed into three groups of four. New Zealand were originally drawn in Group C, but later withdrew and were replaced by South Africa.

=== Tie-breaking criteria ===
For the group stage of this tournament, where two or more teams in a group tied on an equal number of points, the finishing positions will be determined by the following tie-breaking criteria in the following order:

1. number of points obtained in the matches among the teams in question
2. goal difference in all the group matches
3. number of goals scored in all the group matches
4. drawing of lots

=== Group A ===
Team	Pld	W	D	L	GF	GA	GD	Pts
Canada	3	3	0	0	4	0	+4	9
Italy	3	2	0	1	5	4	+1	6
Scotland	3	1	0	2	4	6	−2	3
South Korea	3	0	0	3	2	5	−3	0

4 March 2015
14:30

South Korea	1–2	Italy
Ji So-yun 7'	Report	Bonansea 5'; Guagni 57'

GSP Stadium, Nicosia
4 March 2015
17:30

Scotland	0–2	Canada
	Report	Fleming 4'; Sinclair 55'

GSP Stadium, Nicosia

6 March 2015
14:30

Canada	1–0	South Korea
Sinclair 57'	Report

GSZ Stadium, Larnaca
6 March 2015
17:30

Italy	3–2	Scotland
Girelli 18', 67'; Tarenzi 55'	Report	Mitchell 69'; Little 80'

GSZ Stadium, Larnaca

9 March 2015
14:30

Italy	0–1	Canada
	Report	Chapman 50'

GSP Stadium, Nicosia
9 March 2015
14:30

Scotland	2–1	South Korea
Little 16' (pen.); Murray 89'	Report	Yeo Min-ji 34'

GSZ Stadium, Larnaca

=== Group B ===
Team	Pld	W	D	L	GF	GA	GD	Pts
England	3	2	1	0	7	2	+5	7
Australia	3	2	0	1	4	3	+1	6
Netherlands	3	0	2	1	1	2	−1	2
Finland	3	0	1	2	1	6	−5	1

4 March 2015
14:30

Finland	1–3	England
Saari 89' (pen.)	Report	Sanderson 21'; Aluko 66'; Clarke 83'

GSZ Stadium, Larnaca
4 March 2015
17:30

Netherlands	0–1	Australia
	Report	Crummer 73'

GSZ Stadium, Larnaca

6 March 2015
14:30

Finland	0–0	Netherlands
	Report

GSP Stadium, Nicosia
6 March 2015
17:30

Australia	0–3	England
	Report	Taylor 8', 17', 83'

GSP Stadium, Nicosia

9 March 2015
17:30

Netherlands	1–1	England
Miedema 19'	Report	Aluko 43'

GSP Stadium, Nicosia
9 March 2015
17:30

Australia	3–0	Finland
Gill 29'; Sykes 77'; Van Egmond 89'	report

GSZ Stadium, Larnaca

=== Group C ===
Team	Pld	W	D	L	GF	GA	GD	Pts
Mexico	3	2	1	0	3	0	+3	7
Czech Republic	3	1	1	1	3	3	0	4
South Africa	3	1	0	2	1	3	−2	3
Belgium	3	0	2	1	2	3	−1	2

4 March 2015
14:30

Mexico	2–0	South Africa
Corral 53'; Mayor 69'	Report

Paralimni Stadium, Paralimni
4 March 2015
17:30

Czech Republic	2–2	Belgium
Voňková 17'; I. Martínková 71'	Report	Daniels 53'; Wullaert 79'

Paralimni Stadium, Paralimni

6 March 2015
14:30

Belgium	0–1	South Africa
	Report	Seoposenwe 21'

Paralimni Stadium, Paralimni
6 March 2015
17:30

Czech Republic	0–1	Mexico
	Report	Noyola 63'

Paralimni Stadium, Paralimni

9 March 2015
14:30

South Africa	0–1	Czech Republic
	Report	Chlastáková 67'

Paralimni Stadium, Paralimni
9 March 2015
17:30

Mexico	0–0	Belgium
	Report

Paralimni Stadium, Paralimni

== Knockout stage ==
=== Eleventh place match ===
11 March 2015
11:00

South Korea	1–1	Belgium
Yoo Young-a 67'	Report	Daniëls 49'
Penalties
	5–3

Paralimni Stadium, Paralimni

=== Ninth place match ===
11 March 2015
12:00

Finland	2–1	South Africa
Kempi 7'; Westerlund 30'	Report	Seoposenwe 63'

GSP Stadium, Nicosia

=== Seventh place match ===
11 March 2015
13:00

Scotland	3–1	Netherlands
Little 17', 55', 90+1'	Report	Hoogendijk 70'

Ammochostos Stadium, Larnaca

=== Fifth place match ===
11 March 2015
14:00

Australia	6–2	Czech Republic
Gorry 8'; Van Egmond 15'; De Vanna 34'; Heyman 54'; Polkinghorne 85'; Sykes 86'	Report	Benýrová 8', 63'

Paralimni Stadium, Paralimni

=== Third place match ===
11 March 2015
14:00

Italy	2–3	Mexico
Cernoia 53'; Guagni 69'	Report	Corral 45'; Franco 86'; Pérez 87'

GSZ Stadium, Larnaca

=== Final ===
11 March 2015
18:30

Canada	0–1	England
	Report	Sanderson 67'

GSZ Stadium, Larnaca

== Final standings ==
Rank	Team
1st place, gold medalist(s)	England
2nd place, silver medalist(s)	Canada
3rd place, bronze medalist(s)	Mexico
4	Italy
5	Australia
6	Czech Republic
7	Scotland
8	Netherlands
9	Finland
10	South Africa
11	South Korea
12	Belgium

== Goalscorers ==
5 goals

- (Scotland) Kim Little

3 goals

- (England) Jodie Taylor

2 goals

- (Australia) Ashleigh Sykes
- (Australia) Emily van Egmond
- (Belgium) Yana Daniels
- (Canada) Christine Sinclair
- (England) Eniola Aluko
- (England) Lianne Sanderson
- (Italy) Cristiana Girelli
- (Italy) Alia Guagni
- (Mexico) Charlyn Corral
- (South Africa) Jermaine Seoposenwe

1 goal

- (Australia) Larissa Crummer
- (Australia) Lisa De Vanna
- (Australia) Kathryn Gill
- (Australia) Katrina Gorry
- (Australia) Michelle Heyman
- (Australia) Clare Polkinghorne
- (Belgium) Tessa Wullaert
- (Canada) Candace Chapman
- (Canada) Jessie Fleming
- (Czech Republic) Pavla Benýrová
- (Czech Republic) Jitka Chlastáková
- (Czech Republic) Irena Martínková
- (Czech Republic) Lucie Voňková
- (England) Jessica Clarke
- (Finland) Juliette Kemppi
- (Finland) Maija Saari
- (Finland) Anna Westerlund
- (Italy) Barbara Bonansea
- (Italy) Valentina Cernoia
- (Italy) Stefania Tarenzi
- (South Korea) Ji So-yun
- (South Korea) Yeo Min-ji
- (South Korea) Yoo Young-a
- (Mexico) Yamile Franco
- (Mexico) Stephany Mayor
- (Mexico) Teresa Noyola
- (Mexico) Verónica Pérez
- (Netherlands) Anouk Hoogendijk
- (Netherlands) Vivianne Miedema
- (Scotland) Emma Mitchell
- (Scotland) Christie Murray
