= Kateřina Bužková =

Czech footballer

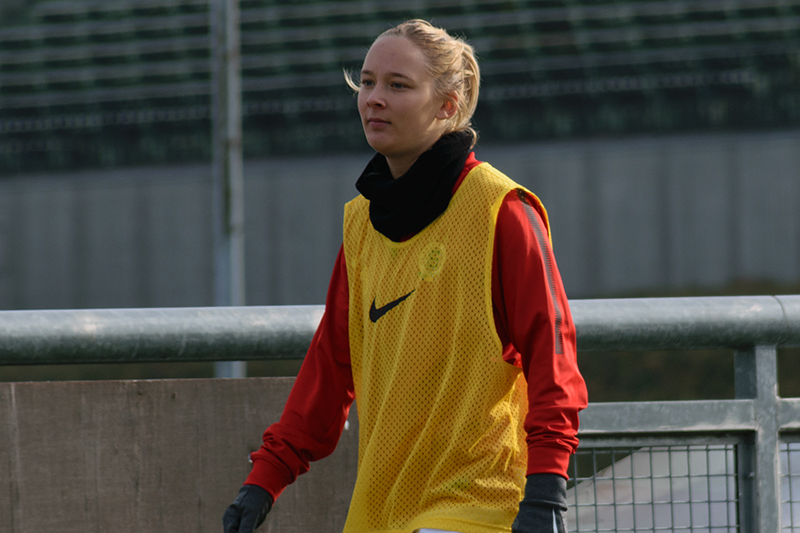

Personal information
- Full name: Kateřina Bužková
- Date of birth: 19 March 1996 (age 30)
- Place of birth: Zlín, Czech Republic
- Height: 1.66 m (5 ft 5 in)
- Position: Midfielder

Youth career
- Zlín
- ?–2011: Slovácko
- 2011–2014: Sparta Prague

Senior career*
Years	Team	Apps	(Gls)
2014–2024	Sparta Prague	127	(36)
2022–2023	→ Slovan Liberec (loan)	17	(3)

International career^{‡}
2015–2024	Czech Republic	24	(0)
- * Club domestic league appearances and goals as of 21 May 2024 ‡ National team caps and goals as of 21 May 2024

Kateřina Bužková (born 19 March 1996) is a Czech former football midfielder, who played for Sparta Prague in the Czech Women's First League.

She was a member of the Czech national team.
