= Veronika Hoferková =

Czech footballer

Personal information
- Full name: Veronika Hoferková
- Date of birth: 20 January 1982 (age 44)
- Place of birth: Uherské Hradiště
- Height: 1.62 m (5 ft 4 in)
- Position: Midfielder

Senior career*
Years	Team	Apps	(Gls)
1996–2008	Slovácko		
2009–2012	Kenty		

International career^{‡}
2003–	Czech Republic	34	(1)
- * Club domestic league appearances and goals ‡ National team caps and goals as of 31 October 2013

Veronika Hoferková is a former Czech football midfielder, who played for BK Kenty in Sweden's Division 1. She previously played for 1. FC Slovácko in the Czech First Division.

She was a member of the Czech national team.
