= Gabriela Šlajsová =

Czech footballer (born 2000)

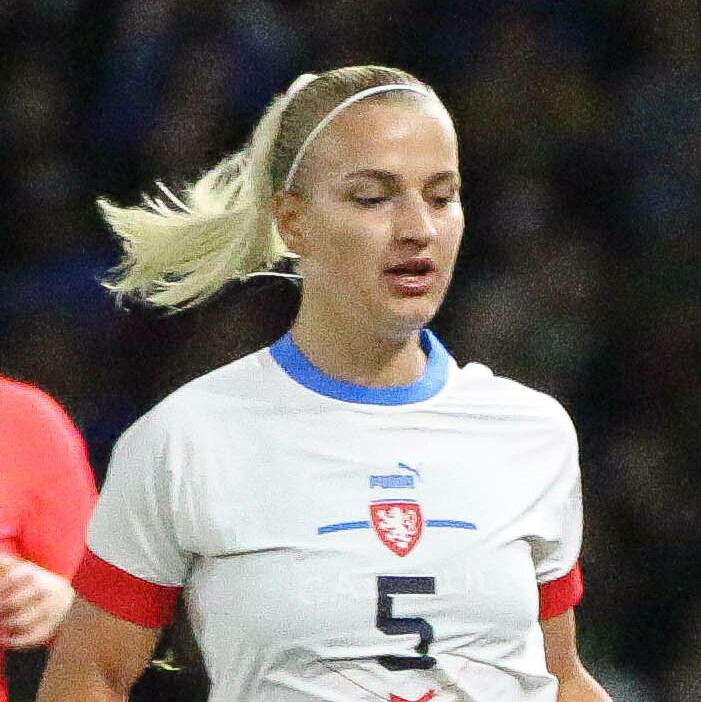
- Gabriela Šlajsová Czech in 2022

Personal information
- Date of birth: 7 April 2000 (age 26)
- Place of birth: Spálené Poříčí, Czech Republic
- Position: Defender

Senior career*
| Years | Team | Apps | (Gls) |
| –2020 | Viktoria Plzeň | | |
| 2020–2025 | Slavia Prague | | |

International career^{‡}
| 2020–2025 | Czech Republic | 25 | (0) |
- * Club domestic league appearances and goals ‡ National team caps and goals as of 19 June 2023

Gabriela Šlajsová (born 7 April 2000) is a Czech footballer who played as a defender for Slavia Prague.

== Early life ==
Šlajsová started playing football at the age of six. She is a native of Spálené Poříčí, Czech Republic.

== Club career ==
Šlajsová started her career with Czech side Viktoria Plzeň. In 2020, Šlajsová signed for Czech side Slavia Prague.

In January 2025, Šlajsová took a break from her career for health reasons.

== Club career ==
Šlajsová has played for the Czech Republic women's national football team.

== Personal life ==
Šlajsová has been in a relationship with Czech footballer Václav Sejk. On 18 September 2025, she gave a birth to their daughter Claudia.
