= Eliška Sonntagová =

Czech footballer

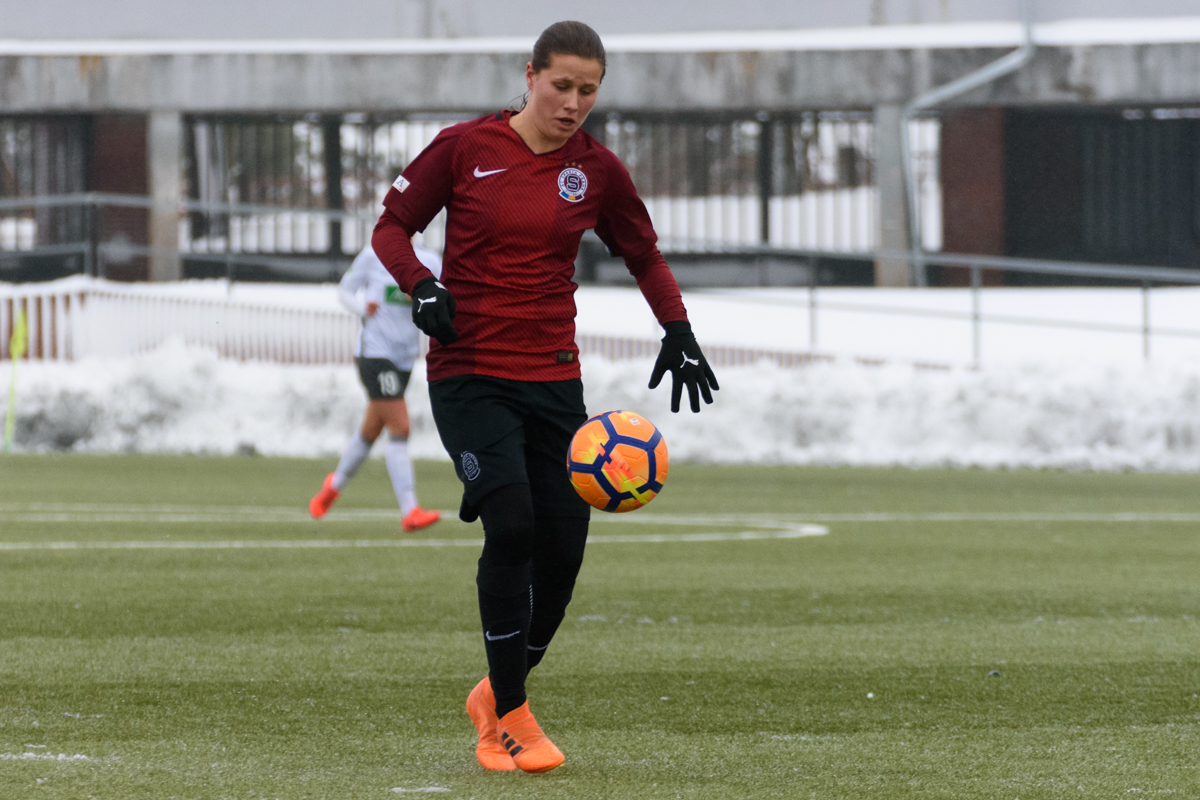

Personal information
- Date of birth: 26 July 2001 (age 25)
- Place of birth: Liberec, Czech Republic
- Position: Midfielder

Team information
- Current team: Sparta Prague
- Number: 12

Youth career
- Liberec
- Sparta Prague

Senior career*
| Years | Team | Apps | (Gls) |
| 2018– | Sparta Prague | 100 | (29) |

International career^{‡}
| 2019– | Czech Republic | 42 | (2) |
- * Club domestic league appearances and goals as of 18:59, 22 August 2025 (UTC) ‡ National team caps and goals as of 22 August 2025

Eliška Sonntagová (born 26 July 2001) is a Czech footballer who plays as a midfielder for Sparta Prague and has appeared for the Czech Republic women's national team.

Sonntagová was voted talent of the year at the 2019 Czech Footballer of the Year (women).

On 11 September 2025, Sonntagová signed a new contract with Sparta Prague.

On 21 April 2026, Sonntagová signed a new multi-year contract with Sparta Prague.

== Career ==
Sonntagová has been capped for the Czech Republic national team, appearing for the team during the UEFA Women's Euro 2021 qualifying cycle.

== International goals ==
| No. | Date | Venue | Opponent | Score | Result | Competition |
|---|---|---|---|---|---|---|
| 1. | 9 April 2024 | Estadio El Plantío, Burgos, Spain | Spain | 1–0 | 1–3 | UEFA Women's Euro 2025 qualifying |
