= Kateřina Kotrčová =

Czech footballer

Personal information
- Date of birth: 27 April 2000 (age 26)
- Place of birth: Czech Republic
- Positions: Midfielder; defender

Team information
- Current team: Pogoń Szczecin
- Number: 5

Youth career
- 2006–2013: Sokol Stodůlky
- 2013–2018: Sparta Prague

Senior career*
Years	Team	Apps	(Gls)
2018–2026	Sparta Prague	92	(17)
2018–2019	→ Viktoria Plzeň (loan)	17	(1)
2026–	Pogoń Szczecin	0	(0)

International career^{‡}
2022–	Czech Republic	29	(1)
- * Club domestic league appearances and goals as of 13:33, 10 July 2026 (UTC) ‡ National team caps and goals as of 13:33, 10 July 2026 (UTC)

Kateřina Kotrčová (born 27 April 2000) is a Czech professional footballer who plays as a midfielder for Ekstraliga club Pogoń Szczecin and the Czech Republic national team.

== Club career ==
Kotrčová joined in her first season to Viktoria Plzeň on a one-year loan deal.

On 13 August 2024, Kotrčová signed a new contract with Sparta Prague.

On 10 September 2025, Kotrčová signed a new contract.

On 10 July 2026, Kotrčová signed a two-year contract with Ekstraliga club Pogoń Szczecin.

== International career ==
She is a member of the Czech national team. She made her debut for the national team on 21 February 2022 in a match against Iceland.

== Career statistics ==
=== International ===
Scores and results list Czech Republic's goal tally first, score column indicates score after each Kotrčová goal.

List of international goals scored by Kateřina Kotrčová
No.	Date	Venue	Opponent	Score	Result	Competition
1	26 September 2023	Gradski stadion, Velika Gorica, Croatia	Belarus	1–0	2–1	2023–24 UEFA Women's Nations League
