= Nikola Danihelková =

Czech footballer

Personal information
- Full name: Nikola Danihelková
- Date of birth: 26 July 1994 (age 32)
- Place of birth: Hradec Králové, Czech Republic
- Height: 1.73 m (5 ft 8 in)
- Positions: Striker; midfielder

Youth career
- Hradec Králové
- Sparta Prague

Senior career*
Years	Team	Apps	(Gls)
2010–2017	Sparta Prague		
2014–2015	→ Pardubice (loan)		
2015–2017	→ Hradec Králové (loan)		
2017–	Hradec Králové		

International career^{‡}
2012–2013	Czech Republic	7	(2)
- * Club domestic league appearances and goals ‡ National team caps and goals as of 22 March 2020

Nikola Danihelková (born 26 July 1994) is a Czech football striker, currently playing for Hradec Králové in the Czech Women's First League.

Danihelková was voted talent of the year at the 2010 Czech Footballer of the Year (women).

She was a member of the Czech national team. She made her debut for the national team on 16 June 2012 in a match against Austria.
