= Klára Cvrčková =

Czech footballer

Personal information
- Date of birth: 25 July 2001 (age 25)
- Place of birth: Prague, Czech Republic
- Position: Striker

Team information
- Current team: Slavia Prague
- Number: 6

Youth career
- Zličín
- 2014–2020: Sparta Prague

Senior career*
Years	Team	Apps	(Gls)
2020–2024	Sparta Prague		
2024–	Slavia Prague		

International career^{‡}
2021–	Czech Republic	13	(1)
- * Club domestic league appearances and goals as of 21 September 2021 ‡ National team caps and goals as of 27 May 2024

Klára Cvrčková (born 25 July 2001) is a Czech footballer who plays as a striker for Slavia Prague.

She is a member of the Czech national team. She made her debut for the national team on 21 September 2021 in a match against Cyprus.

== International goals ==
No.	Date	Venue	Opponent	Score	Result	Competition
1.	21 September 2021	Stadion u Nisy, Liberec, Czech Republic	Cyprus	8–0	8–0	2023 FIFA Women's World Cup qualification
