= Barbora Růžičková =

Czech footballer

Personal information
- Date of birth: 20 April 1998 (age 28)
- Position: Goalkeeper

Team information
- Current team: Baník Ostrava
- Number: 1

Senior career*
Years	Team	Apps	(Gls)
–2025	Slovácko		
2025–	Baník Ostrava	1	(0)

International career^{‡}
2018–	Czech Republic	6	(0)
- * Club domestic league appearances and goals as of 11:41, 19 August 2025 (UTC) ‡ National team caps and goals as of 23:49, 31 August 2019 (UTC)

Barbora Růžičková (born 20 April 1998) is a Czech footballer who plays as a goalkeeper for Baník Ostrava and has appeared for the Czech Republic women's national team.

== Career ==
In August 2025, Růžičková signed a contract with Baník Ostrava.

Růžičková has been capped for the Czech Republic national team, appearing for the team during the UEFA Women's Euro 2021 qualifying cycle.
