= Dagmar Urbancová =

Czech footballer (born 1983)

Personal information
- Full name: Dagmar Urbancová
- Date of birth: 23 May 1983 (age 43)
- Place of birth: Uherské Hradiště, Czechoslovakia
- Height: 1.71 m (5 ft 7 in)
- Position: Defender

Senior career*
Years	Team	Apps	(Gls)
1997–2002	Compex Otrokovice		
2002–2007	Bayern Munich	40	(0)

International career
2000–2005	Czech Republic	27	(4)
- * Club domestic league appearances and goals

Dagmar Urbancová (born 23 May 1983) is a former Czech football defender. She played for DFC Compex Otrokovice in the Czech First Division and Bayern Munich in the German Bundesliga.

She was a member of the Czech national team.
