= Pavlína Ščasná =

Czech footballer

Personal information
- Full name: Pavlína Ščasná
- Date of birth: 3 April 1982 (age 44)
- Place of birth: Roudnice nad Labem, Czechoslovakia
- Height: 1.65 m (5 ft 5 in)
- Position: Striker

Senior career*
Years	Team	Apps	(Gls)
1997–2001	Sparta Prague		
2001–2002	Bayern Munich	30	(18)
2003	Philadelphia Charge	2	(0)
2004–2006	Bayern Munich	53	(27)
2006–2007	KIF Örebro DFF		(7)
2008–2010	LdB Malmö	56	(18)

International career
1998–2001	Czech Republic U19	16	(9)
1998–2008	Czech Republic	51	(24)
- * Club domestic league appearances and goals

Pavlína Ščasná (born 3 April 1982) is a Czech former football striker who last played for Swedish champion LdB Malmö.

== Career ==
She played four years in Sparta Prague before earning Bayern Munich attention. In her first season at Bayern she was the team's top scorer with 14 goals. At the age of 20 she moved to WUSA's Philadelphia Charge, becoming the first Czech player of women's football in the United States. The WUSA folded in September 2003, so Ščasná returned to Bayern. She played a few more seasons in the Bundesliga before moving to Damallsvenskan in 2006. She spent two years in KIF Örebro DFF and then signed for LdB Malmö, with which she won the 2010 league, her first national title since she left the Czech league. She was drafted by Atlanta Beat in the 2010 WPS Dispersal Draft, but she decided to remain in Malmö. After knee injury in March 2011 she ended with football.

She was an international player for a decade, scoring 24 goals in 50 games for the Czech national team. She retired from international football in Autumn 2008. She was named Czech Footballer of the Year (women) five times, in 1998, 2004, 2006, 2007 and 2008.

== Personal life ==
Ščasná is the daughter of manager and former international player Zdeněk Ščasný. She began playing football in the junior teams of her father's last two teams as a player, Anagennisi Dherynia in Cyprus and SK Roudnice nad Labem. Her brother Michal is also a professional footballer. In August 2011, Ščasná married footballer Rostislav Novák at the Vrtba Garden in Prague.

== Honours ==
=== Club ===
Sparta Prague

- I. liga žen: 1997–98, 1998–99, 1999–00, 2000–01

LdB Malmö / FC Rosengård

- Damallsvenskan: 2010

=== Individual ===
- Czech Women Footballer of the Year: 1998, 2004, 2006, 2007, 2008
