= Adéla Pivoňková =

Czech footballer

Personal information
- Full name: Adéla Pivoňková
- Date of birth: 28 September 1991 (age 35)
- Place of birth: Jilemnice, Czechoslovakia
- Height: 1.70 m (5 ft 7 in)
- Position: Midfielder

Youth career
- Sokol Železnice

Senior career*
Years	Team	Apps	(Gls)
- Sparta Prague

International career^{‡}
2008–2014	Czech Republic	27	(10)
- * Club domestic league appearances and goals ‡ National team caps and goals as of 13 February 2014

Adéla Pivoňková (born 28 September 1991) is a former Czech football midfielder, who played for Sparta Prague in the Czech Women's First League.

She was a member of the Czech national team. She made her debut for the national team on 26 June 2008 in a match against Belarus.

Pivoňková was voted talent of the year at the 2007 Czech Footballer of the Year (women).
