= Petra Divišová =

Czech soccer player

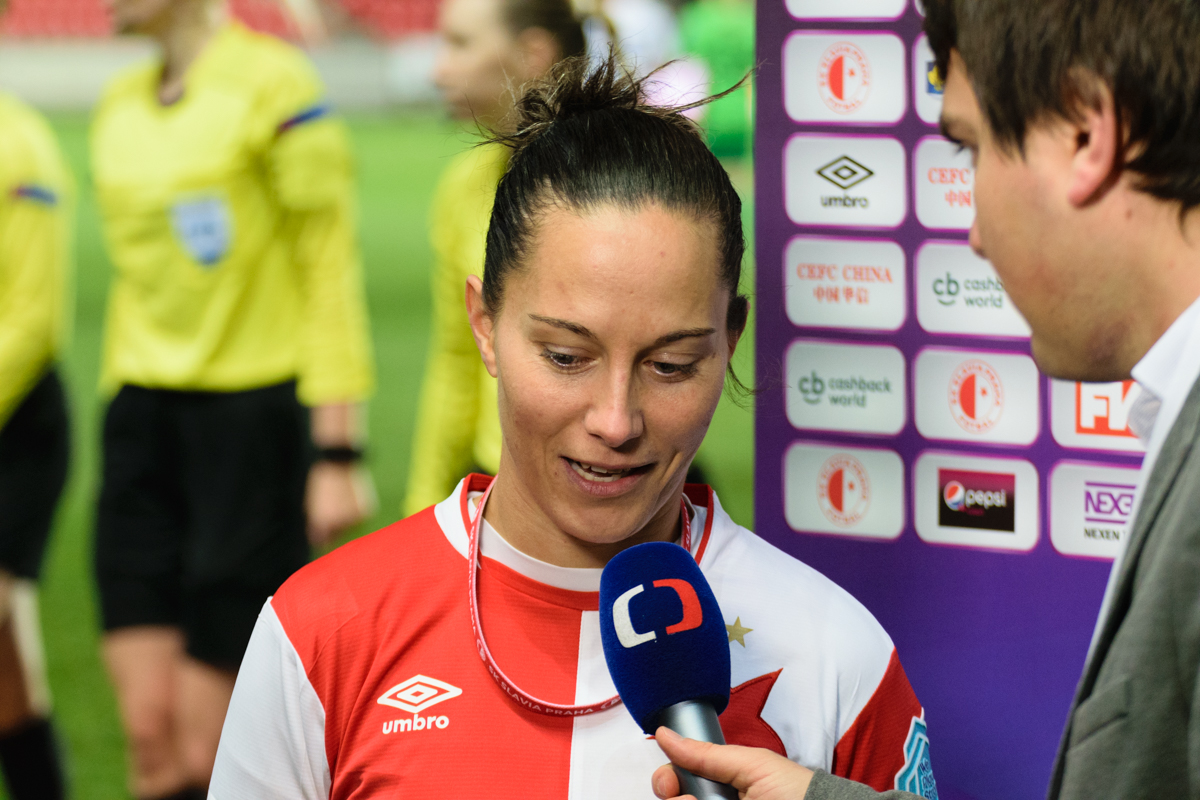
- Divišová in 2018

Personal information
- Full name: Petra Divišová
- Date of birth: 5 June 1984 (age 42)
- Place of birth: Strakonice, Czechoslovakia
- Height: 1.59 m (5 ft 3 in)
- Position: Striker

Team information
- Current team: ABC Braník
- Number: 23

Senior career*
Years	Team	Apps	(Gls)
2000–2004	TJ Blatná		
2004–2006	Gera 03		
2006	TJ Blatná		
2007–2025	Slavia Prague	319	(276)
2026	FC Prague		
2026–	ABC Braník		

International career^{‡}
2007–2019	Czech Republic	58	(18)
- * Club domestic league appearances and goals ‡ National team caps and goals as of 16 November 2025

Petra Divišová (born 5 June 1984), is a Czech football striker, who plays for ABC Braník in the Czech Women's Second League. She was a member of the Czech national team.

== Career ==
After starting her career in TJ Blatná, in 2004 she moved to 1. FC Gera in the German Regionalliga. In April 2007 she made her debut with the Czech national team in a friendly against Switzerland, and that year she signed for Slavia Prague, where she has played for over a decade. There she first played the UEFA Champions League, reaching the quarterfinals.

In 2026, Divišová joined FC Prague.

Goals for the Czech WNT in official competitions
Competition	Stage	Date	Location	Opponent	Goals	Result	Overall
2011 FIFA World Cup	Qualifiers	2010–03–27	Baku	Azerbaijan	1	5–0	6
2011 FIFA World Cup	Qualifiers	2010–04–01	Brussels	Belgium	3	3–0	6
2011 FIFA World Cup	Qualifiers	2010–08–25	Prague	Azerbaijan	2	8–0	6
2013 UEFA Euro	Qualifiers	2011–10–22	Písek	Portugal	1	1–0	3
2013 UEFA Euro	Qualifiers	2012–03–31	Tondela	Portugal	1	5–2	3
2013 UEFA Euro	Qualifiers	2012–06–16	Prague	Austria	1	2–3	3
2015 FIFA World Cup	Qualifiers	2013–10–26	Strumica	North Macedonia	1	3–1	2
2015 FIFA World Cup	Qualifiers	2014–02–13	Novara	Italy	1	1–6	2
2019 FIFA World Cup	Qualifiers	2017–09–14	Tórshavn	Faroe Islands	1	8–0	TBD
2019 FIFA World Cup	Qualifiers	2017–10–20	Domžale	Slovenia	2	4–0	TBD

== Personal life ==
She is from the village of Radošovice near Strakonice. Because the Czech league is not professional, Divišová worked in a rehabilitation centre.

As of 27 April 2022, Divišová has a girlfriend with whom she is raising her daughter.
