= Blanka Pěničková =

Czech footballer

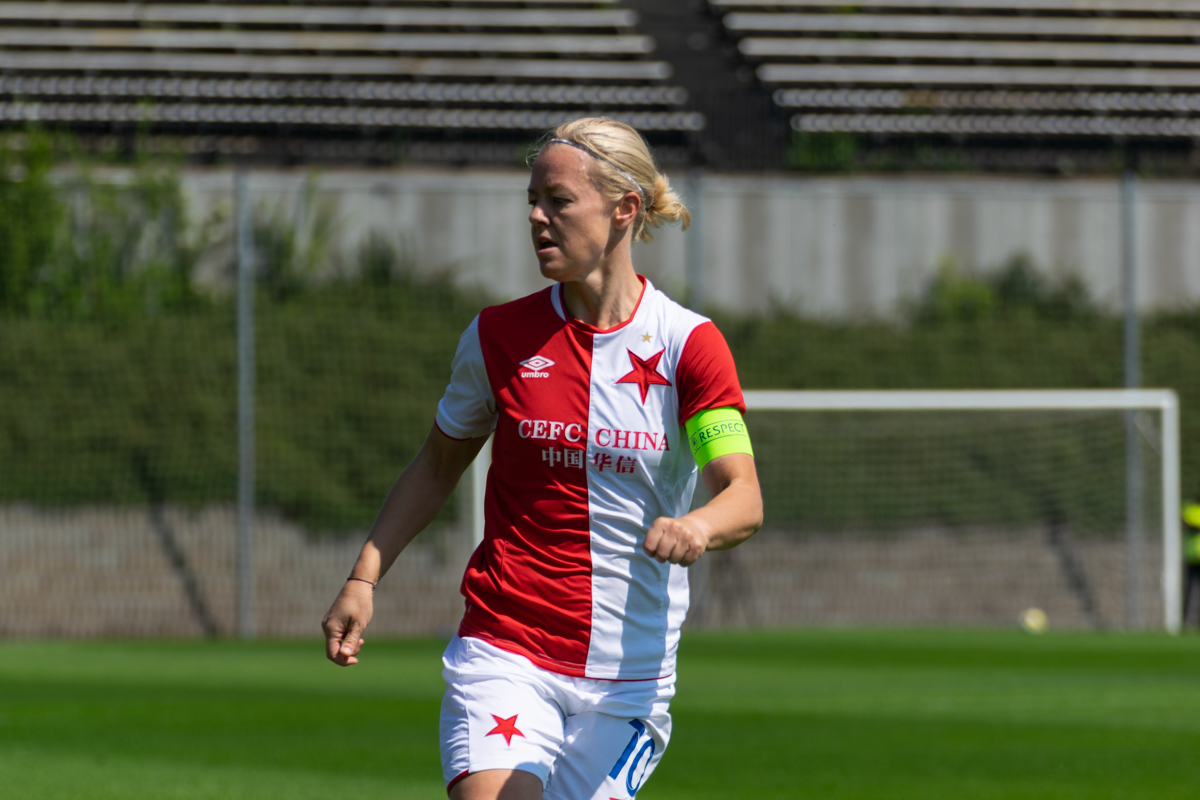

Personal information
- Date of birth: 11 April 1980 (age 46)
- Place of birth: Jablonec nad Nisou, Czechoslovakia
- Height: 1.63 m (5 ft 4 in)
- Positions: Midfielder; striker

Team information
- Current team: Slavia Prague (assistant coach)

Senior career*
Years	Team	Apps	(Gls)
1994–1998	Jablonec		
1998–2019	Slavia Prague		(+114)
2005–2006	→ Tavagnacco		(4)

International career
1999–2008	Czech Republic	43	(7)
- * Club domestic league appearances and goals

Blanka Pěničková is a former Czech football midfielder, currently assistant coach for Slavia Prague in the Czech First Division. She has also played in Italy's Serie A for UPC Tavagnacco.

She played for the Czech national team. She made her debut on 25 April 1999 in a match against Austria.

== Titles ==
- 5 Czech League (2003, 2014, 2015, 2016, 2017)
