= Gabriela Chlumecká =

Czech footballer

Personal information
- Full name: Gabriela Chlumecká
- Date of birth: 24 April 1975 (age 51)
- Place of birth: Kladno, Czechoslovakia
- Position: Striker

Senior career*
Years	Team	Apps	(Gls)
1990-2003	Sparta Prague	46+	(64+)
2003–2007	Slavia Prague	69	(81)

International career
1990–1992	Czechoslovakia		
1993–2007	Czech Republic	66	(52)
- * Club domestic league appearances and goals

Gabriela Chlumecká is a Czech former football striker. She played for Sparta Prague, 1. FC Nürnberg and Slavia Prague, taking part in the UEFA Women's Cup with both Czech teams.

She was an international for 17 years, representing both Czechoslovakia and the Czech Republic. She is the latter's top scorer with 52 goals in 66 appearances.

== International goals ==
No.	Date	Venue	Opponent	Score	Result	Competition
1.	21 June 1993	Hluk, Czech Republic	Slovakia	1–0	6–0	Friendly
2.	21 June 1993	Hluk, Czech Republic	Slovakia	3–0	6–0	Friendly
3.	22 June 1993	Hluk, Czech Republic	Slovakia	3–0	3–1	Friendly
4.	10 September 1994	Kecskemét, Hungary	Hungary	0–1	4–4	UEFA Women's Euro 1995 qualifying
5.	10 September 1994	Kecskemét, Hungary	Hungary	4–4	4–4	UEFA Women's Euro 1995 qualifying
6.	17 September 1995	Příbram, Czech Republic	Estonia	1–0	11–0	UEFA Women's Euro 1997 qualifying
7.	17 September 1995	Příbram, Czech Republic	Estonia	2–0	11–0	UEFA Women's Euro 1997 qualifying
8.	17 September 1995	Příbram, Czech Republic	Estonia	4–0	11–0	UEFA Women's Euro 1997 qualifying
9.	17 September 1995	Příbram, Czech Republic	Estonia	7–0	11–0	UEFA Women's Euro 1997 qualifying
10.	17 September 1995	Příbram, Czech Republic	Estonia	9–0	11–0	UEFA Women's Euro 1997 qualifying
11.	17 September 1995	Příbram, Czech Republic	Estonia	10–0	11–0	UEFA Women's Euro 1997 qualifying
12.	7 October 1995	Mogilev, Belarus	Belarus	0–1	0–1	UEFA Women's Euro 1997 qualifying
13.	25 May 1996	Tallinn, Estonia	Estonia	0–1	0–7	UEFA Women's Euro 1997 qualifying
14.	25 May 1996	Tallinn, Estonia	Estonia	0–3	0–7	UEFA Women's Euro 1997 qualifying
15.	25 May 1996	Tallinn, Estonia	Estonia	0–4	0–7	UEFA Women's Euro 1997 qualifying
16.	25 August 1996	Lázně Bohdaneč, Czech Republic	Poland	3–0	6–2	UEFA Women's Euro 1997 qualifying
17.	25 August 1996	Lázně Bohdaneč, Czech Republic	Poland	4–1	6–2	UEFA Women's Euro 1997 qualifying
18.	25 August 1996	Lázně Bohdaneč, Czech Republic	Poland	5–1	6–2	UEFA Women's Euro 1997 qualifying
19.	7 October 1997	Tallinn, Estonia	Estonia	0–5	0–8	1999 FIFA Women's World Cup qualification
20.	10 October 1997	Vilnius, Lithuania	Lithuania	0–2	0–12	1999 FIFA Women's World Cup qualification
21.	10 October 1997	Vilnius, Lithuania	Lithuania	0–3	0–12	1999 FIFA Women's World Cup qualification
22.	10 October 1997	Vilnius, Lithuania	Lithuania	0–4	0–12	1999 FIFA Women's World Cup qualification
23.	10 October 1997	Vilnius, Lithuania	Lithuania	0–5	0–12	1999 FIFA Women's World Cup qualification
24.	10 October 1997	Vilnius, Lithuania	Lithuania	0–7	0–12	1999 FIFA Women's World Cup qualification
25.	10 October 1997	Vilnius, Lithuania	Lithuania	0–11	0–12	1999 FIFA Women's World Cup qualification
26.	16 May 1998	Sedlčany, Czech Republic	Lithuania	1–0	9–0	1999 FIFA Women's World Cup qualification
27.	16 May 1998	Sedlčany, Czech Republic	Lithuania	6–0	9–0	1999 FIFA Women's World Cup qualification
28.	25 April 1999	Blšany, Czech Republic	Austria	1–0	5–0	Friendly
29.	25 April 1999	Blšany, Czech Republic	Austria	3–0	5–0	Friendly
30.	14 November 1999	Cumbernauld, Scotland	Scotland	0–1	2–1	UEFA Women's Euro 2001 qualifying
31.	28 May 2000	Arklow, Ireland	Republic of Ireland	0–1	0–4	UEFA Women's Euro 2001 qualifying
32.	1 July 2000	Vranovice, Czech Republic	Croatia	1–0	5–0	UEFA Women's Euro 2001 qualifying
33.	26 August 2000	Blšany, Czech Republic	Scotland	1–1	5–1	UEFA Women's Euro 2001 qualifying
34.	26 August 2000	Blšany, Czech Republic	Scotland	2–1	5–1	UEFA Women's Euro 2001 qualifying
35.	10 March 2001	Grevena, Greece	Greece	0–2	5–1	Friendly
36.	17 November 2001	Drnovice, Czech Republic	France	1–2	1–2	2003 FIFA Women's World Cup qualification
37.	26 May 2002	Blšany, Czech Republic	Ukraine	1–0	2–3	2003 FIFA Women's World Cup qualification
38.	19 April 2003	Prague, Czech Republic	Finland	1–0	2–1	Friendly
39.	8 August 2003	Bzenec, Czech Republic	Slovakia	2–1	2–2	Friendly
40.	9 August 2003	Nemšová, Slovakia	Slovakia	1–1	2–2	Friendly
41.	4 February 2005	Dubai, United Arab Emirates	Romania	0–1	0–4	Friendly
42.	4 February 2005	Dubai, United Arab Emirates	Romania	0–3	0–4	Friendly
43.	4 February 2005	Dubai, United Arab Emirates	Romania	0–4	0–4	Friendly
44.	6 February 2005	Dubai, United Arab Emirates	United Arab Emirates	0–2	0–5	Friendly
45.	26 May 2005	Walsall, England	England	?–1	4–1	Friendly
46.	5 November 2005	Lisbon, Portugal	Portugal	0–2	0–3	2007 FIFA Women's World Cup qualification
47.	4 June 2006	Roudnice nad Labem, Czech Republic	Portugal	5–0	6–0	2007 FIFA Women's World Cup qualification
48.	27 August 2006	Čelákovice, Czech Republic	Belarus	2–0	3–0	2007 FIFA Women's World Cup qualification
49.	6 May 2007	Rønne, Denmark	Denmark	2–1	4–1	Friendly
50.	26 May 2007	Coleraine, Northern Ireland	Northern Ireland	1–1	1–3	UEFA Women's Euro 2009 qualifying
51.	26 May 2007	Coleraine, Northern Ireland	Northern Ireland	1–2	1–3	UEFA Women's Euro 2009 qualifying
52.	26 May 2007	Coleraine, Northern Ireland	Northern Ireland	1–3	1–3	UEFA Women's Euro 2009 qualifying

== Honours ==
Sparta Prague

Winners (1) Czechoslovak women's football championship: 1990/91

Winners (9) Czech Women's First League: 1993 - 2002

Slavia Prague

Winners (1) Czech Women's First League: 2003/04
