= Kateřina Došková =

Czech footballer

Personal information
- Full name: Kateřina Došková
- Date of birth: 20 February 1982 (age 44)
- Place of birth: Karlovy Vary, Czechoslovakia
- Height: 1.60 m (5 ft 3 in)
- Position: Striker

Youth career
- DDM Stará Role
- 1996: Rapid Plzeň

Senior career*
Years	Team	Apps	(Gls)
1999–2010	Sparta Prague		

International career
1999–2010	Czech Republic	62	(9)
- * Club domestic league appearances and goals

Kateřina Došková (born 20 February 1982) is a Czech former football striker who played for most of her career for Sparta Prague in the Czech 1st Division and the Champions League.

She was a member of the Czech national team for over a decade.

Došková was voted Czech Footballer of the Year (women) at the 2002.
