= Kateřina Svitková =

Czech footballer (born 1996)

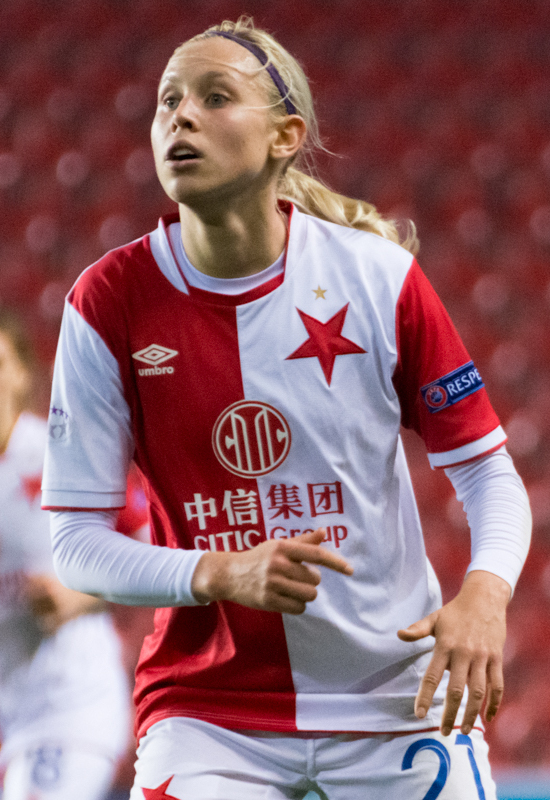
- Svitková with Slavia Prague in 2018

Personal information
- Date of birth: 20 March 1996 (age 30)
- Place of birth: Plzeň, Czech Republic
- Height: 1.66 m (5 ft 5 in)
- Position: Midfielder

Team information
- Current team: Slavia Prague
- Number: 21

Youth career
- 2003–2013: Viktoria Plzeň

Senior career*
Years	Team	Apps	(Gls)
2013–2020	Slavia Prague	177	(188)
2020–2022	West Ham United	34	(5)
2022–2024	Chelsea	3	(0)
2024	→ Slavia Prague (loan)	5	(1)
2024–	Slavia Prague	14	(23)

International career^{‡}
2011–2013	Czech Republic U17	21	(15)
2013–2014	Czech Republic U19	12	(6)
2014–	Czech Republic	70	(35)
- * Club domestic league appearances and goals as of 30 May 2025 ‡ National team caps and goals as of 30 May 2025

Kateřina Svitková (born 20 March 1996) is a Czech professional footballer who plays as a midfielder for Slavia Prague and the Czech Republic national team. She previously played for West Ham United and Chelsea.

== Early life ==
Svitková was born in Plzeň and played with the boys' teams at Viktoria Plzeň.

== Club career ==
Svitková was along Kirsten van de Ven the top assister of the 2015–16 UEFA Women's Champions League, where Slavia reached the quarterfinals. Svitková was named 2015, 2018, 2019 and 2020 Czech Footballer of the Year (women). In the 2016–17 and 2017–18 season she was the top scorer of the Czech Women's First League.

== International career ==
Svitková made her debut for the Czech national team in a February 2014 FIFA World Cup qualifying 6–1 loss against Italy, and went on to lead the team's scoring in those qualifiers with 5 goals.

== Career statistics ==
Scores and results list the Czech Republic's goal tally first, score column indicates score after each Svitková goal.

List of international goals scored by Kateřina Svitková
No.	Date	Venue	Opponent	Score	Result	Competition
1	26 April 2014	Stadion v Městských sadech, Opava, Czech Republic	Estonia	4–0	6–0	2015 FIFA Women's World Cup qualification
2	26 April 2014	Stadion v Městských sadech, Opava, Czech Republic	Estonia	6–0	6–0	2015 FIFA Women's World Cup qualification
3	20 August 2014	A. Le Coq Arena, Tallinn, Estonia	Estonia	1–0	4–1	2015 FIFA Women's World Cup qualification
4	20 August 2014	A. Le Coq Arena, Tallinn, Estonia	Estonia	2–0	4–1	2015 FIFA Women's World Cup qualification
5	20 August 2014	A. Le Coq Arena, Tallinn, Estonia	Estonia	3–0	4–1	2015 FIFA Women's World Cup qualification
6	1 December 2015	Stade de la Maladière, Neuchâtel, Switzerland	Switzerland	1–4	1–5	UEFA Women's Euro 2017 qualifying
7	8 March 2017	GSZ Stadium, Larnaca, Cyprus	Italy	2–5	2–6	2017 Cyprus Women's Cup
8	14 September 2017	Tórsvøllur, Tórshavn, Faroe Islands	Faroe Islands	1–0	8–0	2019 FIFA Women's World Cup qualification
9	14 September 2017	Tórsvøllur, Tórshavn, Faroe Islands	Faroe Islands	6–0	8–0	2019 FIFA Women's World Cup qualification
10	28 February 2018	GSZ Stadium, Larnaca, Cyprus	Belgium	1–0	2–1	2018 Cyprus Women's Cup
11	7 March 2018	GSZ Stadium, Larnaca, Cyprus	Slovakia	5–2	5–2	2018 Cyprus Women's Cup
12	12 June 2018	Letní stadion, Chomutov, Czech Republic	Faroe Islands	1–0	4–1	2019 FIFA Women's World Cup qualification
13	31 August 2018	Stadion Střelnice, Jablonec nad Nisou, Czech Republic	Slovenia	1–0	2–0	2019 FIFA Women's World Cup qualification
14	30 August 2019	Zimbru Stadium, Chișinău, Moldova	Moldova	1–0	7–0	UEFA Women's Euro 2022 qualifying
15	30 August 2019	Zimbru Stadium, Chișinău, Moldova	Moldova	2–0	7–0	UEFA Women's Euro 2022 qualifying
16	1 December 2020	Letní stadion, Chomutov, Czech Republic	Moldova	4–0	7–0	UEFA Women's Euro 2022 qualifying
17	9 April 2021	Letní stadion, Chomutov, Czech Republic	Switzerland	1–0	1–1	UEFA Women's Euro 2022 qualifying play-offs
18	13 April 2021	Stockhorn Arena, Thun, Switzerland	Switzerland	1–0	1–1 (a.e.t.) (2–3 p)	UEFA Women's Euro 2022 qualifying play-offs
19	27 November 2021	Městský stadion, Ostrava, Czech Republic	Netherlands	1–0	2–2	2023 FIFA Women's World Cup qualification
20	1 September 2022	AEK Arena, Larnaca, Cyprus	Cyprus	5–0	6–0	2023 FIFA Women's World Cup qualification
21	6 September 2022	Antonis Papadopoulos Stadium, Larnaca, Cyprus	Belarus	1–0	7–0	2023 FIFA Women's World Cup qualification
22	6 September 2022	Antonis Papadopoulos Stadium, Larnaca, Cyprus	Belarus	2–0	7–0	2023 FIFA Women's World Cup qualification
23	15 November 2022	Stadionul Arcul de Triumf, Bucharest, Romania	Romania	2–1	2–1	Friendly
24	12 July 2024	Letní stadion, Chomutov, Czech Republic	Spain	1–1	2–1	UEFA Women's Euro 2025 qualifying
25	25 October 2024	Gradski stadion Velika Gorica, Velika Gorica, Croatia	Belarus	2–0	8–1	UEFA Women's Euro 2025 qualifying play-offs
26	25 October 2024	Gradski stadion Velika Gorica, Velika Gorica, Croatia	Belarus	3–1	8–1	UEFA Women's Euro 2025 qualifying play-offs
27	29 November 2024	Estádio do Dragão, Porto, Portugal	Portugal	1–0	1–1	UEFA Women's Euro 2025 qualifying play-offs
28	3 December 2024	Na Stínadlech, Teplice, Czech Republic	Portugal	1–1	1–2	UEFA Women's Euro 2025 qualifying play-offs
29	21 February 2025	Stadion Aldo Drosina, Pula, Croatia	Croatia	4–0	4–0	2025 UEFA Women's Nations League
30	25 February 2025	Stadion Střelecký ostrov, České Budějovice, Czech Republic	Albania	1–1	5–1	2025 UEFA Women's Nations League
31	25 February 2025	Stadion Střelecký ostrov, České Budějovice, Czech Republic	Albania	2–1	5–1	2025 UEFA Women's Nations League
32	8 April 2025	Městský stadion, Ústí nad Labem, Czech Republic	Ukraine	1–0	1–1	2025 UEFA Women's Nations League
33	30 May 2025	Letní stadion, Chomutov, Czech Republic	Croatia	2–0	5–0	2025 UEFA Women's Nations League

== Honours ==
Slavia Prague

- Czech Women's First League: 2013–14, 2014–15, 2015–16, 2016–17, 2019–20
- Czech Women's Cup: 2014, 2016

Chelsea

- FA Women's Super League: 2022–23
- Women's FA Cup: 2022–23

== Media and broadcasting ==
Svitková joined Canal+ Sport in their Premier League coverage as studio analyst, as well as she joined ČT Sport in their UEFA Euro 2024 coverage.

== Personal life ==
On 3 October 2025, Slavia Prague announced on Facebook Svitková's pregnancy and pause in her career. On 27 February 2026, Svitková announced the birth of her daughter Zoe.
