= Czech Republic women's national football team =

Women's national association football team representing Czech Republic

Czech Republic
- Nickname: Lvice (The Lionesses)
- Association: Football Association of the Czech Republic (FAČR)
- Confederation: UEFA (Europe)
- Head coach: Jitka Klimková
- Captain: Klára Cahynová
- Most caps: Klára Cahynová (132)
- Top scorer: Gabriela Chlumecká (52)
- Home stadium: Various
- FIFA code: CZE
First colours	Second colours

FIFA ranking
- Current: 34 ▼1 (20 October 2026)
- Highest: 19 (September 2006 – December 2007)
- Lowest: 37 (September 2017)

First international
- Czech Republic 6–0 Slovakia (Czech Republic; 21 June 1993)

Biggest win
- Lithuania 0–12 Czech Republic (Vilnius, Lithuania; 10 October 1997)

Biggest defeat
- Czech Republic 0–9 Norway (Prague, Czech Republic; 24 September 1994)

The Czech Republic women's national football team is the women's association football team of the Czech Republic.

== Results and fixtures ==
The following is a list of match results in the last 12 months, as well as any future matches that have been scheduled.

Legend

Win Draw Lose Fixture

=== 2025 ===
28 November 2025 Friendly	Czech Republic	0–1	Serbia	Antalya, Turkey
13:00		Report	Damnjanović 17'

2 December 2025 Friendly	Czech Republic	1–2	Serbia	Antalya, Turkey
13:00	Cahynová 46'	Report	Matejić 2'; Filipović 57' (pen.)

=== 2026 ===
3 March 2027 FIFA Women's World Cup qualification	Czech Republic	2–2	Wales	Uherské Hradiště, Czech Republic
18:30	Bartoňová 16'; Žufánková 54'	Report (UEFA)	Cain 30'; Hughes 90+3'	Stadium: Městský fotbalový stadion Miroslava Valenty; Attendance: 2,358; Referee: Volha Blotskaya (Belarus)

7 March 2027 FIFA Women's World Cup qualification	Albania	1–5	Czech Republic	Shkodër, Albania
18:00	F. Berisha 18'	Report	Cvrčková 14', 68'; Khýrová 37', 62'; Černá 50'	Stadium: Loro Boriçi Stadium; Referee: Lotta Vuorio (Finland)

14 April 2027 FIFA Women's World Cup qualification	Czech Republic	5–0	Montenegro	Chomutov, Czech Republic
17:30	Kalač 9' (o.g.); Černá 13'; Cahynová 30', 65'; Polášková 50'	Report		Stadium: Letní stadion Referee: Tatyana Sorokopudova (Kazakhstan)

18 April 2027 FIFA Women's World Cup qualification	Montenegro	1–4	Czech Republic	Nikšić, Montenegro
16:00	Bulatović 24' (pen.)	Report	Cahynová 7'; Khýrová 38'; Švíbková 67'; K. Dubcová 70' (pen.)	Stadium: Gradski stadion Referee: Louise Thompson (Northern Ireland)

5 June 2027 FIFA Women's World Cup qualification	Czech Republic	1–1	Albania	Prague, Czech Republic
17:30	Cahynová 47'	Report	Levendi 70'	Stadium: FK Viktoria Stadion; Referee: Franziska Wildfeuer (Germany)

9 June 2027 FIFA Women's World Cup qualification	Wales	3–1	Czech Republic	Cardiff, Wales
19:00	Woodham 9'; Evans 49'; Griffiths 72'	Report	Khýrová 5'	Stadium: Cardiff City Stadium; Referee: Deborah Bianchi (Italy)

9 October 2027 FIFA Women's World Cup qualification	Czech Republic	0–2	Scotland	Pardubice, Czech Republic
19:00		Report	Weir 57'; Emslie 65'	Stadium: Stadion Arnošta Košťála; Referee: Hristiyana Guteva (Bulgaria)

13 October 2027 FIFA Women's World Cup qualification	Scotland	3–2	Czech Republic	Paisley, Scotland
20:15	Davidson 5'; McGovern 49'; Grimshaw 73'	Report	Veselá 3'; Cahynová 33'	Stadium: St Mirren Park; Referee: Maria Sole Ferrieri Caputi (Italy)

== Coaching staff ==
=== Current coaching staff ===
Position	Name	Ref.
Head coach	(Czech Republic) Jitka Klimková	
Assistant coach	(United States) Keri Sarver (Czech Republic) Miroslav Zbořil	
Goalkeeping coach	(Slovakia) Peter Bartalský	
Fitness Coach	(Czech Republic) Tomáš Medynský	
Physiotherapist	(Czech Republic) Lucie Fortuníková (Czech Republic) Aleš Smola (Czech Republic) Petra Sklenářová	
Doctor	(Czech Republic) Daniela Mečířová	

=== Manager history ===
- Dušan Žovinec (March 1993 – May 2009)
- Vladimír Hruška (Sept 2009 – June 2012)
- Petr Čermák (Aug 2012 – June 2013)
- Stanislav Krejčík (Aug 2013 – Oct 2014)
- Karel Rada (Feb 2017 – Dec 2024)
- Jitka Klimková (Jan 2025 – present)

== Players ==
=== Current squad ===
The following players were called up for the 2027 FIFA Women's World Cup qualification matches against Albania and Wales on 5 and 9 June 2026, respectively.

Caps and goals correct as of 9 June 2026, after the match against Wales.

No.	Pos.	Player	Date of birth (age)	Caps	Goals	Club
1	GK	Barbora Votíková	13 September 1996 (age 30)	57	0	(Football Association of the Czech Republic) Slavia Prague
16	GK	Olivie Lukášová	4 June 2001 (age 25)	30	0	(Italian Football Federation) AS Roma
23	GK	Vanesa Jílková	23 August 2005 (age 21)	1	0	(Football Association of the Czech Republic) Slavia Prague
2	DF	Lucie Bendová	3 April 2005 (age 21)	12	0	(Football Association of the Czech Republic) Slavia Prague
3	DF	Eliška Sonntagová	26 July 2001 (age 25)	51	2	(Football Association of the Czech Republic) Sparta Prague
6	DF	Eva Bartoňová	17 October 1993 (age 33)	98	10	(Football Association of the Czech Republic) Sparta Prague
7	DF	Antonie Stárová	12 October 1998 (age 28)	48	1	(Football Association of the Czech Republic) Sparta Prague
8	DF	Aneta Pochmanová	12 April 2001 (age 25)	37	3	(Football Association of the Czech Republic) Sparta Prague
17	DF	Barbora Polcarová	24 July 2002 (age 24)	14	1	(Football Association of the Czech Republic) Slavia Prague
19	DF	Aneta Dědinová	9 March 1994 (age 32)	45	1	(Football Association of the Czech Republic) Slovan Liberec
20	DF	Sabina Střížová	22 January 2004 (age 22)	8	0	(Football Association of the Czech Republic) Slavia Prague
11	MF	Nela Krejčířová	25 July 2000 (age 26)	3	0	(Football Association of the Czech Republic) Slovan Liberec
12	MF	Klára Cahynová (captain)	20 December 1993 (age 32)	130	14	(Royal Spanish Football Federation) Real Sociedad
13	MF	Anna Šubrtová	1 November 2002 (age 24)	3	0	(Football Association of the Czech Republic) Slovan Liberec
15	MF	Kateřina Kotrčová	27 April 2000 (age 26)	29	1	(Polish Football Association) Pogoń Szczecin
18	MF	Lucie Kroupová	21 March 2007 (age 19)	0	0	(Football Association of the Czech Republic) Slavia Prague
22	MF	Franny Černá	22 July 1997 (age 29)	56	5	(Football Association of the Czech Republic) Sparta Prague
4	FW	Klára Cvrčková	25 July 2001 (age 25)	22	3	(Football Association of the Czech Republic) Slavia Prague
5	FW	Aneta Polášková	3 May 2002 (age 24)	19	2	(German Football Association) Viktoria 1889 Berlin
9	FW	Radka Hlouchová	25 January 2004 (age 22)	0	0	(Football Association of the Czech Republic) Slovan Liberec
10	FW	Jana Žufánková	14 November 2002 (age 24)	14	1	(French Football Federation) Saint-Étienne
14	FW	Michaela Khýrová	3 February 2000 (age 26)	50	14	(Football Association of the Czech Republic) Sparta Prague
21	FW	Andrea Švíbková	10 July 2004 (age 22)	2	1	(Austrian Football Association) LASK

=== Recent call-ups ===
The following players have also been called up to the squad within the past 12 months.

Pos.	Player	Date of birth (age)	Caps	Goals	Club	Latest call-up
GK	Barbora Růžičková	20 April 1998 (age 28)	8	0	(Czech Republic) Slovácko	v. Albania, 7 March 2026
GK	Anna Pučová	22 March 2001 (age 25)	0	0	(Italy) Vis Mediterranea	v. Albania, 7 March 2026
DF	Kristýna Růžičková ^{MED}	5 November 2002 (age 24)	25	0	(Czech Republic) Slavia Prague	v. Albania, 5 June 2026
DF	Denisa Veselá	8 January 1998 (age 28)	25	0	(Czech Republic) Slavia Prague	v. Montenegro, 18 April 2026
DF	Denisa Tenkrátová ^{MED}	1 November 2004 (age 22)	1	0	(Czech Republic) Slovan Liberec	v. Montenegro, 18 April 2026
DF	Lucie Krejčová	19 August 2006 (age 20)	0	0	(Czech Republic) Slovácko	v. Austria, 28 October 2025
MF	Kamila Dubcová ^{MED}	17 January 1999 (age 27)	67	19	(Czech Republic) Slavia Prague	v. Albania, 5 June 2026
MF	Tereza Krejčiříková	21 June 1996 (age 30)	65	6	(Czech Republic) Slavia Prague	v. Albania, 7 March 2026
FW	Andrea Stašková	12 May 2000 (age 26)	67	20	(Turkey) Fenerbahçe	v. Montenegro, 18 April 2026
FW	Kateřina Vithová	9 March 2006 (age 20)	0	0	(Czech Republic) Slovan Liberec	v. Austria, 28 October 2025
Notes: ^{INJ} = Withdrew due to injury; ^{MED} = Withdrew due to medical reasons; ^{RET} = Retired from national team

=== Previous squads ===
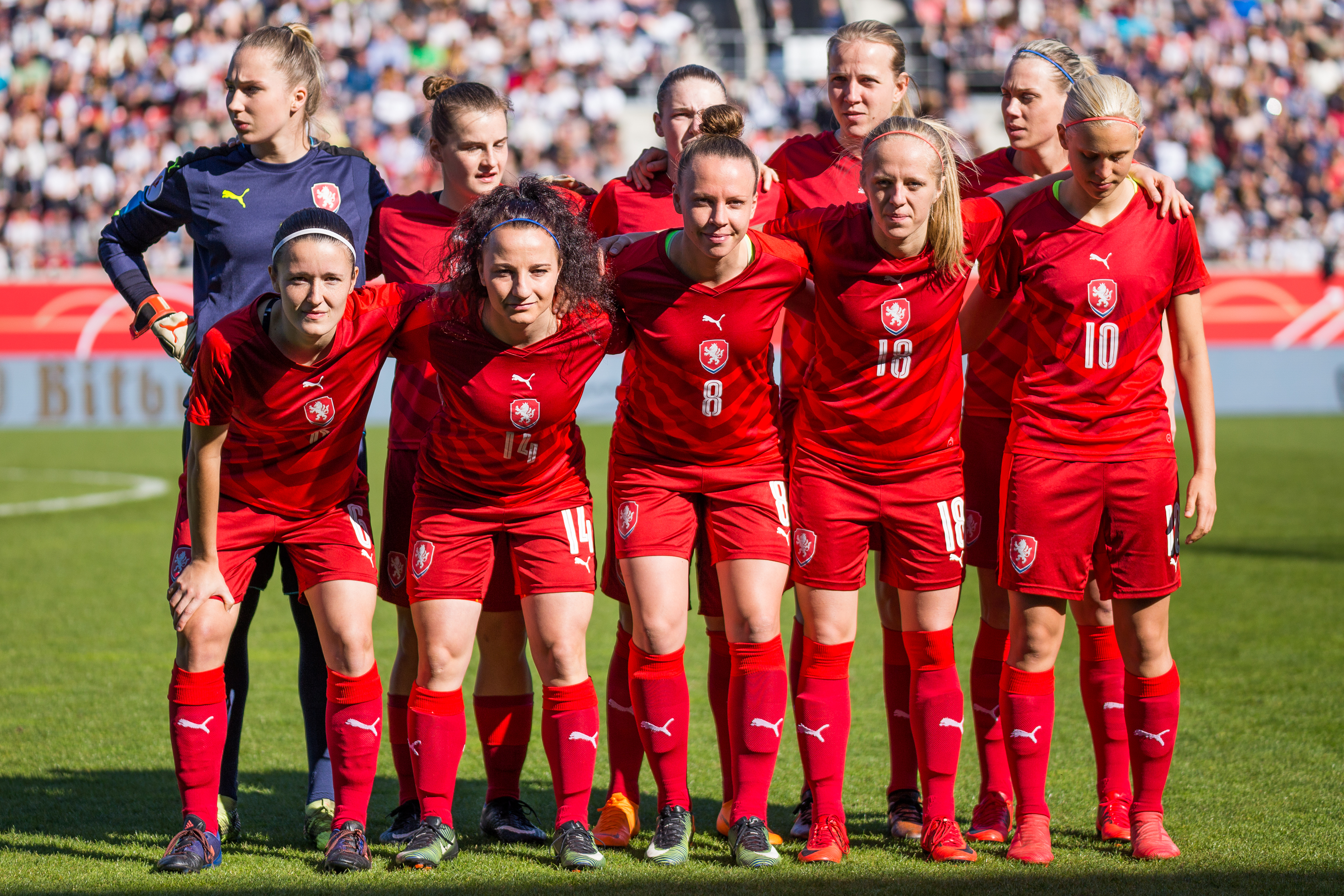
The women's national football team of the Czech Republic in 2018

Cyprus Women's Cup

- 2020 Cyprus Women's Cup
- 2016 Cyprus Women's Cup

SheBelieves Cup

- 2022 SheBelieves Cup

Cup of Nations

- 2023 Cup of Nations

== Records ==
As of 14 October 2026

Players in bold are still active with the national team.

=== Most appearances ===
Rank	Player	Career	Caps	Goals
1	**Klára Cahynová**	2011–present	132	15
2	Lucie Martínková	2003–2023	125	26
3	Petra Bertholdová	2002–2024	124	4
4	**Eva Bartoňová**	2010–present	100	10
5	Petra Vyštejnová	2008–2021	82	0
6	Irena Martínková	2003–2020	76	12
7	Eva Šmeralová	1993–2008	75	14
8	Lucie Voňková	2009–2021	72	22
9	**Kateřina Svitková**	2014–present	70	35
10	**Andrea Stašková**	2018–present	69	20
10	**Kamila Dubcová**	2017–present	69	19

=== Top goalscorers ===
Rank	Player	Career	Goals	Caps	Avg.
1	Gabriela Chlumecká	1993–2007	52	66	0.79
2	**Kateřina Svitková**	2014–present	35	70	0.50
3	Lucie Martínková	2003–2023	26	125	0.21
4	Pavlína Ščasná	1998–2008	24	51	0.47
5	Lucie Voňková	2009–2021	22	72	0.31
6	**Andrea Stašková**	2018–present	20	69	0.29
7	Iveta Dudová	1994–2002	19	40	0.48
7	**Kamila Dubcová**	2017–present	19	69	0.28
9	Petra Divišová	2007–2019	18	58	0.31
10	**Klára Cahynová**	2011–present	15	132	0.11

== Competitive record ==
=== FIFA Women's World Cup ===
FIFA Women's World Cup record									Qualification record						
Year	Result	GP	W	D*	L	GF	GA	GD	GP	W	D*	L	GF	GA	GD
as Czechoslovakia															
(China) 1991	Did not qualify								UEFA Euro 1991						
as Czech Republic															
(Sweden) 1995	Did not qualify								UEFA Euro 1995						
(United States) 1999	Did not qualify								6	4	2	0	37	2	+35
(United States) 2003	Did not qualify								6	0	0	6	6	23	-17
(China) 2007	Did not qualify								8	5	1	2	20	8	+12
(Germany) 2011	Did not qualify								8	4	1	3	19	6	+13
(Canada) 2015	Did not qualify								10	4	2	4	21	18	+3
(France) 2019	Did not qualify								8	4	2	2	20	8	+12
(Australia) (New Zealand) 2023	Did not qualify								8	3	2	3	25	10	+15
(Brazil) 2027	To be determined								To be determined						
(Costa Rica) (Jamaica) (Mexico) (United States) 2031	To be determined								To be determined						
(United Kingdom) 2035	To be determined								To be determined						
Total	-	-	-	-	-	-	-	-	54	24	10	20	148	75	+73

*Draws include knockout matches decided on penalty kicks.

=== UEFA Women's Championship ===
UEFA Women's Championship record								Qualifying record							
Year	Result	Pld	W	D*	L	GS	GA	Pld	W	D*	L	GS	GA	P/R	Rnk
as Czechoslovakia															
(England) (Italy) (Norway) (Sweden) 1984	Did not enter							Did not enter							
(Norway) 1987	Did not enter							Did not enter							
(West Germany) 1989	Did not qualify							10	4	5	1	11	6	–	
(Denmark) 1991	Did not qualify							6	3	0	3	8	10	–	
(Italy) 1993	Did not qualify							4	2	1	1	7	6	–	
as Czech Republic															
(England) (Germany) (Norway) (Sweden) 1995	Did not qualify							6	0	3	3	5	23	–	
(Norway) (Sweden) 1997	Did not qualify							8	6	0	2	32	7	–	
(Germany) 2001	Did not qualify							8	6	1	1	22	7	–	
(England) 2005	Did not qualify							10	4	1	5	16	20	–	
(Finland) 2009	Did not qualify							10	4	2	4	19	7	–	
(Sweden) 2013	Did not qualify							8	4	1	3	16	9	–	
(Netherlands) 2017	Did not qualify							8	3	1	4	13	18	–	
(England) 2022	Did not qualify							10	5	3	2	26	11	–	
(Switzerland) 2025	Did not qualify							10	2	3	5	16	16	▼ (Note: From Euro 2025 onwards a new qualifying format was introduced, linked to the Women's Nations League where teams are divided into leagues with promotion/relegation between the leagues at the end of each cycle.)	14th
Total	-	-	-	-	-	-	-	98	43	21	34	191	140	14th	

*Draws include knockout matches decided on penalty kicks.

==== Qualification match record ====
Competition	Stage	Results	Opponents	Position	Scorers
1995 European Championship qualification	1st Stage	1–6 0–9; 0–0 4–4; 0–0 0–4	Norway; Hungary; Finland	4 / 4	
1997 European Championship qualification	1st Stage (Class B)	11–0 7–0; 1–0 5–2; 1–0 6–2	Estonia; Belarus; Poland	1 / 4	
	Play-off	1–2 0–1	Netherlands		
1999 World Cup qualification	1st Stage (Class B)	1–1 1–1; 6–0 8–0; 12–0 9–0	Scotland; Estonia; Lithuania	2 / 4	
2001 European Championship qualification	1st Stage (Class B)	1–1 4–0; 1–2 5–1; 2–1 5–0	(Republic of Ireland) Ireland; Scotland; Croatia	1 / 4	
	Play-off	1–0 3–2	(Serbia and Montenegro) Yugoslavia		
2003 World Cup qualification	1st Stage (Class A)	1–4 2–3; 0–5 1–5; 1–2 1–4	Ukraine; Norway; France	4 / 4	Chlumecká, Pěničková, Urbancová; Dudová; Chlumecká, Ščasná
2005 European Championship qualification	1st Stage (Class A)	1–1 4–1; 0–4 0–5; 2–0 2–3; 1–0 5–1	Ukraine; Germany; Scotland; Portugal	2 / 5	Pěničková 2, Ščasná 2, Došková Mocová, Mouchová, Ščasná; L. Martínková 2, Ščasná 2, Knavová, Pěničková
	Play-off	1–2 0–3	Italy		Ščasná
2007 World Cup qualification	1st Stage (Class A)	1–1 3–0; 1–0 4–2; 3–0 6–0; 2–3 0–2	Belarus; Iceland; Portugal; Sweden	2 / 5	Chlumecká, Hejlová, Kladrubská, Ščasná; L. Martínková, Mouchová, Pěničková, Ščasná + 1 o.g. Chlumecká 2, L. Martínková 2, Pěničková 2, Ščasná 2, Kňavová; Ščasná, Mouchová
2009 European Championship qualification	1st Stage	3–1 4–0; 4–1 3–1; 2–2 1–4; 0–0 1–5	Northern Ireland; Belarus; Spain; England	3 / 5	Chlumecká 3, L. Martínková 2, Došková, Šmeralová; Ščasná 3, I. Martínková 2, Heroldová, Ringelová; Heroldová, Kňavová, I. Martínková; Došková
	Play-off	0–1 1–2	Italy		Ščasná
2011 World Cup qualification	1st Stage	0–2 2–1; 1–2 3–0; 5–0 8–0; 0–0 0–1	Wales; Belgium; Azerbaijan; Sweden	2 / 5	Pincová 2 Divišová 3 Divišová 3, Pivoňková 2, Martínková 2, Mocová 2, Došková, Heroldová, Krůzová, Nepokojová
2013 European Championship qualification	1st Stage	1–1 2–3; 1–0 5–2; 5–0 2–0; 0–2 0–1	Austria; Portugal; Armenia; Denmark	3 / 5	Divišová, I. Martínková, Mocová; I. Martínková 3, Divišová 2, Pivoňková; Danihelková, Hoferková, I. Martínková, L. Martínková, Pivoňková, Ringelová, Sedláčková
2015 FIFA Women's World Cup qualification	1st Stage	1–6 0–4; 2–3 0–1; 0–0 0–0; 6–0 4–1; 3–1 5–2	Italy; Spain; Romania; Estonia (North Macedonia) Macedonia	3 / 6	Divišová; I. Martínková, Voňková Kožárová, Cahynová, Krejčiříková 2, Svitková 5 + 1 o.g. Divišová, Voňková 2, L. Martínková 2, Cahynová, Pincová, Hloupá
2017 European Championship qualification	1st Stage	0–3 1–3; 1–5 0–5; 3–0 1–1; 3–0 4–1	Italy; Switzerland; Northern Ireland (Georgia (country)) Georgia	3 / 5	Voňková; Svitková; Voňková, Cahynová, Bartoňová, Chlastáková; Voňková 3, L. Martínková 2, I. Martínková + 1 o.g.
2019 FIFA Women's World Cup qualification	1st Stage	8–0 4–1; 0–1 0–4; 4–0 2–0; 1–1 1–1	Faroe Islands; Germany; Slovenia; Iceland	3 / 5	Kožárová 3, Svitková 3, Voňková 2, Divišová, Bartoňová, L. Martínková, Stárová Divišová 3, Voňková, Kožárová, Svitková; Bartoňová, Szewieczková
2021 European Championship qualification	1st Stage	1–5 0–4; 0–0 2–0; 7–0 7–0; 4–0 3–0	Spain; Poland; Moldova; Azerbaijan	2 / 5	Voňková; Stašková, K. Dubcová; Svitková 3, Stašková 3, Cahynová 2, Bertholdová, L. Martínková, Voňková, Petříková, K. Dubcová, Mrázová; Voňková 2, Stašková, K. Dubcová, Cahynová, Krejčiříková, Szewieczková
	Play-off	1–1 1–1 (2–3 p)	Switzerland	2 / 2	Svitková 2
2023 FIFA Women's World Cup qualification	1st Stage	1–1 2–2; 0–4 0–1; 1–2 7–0; 8–0 6–0	Netherlands; Iceland; Belarus; Cyprus	3 / 5	Stašková, Svitková, Necidová Svitková 2, Szewieczková, K. Dubcová, Khýrová, Sonntagová, Mrázová, Dlasková; Stašková 3, L. Martínková 3, K. Dubcová 2, Krejčiříková, Cvrčková, Khýrová, Szewieczková, Svitková + 1 o.g.
2025 European Championship qualification	1st Stage	1–3 2–1; 1–3 0–2; 1–2 1–1	Spain; Denmark (Belgium) Belgium	4 / 4	Sonntagová, Svitková, Bartoňová; Stašková; K. Dubcová 2
	Play-off	8–1 0–0	Belarus	1 / 2	Svitková 2, K. Dubcová 2, Khýrová, Stašková, Bartoňová, Černá
	Play-off	1–1 1–2	Portugal	2 / 2	Svitková 2
2027 FIFA Women's World Cup qualification	1st Stage	2–2 1–3; 5–1 1–1; 5–0 4–1	Wales; Albania; Montenegro	2 / 4	Bartoňová, Žufánková, Khýrová; Khýrová 2, Cvrčková 2, Černá, Cahynová; Cahynová 3, Černá, Polášková, Khýrová, Švíbková, K. Dubcová + 1 o.g.
	Play-off	0–2 2–3	Scotland	2 / 2	Veselá, Cahynová

=== UEFA Women's Nations League ===
UEFA Women's Nations League record
Year	League	Group	Pos	Pld	W	D	L	GF	GA	P/R	RK
2023–24	B	4	1st	6	4	1	1	11	4	▲	20th
2025	B	4	To be determined								
Total				6	4	1	1	11	4	20th	

▲	Promoted at end of season
Same position	No movement at end of season
▼	Relegated at end of season
*	Participated in promotion/relegation play-offs

=== Other tournaments ===
Year	Result	Matches	Wins	Draws	Losses	GF	GA
2022 SheBelieves Cup	3rd	3	0	2	1	1	2
2023 Cup of Nations	3rd	3	1	0	2	3	9

== See also ==
- Czech Republic women's national football team
  - Czech Republic women's national football team results
  - List of Czech Republic women's international footballers
- Czech Republic women's national under-19 football team
- Czech Republic women's national under-17 football team
