= Lucie Voňková =

Czech footballer

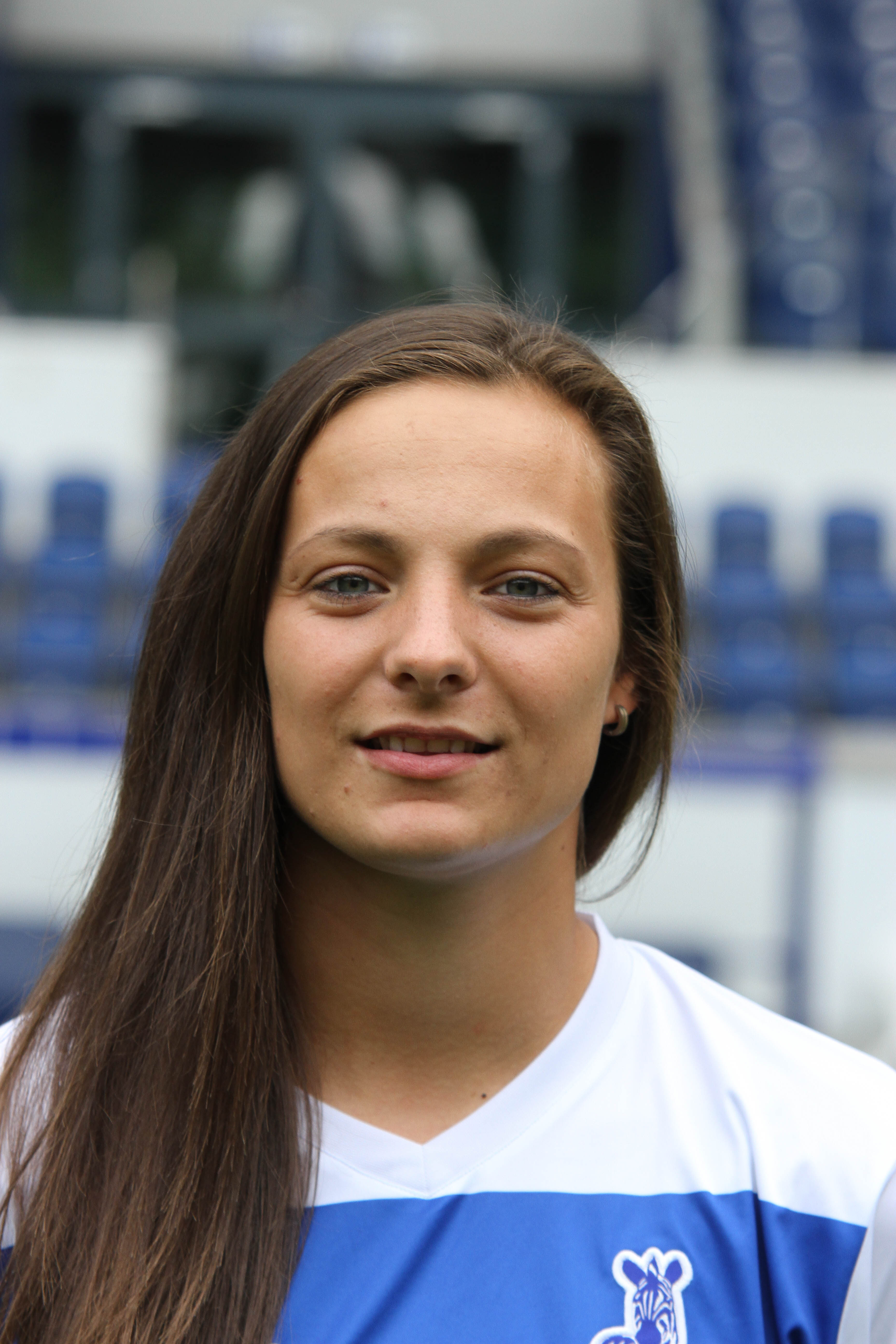
- Voňková with MSV Duisburg in 2014

Personal information
- Date of birth: 28 February 1992 (age 34)
- Place of birth: Teplice, Czechoslovakia
- Height: 1.82 m (6 ft 0 in)
- Position: Striker

Youth career
- Teplice

Senior career*
Years	Team	Apps	(Gls)
2006–2012	Slavia Prague	99	(59)
2012–2013	Sparta Prague	24	(18)
2013	FCR 2001 Duisburg	14	(1)
2014	MSV Duisburg	18	(1)
2015–2017	FF USV Jena	34	(12)
2017–2019	Bayern Munich	22	(5)
2019–2021	Ajax	9	(1)

International career
2009–2021	Czech Republic	72	(22)
- * Club domestic league appearances and goals

Lucie Voňková (28 February 1992) is a Czech former footballer who played as a striker. She was a member of the Czech Republic national team. As well as playing six seasons in her native country, she played for six seasons in Germany and two in the Netherlands.

Voňková was top scorer of the international indoor football tournament Weltklasse 2013.

Voňková was voted footballer of the year at the 2016 and 2017 Czech Footballer of the Year (women).

== Club career ==
Raised in FK Teplice, Voňková started her career in Slavia Prague, where she spent six years. In 2012, Voňková moved to Slavia's rival Sparta Prague. In her only season with Sparta, she won the domestic double and she made her UEFA Champions League debut. For the 2013–14 season she moved to Frauen-Bundesliga, signing for MSV Duisburg. After two tough years in Duisburg, where she slowly adapted to higher quality of Bundesliga, Voňková moved to FF USV Jena and she started scoring goals more often. On 7 July 2017, Voňková signed for Bayern Munich. She joined Ajax in the Eredivisie in 2019. She announced her retirement in June 2021 at the age of 29, for health reasons.

== International career ==
Voňková made her debut for the national team in a friendly match against Poland on 31 May 2009. By the time of her retirement in June 2021, she was captain of the national team and had scored 22 goals in 72 matches for her country.

== Personal life ==
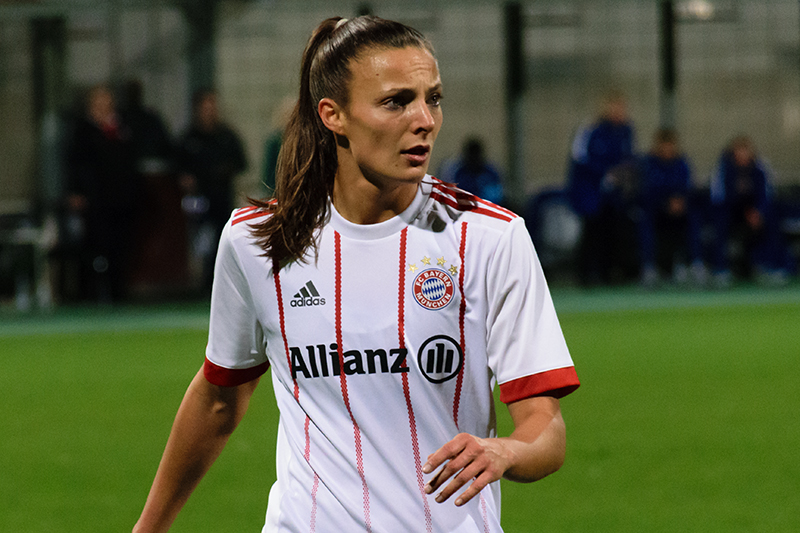
Voňková with Bayern Munich in 2017

In September 2018 Voňková married her partner Claudia van den Heiligenberg. In March 2021 Voňková announced van den Heiligenberg's pregnancy on social media. On 10 July 2023, Voňková announced on social media her own pregnancy.

== Career statistics ==
Goals for the Czech WNT in official competitions
Competition	Stage	Date	Location	Opponent	Goals	Result	Overall
2015 FIFA World Cup	Qualifiers	26 October 2013	Strumica	North Macedonia	2	3–1	3
2015 FIFA World Cup	Qualifiers	2013–11–27	Fuenlabrada	Spain	1	2–3	3
2017 UEFA Euro	Qualifiers	22 September 2015	Tbilisi	Georgia	1	3–0	3
2017 UEFA Euro	Qualifiers	2016–04–12	Opava	Georgia	1	4–1	3
2017 UEFA Euro	Qualifiers	2016–06–07	Jablonec	Northern Ireland	1	3–0	3
2019 FIFA World Cup	Qualifiers	14 September 2017	Tórshavn	Faroe Islands	1	8–0	TBD
2019 FIFA World Cup	Qualifiers	2017–10–20	Domžale	Slovenia	1	4–0	TBD

== International goals ==
No.	Date	Venue	Opponent	Score	Result	Competition
1.	26 October 2013	Stadion Mladost, Strumica, Macedonia	Macedonia	2–0	3–1	2015 FIFA Women's World Cup qualification
2.	26 October 2013	Stadion Mladost, Strumica, Macedonia	Macedonia	3–1	3–1	2015 FIFA Women's World Cup qualification
3.	27 November 2013	Estadio Fernando Torres, Fuenlabrada, Spain	Spain	2–3	2–3	2015 FIFA Women's World Cup qualification
4.	4 March 2015	Paralimni Stadium, Paralimni, Cyprus	Belgium	1–0	2–2	2015 Cyprus Women's Cup
5.	22 September 2015	Mikheil Meskhi Stadium, Tbilisi, Georgia	Georgia	2–0	3–0	UEFA Women's Euro 2017 qualifying
6.	4 March 2016	Paralimni Stadium, Paralimni, Cyprus	Finland	2–0	3–1	2016 Cyprus Women's Cup
7.	4 March 2016	Paralimni Stadium, Paralimni, Cyprus	Finland	3–0	3–1	2016 Cyprus Women's Cup
8.	9 March 2016	GSZ Stadium, Larnaca, Cyprus	Italy	1–0	1–3	2016 Cyprus Women's Cup
9.	12 April 2016	Stadion v Městských sadech, Opava, Czech Republic	Georgia	3–1	4–1	UEFA Women's Euro 2017 qualifying
10.	7 June 2016	Stadion Střelnice, Jablonec nad Nisou, Czech Republic	Northern Ireland	1–0	3–0	UEFA Women's Euro 2017 qualifying
11.	20 September 2016	Stadio Silvio Piola, Vercelli, Italy	Italy	1–1	1–3	UEFA Women's Euro 2017 qualifying
12.	14 September 2017	Tórsvøllur, Tórshavn, Faroe Islands	Faroe Islands	8–0	8–0	2019 FIFA Women's World Cup qualification
13.	20 October 2017	Domžale Sports Park, Domžale, Slovenia	Slovenia	4–0	4–0	2019 FIFA Women's World Cup qualification
14.	12 June 2018	Letní stadion, Chomutov, Czech Republic	Faroe Islands	3–0	4–1	2019 FIFA Women's World Cup qualification
15.	30 August 2019	Zimbru Stadium, Chișinău, Moldova	Moldova	7–0	7–0	UEFA Women's Euro 2022 qualifying
16.	8 October 2019	Ďolíček, Prague, Czech Republic	Spain	1–5	1–5	UEFA Women's Euro 2022 qualifying
17.	7 November 2019	Bayil Arena, Baku, Azerbaijan	Azerbaijan	1–0	4–0	UEFA Women's Euro 2022 qualifying
18.	7 November 2019	Bayil Arena, Baku, Azerbaijan	Azerbaijan	3–0	4–0	UEFA Women's Euro 2022 qualifying

== Honours ==
Sparta

- Czech Women's First League: 2012–13
- Czech Women's Cup: 2013

Individual

- Czech Footballer of the Year (women): 2016, 2017
