= Lucie Martínková =

Czech footballer (born 1986)

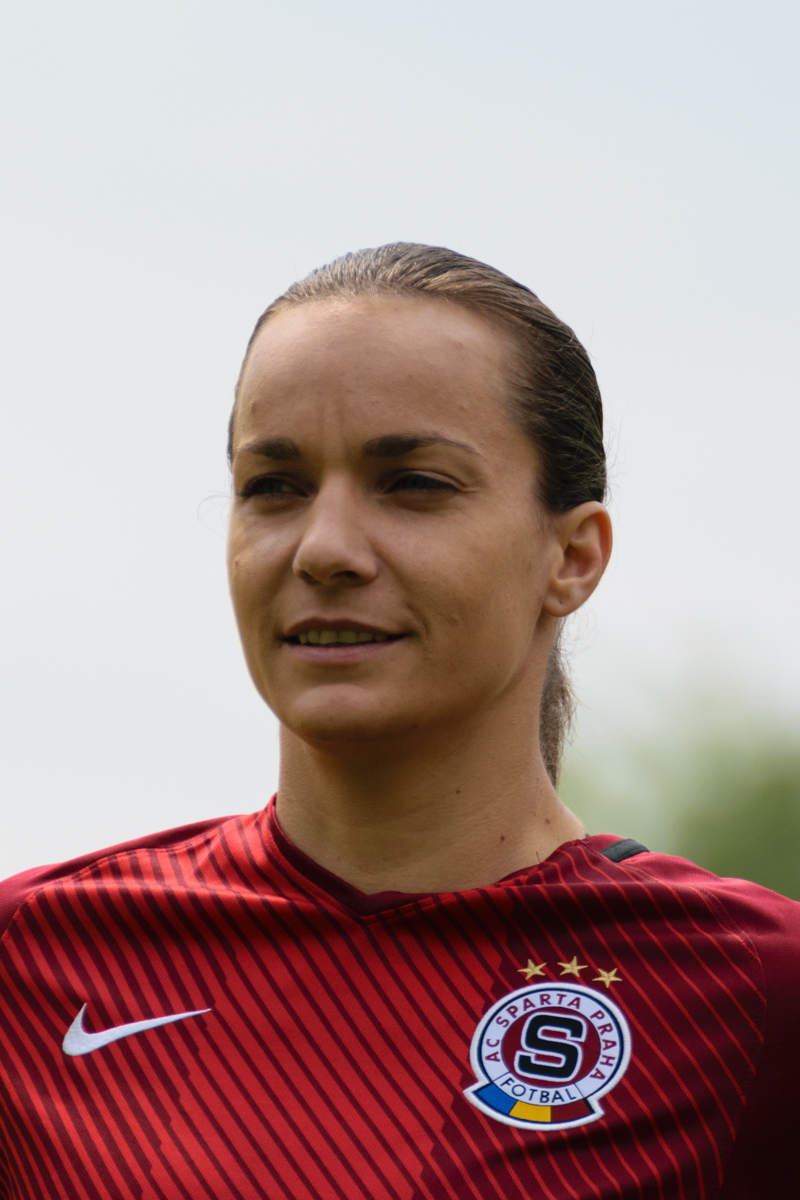
- Lucie Martínková in 2019

Personal information
- Full name: Lucie Martínková
- Date of birth: 19 September 1986 (age 40)
- Place of birth: Kolín, Czechoslovakia
- Height: 1.72 m (5 ft 8 in)
- Positions: Striker; midfielder

Team information
- Current team: Prague Raptors (manager)

Youth career
- Přerov nad Labem

Senior career*
| Years | Team | Apps | (Gls) |
- Jizera Předměřice
| 2001–2013 | Sparta Prague | | |
| 2013–2014 | Örebro | 36 | (7) |
| 2014–2024 | Sparta Prague | | |

International career^{‡}
| 2003–2023 | Czech Republic | 125 | (26) |

Managerial career
- 2023–2025: Sparta Prague women (assistant)
- 2023–: Czech Republic wu-19 (assistant)
- 2025–: Prague Raptors
- * Club domestic league appearances and goals ‡ National team caps and goals as of 6 September 2023

Lucie Martínková (born 19 September 1986) is a Czech former football striker, who played for Sparta Prague in the Czech Women's First League and the Champions League.

== Career ==
Martínková scored both goals in Sparta's 2–1 round of 32, second leg win against Apollon Limassol in the 2011–12 UEFA Women's Champions League.

On 8 June 2003, Martinková debuted for the Czech women's senior squad in a friendly match against Ukraine. On 1 December 2020, Martínková played her 100th match for the Czech Republic in a 7–0 home win over Moldova in the UEFA Women's Euro 2022 qualifying.

== Coaching career ==
On 12 August 2025, Martínková left Sparta Prague to become the manager of Prague Raptors.

== International goals ==
| No. | Date | Venue | Opponent | Score | Result | Competition |
|---|---|---|---|---|---|---|
| 1. | 27 November 2013 | Estadio Fernando Torres, Fuenlabrada, Spain | Spain | 1–3 | 2–3 | 2015 FIFA Women's World Cup qualification |
| 3. | 30 August 2019 | Zimbru Stadium, Chișinău, Moldova | Moldova | 4–0 | 7–0 | UEFA Women's Euro 2022 qualifying |
| 4. | 21 September 2021 | Stadion u Nisy, Liberec, Czech Republic | Cyprus | 5–0 | 8–0 | 2023 FIFA Women's World Cup qualification |
| 5. | 21 September 2021 | Stadion u Nisy, Liberec, Czech Republic | Cyprus | 7–0 | 8–0 | 2023 FIFA Women's World Cup qualification |
| 6. | 1 September 2022 | AEK Arena – Georgios Karapatakis, Larnaca, Cyprus | Cyprus | 1–0 | 6–0 | 2023 FIFA Women's World Cup qualification |

== Personal life ==
Her twin sister, Irena Martínková was also a women's footballer who played alongside her for club and country. In 2013 and 2014, the Martínková sisters played for KIF Örebro DFF of the Swedish Damallsvenskan.

== Honours ==
Martínková was voted talent of the year at the 2004 Czech Footballer of the Year (women) and Czech Footballer of the Year (women) at the 2012, 2013 and 2014. In the 2014–15, 2020–21, and 2021–22 seasons, she was the top scorer of the Czech Women's First League.

== See also ==
- List of women's footballers with 100 or more international caps
