= Klára Cahynová =

Czech footballer (born 1993)

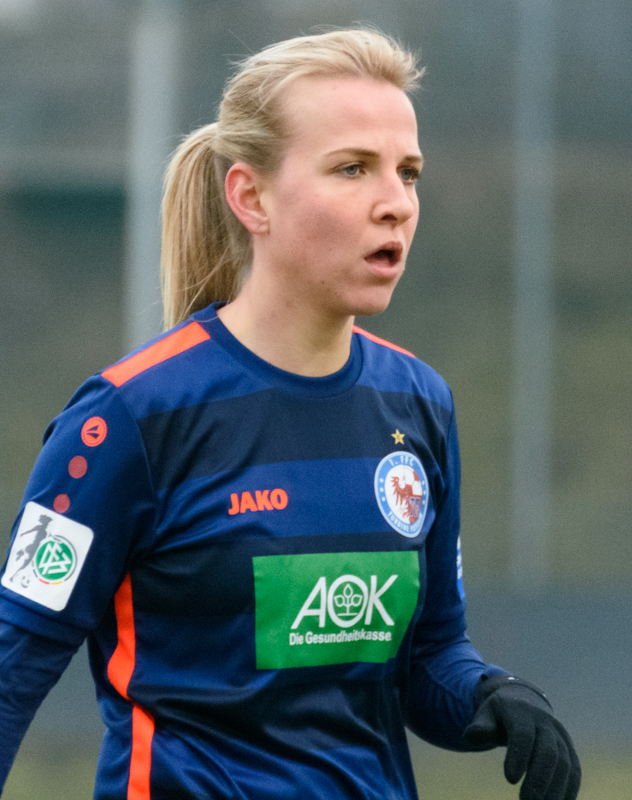
- Cahynová with Turbine Potsdam in 2019

Personal information
- Date of birth: 20 December 1993 (age 32)
- Place of birth: Zlín, Czech Republic
- Height: 1.78 m (5 ft 10 in)
- Position: Midfielder

Team information
- Current team: Real Sociedad
- Number: 22

College career
Years	Team	Apps	(Gls)
2014–2016	UNOH Racers		

Senior career*
Years	Team	Apps	(Gls)
2007–2011	Slovácko		
2011–2018	Slavia Prague	67	(23)
2018–2020	Turbine Potsdam	37	(0)
2020–2021	Slavia Prague	18	(5)
2021–2024	Sevilla	80	(2)
2024–	Real Sociedad	43	(5)

International career^{‡}
2011–	Czech Republic	132	(15)
- * Club domestic league appearances and goals as of 03:40, 17 December 2025 (UTC) ‡ National team caps and goals as of 13 October 2026

Klára Cahynová (born 20 December 1993) is a Czech professional footballer who plays as a midfielder for Spanish Liga F club Real Sociedad and the Czech Republic women's national team.

== Career ==
Cahynová first played the Czech Women's First League in Slovácko. She made her debut for the national team on 3 June 2011 in a friendly match against Nigeria, and that summer she signed for Slavia Prague, with which she first played the UEFA Champions League, reaching the quarterfinals. In the 2017–18 winter transfer window she moved to Turbine Potsdam in the German Bundesliga. In the 2021–22 summer transfer window she moved to Sevilla FC in the Spanish Liga F. On 26 July 2024, Cahynová signed a contract with another Spanish club Real Sociedad until end of the 2025–2026 season.

Cahynová was voted footballer of the year at the 2023 and 2025 Czech Footballer of the Year (women).

On 7 March 2026, Cahynová led the Czech team out against Albania and became the most capped player in the history of Czech football, with 126 caps.

== Honours ==
Slavia Prague

- Czech First League (4): 2013–14, 2014–15, 2015–16, 2016–17.
- Czech Cup (2): 2013–14, 2015–16.

Individual

- Czech Footballer of the Year (2): 2023, 2025

== International goals ==
No.	Date	Venue	Opponent	Score	Result	Competition
1.	26 April 2014	Stadion v Městských sadech, Opava, Czech Republic	Estonia	2–0	6–0	2015 FIFA Women's World Cup qualification
2.	18 June 2014	FK Viktoria Stadion, Prague, Czech Republic	Macedonia	1–0	5–2	2015 FIFA Women's World Cup qualification
3.	7 June 2016	Stadion Střelnice, Jablonec nad Nisou, Czech Republic	Northern Ireland	2–0	3–0	UEFA Women's Euro 2017 qualifying
4.	30 August 2019	Zimbru Stadium, Chișinău, Moldova	Moldova	5–0	7–0	UEFA Women's Euro 2022 qualifying
5.	27 October 2020	Letní stadion, Chomutov, Czech Republic	Azerbaijan	1–0	3–0	UEFA Women's Euro 2022 qualifying
6.	1 December 2020	Letní stadion, Chomutov, Czech Republic	Moldova	2–0	7–0	UEFA Women's Euro 2022 qualifying
7.	19 February 2023	CommBank Stadium, Sydney, Australia	Jamaica	2–1	3–2	2023 Cup of Nations
8.	22 September 2023	Matija Gubec Stadium, Krško, Slovenia	Slovenia	2–0	2–0	2023–24 UEFA Women's Nations League
9.	26 September 2023	Stadion Radnik, Velika Gorica, Croatia	Belarus	2–0	2–1	2023–24 UEFA Women's Nations League
10.	2 December 2024	Mardan Sports Complex, Antalya, Turkey	Serbia	1–1	1–2	Friendly
11.	18 April 2026	Gradski stadion, Nikšić, Montenegro	Montenegro	1–0	4–1	2027 FIFA Women's World Cup qualification
12.	5 June 2026	FK Viktoria Stadion, Prague, Czech Republic	Albania	1–0	1–1	2027 FIFA Women's World Cup qualification
13.	13 October 2026	St Mirren Park, Paisley, Scotland	Scotland	2–1	2–3	2027 FIFA Women's World Cup qualification play-offs

== See also ==
- List of women's footballers with 100 or more international caps
