= Irena Martínková =

Czech footballer

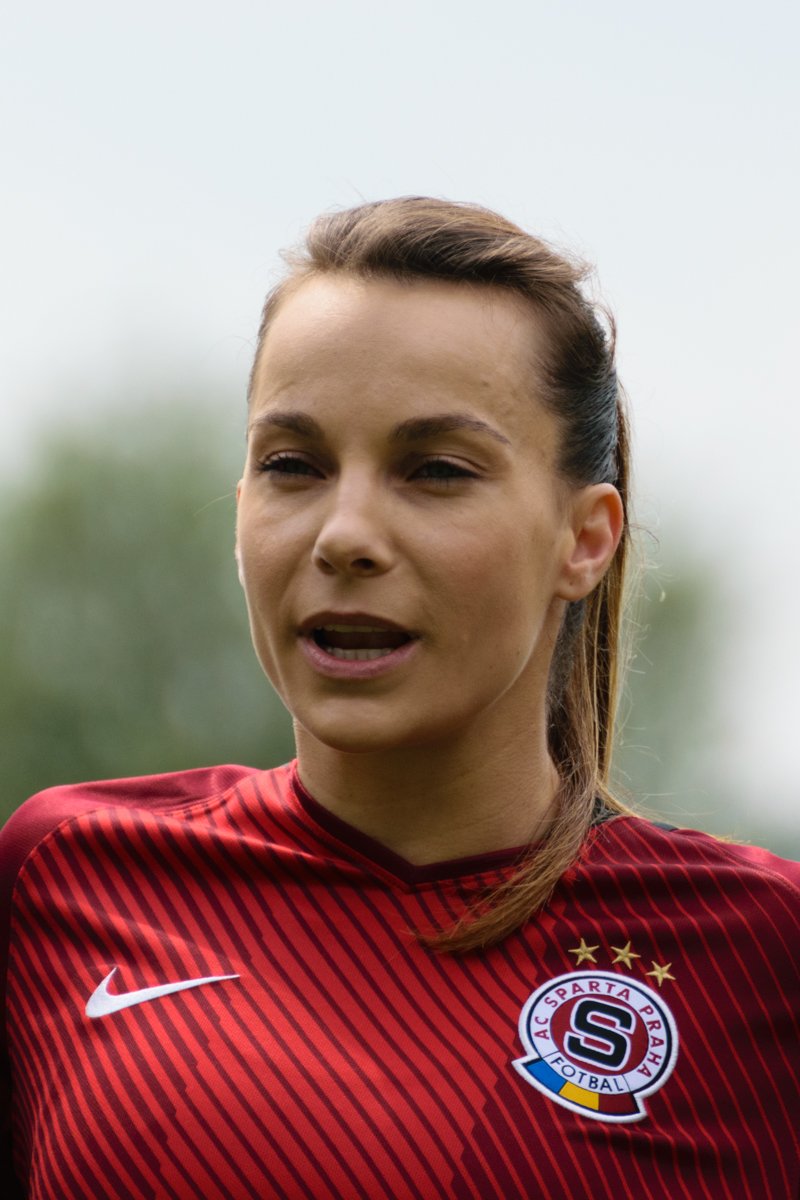
- Martínková in 2019

Personal information
- Full name: Irena Martínková
- Date of birth: 19 September 1986 (age 40)
- Place of birth: Kolín, Czechoslovakia
- Height: 1.66 m (5 ft 5 in)
- Position: Midfielder

Youth career
- Přerov nad Labem

Senior career*
Years	Team	Apps	(Gls)
- Jizera Předměřice
2001–2013	Sparta Prague		
2013–2014	Örebro	35	(4)
2014–2021	Sparta Prague		

International career^{‡}
2003–2021	Czech Republic	76	(12)
- * Club domestic league appearances and goals ‡ National team caps and goals as of 7 April 2022

Irena Martínková (born 19 September 1986) is a Czech former football midfielder, who was a member of the Czech national team. For most of her career she has played for Sparta Prague in the Czech Women's First League and the Champions League. Irena is the older twin of Lucie Martínková, who is also a Czech footballer.

In 2013 and 2014 the Martínková sisters played for KIF Örebro DFF of the Swedish Damallsvenskan.

Goals for the Czech WNT in official competitions
Competition	Stage	Date	Location	Opponent	Goals	Result	Overall
2005 UEFA Euro	Qualifiers	2004–05–09	Hradiště	Portugal	1	5–1	1
2009 UEFA Euro	Qualifiers	2007–10–27	Plzeň	Spain	1	2–2	2
2009 UEFA Euro	Qualifiers	2008–04–26	Roudnice	Northern Ireland	1	4–0	2
2011 FIFA World Cup	Qualifiers	2010–08–25	Prague	Azerbaijan	1	8–0	1
2013 UEFA Euro	Qualifiers	2011–11–20	Roudnice	Armenia	1	5–0	5
2013 UEFA Euro	Qualifiers	2012–03–31	Tondela	Portugal	3	5–2	5
2013 UEFA Euro	Qualifiers	2012–06–16	Prague	Austria	1	2–3	5
2017 UEFA Euro	Qualifiers	2015–09–22	Tbilisi	Georgia	2	3–0	
