= Austrian women's football clubs in international competitions =

This is a compilation of the results of the teams representing Austria at official international women's football competitions, that is the UEFA Women's Cup and its successor, the UEFA Women's Champions League.

As of the 2016–17 edition, Austria is ranked 9th in the UWCL's association standings, and it is thus one of twelve associations currently granted two spots in the competition. It has appeared in the quarterfinals once, through Neulengbach in the 2013–14 edition.

== Teams ==
These are the five teams that have represented Austria in the UEFA Women's Cup and the UEFA Women's Champions League.

Club	Founded	State	Location	Appearances	First	Last	Best result
Innsbruck		(Tyrol (federal state)) Tyrol	Innsbruck	1	2002–03	2002–03	6 / 7 - Last 32
Landhaus	1968	Vienna	Vienna	1	2001–02	2001–02	6 / 7 - Last 32
Neulengbach	1996	Lower Austria	Neulengbach	12	2003–04	2014–15	4 / 7 - Quarterfinals
St. Pölten-Spratzern	2006	Lower Austria	Sankt Pölten	4	2013–14	2017–18	6 / 7 - Last 32
Sturm Graz	2011	Styria	Graz	2	2016–17	2017–18	6 / 7 - Last 32

Location of the teams within Austria

== Progression by season ==
Season	Teams	Earlier rounds	Round of 32	Round of 16	Quarterfinals	Semifinals	Final
2001–02 UWC	(Vienna) Landhaus		(Finland) HJK ^{1}				
2002–03 UWC	(Tyrol (federal state)) Innsbruck		(Russia) CSK VVS ^{1}				
2003–04 UWC	(Lower Austria) Neulengbach	(Slovakia) Žiar ^{1}	(Germany) Frankfurt ^{1}				
2004–05 UWC	(Lower Austria) Neulengbach		(France) Montpellier ^{1}				
2005–06 UWC	(Lower Austria) Neulengbach		(Italy) Bardolino ^{1}	(France) Montpellier ^{1}			
2006–07 UWC	(Lower Austria) Neulengbach		(Iceland) Breiðablik ^{1}				
2007–08 UWC	(Lower Austria) Neulengbach		(Scotland) Hibernian ^{1}	(Italy) Bardolino ^{1}			
2008–09 UWC	(Lower Austria) Neulengbach		(Portugal) 1º Dezembro ^{1}	(England) Arsenal ^{1}			
2009–10 UWCL	(Lower Austria) Neulengbach		(Poland) Unia	(Italy) Torres			
2010–11 UWCL	(Lower Austria) Neulengbach		(Greece) PAOK	(Germany) Turbine			
2011–12 UWCL	(Lower Austria) Neulengbach		(Kazakhstan) SShVSM	(Sweden) Malmö			
2012–13 UWCL	(Lower Austria) Neulengbach		(Romania) Olimpia				
2013–14 UWCL	(Lower Austria) Neulengbach		(Cyprus) Apollon	(Turkey) Konak	(Sweden) Tyresö		
2013–14 UWCL	(Lower Austria) Spratzern		(Italy) Torres				
2014–15 UWCL	(Lower Austria) Neulengbach		(Hungary) MTK	(Germany) Wolfsburg			
2015–16 UWCL	(Lower Austria) Spratzern		(Italy) Verona				
2016–17 UWCL	(Lower Austria) Spratzern		(Denmark) Brøndby				
2016–17 UWCL	(Styria) Sturm Graz		(Switzerland) Zürich				
2017–18 UWCL	(Lower Austria) St. Pölten		(England) Manchester				
2017–18 UWCL	(Styria) Sturm Graz	(Cyprus) Apollon ^{1}					

^{1} Group stage. Highest-ranked eliminated team in case of qualification, lowest-ranked qualified team in case of elimination.

== Results by team ==
=== Innsbruck ===
2002–03 UEFA Women's Cup
Round	Opponent	1st	2nd	Agg.	Scorers
Last 32 (group stage)	(Portugal) 1º Dezembro	1–2			Stehrer
Last 32 (group stage)	(Russia) CSK VVS Samara	0–4			
Last 32 (group stage)	(Scotland) Kilmarnock	1–4		0 points	Mircheva

=== Landhaus ===
2001–02 UEFA Women's Cup
Round	Opponent	1st	2nd	Agg.	Scorers
Last 32 (group stage)	(Faroe Islands) KÍ	1–2			Krivohravek
Last 32 (group stage)	(Italy) Torres	0–5			
Last 32 (group stage)	(Finland) HJK (host)	0–8		0 points	

=== Neulengbach ===
2003–04 UEFA Women's Cup
Round	Opponent	1st	2nd	Agg.	Scorers
Qualifiers (group stage)	(Cyprus) PAOK Ledra	14–0			Hufnagl 5 - Gstöttner 3 - Brand 2 - Fischer 2 - Jedlicková - Pötzl
Qualifiers (group stage)	(Slovakia) Žiar nad Hronom	6–3			Gstöttner 4 - Celouch - Jedlicková
Qualifiers (group stage)	(North Macedonia) Lombardini Skopje (host)	7–0		9 points	Gstöttner 3 - Fischer 2 - Brand - Kaspar
Last 32 (group stage)	(Spain) Athletic Bilbao (host)	0–2			
Last 32 (group stage)	(Germany) Frankfurt	1–7			Gstöttner
Last 32 (group stage)	(Portugal) SU 1º Dezembro	1–0		3 points	Pötzl

2004–05 UEFA Women's Cup
Round	Opponent	1st	2nd	Agg.	Scorers
Qualifiers (group stage)	(Portugal) 1º Dezembro	3–1			Celia - Gstöttner - Hufnagl
Qualifiers (group stage)	(France) Montpellier (host)	0–7			
Qualifiers (group stage)	(Republic of Ireland) University College Dublin	4–2		6 points	Brand 2 - Celouch - Gajdosová

2005–06 UEFA Women's Cup
Round	Opponent	1st	2nd	Agg.	Scorers
Qualifiers (group stage)	(Republic of Ireland) University College Dublin	5–1			Burger 2 - Celouch - Gstöttner - Rosana
Qualifiers (group stage)	(Croatia) Dinamo Maksimir (host)	5–1			Celouch 3 - Burger 2
Qualifiers (group stage)	(Italy) Bardolino	0–0		7 points	
Last 16 (group stage)	(Germany) Turbine Potsdam	1–12			Graf
Last 16 (group stage)	(France) Montpellier (host)	0–4			
Last 16 (group stage)	(Netherlands) Saestum	3–4		0 points	Burger 2 - Brand

2006–07 UEFA Women's Cup
Round	Opponent	1st	2nd	Agg.	Scorers
Qualifiers (group stage)	(Northern Ireland) Newtownabbey Strikers	5–1			Burger - Celia - Celouch - Rosana
Qualifiers (group stage)	(Iceland) Breiðablik	0–3			
Qualifiers (group stage)	(Portugal) 1º Dezembro	3–0		6 points	Rosana 2 - Burger

2007–08 UEFA Women's Cup
Round	Opponent	1st	2nd	Agg.	Scorers
Qualifiers (group stage)	(Scotland) Hibernian	4–3			Celouch 2 - Gstöttner - Rosana
Qualifiers (group stage)	(Republic of Ireland) Mayo (host)	3–0			Burger 2 - Novotny
Qualifiers (group stage)	(Poland) Gol Częstochowa	8–1		9 points	Burger 4 - Gstöttner 3 - Faustenhammer
Last 16 (group stage)	(Italy) Bardolino	2–3			Celouch - Gstöttner
Last 16 (group stage)	(England) Arsenal (host)	0–7			
Last 16 (group stage)	(Kazakhstan) Alma	3–0		3 points	Burger 2 - Rosana

2008–09 UEFA Women's Cup
Round	Opponent	1st	2nd	Agg.	Scorers
Qualifiers (group stage)	(Slovenia) Krka	6–0			
Qualifiers (group stage)	(Cyprus) Vamos Idaliou	8–0			
Qualifiers (group stage)	(Portugal) 1º Dezembro	4–0		9 points	
Last 16 (group stage)	(France) Olympique Lyon (host)	0–8			
Last 16 (group stage)	(England) Arsenal	0–6			
Last 16 (group stage)	(Switzerland) Zürich	5–3		3 points	

2009–10 UEFA Women's Champions League
Round	Opponent	1st	2nd	Agg.	Scorers
Last 32	(Poland) Unia Racibórz	a: 3–1	h: 0–1	3–2	Brandtner 2 - Ruiss
Last 16 (group stage)	(Italy) Torres	h: 1–4	a: 1–4	2–8	Burger - Novotny

2010–11 UEFA Women's Champions League
Round	Opponent	1st	2nd	Agg.	Scorers
Last 32	(Greece) PAOK Thessaloniki	a: 0–1	h: 3–0	3–1	Burger 3
Last 16	(Germany) Turbine Potsdam	a: 0–7	h: 0–9	0–16	

2011–12 UEFA Women's Champions League
Round	Opponent	1st	2nd	Agg.	Scorers
Last 32	(Kazakhstan) SShVSM-Kairat	a: 1–2	h: 5–0	6–2	Gstöttner 2 - Burger - Entner - Giovana - Tasch
Last 16	(Sweden) Malmö	h: 1–3	a: 0–1	1–4	Gstöttner

2012–13 UEFA Women's Champions League
Round	Opponent	1st	2nd	Agg.	Scorers
Last 32	(Romania) Olimpia Cluj	a: 1–1	h: 2–2 (aet)	3–3 (agr)	Gstöttner 2 - Giovana

2013–14 UEFA Women's Champions League
Round	Opponent	1st	2nd	Agg.	Scorers
Last 32	(Cyprus) Apollon Limassol	a: 2–1	h: 1–1	3–2	Burger 2 - Bíróová
Last 16	(Turkey) Konak Belediyespor	a: 3–0	h: 3–0	6–0	Burger 4 - Bíróová - Hanschitz
Quarterfinals	(Sweden) Tyresö	a: 1–8	h: 0–0	1–8	Tseng

2014–15 UEFA Women's Champions League
Round	Opponent	1st	2nd	Agg.	Scorers
Last 32	(Hungary) MTK	a: 2–1	h: 2–2 (aet)	4–3	Burger - Tasch - Vojteková - Wasser
Last 16	(Germany) Wolfsburg	h: 0–4	h: 0–7	0–11	

=== St. Pölten-Spratzern ===
2013–14 UEFA Women's Champions League
Round	Opponent	1st	2nd	Agg.	Scorers
Last 32	(Italy) Torres	h: 2–2	a: 1–3	3–5	Billa 2 - Makas

2015–16 UEFA Women's Champions League
Round	Opponent	1st	2nd	Agg.	Scorers
Last 32	(Italy) Verona	h: 4–5	a: 2–2	6–7	Vágó 3 - Pinther - Pöltl - Sipos

2016–17 UEFA Women's Champions League
Round	Opponent	1st	2nd	Agg.	Scorers
Last 32	(Denmark) Brøndby	h: 0–2	a: 2–2	2–4	Pinther - Vágó

2017–18 UEFA Women's Champions League
Round	Opponent	1st	2nd	Agg.	Scorers
Last 32	(England) Manchester City	h: 0–3	a: 0–3	0–6	

=== Sturm Graz ===
2016–17 UEFA Women's Champions League
Round	Opponent	1st	2nd	Agg.	Scorers
Last 32	(Switzerland) Zürich	h: 0–6	a: 0–3	0–9	

2017–18 UEFA Women's Champions League
Round	Opponent	1st	2nd	Agg.	Scorers
Qualifiers (group stage)	(Moldova) Noroc Nimoreni	4–0			Naschenweng 2 – Kofler 2
Qualifiers (group stage)	(Bulgaria) NSA Sofia	3–1			Frieser – Naschenweng – Cancienne
Qualifiers (group stage)	(Cyprus) Apollon Limassol (host)	1–4		6 points	Naschenweng
