= 2016–17 ÖFB-Frauenliga =

ÖFB-Frauenliga
- Season: 2016–17
- Champions: SKN St. Pölten
- UEFA Women's Champions League: SKN St. Pölten, SK Sturm Graz
- Top goalscorer: Fanni Vago (21)

The 2016–17 ÖFB-Frauenliga is the 46th season of the women's football top-level league in Austria. FSK St. Pölten-Spratzern were the defending champion. They renamed to SKN St. Pölten to appeal a broader region and won their third title in a row this season.

== Standings ==
| Pos | Team | Pld | W | D | L | GF | GA | GD | Pts | Qualification or relegation |
|---|---|---|---|---|---|---|---|---|---|---|
| 1 | SKN St. Pölten (C) | 18 | 17 | 1 | 0 | 80 | 8 | +72 | 52 | 2017–18 UEFA Women's Champions League |
| 2 | SK Sturm Graz | 18 | 12 | 3 | 3 | 54 | 18 | +36 | 39 | 2017–18 UEFA Women's Champions League |
| 3 | SV Neulengbach | 18 | 12 | 3 | 3 | 41 | 16 | +25 | 39 | |
| 4 | USC Landhaus Wien | 18 | 10 | 3 | 5 | 43 | 25 | +18 | 33 | |
| 5 | Union Kleinmünchen | 18 | 11 | 0 | 7 | 38 | 30 | +8 | 33 | |
| 6 | SKV Altenmarkt | 18 | 7 | 2 | 9 | 32 | 27 | +5 | 23 | |
| 7 | SG FC Bergheim/USK Hof | 18 | 4 | 5 | 9 | 22 | 39 | −17 | 17 | |
| 8 | DFC LUV Graz | 18 | 2 | 3 | 13 | 11 | 62 | −51 | 9 | |
| 9 | FC Südburgenland | 18 | 2 | 2 | 14 | 11 | 61 | −50 | 8 | |
| 10 | FC Wacker Innsbruck (R) | 18 | 1 | 2 | 15 | 9 | 65 | −56 | 5 | Relegation to 2. Frauenliga |

Source: soccerway.com
Rules for classification: 1) Points; 2) Goal difference; 3) Number of goals scored; 4) Head-to-head points; 5) Head-to-head goal difference; 6) Head-to-head away goals scored
(C) Champions; (R) Relegated

== Top scorers ==
Six players have scored 10 or more goals.

1. Fanny Vágó (SKN St. Pölten Frauen) 21
2. Stefanie Enzinger (SK Sturm Graz) 20
3. Mateja Zver (SKN St. Pölten Frauen) 16
4. Viktoria Pinther (SKN St. Pölten Frauen) 12
5. Christine Schiebinger (SKV Altenmarkt) 11
6. Katharina Elisa Naschenweng (SK Sturm Graz) 10
