= Melanie Brunnthaler =

Austrian footballer

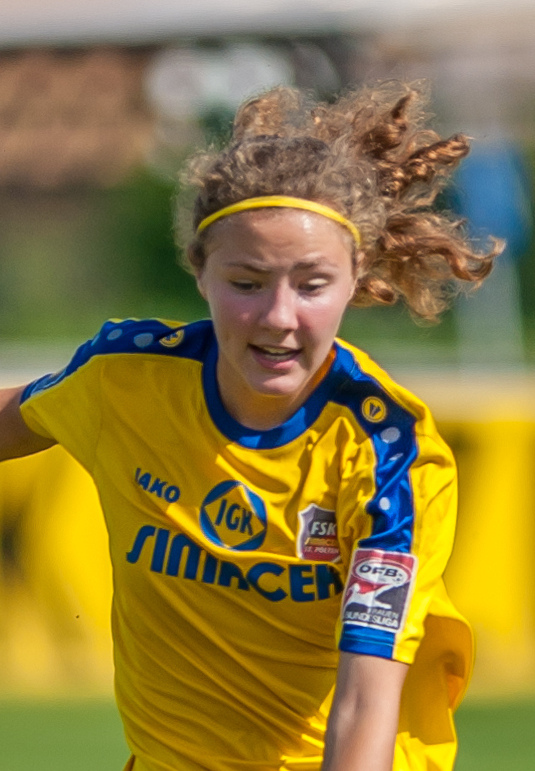
- Brunnthaler in 2016

Personal information
- Date of birth: 28 September 2000 (age 26)
- Place of birth: Hainberg, Austria
- Position: Forward

Team information
- Current team: Hamburger SV
- Number: 11

Youth career
- 2007–2015: ASK-BSC Bruck/Leitha

Senior career*
Years	Team	Apps	(Gls)
2015–2017	FSK St. Pölten-Spratzern	33	(15)
2017–2019	USC Landhaus Wien	33	(16)
2019–2025	SKN St. Pölten	99	(49)
2025–	Hamburger SV	36	(3)

International career^{‡}
2025-	Austria	11	(0)
- * Club domestic league appearances and goals as of 21:30, 21 November 2026 (UTC) ‡ National team caps and goals as of 19:39, 23 June 2026 (UTC)

Melanie Brunnthaler (born 28 September 2000) is an Austrian footballer who plays for Frauen-Bundesliga club Hamburger SV and the Austria women's national football team.

== Club career ==
=== FSK St. Pölten-Spratzern/SKN St. Pölten ===
In 2015, Brunnthaler joined Austrian Frauen Bundesliga club FSK St. Pölten-Spratzern (now known as SKN St. Pölten). She began her career playing in St. Pölten's second team.

=== USC Landhaus Wien ===
In 2017, Brunnthaler joined Frauenliga rivals USC Landhaus Wien.

=== Return to St. Pölten ===
In 2019, Brunnthaler resigned with her first senior club St. Pölten. In April 2023, she extended her contract with St. Pölten until 2024. In May 2024, she further extended her contract with the club until 2026.

Aside from the 2019–20 season (which was cancelled due to the COVID-19 pandemic), Brunnthaler won the Frauenliga title in every season she played with St. Pölten, who were undefeated champions of the league between the 2014–15 and 2024–25 seasons. With St. Pölten, she also won the domestic double (Frauenliga and Frauen Cup) in the 2021–22, 2022–23, 2023–24, and 2024–25 seasons.

=== Hamburger SV ===
In June 2025, Brunnthaler signed with German Frauen-Bundesliga team Hamburger SV, where she reunited with former St. Pölten coach Liese Brancao.

== International career ==
In 2023, Brunnthaler received her first call-up to the senior squad to replace an injured Lisa Kolb.

Brunnthaler was called up again in February 2025 for a pair of Nations League matches against Scotland and Germany. She made her senior debut as a late substitute against Germany on 25 February.

== Career statistics ==
=== Club ===
As of match played 21 November 2026

Appearances and goals by club, season and competition
Club	Season	League (Note: Includes the ÖFB Frauen Bundesliga, 2. Frauen Bundesliga, and Frauen-Bundesliga)			League Cup (Note: Includes the ÖFB Frauen Cup and DFB-Pokal Frauen)		Continental		Total	
Club	Season	Division	Apps	Goals	Apps	Goals	Apps	Goals	Apps	Goals
FSK St. Pölten-Spratzern	2015–16	2. Frauen Bundesliga	20	13	1	0	—		21	13
FSK St. Pölten-Spratzern	2016–17	2. Frauen Bundesliga	13	2	1	0	—		14	2
FSK St. Pölten-Spratzern	Total		33	15	2	0	0	0	35	15
USC Landhaus Wien	2017–18	ÖFB Frauen Bundesliga	15	7	2	1	—		17	8
USC Landhaus Wien	2018–19	ÖFB Frauen Bundesliga	18	9	5	5	—		23	14
USC Landhaus Wien	Total		33	16	7	6	0	0	40	22
SKN St. Pölten	2019–20	ÖFB Frauen Bundesliga	11	7	1	1	—		12	8
SKN St. Pölten	2020–21	ÖFB Frauen Bundesliga	16	8	—		—		16	8
SKN St. Pölten	2021–22	ÖFB Frauen Bundesliga	17	10	4	3	—		21	13
SKN St. Pölten	2022–23	ÖFB Frauen Bundesliga	15	6	5	2	10	2	30	10
SKN St. Pölten	2023–24	ÖFB Frauen Bundesliga	16	10	5	2	9	0	30	12
SKN St. Pölten	2024–25	ÖFB Frauen Bundesliga	24	8	4	4	10	1	38	13
SKN St. Pölten	Total		99	49	19	12	29	3	147	64
Hamburger SV	2025–26	Frauen-Bundesliga	25	3	2	0	—		27	3
Hamburger SV	2026–27	Frauen-Bundesliga	11	0	2	0	—		13	0
Hamburger SV	Total		36	3	4	0	0	0	39	3
Career total			201	83	32	18	29	3	262	104

== Honours ==
- ÖFB Frauen Bundesliga: 2020–21, 2021–22, 2022–23, 2023–24, 2024–25
- ÖFB Frauen Cup: 2022, 2023, 2024, 2025
