= Manuela Zinsberger =

Austrian footballer (born 1995)

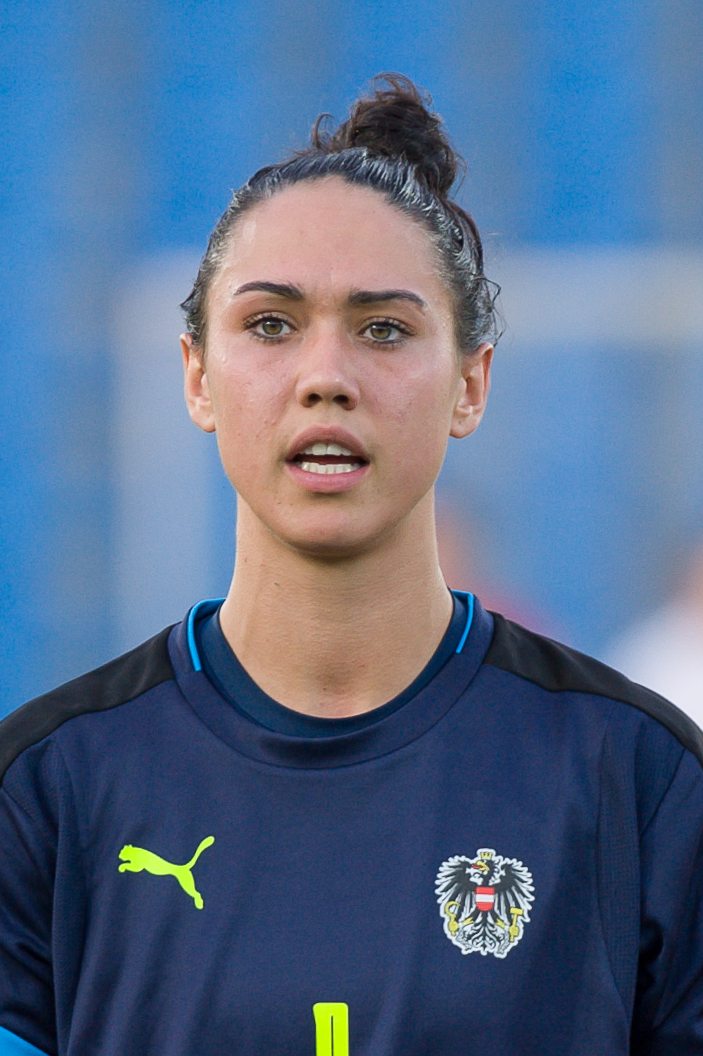
- Zinsberger in 2017

Personal information
- Date of birth: 19 October 1995 (age 31)
- Place of birth: Stockerau, Austria
- Height: 1.77 m (5 ft 10 in)
- Position: Goalkeeper

Team information
- Current team: Borussia Dortmund
- Number: 24

Youth career
- 2001–2009: USV Leitzersdorf
- 2009–2010: SV Stockerau
- 2010: USV Großrußbach

Senior career*
Years	Team	Apps	(Gls)
2010–2014	SV Neulengbach	14	(1)
2014	Bayern Munich II	5	(0)
2014–2019	Bayern Munich	55	(0)
2019–2026	Arsenal	88	(0)
2026–	Borussia Dortmund	0	(0)

International career^{‡}
2010–2011	Austria U-17	6	(0)
2011–2013	Austria U-19	7	(0)
2013–	Austria	109	(0)
- * Club domestic league appearances and goals as of 10 May 2025 ‡ National team caps and goals as of 20 May 2025

Manuela Zinsberger (Austrian German: [manuˈeːla ˈtsɪnsˌbɛrɡɐ]; born 19 October 1995) is an Austrian professional footballer who plays as a goalkeeper for German club Borussia Dortmund and the Austria national team.

== Life ==
Zinsberger grew up in the village of Niederhollabrunn in Lower Austria. She was first trained at the LAZ Stockerau and from 2009 at the AKA St. Pölten. From the 2011/12 school year she moved to the newly established National Center for Women's Football in St. Pölten.

In 2017 she was named Austrian of the Year by Die Presse in the international success category. In December 2020 at age 25, she was named Austria's Footballer of the Year by the Austria Press Agency, being the first goalkeeper to win Footballer of the Year.

== Club career ==
=== Youth clubs ===
In her youth, Zinsberger played for USV Leitzersdorf and SV Stockerau.

=== USVG Großrußbach ===
In the winter transition period 2009–10, Zinsberger switched for the first time to adult football for USVG Großrußbach in the Lower Austrian state league. She made her debut on 21 March 2010 in a game against Maria Anzbach. In the nine championship games she was able to keep five clean sheets.

=== SV Neulengbach ===
In the summer of 2010, she moved to ÖFB-Frauenliga club SV Neulengbach and made her debut on 30 October 2010 (9th matchday) – shortly after her 15th birthday – in a 1–1 draw at home against FC Südburgenland. At the same time she played for the Neulengbach Juniors in the 2nd division East/South until 2013. Since the 2012–13 season she was the first-choice goalkeeper at SV Neulengbach.

=== Bayern Munich ===
On 27 June 2014, Zinsberger signed a three-year contract with Bayern Munich. She made her debut for Bayern Munich on 21 September 2014 (third matchday), when she won 4–1 with the second team in the away game against ETSV Würzburg. For the first team she completed her first Bundesliga game on 30 November 2014 (11th matchday) in a goalless draw away against SGS Essen. On 18 February 2017 (matchday 12) she saved a penalty taken by Carolin Schiewe in the 74th minute in the away game against SC Freiburg and secured a 3–2 victory for her team. On 26 February 2017 (matchday 13), her team won 2–1 with two goals from Vivianne Miedema, who came on as a substitute in the 60th minute. On 2 April 2019, it was announced that Zinsberger would not renew her contract and would leave the club at her own request in the summer. For the 2019–20 season, she was signed by English Premier League club Arsenal.

=== Arsenal ===
After moving to Arsenal WFC, Zinsberger quickly established herself as a first-choice goalkeeper and played six times in her first twelve games and conceded only 11 goals. On 17 November 2019, she was also part of the London derby victory between Arsenal and Chelsea, who celebrated a record crowd of 38,262 in the English Women's Super League. Arsenal won 2–0 away, Zinsberger not conceding a goal in the record game. In the 2019–20 UEFA Women's Champions League she played in a round of 16 game before the Covid break and in the quarter-finals after the break. The quarterfinals against Paris Saint-Germain was then lost 1–2. Third in the 2020–21 FA WSL, Arsenal had to qualify for the 2021–22 UEFA Women's Champions League via the placement route, which included wins against Oqshetpes Kokshetau (4–0), PSV Eindhoven (3–1), and Slavia Prague (3–0 and 4–0), where she was in goal three times. In the group stage, she played in the home win against Hoffenheim (4–0) and in the two defeats against defending champions FC Barcelona (4–1 and 4–0). Second behind Barcelona thanks to the better goal difference over Hoffenheim, they reached the quarter-finals. Here she played in the two games against VfL Wolfsburg. After a 1–1 draw at home, they lost 2–0 in Wolfsburg. Arsenal finished the 2021–22 season as runners-up. Zinsberger made 20 appearances and was on the bench twice. On 5 February 2021 Zinsberger signed a long-term contract with Arsenal keeping her with the club until 2023. Zinsberger won the 2021–22 FA WSL Golden Glove with 13 clean sheets.

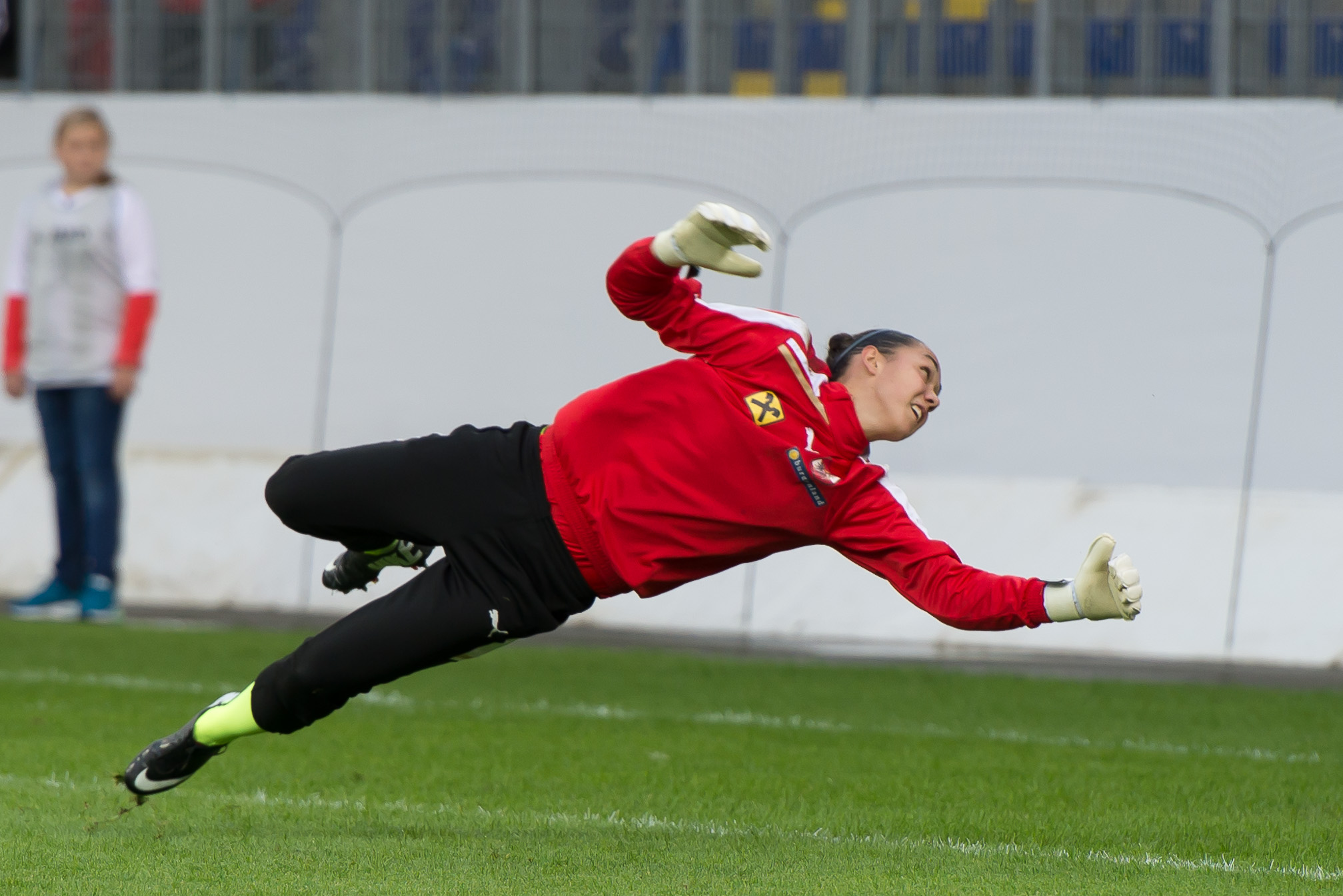
Manuela Zinsberger in the 2015 World Cup: Qualifying Round

After Arsenal won the 2023 Conti Cup, Zinsberger said she expected this to be the first of many more trophies. During the match, Zinsberger had three stoppages due to injury, infuriating Chelsea manager Emma Hayes, who following the match, stated that she wanted these to be clamped down on. In the 2023 UEFA Women's Champions League campaign, Zinsberger was a key part of the team during the matches, making 11 appearances, and they made it to the semi final before being knocked out by eventual winners Wolfsburg. In March 2023, Zinsberger extended her contract for another season, saying it wasn't a tough decision. During the 2022–23 Women's Super League season, Zinsberger made 18 appearances and had 10 clean sheets.

During the 2023–24 Women's Super League season, Zinsberger made 18 appearances and had 5 clean sheets.

In January 2024, Zinsberger signed a 2-year contract extension, after 113 appearances and 49 clean sheets since joining the club in 2019. She said that she is still not done with her Arsenal career. Ahead of the 2024–25 Women's Super League season, Daphne van Domselaar, was signed from Aston Villa, and is set to compete with Zinsberger for the no.1 goalkeeper spot.

On 17 October 2025, Arsenal announced that Zinsberger had ruptured her anterior cruciate ligament in a training session before Arsenal's game against Benfica in the Women's Champions League, meaning Zinsberger would miss the rest of the season.

On 23 April 2026, Arsenal announced that Zinsberger would be leaving the club after 7 years, at the end of the 2025–26 season.

=== Borussia Dortmund ===
On 12 June 2026, Zinsberger signed for Borussia Dortmund on a free transfer, agreeing a contract until 2029.

== International career ==
After Zinsberger had played international matches for the U-17 and U-19 national teams, she was called into the senior Austria national team for the first time on 2 June 2013, for a fixture against neighbours Slovenia in Radlje ob Dravi. Aged 17, she played the second half of Austria's 3–1 win, substituted in the 46th minute for Anna-Carina Kristler, to gain her first senior cap. At the 2014 Algarve Cup, she featured in the 2–0 defeat by North Korea on 7 March, and in the 2–1 win over Portugal on 12 March. She played three qualifiers for the 2015 World Cup in Canada: the 3–0 win on 26 October 2013 in Budapest against Hungary, as well as the two 1–3 defeats against France on 31 October 2013 in Ritzing and on 9 April 2014 in Le Mans.

In March 2016, she won the Cyprus Cup with Austria as the first entrant. With the senior national team, she finished the 2nd qualifying round for the 2017 European Championships as runners-up in Group 8 behind Norway and qualified for the first time in a major tournament. She got playing time in all three group stage matches, against Switzerland, France, and Iceland, as well as in the quarter-final against Spain, where she played an important role in winning the decisive penalty shootout. The team reached the semi-finals of the Euro 2017, where they lost to Denmark on penalties.

In qualifying for the 2019 World Cup, Zinsberger featured in all eight matches, keeping four clean sheets. The Austrians finished second in the group behind Spain, but missed the playoffs for the last place at the World Cup as the worst second in the group.

In qualifying for the Euro 2022, she played in all eight games and only conceded goals in the 0–3 away defeat against France. As the third-best third-placed team, the Austrians qualified for the finals of the European Championship for the second time, where they played the opening game against hosts England. With the finals being postponed by a year due to COVID-19, the first eight matches of qualifying for the 2023 World Cup took place before the finals, in which she played seven times and didn't concede a goal three times. On 27 June 2022, she was nominated for the European Championship finals.

In Austria's 1–0 defeat to England in the UEFA European Championship 2022 opening game, Zinsberger was admired for her friendliness to Arsenal teammate Beth Mead after Mead had scored the winning goal for England.

In June 2024, Zinsberger had to leave international duty, due to personal reasons. This came not long after her wife, announced on Instagram they were expecting a baby soon. On 16 July 2024, Zinsberger earned her 100th cap for Austria in a 4–0 defeat to Germany.

== Personal life ==
On 7 March 2022, Zinsberger announced her engagement with girlfriend Madeleine; they married on 9 June 2023. On 25 December 2023, they announced via Instagram that they were expecting a child in June 2024. On 1 July 2024, Zinsberger and her wife announced the birth of their son, Marvis, via Instagram.

== Career statistics ==
=== Club ===
As of match played 10 May 2025

Appearances and goals by club, season and competition
Club	Season	League			National cup		League cup		UWCL		Total	
Club	Season	Division	Apps	Goals	Apps	Goals	Apps	Goals	Apps	Goals	Apps	Goals
Bayern Munich	2014-15	Frauen-Bundesliga	3	0	—		—		—		3	0
Bayern Munich	2015-16	Frauen-Bundesliga	4	0	—		—		—		4	0
Bayern Munich	2016–17	Frauen-Bundesliga	10	0	1	0	—		1	0	12	0
Bayern Munich	2017-18	Frauen-Bundesliga	20	0	3	0	—		2	0	25	0
Bayern Munich	2018–19	Frauen-Bundesliga	18	0	3	0	—		6	0	27	0
Bayern Munich	Total		55	0	7	0	—		9	0	71	0
Arsenal	2019-20	Women's Super League	12	0	—		4	0	2	0	18	0
Arsenal	2020–21	Women's Super League	13	0	—		1	0	—		14	0
Arsenal	2021–22	Women's Super League	20	0	2	0	1	0	8	0	31	0
Arsenal	2022–23	Women's Super League	18	0	1	0	1	0	11	0	31	0
Arsenal	2023–24	Women's Super League	18	0	1	0	3	0	2	0	24	0
Arsenal	2024–25	Women's Super League	7	0	2	0	1	0	8	0	18	0
Arsenal	Total		88	0	6	0	11	0	31	0	136	0
Career total			143	0	13	0	11	0	40	0	207	0

=== International ===
Statistics accurate as of match played 8 April 2025.

Appearances and goals by national team and year
National team	Year	Apps	Goals
Austria	2014	2	0
Austria	2015	4	0
Austria	2016	4	0
Austria	2017	21	0
Austria	2018	6	0
Austria	2019	13	0
Austria	2020	2	0
Austria	2021	2	0
Austria	2022	16	0
Austria	2023	18	0
Austria	2024	10	0
Austria	2025	4	0
Total		102	0

== Honours ==
SV Neulengbach

- ÖFB-Frauenliga: 2010, 2011, 2012, 2013
- ÖFB Cup: 2010, 2011, 2012

Bayern München

- Bundesliga: 2014–15, 2015–16
- DFB Cup runner-up: 2018

Arsenal

- FA Women's League Cup: 2022–23, 2023–24
- Women's Super League runner-up: 2021-22
- Women's FA Cup runner-up: 2020–21
- UEFA Women's Champions League: 2024–25

Austria

- Cyprus Cup: 2016

Personal

- Austrian of the year in the International Success category 2017
- Austrian Sportswoman of the Year 2017
- Austria's Footballer of the Year (APA) 2020
- Women's Super League Golden Glove: 2021–22

== See also ==
- List of women's footballers with 100 or more international caps
