= Laura Wienroither =

Austrian association football player

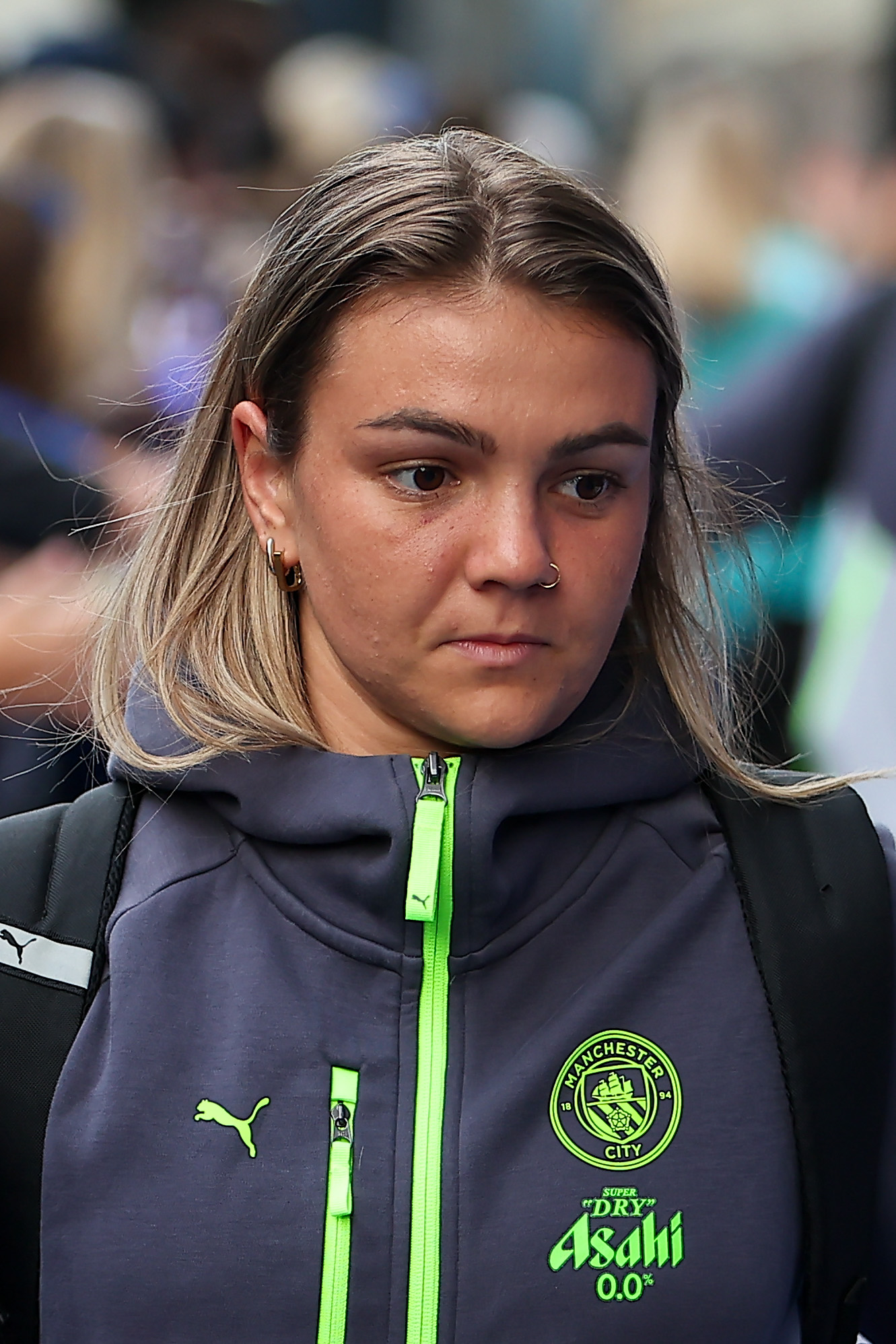
- Wienroither in 2025

Personal information
- Date of birth: 13 January 1999 (age 27)
- Place of birth: Vöcklabruck, Austria
- Height: 1.65 m (5 ft 5 in)
- Position: Right-back

Team information
- Current team: Manchester City
- Number: 13

Youth career
- 2007–2013: TSV Frankenburg
- 2017: SV Neulengbach

Senior career*
Years	Team	Apps	(Gls)
2013–2014	Union Kleinmünchen II		
2014–2016	Union Kleinmünchen		
2016–2017	SV Neulengbach		
2017–2018	SKN St. Pölten		
2018–2022	TSG Hoffenheim II	18	(2)
2019–2022	TSG Hoffenheim	40	(1)
2022–2025	Arsenal	30	(1)
2025	→ Manchester City (loan)	5	(0)
2025–	Manchester City	1	(0)

International career^{‡}
2014–2016	Austria U17	19	(1)
2015	Austria U16	3	(1)
2016–2018	Austria U19	19	(4)
2019–	Austria	46	(2)
- * Club domestic league appearances and goals as of 18:19, 4 June 2026 (UTC) ‡ National team caps and goals as of 08:12, 14 October 2026 (UTC)

Laura Wienroither (Austrian German: [ˈlaʊra ˈviːnroːtɐ]; born 13 January 1999) is an Austrian professional footballer who plays as a right-back for Women's Super League club Manchester City and the Austria national team.

== Club career ==
=== Union Kleinmünchen ===
Wienroither began her senior career in 2014, at just 15 years old, playing for ÖFB Frauen Bundesliga (Austrian Bundesliga) club Union Kleinmünchen. Having previously spent time in the reserve team, she would remain with the senior team until her departure in 2016.

=== SV Neulengbach ===
In the summer of 2016, Wienroither joined fellow ÖFB Frauen Bundesliga club SV Neulenghbach. She made 29 appearances for the club.

=== SKN St. Pölten ===
Wienroither joined SKN St. Pölten ahead of the 2017–18 season; during her time with the club, she won both the ÖFB Frauen Bundesliga league and ÖFB Ladies Cup competitions. During her time in St. Pölten, Wienroither attended Bundes Oberstufen Real Gymnasium (BORG), a federal upper-level school, and the Austrian Football Association's National Centre for Women's Football.

=== TSG 1899 Hoffenheim ===
In 2018, she transferred to German Frauen-Bundesliga club TSG 1899 Hoffenheim. She began her time with the club playing in the reserve team; her first team debut came in February 2019.

=== Arsenal ===
On 15 January 2022, Wienroither joined Women's Super League team Arsenal for an undisclosed fee.

In May 2023, Wienroither suffered a ruptured ACL just 18 minutes after being subbed on in during the 2nd leg of Arsenal's 2022-23 UEFA Champions League semi-final game against VfL Wolfsburg. Her injury was the club's fourth ACL injury that season after Beth Mead, Vivianne Miedema, and Leah Williamson.

Wienroither made her return from injury 328 days later against Bristol City as an 80th-minute substitute for Emily Fox.

=== Manchester City ===
On 30 January 2025, it was announced that Wienroither would join Manchester City on loan for the remainder of the 2024–25 season. She made five league appearances (eight across all competitions) during her loan spell.

On 15 August 2025, it was announced that Wienroither would be making the move permanent, leaving Arsenal just a year after renewing her contract at the North London club. Her contract with Manchester City will expire in 2027.

In the 2025–26 season, Wienroither made just three appearances for City across all competitions. She suffered an ankle injury in April 2026 which kept her out of the squad for two of City's final three games in their Women's Super League winning campaign. Wienroither also won the Women's FA Cup with Manchester City, despite not appearing in any of the matches in the competition.

== International career ==
Wienroither played for Austria's U16, U17 and U19 national teams; she made a total of 41 appearances across all youth age groups.

She made her debut for the senior national team in March 2018, coming on as a second-half substitute against Wales in the Cyprus Cup. Her first senior goal came in February 2022 during a 6–1 victory over Romania.

Wienroither was part of the squad that was called up to the 2022 Women's Euros. Austria finished second in their group (behind eventual champions England), and were knocked out of the competition by Germany in the quarter-finals. Austria did not qualify for either the 2023 Women's World Cup or the 2025 Women's Euros.

== Career statistics ==
=== International ===
As of match played 13 October 2026

Appearances and goals by national team and year
National team	Year	Apps	Goals
Austria	2018	1	0
Austria	2019	3	0
Austria	2020	4	0
Austria	2021	9	0
Austria	2022	13	1
Austria	2023	3	1
Austria	2024	5	0
Austria	2025	7	0
Austria	2026	1	0
Total		46	2

Scores and results list Austria's goal tally first, score column indicates score after each Wienroither goal.

List of international goals scored by Laura Wienroither
No.	Date	Venue	Opponent	Score	Result	Competition
1	20 February 2022	Marbella Football Center, Marbella, Spain	Romania	2–0	6–1	Friendly
2	7 April 2023	Stadion Wiener Neustadt, Wiener Neustadt, Austria	Belgium	3–2	3–2	Friendly

== Honours ==
St. Pölten

- ÖFB-Frauenliga: 2017–18
- ÖFB Ladies Cup: 2017–18

Arsenal

- FA Women's League Cup: 2022–23, 2023–24

=== Manchester City ===
- Women's Super League: 2025–26
- Adobe Women's FA Cup: 2025–26

Individual

- Arsenal Player of the Month: November 2022
