= Aldijana Mašinović =

Bosnia and Herzegovina footballer

Personal information
- Date of birth: 3 July 1998 (age 28)
- Position: Midfielder

Team information
- Current team: Neulengbach
- Number: 11

Senior career*
Years	Team	Apps	(Gls)
2014–2017	Baden Casino	59	(88)
2018–	Neulengbach	45	(5)
2019–	Neulengbach II	16	(11)

International career^{‡}
2020–	Bosnia and Herzegovina	2+	(0+)
- * Club domestic league appearances and goals as of 29 May 2021. ‡ National team caps and goals as of 11 June 2021.

Aldijana Mašinović (born 3 July 1998) is a Bosnia and Herzegovina footballer who plays as a midfielder for Austrian ÖFB-Frauenliga club SV Neulengbach and the Bosnia and Herzegovina women's national team.

== Club career ==
Mašinović has played for Baden Casino and Neulengbach in Austria.

== International career ==
Mašinović made her senior debut for Bosnia and Herzegovina on 22 January 2020 as a 66th-minute substitution in a 3–2 friendly away win over Montenegro.
