= 2023–24 Arsenal W.F.C. season =

English women's football club season

Arsenal Women
2023–24 season
- Owner: Kroenke Sports & Entertainment
- Manager: Jonas Eidevall
- Stadium: Meadow Park; Emirates Stadium (Select home games)
- Super League: 3rd
- FA Cup: Fifth round
- League Cup: Winners
- Champions League: First qualifying round
- Top goalscorer: League: Alessia Russo (12); All: Stina Blackstenius (18)
- Highest home attendance: 60,160 (vs Manchester United, 17 February 2024) at Emirates Stadium
- Lowest home attendance: 3,453 (vs Manchester City, 5 November 2023) at Meadow Park
- Average home league attendance: 29,999
- Biggest win: 6–0 (vs Reading (A), League Cup, 24 January 2024)
- Biggest defeat: 1–3 (vs Chelsea (A), WSL, 15 March 2024)
Home colours	Third colours
- All statistics correct as of 18 May 2024.

The 2023–24 season was Arsenal Women's Football Club's 37th season of competitive football. The club participated in the Women's Super League, the qualifying rounds of the Champions League and the FA Cup. They also won the League Cup for the second consecutive season and 7th time overall. The club played five league matches at Emirates Stadium, two more than in the 2022–23 season.

== Squad information and statistics ==
=== First team squad ===
No.	Name	Date of birth (age)	Since	Last Contract	Signed from
Goalkeepers
1	(Austria) Manuela Zinsberger	19 October 1995 (aged 28)	2019	January 2024	(Germany) Bayern Munich
14	(Canada) Sabrina D'Angelo	11 May 1993 (aged 31)	2023	January 2023	(Sweden) Vittsjö GIK
40	(England) Naomi Williams	24 October 2004 (aged 19)	2023	June 2023	(England) Arsenal Academy
Defenders
2	(United States) Emily Fox	5 July 1998 (aged 25)	2024	January 2024	(United States) North Carolina Courage
3	(England) Lotte Wubben-Moy	11 January 1999 (aged 25)	2020	September 2020	(United States) University of North Carolina
6	(England) Leah Williamson	29 March 1997 (aged 27)	2014	June 2021	(England) Arsenal Academy
7	(Australia) Steph Catley	26 January 1994 (aged 30)	2020	June 2023	(Australia) Melbourne City
15	(Republic of Ireland) Katie McCabe	21 September 1995 (aged 28)	2015	September 2023	(Republic of Ireland) Shelbourne
26	(Austria) Laura Wienroither	13 January 1999 (aged 25)	2022	January 2022	(Germany) TSG Hoffenheim
27	(Spain) Laia Codina	22 January 2000 (aged 24)	2023	August 2023	(Spain) Barcelona
28	(Sweden) Amanda Ilestedt	17 January 1993 (aged 31)	2023	June 2023	(France) Paris Saint-Germain
29	(England) Teyah Goldie	27 June 2004 (aged 20)	2021	June 2022	(England) Arsenal Academy
Midfielders
10	(Scotland) Kim Little (c)	29 June 1990 (aged 34)	2016	April 2023	(United States) Seattle Reign
12	(Norway) Frida Maanum	16 July 1999 (aged 24)	2021	June 2023	(Sweden) Linköpings FC
13	(Switzerland) Lia Wälti	19 April 1993 (aged 31)	2018	May 2023	(Germany) Turbine Potsdam
21	(Netherlands) Victoria Pelova	3 June 1999 (aged 25)	2023	January 2023	(Netherlands) Ajax
22	(Denmark) Kathrine Møller Kühl	5 July 2003 (aged 20)	2023	January 2023	(Denmark) Nordsjælland
32	(Australia) Kyra Cooney-Cross	15 February 2002 (aged 22)	2023	September 2023	(Sweden) Hammarby IF
Forwards
9	(England) Beth Mead	9 May 1995 (aged 29)	2017	December 2022	(England) Sunderland
11	(Netherlands) Vivianne Miedema	15 July 1996 (aged 27)	2017	May 2022	(Germany) Bayern Munich
17	(Sweden) Lina Hurtig	5 September 1995 (aged 28)	2022	August 2022	(Italy) Juventus
19	(Australia) Caitlin Foord	11 November 1994 (aged 29)	2020	June 2023	(Australia) Sydney FC
20	(Brazil) Giovana Queiroz	21 June 2003 (aged 21)	2022	September 2022	(Spain) Barcelona
23	(England) Alessia Russo	8 February 1999 (aged 25)	2023	July 2023	(England) Manchester United
24	(Canada) Cloé Lacasse	7 July 1993 (aged 30)	2023	June 2023	(Portugal) Benfica
25	(Sweden) Stina Blackstenius	5 February 1996 (aged 28)	2022	January 2022	(Sweden) BK Häcken

=== Statistics ===
Statistics as of 18 May 2024.

==== Appearances and goals ====
No.	Name	Super League		FA Cup		League Cup		UWCL		Total	
No.	Name	Apps	Goals	Apps	Goals	Apps	Goals	Apps	Goals	Apps	Goals
Goalkeepers
1	(Austria) Manuela Zinsberger	18	0	1	0	3	0	2	0	24	0
14	(Canada) Sabrina D'Angelo	4	0	1	0	4	0	0	0	9	0
40	(England) Naomi Williams	0	0	0	0	0	0	0	0	0	0
Defenders
2	(United States) Emily Fox	9+1	0	2	0	1	0	0	0	12+1	0
3	(England) Lotte Wubben-Moy	17+1	1	2	0	4	1	2	0	25+1	2
5	(Scotland) Jen Beattie	2+1	0	0	0	4	0	0+2	1	6+3	1
6	(England) Leah Williamson	8+1	0	1	0	2+1	0	0	0	11+2	0
7	(Australia) Steph Catley	17+5	1	0+1	0	4+3	0	1+1	0	22+10	1
15	(Republic of Ireland) Katie McCabe	19+2	3	2	0	6+1	0	1+1	0	28+4	3
16	(Switzerland) Noelle Maritz	4+4	0	0	0	3	0	2	0	9+4	0
26	(Austria) Laura Wienroither	0+4	0	0	0	0	0	0	0	0+4	0
27	(Spain) Laia Codina	5+3	0	0+2	0	4+2	1	0	0	9+7	1
28	(Sweden) Amanda Ilestedt	10+2	1	1	1	0+2	1	2	0	13+4	3
29	(England) Teyah Goldie	0	0	0	0	0	0	0	0	0	0
62	(England) Katie Reid	0+1	0	0	0	0	0	0	0	0+1	0
Midfielders
10	(Scotland) Kim Little (c)	14+3	1	0+1	0	2+2	1	2	0	18+6	2
12	(Norway) Frida Maanum	7+14	3	1+1	1	6+1	4	2	0	16+16	8
13	(Switzerland) Lia Wälti	13+2	0	1+1	1	3	0	2	0	19+3	1
21	(Netherlands) Victoria Pelova	20+2	2	2	0	3+3	0	0+2	0	25+7	2
22	(Denmark) Kathrine Møller Kühl	0+2	0	0	0	3	0	0+1	0	3+3	0
32	(Australia) Kyra Cooney-Cross	5+9	0	1+1	0	4+3	0	0	0	10+13	0
Forwards
9	(England) Beth Mead	16+4	8	2	0	3+3	1	0	0	21+7	9
11	(Netherlands) Vivianne Miedema	3+6	2	1	0	1+3	0	0	0	5+9	2
17	(Sweden) Lina Hurtig	0+2	1	0	0	2	0	0+2	1	2+4	2
19	(Australia) Caitlin Foord	18+4	4	2	0	2+5	1	2	1	24+9	6
23	(England) Alessia Russo	20+2	12	2	1	2+3	1	1+1	2	25+6	16
24	(Canada) Cloé Lacasse	6+13	3	0+1	0	5+1	2	2	0	13+15	5
25	(Sweden) Stina Blackstenius	7+12	7	0+2	1	6	9	1+1	1	14+15	18
53	(England) Vivienne Lia	0	0	0	0	0+2	0	0	0	0+2	0
59	(England) Michelle Agyemang	0+1	0	0	0	0	0	0	0	0+1	0

==== Goalscorers ====
Rank	No.	Position	Name	Super League	FA Cup	League Cup	UWCL	Total
1	25	FW	(Sweden) Stina Blackstenius	7	1	9	1	18
2	23	FW	(England) Alessia Russo	12	1	1	2	16
3	9	FW	(England) Beth Mead	8	0	1	0	9
4	12	MF	(Norway) Frida Maanum	3	1	4	0	8
5	19	FW	(Australia) Caitlin Foord	4	0	1	1	6
6	24	FW	(Canada) Cloé Lacasse	3	0	2	0	5
7	15	DF	(Republic of Ireland) Katie McCabe	3	0	0	0	3
7	28	DF	(Sweden) Amanda Ilestedt	1	1	1	0	3
9	3	DF	(England) Lotte Wubben-Moy	1	0	1	0	2
9	10	MF	(Scotland) Kim Little	1	0	1	0	2
9	11	FW	(Netherlands) Vivianne Miedema	2	0	0	0	2
9	17	FW	(Sweden) Lina Hurtig	1	0	0	1	2
9	21	MF	(Netherlands) Victoria Pelova	2	0	0	0	2
14	5	DF	(Scotland) Jen Beattie	0	0	0	1	1
14	7	DF	(Australia) Steph Catley	1	0	0	0	1
14	13	MF	(Switzerland) Lia Wälti	0	1	0	0	1
14	27	DF	(Spain) Laia Codina	0	0	1	0	1
Own goal				4	0	1	0	5
Total				53	5	23	6	87

==== Disciplinary record ====
Rank	No.	Position	Name	Super League		FA Cup		League Cup		UWCL		Total	
Rank	No.	Position	Name	Booked	Sent off (straight red)	Booked	Sent off (straight red)	Booked	Sent off (straight red)	Booked	Sent off (straight red)	Booked	Sent off (straight red)
1	15	DF	(Republic of Ireland) Katie McCabe	8	0	0	0	0	0	2	0	10	0
2	3	DF	(England) Lotte Wubben-Moy	4	0	1	0	0	0	0	0	5	0
2	24	FW	(Canada) Cloé Lacasse	5	0	0	0	0	0	0	0	5	0
4	19	FW	(Australia) Caitlin Foord	4	0	0	0	0	0	0	0	4	0
5	21	MF	(Netherlands) Victoria Pelova	3	0	0	0	0	0	0	0	3	0
6	7	DF	(Australia) Steph Catley	0	0	0	0	1	0	1	0	2	0
6	13	MF	(Switzerland) Lia Wälti	2	0	0	0	0	0	0	0	2	0
6	23	FW	(England) Alessia Russo	2	0	0	0	0	0	0	0	2	0
9	5	DF	(Scotland) Jen Beattie	0	0	0	0	1	0	0	0	1	0
9	9	FW	(England) Beth Mead	0	0	1	0	0	0	0	0	1	0
9	10	MF	(Scotland) Kim Little	1	0	0	0	0	0	0	0	1	0
9	12	MF	(Norway) Frida Maanum	1	0	0	0	0	0	0	0	1	0
9	16	DF	(Switzerland) Noelle Maritz	1	0	0	0	0	0	0	0	1	0
9	17	FW	(Sweden) Lina Hurtig	0	0	0	0	0	0	1	0	1	0
9	32	MF	(Australia) Kyra Cooney-Cross	1	0	0	0	0	0	0	0	1	0
Total				32	0	2	0	2	0	4	0	40	0

==== Clean sheets ====
Rank	No.	Name	Super League	FA Cup	League Cup	UWCL	Total
1	1	(Austria) Manuela Zinsberger	5	0	3	1	9
2	14	(Canada) Sabrina D'Angelo	2	0	1	0	3
Total			7	0	3	1	11

== Transfers, loans and other signings ==
=== Transfers in ===
Announcement date	No.	Position	Player	From club
27 June 2023	28	DF	(Sweden) Amanda Ilestedt	(France) Paris Saint-Germain
29 June 2023	24	FW	(Canada) Cloé Lacasse	(Portugal) Benfica
4 July 2023	23	FW	(England) Alessia Russo	(England) Manchester United
29 August 2023	27	DF	(Spain) Laia Codina	(Spain) Barcelona
15 September 2023	32	MF	(Australia) Kyra Cooney-Cross	(Sweden) Hammarby IF
11 January 2024	2	DF	(United States) Emily Fox	(United States) North Carolina Courage
30 January 2024	86	GK	(France) Sarah Bouhaddi	(France) Paris Saint-Germain

=== Contract extensions ===
Announcement date	No.	Position	Player	At Arsenal since
1 June 2023	12	MF	(Norway) Frida Maanum	2021
6 June 2023	7	DF	(Australia) Steph Catley	2020
8 June 2023	19	FW	(Australia) Caitlin Foord	2020
30 June 2023	5	DF	(Scotland) Jen Beattie	2019
29 September 2023	15	DF	(Republic of Ireland) Katie McCabe	2015
19 January 2024	1	GK	(Austria) Manuela Zinsberger	2019

=== Transfers out ===
Announcement date	No.	Position	Player	To club
27 May 2023	2	DF	(Brazil) Rafaelle Souza	(United States) Orlando Pride
13 June 2023	24	GK	(England) Fran Stenson	(England) Sheffield United
14 June 2023	23	FW	(Japan) Mana Iwabuchi	Retired
11 July 2023	4	DF	(England) Anna Patten	(England) Aston Villa
28 September 2023	27	FW	(England) Jodie Taylor	Retired
6 January 2024	16	DF	(Switzerland) Noelle Maritz	(England) Aston Villa
2 February 2024	5	DF	(Scotland) Jen Beattie	(United States) Bay FC
25 March 2024	86	GK	(France) Sarah Bouhaddi	Unattached

=== Loans out ===
Announcement date	No.	Position	Player	To club
28 July 2023	56	MF	(England) Freya Godfrey	(England) Charlton Athletic
2 August 2023	18	GK	(United States) Kaylan Marckese	(England) Bristol City
13 January 2024	22	MF	(Denmark) Kathrine Møller Kühl	(England) Everton
25 January 2024	20	FW	(Brazil) Giovana Queiroz	(Spain) Madrid CFF

== Suspensions ==
No.	Position	Player	Games suspended	Reason
15	DF	(Republic of Ireland) Katie McCabe	v. West Ham United, 4 February 2024	Yellow card accumulation
24	FW	(Canada) Cloé Lacasse	v. Brighton & Hove Albion, 18 May 2024	Yellow card accumulation

== Club ==
=== Kits ===
Supplier: Adidas / Sponsor: Fly Emirates / Sleeve sponsor: Visit Rwanda

Home	Home alt. 1	Home alt. 2	Home (2024-25)	Away (Women)	"No More Red"	Goalkeeper^{1}	Goalkeeper^{2}	Goalkeeper^{3} alt.	Goalkeeper (2024-25)

==== Outfield kit usage ====
Kit	Combination	Usage	
Home	Red body; White sleeves; White sorts; White socks	WSL	Liverpool (H); Aston Villa (H); Manchester City (H); Leicester City (A); Brighton & Hove Albion (A); West Ham United (H); Chelsea (H); Everton (H); Manchester United (H); Tottenham Hotspur (H); Bristol City (H); Leicester City (H); Everton (A); Manchester City (A)
Home	Red body; White sleeves; White sorts; White socks	FA Cup	Manchester City (H)
Home	Red body; White sleeves; White sorts; White socks	League Cup	Bristol City (H); Tottenham Hotspur (H); Reading (A); London City Lionesses (A); Aston Villa (H); Chelsea (N)
Home	Red body; White sleeves; White sorts; White socks	UWCL	Linköping (N); Paris FC (N)
Home alt. 1	Red body; White sleeves; White sorts; Red socks	WSL	Tottenham Hotspur (A)
Home alt. 2	Red body; White sleeves; White sorts; Black socks	WSL	Chelsea (A)
Home (2024–25)	Red body; White sleeves; White sorts; Red socks	WSL	Brighton & Hove Albion (H)
Away (Women)	Blue body; Blue sleeves; Blue shorts; Blue socks	WSL	Manchester United (A); Bristol City (A); Liverpool (A); West Ham United (A); Aston Villa (A)
Away (Women)	Blue body; Blue sleeves; Blue shorts; Blue socks	League Cup	Southampton (A)
"No More Red"	White body; White sleeves; White shorts; White socks	FA Cup	Watford (H)

==== Goalkeeper kit usage ====
Kit	Combination	Usage	
Goalkeeper 1	Black body; Black sleeves; Black shorts; Black socks	WSL	Liverpool (H); Aston Villa (H); Manchester City (H); Leicester City (A); Chelsea (H); Tottenham Hotspur (A); Everton (H); Everton (A); Manchester City (A)
Goalkeeper 1	Black body; Black sleeves; Black shorts; Black socks	FA Cup	Manchester City (H)
Goalkeeper 1	Black body; Black sleeves; Black shorts; Black socks	League Cup	Bristol City (H); London City Lionesses (A); Aston Villa (H); Chelsea (N)
Goalkeeper 2	Blue body; Blue sleeves; Blue shorts; Blue socks	WSL	Manchester United (A); Liverpool (A); West Ham United (A); Manchester United (H); Leicester City (H)
Goalkeeper 2	Blue body; Blue sleeves; Blue shorts; Blue socks	FA Cup	Watford (H)
Goalkeeper 2	Blue body; Blue sleeves; Blue shorts; Blue socks	League Cup	Southampton (A); Tottenham Hotspur (H)
Goalkeeper 2	Blue body; Blue sleeves; Blue shorts; Blue socks	UWCL	Paris FC (N)
Goalkeeper 3 alt.	Green body; Green sleeves; Black shorts; Green socks	WSL	Bristol City (A); Brighton & Hove Albion (A); West Ham United (H); Tottenham Hotspur (H); Chelsea (A); Aston Villa (A); Bristol City (A)
Goalkeeper 3 alt.	Green body; Green sleeves; Black shorts; Green socks	League Cup	Reading (A)
Goalkeeper 3 alt.	Green body; Green sleeves; Black shorts; Green socks	UWCL	Linköping (N)
Goalkeeper (2024–25)	Yellow body; Yellow sleeves; Yellow shorts; Yellow socks	WSL	Brighton & Hove Albion (H)

== Competitions ==
=== Overall record ===
Competition	First match	Last match	Starting round	Final position	Record							
Competition	First match	Last match	Starting round	Final position	Pld	W	D	L	GF	GA	GD	Win %
Women's Super League	1 October 2023	18 May 2024	Matchday 1	3rd	22	16	2	4	53	20	+33	72.73
Women's FA Cup	14 January 2024	11 February 2024	Fourth round	Fifth round	2	1	0	1	5	2	+3	50.00
FA Women's League Cup	9 November 2023	31 March 2024	Group stage	Winners	7	6	1	0	23	5	+18	85.71
UEFA Women's Champions League	6 September 2023	9 September 2023	First qualifying round	First qualifying round	2	1	1	0	6	3	+3	50.00
Total					33	24	4	5	87	30	+57	72.73

Source: FA WSL

=== Women's Super League ===
==== League table ====
Pos	Team	Pld	W	D	L	GF	GA	GD	Pts	Qualification or relegation
1	Chelsea (C)	22	18	1	3	71	18	+53	55	Qualification for the Champions League group stage
2	Manchester City	22	18	1	3	61	15	+46	55	Qualification for the Champions League second round
3	Arsenal	22	16	2	4	53	20	+33	50	Qualification for the Champions League first round
4	Liverpool	22	12	5	5	36	28	+8	41	
5	Manchester United	22	10	5	7	42	32	+10	35	

Source: Women's Super League Table
Rules for classification: 1) Points; 2) Goal difference; 3) Number of goals scored.
(C) Champions

==== Results summary ====
Overall								Home						Away					
Pld	W	D	L	GF	GA	GD	Pts	W	D	L	GF	GA	GD	W	D	L	GF	GA	GD
22	16	2	4	53	20	+33	50	10	0	1	30	6	+24	6	2	3	23	14	+9

Last updated: 18 May 2024.
Source: FA WSL

==== Results by matchday ====
Matchday	1	2	3	4	5	6	7	8	9	10	11	12	13	14	15	16	17	18	19	20	21	22
Ground	H	A	H	A	H	A	A	H	H	A	H	A	A	H	H	A	A	H	H	A	A	H
Result	L	D	W	W	W	W	W	W	W	L	W	W	L	W	W	L	W	W	W	D	W	W
Position	10	9	7	7	5	2	2	2	2	3	3	3	3	3	3	3	3	3	3	3	3	3

Updated to match(es) played on 18 May 2024. Source: FA WSL
A = Away; H = Home; W = Win; D = Draw; L = Loss; P = Postponed

==== Matches ====
1 October 2023 1	Arsenal	0–1	Liverpool	Holloway
14:00 BST	McCabe (yellow card) 45'	Report	Taylor 48'; Hinds (yellow card) 79'; Holland (yellow card) 83'; Enderby (yellow card) 87'	Stadium: Emirates Stadium; Attendance: 54,115; Referee: Emily Heaslip

6 October 2023 2	Manchester United	2–2	Arsenal	Leigh
19:30 BST	Galton 27'; Zelem (yellow card) 58'; Malard 81'	Report	Blackstenius 14'; McCabe (yellow card) 62'; Foord (yellow card) 63'; Lacasse 90+3'	Stadium: Leigh Sports Village; Attendance: 8,312; Referee: Kirsty Dowle

15 October 2023 3	Arsenal	2–1	Aston Villa	Holloway
14:00 BST	McCabe 90+2'; Russo 90+4'	Report	Pacheco 25', (yellow card) 43'; Parker (yellow card) 86'	Stadium: Emirates Stadium; Attendance: 35,829; Referee: Amy Fearn

22 October 2023 4	Bristol City	1–2	Arsenal	Bristol
18:45 BST	Furness 16', (yellow card) 84'; Murray (yellow card) 90+3'	Report	McCabe 7', 59'; Wubben-Moy (yellow card) 31'; Russo (yellow card) 78'	Stadium: Ashton Gate; Attendance: 12,008; Referee: Adewunmi Soneye

5 November 2023 5	Arsenal	2–1	Manchester City	Borehamwood
12:30 GMT	Wälti (yellow card) 6'; Lacasse (yellow card) 7'; Catley 14'; Little (penalty missed) 20'; Pelova (yellow card) 34'; Foord (yellow card) 53'; Blackstenius 87'; McCabe (yellow card) 90+9'	Report	Hemp (yellow card) 13'; Keating (yellow card) 18'; Ouahabi (yellow card) 35'; Kelly 72'	Stadium: Meadow Park; Attendance: 3,453; Referee: Rebecca Welch

12 November 2023 6	Leicester City	2–6	Arsenal	Leicester
18:45 GMT	Tierney 36', (yellow card) 61'; Cayman 38', (yellow card) 49'	Report	Lacasse 49', (yellow card) 51'; Russo 52'; Foord 58'; Pelova 61'; Blackstenius 75'; Hurtig 90+8'	Stadium: King Power Stadium; Attendance: 4,179; Referee: Stacey Fullicks

19 November 2023 7	Brighton & Hove Albion	0–3	Arsenal	Crawley
14:00 GMT	Losada (yellow card) 32'; Bergsvand (yellow card) 72'	Report	Blackstenius 12'; Foord 80'; Russo (yellow card) 83'; Maanum 90+5'	Stadium: Broadfield Stadium; Attendance: 4,921; Referee: Tim Robinson

26 November 2023 8	Arsenal	3–0	West Ham United	Borehamwood
14:00 GMT	Maanum 2'; Mead 18', 41'	Report	Cissoko (yellow card) 37'	Stadium: Meadow Park; Attendance: 3,686; Referee: Lisa Benn

10 December 2023 9	Arsenal	4–1	Chelsea	Holloway
12:30 GMT	Mead 8'; Ilestedt 36'; Russo 38', 74' (pen.); McCabe (yellow card) 54'; Foord (yellow card) 56'; Maritz (yellow card) 82'; Maanum (yellow card) 84'; Pelova (yellow card) 87'	Report	Rytting Kaneryd 13'; James (yellow card) 70'	Stadium: Emirates Stadium; Attendance: 59,042; Referee: Rebecca Welch

16 December 2023 10	Tottenham Hotspur	1–0	Arsenal	Tottenham
12:00 GMT	Thomas 58'; Votíková (yellow card) 70'	Report	Wubben-Moy (yellow card) 63'	Stadium: Tottenham Hotspur Stadium; Attendance: 19,480; Referee: Cheryl Foster

20 January 2024 11	Arsenal	2–1	Everton	Borehamwood
14:00 GMT	Foord 9'; Mead 45+3'; Wälti (yellow card) 90+2'	Report	Snoeijs 24'; Galli (yellow card) 45+5'; Bennison (yellow card) 80'; Campbell (yellow card) 90+1'	Stadium: Meadow Park; Attendance: 3,713; Referee: Melissa Burgin

28 January 2024 12	Liverpool	0–2	Arsenal	Birkenhead
16:30 GMT	Lawley (yellow card) 19'; Daniëls (yellow card) 57'; Koivisto (yellow card) 80'; Matthews (yellow card) 90+3'	Report	Miedema 60'; Foord 69'; McCabe (yellow card) 72'	Stadium: Prenton Park; Attendance: 6,085; Referee: Rebecca Welch

4 February 2024 13	West Ham United	2–1	Arsenal	Dagenham
12:30 GMT	Asseyi 50' (pen.), (yellow card) 90+6'; Cissoko 58'; Smith (yellow card) 78'; Cooke (yellow card) 86'	Report	Russo 43'; Lacasse (yellow card) 88'	Stadium: Victoria Road; Attendance: 4,172; Referee: Melissa Burgin

17 February 2024 14	Arsenal	3–1	Manchester United	Holloway
12:30 GMT	Geyse 10' (o.g.); Lacasse 35'; McCabe (yellow card) 38'; Little 44' (pen.); Wubben-Moy (yellow card) 50'; Foord (yellow card) 90'	Report	Blundell (yellow card) 26'; Evans (yellow card) 34'; García 90+6'	Stadium: Emirates Stadium; Attendance: 60,160; Referee: Kirsty Dowle

3 March 2024 15	Arsenal	1–0	Tottenham Hotspur	Holloway
12:30 GMT	Russo 49'; Wubben-Moy (yellow card) 65'; McCabe (yellow card) 80'	Report	Ahtinen (yellow card) 79'; Summanen (yellow card) 82'; Spence (yellow card) 83'; Clinton (yellow card) 85'	Stadium: Emirates Stadium; Attendance: 60,050; Referee: Abigail Byrne

15 March 2024 16	Chelsea	3–1	Arsenal	Fulham
19:30 GMT	James 15'; Nüsken 21', 32'; Hampton (yellow card) 87'	Report	McCabe (yellow card) 42'; Lacasse (yellow card) 67'; Macario 86' (o.g.)	Stadium: Stamford Bridge; Attendance: 32,970; Referee: Rebecca Welch
Note: Originally scheduled for a 19:00 kick-off, this match was delayed 30 minutes due to a kit clash.

24 March 2024 17	Aston Villa	1–3	Arsenal	Aston
19:30 GMT	Salmon 35'; Daly (yellow card) 87'	Report	Pelova 54'; Wubben-Moy 84'; Blackstenius 86'; Cooney-Cross (yellow card) 90+2'	Stadium: Villa Park; Attendance: 10,076; Referee: Stacey Pearson
Note: Originally scheduled for a 18:45 kick-off, this match was delayed 45 minutes due to the Arsenal bus being held up in traffic congestion.

14 April 2024 18	Arsenal	5–0	Bristol City	Borehamwood
18:45 GMT	Mead 7', 32'; Powell 34' (o.g.); Russo 59', 73'	Report		Stadium: Meadow Park; Attendance: 3,565; Referee: Lisa Benn
Note: Originally scheduled for 31 March, this match was postponed due to Arsenal reaching the League Cup Final.

21 April 2024 19	Arsenal	3–0	Leicester City	Holloway
14:00 BST	Mead 28', 78'; Pelova (yellow card) 30'; Little (yellow card) 50'; Russo 75'	Report		Stadium: Emirates Stadium; Attendance: 42,820; Referee: Adewunmi Soneye

28 April 2024 20	Everton	1–1	Arsenal	Walton
12:30 BST	Hobson 90+5'; Snoeijs (yellow card) 90+8'	Report	Russo 80'	Stadium: Walton Hall Park; Attendance: 1,997; Referee: Phoebe Cross

5 May 2024 21	Manchester City	1–2	Arsenal	Manchester
14:15 BST	Hemp 17', (yellow card) 81'; Coombs (yellow card) 36'; Ouahabi (yellow card) 74'	Report	Lacasse (yellow card) 51'; Blackstenius 89', 90+2'	Stadium: Academy Stadium; Attendance: 5,409; Referee: Rebecca Welch

18 May 2024 22	Arsenal	5–0	Brighton & Hove Albion	Borehamwood
15:00 BST	Russo 17', 24'; Little (penalty missed) 60'; Miedema 64'; Carabalí 67' (o.g.); Maanum 88'	Report	Losada (yellow card) 43'	Stadium: Meadow Park; Attendance: 3,553; Referee: Lauren Impey

=== FA Cup ===
As a member of the top tier, Arsenal entered the FA Cup in the fourth round.

14 January 2024 Fourth round	Arsenal	5–1	Watford	Borehamwood
13:00 GMT	Russo 7'; Wälti 12'; Blackstenius 66'; Ilestedt 86'; Maanum 89'	Report	Agyemang 77'	Stadium: Meadow Park; Attendance: 3,739; Referee: Adewunmi Soneye

11 February 2024 Fifth round	Arsenal	0–1	Manchester City	Borehamwood
12:30 GMT	Wubben-Moy (yellow card) 90+3'; Mead (yellow card) 90+6'	Report	Aleixandri 74'; Casparij (yellow card) 90+3'; Kelly (yellow card) 90+5'	Stadium: Meadow Park; Attendance: 3,496; Referee: Stacey Pearson

=== FA Women's League Cup ===
As a result of being eliminated from the UEFA Champions League at the qualifying stage, Arsenal entered the League Cup at the group stage. Entering after the draw was made, they were placed in Group D.

==== Group stage ====
Pos	Team	Pld	W	PW	PL	L	GF	GA	GD	Pts	Qualification	ARS	TOT	SOU	BRI	REA
1	Arsenal (Q)	4	3	1	0	0	14	5	+9	11	Advanced to knock-out stage	—	3–3	–	3–1	–
2	Tottenham Hotspur (Q)	4	3	0	1	0	15	3	+12	10	Possible knock-out stage based on ranking	–	—	–	3–0	6–0
3	Southampton	4	1	1	0	2	3	6	−3	5		1–2	0–3	—	–	–
4	Bristol City	4	0	0	2	2	3	8	−5	2		–	–	1–1	—	1–1
5	Reading	4	0	1	0	3	1	14	−13	2		0–6	–	0–1	–	—

Updated to match(es) played on 24 January 2024. Source: FA Women's League Cup
Rules for classification: 1) Points; 2) Goal difference; 3) Number of goals scored; 4) Number of wins; 5) Head-to-head record
(Q) Qualified to the phase indicated

9 November 2023 Group stage	Arsenal	3–1	Bristol City	Borehamwood
19:00	Maanum 27'; Wubben-Moy 36'; Blackstenius 90+5'	Report	Struck 70'	Stadium: Meadow Park; Attendance: 1,974; Referee: Lisa Benn

23 November 2023 Group stage	Southampton	1–2	Arsenal	Southampton
18:30	Dean (yellow card) 50'; Pike 55'; Parnell (yellow card) 77'	Report	Maanum 59'; Ilestedt 90+2'	Stadium: St Mary's Stadium; Attendance: 13,438; Referee: Stacey Pearson

13 December 2023 Group stage	Arsenal	3–3 (4–3 p)	Tottenham Hotspur	Borehamwood
19:00	Blackstenius 19'; Maanum 37'; Beattie (yellow card) 59'; Turner 68' (o.g.)	Report	Thomas 17'; Naz 30', 48'; Petzelberger (yellow card) 61'; Clinton (yellow card) 67'; James (yellow card) 70'	Stadium: Meadow Park; Attendance: 3,618; Referee: Emily Heaslip
	Penalties
	Russo (penalty scored); Mead (penalty scored); Catley (penalty scored); Foord (penalty missed); Beattie (penalty scored)		(penalty missed) Naz; (penalty scored) Ayane; (penalty missed) Graham; (penalty scored) Zadorsky; (penalty scored) Petzelberger

24 January 2024 Group stage	Reading	0–6	Arsenal	Reading
19:00	Primmer (yellow card) 41'	Report	Foord 23'; Blackstenius 35', 45', 84'; Codina 51'; Mead 80'; Catley (yellow card) 88'	Stadium: Madejski Stadium; Attendance: 3.784; Referee: Levi Gray

==== Knockout stage ====
14 February 2024 Quarter finals	London City Lionesses	0–4	Arsenal	Dartford
19:00	Moloney (yellow card) 45+3'; Cowan (yellow card) 89'; Wilde (yellow card) 90+2'	Report	Lacasse 39', 57'; Little 45+4' (pen.); Russo 74'	Stadium: Princes Park; Attendance: 3,900; Referee: Lisa Benn
Note: Originally scheduled for 7 February, this match was postponed and rescheduled due to a waterlogged pitch.

6 March 2024 Semi finals	Arsenal	4–0	Aston Villa	Borehamwood
19:15	Blackstenius 9', 11', 40'; Maanum 18'	Report	Corsie (yellow card) 39'	Stadium: Meadow Park; Attendance: 3,507; Referee: Paul Howard

31 March 2024 Final	Arsenal	1–0 (a.e.t.)	Chelsea	Wolverhampton
15:00	Blackstenius 116'	Report	James (yellow card) 51'; Cuthbert (yellow card) 90+1'	Stadium: Molineux Stadium; Attendance: 21,462; Referee: Cheryl Foster

=== UEFA Women's Champions League ===
Having finished third in the 2022–23 Women's Super League, Arsenal entered the Champions League in the first qualifying round and were eliminated in the final of the qualifying tournament by Paris FC.

==== First qualifying round ====
6 September 2023 Semi-final	Arsenal	3–0	(Sweden) Linköping	Linköping
17:15 CEST	Little (penalty missed) 7'; Foord 53'; McCabe (yellow card) 68'; Hurtig 82'; Blackstenius 90'	Report	Saving (yellow card) 90+5'	Stadium: Linköping Arena; Attendance: 7,805; Referee: Deborah Anex (Switzerland); Assistant referees: Emilie Aubry (Switzerland); Giulia Tempestilli (Italy); Fourth official: Deborah Bianchi (Italy)
Note: Originally scheduled for a 17:00 kick-off, this match was delayed 15 minutes due to a fire alarm.

9 September 2023 Final	Arsenal	3–3 (a.e.t.) (2–4 p)	(France) Paris FC	Linköping
15:00 CEST	McCabe (yellow card) 78'; Russo 80', 116'; Catley (yellow card) 87'; Beattie 90+6'; Eidevall (yellow card) 90+7'; Hurtig (yellow card) 99'	Report	Grebova (yellow card) 43'; Bourdieu 56', 57' (yellow card) 60'; Fleury (yellow card) 78' (goal) 106'; Bogaert (yellow card) 81'	Stadium: Linköping Arena; Attendance: 1,411; Referee: Kristina Georgieva (Bulgaria); Assistant referees: Pavleta Rashkova (Bulgaria); Tamara Došen (Bosnia and Herzegovina); Fourth official: Merima Čelik (Bosnia and Herzegovina)
	Penalties
	Little (penalty scored); McCabe (penalty scored); Maanum (penalty missed); Russo (penalty missed)		(penalty scored) Greboval; (penalty scored) Hocine; (penalty scored) Matéo; (penalty missed) Corboz; (penalty scored) Ribadeira

== Post-season ==
24 May 2024	A-Leagues All Stars Women (Australia) (New Zealand)	0–1	(England) Arsenal	Melbourne
20:05 AEST		Report	Russo 39'	Stadium: Marvel Stadium; Attendance: 42,120; Referee: Casey Reibelt (Australia)

== See also ==
- List of Arsenal W.F.C. seasons
- 2023–24 in English football
