= Yvonne Krivohravek =

Austrian footballer

Personal information
- Full name: Yvonne Krivohravek
- Date of birth: 5 August 1981 (age 45)
- Place of birth: Austria
- Height: 1.70 m (5 ft 7 in)
- Position: Striker

Senior career*
Years	Team	Apps	(Gls)
–2004	Landhaus		
2004–2006	Neulengbach		
2006–2008	Landhaus		

International career
1999–?	Austria	4	
- * Club domestic league appearances and goals

Yvonne Krivohravek (or Krivohlavek) is an Austrian football striker who played for USC Landhaus Wien and SV Neulengbach in the ÖFB-Frauenliga. She was among the championship's top scorers in 2001 and 2002 and scored Landhaus' only goal in the 2001-02 UEFA Women's Cup.

She was a member of the Austrian national team.
