= Lisa Kolb =

Austrian footballer

Personal information
- Date of birth: 4 May 2001 (age 25)
- Place of birth: Gmunden, Austria
- Position: Forward

Team information
- Current team: SC Freiburg
- Number: 22

Senior career*
Years	Team	Apps	(Gls)
2016–2018	Union Kleinmünchen	0	(0)
2018–2019	Sturm Graz	0	(0)
2020–2021	Neulengbach	16	(19)
2021–	SC Freiburg	87	(8)

International career^{‡}
2016–2018	Austria U17	12	(6)
2018–2019	Austria U19	4	(2)
2020–	Austria	26	(2)
- * Club domestic league appearances and goals as of 22 November 2026 ‡ National team caps and goals as of 18 April 2026

Lisa Kolb (born 4 May 2001) is an Austrian footballer who plays as a forward for Bundesliga club SC Freiburg and the Austria national team.

== Club career ==
Kolb has played for Neulengbach in Austria.

Lisa Kolb started her club career in 2009 at VBSC Vöcklabrucker Sportclub, in the 2015/16 season she played for Sportunion Volksbank Vöcklamarkt. In 2015 she was top scorer in the U-14 national championship. In July 2016 she moved to Union Kleinmünchen in Linz, and from 2018/19 she played for Sturm Graz. At the end of 2018, she came in sixth place in the election for Footballer of the Year. A back injury forced her to take a break from spring 2019 to summer 2020, and she moved to SV Neulengbach in autumn 2019. In Sankt Pölten she attended the ÖFB Women's Academy from 2015 to 2020, where she graduated from high school in 2020.

In April 2021, her move to German Bundesliga club SC Freiburg was announced at the start of the 2021/22 season. In the election organized by the Austrian Football Association (ÖFB) and carried out among the coaches and fans of the Planet Pure Women's Bundesliga, she was elected player of the 2020/21 season ahead of Mateja Zver and Katja Wienerroither. At the beginning of 2023, her contract with SC Freiburg was extended.

In the 2023–24 season, Kolb scored the winner in the 1–0 away victory against SGS Essen.

== International career ==
Kolb played in the U17 and U19 national teams.

ÖFB team coach Irene Fuhrmann called her up for the first time in the Austrian squad for the European Championship qualifier against France on 27 October 2020 in Wiener Neustadt. She made her debut in the Austrian senior team on 27 November 2020 in the 3–0 defeat in the away game against France, where she came on as a substitute for Barbara Dunst in the 75th minute. She scored her first goal for the national team on 23 February 2022 in a 3–0 friendly win against Switzerland in Marbella.

Kolb capped for the Austria national team at senior level during the UEFA Euro 2022 qualifying. She was initially named in the squad for the European Championship finals, but was unable to travel to England due to a positive COVID-19 test.

== International goals ==
Lisa Kolb – goals for Austria
#	Date	Location	Opponent	Score	Result	Competition
1.	23 February 2022	Marbella Football Center, Marbella, Spain	Switzerland	1–0	3–0	Friendly
2.	27 November 2025	Estadio Antonio Gallardo, Arcos de la Frontera, Spain	Finland	1–1	1–1	Friendly

== Achievements ==
Club

Freiburg

- German Cup finalist 2023

Individual

- ÖFB Frauen Bundesliga top scorer: 2020–21 (19 goals)

== Awards ==
- 2021: Awarded Player of the Season 2020–21 in the Planet Pure Women's Bundesliga
- 2021: Awarded Player of the Season at the 25th Bruno Gala
