= Nina Burger =

Austrian footballer (born 1987)

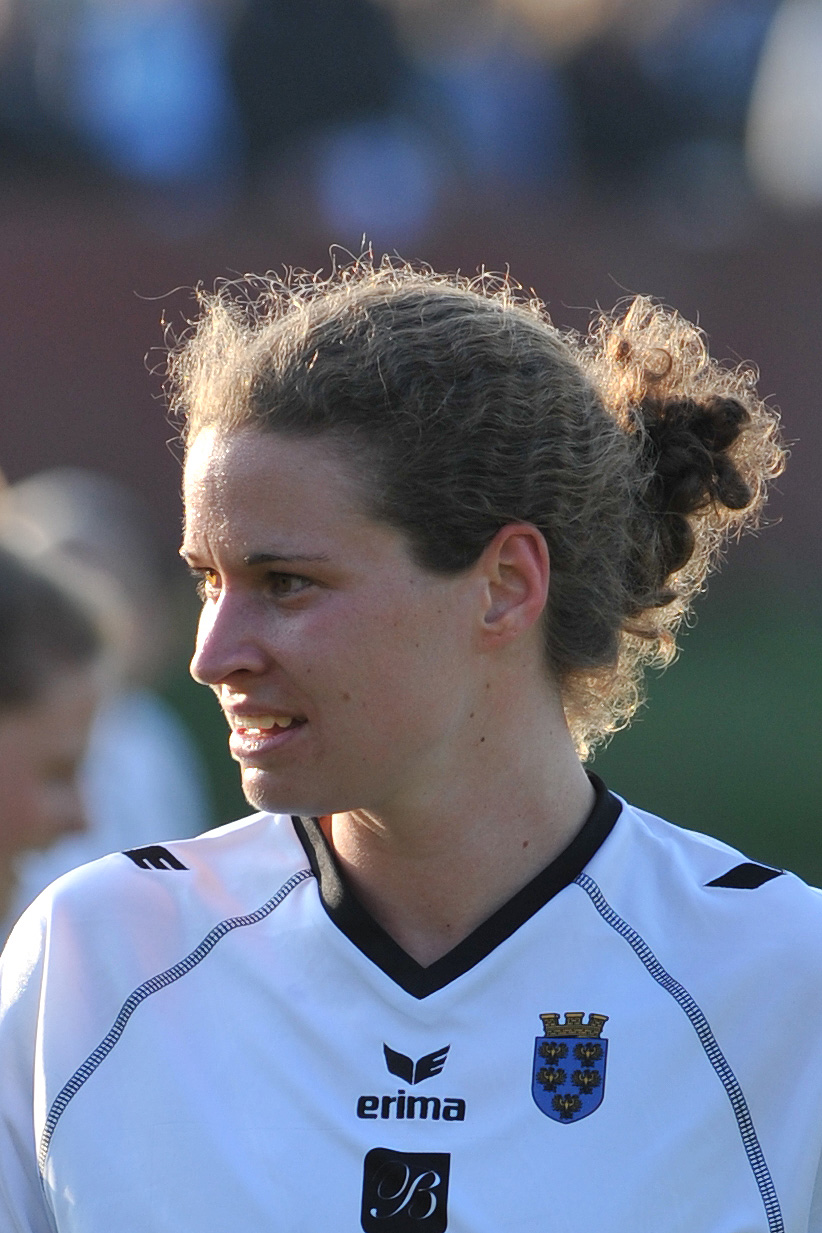

Personal information
- Full name: Nina Burger
- Date of birth: 27 December 1987 (age 38)
- Place of birth: Tulln an der Donau, Austria
- Height: 1.71 m (5 ft 7 in)
- Position: Striker

Senior career*
Years	Team	Apps	(Gls)
2005–2014	SV Neulengbach		
2014	Houston Dash	17	(4)
2014–2015	SV Neulengbach		
2015–2019	SC Sand	72	(28)

International career
2005–2019	Austria	108	(53)
- * Club domestic league appearances and goals

Nina Burger (born 27 December 1987) is an Austrian former football striker, who played for SC Sand of Frauen Bundesliga, after playing for SV Neulengbach of Austria's ÖFB-Frauenliga. She also played the 2014 season for the Houston Dash in the National Women's Soccer League (NWSL). She was the ÖFB-Frauenliga's top scorer for six seasons in a row between 2007 and 2012.

On 1 April 2019, she announced her retirement from the Austrian national team, after playing 108 matches with 53 goals.

== Honours ==
SV Neulengbach

- ÖFB-Frauenliga: Winner 2005–06, 2006–07, 2007–08, 2008–09, 2009–10, 2010–11, 2011–12, 2012–13, 2013–14, 2014–15
- ÖFB Ladies Cup: Winner 2005–06, 2006–07, 2007–08, 2008–09, 2009–10, 2010–11, 2011–12

SC Sand

- DFB-Pokal: Runner-up 2015–16, 2016–17

National Team

- Cyprus Cup: Winner 2016

Individual

- Top scorer ÖFB-Frauenliga: 2006–2007, 2007–2008, 2008–2009, 2009–2010, 2010–2011, 2011–2012

== International goals ==
Scores and results list Austria's goal tally first.

No.	Date	Venue	Opponent	Score	Result	Competition
1.	24 September 2005	Bük, Hungary	Hungary	1–0	3–0	2007 FIFA Women's World Cup qualification
2.	24 September 2005	Bük, Hungary	Hungary	3–0	3–0	2007 FIFA Women's World Cup qualification
3.	26 August 2006	Bruckneudorf, Austria	Hungary	1–1	1–1	2007 FIFA Women's World Cup qualification
4.	23 September 2006	Troyes, France	France	1–1	1–2	2007 FIFA Women's World Cup qualification
5.	26 August 2007	Gleisdorf, Austria	Israel	2–0	5–0	UEFA Women's Euro 2009 qualifying
6.	26 August 2007	Gleisdorf, Austria	Israel	3–0	5–0	UEFA Women's Euro 2009 qualifying
7.	26 August 2007	Gleisdorf, Austria	Israel	5–0	5–0	UEFA Women's Euro 2009 qualifying
8.	28 May 2008	Kutno, Poland	Poland	3–0	4–2	UEFA Women's Euro 2009 qualifying
9.	28 May 2008	Kutno, Poland	Poland	4–1	4–2	UEFA Women's Euro 2009 qualifying
10.	25 June 2008	Beit She'an, Israel	Israel	2–0	2–0	UEFA Women's Euro 2009 qualifying
11.	26 February 2010	Lagos, Portugal	Faroe Islands	1–0	3–0	2010 Algarve Cup
12.	3 March 2010	Olhão, Portugal	Faroe Islands	3–0	6–0	2010 Algarve Cup
13.	23 June 2010	Anger, Austria	Turkey	1–0	4–0	2011 FIFA Women's World Cup qualification
14.	25 August 2010	Samsun, Turkey	Turkey	1–2	1–2	2011 FIFA Women's World Cup qualification
15.	1 April 2012	Yerevan, Armenia	Armenia	1–2	4–2	UEFA Women's Euro 2013 qualifying
16.	1 April 2012	Yerevan, Armenia	Armenia	3–2	4–2	UEFA Women's Euro 2013 qualifying
17.	1 April 2012	Yerevan, Armenia	Armenia	4–2	4–2	UEFA Women's Euro 2013 qualifying
18.	16 June 2012	Prague, Czech Republic	Czech Republic	3–1	3–2	UEFA Women's Euro 2013 qualifying
19.	15 September 2012	Sankt Pölten, Austria	Denmark	2–0	3–1	UEFA Women's Euro 2013 qualifying
20.	15 September 2012	Sankt Pölten, Austria	Denmark	3–0	3–1	UEFA Women's Euro 2013 qualifying
21.	3 June 2013		Belgium	1–0	2–1	Friendly
22.	3 June 2013		Belgium	2–0	2–1	Friendly
23.	3 June 2013		Slovenia	2–1	3–1	Friendly
24.	3 June 2013		Slovenia	3–1	3–1	Friendly
25.	21 September 2013	Vöcklabruck, Austria	Bulgaria	1–0	4–0	2015 FIFA Women's World Cup qualification
26.	25 September 2013	Turku, Finland	Finland	1–1	1–2	2015 FIFA Women's World Cup qualification
27.	10 March 2014	Vila Real de Santo António, Portugal	Russia	3–2	3–2	2014 Algarve Cup
28.	5 April 2014	Lovech, Bulgaria	Bulgaria	1–0	6–1	2015 FIFA Women's World Cup qualification
29.	19 June 2014	Almaty, Kazakhstan	Kazakhstan	2–0	3–0	2015 FIFA Women's World Cup qualification
30.	13 September 2014	Sankt Pölten, Austria	Hungary	4–3	4–3	2015 FIFA Women's World Cup qualification
31.	17 September 2014	Pasching, Austria	Kazakhstan	2–0	5–1	2015 FIFA Women's World Cup qualification
32.	9 March 2015	Rovinj, Croatia	Republic of Ireland	2–0	2–0	2015 Istria Cup
33.	22 September 2015	Sankt Pölten, Austria	Wales	3–0	3–0	UEFA Women's Euro 2017 qualifying
34.	2 March 2016	Deryneia, Cyprus	Republic of Ireland	1–0	2–0	2016 Cyprus Women's Cup
35.	2 March 2016	Deryneia, Cyprus	Republic of Ireland	2–0	2–0	2016 Cyprus Women's Cup
36.	9 March 2016	Larnaca, Cyprus	Poland	1–0	2–1	2016 Cyprus Women's Cup
37.	6 April 2016	Steyr, Austria	Kazakhstan	5–0	6–1	UEFA Women's Euro 2017 qualifying
38.	2 June 2016	Oslo, Norway	Norway	1–0	2–2	UEFA Women's Euro 2017 qualifying
39.	4 June 2016	Horn, Austria	Israel	1–0	4–0	UEFA Women's Euro 2017 qualifying
40.	4 June 2016	Horn, Austria	Israel	2–0	4–0	UEFA Women's Euro 2017 qualifying
41.	22 October 2016	Regensburg, Germany	Germany	2–2	4–2	Friendly
42.	18 July 2017	Deventer, Netherlands	Switzerland	1–0	1–0	UEFA Women's Euro 2017
43.	26 July 2017	Rotterdam, Netherlands	Iceland	2–0	3–0	UEFA Women's Euro 2017
44.	19 September 2017	Kruševac, Serbia	Serbia	1–0	4–0	2019 FIFA Women's World Cup qualification
45.	19 September 2017	Kruševac, Serbia	Serbia	3–0	4–0	2019 FIFA Women's World Cup qualification
46.	19 September 2017	Kruševac, Serbia	Serbia	4–0	4–0	2019 FIFA Women's World Cup qualification
47.	23 November 2017	Maria Enzersdorf, Austria	Israel	2–0	2–0	2019 FIFA Women's World Cup qualification
48.	27 February 2019	Larnaca, Cyprus	Nigeria	1–0	4–1	2019 Cyprus Women's Cup

== See also ==
- List of women's footballers with 100 or more international caps
