= KSV Ankerbrot Montelaa =

- Full name: Kultur und SportVerein Ankerbrot Montelaa
- Nickname: Rot-weiß (red-whites)
- Short name: Ankerbrot
- Founded: 1936
- Ground: Anker Arena, Favoriten, Vienna, Austria
- Capacity: 1000
- League: 2. Landesliga (V)
- Website: http://www.ksvankerbrot-montelaa.at/
Home colours	Away colours

KSV Ankerbrot Montelaa is an Austrian association football club from the Favoriten district in Vienna, founded in 1936. The women's team, now defunct, were unexpectedly Austrian champions in 1975. At the turn of the 40s and 50s, the men's team was one of the strongest in the country, although the club currently plays at an amateur level. The club has had numerous name changes and mergers over the course of its history.

== History ==
=== Men's ===
The association was founded in 1936 by Hans Milanovich and Karl Großhaupt as a company association called Wiener Ankerbrotwerke.Soon after Ankerbrot was promoted to the then second-tier Viennese Regional League in 1948. After the autumn round on December 4, 1948, the club was renamed to Favoritner SK Blau-Weiß to improve its appeal to the public.

In 1950, Blau-Weiß also qualified through third place in the Vienna league for the new professional B league. The club was even able to move up to the A-League in 1950/51 with another third-place finish.

The start in the highest Austrian league was tailor-made: In the first game, the blue-whites reached a 2–2 draw against First Vienna 1894 in front of 50,000 spectators at the Prater Stadium. The first home game was won 1–0 against Kapfenberger SV. In the third round, however, the favorites were shown their limits: Austria Vienna had a 9–0 triumph. Ultimately, the favorites could not hold in the league and were relegated from bottom of the table. The season average of 6,700 spectators came to the home games of the Favoritner SK Blau-Weiß, with the Südstern stadium of FC Wien serving as the home ground .

After Blau-Weiß narrowly missed relegation in the B-League after the A-League year 1952/53, they returned to the original name Ankerbrot in 1955 and played again in the Vienna Regional League in the following years. In 1958, Ankerbrot took first place in the Vienna league and thus took part in the relegation to the B league. This was successfully completed with a 4-1 and 0-2 results against SK VÖEST Linz. After the B-League was replaced by the regional leagues as the second stage in 1959, Ankerbrot came to the Regionalliga Ost in 1959, but were relegated by one point.

After Ankerbrot's descent from the Vienna league in 1963, the former first division club began to slide down into the second division. In 1983, Ankerbrot merged with FC Laaerberg (founded in 1922) to form KSV Ankerbrot-Laaerberg, and in 1989 with SC St. Anton-Inzersdorf to form KSV Ankerbrot-St. Anton-Laaerberg. Ultimately, in 1998 it returned to the fourth-division Viennese league as KSV Ankerbrot Montelaa, in which the club continues to play with interruptions to this day. In 2006 the club had to relegate to the upper league A and immediately afterwards in 2007 to rise again to the city league as champions of the upper league A. In the summer of 2006, the KSV Ankerbrot Montelaa received the former Wienerfeldplatz as its new home, which from then on bears the name Anker Arena. In 2010 the way to the top league had to be started again, in the following year even the descent into 1st A-division. In 2012, they were promoted back to the league owing to their 2nd place.

=== Women's ===
In the 1970s, Ankerbrot also ran a successful women's team. In 1975 they won a sensational championship title in what was then the Wiener Fußballverband aligned Ladies League. The champions of this league are generally seen as Austrian champions, but are not recognized by the ÖFB. The women's football section was dissolved after this championship season. In the 2015/16 season the team was re-founded but folded after one season.

=== Naming history ===
- 1936: Wiener Ankerbrotwerke
- 1948: Favoritner SK Blau-Weiß
- 1955: KSV Ankerbrot Montelaa
- 1983: KSV Ankerbrot-Laaerberg (merger with FC Laaerberg)
- 1989: KSV Ankerbrot-St. Anton-Laaerberg (merger with SC St. Anton-Inzersdorf)
- 1998: KSV Ankerbrot Montelaa

== Honours ==
=== Men's ===
- A League:
  - 14th place (1x): 1951/52
- B League:
  - 3rd place (2x): 1949/50, 1950/51
- Austrian Cup
  - 1/8th: 1948/49
- Vienna League:
  - Champions (1x): 1957/58
  - 3rd place (1x): 1956/57

=== Women's ===
- Frauenliga:
  - Champions: 1974/75

== Bibliography and external links ==
- Official website
- "KSV Ankerbrot Montelaa". Soccerway.
- KSV Ankerbrot Montelaa Foot.dk profile
- KSV Ankerbrot Worldfootball profile
- Club results RSSSF profile
