= Maria Gstöttner =

Austrian footballer

Personal information
- Full name: Maria Gstöttner
- Date of birth: 8 February 1984 (age 42)
- Place of birth: Sankt Pölten, Austria
- Position: Striker

Senior career*
Years	Team	Apps	(Gls)
1998–2022	SV Neulengbach	467	(393)

International career
2000–	Austria	35	(5)
- * Club domestic league appearances and goals

Maria Gstöttner is a retired Austrian football striker, who played for SV Neulengbach in Austria's Frauenliga. She was the league's top scorer for five seasons in a row between 2001 and 2005.

She is a member of the Austrian national team.

== Career statistics ==
=== Club ===
Appearances and goals by club, season and competition
Club	Season	League			Cup		Continental		Total	
Club	Season	Division	Apps	Goals	Apps	Goals	Apps	Goals	Apps	Goals
Neulengbach	1998-99	ÖFB Frauen Bundesliga	0	0	0	0	0	0	0	0
Neulengbach	1999-00	ÖFB Frauen Bundesliga	0	0	0	0	0	0	0	0
Neulengbach	2000-01	ÖFB Frauen Bundesliga	0	33	0	0	0	0	0	33
Neulengbach	2001-02	ÖFB Frauen Bundesliga	0	34	0	0	0	0	0	34
Neulengbach	2002-03	ÖFB Frauen Bundesliga	18	28	0	0	0	0	18	28
Neulengbach	2003-04	ÖFB Frauen Bundesliga	0	26	1+	1+	6	11	7+	37+
Neulengbach	2004-05	ÖFB Frauen Bundesliga	0	22	0	0	3	1	3	23
Neulengbach	2005-06	ÖFB Frauen Bundesliga	0	0	0	0	5	1	5	1
Neulengbach	2006-07	ÖFB Frauen Bundesliga	0	38	0	0	3	0	3+	38+
Neulengbach	2007-08	ÖFB Frauen Bundesliga	16	12	4	5	6	5	26	22
Neulengbach	2008-09	ÖFB Frauen Bundesliga	16	8	5	4	6	2	27	14
Neulengbach	2009-10	ÖFB Frauen Bundesliga	14	9	4	4	3	0	21	13
Neulengbach	2010-11	ÖFB Frauen Bundesliga	18	26	5	10	4	0	27	36
Neulengbach	2011-12	ÖFB Frauen Bundesliga	17	27	5	6	4	3	26	36
Neulengbach	2012-13	ÖFB Frauen Bundesliga	18	36	5	5	2	2	25	43
Neulengbach	2013-14	ÖFB Frauen Bundesliga	18	11	5	5	4	0	27	16
Neulengbach	2014-15	ÖFB Frauen Bundesliga	8	1	3	1	2	0	13	2
Neulengbach	2015-16	ÖFB Frauen Bundesliga	16	11	5	6	0	0	21	17
Neulengbach	2016-17	ÖFB Frauen Bundesliga	11	3	4	4	0	0	15	7
Neulengbach	2017-18	ÖFB Frauen Bundesliga	19	7	5	4	0	0	24	11
Neulengbach	2018-19	ÖFB Frauen Bundesliga	18	6	3	1	0	0	21	7
Neulengbach	2019-20	ÖFB Frauen Bundesliga	0	0	1	0	0	0	1	0
Neulengbach	2020-21	ÖFB Frauen Bundesliga	9	3	0	0	0	0	9	2
Neulengbach	2021-22	ÖFB Frauen Bundesliga	18	4	0	0	0	0	18	4
Neulengbach	2022-23	ÖFB Frauen Bundesliga	2	0	0	0	0	0	2	0
Neulengbach	Total		263+	345+	55+	55+	48	25	237+	373+
Career total			467	393	55+	55+	48	25	570+	473+

== Titles ==
- Austrian league: 2003, 2004, 2005, 2006, 2007, 2008, 2009, 2010, 2011
- Austrian cup: 2003, 2004, 2005, 2006, 2007, 2008, 2009, 2010, 2011
