= DFC LUV Graz =

- Full name: Damen Fussball Club Lehrlings Unterstüntzungs Verein Graz
- Founded: 1978
- Ground: Sportplatz Union LUV Graz, Graz
- League: 2. Liga
- 2022–23: 6th
Home colours

DFC LUV Graz is an Austrian women's football club from Graz playing in the ÖFB-Frauenliga. Founded in 1978 as a section of LUV Graz, it became an independent team twenty years later.

LUV Graz won in 1979 the national Cup, its only national title to date. The team played five more unsuccessful finals between 1984 and 2007, and it was the runner-up of both the Championship and the Cup in 1986 and 2007. From 2009 on it has ended in the championship's bottom half. From summer 2014 to summer 2017 it cooperated with 1. DFC Leoben (founded in 1976) and participated as SPG LUV Graz/DFC Leoben.

== Titles ==
- 1 Austrian Cup (1979)
