= FC Südburgenland =

- Full name: Fußball Club Südburgenland
- Founded: 2002
- Ground: Sportplatz Olbendorf, Olbendorf
- Capacity: 1,000
- Chairman: Christine Koch
- Coach: Josef Heiling
- League: ÖFB-Frauenliga
- 2022–23: 7th
- Website: http://www.fcsuedburgenland.at
Home colours	Away colours

Fußball Club Südburgenland, also known as HOCO Südburgenland for sponsorship reasons, is an Austrian women's football club from Olbendorf, a town in South Burgenland, hence its name. Founded in 2002 after the women's team of SC Pinkafeld decided to become an independent club, it has played in the ÖFB-Frauenliga since the 2003–04 season.

After debuting with a fourth position and reaching the national cup's final, where it was trashed by SV Neulengbach (0–12), the team spent the six following seasons in the bottom half of the table, but it was never relegated. In 2011 Südburgenland was the championship's runner-up with a 13–3–2 record, and in 2012 it was fourth. It has also reached the cup's semifinals in three of the last fourth seasons as of 2012.

== 2021–22 squad ==
Note: Flags indicate national team as defined under FIFA eligibility rules; some limited exceptions apply. Players may hold more than one non-FIFA nationality.

No.	Pos.	Nation	Player
1	GK	(Italy) ITA	Maria Grazia Balbi
2	MF	(Austria) AUT	Susanna Koch
4	DF	(Austria) AUT	Eva Holndonner
5		(Hungary) HUN	Dora Nagy
7		(Austria) AUT	Maria Ramberger
8	FW	(Austria) AUT	Jennifer Köppel
9		(Austria) AUT	Emma Remich
10		(Austria) AUT	Marie-Kristin Leitner
11		(Austria) AUT	Jasmin Pelzmann
12	MF	(Austria) AUT	Lisa Strobl
13	FW	(Austria) AUT	Isabella Gold
14		(Austria) AUT	Anna Amtmann

No.	Pos.	Nation	Player
15		(Austria) AUT	Katja Graf
16		(Hungary) HUN	Dóra Fábián
17		(Austria) AUT	Linda Popofsits
18		(Austria) AUT	Hanna Graf
22		(Austria) AUT	Lena Schandl
24		(Hungary) HUN	Andrea Harsanyi
27		(Austria) AUT	Vanessa Beiglböck
31	GK	(Hungary) HUN	Fiona Fazekas
77		(Austria) AUT	Anna Sophie Schwahofer
99		(Austria) AUT	Julia Meixner
—		(Austria) AUT	Barbara Weber

== Competition record ==
Season	Division	Place	ÖFB Cup
2003–04	1	4th	Finalist
2004–05	1	8th	Round of 16
2005–06	1	9th	Round of 16
2006–07	1	7th	Quarterfinals
2007–08	1	8th	Round of 16
2008–09	1	7th	Semifinals
2009–10	1	6th	Quarterfinals
2010–11	1	2nd	Semifinals
2011–12	1	4th	Semifinals
