= Sheila Sánchez =

Spanish footballer

Personal information
- Full name: Sheila Sánchez Pose
- Position: Forward

Sheila Sánchez Pose is a Spanish football player who plays for FC Rot-Weiß Rankweil.
