= Union Kleinmünchen =

- Full name: Union Kleinmünchen Lady-Soccer Linz
- Founded: 1980
- Ground: Sportplatz Union Kleinmünchen, Linz
- Capacity: 1,000
- Chairman: Oskar Berger
- Manager: Gerald Reindl
- League: ÖFB-Frauenliga
- 2025–26: ÖFB-Frauenliga, 8th
- Website: http://www.frauenfussball.at/
Home colours	Away colours

Union Kleinmünchen is a football team from Linz in Austria, currently competing in the ÖFB-Frauenliga. Founded in 1980, it is the third most successful club in the championship after SV Neulengbach and USC Landhaus Wien with eight titles.

Union Kleinmünchen dominated the Frauenliga through the first half of the 1990s with five titles in a row and competed for primacy with Landhaus through the rest of the decade, winning three doubles between 1996 and 1999. The 2000s were far less successful; the club was the championship's runner-up in 2005, but it was relegated in 2008.

After two years in the 2. Frauenliga Union Kleinmünchen returned to top flight for the 2011 championship, ending second to last.

== Titles ==
- 8 Austrian Leagues (1990 — 1994, 1996, 1998, 1999)
- 6 Austrian Cups (1991, 1993, 1995, 1996, 1998, 1999)
- 1 Austrian Supercup (2001)

== 2023-24 squad ==
Note: Flags indicate national team as defined under FIFA eligibility rules; some limited exceptions apply. Players may hold more than one non-FIFA nationality.

No.	Pos.	Nation	Player
1	GK	AUT	Denise Pesendorfer
2	MF	AUT	Silke Beidinger
3	DF	AUT	Christina Tredak
4	DF	AUT	Nadine Wiener
5	DF	AUT	Isabelle-Eva Köck
6	MF	AUT	Nicole Angerer
7	FW	AUT	Eva-Maria Wirtitsch
8	MF	AUT	Viktoria Madl

No.	Pos.	Nation	Player
9	FW	AUT	Caroline Stöfan
10	DF	AUT	Sara Schörgenhuber
11	MF	AUT	Magdalena Jakober
14	MF	AUT	Stefanie Birglehner
15	MF	AUT	Aurelia Zeilinger
16	FW	ALB	Floralba Krasniqi
17	DF	AUT	Silke Brunner
—	GK	AUT	Simone Böcksteiner
