= USC Landhaus Wien =

- Full name: Union Sportclub Landhaus Wien
- Founded: 1968
- Ground: Sportplatz Jochbergengasse
- League: ÖFB-Frauenliga
- 2018-19: ÖFB-Frauenliga, 3rd
- Website: http://www.usclandhaus.org
Home colours	Away colours

Union Sport Club Landhaus Wien is an Austrian women's football club from Vienna. Founded in 1968, four years later it was a founding member of the ÖFB-Frauenliga, where it has played since – it has never been relegated. Landhaus won 12 championships and 11 national cups between 1973 and 2002, which makes it the most successful club in both competitions. In 2001 it was the first Austrian team to take part in the newly founded in the UEFA Women's Cup, losing all three group stage matches.

== 2019–20 squad ==
Note: Flags indicate national team as defined under FIFA eligibility rules; some limited exceptions apply. Players may hold more than one non-FIFA nationality.

No.	Pos.	Nation	Player
1	GK	(Austria) AUT	Manuela Lehnhart
2	MF	(Slovakia) SVK	Kamila Hudecová
3	DF	(Austria) AUT	Tina Charwat
4	MF	(Austria) AUT	Lisa-Marie Zmek
5	MF	(Austria) AUT	Angelika Bauer
6	FW	(Austria) AUT	Adriana Stockinger
7	MF	(Austria) AUT	Astrid Dopler
8	DF	(Austria) AUT	Nicola Watzinger
9	FW	(Slovakia) SVK	Jana Roziaková
10	MF	(Austria) AUT	Gabriele Fiedler

No.	Pos.	Nation	Player
11	FW	(Austria) AUT	Deniz Kuyucaklioglu
12	DF	(Austria) AUT	Katrin Obermann
13	MF	(Austria) AUT	Michele Acketa
14	MF	(Austria) AUT	Jessica Brunner
15	GK	(Austria) AUT	Sabine Baumann
16	MF	(Austria) AUT	Jelena Prvulovic
17	MF	(Austria) AUT	Lisa Ehold
18	FW	(Austria) AUT	Desiree Hauer
19	DF	(Austria) AUT	Franziska Sottner

== Honours ==
=== Titles ===
- Austrian League (12)
  - 1974, 1976, 1978, 1981, 1982, 1983, 1988, 1989, 1995, 1997, 2000, 2001
- Austrian Cup (11)
  - 1973, 1975, 1976, 1980, 1986, 1987, 1988, 1997, 2000, 2001, 2002
- Austrian Supercup (1)
  - 2002

=== Competition record ===
Season	Division	Place	ÖFB Cup	UEFA
1972–73	1	2nd	Champion	
1973–74	1	1st	Finalist	
1974–75	1	2nd	Champion	
1975–76	1	1st	Champion	
1976–77	1	2nd	Finalist	
1977–78	1	1st		
1978–79	1	5th		
1979–80	1	3rd	Champion	
1980–81	1	1st		
1981–82	1	1st	Finalist	
1982–83	1	1st	Finalist	
1983–84	1	2nd		
1984–85	1	2nd		
1985–86	1	3rd	Champion	
1986–87	1	4th	Champion	
1987–88	1	1st	Champion	
1988–89	1	1st		
1989–90	1	4th		
1990–91	1	4th	Finalist	
1991–92	1	2nd		
1992–93	1	2nd		
1993–94	1	2nd	Finalist	
1994–95	1	1st		
1995–96	1	2nd		
1996–97	1	1st	Champion	
1997–98	1	2nd		
1998–99	1	4th	Finalist	
1999–00	1	1st	Champion	
2000–01	1	1st	Champion	
2001–02	1	3rd	Champion	Group stage
2002–03	1	3rd		
2003–04	1	2nd	Semifinals	
2004–05	1	4th	Quarterfinals	
2005–06	1	2nd	Semifinals	
2006–07	1	3rd	Quarterfinals	
2007–08	1	2nd	Finalist	
2008–09	1	2nd	Round of 16	
2009–10	1	5th	Semifinals	
2010–11	1	5th	Round of 16	
2011–12	1	6th	Quarterfinals	

=== UEFA competition record ===
Season	Competition	Stage	Result	Opponent	Scorers
2001–02	Women's Cup	Group stage	1–2; 0–5; 0–8	(Faroe Islands) KÍ Klaksvík (Italy) Torres (Finland) HJK Helsinki	Krivohravek
