= ÖFB Frauen Bundesliga =

Women's football league in Austria

- Founded: 1973
- Country: Austria
- Confederation: UEFA
- Divisions: 1
- Number of clubs: 10
- Level on pyramid: 1
- Relegation to: 2. Frauen Bundesliga
- Domestic cup: ÖFB Frauen Cup
- International cup: UEFA Champions League
- Current champions: FK Austria Wien (1st title) (2025–26 ÖFB Frauen Bundesliga)
- Most championships: USC Landhaus Wien; SV Neulengbach (12 titles each)
- Website: oefb.at
- Current: 2026–27 ÖFB Frauen Bundesliga

The ÖFB Frauen Bundesliga (lit. 'ÖFB Women Federal League' in German), known as the ADMIRAL Frauen Bundesliga for sponsorship reasons, is the top level women's football league in Austria. Since 2002, the champion qualifies for the UEFA Women's Champions League.

In the 2000s, SV Neulengbach dominated the league, winning the championships for twelve consecutive years (from 2003 until 2014). Since then, SKN St. Pölten have emerged as the league's dominant team, winning ten consecutive titles as of the 2024–25 season.

== Format ==
From the 2010–11 season onwards, the ten teams have played each other twice, once home and once away.

== Records ==
Fastest Goals

1. Modesta Uka - 14' seconds. (LASK vs FK Austria Wien - November 1, 2026)
2. Karla Kurkutović - 21' seconds. (First Vienna FC 1894 vs FC Blau-Weiß Linz/Kleinmünchen - October 31, 2026)

== Teams ==
As of the 2025–26 season

- SCR Altach
- SK Sturm Graz
- FC Red Bull Salzburg
- First Vienna FC
- Linzer ASK
- SV Neulengbach
- SPG Blau-Weiß Linz/Union Kleinmünchen
- Südburgenland/Hartberg
- SKN St. Pölten
- FK Austria Wien

== List of champions ==
As of the 2025–26 season

The list of champions:

Season	Champion	Runner-up
1972–73	Favoritner AC	USC Landhaus Wien
1973–74	USC Landhaus Wien	ESV Ostbahn XI Wien
1974–75	KSV Ankerbrot Wien	USC Landhaus Wien
1975–76	USC Landhaus Wien	ESV Ostbahn XI Wien
1976–77	SV Elektra Wien	USC Landhaus Wien
1977–78	USC Landhaus Wien	SV Elektra Wien
1978–79	SV Elektra Wien	ESV Ostbahn IX Wien
1979–80	SV Elektra Wien	ESV Ostbahn XI Wien
1980–81	USC Landhaus Wien	ESV Ostbahn XI Wien
1981–82	USC Landhaus Wien	ESV Ostbahn XI Wien
1982–83	USC Landhaus Wien	ESV Ostbahn XI Wien
1983–84	SV Aspern	USC Landhaus Wien
1984–85	ESV Ostbahn XI Wien	USC Landhaus Wien
1985–86	1. DFC Leoben	DFC LUV Graz
1986–87	1. DFC Leoben	Union Kleinmünchen
1987–88	USC Landhaus Wien	Union Kleinmünchen
1988–89	USC Landhaus Wien	Union Kleinmünchen
1989–90	Union Kleinmünchen	DFC Brunn am Gebirge
1990–91	Union Kleinmünchen	ESV Ostbahn XI Wien
1991–92	Union Kleinmünchen	USC Landhaus Wien
1992–93	Union Kleinmünchen	USC Landhaus Wien
1993–94	Union Kleinmünchen	USC Landhaus Wien
1994–95	USC Landhaus Wien	Union Kleinmünchen
1995–96	Union Kleinmünchen	USC Landhaus Wien
1996–97	USC Landhaus Wien	Union Kleinmünchen
1997–98	Union Kleinmünchen	USC Landhaus Wien
1998–99	Union Kleinmünchen	SV Neulengbach
1999–00	USC Landhaus Wien	Union Kleinmünchen
2000–01	USC Landhaus Wien	SV Neulengbach
2001–02	Innsbrucker AC	SV Neulengbach
2002–03	SV Neulengbach	Innsbrucker AC
2003–04	SV Neulengbach	USC Landhaus Wien
2004–05	SV Neulengbach	Union Kleinmünchen
2005–06	SV Neulengbach	USC Landhaus Wien
2006–07	SV Neulengbach	DFC LUV Graz
2007–08	SV Neulengbach	FC Wacker Innsbruck
2008–09	SV Neulengbach	FC Wacker Innsbruck
2009–10	SV Neulengbach	FC Wacker Innsbruck
2010–11	SV Neulengbach	FC Südburgenland
2011–12	SV Neulengbach	Spratzern
2012–13	SV Neulengbach	Spratzern
2013–14	SV Neulengbach	FSK St. Pölten-Spratzern
2014–15	FSK St. Pölten-Spratzern	SV Neulengbach
2015–16	FSK St. Pölten-Spratzern	SK Sturm Graz
2016–17	SKN St. Pölten	SK Sturm Graz
2017–18	SKN St. Pölten	USC Landhaus Wien
2018–19	SKN St. Pölten	SK Sturm Graz
2019–20	season cancelled due to the COVID-19 pandemic in Austria	
2020–21	SKN St. Pölten	SG USC Landhaus/FK Austria Wien
2021–22	SKN St. Pölten	SK Sturm Graz
2022–23	SKN St. Pölten	SK Sturm Graz
2023–24	SKN St. Pölten	First Vienna FC
2024–25	SKN St. Pölten	FK Austria Wien
2025–26	FK Austria Wien	SKN St. Pölten

== Titles by team ==
As of the 2025–26 season

Titles	Team	Seasons
12	USC Landhaus Wien	1974, 1976, 1978, 1981, 1982, 1983, 1988, 1989, 1995, 1997, 2000, 2001
12	SV Neulengbach	2003, 2004, 2005, 2006, 2007, 2008, 2009, 2010, 2011, 2012, 2013, 2014
10	SKN St. Pölten	2015, 2016, 2017, 2018, 2019, 2021, 2022, 2023, 2024, 2025
8	Union Kleinmünchen	1990, 1991, 1992, 1993, 1994, 1996, 1998, 1999
3	FS Elektra Wien	1977, 1979, 1980
2	1. DFC Leoben	1986, 1987
1	Favoritner AC Wien	1973
1	KSV Ankerbrot Wien	1975
1	SV Aspern	1984
1	ESV Ostbahn XI Wien	1985
1	Innsbrucker AC	2002
1	FK Austria Wien	2026

== Top scorers ==
As of the 2024–25 season

Top scorers since the 1997–98 season.

Season	Player	Club	Goals
1997–98	(Austria) Gertrud Stallinger	Union Kleinmünchen	20
1998–99	(Austria) Gertrud Stallinger	Union Kleinmünchen	14
1999–2000	(Austria) Nina Aigner	USC Landhaus Wien	27
2000–01	(Austria) Maria Gstöttner	SV Neulengbach	33
2001–02	(Austria) Maria Gstöttner	SV Neulengbach	34
2002–03	(Austria) Maria Gstöttner	SV Neulengbach	28
2003–04	(Austria) Maria Gstöttner	SV Neulengbach	26
2004–05	(Austria) Maria Gstöttner	SV Neulengbach	22
2005–06	(Brazil) Rosana	SV Neulengbach	26
2006–07	(Austria) Nina Burger	SV Neulengbach	38
2007–08	(Austria) Nina Burger	SV Neulengbach	33
2008–09	(Austria) Nina Burger	SV Neulengbach	23
2009–10	(Austria) Nina Burger	SV Neulengbach	22
2010–11	(Austria) Nina Burger	SV Neulengbach	29
2011–12	(Austria) Nina Burger	SV Neulengbach	28
2012–13	(Austria) Maria Gstöttner	SV Neulengbach	36
2013–14	(Austria) Nicole Billa	FSK St. Pölten-Spratzern	24
2014–15	(Austria) Nicole Billa	FSK St. Pölten-Spratzern	27
2015–16	(Hungary) Fanny Vágó	FSK St. Pölten-Spratzern	19
2016–17	(Hungary) Fanny Vágó	FSK St. Pölten-Spratzern	21
2017–18	(Hungary) Fanny Vágó	FSK St. Pölten-Spratzern	18
2018–19	(Spain) Sheila Sánchez Pose	FC Rot-Weiß Rankweil	18
2019–20	season cancelled due to COVID-19 pandemic in Austria		
2020–21	(Austria) Lisa Kolb	SV Neulengbach	19
2021–22	(Austria) Annabel Schasching	Sturm Graz	15
2022–23	(Austria) Linda Natter	FFC Vorderland	18
2023–24	(Germany) Verena Volkmer	FK Austria Wien	14
2024–25	(Germany) Verena Volkmer	FK Austria Wien	14
2025–26	(Slovenia) Zala Kuštrin	SK Sturm Graz	13
2025–26	(Hungary) Brigitta Pulins	SC Rheindorf Altach	13
