= ÖFB Frauen Cup =

Women's football cup competition in Austria

- Founded: 1972
- Region: Austria
- Teams: 32 (2018–19)
- Current champions: FK Austria Wien (1st title) (2025–26)
- Most championships: SKN St. Pölten; USC Landhaus Wien (11 titles)
- Website: ÖFB Frauen Cup (in German)
- 2025–26 ÖFB Frauen Cup

The ÖFB Frauen Cup, known as the SPORTLAND Frauen Cup for sponsorship reasons, is the annual cup competition of women's football teams in Austria. It has been contested since the 1972–73 season, and is organized by the ÖFB.

== Format ==
There are five rounds to play. Entering are 32 teams, 10 from the ÖFB Frauen Bundesliga and 22 from local federations. Round 1 is drawn on a local basis, after that all teams can meet each other. Additionally, teams from the Frauenliga cannot be drawn against each other in round 1.

== List of finals ==
The list of finals:

| Year | Winner | Runner-up | Result |
|---|---|---|---|
| 1972–73 | USC Landhaus Wien | SV Kagran | 16–0, 10–0 |
| 1973–74 | ESV Ostbahn XI Wien | USC Landhaus Wien | 1–1 (2–1 pen.) |
| 1974–75 | USC Landhaus Wien | ESV Ostbahn XI Wien | 2–0 |
| 1975–76 | USC Landhaus Wien | SV Kagran | 3–1, 3–0 |
| 1976–77 | FS Elektra Wien | USC Landhaus Wien | 2–0 |
| 1977–78 | FS Elektra Wien | DFC LUV Graz | 5–0, 5–1 |
| 1978–79 | DFC LUV Graz | FS Elektra Wien | 3–2 |
| 1979–80 | USC Landhaus Wien | FS Elektra Wien | 1–1 (3–2 pen.) |
| 1980–81 | ESV Ostbahn XI Wien | SG Alland–Brunn a. Geb. | 4–0 |
| 1981–82 | ESV Ostbahn XI Wien | USC Landhaus Wien | 3–2 |
| 1982–83 | ESV Ostbahn XI Wien | USC Landhaus Wien | 2–0 |
| 1983–84 | ESV Ostbahn XI Wien | DFC LUV Graz | 3–1 |
| 1984–85 | FC Wacker Innsbruck | DFC LUV Graz | 3–1 |
| 1985–86 | USC Landhaus Wien | DFC LUV Graz | 1–0 |
| 1986–87 | USC Landhaus Wien | 1. DFC Leoben | 2–1 |
| 1987–88 | USC Landhaus Wien | DFC Austria–Brunn a. Geb. | 3–1 |
| 1988–89 | not held | | |
| 1989–90 | SC Brunn . Geb. | 1. DFC Leoben | 2–1 |
| 1990–91 | Union Kleinmünchen | USC Landhaus Wien | 3–2 |
| 1991–92 | not held | | |
| 1992–93 | Union Kleinmünchen | DFC Heidenreichstein | 2–0 |
| 1993–94 | Innsbrucker AC | USC Landhaus Wien | 1–1 (3–2 pen.) |
| 1994–95 | Union Kleinmünchen | DFC Heidenreichstein | 1–0 |
| 1995–96 | Union Kleinmünchen | Innsbrucker AC | 2–0 |
| 1996–97 | USC Landhaus Wien | Union Kleinmünchen | 3–2 |
| 1997–98 | Union Kleinmünchen | SV Neulengbach | 3–1 |
| 1998–99 | Union Kleinmünchen | USC Landhaus Wien | 6–0 |
| 1999–2000 | USC Landhaus Wien | 1. DFC Leoben | 5–3 |
| 2000–01 | USC Landhaus Wien | Union Kleinmünchen | 10–1 |
| 2001–02 | USC Landhaus Wien | ASV St. Margarethen–Lavanttal | 11–1 |
| 2002–03 | SV Neulengbach | Union Kleinmünchen | 5–1 |
| 2003–04 | SV Neulengbach | FC Südburgenland | 12–0 |
| 2004–05 | SV Neulengbach | Innsbrucker AC | 2–1 |
| 2005–06 | SV Neulengbach | DFC LUV Graz | 3–0 |
| 2006–07 | SV Neulengbach | DFC LUV Graz | 3–1 |
| 2007–08 | SV Neulengbach | USC Landhaus Wien | 6–2 |
| 2008–09 | SV Neulengbach | FC Wacker Innsbruck | 5–1 |
| 2009–10 | SV Neulengbach | ASK Erlaa McDonalds | 4–0 |
| 2010–11 | SV Neulengbach | DFC LUV Graz | 4–0 |
| 2011–12 | SV Neulengbach | FC Wacker Innsbruck | 4–0 |
| 2012–13 | ASV Spratzern | SV Neulengbach | 3–3 a.e.t. (4–3 pen.) |
| 2013–14 | FSK St. Pölten-Spratzern | SV Neulengbach | 4–3 |
| 2014–15 | FSK St. Pölten-Spratzern | SV Neulengbach | 4–3 |
| 2015–16 | FSK St. Pölten-Spratzern | SV Neulengbach | 1–0 |
| 2016–17 | SKN St. Pölten | SV Neulengbach | 5–0 |
| 2017–18 | SKN St. Pölten | SV Neulengbach | 5–1 |
| 2018–19 | SKN St. Pölten | USC Landhaus/Austria Wien | 2–0 |
| 2019–20 | Competition abandoned | | |
| 2020–21 | Competition not held | | |
| 2021–22 | SKN St. Pölten | SK Sturm Graz | 2–0 |
| 2022–23 | SKN St. Pölten | SPG FCR Altach/FFC Vorderland | 3–1 |
| 2023–24 | SKN St. Pölten | FK Austria Wien | 3–0 |
| 2024–25 | SKN St. Pölten | FK Austria Wien | 2–1 |
| 2025–26 | FK Austria Wien | FC Red Bull Salzburg | 1–0 |

== Titles by team ==
| Titles | Finals | Team | Years won |
|---|---|---|---|
| 11 | 20 | USC Landhaus Wien | 1973, 1975, 1976, 1980, 1986, 1987, 1988, 1997, 2000, 2001, 2002 |
| 11 | 11 | SKN St. Pölten* | 2013, 2014, 2015, 2016, 2017, 2018, 2019, 2022, 2023, 2024, 2025 |
| 10 | 17 | SV Neulengbach | 2003, 2004, 2005, 2006, 2007, 2008, 2009, 2010, 2011, 2012 |
| 6 | 9 | Union Kleinmünchen | 1991, 1993, 1995, 1996, 1998, 1999 |
| 5 | 6 | ESV Ostbahn XI Wien | 1974, 1981, 1982, 1983, 1984 |
| 2 | 6 | FC Wacker Innsbruck** | 1985, 1994 |
| 2 | 4 | FS Elektra Wien | 1977, 1978 |
| 1 | 8 | DFC LUV Graz | 1979 |
| 1 | 3 | SC Brunn am Gebirge*** | 1990 |
| 1 | 2 | FK Austria Wien | 2026 |
| 0 | 3 | 1. DFC Leoben | |
| 0 | 2 | DFC Heidenreichstein | |
| 0 | 2 | SV Kagran | |
| 0 | 1 | ASV St. Margarethen–Lavanttal | |
| 0 | 1 | FC Südburgenland | |
| 0 | 1 | ASK Erlaa McDonalds | |
| 0 | 1 | SPG FCR Altach/FFC Vorderland | |
| 0 | 1 | SK Sturm Graz | |
| 0 | 1 | FC Red Bull Salzburg | |

* Includes final(s) played and title(s) won as ASV Simacek Spratzern and FSK St. Pölten-Spratzern
** Includes final(s) played and title(s) won as Innsbrucker AC
*** Includes final(s) played and title(s) won as SG Alland–Brunn a. Geb.
