= SV Neulengbach =

- Full name: SV Neulengbach
- Founded: 1923; Women's section founded 1996
- Ground: Wienerwaldstadion, Neulengbach
- Capacity: 3,000
- Coach: Maria Gstöttner/Katja Gürtler
- League: ÖFB-Frauenliga
- 2024–25: ÖFB-Frauenliga, 8th
- Website: http://www.neulengbach.at/
Home colours	Away colours

SV Neulengbach is an Austrian association football club from Neulengbach. The club was founded in 1923, and in 1996 expanded to include a women's football section.

While the men always played in the lower leagues of Austria, the women are a success story. In 1996–97, their first season, they started in the second division and won it. They were then promoted to the ÖFB-Frauenliga, the first division.

== History ==
In the first season in the Frauenliga, SV Neulengbach finished 5th out of eight and reached the ÖFB Ladies Cup final. The next seasons they took 2nd, 3rd, 2nd and 2nd.

In 2002–03 they won their first championship title, without losing a game and 120–5 goals, and became a dominating force winning every championship and cup until 2012. In 2004 they achieved a record 12–0 win against FC Südburgenland in the cup-final.

In the 2009–10 Champions League, they reached the round of 16 but lost to Torres Calcio. In 2013–14 the club reached the quarter-final for the first time, losing 8–1 on aggregate to Tyresö FF of Sweden.

Much of SV Neulengbach's success was predicated on the prolific goal-scoring of strikers Nina Burger and Maria Gstöttner. The club also imported Brazil women's national football team players such as Rosana, Monica Hickmann Alves and Darlene de Souza.

In April 2026, the club announced the dissolution of its women's section due to financial difficulties. The club was also denied a license for the 2026–27 Austrian Women's Bundesliga season by the ÖFB.

== Titles ==
- 12 times League champion: 2003 to 2014
- 10 times Cup winner: 2003 to 2012

== UEFA Competitions history ==
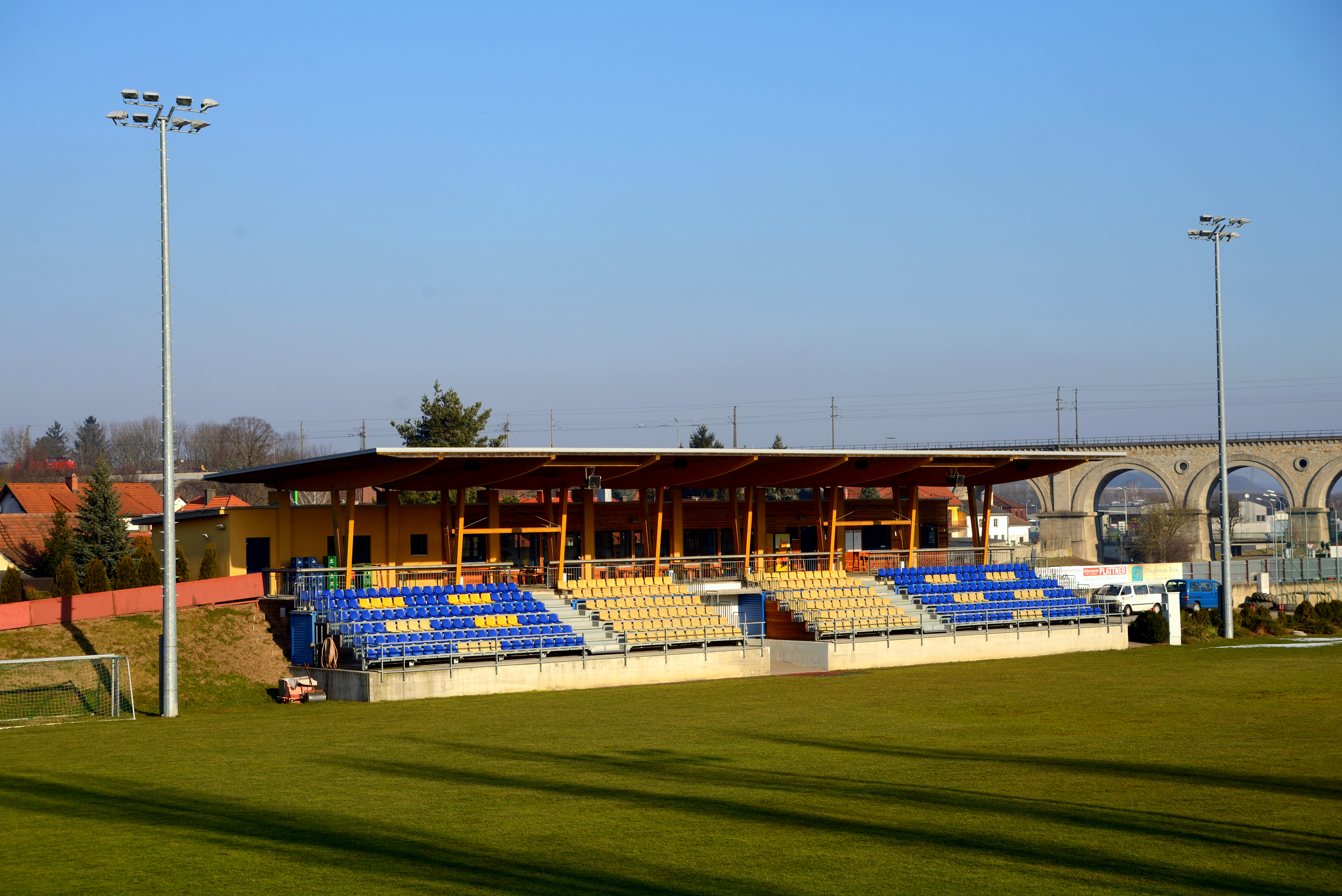
Home ground Wienerwaldstadion in February 2015

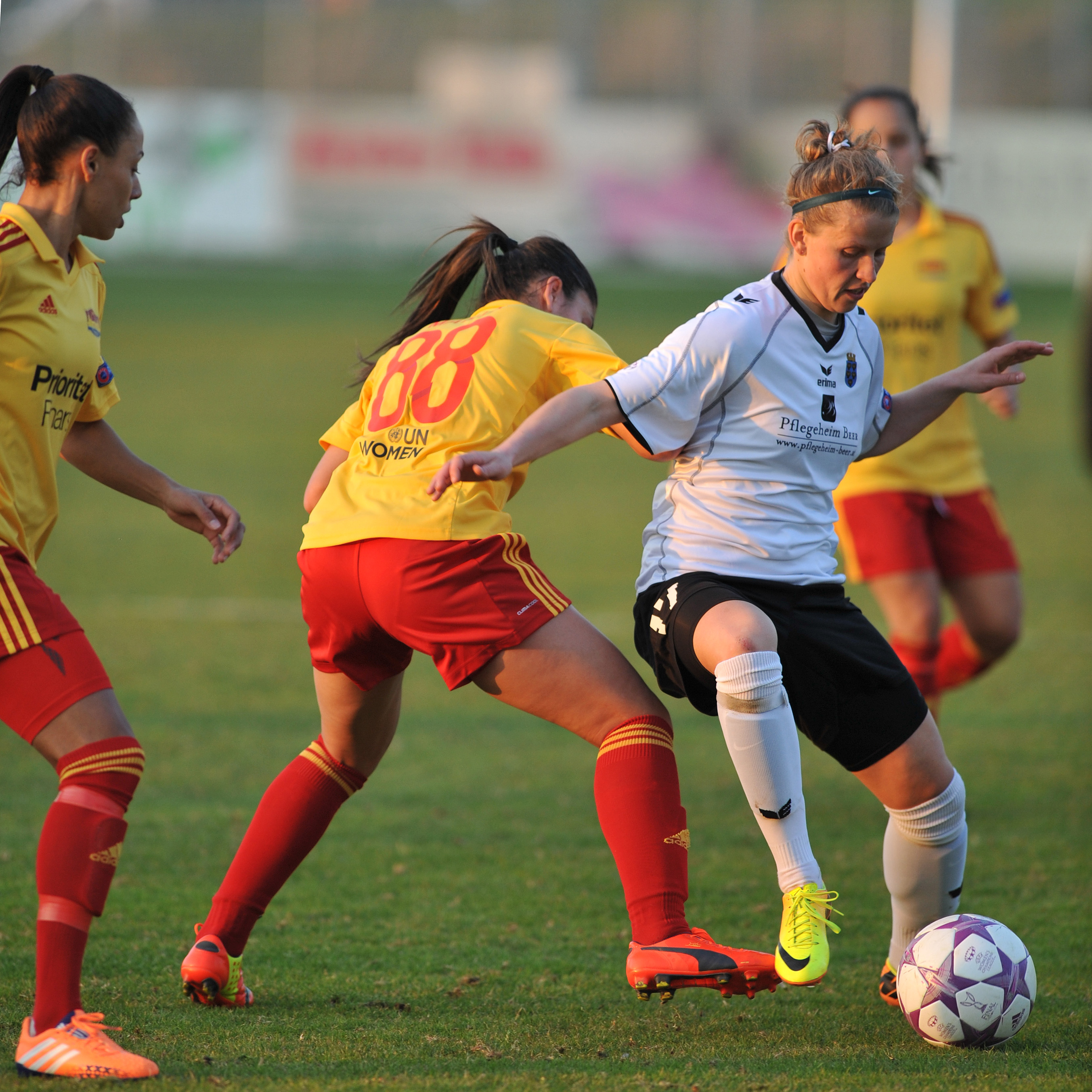
Playing against Tyresö in the UEFA Women's Champions League quarter-final, March 2014

Season	Competition	Stage	Result	Opponent
2003–04	UEFA Women's Cup	1QS	14–0	(Cyprus) PAOK Ledra
2003–04	UEFA Women's Cup	1QS	6–3	(Slovakia) Žiar nad Hronom
2003–04	UEFA Women's Cup	1QS	7–0	(North Macedonia) Lombardini Skopje
2003–04	UEFA Women's Cup	2QS	0–2	(Spain) Athletic Bilbao
2003–04	UEFA Women's Cup	2QS	1–7	(Germany) Frankfurt
2003–04	UEFA Women's Cup	2QS	1–0	(Portugal) 1º Dezembro
2004–05	UEFA Women's Cup	1QS	3–1	(Portugal) 1º Dezembro
2004–05	UEFA Women's Cup	1QS	0–7	(France) Montpellier
2004–05	UEFA Women's Cup	1QS	4–2	(Republic of Ireland) Univ. College Dublin
2005–06	UEFA Women's Cup	1QS	5–1	(Republic of Ireland) Univ. College Dublin
2005–06	UEFA Women's Cup	1QS	5–1	(Croatia) Dinamo Maksimir
2005–06	UEFA Women's Cup	1QS	0–0	(Italy) Bardolino
2005–06	UEFA Women's Cup	2QS	1–12	(Germany) Turbine Potsdam
2005–06	UEFA Women's Cup	2QS	0–4	(France) Montpellier
2005–06	UEFA Women's Cup	2QS	3–4	(Netherlands) Saestum
2006–07	UEFA Women's Cup	1QS	5–1	(Northern Ireland) Newtownabbey Strikers
2006–07	UEFA Women's Cup	1QS	0–3	(Iceland) Breiðablik
2006–07	UEFA Women's Cup	1QS	3–0	(Portugal) 1º Dezembro
2007–08	UEFA Women's Cup	1QS	4–3	(Scotland) Hibernian
2007–08	UEFA Women's Cup	1QS	3–0	(Republic of Ireland) Mayo Ladies League
2007–08	UEFA Women's Cup	1QS	8–1	(Poland) Gol Częstochowa
2007–08	UEFA Women's Cup	2QS	2–3	(Italy) Bardolino
2007–08	UEFA Women's Cup	2QS	0–7	(England) Arsenal
2007–08	UEFA Women's Cup	2QS	3–0	(Kazakhstan) Alma-KTZ
2008–09	UEFA Women's Cup	1QS	6–0	(Slovenia) Krka Novo Mesto
2008–09	UEFA Women's Cup	1QS	8–0	(Cyprus) Vamos Idaliou
2008–09	UEFA Women's Cup	1QS	4–0	(Portugal) 1º Dezembro
2008–09	UEFA Women's Cup	2QS	0–8	(France) Olympique Lyon
2008–09	UEFA Women's Cup	2QS	0–6	(England) Arsenal
2008–09	UEFA Women's Cup	2QS	5–3	(Switzerland) Zürich
2009–10	UEFA Women's Champions League	R32	3–1 0–1	(Poland) Unia Racibórz
2009–10	UEFA Women's Champions League	R16	1–4 1–4	(Italy) Torres
2010–11	UEFA Women's Champions League	R32	0–1 3–0	(Greece) PAOK Thessaloniki
2010–11	UEFA Women's Champions League	R16	0–7 0–9	(Germany) Turbine Potsdam
2011–12	UEFA Women's Champions League	R32	1–2 5–0	(Kazakhstan) CSHVSM Almaty
2011–12	UEFA Women's Champions League	R16	1–3 0–1	(Sweden) LdB Malmö
2012–13	UEFA Women's Champions League	R32	1–1 2–2	(Romania) Olimpia Cluj
2013–14	UEFA Women's Champions League	R32	2–1 1–1	(Cyprus) Apollon Limassol
2013–14	UEFA Women's Champions League	R16	3–0 3–0	(Turkey) Konak Belediyesi
2013–14	UEFA Women's Champions League	QF	1–8 0–0	(Sweden) Tyresö
2014–15	UEFA Women's Champions League	R32	2–1 2–2	(Hungary) MTK
2014–15	UEFA Women's Champions League	R16	0–4 0–7	(Germany) Wolfsburg

== Current squad ==
As of 20 November 2024

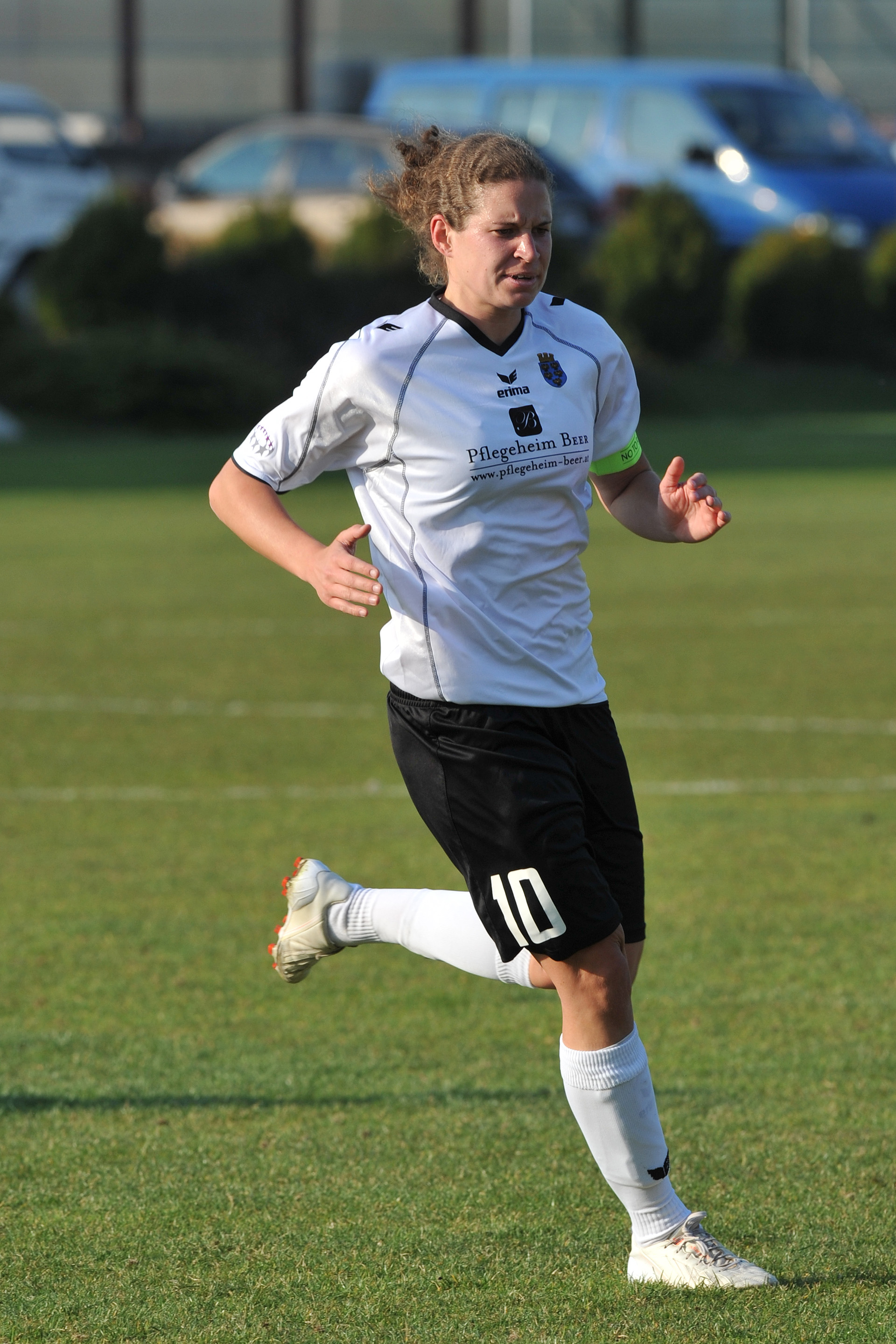
Former captain and club record goal-scorer Nina Burger

Note: Flags indicate national team as defined under FIFA eligibility rules; some limited exceptions apply. Players may hold more than one non-FIFA nationality.

No.	Pos.	Nation	Player
1	GK	AUT	Larissa Rusek
2	DF	AUT	Leonie Müller
6	MF	SVN	Kristína Panáková
7	MF	ITA	Elisa Pfattner
8	MF	BIH	Elma Smajić
9	DF	AUT	Tatjana Weiss (captain)
10	FW	CRO	Jelena Dordić
11	FW	AUT	Rebecca Schreiber
13	MF	AUT	Ines Sarac
15	DF	AUT	Laura Wondrejc
16	DF	AUT	Daniela Kittel
17	MF	AUT	Hannah Kunschert
18	FW	HUN	Grêta Bánfi
19	MF	AUT	Chiara Rattenschlager

No.	Pos.	Nation	Player
23	GK	AUT	Vivien Grabenhofer
25	DF	AUT	Evelin Kurz
26	MF	AUT	Nathalie Schieder
28	MF	AUT	Mariella Falkensteiner
29	FW	AUT	Besijana Pireci
30	DF	AUT	Julia Tabotta
31	GK	AUT	Sandrine Neidhardt
33	FW	AUT	Mara-Sophia Draxler
35	MF	AUT	Laura Wurzer
36	MF	AUT	Anna Holl
47	MF	AUT	Lilli Fischer
49	DF	AUT	Tanja Huber
70	MF	AUT	Victoria Schedl
77	MF	AUT	Laetitia Barabas
