= List of top-division football clubs in UEFA countries =

UEFA countries on this map of the world's six football confederations

The Union of European Football Associations (UEFA) is the administrative and controlling body for European football. It consists of 55 member associations, each of which is responsible for governing football in their respective countries.

All widely recognised sovereign states located entirely within Europe are members, with the exceptions of the United Kingdom, Monaco and Vatican City. Eight states partially or entirely outside Europe are also members: Armenia, Azerbaijan, Cyprus, Georgia, Israel, Kazakhstan, Russia and Turkey. The United Kingdom is divided into the four separate football associations of England, Northern Ireland, Scotland, and Wales; each association has a separate UEFA membership. The Faroe Islands, an autonomous country of the Kingdom of Denmark, also has its own football association which is a member of UEFA. The football association of Gibraltar, a British Overseas Territory, was approved as a member by UEFA in 2013. Kosovo was approved as a member in 2016, even though it is claimed by Serbia and is not recognised by several other UEFA member states.

Each UEFA member has its own football league system, except Liechtenstein. Clubs playing in each top-level league compete for the title as the country's club champions. Clubs also compete in the league and national cup competitions for places in the following season's UEFA club competitions, the UEFA Champions League, UEFA Europa League and UEFA Europa Conference League. Due to promotion and relegation, the clubs playing in the top-level league are different every season, except in San Marino and Gibraltar where there is only one level.

Some clubs play in a national football league other than their own country's. Where this is the case, the club is noted as such.

== UEFA coefficients ==
The UEFA league coefficients, also known as the UEFA rankings, are used to rank the leagues of Europe, and thus determine the number of clubs from a league that will participate in UEFA Champions League and UEFA Europa League. A country's ranking determines the number of teams competing in the season after the next; the 2009 rankings determined qualification for European competitions in the 2010–11 season.

A country's ranking is calculated based on the results of its clubs in UEFA competitions over the past five seasons. Two points are awarded for each win by a club, and one for a draw. If a game goes to extra time, the result at the end of time is used to calculate ranking points; if the match goes to a penalty shootout, it is considered to be a draw for the purposes of the coefficient system. The number of points awarded to a country's clubs are added together, and then divided by the number of clubs that participated in European competitions that season. This number is then rounded to three decimal places; two and two-thirds would become 2.667.

For the league coefficient the season's league coefficients for the last five seasons must be added up. In the preliminary rounds of both the Champions League and Europa League, the awarded points are halved. Bonus points for certain achievements are added to the number of points scored in a season. Bonus points are allocated for:

- Qualifying for the Champions League group phase. (4 bonus points)
- Reaching the second round of the Champions League. (5 bonus points)
- Reaching the quarter, semi and final of both Champions League and Europa League. (1 bonus point)

== Full list by country ==
=== Albania ===
- Football association: Albanian Football Association
- Top-level leagues: Kategoria Superiore (transl. Superior Category) and Kategoria Superiore Femra
- UEFA ranking: 44th and 16th
- "Superliga - Albania". Soccerway.

The top division of men's Albanian football was formed in 1930, and the inaugural title was won by SK Tirana (now known as KF Tirana). Tirana are the most successful team in the league's history, having won the competition on 24 occasions, followed by FK Dinamo Tirana (now playing in the second division) with 18 championships, and Partizani with 17. The league became affiliated with UEFA in 1954. Since the 2014–15 season, 10 teams compete in the division. The teams finishing in the bottom two places are relegated to the Albanian First Division and are replaced by the champions of each of that league's two groups.

The top division of women's Albania football was formed in 2009, and the inaugural title was won by Tirana AS (now KFF Tirana). KFF Vllaznia is the most successful team in the league's history, having won the competition the following 14 occasions, 3 of which were won by Ada (whose members, upon the team disbanding after the 2012/13 season, joined KFF Vllaznia)—this success includes an unbeaten run from 2013 until 2023. Since the 2022–23 season, 10 teams compete in the division. As of the 2024-25 season, teams finishing in the bottom six positions in the league participate in group play and a subsequent final play-off match to determine relegation.

Clubs and locations as of 2025–26 Kategoria Superiore season and clubs of 2025–26 Kategoria Superiore Femra season:

2025–26 Kategoria Superiore teams.

Pos	Team	Pld	Pts
1	Vllaznia	36	63
2	Elbasani	36	62
3	Egnatia (C)	36	57
4	Dinamo City	36	49
5	Partizani	36	48
6	Tirana	36	44
7	Vora	36	42
8	Teuta (O)	36	42
9	Bylis (R)	36	41
10	Flamurtari (R)	36	36

Source: Albanian Football Association
(C) Champions; (O) Play-off winners; (R) Relegated

Pos	Team	Pld	Pts	EGN	ELB	VLL	DIN
1	Egnatia (C)	3	37				2–0
2	Elbasani	3	37	0–4			3–0
3	Vllaznia	3	31	1–2	1–2		0–2
4	Dinamo City	3	27				

Source: Albanian Football Association
Legend: Blue = home team win; Yellow = draw; Red = away team win.
(C) Champions

Pos	Team	Pld	Pts
1	Vllaznia (C)	16	46
2	Apolonia	16	38
3	Gramshi	16	35
4	Teuta	16	31
5	Partizani	16	24
6	Kinostudio	16	16
7	Egnatia	16	13
8	Atletik Klub	16	7
9	Lushnja	16	1

Source: Albanian Football Association
(C) Champions

=== Andorra ===
- Country: Andorra
- Football association: Andorran Football Federation
- Top-level league: Andorran First Division (Catalan: Primera Divisió)
- UEFA ranking: 49th
- "1a Divisió - Andorra". Soccerway. Archived from the original on 7 February 2013.

Andorra's national league system was formed in 1993, and the Andorran Football Federation gained UEFA membership in 1996. Records from the league's first three seasons are incomplete, but FC Santa Coloma have won more First Division titles than any other team, with at least 13.

Another Andorran football club, FC Andorra, play in the Spanish football league system. In recent years, ten teams have competed in the First Division. The eight clubs that play in the league play each other three times in the same venue. After the first 21 rounds, the league splits in half, into a top four and bottom four. They then play the other three teams in their section twice more to give a total of 27 games. The last placed of the relegation round is relegated to Second Division, the second highest football league in Andorra, while the penultimate classified play a two-legged relegation play-off against the runners-up of Segona Divisió.

Clubs and locations as of 2025–26 season:

Locations of the 2025–26 Primera Divisió teams

Pos	Team	Pld	Pts
1	Inter Club d'Escaldes (C)	24	54
2	UE Santa Coloma (R)	24	51
3	Rànger's	24	48
4	FC Santa Coloma	24	44
5	Atlètic Club d'Escaldes	24	34
6	Penya Encarnada	24	24
7	Ordino	24	22
8	Carroi	24	17
9	Esperança (O)	24	11
10	Pas de la Casa (D, R)	0	0

Source: Flashscore
(C) Champions; (D) Disqualified; (O) Play-off winners; (R) Relegated

=== Armenia ===
- Country: Armenia
- Football association: Football Federation of Armenia
- Top-level league: Armenian Premier League (Armenian: "Բարձրագույն Խումբ")
- UEFA Ranking: 34th
- "Premier League - Armenia". Soccerway. Archived from the original on 7 February 2013.

Armenia gained independence in 1991, following the break-up of the Soviet Union. Organised football had been played in Armenia since 1936, as part of the Soviet football system. The Football Federation of Armenia gained UEFA affiliation in 1992, and the league ran as the national championship for the first time in the same year. Since independence, the country's most successful team is Pyunik, who has won 16 league titles.

Clubs and locations as of 2025–26 season:

Locations of the teams

Pos	Team	Pld	Pts
1	Ararat-Armenia (C)	27	60
2	Noah	27	56
3	Pyunik	27	55
4	Alashkert	27	53
5	Urartu	27	49
6	Van	27	31
7	BKMA	27	23
8	Gandzasar Kapan	27	21
9	Ararat Yerevan	27	13
10	Shirak	27	13

Source: FFA
(C) Champions

=== Austria ===
- Country: Austria
- Football association: Austrian Football Association
- Top-level leagues: Austrian Football Bundesliga (German: Österreichische Fußball-Bundesliga) and ÖFB Frauen Bundesliga
- UEFA ranking: 17th and 10th
- "Bundesliga - Austria". Soccerway. Archived from the original on 7 February 2013.

The ÖFB Frauen Bundesliga was founded in 1982, making it one of the oldest women's football leagues in Europe.

Clubs and locations as of 2024–25 ÖFB Frauen Bundesliga season and 2025–26 Austrian Football Bundesliga season:

Locations of teams in the 2024–25 ÖFB Bundesliga.

Pos	Team	Pld	W	D	L	GF	GA	GD	Pts	Qualification
1	SKN St. Pölten	18	14	3	1	53	8	+45	45	Advances to the championship round
2	FK Austria Wien	18	12	4	2	42	6	+36	40	Advances to the championship round
3	First Vienna FC	18	10	3	5	31	23	+8	33	Advances to the championship round
4	SK Sturm Graz	18	9	4	5	24	16	+8	31	Advances to the championship round
5	SCR Altach	18	7	1	10	23	30	−7	22	Participates in the qualification round
6	FC Bergheim	18	4	9	5	12	16	−4	21	Participates in the qualification round
7	SV Neulengbach	18	5	5	8	15	25	−10	20	Participates in the qualification round
8	Blau-Weiß Linz/Union Kleinmünchen (Note: The two clubs operate the women's team jointly.)	18	5	1	12	14	37	−23	16	Participates in the qualification round
9	Lustenau/Dornbirn	18	3	4	11	12	36	−24	13	Participates in the qualification round
10	Linzer ASK	18	4	0	14	17	46	−29	12	Participates in the qualification round

Updated to match(es) played on 23 March 2025. Source: OEFB.at
Rules for classification: 1) Points; 2) Goal difference; 3) Number of goals scored; 4) Head-to-head points; 5) Head-to-head goal difference; 6) Head-to-head away goals scored;
Notes:
Location of teams in the 2025–26 Austrian Football Bundesliga

Pos	Team	Pld	Pts
1	Sturm Graz	22	38
2	Red Bull Salzburg	22	37
3	LASK	22	37
4	Austria Wien	22	36
5	SK Rapid	22	33
6	TSV Hartberg	22	33
7	WSG Tirol	22	31
8	SCR Altach	22	29
9	SV Ried	22	28
10	Wolfsberger	22	26
11	Grazer AK	22	20
12	Blau-Weiß Linz	22	15

Source: Austrian Football Bundesliga

Pos	Team	Pld	Pts	LSK	STU	RBS	AWI	RWI	HAR
1	LASK (C)	32	39	—	1–1	2–1	4–1	3–1	0–0
2	Sturm Graz	32	37	1–1	—	1–1	1–1	2–0	0–0
3	Red Bull Salzburg	32	29	2–3	1–1	—	3–1	0–1	1–3
4	Austria Wien	32	29	0–3	2–5	1–3	—	1–1	1–0
5	SK Rapid (O)	32	27	4–2	0–2	1–0	0–2	—	0–2
6	Hartberg	32	25	1–5	2–4	1–2	0–1	2–2	—

Source: Austrian Football Bundesliga
Legend: Blue = home team win; Yellow = draw; Red = away team win.
(C) Champions; (O) Play-off winners

Pos	Team	Pld	Pts	RIE	WAC	ALT	GAK	TIR	BWL
1	Ried	32	28	—	0–1	3–2	2–0	2–1	2–0
2	Wolfsberger AC	32	28	0–0	—	1–1	1–0	2–0	0–0
3	Rheindorf Altach	32	27	2–0	1–4	—	1–0	0–0	3–1
4	Grazer AK	32	27	1–1	2–0	2–2	—	4–0	2–1
5	WSG Tirol	32	24	1–0	3–1	2–2	1–5	—	1–1
6	Blau-Weiß Linz (R)	32	21	3–2	3–0	3–0	0–3	5–0	—

Source: Austrian Football Bundesliga
Legend: Blue = home team win; Yellow = draw; Red = away team win.
(R) Relegated

=== Azerbaijan ===
- Country: Azerbaijan
- Football association: Association of Football Federations of Azerbaijan
- Top-level league: Azerbaijan Premier League (Azerbaijani: Azərbaycan Premyer Liqası)
- UEFA ranking: 26th
- "Premyer Liqa - Azerbaijan". Soccerway. Archived from the original on 7 February 2013.

Although the country was part of the Soviet Union, the first Azerbaijan-wide football competition took place in 1928, and became an annual occurrence from 1934. Following the break-up of the Soviet Union in 1991, the first independent Azeri championship took place in 1992, and the Association of Football Federations of Azerbaijan gained UEFA affiliation in 1994 Since independence, the country's most successful team is Qarabağ, with eleven league titles.

Clubs and locations as of 2025–26 season:

Locations of the 2025–26 Azerbaijan Premier League teams.

Pos	Team	Pld	Pts
1	Sabah (C)	33	78
2	Qarabağ	33	69
3	Turan Tovuz	33	59
4	Neftçi	33	59
5	Zira	33	53
6	Araz-Naxçıvan	33	46
7	Sumgayit	33	41
8	Shamakhi	33	38
9	Imishli	33	34
10	Kapaz	33	27
11	Gabala (O)	33	27
12	Karvan (R)	33	15

Source: Soccerway
(C) Champions; (O) Play-off winners; (R) Relegated

=== Belarus ===
- Country: Belarus
- Football association: Football Federation of Belarus
- Top-level league: Belarusian Premier League (Belarusian: Вышэйшая ліга)
- UEFA ranking: 50th
- "Premier League - Belarus". Soccerway. Archived from the original on 7 February 2013.

Belarus declared independence from the Soviet Union in 1990. Its independence was widely recognised within Europe in 1991, an independent national championship began in 1992, and UEFA membership followed in 1993. Through the 2018 season, the most successful team is BATE Borisov, with 15 league championships. The 2016 season saw the league expand from 14 teams to 16, accomplished by promoting three clubs from the Belarusian First League and relegating only the last-place team in the 2015 Premier League. At the end of the season, the bottom two teams are relegated to the First League and replaced by that league's top two finishers.

Clubs and locations as of 2026 season:

Locations of the 2026 Belarusian Premier League teams

Pos	Team	Pld	Pts
1	Maxline Vitebsk (X)	28	62
2	Isloch Minsk Raion (X)	28	61
3	Dinamo Minsk (X)	28	61
4	Dynamo Brest	28	51
5	Neman Grodno	28	49
6	Gomel	28	43
7	Vitebsk	28	40
8	Torpedo-BelAZ Zhodino	28	36
9	Minsk	28	35
10	Slavia Mozyr	28	34
11	Baranovichi	28	31
12	Arsenal Dzerzhinsk	28	27
13	Belshina Bobruisk	28	24
14	BATE Borisov	28	24
15	Dnepr Mogilev	28	23
16	Naftan Novopolotsk (R)	28	17

Updated to match(es) played on 8 November 2026. Source: Soccerway
(R) Relegated; (X) Guaranteed at least Conference League

=== Belgium ===
- Country: Belgium
- Football association: Royal Belgian Football Association
- Top-level league: Belgian Pro League (French: Championnat de Belgique de football, Dutch: Eerste klasse België, German: Erste Division Belgien)
- UEFA ranking: 8th
- "Pro League - Belgium". Soccerway.

Organised football reached Belgium in the 19th century; the Royal Belgian Football Association was founded in 1895, and FC Liégeois became the country's first champions the following year. Belgium joined European football's governing body, UEFA, upon its formation in 1954. Historically the country's most successful team are Anderlecht, with 34 league titles as of 2024. The Belgian First Division A, historically known as the First Division and also known as the Pro League from 2008 to 2009 through 2015–16, currently consists of 16 teams. Initially, each team plays the other clubs twice for a total of 30 matches. At this point, the league proceeds as follows (as of the current 2025–26 season):

- The top six teams take half of their points (rounded up) into a championship play-off, playing each other two further times to determine the national champion.
- The relegation play-off is played between the teams ranked 13th and 16th after the regular season. After the relegation play-off battle, two teams are relegated directly to the Challenger Pro League and one team will play against 3rd place of Challenger Pro League due to avoid relegation.

Clubs and locations as of 2025–26 season:

Locations of the 2025–26 Belgian Pro League teams

Pos	Team	Pld	Pts
1	Union SG	30	66
2	Club Brugge	30	63
3	Sint-Truiden	30	57
4	Gent	30	45
5	Mechelen	30	45
6	Anderlecht	30	44
7	Genk	30	42
8	Standard Liège	30	40
9	Westerlo	30	39
10	Antwerp	30	35
11	Charleroi	30	34
12	OH Leuven	30	34
13	Zulte Waregem	30	32
14	Cercle Brugge	30	31
15	La Louvière	30	31
16	Dender EH	30	19

Source: Jupiler Pro League (in Dutch)

Pos	Team	Pld	Pts	CLU	USG	STR	AND	GNT	MEC
1	Club Brugge (C)	10	57	—	5–0	2–0	4–2	5–0	6–1
2	Union SG	10	53	2–1	—	1–0	5–1	0–0	3–0
3	Sint-Truiden	10	43	1–2	2–1	—	2–0	1–1	3–0
4	Anderlecht	10	33	1–3	1–3	3–1	—	3–1	2–2
5	Gent (O)	10	29	0–2	0–0	0–0	1–1	—	1–1
6	Mechelen	10	29	2–2	0–1	1–4	1–2	1–0	—

Source: Jupiler Pro League (in Dutch), Soccerway
Legend: Blue = home team win; Yellow = draw; Red = away team win.
(C) Champions; (O) Play-off winners

Pos	Team	Pld	Pts	GNK	STA	CHA	WES	ANT	OHL
1	Genk	10	38	—	1–1	1–1	3–0	0–0	0–0
2	Standard Liège	10	37	0–0	—	0–2	1–2	1–2	2–1
3	Charleroi	10	34	2–0	1–2	—	0–1	2–1	1–1
4	Westerlo	10	33	1–2	1–2	2–0	—	2–4	3–3
5	Antwerp	10	31	1–2	0–5	0–1	2–0	—	2–0
6	OH Leuven	10	23	0–2	1–3	0–2	0–2	3–0	—

Source: Jupiler Pro League (in Dutch), Soccerway
Legend: Blue = home team win; Yellow = draw; Red = away team win.

Pos	Team	Pld	Pts	ZWA	CER	LAL	DEN
1	Zulte Waregem	6	48	—	2–2	4–0	2–1
2	Cercle Brugge	6	41	2–3	—	3–0	2–1
3	La Louvière	6	34	0–2	4–1	—	0–1
4	Dender EH (R)	6	25	1–2	1–4	2–1	—

Source: Jupiler Pro League (in Dutch), Soccerway
Legend: Blue = home team win; Yellow = draw; Red = away team win.
(R) Relegated

=== Bosnia and Herzegovina ===
- Country: Bosnia and Herzegovina
- Football association: Football Association of Bosnia and Herzegovina
- Top-level league: Premier League of Bosnia and Herzegovina (Bosnian: Premijer liga Bosne i Hercegovine)
- UEFA ranking: 38th
- "Premier Liga - Bosnia-Herzegovina". Soccerway. Archived from the original on 7 February 2013.

Prior to gaining independence from Yugoslavia, clubs from Bosnia and Herzegovina were eligible to compete in the Yugoslav First League, which they won three times. The country gained independence in 1992, and its Football Association gained UEFA membership in 1998. Due to political tensions between Bosniaks, Bosnian Serbs and Bosnian Croats, the country did not have a single national top division until the 2002–03 season, but rather two or three. Since then, Zrinjski Mostar have won eight titles, Sarajevo have won four, Željezničar have won three, Borac have won three, Široki Brijeg have won twice and two other teams have won it once each.

Since the 2016–17 season, the Premier League has consisted of 12 clubs, reduced from 16 in previous seasons. The 2016–17 season was the first for a two-stage season. In the first stage, each team played all others home and away, after which the league split into two six-team groups that also played home and away. The top six teams played for the championship and European qualifying places; the bottom six played to avoid relegation. At the end of the second stage, the bottom two clubs of the relegation group dropped to either the First League of the Federation of Bosnia and Herzegovina or the First League of the Republika Srpska. Since the 2018–19 season, the league is not played as the one in the 2016–17 season. Actually very simple, after all the 12 clubs play each other two times, once home and once away, they play each other three times, also playing home or away depending on how the schedule is made. With that, the league season has 33 full rounds instead of the 22 rounds and an additional 10 rounds in the relegation and championship games.

Clubs and locations as of 2025–26 season:

Locations of the 2025–26 Premier League of BiH clubs

Pos	Team	Pld	Pts
1	Borac Banja Luka (C)	36	86
2	Zrinjski Mostar	36	71
3	Sarajevo	36	65
4	Velež Mostar	36	51
5	Široki Brijeg	36	45
6	Željezničar	36	42
7	Radnik Bijeljina	36	35
8	Sloga Doboj	36	34
9	Posušje (R)	36	34
10	Rudar Prijedor (R)	36	30

Source: Rezultati.com
(C) Champions; (R) Relegated

=== Bulgaria ===
- Country: Bulgaria
- Football association: Bulgarian Football Union
- Top-level league: First Professional Football League (Bulgarian: Първа професионална футболна лига; short form "Parva Liga" [Първа лига])
- UEFA ranking: 29th
- "A PFG - Bulgaria". Soccerway. Archived from the original on 7 February 2013.

A national Bulgarian championship has been held in every year since 1924, although the 1924, 1927 and 1944 seasons were not completed. The country gained UEFA membership in 1954. Historically, the most successful teams in Bulgarian football have been CSKA Sofia, Levski Sofia and Ludogorets Razgrad; no other team has won more than ten league titles. In recent years, Ludogorets Razgrad has dominated the league; although the team did not make its first appearance in the top flight until 2011–12, it has won the championship in each of its first thirteen seasons at that level. The 2015–16 season was intended to have 12 teams, but was reduced to 10 after four clubs (the two clubs that would otherwise have been promoted to what was then known as the A Group, plus two from the previous season's A Group) were denied professional licenses. Following that season, the Bulgarian Football Union revamped the country's professional league structure, expanding the top flight to 14 teams and changing that league's name from "A Group" to "First League".

Under the current structure that began in 2024, each team plays the others twice, once at each club's stadium. After the regular season concludes, the league would split into a top four group to determine the champion and European competition places, a second group for teams ranked fifth through eight to determine the team that would compete in the playoffs for UEFA Conference League (team that finished fourth in the top group would play against the fifth-placed team), as well as a bottom eight group consisting of teams competing to avoid relegation, with the last two teams being directly relegated, while the 14th and 15th placed teams would compete in a playoff against the third and fourth placed teams from the Second League.

Clubs and locations as of 2025–26 season:

Location of teams in 2025–26 First League
Sofia 2025–26First League football clubs

Pos	Team	Pld	Pts
1	Levski Sofia	30	70
2	Ludogorets	30	60
3	CSKA 1948	30	59
4	CSKA Sofia	30	56
5	Lokomotiv Plovdiv	30	46
6	Cherno More	30	44
7	Arda	30	44
8	Botev Plovdiv	30	40
9	Slavia Sofia	30	39
10	Botev Vratsa	30	38
11	Lokomotiv Sofia	30	37
12	Spartak Varna	30	27
13	Dobrudzha	30	26
14	Septemvri Sofia	30	26
15	Beroe	30	23
16	Montana	30	17

Source: Soccerway, Bulgarian Football

Pos	Team	Pld	Pts
1	Levski Sofia (C)	36	81
2	CSKA 1948	36	67
3	Ludogorets (O)	36	67
4	CSKA Sofia	36	63

Source: soccerway, Bulgarian Football
(C) Champions; (O) Play-off winners

Pos	Team	Pld	Pts
5	Lokomotiv Plovdiv	36	55
6	Arda	36	54
7	Cherno More	36	54
8	Botev Plovdiv	36	46

Source: soccerway, Bulgarian Football

Pos	Team	Pld	Pts
9	Botev Vratsa	37	53
10	Lokomotiv Sofia	37	47
11	Slavia Sofia	37	46
12	Spartak Varna	37	37
13	Septemvri Sofia (O)	37	36
14	Beroe (R)	37	34
15	Dobrudzha (R)	37	31
16	Montana (R)	37	23

Source: soccerway, Bulgarian Football
(O) Play-off winners; (R) Relegated

=== Croatia ===
- Country: Croatia
- Football association: Croatian Football Federation
- Top-level league: Croatian Football League (Croatian: Hrvatska nogometna liga)
- UEFA ranking: 21st
- "1. HNL - Croatia". Soccerway. Archived from the original on 8 February 2013.

National Croatian leagues were organised in 1914 and during the Second World War, but during peacetime Croatia's biggest clubs competed in the Yugoslav First League. After Croatia declared independence from Yugoslavia in 1991, a national football league was formed in 1992, and the Croatian Football Federation gained UEFA membership in 1993. Since its formation, the Croatian First League has been dominated by Dinamo Zagreb and Hajduk Split; as of the end of the 2023–24 season, one of these teams has won the title in all but two of the league's 33 seasons. Since the 2013–14 season, the First League has consisted of 10 teams. At the end of the season, the 10th-placed team is relegated directly to the second division, while the 9th-placed team enters a relegation play-off.

Clubs and locations as of 2025–26 season:

Locations of teams in 2025–26 HNL

Pos	Team	Pld	Pts
1	Dinamo Zagreb (C)	36	86
2	Hajduk Split	36	68
3	Varaždin	36	54
4	Rijeka	36	53
5	Lokomotiva	36	44
6	Istra 1961	36	43
7	Gorica	36	41
8	Slaven Belupo	36	41
9	Osijek	36	35
10	Vukovar 1991 (R)	36	28

Source: SuperSport HNL
(C) Champions; (R) Relegated

=== Cyprus ===
- Country: Cyprus
- Football association: Cyprus Football Association
- Top-level league: Cypriot First Division (Greek: Πρωτάθλημα Α' Κατηγορίας, Turkish: Kıbrıs Birinci Ligi)
- UEFA ranking: 15th
- "1. Division - Cyprus". Soccerway. Archived from the original on 8 February 2013.

Clubs and locations as of 2025–26 season:

Locations of the 2025–26 Cypriot First Division teams.

Pos	Team	Pld	Pts
1	Omonia	26	61
2	AEK Larnaca	26	53
3	Apollon Limassol	26	53
4	Pafos	26	51
5	APOEL	26	45
6	Aris Limassol	26	43
7	Omonia Aradippou	26	34
8	AEL Limassol	26	33
9	Anorthosis Famagusta	26	32
10	Krasava	26	28
11	Olympiakos Nicosia	26	28
12	Akritas Chlorakas	26	26
13	Ethnikos Achna	26	23
14	Enosis Neon Paralimni	26	1

Source: Cyprus Football Association

Pos	Team	Pld	Pts	OMO	AEK	APL	PAF	APO	ARI
1	Omonia (C)	36	87	—	1–1	5–2	2–0	2–0	3–0
2	AEK Larnaca	36	69	0–2	—	1–0	2–2	1–0	2–0
3	Apollon Limassol	36	67	2–3	1–1	—	2–1	2–0	3–2
4	Pafos	36	62	0–2	1–1	1–1	—	2–0	2–0
5	APOEL	36	52	0–3	1–0	2–3	3–3	—	2–1
6	Aris Limassol	36	51	2–2	3–4	3–0	1–1	1–0	—

Source: Soccerway
Legend: Blue = home team win; Yellow = draw; Red = away team win.
(C) Champions

Pos	Team	Pld	Pts	ANO	AEL	OAR	KRA	OLY	AKR	ETH	ENO
7	Anorthosis Famagusta	33	45	—		1–1	5–2		3–2	—	2–0
8	AEL Limassol	33	44	0–1	—	—		1–3		1–1	2–1
9	Omonia Aradippou	33	42		0–3	—	1–1		2–1		1–2
10	Krasava	33	40		1–1		—	1–0	—	3–1	0–0
11	Olympiakos Nicosia	33	40	1–0		2–1	—	—	0–1		—
12	Akritas Chlorakas (R)	33	35	—	1–2		0–2		—	1–0	
13	Ethnikos Achna (R)	33	33	1–0	—	1–2		2–1		—	
14	Enosis Neon Paralimni (R)	33	5			—		1–3	1–2	1–3	—

Source: Soccerway
Legend: Blue = home team win; Yellow = draw; Red = away team win.
(R) Relegated

=== Czech Republic ===
- Country: Czech Republic
- Football association: Football Association of the Czech Republic
- Top-level league: Czech First League (Czech: 1. česká fotbalová liga)
- UEFA ranking: 10th
- "Czech Liga - Czech Republic". Soccerway. Archived from the original on 7 February 2013.

The history of the Czech football league began with its reorganization for the 1993–94 season following the dissolution of Czechoslovakia and therefore the league became the successor of the Czechoslovak League. Thirty-five clubs have competed in the Czech First League since its founding. Sparta Prague has won the title 14 times, the most among Czech clubs and are the reigning champions. Other clubs that were crowned as champions are Slavia Prague, Slovan Liberec, Baník Ostrava and Viktoria Plzeň.

Clubs and locations as of 2025–26 season:

Locations of the 2025–26 Czech First League teams

Pos	Team	Pld	Pts
1	Slavia Prague	30	71
2	Sparta Prague	30	63
3	Viktoria Plzeň	30	53
4	Jablonec	30	51
5	Hradec Králové	30	49
6	Slovan Liberec	30	46
7	Sigma Olomouc	30	43
8	Pardubice	30	41
9	Karviná	30	39
10	Bohemians 1905	30	36
11	Mladá Boleslav	30	35
12	Zlín	30	34
13	Teplice	30	29
14	Dukla Prague	30	23
15	Slovácko	30	23
16	Baník Ostrava	30	22

Source: Chance Liga

Pos	Team	Pld	Pts	SLA	SPA	PLZ	HKR	JAB	LIB
1	Slavia Prague (C)	35	80	—	0–3 (Note: Match was abandoned at 3–2 to Slavia Prague in stoppage time after Slavia fans stormed the pitch. On 12 May, the League Football Association awarded a 3–0 win to Sparta.)	3–0	—	5–1	—
2	Sparta Prague	35	76	—	—	0–0	2–1	2–0	—
3	Viktoria Plzeň	35	63	—	—	—	3–1	5–0	2–0
4	Hradec Králové	35	56	3–1	—	—	—	—	1–0
5	Jablonec	35	55	—	—	—	1–1	—	2–1
6	Slovan Liberec	35	46	1–2	0–2	—	—	—	—

Source: Chance Liga
Legend: Blue = home team win; Yellow = draw; Red = away team win.
(C) Champions

Pos	Team	Pld	Pts	TEP	ZLN	MLA	SLO	OST	DUK
11	Teplice	35	42	—	—	—	1–1	2–1	2–0
12	Zlín	35	41	2–4	—	—	1–0	—	2–1
13	Mladá Boleslav	35	40	0–2	1–1	—	—	—	1–2
14	Slovácko (O)	35	30	—	—	0–3	—	2–1	—
15	Baník Ostrava (O)	35	29	—	2–0	0–0	—	—	—
16	Dukla Prague (R)	35	26	—	—	—	0–1	0–3	—

Source: Chance Liga
Legend: Blue = home team win; Yellow = draw; Red = away team win.
(O) Play-off winners; (R) Relegated

=== Denmark ===
- Country: Denmark
- Football association: Danish Football Association
- Top-level league: Danish Superliga (Danish: Superligaen)
- UEFA ranking: 13th
- "Superliga - Denmark". Soccerway. Archived from the original on 7 February 2013.

Clubs and locations as of 2025–26 season:

Locations of the Danish Superliga 2025–26 teams

Pos	Team	Pld	Pts
1	AGF	22	50
2	Midtjylland	22	46
3	Sønderjyske	22	36
4	Brøndby	22	34
5	Viborg	22	33
6	Nordsjælland	22	31
7	Copenhagen	22	29
8	OB	22	27
9	Randers	22	26
10	Fredericia	22	24
11	Silkeborg	22	19
12	Vejle	22	14

Source: Danish Football Association (in Danish), Soccerway

=== England ===
- Country: England
- Football association: The Football Association
- Top-level league: Premier League
- UEFA ranking: 1st
- "Premier League - England". Soccerway. Archived from the original on 7 February 2013.

Founded in 1888, the Football League was the world's first national football league. The inaugural competition was won by Preston North End, who remained unbeaten throughout the entire season. It was the top-level football league in England from its foundation until 1992, when the 22 clubs comprising the First Division resigned from the Football League to form the new FA Premier League. As of the 2019–20 season the Premier League comprises 20 clubs; each team plays every other team twice, with the bottom 3 clubs at the end of the season relegated to the EFL Championship. The most successful domestic club is Manchester United, who have won the league 20 times, while the most successful English club in Europe is Liverpool, who have won 6 European Cups, 3 UEFA Cups and 4 UEFA Super Cups, more than any other English team.

Clubs and locations as of 2025–26 season:

Locations of the 2025–26 Premier League teams
Greater London Premier League football clubs

Pos	Team	Pld	Pts
1	Arsenal (C)	38	85
2	Manchester City	38	78
3	Manchester United	38	71
4	Aston Villa	38	65
5	Liverpool	38	60
6	Bournemouth	38	57
7	Sunderland	38	54
8	Brighton & Hove Albion	38	53
9	Brentford	38	53
10	Chelsea	38	52
11	Fulham	38	52
12	Newcastle United	38	49
13	Everton	38	49
14	Leeds United	38	47
15	Crystal Palace	38	45
16	Nottingham Forest	38	44
17	Tottenham Hotspur	38	41
18	West Ham United (R)	38	39
19	Burnley (R)	38	22
20	Wolverhampton Wanderers (R)	38	20

Source: Premier League
(C) Champions; (R) Relegated

=== Estonia ===
- Country: Estonia
- Football association: Estonian Football Association
- Top-level league: Estonian Premium Liiga (Estonian: Meistriliiga)
- UEFA ranking: 43rd
- "Meistriliiga - Estonia". Soccerway. Archived from the original on 7 February 2013.

An independent Estonian league took place between 1921 and 1940. However, after the Second World War it became part of the Soviet Union, and became a regional system. Estonia regained independence after the dissolution of the USSR, organising the first national championship in 52 years in 1992, the same year that the Estonian Football Association joined UEFA. FC Flora is the most successful team in the modern era, with 15 league titles as of the end of the 2014 season. Since 2005, the Premier Division has consisted of 10 teams, which play one another four times. At the end of the season the bottom team is relegated to the second level of Estonian football, while the ninth-placed team enters into a relegation playoff.

Clubs and locations as of 2026 season:

Locations of the 2026 Meistriliiga teams
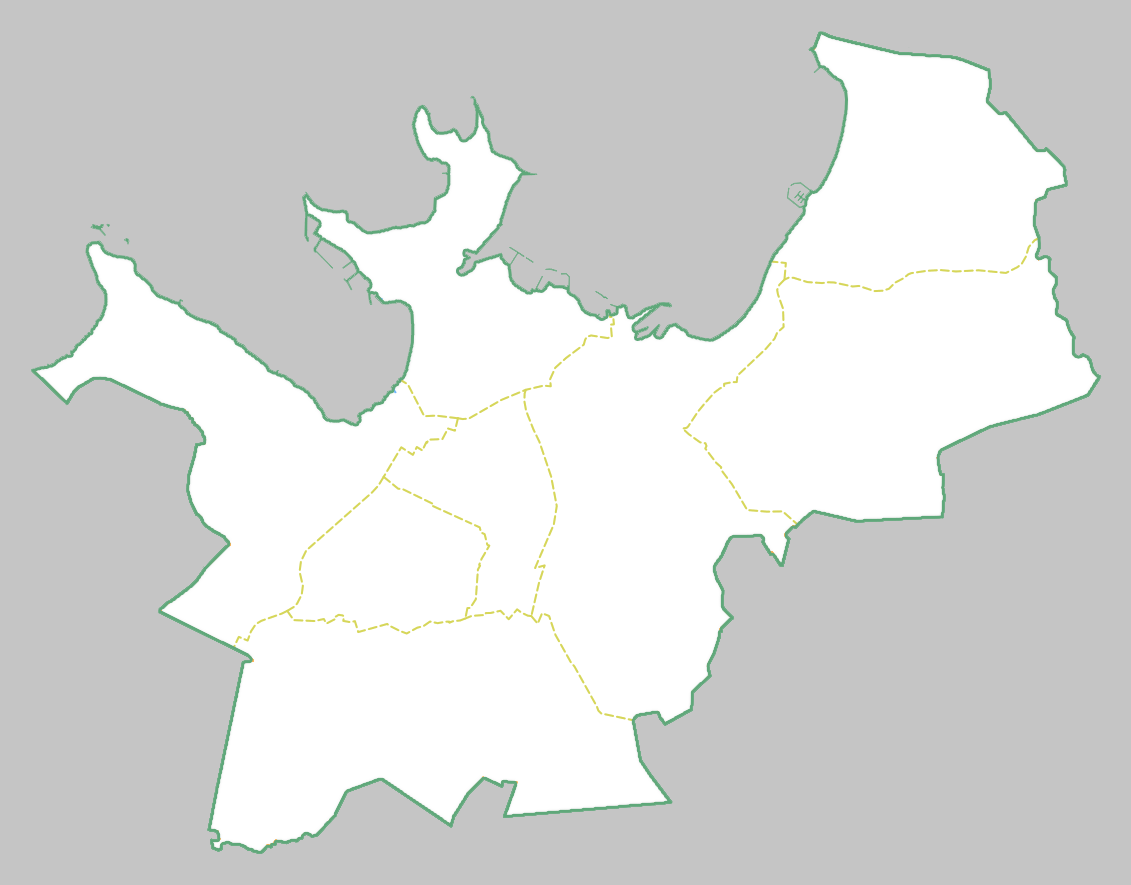
Locations of the 2026 Meistriliiga teams in Tallinn

Pos	Team	Pld	Pts
1	FCI Levadia (C)	36	91
2	Paide Linnameeskond	36	64
3	Flora	36	62
4	Nõmme Kalju	36	61
5	Tammeka	36	53
6	Harju	36	47
7	Vaprus	36	40
8	Nõmme United	36	38
9	Kuressaare (Q)	36	37
10	Narva Trans (R)	36	23

Source: A. Le Coq Premium liiga
(C) Champions; (Q) Qualified for the phase indicated; (R) Relegated

=== Faroe Islands ===
- Country: Faroe Islands
- Football association: Faroe Islands Football Association
- Top-level league: Faroe Islands Premier League (Faroese: Effodeildin)
- UEFA ranking: 40th
- "Meistaradeildin - Faroe Islands". Soccerway. Archived from the original on 7 February 2013.

The Faroe Islands are a constituent country of the Kingdom of Denmark, which also comprises Greenland and Denmark itself. The league was formed in 1942, and has been contested annually since, with the exception of 1944 due to a lack of available balls. The Faroe Islands gained UEFA recognition in 1992. The most successful teams are HB and KI, with 24 and 21 Premier League titles respectively as of the most recently completed 2024 season. Since the 1988 season, the Premier League has consisted of 10 teams. They play each other three times, with the bottom two teams relegated to the First Division.

Clubs and locations as of 2026 season:

Locations of the 2026 Betri deidin menn teams

2026 Faroe Islands Premier League

=== Finland ===
- Country: Finland
- Football association: Football Association of Finland
- Top-level league: Finnish Premier League (Finnish: Veikkausliiga, Swedish: Tipsligan)
- UEFA ranking: 35th
- "Veikkausliiga - Finland". Soccerway. Archived from the original on 7 February 2013.

Finland's current league has been contested annually since 1898, with the exceptions of 1914 and 1943. The most successful team are HJK with 33 titles; as of 2024, no other team has won 10 or more. However, between 1920 and 1948 a rival championship operated, organised by the Finnish Workers' Sports Federation. Frequent champions in that competition before it came under the jurisdiction of the Football Association of Finland included Kullervo Helsinki, Vesa Helsinki and Tampereen Pallo-Veikot. The Premier League consists of 12 teams. Since 2019 season teams play one another two times, then the top 6 teams play the championship round, and the bottom 6 the relegation round. At the end of the season the bottom club is relegated to the First Division, and the second-last club contests a in a play-off with the 2nd team of the First Division.

Clubs and locations as of 2026 season:

Location of teams in 2026 Veikkausliiga

Pos	Team	Pld	Pts
1	KuPS	22	43
2	Inter Turku	22	42
3	HJK	22	37
4	IF Gnistan	22	36
5	AC Oulu	22	34
6	VPS	22	33
7	FC Lahti	22	32
8	TPS	22	31
9	Ilves	22	25
10	SJK	22	19
11	FF Jaro	22	15
12	IFK Mariehamn	22	14

Source: Flashscore

Pos	Team	Pld	Pts
1	Inter Turku (C)	32	61
2	HJK	32	59
3	KuPS	32	53
4	AC Oulu	32	48
5	IF Gnistan	32	46
6	VPS	32	40

Source: Flashscore
(C) Champions

Pos	Team	Pld	Pts
1	FC Lahti	27	39
2	Ilves	27	38
3	TPS	27	32
4	SJK	27	27
5	FF Jaro (O)	27	21
6	IFK Mariehamn (R)	27	19

Source: Flashscore
(O) Play-off winners; (R) Relegated

=== France ===
- Country: France
- Football association: French Football Federation
- Top-level league: Ligue 1 (French: Ligue 1/Le Championnat)
- UEFA ranking: 5th
- "Ligue 1 - France". Soccerway. Archived from the original on 7 February 2013.

France's first football team—Le Havre AC—formed in 1872. The first French championship was first held in 1894, but only featured teams from the capital, Paris. Between 1896 and 1912, national championships were organised by several competing federations; the first universally recognised national championship took place in the 1912–13 season. However, it only lasted two seasons; from the outbreak of the First World War in 1914, French football operated on a regional basis until 1932. A national league resumed between 1932 and 1939, and has operated annually since the conclusion of the Second World War in 1945. Ligue 1 and its predecessors have featured 20 teams since the 1946–47 season. Each team plays the other nineteen sides home and away, and at the end of the season the bottom three teams are relegated to Ligue 2. From 2023 to 2024 season, the Ligue 1 was reduced to 18 teams which meant 4 teams were relegated in the 2022–23 season. So far, Olympique de Marseille and PSG are the only French club# to have won the UEFA Champions League, in 1993 for Marseille and 2025 and 2026 for PSG.

Clubs and locations as of 2025–26 season:

Location of teams in 2025–26 Ligue 1

Pos	Team	Pld	Pts
1	Paris Saint-Germain (C)	34	76
2	Lens	34	70
3	Lille	34	61
4	Lyon	34	60
5	Marseille	34	59
6	Rennes	34	59
7	Monaco	34	54
8	Strasbourg	34	53
9	Toulouse	34	45
10	Lorient	34	45
11	Paris FC	34	44
12	Brest	34	39
13	Angers	34	36
14	Le Havre	34	35
15	Auxerre	34	34
16	Nice (O)	34	32
17	Nantes (R)	34	24
18	Metz (R)	34	17

Source: Ligue 1
(C) Champions; (O) Play-off winners; (R) Relegated

=== Georgia ===
- Country: Georgia
- Football association: Georgian Football Federation
- Top-level league: Georgian Premier League (Georgian: ეროვნული ლიგა; Erovnuli Liga, literally "National League")
- UEFA ranking: 53rd
- "Umaglesi Liga - Georgia". Soccerway. Archived from the original on 7 February 2013.

A Georgian football championship first took place in 1926, as part of the Soviet football system. The first independent championship took place in 1990, despite the fact that Georgia remained a Soviet state until 1991. Upon independence, Georgia subsequently joined UEFA and FIFA in 1992.

When Georgia organised its first independent championship, it operated with a spring-to-autumn season contained entirely within a calendar year. After the 1991 championship, the country transitioned to an autumn-to-spring season spanning two calendar years. This format continued through the 2015–16 season, after which it returned to a spring-to-autumn format. This was accomplished by holding an abbreviated 2016 season in autumn; the transition was completed for the 2017 season. Before the most recent transition, 16 teams had competed in the top flight, but the league was reduced to 14 teams for the 2016 season, and was reduced further to 10 for 2017 and beyond.

Clubs and locations as of 2025 season:

Locations of the 2025 Erovnuli Liga teams.

Pos	Team	Pld	Pts
1	Iberia 1999 (C)	36	80
2	Dila Gori	36	78
3	Torpedo Kutaisi	36	63
4	Dinamo Tbilisi	36	57
5	Gagra	36	43
6	Dinamo Batumi	36	43
7	Samgurali Tskaltubo	36	42
8	Telavi (R)	36	36
9	Gareji (R)	36	34
10	Kolkheti-1913 (R)	36	22

Source: Erovnuli Liga, Soccerway
(C) Champions; (R) Relegated

=== Germany ===
- Country: Germany
- Football association: German Football Association
- Top-level league: Bundesliga (German: Fußball-Bundesliga)
- UEFA ranking: 4th
- "Bundesliga - Germany". Soccerway. Archived from the original on 7 February 2013.

The Bundesliga consists of 18 teams, who play each other twice, for a total of 34 matches. The teams finishing in 17th and 18th places are relegated directly to the 2. Bundesliga, while the team finishing in 16th place enters into a two-legged play-off with the team finishing 3rd in the lower division.

Clubs and locations as of 2025–26 season:

Locations of the 2025–26 Bundesliga teams

Pos	Team	Pld	Pts
1	Bayern Munich (C)	34	89
2	Borussia Dortmund	34	73
3	RB Leipzig	34	65
4	VfB Stuttgart	34	62
5	TSG Hoffenheim	34	61
6	Bayer Leverkusen	34	59
7	SC Freiburg	34	47
8	Eintracht Frankfurt	34	44
9	FC Augsburg	34	43
10	Mainz 05	34	40
11	Union Berlin	34	39
12	Borussia Mönchengladbach	34	38
13	Hamburger SV	34	38
14	1. FC Köln	34	32
15	Werder Bremen	34	32
16	VfL Wolfsburg (R)	34	29
17	1. FC Heidenheim (R)	34	26
18	FC St. Pauli (R)	34	26

Source: Bundesliga
(C) Champions; (R) Relegated

=== Gibraltar ===
- Country: Gibraltar
- Football association: Gibraltar Football Association
- Top-level league: Gibraltar Premier Division
- UEFA ranking: 48th
- "Premier Division - Gibraltar". Soccerway. Archived from the original on 7 July 2015.

The Gibraltar Football Association was founded in 1895, making it one of the ten oldest active football associations in the world. League football has been organized by the GFA since 1905. The first league season after Gibraltar were accepted as full members of UEFA was 2013–14, making qualification to the UEFA Champions League and UEFA Europa League possible since the 2014–15 season, provided the relevant club has received a UEFA licence. The Premier Division has consisted of 10 teams since the 2015–16 season. Due to the continued reconstruction of Victoria Stadium, games will continue to be played at the Europa Sports Park during the 2025–26 season.

Clubs as of 2025–26 season:

Location of the stadia where all teams play in the 2025–26 Gibraltar Football League

Pos	Team	Pld	Pts
1	Lincoln Red Imps	22	59
2	St Joseph's	22	58
3	Mons Calpe	22	46
4	Europa	22	46
5	Lions Gibraltar	22	38
6	Lynx	22	34
7	FC Magpies	22	26
8	Europa Point	22	22
9	College 1975	22	14
10	Glacis United	22	12
11	Hound Dogs	22	8
12	Manchester 62 (E)	22	7

Source: Soccerway
(E) Folded after failing to obtain license for next season

Pos	Team	Pld	Pts	LIN	SJO	EFC	MON	LGI	LYN
1	Lincoln Red Imps (C)	27	72		1–0	2–0	2–1		4–1
2	St Joseph's	27	63					3–3	1–0
3	Europa	27	56		0–0		4–1		3–1
4	Mons Calpe	27	55		3–2			3–1	
5	Lions Gibraltar	27	43	1–1		0–3			
6	Lynx	27	34				2–3	0–1	

Source: Soccerway
Legend: Blue = home team win; Yellow = draw; Red = away team win.
(C) Champions

=== Greece ===
- Country: Greece
- Football association: Hellenic Football Federation
- Top-level league: Super League Greece (Greek: Σούπερ Λίγκα Ελλάδα)
- UEFA ranking: 11th
- "Super League - Greece". Soccerway. Archived from the original on 7 February 2013.

Clubs and locations as of 2025–26 season:

Locations of the 2025–26 Super League Greece teams

Pos	Team	Pld	Pts
1	AEK Athens	26	60
2	Olympiacos	26	58
3	PAOK	26	57
4	Panathinaikos	26	49
5	Levadiakos	26	42
6	OFI	26	32
7	Volos	26	31
8	Aris	26	30
9	Atromitos	26	29
10	A.E. Kifisia	26	27
11	Panetolikos	26	26
12	AEL	26	23
13	Panserraikos	26	17
14	Asteras Tripolis	26	17

Source: Super League Greece

=== Hungary ===
- Country: Hungary
- Football association: Hungarian Football Federation
- Top-level league: Hungarian National Championship (Hungarian: Nemzeti Bajnokság I)
- UEFA ranking: 22nd
- "NB I - Hungary". Soccerway. Archived from the original on 8 February 2013.

Clubs and locations as of 2025–26 season:

Location of teams in 2025–26 Nemzeti Bajnokság I
Location of Budapest teams

Pos	Team	Pld	Pts
1	Győr (C)	33	69
2	Ferencváros	33	68
3	Paks	33	53
4	Debrecen	33	53
5	Zalaegerszeg	33	48
6	Puskás Akadémia	33	46
7	Újpest	33	40
8	Kisvárda	33	40
9	Nyíregyháza	33	40
10	MTK	33	38
11	Diósgyőr (R)	33	28
12	Kazincbarcika (R)	33	22

Source: Hungarian Football Federation (in Hungarian)
(C) Champions; (R) Relegated

=== Iceland ===
- Country: Iceland
- Football association: Football Association of Iceland (Icelandic: Knattspyrnusamband Íslands)
- Top-level league: Icelandic Best Division (Icelandic: Besta deild karla)
- UEFA ranking: 32nd
- "Úrvalsdeild - Iceland". Soccerway. Archived from the original on 7 February 2013.

Clubs and locations as of 2026 season:

Locations of the 2026 Besta deild karla teams

Pos	Team	Pld	Pts
1	Víkingur Reykjavík	22	53
2	Fram	22	45
3	KR	22	44
4	Breiðablik	22	30
5	ÍA	22	30
6	Keflavík	22	28
7	Stjarnan	22	28
8	Valur	22	27
9	FH	22	21
10	Þór Akureyri	22	21
11	KA	22	20
12	ÍBV	22	18

Source: KSI (in Icelandic), Soccerway

Pos	Team	Pld	Pts
1	Víkingur Reykjavík (C)	27	64
2	KR	27	56
3	Fram	27	47
4	ÍA	27	38
5	Breiðablik	27	36
6	Keflavík	27	30

Source: KSI (in Icelandic), Soccerway
(C) Champions

Pos	Team	Pld	Pts
1	Stjarnan	27	34
2	Valur	27	34
3	FH	27	30
4	Þór Akureyri	27	30
5	KA (R)	27	29
6	ÍBV (R)	27	22

Source: KSI (in Icelandic), Soccerway
(R) Relegated

=== Israel ===
- Country: Israel
- Football association: Israel Football Association
- Top-level league: Israeli Premier League (Hebrew: ליגת העל; Ligat HaAl, literally "Super League")
- UEFA ranking: 20th
- "Ligat ha'Al - Israel". Soccerway. Archived from the original on 6 February 2013.

Clubs and locations as of 2025–26 season:

Locations of the 2025–26 Israeli Premier League teams

Pos	Team	Pld	Pts
1	Hapoel Be'er Sheva	26	59
2	Beitar Jerusalem	26	57
3	Maccabi Tel Aviv	26	49
4	Hapoel Tel Aviv	26	49
5	Maccabi Haifa	26	42
6	Hapoel Petah Tikva	26	37
7	Maccabi Netanya	26	35
8	Bnei Sakhnin	26	32
9	Ironi Kiryat Shmona	26	27
10	Hapoel Haifa	26	25
11	F.C. Ashdod	26	24
12	Hapoel Jerusalem	26	21
13	Ironi Tiberias	26	19
14	Maccabi Bnei Reineh	26	12

Source: Soccerway

=== Italy ===
- Country: Italy
- Football association: Federazione Italiana Giuoco Calcio
- Top-level league: Serie A (Series A)
- UEFA ranking: 2nd
- "Serie A - Italy". Soccerway. Archived from the original on 7 February 2013.

Clubs and locations as of 2025–26 season:

Locations of the 2025–26 Serie A teams

Pos	Team	Pld	Pts
1	Inter Milan (C)	38	87
2	Napoli	38	76
3	Roma	38	73
4	Como	38	71
5	AC Milan	38	70
6	Juventus	38	69
7	Atalanta	38	59
8	Bologna	38	56
9	Lazio	38	54
10	Udinese	38	50
11	Sassuolo	38	49
12	Torino	38	45
13	Parma	38	45
14	Cagliari	38	43
15	Fiorentina	38	42
16	Genoa	38	41
17	Lecce	38	38
18	Cremonese (R)	38	34
19	Hellas Verona (R)	38	21
20	Pisa (R)	38	18

Source: Serie A
(C) Champions; (R) Relegated

=== Kazakhstan ===
- Country: Kazakhstan
- Football association: Football Union of Kazakhstan
- Top-level league: Kazakhstan Premier League (Kazakh: Қазақстан Кәсіпқой Футбол Лигасы, literally "Kazakhstan Professional Football League")
- UEFA ranking: 37th
- "Premier League - Kazakhstan". Soccerway. Archived from the original on 7 February 2013.

Clubs and locations as of 2026 season:

Locations of teams in the 2026 Kazakhstan Premier League

Pos	Team	Pld	Pts
1	Ordabasy (C)	30	68
2	Kairat	30	65
3	Astana	30	54
4	Okzhetpes	30	54
5	Aktobe	30	49
6	Elimai	30	45
7	Tobol	30	41
8	Jenis	30	36
9	Ulytau	30	35
10	Kyzylzhar	30	33
11	Kaspiy	30	33
12	Irtysh	30	32
13	Atyrau	30	30
14	Altai	30	28
15	Zhetysu (R)	30	27
16	Kaisar (R)	30	25

Source: UEFA, Soccerway
(C) Champions; (R) Relegated

=== Kosovo ===
- Country: Kosovo
- Football association: Football Federation of Kosovo
- Top-level league: Football Superleague of Kosovo (Albanian: Superliga e Futbollit të Kosovës)
- UEFA ranking: 36th
- "Superliga - Kosovo". Soccerway. Archived from the original on 30 April 2021.

Clubs and locations as of 2025–26 season:

Locations of the 2025–26 Football Superleague of Kosovo teams

Pos	Team	Pld	Pts
1	Drita (C)	36	66
2	Malisheva	36	59
3	Ballkani	36	58
4	Dukagjini	36	51
5	Gjilani	36	51
6	Drenica	36	50
7	Prishtina	36	49
8	Llapi (O)	36	49
9	Ferizaj (R)	36	36
10	Prishtina e Re (R)	36	31

Source: Official website
(C) Champions; (O) Play-off winners; (R) Relegated

=== Latvia ===
- Country: Latvia
- Football association: Latvian Football Federation
- Top-level league: Latvian Higher League (Latvian: Virslīga)
- UEFA ranking: 39th
- "Virsliga - Latvia". Soccerway. Archived from the original on 7 February 2013.

Clubs and locations as of 2026 season:

Locations of the 2026 Latvian Higher League teams

Pos	Team	Pld	Pts
1	RFS (C, Q)	35	89
2	Riga (T)	35	83
3	Auda (T)	36	73
4	Daugavpils (Q)	36	52
5	Liepāja	36	51
6	Super Nova	36	40
7	Jelgava	36	35
8	Grobiņa	36	29
9	Tukums 2000 (Q)	36	25
10	Ogre United (R)	36	19

Updated to match(es) played on 8 November 2026. Source: LFF
(C) Champions; (Q) Qualified for the phase indicated; (R) Relegated; (T) Qualified, but not yet for the particular phase indicated

=== Lithuania ===
- Country: Lithuania
- Football association: Lithuanian Football Federation
- Top-level league: TOPLYGA
- UEFA ranking: 46th
- "A Lyga - Lithuania". Soccerway. Archived from the original on 7 February 2013.

Clubs as of 2026 season:

Home towns of the 2026 TOPLYGA teams

Pos	Team	Pld	Pts
1	Kauno Žalgiris (C)	32	58
2	Sūduva	32	56
3	Žalgiris	32	54
4	Transinvest	32	52
5	Banga	32	42
6	Džiugas	32	42
7	Panevėžys	32	38
8	Hegelmann	32	26
9	Šiauliai (Q)	32	24
10	Riteriai (D, R)	0	0

Source: TOPLYGA, Soccerway
(C) Champions; (D) Disqualified; (Q) Qualified for the phase indicated; (R) Relegated

=== Luxembourg ===
- Country: Luxembourg
- Football association: Luxembourg Football Federation
- Top-level league: Luxembourg National Division (Luxembourgish: Nationaldivisioun French: Division Nationale)
- UEFA ranking: 51st
- "National Division - Luxembourg". Soccerway. Archived from the original on 7 February 2013.

Clubs and locations as of 2025–26 season:

Locations of the 2025–26 Luxembourg National Division teams
Locations of the 2025–26 Luxembourg National Division teams (Esch Canton)

Pos	Team	Pld	Pts
1	Atert Bissen (C)	30	65
2	Differdange 03	30	65
3	Mondorf-les-Bains	30	60
4	UNA Strassen	30	58
5	F91 Dudelange	30	58
6	Jeunesse Esch	30	40
7	Racing Union	30	40
8	Käerjeng 97	30	38
9	Hostert	30	36
10	Victoria Rosport	30	35
11	Progrès Niederkorn	30	34
12	Swift Hesperange	30	32
13	Jeunesse Canach (R)	30	31
14	Mamer 32 (R)	30	29
15	Union Titus Pétange (R)	30	25
16	Rodange (R)	30	25

Source: UEFA, Flashscore
(C) Champions; (R) Relegated

=== Malta ===
- Country: Malta
- Football association: Malta Football Association
- Top-level league: Maltese Premier League (Maltese: Il-Premjer)
- UEFA ranking: 41st
- "Premier League - Malta". Soccerway. Archived from the original on 4 February 2013.

Clubs as of 2025–26 season:

Location of teams in 2025–26 Maltese Premier League

Pos	Team	Pld	Pts
1	Floriana (C)	32	70
2	Ħamrun Spartans	32	62
3	Marsaxlokk	32	56
4	Valletta	32	53
5	Sliema Wanderers	32	48
6	Gżira United	32	43
7	Hibernians	32	39
8	Birkirkara	32	35
9	Naxxar Lions (R)	32	35
10	Żabbar St. Patrick (O)	32	31
11	Mosta (O)	32	26
12	Tarxien Rainbows (R)	32	22

Source: Malta Football Association
(C) Champions; (O) Play-off relegation winner; (R) Relegated

=== Moldova ===
- Country: Republic of Moldova
- Football association: Football Association of Moldova
- Top-level league: Moldovan Super Liga
- UEFA ranking: 33rd
- "Divizia Națională - Moldova". Soccerway. Archived from the original on 7 February 2013.

Clubs and locations as of 2025–26 season:

Locations of the 2025–26 teams

Pos	Team	Pld	Pts
1	Petrocub Hîncești	21	48
2	Zimbru Chișinău	21	44
3	Sheriff Tiraspol	21	41
4	Milsami Orhei	21	37
5	Bălți	21	29
6	Dacia Buiucani	21	15
7	Politehnica UTM	21	13
8	Spartanii Sportul	21	11

Source: FMF, UEFA, Soccerway

Pos	Team	Pld	Pts
1	Petrocub Hîncești (C)	10	40
2	Sheriff Tiraspol	10	34
3	Zimbru Chișinău	10	32
4	Milsami Orhei	10	19
5	Bălți	10	16
6	Dacia Buiucani	10	2

Source: FMF, UEFA, Soccerway
(C) Champions

=== Montenegro ===
- Country: Montenegro
- Football association: Football Association of Montenegro
- Top-level league: Montenegrin First League (Montenegrin: Prva crnogorska fudbalska liga)
- UEFA ranking: 52nd
- "First League - Montenegro". Soccerway. Archived from the original on 6 February 2013.

Clubs and locations as of 2025–26 season:

2025–26 clubs

Pos	Team	Pld	Pts
1	Sutjeska (C)	36	72
2	Mornar	36	69
3	Petrovac	36	51
4	Dečić	36	51
5	Budućnost	36	48
6	Mladost Donja Gorica	36	46
7	Arsenal Tivat	36	46
8	Jezero (O)	36	41
9	Bokelj (O)	36	36
10	Jedinstvo (R)	36	35

Source: Football Association of Montenegro (in Montenegrin)
(C) Champions; (O) Play-off winners; (R) Relegated

=== Netherlands ===
- Country: Netherlands
- Football association: Royal Dutch Football Association
- Top-level league: Eredivisie (transl. Honour Division)
- UEFA ranking: 7th
- "Eredivisie - Netherlands". Soccerway. Archived from the original on 7 February 2013.

Clubs as of 2025–26 season:

Locations of the 2025–26 Eredivisie teams

Pos	Team	Pld	Pts
1	PSV Eindhoven (C)	34	84
2	Feyenoord	34	65
3	NEC	34	59
4	Twente	34	58
5	Ajax (O)	34	56
6	Utrecht	34	53
7	AZ	34	52
8	Heerenveen	34	51
9	Groningen	34	48
10	Sparta Rotterdam	34	43
11	Fortuna Sittard	34	39
12	Go Ahead Eagles	34	38
13	Excelsior	34	38
14	Telstar	34	37
15	PEC Zwolle	34	37
16	Volendam (R)	34	32
17	NAC Breda (R)	34	29
18	Heracles Almelo (R)	34	19

Source: Eredivisie
(C) Champions; (O) Play-off winners; (R) Relegated

=== North Macedonia ===
- Country: North Macedonia
- Football association: Football Federation of Macedonia
- Top-level league: Macedonian First Football League (Macedonian: Прва македонска Фудбалска Лига)
- UEFA ranking: 45th
- "First League - Macedonia FYR". Soccerway. Archived from the original on 7 February 2013.

Clubs as of 2025–26 season:

Location of teams in 2025–26 Macedonian First League

Pos	Team	Pld	Pts
1	Vardar (C)	33	83
2	Shkëndija	33	74
3	Struga	33	62
4	Sileks	33	53
5	Tikvesh	33	48
6	Arsimi	33	46
7	Bashkimi	33	42
8	Pelister (R)	33	40
9	Brera (R)	33	40
10	Makedonija G.P. (R)	33	34
11	Rabotnički (R)	33	33
12	Shkupi (R)	33	1

Source: FFM.mk, MacedonianFootball.com
(C) Champions; (R) Relegated

=== Northern Ireland ===
- Country: Northern Ireland
- Football association: Irish Football Association
- Top-level league: NIFL Premiership
- UEFA ranking: 47th
- "Premiership - Northern Ireland". Soccerway. Archived from the original on 7 February 2013.

Clubs and locations as of 2025–26 season:

Locations of the 2025–26 NIFL Irish Premiership teams
Locations of the Belfast-based 2025–26 NIFL Irish Premiership teams

Pos	Team	Pld	Pts
1	Larne	33	73
2	Glentoran	33	69
3	Coleraine	33	65
4	Linfield	33	62
5	Cliftonville	33	47
6	Dungannon Swifts	33	46
7	Carrick Rangers	33	43
8	Bangor	33	36
9	Portadown	33	36
10	Ballymena United	33	34
11	Crusaders	33	26
12	Glenavon	33	25

Source: Northern Ireland Football League

Pos	Team	Pld	Pts
1	Larne (C)	38	83
2	Coleraine	38	80
3	Glentoran	38	77
4	Linfield (O)	38	66
5	Cliftonville	38	53
6	Dungannon Swifts	38	46

Source: Northern Ireland Football League
(C) Champions; (O) Play-off winners

Pos	Team	Pld	Pts
7	Carrick Rangers	38	53
8	Portadown	38	44
9	Ballymena United	38	39
10	Bangor	38	39
11	Crusaders (O)	38	36
12	Glenavon (R)	38	28

Source: Northern Ireland Football League
(O) Play-off winners; (R) Relegated

=== Norway ===
- Country: Norway
- Football association: Football Association of Norway (NFF)
- Top-level league: Eliteserien
- UEFA ranking: 14th
- "Eliteserien - Norway". Soccerway. Archived from the original on 7 February 2013.

Clubs and locations as of 2026 season:

Locations of the teams in 2026 Eliteserien

Pos	Team	Pld	Pts
1	Viking (T)	26	62
2	Bodø/Glimt (T)	26	62
3	Rosenborg	26	46
4	Lillestrøm	26	45
5	Molde	26	44
6	Tromsø	26	40
7	Brann	26	33
8	Vålerenga	26	32
9	Sarpsborg	26	31
10	KFUM	26	31
11	HamKam	26	30
12	Fredrikstad	26	30
13	Sandefjord	26	28
14	Kristiansund	26	26
15	Aalesund	26	24
16	Start	26	19

Updated to match(es) played on 9 November 2026. Source: Football Association of Norway (in Norwegian)
(T) Qualified, but not yet for the particular phase indicated

=== Poland ===
- Country: Poland
- Football association: Polish Football Association
- Top-level league: Ekstraklasa
- UEFA ranking: 12th
- "Ekstraklasa - Poland". Soccerway. Archived from the original on 7 February 2013.

Clubs and locations as of 2025–26 season:

Location of teams in 2025–26 Ekstraklasa.

Pos	Team	Pld	Pts
1	Lech Poznań (C)	34	60
2	Górnik Zabrze	34	56
3	Jagiellonia Białystok	34	56
4	Raków Częstochowa	34	55
5	GKS Katowice	34	50
6	Legia Warsaw	34	49
7	Zagłębie Lubin	34	48
8	Wisła Płock	34	46
9	Pogoń Szczecin	34	45
10	Radomiak Radom	34	44
11	Korona Kielce	34	43
12	Motor Lublin	34	43
13	Cracovia	34	42
14	Widzew Łódź	34	42
15	Piast Gliwice	34	41
16	Lechia Gdańsk (R)	34	38
17	Arka Gdynia (R)	34	36
18	Bruk-Bet Termalica Nieciecza (R)	34	34

Source: ekstraklasa.org 90minut.pl
(C) Champions; (R) Relegated

=== Portugal ===
- Country: Portugal
- Football association: Portuguese Football Federation
- Top-level league: Primeira Liga (English: Premier League)
- UEFA ranking: 6th
- "Primeira Liga - Portugal". Soccerway. Archived from the original on 7 February 2013.

Clubs as of 2025–26 season:

Location of teams in 2025–26 Primeira Liga (Mainland)
Location of teams in 2025–26 Primeira Liga (Madeira)
Location of teams in 2025–26 Primeira Liga (Azores)

=== Republic of Ireland ===
- Country: Ireland
- Football association: Football Association of Ireland
- Top-level league: League of Ireland Premier Division (Irish: Príomhroinn Sraith na hÉireann)
- UEFA ranking: 31st
- "Premier League - Ireland Republic". Soccerway. Archived from the original on 7 February 2013.

Clubs and locations as of 2026 season:

Locations of Premier Division teams
Locations of Dublin Premier Division teams

Pos	Team	Pld	Pts
1	Shamrock Rovers (C)	36	68
2	Bohemians	36	65
3	St Patrick's Athletic	36	60
4	Shelbourne	36	49
5	Derry City	36	48
6	Dundalk	36	45
7	Waterford	36	43
8	Galway United	36	42
9	Drogheda United (R)	36	40
10	Sligo Rovers (R)	36	25

Source: League of Ireland
(C) Champions; (R) Relegated

=== Romania ===
- Country: Romania
- Football association: Romanian Football Federation
- Top-level league: Liga I
- UEFA ranking: 23rd
- "Liga I - Romania". Soccerway. Archived from the original on 7 February 2013.

Clubs and locations as of 2025–26 season:

List of top-division football clubs in UEFA countries (Romania)
Location of Bucharest / Ilfov County teams.

Pos	Team	Pld	Pts
1	Universitatea Craiova	30	60
2	Rapid București	30	56
3	Universitatea Cluj	30	54
4	CFR Cluj	30	53
5	Dinamo București	30	52
6	Argeș Pitești	30	50
7	FCSB	30	46
8	UTA Arad	30	43
9	Botoșani	30	42
10	Oțelul Galați	30	41
11	Farul Constanța	30	37
12	Petrolul Ploiești	30	32
13	Csíkszereda Miercurea Ciuc	30	32
14	Unirea Slobozia	30	25
15	Hermannstadt	30	23
16	Metaloglobus București	30	12

Source: LPF (in Romanian)

=== Russia ===
- Country: Russia
- Football association: Football Union of Russia
- Top-level league: Russian Football Premier League (Russian: Российская футбольная премьер-лига)
- UEFA ranking: 30th
- "Premier League - Russia". Soccerway. Archived from the original on 7 February 2013.

Clubs as of 2025–26 season:

Locations of teams in the 2025–26 Russian Premier League
Locations of teams in the 2025–26 Russian Premier League in Moscow

Pos	Team	Pld	Pts
1	Zenit Saint Petersburg (C)	30	68
2	Krasnodar	30	66
3	Lokomotiv Moscow	30	53
4	Spartak Moscow	30	52
5	CSKA Moscow	30	51
6	Baltika Kaliningrad	30	46
7	Dynamo Moscow	30	45
8	Rubin Kazan	30	43
9	Akhmat Grozny	30	37
10	Rostov	30	33
11	Krylia Sovetov Samara	30	32
12	Orenburg	30	29
13	Akron Tolyatti (O)	30	27
14	Dynamo Makhachkala (O)	30	26
15	Pari Nizhny Novgorod (R)	30	23
16	Sochi (R)	30	22

Source: Premier Liga
(C) Champions; (O) Play-off winners; (R) Relegated

=== San Marino ===
- Country: San Marino
- Football association: San Marino Football Federation
- League: Sammarinese Football Championship (Italian: Campionato Sammarinese di Calcio)
- UEFA ranking: 55th
- "Campionato - San Marino". Soccerway. Archived from the original on 7 February 2013.

This is a complete list of football clubs in San Marino (as San Marino has only one level domestic amateur league), apart from San Marino Calcio, the only professional Sammarinese club, which as of 2024–25 competes in Serie D, the fourth level of the Italian football league system.

Clubs and locations as of 2025–26 season:

Locations of the 2025–26 Campionato Sammarinese di Calcio teams

Pos	Team	Pld	Pts
1	Tre Fiori (C)	30	73
2	Virtus (O)	30	72
3	Tre Penne	30	70
4	La Fiorita	30	57
5	Folgore	30	57
6	Domagnano	30	49
7	Fiorentino	30	46
8	Cosmos	30	42
9	Juvenes/Dogana	30	37
10	Libertas	30	35
11	Pennarossa	30	32
12	San Giovanni	30	31
13	Faetano	30	22
14	San Marino Academy U22	30	16
15	Cailungo	30	11
16	Murata	30	−2

Source: Flashscore
(C) Champions; (O) Play-off winners

=== Scotland ===
- Country: Scotland
- Football association: Scottish Football Association
- Top-level league: Scottish Premiership
- UEFA ranking: 18th
- "Premier League - Scotland". Soccerway. Archived from the original on 7 February 2013.

Clubs and locations as of 2026–27 season:

Location of teams in the 2026–27 Scottish Premiership
Premiership football clubs in Dundee
Premiership football clubs in Edinburgh
Premiership football clubs in Glasgow

Pos	Team	Pld	Pts
1	Celtic	13	31
2	Rangers	12	27
3	Falkirk	13	21
4	Heart of Midlothian	12	20
5	Dundee	12	17
6	Dundee United	12	17
7	St Johnstone	13	17
8	St Mirren	13	14
9	Motherwell	13	13
10	Hibernian	12	11
11	Aberdeen	12	11
12	Kilmarnock	13	9

Updated to match(es) played on 8 November 2026. Source:

=== Serbia ===
- Country: Serbia
- Football association: Football Association of Serbia
- Top-level league: Serbian SuperLiga (Serbian: Суперлига Србије)
- UEFA ranking: 24th
- "Super Liga - Serbia". Soccerway. Archived from the original on 7 February 2013.

Clubs as of 2025–26 season:

Locations of the 2025–26 Serbian SuperLiga teams
Locations of the 2025–26 Serbian SuperLiga teams on the territory of Belgrade

Pos	Team	Pld	Pts
1	Red Star Belgrade	30	75
2	Vojvodina	30	62
3	Partizan	30	61
4	Železničar	30	51
5	Novi Pazar	30	47
6	OFK Beograd	30	40
7	Čukarički	30	40
8	Radnik	30	39
9	IMT	30	37
10	Radnički 1923	30	36
11	Javor-Matis	30	34
12	TSC	30	34
13	Radnički Niš	30	33
14	Mladost	30	32
15	Spartak Subotica	30	21
16	Napredak	30	14

Source: Superliga

=== Slovakia ===
- Country: Slovakia
- Football association: Slovak Football Association
- Top-level league: Slovak Super Liga (Slovak: Fortuna Liga)
- UEFA ranking: 28th
- "Super Liga - Slovakia". Soccerway. Archived from the original on 7 February 2013.

Clubs and locations as of 2025–26 season:

Location of teams in Fortuna liga 2025–26

Pos	Team	Pld	Pts
1	Slovan Bratislava	22	46
2	DAC Dunajská Streda	22	43
3	Žilina	22	40
4	Spartak Trnava	22	37
5	Podbrezová	22	36
6	Zemplín Michalovce	22	29
7	Ružomberok	22	25
8	Trenčín	22	24
9	Košice	22	24
10	Komárno	22	22
11	Tatran Prešov	22	21
12	Skalica	22	16

Source: Niké liga (in Slovak)

Pos	Team	Pld	Pts	SLO	DAC	TRN	ŽIL	ZMI	POD
1	Slovan Bratislava (C)	32	68	—	1–0	2–2	0–1	0–2	2–0
2	DAC Dunajská Streda	32	58	0–3	—	3–0	3–1	3–0	2–1
3	Spartak Trnava	32	56	0–1	2–1	—	1–0	3–0	4–1
4	Žilina	32	52	0–1	3–1	0–1	—	3–2	0–2
5	Zemplín Michalovce	32	44	1–3	2–1	1–0	2–1	—	1–2
6	Podbrezová	32	42	1–2	1–2	0–3	1–5	0–1	—

Source: Niké liga (in Slovak)
Legend: Blue = home team win; Yellow = draw; Red = away team win.
(C) Champions

Pos	Team	Pld	Pts	KOŠ	TRE	SKA	RUŽ	KOM	TAT
7	Košice	32	43	—	2–0	2–0	3–1	2–1	2–1
8	Trenčín	32	42	3–0	—	2–1	3–1	1–2	1–0
9	Skalica	32	35	3–1	4–1	—	1–0	2–1	1–0
10	Ružomberok	32	35	1–1	4–3	0–0	—	2–1	1–1
11	Komárno (O)	32	32	1–2	0–1	0–2	3–0	—	1–0
12	Tatran Prešov (R)	32	30	2–1	0–1	3–0	0–0	0–0	—

Source: Niké liga (in Slovak)
Legend: Blue = home team win; Yellow = draw; Red = away team win.
(O) Play-off winners; (R) Relegated

=== Slovenia ===
- Country: Slovenia
- Football association: Football Association of Slovenia
- Top-level league: Slovenian PrvaLiga (Slovene: Prva Slovenska nogometna liga, literally "First Slovenian Football League")
- UEFA ranking: 27th
- "1. SNL - Slovenia". Soccerway. Archived from the original on 7 February 2013.

Clubs and locations as of 2025–26 season:

Pos	Team	Pld	Pts
1	Celje (C)	34	74
2	Koper	34	67
3	Bravo	34	62
4	Olimpija Ljubljana	34	55
5	Maribor	34	53
6	Radomlje	34	45
7	Aluminij	34	36
8	Mura	34	31
9	Primorje (R)	34	22
10	Domžale (D, R)	18	12

Source: PrvaLiga
(C) Champions; (D) Disqualified; (R) Relegated

=== Spain ===
- Country: Spain
- Football association: Royal Spanish Football Federation
- Top-level league: La Liga
- UEFA ranking: 3rd
- "Primera División - Spain". Soccerway. Archived from the original on 7 February 2013.

Clubs and locations as of 2025–26 season:

Location of teams in 2025–26 La Liga
Location of Community of Madrid teams in 2025–26 La Liga

Pos	Team	Pld	W	D	L	GF	GA	GD	Pts	Qualification or relegation
1	Barcelona (C)	38	31	1	6	95	36	+59	94	Qualification for the Champions League league phase (Note: La Liga gained an additional Champions League place as a result of Spain gaining one of the two European Performance Spots (EPS) awarded to the two associations with the highest UEFA coefficient points in 2025–26.)
2	Real Madrid	38	27	5	6	77	35	+42	86	Qualification for the Champions League league phase
3	Villarreal	38	22	6	10	72	46	+26	72	Qualification for the Champions League league phase
4	Atlético Madrid	38	21	6	11	62	44	+18	69	Qualification for the Champions League league phase
5	Real Betis	38	15	15	8	59	48	+11	60	Qualification for the Champions League league phase
6	Celta Vigo	38	14	12	12	53	48	+5	54	Qualification for the Europa League league phase
7	Getafe	38	15	6	17	32	38	−6	51	Qualification for the Conference League play-off round
8	Rayo Vallecano	38	12	14	12	41	44	−3	50	
9	Valencia	38	13	10	15	46	55	−9	49	
10	Real Sociedad	38	11	13	14	59	61	−2	46 (Note: Tied on head-to-head points and goal difference. Real Sociedad placed ahead of Espanyol on overall goal difference.)	Qualification for the Europa League league phase (Note: Real Sociedad qualified for the Europa League league phase as the 2025–26 Copa del Rey winners.)
11	Espanyol	38	12	10	16	43	55	−12	46	
12	Athletic Bilbao	38	13	6	19	43	58	−15	45	
13	Sevilla	38	12	7	19	46	60	−14	43 (Note: Head-to-head points: Sevilla 6, Alavés 5, Elche 3.)	
14	Alavés	38	11	10	17	44	56	−12	43	
15	Elche	38	10	13	15	49	57	−8	43	
16	Levante	38	11	9	18	47	61	−14	42 (Note: Head-to-head points: Levante 7, Osasuna 5, Mallorca 3.)	
17	Osasuna	38	11	9	18	44	50	−6	42	
18	Mallorca (R)	38	11	9	18	47	57	−10	42	Relegation to Segunda División
19	Girona (R)	38	9	14	15	39	55	−16	41	Relegation to Segunda División
20	Oviedo (R)	38	6	11	21	26	60	−34	29	Relegation to Segunda División

Source: LaLiga EA Sports
Rules for classification: 1) Points; 2) Head-to-head points; 3) Head-to-head goal difference; 4) Goal difference; 5) Goals scored; 6) Fair-play points
(Note: Head-to-head record is used only after all the matches between the teams in question have been played)
(C) Champions; (R) Relegated

=== Sweden ===
- Country: Sweden
- Football association: Swedish Football Association
- Top-level league: Allsvenskan (The All-Swedish)
- UEFA ranking: 19th
- "Allsvenskan - Sweden". Soccerway. Archived from the original on 8 February 2013.

A Swedish championship was first organised in 1896, and the champions were decided by a knockout cup format until 1925, when Allsvenskan was formed. Sweden was one of the founding members of UEFA in 1954. As of the most recently completed 2024 season, Malmö FF have won the most national titles with 24, followed by IFK Göteborg with 18 and IFK Norrköping with 15. Malmö also have the most league titles, with 24 to 15 for IFK Götebörg and 13 for IFK Norrköping. Since 2008, Allsvenskan has featured 16 teams. They each play one another home and away, for a total of 30 games. The bottom two teams are relegated to the Superettan (The Super One), and the 14th-placed Allsvenskan team enters into a relegation playoff with the 3rd-placed Superettan team to decide which will play in Allsvenskan for the following season.

Clubs and locations as of 2026 season:

Location of teams in 2026 Allsvenskan

Pos	Team	Pld	Pts
1	Hammarby IF (X)	28	58
2	IK Sirius (X)	28	58
3	Djurgårdens IF	28	52
4	BK Häcken	28	49
5	IF Elfsborg	28	46
6	Västerås SK	28	45
7	Malmö FF	28	41
8	AIK	28	41
9	GAIS	28	40
10	IFK Göteborg	28	39
11	IF Brommapojkarna	28	35
12	Mjällby AIF	28	28
13	Kalmar FF	28	26
14	Degerfors IF	28	20
15	Örgryte IS	28	20
16	Halmstads BK	28	20

Updated to match(es) played on 8 November 2026. Source: svenskfotboll.se (in Swedish)
(X) Guaranteed at least UEFA Conference League

=== Switzerland ===
- Country: Switzerland
- Football association: Swiss Football Association
- Top-level league: Swiss Super League (German: Schweizer Fussballmeisterschaft)
- UEFA ranking: 16th
- "Super League - Switzerland". Soccerway. Archived from the original on 7 February 2013.

Clubs and locations as of 2025–26 season:

Location of the 2025–26 Swiss Super League teams

Pos	Team	Pld	Pts
1	Thun (C)	38	75
2	St. Gallen	38	70
3	Lugano	38	67
4	Sion	38	63
5	Basel	38	56
6	Young Boys	38	55
7	Luzern	38	53
8	Servette	38	53
9	Lausanne-Sport	38	42
10	Zürich	38	38
11	Grasshopper (O)	38	33
12	Winterthur (R)	38	23

Source: Brack Super League - Tabelle
(C) Champions; (O) Play-off winners; (R) Relegated

=== Turkey ===
- Country: Turkey
- Football association: Turkish Football Federation
- Top-level league: Süper Lig (English: Super League)
- UEFA ranking: 9th
- "Süper Lig - Turkey". Soccerway. Archived from the original on 9 February 2013.

Turkish football operated on a regional basis until the 1950s. A national knockout tournament took place in 1957 and 1958, to decide European qualification. The Turkish Football Federation retrospectively recognised these tournaments as deciding the Turkish champions; both competitions were won by Beşiktaş. A national league was formed in 1959, and has been held annually from then onwards. Since the formation of a national league, the most successful teams are Galatasaray and Fenerbahçe, with 24 and 19 league titles respectively, as of the most recently completed 2023–24 season. Currently, 19 teams compete in the Süper Lig. Each team plays the other teams home and away, with the three lowest placed teams being relegated to the TFF 1. Lig and the top two teams from the 1. Lig, together with the winner of play-offs involving the third to seventh placed 1. Lig clubs being promoted in their place for the following season.

Clubs as of 2025–26 season:

Location of teams in 2025–26 Süper Lig
Istanbul Province clubs

Pos	Team	Pld	Pts
1	Galatasaray (C)	34	77
2	Fenerbahçe	34	74
3	Trabzonspor	34	69
4	Beşiktaş	34	60
5	Başakşehir	34	57
6	Göztepe	34	55
7	Samsunspor	34	51
8	Rizespor	34	41
9	Konyaspor	34	40
10	Kocaelispor	34	37
11	Alanyaspor	34	37
12	Gaziantep	34	37
13	Kasımpaşa	34	35
14	Gençlerbirliği	34	34
15	Eyüpspor	34	33
16	Antalyaspor (R)	34	32
17	Kayserispor (R)	34	30
18	Fatih Karagümrük (R)	34	30

Source: Süper Lig
(C) Champions; (R) Relegated

=== Ukraine ===
- Country: Ukraine
- Football association: Football Federation of Ukraine
- Top-level league: Ukrainian Premier League (Ukrainian: Прем'єр-ліга)
- UEFA ranking: 25th
- "Premier League - Ukraine". Soccerway. Archived from the original on 7 February 2013.

As a member of the Soviet Union, Ukraine's league operated as a feeder to the national Soviet leagues, meaning that until 1992 the strongest Ukrainian teams did not take part. The Football Federation of Ukraine was formed shortly after the country achieved independence in 1991, and gained UEFA membership the following year. Since the formation of a national league, Dynamo Kyiv have won 16 titles, Shakhtar Donetsk 15, and Tavriya Simferopol one, as of the most recently completed 2023–24 season.

Through the 2013–14 season, 16 teams participated in the Premier League. However, during that season's winter break, the Euromaidan protests began, soon followed by Russia's annexation of the Crimean peninsula and the still-ongoing war in the country's east. These developments led to the league dropping to 14 teams in 2014–15 and 12 in 2016–17.

Beginning with the 2016–17 season, the league season is divided into two stages. In the first stage, the teams play one another home and away, after which the league splits into two groups, each playing a home-and-away schedule within the group and with table points carrying over intact. The top six teams play to determine the league champion and European qualifying spots, while the bottom six teams play to avoid relegation, with the bottom two at the end of the second stage dropping to the Ukrainian First League.

Clubs and locations as of 2025–26 season:

Home venues of teams in the 2025–26 Ukrainian Premier League.
Teams in italics are from a conflict zone of the war in Donbas and are playing their home games in different cities.

Pos	Team	Pld	Pts
1	Shakhtar Donetsk (C)	30	72
2	LNZ Cherkasy	30	60
3	Polissya Zhytomyr	30	59
4	Dynamo Kyiv	30	57
5	Metalist 1925 Kharkiv	30	51
6	Kolos Kovalivka	30	49
7	Kryvbas Kryvyi Rih	30	48
8	Zorya Luhansk	30	46
9	Karpaty Lviv	30	41
10	Epitsentr Kamianets-Podilskyi	30	32
11	Veres Rivne	30	31
12	Obolon Kyiv	30	31
13	Kudrivka (O)	30	28
14	Rukh Lviv (W, R)	30	21
15	Oleksandriya (R)	30	17
16	Poltava (R)	30	13

Updated to match(es) played on 24 May 2026. Source: upl.ua
(C) Champions; (O) Relegation play-offs winner; (R) Relegated; (W) Excluded from the competitions

Teams that placed 13th and 14th in the 2025–26 Ukrainian Premier League play a two-leg play-off with the third and fourth teams of the 2025–26 Ukrainian First League.

The withdrawn 14th-placed Rukh Lviv (Note: The participation of FC Rukh in the relegation playoffs is to be confirmed, since the owner announced that the club may not participate in that stage.) was replaced with the 15th-placed FC Oleksandriya.

This round includes 2 clubs from the Premier League: FC Oleksandriya and Kudrivka; 2 clubs from the First League: Livyi Bereh Kyiv and Ahrobiznes Volochysk.

Premier League teams	Agg.	First League teams	1st leg	2nd leg
FC Oleksandriya	1–2	Livyi Bereh Kyiv	1–1	0–1
Kudrivka	2–2 (3–2 p)	Ahrobiznes Volochysk	0–0	2–2

=== First Semi-final ===
5 June 2025
15:30

FC Oleksandriya	1–1	Livyi Bereh Kyiv
Yade 21'	Report	Voloshyn 51'

CSC Nika, Oleksandriya
Attendance: 1170
Referee: Oleksiy Derevinskyi (Khmelnytskyi)

9 June 2026
15:30

Livyi Bereh Kyiv	1–0	FC Oleksandriya
Banada 45'	Report

Arena Livyi Bereh, Kyiv
Attendance: 1285
Referee: Dmytro Panchyshyn (Kharkiv)

Livyi Bereh Kyiv won 2–1 on aggregate and promotion to Premier League.

==== Second Semi-final ====
5 June 2026
18:00

Kudrivka	0–0	Ahrobiznes Volochysk
	Report

Avanhard, Rivne
Attendance: 75
Referee: Vitaliy Romanov (Dnipro)

9 June 2026
18:00

Ahrobiznes Volochysk	2–2	Kudrivka
B. Kozak 70'; Tolochko 90+1' (p)	Report	Machelyuk 39'; Lyehostayev 81'
Penalties
Havrushko (penalty missed); B.Kozak (penalty scored); Riznyk (penalty missed); Nyzhnyk (penalty scored); Tolochko (penalty missed)	2–3	(penalty missed) Veklyak; (penalty scored) Dumanyuk; (penalty scored) Machelyuk; (penalty missed) Hlushchenko; (penalty scored) Lyehostayev

Ternopilskyi miskyi imeni Shukhevycha, Ternopil
Attendance: 2500
Referee: Oleksandr Shandor (Lviv)

2–2 on aggregate; Kudrivka won 3–2 on penalties

=== Wales ===
- Country: Wales
- Football association: Football Association of Wales
- Top-level league: Cymru Premier (Welsh: Cynghrair Cymru)
- UEFA ranking: 54th
- "Premier League - Wales". Soccerway. Archived from the original on 7 February 2013.

Although Wales joined UEFA in 1954, Welsh football operated on a regional basis until 1992, with no national championship. Five Welsh clubs play not in the Welsh football league system, but in the English football league system. Currently, there are no Welsh clubs competing in the Premier League. Welsh club Swansea City was relegated to the second level, the EFL Championship, at the end of the 2017–18 season, while Cardiff City were relegated following the 2018–19 season. Three other Welsh clubs participate lower down the English football league system:Wrexham (EFL League One), Newport County (EFL League Two), and Merthyr Town (Southern League Premier Division South). Despite competing in Football Association competitions, the latter three are under the jurisdiction of the Football Association of Wales. Until 2011 Swansea City and Cardiff City had similar arrangements with the FAW but are now under the jurisdiction of The Football Association. The most successful Welsh club since the formation of the Welsh Premier League is The New Saints, with 16 league titles. Since the 2010–11 season, the Welsh Premier League has featured 12 teams. Relegation to and promotion from lower regional leagues is in part dictated by whether or not clubs can obtain a Premier League licence; only clubs able to obtain a licence are eligible for promotion, and clubs which fail to obtain one are relegated regardless of their final league position.

Clubs and locations as of 2025–26 season:

Locations of the 2025–26 Cymru Premier teams

Pos	Team	Pld	Pts
1	The New Saints	22	53
2	Connah's Quay Nomads	22	47
3	Penybont	22	38
4	Caernarfon Town	22	34
5	Barry Town United	22	30
6	Colwyn Bay	22	30
7	Cardiff Metropolitan University	22	28
8	Briton Ferry Llansawel	22	25
9	Haverfordwest County	22	24
10	Bala Town	22	23
11	Flint Town United	22	21
12	Llanelli Town	22	8

Source: Cymru Premier

Pos	Team	Pld	Pts
1	The New Saints (C)	32	80
2	Connah's Quay Nomads	32	58
3	Barry Town United	32	46
4	Caernarfon Town	32	45
5	Colwyn Bay	32	45
6	Penybont (O)	32	41

Source: Cymru Premier
(C) Champions; (O) Play-off winners

Pos	Team	Pld	Pts
7	Haverfordwest County	32	48
8	Briton Ferry Llansawel	32	45
9	Cardiff Metropolitan University	32	38
10	Flint Town United	32	35
11	Bala Town (R)	32	32
12	Llanelli Town (R)	32	13

Source: Cymru Premier
(R) Relegated

== See also ==
- List of second division football clubs in UEFA countries
- List of top-division football clubs in AFC countries
- List of top-division football clubs in CAF countries
- List of top-division football clubs in CONCACAF countries
- List of top-division football clubs in CONMEBOL countries
- List of top-division football clubs in OFC countries
- List of top-division football clubs in non-FIFA countries
