= Carina Wenninger =

Austrian footballer (born 1991)

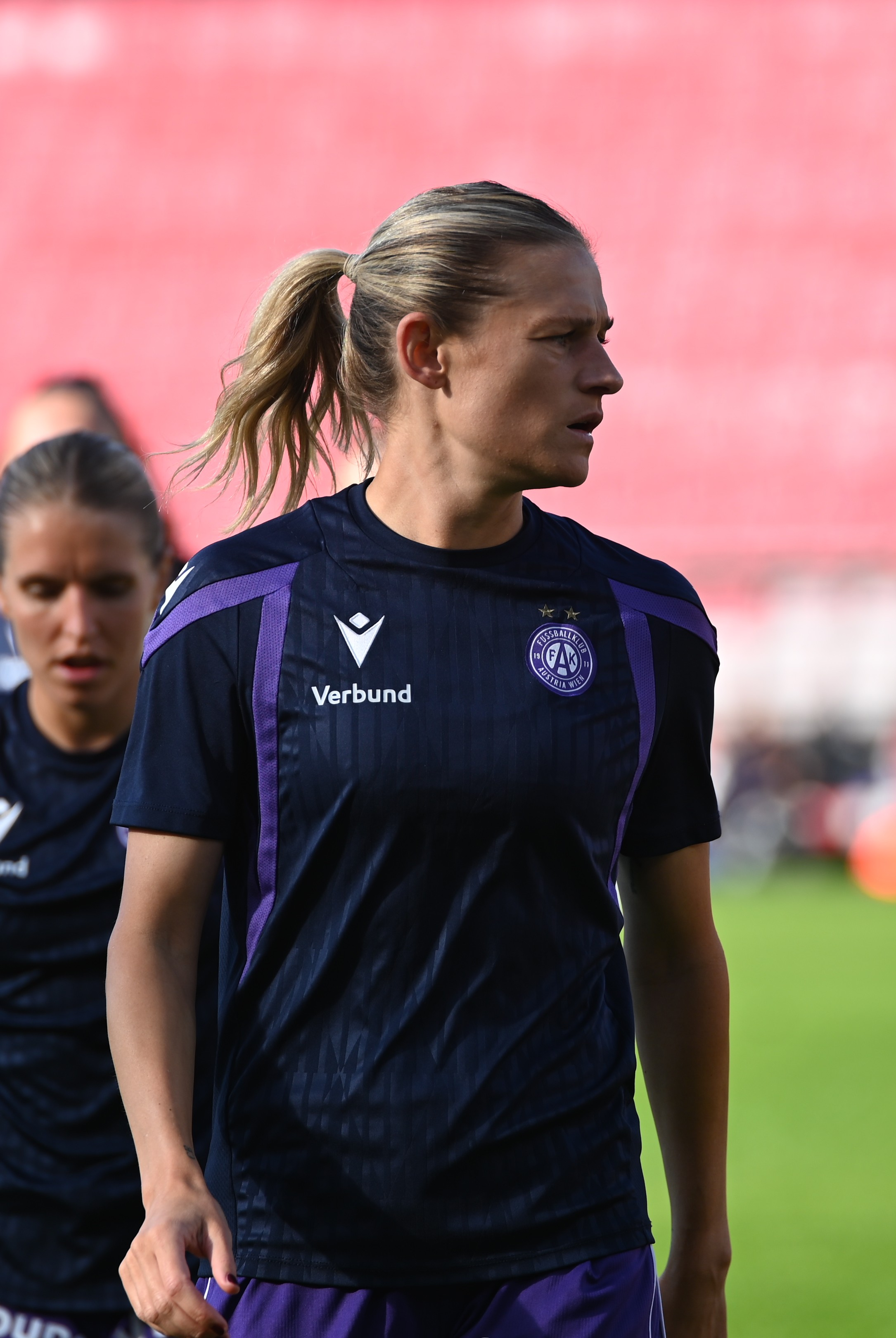
- Wenninger with Austria Wien in 2026

Personal information
- Date of birth: 6 February 1991 (age 35)
- Place of birth: Thal, Austria
- Height: 1.79 m (5 ft 10 in)
- Position: Defender

Team information
- Current team: Austria Wien
- Number: 23

Youth career
- 2000–2005: SV Thal
- 2005–2006: FC Gratkorn
- 2006–2007: LUV Graz

Senior career*
Years	Team	Apps	(Gls)
2007–2009	Bayern Munich II	30	(4)
2007–2023	Bayern Munich	222	(8)
2022–2023	→ Roma (loan)	21	(1)
2024	Rapid Wien	0	(0)
2024–	Austria Wien	57	(12)

International career
2006–2007	Austria U-19	6	(0)
2007–2023	Austria	127	(7)
- * Club domestic league appearances and goals as of 14 November 2026

Carina Wenninger (born 6 February 1991) is an Austrian professional footballer who plays as a defender for ÖFB Frauen Bundesliga club Austria Wien. She has played in 126 matches for the Austria women's national team.

== Career ==
On 22 June 2022, Wenninger joined AS Roma on loan. She retired at the end of the 2022–23 season.

Wenninger announced that she would end her career in the summer of 2023, but decided in February 2024 to extend her career with the newly founded team Rapid Wien. In July 2024, she moved to Austria Wien to play in the Austrian top league. On 30 May 2026, she scored a late stoppage-time goal in a 1–1 draw with SKN St. Pölten on the final matchday of the 2025–26 season, securing her club's first title in the Austrian league.

== International career ==
Wenninger was a member of the Austrian national team.

Wenninger was part of the 23-woman squad that represented Austria and reached the semi-finals at the UEFA Women's Euro 2017.

On 1 December 2020, she played her 100th match for Austria in a 1–0 win over Serbia in the UEFA Women's Euro 2022 qualifying.

Wenninger was part of the squad that was called up to the UEFA Women's Euro 2022.

== Career statistics ==
=== Club statistics ===
As of match played 19 November 2026

Club	Season	League			National Cup		League Cup		Continental		Other		Total	
Club	Season	Division	Apps	Goals	Apps	Goals	Apps	Goals	Apps	Goals	Apps	Goals	Apps	Goals
Bayern Munich	2008–09	Bundesliga	2	0	0	0	—		—		—		2	0
Bayern Munich	2009–10	Bundesliga	21	0	1	0	—		4 (Note: Appearances in the UEFA Women's Champions League)	0	—		26	0
Bayern Munich	2010–11	Bundesliga	18	0	4	1	6	0	—		—		28	1
Bayern Munich	2011–12	Bundesliga	20	0	5	0	—		—		—		25	0
Bayern Munich	2012–13	Bundesliga	22	2	4	1	—		—		—		26	3
Bayern Munich	2013–14	Bundesliga	9	0	2	0	—		—		—		11	0
Bayern Munich	2014–15	Bundesliga	6	0	0	0	—		—		—		6	0
Bayern Munich	2015–16	Bundesliga	13	0	3	1	—		1	0	—		17	1
Bayern Munich	2016–17	Bundesliga	19	1	3	1	—		5	0	—		27	2
Bayern Munich	2017–18	Bundesliga	20	2	5	2	—		—		—		25	4
Bayern Munich	2018–19	Bundesliga	21	1	4	0	—		7	0	—		32	1
Bayern Munich	2019–20	Bundesliga	18	1	2	0	—		3	2	—		23	3
Bayern Munich	2020–21	Bundesliga	19	1	3	0	—		8	0	—		30	1
Bayern Munich	2021–22	Bundesliga	14	0	3	1	—		5	0	—		22	1
Bayern Munich	Total		222	8	39	7	6	0	33	2	—		300	17
Roma (loan)	2022–23	Serie A	21	1	4	0	—		9	1	1 (Note: Appearances in the Italian Women's Super Cup)	0	35	2
Austria Wien	2024–25	ÖFB Bundesliga	23	3	5	0	—		—		—		28	3
Austria Wien	2025-26	ÖFB Bundesliga	23	5	5	0			10	1 (Note: Four appearances and a goal in UEFA Women's Champions League qualifying rounds and six appearances in UEFA Women's Europa Cup)			38	6
Austria Wien	2026-27	ÖFB Bundesliga	11	4	0	0			9	1			20	5
Austria Wien	Total		57	12	10	0	0	0	19	2	0	0	86	14
Career Total			300	21	53	7	6	0	61	5	1	0	421	33

=== International goals ===
No.	Date	Venue	Opponent	Score	Result	Competition
1.	8 April 2022	Stadion Wiener Neustadt, Wiener Neustadt, Austria	Northern Ireland	1–0	3–1	2023 FIFA Women's World Cup qualification

== Honours ==
Bayern München

- Frauen-Bundesliga: 2014–15, 2015–16, 2020–21
- DFB-Pokal: 2012
- Bundesliga Cup: 2011

Roma

- Serie A: 2022–23
- Supercoppa Italiana: 2022

Austria Wien

- ÖFB Frauen Bundesliga: 2025–26
- ÖFB Frauen Cup: 2025–26

Austria

- Cyprus Cup: 2016

Individual

- Serie A Women's Team of the Year: 2022–23

== See also ==
- List of women's footballers with 100 or more international caps
