= Chiara D'Angelo =

Austrian footballer

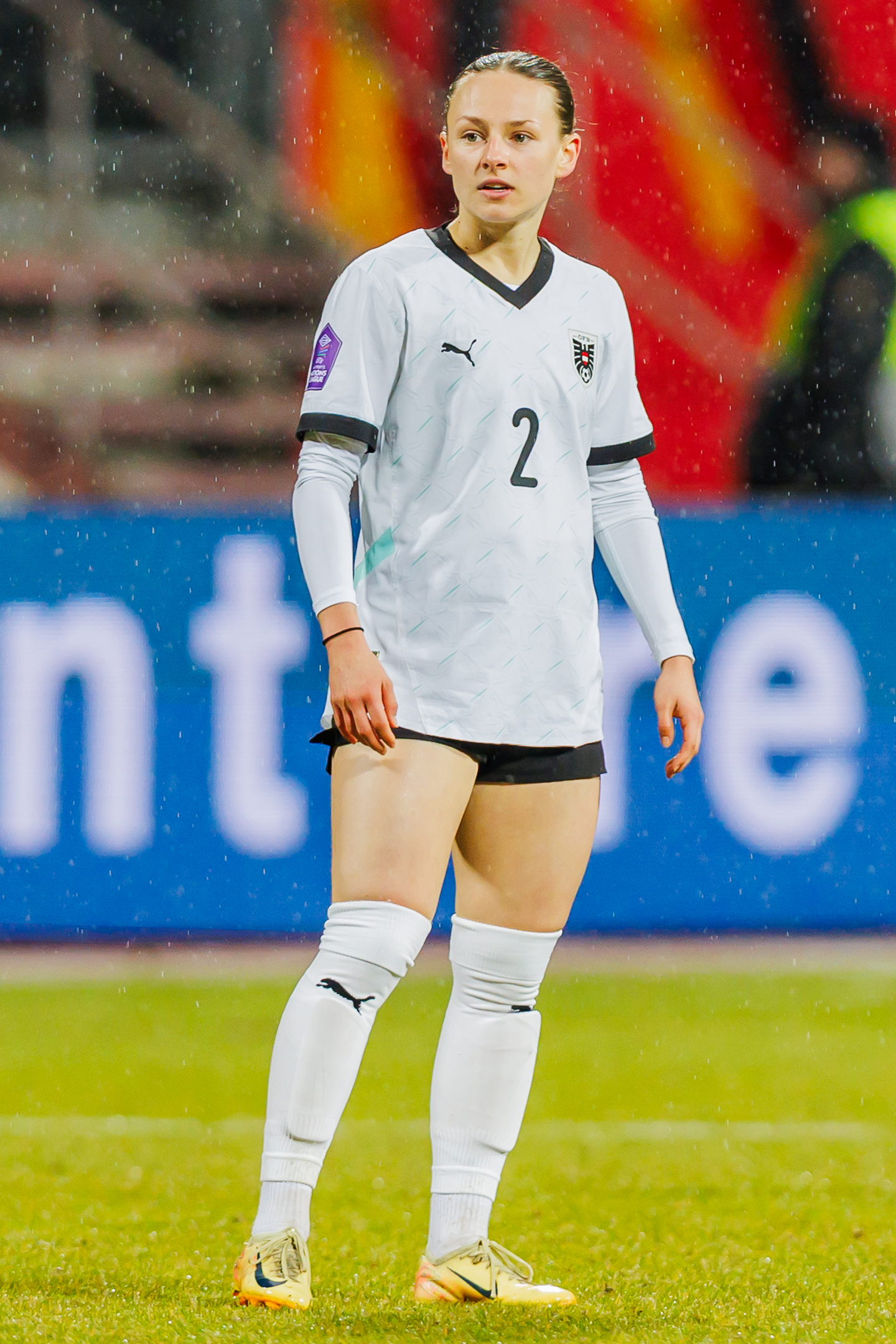
- D'Angelo with Austria in 2025

Personal information
- Full name: Chiara Anna D'Angelo
- Date of birth: 31 July 2004 (age 22)
- Place of birth: Villach, Austria
- Height: 1.57 m (5 ft 2 in)
- Position: Full-back

Team information
- Current team: Werder Bremen
- Number: 2

Youth career
- –2021: ÖFB Frauen-Akademie

Senior career*
Years	Team	Apps	(Gls)
2019–2021	Sturm Graz II		
2019–2021	Sturm Graz	19	(0)
2021–2023	USV Neulengbach	19	(2)
2021–2023	USV Neulengbach II		
2023–2025	SKN St. Pölten		
2023–2024	→ TSG 1899 Hoffenheim II (loan)	6	(0)
2023–2024	→ TSG 1899 Hoffenheim (loan)	5	(0)
2025–	Werder Bremen	28	(0)

International career^{‡}
- Austria U17
- Austria U19
- Austria U20
2025–	Austria	12	(1)
- * Club domestic league appearances and goals as of 30 August 2026 ‡ National team caps and goals as of 9 June 2026

Chiara Anna D'Angelo (born 31 July 2004) is an Austrian professional footballer who plays as a full-back for Frauen-Bundesliga club Werder Bremen and the Austria national team.

== Club career ==
D'Angelo joined Frauen-Bundesliga club TSG 1899 Hoffenheim on loan from ÖFB Frauen Bundesliga club SKN St. Pölten in July 2023.

She returned to SKN St. Pölten in February 2025.

In 2025 it was announced that D'Angelo would move to Frauen-Bundesliga side Werder Bremen for the 2025–26 season.

== International career ==
D'Angelo has made three appearances for the Austria senior national team, having previously represented Austria at youth level.

== Career statistics ==
As of match played 14 April 2026

Scores and results list Austria's goal tally first, score column indicates score after each D'Angelo goal.

List of international goals scored by Chiara D'Angelo
No.	Date	Venue	Opponent	Score	Result	Competition
1	14 April 2026	Max-Morlock-Stadion, Nuremberg, Germany	Germany	1–5	1–5	2027 FIFA World Cup qualification

== Style of play ==
D'Angelo is two-footed and an attack-minded full-back.
