= 2024–25 ÖFB Frauen Bundesliga =

Austrian women's football league season

ÖFB Frauen Bundesliga
- Season: 2024–25
- Dates: 10 August 2024 – TBD 2025
- Champions League: SKN St. Pölten; FK Austria Wien
- Europa Cup: SK Sturm Graz
- Matches: 117
- Goals: 315 (2.69 per match)
- Top goalscorer: (Germany) Verena Volkmer (16 Goals)
- All statistics correct as of 18 May 2025.

The 2024–25 of the ÖFB Bundesliga, also known as ADMIRAL Bundesliga for sponsorship reasons, is the 52nd edition of the Austrian top-level women's league. Starting with the 2024–25 season, the ÖFB Bundesliga follows a new format, with a four-team championship round and a six-team qualification round.

SKN St. Pölten are the defending champions, winning their 9th title in the 2023–24 season.

The 2024–25 season opened on 10 August 2024 with a rescheduled third matchday bout between SKN St. Pölten and First Vienna FC, ahead of the first matchday on 14 August 2024. The regular season concludes on 23 March 2025.

== Teams ==
Locations of teams in the 2024–25 ÖFB Bundesliga.

=== Team changes ===
Entering league	Exiting league
Promoted from 2023 to 2024 2. Bundesliga	Relegated to 2024–25 2. Bundesliga
Linzer ASK	FC Wacker Innsbruck

== Regular season ==
Pos	Team	Pld	W	D	L	GF	GA	GD	Pts	Qualification
1	SKN St. Pölten	18	14	3	1	53	8	+45	45	Advances to the championship round
2	FK Austria Wien	18	12	4	2	42	6	+36	40	Advances to the championship round
3	First Vienna FC	18	10	3	5	31	23	+8	33	Advances to the championship round
4	SK Sturm Graz	18	9	4	5	24	16	+8	31	Advances to the championship round
5	SCR Altach	18	7	1	10	23	30	−7	22	Participates in the qualification round
6	FC Bergheim	18	4	9	5	12	16	−4	21	Participates in the qualification round
7	SV Neulengbach	18	5	5	8	15	25	−10	20	Participates in the qualification round
8	Blau-Weiß Linz/Union Kleinmünchen (Note: The two clubs operate the women's team jointly.)	18	5	1	12	14	37	−23	16	Participates in the qualification round
9	Lustenau/Dornbirn	18	3	4	11	12	36	−24	13	Participates in the qualification round
10	Linzer ASK	18	4	0	14	17	46	−29	12	Participates in the qualification round

Updated to match(es) played on 23 March 2025. Source: OEFB.at
Rules for classification: 1) Points; 2) Goal difference; 3) Number of goals scored; 4) Head-to-head points; 5) Head-to-head goal difference; 6) Head-to-head away goals scored;

=== Results ===
Home \ Away	ALT	BER	GRA	L/K	LIN	L/D	NEU	STP	WIA	WIF
SCR Altach	—	3–1	1–3	5–0	3–0	2–0	3–0	0–3	0–3	1–3
FC Bergheim	0–0	—	0–0	1–0	2–0	0–0	0–0	0–0	0–0	1–1
SK Sturm Graz	1–0	2–0	—	0–1	3–2	3–0	1–0	0–3	1–2	2–1
Blau-Weiß Linz/Union Kleinmünchen	1–2	1–2	0–3	—	2–1	3–2	0–0	0–4	1–4	2–0
Linzer ASK	1–0	0–2	2–1	1–3	—	2–3	1–0	1–6	0–2	3–2
Lustenau/Dornbirn	0–2	0–0	1–2	3–0	1–0	—	1–1	0–3	0–5	1–2
SV Neulengbach	2–0	1–1	1–0	2–0	4–2	3–0	—	0–3	0–5	1–2
SKN St. Pölten	2–1	4–2	1–1	3–0	4–0	3–0	4–0	—	1–1	6–0
FK Austria Wien	5–0	2–0	0–0	2–0	6–0	0–0	2–0	0–2	—	0–1
First Vienna FC	5–0	2–0	1–1	2–0	2–0	5–0	0–0	2–1	0–3	—

Updated to match(es) played on 23 March 2025. Source: OEFB.at
Legend: Blue = home team win; Yellow = draw; Red = away team win.

== Championship round ==
Pos	Team	Pld	W	D	L	GF	GA	GD	Pts		STP	WIA	GRA	WIF
1	SKN St. Pölten (C)	24	18	5	1	67	11	+56	59	Qualification to Champions League third qualifying round		2–0	3–0	3–1
2	FK Austria Wien	24	13	7	4	51	13	+38	46	Qualification to Champions League second qualifying round	1–1		0–1	1–1
3	SK Sturm Graz	24	11	6	7	29	23	+6	39	Qualification to Europa Cup first qualifying round	1–1	2–2		1–0
4	First Vienna FC	24	11	4	9	34	37	−3	37		0–4	0–5	1–0	

Updated to match(es) played on 18 May 2025. Source: OEFB.at
Rules for classification: 1) Points; 2) Goal difference; 3) Number of goals scored; 4) Head-to-head points; 5) Head-to-head goal difference; 6) Head-to-head away goals scored;
(C) Champions

== Qualification round ==
Pos	Team	Pld	W	D	L	GF	GA	GD	Pts	Relegation	ALT	BER	LIK/LIK	NEU	LIN	LUD/LUD
1	SCR Altach	23	12	1	10	34	31	+3	37			1–0	1–0		1–0	
2	FC Bergheim	23	6	10	7	18	20	−2	28					1–0	1–2	3–0
3	Blau-Weiß Linz/Union Kleinmünchen	23	7	3	13	18	39	−21	24			1–1				2–0
4	SV Neulengbach	23	5	7	11	19	32	−13	22		1–2		0–1		2–2	
5	Linzer ASK	23	6	2	15	31	51	−20	20				0–0			10–0
6	Lustenau/Dornbirn	23	3	5	15	14	58	−44	14	Relegation to the 2. Bundesliga	0–6			1–1		

Updated to match(es) played on 11 May 2025. Source: OEFB.at
Rules for classification: 1) Points; 2) Goal difference; 3) Number of goals scored; 4) Head-to-head points; 5) Head-to-head goal difference; 6) Head-to-head away goals scored;

== Statistics ==
=== Top goalscorers ===
As of 18 May 2025

Rank	Player	Club	Goals
1	(Germany) Verena Volkmer	FK Austria Wien	16
2	(Austria) Melanie Brunnthaler	SKN St. Pölten	8
3	(Austria) Sophie Hillebrand	SKN St. Pölten	8
4	(Austria) Carina Brunold	SKN St. Pölten/Lustenau/Dornbirn	8
5	(Czech Republic) Kamila Dubcová	SKN St. Pölten	7
6	(Czech Republic) Alzbeta Nemcova	Linzer ASK	7
7	(Denmark) Sandra Jakobsen	SK Sturm Graz	7
8	(Slovakia) Mária Mikolajová	SKN St. Pölten	6
9	(Turkey) Melike Pekel	SKN St. Pölten	6
10	(Austria) Lena Triendl	FK Austria Wien	6
11	(Italy) Elisa Pfattner	SV Neulengbach	6
12	(Germany) Isabella Jaron	SCR Altach	5
13	(Austria) Magdalena Rukavina	First Vienna FC	5
14	(Germany) Rieke Tietz	SCR Altach	5
15	(Denmark) Maria Agerholm Olsen	FK Austria Wien	5

=== Clean sheets ===
As of 24 November 2024

Rank	Player	Team	Clean sheets
1	(Austria) Larissa Haidner	FK Austria Wien	8
2	(Germany) Carina Schlüter	SKN St. Pölten	7
2	(Austria) Michaela Fischer	FC Bergheim	7
4	(Austria) Larissa Rusek	SV Neulengbach	5
4	(Finland) Fanny Söderström	Lustenau/Dornbirn	5
4	(Germany) Lourdes Romero	SK Sturm Graz	5
7	(Austria) Pia Piplits	First Vienna FC	2
7	(Austria) Christina Schönwetter	First Vienna FC	2
7	(Austria) Janine Koretic	SCR Altach	2
10	(Germany) Sarah-Lisa Dübel	SCR Altach	1
10	(Austria) Vanessa Gritzner	SK Sturm Graz	1
10	(Germany) Katharina Prummer	FC Bergheim	1
10	(Germany) Laura Sieger	SKN St. Pölten	1
10	(Austria) Sarah Trinkl	Linzer ASK	1
10	(Austria) Lara Ritter	Blau-Weiß Linz/Union Kleinmünchen	1
