= FK Austria Wien (women) =

- Full name: Fußballklub Austria Wien
- Founded: July 1, 2015; 11 years ago
- Ground: Generali Arena, Vienna
- Capacity: 17,500
- President: Frank Hensel
- Section manager: Lisa Makas
- Manager: Stefan Kenesei
- League: ÖFB Frauen Bundesliga
- 2025–26: 1st (champions)
| Home colours | Away colours | Third colours |

FK Austria Wien is an Austrian women's football club based in Favoriten, Vienna.

== History ==
=== Partnership with USC Landhaus (2015–2021) ===
In 2015, the club began as a joint venture with USC Landhaus Wien. Initially, the Austria Wien Ladies competed in the Wiener Landesliga during the 2017–18 season. From 2018 to 2021, the first team played as SG USC Landhaus/FK Austria Wien in the ÖFB Frauen Bundesliga.

=== Independent era (since 2021) ===
Starting in the 2021–22 season, both senior and reserve teams operated under the Austria Wien name. In the 2024–25 season, Austria Wien finished second in the league to secure qualification to Champions League second qualifying round. In the meantime, Verena Volkmer became the first Austria Wien player to achieve the league's top scorer in two consecutive seasons.

On 14 May 2026, the club won their first-ever ÖFB Frauen Cup title, defeating FC Red Bull Salzburg 1–0 in the final, with Katharina Schiechtl scoring the winning goal. Later that month, on 30 May, they won their first ÖFB Frauen Bundesliga title in the 2025–26 season, clinching the championship with a dramatic 1–1 draw against SKN St. Pölten on the final matchday, following a late stoppage-time goal from Carina Wenninger.

== Honours ==
- ÖFB Frauen Bundesliga:
  - Winner (1): 2025–26
- ÖFB Frauen Cup:
  - Winner (1): 2025–26
  - Runner-up (2): 2023–24, 2024–25

== Squad ==
As of 4 July 2026

Note: Flags indicate national team as defined under FIFA eligibility rules; some limited exceptions apply. Players may hold more than one non-FIFA nationality.

| No. | Pos. | Nation | Player |
|---|---|---|---|
| 1 | GK | AUT | Jasmin Pal |
| 2 | DF | AUT | Louise Schöffel |
| 5 | DF | AUT | Tatjana Weiss |
| 6 | MF | AUT | Katharina Moser |
| 7 | FW | DEN | Maria Kirchmann |
| 8 | DF | AUT | Katharina Schiechtl |
| 9 | FW | AUT | Alisa Ziletkina |
| 10 | MF | AUT | Stefanie Schneeberger |
| 11 | MF | AUT | Almedina Šišić |
| 12 | GK | AUT | Emma Eichberger |
| 13 | DF | AUT | Virginia Kirchberger |
| 14 | MF | AUT | Angela Pnishi |
| 17 | DF | AUT | Alexandra Wölkart |

| No. | Pos. | Nation | Player |
|---|---|---|---|
| 18 | DF | AUT | Verena Hanshaw |
| 19 | FW | AUT | Emily Schäfer |
| 20 | FW | GER | Julia Kappenberger |
| 22 | FW | KOS | Modesta Uka |
| 23 | DF | AUT | Carina Wenninger |
| 24 | MF | AUT | Yvonne Weilharter |
| 25 | GK | AUT | Nadine Hinterberger |
| 26 | DF | AUT | Anna Schorn |
| 28 | MF | AUT | Lena Triendl |
| 29 | MF | ITA | Elisa Pfattner |
| 42 | MF | AUT | Valeria Buric |
| 99 | FW | CRO | Antea Batarilo |
| — | MF | GER | Lotta Cordes |

== Current staff ==
As of 11 July 2025

Coaching staff
| (Austria) Stefan Kenesei | Head coach |
| (Austria) Georg Konstandeas | Assistant coach |
| (Austria) Max Paukner | Goalkeeping coach |
| (Italy) Mauro Vasile | Athletic trainer |
| (Austria) Alina Waldecker (Austria) Violetta Herunter (Austria) Clemens Reisner | Physiotherapist |
| (Austria) Niklas Pichler | Team manager |
