= Jasmin Pal =

Austrian footballer

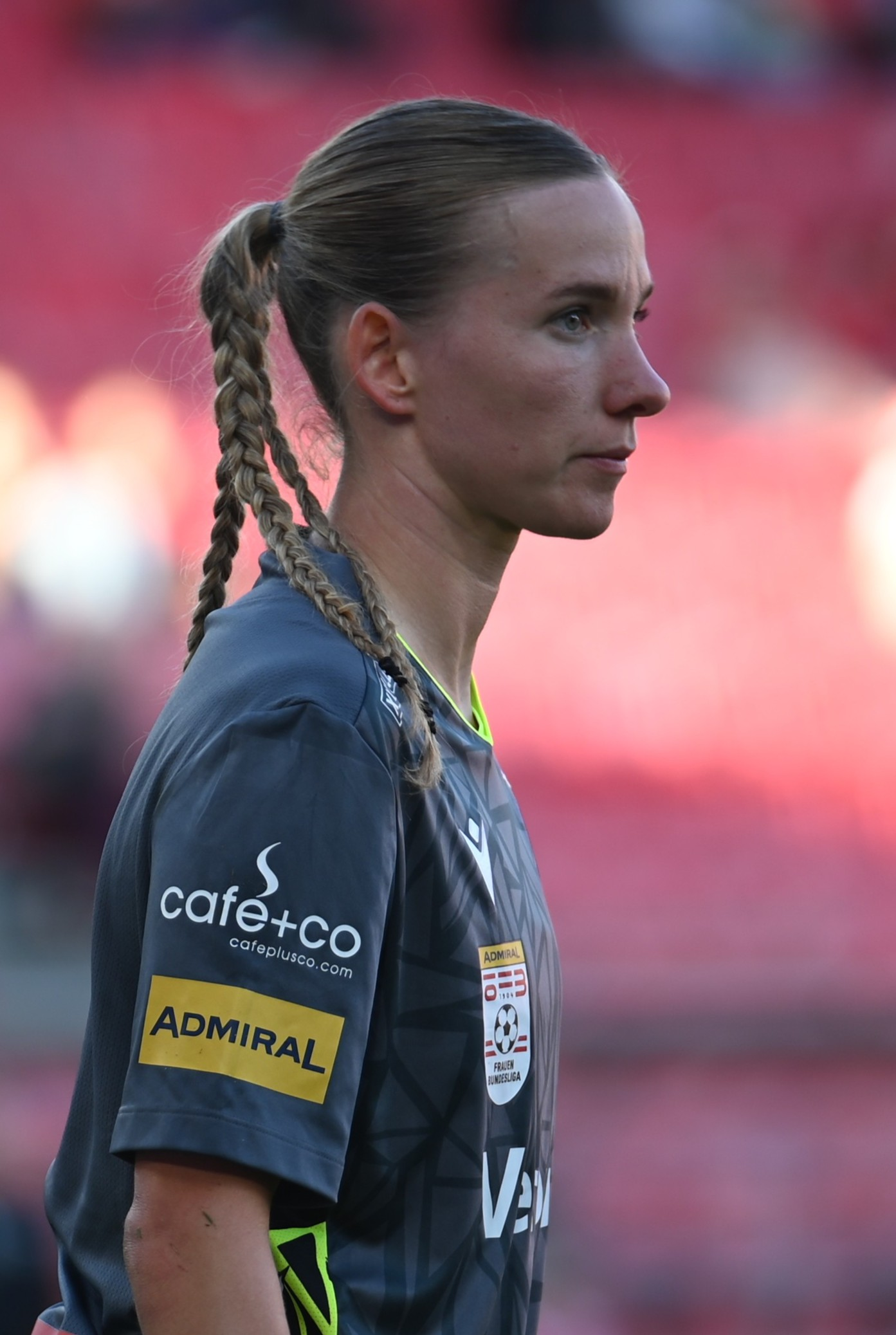
- Pal in 2026

Personal information
- Date of birth: 24 August 1996 (age 30)
- Place of birth: Innsbruck, Austria
- Height: 1.74 m (5 ft 9 in)
- Position: Goalkeeper

Team information
- Current team: FK Austria Wien
- Number: 1

Youth career
- 2003–2004: SK Wilten
- 2004–2005: SV Hall
- 2005–2006: Innsbrucker SK
- 2006–2009: Innsbrucker AC
- 2009–2015: FC Wacker Innsbruck

Senior career*
| Years | Team | Apps | (Gls) |
| 2015–2016 | BV Cloppenburg | 0 | (0) |
| 2016–2020 | Wacker Innsbruck | | |
| 2020–2022 | SC Sand | 25 | (0) |
| 2022–2025 | 1. FC Köln | 21 | (0) |
| 2022–2025 | 1. FC Köln II | 2 | (0) |
| 2025– | FK Austria Wien | 32 | (0) |

International career^{‡}
| 2021– | Austria | 7 | (0) |
- * Club domestic league appearances and goals as of 21 November 2026 ‡ National team caps and goals as of 14 October 2026

Jasmin Pal (born 24 August 1996) is an Austrian footballer who plays as a goalkeeper for FK Austria Wien.

== Club career ==
Pal began her senior career with BV Cloppenburg before moving to Wacker Innsbruck in 2016. In 2020, she returned to Germany to sign with SC Sand, and two years later, she transferred to 1. FC Köln. On 30 June 2025, Pal signed a two-year contract with FK Austria Wien.

== International career ==
Pal was also part of the Austrian team at the 2022 European Championships.

== Honours ==
- ÖFB Frauen-Bundesliga 2025/26
- ÖFB Frauen Cup 2025/26
