= Kamila Dubcová =

Czech footballer (born 1999)

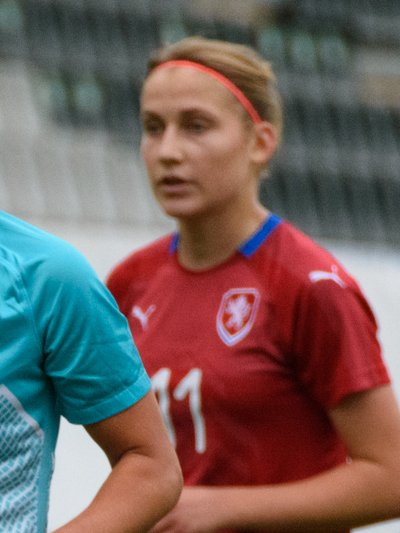
- Dubcová playing for the Czech Republic in 2018

Personal information
- Date of birth: 17 January 1999 (age 27)
- Place of birth: Valašské Meziříčí, Czech Republic
- Position: Midfielder

Team information
- Current team: Slavia Prague
- Number: 48

Youth career
- Slovácko

Senior career*
Years	Team	Apps	(Gls)
2017–2018	Slovácko		
2018–2019	Slavia Prague	19	(13)
2019–2022	Sassuolo	52	(18)
2022–2024	AC Milan	25	(1)
2024–2025	St. Pölten	0	(0)
2025–	Slavia Prague	0	(0)

International career^{‡}
2017–	Czech Republic	36	(10)
- * Club domestic league appearances and goals as of 24 July 2023 ‡ National team caps and goals as of 24 July 2023

Kamila Dubcová (born 17 January 1999) is a Czech professional footballer who plays as a midfielder for Czech Women's First League club Slavia Prague and the Czech Republic women's national team. She's the twin sister of Michaela Dubcová who retired as a professional footballer in 2023 at the age of 25 to become assistant coach at AC Milan.

== Career ==
Dubcová has been capped for the Czech Republic national team, appearing for the team during qualifying for the 2019 FIFA Women's World Cup and 2023 FIFA Women's World Cup, plus qualifying for Euro 2022 and Euro 2025.

== Honours ==
St. Pölten

- ÖFB Frauen Bundesliga: 2024–25
- ÖFB Frauen Cup: 2024–25

Slavia Prague

- Czech Women's First League: 2018–19
- Czech Women's Cup: 2019

Individual

- Czech Footballer of the Year (1): 2024

== International goals ==
No.	Date	Venue	Opponent	Score	Result	Competition
1.	14 June 2019	Letní stadion, Chomutov, Czech Republic	Russia	1–0	2–0	Friendly
2.	4 March 2019	Antonis Papadopoulos Stadium, Larnaca, Cyprus	South Africa	1–1	2–1	2019 Cyprus Women's Cup
3.	4 March 2019	Antonis Papadopoulos Stadium, Larnaca, Cyprus	South Africa	2–1	2–1	2019 Cyprus Women's Cup
4.	7 November 2019	Bayil Arena, Baku, Azerbaijan	Azerbaijan	4–0	4–0	UEFA Women's Euro 2022 qualifying
5.	22 September 2020	Stadion Miejski, Bielsko-Biała, Poland	Poland	2–0	2–0	UEFA Women's Euro 2022 qualifying
6.	1 December 2020	Letní stadion, Chomutov, Czech Republic	Moldova	5–0	7–0	UEFA Women's Euro 2022 qualifying
7.	21 September 2021	Stadion u Nisy, Liberec, Czech Republic	Cyprus	3–0	8–0	2023 FIFA Women's World Cup qualification
8.	1 September 2022	AEK Arena – Georgios Karapatakis, Larnaca, Cyprus	Cyprus	2–0	6–0	2023 FIFA Women's World Cup qualification
9.	6 September 2022	Antonis Papadopoulos Stadium, Larnaca, Cyprus	Belarus	3–0	7–0	2023 FIFA Women's World Cup qualification
10.	31 October 2023	Malšovická aréna, Hradec Králové, Czech Republic	Bosnia and Herzegovina	1–1	2–2	2023–24 UEFA Women's Nations League
11.	5 December 2023	CFIG Arena, Pardubice, Czech Republic	Slovenia	1–0	4–0	2023–24 UEFA Women's Nations League
12.	31 May 2024	Eden Arena, Prague, Czech Republic	Belgium	1–2	1–2	UEFA Women's Euro 2025 qualifying
13.	4 June 2024	Stayen, Sint-Truiden, Belgium	Belgium	1–0	1–1	UEFA Women's Euro 2025 qualifying
14.	25 October 2024	Gradski stadion Velika Gorica, Velika Gorica, Croatia	Belarus	4–1	8–1	UEFA Women's Euro 2025 qualifying play-offs
15.	25 October 2024	Gradski stadion Velika Gorica, Velika Gorica, Croatia	Belarus	5–1	8–1	UEFA Women's Euro 2025 qualifying play-offs
16.	30 May 2025	Letní stadion, Chomutov, Czech Republic	Croatia	4–0	5–0	2025 UEFA Women's Nations League
17.	18 April 2026	Gradski stadion, Nikšić, Montenegro	Montenegro	4–1	4–1	2027 FIFA Women's World Cup qualification
