= 2025–26 ÖFB Frauen Bundesliga =

Austrian women's football league season

ÖFB Frauen Bundesliga
- Season: 2025–26
- Dates: 15 August 2025 – 30 May 2026
- Champions: FK Austria Wien (1st title)
- Relegated: SV Neulengbach
- Champions League: FK Austria Wien; SKN St. Pölten
- Europa Cup: SK Sturm Graz

The 2025–26 season of the ÖFB Frauen Bundesliga is the 53rd edition of Austria's top-level women's association football league. The competition is the highest division in Austrian women's football and would determine the national champion as well as qualification for UEFA competitions.

SKN St. Pölten are the defending champions, winning their 10th title in the 2024–25 season.

== Teams ==
Locations of teams in the 2024–25 ÖFB Bundesliga.

=== Team changes ===
Entering league	Exiting league
Promoted from 2024–25 2. Bundesliga	Relegated to 2025–26 2. Bundesliga
Südburgenland/Hartberg	Lustenau/Dornbirn

== Regular season ==
Pos	Team	Pld	W	D	L	GF	GA	GD	Pts	Qualification
1	FK Austria Wien	18	17	1	0	52	5	+47	52	Championship group qualification
2	SKN St. Pölten	18	15	1	2	60	10	+50	46	Championship group qualification
3	SK Sturm Graz	18	11	1	6	40	23	+17	34	Championship group qualification
4	FC Red Bull Salzburg (Note: FC Red Bull Salzburg took over FC Bergheim.)	18	8	4	6	35	34	+1	28	Championship group qualification
5	SCR Altach	18	8	4	6	32	34	−2	28	Qualification group
6	First Vienna FC	18	7	4	7	32	33	−1	25	Qualification group
7	Linzer ASK	18	6	2	10	18	30	−12	20	Qualification group
8	SV Neulengbach	18	3	3	12	13	34	−21	12	Qualification group
9	SPG Blau-Weiß Linz/Union Kleinmünchen (Note: The two clubs operate the women's team jointly.)	18	3	0	15	14	45	−31	9	Qualification group
10	Südburgenland/Hartberg (Note: The two clubs operate the women's team jointly.)	18	1	2	15	23	71	−48	5	Qualification group

Updated to match(es) played on 29 March 2026. Source: OEFB.at
Rules for classification: 1) Points; 2) Goal difference; 3) Goals scored; 4) Head-to-head points; 5) Head-to-head goal difference; 6) Head-to-head away goals scored;

== Championship group ==
Pos	Team	Pld	W	D	L	GF	GA	GD	Pts	
1	FK Austria Wien (Q)	6	2	4	0	6	3	+3	62	Qualification to Champions League second qualifying round
2	SKN St. Pölten (Q)	6	4	2	0	12	3	+9	60	Qualification to Champions League second qualifying round
3	SK Sturm Graz (Q)	6	1	1	4	7	12	−5	38	Qualification to Europa Cup first qualifying round
4	FC Red Bull Salzburg	6	0	3	3	2	9	−7	31	

Updated to match(es) played on 30 May 2026. Source: OEFB.at
Rules for classification: 1) Points; 2) Goal difference; 3) Goals scored; 4) Head-to-head points; 5) Head-to-head goal difference; 6) Head-to-head away goals scored;
(Q) Qualified for the phase indicated

== Qualification round ==
Pos	Team	Pld	W	D	L	GF	GA	GD	Pts	
1	First Vienna FC	4	4	0	0	12	3	+9	37	
2	SCR Altach	4	0	2	2	4	7	−3	30	
3	Linzer ASK	4	2	1	1	5	3	+2	27	
4	SPG Blau-Weiß Linz/Union Kleinmünchen	4	1	1	2	3	6	−3	13	
5	SV Neulengbach (R, E)	0	0	0	0	0	0	0	12	Excluded and folded
6	Südburgenland/Hartberg	4	0	2	2	5	10	−5	7	

Updated to match(es) played on 23 May 2026. Source: OEFB.at
Rules for classification: 1) Points; 2) Goal difference; 3) Goals scored; 4) Head-to-head points; 5) Head-to-head goal difference; 6) Head-to-head away goals scored;
(E) Eliminated; (R) Relegated

== See also ==
- 2025–26 Austrian Football Bundesliga
