= Lena Triendl =

Austrian footballer (born 2000)

Personal information
- Date of birth: 10 March 2000 (age 26)
- Place of birth: Seefeld in Tirol, Austria
- Position: Midfielder

Team information
- Current team: Austria Wien
- Number: 18

Senior career*
Years	Team	Apps	(Gls)
2015–2021	FC Wacker Innsbruck	27	(5)
2021–2022	SC Sand	20	(0)
2022	Werder Bremen	5	(0)
2023	FFC Vorderland	3	(0)
2023–	Austria Wien	18	(3)
- * Club domestic league appearances and goals

Lena Triendl (born 10 March 2000) is an Austrian footballer who plays as a midfielder for Austria Wien.

== Honours ==
- ÖFB Frauen-Bundesliga 2025/26
- ÖFB Frauen Cup 2025/26
