= Elisa Pfattner =

Italian footballer (born 2004)

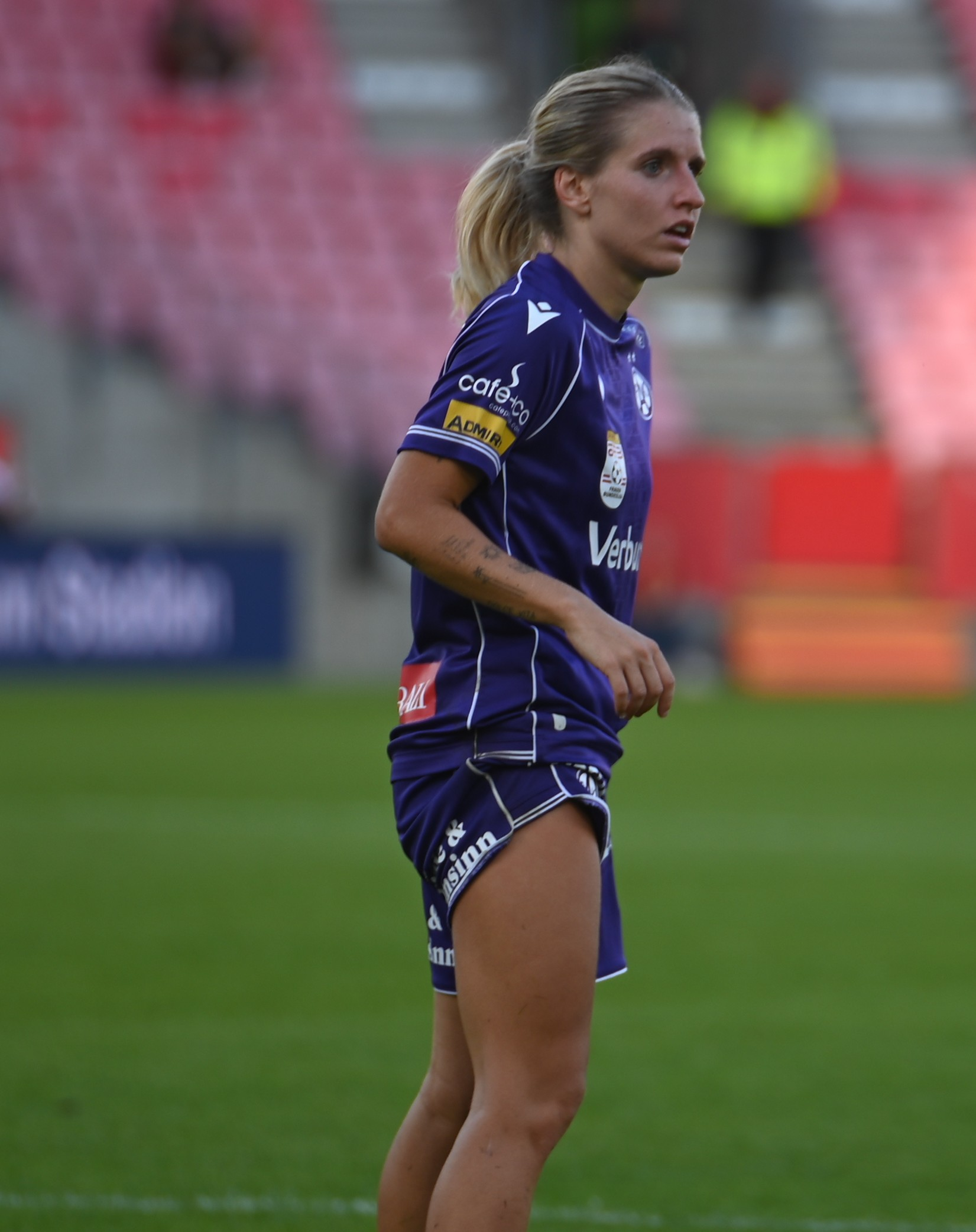

Personal information
- Date of birth: 26 April 2004 (age 22)
- Place of birth: Brixen, Italy
- Position: Forward

Team information
- Current team: FK Austria Wien
- Number: 29

Youth career
- Juventus

Senior career*
Years	Team	Apps	(Gls)
2021–2025	Juventus		
2023–2025	→ SV Neulengbach (loan)		
2025–	Austria Wien		

International career
- Italy U19
- Italy U23
- * Club domestic league appearances and goals

Elisa Pfattner (born 26 April 2004) is an Italian footballer who plays for ÖFB Frauen Bundesliga club Austria Wien.

== Club career ==
Pfattner started her career at Juventus, then joined Austrian side SV Neulengbach on loan for two seasons. On July 2, 2025, she signed for fellow Austrian side FK Austria Wien.

== International career ==
Pfattner has represented Italy at youth level.

== Honours ==
- ÖFB Frauen-Bundesliga 2025/26
- ÖFB Frauen Cup 2025/26
