= SKN St. Pölten (women) =

Austrian women's football team

- Full name: Sportklub Niederösterreich St. Pölten
- Founded: 2006; 20 years ago
- Ground: NV Arena & SPORT.CENTER.Lower Austria
- Capacity: 250
- Manager: Celia Brancão
- League: ÖFB-Frauenliga
- 2025–26: 2nd
- Website: https://www.skn-stpoelten.at/frauen/
Home colours	Away colours

Sportklub Niederösterreich St. Pölten is an Austrian women's football team, based in St. Pölten (pronounced [zaŋkt ˈpœltn̩]).

The women's team was formed in 2006 at the club ASV Spratzern, then from 2013 to 2016 played under the name FSK St. Pölten-Spratzern. They connected to the men's club for the 2016–17 season. The team currently competes in the ÖFB-Frauenliga, the top-level league of women's football in Austria. The team won the national ÖFB Ladies Cup in 2013 and 2014, as well the consecutive league and cup doubles from 2015 to 2017.

== History ==
Season history
Season	League	Level	Place
2006/07	Gebietsliga West	IV	1st
2007/08	NÖN-Frauenliga	III	5th
2008/09	NÖN-Frauenliga	III	1st
2009/10	2. Liga Ost	II	1st
2010/11	2. Liga Ost	II	1st
2011/12	ÖFB-Frauenliga	I	2nd
2012/13	ÖFB-Frauenliga	I	2nd
2013/14	ÖFB-Frauenliga	I	2nd
2014/15	ÖFB-Frauenliga	I	1st
2015/16	ÖFB-Frauenliga	I	1st
2016/17	ÖFB-Frauenliga	I	1st
2017/18	ÖFB-Frauenliga	I	1st
2018/19	ÖFB-Frauenliga	I	1st
2019/20	Season cancelled due to COVID-19 pandemic		
2020/21	ÖFB-Frauenliga	I	1st
2021/22	ÖFB-Frauenliga	I	1st
2022/23	ÖFB-Frauenliga	I	1st
2023/24	ÖFB-Frauenliga	I	1st
2024/25	ÖFB-Frauenliga	I	1st
2025/26	ÖFB-Frauenliga	I	2nd
2026/27	ÖFB-Frauenliga	I	TBD
Green background: promotion

ASV Spratzern was founded in 1920 and a club women's section was established in 2006.

The team was promoted to the top-level league in 2010–11 season. In the 2012–13 season they secured a top two finish behind SV Neulengbach, enough to secure Austria's second UEFA Women's Champions League spot. They played in the 2013–14 UEFA Women's Champions League round of 32, but were defeated by Torres of Italy.

The team was renamed in 2013 to include the larger town of St. Pölten and FSK set focus on being a women's club.

In 2015 the team won their first championship. Their title ended a twelve-year title-winning streak from Neulengbach. The defended the title one year later.

In 2016 the team connected to the SKN St. Pölten.

== Continental record ==
Season	Competition	Round	Club	Home	Away	Aggregate
2013–14	UEFA Women's Champions League	Round of 32	(Italy) Torres	2–2	1–3	3–5
2015–16	UEFA Women's Champions League	Round of 32	(Italy) Verona	4–5	2–2	6–7
2016–17	UEFA Women's Champions League	Round of 32	(Denmark) Brøndby IF Women	0–2	2–2	2–4
2017–18	UEFA Women's Champions League	Round of 32	(England) Manchester City	0–3	0–3	0–6
2018–19	UEFA Women's Champions League	Round of 32	(France) Paris Saint-Germain	1–4	0–2	1–6
2019–20	UEFA Women's Champions League	Round of 32	(Netherlands) Twente	2–4	2–1	4–5
2020–21	UEFA Women's Champions League	First qualifying round	(Kosovo) Mitrovica	2–0		
2020–21	UEFA Women's Champions League	Second qualifying round	(Russia) CSKA Moscow	1–0		
2020–21	UEFA Women's Champions League	Round of 32	(Switzerland) Zürich	2–0	1–0	3–0
2020–21	UEFA Women's Champions League	Round of 16	(Sweden) Rosengård	0–2	2–2	2–4
2021–22	UEFA Women's Champions League	First qualifying round	(Turkey) Beşiktaş	7–0		
2021–22	UEFA Women's Champions League	First qualifying round	(Italy) Juventus	1–4		
2022–23	UEFA Women's Champions League	First qualifying round	(North Macedonia) Ljuboten	7–0		
2022–23	UEFA Women's Champions League	First qualifying round	(Belarus) Dinamo-BGU Minsk	3–0		
2022–23	UEFA Women's Champions League	Second qualifying round	(Finland) KuPS	2–2 (a.e.t.)	1–0	3–2
2022–23	UEFA Women's Champions League	Group B	(Germany) Wolfsburg	2–8	0–4	3rd
2022–23	UEFA Women's Champions League	Group B	(Italy) Roma	3–4	0–5	3rd
2022–23	UEFA Women's Champions League	Group B	(Czech Republic) Slavia Prague	1–1	1–0	3rd
2023–24	UEFA Women's Champions League	First qualifying round	(Greece) PAOK	3–0		
2023–24	UEFA Women's Champions League	Second qualifying round	(Iceland) Valur	0–1	4–0	4–1
2023–24	UEFA Women's Champions League	Group B	(Norway) Brann	1–2	1–2	4th
2023–24	UEFA Women's Champions League	Group B	(France) Lyon	0–7	0–2	4th
2023–24	UEFA Women's Champions League	Group B	(Czech Republic) Slavia Prague	0–0	0–1	4th
2024–25	UEFA Women's Champions League	First qualifying round	(Azerbaijan) Neftchi Baku	5–0		
2024–25	UEFA Women's Champions League	First qualifying round	(Albania) Vllaznia	1–0		
2024–25	UEFA Women's Champions League	Second qualifying round	(Slovenia) ŽNK Mura	3–0	5–0	8–0
2024–25	UEFA Women's Champions League	Group D	(Sweden) Hammarby	1–2	0–2	4th
2024–25	UEFA Women's Champions League	Group D	(England) Manchester City	2–3	0–2	4th
2024–25	UEFA Women's Champions League	Group D	(Spain) Barcelona	1–4	0–7	4th
2025–26	UEFA Women's Champions League	Third qualifying round	(Denmark) Fortuna Hjørring	3–1	2–1	5–2
2025–26	UEFA Women's Champions League	League phase	(Spain) Atlético Madrid	0–6		18th
2025–26	UEFA Women's Champions League	League phase	(France) OL Lyonnes		0–3	18th
2025–26	UEFA Women's Champions League	League phase	(England) Chelsea	0–6		18th
2025–26	UEFA Women's Champions League	League phase	(Norway) Vålerenga		2–2	18th
2025–26	UEFA Women's Champions League	League phase	(Italy) Juventus	0–5		18th
2025–26	UEFA Women's Champions League	League phase	(Italy) AS Roma		1–6	18th

== Current squad ==
As of 7 July 2026

Note: Flags indicate national team as defined under FIFA eligibility rules; some limited exceptions apply. Players may hold more than one non-FIFA nationality.

No.	Pos.	Nation	Player
1	GK	AUT	Amelie Kandlhofer ( (Note: These players are on the Champions League roster, but not on the League roster.))
2	DF	AUT	Chiara D'Angelo
3	DF	GER	Anna Johanning
4	DF	CRO	Leonarda Balog
7	MF	SVK	Mária Mikolajová
8	MF	AUT	Claudia Wenger
9	FW	GER	Rita Schumacher
10	MF	SUI	Isabelle Meyer
11	FW	AUT	Valentina Mädl
14	DF	SVK	Alexandra Biroova
17	FW	GER	Sarah Mattner-Trembleau ( (Note: Listed as a different position, between UEFA and League rosters.))
18	FW	AUT	Melanie Brunnthaler

No.	Pos.	Nation	Player
20	MF	AUT	Sophie Hillebrand
21	DF	SLO	Izabela Križaj
22	MF	AUT	Jennifer Klein
23	MF	CRO	Andrea Glibo
24	FW	SLO	Mateja Zver
27	DF	SUI	Ella Touon
28	GK	GER	Laura Sieger
30	GK	AUT	Melissa Abiral
33	GK	GER	Carina Schlüter
38	FW	TUR	Melike Pekel
48	MF	CZE	Kamila Dubcová
77	DF	SVK	Diana Lemesova
89	MF	CRO	Tea Krznarić

=== Former players ===
For details of current and former players, see Category:SKN St. Pölten (women) players.

== Honours ==
- 10 ÖFB-Frauenliga titles: 2014–15, 2015–16, 2016–17, 2017–18, 2018–19, 2020–21, 2021–22, 2022–23, 2023–24, 2024–25
- 11 ÖFB Ladies Cup titles: 2013, 2014, 2015, 2016, 2017, 2018, 2019, 2022, 2023, 2024, 2025
