= SK Sturm Graz (women) =

Austrian women's football club, based in Graz

- Full name: Sportklub Sturm Graz
- Founded: 2011; 15 years ago
- Ground: Messendorf Trainingszentrum, Graz
- Capacity: 1500
- President: Christian Jauk
- Manager: Tode Djaković
- League: ÖFB-Frauenliga
- 2025–26: ÖFB-Frauenliga, 3rd
- Website: https://www.sksturm.at/
Home colours	Away colours

Sportklub Sturm Graz is an Austrian women's football club based in Graz, Styria. The club was founded in 1909 however the women's section has been in existence since 2011. Sturm Graz play in the ÖFB-Frauenliga, the top flight of domestic women's football in Austria and are regular competitors in the UEFA Women's Champions League. The team's colours are black and white.

Sturm Graz plays its home matches at the Messendorf Trainingszentrum, a 1,500-capacity stadium that is situated in Graz.

== History ==
The club was formed in 2011 after taking over FC Stattegg's women's team, despite interest from rivals Grazer AK in also taking over the team. The club started out playing in the 2nd Women's League East, before getting promoted at the end of the 2012–13 into the ÖFB-Frauenliga. After an 8th place finish in their inaugural top-flight season, Sturm Graz went from strength to strength and qualified for the UEFA Women's Champions League after finishing 2nd in the 2015–16 season. They were knocked out of their first Champions League campaign at the Round of 32, losing 0–9 on aggregate to Zürich. Since the 2015–16 season, Sturm Graz have finished as runners-up twice more.

=== Current squad ===
As of 10 July 2026

Note: Flags indicate national team as defined under FIFA eligibility rules; some limited exceptions apply. Players may hold more than one non-FIFA nationality.

No.	Pos.	Nation	Player
1	GK	SLO	Melania Pasar
4	DF	DEN	Laura Lillholm Petersen
5	DF	AUT	Emira Makalić
6	MF	CRO	Mia Gavrić
7	DF	SVK	Lenka Mazúchová
8	MF	AUT	Julia Keutz
10	FW	AUT	Laura Krumböck
11	MF	CRO	Ruzica Krajinović
14	FW	DEN	Sandra Jakobsen
15	MF	AUT	Sophie Maierhofer
16	FW	AUT	Linda Popofsits
—	GK	GER	Sarah-Lisa Dübel

No.	Pos.	Nation	Player
17	MF	AUT	Lena Breznik
18	MF	AUT	Anna Wirnsberger
19	DF	AUT	Stefanie Großgasteiger
21	GK	AUT	Vanessa Gritzner
22	MF	GER	Wassilah Pacaud
23	FW	SLO	Zala Kuštrin
24	DF	CRO	Maria Kunštek
25	DF	GER	Laura Riesenbeck
26	DF	AUT	Leonie Tragl
27	DF	AUT	Elisabeth Brandl
28	MF	AUT	Marie Spiess
—	MF	SRB	Sara Pavlović

==== Out on loan ====
Note: Flags indicate national team as defined under FIFA eligibility rules; some limited exceptions apply. Players may hold more than one non-FIFA nationality.

No.	Pos.	Nation	Player
—	GK	AUT	Kristin Krammer (on loan at Malmö FF until 30 June 2027)

== Honours ==
- ÖFB-Frauenliga
  - Runners-up (5): 2015-16, 2016–17, 2018–19, 2021–22, 2022–23

== Record in UEFA Women's Champions League ==
=== Summary ===
Pld	W	D	L	GF	GA	Last season played
12	4	1	7	19	36	2023–24

=== By season ===
Season	Round	Opponent	Home	Away	Agg
2016–17	Round of 32	(Switzerland) Zürich	0–6	0–3	0–9
2017–18	Qualifying round	(Romania) Noroc Nimoreni	4–0		2nd of 4
2017–18	Qualifying round	(Bulgaria) NSA Sofia	3–1		2nd of 4
2017–18	Qualifying round	(Cyprus) Apollon Limassol	1–4		2nd of 4
2019–20	Qualifying round	(Portugal) Braga	0–2		3rd of 4
2019–20	Qualifying round	(Latvia) Rīgas FS	4–0		3rd of 4
2019–20	Qualifying round	(Cyprus) Apollon Limassol	2–7		3rd of 4
2022–23	Qualifying round 1	(Spain) Real Madrid	0–6		
2022–23	Qualifying round 1	(Kazakhstan) Tomiris-Turan	5–1		
2023–24	Qualifying round 1	(Netherlands) Twente	0–6		
2023–24	Qualifying round 1	(Iceland) Stjarnan	0–0 (a.e.t.) (6–7 p)		
