= UEFA Women's Euro 2013 squads =

List of European football teams

The following is a list of squads for each nation competing at UEFA Women's Euro 2013, an international football tournament held in Sweden from 10 July until 28 July 2013. The 12 national teams involved in the tournament were required to register a squad of 23 players; only players in these squads were eligible to take part in the tournament.

Before announcing their final squad for the tournament, teams were required to name a preliminary squad of 40 players by 10 June 2013, 30 days before the start of the tournament. The preliminary squad would then have to be cut to a final 23, three of which had to be goalkeepers, by 30 June 2013 (midnight CET). Replacement of seriously injured players is permitted until immediately before the team in question's first game, though replacement players must be drawn from the preliminary squad of 40.

The squads were published on 3 July 2013, with Russia being the only national squad made up entirely of players from home-based clubs, while Iceland named the most foreign-based players with 13.

Players marked (c) were named as captain for their national squad.

Number of caps, players' club teams and players' age as of 10 July 2013: the tournament's opening day.

== Group A ==
=== Denmark ===
The squad was announced on 21 June 2013. Goalkeeper Heidi Johansen missed out with a knee injury. Katrine Pedersen, the most capped active player in Europe, was included.

Head coach: Kenneth Heiner-Møller

No.	Pos.	Player	Date of birth (age)	Caps	Goals	Club
1	GK	Stina Lykke Petersen	9 February 1986 (aged 27)	20	0	(Danish Football Association) Brøndby IF
2	DF	Line Røddik Hansen	31 January 1988 (aged 25)	82	10	(Swedish Football Association) Tyresö FF
3	MF	Katrine Pedersen (c)	13 August 1977 (aged 35)	205	9	(Norwegian Football Federation) Stabæk
4	DF	Christina Ørntoft	2 July 1985 (aged 28)	59	1	(Danish Football Association) Brøndby IF
5	DF	Janni Arnth Jensen	15 October 1986 (aged 26)	36	1	(Danish Football Association) Fortuna Hjørring
6	MF	Mariann Gajhede Knudsen	16 November 1984 (aged 28)	88	2	(Swedish Football Association) Linköpings FC
7	FW	Emma Madsen	18 November 1988 (aged 24)	2	0	(Danish Football Association) Brøndby IF
8	MF	Julie Rydahl Bukh	9 January 1982 (aged 31)	86	10	(Danish Football Association) Brøndby IF
9	MF	Nanna Christiansen	17 June 1989 (aged 24)	48	4	(Danish Football Association) Brøndby IF
10	FW	Pernille Harder	15 November 1992 (aged 20)	43	21	(Swedish Football Association) Linköpings FC
11	MF	Katrine Veje	19 June 1991 (aged 22)	49	5	(Swedish Football Association) LdB FC Malmö
12	MF	Line Jensen	23 August 1991 (aged 21)	21	1	(Danish Football Association) Fortuna Hjørring
13	MF	Johanna Rasmussen	2 July 1983 (aged 30)	105	29	(Swedish Football Association) Kristianstads DFF
14	DF	Malene Marquard	2 February 1982 (aged 31)	13	0	(Danish Football Association) Brøndby IF
15	MF	Sofie Junge Pedersen	24 April 1992 (aged 21)	15	2	(Danish Football Association) Fortuna Hjørring
16	GK	Cecilie Sørensen	25 March 1987 (aged 26)	2	0	(Danish Football Association) B93/HIK/Skjold
17	FW	Nadia Nadim	2 January 1988 (aged 25)	36	5	(Danish Football Association) Fortuna Hjørring
18	DF	Theresa Nielsen	20 July 1986 (aged 26)	57	3	(Danish Football Association) Brøndby IF
19	DF	Mia Brogaard	15 October 1981 (aged 31)	68	3	(Danish Football Association) Brøndby IF
20	MF	Sine Hovesen	19 August 1987 (aged 25)	12	1	(Danish Football Association) Fortuna Hjørring
21	DF	Cecilie Sandvej	13 June 1990 (aged 23)	6	0	(Danish Football Association) Brøndby IF
22	GK	Katrine Abel	28 June 1990 (aged 23)	0	0	(Danish Football Association) Taastrup FC
23	MF	Karoline Smidt Nielsen	12 May 1994 (aged 19)	4	0	(Danish Football Association) Fortuna Hjørring

=== Finland ===
A preliminary squad was announced on 3 June 2013, followed by the final selection on 28 June 2013. Striker Linda Sällström and captain Maija Saari both missed out through injury.

Head coach: (Sweden) Andrée Jeglertz

No.	Pos.	Player	Date of birth (age)	Caps	Goals	Club
1	GK	Minna Meriluoto	4 October 1985 (aged 27)	44	0	(Swedish Football Association) Jitex BK
2	DF	Nea-Stina Liljedahl	16 January 1993 (aged 20)	0	0	(Football Association of Finland) FC Honka
3	DF	Tuija Hyyrynen	10 March 1988 (aged 25)	53	0	(Swedish Football Association) Umeå IK
4	DF	Susanna Lehtinen	5 August 1983 (aged 29)	68	3	(Swedish Football Association) KIF Örebro DFF
5	MF	Tiina Saario	15 January 1982 (aged 31)	20	0	(Football Association of Finland) Åland United
6	DF	Laura Kivistö	26 June 1981 (aged 32)	9	0	(Football Association of Finland) PK-35 Vantaa
7	MF	Annika Kukkonen	12 April 1990 (aged 23)	38	1	(Swedish Football Association) Sunnanå SK
8	DF	Katri Nokso-Koivisto	22 November 1982 (aged 30)	76	1	(Norwegian Football Federation) Lillestrøm SK
9	FW	Marianna Tolvanen	27 December 1992 (aged 20)	30	4	(Football Association of Finland) FC Honka
10	MF	Emmi Alanen	30 April 1991 (aged 22)	26	6	(Football Association of Finland) Kokkola F10
11	MF	Nora Heroum	20 July 1994 (aged 18)	12	0	(Football Association of Finland) FC Honka
12	GK	Siiri Välimaa	10 April 1990 (aged 23)	0	0	(Football Association of Finland) NiceFutis
13	MF	Heidi Kivelä	6 November 1988 (aged 24)	3	0	(Football Association of Finland) PK-35 Vantaa
14	FW	Sanna Talonen	15 June 1984 (aged 29)	87	24	(Swedish Football Association) KIF Örebro DFF
15	FW	Leena Puranen	16 October 1986 (aged 26)	55	6	(Swedish Football Association) Jitex BK
16	DF	Anna Westerlund	9 April 1989 (aged 24)	56	0	(Swedish Football Association) Piteå IF
17	FW	Jaana Lyytikäinen	22 October 1982 (aged 30)	32	2	(Football Association of Finland) Åland United
18	MF	Natalia Kuikka	1 December 1995 (aged 17)	2	0	(Football Association of Finland) Merilappi United
19	FW	Henni Malinen	17 November 1988 (aged 24)	0	0	(Football Association of Finland) FC Honka
20	FW	Annica Sjölund	31 March 1985 (aged 28)	62	14	(Swedish Football Association) Jitex BK
21	FW	Ella Vanhanen	15 September 1993 (aged 19)	2	0	(Football Association of Finland) Pallokissat
22	DF	Pirjo Leppikangas	12 September 1987 (aged 25)	2	0	(Football Association of Finland) PK-35 Vantaa
23	GK	Tinja-Riikka Korpela (c)	5 May 1986 (aged 27)	45	0	(Norwegian Football Federation) Lillestrøm SK

=== Italy ===
The squad was announced on 1 July 2013. Elisabetta Tona was injured and replaced by Federica Di Criscio on 9 July 2013.

Head coach: Antonio Cabrini

No.	Pos.	Player	Date of birth (age)	Caps	Goals	Club
1	GK	Sara Penzo	16 December 1989 (aged 23)	7	0	(Italian Football Federation) ACF Brescia
2	DF	Sara Gama	27 March 1989 (aged 24)	68	5	(Italian Football Federation) ACF Brescia
3	DF	Roberta D'Adda	5 October 1981 (aged 31)	71	1	(Italian Football Federation) ACF Brescia
4	MF	Alessia Tuttino	15 March 1983 (aged 30)	117	8	(Italian Football Federation) UPC Tavagnacco
5	DF	Federica Di Criscio	12 May 1993 (aged 20)			(Italian Football Federation) Bardolino Verona
6	DF	Laura Neboli	14 March 1988 (aged 25)	26	0	(German Football Association) FCR 2001 Duisburg
7	MF	Giulia Domenichetti	29 April 1984 (aged 29)	81	6	(Italian Football Federation) ASD Torres Calcio
8	FW	Melania Gabbiadini	28 August 1983 (aged 29)	86	30	(Italian Football Federation) Bardolino Verona
9	FW	Patrizia Panico (c)	8 February 1975 (aged 38)	184	98	(Italian Football Federation) ASD Torres Calcio
10	FW	Cristiana Girelli	23 April 1990 (aged 23)	5	0	(Italian Football Federation) Bardolino Verona
11	MF	Alice Parisi	11 December 1990 (aged 22)	48	8	(Italian Football Federation) UPC Tavagnacco
12	GK	Chiara Marchitelli	4 May 1985 (aged 28)	40	0	(Italian Football Federation) UPC Tavagnacco
13	MF	Elisa Camporese	16 March 1984 (aged 29)	84	23	(Italian Football Federation) UPC Tavagnacco
14	FW	Sandy Iannella	6 April 1987 (aged 26)	22	1	(Italian Football Federation) ASD Torres Calcio
15	FW	Ilaria Mauro	22 May 1988 (aged 25)	8	0	(Italian Football Federation) UPC Tavagnacco
16	DF	Elisa Bartoli	7 May 1991 (aged 22)	0	0	(Italian Football Federation) ASD Torres Calcio
17	MF	Martina Rosucci	9 May 1992 (aged 21)	0	0	(Italian Football Federation) ACF Brescia
18	MF	Daniela Stracchi	2 September 1983 (aged 29)	6	0	(Italian Football Federation) ASD Torres Calcio
19	FW	Paola Brumana	26 November 1982 (aged 30)	6	0	(Italian Football Federation) UPC Tavagnacco
20	DF	Raffaella Manieri	21 November 1986 (aged 26)	31	3	(Italian Football Federation) ASD Torres Calcio
21	DF	Giorgia Motta	18 March 1984 (aged 29)	26	0	(Italian Football Federation) ASD Torres Calcio
22	GK	Katja Schroffenegger	28 April 1991 (aged 22)	4	0	(German Football Association) FF USV Jena
23	DF	Cecilia Salvai	2 December 1993 (aged 19)	1	0	(Swiss Football Association) FC Rapid Lugano

=== Sweden ===
The squad was announced on 25 June 2013.

Head coach: Pia Sundhage

No.	Pos.	Player	Date of birth (age)	Caps	Goals	Club
1	GK	Kristin Hammarström	29 March 1982 (aged 31)	22	0	(Swedish Football Association) Kopparbergs/Göteborg FC
2	DF	Charlotte Rohlin	20 December 1980 (aged 32)	61	6	(Swedish Football Association) Linköpings FC
3	DF	Stina Segerström	17 June 1982 (aged 31)	57	3	(Swedish Football Association) Kopparbergs/Göteborg FC
4	DF	Amanda Ilestedt	17 January 1993 (aged 20)	1	0	(Swedish Football Association) LdB FC Malmö
5	DF	Nilla Fischer	20 August 1984 (aged 28)	102	15	(Swedish Football Association) Linköpings FC
6	DF	Sara Thunebro	26 April 1979 (aged 34)	107	5	(Swedish Football Association) Tyresö FF
7	MF	Lisa Dahlkvist	6 February 1987 (aged 26)	70	9	(Swedish Football Association) Tyresö FF
8	FW	Lotta Schelin (c)	27 February 1984 (aged 29)	121	54	(French Football Federation) Olympique Lyonnais
9	FW	Kosovare Asllani	29 July 1989 (aged 23)	50	11	(French Football Federation) Paris Saint-Germain
10	FW	Sofia Jakobsson	23 April 1990 (aged 23)	31	5	(The Football Association) Chelsea
11	FW	Antonia Göransson	16 September 1990 (aged 22)	36	7	(German Football Association) Turbine Potsdam
12	GK	Hedvig Lindahl	29 April 1983 (aged 30)	91	0	(Swedish Football Association) Kristianstads DFF
13	MF	Emmelie Konradsson	9 April 1989 (aged 24)	7	0	(Swedish Football Association) Umeå IK
14	FW	Josefine Öqvist	23 July 1983 (aged 29)	73	18	(Swedish Football Association) Kristianstads DFF
15	MF	Therese Sjögran	8 April 1977 (aged 36)	183	19	(Swedish Football Association) LdB FC Malmö
16	DF	Lina Nilsson	17 June 1987 (aged 26)	44	0	(Swedish Football Association) LdB FC Malmö
17	MF	Caroline Seger	19 March 1985 (aged 28)	107	14	(Swedish Football Association) Tyresö FF
18	DF	Jessica Samuelsson	30 January 1992 (aged 21)	7	0	(Swedish Football Association) Linköpings FC
19	DF	Elin Magnusson	20 June 1982 (aged 31)	1	0	(Swedish Football Association) KIF Örebro DFF
20	MF	Marie Hammarström	29 March 1982 (aged 31)	35	4	(Swedish Football Association) Kopparbergs/Göteborg FC
21	GK	Sofia Lundgren	20 September 1982 (aged 30)	30	0	(Swedish Football Association) Linköpings FC
22	MF	Olivia Schough	11 March 1991 (aged 22)	5	0	(Swedish Football Association) Kopparbergs/Göteborg FC
23	FW	Jenny Hjohlman	13 February 1990 (aged 23)	1	0	(Swedish Football Association) Umeå IK

== Group B ==
=== Germany ===
The squad was announced on 20 June 2013. Babett Peter, Verena Faißt, Viola Odebrecht, Kim Kulig, Alexandra Popp and Linda Bresonik all withdrew from the provisional squad due to injury or illness.

Head coach: Silvia Neid

No.	Pos.	Player	Date of birth (age)	Caps	Goals	Club
1	GK	Nadine Angerer (c)	10 November 1978 (aged 34)	118	0	(German Football Association) 1. FFC Frankfurt
2	DF	Bianca Schmidt	23 January 1990 (aged 23)	33	2	(German Football Association) 1. FFC Frankfurt
3	DF	Saskia Bartusiak	9 September 1982 (aged 30)	68	0	(German Football Association) 1. FFC Frankfurt
4	DF	Leonie Maier	29 September 1992 (aged 20)	9	2	(German Football Association) SC 07 Bad Neuenahr
5	DF	Annike Krahn	1 July 1985 (aged 28)	88	4	(French Football Federation) Paris Saint-Germain
6	MF	Simone Laudehr	12 July 1986 (aged 26)	59	14	(German Football Association) 1. FFC Frankfurt
7	MF	Melanie Behringer	18 November 1985 (aged 27)	88	24	(German Football Association) 1. FFC Frankfurt
8	MF	Nadine Keßler	4 April 1988 (aged 25)	12	4	(German Football Association) VfL Wolfsburg
9	FW	Lena Lotzen	11 September 1993 (aged 19)	10	0	(German Football Association) FC Bayern Munich
10	FW	Dzsenifer Marozsán	18 April 1992 (aged 21)	18	6	(German Football Association) 1. FFC Frankfurt
11	FW	Anja Mittag	18 April 1985 (aged 28)	91	16	(Swedish Football Association) LdB FC Malmö
12	GK	Almuth Schult	9 February 1991 (aged 22)	11	0	(German Football Association) SC 07 Bad Neuenahr
13	FW	Célia Okoyino da Mbabi	27 June 1988 (aged 25)	79	41	(German Football Association) SC 07 Bad Neuenahr
14	MF	Isabelle Linden	15 January 1991 (aged 22)	1	0	(German Football Association) Bayer Leverkusen
15	DF	Jennifer Cramer	24 February 1993 (aged 20)	5	0	(German Football Association) 1. FFC Turbine Potsdam
16	MF	Melanie Leupolz	14 April 1994 (aged 19)	2	0	(German Football Association) SC Freiburg
17	DF	Josephine Henning	8 September 1989 (aged 23)	14	0	(German Football Association) VfL Wolfsburg
18	MF	Svenja Huth	25 January 1991 (aged 22)	15	0	(German Football Association) 1. FFC Frankfurt
19	MF	Fatmire Bajramaj	1 April 1988 (aged 25)	62	13	(German Football Association) 1. FFC Frankfurt
20	MF	Lena Goeßling	8 March 1986 (aged 27)	50	4	(German Football Association) VfL Wolfsburg
21	GK	Laura Benkarth	14 October 1992 (aged 20)	0	0	(German Football Association) SC Freiburg
22	DF	Luisa Wensing	8 February 1993 (aged 20)	13	0	(German Football Association) VfL Wolfsburg
23	MF	Sara Däbritz	15 February 1995 (aged 18)	1	0	(German Football Association) SC Freiburg

=== Iceland ===
The squad was announced on 24 June 2013. Thirteen of the 23 named players had also been in the squad for UEFA Women's Euro 2009. Sisters Elísa and Margrét Lára Viðarsdóttir were both included. On 4 July Katrín Ásbjörnsdóttir was replaced by Soffía Arnþrúður Gunnarsdóttir.

Head coach: Siggi Eyjólfsson

No.	Pos.	Player	Date of birth (age)	Caps	Goals	Club
1	GK	Þóra Björg Helgadóttir	5 May 1981 (aged 32)	98	0	(Swedish Football Association) LdB FC Malmö
2	DF	Sif Atladóttir	15 July 1985 (aged 27)	47	0	(Swedish Football Association) Kristianstads DFF
3	DF	Ólína Guðbjörg Viðarsdóttir	16 November 1982 (aged 30)	60	2	(Football Association of Iceland) Valur
4	DF	Glódís Perla Viggósdóttir	27 June 1995 (aged 18)	9	0	(Football Association of Iceland) Stjarnan
5	DF	Hallbera Guðný Gísladóttir	14 September 1986 (aged 26)	40	1	(Swedish Football Association) Piteå IF
6	FW	Hólmfríður Magnúsdóttir	20 September 1984 (aged 28)	82	32	(Norwegian Football Federation) Avaldsnes IL
7	MF	Sara Björk Gunnarsdóttir	29 September 1990 (aged 22)	60	14	(Swedish Football Association) LdB FC Malmö
8	DF	Katrín Jónsdóttir (c)	31 July 1977 (aged 35)	128	21	(Swedish Football Association) Umeå IK
9	FW	Margrét Lára Viðarsdóttir	25 July 1986 (aged 26)	88	69	(Swedish Football Association) Kristianstads DFF
10	MF	Dóra María Lárusdóttir	24 July 1985 (aged 27)	90	15	(Football Association of Iceland) Valur
11	MF	Katrín Ómarsdóttir	27 June 1987 (aged 26)	53	9	(The Football Association) Liverpool
12	GK	Sandra Sigurðardóttir	2 October 1986 (aged 26)	6	0	(Football Association of Iceland) Stjarnan
13	GK	Guðbjörg Gunnarsdóttir	10 May 1985 (aged 28)	23	0	(Norwegian Football Federation) Avaldsnes IL
14	MF	Dagný Brynjarsdóttir	10 August 1991 (aged 21)	30	3	(Football Association of Iceland) Valur
15	DF	Anna Björk Kristjánsdóttir	14 October 1989 (aged 23)	0	0	(Football Association of Iceland) Stjarnan
16	FW	Harpa Þorsteinsdóttir	27 June 1986 (aged 27)	29	1	(Football Association of Iceland) Stjarnan
17	DF	Elísa Viðarsdóttir	26 May 1991 (aged 22)	8	0	(Football Association of Iceland) ÍBV
18	MF	Guðný Björk Óðinsdóttir	27 September 1988 (aged 24)	33	0	(Swedish Football Association) Kristianstads DFF
19	FW	Fanndís Friðriksdóttir	9 May 1990 (aged 23)	38	2	(Norwegian Football Federation) Kolbotn IL
20	DF	Þórunn Helga Jónsdóttir	17 December 1984 (aged 28)	9	0	(Norwegian Football Federation) Avaldsnes IL
21	MF	Soffía Arnþrúður Gunnarsdóttir	22 October 1987 (aged 25)	0	0	(Football Association of Iceland) Stjarnan
22	FW	Rakel Hönnudóttir	30 December 1988 (aged 24)	50	3	(Football Association of Iceland) Breiðablik
23	FW	Elín Metta Jensen	1 March 1995 (aged 18)	4	0	(Football Association of Iceland) Valur

=== Netherlands ===
The squad was announced on 30 June 2013. The following day, Mandy van den Berg was ruled out with a knee injury and Merel van Dongen called up as a replacement. Marlous Pieëte left the squad after a knee ligament injury and was replaced by Maayke Heuver.

Head coach: Roger Reijners

No.	Pos.	Player	Date of birth (age)	Caps	Goals	Club
1	GK	Loes Geurts	12 January 1986 (aged 27)	84	0	(Swedish Football Association) Vittsjö GIK
2	DF	Dyanne Bito	10 August 1981 (aged 31)	136	6	(Royal Dutch Football Association) Telstar
3	DF	Daphne Koster (c)	13 March 1981 (aged 32)	133	6	(Royal Dutch Football Association) AFC Ajax
4	DF	Merel van Dongen	11 February 1993 (aged 20)	1	0	(United States Soccer Federation) Alabama Crimson Tide
5	DF	Claudia van den Heiligenberg	25 March 1985 (aged 28)	83	7	(Royal Dutch Football Association) Telstar
6	MF	Anouk Hoogendijk	6 May 1985 (aged 28)	91	8	(Royal Dutch Football Association) AFC Ajax
7	MF	Kirsten van de Ven	11 May 1985 (aged 28)	69	15	(Swedish Football Association) Tyresö FF
8	MF	Sherida Spitse	29 May 1990 (aged 23)	79	12	(Royal Dutch Football Association) FC Twente
9	FW	Manon Melis	31 August 1986 (aged 26)	98	45	(Swedish Football Association) LdB FC Malmö
10	MF	Daniëlle van de Donk	5 August 1991 (aged 21)	18	1	(Royal Dutch Football Association) FCE/PSV
11	FW	Lieke Martens	16 December 1992 (aged 20)	22	7	(German Football Association) FCR 2001 Duisburg
12	MF	Maayke Heuver	26 July 1990 (aged 22)	12	1	(Royal Dutch Football Association) FC Twente
13	FW	Sylvia Smit	4 July 1986 (aged 27)	106	30	(Royal Dutch Football Association) PEC Zwolle
14	MF	Renée Slegers	5 February 1989 (aged 24)	32	5	(Swedish Football Association) Linköpings FC
15	DF	Leonne Stentler	23 April 1986 (aged 27)	17	0	(Royal Dutch Football Association) AFC Ajax
16	GK	Sari van Veenendaal	3 April 1990 (aged 23)	6	0	(Royal Dutch Football Association) FC Twente
17	DF	Siri Worm	20 April 1992 (aged 21)	5	0	(Royal Dutch Football Association) FC Twente
18	MF	Anouk Dekker	15 November 1986 (aged 26)	18	2	(Royal Dutch Football Association) FC Twente
19	FW	Mandy Versteegt	23 February 1990 (aged 23)	3	0	(Royal Dutch Football Association) AFC Ajax
20	MF	Desiree van Lunteren	30 December 1992 (aged 20)	6	1	(Royal Dutch Football Association) AFC Ajax
21	FW	Chantal de Ridder	19 January 1989 (aged 24)	47	11	(Royal Dutch Football Association) AFC Ajax
22	DF	Mirte Roelvink	23 November 1985 (aged 27)	8	0	(German Football Association) FSV Gütersloh 2009
23	GK	Angela Christ	6 March 1989 (aged 24)	11	0	(Royal Dutch Football Association) FCE/PSV

=== Norway ===
The squad was announced on 13 June 2013. Injured forwards Isabell Herlovsen and Cecilie Pedersen were notable absentees.

Head coach: Even Pellerud

No.	Pos.	Player	Date of birth (age)	Caps	Goals	Club
1	GK	Ingrid Hjelmseth	10 April 1980 (aged 33)	67	0	(Norwegian Football Federation) Stabæk
2	DF	Marita Skammelsrud Lund	29 January 1989 (aged 24)	43	2	(Norwegian Football Federation) LSK Kvinner FK
3	DF	Marit Fiane Christensen	11 December 1980 (aged 32)	81	10	(Norwegian Football Federation) Amazon Grimstad
4	MF	Ingvild Stensland (c)	3 August 1981 (aged 31)	123	8	(Norwegian Football Federation) Stabæk
5	DF	Toril Hetland Akerhaugen	5 March 1982 (aged 31)	50	0	(Norwegian Football Federation) Stabæk
6	DF	Maren Mjelde	6 November 1989 (aged 23)	55	5	(German Football Association) Turbine Potsdam
7	MF	Trine Bjerke Rønning	14 June 1982 (aged 31)	132	20	(Norwegian Football Federation) Stabæk
8	MF	Solveig Gulbrandsen	12 January 1981 (aged 32)	163	47	(Norwegian Football Federation) Vålerenga
9	FW	Elise Thorsnes	14 August 1988 (aged 24)	60	11	(Norwegian Football Federation) Stabæk
10	FW	Caroline Graham Hansen	18 February 1995 (aged 18)	16	4	(Norwegian Football Federation) Stabæk
11	FW	Leni Larsen Kaurin	21 March 1981 (aged 32)	96	5	(Norwegian Football Federation) Stabæk
12	GK	Silje Vesterbekkmo	22 June 1983 (aged 30)	3	0	(Norwegian Football Federation) Røa IL
13	FW	Melissa Bjånesøy	18 April 1992 (aged 21)	7	1	(Norwegian Football Federation) IL Sandviken
14	MF	Gry Tofte Ims	2 March 1986 (aged 27)	30	3	(Norwegian Football Federation) Klepp
15	DF	Nora Holstad Berge	26 March 1987 (aged 26)	26	0	(Norwegian Football Federation) Arna-Bjørnar
16	DF	Kristine Wigdahl Hegland	8 August 1992 (aged 20)	20	1	(Norwegian Football Federation) Arna-Bjørnar
17	FW	Lene Mykjåland	20 February 1987 (aged 26)	54	9	(Norwegian Football Federation) LSK Kvinner FK
18	MF	Ingrid Ryland	29 May 1989 (aged 24)	18	0	(Norwegian Football Federation) Arna-Bjørnar
19	MF	Ingvild Isaksen	10 February 1989 (aged 24)	29	0	(Norwegian Football Federation) Kolbotn
20	FW	Emilie Haavi	16 June 1992 (aged 21)	21	5	(Norwegian Football Federation) LSK Kvinner FK
21	FW	Ada Hegerberg	10 July 1995 (aged 18)	9	4	(German Football Association) Turbine Potsdam
22	MF	Cathrine Dekkerhus	17 September 1992 (aged 20)	5	0	(Norwegian Football Federation) Stabæk
23	GK	Nora Neset Gjøen	20 February 1992 (aged 21)	2	0	(Norwegian Football Federation) Kolbotn

== Group C ==
=== England ===
The squad was announced on 17 June 2013.

Head coach: Hope Powell

No.	Pos.	Player	Date of birth (age)	Caps	Goals	Club
1	GK	Karen Bardsley	27 October 1984 (aged 28)	29	0	(The Football Association) Lincoln Ladies
2	DF	Alex Scott	14 October 1984 (aged 28)	98	12	(The Football Association) Arsenal
3	DF	Steph Houghton	23 April 1988 (aged 25)	35	6	(The Football Association) Arsenal
4	MF	Jill Scott	2 February 1987 (aged 26)	67	12	(The Football Association) Everton
5	DF	Sophie Bradley	21 October 1989 (aged 23)	23	0	(The Football Association) Lincoln Ladies
6	DF	Casey Stoney (c)	13 May 1982 (aged 31)	110	5	(The Football Association) Lincoln Ladies
7	FW	Eniola Aluko	21 February 1987 (aged 26)	70	14	(The Football Association) Chelsea
8	MF	Anita Asante	27 April 1985 (aged 28)	64	1	(Swedish Football Association) Kopparbergs/Göteborg FC
9	FW	Ellen White	9 May 1989 (aged 24)	37	14	(The Football Association) Arsenal
10	MF	Fara Williams	25 January 1984 (aged 29)	114	36	(The Football Association) Liverpool
11	MF	Rachel Yankey	1 November 1979 (aged 33)	127	19	(The Football Association) Arsenal
12	MF	Jessica Clarke	5 May 1989 (aged 24)	39	10	(The Football Association) Lincoln Ladies
13	GK	Rachel Brown	18 July 1980 (aged 32)	81	0	(The Football Association) Everton
14	MF	Karen Carney	1 August 1987 (aged 25)	82	13	(The Football Association) Birmingham City
15	DF	Laura Bassett	2 August 1983 (aged 29)	31	0	(The Football Association) Birmingham City
16	MF	Jordan Nobbs	8 December 1992 (aged 20)	6	1	(The Football Association) Arsenal
17	FW	Toni Duggan	25 July 1991 (aged 21)	8	2	(The Football Association) Everton
18	DF	Dunia Susi	11 August 1987 (aged 25)	21	0	(The Football Association) Chelsea
19	DF	Gemma Bonner	13 July 1991 (aged 21)	0	0	(The Football Association) Liverpool
20	MF	Jade Moore	22 October 1990 (aged 22)	5	1	(The Football Association) Birmingham City
21	DF	Lucy Bronze	28 October 1991 (aged 21)	1	0	(The Football Association) Liverpool
22	FW	Kelly Smith	29 October 1978 (aged 34)	113	46	(The Football Association) Arsenal
23	GK	Siobhan Chamberlain	15 August 1983 (aged 29)	25	0	(The Football Association) Bristol Academy

=== France ===
The squad was announced on 31 May 2013. Laëtitia Tonazzi withdrew from the squad on 19 June 2013.

Head coach: Bruno Bini

No.	Pos.	Player	Date of birth (age)	Caps	Goals	Club
1	GK	Céline Deville	24 January 1982 (aged 31)	58	0	(French Football Federation) Olympique Lyon
2	DF	Wendie Renard	20 July 1990 (aged 22)	36	6	(French Football Federation) Olympique Lyon
3	DF	Laure Boulleau	22 October 1986 (aged 26)	39	0	(French Football Federation) Paris Saint-Germain
4	DF	Laura Georges	20 August 1984 (aged 28)	136	5	(French Football Federation) Olympique Lyon
5	DF	Ophélie Meilleroux	18 January 1984 (aged 29)	67	0	(French Football Federation) Montpellier HSC
6	MF	Sandrine Soubeyrand (c)	16 August 1973 (aged 39)	194	17	(French Football Federation) FCF Juvisy
7	DF	Corine Franco	5 October 1983 (aged 29)	81	11	(French Football Federation) Olympique Lyon
8	MF	Élise Bussaglia	24 September 1985 (aged 27)	111	20	(French Football Federation) Olympique Lyon
9	FW	Eugénie Le Sommer	18 May 1989 (aged 24)	74	26	(French Football Federation) Olympique Lyon
10	MF	Amandine Henry	28 September 1989 (aged 23)	13	1	(French Football Federation) Olympique Lyon
11	DF	Julie Soyer	30 June 1985 (aged 28)	6	0	(French Football Federation) FCF Juvisy
12	FW	Élodie Thomis	13 August 1986 (aged 26)	90	27	(French Football Federation) Olympique Lyon
13	MF	Camille Catala	6 May 1991 (aged 22)	18	2	(French Football Federation) FCF Juvisy
14	MF	Louisa Nécib	23 January 1987 (aged 26)	97	20	(French Football Federation) Olympique Lyon
15	DF	Jessica Houara	29 September 1987 (aged 25)	7	0	(French Football Federation) Paris Saint-Germain
16	GK	Sarah Bouhaddi	17 October 1986 (aged 26)	67	0	(French Football Federation) Olympique Lyon
17	MF	Gaëtane Thiney	28 October 1985 (aged 27)	88	35	(French Football Federation) FCF Juvisy
18	FW	Marie-Laure Delie	29 January 1988 (aged 25)	59	45	(French Football Federation) Montpellier HSC
19	FW	Sandrine Brétigny	2 July 1984 (aged 29)	22	9	(German Football Association) 1. FFC Frankfurt
20	FW	Viviane Asseyi	20 November 1993 (aged 19)	1	0	(French Football Federation) Montpellier HSC
21	GK	Karima Benameur	19 July 1989 (aged 23)	2	0	(French Football Federation) Paris Saint-Germain
22	DF	Sabrina Delannoy	18 May 1986 (aged 27)	5	0	(French Football Federation) Paris Saint-Germain
23	MF	Camille Abily	5 December 1984 (aged 28)	116	23	(French Football Federation) Olympique Lyon

=== Russia ===
The squad was announced on 1 July 2013.

Head coach: Sergei Lavrentyev

No.	Pos.	Player	Date of birth (age)	Caps	Goals	Club
1	GK	Elvira Todua	31 January 1986 (aged 27)	69	0	(Russian Football Union) WFC Rossiyanka
2	DF	Yulia Gordeeva	5 January 1988 (aged 25)	5	0	(Russian Football Union) Izmailovo Moscow
3	MF	Ekaterina Stepanenko	21 May 1983 (aged 30)	8	0	(Russian Football Union) Izmailovo Moscow
4	MF	Maria Dyatchkova	26 May 1982 (aged 31)	27	0	(Russian Football Union) Zvezda 2005 Perm
5	MF	Olga Petrova	9 July 1986 (aged 27)	52	8	(Russian Football Union) WFC Rossiyanka
6	MF	Yulia Bessolova	23 August 1992 (aged 20)	0	0	(Russian Football Union) Izmailovo Moscow
7	FW	Olesya Kurochkina	6 September 1983 (aged 29)	50	19	(Russian Football Union) Izmailovo Moscow
8	MF	Valentina Savchenkova	29 April 1983 (aged 30)	55	7	(Russian Football Union) Ryazan VDV
9	MF	Anastasia Pozdeeva	12 June 1993 (aged 20)	3	0	(Russian Football Union) Zvezda 2005 Perm
10	MF	Elena Terekhova	5 July 1987 (aged 26)	45	4	(Russian Football Union) Ryazan VDV
11	FW	Ekaterina Sochneva	12 August 1985 (aged 27)	51	18	(Russian Football Union) Zorky Krasnogorsk
12	GK	Yulia Grichenko	10 March 1990 (aged 23)	3	0	(Russian Football Union) Kubanochka Krasnodar
13	MF	Alla Sidorovskaya	27 July 1983 (aged 29)	9	0	(Russian Football Union) Izmailovo Moscow
14	MF	Tatyana Skotnikova	27 November 1978 (aged 34)	88	9	(Russian Football Union) WFC Rossiyanka
15	DF	Anastasia Kostyukova	15 May 1985 (aged 28)	20	2	(Russian Football Union) Zorky Krasnogorsk
16	DF	Natalia Pertseva	4 June 1984 (aged 29)	47	1	(Russian Football Union) WFC Rossiyanka
17	FW	Natalia Shlyapina	12 July 1983 (aged 29)	54	23	(Russian Football Union) WFC Rossiyanka
18	DF	Elena Medved	23 January 1985 (aged 28)	24	1	(Russian Football Union) Zorky Krasnogorsk
19	DF	Ksenia Tsybutovich (c)	26 June 1987 (aged 26)	53	1	(Russian Football Union) Ryazan VDV
20	FW	Nelli Korovkina	1 November 1989 (aged 23)	8	3	(Russian Football Union) Izmailovo Moscow
21	GK	Margarita Shirokova	14 January 1992 (aged 21)	1	0	(Russian Football Union) WFC Rossiyanka
22	DF	Daria Makarenko	7 March 1992 (aged 21)	16	0	(Russian Football Union) Zvezda 2005 Perm
23	MF	Elena Morozova	15 March 1987 (aged 26)	58	12	(Russian Football Union) Zorky Krasnogorsk

=== Spain ===
The squad was announced on 29 June 2013.

Head coach: Ignacio Quereda

No.	Pos.	Player	Date of birth (age)	Caps	Goals	Club
1	GK	Ainhoa Tirapu	4 September 1984 (aged 28)	29	0	(Royal Spanish Football Federation) Athletic Club
2	MF	Virginia Torrecilla	4 September 1991 (aged 21)	1	0	(Royal Spanish Football Federation) FC Barcelona
3	DF	Leire Landa	19 December 1986 (aged 26)	8	0	(Royal Spanish Football Federation) Athletic Club
4	DF	Melisa Nicolau	20 June 1985 (aged 28)	31	0	(Royal Spanish Football Federation) FC Barcelona
5	DF	Ruth García	26 April 1987 (aged 26)	28	2	(Royal Spanish Football Federation) Levante UD
6	DF	Miriam Diéguez	4 May 1986 (aged 27)	25	0	(Royal Spanish Football Federation) FC Barcelona
7	FW	Priscila Borja	28 April 1985 (aged 28)	11	5	(Royal Spanish Football Federation) Atlético Madrid
8	FW	Sonia Bermúdez	18 November 1984 (aged 28)	29	14	(Royal Spanish Football Federation) FC Barcelona
9	FW	Verónica Boquete (c)	9 April 1987 (aged 26)	29	22	(Swedish Football Association) Tyresö FF
10	FW	Adriana Martín	27 November 1986 (aged 26)	32	26	(United States Soccer Federation) Western New York Flash
11	MF	Sandra Vilanova	1 January 1981 (aged 32)	45	2	(Royal Spanish Football Federation) RCD Espanyol
12	MF	Alexia Putellas	4 February 1994 (aged 19)	4	1	(Royal Spanish Football Federation) FC Barcelona
13	GK	Dolores Gallardo	10 June 1993 (aged 20)	2	0	(Royal Spanish Football Federation) Atlético Madrid
14	MF	Victoria Losada	5 March 1991 (aged 22)	7	0	(Royal Spanish Football Federation) FC Barcelona
15	MF	Silvia Meseguer	12 March 1989 (aged 24)	26	4	(Royal Spanish Football Federation) RCD Espanyol
16	MF	Nagore Calderón	2 June 1993 (aged 20)	4	0	(Royal Spanish Football Federation) Atlético Madrid
17	MF	Elixabet Ibarra	29 June 1981 (aged 32)	29	2	(Royal Spanish Football Federation) Athletic Club
18	DF	Marta Torrejón	27 February 1990 (aged 23)	28	4	(Royal Spanish Football Federation) RCD Espanyol
19	FW	Erika Vázquez	6 February 1983 (aged 30)	38	7	(Royal Spanish Football Federation) Athletic Club
20	DF	Irene Paredes	4 July 1991 (aged 22)	7	0	(Royal Spanish Football Federation) Athletic Club
21	MF	Jennifer Hermoso	9 May 1990 (aged 23)	7	1	(Swedish Football Association) Tyresö FF
22	MF	Amanda Sampedro	26 June 1993 (aged 20)	0	0	(Royal Spanish Football Federation) Atlético Madrid
23	GK	María José Pons	8 August 1984 (aged 28)	5	0	(Royal Spanish Football Federation) RCD Espanyol
