= UEFA Women's Euro 2013 Group A =

Football tournament group stage

Group A of the UEFA Women's Euro 2013 consisted of Denmark, Finland, Italy and the host nation Sweden. Matches were staged in Gothenburg and Halmstad from 10–16 July 2013.

Sweden won the group and advanced to the knockout stage along with group runners-up Italy. Denmark progressed as one of the best third-placed teams, but only after a drawing of lots. Finland finished bottom of the group and so were also eliminated from the tournament.

== Standings ==
Pos	Team	Pld	W	D	L	GF	GA	GD	Pts	Qualification
1	Sweden (H)	3	2	1	0	9	2	+7	7	Advance to knockout stage
2	Italy	3	1	1	1	3	4	−1	4	Advance to knockout stage
3	Denmark	3	0	2	1	3	4	−1	2	Advance to knockout stage
4	Finland	3	0	2	1	1	6	−5	2	

Source: UEFA.com
(H) Hosts

== Italy vs Finland ==
10 July 2013
18:00

Italy	0–0	Finland
	Report

Örjans Vall, Halmstad
Attendance: 3,011
Referee: Teodora Albon (Romania)

Italy	Finland

ITALY:
GK	12	Chiara Marchitelli
RB	16	Elisa Bartoli
CB	23	Cecilia Salvai
CB	3	Roberta D'Adda
LB	20	Raffaella Manieri
RM	4	Alessia Tuttino
CM	18	Daniela Stracchi
LM	11	Alice Parisi
RF	8	Melania Gabbiadini
CF	9	Patrizia Panico (c)
LF	13	Elisa Camporese	(yellow card) 24'	(substituted off) 70'
Substitutions:
FW	14	Sandy Iannella		(substituted in) 70'
Manager:
Antonio Cabrini

FINLAND:
GK	23	Tinja-Riikka Korpela (c)
RB	3	Tuija Hyyrynen
CB	16	Anna Westerlund	(yellow card) 47'
CB	6	Laura Kivistö
LB	4	Susanna Lehtinen
CM	11	Nora Heroum
CM	7	Annika Kukkonen
RW	9	Marianna Tolvanen		(substituted off) 74'
LW	10	Emmi Alanen	(yellow card) 45+1'
SS	20	Annica Sjölund		(substituted off) 61'
CF	14	Sanna Talonen
Substitutions:
FW	17	Jaana Lyytikäinen	(yellow card) 62'	(substituted in) 61'
MF	18	Natalia Kuikka		(substituted in) 74'
Manager:
(Sweden) Andrée Jeglertz

Player of the Match:
Anna Westerlund (Finland)

Assistant referees:
Petruţa Iugulescu (Romania)
Lucie Ratajová (Czech Republic)
Fourth official:
Monika Mularczyk (Poland)

== Sweden vs Denmark ==
10 July 2013
20:30

Sweden	1–1	Denmark
Fischer 36'	Report	Gajhede Knudsen 26'

Gamla Ullevi, Gothenburg
Attendance: 16,128
Referee: Bibiana Steinhaus (Germany)

Sweden	Denmark

SWEDEN:
GK	1	Kristin Hammarström
RB	18	Jessica Samuelsson
CB	5	Nilla Fischer
CB	2	Charlotte Rohlin
LB	6	Sara Thunebro
RM	14	Josefine Öqvist	(substituted off) 79'
CM	20	Marie Hammarström
CM	17	Caroline Seger
LM	11	Antonia Göransson	(substituted off) 63'
CF	9	Kosovare Asllani
CF	8	Lotta Schelin (c)
Substitutions:
MF	7	Lisa Dahlkvist	(substituted in) 63'
FW	10	Sofia Jakobsson	(substituted in) 79'
Manager:
Pia Sundhage

DENMARK:
GK	1	Stina Lykke Petersen
RB	18	Theresa Nielsen	(yellow card) 84'
CB	4	Christina Ørntoft	(yellow card) 66'
CB	2	Line Røddik Hansen
LB	19	Mia Brogaard
RM	6	Mariann Gajhede Knudsen
CM	3	Katrine Pedersen (c)
LM	15	Sofie Junge Pedersen		(substituted off) 46'
RF	11	Katrine Veje		(substituted off) 62'
CF	10	Pernille Harder
LF	13	Johanna Rasmussen		(substituted off) 89'
Substitutions:
FW	17	Nadia Nadim		(substituted in) 46'
MF	8	Julie Rydahl Bukh		(substituted in) 62'
MF	12	Line Jensen		(substituted in) 89'
Manager:
Kenneth Heiner-Møller

Player of the Match:
Stina Lykke Petersen (Denmark)

Assistant referees:
Marina Wozniak (Germany)
Maria Villa Gutiérrez (Spain)
Fourth official:
Esther Azzopardi (Malta)

== Italy vs Denmark ==
13 July 2013
18:00

Italy	2–1	Denmark
Gabbiadini 55'; Mauro 60'	Report	Brogaard 66'

Örjans Vall, Halmstad
Attendance: 2,190
Referee: Esther Staubli (Switzerland)

Italy	Denmark

ITALY:
GK	12	Chiara Marchitelli
RB	16	Elisa Bartoli	(yellow card) 45+1'
CB	23	Cecilia Salvai
CB	3	Roberta D'Adda
LB	20	Raffaella Manieri	(yellow card) 88'
DM	18	Daniela Stracchi
CM	4	Alessia Tuttino	(yellow card) 85'
CM	11	Alice Parisi		(substituted off) 58'
RW	8	Melania Gabbiadini
LW	14	Sandy Iannella		(substituted off) 85'
CF	9	Patrizia Panico (c)		(substituted off) 72'
Substitutions:
FW	15	Ilaria Mauro		(substituted in) 58'
MF	17	Martina Rosucci		(substituted in) 72'
MF	7	Giulia Domenichetti		(substituted in) 85'
Manager:
Antonio Cabrini

DENMARK:
GK	1	Stina Lykke Petersen
RB	18	Theresa Nielsen	(substituted off) 86'
CB	4	Christina Ørntoft
CB	2	Line Røddik Hansen
LB	19	Mia Brogaard
DM	6	Mariann Gajhede Knudsen
CM	3	Katrine Pedersen (c)
CM	15	Sofie Junge Pedersen	(substituted off) 46'
RF	13	Johanna Rasmussen
CF	10	Pernille Harder
LF	11	Katrine Veje	(substituted off) 65'
Substitutions:
FW	17	Nadia Nadim	(substituted in) 46'
MF	8	Julie Rydahl Bukh	(substituted in) 65'
MF	7	Emma Madsen	(substituted in) 86'
Manager:
Kenneth Heiner-Møller

Player of the Match:
Melania Gabbiadini (Italy)

Assistant referees:
Sian Massey (England)
Lucie Ratajová (Czech Republic)
Fourth official:
Katalin Kulcsár (Hungary)

== Finland vs Sweden ==
13 July 2013
20:30

Finland	0–5	Sweden
	Report	Fischer 15', 36'; Asllani 38'; Schelin 60', 87'

Gamla Ullevi, Gothenburg
Attendance: 16,414
Referee: Cristina Dorcioman (Romania)

Finland	Sweden

FINLAND:
GK	23	Tinja-Riikka Korpela (c)
RB	3	Tuija Hyyrynen
CB	16	Anna Westerlund
CB	6	Laura Kivistö
LB	4	Susanna Lehtinen
DM	7	Annika Kukkonen
RM	9	Marianna Tolvanen	(substituted off) 31'
CM	11	Nora Heroum
CM	17	Jaana Lyytikäinen	(substituted off) 87'
LM	10	Emmi Alanen
CF	14	Sanna Talonen	(substituted off) 69'
Substitutions:
MF	5	Tiina Saario	(substituted in) 31'
FW	21	Ella Vanhanen	(substituted in) 69'
MF	18	Natalia Kuikka	(substituted in) 87'
Manager:
(Sweden) Andrée Jeglertz

SWEDEN:
GK	1	Kristin Hammarström
RB	16	Lina Nilsson
CB	5	Nilla Fischer
CB	2	Charlotte Rohlin
LB	6	Sara Thunebro
CM	17	Caroline Seger (c)
CM	20	Marie Hammarström	(substituted off) 57'
RW	14	Josefine Öqvist	(substituted off) 67'
LW	10	Sofia Jakobsson
CF	9	Kosovare Asllani	(substituted off) 72'
CF	8	Lotta Schelin
Substitutions:
MF	7	Lisa Dahlkvist	(substituted in) 57'
FW	11	Antonia Göransson	(substituted in) 67'
FW	23	Jenny Hjohlman	(substituted in) 72'
Manager:
Pia Sundhage

Player of the Match:
Nilla Fischer (Sweden)

Assistant referees:
Maria Lisická (Slovakia)
Maria Villa Gutiérrez (Spain)
Fourth official:
Carina Vitulano (Italy)

== Sweden vs Italy ==
16 July 2013
20:30

Sweden	3–1	Italy
Manieri 47' (o.g.); Schelin 49'; Öqvist 57'	Report	Gabbiadini 78'

Örjans Vall, Halmstad
Attendance: 7,288
Referee: Katalin Kulcsár (Hungary)

Sweden	Italy

SWEDEN:
GK	1	Kristin Hammarström
RB	18	Jessica Samuelsson
CB	5	Nilla Fischer	(yellow card) 90+1'
CB	2	Charlotte Rohlin
LB	6	Sara Thunebro		(substituted off) 79'
CM	17	Caroline Seger		(substituted off) 64'
CM	7	Lisa Dahlkvist
RW	14	Josefine Öqvist
LW	20	Marie Hammarström
CF	9	Kosovare Asllani		(substituted off) 46'
CF	8	Lotta Schelin (c)
Substitutions:
MF	15	Therese Sjögran		(substituted in) 46'
DF	16	Lina Nilsson		(substituted in) 64'
MF	22	Olivia Schough		(substituted in) 79'
Manager:
Pia Sundhage

ITALY:
GK	12	Chiara Marchitelli
RB	2	Sara Gama
CB	3	Roberta D'Adda (c)
CB	20	Raffaella Manieri
LB	21	Giorgia Motta	(yellow card) 35'
CM	17	Martina Rosucci	(yellow card) 60'
CM	11	Alice Parisi
RW	19	Paola Brumana		(substituted off) 63'
LW	14	Sandy Iannella
CF	10	Cristiana Girelli		(substituted off) 52'
CF	15	Ilaria Mauro		(substituted off) 63'
Substitutions:
MF	7	Giulia Domenichetti		(substituted in) 52'
FW	8	Melania Gabbiadini		(substituted in) 63'
FW	9	Patrizia Panico		(substituted in) 63'
Manager:
Antonio Cabrini

Player of the Match:
Lotta Schelin (Sweden)

Assistant referees:
Judit Kulcsár (Hungary)
Sian Massey (England)
Fourth official:
Monika Mularczyk (Poland)

== Denmark vs Finland ==
16 July 2013
20:30

Denmark	1–1	Finland
Brogaard 29'	Report	Sjölund 87'

Gamla Ullevi, Gothenburg
Attendance: 8,360
Referee: Kateryna Monzul (Ukraine)

Denmark	Finland

DENMARK:
GK	1	Stina Lykke Petersen
RB	18	Theresa Nielsen
CB	4	Christina Ørntoft
CB	2	Line Røddik Hansen
LB	21	Cecilie Sandvej	(yellow card) 52'
RM	3	Katrine Pedersen (c)
CM	6	Mariann Gajhede Knudsen
LM	19	Mia Brogaard
RF	17	Nadia Nadim		(substituted off) 64'
CF	10	Pernille Harder		(substituted off) 85'
LF	8	Julie Rydahl Bukh		(substituted off) 64'
Substitutions:
MF	9	Nanna Christiansen		(substituted in) 64'
MF	13	Johanna Rasmussen		(substituted in) 64'
MF	23	Karoline Smidt Nielsen		(substituted in) 85'
Manager:
Kenneth Heiner-Møller

FINLAND:
GK	1	Minna Meriluoto
RB	3	Tuija Hyyrynen
CB	16	Anna Westerlund
CB	6	Laura Kivistö		(substituted off) 79'
LB	4	Susanna Lehtinen		(substituted off) 46'
DM	5	Tiina Saario
DM	7	Annika Kukkonen	(yellow card) 90'
CM	10	Emmi Alanen
RW	11	Nora Heroum		(substituted off) 69'
LW	8	Katri Nokso-Koivisto
CF	20	Annica Sjölund (c)
Substitutions:
MF	18	Natalia Kuikka		(substituted in) 46'
FW	14	Sanna Talonen		(substituted in) 69'
MF	13	Heidi Kivelä		(substituted in) 79'
Manager:
(Sweden) Andrée Jeglertz

Player of the Match:
Katrine Pedersen (Denmark)

Assistant referees:
Natalia Rachynska (Ukraine)
Maria Villa Gutiérrez (Spain)
Fourth official:
Esther Azzopardi (Malta)
