= UEFA Women's Euro 2013 statistics =

These are the statistics for the UEFA Women's Euro 2013, which took place in Sweden.

== Goalscorers ==
5 goals

- (Sweden) Lotta Schelin

3 goals

- (Sweden) Nilla Fischer

2 goals

- (Denmark) Mia Brogaard
- (Denmark) Mariann Gajhede Knudsen
- (France) Marie-Laure Delie
- (France) Eugénie Le Sommer
- (France) Louisa Nécib
- (France) Wendie Renard
- (Germany) Célia Okoyino da Mbabi
- (Italy) Melania Gabbiadini
- (Norway) Solveig Gulbrandsen
- (Spain) Verónica Boquete
- (Spain) Jennifer Hermoso
- (Sweden) Josefine Öqvist

1 goal

- (Denmark) Johanna Rasmussen
- (England) Eniola Aluko
- (England) Laura Bassett
- (England) Toni Duggan
- (Finland) Annica Sjölund
- (Germany) Simone Laudehr
- (Germany) Lena Lotzen
- (Germany) Dzsenifer Marozsán
- (Germany) Anja Mittag
- (Iceland) Dagný Brynjarsdóttir
- (Iceland) Margrét Lára Viðarsdóttir
- (Italy) Ilaria Mauro
- (Norway) Marit Fiane Christensen
- (Norway) Ada Hegerberg
- (Norway) Kristine Wigdahl Hegland
- (Norway) Ingvild Isaksen
- (Russia) Nelli Korovkina
- (Russia) Elena Morozova
- (Russia) Elena Terekhova
- (Spain) Alexia Putellas
- (Sweden) Kosovare Asllani
- (Sweden) Marie Hammarström

Own goal

- (Italy) Raffaella Manieri (playing against Sweden)
- (Spain) Irene Paredes (playing against Norway)

== Assists ==
4 assists

- (Sweden) Kosovare Asllani

2 assists

- (France) Eugénie Le Sommer
- (France) Louisa Nécib
- (Spain) Adriana Martín
- (Sweden) Lotta Schelin
- (Sweden) Sara Thunebro

1 assist

- (Denmark) Julie Rydahl Bukh
- (Denmark) Katrine Pedersen
- (England) Anita Asante
- (England) Jill Scott
- (Finland) Annika Kukkonen
- (France) Élodie Thomis
- (Germany) Fatmire Bajramaj
- (Germany) Leonie Maier
- (Germany) Dzsenifer Marozsán
- (Germany) Anja Mittag
- (Germany) Célia Okoyino da Mbabi
- (Iceland) Hallbera Guðný Gísladóttir
- (Italy) Raffaella Manieri
- (Italy) Patrizia Panico
- (Norway) Kristine Hegland
- (Norway) Ingrid Hjelmseth
- (Norway) Ingvild Stensland
- (Russia) Nelli Korovkina
- (Russia) Elena Terekhova
- (Spain) Sonia Bermúdez
- (Spain) Verónica Boquete
- (Sweden) Lisa Dahlkvist
- (Sweden) Marie Hammarström
- (Sweden) Sofia Jakobsson
- (Sweden) Therese Sjögran

== Scoring ==
- Total number of matches played: 25
- Total number of goals scored: 56
- Average goals per match: 2.24
- Total number of braces: 4 – Lotta Schelin for Sweden against Finland and Iceland, Delie for France against Russia, Okoyino da Mbabi for Germany against Iceland
- Total number of hat-tricks: 0
- Total number of penalty kicks awarded: 6
- Total number of penalty kicks scored: 2 – Margrét Lára Viðarsdóttir for Iceland against Norway, Louisa Nécib for France against Denmark
- Total number of penalty kicks missed: 4 – Lotta Schelin for Sweden against Denmark, Kosovare Asllani for Sweden against Denmark, Trine Rønning for Norway against Germany, Solveig Gulbrandsen for Norway against Germany
- Most goals scored by a team: 13 – Sweden
- Most goals scored by an individual: 5 – Lotta Schelin
- Most assists given by an individual: 4 – Kosovare Asllani
- Fewest goals scored by a team: 0 – Netherlands
- Fastest goal in a match from kickoff: 3rd minute – Marie Hammarström for Sweden against Iceland, Marit Fiane Christensen for Norway against Denmark
- Latest goal in a match without extra time: 90+3rd minute – Alexia Putellas for Spain against England, Jennifer Hermoso for Spain against Norway

== Stadiums ==
- Overall attendance: 216,888
- Average attendance per match: 8,676
- Highest attendance: 41,301 – Germany (1–0) Norway
- Lowest attendance: 2,157 – Russia (1–1) Spain

Stadium	City	Capacity	Matches played	Total attendance	Average attendance per match	Average attendance as % of capacity
Arena Linköping	Linköping	7,300	4	23,599	5,900	80.82%
Friends Arena	Solna	50,000	1	41,301	41,301	82.60%
Gamla Ullevi	Gothenburg	16,600	4	57,510	14,378	86.61%
Guldfågeln Arena	Kalmar	10,900	4	28,904	7,226	66.29%
Myresjöhus Arena	Växjö	10,000	4	26,152	6,538	72.26%
Nya Parken	Norrköping	10,500	4	19,465	4,866	46.35%
Örjans Vall	Halmstad	7,500	4	19957	4,989	64.88%

== Discipline ==
- Total number of yellow cards: 48
- Average number of yellow cards per game: 1.92
- Total number of red cards: 0
- Average number of red cards per game: 0
- Most fouls committed: 10 – Sara Björk Gunnarsdóttir

=== Yellow cards ===
2 yellow cards

- (England) Fara Williams
- (Germany) Jennifer Cramer
- (Iceland) Hólmfríður Magnúsdóttir
- (Italy) Alessia Tuttino
- (Sweden) Nilla Fischer

1 yellow card

- (Denmark) Janni Arnth Jensen
- (Denmark) Theresa Nielsen
- (Denmark) Cecilie Sandvej
- (Denmark) Christina Ørntoft
- (England) Laura Bassett
- (Finland) Emmi Alanen
- (Finland) Annika Kukkonen
- (Finland) Jaana Lyytikäinen
- (Finland) Anna Westerlund
- (France) Wendie Renard
- (Germany) Nadine Keßler
- (Germany) Annike Krahn
- (Germany) Simone Laudehr
- (Germany) Leonie Maier
- (Iceland) Fanndís Friðriksdóttir
- (Iceland) Katrín Jónsdóttir
- (Italy) Elisa Bartoli
- (Italy) Elisa Camporese
- (Italy) Federica Di Criscio
- (Italy) Raffaella Manieri
- (Italy) Giorgia Motta
- (Italy) Alice Parisi
- (Italy) Martina Rosucci
- (Italy) Cecilia Salvai
- (Italy) Daniela Stracchi
- (Netherlands) Dyanne Bito
- (Netherlands) Daphne Koster
- (Netherlands) Renée Slegers
- (Norway) Marit Fiane Christensen
- (Norway) Ingrid Hjelmseth
- (Norway) Ingvild Stensland
- (Norway) Gry Tofte Ims
- (Russia) Nelli Korovkina
- (Russia) Anastasia Kostyukova
- (Russia) Elena Medved
- (Russia) Tatiana Skotnikova
- (Spain) Nagore Calderón
- (Spain) Irene Paredes

== Overall statistics ==
Team	Pld	W	D	L	Pts	APts	GF	AGF	GA	AGA	GD	AGD	CS	ACS	YC	AYC	RC	ARC
Denmark	5	0	4	1	4	0.80	5	1.00	6	1.20	−1	−0.20	0	0.00	4	0.80	0	0.00
England	3	0	1	2	1	0.33	3	1.00	7	2.33	−4	−1.33	0	0.00	3	1.00	0	0.00
Finland	3	0	2	1	2	0.67	1	0.33	6	2.00	−5	−1.67	1	0.33	4	1.33	0	0.00
France	4	3	1	0	10	2.50	8	2.00	2	0.50	+6	1.50	2	0.50	1	0.25	0	0.00
Germany	6	4	1	1	13	2.17	6	1.00	1	0.17	+5	0.83	5	0.83	6	1.00	0	0.00
Iceland	4	1	1	2	4	1.00	2	0.50	8	2.00	−6	−1.50	1	0.25	4	1.00	0	0.00
Italy	4	1	1	2	4	1.00	3	0.75	5	1.25	−2	−0.50	1	0.25	11	2.75	0	0.00
Netherlands	3	0	1	2	1	0.33	0	0.00	2	0.67	−2	−0.67	1	0.33	3	1.00	0	0.00
Norway	6	3	2	1	11	1.83	7	1.17	4	0.67	+3	0.50	2	0.33	4	0.67	0	0.00
Russia	3	0	2	1	2	0.67	3	1.00	5	1.67	−2	−0.67	0	0.00	4	1.33	0	0.00
Spain	4	1	1	2	4	1.00	5	1.25	7	1.75	−2	−0.50	0	0.00	2	0.50	0	0.00
Sweden	5	3	1	1	10	2.00	13	2.60	3	0.60	+10	2.00	2	0.40	2	0.40	0	0.00
Total																		

Updated to games played on 28 July 2013. Team(s) rendered in italics represent(s) the host nation(s). The competition's winning team is rendered in bold.
