= Örjans Vall =

Sports ground in Halmstad, Sweden

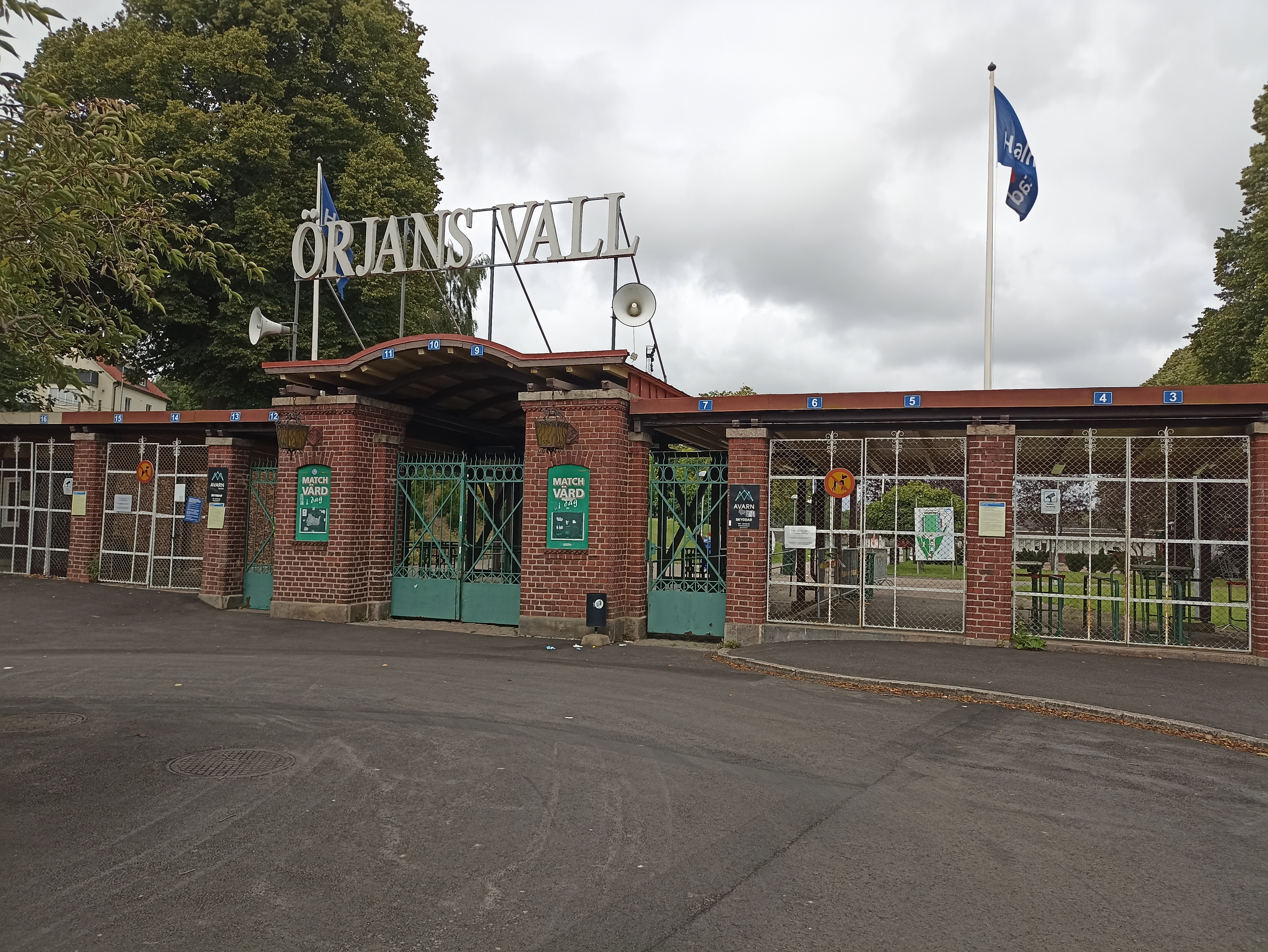
- Örjans Vall entrance
- Interactive map of Örjans Vall
- Full name: Örjans Vall
- Former names: Halmstads Idrottsplats (July–August 1922)
- Location: Halmstad, Sweden
- Coordinates: 56°41′03″N 12°51′59″E
- Owner: Halmstad Municipality
- Operator: Halmstad Municipality
- Capacity: 11,100
- Surface: Grass
- Field size: 105 x 68 m

Construction
- Built: 1922
- Opened: 30 July 1922
- Renovated: 1972 and 2017

Tenants
- Halmstads BK; IS Halmia

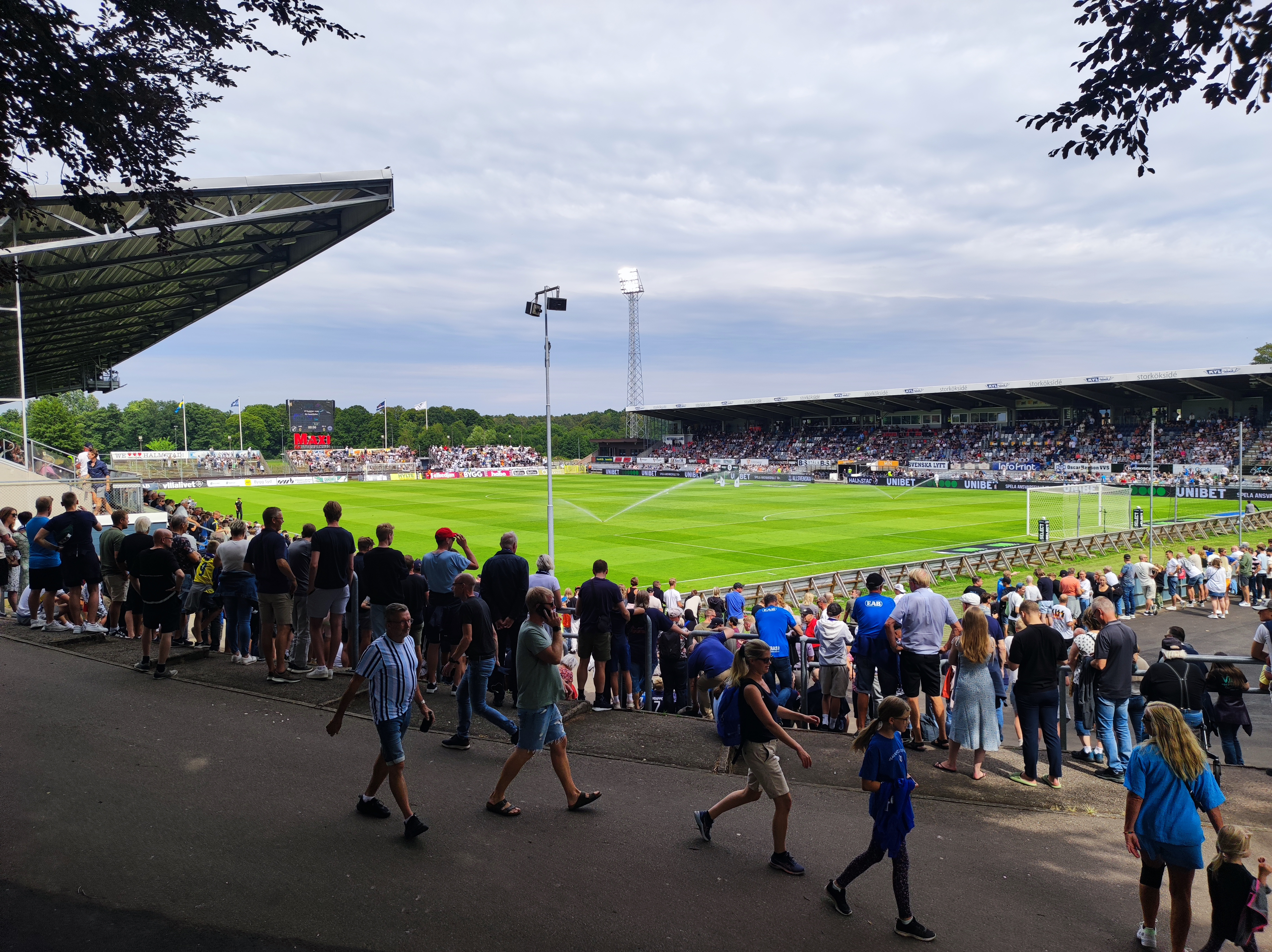
Örjans Vall before a fixture between Halmstad and Värnamo in 2023.

Örjans Vall is a football stadium in Halmstad, Sweden, built in 1922.

== History ==
The stadium was originally named Halmstads Idrottsplats (eng: Halmstad's Sports Ground), and was inaugurated by the Crown Prince of Sweden Gustaf Adolf, later king of Sweden, on 30 July 1922. 12,000 people had been allowed entrance to see the opening, several thousands more had gathered outside the fence and on Galgberget. In August 1922 the name of the arena changed to Örjans Vall after a medieval hospital by the name of S:t Örjans that had earlier been on the same location. On 3 September 1922 the first football game was played there. Örjans Vall has been used for many different sports over the years, the football field was surrounded by running tracks, until the 1980s, and was the main site for the local athletic clubs. In the winter of 1956, due to very cold weather, the running tracks were covered with water freezing into a skating rink, Sigvard "Sigge" Ericsson, who had won one gold and one silver medal in the recent 1956 Winter Olympics, participated. In 1972 the present day main-stand and scoreboard was completed, replacing the original wooden constructions from 1922.

The record for most spectators during a match is held by IS Halmia, in 1962 when Halmia played a qualification match against Landskrona BoIS, 20,381 spectators turned up to see the match.

In 2004 when Gyllene Tider celebrated 25 years, by starting and ending their national tour on Örjans Vall.

== Demand for a new stadium ==
In the 2000s HBK supporters started to demand a new stadium, as the club had reached international competitions, but were not allowed to play on Örjans Vall due to security restrictions. They have instead been forced to play at Ullevi in Göteborg or Olympia in Helsingborg.

Temporary 2008 chairman Birgitta Johansson stated that a new stadium should be ready at the earliest in 2011–2012.

In September 2008 a decision to build a new stadium was reached by the local authorities, the new stadium would be placed at Sannarp's recreation ground and Örjans Vall was to be demolished and replaced by apartments. The new arena was planned to be completed in 2012, however on 5 May 2009 it was announced that there would not be a new arena as the Alliance city council announced its budget proposition.

On 17 December 2013, Halmstad Municipality decided to carry out a renovation of Örjans Vall worth 75 million SEK. The renovation was planned to be completed by the 2015 season, but was delayed. The whole renovation was finally completed in 2017.

As of 2025, Halmstad Municipality is conducting a feasibility study to determine if a new arena can be built on the same site as the old one.

== International tournaments ==
Örjans Vall have been used for a number of different international tournaments held in Sweden.

=== FIFA World Cup ===
Sweden was selected to host the 1958 FIFA World Cup, among the cities chosen to host the World Cup was Halmstad. Örjans Vall came to host two games of Group 1.

8 June 1958
19:00 (CET)

Northern Ireland	1 – 0	Czechoslovakia
Cush 21'	Report

Örjans Vall, Halmstad
Attendance: 10,647
Referee: Seipelt (Austria)

11 June 1958
19:00 (CET)

Argentina	3 – 1	Northern Ireland
Corbatta 37' (pen.); Menéndez 56'; Avio 60'	Report	McParland 4'

Örjans Vall, Halmstad
Attendance: 14,174
Referee: Ahlner (Sweden)

=== UEFA Under-21 European Championship ===
The 2009 U21 European Championship, which was played in Sweden, was originally meant to be played at Gamla Ullevi in Gothenburg, Olympia in Helsingborg, Swedbank Stadion in Malmö, and Borås Arena in Borås, however Borås Arena have a Max Hamburgers restaurant on the arena area, which caused legal problem since the tournament is sponsored by McDonald's, for some time it appeared that the Max restaurant would be closed during the tournament, however Max refused later to close its restaurant and the competition was forced to move elsewhere and Örjans Vall in Halmstad was chosen as replacement for Borås.

Örjans Vall was used for 3 games in the tournament in group B.

15 June 2009
18:15

England	2 – 1	Finland
Cattermole 15'; Richards 53'	Report	Sparv 33' (pen.)

Örjans Vall, Halmstad
Attendance: 6,828
Referee: Cüneyt Çakır (Turkey)

18 June 2009
18:15

Germany	2 – 0	Finland
Höwedes 59'; Dejagah 61'	Report

Örjans Vall, Halmstad
Attendance: 6,011
Referee: Peter Rasmussen (Denmark)

22 June 2009
20:45

Germany	1 – 1	England
Castro 5'	Report	Rodwell 30'

Örjans Vall, Halmstad
Attendance: 7,414
Referee: Peter Rasmussen (Denmark)

=== UEFA Women's Euro ===
Örjans Vall was selected as one of seven stadiums to host the UEFA Women's Euro 2013 held in Sweden. The stadium was host to three group stage matches in the Group A and one of the quarter-finals.

==== Group A ====
10 July 2013
18:00

Italy	0–0	Finland
	Report

Örjans Vall, Halmstad
Attendance: 3,011
Referee: Teodora Albon (Romania)

13 July 2013
18:00

Italy	2–1	Denmark
Gabbiadini 55'; Mauro 60'	Report	Brogaard 66'

Örjans Vall, Halmstad
Attendance: 2,190
Referee: Esther Staubli (Switzerland)

16 July 2013
20:30

Sweden	3–1	Italy
Manieri 47' (o.g.); Schelin 49'; Öqvist 57'	Report	Gabbiadini 78'

Örjans Vall, Halmstad
Attendance: 7,288
Referee: Katalin Kulcsár (Hungary)

==== Quarter-final ====
21 July 2013
15:00

Sweden	4–0	Iceland
M. Hammarström 3'; Öqvist 14'; Schelin 19', 59'	Report

Örjans Vall, Halmstad
Attendance: 7,468
Referee: Kirsi Heikkinen (Finland)
