= Nea-Stina Liljedahl =

Finnish footballer (born 1993)

Personal information
- Full name: Nea-Stina Liljedahl
- Date of birth: 16 January 1993 (age 33)
- Place of birth: Helsinki, Finland
- Height: 1.70 m (5 ft 7 in)
- Positions: Centre back; defensive midfielder

Team information
- Current team: FC Honka
- Number: 14

Senior career*
Years	Team	Apps	(Gls)
2007–2012	HJK	81	(8)
2013–	FC Honka		
- * Club domestic league appearances and goals

Nea-Stina Liljedahl (born 16 January 1993) is a Finnish footballer currently playing for FC Honka's women's team in the Naisten Liiga. She was a Finland under-19 international.

Liljedahl, who can play in midfield or defence, moved from HJK to FC Honka ahead of the 2013 season. Liljedahl had played in 81 league games for HJK, scoring eight goals. She acquired the nickname "Nekku" after a type of traditional Finnish confection which she had developed a fondness for.

Following an injury to Maija Saari, national coach Andrée Jeglertz's drafted the uncapped Liljedahl into his Finland squad for UEFA Women's Euro 2013.
