= Tiina Saario =

Finnish footballer (born 1982)

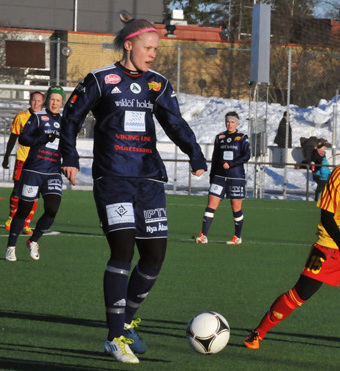
- Playing for Åland United in February 2013

Personal information
- Full name: Tiina Saario
- Date of birth: January 15, 1982 (age 44)
- Place of birth: Helsinki, Finland
- Height: 5 ft 8 in (1.73 m)
- Position: Midfielder

Team information
- Current team: MPS

Youth career
- FC Viikingit

Senior career*
Years	Team	Apps	(Gls)
1998–2000	PuiU		
2001	Springfield Sirens		
2002	MPS		
2002–2005	Barry University		
2004	KMF		
2008	KontU		(1)
2009	Veto		
2010–2012	HJK Helsinki	65	(13)
2013	Åland United	23	(14)
2014–	MPS	7	(4)

International career^{‡}
1999–2013	Finland	22	(0)
- * Club domestic league appearances and goals as of 5 July 2013 ‡ National team caps and goals as of 17:08, 17 July 2013 (UTC)

Tiina Saario (born 15 January 1982) is a Finnish football midfielder. She plays club football for MPS in the Finnish second tier Naisten Ykkönen.

== Club career ==
In 2002 Saario went to Barry University to study criminology and play for the varsity soccer team. She turned out for Springfield Sirens in the 2001 W-League season.

After university Saario drifted away from football, but eventually started playing again for smaller clubs KontU and Veto. She agreed to join Naisten Liiga HJK Helsinki in 2010.

In the 2010 Finnish Women's Cup final, Saario suffered a serious head injury in which her jaw was broken and she lost several teeth. Åland United signed her ahead of the 2013 season. In June 2014 it was announced that Saario will rejoin Åland for the qualifying round of the 2014–15 UEFA Women's Champions League.

== International career ==
Saario made her debut for the Finland women's national football team in February 1999, having turned 17 the previous month. She played 90 minutes of a 3–1 defeat to the United States in Orlando, Florida. At the 1999 Algarve Cup Saario made two further appearances, but did not play for her country again until April 2002; a 3–0 defeat to the United States in San Jose, California.

Saario remained on four national team caps until February 2012, when she returned to the team for a friendly with Russia after an absence of almost 10 years. In June 2013 Saario was named in national coach Andrée Jeglertz's Finland squad for UEFA Women's Euro 2013.

== Honours ==
=== Club ===
Åland United

- Finnish League: 2013

HJK Helsinki

Winner

- Finnish Women's Cup: 2010
- Liiga Cup Naiset: 2011, 2012
