= Soffía Arnþrúður Gunnarsdóttir =

Association football player

Personal information
- Date of birth: 22 October 1987 (age 39)
- Position: Midfielder

Senior career*
Years	Team	Apps	(Gls)
2001–2004	Sindri	30	(14)
2005–2013	Stjarnan	130	(19)
2014	Jitex BK	9	(1)

International career
2014	Iceland	1	(0)
- * Club domestic league appearances and goals

Soffía Arnþrúður Gunnarsdóttir (born 22 October 1987) is an Icelandic football player who last played as a midfielder for Swedish club Jitex BK of the Damallsvenskan. Soffía began her career with Sindri before joining Stjarnan in 2004, where she went on to make 130 appearances in the Úrvalsdeild kvenna, the top division of Icelandic women's football. She transferred to Jitex ahead of the 2014 season, and went on to make nine league appearances for the Swedish side before her season was ended by a cruciate ligament injury.

== International career ==
Soffía Arnþrúður Gunnarsdóttir was also part of the Icelandic team at the 2013 European Championships. Soffía represented Iceland once, playing in the 5–0 defeat to Germany on 5 March 2014.
