= Susanna Lehtinen =

Finnish footballer (born 1983)

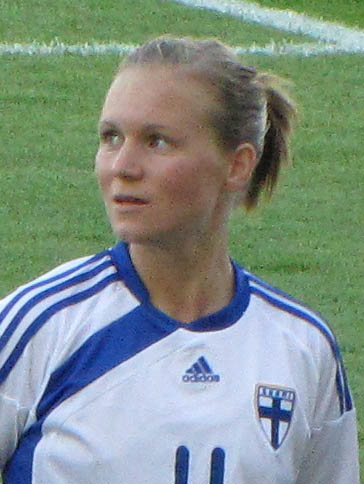

Personal information
- Full name: Susanna Minttu Maria Lehtinen
- Date of birth: 8 May 1983 (age 43)
- Place of birth: Finland
- Height: 1.60 m (5 ft 3 in)
- Positions: Defender; midfielder

College career
| Years | Team | Apps | (Gls) |
| 2004–2007 | Florida Atlantic Owls | 72 | (26) |

Senior career*
| Years | Team | Apps | (Gls) |
| 2000–2004 | Espoo | | |
| 2005–2007 | Honka | | |
| 2007 | Jersey Sky Blue | | |
| 2008–2015 | Örebro | 169 | (5) |

International career^{‡}
| 2005–2014 | Finland | 80 | (3) |
- * Club domestic league appearances and goals as of 00:02, 17 February 2016 (UTC) ‡ National team caps and goals as of 17:07, 31 August 2014 (UTC)

Susanna Minttu Maria Lehtinen (born 8 May 1983) is a retired Finnish football midfielder. She last played in the Swedish Damallsvenskan for KIF Örebro, a club she represented for eight seasons. She has also played for FC Espoo, FC Honka (Naisten Liiga) and Florida Atlantic Owls (NCAA).

She was a member of the Finnish national team from 2005 until 2014, representing her country at the UEFA Women's Euro 2009. In June 2013 Lehtinen was also selected by the national coach Andrée Jeglertz to be part of the squad at the UEFA Women's Euro 2013.
