= Heidi Kivelä =

Finnish footballer (born 1988)

Personal information
- Full name: Heidi Kivelä
- Date of birth: 6 November 1988 (age 37)
- Place of birth: Finland
- Height: 1.72 m (5 ft 8 in)
- Position: Midfielder

Team information
- Current team: PK-35
- Number: 5

Senior career*
Years	Team	Apps	(Gls)
2006–2011	FC Ilves		(42)
2011–	PK-35	26	(15)

International career^{‡}
2013–	Finland	11	(0)
- * Club domestic league appearances and goals as of 11:50, 18 March 2013 (UTC) ‡ National team caps and goals as of 17:10, 31 August 2014 (UTC)

Heidi Kivelä (born 6 November 1988) is a Finnish football midfielder currently playing in the Naistenliiga for PK-35 Vantaa, with whom she has also played in the UEFA Champions League. She made her debut for the Finnish national team against Russia in February 2013 and went to the 2013 Cyprus Cup.

In June 2013 Kivelä was named in national coach Andrée Jeglertz's Finland squad for UEFA Women's Euro 2013.
