= Karoline Smidt Nielsen =

Danish footballer (born 1994)

Karoline Nielsen
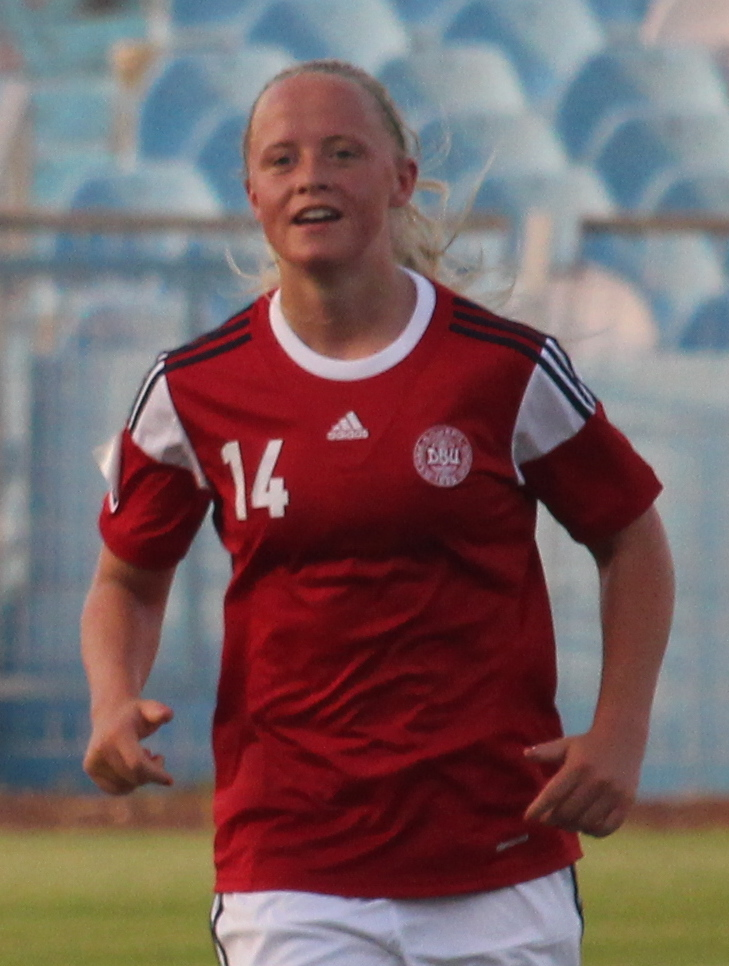

Personal information
- Full name: Karoline Smidt Nielsen
- Date of birth: 12 May 1994 (age 32)
- Place of birth: Odense, Denmark
- Height: 1.76 m (5 ft 9 1/2 in)
- Position: Attacking midfielder

Youth career
- HPTI
- B 1913

Senior career*
Years	Team	Apps	(Gls)
2009–2012	OB Odense		
2012–2018	Fortuna Hjørring		
2018–2022	Turbine Potsdam	8	(2)

International career^{‡}
2009–2011	Denmark U-17	12	(4)
2011–2013	Denmark U-19	23	(8)
2012–2018	Denmark	24	(5)
- * Club domestic league appearances and goals as of 07:47, 14 December 2022 (UTC) ‡ National team caps and goals as of 07:47, 14 December 2022 (UTC)

Karoline Smidt Nielsen (born 12 May 1994) is a Danish former footballer who played as an attacking midfielder for Turbine Potsdam of the German Frauen-Bundesliga as well as for the Denmark women's national football team.

== Club career ==
Smidt Nielsen joined Fortuna Hjørring from OB Odense in summer 2012. She began playing in the boys' team at HPTI from being four years old, then played for B 1913 from 11 to 15, then joined OB where she played her first matches in the Danish Women's League.

She was forced to retire in October 2022, following a series of injuries which restricted her to nine appearances for her German club Turbine Potsdam since joining them in 2018.

== International career ==
In December 2012 Smidt Nielsen made her senior international debut as a second-half substitute for Pernille Harder in Denmark's 5–0 win over Mexico in São Paulo, Brazil.

She was selected in national coach Kenneth Heiner-Møller's Denmark squad for UEFA Women's Euro 2013.

== Personal life ==
Karoline's mother Lone Smidt Nielsen (née Hansen) is also a former international footballer, who played professionally in Italy.

== Honours ==
=== Club ===
Fortuna Hjørring

Winner

- Elitedivisionen: 2013–14, 2015–16, 2017–18
- Danish Women's Cup: 2016
