= Marianna Tolvanen =

Finnish footballer (born 1992)

Personal information
- Full name: Marianna Tolvanen
- Date of birth: 27 December 1992 (age 33)
- Place of birth: Espoo, Finland
- Height: 1.69 m (5 ft 6 1/2 in)
- Position: Striker

Team information
- Current team: Åland United
- Number: 9

Senior career*
Years	Team	Apps	(Gls)
2008–2010	Honka	44	(11)
2011–2012	HJK	50	(28)
2013	Honka		
2014–	Åland United		

International career^{‡}
2011–	Finland	32	(4)
- * Club domestic league appearances and goals as of 17 March 2013 ‡ National team caps and goals as of 18:40, 13 July 2013 (UTC)

Marianna Tolvanen (born 27 December 1992) is a Finnish footballer currently playing for FC Honka in the Naisten Liiga. She is also a member of the Finnish national team since 2011.

Tolvanen started her career in Honka. In 2011, she moved to HJK Helsinki, where she was the 2011 season's second top scorer with 17 goals. In 2013, she returned to Honka.

In June 2013 Tolvanen was named in national coach Andrée Jeglertz's Finland squad for UEFA Women's Euro 2013.

== Titles ==
- 1 Finnish League (2008)
- 1 Finnish Cup (2009)
