= Cecilie Sandvej =

Danish footballer (born 1990)

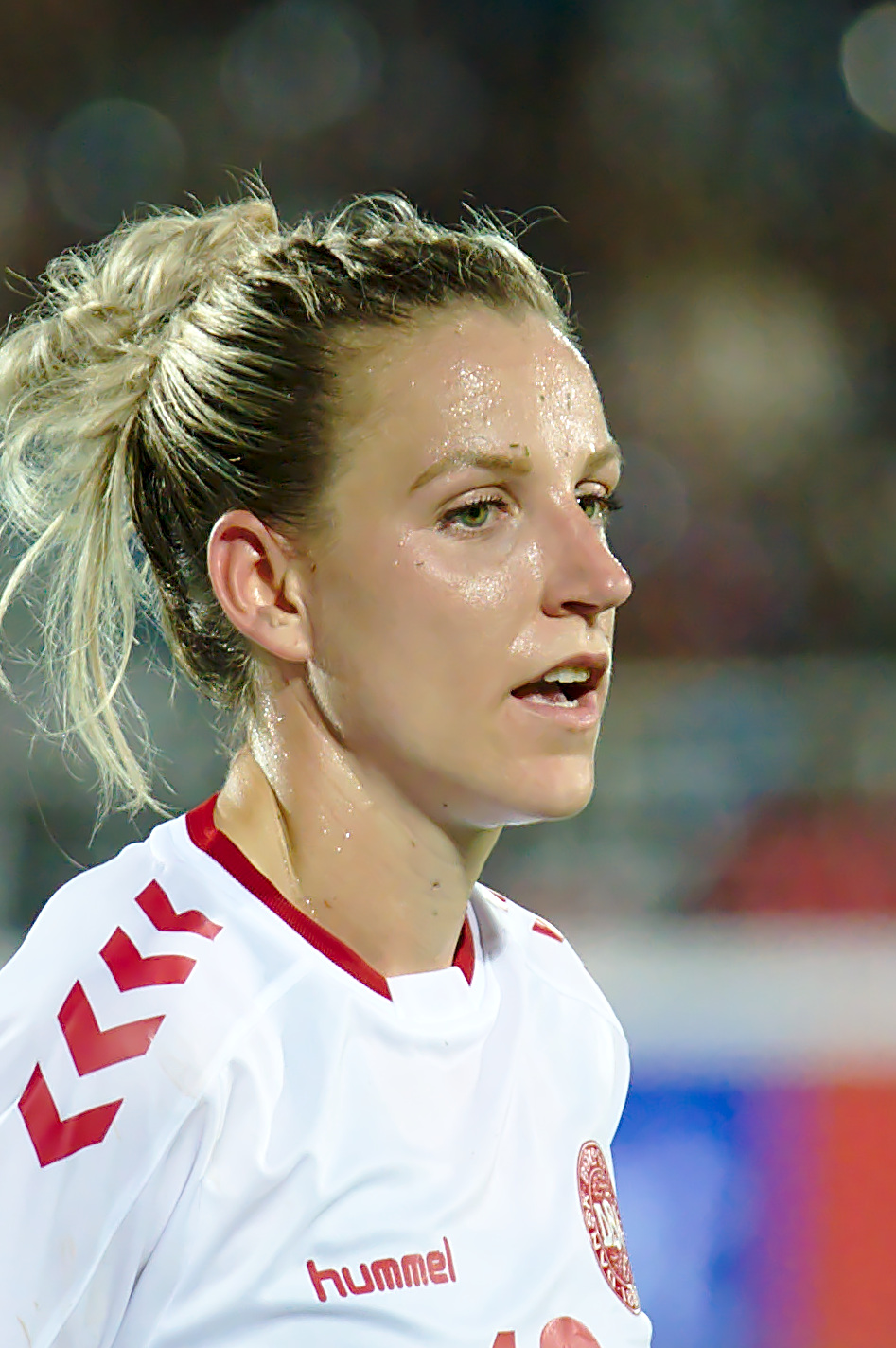
- Sandvej in 2017

Personal information
- Full name: Cecilie Feddersen Sandvej
- Date of birth: 13 June 1990 (age 36)
- Place of birth: Horsens, Denmark
- Height: 1.73 m (5 ft 8 in)
- Position: Left back

Youth career
- Horsens SIK

Senior career*
Years	Team	Apps	(Gls)
- SønderjyskE
2009–2013	Brøndby IF	63	(5)
2013–2014	Perth Glory	11	(0)
2014	Washington Spirit	0	(0)
2014–2017	SC Sand	64	(1)
2017–2019	FFC Frankfurt	32	(0)
2019–2021	FC Fleury 91	28	(1)
2021–2022	Birmingham City	5	(0)
2022–2024	Dijon	31	(0)
2024–2025	Napoli	9	(0)
2025–2026	Como 1907	0	(0)

International career
2006–2007	Denmark U-17	16	(3)
2007–2009	Denmark U-19	21	(1)
2011	Denmark U-23	1	(0)
2009–2019	Denmark	34	(1)
Medal record
Women's football
Representing Denmark
UEFA Women's Championship
Silver medal – second place	2017 Netherlands	Team
- * Club domestic league appearances and goals

Cecilie Feddersen Sandvej (born 13 June 1990) is a Danish former professional footballer who played as a left-back. At club level Sandvej represented Danish A-Liga sides SønderjyskE and Brøndby and sides in the top European leagues including German Frauen-Bundesliga club Eintracht Frankfurt, English Women's Super League club Birmingham City, and Italian Serie A clubs Napoli and Como 1907. She won silver with Denmark national team at the 2017 Euros. Sandvej earned 34 caps and scored one goal for the Denmark national team. She retired her active playing career in August 2026.

== Club career ==
Sandvej joined Brøndby IF in 2009, having previously played for Horsens SIK and SønderjydskE.

In October 2013 the Perth Glory announced that Sandvej would be with the club for the 2013–2014 season. Sandvej played in all eleven matches for the Glory, who finished in fifth place.

In February 2014, Sandvej signed with the Washington Spirit of the NWSL. She didn't get capped at all during her time in the NWSL and during the summer, she transferred to SC Sand in the Bundesliga.

In 2017, she signed with 1. FFC Frankfurt.

In August 2021, she signed for Birmingham City in the FAWSL.

== International career ==
Sandvej made her senior international debut in July 2009, as a substitute in a 2–1 friendly win over Iceland in Staines, England. She was named in national coach Kenneth Heiner-Møller's Denmark squad for UEFA Women's Euro 2013. In 2017, she was named to Denmark's UEFA Women's Euro 2017 squad.

== Honours ==
Brøndby IF

- Elitedivisionen: 2010–11, 2011–12, 2012–13
- Danish Women's Cup: 2010–11, 2011–12, 2012–13
