= Chiara Marchitelli =

Italian footballer (born 1985)

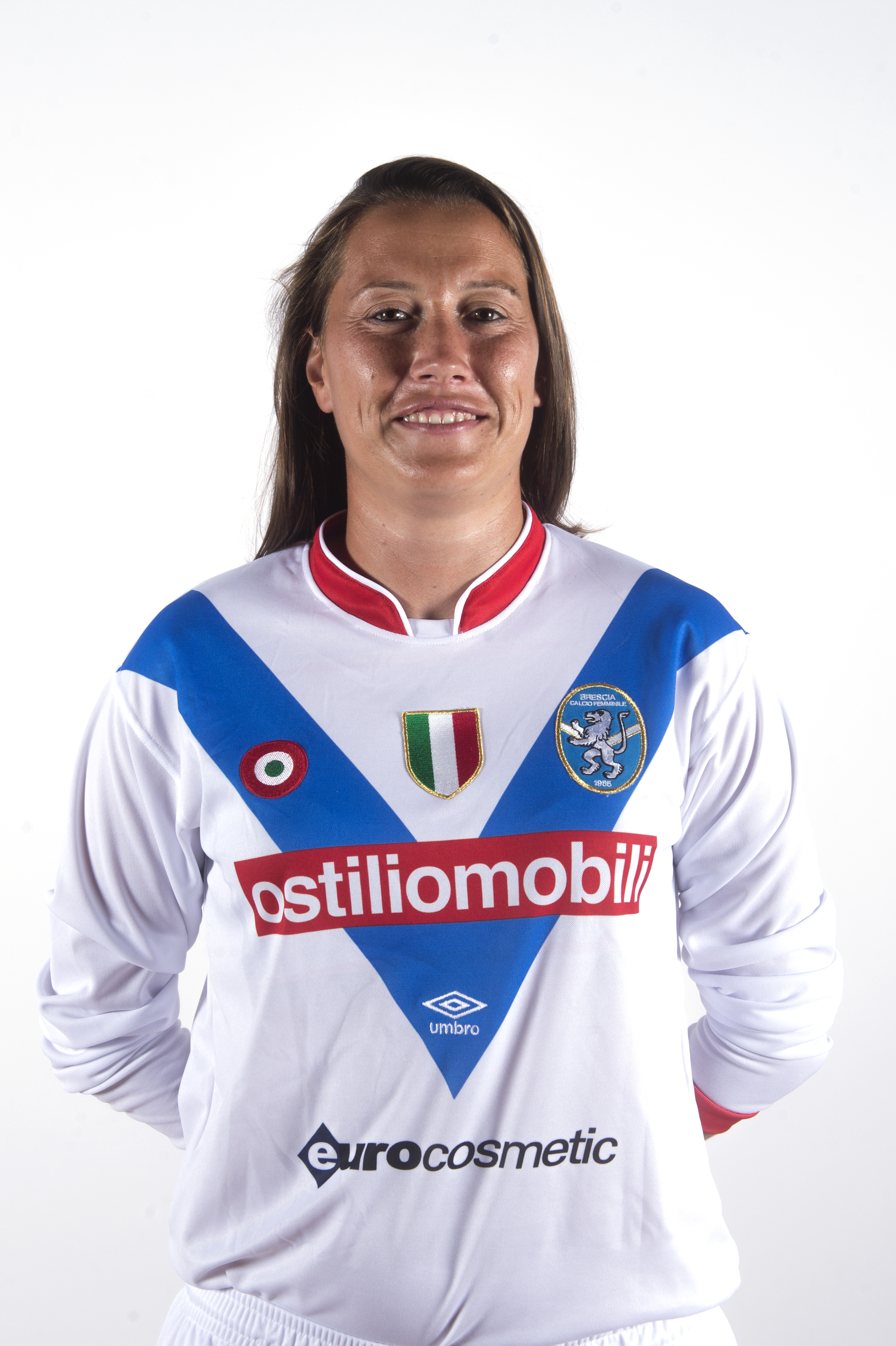
- Marchitelli in 2016

Personal information
- Full name: Chiara Marchitelli
- Date of birth: 4 May 1985 (age 41)
- Place of birth: Rome, Italy
- Height: 1.70 m (5 ft 7 in)
- Position: Goalkeeper

Senior career*
Years	Team	Apps	(Gls)
1999–2004	Lazio		
2004–2005	Atletico Oristano		
2005–2008	Fiammamonza		
2008–2009	Roma CF		
2009–2013	Tavagnacco	80	(0)
2013–2018	ACF Brescia	65	(0)
2018–2019	Florentia	10	(0)
2019–2021	Inter Milan	20	(0)

International career
2006–2019	Italy	52	(0)
- * Club domestic league appearances and goals

Chiara Marchitelli (born 4 May 1985) is an Italian former footballer who played as a goalkeeper. She has won four league titles with SS Lazio, ASD Fiammamonza and ACF Brescia Femminile (twice).

== International career ==
Marchitelli made her senior Italy national team debut in September 2006, a 1–0 friendly win over the Republic of Ireland at Richmond Park, Dublin. Although she had already been a reserve goalkeeper in Italy's squad at UEFA Women's Euro 2005.

Marchitelli was called up to the Italy squad for the UEFA Women's Euro 2017.

Marchitelli was called up to the Italy squad for the 2019 FIFA Women's World Cup.
