= Laura Kivistö =

Finnish footballer (born 1981)

Personal information
- Full name: Laura Kivistö
- Date of birth: 26 June 1981 (age 45)
- Place of birth: Raahe, Finland
- Height: 1.66 m (5 ft 5 1/2 in)
- Position: Defender

Team information
- Current team: PK-35 Vantaa
- Number: 8

Senior career*
Years	Team	Apps	(Gls)
2008–2012	HJK Helsinki	96	(2)
2013–2014	PK-35 Vantaa	44	(0)

International career
2003–2014	Finland	15	(0)
- * Club domestic league appearances and goals

Laura Kivistö (born 26 June 1981) is a Finnish former defender.

She played for PK-35 Vantaa in the Naisten Liiga.

== Club career ==
She played for HJK Helsinki before joining PK-35 Vantaa in 2013.

== International career ==
She was called up to be part of the national team for UEFA Women's Euro 2013.

== Honours ==
=== Club ===
HJK Helsinki

Winner

- Finnish Women's Cup: 2010
- Liiga Cup Naiset: 2010, 2011, 2012
