= Kristin Hammarström =

Swedish footballer

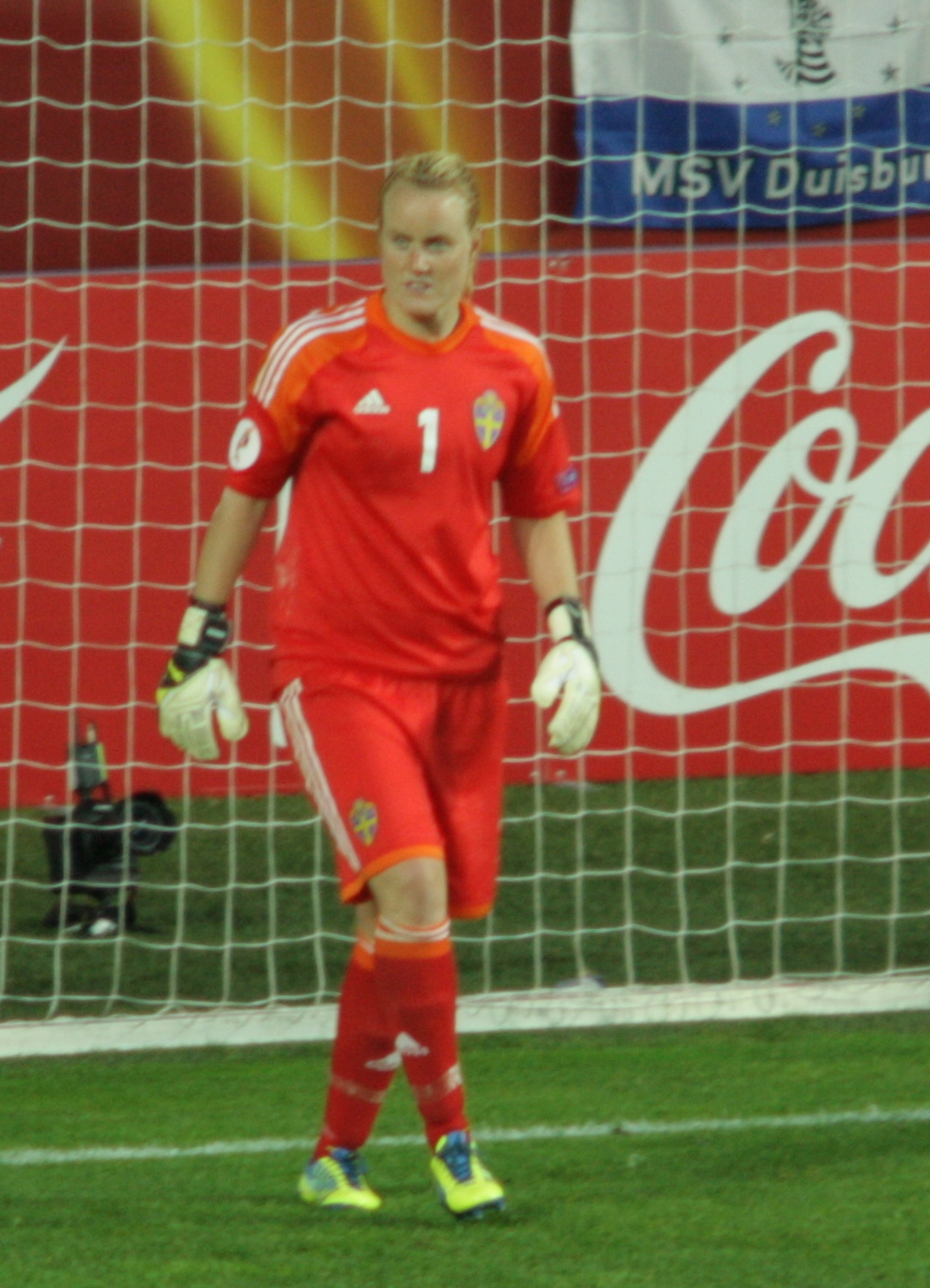

Personal information
- Full name: Anna Kristin Hammarström
- Date of birth: 29 March 1982 (age 44)
- Place of birth: Glanshammar, Sweden
- Height: 1.72 m (5 ft 8 in)
- Position: Goalkeeper

Senior career*
| Years | Team | Apps | (Gls) |
| 2000–2010 | KIF Örebro DFF | 163 | (0) |
| 2011–2013 | Kopparbergs/Göteborg FC | 65 | (0) |

International career^{‡}
| 2008–2013 | Sweden | 29 | (0) |
Medal record
Women's football
Representing Sweden
FIFA Women's World Cup
| Bronze medal – third place | 2011 Germany | Team |
- * Club domestic league appearances and goals as of 21:30, 26 November 2013 (UTC) ‡ National team caps and goals as of 21:30, 26 November 2013 (UTC)

Anna Kristin Hammarström (born 29 March 1982) is a Swedish former football goalkeeper who played for KIF Örebro DFF and Kopparbergs/Göteborg FC of the Swedish Damallsvenskan. She represented Sweden women's national football team at the 2011 FIFA Women's World Cup. She is the twin sister of fellow national team footballer Marie Hammarström.

In November 2013 both sisters announced their immediate retirement from football. A year later, after the birth of her first child, Hammarström was reportedly in talks with Sweden coach Pia Sundhage about a playing comeback.
