= Roberta D'Adda =

Italian footballer (born 1981)

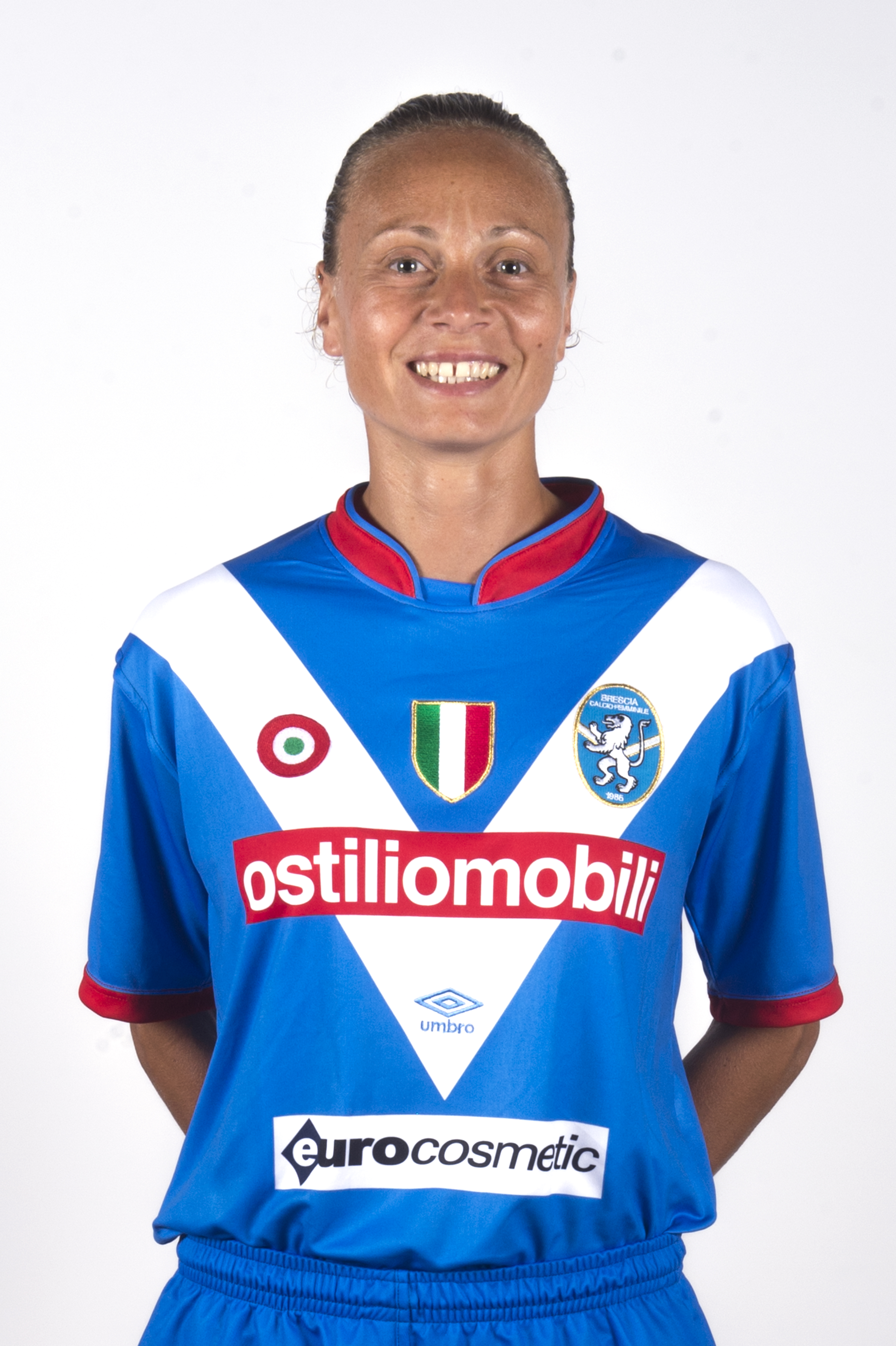
- D'Adda in 2016

Personal information
- Full name: Roberta D'Adda
- Date of birth: 5 October 1981 (age 45)
- Place of birth: Vimercate, Italy
- Height: 1.65 m (5 ft 5 in)
- Position: Defender

Senior career*
Years	Team	Apps	(Gls)
1997–2000	Verderio		
2000–2008	Fiammamonza		
2008–2010	Bardolino	41	(3)
2010–2017	Brescia	175	(6)
2017–2018	Sassuolo	21	(0)
2018–2020	Inter Milan	34	(1)

International career
2007–2014	Italy	90	(1)
- * Club domestic league appearances and goals

Roberta D'Adda (born 5 October 1981) is a former Italian football who played as a defender. She has won four leagues with ASD Fiammamonza, CF Bardolino and ACF Brescia. D'Adda was part of the Italian squad at the 2009 and 2013 editions of the UEFA Women's Championship.

== International career ==
D'Adda made her senior debut for the Italy women's national football team in June 2006, in a 7–0 win over Serbia and Montenegro in Belgrade during qualifying for the 2007 FIFA Women's World Cup.

At UEFA Women's Euro 2009 in Finland, D'Adda played in all four games as the Italians reached the quarter-finals. National coach Antonio Cabrini named D'Adda in his selection for UEFA Women's Euro 2013 in Sweden. In the 2015 FIFA World Cup qualifiers she scored her first goal for the national team. She hasn't taken part in subsequent qualifying stages.

Goals for the Italian WNT in official competitions
Competition	Stage	Date	Location	Opponent	Goals	Result	Overall
2015 FIFA World Cup	Qualifiers	2014–09–17	Vercelli	North Macedonia	1	15–0	1

== Honours ==
- Titles
  - Serie A (4): 2005–06, 2008–09, 2013–14, 2015–16
  - Coppa Italia (4): 2008–09, 2011–12, 2014–15, 2015–16
  - Supercoppa Italiana (5): 2005–06, 2013–14, 2014–15, 2015–16, 2016–17
- Best result in other competitions
  - UEFA Champions League (quarterfinalist): 2015–16
