= Annica Sjölund =

Finnish footballer (born 1985)

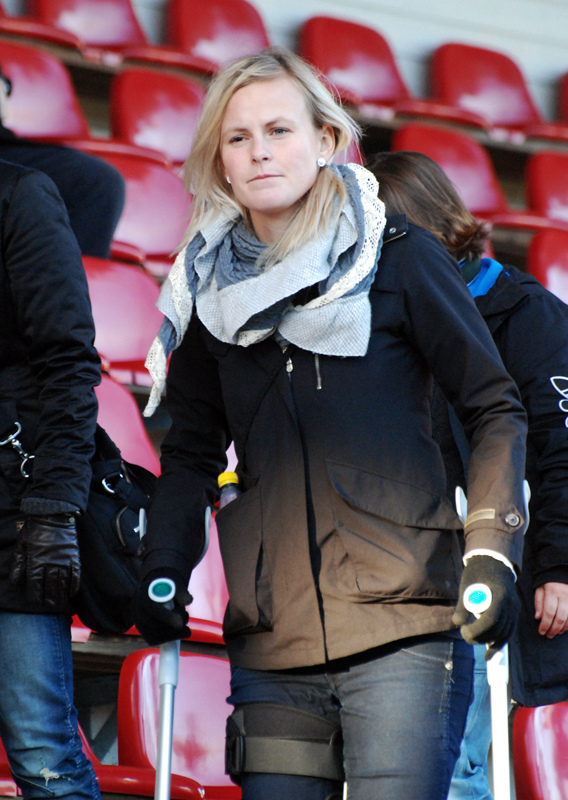

Personal information
- Full name: Annica Maria Sjölund
- Date of birth: 31 March 1985 (age 41)
- Place of birth: Finström, Åland, Finland
- Height: 1.79 m (5 ft 10 in)
- Position: Striker

Youth career
- IF Finströms Kamraterna

Senior career*
Years	Team	Apps	(Gls)
2002	Älvsjö AIK		
2003–2005	FC United (Pietarsaari)		
2006–2007	Åland United		
2008–2009	AIK	41	(15)
2010–2013	Jitex BK	65	(28)
2014–2015	Kopparbergs/Göteborg FC	18	(6)

International career^{‡}
2006–2014	Finland	67	(16)
- * Club domestic league appearances and goals as of 22:06, 20 July 2015 (UTC) ‡ National team caps and goals as of 13:53, 25 August 2014 (UTC)

Annica Maria Sjölund (born 31 March 1985) is a Finnish football striker, who last played for Kopparbergs/Göteborg FC of Sweden's Damallsvenskan. She previously played for FC United Pietarsaari and Åland United in Finland's Naisten Liiga and Jitex BK, Älvsjö AIK and AIK in Sweden.

== Club career ==
In August 2012 Sjölund sustained an anterior cruciate ligament injury while playing for Jitex in a match against Örebro.

Sjölund left Jitex after the 2013 Damallsvenskan season. She was wanted by former club Åland United, but decided to stay in Sweden with Kopparbergs/Göteborg FC.

== International career ==
She is a member of the Finnish national team; scoring on her debut against Belgium in May 2006. She took part in the 2009 European Championship, where she scored one goal in the quarter-finals against England.

National coach Andrée Jeglertz selected Sjölund in Finland's squad for UEFA Women's Euro 2013, where she scored the team's only goal at the tournament – a late equaliser in a 1–1 draw with Denmark.

Sjölund also represented Åland at the Island Games football tournament in 2001 and 2007.

== Personal life ==
Her brother Daniel Sjölund is also an international footballer.
