= Ella Vanhanen =

Finnish footballer (born 1993)

Personal information
- Full name: Ella Vanhanen
- Date of birth: September 15, 1993 (age 33)
- Place of birth: Kuopio, Finland
- Height: 5 ft 5 in (1.65 m)
- Positions: Striker; defender

College career
Years	Team	Apps	(Gls)
2013	Pittsburgh Panthers		

Senior career*
Years	Team	Apps	(Gls)
2009–2011	KMF	50	(3)
2010–2012	Pallokissat	36	(5)
2014–2016	Åland United	52	(7)
2017–2018	Pallokissat	32	(4)
2019–2021	KuPS	39	(1)
Total		209	(20)

International career^{‡}
2010–2012	Finland U-19	11	(0)
2013–2021	Finland	7	(0)
- * Club domestic league appearances and goals as of 22:36, 14 October 2024 (UTC) ‡ National team caps and goals as of 19:56, 13 September 2014 (UTC)

Ella Vanhanen (born 15 September 1993) is a Finnish former footballer.

== Club career ==
Vanhanen made her league debut for KMF against NiceFutis on 17 June 2009. She scored her first league goal against United Pietarsaari on 30 April 2011, scoring in the 17th minute.

During her first spell, Vanhanen made her league debut for Pallokissat against Ilves on 14 April 2012. She scored her first league goal against FC Honka on 6 June 2012, scoring in the 73rd minute.

Vanhanen had played 100 matches in the Finnish league by the age of 21.

In February 2013 Vanhanen signed a National Letter of Intent to join the University of Pittsburgh, where she will play varsity soccer for the Pittsburgh Panthers.

Vanhanen scored on her league debut against FC Honka on 22 March 2014, scoring in the 89th minute.

On 2 November 2016, Vanhanen was announced at Palokissat. She made her league debut against PK-35 Vantaa on 18 March 2017. Vanhanen scored her first league goal against JJK Jyväskylä on 13 April 2017, scoring in the 57th minute.

Vanhanen made her league debut against FC Honka on 23 March 2019. She scored her first league goal against Åland United on 30 March 2019.

Vanhanen won the Kansallinen Liiga at the end of the 2021 season with KuPS.

== International career ==
Vanhanen was called up to be part of the national team for the UEFA Women's Euro 2013.

Vanhanen was called up to the 2014 Cyprus Women's Cup squad, and played against England on 7 March 2014.

== Personal life ==
Vanhanen has an older sister and a younger brother, and enjoys playing the drums. She enrolled in the College of Arts and Sciences.

== Honours ==
=== Club ===
Pallokissat

Runner-up

- Finnish Women's Cup: 2012
