= Christina Ørntoft =

Danish footballer (born 1985)

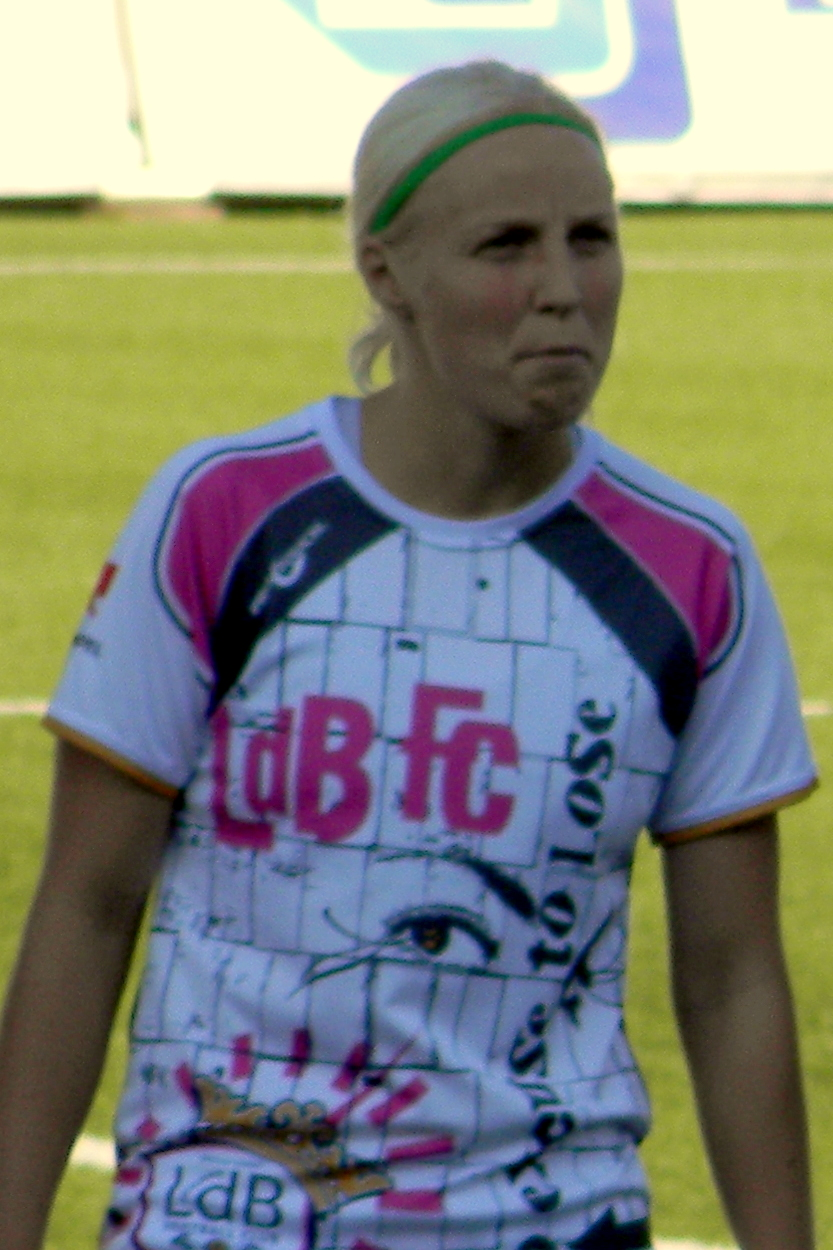
- Ørntoft in 2011

Personal information
- Full name: Christina Øyangen Ørntoft
- Date of birth: 2 July 1985 (age 41)
- Height: 1.72 m (5 ft 7 1/2 in)
- Position: Defender

Youth career
- Espergærde
- Lillerød

Senior career*
Years	Team	Apps	(Gls)
- Skovlunde IF
2008	Brøndby IF		
2008–2012	LdB FC Malmö	41	(3)
2012–2013	Brøndby IF		

International career^{‡}
2005–2013	Denmark	67	(1)
- * Club domestic league appearances and goals ‡ National team caps and goals as of 12:20, 5 September 2015 (UTC)

Christina Øyangen Ørntoft (born 2 July 1985) is a Danish former football defender. She most recently played for Elitedivisionen club Brøndby IF and the Danish national team.

In 2009, Ørntoft suffered an anterior cruciate ligament injury, which ruled her out of UEFA Women's Euro 2009. She re-injured the same knee in 2011.

Swedish Damallsvenskan club LdB FC Malmö signed Ørntoft during their 2008 season, after an injury to regular centre back Malin Levenstad. After playing with Skovlunde and, briefly, Brøndby in her homeland, Ørntoft had already acquired the nickname "Carlos" after Brazilian footballer Roberto Carlos. She would commute to Malmö from Copenhagen, where she had an apartment, boyfriend and was studying at University of Copenhagen. After four years at LdB FC Malmö, disrupted by the injuries, she returned to Brøndby IF in December 2012. In December 2013, she announced a break from football and moved into a youth coaching role with Brøndby due to her pregnancy.

She was named in national coach Kenneth Heiner-Møller's squad for UEFA Women's Euro 2013.
