= Jaana Lyytikäinen =

Finnish footballer (born 1982)

Personal information
- Full name: Jaana Lyytikäinen
- Date of birth: 22 October 1982 (age 44)
- Place of birth: Kuopio, Finland
- Positions: Midfielder; striker

Team information
- Current team: Åland United
- Number: 17

Senior career*
Years	Team	Apps	(Gls)
- KMF Kuopio
- FC Honka
2010	Åland United	22	(6)
2011	Pallokerho-35	24	(14)
2012	HJK		
2013–	Åland United		

International career^{‡}
2007–	Finland	37	(2)
- * Club domestic league appearances and goals ‡ National team caps and goals as of 18:41, 31 August 2014 (UTC)

Jaana Lyytikäinen (born 22 October 1982) is a Finnish footballer, currently playing for Åland United in Finland's Naisten Liiga. She has been a member of the senior Finland women's national football team since her debut against Scotland in September 2007.

National coach Andrée Jeglertz selected Lyytikäinen in Finland's squad for UEFA Women's Euro 2013, where she played in two of the Finns' three games.
