= Annika Kukkonen =

Finnish footballer (born 1990)

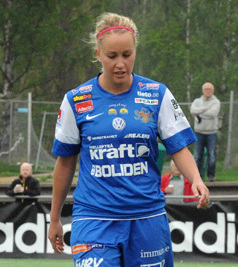
- Playing for Sunnanå in May 2013

Personal information
- Full name: Annika Kukkonen
- Date of birth: 12 April 1990 (age 36)
- Place of birth: Helsinki, Finland
- Height: 1.65 m (5 ft 5 in)
- Position: Midfielder

Senior career*
Years	Team	Apps	(Gls)
2009–2010	HJK	43	(18)
2011	Malmö	14	(1)
2012	Djurgården	22	(0)
2013	Sunnanå	20	(1)
2014	Örebro	21	(0)
2015	Sunnanå	15	(3)
2016–2017	Djurgården	35	(0)

International career
2010–2017	Finland	84	(5)
- * Club domestic league appearances and goals

Annika Kukkonen (born 12 April 1990) is a Finnish former football midfielder.

== Career ==
Kukkonen previously played for HJK.

Kukkonen was announced at LdB FC Malmö.

On 28 March 2012, Kukkonen was announced at Djurgården.

Kukkonen was announced at Sunnanå SK.

Kukkonen left Sunnanå after their 2013 Damallsvenskan campaign ended in relegation. She joined Örebro in February 2014. During her time at Örebro, she was playing on painkillers for a long while due to an ankle injury.

On 10 February 2016, Kukkonen was announced at Djurgården.

On 30 November 2018, Kukkonen was announced at Djurgården's futsal team.

== International career ==
She has been a member of the Finnish national team since February 2010.

In June 2013 Kukkonen was named in national coach Andrée Jeglertz's Finland squad for UEFA Women's Euro 2013.

In September 2016, Kukkonen was called up to European qualifying matches against Slovenia and Scotland.

Kukkonen played in over 70 international matches.

== Coaching career ==
On 12 January 2018, Kukkonen was announced as a coach at Sunnanå.

On 17 November 2023, Kukkonen joined the Swedish Football Association as a national football trainer.
