= Mia Brogaard =

Danish footballer (born 1981)

Personal information
- Full name: Mia Birkehøj Brogaard
- Date of birth: 15 October 1981 (age 45)
- Height: 1.65 m (5 ft 5 in)
- Position: Defender

Youth career
- 1986–1993: Hellas
- 1994–1995: Vanløse IF

Senior career*
Years	Team	Apps	(Gls)
1996–1999	Hvidovre		
2000–2013	Brøndby	358	(74+)

International career
2002–2013	Denmark	76	(5)
- * Club domestic league appearances and goals

Mia Birkehøj Brogaard (née Olsen; born 15 October 1981) is a Danish former football defender. She played for the Denmark national team and A-Liga club Brøndby.

== Club career ==
As of September 2012, Brogaard held the all-time appearance record for Brøndby with 327 across all competitions. Malene Marquard is in second place with 247. Having begun her career as a forward, before moving back into defense, Brogaard had scored 74 goals for the club.

Brogaard took time out to have her son Villads in 2010. She returned to Brøndby in spring 2012 after playing some games with FC Damsø in 2011 to build up her fitness. In November 2013 Brogaard announced that she had retired from football.

- Statistics on Brøndby site
  - 253 games, 74 goals in National championships (Elitedivisionen) until September 9, 2012
  - 37 games, 3 goals in Danish Cup until September 9, 2012
  - 41 games, 4 goals in UEFA competitions
  - 327 games, 81 goals in all competitions until September 9, 2012

== International career ==
Brogaard made her debut for the senior Denmark national team on 15 August 2002, as a second-half substitute in a 4–0 friendly win over North Korea in Copenhagen. Eight days later she made her first competitive appearance in a 2–0 World Cup qualifying defeat to France at Stade Félix-Bollaert.

She did not play again until returning to the team in April 2005, but was then named in the squad for UEFA Women's Euro 2005. Brogaard kept her place for the 2007 FIFA World Cup in China and UEFA European Championship 2009 in Finland, as Denmark exited both competitions in the first round.

After the latter tournament Brogaard announced her retirement from international football, but she relented and returned for the 2010 Algarve Cup.

Ahead of UEFA European Championship 2013, Brogaard secured a place in the team at left back. She was named in national coach Kenneth Heiner-Møller's squad for the final tournament in Sweden. She scored Denmark's goal in their second group match, a 2–1 defeat to Italy. Denmark's goal in their final group match, a 1–1 draw with Finland, was also attributed to Brogaard after her shot was deflected in off Nora Heroum.
