= Alice Parisi =

Italian footballer (born 1990)

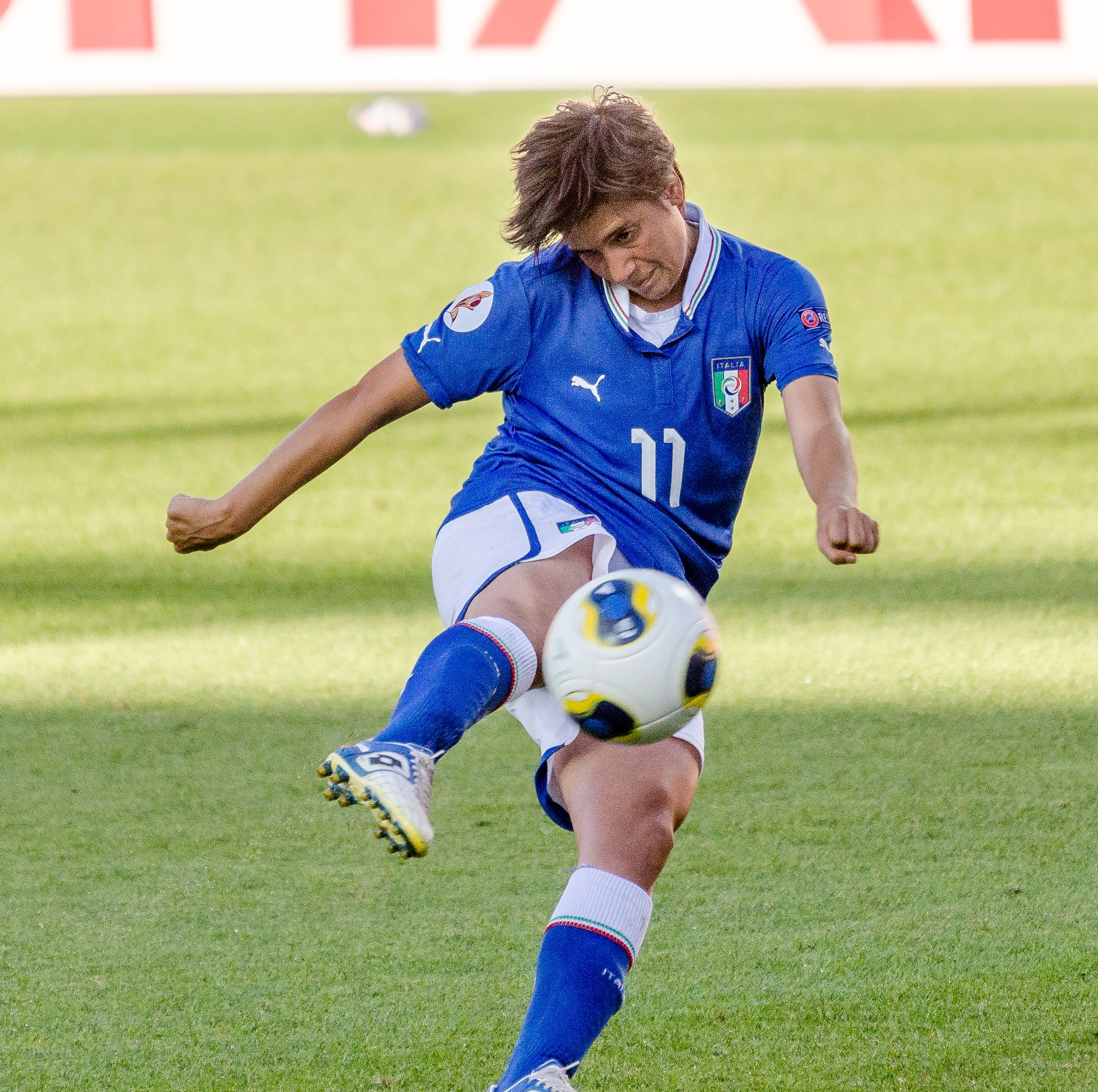
- Parisi playing the Quarter final of the UEFA Women's Euro 2013

Personal information
- Full name: Alice Parisi
- Date of birth: 11 December 1990 (age 35)
- Place of birth: Tione di Trento, Italy,
- Height: 1.67 m (5 ft 6 in)
- Position: Midfielder

Senior career*
Years	Team	Apps	(Gls)
2008	ACF Trento	21	(3)
2008–2010	ASD Bardolino	42	(15)
2010–2016	Tavagnacco	145	(80)
2016–2020	Fiorentina	36	(14)
2020–2022	Sassuolo	24	(1)
2022–2024	Fiorentina	38	(2)

International career
2007–2019	Italy	80	(10)
- * Club domestic league appearances and goals

Alice Parisi (born 11 December 1990) is an Italian former footballer who played as a midfielder. She previously played for ACF Trento, ASD Bardolino, ASD UPC Tavagnacco and Sassuolo.

== International career ==
She has been a member of the Italian national team. She played her first match with the senior team in July 2007 against Mexico. The following year she was a member of the Under-19 team that won 2008 U-19 European Championship, where she scored the decisive goal in the final.

She subsequently took part in the 2009 European Championship qualifying and final tournament. Consolidating her place in the team throughout the 2011 World Cup qualifying and began the 2013 European Championship qualifying as a starter.

Parisi was called up to the Italy squad for the 2019 FIFA Women's World Cup.

== Titles ==
- 2008 UEFA Women's Under-19 Championship
- 2 Serie A (2009, 2017)
- 4 Coppa Italia (2013, 2014, 2017, 2018)
- 2 Supercoppa Italiana (2008, 2018)
