= Giorgia Motta =

Italian footballer

Personal information
- Full name: Giorgia Motta
- Date of birth: 18 March 1984 (age 42)
- Place of birth: Verona, Italy
- Height: 1.69 m (5 ft 7 in)
- Position: Defender

Senior career*
| Years | Team | Apps | (Gls) |
| –2004 | Bardolino | | |
| 2004–2005 | Torrejón | | |
| 2005–2010 | Bardolino | 87 | (4) |
| 2010– | Torres | 38 | (1) |

International career
| 2007– | Italy | | |
- * Club domestic league appearances and goals

Giorgia Motta is an Italian football defender, was currently playing for Torres CF in Serie A. She has also played for Bardolino CF in Serie A and AD Torrejón in the Spanish Superleague. She has played the Champions League with Bardolino and Torres.

She is a member of the Italian national team, taking part in the 2009 European Championship's squad.
