= Daniela Stracchi =

Italian football midfielder (born 1983)

Personal information
- Full name: Daniela Stracchi
- Date of birth: September 2, 1983 (age 43)
- Place of birth: Italy
- Height: 1.60 m (5 ft 3 in)
- Position: Midfielder

Team information
- Current team: Atalanta Mozzanica
- Number: 20

Senior career*
Years	Team	Apps	(Gls)
2006–2008	ASD Fiammamonza 1970	251	(50)
2008–2014	ASD Torres Calcio	100	(9)
2014–	Atalanta Mozzanica	111	(9)

International career^{‡}
2001	Italy U-18	2	(1)
	Italy U-19	3	(0)
2011–	Italy	51	(2)
- * Club domestic league appearances and goals as of 07 August 2019 (UTC) ‡ National team caps and goals as of 25 July 2017

Daniela Stracchi (born 2 September 1983) is an Italian football midfielder who plays for Atalanta Mozzanica in the women's Serie A.

== Club career ==
She has played for ASD Fiammamonza 1970 and ASD Torres Calcio In July 2014 she signed an agreement with ASD Mozzanica, a club of homonymous town in the province of Bergamo, Lombardy.

== International career ==
She was called up to be part of the national team for the UEFA Women's Euro 2013.

Stracchi was called up to the Italy squad for the UEFA Women's Euro 2017.

== Honours ==
=== Club ===
ASD Fiammamonza

- Serie A: Winner 2005-06
- Italian Women's Super Cup: Winner 2005-06

ASD Torres Calcio

- Serie A: Winner 2009–10, 2010–11, 2011–12, 2012-13
- Italian Women's Super Cup: Winner 2008–09, 2009–10, 2010–11, 2011–12, 2012–13
- Italian Women's Cup: Winner 2010-11
