= Marie Hammarström =

Swedish footballer

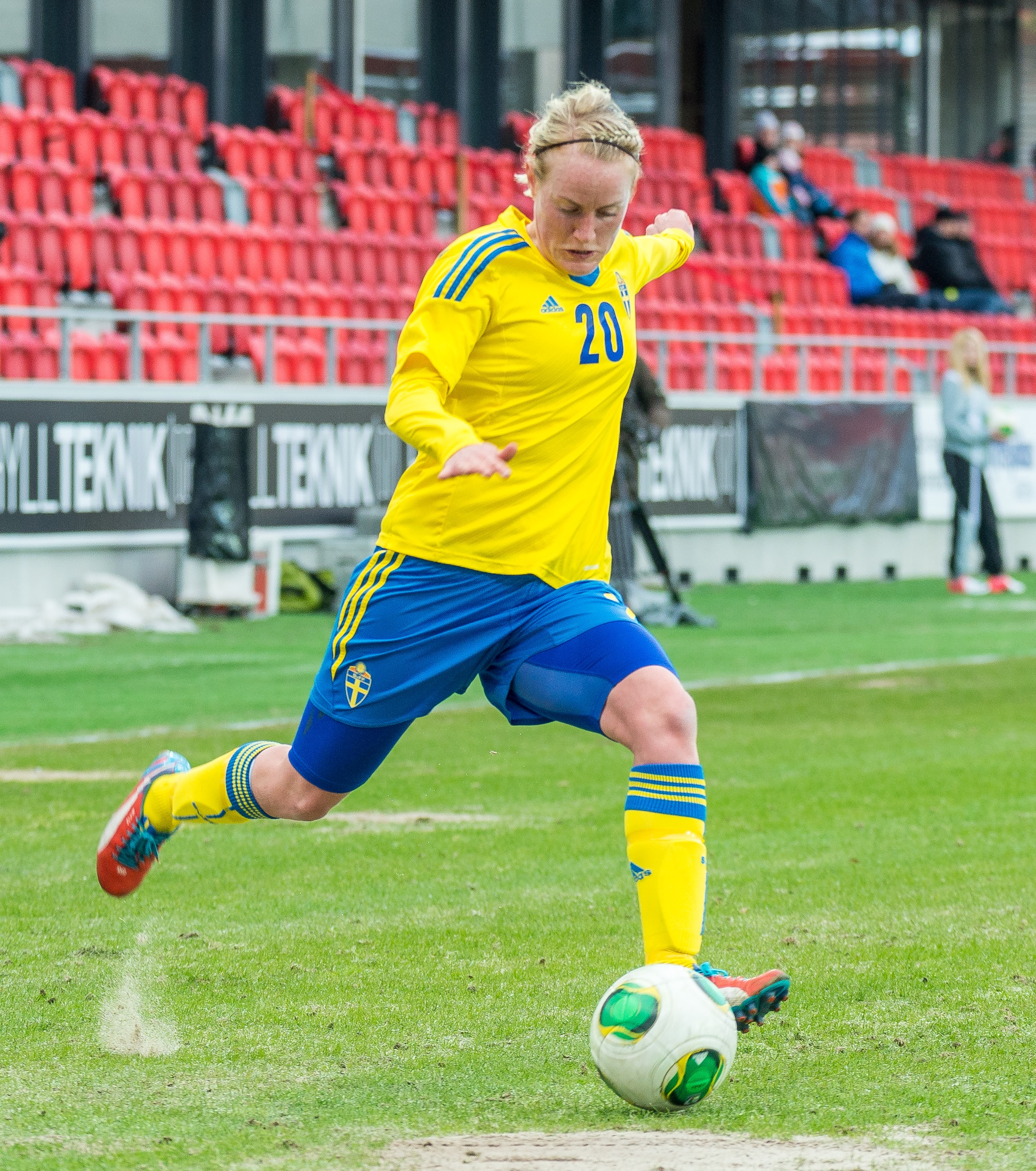
- Hammarström playing for Sweden against Iceland at Myresjöhus Arena, 6 April 2013

Personal information
- Full name: Ingegerd Marie Hammarström
- Date of birth: 29 March 1982 (age 44)
- Place of birth: Glanshammar, Sweden
- Height: 1.72 m (5 ft 8 in)
- Position: Midfielder

Youth career
- Glanshammars IF

Senior career*
| Years | Team | Apps | (Gls) |
| 1999–2003 | Karlsunds IF | | |
| 2004 | Umeå IK | | |
| 2004–2012 | KIF Örebro DFF | | |
| 2013 | Kopparbergs/Göteborg FC | 22 | (6) |
| 2015 | Rynninge IK | 2 | (0) |
| 2017 | KIF Örebro DFF | 2 | (0) |

International career
| 2008–2013 | Sweden | 43 | (5) |
Medal record
Women's football
Representing Sweden
FIFA Women's World Cup
| Bronze medal – third place | 2011 Germany | Team |
- * Club domestic league appearances and goals

Ingegerd Marie Hammarström (born 29 March 1982) is a Swedish former footballer who played as a midfielder. She has played for Damallsvenskan teams KIF Örebro DFF, Umeå IK and Kopparbergs/Göteborg FC. She represented the Sweden women's national football team at the 2011 FIFA Women's World Cup, and scored the decisive goal against France to give her team third place in the tournament. She is the twin sister of Kristin Hammarström. Hammarström scored a goal in the quarterfinal against Iceland during the UEFA Women's Euro 2013.

In November 2013 both sisters announced their immediate retirement from football. A year later, after the birth of her first child, Hammarström was reportedly in talks with Sweden coach Pia Sundhage about a playing comeback.

In the 2017 Damallsvenskan season, Hammarström registered as a player with KIF Örebro DFF and made herself available to cover for injuries to first team players.
