= Kenneth Heiner-Møller =

Danish footballer and manager (born 1971)

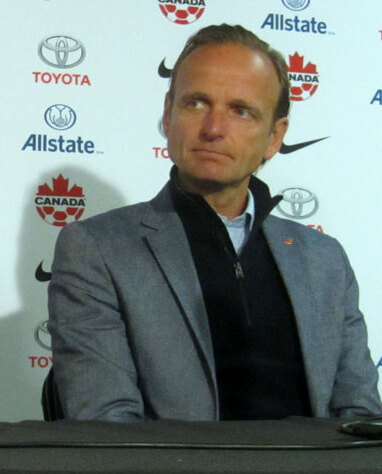
- Kenneth Heiner-Møller in 2019

Personal information
- Birth name: Kenneth Heiner Christiansen
- Date of birth: 17 January 1971 (age 55)
- Place of birth: Gentofte, Denmark
- Height: 1.80 m (5 ft 11 in)
- Position: Forward

Youth career
- 1977–1991: B 1903

Senior career*
Years	Team	Apps	(Gls)
1991–1994	Ølstykke FC		
1994–1995	Ferencvarosi TC	20	(2)
1995	Vejle	3	(0)
1996–1999	B93		
1999–2000	AGF	27	(3)
2000–2001	B93		

Managerial career
- 2002: B93 youth team
- 2003–2004: Lyngby youth team
- 2005: Brøndby women
- 2006–2013: Denmark women
- 2015–2017: Canada women (assistant)
- 2018–2020: Canada women
- * Club domestic league appearances and goals

Kenneth Heiner-Møller (born Kenneth Heiner Christiansen; 17 January 1971) is a Danish football manager and former player. He is the former manager of the Canadian women's national team. In 1994–1995 he played for Ferencvárosi TC in Hungary, where fans know him as Kenneth Christiansen.

== Career ==
Aged 30, Heiner-Møller broke his leg and had to finish his career as a footballer.

He coached the Danish women's national team from 2006 until 2013, when he stood down to take over as chief executive of Team Danmark.

At the 2007 FIFA Women's World Cup, Heiner-Møller and Danish players accused the Chinese hosts of harassment and covert surveillance prior to China's first-round match against Denmark. China's Swedish coach Marika Domanski-Lyfors and her assistant Pia Sundhage were unaware of the incidents and Heiner-Møller absolved them of any blame, although he refused to shake hands after the match.

On 8 January 2018, he was named head coach of the Canada women's national team to replace John Herdman who was appointed Canada men's national team head coach. On June 10, 2020, he stepped down from that job to take a position in his native country as head of coach education for the Danish Football Association.

== Personal life ==
Born Kenneth Heiner Christiansen, Heiner-Møller married Anja Heiner-Møller, taking his wife's maiden name Møller upon their marriage.
