= Andrée Jeglertz =

Swedish footballer and manager

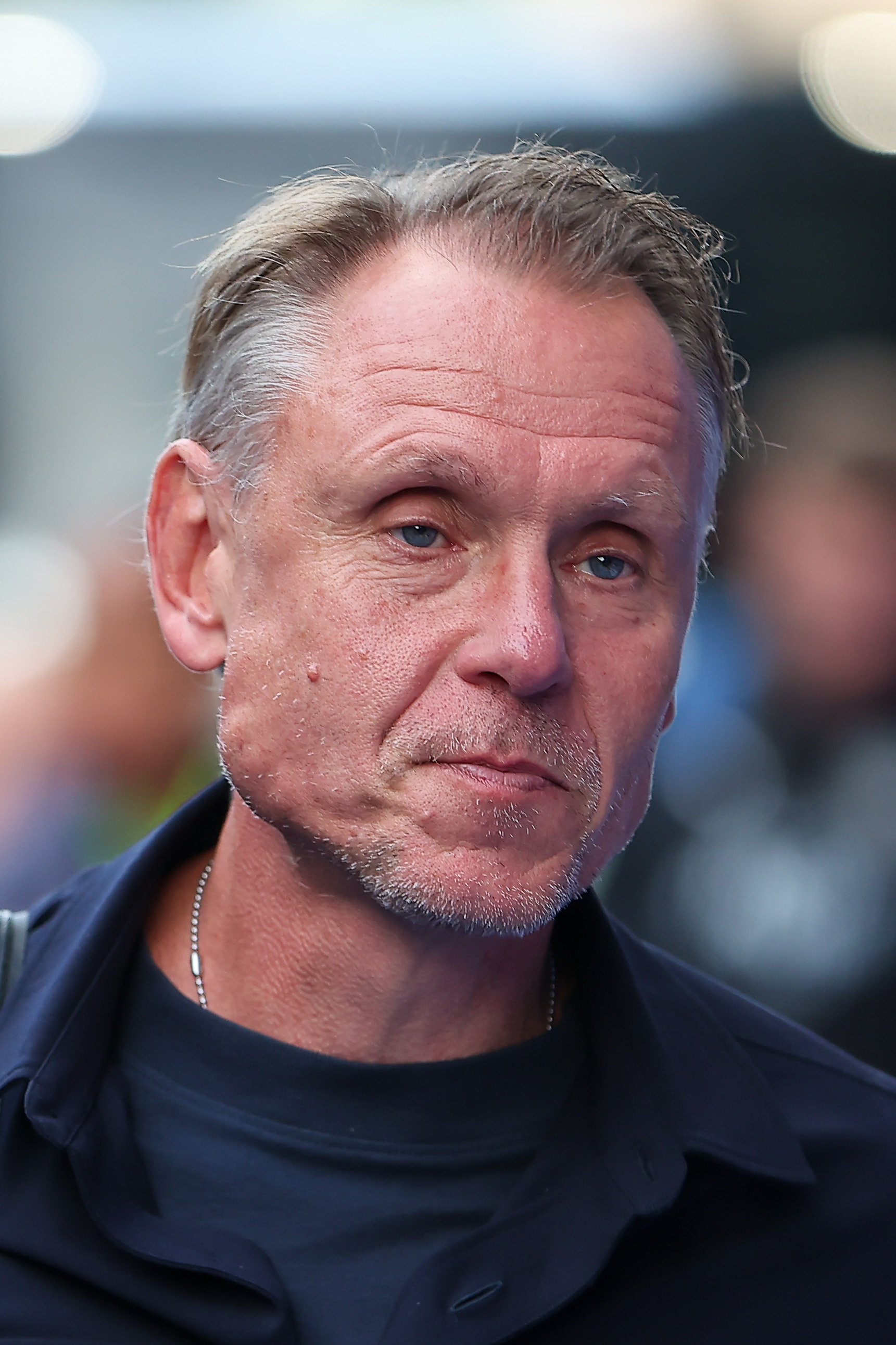
- Jeglertz in 2025

Personal information
- Full name: Andrée Alexander Jeglertz
- Date of birth: 14 February 1972 (age 54)
- Place of birth: Malmö, Sweden
- Position: Defender

Team information
- Current team: Manchester City women (manager)

Youth career
- 1985–1990: Malmö FF

Senior career*
Years	Team	Apps	(Gls)
1991–1992	Malmö FF	25	(3)
1991	→ IFK Trelleborg (loan)		
1993–1996	Umeå FC	83	(1)
1997–1999	IFK Hässleholm	67	(11)
2000–2001	Gimonäs CK		
2002	Umeå FC		
2003–2004	Gimonäs CK		

International career
1992	Sweden U21	3	(1)

Managerial career
- 2003–2004: Gimonäs CK (player-coach)
- 2004–2008: Umeå IK
- 2009: Djurgårdens IF
- 2010–2016: Finland Women
- 2017–2018: Umeå FC
- 2021–2023: Linköpings FC
- 2023–2025: Denmark Women
- 2025–: Manchester City Women
- * Club domestic league appearances and goals

Andrée Alexander Jeglertz (born 14 February 1972) is a Swedish football coach and former professional player who is currently the manager of Women's Super League club Manchester City.

== Playing career ==
A defender, Jeglertz played 25 games in the Allsvenskan for Malmö FF and also played club football for IFK Trelleborg, Umeå FC, IFK Hässleholm and Gimonäs CK. He earned three caps and scored one goal for the Swedish U21 team in 1992.

== Coaching career ==
Jeglertz moved from Umeå IK to Djurgårdens IF for the 2009 season, having previously also coached Gimonäs CK for one season. While at Umeå, Jeglertz won the Damallsvenskan Manager of the Year award twice, and won the UEFA Women's Champions League in 2004. He was awarded the Finnish Football Manager of the Year in 2012. In November 2020 Jeglertz agreed to return to domestic women's football as the head coach of Linköpings FC.

=== Denmark Women ===
Ahead of the 2023 FIFA Women's World Cup, Lars Søndergaard announced he would step down from his role in charge of the Denmark women's national team once the event concluded. In preparation for Søndergaard's departure, the Danish Football Association announced on 7 June 2023 that Jeglertz would take over following the tournament. Jeglertz's first game in charge did not come until 22 September, with a 2–0 group victory over Germany in the UEFA Women's Nations League. Despite four wins of their six games in the tournament, Denmark failed to advance with a second place finish within the group. Their finish also guaranteed that they would not partake in the 2024 Paris Olympics.

In April 2024, Denmark beat Czech Republic 3–1 to begin their UEFA Women's Euro 2025 qualifying. Despite another second place finish, Jeglertz's squad qualified for the UEFA Women's Euro 2025 tournament, finishing three points behind 2023 World Cup winner Spain. With the expiry of his contract with the Danish Football Association approaching on the two-year anniversary of taking charge and Denmark struggling in the 2025 UEFA Women's Nations League, Jeglertz was uncertain of his future with the national team. Despite conversations with Jeglertz, Danish football director Peter Møller confirmed the following day that nothing had been confirmed between the two parties. On 3 June, Møller confirmed Jeglertz's tenure as head coach of Denmark would end at the conclusion of the 2025 Women's Euro tournament with Jakob Michelsen set to take over. Denmark struggled in the Euros and failed to secure a point from any of their three group matches. With the results, Jeglertz's final match in charge of Denmark was a 3–2 loss to Poland on 12 July.

=== Manchester City Women ===
On 3 July 2025, it was announced that Jeglertz had been appointed as head coach for English WSL club Manchester City, joining the team following the conclusion of Denmark's Euro 2025 campaign. Under his leadership, City won 13 of their opening 14 games in the 2025–26 WSL season. In his first season in charge, he led Manchester City to their first Women's Super League title in a decade.

== Career statistics ==
As of match played 22 November 2026

Managerial record by team and tenure
Team	From	To	Record					Ref
Team	From	To	G	W	D	L	Win %	Ref
Denmark women	7 June 2023	23 July 2025	25	13	1	11	52.00	
Manchester City Women	23 July 2025	Present	48	36	6	6	75.00	
Career total			73	49	7	17	67.12	

== Honours ==
=== Manager ===
Umeå IK

- UEFA Women's Cup: 2003–04
- Damallsvenskan: 2005, 2006, 2007, 2008
- Svenska Cupen: 2007
- Svenska Supercupen: 2007, 2008

Manchester City Women

- Women's Super League: 2025–26
- Women's FA Cup: 2025–26

=== Individual ===
- Damallsvenskan Coach of the Year: 2005, 2006, 2007, 2008, 2022
- Finnish Football Manager of the Year: 2012
