= 2016 Cyprus Women's Cup squads =

List of players competing at the 9th edition of the Cyprus Women's Cup

This article lists the squads for the 2016 Cyprus Women's Cup, the 9th edition of the Cyprus Women's Cup. The cup consisted of a series of friendly games, and was held in Cyprus from 2 to 9 March 2016. The eight national teams involved in the tournament registered a squad of 23 players.

The age listed for each player is on 2 March 2016, the first day of the tournament. The numbers of caps and goals listed for each player do not include any matches played after the start of tournament. The club listed is the club for which the player last played a competitive match prior to the tournament. The nationality for each club reflects the national association (not the league) to which the club is affiliated. A flag is included for coaches that are of a different nationality than their own national team.

== Group A ==
=== Austria ===
Coach: Dominik Thalhammer

The squad was announced on 12 February 2016.

No.	Pos.	Player	Date of birth (age)	Club
	GK	Jasmin Pal	24 August 1996 (aged 19)	(Austrian Football Association) Wacker Innsbruck
	GK	Manuela Zinsberger	19 October 1995 (aged 20)	(German Football Association) Bayern Munich
	DF	Verena Aschauer	20 January 1994 (aged 22)	(German Football Association) SC Freiburg
	DF	Virginia Kirchberger	25 May 1993 (aged 22)	(German Football Association) 1. FC Köln
	DF	Katharina Schiechtl	27 February 1993 (aged 23)	(German Football Association) Werder Bremen
	DF	Elisabeth Tieber	4 July 1990 (aged 25)	(Swiss Football Association) Neunkirch
	MF	Barbara Dunst	25 September 1997 (aged 18)	(Austrian Football Association) St. Pölten
	MF	Jasmin Eder	8 October 1992 (aged 23)	(Austrian Football Association) St. Pölten
	MF	Laura Feiersinger	5 April 1993 (aged 22)	(German Football Association) Bayern Munich
	MF	Sophie Maierhofer	9 August 1996 (aged 19)	(German Football Association) Werder Bremen
	MF	Jennifer Pöltl	4 August 1993 (aged 22)	(Austrian Football Association) St. Pölten
	MF	Nadine Prohaska	15 August 1990 (aged 25)	(Austrian Football Association) St. Pölten
	MF	Sarah Puntigam	13 October 1992 (aged 23)	(German Football Association) SC Freiburg
	MF	Viktoria Schnaderbeck	4 January 1991 (aged 25)	(German Football Association) Bayern Munich
	MF	Carina Wenninger	6 February 1991 (aged 25)	(German Football Association) Bayern Munich
	MF	Sarah Zadrazil	19 February 1993 (aged 23)	(United States Soccer Federation) East Tennessee State Buccaneers
	FW	Nicole Billa	5 March 1996 (aged 19)	(German Football Association) TSG 1899 Hoffenheim
	FW	Nina Burger	27 December 1987 (aged 28)	(German Football Association) SC Sand
	FW	Stefanie Enzinger	25 November 1990 (aged 25)	(Austrian Football Association) Sturm Graz
	FW	Simona Koren	28 March 1993 (aged 22)	(United States Soccer Federation) East Tennessee State Buccaneers

=== Hungary ===
Coach: Edina Markó

The squad was announced on 25 February 2016.

No.	Pos.	Player	Date of birth (age)	Club
	GK	Barbara Bíró	11 May 1995 (aged 20)	(Hungarian Football Federation) Viktória
	GK	Réka Szőcs	19 November 1989 (aged 26)	(Swiss Football Association) Basel
	DF	Evelin Mosdóczi	26 October 1994 (aged 21)	(Hungarian Football Federation) Ferencváros
	DF	Dóra Papp	5 January 1991 (aged 25)	(Hungarian Football Federation) MTK Hungária
	DF	Viktória Szabó	26 May 1997 (aged 18)	(German Football Association) 1. FC Lübars
	DF	Szilvia Szeitl	26 April 1987 (aged 28)	(Hungarian Football Federation) Femina
	DF	Szabina Tálosi	20 January 1989 (aged 27)	(Austrian Football Association) Südburgenland
	DF	Alexandra Tóth	29 January 1991 (aged 25)	(Austrian Football Association) Südburgenland
	DF	Gabriella Tóth	16 December 1986 (aged 29)	(German Football Association) Werder Bremen
	MF	Henrietta Csiszár	15 May 1994 (aged 21)	(German Football Association) 1. FC Lübars
	MF	Evelin Fenyvesi	7 November 1996 (aged 19)	(Hungarian Football Federation) Ferencváros
	MF	Angéla Smuczer	11 February 1982 (aged 34)	(Hungarian Football Federation) MTK Hungária
	MF	Zsanett Jakabfi	18 February 1990 (aged 26)	(German Football Association) VfL Wolfsburg
	MF	Lilla Nagy	18 December 1989 (aged 26)	(Hungarian Football Federation) MTK Hungária
	MF	Alexandra Szarvas	7 September 1992 (aged 23)	(Swiss Football Association) Basel
	MF	Erika Szuh	21 February 1990 (aged 26)	(German Football Association) 1. FC Lübars
	FW	Lilla Sipos	14 July 1992 (aged 23)	(Austrian Football Association) St. Pölten
	FW	Fanny Vágó	23 July 1991 (aged 24)	(Austrian Football Association) St. Pölten
	FW	Bernadett Zágor	31 January 1990 (aged 26)	(Hungarian Football Federation) Ferencváros
	FW	Dóra Zeller	6 January 1995 (aged 21)	(German Football Association) TSG 1899 Hoffenheim

=== Ireland ===
Coach: Susan Ronan

The squad was announced on 26 February 2016.

No.	Pos.	Player	Date of birth (age)	Club
	GK	Emma Byrne	14 June 1979 (aged 36)	(The Football Association) Arsenal
	GK	Grace Moloney	1 March 1993 (aged 23)	(The Football Association) Reading
	GK	Niamh Reid Burke	6 August 1991 (aged 24)	(Football Association of Ireland) Shelbourne
	DF	Megan Campbell	28 June 1993 (aged 22)	(The Football Association) Manchester City
	DF	Méabh De Búrca	11 August 1988 (aged 27)	(Football Association of Ireland) Galway
	DF	Niamh Fahey	13 October 1987 (aged 28)	(The Football Association) Chelsea
	DF	Jessica Gleeson	23 October 1993 (aged 22)	(Football Association of Ireland) Wexford Youths
	DF	Savannah McCarthy	26 March 1997 (aged 18)	(Scottish Football Association) Glasgow City
	DF	Sophie Perry	11 November 1986 (aged 29)	(The Football Association) Brighton & Hove Albion
	DF	Louise Quinn	17 June 1990 (aged 25)	(Swedish Football Association) Eskilstuna United
	MF	Diane Caldwell	11 September 1988 (aged 27)	(German Football Association) 1. FC Köln
	MF	Megan Connolly	7 March 1997 (aged 18)	(United States Soccer Federation) Florida State Seminoles
	MF	Karen Duggan	29 May 1991 (aged 24)	(Football Association of Ireland) UCD Waves
	MF	Rachel Graham	18 July 1989 (aged 26)	(Football Association of Ireland) Shelbourne
	MF	Emma Hansberry	26 May 1994 (aged 21)	(Football Association of Ireland) Wexford Youths
	MF	Ruesha Littlejohn	3 July 1990 (aged 25)	(Scottish Football Association) Glasgow City
	MF	Katie McCabe	21 September 1995 (aged 20)	(The Football Association) Arsenal
	MF	Denise O'Sullivan	4 February 1994 (aged 22)	(Scottish Football Association) Glasgow City
	MF	Julie-Ann Russell	28 March 1991 (aged 24)	(Football Association of Ireland) UCD Waves
	FW	Rianna Jarrett	5 July 1994 (aged 21)	(Football Association of Ireland) Wexford Youths
	FW	Áine O'Gorman	13 May 1989 (aged 26)	(Football Association of Ireland) UCD Waves
	FW	Clare Shine	18 May 1995 (aged 20)	(Scottish Football Association) Glasgow City

=== Italy ===
Coach: Antonio Cabrini

The squad was announced on 22 February 2016. Sara Gama was replaced by Eleonora Piacezzi.

No.	Pos.	Player	Date of birth (age)	Club
	GK	Laura Giuliani	5 June 1993 (aged 22)	(German Football Association) 1. FC Köln
	GK	Katja Schroffenegger	28 April 1991 (aged 24)	(Italian Football Federation) Südtirol Bolzano
	GK	Sabrina Tasselli	3 April 1990 (aged 25)	(Italian Football Federation) Riviera di Romagna
	DF	Elisa Bartoli	7 May 1991 (aged 24)	(Italian Football Federation) Mozzanica
	DF	Federica Di Criscio	12 May 1993 (aged 22)	(Italian Football Federation) Verona
	DF	Aurora Galli	13 December 1996 (aged 19)	(Italian Football Federation) Mozzanica
	DF	Elena Linari	15 April 1994 (aged 21)	(Italian Football Federation) Brescia
	DF	Raffaella Manieri	26 November 1986 (aged 29)	(German Football Association) Bayern Munich
	DF	Eleonora Piacezzi	9 November 1995 (aged 20)	(Italian Football Federation) Atletico Oristano
	DF	Linda Tucceri Cimini	4 April 1991 (aged 24)	(Italian Football Federation) San Zaccaria
	MF	Barbara Bonansea	13 June 1991 (aged 24)	(Italian Football Federation) Brescia
	MF	Patrizia Caccamo	12 March 1984 (aged 31)	(Italian Football Federation) Fiorentina
	MF	Marta Carissimi	3 May 1987 (aged 28)	(Italian Football Federation) Verona
	MF	Alia Guagni	1 October 1987 (aged 28)	(Italian Football Federation) Fiorentina
	MF	Alice Parisi	11 December 1990 (aged 25)	(Italian Football Federation) Tavagnacco
	MF	Azzurra Principi	13 May 1992 (aged 23)	(Italian Football Federation) San Zaccaria
	MF	Martina Rosucci	9 May 1992 (aged 23)	(Italian Football Federation) Brescia
	MF	Daniela Stracchi	2 September 1983 (aged 32)	(Italian Football Federation) Mozzanica
	FW	Melania Gabbiadini	28 August 1983 (aged 32)	(Italian Football Federation) Verona
	FW	Valentina Giacinti	2 January 1994 (aged 22)	(Italian Football Federation) Mozzanica
	FW	Cristiana Girelli	23 April 1990 (aged 25)	(Italian Football Federation) Brescia
	FW	Luisa Pugnali	20 March 1994 (aged 21)	(Italian Football Federation) San Zaccaria
	FW	Daniela Sabatino	26 June 1985 (aged 30)	(Italian Football Federation) Brescia

== Group B ==
=== Czech Republic ===
Coach: Stanislav Krejčík

The squad was announced on 19 February 2016. On 28 February 2016, Adéla Odehnalová was replaced by Tereza Koubová.

No.	Pos.	Player	Date of birth (age)	Caps	Goals	Club
	GK	Radka Bednaříková	18 December 1990 (aged 25)	16	0	(Football Association of the Czech Republic) Slovácko
	GK	Sára Vršatová	6 January 1996 (aged 20)	7	0	(Football Association of the Czech Republic) Sparta Prague
	DF	Petra Bertholdová	24 November 1984 (aged 31)	52	2	(Football Association of the Czech Republic) Sparta Prague
	DF	Anna Dlasková	6 October 1995 (aged 20)	1	0	(Football Association of the Czech Republic) Sparta Prague
	DF	Kristýna Janků	18 July 1994 (aged 21)	9	0	(Football Association of the Czech Republic) Slovácko
	DF	Jana Sedláčková	21 January 1993 (aged 23)	26	2	(German Football Association) USV Jena
	DF	Nikola Sedláčková	6 September 1990 (aged 25)	13	0	(Football Association of the Czech Republic) Slovácko
	DF	Petra Vyštejnová	12 November 1990 (aged 25)	46	0	(Football Association of the Czech Republic) Sparta Prague
	MF	Eva Bartoňová	17 October 1993 (aged 22)	29	1	(Football Association of the Czech Republic) Sparta Prague
	MF	Kateřina Bužková	19 March 1996 (aged 19)	1	0	(Football Association of the Czech Republic) Sparta Prague
	MF	Klára Cahynová	20 December 1993 (aged 22)	33	2	(Football Association of the Czech Republic) Slavia Prague
	MF	Jitka Chlastáková	13 October 1993 (aged 22)	21	2	(Football Association of the Czech Republic) Slavia Prague
	MF	Markéta Ringelová	25 July 1989 (aged 26)	23	3	(Football Association of the Czech Republic) Sparta Prague
	MF	Kateřina Svitková	20 March 1996 (aged 19)	16	8	(Football Association of the Czech Republic) Slavia Prague
	MF	Tereza Koubová	4 May 1992 (aged 23)	0	0	(Football Association of the Czech Republic) Bohemians Prague
	FW	Petra Ivaničová	8 September 1993 (aged 22)	8	2	(Football Association of the Czech Republic) Sparta Prague
	FW	Lucie Martínková	19 September 1986 (aged 29)	69	16	(Football Association of the Czech Republic) Sparta Prague
	FW	Gabriela Matoušková	9 August 1992 (aged 23)	10	2	(Football Association of the Czech Republic) Sparta Prague
	FW	Simona Necidová	20 January 1994 (aged 22)	15	1	(Football Association of the Czech Republic) Slavia Prague
	FW	Lucie Voňková	28 February 1992 (aged 24)	33	7	(German Football Association) Bayern Munich

=== Finland ===
Coach: (Sweden) Andrée Jeglertz

The squad was announced on 18 February 2016.

No.	Pos.	Player	Date of birth (age)	Club
	GK	Tinja-Riikka Korpela	5 May 1986 (aged 29)	(German Football Association) Bayern Munich
	GK	Minna Meriluoto	4 October 1985 (aged 30)	(Football Association of Finland) HJK
	GK	Siiri Välimaa	10 April 1990 (aged 25)	(Norwegian Football Federation) Kolbotn
	DF	Tuija Hyyrynen	10 March 1988 (aged 27)	(Danish Football Association) Fortuna Hjørring
	DF	Elina Myllymäki	22 November 1990 (aged 25)	(Football Association of Finland) Ilves
	DF	Katarina Naumanen	24 July 1995 (aged 20)	(United States Soccer Federation) UCF Knights
	DF	Maija Saari	26 March 1986 (aged 29)	(Norwegian Football Federation) Stabæk
	DF	Anna Westerlund	9 April 1989 (aged 26)	(Norwegian Football Federation) Lillestrøm
	MF	Emmi Alanen	30 April 1991 (aged 24)	(Swedish Football Association) Vittsjö
	MF	Jenny Danielsson	30 August 1994 (aged 21)	(Swedish Football Association) Kristianstads
	MF	Nora Heroum	20 July 1994 (aged 21)	(Danish Football Association) Fortuna Hjørring
	MF	Emma Koivisto	25 September 1994 (aged 21)	(United States Soccer Federation) Florida State Seminoles
	MF	Natalia Kuikka	1 December 1995 (aged 20)	(United States Soccer Federation) Florida State Seminoles
	MF	Annika Kukkonen	12 April 1990 (aged 25)	(Swedish Football Association) Djurgården
	MF	Ria Öling	15 September 1994 (aged 21)	(Football Association of Finland) TPS
	MF	Iina Salmi	12 October 1994 (aged 21)	(Swedish Football Association) Rosengård
	MF	Julia Tunturi	25 April 1996 (aged 19)	(Football Association of Finland) Åland United
	FW	Adelina Engman	11 October 1994 (aged 21)	(Swedish Football Association) Kopparbergs/Göteborg
	FW	Juliette Kemppi	14 May 1994 (aged 21)	(Norwegian Football Federation) Kolbotn
	FW	Linda Ruutu	17 February 1990 (aged 26)	(Football Association of Finland) HJK
	FW	Sanna Saarinen	4 September 1991 (aged 24)	(Football Association of Finland) PK-35 Vantaa
	FW	Linda Sällström	13 July 1988 (aged 27)	(Swedish Football Association) Vittsjö

=== Poland ===
Coach: Wojciech Basiuk

The squad was announced on 15 February 2016.

No.	Pos.	Player	Date of birth (age)	Club
	GK	Daria Antończyk	7 December 1983 (aged 32)	(Polish Football Association) Wałbrzych
	GK	Anna Szymańska	5 December 1988 (aged 27)	(Polish Football Association) Medyk Konin
	DF	Paulina Dudek	16 June 1997 (aged 18)	(Polish Football Association) Medyk Konin
	DF	Agata Guściora	6 October 1994 (aged 21)	(Polish Football Association) Górnik Łęczna
	DF	Marta Mika	8 July 1983 (aged 32)	(German Football Association) Hohen Neuendorf
	DF	Aleksandra Sikora	7 February 1991 (aged 25)	(Polish Football Association) Medyk Konin
	DF	Jolanta Siwińska	2 April 1991 (aged 24)	(German Football Association) Turbine Potsdam
	DF	Martyna Wiankowska	24 December 1996 (aged 19)	(Polish Football Association) Łódź
	MF	Patrycja Balcerzak	1 January 1994 (aged 22)	(Polish Football Association) Medyk Konin
	MF	Natalia Chudzik	8 August 1989 (aged 26)	(Polish Football Association) Medyk Konin
	MF	Katarzyna Daleszczyk	23 March 1990 (aged 25)	(Polish Football Association) Medyk Konin
	MF	Dominika Grabowska	26 December 1998 (aged 17)	(Polish Football Association) Wrocław
	MF	Ewelina Kamczyk	22 February 1996 (aged 20)	(Polish Football Association) Górnik Łęczna
	MF	Hanna Konsek	21 January 1987 (aged 29)	(German Football Association) Hohen Neuendorf
	MF	Sylwia Matysik	20 May 1997 (aged 18)	(Polish Football Association) Wrocław
	MF	Natalia Pakulska	27 November 1991 (aged 24)	(Polish Football Association) Medyk Konin
	FW	Silvana Chojnowski	17 April 1994 (aged 21)	(German Football Association) TSG 1899 Hoffenheim
	FW	Nikol Kaletka	6 February 1995 (aged 21)	(Polish Football Association) Czarni Sosnowiec
	FW	Evelyn Niciński	14 January 1993 (aged 23)	(German Football Association) 1. FC Lübars
	FW	Ewa Pajor	3 December 1996 (aged 19)	(German Football Association) VfL Wolfsburg

=== Wales ===
Coach: Jayne Ludlow

The squad was announced on 18 February 2016.

No.	Pos.	Player	Date of birth (age)	Club
	GK	Laura O'Sullivan	23 August 1991 (aged 24)	(Football Association of Wales) Cardiff City
	GK	Jo Price	7 June 1985 (aged 30)	(Football Association of Wales) Newcastle Emlyn
	DF	Nicola Cousins	22 October 1988 (aged 27)	(The Football Association) Yeovil Town
	DF	Loren Dykes	5 February 1988 (aged 28)	(The Football Association) Bristol City
	DF	Sophie Ingle	2 September 1991 (aged 24)	(The Football Association) Liverpool
	DF	Shaunna Jenkins	27 August 1999 (aged 16)	(Football Association of Wales) Cwmbran Celtic
	DF	Nia Jones	6 April 1992 (aged 23)	(The Football Association) Reading
	DF	Hayley Ladd	6 October 1993 (aged 22)	(The Football Association) Bristol City
	DF	Amelia Ritchie	9 May 1999 (aged 16)	(The Football Association) Brighton & Hove Albion
	DF	Rhiannon Roberts	30 August 1990 (aged 25)	(The Football Association) Doncaster Rovers Belles
	MF	Ellie Curson	18 February 1994 (aged 22)	(The Football Association) Yeovil Town
	MF	Charlie Estcourt	27 May 1998 (aged 17)	(The Football Association) Reading
	MF	Jess Fishlock	14 January 1987 (aged 29)	(United States Soccer Federation) Seattle Reign
	MF	Angharad James	1 June 1994 (aged 21)	(The Football Association) Bristol City
	MF	Laura May Walkley	16 May 1991 (aged 24)	(The Football Association) Reading
	FW	Chloe Chivers	29 April 1999 (aged 16)	(Football Association of Wales) Cwmbran Celtic
	FW	Kayleigh Green	22 March 1988 (aged 27)	(Football Association of Wales) Cardiff City
	FW	Natasha Harding	2 March 1989 (aged 27)	(The Football Association) Liverpool
	FW	Nadia Lawrence	29 November 1989 (aged 26)	(The Football Association) Yeovil Town
	FW	Chloe O'Connor	13 December 1994 (aged 21)	(Football Association of Wales) Cardiff Met.
	FW	Rachel Rowe	13 September 1992 (aged 23)	(The Football Association) Reading
	FW	Helen Ward	26 April 1986 (aged 29)	(The Football Association) Reading

== Player representation ==
Statistics are per the beginning of the competition.

=== By club ===
Clubs with 4 or more players represented are listed.

Players	Club
10	(Czech Republic) Sparta Prague
7	(Germany) Bayern Munich, (Poland) Medyk Konin
6	(Austria) St. Pölten, (England) Reading
5	(Italy) Brescia
4	(Czech Republic) Slavia Prague, (Germany) Lübars, (Italy) Mozzanica, (Scotland) Glasgow City

=== By club nationality ===
Players	Clubs
29	Germany
21	England, Italy
18	Czech Republic
14	Poland
10	Austria
9	(Republic of Ireland) Ireland
8	Hungary
7	Sweden, United States
6	Finland, Wales
4	Norway, Scotland
3	Switzerland
2	Denmark

=== By club federation ===
Players	Federation
162	UEFA
7	CONCACAF

=== By representatives of domestic league ===
National squad	Players
Italy	21
Czech Republic	18
Poland	14
Republic of Ireland	9
Hungary	8
Austria	6
Finland	6
Wales	6
