= 2015 FIFA Women's World Cup qualification – UEFA Group 7 =

Football tournament qualification stage

The 2015 FIFA Women's World Cup qualification UEFA Group 7 was a UEFA qualifying group for the 2015 FIFA Women's World Cup. The group comprised Austria, Bulgaria, Finland, France, Hungary and Kazakhstan.

The group winners qualified directly for the 2015 FIFA Women's World Cup. Among the seven group runners-up, the four best (determined by records against the first-, third-, fourth- and fifth-placed teams only for balance between different groups) advanced to the play-offs.

== Standings ==
Pos	Team	Pld	W	D	L	GF	GA	GD	Pts	Qualification	France	Austria	Finland	Hungary	Kazakhstan	Bulgaria
1	France	10	10	0	0	54	3	+51	30	Women's World Cup	—	3–1	3–1	4–0	7–0	14–0
2	Austria	10	7	0	3	31	14	+17	21 (Note: Austria scored more head-to-head goals than Finland)		1–3	—	3–1	4–3	5–1	4–0
3	Finland	10	7	0	3	27	9	+18	21		0–2	2–1	—	4–0	1–0	4–0
4	Hungary	10	4	0	6	20	25	−5	12		0–4	0–3	0–4	—	4–1	4–0
5	Kazakhstan	10	1	1	8	8	30	−22	4		0–4	0–3	0–2	1−2	—	4–1
6	Bulgaria	10	0	1	9	3	62	−59	1		0–10	1–6	0–8	0–7	1–1	—

Source: UEFA
Rules for classification: Tiebreakers

== Results ==
All times are CEST (UTC+02:00) during summer and CET (UTC+01:00) during winter.

21 September 2013
12:00

Kazakhstan	0–2	Finland
	Report	Kukkonen 69'; Talonen 85'

Kazhimukan Munaitpasov Stadium, Astana
Attendance: 350
Referee: Eleni Lampadariou (Greece)
21 September 2013
18:30

Austria	4–0	Bulgaria
Burger 33'; Feiersinger 81'; Boycheva 90' (o.g.); Pöltl 90+1'	Report

Voralpenstadion, Vöcklabruck
Attendance: 1,000
Referee: Simona Ghisletta (Switzerland)

25 September 2013
12:00

Kazakhstan	0–4	France
	Report	Delie 15'; Thiney 17', 37'; Delannoy 21'

Kazhimukan Munaitpasov Stadium, Astana
Attendance: 100
Referee: Zuzana Kováčová (Slovakia)
25 September 2013
17:00

Finland	2–1	Austria
Engman 42'; Alanen 86'	Report	Burger 79'

Veritas Stadion, Turku
Attendance: 1,415
Referee: Anastasia Pustovoitova (Russia)

26 October 2013
14:30

Bulgaria	1–1	Kazakhstan
Kireva 43'	Report	Radoyska 26' (o.g.)

Lovech Stadium, Lovech
Attendance: 100
Referee: Gordana Kuzmanović (Serbia)
26 October 2013
17:00

Hungary	0–3	Austria
	Report	Wenninger 7'; Demeter 35' (o.g.); Makas 55'

Bozsik Stadion, Budapest
Attendance: 443
Referee: Morag Pirie (Scotland)

31 October 2013
17:00

Hungary	4–0	Bulgaria
B. Szabó 4'; Vágó 40' (pen.); Sipos 70'; Zeller 76'	Report

Bozsik Stadion, Budapest
Attendance: 300
Referee: Linn Andersson (Sweden)
31 October 2013
17:00

Finland	1–0	Kazakhstan
Sjölund 40'	Report

Sonera Stadium, Helsinki
Attendance: 1,557
Referee: Sjoukje de Jong (Netherlands)
31 October 2013
18:00

Austria	1–3	France
Wenninger 65'	Report	Nécib 16'; Henry 18'; Renard 61'

Sonnensee Stadion, Ritzing
Attendance: 550
Referee: Monika Mularczyk (Poland)

23 November 2013
15:00

Hungary	4–1	Kazakhstan
Jakabfi 50'; Kaján 54'; Zeller 56'; Vágó 64'	Report	Kirgizbaeva 36'

ETO Park, Győr
Attendance: 130
Referee: Marte Sørø (Norway)
23 November 2013
18:00

Bulgaria	0–10	France
	Report	Delie 2', 6', 10'; Thiney 9', 75', 80'; Renard 19', 34'; Bussaglia 73'; Le Sommer 81'

Lovech Stadium, Lovech
Attendance: 200
Referee: Esther Staubli (Switzerland)

27 November 2013
20:50

France	14–0	Bulgaria
Thiney 1', 4', 11', 41', 83'; Le Sommer 3', 24', 45+1', 90'; Nécib 6'; Renard 21', 37'; Abily 48'; Georges 57'	Report

MMArena, Le Mans
Attendance: 13,355
Referee: Floarea Ionescu (Romania)

5 April 2014
14:30

Bulgaria	1–6	Austria
Radoyska 66'	Report	Burger 4'; Pöltl 8', 41'; Puntigam 43'; Aschauer 51'; Makas 56'

Lovech Stadium, Lovech
Attendance: 300
Referee: Knarik Grigoryan (Armenia)
5 April 2014
15:00

Hungary	0–4	Finland
	Report	Talonen 10', 64', 90+2'; Westerlund 15'

ETO Park, Győr
Attendance: 600
Referee: Riem Hussein (Germany)
5 April 2014
20:50

France	7–0	Kazakhstan
Delie 9', 12'; Thomis 14'; Abily 21', 24'; Thiney 54', 88'	Report

Jean-Bouin Stadium, Angers
Attendance: 7,231
Referee: Hilal Tuba Tosun Ayer (Turkey)

9 April 2014
18:30

France	3–1	Austria
Bussaglia 31' (pen.); Delie 36'; Thomis 39'	Report	Puntigam 58'

MMArena, Le Mans
Attendance: 8,032
Referee: Rhona Daly (Ireland)
10 April 2014
17:00

Finland	4–0	Hungary
Talonen 20', 84'; Kemppi 40'; Engman 57'	Report

Sonera Stadium, Helsinki
Attendance: 1,953
Referee: Amy Rayner (England)

7 May 2014
10:00

Kazakhstan	4–1	Bulgaria
Zhanatayeva 9'; Kirgizbaeva 21', 34'; Yalova 70'	Report	Kireva 43'

Astana Arena, Astana
Attendance: 500
Referee: Karolina Radzik-Johan (Poland)
7 May 2014
20:50

France	4–0	Hungary
Thomis 35'; Abily 52'; Thiney 61'; Majri 89'	Report

Stade Léo Lagrange, Besançon
Attendance: 9,236
Referee: Jana Adámková (Czech Republic)

14 June 2014
15:00

Kazakhstan	1–2	Hungary
Kirgizbaeva 58'	Report	Vágó 49'; Padár 53'

Tsentralny, Almaty
Attendance: 500
Referee: Dilan Gökçek (Turkey)
14 June 2014
16:30

Austria	3–1	Finland
Makas 31'; Saari 41' (o.g.); Prohaska 80'	Report	Alanen 79'

Stadion Wiener Neustadt, Wiener Neustadt
Attendance: 850
Referee: Kateryna Monzul (Ukraine)

18 June 2014
17:00

Finland	4–0	Bulgaria
Alanen 20'; Talonen 78'; Hyyrynen 85'; Saarinen 88'	Report

Sonera Stadium, Helsinki
Attendance: 911
Referee: Petra Chudá (Slovakia)
19 June 2014
13:00

Kazakhstan	0–3	Austria
	Report	Billa 4', 78'; Burger 62'

Tsentralny, Almaty
Attendance: 450
Referee: Sharon Sluyts (Belgium)

20 August 2014
19:00

Hungary	0–4	France
	Report	Le Sommer 10', 25'; Smuczer 39' (o.g.); Delie 73'

Bozsik Stadion, Budapest
Attendance: 600
Referee: Pernilla Larsson (Sweden)
21 August 2014
17:00

Bulgaria	0–8	Finland
	Report	Sjölund 6'; Saarinen 9'; Saari 14'; Talonen 38', 49', 53'; Alanen 41'; Ruutu 75'

Lovech Stadium, Lovech
Attendance: 80
Referee: Lilach Asulin (Israel)

13 September 2014
18:30

Finland	0–2	France
	Report	Nécib 24'; Thiney 58'

ISS Stadion, Vantaa
Attendance: 1,731
Referee: Bibiana Steinhaus (Germany)
13 September 2014
18:30

Austria	4–3	Hungary
Tóth 14' (o.g.); Makas 12', 20'; Burger 67'	Report	Zeller 27'; Sipos 42'; Rácz 51'

NV Arena, Sankt Pölten
Attendance: 900
Referee: Olga Zadinová (Czech Republic)

17 September 2014
16:00

Bulgaria	0–7	Hungary
	Report	Csiszár 30'; Sipos 39', 90'; Vágó 51', 64', 67', 71'

Lovech Stadium, Lovech
Attendance: 50
Referee: Sofia Karagiorgi (Cyprus)
17 September 2014
18:00

France	3–1	Finland
Bussaglia 44'; Nécib 66'; Delie 71'	Report	Kemppi 19'

Stade de l'Épopée, Calais
Attendance: 8,086
Referee: Karolina Radzik-Johan (Poland)
17 September 2014
18:00

Austria	5–1	Kazakhstan
Makas 4', 81'; Burger 40'; Puntigam 57'; Billa 76'	Report	Yalova 51'

Waldstadion, Pasching
Attendance: 500
Referee: Mihaela Gurdon Basimamović (Croatia)

== Goalscorers ==
14 goals

- (France) Gaëtane Thiney

10 goals

- (Finland) Sanna Talonen

9 goals

- (France) Marie-Laure Delie

7 goals

- (France) Eugénie Le Sommer
- (Hungary) Fanni Vágó
- (Austria) Lisa Makas

6 goals

- (Austria) Nina Burger

5 goals

- (France) Wendie Renard

4 goals

- (France) Camille Abily
- (France) Louisa Nécib
- (Finland) Emmi Alanen
- (Hungary) Lilla Sipos

3 goals

- (Austria) Jennifer Pöltl
- (Austria) Sarah Puntigam
- (France) Élise Bussaglia
- (France) Élodie Thomis
- (Hungary) Dóra Zeller
- (Kazakhstan) Begaim Kirgizbaeva
- (Austria) Nicole Billa

2 goals

- (Bulgaria) Borislava Kireva
- (Finland) Adelina Engman
- (Austria) Carina Wenninger
- (Finland) Sanna Saarinen
- (Finland) Annica Sjölund
- (Finland) Juliette Kemppi
- (Kazakhstan) Mariya Yalova

1 goal

- (Austria) Verena Aschauer
- (Austria) Laura Feiersinger
- (Austria) Nadine Prohaska
- (Bulgaria) Silvia Radoyska
- (Finland) Tuija Hyyrynen
- (Finland) Annika Kukkonen
- (Finland) Maija Saari
- (Finland) Linda Ruutu
- (Finland) Anna Westerlund
- (France) Sabrina Delannoy
- (France) Laura Georges
- (France) Amandine Henry
- (France) Amel Majri
- (Hungary) Henrietta Csiszár
- (Hungary) Zsanett Jakabfi
- (Hungary) Zsanett Kaján
- (Hungary) Anita Padár
- (Hungary) Zsófia Rácz
- (Hungary) Boglárka Szabó
- (Kazakhstan) Madina Zhanatayeva

1 own goal

- (Bulgaria) Nikoleta Boycheva (playing against Austria)
- (Bulgaria) Silvia Radoyska (playing against Kazakhstan)
- (Finland) Maija Saari (playing against Austria)
- (Hungary) Réka Demeter (playing against Austria)
- (Hungary) Angéla Smuczer (playing against France)
- (Hungary) Gabriella Tóth (playing against Austria)
