= Emajõe =

Emajõe is a genitive form of Emajõgi, a river in Estonia and may refer to:

- Emajõe-Suursoo Nature Reserve
- Emajõe Business Centre in Tartu
- Emajõe Summer Theatre
- Emajõe tänav, street in Tartu
- Liis Emajõe (born 1991), Estonian footballer
- Riin Emajõe (born 1993), Estonian footballer
