= Pölzl =

Pölzl is a German-language surname. Notable people with the surname include:

- Ditto Pölzl (1907–1994), Austrian politician and trade unionist
- Klara Hitler (née Pölzl; 1860–1907), Austrian housewife and the mother of Adolf Hitler

== See also ==
- Pöltl
