= Pertl =

Pertl is a German surname. Notable people with the surname include:

- Anna Maria Mozart (1720–1778), née Pertl, mother of Wolfgang Amadeus Mozart
- Adrian Pertl (born 1996), Austrian alpine skier

== See also ==
- Pöltl
