= UEFA Women's Euro 2017 qualifying Group 2 =

Football tournament qualification stage

Group 2 of the UEFA Women's Euro 2017 qualifying competition consisted of five teams: Spain, Finland, Republic of Ireland, Portugal, and Montenegro. The composition of the eight groups in the qualifying group stage was decided by the draw held on 20 April 2015.

The group was played in home-and-away round-robin format. The group winners qualified directly for the final tournament, while the runners-up also qualified directly if they were one of the six best runners-up among all eight groups (not counting results against the fifth-placed team); otherwise, the runners-up advance to the play-offs.

== Standings ==
Pos	Team	Pld	W	D	L	GF	GA	GD	Pts	Qualification	Spain	Portugal	Finland	Ireland	Montenegro
1	Spain	8	8	0	0	39	2	+37	24	Final tournament	—	2–0	5–0	3–0	13–0
2	Portugal	8	4	1	3	15	11	+4	13 (Note: Head-to-head results: Finland 0–0 Portugal, Portugal 3–2 Finland.)	Play-offs	1–4	—	3–2	1–2	6–1
3	Finland	8	4	1	3	17	12	+5	13		1–2	0–0	—	4–1	1–0
4	Republic of Ireland	8	3	0	5	17	14	+3	9		0–3	0–1	0–2	—	9–0
5	Montenegro	8	0	0	8	2	51	−49	0		0–7	0–3	1–7	0–5	—

Source: UEFA
Rules for classification: Qualification tiebreakers

== Matches ==
Times are CEST (UTC+2) for dates between 29 March and 24 October 2015 and between 27 March and 29 October 2016, for other dates times are CET (UTC+1).

17 September 2015
17:00

Finland	1–0	Montenegro
Öling 67'	Report

Veritas Stadion, Turku
Attendance: 1,527
Referee: Marte Sørø (Norway)

21 September 2015
20:30

Republic of Ireland	0–2	Finland
	Report	Koivisto 13'; Sällström 71'

Tallaght Stadium, Dublin
Attendance: 2,905
Referee: Jana Adámková (Czech Republic)

27 October 2015
16:00

Portugal	1–2	Republic of Ireland
Costa 16'	Report	Quinn 22'; O'Gorman 40'

Parque de Jogos Comendador Joaquim de Almeida Freitas, Moreira de Cónegos
Attendance: 3,210
Referee: Gyöngyi Gaál (Hungary)
27 October 2015
17:05

Finland	1–2	Spain
Kuikka 25'	Report	Putellas 4'; Torrecilla 29'

Sonera Stadium, Helsinki
Attendance: 3,270
Referee: Teodora Albon (Romania)

26 November 2015
15:00

Republic of Ireland	0–3	Spain
	Report	Losada 30'; Hermoso 44' (pen.); Perry 90+3' (o.g.)

Tallaght Stadium, Dublin
Attendance: 2,736
Referee: Stéphanie Frappart (France)
26 November 2015
16:00

Portugal	6–1	Montenegro
Neto 7', 28'; C. Mendes 31'; Borges 40'; Do. Silva 61' (pen.); Fernandes 90+1'	Report	Kuč 20'

Estádio António Coimbra da Mota, Estoril
Attendance: 1,042
Referee: Julia-Stefanie Baier (Austria)

1 December 2015
20:00

Spain	2–0	Portugal
Losada 8'; Bermúdez 25'	Report

Estadio Nuevo Vivero, Badajoz
Attendance: 5,750
Referee: Simona Ghisletta (Switzerland)

24 January 2016
13:00

Montenegro	0–7	Spain
	Report	Losada 15', 62'; Boquete 22'; Putellas 42' (pen.); Hermoso 69'; Sampedro 74'; Torrecilla 77'

Stadion pod Malim brdom, Petrovac
Attendance: 100
Referee: Lorraine Clark (Scotland)

7 April 2016
14:00

Montenegro	0–5	Republic of Ireland
	Report	Quinn 3'; O'Gorman 24'; Littlejohn 26' (pen.); D. O'Sullivan 73'; Roche 84'

Stadion pod Malim brdom, Petrovac
Attendance: 70
Referee: Dimitrina Milkova (Bulgaria)

8 April 2016
19:00

Portugal	1–4	Spain
Do. Silva 66'	Report	Torrecilla 36'; Putellas 40'; Sampedro 87'; Boquete 89'

Complexo Desportivo da Covilhã, Covilhã
Attendance: 1,820
Referee: Jana Adámková (Czech Republic)

12 April 2016
14:00

Montenegro	1–7	Finland
Bulatović 8'	Report	Djurković 15' (o.g.); Alanen 21'; Danielsson 27'; Saari 68'; Sällström 73'; Saarinen 83'; Heroum 90+3'

Stadion pod Malim brdom, Petrovac
Attendance: 50
Referee: Knarik Grigoryan (Armenia)
12 April 2016
18:00

Spain	3–0	Republic of Ireland
Boquete 58', 65'; Hermoso 86'	Report

La Ciudad del Fútbol, Las Rozas de Madrid
Attendance: 1,380
Referee: Linn Andersson (Sweden)

3 June 2016
17:05

Finland	4–1	Republic of Ireland
Alanen 32'; Danielsson 39'; Kuikka 70'; Sällström 87'	Report	Roche 76'

Tehtaan kenttä, Valkeakoski
Attendance: 1,056
Referee: Cristina Dorcioman (Romania)
3 June 2016
20:00

Montenegro	0–3	Portugal
	Report	Fernandes 7', 29', 54'

Stadion pod Malim brdom, Petrovac
Attendance: 50
Referee: Ivana Martinčić (Croatia)

7 June 2016
17:05

Finland	0–0	Portugal
	Report

Sonera Stadium, Helsinki
Attendance: 4,792
Referee: Eleni Lampadariou (Greece)
7 June 2016
20:00

Republic of Ireland	9–0	Montenegro
Connolly 3'; O'Gorman 11', 53', 58'; Roche 45', 65', 69'; Quinn 62'; F. O'Sullivan 83'	Report

Tallaght Stadium, Dublin
Attendance: 946
Referee: Ivana Projkovska (Macedonia)

15 September 2016
19:00

Spain	13–0	Montenegro
Boquete 2', 7', 45', 46'; Bermúdez 10', 20', 23', 52', 90+3'; Sampedro 16'; Corredera 25'; Losada 74'; Putellas 80'	Report

La Ciudad del Fútbol, Las Rozas de Madrid
Attendance: 520
Referee: Zuzana Valentová (Slovakia)

16 September 2016
16:00

Portugal	3–2	Finland
Neto 29', 45' (pen.), 84' (pen.)	Report	Alanen 21' (pen.); Franssi 27'

Estádio do Clube Desportivo Trofense, Trofa
Attendance: 923
Referee: Riem Hussein (Germany)

20 September 2016
19:00

Spain	5–0	Finland
Torrejón 28'; Paredes 66' (pen.), 82'; Sampedro 88' (pen.); Hermoso 90+1'	Report

Estadio Butarque, Leganés
Attendance: 5,100
Referee: Monika Mularczyk (Poland)
20 September 2016
19:00

Republic of Ireland	0–1	Portugal
	Report	Neto 78'

Tallaght Stadium, Dublin
Attendance: 863
Referee: Esther Azzopardi (Malta)

== Goalscorers ==
8 goals

- (Spain) Verónica Boquete

6 goals

- (Portugal) Cláudia Neto
- (Spain) Sonia Bermúdez

5 goals

- (Republic of Ireland) Áine O'Gorman
- (Republic of Ireland) Stephanie Roche
- (Spain) Vicky Losada

4 goals

- (Portugal) Edite Fernandes
- (Spain) Jennifer Hermoso
- (Spain) Alexia Putellas
- (Spain) Amanda Sampedro

3 goals

- (Finland) Emmi Alanen
- (Finland) Linda Sällström
- (Republic of Ireland) Louise Quinn
- (Spain) Virginia Torrecilla

2 goals

- (Finland) Jenny Danielsson
- (Finland) Natalia Kuikka
- (Portugal) Dolores Silva
- (Spain) Irene Paredes

1 goal

- (Finland) Sanni Franssi
- (Finland) Nora Heroum
- (Finland) Emma Koivisto
- (Finland) Ria Öling
- (Finland) Maija Saari
- (Finland) Sanna Saarinen
- (Montenegro) Slađana Bulatović
- (Montenegro) Armisa Kuč
- (Portugal) Ana Borges
- (Portugal) Carole Costa
- (Portugal) Carolina Mendes
- (Republic of Ireland) Megan Connolly
- (Republic of Ireland) Ruesha Littlejohn
- (Republic of Ireland) Denise O'Sullivan
- (Republic of Ireland) Fiona O'Sullivan
- (Spain) Marta Corredera
- (Spain) Marta Torrejón

1 own goal

- (Montenegro) Tatjana Djurković (playing against Finland)
- (Republic of Ireland) Sophie Perry (playing against Spain)
