= Põder =

Family name

Põder is an Estonian surname (meaning moose), and may refer to:

- Andres Põder (born 1949), retired archbishop
- Anu Põder (1947–2013), sculptor
- Märt Põder (born 1979), philosopher, freedom of information activist, presenter, publicist and translator
- Raimond Põder (born 1903, date of death unknown), footballer
- Rein Põder (1943–2018), writer
- Riina Põder (1939–2014), pianist, also known as Riina Gerretz
