= Põltsamaa =

Town in Estonia

- Town
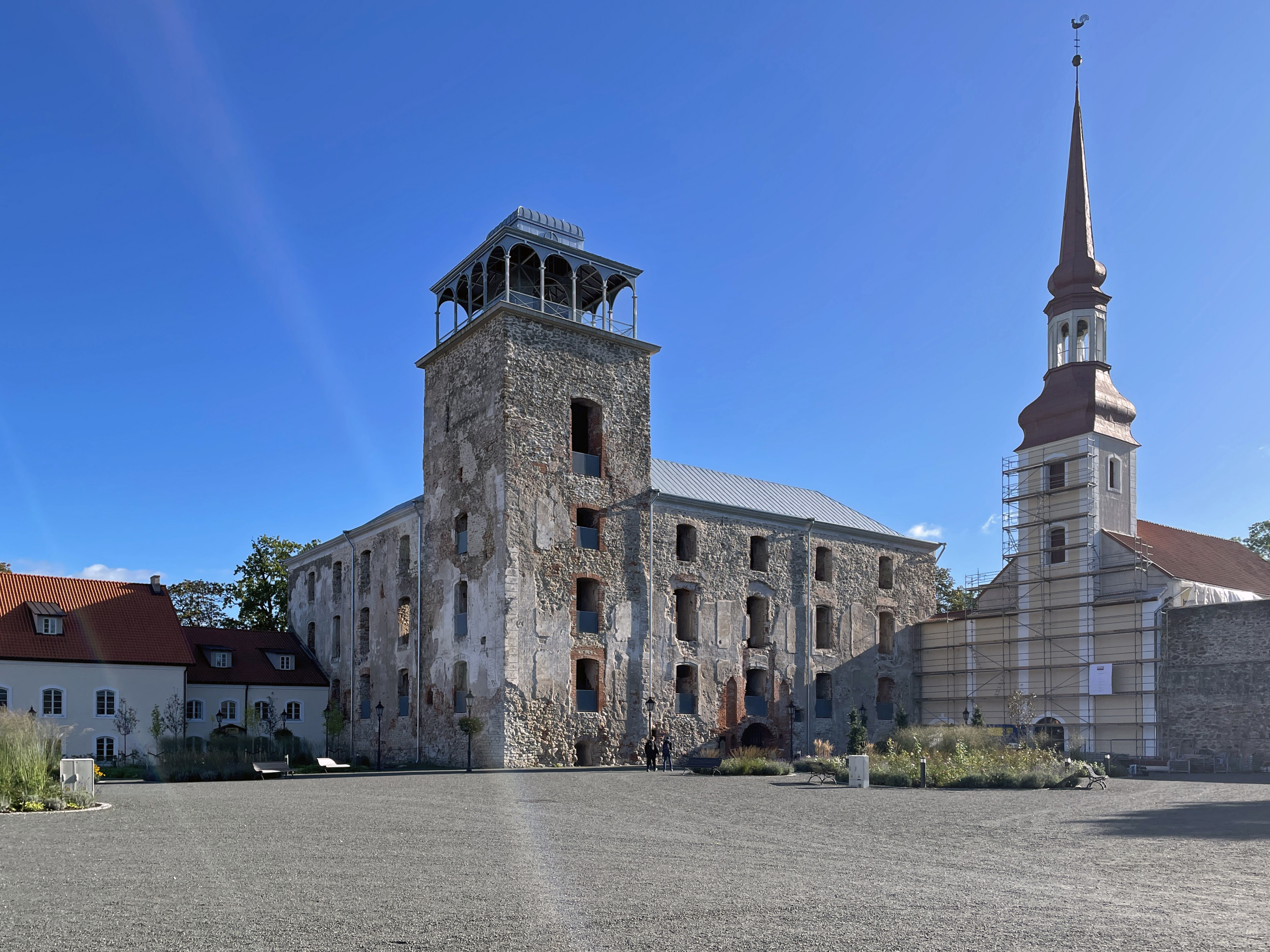
- Põltsamaa castle and church

- Location in Estonia
- Coordinates: 58°39′19″N 25°58′37″E
- Country: Estonia
- County: Jõgeva County
- Municipality: Põltsamaa Parish

Population (2026)
  - Total: 3,966
  - Rank: 26th
- Time zone: UTC+2 (EET)
  - Summer (DST): UTC+3 (EEST)

Põltsamaa (German: Oberpahlen) is a town in Põltsamaa Parish, Jõgeva County, in central Estonia. The town stands on the Põltsamaa River, and it features a 13th-century castle.

== History ==
During the German occupation in World War II, a subcamp of the Stalag 332 prisoner-of-war camp was based in the town.

== Demographics ==
Ethnic Composition 1922-2021
Ethnicity	1922		1934		1941		1959		1970		1979		1989		2000		2011		2021	
Ethnicity	amount	%	amount	%	amount	%	amount	%	amount	%	amount	%	amount	%	amount	%	amount	%	amount	%
Estonians	1997	95.1	2528	96.9	2819	98.9	3526	96.2	4307	95.2	4705	96.2	5055	97.1	4725	97.4	4104	98.0	4006	96.5
Russians	32	1.52	25	0.96	19	0.67	-	-	122	2.70	95	1.94	65	1.25	56	1.15	40	0.96	46	1.11
Ukrainians	-	-	0	0.00	-	-	-	-	7	0.15	8	0.16	10	0.19	-	-	10	0.24	17	0.41
Belarusians	-	-	-	-	-	-	-	-	14	0.31	12	0.25	11	0.21	-	-	4	0.10	5	0.12
Finns	-	-	0	0.00	1	0.04	-	-	41	0.91	46	0.94	43	0.83	-	-	15	0.36	20	0.48
Jews	1	0.05	2	0.08	0	0.00	-	-	1	0.02	2	0.04	1	0.02	-	-	0	0.00	0	0.00
Latvians	-	-	4	0.15	0	0.00	-	-	4	0.09	7	0.14	5	0.10	-	-	1	0.02	0	0.00
Germans	46	2.19	39	1.49	-	-	-	-	-	-	10	0.20	9	0.17	-	-	0	0.00	0	0.00
Tatars	-	-	0	0.00	-	-	-	-	-	-	1	0.02	3	0.06	-	-	0	0.00	0	0.00
Poles	-	-	5	0.19	5	0.18	-	-	-	-	2	0.04	2	0.04	-	-	3	0.07	0	0.00
Lithuanians	-	-	0	0.00	0	0.00	-	-	1	0.02	1	0.02	1	0.02	-	-	2	0.05	0	0.00
unknown	2	0.10	4	0.15	4	0.14	0	0.00	0	0.00	0	0.00	0	0.00	8	0.16	3	0.07	41	0.99
other	22	1.05	2	0.08	3	0.11	141	3.85	26	0.57	4	0.08	2	0.04	60	1.24	6	0.14	10	0.24
Total	2100	100	2609	100	2851	100	3667	100	4523	100	4893	100	5207	100	4849	100	4188	100	4150	99.8

== Gallery ==
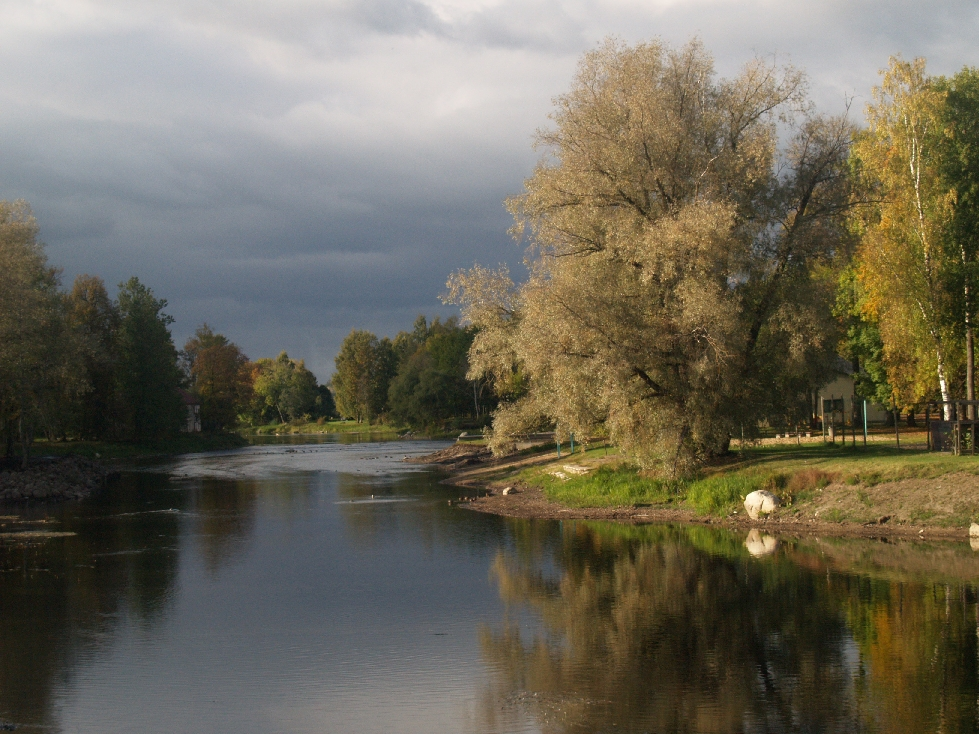
Põltsamaa River

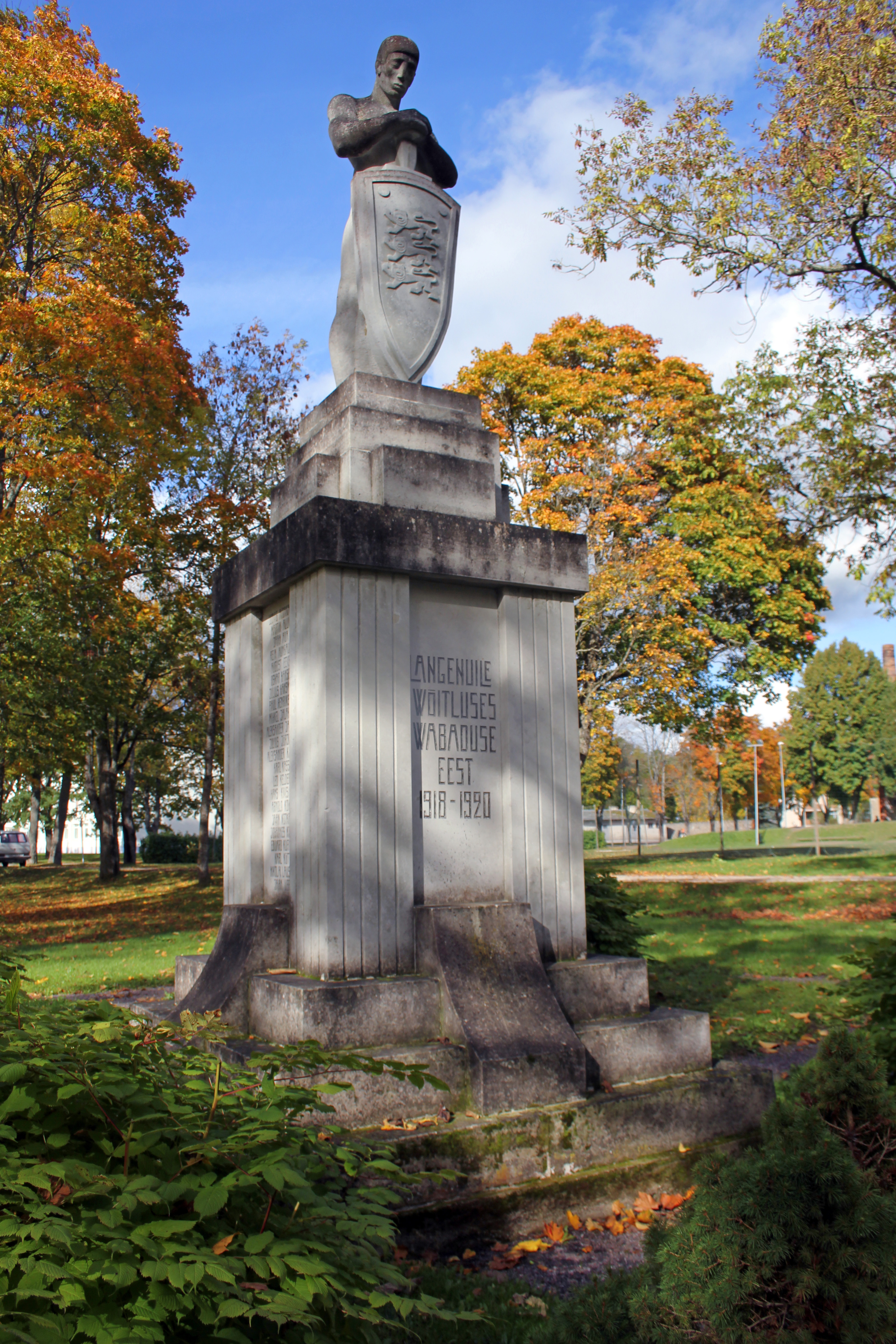
Monument to the Estonian War of Independence

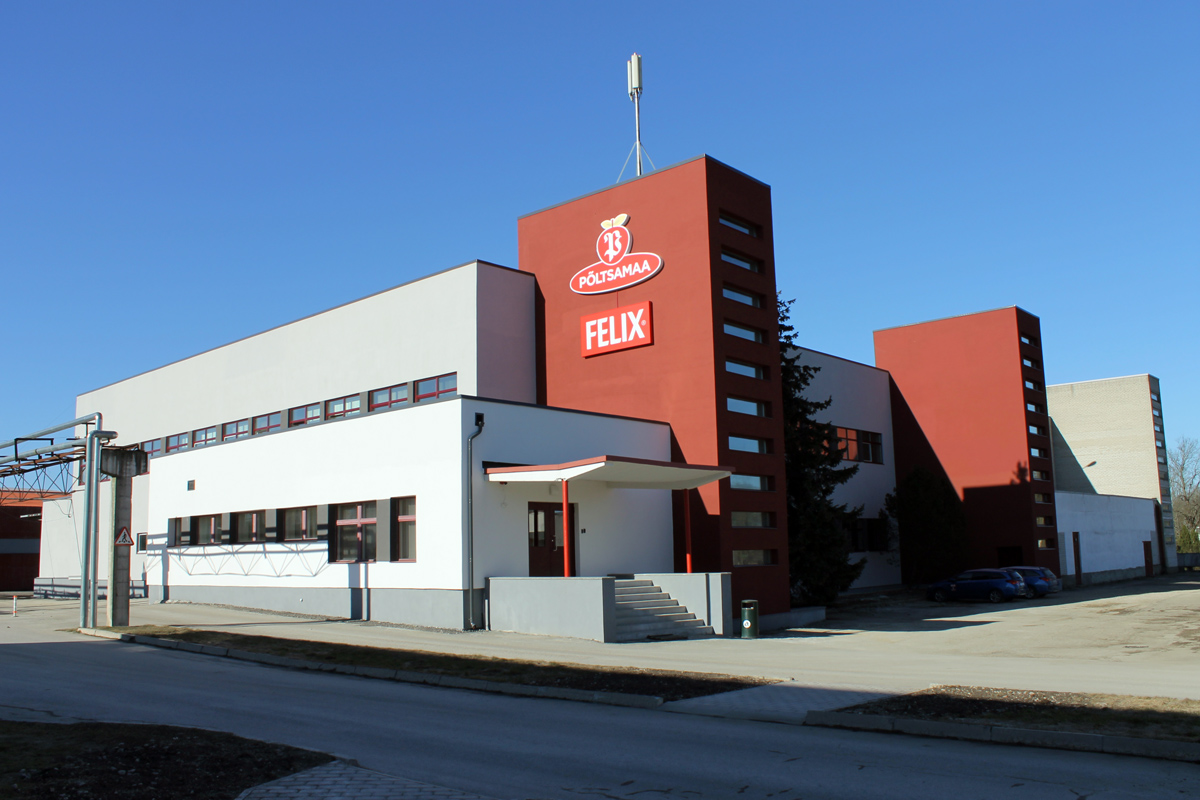
Põltsamaa Felix is the biggest local employer.

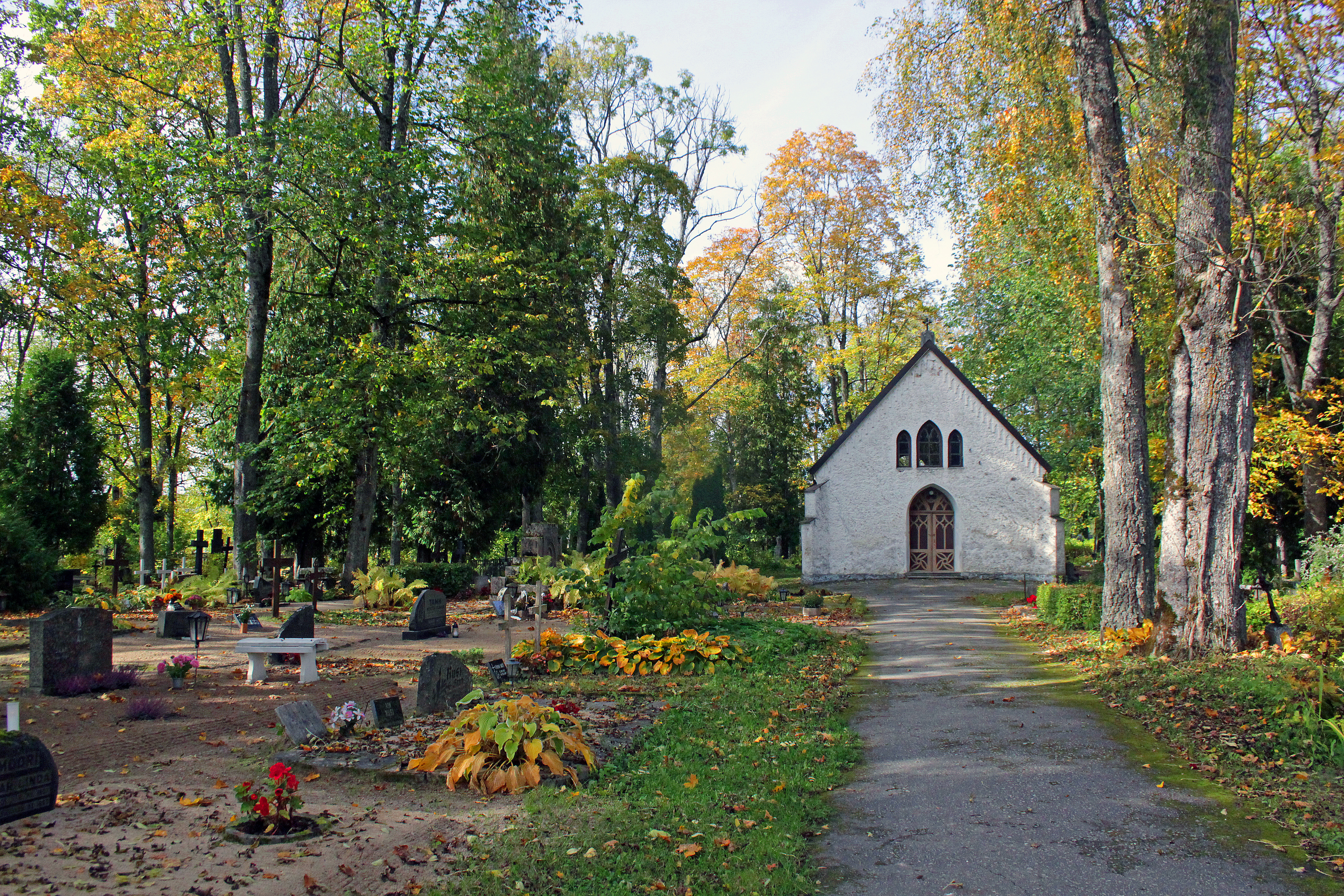
Põltsamaa cemetery

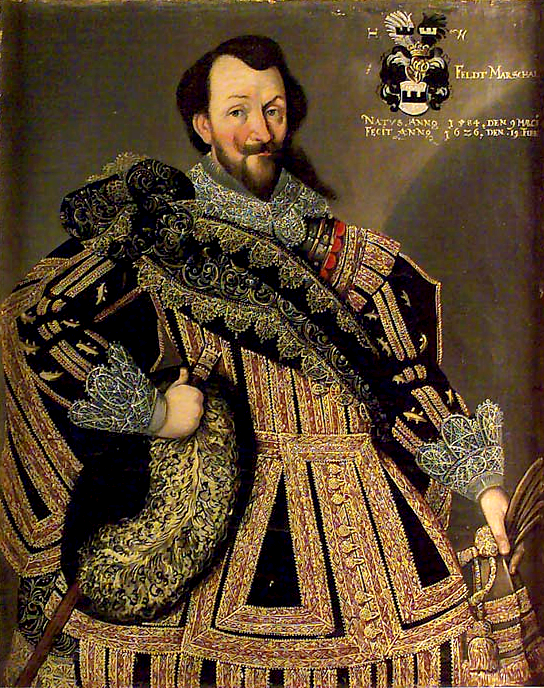
Herman von Wrangel, 1626

== Notable people ==
- Herman Wrangel (born 1584/1587 – 1643), a Baltic German, Swedish military officer and statesman
- Hannes Altrov (born 1944), the main clarinetist of the Estonian National Symphony Orchestra since 1977
- Jaan Leetsar (1946–2026), politician; Minister of Agriculture, 1992 to 1994
- Margi Ein (born 1950), politician and engineer, the Mayor of Põltsamaa, 1996 to 2003
- Liis Lass (born 1989), stage, film, and TV actress.

=== Sport ===
- Aivar Anniste (born 1980), footballer who has played about 400 games and 45 for Estonia
- Liis Emajõe (born 1991), was a footballer who played 34 games for Estonia women
- Riin Emajõe (born 1993), footballer who played 89 games and 23 for Estonia women
