= UEFA Women's Euro 2013 qualifying Group 5 =

Football tournament qualification stage

The UEFA Women's Euro 2013 qualifying – Group 5 was contested by five teams competing for one spot for the final tournament.

== Standings ==
Team qualified for UEFA Women's Euro 2013
Team competes in Play-off round

Team	Pld	W	D	L	GF	GA	GD	Pts
Finland	8	6	1	1	22	4	+18	19
Ukraine	8	5	1	2	18	4	+14	16
Belarus	8	4	1	3	10	17	−7	13
Slovakia	8	3	1	4	8	7	+1	10
Estonia	8	0	0	8	5	31	−26	0

Source: UEFA.com

== Fixtures ==
All times are UTC+2.

25 August 2011
15:30

Belarus	2–1	Estonia
Novikova 31'; Aniskovtseva 45+1'	Report	Emajõe 71'

City Stadium, Molodechno
Attendance: 1,800
Referee: Floarea Ionescu (Romania)

18 September 2011
18:00

Estonia	1–4	Ukraine
Aarna 90'	Report	Djatel 2', 21'; Apanaschenko 9', 19'

A. Le Coq Arena, Tallinn
Attendance: 265
Referee: Aneliya Sinabova (Bulgaria)

22 October 2011
15:00

Ukraine	0–0	Slovakia
	Report

Yuri Gagarin Stadium, Chernihiv
Attendance: 3,200
Referee: Dilan Gökçek (Turkey)
22 October 2011
18:00

Finland	6–0	Estonia
Sällström 33', 62', 71'; Saari 48', 87'; Sjölund 55'	Report

ISS Stadion, Vantaa
Attendance: 1,212
Referee: Morag Pirie (Scotland)

26 October 2011
16:00

Slovakia	3–1	Estonia
Klechová 18', 45'; Škorvánková 27'	Report	Loo 4'

NTC Senec, Senec
Attendance: 250
Referee: Amy Rayner (England)

27 October 2011
13:00

Belarus	2–2	Finland
Avkhimovich 42', 51'	Report	Sällström 15', 50'

City Stadium, Molodechno
Attendance: 2,250
Referee: Rhona Daly (Ireland)

19 November 2011
16:00

Slovakia	3–0	Belarus
Bojdová 52'; Klechová 71'; Bartovičová 89'	Report

NTC Senec, Senec
Attendance: 225
Referee: Tanja Schett (Austria)

24 November 2011
14:00

Ukraine	0–1	Belarus
	Report	Aniskovtseva 5'

Sport Complex, Sevastopol
Attendance: 600
Referee: Amy Rayner (England)

31 March 2012
17:30

Slovakia	0–1	Finland
	Report	Kolenová 90+2' (o.g.)

NTC Senec, Senec
Attendance: 860
Referee: Gyöngyi Gaál (Hungary)

5 April 2012
18:30

Finland	2–0	Slovakia
Alanen 24'; Tolvanen 90+1'	Report

ISS Stadion, Vantaa
Attendance: 1,210
Referee: Mihaela Gurdon Basimamović (Croatia)
5 April 2012
18:30

Ukraine	5–0	Estonia
Apanaschenko 18', 28', 70'; Pekur 30'; Chorna 33'	Report

Sport Complex, Sevastopol
Attendance: 1,200
Referee: Carina Vitulano (Italy)

16 June 2012
15:00

Estonia	2–4	Belarus
Aarna 49'; Õunpuu 59'	Report	Shramok 46', 63'; Buzunova 72', 87'

Tehvandi Staadion, Otepää
Attendance: 90
Referee: Esther Azzopardi (Malta)
16 June 2012
17:00

Ukraine	1–2	Finland
Khodyreva 69'	Report	Talonen 35', 85'

Olympic sports training centre Chernihiv, Chernihiv
Attendance: 1,100
Referee: Bibiana Steinhaus (Germany)

20 June 2012
18:00

Finland	4–0	Belarus
Kukkonen 23'; Talonen 48'; Puranen 58'; Sjölund 61'	Report

Sonera Stadium, Helsinki
Attendance: 1,450
Referee: Esther Staubli (Switzerland)
20 June 2012
19:00

Slovakia	0–2	Ukraine
	Report	Dyatel 16'; Romanenko 57'

NTC Senec, Senec
Attendance: 400
Referee: Efthalia Mitsi (Greece)

25 August 2012
15:00

Estonia	0–2	Slovakia
	Report	Hmírová 24'; Škorvánková 47'

Haapsalu Stadium, Haapsalu
Attendance: 138
Referee: Donka Jeleva-Terzieva (Bulgaria)

15 September 2012
15:00

Estonia	0–5	Finland
	Report	Puranen 7'; Talonen 13', 61', 77'; Saari 21' (pen.)

A. Le Coq Arena, Tallinn
Attendance: 438
Referee: Lilach Asulin (Israel)
15 September 2012
17:00

Belarus	0–5	Ukraine
	Report	Apanaschenko 28', 32'; Dyatel 57'; Vorontsova 65'; Khodyreva 81' (pen.)

Spartak Stadium, Mogilev
Attendance: 300
Referee: Pernilla Larsson (Sweden)

19 September 2012
17:30

Belarus	1–0	Slovakia
Shpak 54'	Report

Spartak Stadium, Mogilev
Attendance: 1,000
Referee: Sandra Braz Bastos (Portugal)
19 September 2012
17:30

Finland	0–1	Ukraine
	Report	Pekur 71'

Sonera Stadium, Helsinki
Attendance: 915
Referee: Cristina Dorcioman (Romania)

== Goalscorers ==
7 goals

- (Ukraine) Daryna Apanaschenko

6 goals

- (Finland) Sanna Talonen

5 goals

- (Finland) Linda Sällström

4 goals

- (Ukraine) Vera Djatel

3 goals

- (Finland) Maija Saari
- (Slovakia) Veronika Klechová

2 goals

- (Belarus) Olga Aniskovtseva
- (Belarus) Ekaterina Avkhimovich
- (Belarus) Maria Buzunova
- (Belarus) Tatyana Shramok
- (Estonia) Signy Aarna
- (Finland) Leena Puranen
- (Finland) Annica Sjölund
- (Slovakia) Dominika Škorvánková
- (Ukraine) Olena Khodyreva
- (Ukraine) Lyudmyla Pekur

1 goal

- (Belarus) Olga Novikova
- (Belarus) Oksana Shpak
- (Estonia) Liis Emajõe
- (Estonia) Katrin Loo
- (Estonia) Kethy Õunpuu
- (Finland) Emmi Alanen
- (Finland) Annika Kukkonen
- (Finland) Marianna Tolvanen
- (Slovakia) Diana Bartovičová
- (Slovakia) Ivana Bojdová
- (Slovakia) Patrícia Hmírová
- (Ukraine) Tetyana Chorna
- (Ukraine) Tetyana Romanenko
- (Ukraine) Daryna Vorontsova

1 own goal

- (Slovakia) Eva Kolenová (playing against Finland)
