= 2013 Cyprus Women's Cup =

Tournament details
- Host country: Cyprus
- Dates: 3–14 March 2013
- Teams: 12 (from 5 confederations)
- Venues: 3 (in 3 host cities)

Final positions
- Champions: England (2nd title)
- Runners-up: Canada
- Third place: New Zealand
- Fourth place: Switzerland

Tournament statistics
- Matches played: 24
- Goals scored: 63 (2.63 per match)
- Top scorer(s): (England) Ellen White (Finland) Sanna Talonen (3 goals)

The 2013 Cyprus Women's Cup was the sixth edition of the Cyprus Women's Cup, an invitational women's football tournament held annually in Cyprus. It took place between 3–14 March 2013.

Defending champions France cancelled their participation just after the UEFA Euro 2013 draw, because of too many European opponents in the tournament. The tournament was won by England.

== Format ==
The twelve invited teams are split into three groups that played a round-robin tournament.

Groups A and B, containing the strongest ranked teams, are the only ones in contention to win the title. The group winners from A and B contested the final, with the runners-up playing for third place. The Group C winner faced the better third place team from Groups A and B for fifth, with the Group C runner-up facing the other third place team for seventh. Group C's third place team faced the better fourth place team of Groups A and B, while the other two fourth place teams play in the 11th place match.

Points awarded in the group stage followed the standard formula of three points for a win, one point for a draw and zero points for a loss. In the case of two teams being tied on the same number of points in a group, their head-to-head result determined the higher place.

== Venues ==
The games were played in 3 host stadiums in 3 cities.

Host cities

Stadium	City	Capacity
GSP Stadium	Nicosia	22,859
GSZ Stadium	Larnaca	13,032
Paralimni Stadium	Paralimni	5,800

== Teams ==
Listed are the confirmed teams.

The only debutant is the Republic of Ireland.

- Canada
- England
- Finland
- Italy
- Republic of Ireland
- Netherlands
- New Zealand
- Northern Ireland
- Scotland
- South Africa
- South Korea
- Switzerland

== Group stage ==
=== Group A ===
Team	Pld	W	D	L	GF	GA	GD	Pts
England	3	2	1	0	11	7	+4	7
New Zealand	3	2	0	1	4	3	+1	6
Scotland	3	1	1	1	6	6	0	4
Italy	3	0	0	3	3	8	−5	0

6 March 2013
14:30

New Zealand	1–0	Scotland
Hearn 26'

GSP Stadium, Nicosia
6 March 2013
17:30

England	4–2	Italy
Nobbs 8'; Houghton 30'; Clarke 33'; E. White 84'	Report	Camporese 17', 27'

GSP Stadium, Nicosia

8 March 2013
14:30

New Zealand	2–0	Italy
Wilkinson 65'; Green 71'	Report

GSZ Stadium, Larnaca
8 March 2013
17:30

Scotland	4–4	England
Evans 18'; Ross 49'; Little 51'; Mitchell 83'	Report	E. White 40'; Duggan 45+1'; Williams 74'; Smith 78'

GSZ Stadium, Larnaca

11 March 2013
14:30

England	3–1	New Zealand
White 71'; Aluko 72'; Duggan 90'		Hearn 7'

GSZ Stadium, Larnaca
11 March 2013
14:30

Italy	1–2	Scotland
Gama 75'	Report	J.Ross 17'; Jones 63'

GSP Stadium, Nicosia

=== Group B ===
Team	Pld	W	D	L	GF	GA	GD	Pts
Canada	3	3	0	0	5	1	+4	9
Switzerland	3	1	1	1	4	5	−1	4
Netherlands	3	0	2	1	2	3	−1	2
Finland	3	0	1	2	4	6	−2	1

6 March 2013
14:30

Canada	2–0	Switzerland
Schmidt 2'; Matheson 79'	Report

GSZ Stadium, Larnaca
Attendance: 50
Referee: Christina Husballe (Denmark)
6 March 2013
17:30

Finland	1–1	Netherlands
Talonen 36'	Report (Palloliitto); Report (OnsOranje)	van de Donk 83'

GSZ Stadium, Larnaca

8 March 2013
14:30

Switzerland	1–1	Netherlands
Bachmann 24'	Report (SFV); Report (KNVB)	Martens 12'

GSP Stadium, Nicosia
8 March 2013
17:30

Finland	1–2	Canada
Alanen 6'	Report	Filigno 29'; Sinclair 37' (pen.)

GSP Stadium, Nicosia

11 March 2013
17:30

Finland	2–3	Switzerland
Saari 17'; Talonen 25'	Report	Bachmann 1'; Dickenmann 45'; Bernauer 63'

GSZ Stadium, Larnaca
Referee: Rhona Dhaly (Republic of Ireland)
11 March 2013
17:30

Netherlands	0–1	Canada
	Report	Sinclair 43'

GSP Stadium, Nicosia

=== Group C ===
Team	Pld	W	D	L	GF	GA	GD	Pts
Republic of Ireland	3	2	1	0	6	1	+5	7
South Korea	3	2	1	0	5	0	+5	7
South Africa	3	1	0	2	2	4	−2	3
Northern Ireland	3	0	0	3	2	10	−8	0

6 March 2013
14:30

South Korea	2–0	South Africa
Ji So-yun 10'; Lee Geum-min 55'	Report

Tasos Markou, Paralimni
6 March 2013
17:30

Republic of Ireland	5–1	Northern Ireland
Caldwell 11'; Quinn 27'; Campbell 71'; Smyth 77'; Littlejohn 90'	Report	McShane 60'

Tasos Markou, Paralimni

8 March 2013
14:30

Republic of Ireland	1–0	South Africa
O'Gorman 52'	Report

Tasos Markou, Paralimni
8 March 2013
17:30

South Korea	3–0	Northern Ireland
Ji So-yun 11'; Kim Sang-eun 63'; Lee Eun-mi 68'	Report

Tasos Markou, Paralimni

11 March 2013
14:30

South Africa	2–1	Northern Ireland
Moodaly 65'; Seoposenwe 68'	Report	Shepherd 85'

Tasos Markou, Paralimni
11 March 2013
17:30

South Korea	0–0	Republic of Ireland
	Report (KFA); Report (ET)

Tasos Markou, Paralimni

== Knockout stage ==
=== Eleventh place match ===
13 March 2013

South Africa	1–1 (a.e.t.)	Northern Ireland
Skiti 89'	Report	Nelson 2'
Penalties
	5–4

=== Ninth place match ===
13 March 2013

South Korea	0–1	Italy
	Report (KFA); Report (FIGC)	Bonansea 56'

=== Seventh place match ===
13 March 2013

Republic of Ireland	0–1	Finland
		Talonen 20'

=== Fifth place match ===
13 March 2013

Scotland	1–0	Netherlands
Little 29'	Report

=== Third place match ===
13 March 2013

New Zealand	2–1	Switzerland
Hassett 85'; Wilkinson 87'	Report	Crnogorčević 23'

Referee: Barbara Bollenberger (Austria)

=== Final ===
13 March 2013

England	1–0	Canada
Yankey 70'	Report

== Champion ==
2013 Cyprus Cup

England
Second title

== Goalscorers ==
3 goals

- (England) Ellen White
- (Finland) Sanna Talonen

2 goals

- (Canada) Christine Sinclair
- (England) Toni Duggan
- (Italy) Elisa Camporese
- (New Zealand) Amber Hearn
- (New Zealand) Hannah Wilkinson
- (Scotland) Kim Little
- (Scotland) Jane Ross
- (South Korea) Ji So-yun
- (Switzerland) Ramona Bachmann

1 goal

- (Canada) Jonelle Filigno
- (Canada) Diana Matheson
- (Canada) Sophie Schmidt
- (England) Eniola Aluko
- (England) Jessica Clarke
- (England) Steph Houghton
- (England) Jordan Nobbs
- (England) Kelly Smith
- (England) Rachel Williams
- (England) Rachel Yankey
- (Finland) Emmi Alanen
- (Finland) Maija Saari
- (Italy) Barbara Bonansea
- (Italy) Sara Gama
- (Netherlands) Daniëlle van de Donk
- (Netherlands) Lieke Martens
- (New Zealand) Anna Green
- (New Zealand) Betsy Hassett
- (Northern Ireland) Alana McShane
- (Northern Ireland) Julie Nelson
- (Northern Ireland) Lynda Shepherd
- (Republic of Ireland) Diane Caldwell
- (Republic of Ireland) Megan Campbell
- (Republic of Ireland) Ruesha Littlejohn
- (Republic of Ireland) Áine O'Gorman
- (Republic of Ireland) Louise Quinn
- (Republic of Ireland) Shannon Smyth
- (Scotland) Lisa Evans
- (Scotland) Rhonda Jones
- (Scotland) Emma Mitchell
- (South Africa) Robyn Moodaly
- (South Africa) Jermaine Seoposenwe
- (South Africa) Nocane Skiti
- (South Korea) Lee Geum-min
- (South Korea) Lee Eun-mi
- (South Korea) Kim Sang-eun
- (Switzerland) Vanessa Bernauer
- (Switzerland) Ana-Maria Crnogorčević
- (Switzerland) Lara Dickenmann
