= Shannon Smyth =

Irish American footballer and coach

Shannon Smyth Eisberner
Personal information
- Full name: Shannon Carroll Smyth
- Date of birth: 22 June 1987 (age 39)
- Place of birth: Milwaukee, Wisconsin, United States
- Height: 5 ft 3 in (1.60 m)
- Positions: Midfielder; forward

Youth career
- FC Milwaukee Nationals

Senior career*
Years	Team	Apps	(Gls)
2005–2008	Louisville Cardinals		
2009	FC Indiana		
2010	Donn Toppfotball	6	(6)
2011–2014	Amazon Grimstad	43	(10)

International career
2010–2014	Republic of Ireland	33	(1)
- * Club domestic league appearances and goals as of 6 March 2013

Shannon Carroll Smyth (born 22 June 1987) is an Irish American soccer coach and former player. During her career she represented the Republic of Ireland women's national football team and the Norwegian Toppserien clubs Donn Toppfotball and Amazon Grimstad.

== College career ==
Smyth played varsity soccer during four years at the University of Louisville. She represented Ireland in the 2007 Summer Universiade in Bangkok.

== Club career ==
After graduation Smyth featured in the 2009 W-League for FC Indiana.

In January 2010 Smyth agreed a one–year professional contract with newly promoted Toppserien club Donn Toppfotball. When Donn went bankrupt in November 2010, Smyth joined five teammates in signing for nearby Amazon Grimstad for the 2011 season.

== International career ==
Smyth has dual Irish–American citizenship as her father Brendan was born and raised in Dún Laoghaire. She attended the Republic of Ireland national team's American summer training camps in 2008 and 2009.

In August 2010 Smyth was called into the Republic of Ireland squad for their final World Cup qualifiers. She then won her first cap for Ireland in a 2–0 friendly defeat in the Netherlands. Smyth started the game wearing number ten and playing in central midfield. Further appearances followed in the qualifiers against Russia and Israel.

She announced her retirement from soccer in November 2014 and confirmed her decision in August 2015. She won 33 caps for Ireland. Her only goal was scored against Northern Ireland at the 2013 Cyprus Cup.

=== International goals ===
Scores and results list Ireland's goal tally first.

#	Date	Venue	Opponent	Result	Competition	Scored
1	6 March 2013	Tasos Markou, Paralimni	Northern Ireland	5–1	Cyprus Cup	1
