= Riina Gerretz =

Estonian pianist

Riina Gerretz (8 July 1939 – 22 March 2014) was an Estonian pianist. She was best known for performing with artists such as Georg Ots, Tiit Kuusik, Hendrik Krumm, Ivo Kuusk, Anu Kaal, Margarita Voites, Jüri Gerretz, Ivo Juul, Yolanda Hernandez, Artur Rinne, Hannes Altrov, Pille Lill and Heidy Tamme. She worked mostly in her native Estonia as well as Finland. During her life, she had the surnames Põder (1939–1958), Villum (1958–1961), Mikiver (1969–1971), Viljanen 1983–2002, Gerretz (until 2014).

Gerretz died after a long illness on 22 March 2014 in Tallinn. She was 74 years old.
