= Olga Aniskovtseva =

Belarusian footballer

Personal information
- Full name: Olga Aniskovtseva
- Date of birth: 22 April 1982 (age 44)
- Place of birth: Zhlobin, Belarus
- Height: 5 ft 6 in (1.67 m)
- Positions: Midfielder; forward

Team information
- Current team: Bobruichanka

Senior career*
Years	Team	Apps	(Gls)
- Bobruichanka
- Alma KTZh
- Universitet Vitebsk
2010–?	SShVSM-Kairat Almaty		
2015-	Bobruichanka	173	(79)

International career
	Belarus	21	(8)
- * Club domestic league appearances and goals

Olga Aniskovtseva (born 22 April 1982) is a Belarusian international football midfielder currently playing for Bobruichanka.

She debuted in international competitions in the inaugural UEFA Women's Cup edition in 2001, playing for Bobruichanka. In September 2011 she scored both goals in SShVSM's 2–1 win against SV Neulengbach, and earlier in August she scored the winner in Belarus first match in the UEFA Women's Euro 2013 qualification over Estonia.
