= Pöltl =

Pöltl or Poltl is a German surname. Notable people with the name include:

- Adam F. Poltl (1891–1969), American businessman and politician
- Jakob Pöltl (born 1995), Austrian basketball player
- Jennifer Pöltl (born 1993), Austrian footballer
- Randy Poltl, American football player
- Tom Poltl (born 1977), American soccer player

== See also ==
- Pölzl
