= Ditto Pölzl =

Austrian politician and trade unionist

August "Ditto" Pölzl (28 June 1907 – 15 April 1994) was an Austrian politician and trade unionist. He joined the Communist Party of Austria (KPÖ) in 1934, and represented the party in the Styrian provisional state governments after World War II as well as the state parliament until 1957. He broke his ties with the KPÖ in 1957.

== Life and career ==
=== Youth and entry into politics ===
Pölzl was born in Eggenberg on 28 June 1907. In 1921, he became an apprentice draftsman at the engineering and construction firm Wagner Biró AG. Pölzl joined the Social Democratic Workers Party of Austria (SDAPÖ) at 18 and became a leading figure in the left-wing opposition in Styria. He was a leader of the Socialist Workers Youth (SAJ) in Graz. In 1932, he took part in building the Jungfront movement, and in Graz he worked with Otto Fischer and Willy Scholz to challenge the control the party leadership had over the Jungfront. He was a member of the municipal council of Eggenberg from 1932 to 1934.

=== Civil war, exile and World War II ===
Pölzl fought in the 1934 February Uprising on the side of the Republikanischer Schutzbund, after which he joined the KPÖ in Vienna. He escaped to the Soviet Union together with Ernst Fischer; upon his return to Austria in February 1935, he was arrested, and was detained from April to July 1935 (or until December 1935 per other sources). Pölzl went into exile but was able to return to Austria, and was living in Graz in 1938. He was under surveillance by the Gestapo between 1938 and 1945, and he was arrested a number of times.

=== Post-War Styrian politics ===
Pölzl was a member of all three provisional Styrian state governments formed in 1945, the first of which was formed under the leadership of Social Democratic politician Reinhard Machold on 8 May 1945, before the arrival of the Red Army. His role in this was that of a trade union representative, rather than representing the KPÖ as such. He was responsible for Arts, Culture and Education from 15 May to 28 December 1945. Upon taking the post, he ordered the immediate reopening of the Graz theaters. He contributed with texts to the Grazer Antifaschistischen Volkszeitung ('Graz Anti-Fascist People's Newspaper').

Pölzl remained in his post after the British takeover of Styria on 24 July 1945 and the formation of a new provisional state government on 7 August 1945 (in which the British military authorities reduced the share of communist government members from three to two). He became the president of the provisional board of the Musical Association of Styria, an entity whose role worried the British military authorities during the autumn of 1945. He would later serve as vice president of the same association.

Pölzl was elected to the Styrian state parliament (landtag) in 1945, where he became one of two KPÖ deputees in Styria and one of 15 KPÖ state parliament deputies across Austria, holding the former role from 12 December 1945 to 18 March 1957. In the late 1940s, he was the vice president of the Styrian Chamber for Workers and Employees.

=== Breaking with the Communist Party ===
Pölzl was a member of the KPÖ Central Committee between 1946 and 1957. Between autumn 1946 and January 1947, he and other members called for the party to resign from the Austrian government. Pölzl felt that the party should have prioritized mass struggles rather than government participation, and he and the other critics were worried that the role of the party in the government would alienate the grassroots of the party. Pölzl also argued that a trade union representative at a major corporation would be more valuable for the party than a government minister.

Pölzl and Willy Scholz demonstratively resigned from the KPÖ 17th party congress, which was held between 28 and 31 March 1957. Pölzl's resignation occurred in the aftermath of the Hungarian Revolution of 1956. He rejoined the Social Democratic Party in 1967. Pölzl died on 15 April 1994 after a brief period of severe illness.
