= Edina Markó =

Hungarian footballer (born 1973)

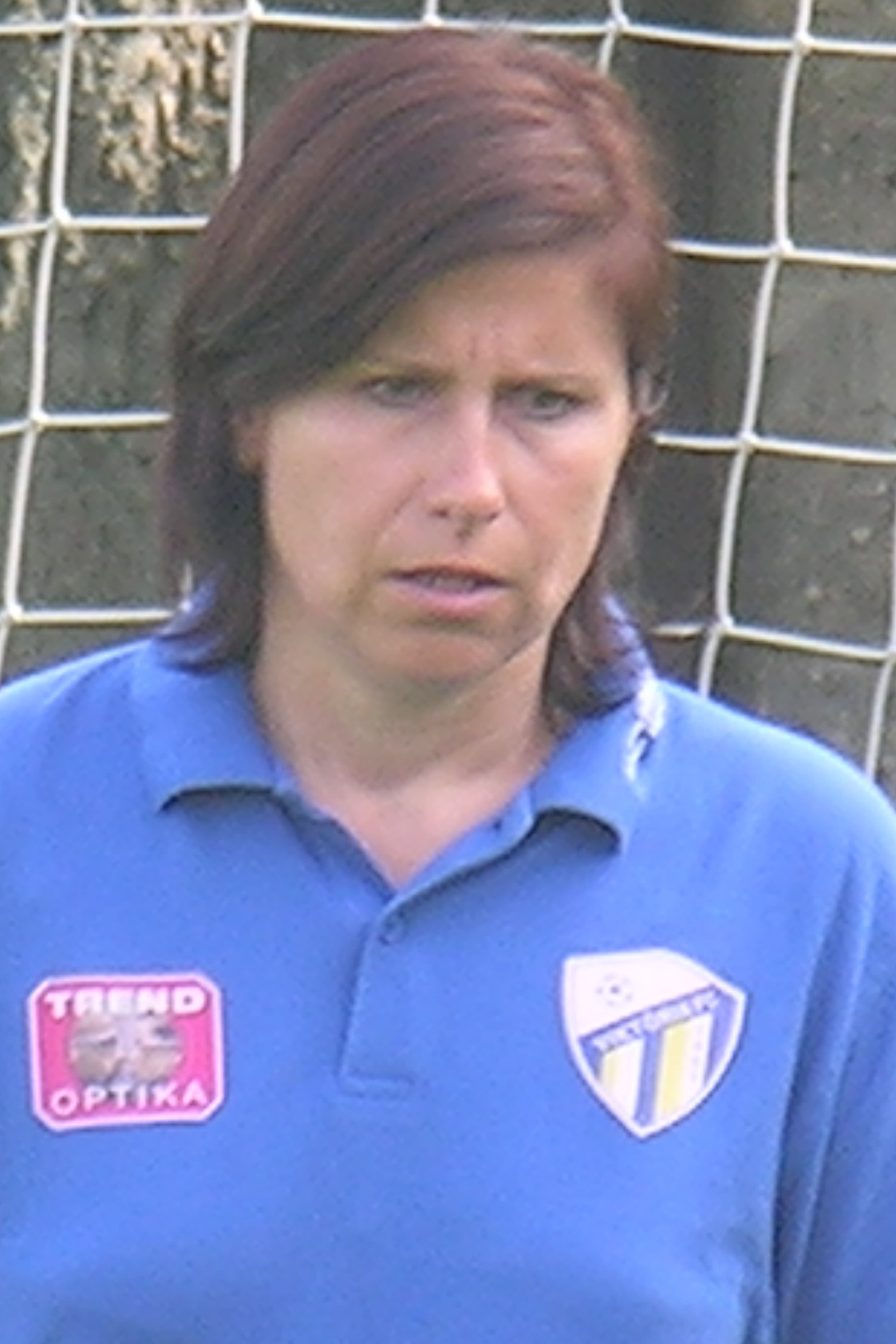

Personal information
- Full name: Edina Hérincsné Markó
- Date of birth: 5 June 1973 (age 53)
- Place of birth: Hungary
- Position: Midfielder

Senior career*
Years	Team	Apps	(Gls)
- Astra Hungary FC
- Viktória FC-Szombathely

International career
1993–2004	Hungary	55	(7)

Managerial career
- 2014–2020: Hungary
- * Club domestic league appearances and goals

Edina Hérincsné Markó (born 6 June 1973) is a Hungarian football manager and former footballer.

== Playing career ==
Markó played for Hungarian side Viktória FC-Szombathely, helping the club win the league.

== Managerial career ==
Markó managed the Hungary women's national under-19 football team at the 2005 UEFA Women's Under-19 Championship. In 2014, she was appointed manager of the Hungary women's national football team.
