= Réka Demeter =

Hungarian footballer (born 1991)

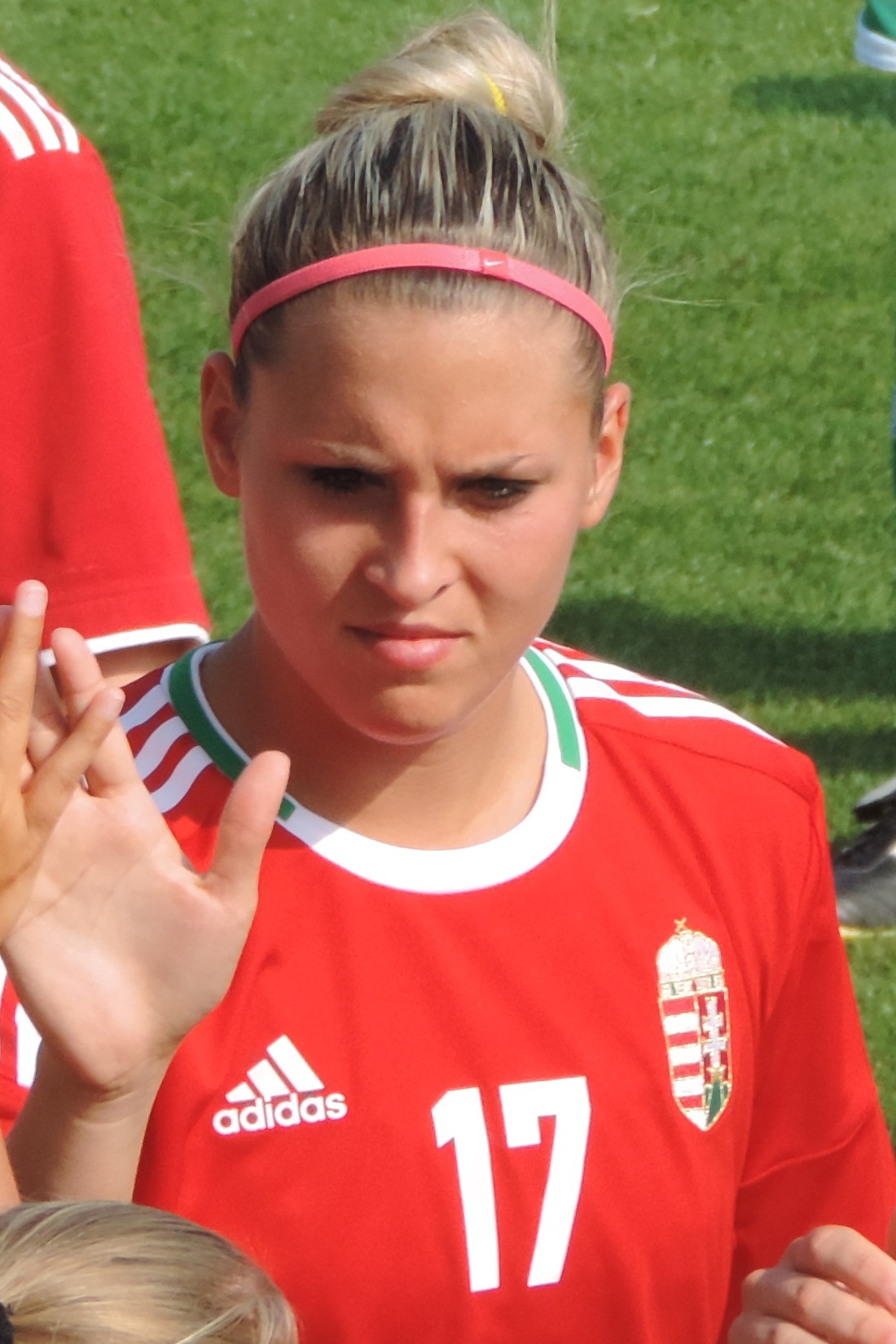

Personal information
- Full name: Réka Demeter
- Date of birth: 26 September 1991 (age 35)
- Place of birth: Esztergom, Hungary
- Position: Centre back

Senior career*
Years	Team	Apps	(Gls)
2005–2009	Ferencváros		
2009–2011	MTK Hungária FC		
2011–	UE L'Estartit		

International career^{‡}
2009–	Hungary	42	(0)
- * Club domestic league appearances and goals ‡ National team caps and goals as of 8 September 2018

Réka Demeter (born 26 September 1991 in Esztergom) is a Hungarian football defender, currently playing for UE L'Estartit in Spain's Primera División. She previously played for Ferencváros and MTK Hungária FC in Hungary's Noi NB I.

She is a member of the Hungarian national team.
