= Maija Saari =

Finnish footballer (born 1986)

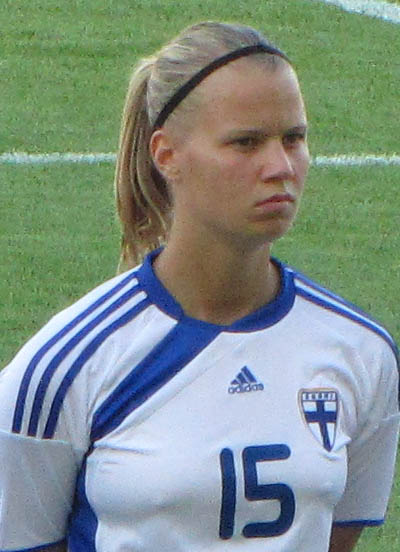

Personal information
- Full name: Maija Karoliina Saari
- Date of birth: 26 March 1986 (age 40)
- Place of birth: Vaasa, Finland
- Height: 1.72 m (5 ft 7 1/2 in)
- Position: Defender

Team information
- Current team: Stabæk

Youth career
- FC Kiisto

Senior career*
Years	Team	Apps	(Gls)
2002–2008	FC Honka		
2009–2010	Umeå IK	43	(4)
2011	Kolbotn	21	(1)
2012	AIK	22	(2)
2013	Mallbackens IF	8	(0)
2014–2015	AIK	36	(2)
2016	Stabæk		
2016	Vålerenga		
2017–2018	HPK		

International career^{‡}
2007–2016	Finland	86	(9)
- * Club domestic league appearances and goals as of 06:21, 29 December 2015 (UTC) ‡ National team caps and goals as of 06:21, 29 December 2015 (UTC)

Maija Karoliina Saari (born 26 March 1986) is a Finnish international footballer who plays as a defender. She previously represented AIK, Mallbackens IF and Umeå IK in Sweden, Kolbotn, Stabæk Fotball Kvinner, and Vålerenga in the Norwegian Toppserien and FC Honka and HPK in her home country. Since making her debut for the Finland women's national football team in 2007, Saari has won over 85 caps and captained the team.

== Club career ==
A strong, left-sided defender, Saari won three consecutive domestic titles with FC Honka in 2006, 2007 and 2008. She joined the club aged 10 after moving to Helsinki from her birthplace of Vaasa and rose to captain the club. In December 2008 Saari signed a two-year contract with Swedish club Umeå IK. In 2011, she played for Kolbotn Fotball in the Norwegian Toppserien, before returning to Sweden with AIK.

Saari returned to AIK for the 2014 season, having spent 2013 with Mallbackens IF. In December 2015 she agreed a return to Norway, signing a two-year deal with Stabæk Fotball Kvinner.

== International career ==
She made her debut for the senior Finland team on 7 March 2007; playing 90 minutes against Sweden in the Algarve Cup. Saari also played in all four of Finland's matches at UEFA Women's Euro 2009, including the quarter-final defeat to England.

In June 2013 Saari, by then the national team captain, was devastated to be ruled out of UEFA Women's Euro 2013 with a cruciate ligament injury.

== International goals ==
No.	Date	Venue	Opponent	Score	Result	Competition
1.	23 August 2009	Olympic Stadium, Helsinki, Finland	Denmark	1–0	1–0	UEFA Women's Euro 2009
2.	19 September 2009	Hrazdan Stadium, Yerevan, Armenia	Armenia	3–0	4–0	2011 FIFA Women's World Cup qualification
3.	28 October 2009	Estádio João Cardoso, Tondela, Portugal	Portugal	1–0	1–0	2011 FIFA Women's World Cup qualification
4.	22 October 2011	ISS Stadion, Vantaa, Finland	Estonia	2–0	6–0	UEFA Women's Euro 2013 qualifying
5.	22 October 2011	ISS Stadion, Vantaa, Finland	Estonia	6–0	6–0	UEFA Women's Euro 2013 qualifying
6.	15 September 2012	A. Le Coq Arena, Tallinn, Estonia	Estonia	3–0	5–0	UEFA Women's Euro 2013 qualifying
7.	11 March 2013	GSZ Stadium, Larnaca, Cyprus	Switzerland	1–1	2–3	2013 Cyprus Women's Cup
8.	21 August 2014	Lovech Stadium, Lovech, Bulgaria	Bulgaria	3–0	8–0	2015 FIFA Women's World Cup qualification
9.	4 March 2015	GSZ Stadium, Larnaca, Cyprus	England	1–3	1–3	2015 Cyprus Women's Cup
10.	2 March 2016	GSZ Stadium, Larnaca, Cyprus	Wales	2–1	2–2	2016 Cyprus Women's Cup
11.	12 April 2016	Stadion Mitar Mićo Goliš, Petrovac, Montenegro	Montenegro	4–1	7–1	UEFA Women's Euro 2017 qualifying
