= Emmi Alanen =

Finnish footballer and wrestler (born 1991)

Personal information
- Full name: Emmi Alanen
- Date of birth: 30 April 1991 (age 35)
- Place of birth: Lappajärvi, Finland
- Height: 1.62 m (5 ft 4 in)
- Position: Midfielder

Team information
- Current team: Kristianstads DFF
- Number: 10

Senior career*
Years	Team	Apps	(Gls)
	Sport-39		(2)
2009–2010	FC United Pietarsaari	25	(6)
2011	HJK	26	(7)
2012–2013	Kokkola F10	20	(5)
2013–2015	Umeå IK	52	(11)
2016–2018	Vittsjö GIK	50	(6)
2019–2021	Växjö DFF	56	(7)
2022–	Kristianstads DFF	51	(10)

International career^{‡}
2010–2025	Finland	101	(21)
- * Club domestic league appearances and goals as of 16:42, 13 September 2024 (UTC) ‡ National team caps and goals as of 29 August 2023

Emmi Alanen (born 30 April 1991) is a Finnish football midfielder and former wrestler who plays for Swedish Damallsvenskan club Kristianstads DFF.

Before moving to Sweden in 2013, she played for Kokkola F10, Sport-39 Vaasa, FC United Pietarsaari and HJK Helsinki of the Naistenliiga.

== Career ==
=== FC United Pietarsaari ===
Alanen made her league debut against PuiU on 12 September 2009. She scored her first league goal against NiceFutis on 11 October 2009, scoring in the 79th minute.

=== HJK ===
Alanen made her league debut against Åland United on 10 April 2011. She scored her first league goal against Turun Palloseura on 16 April 2011, scoring in the 61st minute. On 3 September 2011, Alanen assisted Sini Vehviläinen in a 4–0 victory over Kokkola F10.

=== Kokkola F10 ===
Alanen made her league debut against HJK on 14 April 2012. She scored her first league goal against FC Honka on 6 October 2012, scoring in the 1st minute.

=== Umeå IK ===
In 2013, Alanen joined Umeå IK. She made her league debut against Mallbackens IF on 31 July 2013. Alanen scored her first league goal against Göteborg FC on 6 October 2013, scoring in the 88th minute.

=== Vittsjö GIK ===
On 27 November 2015, Alanen was announced at Vittsjö GIK. She made her league debut against Kvarnsvedens IK on 17 April 2016. Alanen scored her first league goal against Göteborg FC on 10 July 2016, scoring in the 6th minute.

=== Växjö DFF ===
Alanen joined Växjö DFF from Vittsjö GIK in December 2018. She made her league debut against Linköping FC on 17 April 2019. Alanen scored her first league goal against Eskilstuna United on 28 April 2019, scoring in the 5th minute.

=== Kristianstads DFF ===
On 29 November 2021, Alanen was announced at Kristianstads DFF. She made her league debut against IFK Kalmar on 27 March 2022. Alanen scored her first league goal against Hammarby Fotboll on 16 May 2022, scoring in the 32nd minute.

== International career ==
Alanen made her senior debut for the Finland women's national football team on 19 June 2010, as a substitute in a 4–1 World Cup qualifying win over Portugal in Vantaa. In June 2013 Alanen was named in national coach Andrée Jeglertz's Finland squad for UEFA Women's Euro 2013. Although Finland were eliminated in the group stage, Alanen's midfield performances attracted the attention of Damallsvenskan club Umeå IK who invited her to train with them.

She was called up to the Finland squad for the UEFA Women's Euro 2022.

Alanen was called up for the Finland squad for Euro qualifying matches in July 2024.

Alanen was part of the Finland squad that won the 2023 Cyprus Women's Cup for the first time.

== Wrestling career ==
In addition to football, Lappajärvi-born Alanen was also an international standard wrestler. After a period of injury she decided to focus on football.

== International goals ==
No.	Date	Venue	Opponent	Score	Result	Competition
xx.	5 April 2012	ISS Stadion, Vantaa, Finland	Slovakia	1–0	2–0	2013 UEFA Women's Euro qualification
xx.	14 February 2013	Tammela, Finland	Russia	3–0	5–0	Friendly
xx.	8 March 2013	GSP Stadium, Nicosia, Cyprus	Canada	1–0	1–2	2013 Cyprus Women's Cup
xx.	25 September 2013	Veritas Stadion, Turku, Finland	Austria	2–1	2–1	2015 FIFA Women's World Cup qualification
xx.	14 June 2014	Stadion Wiener Neustadt, Wiener Neustadt, Austria	Austria	1–2	1–3	2015 FIFA Women's World Cup qualification
xx.	18 June 2014	Sonera Stadium, Helsinki, Finland	Bulgaria	1–0	4–0	2015 FIFA Women's World Cup qualification
xx.	21 August 2014	Lovech Stadium, Lovech, Bulgaria	Bulgaria	4–0	8–0	2015 FIFA Women's World Cup qualification
xx.	12 April 2016	Stadion pod Malim brdom, Petrovac, Montenegro	Montenegro	2–1	7–1	2017 UEFA Women's Euro qualification
xx.	3 June 2016	Tehtaan kenttä, Valkeakoski, Finland	Republic of Ireland	1–0	4–1	2017 UEFA Women's Euro qualification
xx.	16 September 2016	Estádio do CD Trofense, Trofa, Portugal	Portugal	1–0	2–3	2017 UEFA Women's Euro qualification
19.	26 November 2017	Bolt Arena, Helsinki, Finland	Israel	3–0	4–0	2019 FIFA Women's World Cup qualification
xx.	5 March 2018	GSZ Stadium, Larnaca, Cyprus	Italy	1–0	2–2	2018 Cyprus Women's Cup
xx.	5 March 2018	GSZ Stadium, Larnaca, Cyprus	Italy	2–1	2–2	2018 Cyprus Women's Cup
xx.	5 March 2018	Paralimni Stadium, Paralimni, Cyprus	Hungary	2–0	2–0	2018 Cyprus Women's Cup
xx.	7 September 2019	Bolt Arena, Helsinki, Finland	Cyprus	2–0	4–0	2022 UEFA Women's Euro qualification
20.	21 October 2021	Mikheil Meskhi Stadium, Tbilisi, Georgia	Georgia	2–0	3–0	2023 FIFA Women's World Cup qualification
21.	12 April 2022	Bolt Arena, Helsinki, Finland	Georgia	1–0	6–0	2023 FIFA Women's World Cup qualification
