= Adelina Engman =

Finnish footballer (born 1994)

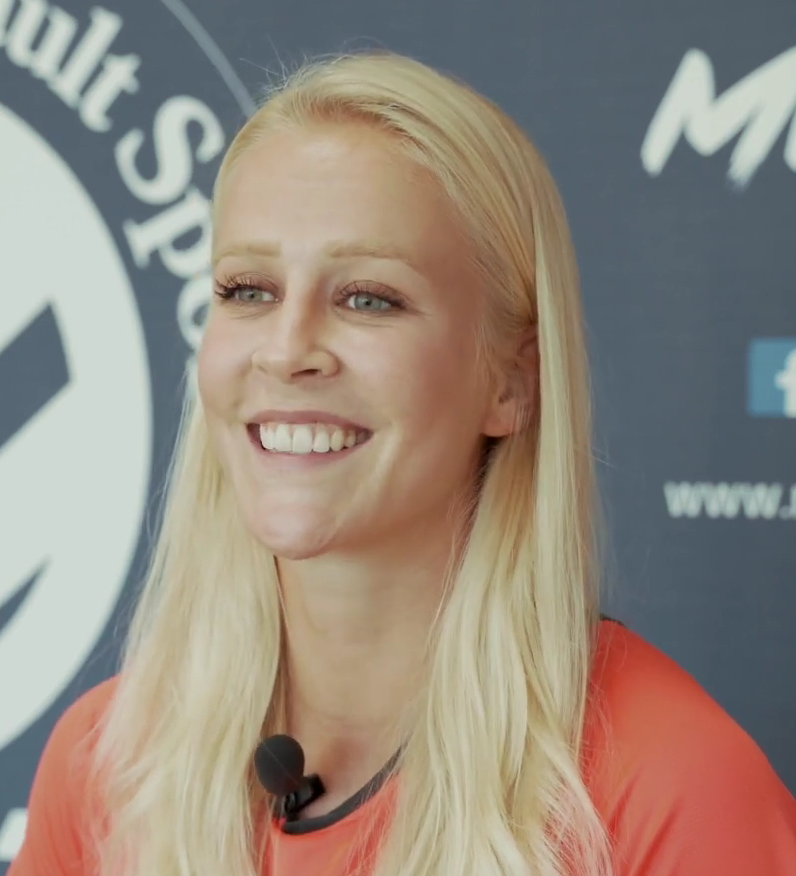
- Engman in 2020

Personal information
- Full name: Adelina Viktoria Engman
- Date of birth: 11 October 1994 (age 32)
- Place of birth: Mariehamn, Finland
- Height: 1.68 m (5 ft 6 in)
- Position: Midfielder

Team information
- Current team: IF Brommapojkarna

Youth career
- IFK Mariehamn

Senior career*
Years	Team	Apps	(Gls)
2009–2014	Åland United	113	(63)
2015–2018	Göteborg FC	70	(12)
2018–2020	Chelsea	13	(3)
2020–2021	Montpellier HSC	16	(1)
2021	Växjö DFF	10	(0)
2022–2024	Hammarby IF	37	(1)
2024	IF Brommapojkarna	10	(1)
2025	Como	9	(0)
2025–	IF Brommapojkarna	20	(1)

International career^{‡}
2011	Finland U-17	3	(0)
2011–2013	Finland U-19	15	(10)
2014	Finland U-20	3	(0)
2012–	Finland	105	(13)
- * Club domestic league appearances and goals as of 21 April 2026 ‡ National team caps and goals as of 15 October 2026

Adelina Viktoria Engman (born 11 October 1994) is a Finnish professional footballer who plays as a midfielder for Damallsvenskan club IF Brommapojkarna and the Finland national team.

== Club career ==
Engman made her debut for Åland United in 2009. In 2015, she moved to Sweden to sign for Damallsvenskan club Kopparbergs/Göteborg FC.

On June 29, 2018, it was announced that Engman would be leaving Kopparbergs/Göteborg FC after three years, to join Chelsea F.C. Women in the upcoming July transfer window.

On 25 November 2021, Engman signed a two-year contract with Hammarby IF.

On 15 February 2024, it was announced that Engman joined IF Brommapojkarna.

== International career ==
In May 2012, Engman made her debut for the senior Finland national team in a match against Belgium.

On 19 June 2025, Engman was called up to the Finland squad for the UEFA Women's Euro 2025, however she missed the tournament due to an injury.

== Career statistics ==
=== International goals ===
Scores and results list Finland's goal tally first:

Engman – goals for Finland
#	Date	Location	Opponent	Score	Result	Competition
1.	25 September 2013	Veritas Stadion, Turku, Finland	Austria	1–0	2–1	2015 FIFA Women's World Cup qualifying
2.	10 April 2014	Sonera Stadium, Helsinki, Finland	Hungary	3–0	4–0	2015 FIFA Women's World Cup qualifying
3.	4 March 2016	Paralimni Stadium, Paralimni, Cyprus	Wales	1–0	2–2	2016 Cyprus Women's Cup
3.	27 February 2019	GSZ Stadium, Larnaca, Cyprus	South Africa	2–1	2–2	2019 Cyprus Women's Cup
4.	23 February 2021	AEK Arena – Georgios Karapatakis, Larnaca, Cyprus	Cyprus	3–0	5–0	UEFA Women's Euro 2022 qualifying
5.	21 September 2021	Turku, Finland	Slovakia	1–0	2–1	2023 FIFA Women's World Cup qualifying
6.	26 October 2021	Helsinki, Finland	Republic of Ireland	1–1	1–2	2023 FIFA Women's World Cup qualifying
7.	12 April 2022	Bolt Arena, Helsinki, Finland	Georgia	3–0	6–0	2023 FIFA Women's World Cup qualifying
8.	27 June 2022	Veritas Stadion, Turku, Finland	Japan	1–1	1–5	Friendly

== Honours ==
Åland United

- Naisten Liiga: 2009, 2013; Runners-up: 2012, 2014

Chelsea

- FA Women's League Cup: 2019-20
- FA Women's Super League: 2019-20

Hammarby

- Damallsvenskan: 2023
- Swedish Cup: 2022–23
