= Nikola Sedláčková =

Czech footballer

Personal information
- Date of birth: 6 September 1990 (age 36)
- Place of birth: Kyjov, Czechoslovakia
- Height: 1.70 m (5 ft 7 in)
- Position: Defender

Team information
- Current team: Slovácko
- Number: 15

Senior career*
Years	Team	Apps	(Gls)
- Slovácko
2017–2020	Slavia Praha	30	(0)
2020–	Slovácko		

International career^{‡}
- Czech Republic
- * Club domestic league appearances and goals as of 19:28, 30 August 2019 (UTC) ‡ National team caps and goals as of 19:28, 30 August 2019 (UTC)

Nikola Sedláčková (born 6 September 1990) is a Czech footballer who plays as a defender and has appeared for the Czech Republic women's national team.

== Career ==
Sedláčková has been capped for the Czech Republic national team, appearing for the team during the 2019 FIFA Women's World Cup qualifying cycle.
