= Riin Emajõe =

Estonian footballer (born 1993)

Personal information
- Full name: Riin Emajõe
- Date of birth: 29 March 1993 (age 33)
- Place of birth: Põltsamaa, Estonia
- Position: Defender

Youth career
- Põltsamaa Tervis

College career
| Years | Team | Apps | (Gls) |
| 2015– | University of Maine | | |

Senior career*
| Years | Team | Apps | (Gls) |
| 2010–2012 | Lootos Põlva | 48 | (4) |
| 2013–2015 | Flora Tallinn | 41 | (0) |

International career
| 2012–2015 | Estonia | 23 | (0) |
- * Club domestic league appearances and goals

Riin Emajõe (born 29 March 1993) is an Estonian football player who plays as a defender. She has made a total of 23 appearances for the Estonia women's national football team.

Her older sister Liis Emajõe is also a football player.
