= Hannes Altrov =

Estonian clarinetist (born 1944)

Hannes Altrov (born 2 January 1944 in Põltsamaa) is an Estonian clarinetist.

In 1968, he graduated from Tallinn State Conservatory.

Since 1967, he has been worked at Estonian National Symphony Orchestra, and since 1977, he is the orchestra's main clarnetist.

Since 1974, he is teaching at Tallinn State Conservatory (later Estonian Academy of Music and Theatre).

Awards:

- 1981 ESSR Honored Worker in Arts
- 2012 Order of the White Star, IV class.
