= Emajõe Business Centre =

Building in Tartu, Estonia

Coordinates: 58°22′43″N 26°43′50″E

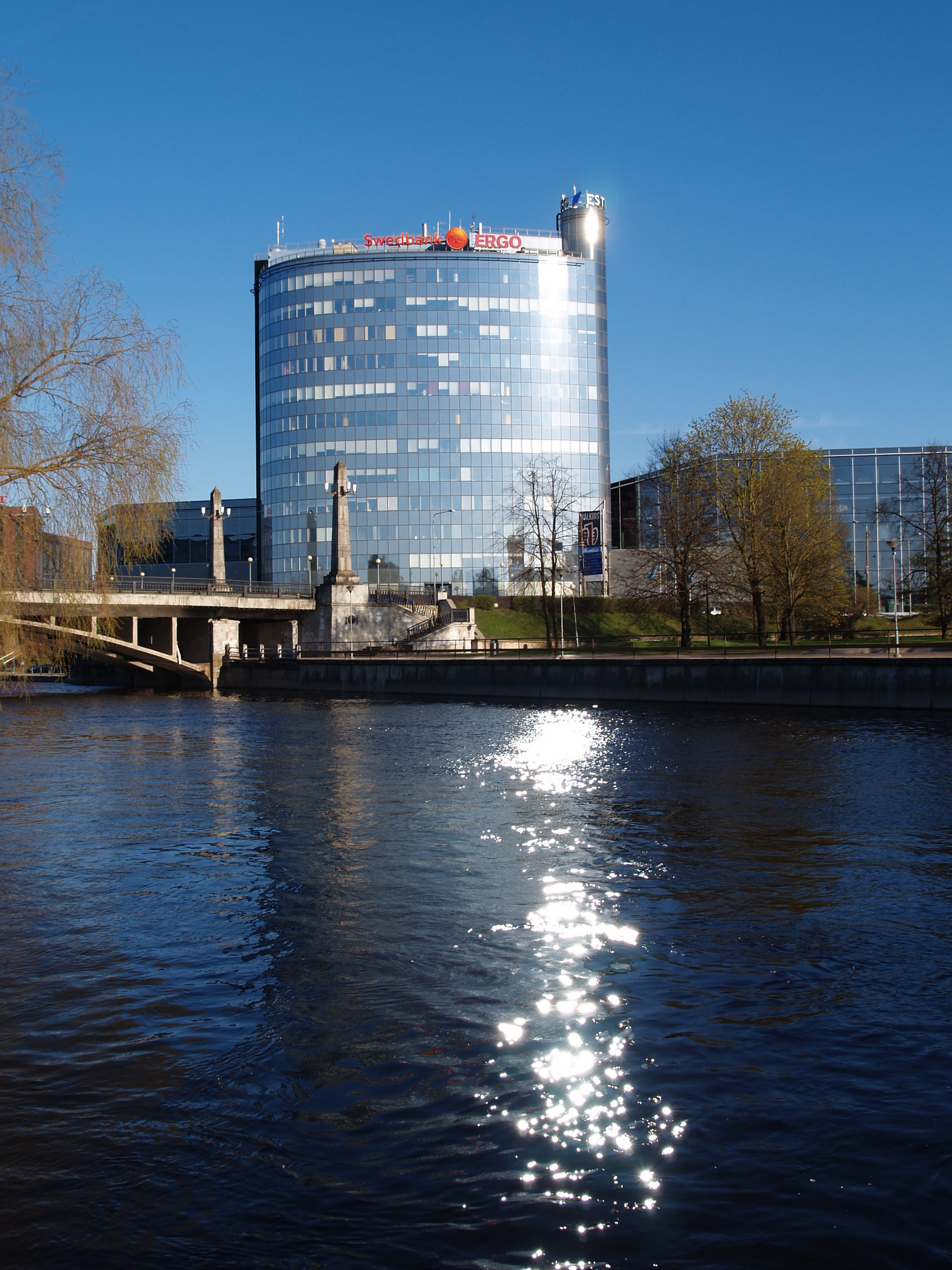
Emajõe Business Centre

Emajõe Business Centre (Estonian: Emajõe ärikeskus, colloquially "Plasku" or "Pläsku") is a business centre in Tartu, Estonia. The centre is located at the Emajõgi river.

The centre was designed by Kalle Rõõmus. The centre was opened in 1998. The centre has 14 storeys and its height is 52 m.
