= Linda Ruutu =

Finnish footballer (born 1990)

Personal information
- Full name: Linda Ruutu
- Date of birth: 17 February 1990 (age 36)
- Place of birth: Finland
- Height: 1.67 m (5 ft 6 in)
- Position: Striker

Team information
- Current team: HJK
- Number: 6

Senior career*
Years	Team	Apps	(Gls)
2009–2012	HJK	23	(10)
2013–2015	PK-35 Vantaa	48	(7)
2017	Grand Bodo	10	(1)
2017–	HJK	32	(7)

International career^{‡}
2014–	Finland	2	(1)
- * Club domestic league appearances and goals as of 10:18, 5 April 2015 (UTC) ‡ National team caps and goals as of 10:18, 5 April 2015 (UTC)

Linda Ruutu (born 17 February 1990) is a Finnish football forward currently playing for PK-35 Vantaa,

== Honours ==
PK-35 Vantaa

Winner

- Naisten Liiga: 2014
- Finnish Women's Cup: 2013

Runners-up

- Naisten Liiga: 2013

HJK

Winner

- Finnish Women's Cup: 2010
- Liiga Cup Naiset (3): 2010, 2011, 2012
