= Dóra Zeller =

Hungarian footballer

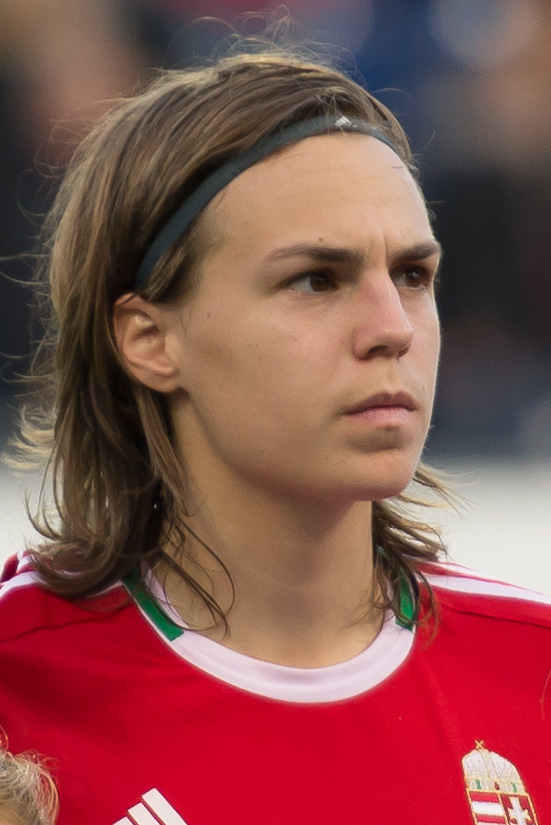
- Dóra Zeller 2014

Personal information
- Full name: Dóra Zeller
- Date of birth: 6 January 1995 (age 31)
- Place of birth: Esztergom, Hungary
- Height: 1.66 m (5 ft 5 1/2 in)
- Position: Forward

Team information
- Current team: 1. FC Köln
- Number: 19

Youth career
- 2006–2009: Nyergesújfalu SE
- 2009–2010: Újpesti TE
- 2010: Ferencváros

Senior career*
Years	Team	Apps	(Gls)
2009–2010	Újpesti TE	14	(6)
2010–2014	Ferencváros	83	(71)
2014–2019	TSG 1899 Hoffenheim	53	(9)
2019–2022	Bayer Leverkusen	59	(11)
2022–2023	BK Häcken	13	(0)
2023–	1. FC Köln	49	(5)

International career^{‡}
2013–	Hungary	93	(34)
- * Club domestic league appearances and goals as of 21 November 2026 ‡ National team caps and goals as of 19:04, 9 October 2026 (UTC)

Dóra Zeller (born 6 January 1995) is a Hungarian professional footballer who plays as a forward for Frauen-Bundesliga club 1. FC Köln and the Hungary national team.

== Career statistics ==
=== International ===
Scores and results list Hungary's goal tally first, score column indicates score after each Zeller goal.

List of international goals scored by Dóra Zeller
No.	Date	Venue	Opponent	Score	Result	Competition
1	12 April 2016	Petrovsky Stadium, Saint Petersburg, Russia	Russia	2–1	3–3	UEFA Women's Euro 2017 qualifying
2	12 November 2019	Rohonci út, Szombathely, Hungary	Latvia	2–0	4–0	UEFA Women's Euro 2022 qualifying
3	22 September 2020	Daugava Stadium, Liepāja, Latvia	Latvia	1–0	5–0	UEFA Women's Euro 2022 qualifying
4	22 September 2020	Daugava Stadium, Liepāja, Latvia	Latvia	2–0	5–0	UEFA Women's Euro 2022 qualifying
5	10 June 2021	Szent Gellért Fórum, Szeged, Hungary	Serbia	1–0	4–0	Friendly
6	26 October 2021	Tórsvøllur, Tórshavn, Faroe Islands	Faroe Islands	3–1	7–1	2023 FIFA Women's World Cup qualification
7	26 October 2021	Tórsvøllur, Tórshavn, Faroe Islands	Faroe Islands	5–1	7–1	2023 FIFA Women's World Cup qualification
8	30 November 2021	Várkerti Stadion, Kisvárda, Hungary	Ukraine	3–0	4–2	2023 FIFA Women's World Cup qualification
9	16 February 2022	La Manga Club Football Stadium, La Manga, Spain	Russia	1–1	2–2 (0–3 p)	2022 Pinatar Cup
10	16 February 2022	La Manga Club Football Stadium, La Manga, Spain	Russia	2–1	2–2 (0–3 p)	2022 Pinatar Cup
11	5 September 2022	Victoria Stadium, Gibraltar	Gibraltar	2–0	12–0	Friendly
12	5 September 2022	Victoria Stadium, Gibraltar	Gibraltar	5–0	12–0	Friendly
13	5 September 2022	Victoria Stadium, Gibraltar	Gibraltar	7–0	12–0	Friendly
14	5 September 2022	Victoria Stadium, Gibraltar	Gibraltar	12–0	12–0	Friendly
15	11 November 2022	Haladás Sportkomplexum, Szombathely, Hungary	Uzbekistan	1–0	3–0	Friendly
16	11 April 2023	Alcufer Stadion, Győr, Hungary	Israel	2–0	2–0	Friendly
17	31 October 2023	Seaview, Belfast, Northern Ireland	Northern Ireland	1–0	1–1	2023–24 UEFA Women's Nations League
18	5 December 2023	Hidegkuti Nándor Stadion, Budapest, Hungary	Albania	6–0	6–0	2023–24 UEFA Women's Nations League
19	31 May 2024	Tissot Arena, Biel/Bienne, Switzerland	Switzerland	1–1	1–2	UEFA Women's Euro 2025 qualifying
20	29 November 2024	Centenary Stadium, Ta'Qali, Malta	Malta	1–0	3–1	Friendly
