= Gabriella Tóth (footballer) =

Hungarian footballer

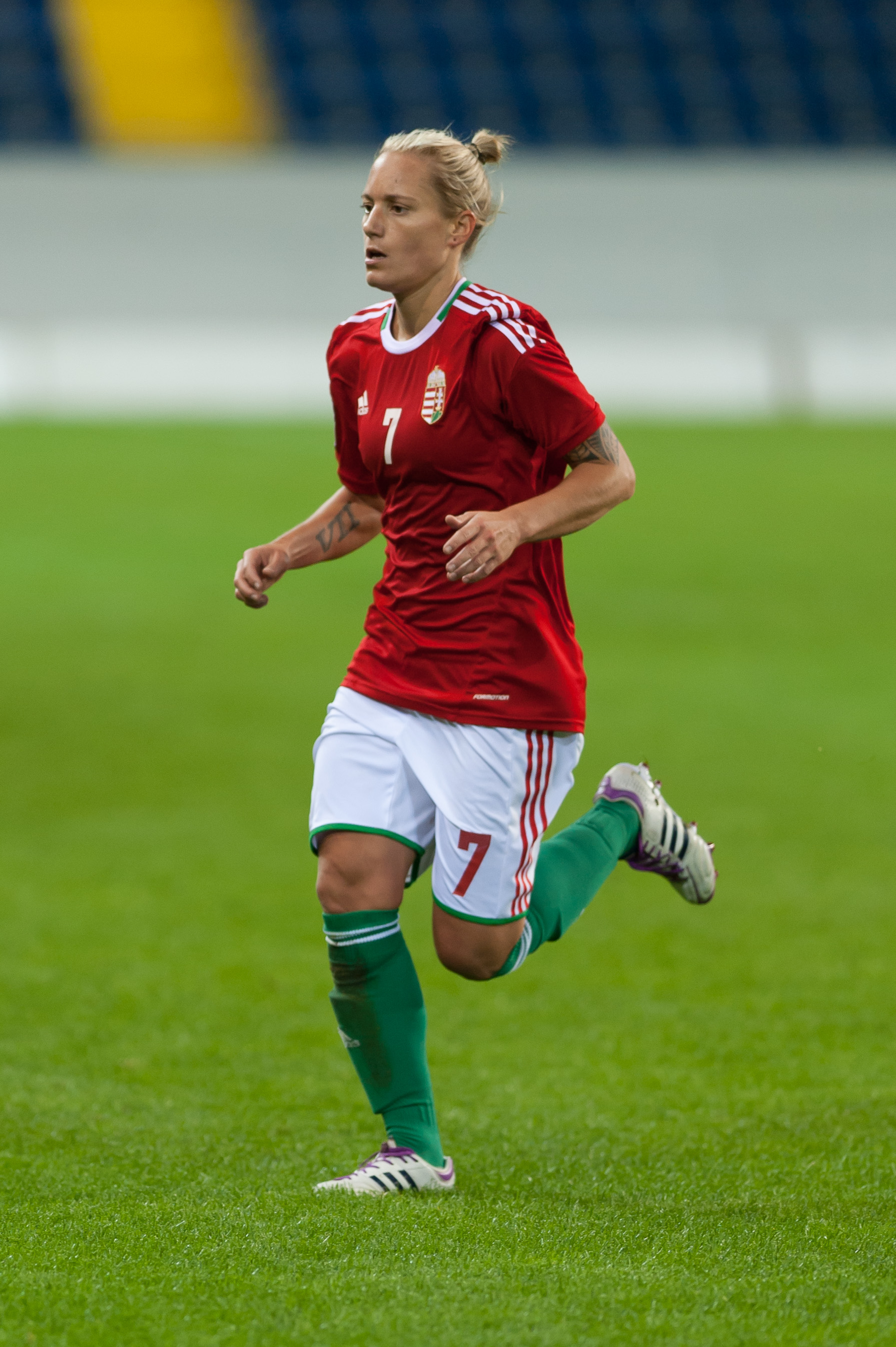
- Tóth with Hungary in 2014

Personal information
- Date of birth: 16 December 1986 (age 39)
- Place of birth: Debrecen, Hungary
- Height: 1.60 m (5 ft 3 in)
- Position: Midfielder

Senior career*
Years	Team	Apps	(Gls)
2001–2004	Debreceni VSC		
2004–2010	Viktória FC-Szombathely		
2010–2013	Lokomotive Leipzig	44	(8)
2013–2015	Lübars	43	(1)
2015–2022	Werder Bremen	133	(6)

International career
2004–?	Hungary	84	(2)
- * Club domestic league appearances and goals

Gabriella Tóth (born 16 December 1986) is a Hungarian former footballer who played as a midfielder, most notably for Werder Bremen in the Bundesliga and the Hungary national team. She retired at the end of the 2021–22 season.

== Honours ==
Viktória FC-Szombathely

- Hungarian League: 2009
- Hungarian Cups: 2008, 2009
