= Jennifer Pöltl =

Austrian footballer

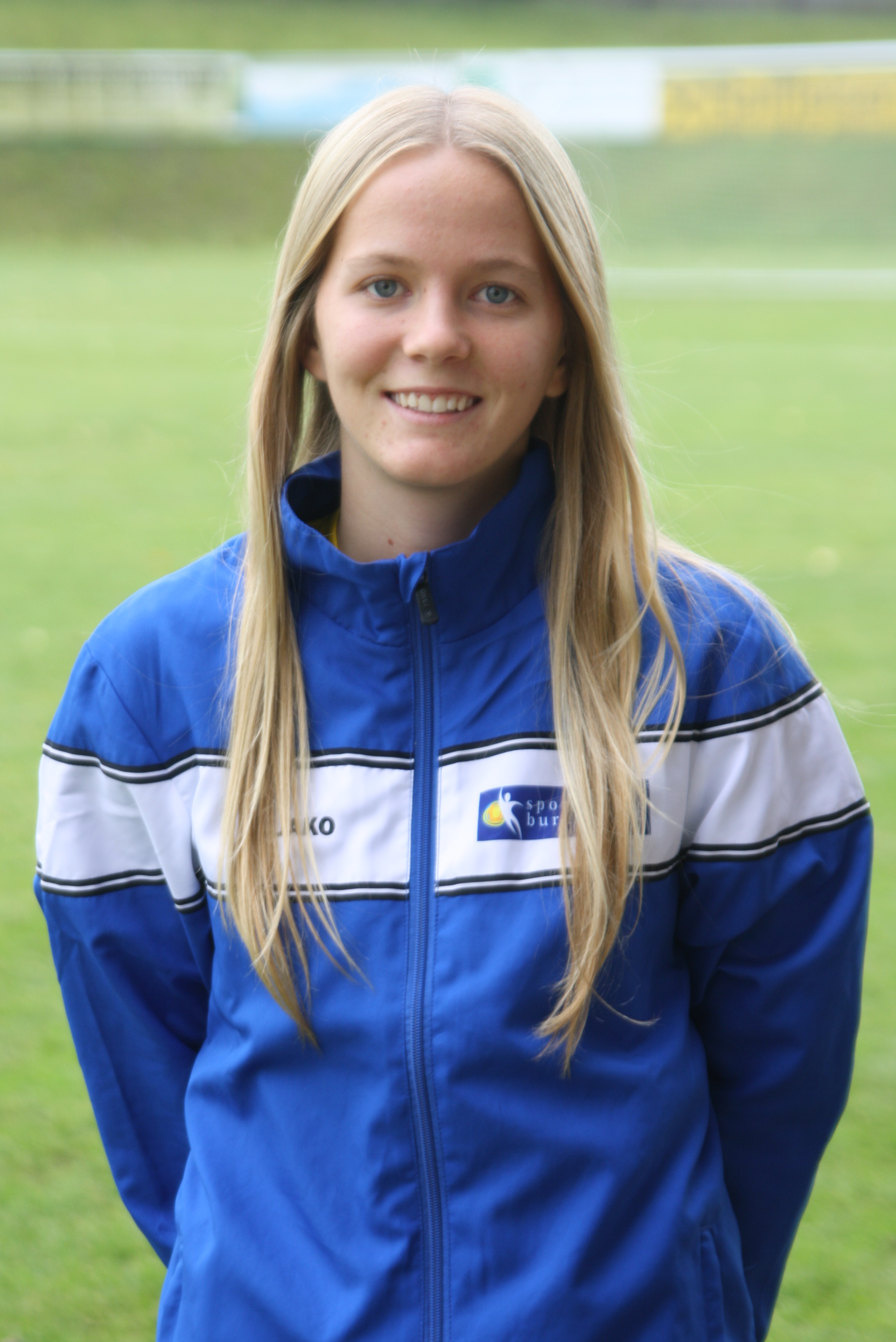

Personal information
- Full name: Jennifer Pöltl
- Date of birth: 4 August 1993 (age 33)
- Place of birth: Austria
- Positions: Defender; midfielder

Team information
- Current team: SKN St. Pölten
- Number: 6

Senior career*
| Years | Team | Apps | (Gls) |
| 2012– | SKN St. Pölten | 0 | (0) |

International career^{‡}
| 2010–2012 | Austria U19 | 11 | (0) |
| 2010– | Austria | 24 | (5) |
- * Club domestic league appearances and goals as of 13:14, 5 April 2015 (UTC) ‡ National team caps and goals as of 13:14, 5 April 2015 (UTC)

Jennifer Pöltl (born 4 August 1993) is an Austrian football midfielder currently playing for SKN St. Pölten in the ÖFB-Frauenliga.

She is a member of the Austrian national team who was part of the 2014 Algarve Cup squad and played 2015 FIFA Women's World Cup qualification matches.
