= Angéla Smuczer =

Hungarian footballer (born 1982)

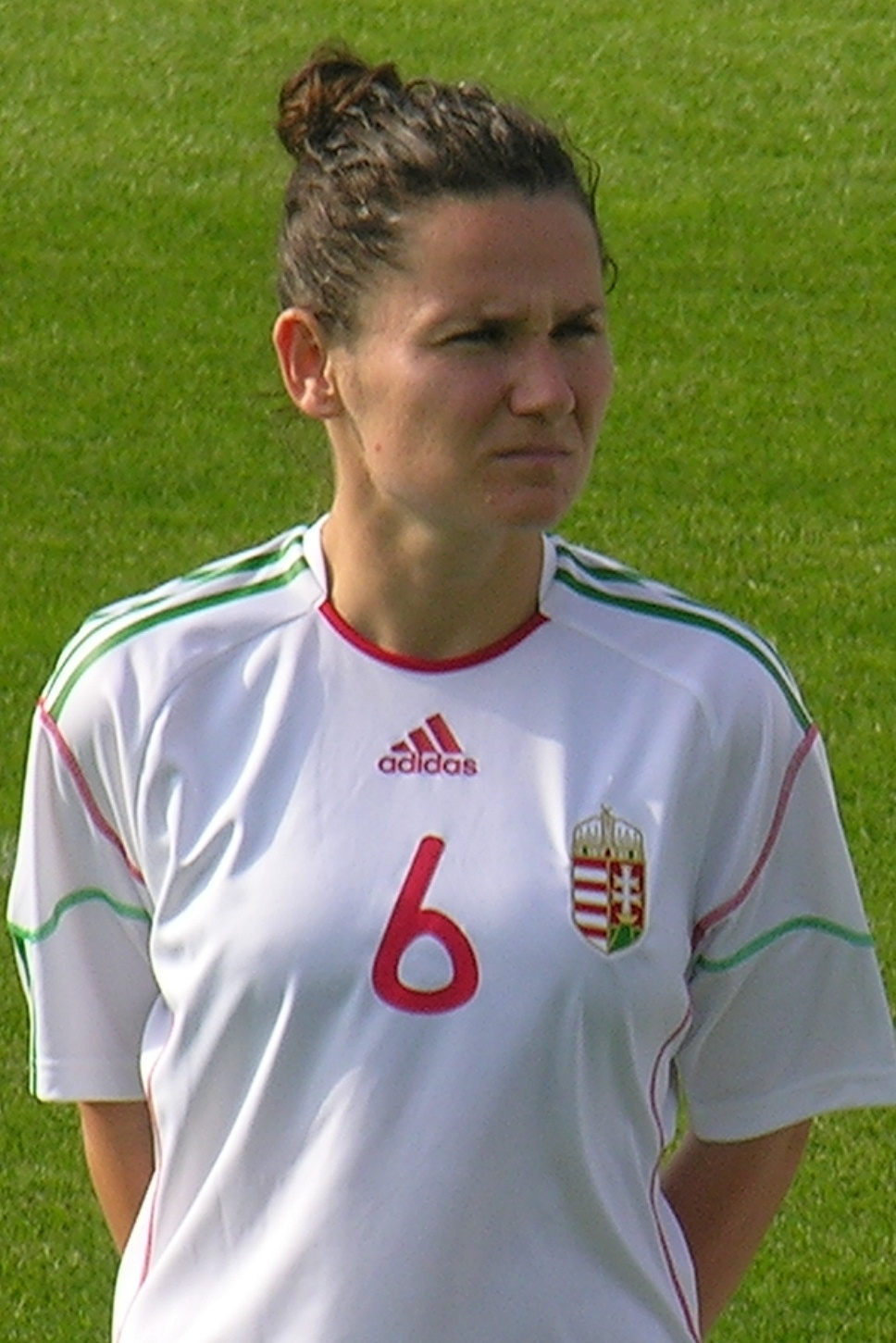
- Smuczer with Hungary in 2012

Personal information
- Date of birth: 11 February 1982 (age 44)
- Place of birth: Eger, Hungary
- Position: Midfielder

Senior career*
| Years | Team | Apps | (Gls) |
- Egri Lendület SC
- Renova Budapest
- Femina Budapest
| 2003–2005 | László Kórház SC | | |
| 2005–2007 | US Compiègne | | |
| 2007–2009 | Femina Budapest | | |
| 2009– | MTK Hungária | | |

International career^{‡}
| 2001–2017 | Hungary | 124 | (3) |
- * Club domestic league appearances and goals ‡ National team caps and goals as of 14 September 2017

Angéla Smuczer (born 11 February 1982) is a Hungarian footballer who plays as a midfielder for Női NB I club MTK Hungária. She has also played in France's Division 1 Féminine for US Compiègne. She is a former member of the Hungary national team.

== Honours ==
- Hungarian Women's League: 2003, 2007, 2008, 2010, 2011, 2012, 2013
- Hungarian Women's Cup: 2004, 2010, 2013
