= Lilla Sipos =

Hungarian footballer

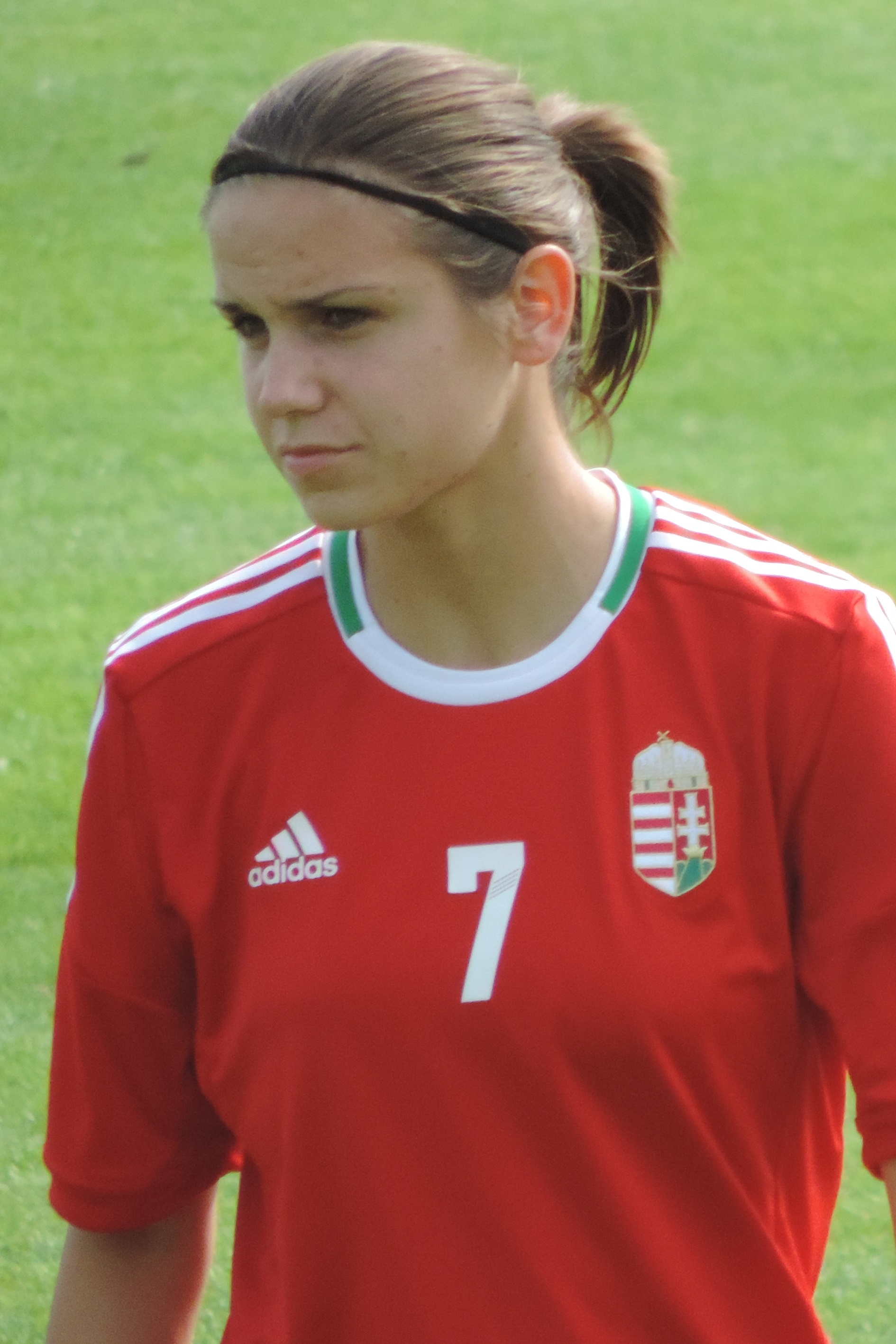

Personal information
- Full name: Lilla Sipos
- Date of birth: 14 July 1992 (age 34)
- Place of birth: Mosonmagyaróvár, Hungary
- Height: 1.80 m (5 ft 11 in)
- Position: Striker

Team information
- Current team: SKN St. Pölten
- Number: 17

Senior career*
Years	Team	Apps	(Gls)
2007–2009	Győri ETO	43	(20)
2009–2010	Ferencváros	28	(19)
2010–2013	Viktória		
2013–2014	FC Südburgenland		
2014–2015	AGSM Verona	25	(14)
2015–	SKN St. Pölten		

International career^{‡}
2009–	Hungary	64	(15)
- * Club domestic league appearances and goals ‡ National team caps and goals as of 19 October 2017

Lilla Sipos (born 14 July 1992) is a Hungarian footballer, who plays as a striker for SKN St. Pölten in the ÖFB-Frauenliga.

She is a member of the Hungarian national team.

== Club career ==
Sipos played for FC Südburgenland of the Austrian ÖFB-Frauenliga and for Viktória FC-Szombathely of the Hungarian 1st Division.

In July 2014 Sipos signed for AGSM Verona in the Italian Serie A.

In 2015, she returned to the Austrian ÖFB-Frauenliga signing with St. Pölten-Spratzern.
