= Liis Emajõe =

Estonian footballer (born 1991)

Personal information
- Full name: Liis Emajõe
- Date of birth: 21 August 1991 (age 35)
- Place of birth: Tallinn, Estonia
- Height: 1.63 m (5 ft 4 in)
- Position: Striker

College career
Years	Team	Apps	(Gls)
2012–2015	Maine Black Bears		

Senior career*
Years	Team	Apps	(Gls)
2008–2009	Lootos Põlva	25	(28)
2010–2013	Flora Tallinn		

International career
2009	Estonia U19	5	(1)
2008–2014	Estonia	34	(2)
- * Club domestic league appearances and goals

Liis Emajõe (born 21 August 1991) is a retired Estonian football player and currently a women's soccer coach for the Maine Black Bears. She played as a striker for Flora Tallinn in the Naiste Meistriliiga, as well as the Estonian national team. In 2010, she was named Estonian Female Young Footballer of the Year.

She scored Estonia's first goal in the 2013 Euro's qualification in a 2–1 loss against Belarus.

Her younger sister Riin Emajõe is also a football player.
