= Sanna Talonen =

Finnish footballer (born 1984)

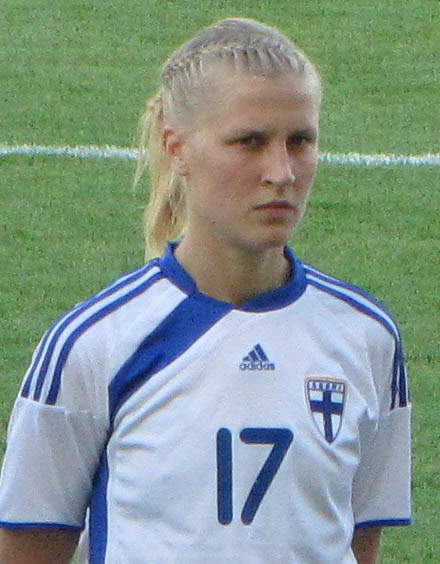

Personal information
- Full name: Sanna Reetta Talonen
- Date of birth: 15 June 1984 (age 42)
- Place of birth: Finland
- Height: 1.70 m (5 ft 7 in)
- Position: Striker

Team information
- Current team: KIF Örebro
- Number: 10

College career
Years	Team	Apps	(Gls)
2007–2008	Florida State Seminoles	46	(34)

Senior career*
Years	Team	Apps	(Gls)
- FC Ilves
2005	FC Honka		
2006	HJK		
2007	Bälinge IF		
2008	Vancouver Whitecaps	8	(3)
2009–2015	KIF Örebro	142	(54)

International career^{‡}
2004–2014	Finland	90	(24)
- * Club domestic league appearances and goals as of 00:17, 17 February 2016 (UTC) ‡ National team caps and goals as of 17:10, 17 July 2013 (UTC)

Sanna Reetta Talonen (born 15 June 1984) is a retired Finnish football forward. She last played in the Swedish Damallsvenskan for KIF Örebro, a club she represented for seven seasons, scoring 54 league goals. She previously played for FC Ilves and FC Honka in Finland's Naisten Liiga and Florida Seminoles and Vancouver Whitecaps in United States' NCAA and W-League respectively.

== International career ==
Talonen made her senior Finland women's national football team debut in March 2004 at a 4–0 defeat to China in the Algarve Cup. Her goalscoring exploits with FC Honka earned Talonen a place in the national squad for UEFA Women's Euro 2005 in North West England. She played in two matches as the Finns reached the semi-final.

At UEFA Women's Euro 2009 in Finland, Talonen featured in the hosts' attack. She was involved in a clash of heads with England's Faye White during Finland's 3–2 quarter-final defeat.

In June 2013 Talonen was named in national coach Andrée Jeglertz's Finland squad for UEFA Women's Euro 2013. At the tournament Talonen played as a centre forward, although she had been playing on the right wing for her club team.
