= Sanna Saarinen =

Finnish footballer (born 1991)

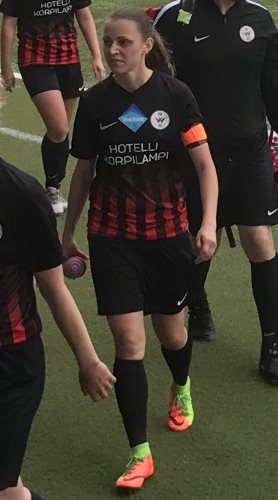

Personal information
- Full name: Sanna Saarinen
- Date of birth: 4 September 1991 (age 35)
- Place of birth: Finland
- Height: 1.65 m (5 ft 5 in)
- Position: Striker

Team information
- Current team: PK-35 Vantaa
- Number: 13

College career
Years	Team	Apps	(Gls)
2010–2011	Tennessee Volunteers	35	(6)

Senior career*
Years	Team	Apps	(Gls)
2010–	PK-35 Vantaa	218	(82)

International career^{‡}
2014–	Finland	5	(2)
- * Club domestic league appearances and goals as of 10:48, 5 April 2015 (UTC) ‡ National team caps and goals as of 23:55, 5 July 2022 (UTC)

Sanna Saarinen (born 4 September 1991) is a Finnish football forward currently playing for PK-35 Vantaa.

== Honours ==
PK-35 Vantaa

Winner

- Finnish Championship (4): 2010, 2011, 2012, 2014
- Finnish Women's Cup (2): 2012, 2013

Runners-up

- Finnish Championship: 2013
