= 2008 Naisten Liiga =

Naisten Liiga
- Season: 2008
- Champions: FC Honka
- Relegated: FC Sport
- Top goalscorer: Nina Hietanen (18 goals)

The 2008 Naisten Liiga, part of the 2008 Finnish football season, was the second season of the 2006 established Naisten Liiga. FC Honka were the defending champions, having won the 2007 season. SC Raisio withdrew from the league and was replaced by TPS Turku.

== Teams ==
Team	Location	Stadium
FC Honka	Espoo	Tapiolan Urheilupuisto
FC Ilves	Tampere	Tammela Stadion
FC Kontu	Helsinki	Kontulan liikuntapuisto
FC Kuusysi	Lahti	Radiomäen urheilukenttä
FC Sport	Vaasa	Kaarlen kenttä
HJK	Helsinki	Töölön Pallokenttä
KMF	Kuopio	Kuopio Football Stadium
NiceFutis	Pori	Pori Stadium
PuiU	Helsinki	Puistolan liikuntapuisto
TPS Turku	Turku	Turun urheilupuisto
TiPS	Vantaa	Tikkurilan urheilupuisto
Åland United	Lemland	Bengtsböle IP

== League table ==
Pos	Team	Pld	W	D	L	GF	GA	GD	Pts	Qualification or relegation
1	FC Honka	22	20	2	0	86	17	+69	62	2009–10 UEFA Women's Champions League Round of 32
2	HJK	22	15	4	3	68	27	+41	49	
3	KMF	22	13	4	5	48	24	+24	43	
4	PuiU	22	11	6	5	36	27	+9	39	
5	FC Kontu	22	8	7	7	34	32	+2	31	
6	FC Kuusysi	22	9	2	11	43	59	−16	29	
7	TPS Turku	22	7	3	12	38	53	−15	24	
8	Åland United	22	7	3	12	31	46	−15	24	
9	NiceFutis	22	7	3	12	29	47	−18	24	
10	FC Ilves	22	5	4	13	26	43	−17	19	
11	TiPS	22	5	2	15	18	50	−32	17	Relegation play-offs
12	FC Sport (R)	22	3	4	15	23	55	−32	13	Relegation to Naisten Ykkönen

(R) Relegated

=== Relegation play-offs ===
25 October 2008

KPV	0 – 0	TiPS

Keskuskenttä, Kokkola

1 November 2008

TiPS	4 – 3 pen. 0 – 0 (aet.)	KPV

Tikkurilan urheilupuisto, Vantaa

TiPS won 4–3 on aggregate.

== Top scorers ==
Pos.	Player	Club	Goals
1.	(Finland) Nina Hietanen	FC Kuusysi	18
2.	(Finland) Maiju Ruotsalainen	FC Honka	16
3.	(Finland) Anna Auvinen	NiceFutis	15
3.	(Equatorial Guinea) Theresa Gomina	KMF	15
3.	(Finland) Jaana Lyytikäinen	FC Honka	15
6.	(Finland) Tytti Porkka	HJK	14
6.	(United States) Shannon Schneeman	FC Kontu	14
8.	(Finland) Hanna Saaranen	FC Honka	13
8.	(Finland) Tiia Tikkanen	TPS Turku	13
10.	(Finland) Anna Helenius	FC Honka	12

== Personal awards ==
- Top scorer: Nina Hietanen, FC Kuusysi
- Player of the year: Jaana Lyytikäinen, FC Honka
- Referee of the year: Kirsi Savolainen

== Sources ==
- Finland - List of Women League First Level Tables Rec.Sport.Soccer Statistics Foundation
