= 2007 Naisten Liiga =

Naisten Liiga
- Season: 2007
- Champions: FC Honka
- Top goalscorer: Taru Laihanen (21 goals)

The 2007 Naisten Liiga, part of the 2007 Finnish football season, was the first season of the 2006 established Naisten Liiga. FC Honka were the defending Finnish champions, having won the 2006 Naisten SM-sarja (The Championship Series) season.

== Teams ==
Team	Location	Stadium
FC Honka	Espoo	Tapiolan Urheilupuisto
FC Ilves	Tampere	Tammela Stadion
FC Sport	Vaasa	Kaarlen kenttä
FC United	Jakobstad	Jakobstads Centralplan
HJK	Helsinki	Töölön Pallokenttä
KMF	Kuopio	Kuopio Football Stadium
PuiU	Helsinki	Puistolan liikuntapuisto
SC Raisio	Raisio	Kerttulan liikuntakeskus
TiPS	Vantaa	Tikkurilan urheilupuisto
Åland United	Lemland	Bengtsböle IP

== Preliminary stage ==
Pos	Team	Pld	W	D	L	GF	GA	GD	Pts	Qualification
1	FC Honka	18	16	1	1	56	9	+47	49	Championship group
2	HJK	18	15	2	1	57	19	+38	47	Championship group
3	Åland United	18	8	4	6	22	24	−2	28	Championship group
4	FC Ilves	18	9	0	9	22	22	0	27	Championship group
5	PuiU	18	7	4	7	21	21	0	25	Championship group
6	TiPS	18	4	7	7	20	24	−4	19	Relegation group
7	KMF	18	5	2	11	17	35	−18	17	Relegation group
8	FC Sport	18	4	4	10	10	29	−19	16	Relegation group
9	FC United	18	4	3	11	17	36	−19	15	Relegation group
10	SC Raisio	18	3	3	12	14	37	−23	12	Relegation group

== Championship group ==
- Note: Matches and points of Preliminary stage are counted

Pos	Team	Pld	W	D	L	GF	GA	GD	Pts	Qualification
1	FC Honka	22	19	2	1	71	12	+59	59	2008–09 UEFA Women's Cup First Qualifying round
2	HJK	22	18	3	1	70	23	+47	57	
3	PuiU	22	9	4	9	25	25	0	31	
4	Åland United	22	9	4	9	27	38	−11	31	
5	FC Ilves	22	9	0	13	22	34	−12	27	

== Relegation group ==
- Note: Matches and points of Preliminary stage are counted

Pos	Team	Pld	W	D	L	GF	GA	GD	Pts	Relegation
1	TiPS	22	6	8	8	25	28	−3	26	
2	FC Sport	22	5	6	11	14	33	−19	21	
3	SC Raisio	22	6	3	13	23	43	−20	21	
4	KMF	22	6	3	13	22	42	−20	21	
5	FC United (R)	22	5	3	14	21	42	−21	18	Relegation to Naisten Ykkönen

(R) Relegated

== Top scorers ==
Pos.	Player	Club	Goals
1.	(Finland) Taru Laihanen	FC Honka	21
2.	(Finland) Jessica Thorn	HJK	15
3.	(Finland) Hanna Saaranen	FC Honka	11
4.	(Finland) Anna Auvinen	KMF	9
4.	(Finland) Eveliina Sarapää	FC Honka	9
4.	(Finland) Annica Sjölund	Åland United	9
7.	(Finland) Leena Puranen	HJK	8
8.	(Finland) Satu Kruus	FC Honka	7
8.	(Finland) Mathilda Mörn	Åland United	7
8.	(Finland) Linda Sällström	TiPS	7

== Personal awards ==
- Top scorer: Taru Laihanen, FC Honka
- Player of the year: Eveliina Sarapää, FC Honka
- Referee of the year: Kirsi Heikkinen

== Sources ==
- Finland - List of Women League First Level Tables Rec.Sport.Soccer Statistics Foundation
- Top scorers 2006-12 Naisten Liiga (in Finnish)
