= 2022 Tournoi de France squads =

2nd edition of the Tournoi de France

The 2022 Tournoi de France was the 2nd edition of the Tournoi de France, an international women's football tournament, consisting of a series of friendly games, that was held in France from 16 to 22 February 2022. The four national teams involved in the tournament registered a squad of 23 players.

The age listed for each player is on 16 February 2022, the first day of the tournament. The numbers of caps and goals listed for each player do not include any matches played after the start of tournament. The club listed is the club for which the player last played a competitive match prior to the tournament. The nationality for each club reflects the national association (not the league) to which the club is affiliated. A flag is included for coaches that are of a different nationality than their own national team.

== Squads ==
=== Brazil ===
Coach: (Sweden) Pia Sundhage

The 23-player squad was announced on 1 February 2022. Two weeks later, Júlia and Bia Zaneratto withdrew from the squad due to COVID-19 and Ludmila, Ana Vitória, and Lauren were called-up to replace them.

No.	Pos.	Player	Date of birth (age)	Caps	Goals	Club
1	GK	Lorena	6 May 1997 (aged 24)			(Brazilian Football Confederation) Grêmio
2	DF	Letícia Santos	2 December 1994 (aged 27)			(German Football Association) Eintracht Frankfurt
3	DF	Daiane	7 September 1997 (aged 24)			(Royal Spanish Football Federation) Madrid CFF
4	DF	Rafaelle	18 June 1991 (aged 30)			(The Football Association) Arsenal
5	MF	Ana Vitória	6 March 2000 (aged 21)			(Portuguese Football Federation) Benfica
6	DF	Tamires	10 October 1987 (aged 34)			(Brazilian Football Confederation) Corinthians
7	MF	Duda	18 July 1995 (aged 26)			(Brazilian Football Confederation) Flamengo
8	MF	Angelina	26 January 2000 (aged 22)			(United States Soccer Federation) OL Reign
9	FW	Debinha	20 October 1991 (aged 30)			(United States Soccer Federation) North Carolina Courage
10	FW	Marta	19 February 1986 (aged 35)			(United States Soccer Federation) Orlando Pride
11	MF	Adriana	17 November 1996 (aged 25)			(Brazilian Football Confederation) Corinthians
12	GK	Jully	18 April 1999 (aged 22)			(Brazilian Football Confederation) Palmeiras
13	DF	Antônia	26 April 1994 (aged 27)			(Royal Spanish Football Federation) Madrid CFF
14	FW	Gio Costa	21 June 2003 (aged 18)			(Royal Spanish Football Federation) Levante
15	DF	Tainara	21 April 1999 (aged 22)			(French Football Federation) Bordeaux
16	FW	Ludmila	1 December 1994 (aged 27)			(Royal Spanish Football Federation) Atlético Madrid
17	MF	Ary	28 December 1999 (aged 22)			(Brazilian Football Confederation) Palmeiras
18	FW	Geyse	27 March 1998 (aged 23)			(Royal Spanish Football Federation) Madrid CFF
19	DF	Thaís Regina	27 March 1999 (aged 22)			(Brazilian Football Confederation) São Paulo
20	DF	Fe Palermo	18 August 1996 (aged 25)			(Brazilian Football Confederation) São Paulo
21	MF	Kerolin	17 November 1999 (aged 22)			(United States Soccer Federation) North Carolina Courage
22	GK	Letícia Izidoro	13 August 1994 (aged 27)			(Portuguese Football Federation) Benfica
23	MF	Luana	2 May 1993 (aged 28)			(French Football Federation) Paris Saint-Germain
24	DF	Lauren	13 September 2002 (aged 19)			(Royal Spanish Football Federation) Madrid CFF

=== Finland ===
Coach: (Sweden) Anna Signeul

The 22-player squad was announced on 8 February 2022. Two days later, Vilma Koivisto, Heidi Kollanen, and Amanda Rantanen were added to the squad. On 15 February 2022, Katariina Kosola was added to the squad. Two days later, it was confirmed that Emmi Alanen withdrew from the squad due to illness.

No.	Pos.	Player	Date of birth (age)	Caps	Goals	Club
1	GK	Paula Myllyoja	20 April 1984 (aged 37)	5	0	(Royal Spanish Football Federation) Espanyol
2	DF	Elli Pikkujämsä	24 October 1999 (aged 22)	10	0	(Swedish Football Association) KIF Örebro
3	DF	Tuija Hyyrynen	10 March 1988 (aged 33)	115	2	(Italian Football Federation) Juventus
4	MF	Ria Öling	15 September 1994 (aged 27)	52	9	(Swedish Football Association) Rosengård
5	MF	Emma Koivisto	25 September 1994 (aged 27)	68	3	(The Football Association) Brighton & Hove Albion
6	DF	Anna Auvinen	2 March 1987 (aged 34)	17	0	(Italian Football Federation) Sampdoria
7	FW	Adelina Engman	11 October 1994 (aged 27)	77	10	(Swedish Football Association) Hammarby
8	MF	Olga Ahtinen	15 August 1997 (aged 24)	36	3	(Swedish Football Association) Linköping
9	FW	Juliette Kemppi	14 May 1994 (aged 27)	59	5	(Swedish Football Association) Kalmar
10	MF	Katariina Kosola	24 February 2001 (aged 20)	0	0	(Football Association of Finland) HJK
11	MF	Nora Heroum	20 July 1994 (aged 27)	80	1	(Italian Football Federation) Lazio
12	GK	Milla-Maj Majasaari	15 October 1999 (aged 22)	0	0	(Swedish Football Association) AIK
13	FW	Jenny Danielsson	30 August 1994 (aged 27)	30	6	(Swedish Football Association) AIK
14	DF	Eva Nyström	24 November 1992 (aged 29)	0	0	(Swedish Football Association) Hammarby
15	MF	Natalia Kuikka	1 December 1995 (aged 26)	63	3	(United States Soccer Federation) Portland Thorns
16	DF	Anna Westerlund	9 April 1989 (aged 32)	137	4	(Football Association of Finland) Åland United
17	FW	Sanni Franssi	19 March 1995 (aged 26)	52	3	(Royal Spanish Football Federation) Real Sociedad
18	FW	Linda Sällström	13 July 1988 (aged 33)	113	50	(Swedish Football Association) Vittsjö
19	FW	Heidi Kollanen	6 June 1997 (aged 24)	13	2	(Swedish Football Association) KIF Örebro
20	MF	Eveliina Summanen	29 May 1998 (aged 23)	34	5	(The Football Association) Tottenham Hotspur
21	MF	Iina Salmi	12 October 1994 (aged 27)	13	1	(Royal Spanish Football Federation) Valencia
22	FW	Jutta Rantala	11 November 1999 (aged 22)	4	1	(Swedish Football Association) Vittsjö
23	GK	Tinja-Riikka Korpela	15 May 1986 (aged 35)	102	0	(The Football Association) Tottenham Hotspur
24	FW	Amanda Rantanen	11 May 1998 (aged 23)	7	1	(Swedish Football Association) KIF Örebro
25	MF	Vilma Koivisto	21 November 2002 (aged 19)	1	0	(Swedish Football Association) Umeå

=== France ===
Coach: Corinne Diacre

The 25-player squad was announced on 8 February 2022.

No.	Pos.	Player	Date of birth (age)	Caps	Goals	Club
1	GK	Solène Durand	20 November 1994 (aged 27)	1	0	(French Football Federation) Dijon
2	DF	Ève Périsset	24 December 1994 (aged 27)	30	3	(French Football Federation) Bordeaux
3	DF	Wendie Renard	20 July 1990 (aged 31)	126	29	(French Football Federation) Lyon
4	DF	Marion Torrent	17 April 1992 (aged 29)	40	1	(French Football Federation) Montpellier
5	DF	Aïssatou Tounkara	16 March 1995 (aged 26)	29	2	(Royal Spanish Football Federation) Atlético Madrid
6	MF	Sandie Toletti	13 July 1995 (aged 26)	22	1	(Royal Spanish Football Federation) Levante
7	DF	Sakina Karchaoui	26 January 1996 (aged 26)	43	0	(French Football Federation) Paris Saint-Germain
8	MF	Grace Geyoro	2 July 1997 (aged 24)	45	7	(French Football Federation) Paris Saint-Germain
9	FW	Marie-Antoinette Katoto	1 November 1998 (aged 23)	23	19	(French Football Federation) Paris Saint-Germain
10	MF	Kheira Hamraoui	13 January 1990 (aged 32)	36	3	(French Football Federation) Paris Saint-Germain
11	FW	Kadidiatou Diani	1 April 1995 (aged 26)	67	16	(French Football Federation) Paris Saint-Germain
12	FW	Melvine Malard	28 June 2000 (aged 21)	8	2	(French Football Federation) Lyon
13	DF	Selma Bacha	9 November 2000 (aged 21)	2	1	(French Football Federation) Lyon
14	MF	Charlotte Bilbault	5 June 1990 (aged 31)	39	1	(French Football Federation) Bordeaux
15	MF	Kenza Dali	31 July 1991 (aged 30)	39	9	(The Football Association) Everton
16	GK	Mylène Chavas	7 January 1998 (aged 24)	0	0	(French Football Federation) Bordeaux
17	FW	Sandy Baltimore	19 February 2000 (aged 21)	8	2	(French Football Federation) Paris Saint-Germain
18	MF	Viviane Asseyi	20 November 1993 (aged 28)	53	12	(German Football Association) Bayern Munich
19	DF	Griedge Mbock Bathy	26 February 1995 (aged 26)	62	6	(French Football Federation) Lyon
20	FW	Delphine Cascarino	5 February 1997 (aged 25)	36	8	(French Football Federation) Lyon
21	GK	Pauline Peyraud-Magnin	17 March 1992 (aged 29)	21	0	(Italian Football Federation) Juventus
22	FW	Clara Matéo	28 November 1997 (aged 24)	6	1	(French Football Federation) Paris FC
23	DF	Hawa Cissoko	10 April 1997 (aged 24)	4	0	(The Football Association) West Ham United
24	DF	Julie Thibaud	20 April 1998 (aged 23)	0	0	(French Football Federation) Bordeaux
25	FW	Ouleymata Sarr	8 October 1995 (aged 26)	13	3	(French Football Federation) Paris FC

=== Netherlands ===
Coach: (England) Mark Parsons

The 27-player squad was announced on 8 February 2022. The following week, Dominique Janssen, Jill Roord, Lynn Wilms, and Renate Jansen withdrew from the squad due to COVID-19 protocols and were replaced by Lisa Doorn, Chasity Grant, Kayleigh van Dooren, and Janou Levels.

No.	Pos.	Player	Date of birth (age)	Caps	Goals	Club
1	GK	Sari van Veenendaal (captain)	3 April 1990 (aged 31)	83	0	(Royal Dutch Football Association) PSV
2	DF	Aniek Nouwen	9 March 1999 (aged 22)	24	1	(The Football Association) Chelsea
3	DF	Stefanie van der Gragt	16 August 1992 (aged 29)	83	11	(Royal Dutch Football Association) Ajax
4	DF	Merel van Dongen	11 February 1993 (aged 29)	57	2	(Royal Spanish Football Federation) Atlético Madrid
5	DF	Kika van Es	11 October 1991 (aged 30)	74	0	(Royal Dutch Football Association) Twente
6	MF	Kayleigh van Dooren	31 July 1999 (aged 22)	0	0	(Royal Dutch Football Association) Twente
8	MF	Sherida Spitse	29 May 1990 (aged 31)	194	42	(Royal Dutch Football Association) Ajax
9	FW	Vivianne Miedema	15 July 1996 (aged 25)	104	85	(The Football Association) Arsenal
10	MF	Victoria Pelova	3 June 1999 (aged 22)	20	2	(Royal Dutch Football Association) Ajax
11	MF	Lieke Martens	16 December 1992 (aged 29)	131	54	(Royal Spanish Football Federation) Barcelona
12	FW	Katja Snoeijs	31 August 1996 (aged 25)	11	7	(French Football Federation) Bordeaux
13	FW	Chasity Grant	19 April 2001 (aged 20)	0	0	(Royal Dutch Football Association) Ajax
14	MF	Jackie Groenen	17 December 1994 (aged 27)	79	8	(The Football Association) Manchester United
15	DF	Caitlin Dijkstra	30 January 1999 (aged 23)	1	0	(Royal Dutch Football Association) Twente
16	GK	Daphne van Domselaar	6 March 2000 (aged 21)	0	0	(Royal Dutch Football Association) Twente
17	DF	Lisa Doorn	8 December 2000 (aged 21)	1	0	(Royal Dutch Football Association) Ajax
18	MF	Kerstin Casparij	19 August 2000 (aged 21)	3	0	(Royal Dutch Football Association) Twente
19	MF	Marisa Olislagers	9 September 2000 (aged 21)	1	0	(Royal Dutch Football Association) Twente
20	DF	Janou Levels	30 October 2000 (aged 21)	1	0	(Royal Dutch Football Association) PSV
21	FW	Lineth Beerensteyn	11 October 1996 (aged 25)	74	15	(German Football Association) Bayern Munich
22	MF	Jill Baijings	23 February 2001 (aged 20)	2	0	(German Football Association) SGS Essen
23	GK	Barbara Lorsheyd	26 March 1991 (aged 30)	1	0	(Royal Dutch Football Association) ADO Den Haag
24	DF	Samantha van Diemen	28 January 2002 (aged 20)	1	0	(Royal Dutch Football Association) Feyenoord
26	FW	Esmee Brugts	28 July 2003 (aged 18)	0	0	(Royal Dutch Football Association) PSV
27	FW	Romée Leuchter	12 January 2001 (aged 21)	0	0	(Royal Dutch Football Association) Ajax
	GK	Loes Geurts	12 January 1986 (aged 36)	125	0	(Swedish Football Association) Häcken
	FW	Joëlle Smits	7 February 2000 (aged 22)	8	1	(German Football Association) VfL Wolfsburg

== Player representation ==
=== By club ===
Clubs with three or more players represented are listed.

Players	Club
7	(France) Paris Saint-Germain
6	(France) Bordeaux, (Netherlands) Ajax, (Netherlands) Twente
5	(France) Lyon
4	(Spain) Madrid CFF
3	(Netherlands) PSV, (Spain) Atlético Madrid, (Sweden) KIF Örebro

=== By club nationality ===
Players	Clubs
22	France
17	Netherlands
14	Sweden
13	Spain
9	England
8	Brazil
5	Germany, United States
4	Italy
2	Finland, Portugal

=== By club federation ===
Players	Federation
88	UEFA
8	CONMEBOL
5	CONCACAF

=== By representatives of domestic league ===
National squad	Players
France	19
Netherlands	17
Brazil	8
Finland	2
