= 2013 Naisten Liiga =

Naisten Liiga
- Season: 2013
- Champions: Åland United
- Relegated: GBK Kokkola
- Top goalscorer: Cynthia Uwak (18 goals)

The 2013 Naisten Liiga, part of the 2013 Finnish football season, was the 7th season of the Finnish women's premier division Naisten Liiga since its establishment in 2007. The season started on 23 March 2013 and ended on 19 October 2013. Åland United were the defending champions, having won their first Finnish championship in 2012.

The season featured 10 teams. After 18 matches played, the league was divided to Championship Group of six and Relegation Group of four. The Champion, Åland United, qualified for the first qualifying round of the 2014–15 UEFA Women's Champions League and GBK Kokkola was relegated to the Naisten Ykkönen for the 2014 season. Merilappi United was promoted.

== Teams ==
Team	Location	Stadium	Manager
FC Honka	Espoo	Tapiolan Urheilupuisto	(Finland) Timo Lounio
GBK Kokkola	Kokkola	Kokkolan keskuskenttä	(Finland) Håkan Nyman
HJK	Helsinki	Töölön Pallokenttä	(Finland) Maria Virolainen
Kokkola Futis 10	Kokkola	Kokkolan keskuskenttä	(Finland) Michael Käld
NiceFutis	Pori	Pori Stadium	(Finland) Sami Rintanen (Poland) Boguslaw Plich (since 3 June)
ONS	Oulu	Castrén Stadium	(Finland) Mauri Holappa
Pallokissat	Kuopio	Savon Sanomat Areena	(Finland) Pasi Tuutti
PK-35	Vantaa	ISS Stadion	(Finland) Pauliina Miettinen
TPS	Turku	Turun yläkenttä	(Finland) Jouni Alen
Åland United	Lemland	Bengtsböle IP	(England) Gary Williams

== Preliminary stage ==
Pos	Team	Pld	W	D	L	GF	GA	GD	Pts	Qualification
1	Åland United	18	15	2	1	66	13	+53	47	Championship group
2	PK-35	18	12	3	3	42	20	+22	39	Championship group
3	FC Honka	18	12	2	4	39	16	+23	38	Championship group
4	HJK	18	8	5	5	33	31	+2	29	Championship group
5	Pallokissat	18	6	4	8	28	32	−4	22	Championship group
6	Kokkola Futis 10	18	7	1	10	27	32	−5	22	Championship group
7	TPS	18	5	4	9	22	24	−2	19	Relegation group
8	ONS	18	5	4	9	25	49	−24	19	Relegation group
9	GBK	18	2	4	12	17	47	−30	10	Relegation group
10	NiceFutis	18	2	3	13	13	48	−35	9	Relegation group

== Championship group ==
- Note: Matches and points of Preliminary stage are counted

Pos	Team	Pld	W	D	L	GF	GA	GD	Pts	Qualification
1	Åland United	23	19	3	1	85	16	+69	60	2015–16 UEFA Women's Champions League Qualifying round
2	PK-35	23	16	4	3	58	24	+34	52	
3	FC Honka	23	15	2	6	51	23	+28	47	
4	HJK	23	8	6	9	38	46	−8	30	
5	Pallokissat	23	8	4	11	37	44	−7	28	
6	Kokkola Futis 10	23	7	2	14	30	55	−25	23	

== Relegation group ==
- Note: Matches and points of Preliminary stage are counted

Pos	Team	Pld	W	D	L	GF	GA	GD	Pts	Relegation
1	ONS	24	7	5	12	36	57	−21	26	
2	TPS	24	6	5	13	29	45	−16	23	
3	NiceFutis	24	6	4	14	23	52	−29	22	
4	GBK (R)	24	5	5	14	29	54	−25	20	Relegation to Naisten Ykkönen

(R) Relegated

== Top scorers ==
Pos.	Player	Club	Goals
1.	(Nigeria) Cynthia Uwak	Åland United	18
2.	(Finland) Vera Saastamoinen	HJK	17
3.	(United States) Monica Dolinsky	Åland United	15
4.	(Finland) Tiina Saario	Åland United	14
4.	(Finland) Sanna Ylianttila	ONS	14
6.	(Finland) Henni-Marika Malinen	FC Honka	13
6.	(Finland) Hanne Ojanperä	PK-35	13
8.	(Finland) Heidi Kivelä	PK-35	12
8.	(Finland) Juliette Kemppi	Åland United	12
10.	(Equatorial Guinea) Theresa Gomina	GBK	11
10.	(Finland) Jaana Lyytikäinen	Åland United	11
10.	(Finland) Marianna Tolvanen	FC Honka	11

== Sources ==
- 2013 Naisten Liiga Finnish Football Association
