= 2024 Kansallinen Liiga =

Finnish women's football league season

Kansallinen Liiga
- Season: 2024
- Dates: 12 April 2024 – TBD 2024
- Champions League: HJK
- Europa Cup: KuPS
- Matches: 92
- Goals: 304 (3.3 per match)
- Top goalscorer: (North Macedonia) Gentjana Rochi (14 goals)
- Biggest home win: Åland United 11–1 PKKU; 10 August 2024
- Biggest away win: PKKU 0–7 HJK; 15 June 2024
- Highest scoring: Åland United 11–1 PKKU; 10 August 2024
- Longest winning run: 10 matches HJK
- Longest unbeaten run: 18 matches HJK
- Longest winless run: 18 matches PKKU
- Longest losing run: 6 matches PKKU
- Highest attendance: 1,455; Ilves 3–1 FC Honka; 13 April 2024
- Lowest attendance: 52; PKKU 1–7 Ilves; 27 July 2024
- Attendance: 31,194 (339 per match)
- All statistics correct as of 15 September 2024.

The 2024 Kansallinen Liiga, also known as Subway Kansallinen Liiga for sponsorship reasons, is the 18th edition of the Finnish top-level women's football league.

KuPS are the defending champions, having won their third title, and third title in a row, in the 2023 season.

The schedule for the 2024 season has been announced on 24 January 2024. The first match was played on 12 April 2024 and the last matches of the regular season are scheduled for 31 August 2024. The championship round is scheduled to start on 14 September 2024 and the qualifying round one week later on 21 September 2024. The final matches should be played between 18 and 20 October 2024.

The 2024 season is a transition one as the Finnish women's league framework is being restructured. Beginning with the 2025 season, Kansallinen Liiga is shrinking to 8 teams from the current 10, and the Ykkönen, to be known as Kansallinen Ykkösen, is expanding from 8 teams to 10. As a consequence, three teams will be directly relegated from the Kansallinen Liiga to the Ykkönen in the 2024 season. There will be no relegation play-off.

== Teams ==
Locations of teams in the 2024 Kansallinen Liiga.

The participating team information is as per the official season guide.

Team	Home city	Home ground	Capacity	2023 finish
FC Honka	Espoo	Tapiolan urheilupuisto	4,100	4th
HJK	Helsinki	Bolt Arena	10,770	2nd
HPS	Helsinki	JYA Housing Areena	400	5th
Ilves	Tampere	Tammelan Stadion	8,017	7th
JyPK	Jyväskylä	Harjun stadion	5,000	1st (Ykkönen)
KuPS	Kuopio	Väre Areena	5,000	1st
PK-35	Helsinki	Algeco Areena	1,000	8th
PK-35 Vantaa	Vantaa	Myyrmäen jalkapallostadion	4,320	6th
PKKU	Kerava/Hyrylä	Kalevan UP/Hyrylä UP	2,500 (Note: figure for Kalevan UP.)	2nd (Ykkönen)
Åland United	Mariehamn	Wiklöf Holding Arena	1,635	3rd

=== Team changes ===
Entering league	Exiting league
Promoted from 2023 Ykkönen	Relegated to 2023 Ykkönen
JyPK; PKKU	ONS; TPS

== Regular season ==
=== League table ===
Pos	Team	Pld	W	D	L	GF	GA	GD	Pts	Qualification
1	HJK	18	17	1	0	55	10	+45	52	Advances to championship round
2	KuPS	18	12	4	2	50	20	+30	40	Advances to championship round
3	HPS	18	12	2	4	38	18	+20	38	Advances to championship round
4	Åland United	18	8	3	7	38	26	+12	27	Advances to championship round
5	PK-35 Vantaa	18	6	5	7	21	28	−7	23	Participates in the qualifying round
6	FC Honka	18	5	4	9	22	32	−10	19	Participates in the qualifying round
7	Ilves	18	5	3	10	26	30	−4	18	Participates in the qualifying round
8	PK-35	18	5	3	10	20	32	−12	18	Participates in the qualifying round
9	JyPK	18	5	2	11	11	27	−16	17	Participates in the qualifying round
10	PKKU	18	0	3	15	14	72	−58	3	Participates in the qualifying round

Source: KansallinenLiiga.fi
Rules for classification: 1) Points; 2) Goal difference; 3) Number of goals scored; 4) Head-to-head points; 5) Head-to-head goal difference; 6) Head-to-head away goals scored;

=== Results ===
Home \ Away	ÅLA	HJK	HON	HPS	ILV	JYV	KES	KUO	P35	VAN
Åland United		3–6	3–3	0–1	1–3	0–1	11–1	0–2	1–0	2–2
HJK	2–0		2–2	2–0	1–0	4–0	2–0	3–0	4–2	3–0
FC Honka	0–4	0–1		0–3	2–1	1–0	1–1	2–2	0–1	3–2
HPS	0–3	0–2	1–0		1–0	0–1	7–2	2–2	3–2	3–0
Ilves	0–1	1–2	3–1	0–2		0–0	4–0	2–3	1–3	0–4
JyPK	0–2	0–3	1–2	0–3	0–0		2–1	1–4	0–1	0–1
PKKU	1–3	0–7	1–3	1–3	1–7	2–3		0–6	2–2	0–4
KuPS	3–2	0–1	3–1	1–1	8–0	2–1	5–1		1–1	3–0
PK-35	0–1	1–4	2–1	1–5	0–4	0–1	2–0	1–2		0–0
PK-35 Vantaa	1–1	1–6	1–0	1–3	0–0	1–0	0–0	1–3	2–1	

Source: KansallinenLiiga.fi
Legend: Blue = home team win; Yellow = draw; Red = away team win.

== Championship round ==
=== League table ===
Pos	Team	Pld	W	D	L	GF	GA	GD	Pts	Qualification
1	HJK	24	20	2	2	66	15	+51	62	Qualification for Champions League first qualifying round
2	KuPS	24	14	7	3	59	26	+33	49	Qualification for Europa Cup first qualifying round
3	HPS	24	14	2	8	43	28	+15	44	
4	Åland United	24	10	5	9	46	37	+9	35	

Source: KansallinenLiiga.fi
Rules for classification: 1) Points; 2) Goal difference; 3) Number of goals scored; 4) Head-to-head points; 5) Head-to-head goal difference; 6) Head-to-head away goals scored;

=== Results ===
Home \ Away	HJK	KUO	HPS	ÅLA
HJK		2–1	4–0	3–0
KuPS	0–0		2–0	3–3
HPS	2–0	0–2		0–1
Åland United	2–1	1–1	1–3	

Updated to match(es) played on 5 January 2025. Source: KansallinenLiiga.fi
Legend: Blue = home team win; Yellow = draw; Red = away team win.

== Qualifying round ==
=== League table ===
Pos	Team	Pld	W	D	L	GF	GA	GD	Pts	Relegation
1	PK-35 Vantaa	18	6	5	7	21	28	−7	23	
2	FC Honka	18	5	4	9	22	32	−10	19	
3	Ilves	18	5	3	10	26	30	−4	18	
4	PK-35	18	5	3	10	20	32	−12	18	Relegation to 2025 Ykkönen
5	JyPK	18	5	2	11	11	27	−16	17	Relegation to 2025 Ykkönen
6	PKKU	18	0	3	15	14	72	−58	3	Relegation to 2025 Ykkönen

First match(es) will be played: September 2024. Source: KansallinenLiiga.fi
Rules for classification: 1) Points; 2) Goal difference; 3) Number of goals scored; 4) Head-to-head points; 5) Head-to-head goal difference; 6) Head-to-head away goals scored;

=== Results ===
Home \ Away	VAN	HON	ILV	P35	JYV	KES
PK-35 Vantaa						
FC Honka						
Ilves						
PK-35						
JyPK						
PKKU						

First match(es) will be played: September 2024. Source: KansallinenLiiga.fi
Legend: Blue = home team win; Yellow = draw; Red = away team win.

== Statistics ==
=== Top goalscorers ===
As of 15 September 2024

Rank	Player	Team	Apps.	Goals
1	(North Macedonia) Gentjana Rochi	KuPS	17	14
2	(Finland) Lotta Kalske	HJK	19	12
2	(Finland) Ria Karjalainen	HPS	19	12
2	(Finland) Anna Olmala	Ilves	18	12
5	(Finland) Lilli Halttunen	HJK	18	11
6	(Finland) Ilona Walta	FC Honka	18	10
7	(Finland) Aino Kröger	KuPS	16	9
8	(Finland) Anni Hakasalo	Åland United	19	8
8	(Finland) Aada Törrönen	Åland United	18	8
10	(Albania) Lavdie Begolli	KuPS	16	7
10	(Finland) Sara Sievistö	HJK	18	7
10	(Finland) Jenna Topra	HJK	17	7
