= Tinja-Riikka Korpela =

Finnish footballer (born 1986)

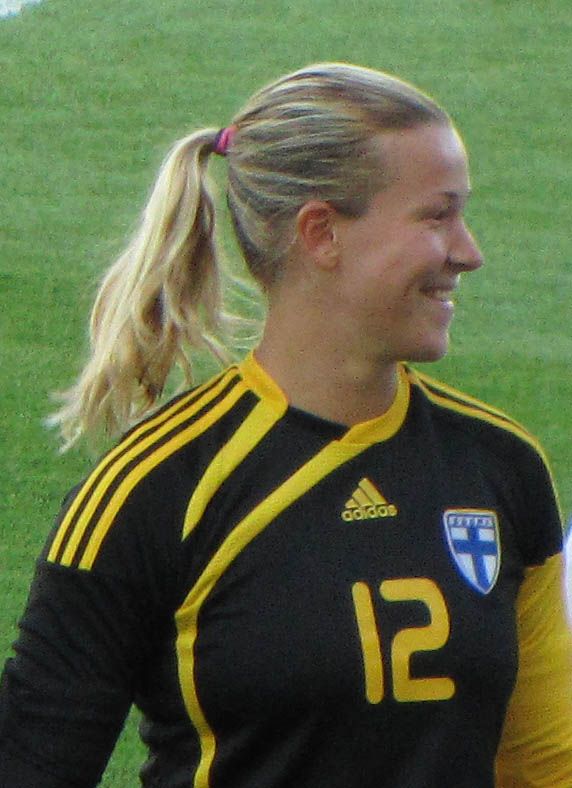
- Korpela in 2009

Personal information
- Full name: Tinja-Riikka Tellervo Korpela
- Date of birth: 5 May 1986 (age 40)
- Place of birth: Oulu, Finland
- Height: 1.75 m (5 ft 9 in)
- Position: Goalkeeper

Team information
- Current team: Servette

Youth career
- 1992–2004: OLS Oulu
- 2004–2005: SC Raisio

Senior career*
Years	Team	Apps	(Gls)
2001–2004	OLS Oulu	48	(0)
2005	Sporting Club Raisio	18	(0)
2006–2009	Honka	78	(0)
2010–2011	Kolbotn	43	(0)
2012–2013	LSK Kvinner	40	(0)
2014	Tyresö FF	4	(0)
2014–2017	Bayern Munich	51	(0)
2018–2019	Vålerenga	17	(0)
2019–2021	Everton	16	(0)
2021–2023	Tottenham Hotspur	22	(0)
2023–2024	AS Roma	7	(0)
2024–	Servette	9	(0)

International career^{‡}
2007–2025	Finland	128	(0)
- * Club domestic league appearances and goals as of 20 January 2025 ‡ National team caps and goals as of 25 June 2025

Tinja-Riikka Tellervo Korpela (born 5 May 1986) is a Finnish professional footballer who plays as a goalkeeper for Swiss Women's Super League club Servette. She previously played for AS Roma in Serie A, Tottenham Hotspur in the FA WSL, Bayern Munich in the German Frauen-Bundesliga, Tyresö FF in Sweden's Damallsvenskan, LSK Kvinner and Kolbotn of Norway's Toppserien, and FC Honka of Finland's Naisten Liiga.

Korpela debuted for Finland's national team in 2007. She represented her country at the UEFA Women's Championships in 2009, 2013 and 2022.

== Club career ==
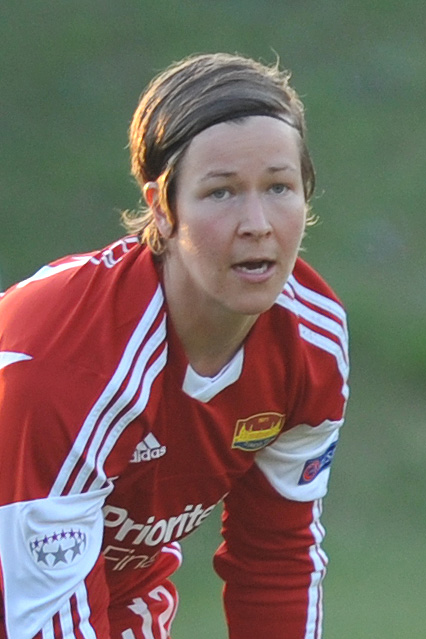
Playing for Tyresö in 2014

Swedish UEFA Women's Champions League contenders Tyresö FF signed Korpela to a contract in December 2013. Korpela competed with Carola Söberg for a starting place and was a substitute in Tyresö's 4–3 defeat by Wolfsburg in the 2014 UEFA Women's Champions League Final. Tyresö suffered a financial implosion in 2014 and withdrew from the 2014 Damallsvenskan season, expunging all their results and making all their players free agents.

Korpela signed a two-year contract with German Frauen-Bundesliga club FC Bayern Munich in June 2014. On 18 February 2016, she extended her contract until 2018. At their request and in agreement of the association their contract was dissolved at the end of 2017; She left FC Bayern Munich after just three and a half years. It was duly approved before the last round game on 17 December 2017 before the home game against 1. FFC Frankfurt.

On 6 July 2021, Korpela signed for Tottenham after leaving Everton in the WSL.

== International career ==
Korpela was part of the Finland squad at the 2006 FIFA U-20 Women's World Championship. She made her senior Finland women's national football team debut in March 2007, against Sweden at the Algarve Cup. By the time of UEFA Women's Euro 2009, hosted in Finland, Korpela was the first choice goalkeeper.

In June 2013, Korpela was named in national coach Andrée Jeglertz's Finland squad for UEFA Women's Euro 2013. After playing in Finland's first two matches at the tournament, she was replaced with longstanding rival Minna Meriluoto for the final group game; a 1–1 draw with Denmark.

On 21 October 2021, she played her 100th match for Finland in a 3–0 win over Georgia in the 2023 FIFA Women's World Cup qualification.

On 19 June 2025, Korpela was called up to the Finland squad for the UEFA Women's Euro 2025. She announced her retirement from international duties after the tournament.

== Personal life ==
Korpela is openly gay.

== Career statistics ==
As of 21 January 2025

Appearances and goals by club, season and competition
Club	Season	League			Cup		League cup		Europe		Other		Total	
Club	Season	Division	Apps	Goals	Apps	Goals	Apps	Goals	Apps	Goals	Apps	Goals	Apps	Goals
OLS Oulu	2004	Naisten Ykkönen					–		–		–			
SC Raisio	2005	Naisten SM-sarja	18	0	–		–		–		–		18	0
Honka	2006	Naisten SM-sarja			–		–		–		–			
Honka	2007	Naisten Liiga			–		–		–		–			
Honka	2008	Naisten Liiga			–		–		–		–			
Honka	2009	Naisten Liiga	19	0	–		–		2 (Note: Appearances in UEFA Women's Champions League)	0	–		21	0
Honka	Total		78	0	0	0	0	0	2	0	0	0	80	0
Kolbotn	2010	Toppserien	21	0	–		–		–		–		21	0
Kolbotn	2011	Toppserien	22	0	–		–		–		–		22	0
Kolbotn	Total		43	0	0	0	0	0	0	0	0	0	43	0
LSK Kvinner	2012	Toppserien	22	0	–		–		–		–		22	0
LSK Kvinner	2013	Toppserien	18	0	–		–		–		–		18	0
LSK Kvinner	Total		40	0	0	0	0	0	0	0	0	0	40	0
Tyresö	2014	Damallsvenskan	4	0	0	0	–		2	0	–		6	0
Bayern Munich	2014–15	Frauen-Bundesliga	19	0	2	0	–		–		–		21	0
Bayern Munich	2015–16	Frauen-Bundesliga	18	0	4	0	–		2	0	–		24	0
Bayern Munich	2016–17	Frauen-Bundesliga	12	0	2	0	–		5	0	–		19	0
Bayern Munich	2017–18	Frauen-Bundesliga	2	0	2	0	–		0	0	–		4	0
Bayern Munich	Total		51	0	10	0	0	0	7	0	0	0	68	0
Vålerenga	2018	Toppserien	10	0	–		–		–		–		10	0
Vålerenga	2019	Toppserien	7	0	–		–		–		–		7	0
Vålerenga	Total		17	0	0	0	0	0	0	0	0	0	17	0
Everton	2019–20	FA Women's Super League	11	0	0	0	1	0	–		–		12	0
Everton	2020–21	FA Women's Super League	5	0	0	0	2	0	–		–		7	0
Everton	Total		16	0	0	0	3	0	0	0	0	0	19	0
Tottenham Hotspur	2021–22	FA Women's Super League	11	0	0	0	3	0	–		–		14	0
Tottenham Hotspur	2022–23	Women's Super League	11	0	2	0	3	0	–		–		16	0
Tottenham Hotspur	Total		22	0	2	0	6	0	0	0	0	0	30	0
AS Roma	2023–24	Serie A Femminile	7	0	0	0	–		1	0	0	0	8	0
Servette	2024–25	Swiss Women's Super League	9	0	0	0	–		1	0	–		10	0
Career total			353	0	12	0	9	0	13	0	0	0	387	0

== Honours ==
FC Honka

- Naisten Liiga: 2006, 2007, 2008

Bayern München

- Bundesliga: 2014–15, 2015–16
