= Nora Heroum =

Finnish footballer (born 1994)

Personal information
- Date of birth: 20 July 1994 (age 32)
- Place of birth: Helsinki, Finland
- Height: 1.73 m (5 ft 8 in)
- Positions: Defender; midfielder

Team information
- Current team: HJK Helsinki

Youth career
- –2009: Viikingit

Senior career*
Years	Team	Apps	(Gls)
2010–2012	HJK	57	(8)
2013	Honka	22	(3)
2014	Åland United	23	(4)
2015–2017	Fortuna Hjørring		
2017–2018	Brescia	21	(3)
2018–2020	Milan	35	(2)
2020–2021	Brighton & Hove Albion	11	(0)
2021–2022	Lazio	22	(0)
2022–2023	Parma	25	(1)
2023–2025	Sampdoria	48	(1)

International career^{‡}
2012–	Finland	93	(2)
- * Club domestic league appearances and goals as of 26 June 2025 ‡ National team caps and goals as of 26 June 2025

Nora Heroum (born 20 July 1994) is a Finnish professional footballer who plays as a defender or midfielder for Finnish Kansallinen Liiga club HJK Helsinki and the Finland national team.

She previously played for HJK Helsinki, FC Honka and Åland United of the Finnish Naisten Liiga, Danish club Fortuna Hjørring, English club Brighton & Hove Albion and Italian Serie A clubs Brescia, AC Milan, Lazio, Parma and Sampdoria

== Early life ==
Heroum was born on 20 July 1994 in Helsinki, Finland to a Moroccan father and a Finnish mother. She has four siblings and her brother Samir is also a footballer.

== Club career ==
=== Fortuna Hjørring ===
On 6 January 2015, Heroum was announced at Fortuna Hjørring. During her time at Fortuna Hjørring, the club reached the UEFA Women's Champions League quarterfinals.

=== Brescia ===
Heroum scored on her league debut against Pink Sport Bari on 30 September 2017, scoring in the 11th minute.

=== Milan ===
On 19 July 2018, Heroum was announced at Milan. She made her league debut against Pink Sport Bari on 22 September 2018. Heroum scored her first league goal against Roma on 15 September 2019, scoring in the 69th minute.

=== Brighton & Hove Albion ===
On 15 July 2020, Heroum was announced at Brighton. She made her league debut against Manchester City on 13 September 2020. Brighton & Hove Albion released Heroum at the end of the 2020–21 Women's Super League season in May 2021.

=== Lazio ===
Heroum made her league debut against Sampdoria on 29 August 2021.

=== Parma ===
Heroum made her league debut against Inter Milan on 28 August 2022. She scored her first league goal against Sassuolo on 6 May 2023, scoring in the 1st minute.

=== Sampdoria ===
Heroum made her league debut against Inter Milan on 17 September 2023. She scored her first league goal against Lazio on 15 September 2024, scoring in the 72nd minute.

== International career ==
Heroum played her first international for Finland women's national team on 27 May 2012 against Belgium. She was a member of the Finnish squad at the UEFA Women's Euro 2013. Aged 18, she was one of the youngest players at the competition and had to withdraw from the 2013 UEFA Women's U-19 Championship in order to participate.

Heroum was called up to the 2020 Cyprus Women's Cup.

Heroum was called up to the Finland squad for the UEFA Women's Euro 2022. After Finland failed to qualify in 2017, Heroum was considered an important member of the national team which competed at UEFA Women's Euro 2022 in England.

Heroum was part of the Finland squad that won the 2023 Cyprus Women's Cup for the first time.

On 19 June 2025, Heroum was called up to the Finland squad for the UEFA Women's Euro 2025.

== Playing style ==
Originally an attacking midfielder who modelled her game on Pavel Nedvěd, Heroum was retrained as a full-back by her coach at Milan, Carolina Morace.

== Career statistics ==
=== Club ===
As of 2 July 2025

Appearances and goals by club, season and competition
Club	Season	League			National cup (Note: Includes Finnish Women's Cup, Women's FA Cup and Coppa Italia Women)		League cup (Note: Includes Naisten Liigacup and FA Women's League Cup)		Europe		Total	
Club	Season	Division	Apps	Goals	Apps	Goals	Apps	Goals	Apps	Goals	Apps	Goals
Klubi 09	2011	Naisten Ykkönen	4	2	–		–		–		4	2
HJK Helsinki	2011	Naisten Liiga	19	5	2	0	–		–		21	5
HJK Helsinki	2012	Naisten Liiga	26	2	1	0	5	4	–		32	6
HJK Helsinki	Total		45	7	3	0	5	4	0	0	53	11
Honka	2013	Naisten Liiga	22	3	3	2	–		–		25	5
Åland United	2014	Naisten Liiga	23	4	1	0	–		–		24	4
Fortuna Hjørring	2015–16	Danish Women's League					–		4 (Note: Appearances in UEFA Women's Champions League)	0	4	0
Fortuna Hjørring	2016–17	Danish Women's League					–		6	0	6	0
Fortuna Hjørring	Total		–	–	–	–	–	–	10	0	10	0
Brescia	2017–18	Serie A Femminile	17	1	0	0	–		4	0	21	1
AC Milan	2018–19	Serie A Femminile	20	0	0	0	–		–		20	0
AC Milan	2019–20	Serie A Femminile	15	2	0	0	–		–		15	2
AC Milan	Total		35	2	0	0	0	0	0	0	35	2
Brighton & Hove Albion	2020–21	Women's Super League	11	0	2	1	2	0	–		15	1
Lazio	2021–22	Serie A Femminile	22	0	0	0	–		–		22	0
Parma	2022–23	Serie A Femminile	25	1	0	0	–		–		25	1
Sampdoria	2023–24	Serie A Femminile	22	0	1	0	–		–		23	0
Sampdoria	2024–25	Serie A Femminile	26	1	1	0	–		–		27	1
Sampdoria	Total		48	1	2	0	0	0	0	0	50	1
Career total			252	21	11	3	7	4	14	0	284	28

=== International ===
As of 2 July 2025

Appearances and goals by national team and year
National team	Year	Apps	Goals
Finland	2012	5	0
Finland	2013	13	0
Finland	2014	12	0
Finland	2015	9	0
Finland	2016	8	1
Finland	2017	7	0
Finland	2018	9	0
Finland	2019	9	0
Finland	2020	3	0
Finland	2021	5	0
Finland	2022	5	0
Finland	2023	6	1
Finland	2024	1	0
Finland	2025	1	0
Total		93	2

=== International goals ===
Scores and results list Finland's goal tally first, score column indicates score after each Heroum goal.

List of international goals scored by Nora Heroum
No.	Date	Venue	Opponent	Score	Result	Competition
1.	12 April 2016	Stadion Mitar Mićo Goliš, Petrovac, Montenegro	Montenegro	7–1	7–1	UEFA Women's Euro 2017 qualifying
2.	22 February 2023	AEK Arena, Larnaca, Cyprus	Romania	3–0	4–0	2023 Cyprus Women's Cup
