= Biodun =

Biodun is a Nigerian given name. Notable people with the name include:

- Biodun Fatoyinbo (born 1976), Nigerian pastor
- Biodun Jeyifo (1946–2026), Nigerian author and academic
- Biodun Obende (born 1987), Nigerian footballer
- Biodun Ogunbiyi, Nigerian politician
- Biodun Oyebanji (born 1967), Nigerian politician
- Biodun Shobanjo, Nigerian businessman
- Biodun Stephen, Nigerian film director
