= Maiju Ruotsalainen =

Finnish footballer and coach (born 1983)

Personal information
- Full name: Maiju Ruotsalainen
- Date of birth: 25 November 1983 (age 42)
- Place of birth: Tampere, Finland
- Height: 1.77 m (5 ft 9 1/2 in)
- Positions: Midfielder; forward

Youth career
- Ilves

Senior career*
Years	Team	Apps	(Gls)
- Ilves
- MPS
- HJK
2004–2005	Honka		
2006–2007	Vejle Boldklub		
2007–2008	Honka		
2009–2013	Åland United		
2010	→ Torres (loan)	10	(0)

International career
2012	Finland	1	(0)

Managerial career
- Ilves
- Åland United
- 2017–2019: Finland women (assistant)
- 2019–2020: Umeå IK (youth)
- 2021–2022: AIK
- * Club domestic league appearances and goals

Maiju Ruotsalainen (born 25 November 1983) is a Finnish footballer and coach who played for the Finland women's national football team. At club level she most recently represented Åland United of the Naistenliiga. She formerly played for FC Honka and Italy's Torres CF, and she has also played in the UEFA Women's Champions League with all three teams.

== Club career ==
Ruotsalainen began playing in her native Tampere with Ilves, then spent time in Helsinki with MPS and HJK. She spent four seasons with FC Honka, of Espoo, intersected by a spell in Denmark with Vejle.

Ahead of the 2013 season, Ruotsalainen travelled to England for a trial with English FA WSL giants Doncaster Rovers Belles. Although the Belles wanted to sign her, she ultimately decided to rejoin Åland United. Heel and hip injuries caused Ruotsalainen to miss most of the 2013 season.

In October 2013 Ruotsalainen left Åland United after five years and returned to her first club Ilves, where she took up a youth coaching role.

== International career ==
Ruotsalainen was named in the Finland squad for the 2012 Cyprus Cup. At the tournament she featured as a late substitute in Finland's opening match, a 3–1 defeat by England at GSP Stadium.
