= Emma Koivisto =

Finnish footballer (born 1994)

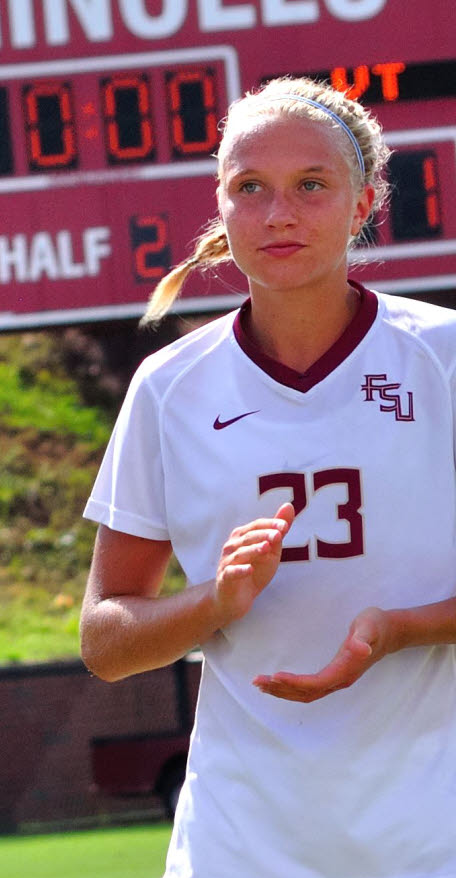
- Koivisto playing for Florida State Seminoles in 2014

Personal information
- Full name: Emma Wilhelmina Koivisto
- Date of birth: 25 September 1994 (age 32)
- Place of birth: Helsinki, Finland
- Height: 5 ft 6 in (1.68 m)
- Positions: Defender; midfielder

Team information
- Current team: AC Milan
- Number: 2

Youth career
- 2000–2006: SAPA
- 2006–2010: HJK

College career
Years	Team	Apps	(Gls)
2014–2017	Florida State Seminoles	79	(2)

Senior career*
Years	Team	Apps	(Gls)
2010–2012	HJK	58	(7)
2013–2017	Honka	53	(4)
2018–2020	Häcken	61	(6)
2021–2022	Brighton & Hove Albion	31	(3)
2022–2024	Liverpool	40	(4)
2024–	AC Milan	25	(2)

International career^{‡}
2010–2011	Finland U17	6	(0)
2011–2013	Finland U19	10	(4)
2014	Finland U20	3	(0)
2012–	Finland	123	(10)
- * Club domestic league appearances and goals as of 26 June 2025 ‡ National team caps and goals as of 15 October 2026

Emma Wilhelmina Koivisto (Finnish: ['emːɑ 'koiʋisto] born 25 September 1994) is a Finnish professional footballer who plays as a midfielder for Serie A Femminile club AC Milan and the Finland national team.

== College career ==
Koivisto attended Florida State University, playing for the Florida State Seminoles; she played an average of 20 games per season, scoring 2 goals in her time at college.

== Club career ==
She previously played for HJK and FC Honka of the Naisten Liiga, as well as Kopparbergs/Göteborg FC, with whom she won the 2020 Damallsvenskan.

She signed for Liverpool in July 2022 after spending 18 months with Brighton & Hove Albion, taking the number 2 shirt.

On 26 June 2024, Koivisto signed a three-year deal with AC Milan. The transfer was effective 1 July 2024. She scored her first goal for Milan on 25 January 2025, in a 3–2 home win against AS Roma.

== International career ==
She is a Finland women's national football team international, and was included in their squad for UEFA Women's Euro 2022.

On 17 July 2024, Koivisto recorded her 100th cap for Finland in a 4–0 defeat to Italy.

On 19 June 2025, Koivisto was called up to the Finland squad for the UEFA Women's Euro 2025.

== Career statistics ==
=== Club ===
As of 26 June 2025

Appearances and goals by club, season and competition
Club	Season	League			National Cup (Note: Includes the Finnish Women's Cup, Svenska Cupen, Women's FA Cup)		League Cup (Note: Includes the WSL Cup/Women's League Cup)		Europe (Note: Includes the UEFA Women's Champions League)		Total	
Club	Season	Division	Apps	Goals	Apps	Goals	Apps	Goals	Apps	Goals	Apps	Goals
HJK	2010	Naisten Liiga	14	2	0	0	—		—		14	2
HJK	2011	Naisten Liiga	17	3	2	0	—		—		19	3
HJK	2012	Naisten Liiga	27	2	1	0	—		—		28	2
HJK	Total		58	7	3	0	—		—		61	7
Honka	2013	Naisten Liiga	11	1	2	0	—		—		13	1
Honka	2014	Naisten Liiga	14	0	3	0	—		—		17	0
Honka	2015	Naisten Liiga	11	1	2	0	—		—		13	1
Honka	2016	Naisten Liiga	7	1	1	0	—		—		8	1
Honka	2017	Naisten Liiga	10	1	0	0	—		—		10	1
Honka	Total		53	4	8	0	—		—		61	4
BK Häcken	2018	Damallsvenskan	21	0	3	0	—		—		24	0
BK Häcken	2019	Damallsvenskan	20	2	6	3	—		2	0	28	5
BK Häcken	2020	Damallsvenskan	20	4	1	1	—		2	0	23	5
BK Häcken	Total		61	6	10	4	—		4	0	75	10
Brighton & Hove Albion	2020–21	Women's Super League	9	0	3	0	0	0	—		12	0
Brighton & Hove Albion	2021–22	Women's Super League	22	3	1	1	3	0	—		26	4
Brighton & Hove Albion	Total		31	3	4	1	3	0	—		38	4
Liverpool	2022–23	Women's Super League	21	2	1	0	5	0	—		27	2
Liverpool	2023–24	Women's Super League	19	2	3	0	2	0	—		24	2
Liverpool	Total		40	4	4	0	7	0	—		51	4
AC Milan	2024–25	Serie A	25	2	0	0	–		–		25	2
Career total			268	26	29	5	10	0	4	0	311	31

=== International ===
As of match played 13 October 2026

National team	Year	Apps	Goals
Finland	2012	5	0
Finland	2013	3	0
Finland	2014	3	0
Finland	2015	7	1
Finland	2016	4	0
Finland	2017	8	0
Finland	2018	11	0
Finland	2019	13	1
Finland	2020	5	0
Finland	2021	9	1
Finland	2022	13	0
Finland	2023	11	1
Finland	2024	13	2
Finland	2025	9	1
Finland	2026	9	2
Total		123	10

Scores and results list Finland's goal tally first, score column indicates score after each Koivisto goal.

List of international goals scored by Emma Koivisto
No.	Date	Venue	Opponent	Score	Result	Competition
1	21 September 2015	Tallaght Stadium, Dublin, Ireland	Republic of Ireland	1–0	2–0	UEFA Women's Euro 2017 qualifying
2	7 November 2019	Telia 5G -areena, Helsinki, Finland	Cyprus	4–0	4–0	UEFA Women's Euro 2022 qualifying
3	23 February 2021	AEK Arena – Georgios Karapatakis, Larnaca, Cyprus	Cyprus	1–0	5–0	UEFA Women's Euro 2022 qualifying
4	30 November 2023	Veritas Stadion, Turku, Finland	Romania	4–0	6–0	2023–24 UEFA Women's Nations League
5	12 July 2024	Veritas Stadion, Turku, Finland	Norway	1–1	1–1	UEFA Women's Euro 2025 qualifying
6	29 October 2024	Tammelan Stadion, Tampere, Finland	Montenegro	3–0	5–0	UEFA Women's Euro 2025 qualifying play-offs
7	8 April 2025	Tammelan Stadion, Tampere, Finland	Hungary	1–0	3–0	2025 UEFA Women's Nations League
8	27 November 2025	Estadio Antonio Gallardo, Arcos de la Frontera, Spain	Austria	1–0	1–1	Friendly
9	9 October 2026	Tammelan Stadion, Tampere, Finland	Serbia	1–0	3–1	2027 FIFA Women's World Cup qualification play-offs
10	13 October 2026	Serbian FA Sports Center, Stara Pazova, Serbia	Serbia	1–0	3–1	2027 FIFA Women's World Cup qualification play-offs

== Honours ==
Kopparbergs/Göteborg FC

- Damallsvenskan: 2020, Runner-Up: 2018, 2019
- Svenska Cupen: 2018-19

FC Honka

- Naisten Liiga: 2017
- Finnish Women's Cup: 2014, 2015, Runner-Up: 2016

HJK

- Finnish Women's Cup: 2010
- Kansallinen Cup: 2011, 2012

Finland Women's National Team

- Cyprus Women's Cup: 2023, Runner-Up: 2020
- Pinatar Cup: 2024
