= Sanni Franssi =

Finnish footballer (born 1995)

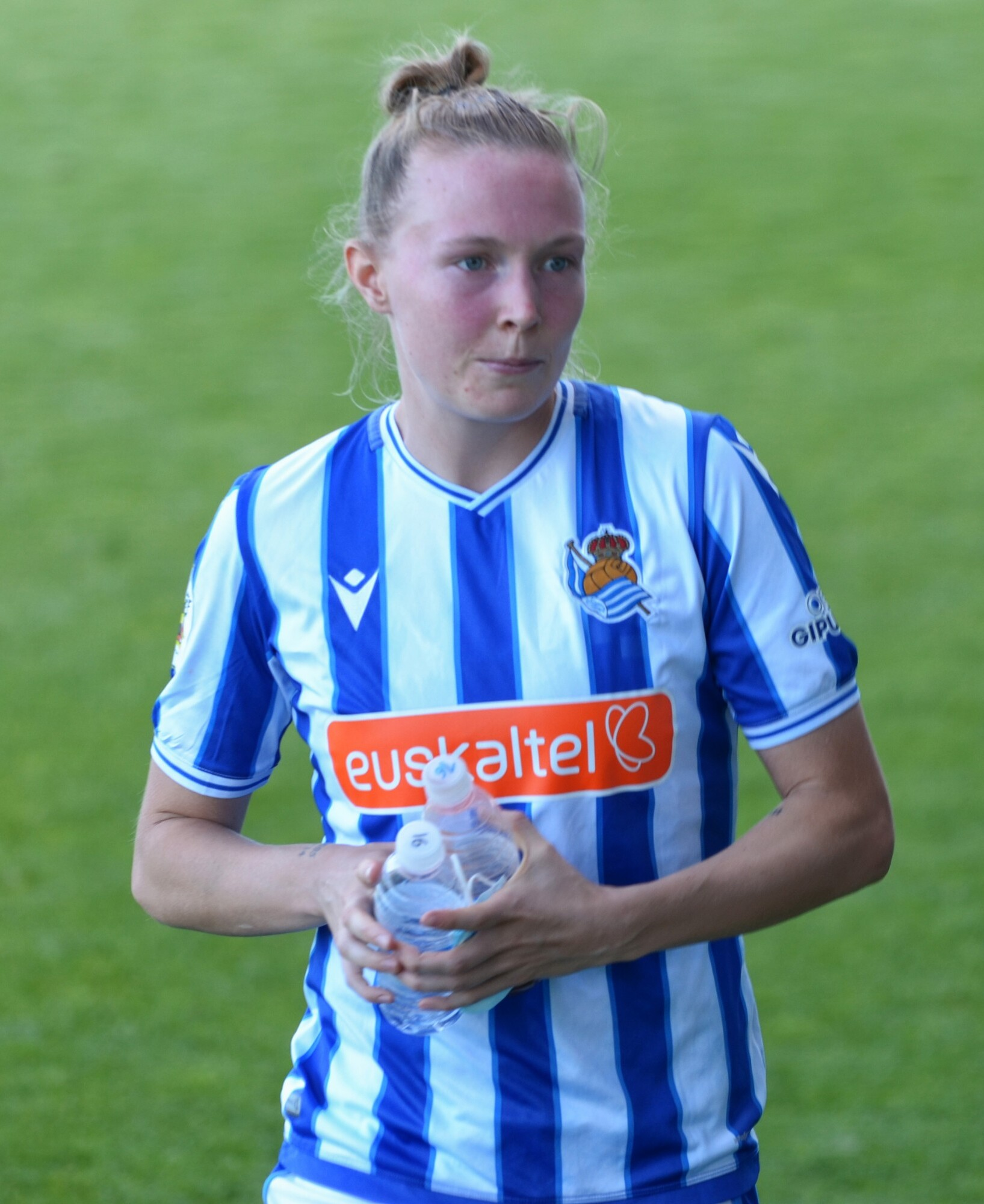
- Franssi with Real Sociedad in 2021

Personal information
- Full name: Sanni Maija Franssi
- Date of birth: 19 March 1995 (age 31)
- Place of birth: Riihimäki, Finland
- Height: 1.74 m (5 ft 9 in)
- Position: Forward

Team information
- Current team: Sunderland (on loan from London City Lionesses)
- Number: 16

Senior career*
Years	Team	Apps	(Gls)
2011–2014	VJS	44	(32)
2012–2017	PK-35	90	(54)
2016–2017	→ FC Zürich (loan)	17	(16)
2017–2018	Juventus	21	(10)
2018–2020	Fortuna Hjørring	41	(20)
2020–2025	Real Sociedad	146	(36)
2025–	London City Lionesses	18	(0)
2026–	→ Sunderland (loan)	8	(3)

International career^{‡}
2015–	Finland	103	(8)
- * Club domestic league appearances and goals as of 15 November 2026 ‡ National team caps and goals as of 15 October 2026

Sanni Maija Franssi (Finnish: [ˈsɑnːi ˈmɑijɑ ˈfrɑnsːi]; born 19 March 1995) is a Finnish professional footballer who plays as a forward for Women's Super League 2 club Sunderland, on loan from London City Lionesses, and the Finland national team.

== Club career ==
Franssi has played in the youth sectors of Riihimäen Palloseura, Hyvinkään Palloseura, Koivukylan Palloseura and Vantaan Jalkapalloseura.

Franssi made her league debut for PK-35 against Åland United on 15 April 2012. She scored her first league goal against GBK on 23 March 2016, scoring in the 9th minute. In 2016 Franssi was named Naisten Liiga Player of the Season after hitting 20 league goals for her club, PK-35.

Franssi spent the 2016–17 season with FC Zürich Frauen, scoring 16 goals and finishing as runner-up to FC Neunkirch in both the Nationalliga A and Swiss Women's Cup.

Franssi returned to PK-35 in July 2017. She made her league debut against JyPK on 8 July 2017. Franssi scored her first league goal against TPS on 15 July 2017, scoring in the 32nd minute.

Franssi signed for newly founded Serie A club Juventus in September 2017. She made her league debut against Atalanta on 30 September 2017. Franssi scored her first league goal against Empoli on 28 October 2017, scoring in the 10th minute.

Franssi made her league debut against Odense Boldklub Q on 8 September 2018. She scored her first league goal against B 93 on 16 September 2018, scoring in the 67th minute. On 27 April 2019, Franssi extended her contract by one year.

On 17 July 2020, Franssi was announced at Real Sociedad. She made her league debut against Deportivo de La Coruña on 11 October 2020. Franssi scored her first league goal against Dux Logroño on 11 November 2020, scoring in the 70th and 79th minute.

In December 2021 Franssi was playing for Real Sociedad of Spain's Primera División but was reported to be attracting transfer interest from multiple clubs in England's FA Women's Super League. On 6 April 2022, Franssi's contract was extended for two years.

On 4 July 2025, newly promoted Women's Super League club London City Lionesses announced the signing of Franssi.

On 24 July 2026, After featuring 23 times across all competitions the prior season, London City confirmed that Franssi was joining Sunderland in the Women's Super League 2, on a season-long loan.

== International career ==
Franssi played her first senior international for Finland women's national team in February 2015 against Sweden. She had already represented her country at the 2014 FIFA U-20 Women's World Cup.

She scored her first senior international goal in a 3–2 UEFA Women's Euro 2017 qualifying defeat by Portugal on 16 September 2016.

Franssi was called up to the 2018 Cyprus Women's Cup. She was also called up to the 2019 Cyprus Women's Cup.

Franssi was called up to the 2020 Cyprus Women's Cup.

Franssi was called up to the Finland squad for the UEFA Women's Euro 2022.

Franssi was part of the Finland squad that won the 2023 Cyprus Women's Cup for the first time.

On 19 June 2025, Franssi was called up to the Finland squad for the UEFA Women's Euro 2025.

== Personal life ==
Franssi's younger brother is ice hockey player Santeri Hatakka.

== Career statistics ==
As of match played 15 November 2026

Appearances and goals by club, season and competition
Club	Season	League			National cup (Note: Includes Finnish Women's Cup, Swiss Women's Cup, Danish Women's Cup and Copa de la Reina de Fútbol)		League Cup (Note: Includes Women's League Cup)		Europe		Other		Total	
Club	Season	Division	Apps	Goals	Apps	Goals	Apps	Goals	Apps	Goals	Apps	Goals	Apps	Goals
VJS	2011	Naisten Kakkonen	7	0	–		–		–		–		7	0
VJS	2012	Naisten Ykkönen	18	17	–		–		–		–		18	17
VJS	2013	Naisten Ykkönen	18	14	1	1	–		–		–		19	15
VJS	2014	Naisten Ykkönen	1	1	–		–		–		–		1	1
VJS	Total		44	32	1	1	–		0	0	0	0	45	33
PK-35 Vantaa	2012	Naisten Liiga	5	0	–		–		–		2 (Note: Appearances in Naisten Liigacup)	1	7	1
PK-35 Vantaa	2013	Naisten Liiga	20	3	–		–		5 (Note: Appearances in UEFA Women's Champions League)	1	–		25	4
PK-35 Vantaa	2014	Naisten Liiga	23	19	2	1	–		5	3	–		30	23
PK-35 Vantaa	2015	Naisten Liiga	23	9	4	2	–		–		–		27	11
PK-35 Vantaa	2016	Naisten Liiga	15	20	4	2	–		–		–		19	22
PK-35 Vantaa	2017	Naisten Liiga	4	3	2	3	–		3	1	–		9	7
PK-35 Vantaa	Total		90	54	12	8	–		13	5	2	1	117	68
Zürich (loan)	2016–17	Swiss Women's Super League	17	16	4	0	–		7	2	–		28	18
Juventus	2017–18	Serie A Femminile	21	10	0	0	–		–		–		21	10
Fortuna Hjørring	2018–19	Danish Women's League	22	10	5	4	–		2	0	–		29	14
Fortuna Hjørring	2019–20	Danish Women's League	19	10	2	0	–		4	0	–		25	10
Fortuna Hjørring	Total		41	20	7	4	–		6	0	0	0	54	24
Real Sociedad	2020–21	Primera División	31	11	1	0	–		–		–		32	11
Real Sociedad	2021–22	Primera División	30	10	2	0	–		–		–		32	10
Real Sociedad	2022–23	Liga F	28	4	1	0	–		2	0	2 (Note: Appearances in Supercopa de España Femenina)	0	33	4
Real Sociedad	2023–24	Liga F	29	7	5	3	–		–		–		34	10
Real Sociedad	2024–25	Liga F	28	4	2	0	–		–		1	0	31	4
Real Sociedad	Total		146	36	11	3	–		2	0	3	0	162	39
London City Lionesses	2025–26	Women's Super League	18	0	2	0	3	2	–		–		23	2
Sunderland (loan)	2026–27	Women's Super League 2	8	3	0	0	4	0	–		–		12	3
Career total			385	171	37	16	7	2	28	7	5	1	462	197

=== International ===
As of 2 July 2025

Appearances and goals by national team and year
National team	Year	Apps	Goals
Finland	2015	3	0
Finland	2016	4	1
Finland	2017	8	0
Finland	2018	12	0
Finland	2019	11	1
Finland	2020	5	0
Finland	2021	9	1
Finland	2022	11	0
Finland	2023	11	2
Finland	2024	10	0
Finland	2025	8	2
Total		92	7

Scores and results list Finland's goal tally first, score column indicates score after each Franssi goal.

List of international goals scored by Sanni Franssi
No.	Date	Venue	Opponent	Score	Result	Competition
1.	16 September 2016	Estádio do CD Trofense, Trofa, Portugal	Portugal	2–0	2–3	UEFA Women's Euro 2017 qualifying
2.	8 October 2019	Hietalahti Stadium, Vaasa, Finland	Albania	3–0	8–1	UEFA Women's Euro 2022 qualifying
3.	21 October 2021	Mikheil Meskhi Stadium, Tbilisi, Georgia	Georgia	2–0	3–0	2023 FIFA Women's World Cup qualification
4.	22 February 2023	AEK Arena, Larnaca, Cyprus	Romania	4–0	4–0	2023 Cyprus Women's Cup
5.	27 October 2023	Bolt Arena, Helsinki, Finland	Croatia	3–0	3–0	2023–24 UEFA Women's Nations League
6.	8 April 2025	Tammelan Stadion, Tampere, Finland	Hungary	3–0	3–0	2025 UEFA Women's Nations League
7.	30 May 2025	Szent Gellért Fórum, Szeged, Hungary	Belarus	1–0	3–0	2025 UEFA Women's Nations League
8.	9 October 2026	Tammelan Stadion, Tampere, Finland	Serbia	3–1	3–1	2027 FIFA Women's World Cup qualification – UEFA play-offs

== Honours ==
PK-35 Vantaa

- Naisten Liiga: 2012, 2014, 2015
- Finnish Women's Cup: 2012, 2013

Juventus FC

- Serie A: 2017–18

Fortuna Hjørring

- Danish Women's Cup: 2018–2019
- Elitedivisionen: 2019–2020
