= Eevi Sutela =

Finnish footballer (born 2001)

Personal information
- Date of birth: 2 January 2001 (age 25)
- Place of birth: South Savo, Finland
- Position: Midfielder

Youth career
- –2017: PU-62
- 2019: HFA-Märsky

Senior career*
Years	Team	Apps	(Gls)
2018	PK-35	2	(0)
2020–2024	Honka	69	(5)
2024–2025	HB Køge	21	(0)

International career^{‡}
2019	Finland U18	2	(0)
2023–	Finland U23	6	(3)
- * Club domestic league appearances and goals as of 18 June 2025 ‡ National team caps and goals as of 30 December 2024

Eevi Sutela (born 2 January 2001) is a Finnish professional footballer who plays as a midfielder. Sutela is currently a free agent.

== Youth career ==
Sutela developed with Porrassalmen Urheilijat -62 (PU-62) in Mikkeli, the capital of her home province of South Savo, Finland. As a secondary school student at Mäkelänrinne Upper Secondary School (nicknamed Märsky) in Helsinki during the 2019 season, she played with HFA-Märsky, a joint program between the school and the Helsinki Football Academy (HFA).

== Club career ==
In 2018, Sutela made her debut with Helsinki-based PK-35 in the Finnish premier league, the Naisten Liiga (rebranded as Kansallinen Liiga in 2019).

She joined FC Honka in 2020 and played with the club into the 2024 Kansallinen Liiga season. During her time with FC Honka, Sutela recorded five goals across 69 Kansallinen Liiga appearances, and scored three goals across ten Finnish Women's Cup games.

Sutela signed with Danish club HB Køge in August 2024 and made her Danish Women's League debut against Brøndby IF on 25 August 2024.
