= Emma Peuhkurinen =

Finnish footballer (born 1999)

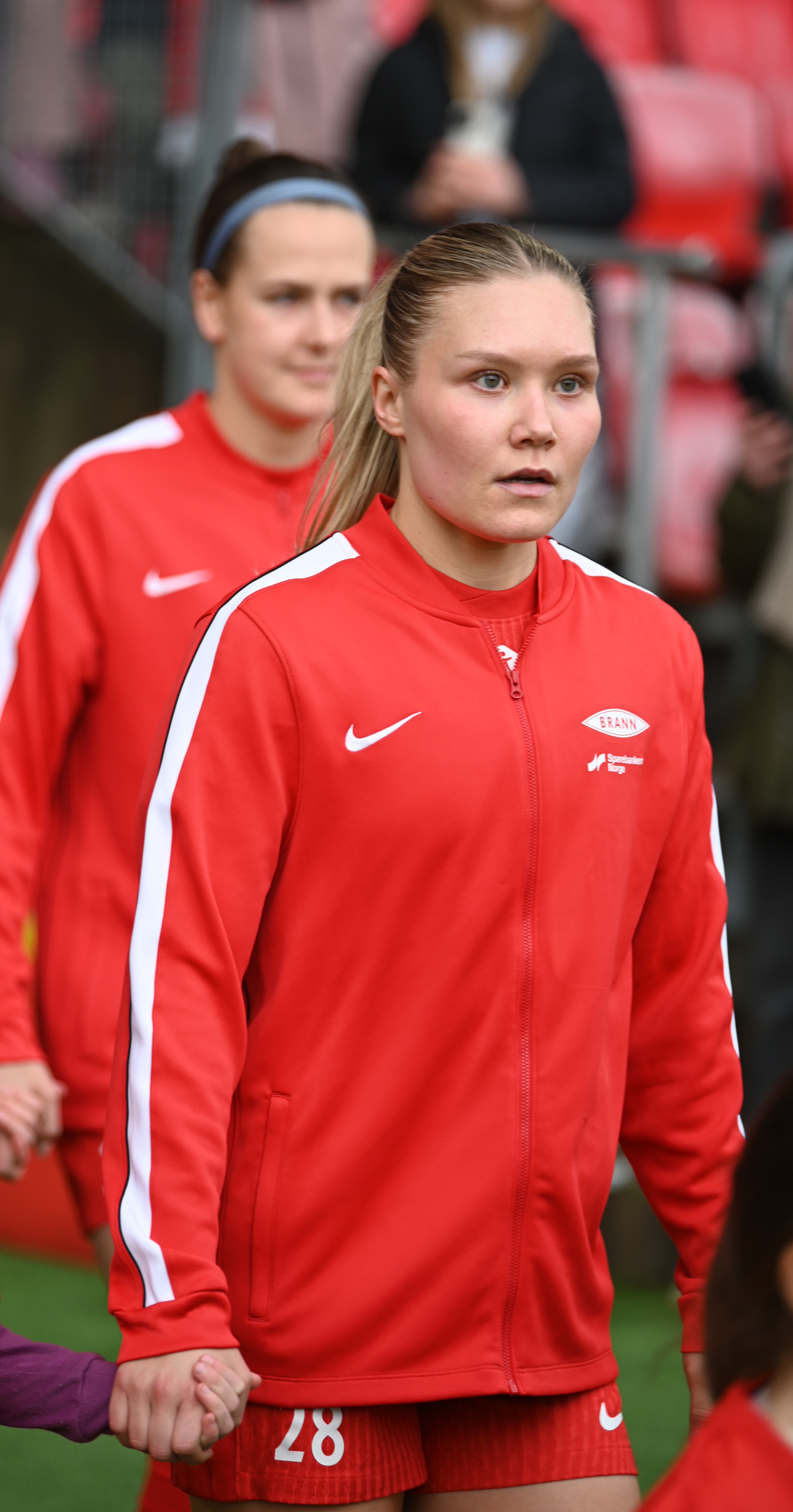
- Peuhkurinen with Brann in 2026

Personal information
- Full name: Emma-Helena Alexandra Peuhkurinen
- Date of birth: 30 November 1999 (age 26)
- Place of birth: Kuopio, Finland
- Position: Midfielder

Team information
- Current team: Brann

Youth career
- ONS

Senior career*
Years	Team	Apps	(Gls)
2015–2019	ONS	58	(6)
2020–2022	KuPS	43	(1)
2023	KIF Örebro	23	(0)
2024–2025	LSK Kvinner	16	(1)
2025–	Brann	0	(0)

International career^{‡}
2021–2022	Finland U23	4	(0)
2022–	Finland	13	(0)
Medal record
Finland
First place	Pinatar Cup	2024
First place	Cyprus Women's Cup	2023
- * Club domestic league appearances and goals as of 29 December 2024 ‡ National team caps and goals as of 15 October 2026

Emma-Helena Alexandra Peuhkurinen (born 30 November 1999) is a Finnish professional footballer who plays as a midfielder for Brann in Toppserien and for the Finland national team.

== Honours ==
KuPS

- Kansallinen Liiga: 2021, 2022

Finland

- Pinatar Cup: 2024
- Cyprus Women's Cup: 2023
