= Brooke Barbuto =

American soccer player

Personal information
- Full name: Brooke Catherine Barbuto
- Date of birth: April 24, 1987 (age 39)
- Place of birth: Syracuse, New York, U.S.
- Height: 1.65 m (5 ft 5 in)
- Position: Midfielder

Team information
- Current team: NiceFutis
- Number: 10

College career
Years	Team	Apps	(Gls)
2005–2008	Stony Brook Seawolves		

Senior career*
Years	Team	Apps	(Gls)
2009	Buffalo Flash	14	(2)
2010	Rochester Ravens	12	(1)
2011	Haukar	15	(9)
2012–2013	GBK Kokkola	44	(27)
2014–	NiceFutis	15	(11)
- * Club domestic league appearances and goals as of July 23, 2014

Brooke Barbuto (born April 24, 1987, in Syracuse, New York) is an American soccer player who currently plays for NiceFutis in the Finnish women's premier division, the Naisten Liiga. She has previously played for Buffalo Flash and Rochester Ravens in the W-League, the Icelandic team Haukar and GBK Kokkola in Finland.
