= Lemlands IF =

Sports club in Lemland, Finland

Lemlands Idrottsförening or Lemlands IF is a Finnish sports club situated in Lemland in Åland. The club is best known for its football section. Lemlands IF is competing in the Swedish Football Division 7. Wilhelm Ingves, a striker of the Finnish Premier Division outfit IFK Mariehamn, is a former youth player of Lemlands IF.

The women's football section of Lemlands IF merged with IF Finströms Kamraterna in 2004. New club Åland United has been playing in the Finnish top division Kansallainen Liiga since 2006. The most notable female footballer of Lemlands IF is Ing-Marie Holmberg, who represented Finland in 21 internationals during the 1990s.
