= Obende =

Obende is a surname. Notable people with the surname include:

- Biodun Obende (born 1987), Nigerian footballer
- Domingo Alaba Obende (born 1954), Nigerian politician
