= Sanna Ylianttila =

Finnish association football player

Personal information
- Date of birth: April 24, 1991 (age 35)
- Place of birth: Rovaniemi, Finland
- Position: Forward

Sanna Ylianttila (born April 24, 1991) is a Finnish footballer who played for Oulu Nice Soccer in the Kansallinen Liiga. She began her career as a goalkeeper and later switched to a striker.

== International career ==
Ylianttila made her debut for Finland in March 2014 in a Cyprus Cup match against England.
