= Taru Laihanen =

Finnish former professional footballer

Personal information
- Date of birth: 15 April 1986 (age 40)
- Place of birth: Hämeenlinna, Finland
- Height: 1.63 m (5 ft 4 in)
- Position: Forward

International career
Years	Team	Apps	(Gls)
2007-2008	Finland	13	(1)

Taru Laihanen (born 15 April 1986) is a Finnish former professional footballer who played as a striker for SGS Essen.

== Club career ==
Laihanen began her career at the age of eight at JJS Hämeenlinna. She later transferred to FC United Pietarsaari and in 2005 to FC Honka. Laihanen won the Kansallinen Liiga twice with FC Honka in 2006 and 2007. In the 2007 season, she became the top scorer for in Kansallinen Liiga with 21 goals. In January 2008, Laihanen moved to Bundesliga club SG Essen. She scored her first Bundesliga goal on her debut for Essen against SG Wattenscheid 09. Liahanen left Essen at the end of the season. At start of the 2009 season, she signed for Helsingin Jalkapalloklubi, and subsequently retired at the end of 2010.

== International career ==
Taru Laihanen represented Finland at the senior level 13 times between 2007 and 2008.
