= Wilhelm Ingves =

Finnish footballer (born 1990)

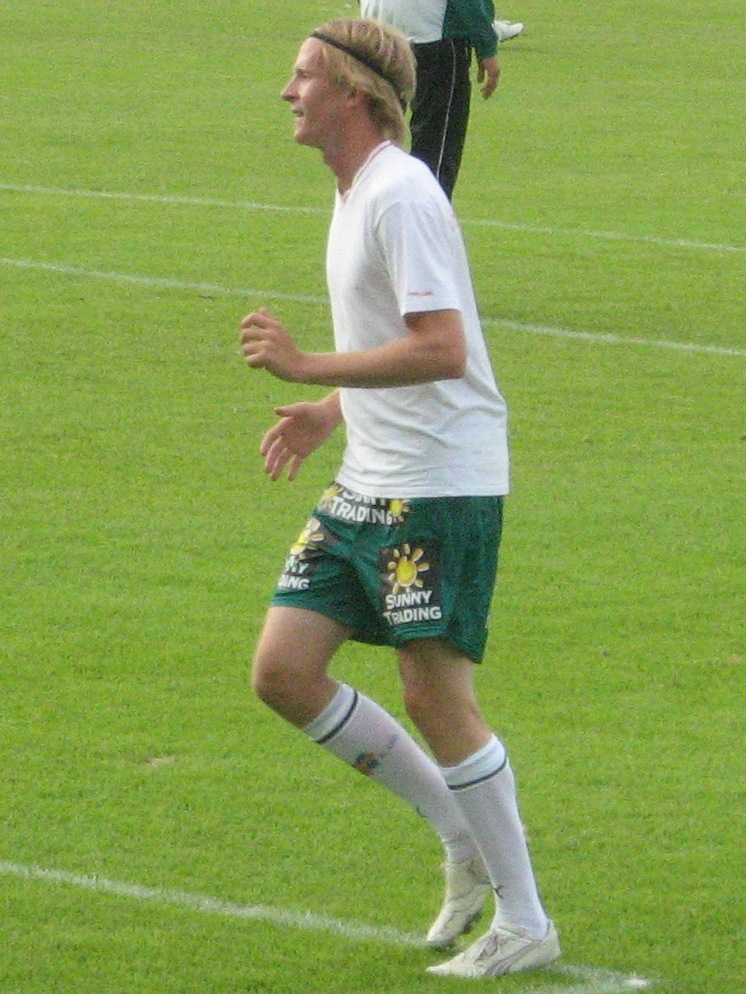

Personal information
- Date of birth: 10 January 1990 (age 36)
- Place of birth: Lemland, Finland
- Height: 6 ft 2 in (1.88 m)
- Position: Striker

Team information
- Current team: Masthuggets BK

Youth career
- Lemlands IF
- IFK Mariehamn

Senior career*
Years	Team	Apps	(Gls)
2008–2012	IFK Mariehamn	95	(9)
2013–2015	IS Halmia	63	(4)
2016–	Masthuggets BK		

International career
- Finland U19
- * Club domestic league appearances and goals as of 1 January 2016

Wilhelm Ingves (born 10 January 1990) is a Finnish footballer who plays as a striker for Masthuggets BK.

== Career ==
=== IFK Mariehamn ===
Ingves scored his first league goal in his first ever league appearance on 4 May 2008 against MyPa. By the end of June 2008, he had already established himself as a first team regular in both his club side and the Finnish U-19 national team.

Ingves was dubbed "Lemlands Ronaldo" by fans of IFK Mariehamn due to his entertaining style of play and scoring ability, Lemland being the municipality he's from.

In August 2008, Ingves was offered a contract by Italian club Ascoli Calcio, which he turned down because he wanted to help his current club secure the contract for the next season's Premier Division.

On 17 November 2008, Ingves joined Heerenveen from the Netherlands for a one-week trial together with Mika Ojala from FC Inter Turku.

Wilhelm Ingves signed a new contract with IFK Mariehamn on 8 September 2009, that will keep him at Wiklöf Holding Arena until the end of the 2010 season. After the 2010 season, Ingves signed a new one-year deal with the club. Before that, he had a test spell with Pomezia Calcio of Italy.

=== IS Halmia ===
Ingves signed for IS Halmia on 8 January 2013.
