= Bogusław Plich =

Polish footballer and manager

Boguslaw Plich
Personal information
- Full name: Boguslaw Henryk Plich
- Date of birth: 2 November 1959 (age 66)
- Place of birth: Łódź, Poland
- Height: 1.80 m (5 ft 11 in)
- Position: Defender

Senior career*
Years	Team	Apps	(Gls)
1978–1982	Widzew Łódź	68	(1)
1982–1983	Legia Warsaw	12	(0)
1983–1984	Gwardia Warsaw		
1984	Start Łódź		
1984–1988	Zagłębie Sosnowiec		
1988–1989	BKS Stal Bielsko-Biała		
1989–1992	Rauman Pallo		

Managerial career
- 2002: Pallo-Iirot
- 2012–2013: FC Rauma (ladies team)
- 2013: NiceFutis
- * Club domestic league appearances and goals

Boguslaw Plich (born 2 November 1959) is a Polish football manager and former professional player.

Plich played in the Polish premier league Ekstraklasa for Widzew Łódź, Legia Warsaw and Zagłębie Sosnowiec. Plich ended his career in Finnish third-tier club Rauman Pallo and has been living in Rauma, Finland ever since. Plich has coached several youth and women's clubs as well as Pallo-Iirot in the Finnish second tier Ykkönen. In June 2013, he was named as the head coach of NiceFutis in the Finnish women's premier division Naisten Liiga.

== Honours ==
Widzew Łódź

- Ekstraklasa: 1980–81, 1981–82
