= NiceFutis =

Finnish football club

- Founded: 1989
- Dissolved: 2020
- Ground: Pori Stadium, Pori
- Capacity: 12,300
- Chairman: Antero Kivelä
- Coach: Kari Latvanen
- 2013: 9th
- Website: http://www.nicefutis.fi/
Home colours	Away colours

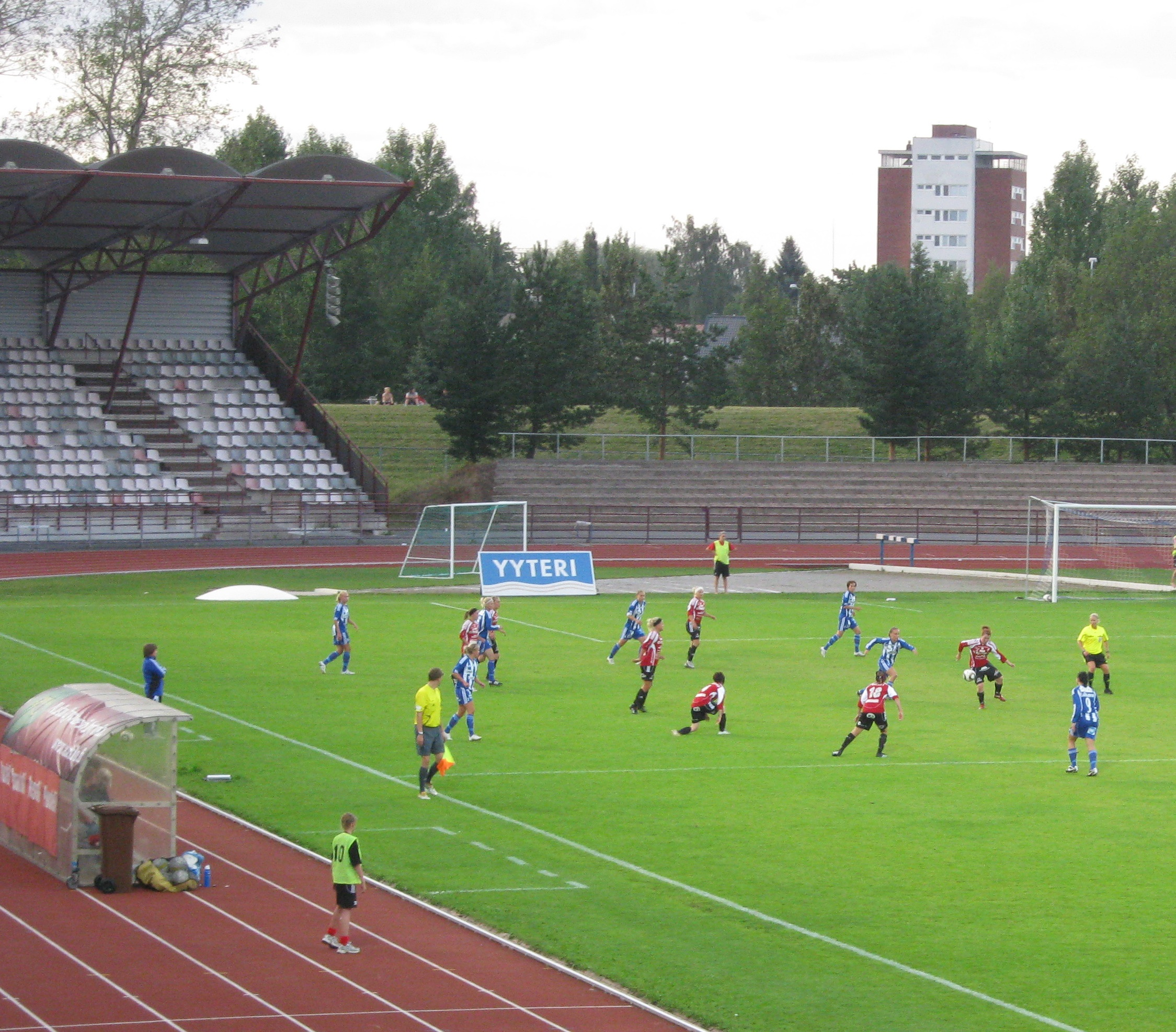
NiceFutis vs. HJK at Pori Stadium in 2010.

NiceFutis was a women's association football club from Pori, Finland. It was established in 1989 as the women's section of PPT Pori was disbanded. NiceFutis played in the Finnish women's premier division Kansallainen Liiga from 2008 to 2016.

The club's name includes a wordplay. The pronunciation of the English word "nice" sounds in Finnish like "nais", the root of the Finnish word for woman ("nainen") when used in compound words. So the name of the club can be understood as "ladies' football" or "nice football".

== League record 2008-2015 ==
Season	Manager	GP	W	D	L	GF	GA	Pts	Pos	Top scorer
2008	(Finland) Jouni Joensuu	22	7	3	12	29	47	24	9.	(Finland) Anna Auvinen, 15
2009	(Finland) Jouni Joensuu	22	9	6	7	34	30	33	5.	(Finland) Kiia Laine, 10
2010	(Finland) Jouni Joensuu	22	9	3	10	44	38	30	6.	(Finland) Anna Auvinen, 18
2011	(Finland) Mikko Mannila	27	7	7	13	27	42	28	5.	(Nigeria) Biodun Obende, 8
2012	(Finland) Sami Rintanen	27	5	3	19	22	64	24	9.	(Nigeria) Hadijat Aliyu, 5
2013	(Finland) Sami Rintanen (Poland) Boguslaw Plich (since 3 June)	24	6	4	14	23	52	22	9.	(Finland) Hanna Ruohomaa, 8
2014	(Finland) Kari Latvanen	24	9	4	11	53	68	31	7.	(United States) Brooke Barbuto, 17
2015	(Finland) Heimo Piira (Finland) Juha Suojanen (since 8 August)	24	5	3	16	33	74	18	8.	(United States) Brooke Barbuto, 8
2016	(Finland) Kari Latvanen									

== See also ==
- Antero Kivelä
