= Biodun Fatoyinbo =

Nigerian pastor (born 1975)

- Born: Biodun Fatoyinbo; 1 January 1975 (age 51); Kwara State, Nigeria
- Occupation: Pastor
- Years active: 1999–present

Biodun Fatoyinbo (born 1 January 1975) is a Nigerian pastor and author. He is the lead pastor of Commonwealth of Zion Assembly (COZA).

== Life ==
He was born into a family of four and attended the University of Ilorin where he started the church in 1999. Fatoyinbo is married to Modele Fatoyinbo

== Health Challenges and Philanthropy ==
In May 2023, Biodun Fatoyinbo publicly confirmed that he had battled a serious health condition, which led to significant weight loss and a temporary withdrawal from public engagements. He credited Bishop David Oyedepo for providing spiritual and personal support during his recovery. Fatoyinbo later resumed his pastoral duties at COZA and expressed gratitude for the prayers and encouragement from his congregation and well-wishers.

Beyond his pastoral work, Fatoyinbo and his wife, Modele Fatoyinbo, have been actively involved in philanthropic efforts through COZA’s charity initiatives. In January 2025, COZA organized an outreach program to support the less privileged, distributing food, clothing, and financial aid to individuals in need.

In August 2025, Fatoyinbo came under public scrutiny for saying that Joseph Ayo Babalola died "poor" despite all his anointing, a statement for which he later apologised to the Christ Apostolic Church and family of Babalola.
