= Jessica Thorn =

Finnish footballer (born 1981)

Personal information
- Full name: Jessica Lagerblom
- Date of birth: 16 December 1981 (age 44)
- Place of birth: Kaarina, Finland
- Position: Midfielder

International career
Years	Team	Apps	(Gls)
	Finland	33	(1)

Jessica Thorn (born 16 December 1981) is a Finnish footballer who played as a midfielder. Thorn represented the Finnish women's national football team, 33 times and scored 1 goal. Thorn was also part of the Finnish team at the 2005 European Championships. Since retiring from football, Lagerblom now works as a physiotherapist and football commentator for Yle Urheilu.
