= Nina Hietanen =

Finnish footballer

Personal information
- Date of birth: 21 August 1985 (age 41)
- Position: Forward

International career
Years	Team	Apps	(Gls)
2008-2009	Finland	13	(1)

Nina Hietanen (born 21 August 1985) is a retired Finnish footballer who played for Åland United, FC Honka and Swedish club Hammarby. Hietanen made 13 appearances for the Finland national team.
