= Anna Auvinen =

Finnish footballer (born 1987)

Personal information
- Full name: Anna Emilia Auvinen
- Date of birth: 2 March 1987 (age 39)
- Place of birth: Pieksämäki, Finland
- Height: 1.63 m (5 ft 4 in)
- Position: Defender

Youth career
- SaPa

Senior career*
Years	Team	Apps	(Gls)
2003–2007	KMF		
2008–2010	NiceFutis	44+	(27+)
2011	KMF	27	(17)
2012–2018	FC Honka	163	(23)
2019	HJK	14	(5)
2019–2021	Inter Milan	32	(0)
2021–2022	Sampdoria	19	(0)

International career^{‡}
2017–2022	Finland	17	(0)
- * Club domestic league appearances and goals as of 13:41, 15 September 2024 (UTC) ‡ National team caps and goals as of 10 February 2022

Anna Emilia Auvinen (born 2 March 1987) is a Finnish former footballer who played as a defender.

She previously played for NiceFutis, FC Honka, HJK of the Naisten Liiga, and the Finland national team. Auvinen also holds a UEFA B coaching badge.

== Club career ==
=== Second spell at KMF ===
She scored on her league debut against Ilves on 10 April 2011, scoring in the 49th minute.

=== FC Honka ===
Auvinen made her league debut against Nice Futis on 14 April 2012.

=== HJK ===
Auvinen joined HJK in January 2019. In February 2019, it was revealed that Auvinen had only missed one match during her career in Finland. She made her league debut against ONS Oulu on 23 March 2019. Auvinen scored her first league goal against TiPS on 30 March 2019, scoring in the 40th minute.

She was part of the team that won the 2019 Finnish Cup.

=== Inter Milan ===
In August 2019 Auvinen agreed on a transfer from HJK to Inter Milan of the Italian Serie A. She made her league debut against Hellas Verona on 14 September 2019.

=== Sampdoria ===
Auvinen made her league debut against Lazio on 29 August 2021.

== International career ==
Auvinen made her debut for the Finland women's national team on 7 April 2017, in a 1–0 defeat by Poland in Pruszków. On 10 June 2019, it was announced that Auvinen had been called up to the Finland squad for two matches against Iceland.

Auvinen was called up to the 2020 Cyprus Women's Cup squad. On 31 March 2021, Auvinen was called up for a training camp that took place between 5 and 12 April. Auvinen was called up in April 2022 for FIFA Women's World Cup 2023 Qualifiers.

She played for Finland at the UEFA Women's Euro 2022.

Auvinen retired from the Finland national team on 22 August 2022.

== Make Mind ==
Auvinen retired in 2022, going on to become a psychological coach and setting up MakeMind with former footballer Laura Hyvönen.
