= Biodun Obende =

Nigerian footballer

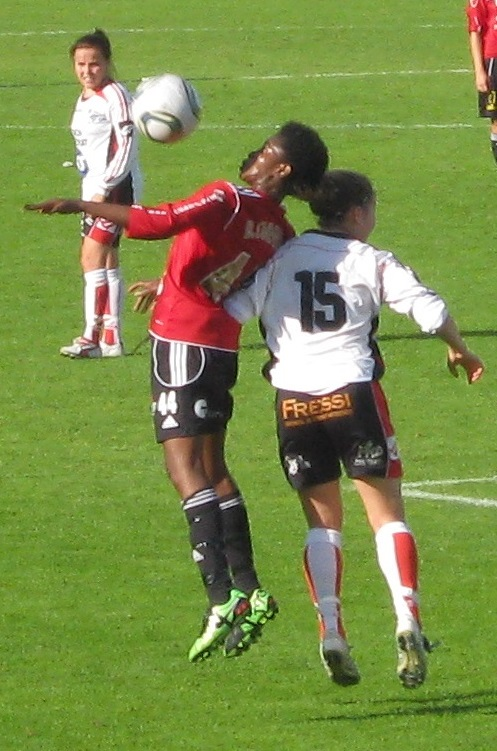
- Obende (left) in 2011

Personal information
- Full name: Biodun Obende
- Date of birth: 14 June 1987 (age 39)
- Place of birth: Ajegunle, Nigeria
- Position: Forward

Senior career*
Years	Team	Apps	(Gls)
–2006	Delta Queens		
2007–2009	Kuopion MimmiFutis		
2010	KPV		
2011–2012	NiceFutis		
- * Club domestic league appearances and goals

Biodun Obende (born 14 June 1987) is a Nigerian former women's footballer who played professionally in Finland.

== Background ==
Obende was born in Ajegunle in 1987 into a polygamous household with nine siblings. She had seven elder brothers and one sister.

She grew up in the midst of seven brothers in a polygamous family of nine. As the baby of the house, she had her elder brothers as playmates and thus, would always join them whenever they go out to play street soccer with their friends.

To keep up with the older ones in the mastery of the game, she would resort to packing sucked oranges in nylon bags to improvise for footballs.

== Professional career ==
She was invited to play football in Finland by Uche Eucharia where she plays with other Nigerians. She arrived in April 2007 and she now plays professionally for Kokkolan Palloveikot. She began to play with the Finnish team NiceFutis and she was the top scorer in that year.
