= Kaarlen kenttä =

Sports venue in Vaasa, Finland

Coordinates: 63°04′58″N 21°38′28″E

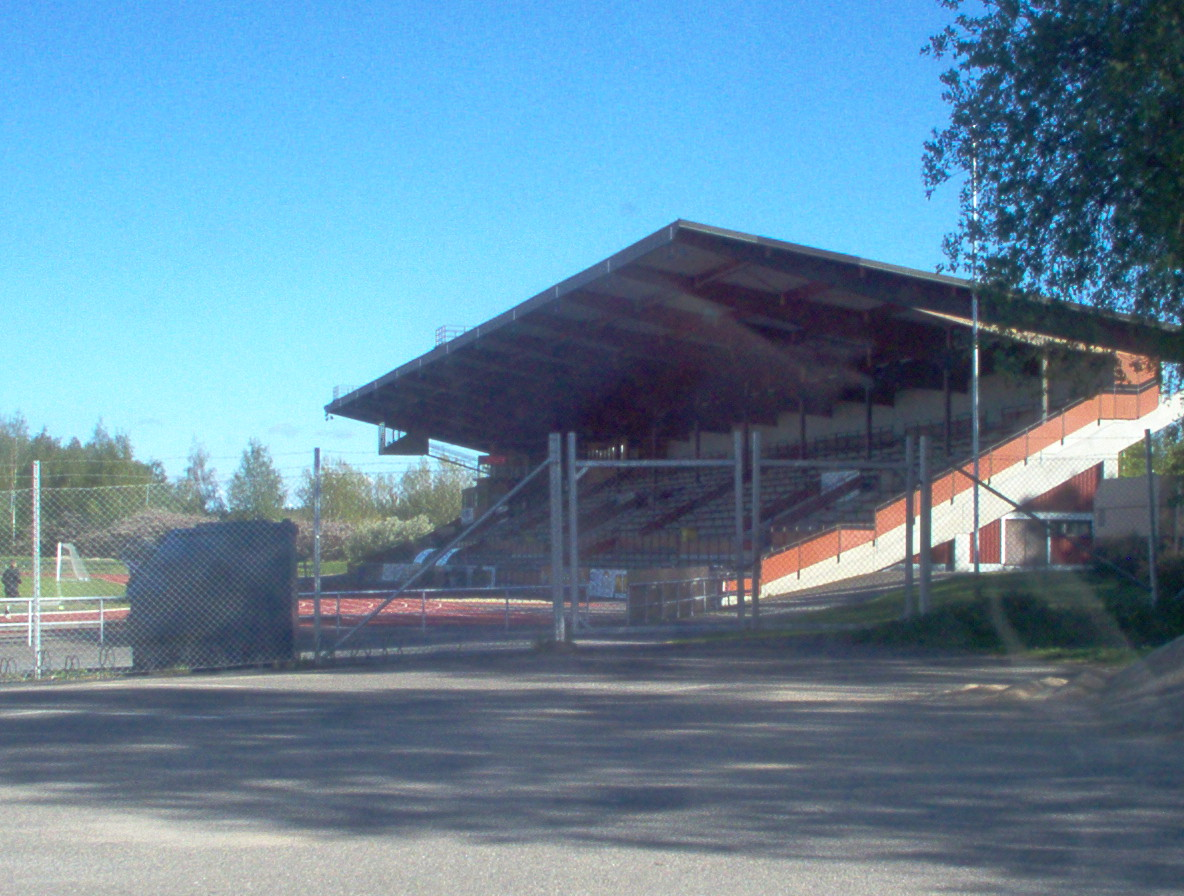
- Interactive map of Kaarlen kenttä
- Location: Vaasa, Finland
- Owner: City of Vaasa
- Capacity: 5,500
- Field size: 105 × 65 m

Tenant
- Vaasan Kiisto

Kaarlen kenttä is a multi-use stadium in Vaasa, Finland. It is currently used mostly for athletics. The stadium holds 7,500 people.
