= Kokkolan keskuskenttä =

Sports venue in Kokkola, Finland

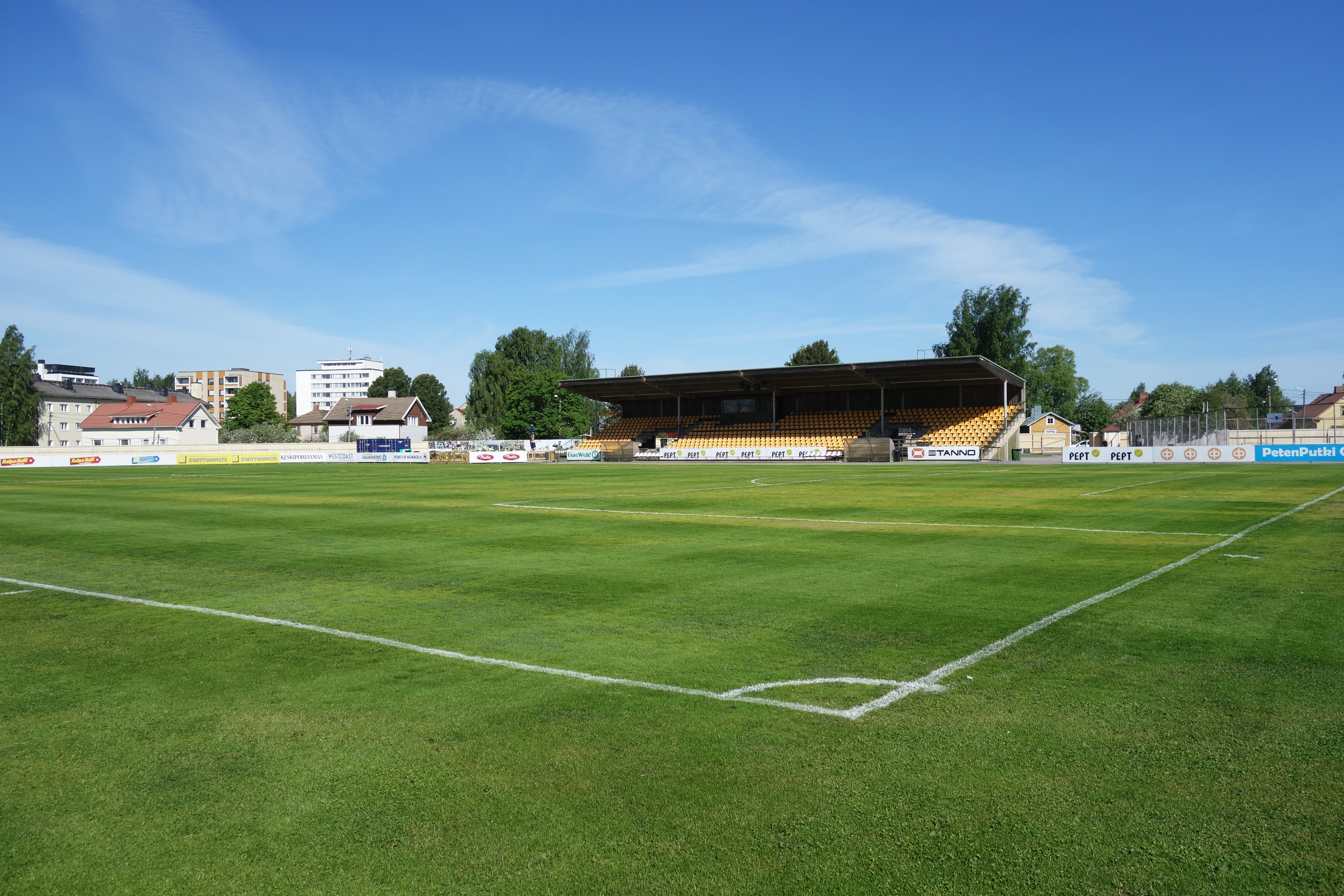
- Interactive map of Kokkolan keskuskenttä
- Full name: Kokkolan keskuskenttä (Kokkola Central Field)
- Location: Kokkola, Finland
- Coordinates: 63°50′31″N 23°7′20″E
- Owner: Kokkola City
- Capacity: 3,000
- Surface: Heated artificial turf
- Scoreboard: Yes
- Field size: 105 x 68 meters

Construction
- Groundbreaking: 1935
- Opened: 1935; 91 years ago
- Renovated: 2020
- Expanded: 2020

Kokkolan keskuskenttä is a football stadium in Kokkola, Finland, with a capacity of 3,000. It is currently used mostly for football matches.

== History ==
In the inaugural match at Kokkola's keskuskenttä on Sunday, July 14, 1935, GBK defeated KPV with a score of 5–0. GBK's Enok Honga scored the first goal in history on the new field during the match.

An attendance record of 5,806 spectators at Kokkola's keskuskenttä took place in a top division match in 1969 between KPV and HJK.

The current spectator capacity of the Central Field is 3,000. It is divided into a covered stand for 686 spectators and a new covered stand for 816 spectators. There are also uncovered stands ("sun stands") at the ends. The original natural grass field was not heated, and the stadium had no lighting. In the 2020 renovation of the Central Field, the natural grass was replaced with heated artificial turf. At the same time, the field was enlarged to dimensions of 105 m × 68 m.

KPV's promotion to the Veikkausliiga for the 2019 season forced the club to develop the conditions at the Central Field. In November 2018, Kokkola's city board announced it would propose investments of approximately €900,000 to the city council. Of this, €700,000 from the 2019 budget was allocated for covered seating and minor field improvements. Playing in the Veikkausliiga requires, for example, covered seating for at least 1,500 people; the league-required lighting was scheduled to arrive at the Central Field only in 2020. Due to the lack of lights, the autumn 2018 promotion playoff match KPV–TPS had to start on Wednesday already at 2 p.m. In November 2019, Kokkola's city council unanimously decided to acquire lighting for the Central Field for the 2020 season.
