= Oulu Nice Soccer =

Finnish football club

ONS
- Founded: 2006
- Ground: Castrén Stadium, Oulu
- Capacity: 4 000 (700 seated)
- Coach: Jussi Madetoja
- League: Kansallinen Liiga
- 2023: 10th in Kansallinen Liiga

Oulu Nice Soccer (abbr. ONS) is a women's association football club from Oulu, Finland, currently playing in the Finnish women's premier division Kansallinen Liiga.

== Current squad ==
As of 11 June 2019 Note: Flags indicate national team as defined under FIFA eligibility rules; some limited exceptions apply. Players may hold more than one non-FIFA nationality.

No.	Pos.	Nation	Player
1	GK	FIN	Matilda Nurmi
3	DF	FIN	Satu Rousti
4	FW	FIN	Stina Virkkala
5	MF	FIN	Julia Angerla
6		FIN	Heini Toivonen
7		FIN	Hulda Kuustie
8	MF	FIN	Lotta Niemelä
10	MF	FIN	Veera Vääräkoski
11	MF	FIN	Silja Tuominen
13		FIN	Aino Kela
14	DF	FIN	Ida Ruuskanen
15	MF	FIN	Heta Olmala

No.	Pos.	Nation	Player
16	FW	FIN	Elle Poukkula
17	FW	FIN	Anna Olmala
18		FIN	Emma Peuhkurinen
19		FIN	Vilma Peuhkurinen
20	FW	FIN	Ruusa Portaankorva
22	DF	FIN	Jenna Vaaraniemi
23	DF	FIN	Tiia Mensonen
24	DF	FIN	Roosa Immonen
32	GK	FIN	Eerika Viitanen
41	GK	FIN	Pilvi Pikivirta

== Notable former players ==
- (South Africa) Ode Fulutudilu
