= Kansallinen Ykkönen =

Finnish women's football league

Kansallinen Ykkönen Nationella Ettan
- Organising body: Suomen Palloliitto
- Founded: as Naisten I divisioona, 1984 as Naisten Ykkönen, 1996 as Kansallinen Ykkönen, 2025
- Country: Finland
- Confederation: UEFA
- Number of clubs: 10
- Level on pyramid: 2
- Promotion to: Kansallinen Liiga
- Relegation to: Naisten Kakkonen
- Current champions: Ilves (2025)
- Website: https://www.kansallinenliiga.fi/kansallinen-ykkonen/

Kansallinen Ykkönen (Swedish: Nationella Ettan, National First/One) is the second highest division of women's football in Finland. It is overseen by the Suomen Palloliitto (Football Association of Finland). Teams in Kansallinen Ykkönen can gain promotion to the top-tier Kansallinen Liiga or be relegated to the third-tier Naisten Kakkonen. At the conclusion of the 2025 season, Ilves gained promotion to the Kansallinen Liiga as champions of the Kansallinen Ykkönen. Conversely, RoPS was relegated to the Naisten Kakkonen at the conclusion of the 2025 season.

== History ==
The league was founded in 1984 as the Naisten I divisioona (Women's Division 1). The league was preceded by the Naisten perussarja (Women's Base Series), which played during 1973–1980, and the Naisten aluesarja (Women's Regional Series), which played during 1981–1983. Naisten I divisioona was renamed “Naisten Ykkönen” in 1996. Naisten Ykkönen was renamed "Kansallinen Ykkönen" in 2025.

The start of the 2020 Naisten Ykkönen season was delayed by the COVID-19 pandemic and there was some concern early on that the season may need to be cancelled. However, the concerns were not realized and on 15 May 2020, the Football Association of Finland announced that the 2020 Naisten Ykkönen season would be played with a modified format, a single round-robin series (11 matches) and three regional blocks of four teams, played as a double round-robin series (6 matches), for a total of 17 rounds.

== Format ==
Kansallinen Ykkönen comprises ten teams in the regular season. The teams play in a double round-robin series for a total of 18 rounds. After this the top four teams go into a six team promotion/relegation single round-robin series with the bottom two teams of Kansallinen Liiga. The two top ranked teams of the series remain in/are promoted to Kansallinen Liiga the next season, while the bottom four remain in/are relegated to Kansallinen Ykkönen. The bottom six Kansallinen Ykkönen teams play a single round-robin relegation round series, after which the worst placed team gets relegated to Naisten Kakkonen, while the second worst-rated team goes into a two legged play-off against the best placed Naisten Kakkonen team. In total, one to four teams are changed from one season to the next.

== 2026 season ==
=== Teams 2026 ===
TN is the standard Finnish abbreviation for artificial turf (Finnish: tekonurmi)

Club	Location	Home ground	Head coach
Esbo Bollklubb (EBK)	Espoo	Keski-Espoon urheilupuisto	(Finland) Arber Istrefi
FC Honka	Espoo	Tapiolan urheilupuisto	(Finland) Peetu Lepistö
FC KTP	Kotka	Arto Tolsa Areena	(Finland) Jari-Pekka Gummerus
FC Lahti	Lahti	Lahden kisapuisto	(Finland) Teemu Virtanen
HJK Akatemia	Helsinki	Töölö Football Stadium	(Finland) Jan Berg
Hämeenlinnan Jalkapalloseura (HJS)	Hämeenlinna	Pulleri TN 1	(Finland) Peter Sampo
Oulu Nice Soccer (ONS)	Oulu	Castrén	(Finland) Tapio Haapaniemi
Pallokerho Keski-Uusimaa (PKKU)	Kerava	Hyrylän urheilukeskus	(Finland) Panu Turpeinen
Turun Palloseura (TPS)	Turku	Turun Urheilupuiston yläkenttä	(Finland) Silja Lukkarinen
Jyväskylän Pallokerho (JyPK)	Jyväskylä	Viitaniemi TN	(England) Robert Mitchell

Source: Suomen Palloliitto
