= Tapiolan urheilupuisto =

Sports complex in Espoo, Finland

Tapiolan urheilupuisto (Finnish)
- Public sports complex
- Tapiola Sports Park
- Hagalunds idrottspark (Swedish)
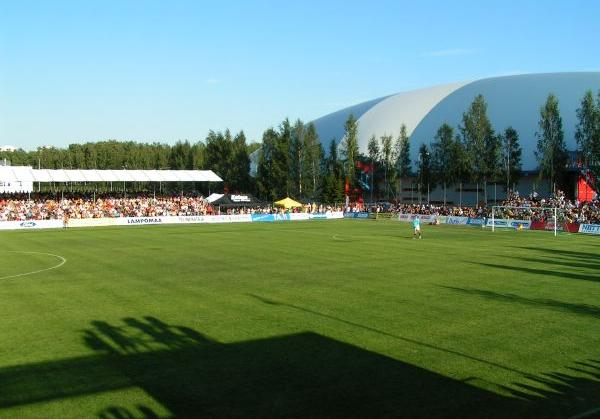
- The Tapiola football stadium in 2007. The Esport Arena can be seen in the background.
- Features: Espoo Metro Areena; Tapiola Football Stadium; Tapiola Training Arena; Esport Arena
- Amenities: grass football pitch; 3 turf football fields; training ice rink; indoor sports halls; athletics venues
- Manager: City of Espoo
- Location: Tapiola, Espoo, Finland
- Address: Urheilupuistontie; 02200 Espoo
- Interactive map of Tapiolan urheilupuisto (Finnish)
- Coordinates: 60°10′45″N 24°46′53″E

Tapiolan urheilupuisto (Swedish: Hagalunds idrottspark, 'Tapiola Sports Park') is a sports park in the Tapiola district of Espoo, Finland. The park includes several sports halls and football pitches, as well as the multipurpose Espoo Metro Areena. The Urheilupuisto metro station, which connects the park to the Länsimetro, was opened in 2017.

== Football fields ==
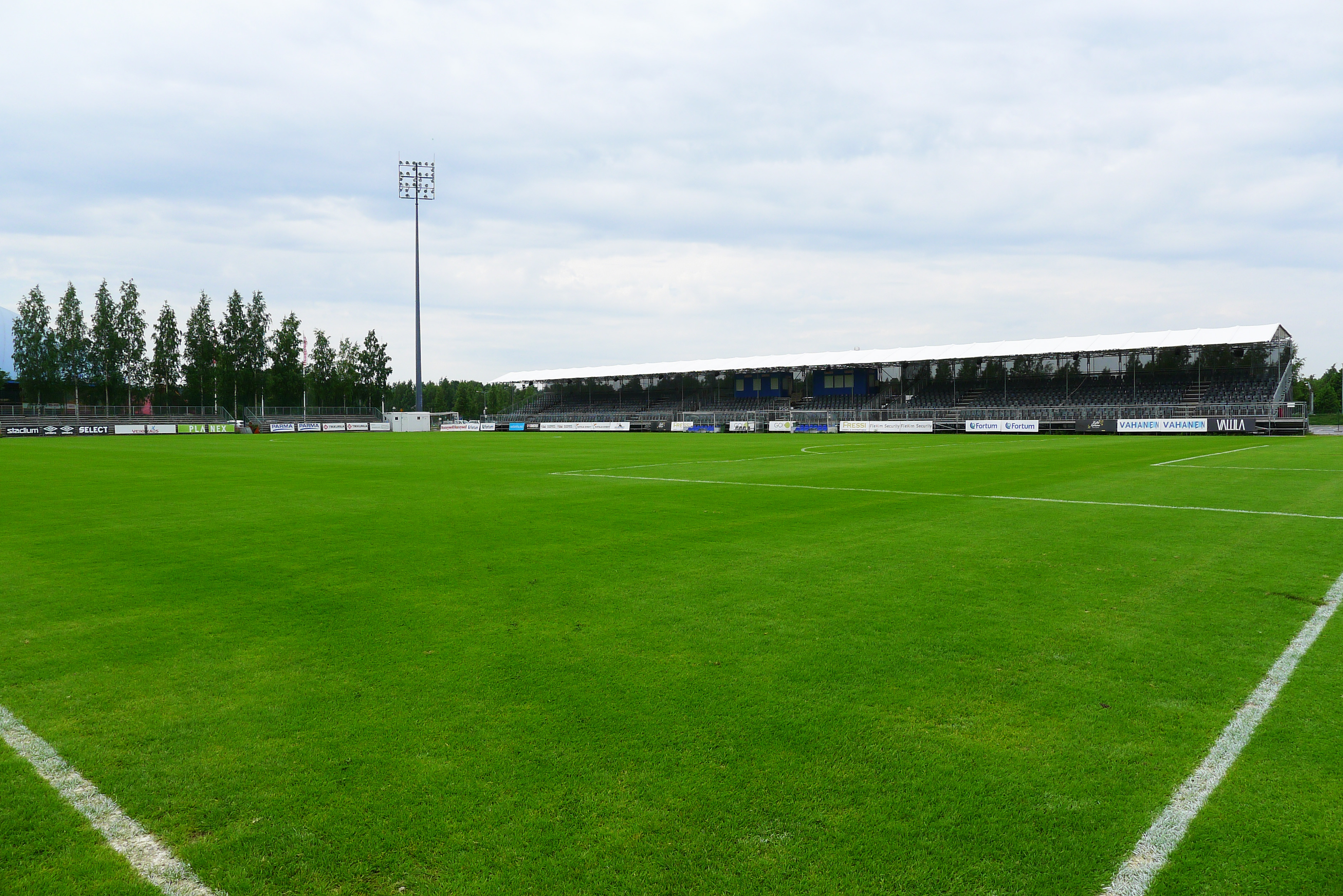
The football stadium in June 2013.

The park includes the home stadium of the football teams FC Honka of the Veikkausliiga and FC Honka Naiset of the Kansallinen Liiga. The stadium was built in 1970 and later expanded in 2007. It is owned by the City of Espoo and seats 4,100. The pitch measures 104 m x 67 m.

There are several other football pitches and practice fields, surfaced with grass or artificial turf with sand infill, in the Tapiola Sports Park. They are available to the public and are used for both training and matches.

== Esport ==
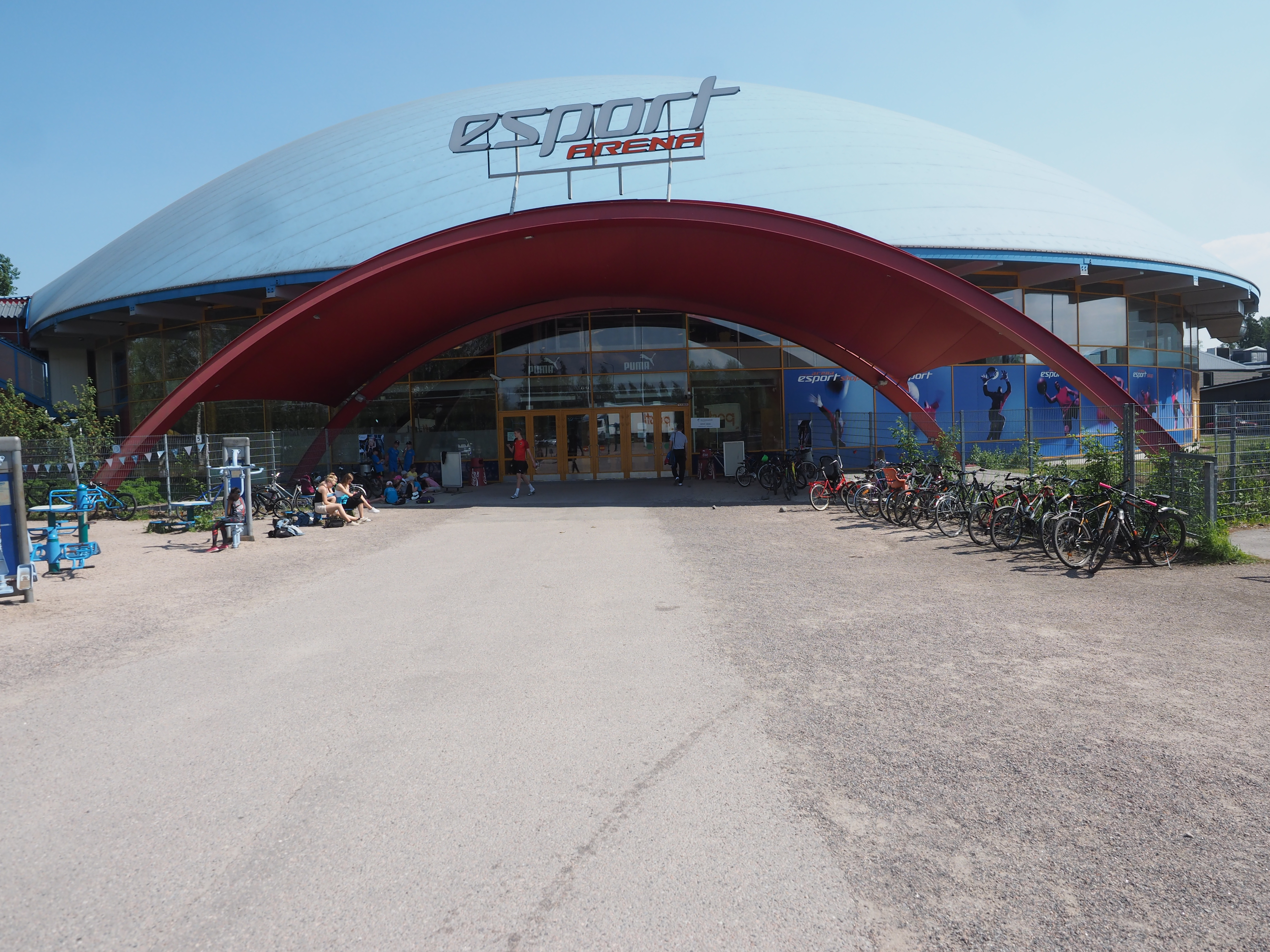
Esport Arena is a sports center in Tapiolan urheilupuisto.

Esport is a fitness and exercise company that operates six sports centers across Greater Helsinki. The two Esport locations at Tapiolan Urheilupuisto, Esport Center and Esport Arena, together constitute one of the largest indoor sports centers in the Nordic countries, covering over 55,000 m^{2} (590,000 sq ft).

=== Esport Center ===
Esport Center was opened in 1981 and the adjoining Esport Fitness Center was opened in 1983. Comprising over 20,000 m^{2} (220,000 sq ft), the center features two gyms with diverse training options; more than 50 racket sport courts, including thirteen indoor and two outdoor tennis courts, sixteen badminton courts and six squash courts; a selection of group sports facilities, including the HotStudio for hot yoga and pilates and the TripStudio for Les Mills The Trip indoor cycling classes; the Esport Pro Shop, a sports equipment store; and the Esport Café.

Espoo Center houses the OVO Training Center, a facility used by the gymnastics club Olarin Voimistelijat ry (OVO), which boasts one of the top aesthetic group gymnastics teams in the world.

The center serves as physical headquarters to the Espoo Squash Rackets Club (ESRC), the largest squash club in Finland.

==== Extreme Esport ====
Extreme Esport was opened at the Esport Center in 2018. It offers a wide range of indoor athletic activities and games including a giant trampoline area, a "Ninja Warrior" obstacle course, dodgeball courts, a ropes course, and a foam pit.

== Espoo Metro Areena ==
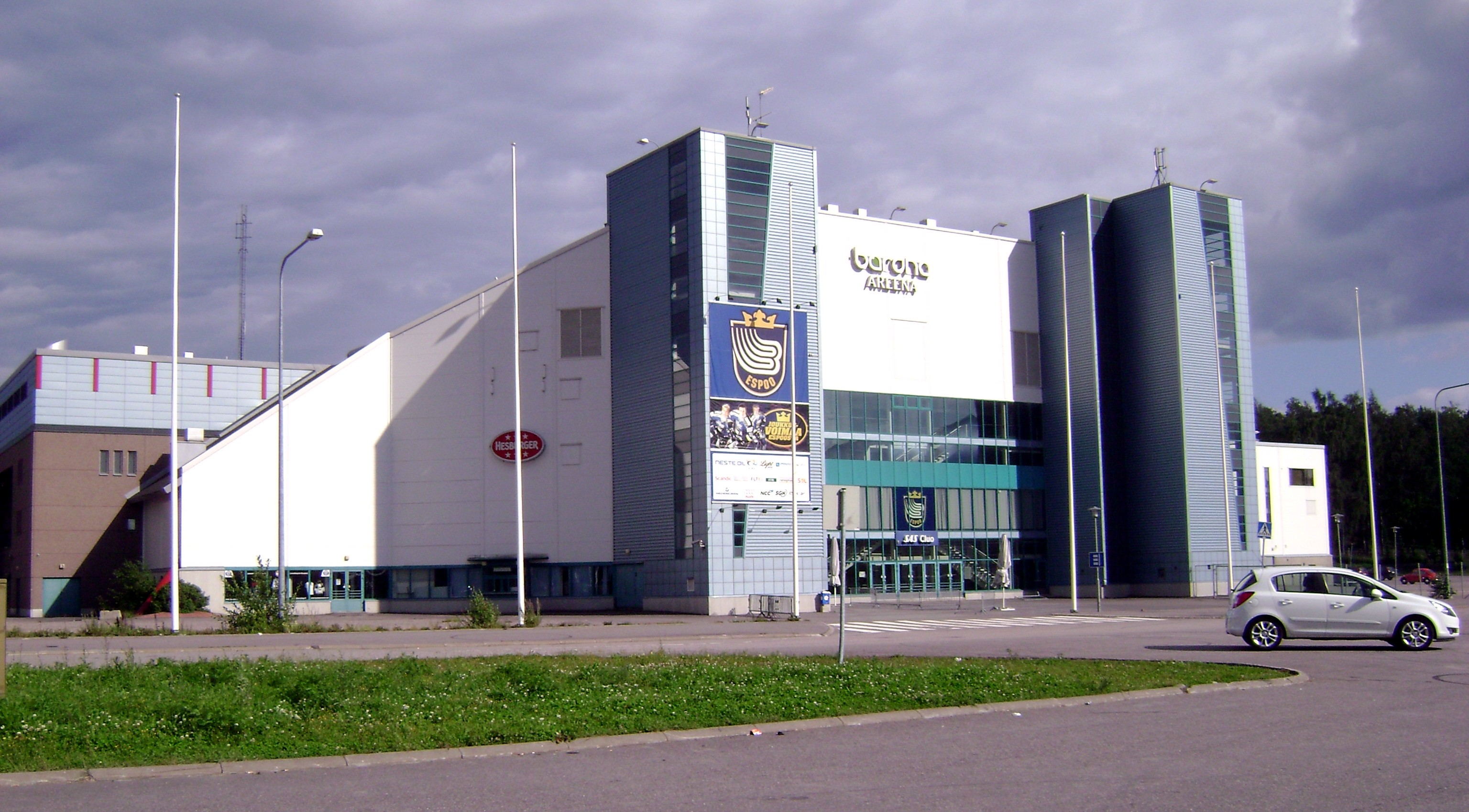
Espoo Metro Arena under its previous name, Barona-areena, in 2009.

Espoo Metro Areena (previously Barona-areena) is a privately owned sports arena located in the Tapiolan Urheilupuisto. The arena has been primarily used for ice hockey and it was the home arena of the Espoo Blues of the Liiga from 1999 to 2016, and of Espoo United of the Mestis from 2016 until the franchise was dissolved in 2018. It is able to accommodate 6,982 seats for ice hockey games and 8,000 for concerts.

Espoo hosted the 2019 IIHF Women's World Championship and all games were played at Espoo Metro Areena.
