= Åland United =

Finnish football team

- Founded: 2004
- Ground: Wiklöf Holding Arena; Mariehamn, Åland; Finland
- Capacity: 4 000 (1 600 seated)
- Coach: Daniel Norrmén
- League: Kansallinen Liiga
- 2025: 3rd
Home colours	Away colours

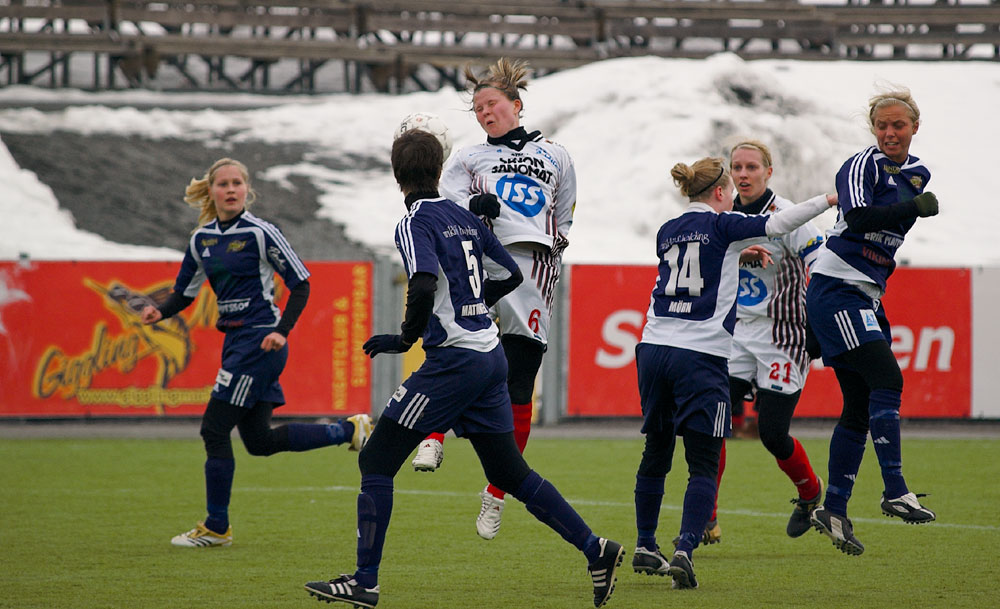
KMF – Åland United (in blue)

Åland United is a Finnish women's football club based in Lemland, Åland. They compete in the Kansallinen Liiga, the premier women's football league in Finland.

In 2004 Åland's clubs Lemlands IF and IF Finströms Kamraterna decided to strengthen the women's football in the region. Their combined team operated under Lemlands IF using the name Åland United. United managed promotion to the top national women's league, the Naisten Liiga, in 2005. In 2008 other Ålandic clubs Sunds IF, IFK Mariehamn and Saltviks IF joined in the cooperation and Åland United became an independent, pure women's football club.

In 2009 Åland United won the championship and played in the 2010–11 UEFA Women's Champions League. They started in the round of 32 and lost both legs to reigning champion Turbine Potsdam. In subsequent seasons Åland United has been 3rd (2010), 4th (2011), 2nd (2012) and champions (2013)

== Titles ==
- Finnish League Champions (3): 2009, 2013, 2020,
- Finnish Women's Cup (3): 2020, 2021, 2022

Record in UEFA competitions
Season	Competition	Stage	Result	Opponent
2010–11	Champions League	Round of 32	0–9, 0–6	(Germany) Turbine Potsdam
2014–15	Champions League	Qualifying round	4–0	(North Macedonia) ŽFK Kochani
2014–15	Champions League	Qualifying round	0–7	(Poland) Medyk Konin
2014–15	Champions League	Qualifying round	0–1	(Bosnia and Herzegovina) SFK 2000
2021–22	Champions League	First qualifying round	4–0	(Romania) Olimpia Cluj
2021–22	Champions League	First qualifying round	0–1	(Switzerland) Servette Chênois

== Current squad ==
As of 20 September 2023

Note: Flags indicate national team as defined under FIFA eligibility rules; some limited exceptions apply. Players may hold more than one non-FIFA nationality.

No.	Pos.	Nation	Player
1	GK	FIN	Jessica Kiviaho
2	DF	USA	Hailey Whitaker
7	DF	FIN	Anna Nurmi
8	MF	FIN	Louise Andersson
9	DF	FIN	Anni Miettunen
10	MF	FIN	Silja Tuominen
12	GK	MEX	Maria Garcia
14	FW	FIN	Aada Törrönen
17	MF	FIN	Riika Lilja
18	DF	FIN	Senja Salo

No.	Pos.	Nation	Player
20	FW	FIN	Elin Lindström
21	MF	FIN	Anni Hakasalo
24	DF	AXL	Casja Kronström
26	FW	FIN	Tilda Råtts
