= Kansallinen Liiga =

Premier women's football league in Finland

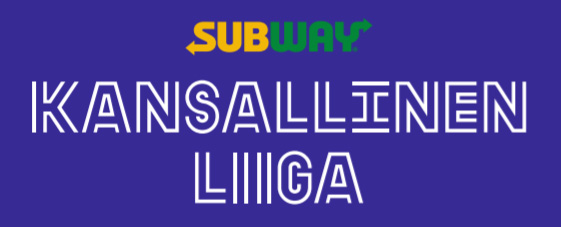
- Organising body: Finnish Football Association
- Founded: 1974
- First season: as Naisten SM-sarja, 1974 as Naisten Liiga, 2006 as Kansallinen Liiga, 2020
- Country: Finland
- Confederation: UEFA
- Number of clubs: 10
- Level on pyramid: 1
- Relegation to: Kansallinen Ykkönen
- Domestic cup: Finnish Women's Cup
- International cup: UEFA Champions League
- Current champions: HJK Helsinki (2025)
- Most championships: HJK (25)
- Top scorer: (North Macedonia) Gentjana Rochi (169 goals)
- Broadcaster: Ruutu
- Sponsor: Subway
- Website: kansallinenliiga.fi
- Current: 2026 Kansallinen Liiga

The Kansallinen Liiga ('National League'), also officially known as Briotech Kansallinen liiga for sponsorship reasons, is the premier division of women's football in Finland. It was previously called the Jalkapallon naisten SM-sarja ('Women's Football Finnish Championship Series') during 1974 to 2006 and the Naisten Liiga (Swedish: Damligan, 'Women's League') during 2006 to 2019. The first season under the name Kansallinen Liiga was played in 2020.

== Teams 2026 ==
| Club | Location | Home ground | Head coach |
|---|---|---|---|
| Helsingin Jalkapalloklubi (HJK) | Helsinki | Telia 5G Arena | (Finland) Jonne-Jussi Kunnas |
| Kuopion Palloseura (KuPS) | Kuopio | Savon Sanomat Areena | (Finland) Ollipekka Ojala |
| Helsingin Palloseura (HPS) | Helsinki | Hofs Areena | (Finland) Antti Ruonala |
| Åland United | Lemland | Wiklöf Holding Arena | (Sweden) Daniel Norrmén |
| PK-35 Vantaa | Vantaa | Myyrmäen jalkapallostadion | (Finland) Riku Remes |
| Ilves | Tampere | Tammela Stadion | (Finland) Joonas Laurikainen |
| IF Gnistan | Helsinki | Markku.fi Areena | (Greece) Nikos Kalaitzis |
| Vasa IFK (VIFK) | Vaasa | Lemonsoft Stadion | (Finland) Tomi Kärkkäinen |

== List of champions ==
PK-35 Vantaa were Naisten Liiga Finnish Champions six times, Helsingin Jalkapalloklubi have won the most Finnish Champion women's titles.

=== Naisten SM-sarja champions 1971–2006 ===
Previous champions of Finland.

- 1971 – Helsingin Jalkapalloklubi
- 1972 – Helsingin Jalkapalloklubi
- 1973 – Helsingin Jalkapalloklubi
- 1974 – Helsingin Jalkapalloklubi
- 1975 – Helsingin Jalkapalloklubi
- 1976 – Kemin Into
- 1977 – Kemin Into
- 1978 – TPS Turku
- 1979 – Helsingin Jalkapalloklubi
- 1980 – Helsingin Jalkapalloklubi
- 1981 – Helsingin Jalkapalloklubi
- 1982 – Puotinkylän Valtti
- 1983 – Puotinkylän Valtti
- 1984 – Helsingin Jalkapalloklubi
- 1985 – Kaunis Nainen Futis
- 1986 – Helsingin Jalkapalloklubi
- 1987 – Helsingin Jalkapalloklubi
- 1988 – Helsingin Jalkapalloklubi
- 1989 – PP-Futis
- 1990 – Helsinki United
- 1991 – Helsingin Jalkapalloklubi
- 1992 – Helsingin Jalkapalloklubi
- 1993 – Kontulan Urheilijat
- 1994 – Malmin Palloseura
- 1995 – Helsingin Jalkapalloklubi
- 1996 – Helsingin Jalkapalloklubi
- 1997 – Helsingin Jalkapalloklubi
- 1998 – Helsingin Jalkapalloklubi
- 1999 – Helsingin Jalkapalloklubi
- 2000 – Helsingin Jalkapalloklubi
- 2001 – Helsingin Jalkapalloklubi
- 2002 – FC United
- 2003 – Malmin Palloseura
- 2004 – FC United
- 2005 – Helsingin Jalkapalloklubi
- 2006 – FC Honka

=== Naisten Liiga champions 2007–2019 ===
- 2007 – FC Honka
- 2008 – FC Honka
- 2009 – Åland United
- 2010 – PK-35 Vantaa
- 2011 – PK-35 Vantaa
- 2012 – PK-35 Vantaa
- 2013 – Åland United
- 2014 – PK-35 Vantaa
- 2015 – PK-35 Vantaa
- 2016 – PK-35 Vantaa
- 2017 – FC Honka
- 2018 – PK-35 Vantaa
- 2019 – Helsingin Jalkapalloklubi

=== Kansallinen Liiga champions 2020– ===
- 2020 – Åland United
- 2021 – KuPS
- 2022 – KuPS
- 2023 – KuPS
- 2024 – Helsingin Jalkapalloklubi
- 2025 – Helsingin Jalkapalloklubi
- 2026 – TBD

== Top scorers 2007–present ==
| Season | Player | Club | Goals |
|---|---|---|---|
| 2007 | (Finland) Taru Laihanen | FC Honka | 21 |
| 2008 | (Finland) Nina Hietanen | FC Kuusysi | 18 |
| 2009 | (Nigeria) Rita Chikwelu | FC United | 22 |
| 2010 | (Finland) Anna Auvinen | NiceFutis | 18 |
| 2011 | (United States) Felicia Schroeder | Åland United | 22 |
| 2012 | (United States) Manya Makoski | Åland United | 31 |
| 2013 | (Nigeria) Cynthia Uwak | Åland United | 18 |
| 2014 | (Finland) Sanna Saarinen | PK-35 Vantaa | 20 |
| 2015 | (Finland) Heidi Kollanen | Ilves | 24 |
| 2016 | (Finland) Sanni Franssi | PK-35 Vantaa | 20 |
| 2017 | (Finland) Kaisa Collin | PK-35 Vantaa | 20 |
| 2018 | (North Macedonia) Gentjana Rochi | JyPK | 20 |
| 2019 | (Finland) Jutta Rantala | HJK | 22 |
| 2020 | (North Macedonia) Gentjana Rochi | KuPS | 16 |
| 2021 | (North Macedonia) Gentjana Rochi | KuPS | 26 |
| 2022 | (Albania) Lavdije Begolli | KuPS | 25 |
| 2023 | (Finland) Lotta Lindström | HJK | 15 |
| 2024 | (North Macedonia) Gentjana Rochi | KuPS | 15 |
| 2025 | (Finland) Ria Karjalainen | HPS | 18 |

Most time top goalscorers

- 4 times
  - (North Macedonia) Gentjana Rochi (2018, 2020, 2021 and 2024).

Most goals by a player in a single season

- 31 goals
  - (United States) Manya Makoski (2012)

== See also ==
- Football Association of Finland
