= FC Honka (women) =

Finnish football team

- Full name: Football Club Honka Naiset
- Founded: 1975
- Ground: Tapiolan Urheilupuisto, Espoo
- Capacity: 6,000
- Manager: Omar Adlani
- League: Kansallinen Liiga
- 2024: 8th
- Website: https://www.fchonkanaiset.fi/
Home colours	Away colours

FC Honka Naiset is a Finnish women's football team representing FC Honka Espoo in the top-tier Kansallinen Liiga.

They were promoted to the top division for the first time in 2002, and won three successive titles in 2006, 2007 and 2008. In 2017 they again won the title.

== Honours ==
- 4 Finnish Leagues (2006, 2007, 2008, 2017)
- 3 Finnish Cups (2009, 2014, 2015)

Record in UEFA competitions
Season	Competition	Stage	Result	Opponent
2007–08	UEFA Women's Cup	First qualifying round	1–2	(Iceland) Valur
			1–0	(Netherlands) ADO Den Haag
			4–1	(Faroe Islands) KÍ Klaksvík
2008–09	UEFA Women's Cup	First qualifying round	0–2	(Norway) Røa IL
			6–0	(Bulgaria) NSA Sofia
2009–10	UEFA Women's Champions League	Round of 32	1–8 0–8	(Germany) Turbine Potsdam
2018-19	UEFA Women's Champions League	Qualifying round	1-1	Gintra
			5-0	NSA Sofia
			7-0	EB/Streymur/Skála
		Round of 32	0-1 0-5	Zürich

== Current squad ==
As of 1 April 2023. Note: Flags indicate national team as defined under FIFA eligibility rules; some limited exceptions apply. Players may hold more than one non-FIFA nationality.

No.	Pos.	Nation	Player
1	GK	FIN	Sofia Manner
2	DF	FIN	Aino Nurmi
4	DF	FIN	Daniela Sandås
5	DF	FIN	Sanra Pulliainen
6	MF	FIN	Ida Heikkinen
7	MF	FIN	Saara Lappalainen
8	MF	FIN	Aino Vuorinen
9	FW	FIN	Elli Seiro
10	FW	FIN	Jasmin Leppioja
12	GK	FIN	Liisa Tuomi (on loan to Lidköpings SK)
13	FW	FIN	Ada Eronen
15	DF	FIN	Inka Kaivola

No.	Pos.	Nation	Player
16	DF	FIN	Iida Laine
17	MF	FIN	Matilda Kuusniemi Fishwick
19	MF	CAN	Dakota Chan
19	DF	FIN	Annika Idman
23	MF	FIN	Noora Juusela
28	MF	FIN	Eevi Sutela
30	FW	USA	Jackie Altschuld
33	FW	FIN	Wilma Sjöholm
34	DF	FIN	Venla Lamberg
42	DF	FIN	Noora Hämäläinen
70	GK	FIN	Veera Tammi
88	DF	FIN	Nana Yang
