= 2015 Cyprus Women's Cup squads =

List of players competing at the 8th edition of the Cyprus Women's Cup

This article lists the squads for the 2015 Cyprus Women's Cup, the 8th edition of the Cyprus Women's Cup. The cup consisted of a series of friendly games, and was held in Cyprus from 4 to 11 March 2015. The twelve national teams involved in the tournament registered a squad of 23 players.

The age listed for each player is on 4 March 2015, the first day of the tournament. The numbers of caps and goals listed for each player do not include any matches played after the start of tournament. The club listed is the club for which the player last played a competitive match prior to the tournament. The nationality for each club reflects the national association (not the league) to which the club is affiliated. A flag is included for coaches that are of a different nationality than their own national team.

== Group A ==
=== Canada ===
Coach: (England) John Herdman

The squad was announced on 23 February 2015.

No.	Pos.	Player	Date of birth (age)	Club
1	GK	Erin McLeod	February 26, 1983 (aged 32)	(United States Soccer Federation) Houston Dash
2	DF	Emily Zurrer	July 12, 1987 (aged 27)	(Swedish Football Association) Jitex
3	DF	Kadeisha Buchanan	November 5, 1995 (aged 19)	(United States Soccer Federation) West Virginia Mountaineers
4	DF	Carmelina Moscato	May 2, 1984 (aged 30)	Unattached
5	DF	Robyn Gayle	October 31, 1985 (aged 29)	Unattached
6	MF	Kaylyn Kyle	October 6, 1988 (aged 26)	(United States Soccer Federation) Portland Thorns
7	DF	Rhian Wilkinson	May 12, 1982 (aged 32)	(United States Soccer Federation) Portland Thorns
9	FW	Josée Bélanger	May 14, 1986 (aged 28)	(Canadian Soccer Association) Laval Comets
10	MF	Ashley Lawrence	June 11, 1995 (aged 19)	(United States Soccer Federation) West Virginia Mountaineers
11	MF	Desiree Scott	July 31, 1987 (aged 27)	(The Football Association) Notts County
12	FW	Christine Sinclair	June 12, 1983 (aged 31)	(United States Soccer Federation) Portland Thorns
13	MF	Sophie Schmidt	June 28, 1988 (aged 26)	Unattached
14	FW	Melissa Tancredi	December 27, 1981 (aged 33)	(United States Soccer Federation) Chicago Red Stars
15	DF	Allysha Chapman	January 25, 1989 (aged 26)	(United States Soccer Federation) Houston Dash
16	MF	Jonelle Filigno	September 24, 1990 (aged 24)	(United States Soccer Federation) Sky Blue
17	MF	Jessie Fleming	March 11, 1998 (aged 16)	(Canadian Soccer Association) London NorWest
18	MF	Selenia Iacchelli	June 5, 1986 (aged 28)	Unattached
19	FW	Adriana Leon	October 2, 1992 (aged 22)	(United States Soccer Federation) Chicago Red Stars
20	DF	Marie-Ève Nault	February 16, 1982 (aged 33)	(Swedish Football Association) Örebro
21	GK	Stephanie Labbé	October 10, 1986 (aged 28)	(Swedish Football Association) Örebro
23	GK	Karina LeBlanc	March 30, 1980 (aged 34)	(United States Soccer Federation) Chicago Red Stars
24	DF	Quinn (Note: Then known as Rebecca Quinn)	August 11, 1995 (aged 19)	(United States Soccer Federation) Duke Blue Devils
25	FW	Janine Beckie	August 20, 1994 (aged 20)	(United States Soccer Federation) Texas Tech Red Raiders
26	FW	Christina Julien	May 6, 1988 (aged 26)	(German Football Association) USV Jena

=== Italy ===
Coach: Antonio Cabrini

The squad was announced on 23 February 2015.

No.	Pos.	Player	Date of birth (age)	Club
	GK	Laura Giuliani	5 June 1993 (aged 21)	(German Football Association) Herforder SV
	GK	Katja Schroffenegger	28 April 1991 (aged 23)	(German Football Association) Bayern Munich
	GK	Sabrina Tasselli	3 April 1990 (aged 24)	(Italian Football Federation) Riviera di Romagna
	DF	Elisa Bartoli	7 May 1991 (aged 23)	(Italian Football Federation) Torres
	DF	Federica Di Criscio	12 May 1993 (aged 21)	(Italian Football Federation) Verona
	DF	Sara Gama	27 March 1989 (aged 25)	(French Football Federation) Paris Saint-Germain
	DF	Elena Linari	15 April 1994 (aged 20)	(Italian Football Federation) Brescia
	DF	Raffaella Manieri	26 November 1986 (aged 28)	(German Football Association) Bayern Munich
	DF	Linda Tucceri Cimini	4 April 1991 (aged 23)	(Italian Football Federation) Riviera di Romagna
	MF	Barbara Bonansea	13 June 1991 (aged 23)	(Italian Football Federation) Brescia
	MF	Tatiana Bonetti	15 December 1991 (aged 23)	(Italian Football Federation) Verona
	MF	Marta Carissimi	3 May 1987 (aged 27)	(Italian Football Federation) Verona
	MF	Valentina Cernoia	22 June 1991 (aged 23)	(Italian Football Federation) Brescia
	MF	Chiara Eusebio	4 July 1995 (aged 19)	(Italian Football Federation) Riviera di Romagna
	MF	Alia Guagni	1 October 1987 (aged 27)	(Italian Football Federation) Firenze
	MF	Martina Rosucci	9 May 1992 (aged 22)	(Italian Football Federation) Brescia
	MF	Daniela Stracchi	2 September 1983 (aged 31)	(Italian Football Federation) Mozzanica
	FW	Melania Gabbiadini	28 August 1983 (aged 31)	(Italian Football Federation) Verona
	FW	Valentina Giacinti	2 January 1994 (aged 21)	(Italian Football Federation) Mozzanica
	FW	Cristiana Girelli	23 April 1990 (aged 24)	(Italian Football Federation) Brescia
	FW	Ilaria Mauro	22 May 1988 (aged 26)	(German Football Association) SC Sand
	FW	Daniela Sabatino	26 June 1985 (aged 29)	(Italian Football Federation) Brescia
	FW	Stefania Tarenzi	29 February 1988 (aged 27)	(Italian Football Federation) Brescia

=== Scotland ===
Coach: (Sweden) Anna Signeul

The squad was announced on 19 February 2015.

No.	Pos.	Player	Date of birth (age)	Club
	GK	Megan Cunningham	14 July 1995 (aged 19)	(Scottish Football Association) Glasgow City
	GK	Gemma Fay	9 December 1981 (aged 33)	(Scottish Football Association) Celtic
	GK	Shannon Lynn	22 October 1985 (aged 29)	(Swedish Football Association) Vittsjö
	DF	Jen Beattie	13 May 1991 (aged 23)	(The Football Association) Manchester City
	DF	Frankie Brown	8 October 1987 (aged 27)	(The Football Association) Bristol Academy
	DF	Rachel Corsie	17 August 1989 (aged 25)	(United States Soccer Federation) Seattle Reign
	DF	Ifeoma Dieke	25 February 1981 (aged 34)	(Swedish Football Association) Vittsjö
	DF	Eilish McSorley	24 April 1993 (aged 21)	(Swedish Football Association) Mallbacken
	DF	Emma Mitchell	19 September 1992 (aged 22)	(The Football Association) Arsenal
	DF	Kirsty Smith	6 January 1994 (aged 21)	(Scottish Football Association) Hibernian
	MF	Lana Clelland	26 January 1993 (aged 22)	(Italian Football Federation) Pink Bari
	MF	Leanne Crichton	6 August 1987 (aged 27)	(The Football Association) Notts County
	MF	Kim Little	19 June 1990 (aged 24)	(United States Soccer Federation) Seattle Reign
	MF	Joanne Love	6 December 1985 (aged 29)	(Scottish Football Association) Glasgow City
	MF	Christie Murray	3 May 1990 (aged 24)	(The Football Association) Bristol Academy
	MF	Leanne Ross	8 July 1981 (aged 33)	(Scottish Football Association) Glasgow City
	MF	Caroline Weir	20 June 1995 (aged 19)	(The Football Association) Arsenal
	FW	Fiona Brown	31 March 1995 (aged 19)	(Scottish Football Association) Glasgow City
	FW	Hayley Lauder	4 June 1990 (aged 24)	(Scottish Football Association) Glasgow City
	FW	Jane Ross	18 September 1989 (aged 25)	(Swedish Football Association) Vittsjö

=== South Korea ===
Coach: Yoon Deok-yeo

The squad was announced on 16 February 2015.

No.	Pos.	Player	Date of birth (age)	Club
1	GK	Yoon Young-geul	28 October 1987 (aged 27)	(Korea Football Association) Suwon UDC
2	DF	Seo Hyun-sook	6 January 1992 (aged 23)	Unattached
3	DF	Song Su-ran	7 September 1990 (aged 24)	(Korea Football Association) Gumi Sportstoto
4	DF	Shim Seo-yeon	15 April 1989 (aged 25)	Unattached
5	DF	Kim Do-yeon	7 December 1988 (aged 26)	(Korea Football Association) Incheon Hyundai Steel Red Angels
6	DF	Lim Seon-joo	27 November 1990 (aged 24)	(Korea Football Association) Incheon Hyundai Steel Red Angels
7	MF	Jeon Ga-eul	14 September 1988 (aged 26)	(Korea Football Association) Incheon Hyundai Steel Red Angels
8	MF	Cho So-hyun	24 June 1988 (aged 26)	(Korea Football Association) Incheon Hyundai Steel Red Angels
9	FW	Park Eun-sun	25 December 1986 (aged 28)	(Russian Football Union) Rossiyanka
10	FW	Ji So-yun	21 February 1991 (aged 24)	(The Football Association) Chelsea
11	FW	Jung Seol-bin	6 January 1990 (aged 25)	(Korea Football Association) Incheon Hyundai Steel Red Angels
12	FW	Yoo Young-a	15 April 1988 (aged 26)	(Korea Football Association) Incheon Hyundai Steel Red Angels
13	MF	Kwon Hah-nul	7 March 1988 (aged 26)	(Korea Football Association) Boeun Sangmu
14	MF	Park Hee-young	21 March 1991 (aged 23)	(Korea Football Association) Gumi Sportstoto
15	FW	Yeo Min-ji	27 April 1993 (aged 21)	(Korea Football Association) Gumi Sportstoto
16	MF	Lee Young-ju	22 April 1992 (aged 22)	(Korea Football Association) Boeun Sangmu
17	DF	Shin Dam-yeong	2 October 1993 (aged 21)	(Korea Football Association) Suwon UDC
18	GK	Kim Jung-mi	16 October 1984 (aged 30)	(Korea Football Association) Incheon Hyundai Steel Red Angels
19	MF	Lee Jeong-eun	15 February 1993 (aged 22)	(Korea Football Association) Boeun Sangmu
20	DF	Kim Hye-ri	25 June 1990 (aged 24)	(Korea Football Association) Incheon Hyundai Steel Red Angels
22	MF	Lee So-dam	12 October 1994 (aged 20)	(Korea Football Association) Gumi Sportstoto
23	DF	Kim Hye-yeong	26 February 1995 (aged 20)	Unattached

== Group B ==
=== Australia ===
Coach: Alen Stajcic

The squad was announced on 24 February 2015.

No.	Pos.	Player	Date of birth (age)	Caps	Goals	Club
1	GK	Brianna Davey	13 January 1995 (aged 20)	15	0	(Football Australia) Melbourne Victory
3	DF	Alanna Kennedy	21 January 1995 (aged 20)	22	0	(Football Australia) Perth Glory
4	DF	Clare Polkinghorne (captain)	1 February 1989 (aged 26)	75	4	(Football Australia) Brisbane Roar
5	DF	Laura Alleway	28 November 1989 (aged 25)	26	0	(Football Australia) Brisbane Roar
6	MF	Servet Uzunlar	8 March 1989 (aged 25)	40	2	(Football Australia) Sydney FC
7	DF	Steph Catley	26 January 1994 (aged 21)	26	1	(Football Australia) Melbourne Victory
8	MF	Elise Kellond-Knight	10 August 1990 (aged 24)	49	1	(Football Australia) Brisbane Roar
9	FW	Caitlin Foord	11 November 1994 (aged 20)	24	3	(Football Australia) Perth Glory
10	MF	Emily van Egmond	12 July 1993 (aged 21)	33	8	(Football Australia) Newcastle Jets
11	FW	Lisa De Vanna	14 November 1984 (aged 30)	92	32	(Football Australia) Melbourne Victory
12	FW	Kate Gill	10 December 1984 (aged 30)	83	40	(Football Australia) Perth Glory
14	MF	Collette McCallum	26 March 1986 (aged 28)	78	11	(Football Australia) Perth Glory
15	MF	Teresa Polias	16 May 1990 (aged 24)	4	0	(Football Australia) Sydney FC
16	FW	Hayley Raso	5 September 1994 (aged 20)	8	1	(Football Australia) Brisbane Roar
17	FW	Kyah Simon	25 June 1991 (aged 23)	43	10	(Football Australia) Sydney FC
19	MF	Katrina Gorry	13 August 1992 (aged 22)	24	8	(Football Australia) Brisbane Roar
21	GK	Mackenzie Arnold	25 February 1994 (aged 21)	2	0	(Football Australia) Perth Glory
22	MF	Nicola Bolger	3 March 1993 (aged 22)	3	0	(Football Australia) Sydney FC
23	FW	Michelle Heyman	4 July 1988 (aged 26)	27	10	(Football Australia) Canberra United
24	FW	Ashleigh Sykes	15 December 1991 (aged 23)	7	2	(Football Australia) Canberra United
26	FW	Larissa Crummer	10 January 1996 (aged 19)	1	0	(Football Australia) Brisbane Roar
27	DF	Gema Simon	19 July 1990 (aged 24)	1	0	(Football Australia) Melbourne Victory

=== England ===
Coach: (Wales) Mark Sampson

The squad was announced on 20 February 2015. On 3 March 2015, Toni Duggan was added to the squad.

No.	Pos.	Player	Date of birth (age)	Club
1	GK	Karen Bardsley	14 October 1984 (aged 30)	(The Football Association) Manchester City
2	DF	Alex Scott	14 October 1984 (aged 30)	(The Football Association) Arsenal
3	DF	Demi Stokes	12 December 1991 (aged 23)	(The Football Association) Manchester City
4	MF	Jo Potter	13 November 1984 (aged 30)	(The Football Association) Birmingham City
5	DF	Steph Houghton	23 April 1988 (aged 26)	(The Football Association) Manchester City
6	DF	Laura Bassett	2 August 1983 (aged 31)	(The Football Association) Chelsea
7	MF	Jordan Nobbs	8 December 1992 (aged 22)	(The Football Association) Arsenal
8	MF	Jill Scott	2 February 1987 (aged 28)	(The Football Association) Manchester City
9	FW	Jodie Taylor	17 May 1986 (aged 28)	(United States Soccer Federation) Portland Thorns
10	FW	Fran Kirby	29 June 1993 (aged 21)	(The Football Association) Reading
11	MF	Karen Carney	1 August 1987 (aged 27)	(The Football Association) Birmingham City
12	DF	Gemma Bonner	13 July 1991 (aged 23)	(The Football Association) Liverpool
13	GK	Siobhan Chamberlain	15 August 1983 (aged 31)	(The Football Association) Arsenal
14	DF	Alex Greenwood	7 September 1993 (aged 21)	(The Football Association) Notts County
15	DF	Casey Stoney	13 May 1982 (aged 32)	(The Football Association) Arsenal
16	MF	Fara Williams (captain)	25 January 1984 (aged 31)	(The Football Association) Liverpool
17	MF	Katie Chapman	15 June 1982 (aged 32)	(The Football Association) Chelsea
18	MF	Jade Moore	22 October 1990 (aged 24)	(The Football Association) Birmingham City
19	FW	Jessica Clarke	5 May 1989 (aged 25)	(The Football Association) Notts County
20	FW	Eniola Aluko	21 February 1987 (aged 28)	(The Football Association) Chelsea
21	GK	Carly Telford	7 July 1987 (aged 27)	(The Football Association) Notts County
22	FW	Lianne Sanderson	3 February 1988 (aged 27)	(The Football Association) Arsenal
23	DF	Claire Rafferty	11 January 1989 (aged 26)	(The Football Association) Chelsea
24	FW	Toni Duggan	25 July 1991 (aged 23)	(The Football Association) Manchester City

=== Finland ===
Coach: (Sweden) Andrée Jeglertz

The squad was announced on 17 February 2015.

No.	Pos.	Player	Date of birth (age)	Club
1	GK	Minna Meriluoto	4 October 1985 (aged 29)	(Football Association of Finland) HJK
2	DF	Maija Saari (captain)	26 March 1986 (aged 28)	(Swedish Football Association) AIK
3	DF	Tuija Hyyrynen	10 March 1988 (aged 26)	(Swedish Football Association) Umeå
4	MF	Ria Öling	15 September 1994 (aged 20)	(Football Association of Finland) TPS
5	MF	Emma Koivisto	25 September 1994 (aged 20)	(United States Soccer Federation) Florida State Seminoles
6	MF	Riikka Ketoja	10 September 1994 (aged 20)	(Swedish Football Association) Sunnanå
7	MF	Annika Kukkonen	12 April 1990 (aged 24)	(Swedish Football Association) Sunnanå
8	MF	Katri Nokso-Koivisto	22 November 1982 (aged 32)	(Football Association of Finland) Ilves
9	FW	Juliette Kemppi	14 May 1994 (aged 20)	(Swedish Football Association) AIK
10	MF	Emmi Alanen	30 April 1991 (aged 23)	(Swedish Football Association) Umeå
11	MF	Nora Heroum	20 July 1994 (aged 20)	(Danish Football Association) Fortuna Hjørring
12	GK	Vera Varis	20 January 1994 (aged 21)	(Football Association of Finland) Honka
13	FW	Sanni Franssi	19 March 1995 (aged 19)	(Football Association of Finland) PK-35
14	MF	Julia Tunturi	25 April 1996 (aged 18)	(Football Association of Finland) Åland United
15	MF	Natalia Kuikka	1 December 1995 (aged 19)	(Football Association of Finland) Merilappi United
16	DF	Anna Westerlund	9 April 1989 (aged 25)	(Norwegian Football Federation) Lillestrøm
17	FW	Sanna Saarinen	4 September 1991 (aged 23)	(Football Association of Finland) PK-35
18	FW	Linda Sällström	13 July 1988 (aged 26)	(Swedish Football Association) Vittsjö
19	FW	Adelina Engman	11 October 1994 (aged 20)	(Swedish Football Association) Kopparbergs/Göteborg
20	FW	Linda Ruutu	17 February 1990 (aged 25)	(Football Association of Finland) PK-35
21	DF	Katarina Naumanen	24 July 1995 (aged 19)	(Football Association of Finland) Pallokissat
23	GK	Tinja-Riikka Korpela	5 May 1986 (aged 28)	(German Football Association) Bayern Munich

=== Netherlands ===
Coach: Roger Reijners

The squad was announced on 25 February 2015.

No.	Pos.	Player	Date of birth (age)	Club
1	GK	Loes Geurts	12 January 1986 (aged 29)	(Swedish Football Association) Kopparbergs/Göteborg
2	MF	Desiree van Lunteren	30 December 1992 (aged 22)	(Royal Dutch Football Association) Ajax
3	DF	Stefanie van der Gragt	16 August 1992 (aged 22)	(Royal Dutch Football Association) Telstar
4	DF	Mandy van den Berg	26 August 1990 (aged 24)	(Norwegian Football Federation) Lillestrøm
5	DF	Siri Worm	20 April 1992 (aged 22)	(Royal Dutch Football Association) Twente
6	MF	Anouk Dekker	15 November 1986 (aged 28)	(Royal Dutch Football Association) Twente
7	FW	Manon Melis	31 August 1986 (aged 28)	(Swedish Football Association) Kopparbergs/Göteborg
8	MF	Sherida Spitse	29 May 1990 (aged 24)	(Norwegian Football Federation) Lillestrøm
9	FW	Dyanne Bito	10 August 1981 (aged 33)	(Royal Dutch Football Association) Telstar
10	MF	Daniëlle van de Donk	5 August 1991 (aged 23)	(Royal Dutch Football Association) PSV
11	MF	Lieke Martens	16 December 1992 (aged 22)	(Swedish Football Association) Kopparbergs/Göteborg
12	MF	Anouk Hoogendijk	6 May 1985 (aged 29)	(Royal Dutch Football Association) Ajax
17	MF	Tessel Middag	23 December 1992 (aged 22)	(Royal Dutch Football Association) Ajax
19	MF	Jill Roord	22 April 1997 (aged 17)	(Royal Dutch Football Association) Twente
20	FW	Vivianne Miedema	15 July 1996 (aged 18)	(German Football Association) Bayern Munich
21	DF	Claudia van den Heiligenberg	25 March 1985 (aged 29)	(Royal Dutch Football Association) Ajax
23	GK	Angela Christ	6 March 1989 (aged 25)	(Royal Dutch Football Association) PSV
24	MF	Vanity Lewerissa	1 April 1991 (aged 23)	(Royal Belgian Football Association) Standard Liège
	GK	Sari van Veenendaal	3 April 1990 (aged 24)	(Royal Dutch Football Association) Twente
	GK	Renate Verhoeven	28 June 1995 (aged 19)	(Royal Belgian Football Association) Standard Liège
	DF	Merel van Dongen	11 February 1993 (aged 22)	(Royal Dutch Football Association) Ajax
	DF	Petra Hogewoning	26 March 1986 (aged 28)	(Royal Dutch Football Association) Ajax
	DF	Dominique Janssen	17 January 1995 (aged 20)	(German Football Association) SGS Essen
	MF	Eshly Bakker	10 February 1993 (aged 22)	(Royal Dutch Football Association) Ajax
	MF	Kim Mourmans	1 April 1995 (aged 19)	(Royal Belgian Football Association) Standard Liège
	FW	Kirsten van de Ven	11 May 1985 (aged 29)	(Swedish Football Association) Rosengård

== Group C ==
=== Belgium ===
Coach: Ives Serneels

No.	Pos.	Player	Date of birth (age)	Club
1	GK	Justien Odeurs	30 May 1997 (aged 17)	(Royal Belgian Football Association) Lierse
2	DF	Davina Philtjens	26 February 1989 (aged 26)	(Royal Belgian Football Association) Standard Liège
3	DF	Heleen Jaques	20 April 1988 (aged 26)	(Royal Belgian Football Association) Club Brugge
4	DF	Maud Coutereels	21 May 1986 (aged 28)	(Royal Belgian Football Association) Standard Liège
5	DF	Lorca Van De Putte	3 April 1988 (aged 26)	(Swedish Football Association) Kristianstad
6	DF	Tine De Caigny	9 June 1997 (aged 17)	(Royal Belgian Football Association) Club Brugge
7	FW	Yana Daniëls	8 May 1992 (aged 22)	(Royal Dutch Football Association) Twente
8	MF	Cécile De Gernier	25 May 1986 (aged 28)	(Royal Belgian Football Association) Standard Liège
9	FW	Tessa Wullaert	19 March 1993 (aged 21)	(Royal Belgian Football Association) Standard Liège
10	FW	Aline Zeler	2 June 1983 (aged 31)	(Royal Belgian Football Association) Standard Liège
11	MF	Janice Cayman	12 October 1988 (aged 26)	(French Football Federation) Juvisy
12	GK	Nicky Evrard	26 May 1995 (aged 19)	(Royal Belgian Football Association) Gent
13	MF	Nicky Van Den Abbeele	21 February 1994 (aged 21)	(Royal Belgian Football Association) Club Brugge
14	DF	Elien Van Wynendaele	19 February 1995 (aged 20)	(Royal Belgian Football Association) Gent
15	MF	Sara Yuceil	22 June 1988 (aged 26)	(Royal Belgian Football Association) Standard Liège
16	DF	Jody Vangheluwe	15 July 1997 (aged 17)	(Royal Belgian Football Association) Club Brugge
17	MF	Niki De Cock	30 December 1985 (aged 29)	(Royal Belgian Football Association) Lierse
18	FW	Justine Vanhaevermaet	29 April 1992 (aged 22)	(Royal Belgian Football Association) Lierse
19	DF	Imke Courtois	14 March 1988 (aged 26)	(Royal Belgian Football Association) Standard Liège
20	MF	Julie Biesmans	4 May 1994 (aged 20)	(Royal Belgian Football Association) Standard Liège
22	FW	Riana Nainggolan	3 May 1988 (aged 26)	(Italian Football Federation) Res Roma
23	MF	Elke Van Gorp	15 May 1995 (aged 19)	(Royal Belgian Football Association) Lierse

=== Czech Republic ===
Coach: Stanislav Krejčík

No.	Pos.	Player	Date of birth (age)	Club
1	GK	Radka Bednaříková	18 December 1990 (aged 24)	(Football Association of the Czech Republic) Slovácko
2	DF	Adéla Odehnalová	2 January 1990 (aged 25)	(Football Association of the Czech Republic) Sparta Prague
3	MF	Jitka Chlastáková	13 October 1993 (aged 21)	(Football Association of the Czech Republic) Slavia Prague
4	MF	Pavla Benýrová	29 September 1989 (aged 25)	(Football Association of the Czech Republic) Slavia Prague
5	DF	Alžběta Blažková	21 May 1994 (aged 20)	(Football Association of the Czech Republic) Sparta Prague
6	MF	Eva Bartoňová	17 October 1993 (aged 21)	(Football Association of the Czech Republic) Sparta Prague
7	FW	Lucie Martínková (captain)	19 September 1986 (aged 28)	(Football Association of the Czech Republic) Sparta Prague
8	DF	Jana Sedláčková	21 January 1993 (aged 22)	(German Football Association) 1. FC Lübars
9	FW	Lucie Voňková	28 February 1992 (aged 23)	(German Football Association) MSV Duisburg
10	FW	Petra Divišová	5 June 1984 (aged 30)	(Football Association of the Czech Republic) Slavia Prague
11	DF	Simona Necidová	20 January 1994 (aged 21)	(Football Association of the Czech Republic) Slavia Prague
12	MF	Klára Cahynová	20 December 1993 (aged 21)	(Football Association of the Czech Republic) Slavia Prague
13	FW	Tereza Kožárová	18 October 1991 (aged 23)	(Football Association of the Czech Republic) Slavia Prague
14	DF	Petra Vyštejnová	12 November 1990 (aged 24)	(Football Association of the Czech Republic) Sparta Prague
15	MF	Monika Cvernová	30 July 1990 (aged 24)	(Football Association of the Czech Republic) Slovácko
16	GK	Hana Sloupová	25 November 1991 (aged 23)	(Football Association of the Czech Republic) Sparta Prague
17	MF	Irena Martínková	19 September 1986 (aged 28)	(Football Association of the Czech Republic) Sparta Prague
18	MF	Aneta Malinová	14 June 1993 (aged 21)	(Football Association of the Czech Republic) Slavia Prague
19	FW	Gabriela Matoušková	9 August 1992 (aged 22)	(Football Association of the Czech Republic) Sparta Prague
23	GK	Alexandra Vaníčková	15 June 1997 (aged 17)	(Football Association of the Czech Republic) Sparta Prague

=== Mexico ===
Coach: Leonardo Cuéllar

No.	Pos.	Player	Date of birth (age)	Club
1	GK	Cecilia Santiago	19 October 1994 (aged 20)	(United States Soccer Federation) Kansas City
2	DF	Arianna Romero	29 July 1992 (aged 22)	(United States Soccer Federation) Washington Spirit
3	DF	Bianca Sierra	25 June 1992 (aged 22)	(United States Soccer Federation) Boston Breakers
4	DF	Christina Murillo	28 January 1993 (aged 22)	(United States Soccer Federation) Michigan Wolverines
5	DF	Valeria Miranda	18 August 1992 (aged 22)	(Mexican Football Federation) UNAM
6	DF	Mónica Alvarado	11 January 1991 (aged 24)	(United States Soccer Federation) TCU Horned Frogs
7	MF	Nayeli Rangel (captain)	28 February 1992 (aged 23)	Unattached
8	MF	Yamile Franco	7 July 1992 (aged 22)	Unattached
9	FW	Charlyn Corral	11 September 1991 (aged 23)	(Football Association of Finland) Merilappi United
10	FW	Stephany Mayor	23 September 1991 (aged 23)	(Mexican Football Federation) UDLA Puebla
11	FW	Mónica Ocampo	4 January 1987 (aged 28)	(United States Soccer Federation) Sky Blue
12	GK	Anjulí Ladrón de Guevara	7 October 1986 (aged 28)	Unattached
13	DF	Kenti Robles	15 February 1991 (aged 24)	(Royal Spanish Football Federation) Espanyol
14	DF	Greta Espinoza	5 June 1995 (aged 19)	(United States Soccer Federation) Oregon State Beavers
15	MF	Carolina Jaramillo	19 March 1994 (aged 20)	Unattached
16	DF	Jennifer Ruiz	9 August 1983 (aged 31)	Unattached
17	MF	Verónica Pérez	18 May 1988 (aged 26)	(United States Soccer Federation) Washington Spirit
18	DF	Paulina Solís	13 March 1996 (aged 18)	Unattached
19	MF	Teresa Noyola	15 April 1990 (aged 24)	(United States Soccer Federation) Houston Dash
20	FW	Ariana Calderón	12 May 1990 (aged 24)	Unattached
21	MF	Amanda Pérez	31 July 1994 (aged 20)	(United States Soccer Federation) Washington Huskies
22	DF	Alina Garciamendez	16 April 1991 (aged 23)	Unattached

=== South Africa ===
Coach: (Netherlands) Vera Pauw

The squad was announced on 25 February 2015.

No.	Pos.	Player	Date of birth (age)	Club
1	GK	Roxanne Barker	6 May 1991 (aged 23)	(Football Association of Iceland) Þór/KA
2	DF	Lebogang Ramalepe	3 December 1991 (aged 23)	(South African Football Association) Ma-Indies
3	DF	Nothando Vilakazi	28 October 1988 (aged 26)	(South African Football Association) Palace Super Falcons
4	DF	Noko Matlou	30 September 1985 (aged 29)	(South African Football Association) Ma-Indies
5	DF	Janine van Wyk	17 April 1987 (aged 27)	(South African Football Association) JVW
6	MF	Mamello Makhabane	24 February 1988 (aged 27)	(South African Football Association) Palace Super Falcons
7	MF	Kelso Peskin	23 July 1995 (aged 19)	(United States Soccer Federation) Tyler Junior College
8	MF	Alochia Thobokela	18 September 1989 (aged 25)	(South African Football Association) Mamelodi Sundowns
9	MF	Amanda Dlamini	22 July 1988 (aged 26)	(South African Football Association) University of Johannesburg
10	MF	Silindile Ngubane	25 March 1987 (aged 27)	(South African Football Association) Durban
11	FW	Jermaine Seoposenwe	12 October 1993 (aged 21)	(United States Soccer Federation) Samford Bulldogs
12	FW	Portia Modise	20 June 1983 (aged 31)	(South African Football Association) Croesus
13	DF	Tshepiso Mokabane	28 September 1989 (aged 25)	(Slovak Football Association) Nové Zámky
14	FW	Sanah Mollo	30 January 1987 (aged 28)	(South African Football Association) Mamelodi Sundowns
15	MF	Refiloe Jane	4 August 1992 (aged 22)	(South African Football Association) Vaal University of Technology
16	GK	Andile Dlamini	2 September 1992 (aged 22)	(South African Football Association) Mamelodi Sundowns
17	MF	Leandra Smeda	22 July 1989 (aged 25)	(South African Football Association) University of the Western Cape
18	MF	Mpumi Nyandeni	19 August 1987 (aged 27)	(South African Football Association) JVW
19	FW	Rhoda Mulaudzi	2 December 1989 (aged 25)	(South African Football Association) Mamelodi Sundowns
20	FW	Shiwe Nogwanya	7 March 1994 (aged 20)	(South African Football Association) Bloemfontein Celtic
21	FW	Disebo Mametja		(South African Football Association) University of Johannesburg
22	DF	Lerato Kgasago	21 September 1991 (aged 23)	(South African Football Association) Mamelodi Sundowns
23	GK	Ntshetsana Mputle	7 November 1990 (aged 24)	(South African Football Association) Titans

== Player representation ==
Statistics are per the beginning of the competition.

=== By club ===
Clubs with 5 or more players represented are listed.

Players	Club
11	(Belgium) Standard Liège
9	(Czech Republic) Sparta Prague
8	(South Korea) Incheon Hyundai Steel Red Angels
7	(Czech Republic) Slavia Prague, (England) Arsenal, (Italy) Brescia, (Netherlands) Ajax
6	(Australia) Brisbane Roar, (England) Manchester City
5	(Australia) Perth Glory, (England) Chelsea, (England) Notts County, (Netherlands) Twente, (Scotland) Glasgow City, (South Africa) Mamelodi Sundowns

=== By club nationality ===
Players	Clubs
31	England
29	United States
22	Australia
21	Belgium
20	Italy, Sweden
19	South Africa
18	Czech Republic
17	South Korea
16	Netherlands
11	Finland
10	Germany
7	Scotland
3	Norway
2	Canada, France, Mexico
1	Denmark, Iceland, Russia, Slovakia, Spain

=== By club federation ===
Players	Federation
164	UEFA
39	AFC
33	CONCACAF
19	CAF

=== By representatives of domestic league ===
National squad	Players
England	23
Australia	22
South Africa	19
Belgium	18
Czech Republic	18
Italy	18
South Korea	17
Netherlands	15
Finland	10
Scotland	7
Canada	2
Mexico	2
