= 2014 Naisten Liiga =

Naisten Liiga
- Season: 2014
- Champions: PK-35 Vantaa
- Relegated: ONS
- Top goalscorer: Sanna Saarinen (20 goals)
- Highest attendance: 1,593; Åland U 1–2 PK-35 (18 October)

The 2014 Naisten Liiga, part of the 2014 Finnish football season, was the 8th season of Naisten Liiga since its establishment in 2007. The season started on 22 March 2014 and ended on 18 October 2014. Åland United were the defending champions, having won their 2nd Finnish championship in 2013.

The season featured 10 teams. After 18 matches played, the league was divided to Championship Group of six and Relegation Group of four. The Champion, PK-35 Vantaa, qualified for the first qualifying round of the 2015–16 UEFA Women's Champions League and ONS was relegated to the Naisten Ykkönen for the 2015 season. FC Ilves was promoted.

== Teams ==
Merilappi United was promoted in 2013 for their first season in the Finnish women's premier division.

Team	Location	Stadium	Manager
FC Honka	Espoo	Tapiolan Urheilupuisto	(Finland) Timo Lounio
HJK	Helsinki	Töölön Pallokenttä	(Finland) Maria Virolainen
Kokkola Futis 10	Kokkola	Kokkolan Keskuskenttä	(Finland) Risto Willman (Finland) Hannu Ketoja (since 15 June)
Merilappi United	Kemi	City Sport Areena	(Finland) Jukka-Pekka Poutiainen
NiceFutis	Pori	Pori Stadium	(Finland) Kari Latvanen
ONS	Oulu	Castrén Stadium	(Finland) Mauri Holappa
Pallokissat	Kuopio	Savon Sanomat Areena	(Finland) Ollipekka Ojala
PK-35	Vantaa	ISS Stadion	(Finland) Jari Väisänen
TPS	Turku	Turun yläkenttä	(Finland) Sami Haltia
Åland United	Lemland	Bengtsböle IP	(England) Gary Williams

== Preliminary stage ==
Pos	Team	Pld	W	D	L	GF	GA	GD	Pts	Qualification
1	Åland United	18	13	4	1	56	21	+35	43	Championship group
2	PK-35	18	13	3	2	58	18	+40	42	Championship group
3	FC Honka	18	10	4	4	45	21	+24	34	Championship group
4	Pallokissat	18	8	5	5	29	28	+1	29	Championship group
5	Merilappi United	18	7	4	7	36	27	+9	25	Championship group
6	TPS	18	6	2	10	32	50	−18	20	Championship group
7	Kokkola F10	18	5	3	10	31	48	−17	18	Relegation group
8	NiceFutis	18	5	3	10	31	56	−25	18	Relegation group
9	HJK	18	4	3	11	21	37	−16	15	Relegation group
10	ONS	18	3	1	14	16	49	−33	10	Relegation group

== Championship group ==
- Note: Matches and points of Preliminary stage are counted

Pos	Team	Pld	W	D	L	GF	GA	GD	Pts	Qualification
1	PK-35	23	17	3	3	75	27	+48	54	2015–16 UEFA Women's Champions League Qualifying round
2	Åland United	23	16	4	3	69	29	+40	52	
3	Pallokissat	23	12	5	6	36	30	+6	41	
4	FC Honka	23	11	4	8	59	34	+25	37	
5	TPS	23	8	3	12	45	64	−19	27	
6	Merilappi United	23	7	5	11	38	47	−9	26	

== Relegation group ==
- Note: Matches and points of Preliminary stage are counted

Pos	Team	Pld	W	D	L	GF	GA	GD	Pts	Relegation
1	NiceFutis	24	9	4	11	53	68	−15	31	
2	HJK	24	8	4	12	41	44	−3	28	
3	Kokkola F10	24	6	3	15	37	69	−32	21	
4	ONS (R)	24	5	1	18	30	71	−41	16	Relegation to Naisten Ykkönen

(R) Relegated

== Top scorers ==
Pos.	Player	Club	Goals
1.	(Finland) Sanna Saarinen	PK-35	20
2.	(Finland) Sanni Franssi	PK-35	19
3.	(United States) Brooke Barbuto	NiceFutis	17
3.	(Finland) Adelina Engman	Åland United	17
5.	(Finland) Ria Öling	TPS	16
6.	(Finland) Juliette Kemppi	Åland United	14
7.	(Estonia) Signy Aarna	Pallokissat	13
8.	(Finland) Riikka Hannula	FC Honka	12
8.	(Finland) Natalia Kuikka	Merilappi United	12
8.	(Nigeria) Cynthia Uwak	Åland United	12

== Personal awards ==
- Top scorer: Sanna Saarinen, PK-35
- Player of the year: Ria Öling, TPS
- Young player of the year: Katriina Naumanen, Pallokissat
- Referee of the year: Kirsi Heikkinen

== Sources ==
- 2014 Naisten Liiga Finnish Football Association
