= 2015 Naisten Liiga =

Naisten Liiga
- Season: 2015
- Champions: PK-35 (5th title)
- Relegated: Merilappi United
- Champions League: PK-35
- Matches: 117
- Goals: 475 (4.06 per match)
- Top goalscorer: Heidi Kollanen (24 goals)
- Biggest home win: Pallokissat 8–0 VIFK
- Biggest away win: NiceFutis 1–8 Ilves; HJK 0–7 PK-35
- Highest scoring: Merilappi United 2–8 TPS
- All statistics correct as of 19 October 2015.

The 2015 Naisten Liiga, part of the 2015 Finnish football season, was the 9th season of Naisten Liiga since its establishment in 2007. The season started on 18 April 2015 and ended on 10 October 2015. Tikkurilan Palloseura was promoted.

The season featured 10 teams. After 18 matches played, the league was divided to Championship Group of six and Relegation Group of four. PK-35 Vantaa were the 2014 season champions and successfully defended their title and qualified for the first qualifying round of the 2016–17 UEFA Women's Champions League. Merilappi United was relegated to the Naisten Ykkönen for the 2016 season.

== Teams ==
Team	Location	Stadium	Manager
FC Honka	Espoo	Tapiolan Urheilupuisto	(Finland) Luciano Posillipo
HJK	Helsinki	Töölön Pallokenttä	(Finland) Pasi Pihamaa
Ilves	Tampere	Tammela Stadion	(Finland) Rami Rosenberg
Merilappi United	Kemi	City Sport Areena	(Finland) Jukka-Pekka Poutiainen
NiceFutis	Pori	Pori Stadium	(Finland) Heimo Piira
Pallokissat	Kuopio	Savon Sanomat Areena	(Finland) Ollipekka Ojala
PK-35	Vantaa	ISS Stadion	(Finland) Jari Väisänen
TPS	Turku	Turun yläkenttä	(Finland) Sami Haltia
VIFK	Vaasa	Hietalahti Stadium	(Finland) Keijo Karvonen
Åland United	Lemland	Bengtsböle IP	(England) Gary Williams

== Format ==
Teams played each other twice, after that the top six teams formed a championship group and the bottom four a relegation group. At the championship group teams played each other once more while at the relegation group, teams played each other twice.

== Regular season ==
The regular season had a total of 18 matches per club.

=== League table ===
Pos	Team	Pld	W	D	L	GF	GA	GD	Pts	Qualification
1	PK-35	18	15	3	0	63	11	+52	48	Championship group
2	Ilves	18	10	4	4	56	28	+28	34	Championship group
3	Pallokissat	18	10	2	6	44	26	+18	32	Championship group
4	Åland United	18	9	5	4	37	26	+11	32	Championship group
5	FC Honka	18	10	1	7	47	29	+18	31	Championship group
6	HJK	18	10	1	7	24	27	−3	31	Championship group
7	TPS	18	7	2	9	30	30	0	23	Relegation group
8	Merilappi United	18	3	3	12	27	51	−24	12	Relegation group
9	VIFK	18	2	2	14	26	77	−51	8	Relegation group
10	NiceFutis	18	2	1	15	20	69	−49	7	Relegation group

=== Results ===
Home \ Away	ÅLA	HJK	HON	ILV	MER	NIC	PAL	PK3	TPS	VFK
Åland United		0–1	2–1	2–2	3–3	3–2	2–4	0–3	2–0	5–4
HJK	0–1		2–1	2–2	2–1	2–1	0–3	0–7	3–0	2–0
FC Honka	0–3	2–0		3–2	3–0	7–1	5–2	1–1	2–4	8–1
Ilves	1–1	2–1	0–2		3–1	5–2	2–1	0–3	1–1	8–1
Merilappi United	1–4	1–2	3–4	0–5		2–2	0–4	1–4	1–0	1–1
NiceFutis	0–3	0–1	0–5	1–8	0–3		1–0	0–5	1–4	6–3
Pallokissat	2–2	0–2	3–0	1–3	2–1	3–0		1–1	2–1	8–0
PK-35	0–0	4–0	3–1	3–2	6–1	5–2	2–1		3–0	7–0
TPS	2–0	2–0	1–0	2–3	3–5	4–0	1–3	1–2		2–2
VIFK	0–4	0–4	1–2	1–7	3–2	6–1	3–4	0–4	0–2	

Updated to match(es) played on 29 August 2015. Source: Soccerway
Legend: Blue = home team win; Yellow = draw; Red = away team win.

== Final stage ==
Points and goals of the final stage are just added to the regular season.

=== Championship Group ===
Pos	Team	Pld	W	D	L	GF	GA	GD	Pts	Qualification or relegation	PK3	ILV	ÅLA	PAL	HON	HJK
1	PK-35 (C)	23	17	5	1	72	19	+53	56	Qualification to Champions League		2–2			2–3	2–1
2	Ilves	23	13	5	5	67	35	+32	44				1–2	3–2	1–0	
3	Åland United	23	12	6	5	46	33	+13	42		1–2					2–1
4	Pallokissat	23	12	4	7	54	34	+20	40		1–1		3–3		2–1	
5	FC Honka	23	11	1	11	51	36	+15	34				0–1			0–1
6	HJK	23	11	1	11	28	37	−9	34			1–4		0–2		

Updated to match(es) played on 10 October 2015. Source: Soccerway / Soccerway
Legend: Blue = home team win; Yellow = draw; Red = away team win.
Rules for classification: 1) Points; 2) Goal difference; 3) Number of goals scored
(C) Champions

=== Relegation Group ===
Pos	Team	Pld	W	D	L	GF	GA	GD	Pts	Qualification or relegation	TPS	NIC	VFK	MER
1	TPS	24	10	3	11	47	44	+3	33			1–1	1–4	3–1
2	NiceFutis	24	5	3	16	33	74	−41	18		4–0		4–1	3–0
3	VIFK	24	5	3	16	42	90	−48	18		2–4	1–1		5–3
4	Merilappi United (R)	24	4	3	17	35	73	−38	15	Relegation to Naisten Ykkönen	2–8	2–0	0–3	

Updated to match(es) played on 10 October 2015. Source: Soccerway / Soccerway
Legend: Blue = home team win; Yellow = draw; Red = away team win.
Rules for classification: 1) Points; 2) Goal difference; 3) Number of goals scored
(R) Relegated

== Top scorers ==
As of matches played on 10 October 2015.

Pos.	Player	Club	Goals
1	(Finland) Heidi Kollanen	Ilves	24
2	(Nigeria) Cynthia Uwak	Åland United	23
3	(Finland) Ria Öling	TPS	18
4	(Estonia) Signy Aarna	Pallokissat	17
5	(Finland) Riikka Hannula	FC Honka	14
5	(Finland) Emma Heikkilä	Merilappi United	14
7	(Finland) Iina Salmi	PK-35	13
8	(Finland) Sanna Saarinen	PK-35	11
9	(Finland) Kaisa Collin	HJK	10
9	(Finland) Eva-Susanna Dahlmars	VIFK	10
9	(Cyprus) Krystyna Freda	Merilappi United	10
9	(Finland) Ella-Rosa Huusko	Pallokissat	10
9	(Finland) Heidi Pihlaja	PK-35	10
