= 2020 Kansallinen Liiga =

Kansallinen Liiga
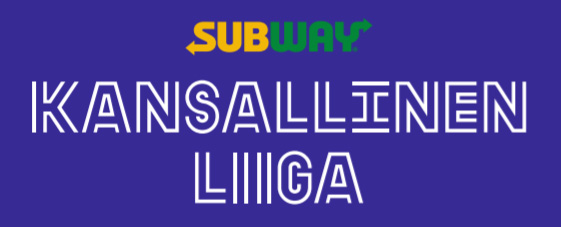
- Season: 2020
- Champions: Åland United
- Promoted: PK-35 Vantaa; PK-35 Helsinki
- Relegated: TPS
- Champions League: Åland United
- Matches: 90
- Goals: 264 (2.93 per match)
- Top goalscorer: Gentjana Rochi (16 goals)
- Biggest home win: KuPS 6–0 TPS (13 June 2020)
- Biggest away win: TPS 0–6 KuPS (22 August 2020)
- Highest scoring: JyPK 4–4 PK-35 Vantaa (22 August 2020) JyPK 2–6 Åland United (27 June 2020)
- All statistics correct as of 8 November 2020.

The 2020 Kansallinen Liiga was the 14th season of the Naisten Liiga, the top flight women's division of the Finnish football league system and the 1st season of the Kansallinen Liiga after its change of name. Åland United were the champions after 18 rounds of matches.

== Teams ==
The season featured 10 teams.PK-35 Vantaa were promoted from the 2019 Naisten Ykkönen as league winners while PK-35 (women) were promoted after defeating IK Myran at the 2019 playoff. IK Myran and ONS were relegated from the previous season.

Club	Location	Home ground	Head coach
FC Honka	Espoo	Tapiolan Urheilupuisto	(Finland) Rosa Lappi-Seppälä
Helsingin Jalkapalloklubi (HJK)	Helsinki	Telia 5G Arena	(Finland) Jonne Kunnas
Ilves	Tampere	Tammela Stadion	(Finland) Mika Lahtinen
Jyväskylän Pallokerho (JyPK)	Jyväskylä	Harjun Stadion	(Finland) Tuomas Jaakkola
Kuopion Palloseura (KuPS)	Kuopio	Savon Sanomat Areena	(Finland) Ollipekka Ojala
PK-35 Helsinki (PK-35)	Helsinki	MagneCit Arena	(Finland) Rami Rantanen
PK-35 Vantaa	Vantaa	Myyrmäen jalkapallostadion	(Finland) Jari Väisänen
Tikkurilan Palloseura (TiPS)	Vantaa	Tikkurilan urheilupuisto	(Finland) Pauliina Miettinen
Turun Palloseura (TPS)	Turku	Turun urheilupuisto	(Finland) Sami Haltia
Åland United	Lemland	Wiklöf Holding Arena	(Finland) Samuel Fagerholm

Source: Suomen Palloliitto (Finnish Football Association)

== Format ==
The 10 teams played each other twice. At the end of the season, the ninth placed team played the Ykkönen second placed team in a Promotion/relegation play-off. The winner of the league also earns the right to play in the 2021–22 UEFA Women's Champions League.

== Regular season ==
Pos	Team	Pld	W	D	L	GF	GA	GD	Pts	Qualification
1	Åland United (C)	18	14	1	3	35	10	+25	43	Qualification for the Champions League first round
2	TiPS	18	12	5	1	31	13	+18	41	
3	KuPS	18	10	3	5	44	21	+23	33	
4	HJK	18	10	3	5	26	18	+8	33	
5	FC Honka	18	9	3	6	35	26	+9	30	
6	PK-35 Helsinki	18	6	3	9	16	24	−8	21	
7	PK-35 Vantaa	18	5	3	10	21	36	−15	18	
8	Ilves	18	5	1	12	23	29	−6	16	
9	JyPK (O)	18	5	1	12	24	45	−21	16	Promotion/relegation play-offs
10	TPS (R)	18	2	1	15	9	42	−33	7	Relegation to Ykkönen

Source: Soccerway
Rules for classification: 1) Points; 2) Goal difference; 3) Number of goals scored; 4) Head-to-head points; 5) Head-to-head goal difference; 6) Head-to-head away goals scored
(C) Champions; (O) Play-off winners; (R) Relegated

== Results ==
Home \ Away	ÅLA	TiPS	KPS	HJK	PKH	HON	PK3	ILV	JyPK	TPS
Åland United		0–0	3–0	2–1	3–1	2–1	2–0	0–1	3–0	1–0
TiPS	0–3		2–1	3–0	1–1	3–1	6–1	2–1	1–0	1–0
Kuopion Palloseura	0–1	1–1		2–1	4–1	1–3	3–0	3–1	4–1	6–0
HJK	1–0	0–0	4–2		1–1	1–0	4–2	1–0	3–0	3–1
PK-35 Helsinki	0–2	0–1	0–0	0–2		0–4	1–2	0–1	1–3	4–0
FC Honka	1–3	2–2	2–2	2–0	0–1		2–1	1–1	2–1	0–1
PK-35 Vantaa	1–0	0–2	0–2	0–0	0–2	1–3		1–0	3–0	3–0
Ilves	1–3	0–1	1–3	1–2	0–1	2–3	4–1		3–1	2–4
JyPK	2–6	2–4	0–4	2–0	0–1	3–4	4–4	2–1		2–1
TPS	0–1	0–1	0–6	0–2	0–1	1–4	1–1	0–3	0–1	

Source: Soccerway
Legend: Blue = home team win; Yellow = draw; Red = away team win.

== Promotion/relegation play-offs ==
The ninth placed team, JyPK engaged the Ykkönen runners-up, VIFK in a two-legged play-off to decide if they will remain in the league.

=== First leg ===
21 November 2020
14:00

VIFK	0–6	JyPK
	Report	Miettinen 15' (pen.); Lilja 30', 87' (pen.); Tiainen 37' (pen.); Voutilainen 73', 77'

Hietalahti Stadium, Vaasa
Referee: Lina Lehtovaara

=== Second leg ===
28 November 2020
14:00

JyPK	1–1	VIFK
Salminen 31'	Report	Forss 34'

Vehkahalli, Jyväskylä
Referee: Sini Hakala

JyPK won 7–1 on aggregate and remained in the league.

== Top scorers ==
As of matches played on 8 November 2020.

Rank	Player	Club	Goals
1	(North Macedonia) Gentjana Rochi	KuPS	16
2	(Finland) Aino Kröger	KuPS	12
3	(Finland) Amanda Rantanen	PK-35 Helsinki	10
4	(Finland) Henna Honkanen	JyPK	8
5	(Finland) Wilma Forsblom	PK-35 Vantaa	7
5	(South Africa) Ode Fulutudilu	Åland United	7
5	(Finland) Nora Lehto	TiPS	7
5	(Finland) Dana Leskinen	FC Honka	7
9	(Nigeria) Roosa Ariyo	TiPS	6
9	(Albania) Lavdie Begolli	KuPS	6
