= Joanna Tynnilä =

Finnish footballer (born 2001)

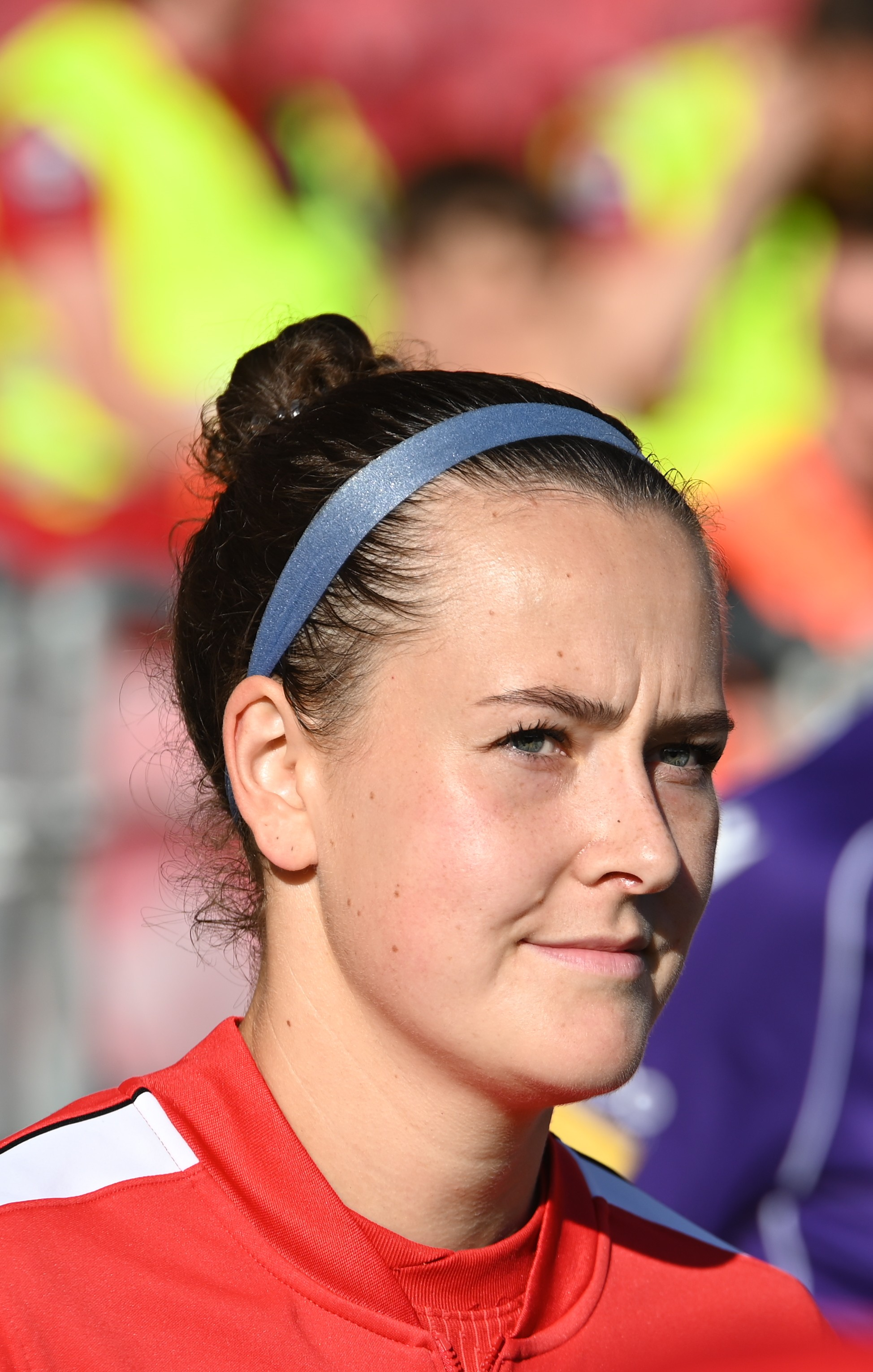
- Joanna Tynnilä with Brann in 2026.

Personal information
- Full name: Joanna Maria Tynnilä
- Date of birth: 1 September 2001 (age 25)
- Height: 1.70 m (5 ft 7 in)
- Position: Centre back

Team information
- Current team: Brann
- Number: 30

Youth career
- –2017: TiPS

Senior career*
Years	Team	Apps	(Gls)
2017–2021	TiPS	106	(8)
2022–2023	HJK	36	(1)
2023–	Brann	46	(0)

International career^{‡}
2018	Finland U17	1	(0)
2019	Finland U18	2	(0)
2019	Finland U19	1	(0)
2021–2022	Finland U23	4	(0)
2023–	Finland	31	(0)
- * Club domestic league appearances and goals as of 3 July 2025 ‡ National team caps and goals as of 15 October 2026

Joanna Maria Tynnilä (born 1 September 2001) is a Finnish professional footballer who plays as a centre back for Norwegian Toppserien club Brann and the Finland national team.

== Club career ==
Tynnilä played in the youth sector of Tikkurilan Palloseura (TiPS) in Vantaa, before debuting in the club's first team in the second tier Naisten Ykkönen in 2017.

In 2022, she joined Kansallinen Liiga club HJK Helsinki and spent two seasons with the team.

In August 2023, Tynnilä was acquired by Norwegian SK Brann for an undisclosed fee. With Brann, she played in the 2023–24 UEFA Champions League, helping her side to advance through group stage to top eight, as the first Norwegian women's club ever.

== International career ==
Tynnilä represented Finland U17 at the 2018 FIFA U-17 Women's World Cup in Uruguay.

She made her full international debut for the Finland national team on 16 February 2023, in a 2023 Cyprus Women's Cup match against Croatia. Eventually, Finland were crowned the champions of Cyprus Women's Cup friendly tournament.

On 19 June 2025, Tynnilä was called up to the Finland squad for the UEFA Women's Euro 2025.

== Career statistics ==
=== Club ===
As of 3 July 2025

Appearances and goals by club, season and competition
Club	Season	League			Cup (Note: Includes Finnish Women's Cup and Norwegian Women's Cup)		Europe		Other		Total	
Club	Season	Division	Apps	Goals	Apps	Goals	Apps	Goals	Apps	Goals	Apps	Goals
TiPS	2017	Naisten Ykkönen	22	1	–		–		–		22	1
TiPS	2018	Naisten Liiga	23	0	–		–		–		23	0
TiPS	2019	Naisten Liiga	20	2	1	0	–		–		21	2
TiPS	2020	Kansallinen Liiga	18	2	4	1	–		–		22	3
TiPS	2021	Kansallinen Liiga	23	3	2	0	–		–		25	3
TiPS	Total		106	8	7	1	0	0	0	0	113	9
HJK	2022	Kansallinen Liiga	21	0	6	0	–		–		27	0
HJK	2023	Kansallinen Liiga	15	1	1	0	–		5 (Note: Includes Kansallinen Cup)	1	21	2
HJK	Total		36	1	7	0	0	0	5	1	48	2
Brann	2023	Toppserien	9	0	1	0	12 (Note: Includes UEFA Women's Champions League)	0	–		22	0
Brann	2024	Toppserien	24	0	2	0	–		–		26	0
Brann	2025	Toppserien	13	0	2	0	–		–		15	0
Brann	Total		46	0	5	0	12	0	0	0	63	0
Career total			188	9	19	1	12	0	5	1	224	11

=== International ===
As of 10 July 2025

Appearances and goals by national team and year
National team	Year	Apps	Goals
Finland	2023	4	0
Finland	2024	11	0
Finland	2025	9	0
Total		24	0

== Honours ==
TiPS

- Kansallinen Liiga runner-up: 2020, 2021
- Finnish Women's Cup runner-up: 2019–20
- Naisten Ykkönen: 2017

HJK

- Kansallinen Liiga runner-up: 2022
- Finnish Women's Cup runner-up: 2021–22

Finland

- Cyprus Women's Cup: 2023
- Pinatar Cup: 2024
