= Emmi Siren =

Finnish footballer (born 2001)

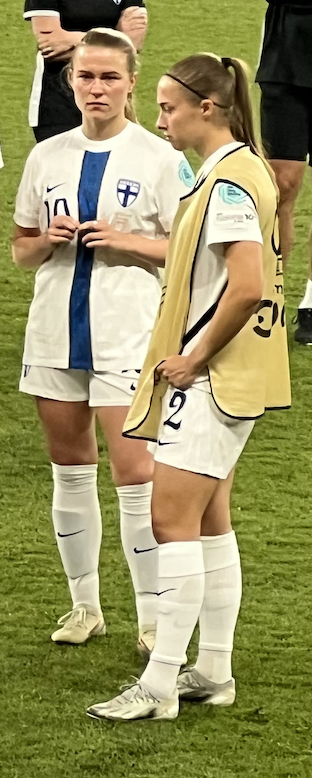
- Emmi Siren (left) with Finland in 2025.

Personal information
- Full name: Emmi Sofia Siren
- Date of birth: 23 February 2001 (age 25)
- Place of birth: Finland
- Height: 1.64 m (5 ft 5 in)
- Positions: Defender; midfielder

Team information
- Current team: RC Strasbourg

Youth career
- –2017: TiPS

Senior career*
Years	Team	Apps	(Gls)
2017–2021	TiPS	108	(15)
2022–2023	KuPS	37	(10)
2024–2025	Nordsjælland	31	(1)
2025–2026	Dijon	3	(0)

International career^{‡}
2018	Finland U17	1	(0)
2019	Finland U18	2	(0)
2019	Finland U19	2	(0)
2021–2023	Finland U23	6	(0)
2023–	Finland	7	(0)
Medal record
Finland
First place	Cyprus Women's Cup	2023
- * Club domestic league appearances and goals as of 3 October 2025 ‡ National team caps and goals as of 3 July 2025

Emmi Sofia Siren (born 23 February 2001) is a Finnish professional footballer who plays as a defender for Première Ligue club RC Strasbourg and for the Finland national team.

== Club career ==
Siren started her senior career with Tikkurilan Palloseura. For the 2022 season, she joined Kuopion Palloseura, where they won two Finnish championship titles.

During the 2024–25 season, Siren played for Nordsjælland in Danish Women's League.

In August 2025, she joined Dijon in French Première Ligue.

== International career ==
Siren represented Finland U17 at the 2018 FIFA U-17 Women's World Cup in Uruguay.

On 19 June 2025, Siren was called up to the Finland squad for the UEFA Women's Euro 2025.

== Personal life ==
Her twin sister Oona is also a Finnish international footballer.

== Career statistics ==
As of 2 July 2025

Appearances and goals by national team and year
National team	Year	Apps	Goals
Finland	2023	2	0
Finland	2024	3	0
Finland	2025	2	0
Total		7	0

== Honours ==
Nordsjælland

- Danish Women's League: 2023–24
- Danish Women's Cup: 2023–24

KuPS

- Kansallinen Liiga: 2022, 2023
- Finnish Women's Cup: 2023
- Kansallinen Cup runner-up: 2023

TiPS

- Kansallinen Liiga runner-up: 2020, 2021
- Naisten Ykkönen: 2017
- Finnish Women's Cup runner-up: 2020

Finland

- Cyprus Women's Cup: 2023
