= Oona Siren =

Finnish footballer (born 2001)

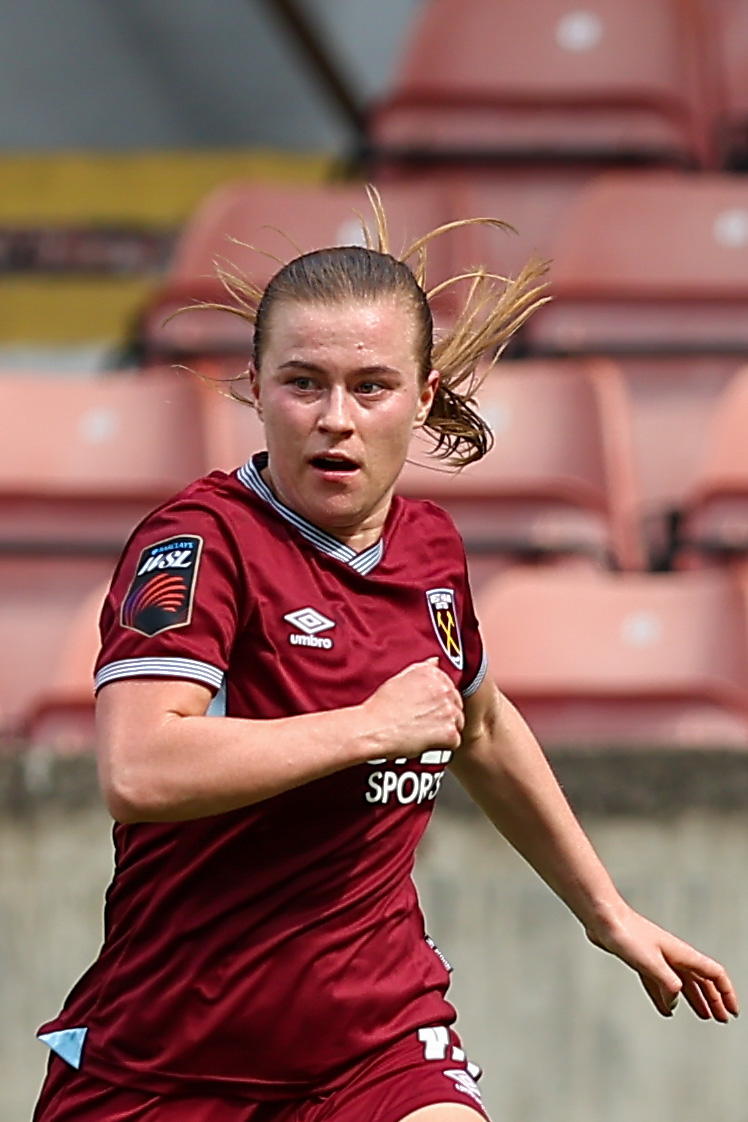
- Siren playing for West Ham United in 2025

Personal information
- Full name: Oona Amanda Siren
- Date of birth: 23 February 2001 (age 25)
- Place of birth: Finland
- Height: 1.60 m (5 ft 3 in)
- Position: Midfielder

Team information
- Current team: West Ham United
- Number: 4

Youth career
- –2017: TiPS

Senior career*
Years	Team	Apps	(Gls)
2017–2021	TiPS	108	(18)
2022–2023	KuPS	46	(8)
2024	LSK Kvinner	19	(0)
2024–	West Ham United	44	(1)

International career^{‡}
2018	Finland U17	1	(1)
2019	Finland U18	2	(0)
2019	Finland U19	2	(1)
2021–2023	Finland U23	7	(0)
2023–	Finland	38	(1)
Medal record
Finland
Winner	Pinatar Cup	2024
- * Club domestic league appearances and goals as of 15:40, 15 September 2026 (UTC) ‡ National team caps and goals as of 08:05, 15 October 2026 (UTC)

Oona Amanda Siren (Finnish: [ˈoːnɑ ˈɑmɑndɑ ˈsireːn]; born 23 February 2001) is a Finnish professional footballer who plays as a midfielder for Women's Super League club West Ham United and the Finland national team.

== Club career ==
Siren started football in Tikkurilan Palloseura (TiPS) in Vantaa. She made her senior debut in the second tier Naisten Ykkönen in 2017, and after the promotion to Kansallinen Liiga, she stayed with the club until the end of 2021.

During 2022–2023, she played with Kuopion Palloseura (KuPS), winning two Finnish championship titles, the Finnish Women's Cup in 2023, and represented the club in the UEFA Women's Champions League qualifiers.

In late December 2023, Siren signed with Norwegian Toppserien club LSK Kvinner.

On 12 September 2024, she joined Women's Super League club West Ham United. On 16 May 2026, Siren won the Hammer of the Year and Goal of the Season awards after her long range strike against London City Lionesses on 29 March 2026.

On 27 July 2026, Siren signed a new two-year contract with West Ham United

== International career ==
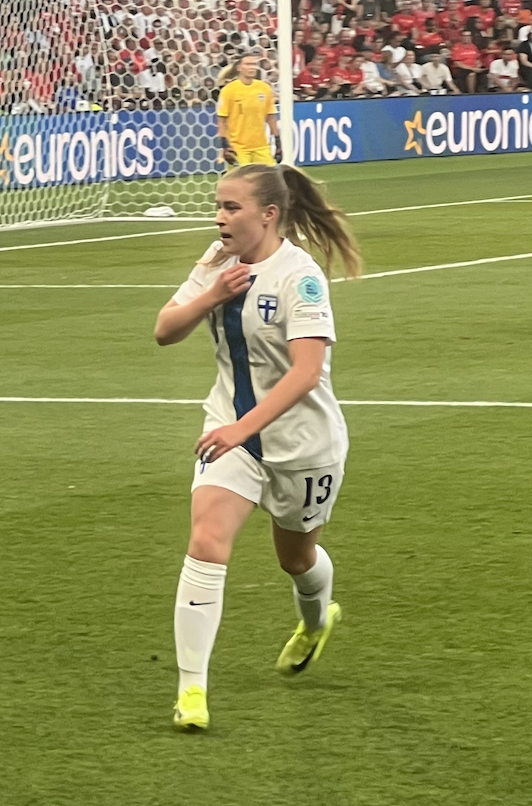
Siren with Finland at the UEFA Women's Euro 2025

Siren represented Finland U17 at the 2018 FIFA U-17 Women's World Cup in Uruguay.

She made her full national team debut for Finland, in a friendly win against Slovakia on 10 April 2023.

On 19 June 2025, Siren was called up to the Finland squad for the UEFA Women's Euro 2025.

== Personal life ==
Her twin sister Emmi is also a Finnish international footballer.

== Career statistics ==
=== Club ===
As of match played 12 September 2026

Appearances and goals by club, season and competition
Club	Season	League			National cup (Note: Includes Finnish Women's Cup, Norwegian Women's Cup and Women's FA Cup)		League cup (Note: Includes Kansallinen Cup and FA Women's League Cup)		Europe		Total	
Club	Season	Division	Apps	Goals	Apps	Goals	Apps	Goals	Apps	Goals	Apps	Goals
TiPS	2017	Naisten Ykkönen	20	3	—		—		—		20	3
TiPS	2018	Naisten Liiga	24	4	—		—		—		24	4
TiPS	2019	Naisten Liiga	23	1	3	0	—		—		26	1
TiPS	2020	Kansallinen Liiga	18	2	6	5	—		—		24	7
TiPS	2021	Kansallinen Liiga	23	8	2	0	—		—		25	8
TiPS	Total		108	18	11	5	0	0	0	0	119	23
KuPS	2022	Kansallinen Liiga	23	5	3	1	—		4 (Note: Appearances in UEFA Women's Champions League)	0	30	6
KuPS	2023	Kansallinen Liiga	23	3	4	1	7	1	2	0	36	5
KuPS	Total		46	8	7	2	7	1	6	0	66	11
LSK Kvinner	2024	Toppserien	19	0	1	0	—		—		20	0
West Ham United	2024–25	Women's Super League	20	0	1	0	5	0	—		26	0
West Ham United	2025–26	Women's Super League	22	1	2	0	4	0	—		28	1
West Ham United	2026–27	Women's Super League	2	0	0	0	0	0	—		2	0
West Ham United	Total		44	1	3	0	9	0	0	0	56	1
Career total			217	27	22	7	12	1	6	0	257	35

=== International ===
As of match played 13 October 2026

Appearances and goals by national team and year
National team	Year	Apps	Goals
Finland	2023	5	0
Finland	2024	13	0
Finland	2025	13	1
Finland	2026	7	0
Total		38	1

Scores and results list Finland's goal tally first, score column indicates score after each Siren goal.

List of international goals scored by Oona Siren
No.	Date	Venue	Opponent	Score	Result	Competition
1	26 June 2025	Kooi Stadion, Leeuwarden, Netherlands	Netherlands	1–2	1–2	Friendly

== Honours ==
KuPS

- Kansallinen Liiga: 2022, 2023
- Finnish Women's Cup: 2023
- Kansallinen Cup runner-up: 2023

TiPS

- Kansallinen Liiga runner-up: 2020, 2021
- Naisten Ykkönen: 2017
- Finnish Women's Cup runner-up: 2020

Finland

- Pinatar Cup: 2024
