= Natalia Kuikka =

Finnish footballer (born 1995)

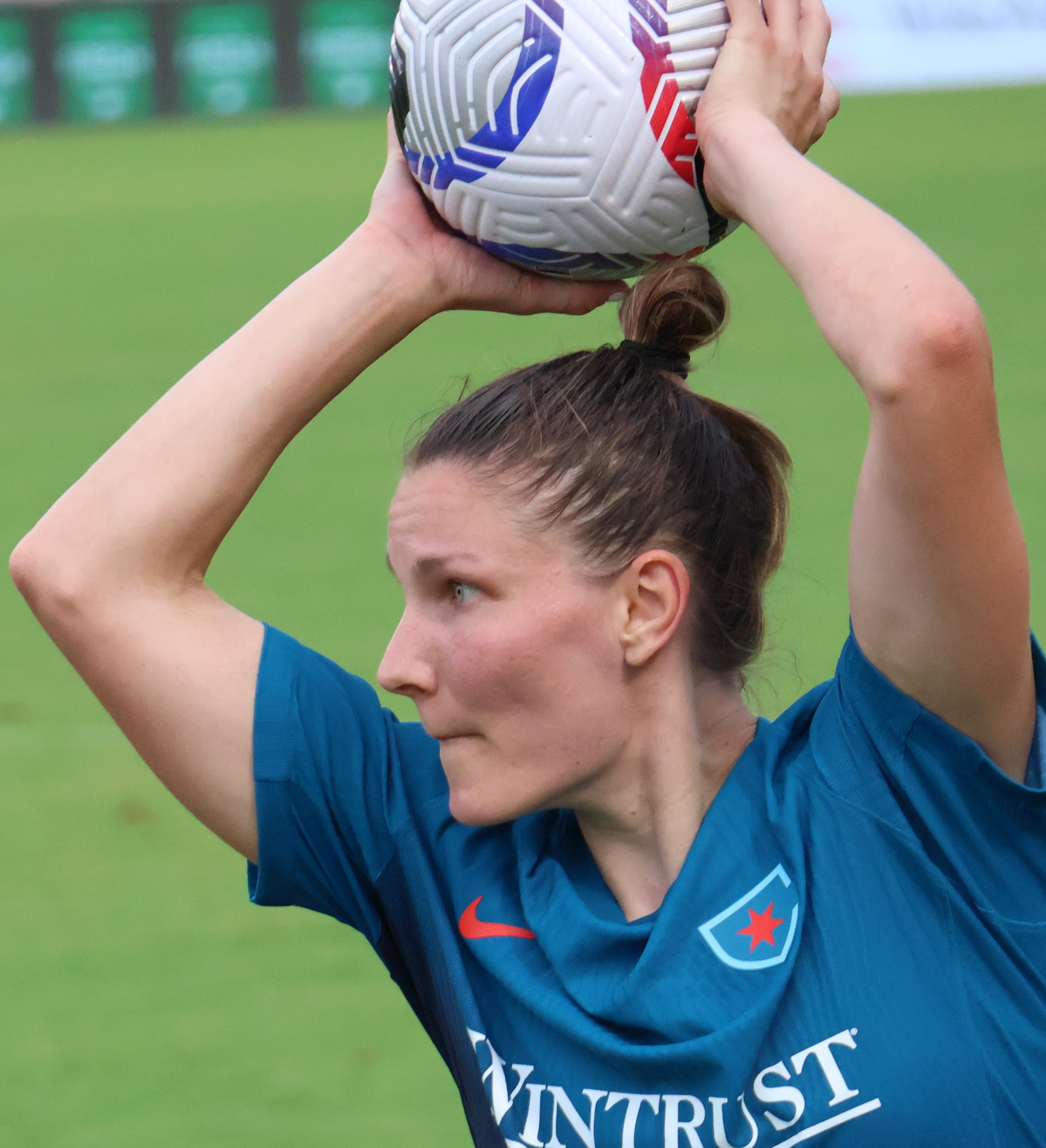
- Kuikka with the Chicago Red Stars in 2024

Personal information
- Full name: Natalia Kuikka
- Date of birth: 1 December 1995 (age 30)
- Place of birth: Kemi, Finland
- Height: 1.68 m (5 ft 6 in)
- Position: Defender

Team information
- Current team: Chicago Stars
- Number: 12

College career
Years	Team	Apps	(Gls)
2015–2018	Florida State Seminoles	79	(9)

Senior career*
Years	Team	Apps	(Gls)
2011	Visan Pallo	16	(14)
2012–2015	Merilappi United	63	(33)
2013	→ Kokkola F10 (loan)	11	(1)
2016	Seattle Sounders		
2017	Santa Clarita Blue Heat		
2019–2020	Kopparbergs/Göteborg FC	41	(5)
2021–2023	Portland Thorns	63	(2)
2024–	Chicago Stars	32	(0)

International career^{‡}
2011–2012	Finland U17	6	(2)
2012–2014	Finland U19	12	(3)
2014	Finland U20	3	(0)
2013–	Finland	102	(5)
- * Club domestic league appearances and goals as of 3 November 2025 ‡ National team caps and goals as of 10 July 2025

Natalia Kuikka (born 1 December 1995) is a Finnish professional footballer who plays as a defender for Chicago Stars FC of the National Women's Soccer League (NWSL) and the Finland national team. She was named the Finnish Footballer of the Year in 2022 by Finnish sports journalists. Early in her career, she played as a forward.

== College career ==
=== Florida State University ===
Kuikka was recruited by Mark Krikorian to join his Florida State University squad for the 2015 season. In her freshman year, she played in a total of 19 games, all as a midfielder, tallying 6 goals and 5 assists. She scored the first goal of her career versus New Mexico State University on 21 August 2015. In the ACC tournament, her goal and two assists earned her the first of her ACC Tournament MVP Awards.

Moving to the central defender role beginning her sophomore season, Kuikka helped solidify a defense that allowed a paltry 0.39 GAA. For the second year in a row, she won the ACC Tournament MVP award for her solid defensive play and two shootout penalty kick conversions.

After being selected as a team captain, success as the director of the defensive line continued in her junior year. The Seminoles had eight clean sheets including two in the NCAA Tournament.

As a senior and team captain, Kuikka anchored the Seminoles defense and led the team to a school-record 16 shutouts, including four in the NCAA Tournament. The final two being in the College Cup versus defending champion Stanford and in the final versus UNC to claim the NCAA Championship. Her efforts garnered her the 2018-9 Honda Sport Award for the top female athlete in NCAA Division I soccer.

Kuikka graduated in 2018 with a bachelor's degree in criminology.

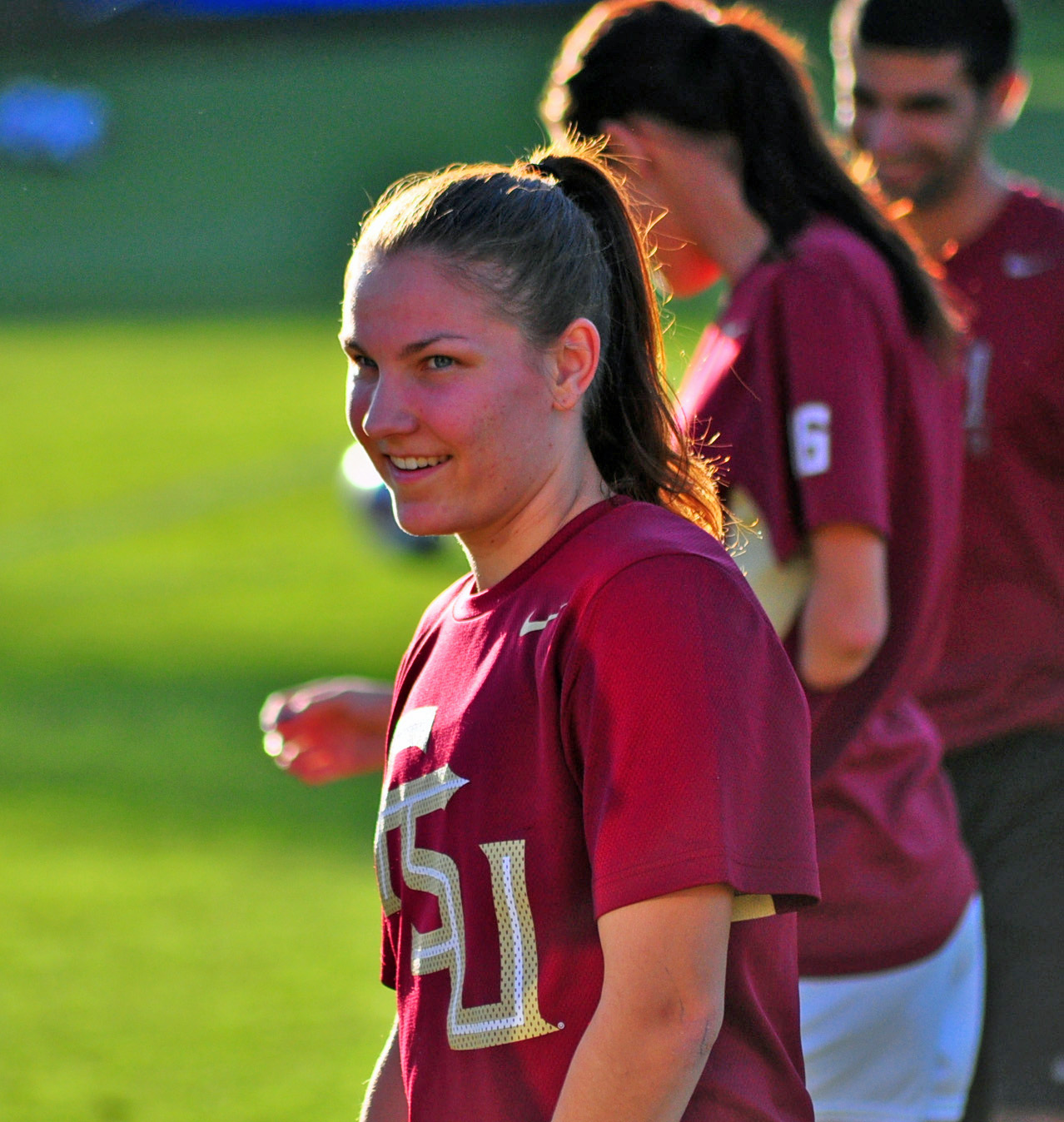
Kuikka with Florida State Seminoles in 2015

== Club career ==
=== Seattle Sounders Women ===
In the summer of 2016, Kuikka joined Seattle Sounders Women in the Women's Premier Soccer League. Alongside Florida State teammates Kaycie Tillman, Megan Connolly, and Cassie Miller, Kuikka helped the team go undefeated in the regular season to become WPSL NW Division Champions.

=== Santa Clarita Blue Heat ===
In the summer of 2017, Kuikka joined Santa Clarita Blue Heat in the United Women's Soccer league. She helped lead the defense to allow only 5 goals in 8 regular season games. She started in the UWS semi-final and final alongside Florida State teammate, Deyna Castellanos.

=== Kopparbergs/Göteborg FC ===
In January 2019, Kuikka signed with Kopparbergs/Göteborg FC in the Damallsvenskan in Sweden, joining her former Florida State University teammate and Finnish compatriot, Emma Koivisto.

=== Portland Thorns FC ===
On October 29, 2020, Portland Thorns FC announced that they signed Kuikka to a two-year deal, starting in 2021. On September 20, 2022, the club announced that they signed Kuikka to a one-year deal, extending her contract through the 2023 season. At the end of the 2022 season, Kuikka won the NWSL Championship title with Thorns.

=== Chicago Stars ===
On 18 January 2024, fellow NWSL side Chicago Red Stars (later named Chicago Stars FC) announced the signing of Kuikka on a three-year deal.

== International career ==
Having been capped for the Finnish U-16, U-17, U-18, U-19, and U-20 teams, Kuikka also played in the U-20 Women's World Cup in 2014.

Kuikka made her debut for the senior Finland National Team for the UEFA Women's Euro 2013. In 2017, 2020, 2021, and 2022, she earned the Finland National Player of the Year award.

On 19 June 2025, Kuikka was called up to the Finland squad for the UEFA Women's Euro 2025. On 2 July, Kuikka made her 100th international appearance for Finland, in the tournament's opening match against Iceland, helping Finland to win the game 1–0, thus marking their first win in the European final tournament in 16 years.

== Personal life ==
Kuikka's hometown is Kemi, Finland. She is the daughter of Heli Kuikka and Hannu Suhonen.

== Career statistics ==
=== Club ===
As of 1 March 2026

Appearances and goals by club, season and competition
Club	Season	League			National cup (Note: Includes Finnish Women's Cup, Svenska Cupen (women) and NWSL Challenge Cup)		Continental		Total	
Club	Season	Division	Apps	Goals	Apps	Goals	Apps	Goals	Apps	Goals
Visan Pallo	2011	Naisten Kakkonen	14	14	–		–		14	14
Merilappi United	2012	Naisten Ykkönen	20	10	1	1	–		21	11
Merilappi United	2013	Naisten Ykkönen	14	9	–		–		14	9
Merilappi United	2014	Naisten Liiga	23	12	–		–		23	12
Merilappi United	2015	Naisten Liiga	6	2	–		–		6	2
Merilappi United	Total		63	33	1	1	0	0	64	34
Kokkola F10 (loan)	2013	Naisten Liiga	11	1	1	0	–		12	1
Seattle Sounders	2016	WPSL			–		–			
Santa Clarita Blue Heat	2017	UWS			–		–			
Kopparbergs/Göteborg FC	2019	Damallsvenskan	19	0	5	1	2 (Note: Appearance(s) in UEFA Women's Champions League)	0	26	1
Kopparbergs/Göteborg FC	2020	Damallsvenskan	22	5	2	1	–		24	6
Kopparbergs/Göteborg FC	Total		41	5	7	2	2	0	50	7
Portland Thorns	2021	NWSL	20	0	5	0	2 (Note: Appearances in Women's International Champions Cup)	1	27	1
Portland Thorns	2022	NWSL	21	1	5	0	1	0	27	1
Portland Thorns	2023	NWSL	22	1	5	0	–		27	1
Portland Thorns	Total		63	2	15	0	3	1	81	3
Chicago Red Stars	2024	NWSL	26	0	0	0	0	0	26	0
Chicago Red Stars	2025	NWSL	7	0	0	0	0	0	7	0
Chicago Red Stars	Total		29	0	0	0	0	0	33	0
Career total			221	55	24	3	5	1	254	59

=== International goals ===
Scores and results list Finland's goal tally first, score column indicates score after each Kuikka goal.

List of international goals scored by Natalia Kuikka
No.	Date	Venue	Opponent	Score	Result	Competition
1.	27 October 2015	Sonera Stadium, Helsinki, Finland	Spain	1–1	1–2	UEFA Women's Euro 2017 qualifying
2.	3 June 2016	Tehtaan kenttä, Valkeakoski, Finland	Republic of Ireland	3–0	4–1	UEFA Women's Euro 2017 qualifying
3.	7 November 2019	Telia 5G -areena, Helsinki, Finland	Cyprus	3–0	4–0	UEFA Women's Euro 2022 qualifying
4.	3 December 2024	Bolt Arena, Helsinki, Finland	Scotland	1–0	2–0	UEFA Women's Euro 2025 qualifying play-offs
5.	10 July 2025	Stade de Genève, Geneva, Switzerland	Switzerland	1–0	1–1	UEFA Women's Euro 2025

== Honors ==
Florida State Seminoles

- NCAA Division I Women's Soccer Championship: 2018

Kopparbergs/Göteborg FC

- Svenska Cupen: 2019
- Damallsvenskan Best Back (2020)
- Damallsvenskan: 2020

Portland Thorns FC

- NWSL Community Shield: 2020
- NWSL Challenge Cup: 2021
- International Champions Cup: 2021
- NWSL Championship: 2022

Individual

- Finnish Footballer of the Year: 2022
- Finnish Female Footballer of the Year: 2017, 2020, 2021, 2022, 2023
- Honda Collegiate Women's Sport Award Winner for Soccer (2018–19)
- College Cup All-Tournament Team (2018)
- United Soccer Coaches All-American Third Team (2018)
- United Soccer Coaches All-Atlantic Region First Team (2018)
- All-ACC Second Team: 2016, 2018
- ACC All-Tournament Team: 2015, 2016, 2018
- ACC Defensive Player of the Week (October 23, 2018)
- United Soccer Coaches All-East Region Second Team (2017)
- All-ACC First Team (2017)
- NSCAA All-American Third Team (2016)
- NSCAA All-Southeast Region First Team (2016)
- ACC Tournament MVP: 2015, 2016
- ACC All-Freshman Team (2015)
- TopDrawerSoccer Freshman Best XI Second Team (2015)
- TopDrawerSoccer Team of the Week (11/10/15, 11/24/15)
