= Tia Hälinen =

Finnish footballer (born 1994)

Personal information
- Full name: Tia Jasmin Hälinen
- Date of birth: 18 February 1994 (age 32)
- Place of birth: Kirkkonummi, Finland
- Height: 1.70 m (5 ft 7 in)
- Position: Midfielder

Youth career
- KirkU
- AC Kirkkonummi
- HooGee
- VJS

Senior career*
Years	Team	Apps	(Gls)
2011–2012	PK-35	44	(11)
2013	Kokkola F10	22	(2)
2014–2015	FC Honka	40	(5)
2016–2017	HJK	28	(11)
2017	Santa Teresa CD		
2017–2018	Sparta Prague		
2018–2019	Eskilstuna United	17	(1)
2019–2020	HJK	6	(1)
2021	TiPS	19	(11)

International career^{‡}
2015–2021	Finland	11	(0)
- * Club domestic league appearances and goals as of 20:33, 22 September 2024 (UTC) ‡ National team caps and goals as of 11:37, 21 July 2019 (UTC)

Tia Jasmin Hälinen (born 18 February 1994) is a Finnish former footballer who played as a midfielder.

She previously played for PK-35, Kokkola F10, FC Honka and HJK of the Naisten Liiga. She also played in Spain for Santa Teresa CD, and in the Czech Republic for Sparta Prague.

== Club career ==
She left her home country in February 2017, signing for Spanish Primera División club Santa Teresa CD.

In July 2018 Hälinen agreed a transfer from Sparta Prague to Eskilstuna United DFF of the Swedish Damallsvenskan. She won the league with Sparta Prague.

On 12 August 2019, Hälinen was announced at HJK.

On 15 January 2021, Hälinen signed for TiPS. In her only season at TiPS, she managed 11 goals and 7 assists. At the end of the 2021 season, Hälinen retired to become a runner.

== Coaching career ==
On 13 September 2023, Hälinen was appointed the communications manager and junior manager of FC Kirkkonummi. She left the club on 15 March 2024.

On 14 February 2024, Hälinen was appointed assistant coach of NJS.

== International career ==
Hälinen was called up to the Finland national team in January 2015.

Hälinen made her debut for the Finland women's national team on 29 May 2015, in a 2–0 defeat by Norway in Drammen. She was a part of Finland's 2013 UEFA Women's Under-19 Championship team, which reached the semi-finals. She was also a member of the Finland squad at the 2014 FIFA U-20 Women's World Cup in Canada.

Hälinen was initially called up to the 2019 Cyprus Women's Cup, but was replaced by Heidi Kollanen due to injury.
