= Jonne Kunnas =

Finnish football manager (born 1992)

Personal information
- Full name: Jonne-Jussi Kunnas
- Date of birth: 4 May 1992 (age 34)
- Place of birth: Finland

Youth career
- Years: Team
- KoiPS
- TiPS

Managerial career
- 2020–2022: HJK women
- 2022–2024: Finland women (assistant)
- 2023–2024: Linköping (assistant)
- 2024–2025: Linköping

Jonne-Jussi Kunnas (born 4 May 1992) is a Finnish football coach and a former player.

== Career ==
As a player, Kunnas played in the youth sectors of Vantaa-based clubs Koivukylän Palloseura (KoIPS) and Tikkurilan Palloseura (TiPS).

He has worked as a youth talent coach for TiPS, Vantaan Jalkapalloseura (VJS) and HJK Helsinki. In TiPS, Kunnas was also a member of the board and the deputy chairman. Later he has also coached HJK girls' youth team and in the Finland women's youth national teams.

During 2020–2022, Kunnas served as the head coach of HJK women's team in top-tier Kansallinen Liiga, finishing 2nd in the league in 2022.

He reunited with head coach Marko Saloranta after joining the coaching staff of the Finland women's national football team in July 2022.

In December 2023, Kunnas started working as an assistant coach of Linköping in Swedish Damallsvenskan. On 1 October 2024, he was named the club's new first team head coach. He was sacked at the turn of July 2025.
