= Leigh Jakes =

American soccer player

Personal information
- Full name: Leigh Ashley Jakes
- Date of birth: March 24, 1988 (age 38)
- Place of birth: McDonough, Georgia, United States
- Height: 5 ft 7 in (1.70 m)
- Position: Defender

College career
Years	Team	Apps	(Gls)
2006–2010	Northwestern Wildcats		

Senior career*
Years	Team	Apps	(Gls)
2011	Chicago Red Stars	10	(0)
2011	Falköpings KIK	7	(0)
2013	Kokkola F10	19	(2)
2014	NiceFutis	5	(1)
2015	Chicago Red Stars	1	(0)
- * Club domestic league appearances and goals

Leigh Ashley Jakes (born March 24, 1988) is an American soccer player who played for NiceFutis in the Finnish women's premier division Naisten Liiga.

== Career ==
Jakes has previously played for Northwestern Wildcats in the Big Ten Conference, Chicago Red Stars in the Women's Premier Soccer League, Falköpings KIK in the Swedish second tier Elitettan and Kokkola F10 in the Finnish women's league.

== Family ==
Leigh Jakes is the daughter of Rhonda and Van Jakes who was a cornerback in the National Football League for six seasons.
