= Van Jakes =

American football player (born 1961)

No. 22, 24
- Position: Cornerback

Personal information
- Born: May 10, 1961 (age 65); Phenix City, Alabama, U.S.
- Listed height: 6 ft 0 in (1.83 m)
- Listed weight: 180 lb (82 kg)

Career information
- High school: Seneca Vocational(Buffalo, New York)
- College: Kent State
- NFL draft: 1983: undrafted

Career history
- Kansas City Chiefs (1983–1984); Jacksonville Bulls (1985); New Orleans Saints (1986–1988); Green Bay Packers (1989)

Career NFL statistics
- Interceptions: 9
- Fumble recoveries: 1
- Stats at Pro Football Reference

Van Keith Jakes (born May 10, 1961) is an American former professional football player who was a cornerback for six seasons for the Kansas City Chiefs, the New Orleans Saints, and the Green Bay Packers of the National Football League (NFL). He played college football for the Kent State Golden Flashes.

Van Jakes is the father of professional soccer player Leigh Jakes.
