= Julie Forss =

Finnish footballer (born 1998)

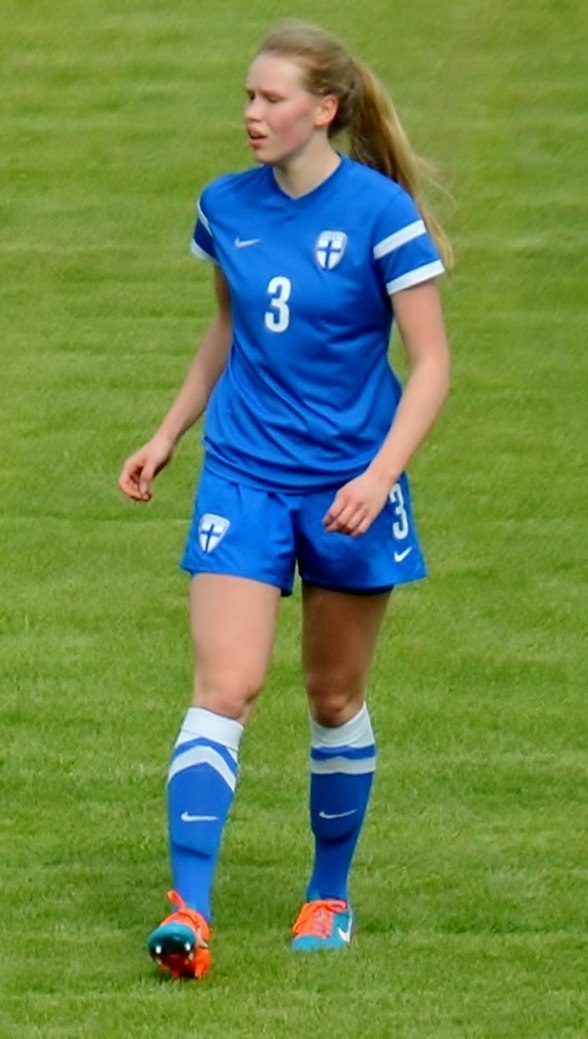
- Forss, 2015

Personal information
- Date of birth: 5 January 1998 (age 28)
- Place of birth: Finland
- Position: Defender

Team information
- Current team: PK-35
- Number: 2

Senior career*
Years	Team	Apps	(Gls)
2015–2020	Tampereen Ilves	73	(1)
2021-	PK-35	35	(1)

International career
2014-2015	Finland U17	6	(0)
- * Club domestic league appearances and goals

Julie Forss (born 5 January 1998) is a Finnish footballer. She played for Tampereen Ilves from 2015 to 2020. She moved to PK-35 in 2021. She played as a defender on the Finland women's national under-17 football team in 2015 and the Finland women's national under-20 football team in 2017.
