= Rami Rantanen =

Finnish footballer (born 1968)

Personal information
- Date of birth: 25 November 1968 (age 57)
- Place of birth: Helsinki, Finland
- Height: 1.79 m (5 ft 10 in)
- Position: Midfielder

Senior career*
Years	Team	Apps	(Gls)
1987–1988	HJK	24	(4)
1989–1990	Reipas Lahti	53	(6)
1991	Kuusysi	25	(2)
1992–1994	HJK	62	(4)
1995–1997	Trelleborg	60	(5)
1998	PK-35	25	(2)
1999–2000	Jokerit	45	(2)
2001	Atlantis	27	(3)
2002–2004	Allianssi	61	(6)

International career
- Finland U21
1993–2001	Finland	19	(1)

Managerial career
- 2018–2023: PK-35 (women)
- * Club domestic league appearances and goals

Rami Rantanen (born 25 November 1968) is a Finnish football coach and a retired football midfielder, who most recently served as head coach of PK-35 (women) in the Kansallinen Liiga. Besides in his native Finland, he played for Swedish Trelleborgs FF in Allsvenskan during the mid-1990s.

== Personal life ==
He is the father of Daniel Rantanen and Amanda Rantanen who both have played football professionally.

== Career statistics ==
=== Club ===
Appearances and goals by club, season and competition
Club	Season	League			Cup (Note: Includes Suomen Cup)		Europe		Total	
Club	Season	Division	Apps	Goals	Apps	Goals	Apps	Goals	Apps	Goals
HJK	1987	Mestaruussarja	8	2	–		1 (Note: Appearance(s) in European Cup)	0	9	2
HJK	1988	Mestaruussarja	16	2	–		–		16	2
HJK	Total		24	4	0	0	1	0	25	4
Reipas Lahti	1989	Mestaruussarja	27	3	–		–		27	3
Reipas Lahti	1990	Veikkausliiga	26	3	–		–		26	3
Reipas Lahti	Total		53	6	0	0	0	0	53	6
Kuusysi	1991	Veikkausliiga	25	2	–		1 (Note: Appearance(s) in UEFA Cup)	0	26	2
HJK	1992	Veikkausliiga	18	2	–		–		18	2
HJK	1993	Veikkausliiga	18	2	–		–		18	2
HJK	1994	Veikkausliiga	26	0	–		3 (Note: Appearances in UEFA Cup Winners' Cup)	1	29	1
HJK	Total		62	4	0	0	3	1	65	5
Trelleborg	1995	Allsvenskan	23	5	–		–		23	5
Trelleborg	1996	Allsvenskan	13	0	–		–		13	0
Trelleborg	1997	Allsvenskan	24	0	–		–		24	0
Trelleborg	Total		60	5	0	0	0	0	60	5
PK-35	1998	Veikkausliiga	25	2	–		–		25	2
Jokerit	1999	Veikkausliiga	25	2	1	0	5 (Note: Appearances in UEFA Intertoto Cup)	1	31	3
Jokerit	2000	Veikkausliiga	20	0	–		–		20	0
Jokerit	Total		45	2	1	0	5	1	51	3
Atlantis	2001	Veikkausliiga	27	3	1	0	–		28	3
AC Allianssi	2002	Veikkausliiga	22	2	–		–		22	2
AC Allianssi	2003	Veikkausliiga	15	4	–		6	0	21	4
AC Allianssi	2004	Veikkausliiga	24	0	–		2	0	26	0
AC Allianssi	Total		61	6	0	0	8	0	69	6
Career total			382	36	2	0	18	2	402	38

=== International goals ===
As of match played 9 May 2001. Finland score listed first, score column indicates score after each Rantanen goal.

List of international goals scored by Rami Rantanen
No.	Date	Venue	Opponent	Score	Result	Competition
1	9 May 2001	Kuressaare linnastaadion, Kuressaare, Estonia	Estonia	1–0	1–1	Friendly

== Honours ==
Kuusysi

- Veikkausliiga: 1991

HJK

- Veikkausliiga: 1992

Jokerit

- Finnish Cup: 1999

Atlantis

- Finnish Cup: 2001
