= Riikka Ketoja =

Finnish footballer (born 1994)

Personal information
- Date of birth: 10 September 1994 (age 32)
- Position: Midfielder

Senior career*
| Years | Team | Apps | (Gls) |
| 2009–2010 | United Pietarsaari | 40 | (3) |
| 2011–2014 | Kokkola F10 | 73 | (6) |
| 2015–2016 | Sunnanå | 31 | (3) |
| 2017–2018 | TPS | 42 | (4) |

International career^{‡}
| 2009–2011 | Finland U17 | 12 | (1) |
| 2011–2013 | Finland U19 | 11 | (2) |
| 2014 | Finland | 1 | (0) |
- * Club domestic league appearances and goals as of 20 October 2018 ‡ National team caps and goals as of 11 June 2017

Riikka Ketoja (born 10 September 1994) is a Finnish footballer who plays as a midfielder. She has been a member of the Finland women's national team.
