= Gabriela Matoušková =

Czech footballer

Personal information
- Full name: Gabriela Matoušková
- Date of birth: 9 August 1992 (age 34)
- Place of birth: Prostějov, Czech Republic
- Height: 1.65 m (5 ft 5 in)
- Position: Striker

Youth career
- TJ Sokol Určice
- Kostelec na Hané
- → Slovácko (loan)

Senior career*
Years	Team	Apps	(Gls)
- → Slovácko (loan)
2013–2014	→ Bohemians Prague (loan)		
2014–2015	→ Sparta Prague (loan)		
2015–2020	Sparta Prague		
2020–2021	Pink Bari	12	(0)
2021–2022	Sparta Prague		

International career^{‡}
2015–2021	Czech Republic	9	(0)
- * Club domestic league appearances and goals ‡ National team caps and goals as of 19 July 2022

Gabriela Matoušková (born 9 August 1992) is a Czech former football forward who last played for Sparta Prague in the Czech Women's First League.

She was a member of the Czech national team. Matoušková made her debut for the national team in a match against Armenia on 19 September 2012.
