= PK-35 (women) =

Finnish football team

- Full name: Pallokerho-35 Naiset
- Nickname: Punamustat (The Red-blacks)
- Founded: 1978
- Ground: MagneCit Areena; Pihlajamäki, Helsinki
- Manager: Jeff Barck
- Coach: Rami Rantanen
- League: Kansallinen Liiga
- 2024: 6th
- Website: www.pk-35.fi
Home colours	Away colours

Pallokerho-35 (PK-35) Naiset is the representative women's football team of the Helsinki-based football club Pallokerho-35 (PK-35). The team debuted in Finland's top-level league, the Kansallinen Liiga, for the 2020 season. They gained promotion at the end of the previous season, winning the 2019 qualifier against IK Myran. PK-35 had previously reached the ascending qualifier in the 2018 season but lost to Oulu Nice Soccer (ONS).

PK-35's home ground is MagneCit Areena in the Pihlajamäki (Swedish: Rönnbacka) sub-district of Malmi, Helsinki. They also play home matches at the Pihlajamäen tekonurmi (Pihlajamäki astroturf), which has a capacity of 300 spectators.

== History ==
PK-35’s women’s football team was established in 1978, and the team played its first match at Pihlajamäki Field on June 12, 1978. The team first participated in an organized league in 1982. In 1992, PK-35 reached the Naisten I-divisoona qualifiers but did not secure promotion that season.

In 1994, the third-tier Naisten I-divisoona was renamed Naisten Kakkonen, and PK-35 earned promotion to the renamed league for the 1999 season. The team competed in Naisten Kakkonen until the end of the 2007 season when, under head coach Mitri Pakkasen, they ascended to the second-tier Naisten Ykkönen.

At the end of the 2008 season, the PK-35 men’s and women’s representative teams were relocated to Vantaa, where they became the men’s and women’s representative teams of the newly-created club, PK-35 Vantaa. The transfer was done in the hope that the teams would have access to better resources in Vantaa. However, representative team activities carried on in Helsinki and the Helsinki-based PK-35 women’s team continued in the fourth-tier Naisten Kolmonen.

PK-35 earned promotion to the Naisten Ykkönen for the 2018 season after beating Malmin Palloseura and winning the club‘s seat. Rami Rantanen, who had previously coached the PK-35 junior-B girls team, took over as head coach of the women‘s representative team prior to the 2018 season. In 2018, PK-35 ranked second in the Naisten Ykkönen but lost the two-game qualifier against Oulu Nice Soccer and remained in the Ykkönen. In the following season, the team finally earned promotion to the Naisten Liiga after beating IK Myran in the qualifier. The first qualification match between PK-35 and IK Myran ended in a 2–2 tie. No goals were scored during regulation time of the second qualification match and the match dragged on to the penalty shootout. PK-35 eventually claimed a 4–2 victory after the penalty shootout.

== Players and personnel ==
Updated 30 May 2020

=== Current squad ===
Note: Flags indicate national team as defined under FIFA eligibility rules; some limited exceptions apply. Players may hold more than one non-FIFA nationality.

No.	Pos.	Nation	Player
1	GK	FIN	Nea Vidgren
2	DF	FIN	Julie Forss
3	DF	FIN	Martta Laitinen
6	DF	FIN	Jade Bergius
7	FW	FIN	Pia Tavi
8	MF	FIN	Krista Hakala
9	DF	FIN	Inka Hiltunen
10	FW	FIN	Anita Abu
11	DF	FIN	Olivia Kåhre
12	GK	FIN	Tanja Kotoaro
13	MF	FIN	Elisa Ikonen
14	MF	FIN	Natalia Kusmin
15	DF	FIN	Vilma Oksanen

No.	Pos.	Nation	Player
16	MF	FIN	Neea Hassinen
17	FW	FIN	Mette Barck
18	DF	FIN	Dolma Gurung
19	MF	FIN	Minea Lassas
20	FW	FIN	Emilia Kupsanen
22	DF	FIN	Heljä Jokela
23	DF	FIN	Johanna Grönlund
24	DF	FIN	Ada Lindroth
25	MF	FIN	Suvi Kärkkäinen
26	MF	FIN	Maija Markkanen

=== Coaches and staff ===
- Head Coach: Rami Rantanen
- Assistant Coach: Krista Dahlberg
- Assistant Coach: Anne-Maria Weckström-Rantanen
- Goalkeeping Coach: Henrik Salmelainen
- Doctor, caretaker: Jan-Patrik Wiksten
- Team Manager: Karolina Hurmerinta
