= Riikka Hannula =

Finnish footballer (born 1990)

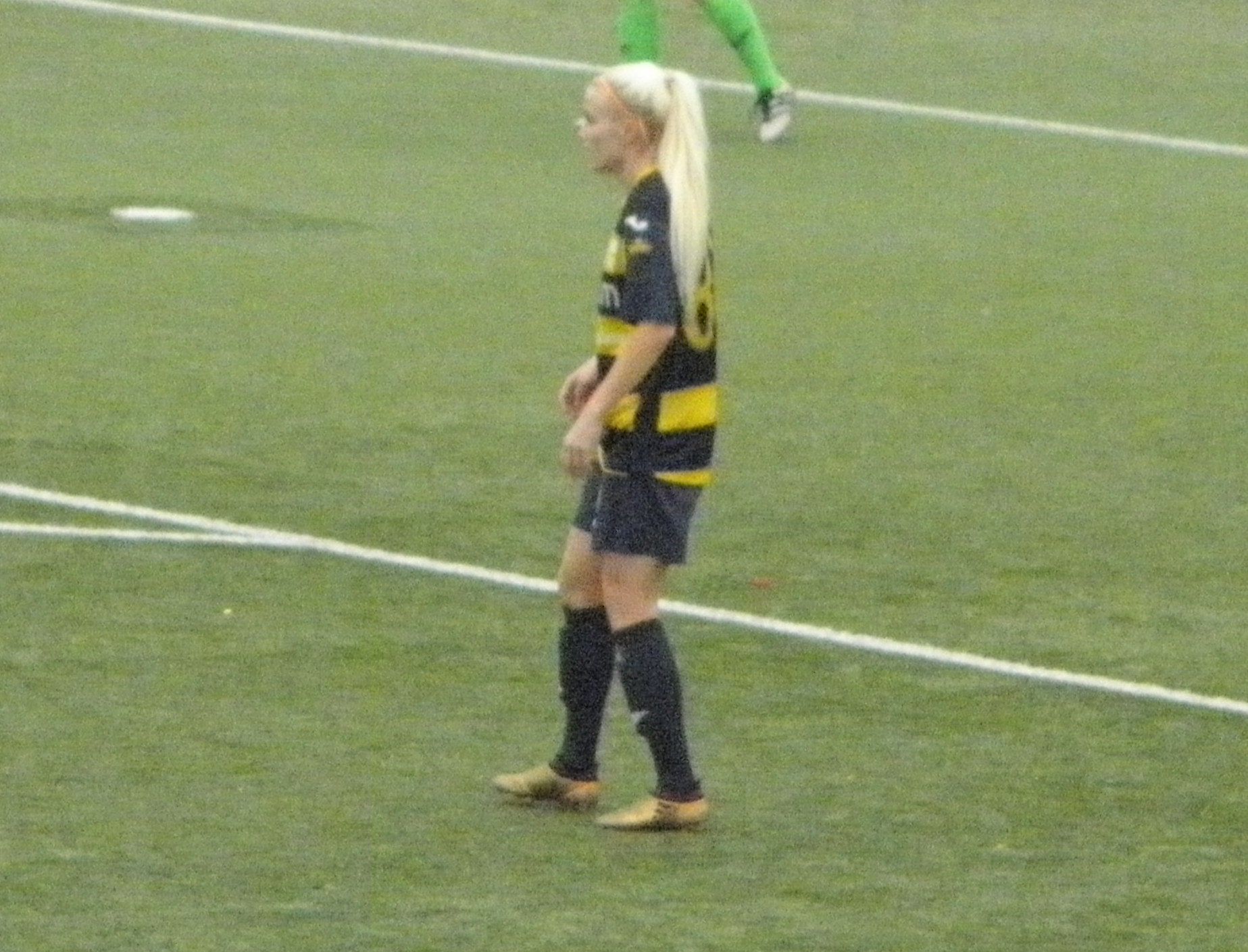

Personal information
- Full name: Riikka Maria Helena Hannula
- Date of birth: 20 March 1990 (age 36)
- Position: Midfielder

Senior career*
Years	Team	Apps	(Gls)
2010	TiPS	21	(3)
2011–2013	MPS		
2014–2016	Honka	58	(31)
2017	ASD Fimauto Valpolicella		
2017	RCD Espanyol	4	(0)
2017–2018	Hellas Verona	16	(3)
2018	Sassuolo	3	(1)
2019–2020	Honka	23	(9)
- * Club domestic league appearances and goals

Riikka Hannula (born 20 March 1990) is a Finnish former footballer who played as a forward.

== Career ==
Riikka Hannula began her career at the Kansallinen Liiga team FC Honka winning the Finnish Women's Cup in 2014 and 2015, in 2016 Riikka Hannula transferred to the Serie B side Verona.

In July 2017, Hannula moved to the Spanish Liga F club Espanyol only to leave three months later due to personal issues.

In November 2017 Riikka Hannula returned to play professional football in Italy only this time for the Serie A team Verona.

In 2018 Hannuala moved to Sassuolo. Hannula move to the Italian side was unsuccessful and Hannula moved back to Finland with Honka.

== Honours ==
Honka FC

- Finnish Women's Cup: 2014, 2015
