= Hana Sloupová =

Czech footballer

Personal information
- Full name: Hana Sloupová
- Date of birth: 25 November 1991 (age 34)
- Place of birth: Brno, Czechoslovakia
- Height: 1.70 m (5 ft 7 in)
- Position: Goalkeeper

Youth career
- Otnice
- Brno

Senior career*
Years	Team	Apps	(Gls)
2009–2022	Sparta Praha		

International career^{‡}
2010–2020	Czech Republic	11	(0)
- * Club domestic league appearances and goals ‡ National team caps and goals as of 19 July 2022

Hana Sloupová (born 25 November 1991) is a former Czech football goalkeeper, who played for Sparta Praha in the Czech Women's First League.

She was a member of the Czech national team. She made her debut on 26 November 2009 in a match against Belgium.
