= Kokkola Futis 10 =

Finnish football club

Kokkola F10
- Full name: Kokkola Futis 10
- Founded: 2010
- Ground: Kokkolan keskuskenttä, Kokkola
- Capacity: 2,000
- Coach: Michael Käld
- League: Naisten Liiga
- 2012: 5th
| Home colours | Away colours |

Kokkola Futis 10 is a women's football club based in Kokkola, Finland. It was established in 2010 as the successor of KPV Kokkola's women's section. Kokkola F10 plays currently in the Finnish women's premier division Naisten Liiga.

== Squad 2013 ==
As of 22 June 2013. Note: Flags indicate national team as defined under FIFA eligibility rules; some limited exceptions apply. Players may hold more than one non-FIFA nationality.

| No. | Pos. | Nation | Player |
|---|---|---|---|
| 1 | GK | (Finland) FIN | Linda Säätelä |
| 4 | DF | (Finland) FIN | Janni Laakso |
| 5 | DF | (United States) USA | Leigh Jakes |
| 6 | MF | (Finland) FIN | Viktoria Byskata |
| 7 | | (Finland) FIN | Ebba Sandell |
| 8 | MF | (Finland) FIN | Riikka Ketoja |
| 9 | | (Finland) FIN | Ada Mannström |
| 10 | FW | (Finland) FIN | Tanja Nousiainen |
| 11 | MF | (Finland) FIN | Emmi Alanen |
| 12 | GK | (Finland) FIN | Krista Moisio |

| No. | Pos. | Nation | Player |
|---|---|---|---|
| 13 | MF | (Nigeria) NGA | Soo Adekwagh |
| 14 | FW | (Finland) FIN | Louise Björkskog |
| 19 | | (Finland) FIN | Larissa Kuikka |
| 20 | FW | (Nigeria) NGA | Grace Okonkwo Amarachi |
| 21 | | (Finland) FIN | Iina Järvinen |
| 23 | | (Finland) FIN | Natalia Kuikka |
| 30 | MF | (Finland) FIN | Kaisa Kotka |
| 70 | | (Finland) FIN | Eva-Susanna Dahlmars |
| 97 | | (Finland) FIN | Tia Hälinen |
