= Kuopio Football Stadium =

Football stadium in Kuopio, Finland

- Kuopion keskuskenttä
- Väre Areena
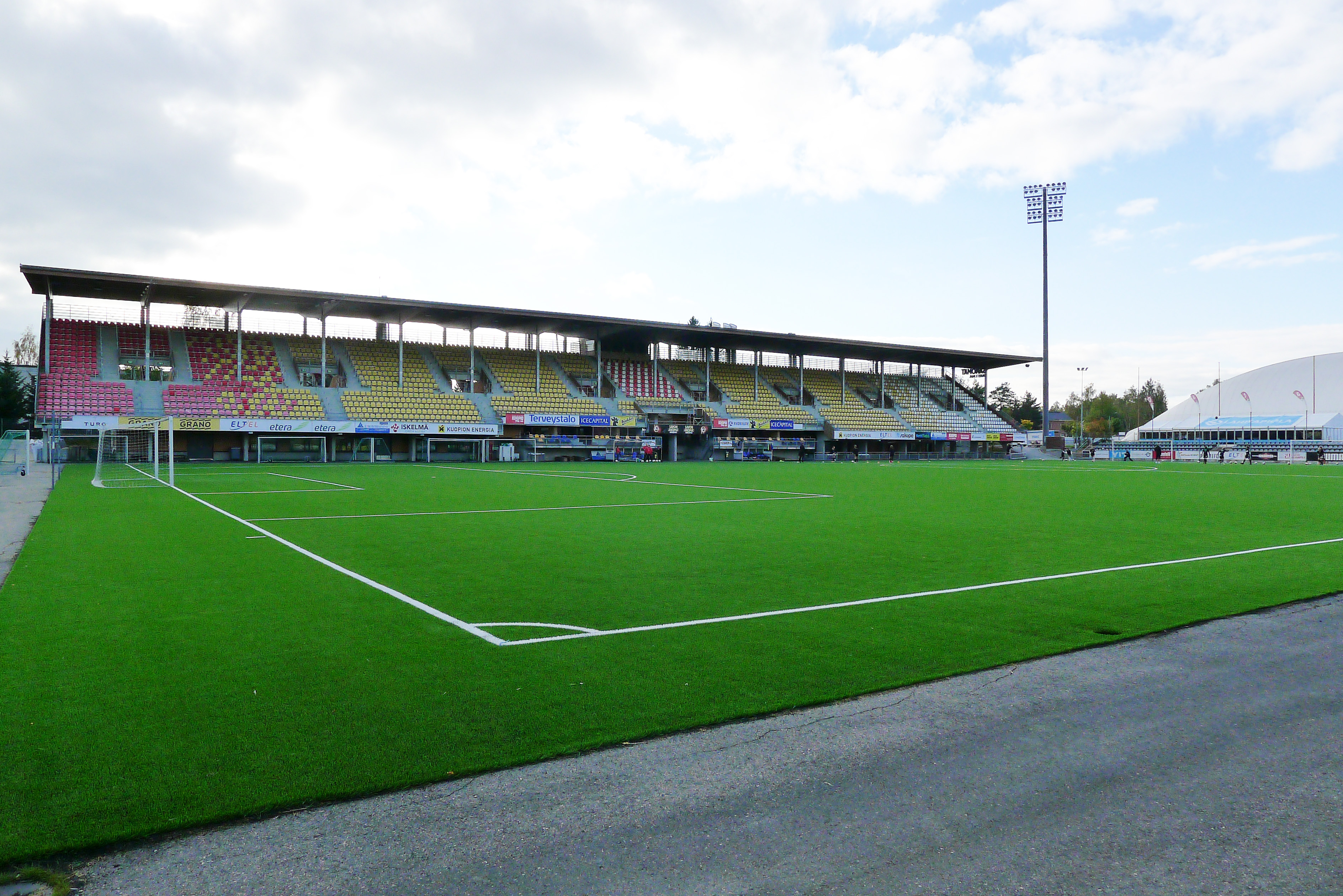
- Interactive map of Kuopio Football Stadium
- Former names: Savon Sanomat Areena, Magnum Areena
- Location: Kuopio, Finland
- Coordinates: 62.88463°N 27.6718°E
- Owner: Kiinteistö Oy Kuopion Keskuskenttä
- Operator: Kiinteistö Oy Kuopion Keskuskenttä
- Capacity: 3,000 seating, 2,000 standing
- Surface: Artificial turf
- Field size: 105 m × 68 m (344 ft × 223 ft)

Construction
- Opened: 1939–
- Renovated: 2003–2005

Tenants
- KuPS; Pallokissat

Kuopio Football Stadium (Finnish: Kuopion keskuskenttä), also known as Väre Areena (formerly Savon Sanomat Areena, Magnum Areena) is a multi-use stadium in Kuopio, Finland. It is currently used mostly for football matches and is the home stadium of KuPS and Pallokissat . The stadium holds 5,000 and was built in 2005.

== Gallery ==
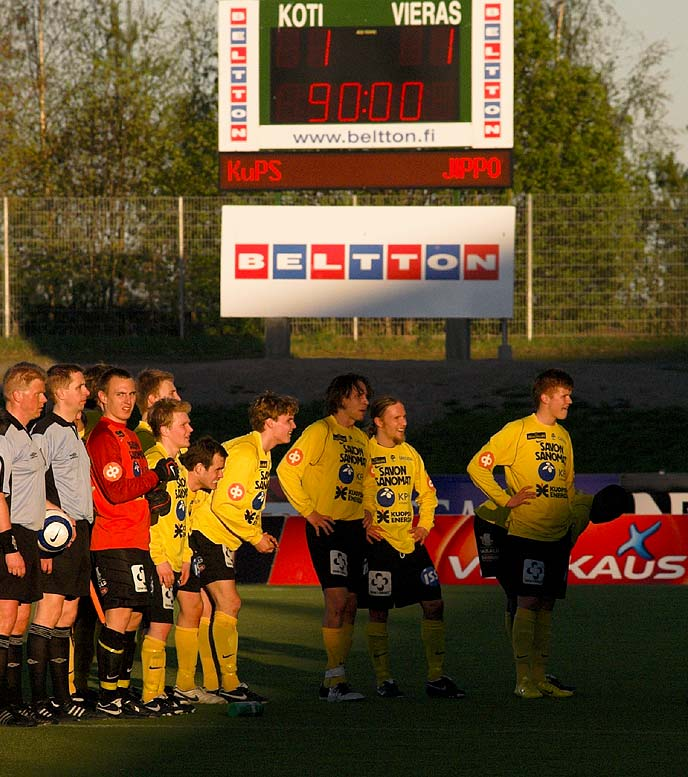
KuPS Kuopio vs. JIPPO Joensuu

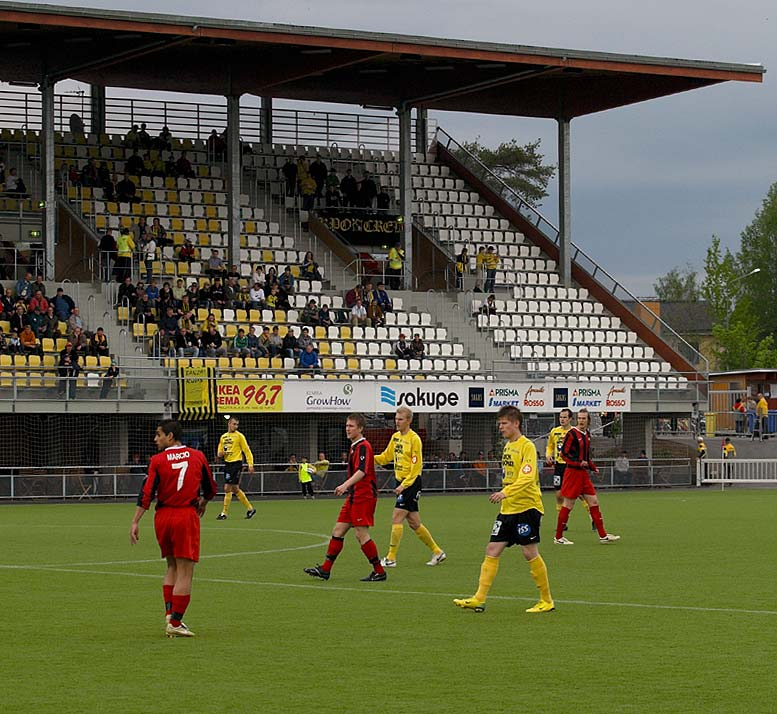
KuPS Kuopio vs. JIPPO Joensuu
