= Pallokissat =

Finnish football club

- Founded: 2011
- Ground: (Finland) Savon Sanomat Areena, Kuopio
- Capacity: 4,000
- Coach: Ollipekka Ojala
- League: Naisten Liiga
- 2018: 10th – Naisten Liiga

Pallokissat is a women's association football club from Kuopio, Finland, playing in the Finnish women's premier division Naisten Liiga. Home ground for Pallokissat is the Savon Sanomat Areena.

== History ==
Pallokissat was founded in 2007 as the youth academy for KMF Kuopio. The club was originally called "KMF Juniorit", name change was made in 2010. Pallokissat was promoted to the Finnish Women's League in January 2012 as KMF Kuopio was defunct due to financial difficulties.
