= Ollipekka Ojala =

Finnish football manager (born 1986)

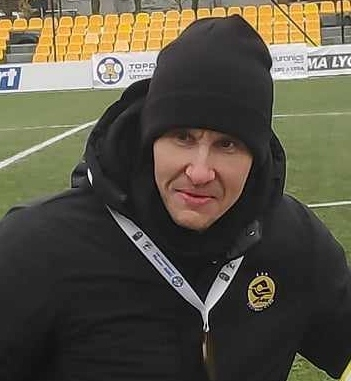

Personal information
- Date of birth: 1 December 1986 (age 39)
- Place of birth: Kuopio, Finland

Managerial career
- Years: Team
- 2014–2016: Pallokissat
- 2018: Ilves (women)
- 2019–2023: KuPS (women)
- 2024: Gintra
- 2025–: KuPS

Ollipekka Ojala (born 1 December 1986) is a Finnish football manager who last managed Gintra.

== Career ==
Ojala started his managerial career with Finnish women's side Pallokissat in 2014. Four years later, he was appointed manager of Finnish women's side Ilves. In 2019, he was appointed manager of Finnish women's side KuPS, helping the club win three league titles.

Subsequently, he was appointed manager of Lithuanian women's side Gintra in 2024. While managing the club, Lithuanian news website Sportas24.lt wrote that he "the beginning for the strategist in the new club was not paved with roses and he had to experience the bitterness of defeat already in the debut match". However, he eventually helped the club win the league title.

== Personal life ==
Ojala was born on 1 December 1986 in Kuopio, Finland. The father of two children, he has been married.

== Honours ==
KuPS

- Kansallinen Liiga (3): 2021, 2022, 2023

Gintra

- Lithuanian Women's A League: 2024
