= Merilappi United =

Finnish football club

- Founded: 2011
- Ground: (Finland) City Sport Areena, Kemi
- Chairman: Hannele Keränen
- Coach: Jukka-Pekka Poutiainen
- League: Naisten Liiga
- 2013: 1st – Naisten Ykkönen (promoted)
- Website: http://www.merilappiunited.fi/

Merilappi United is women's association football club from Kemi, Finland. It was founded in October 2011 as a merger of two local clubs, Kemin Into and Visan Pallo. Merilappi United plays in the Finnish women's premier division Naisten Liiga.
