= Tikkurilan Palloseura =

Finnish association football club

- Full name: Tikkurilan Palloseura
- Nickname(s): TiPS
- Founded: 1958; 67 years ago
- Ground: Tikkurilan urheilupuisto, Tikkurila, Vantaa
- Capacity: 1000
- Chairman: Tapio Rostedt
- Coordinator: Tina Kuusela
- League: Naisten Liiga
Home colours

Tikkurilan Palloseura (abbreviated TiPS) is a football club from Tikkurila in Vantaa, Finland. The club was established in 1958 and its main catchment areas comprise Tikkurila and Hakunila in Itä-Vantaa (East Vantaa). The women's team competes in the Kansallinen Liiga ('National Liga') which is the highest division of women's football in Finland. Men's team competes in the Kolmonen ('Third Division') which is the fourth highest division in Finland. The club's home ground is at Tikkurilan urheilupuisto ('Tikkurila Sports Park').

== Background ==
TiPS men played two seasons in the Ykkönen ('First Division'), the second tier of Finnish football in 1996 and 1997. They also have had six spells covering 12 seasons in the third tier, the Kakkonen ('Second Division'), in 1980–85, 1991–92, 1995, 1998, 2004 and 2011.

Their history became somewhat distorted in 1998 when Jalkapalloseura Airport City (AC Vantaa) was established as a flagship club for Vantaa following the merger of TiPS and Vantaan Jalkapalloseura men's first teams with assistance from Koivukylän Palloseura, Pallokerho-50 and Itä-Vantaan Urheilijat clubs. TiPS finished top of the East Group of the Kakkonen (Second Division) in 1998 and their place in the Ykkönen (First Division) in 1999 was taken by the new AC Vantaa club.

TiPS men started again in the Kutonen ('Sixth Division') and by 2004 had progressed through the divisions back to the Kakkonen ('Second Division'), coincidentally at a higher level than AC Vantaa who at the same time had been relegated to the Kolmonen. However their stay in third-tier football was this time short-lived and over the last few years TiPS have been playing in the Nelonen (Fourth Division) and Kolmonen (Third Division). TiPS earned promotion back to Kakkonen for the 2011 season, but soon dropped back to Kolmonen.

Tikkurilan Palloseura is better known for its successful women's team and high level girl's junior football. Girls from many age groups have been representing juniors' national teams and are playing in the highest national level.

Tikkurilan Palloseura is one of Finland's largest football clubs, bringing together players and officials from different backgrounds. The club provides coaching and training programmes to ensure equal opportunities for everyone to participate, develop, practice and compete.

Children and young people are able to enjoy football in a familiar and safe environment where opportunities are provided for youngsters to fulfill their potential as well as assisting their social development.

== Season to season Men's team ==
Season to Season

Season	Level	Division	Section	Administration	Position	Movements
1969	Tier 4	Aluesarja (Area Series)	Group 2 Helsinki & Uusimaa	Finnish FA (Suomen Pallolitto)	5th	
1970	Tier 4	4. divisioona (Fourth Division)	Group 2 Helsinki & Uusimaa	Finnish FA (Suomen Pallolitto)	1st	Promoted
1971	Tier 3	3. divisioona (Third Division)	Group 4	Finnish FA (Suomen Pallolitto)	11th	
1972	Tier 3	3. divisioona (Third Division)	Group 5	Finnish FA (Suomen Pallolitto)	8th	
1973	Tier 4	3. divisioona (Third Division)	Group 1 Helsinki & Uusimaa	Finnish FA (Suomen Pallolitto)	4th	
1974	Tier 4	3. divisioona (Third Division)	Group 1 Helsinki & Uusimaa	Finnish FA (Suomen Pallolitto)	9th	Relegated
1975	Tier 5	4. divisioona (Fourth Division)	Group 1 Helsinki & Uusimaa	Finnish FA (Suomen Pallolitto)	1st	Promoted
1976	Tier 4	3. divisioona (Third Division)	Group 2 Helsinki & Uusimaa	Finnish FA (Suomen Pallolitto)	9th	Relegated
1977	Tier 5	4. divisioona (Fourth Division)	Group 3 Helsinki & Uusimaa	Finnish FA (Suomen Pallolitto)	1st	Promoted
1978	Tier 4	3. divisioona (Third Division)	Group 1 Helsinki & Uusimaa	Finnish FA (Suomen Pallolitto)	2nd	
1979	Tier 4	3. divisioona (Third Division)	Group 1 Helsinki & Uusimaa	Finnish FA (Suomen Pallolitto)	1st	Promotion Playoff - Promoted
1980	Tier 3	2. divisioona (Second Division)	West Group	Finnish FA (Suomen Pallolitto)	7th	
1981	Tier 3	2. divisioona (Second Division)	West Group	Finnish FA (Suomen Pallolitto)	6th	
1982	Tier 3	2. divisioona (Second Division)	East Group	Finnish FA (Suomen Pallolitto)	6th	
1983	Tier 3	2. divisioona (Second Division)	East Group	Finnish FA (Suomen Pallolitto)	6th	
1984	Tier 3	2. divisioona (Second Division)	East Group	Finnish FA (Suomen Pallolitto)	9th	
1985	Tier 3	2. divisioona (Second Division)	West Group	Finnish FA (Suomen Pallolitto)	12th	Relegated
1986	Tier 4	3. divisioona (Third Division)	Group 1 Helsinki & Uusimaa	Finnish FA (Suomen Pallolitto)	10th	
1987	Tier 4	3. divisioona (Third Division)	Group 2 Helsinki & Uusimaa	Finnish FA (Suomen Pallolitto)	3rd	
1988	Tier 4	3. divisioona (Third Division)	Group 1 Helsinki & Uusimaa	Finnish FA (Suomen Pallolitto)	7th	
1989	Tier 4	3. divisioona (Third Division)	Group 1 Helsinki & Uusimaa	Finnish FA (Suomen Pallolitto)	7th	
1990	Tier 4	3. divisioona (Third Division)	Group 1 Helsinki & Uusimaa	Finnish FA (Suomen Pallolitto)	1st	Promoted
1991	Tier 3	2. divisioona (Second Division)	East Group	Finnish FA (Suomen Pallolitto)	7th	
1992	Tier 3	Kakkonen (Second Division)	East Group	Finnish FA (Suomen Pallolitto)	10th	Relegation Playoff Relegated
1993	Tier 4	Kolmonen (Third Division)	Group 1	Finnish FA (Suomen Pallolitto)	4th	
1994	Tier 4	Kolmonen (Third Division)	Section 2	Finnish FA (Suomen Pallolitto)	1st	Promoted
1995	Tier 3	Kakkonen (Second Division)	East Group	Finnish FA (Suomen Pallolitto)	1st	Promoted
1996	Tier 2	Ykkönen (First Division)	South Group	Finnish FA (Suomen Pallolitto)	4th	
1997	Tier 2	Ykkönen (First Division)	South Group	Finnish FA (Suomen Pallolitto)	9th	Relegation Group – Relegated
1998	Tier 3	Kakkonen (Second Division)	South Group	Finnish FA (Suomen Pallolitto)	1st	Promoted
1999		Ykkönen (First Division)				Place taken by AC Vantaa
2000	Tier 7	Kutonen (Sixth Division)	Section 5	Uusimaa District (SPL Uusimaa)	2nd	Promoted
2001	Tier 6	Vitonen (Fifth Division)	Section 2	Uusimaa District (SPL Uusimaa)	1st	Promoted
2002	Tier 4	Kolmonen (Third Division)	Section 3	Helsinki & Uusimaa (SPL Uusimaa)	8th	
2003	Tier 4	Kolmonen (Third Division)	Section 2	Helsinki & Uusimaa (SPL Uusimaa)	1st	Promoted
2004	Tier 3	Kakkonen (Second Division)	South Group	Finnish FA (Suomen Pallolitto)	13th	Relegated
2005	Tier 4	Kolmonen (Third Division)	Section 3	Helsinki & Uusimaa (SPL Helsinki)	2nd	
2006	Tier 4	Kolmonen (Third Division)	Section 2	Helsinki & Uusimaa (SPL Uusimaa)	6th	Took place of TiPS M2 Reservi in 2007
2007	Tier 5	Nelonen (Fourth Division)	Section 2	Uusimaa (SPL Uusimaa)	3rd	
2008	Tier 5	Nelonen (Fourth Division)	Section 2	Uusimaa (SPL Uusimaa)	5th	
2009	Tier 5	Nelonen (Fourth Division)	Section 2	Uusimaa (SPL Uusimaa)	1st	Promoted
2010	Tier 4	Kolmonen (Third Division)	Section 1	Helsinki & Uusimaa (SPL Uusimaa)	1st	Promoted
2011	Tier 3	Kakkonen (Second Division)	Group B	Finnish FA (Suomen Pallolitto)	14th	Relegated
2012	Tier 4	Kolmonen (Third Division)	Group 3	Helsinki & Uusimaa (SPL Uusimaa)	11th	Relegated
2013	Tier 5	Nelonen (Fourth Division)	Group 2	Uusimaa (SPL Uusimaa)	5th	
2014	Tier 5	Nelonen (Fourth Division)	Group 1	Uusimaa (SPL Uusimaa)	5th	
2015	Tier 5	Nelonen (Fourth Division)	Group 2	Uusimaa (SPL Uusimaa)	2nd	Lost Promotion Playoff
2016	Tier 4	Kolmonen (Third Division)	Group C	Helsinki & Uusimaa (SPL Uusimaa)	7th	
2017	Tier 4	Kolmonen (Third Division)	Group 2	Helsinki & Uusimaa (SPL Uusimaa)	5th	
2018	Tier 4	Kolmonen (Third Division)	Group 2	Helsinki & Uusimaa (SPL Uusimaa)	3rd	
2019	Tier 4	Kolmonen (Third Division)	Group 2	Helsinki & Uusimaa (SPL Uusimaa)	2nd	
2020	Tier 4	Kolmonen (Third Division)	Group B	Finnish FA Southern (South)	3rd	
2021	Tier 4	Kolmonen (Third Division)	Group B	Finnish FA Southern (South)	5th	
2022	Tier 4	Kolmonen (Third Division)	Group C	Finnish FA Southern (South)	1st	Promoted
2023	Tier 3	Kakkonen (Second Division)	Group A	Finnish FA (Suomen Pallolitto)	12th	Relegated
2024	Tier 5	Kolmonen (Third Division)	Group C	Finnish FA Southern(South)	3rd	

- 2 seasons in 2nd Tier
- 15 seasons in 3rd Tier
- 27 seasons in 4th Tier
- 9 season in 5th Tier
- 1 seasons in 6th Tier
- 1 season in 7th Tier

== Structure ==
The club runs a large number of teams including 2 men's teams, 2 women's teams and a very wide range of girls and boys junior teams. TiPS organises diverse activities for its players including an academy and Football Coaching Schools.

== 2011 season ==
For the current season TiPS Women's Team is competing in the highest level in Naisten Liiga.

TiPS Men's Team is competing in Group B (Lohko B) of the Kakkonen administered by the Finnish FA. This is the third highest tier in the Finnish football system. In 2010 TiPS was promoted from the Kolmonen.

TiPS M2 is participating in Section 2 (Lohko 2) of the Vitonen administered by the Uusimaa SPL. In 2009 TiPS AN were relegated from the Vitonen.

== Men's team ==
As of 17 April 2018.

Note: Flags indicate national team as defined under FIFA eligibility rules; some limited exceptions apply. Players may hold more than one non-FIFA nationality.

No.	Pos.	Nation	Player
1	GK	FIN	Jussi Hämäläinen
2	DF	FIN	Henri Nieminen
5	MF	Nigeria	Christopher Onyema Uchechi
6	MF	FIN	Aki Miettinen
7	DF	FIN	Mika Karpoff
8	DF	FIN	Juha Mäkelä
10	MF	FIN	Kim Kuusisto
11	MF	Serbia	Nemanja Biga
12	GK	FIN	Eemeli Lohvansuu
14	DF	FIN	Aki Tuovinen
15	DF	FIN	Ari Salonen
16	DF	FIN	Teemu Pyhämäki

No.	Pos.	Nation	Player
17	MF	FIN	Ymer Kaqamak
18	DF	FIN	Tomi Häihänen
19	MF	FIN	Toni Kneip
20	DF	FIN	Valtteri Lauri
21	DF	FIN	Kristian Konu
22	FW	Nigeria	Ifeanyichukwu Ezenwafor
23	FW	FIN	Nico Weckström
24	FW	FIN	Oskari Lehtonen
26	FW	FIN	Santeri Saarenpää
27	DF	FIN	Matti Suursalmi
28	FW	Nigeria	Phillip Nduka

== Women's team ==
As of 1 May 2020.

=== Squad ===
Note: Flags indicate national team as defined under FIFA eligibility rules; some limited exceptions apply. Players may hold more than one non-FIFA nationality.

No.	Pos.	Nation	Player
1	GK	FIN	Riina Isokääntä
2	DF	FIN	Emmi Siren
3	DF	FIN	Joanna Tynnilä
4	DF	FIN	Oona Siren
5	MF	FIN	Ronja Isokääntä
6	MF	FIN	Iiona Anttonen
7	MF	FIN	Anna Nurmi
10	FW	FIN	Jenna Topra
11	FW	FIN	Aino Martikainen
12	GK	FIN	Inna Vannula
13	FW	FIN	Melanie Azodo

No.	Pos.	Nation	Player
14	DF	FIN	Pinja Eklund
16	FW	FIN	Elina Mankki
17	DF	FIN	Waranya Chaimuk
19	MF	FIN	Neea Hassinen
20	MF	FIN	Annika Haanpää
21	DF	FIN	Liina Nora
23	MF	FIN	Elli-Nora Kainulainen
66	GK	FIN	Elsa Sulku
97	MF	FIN	Tia Hälinen

=== Honours and achievements ===
- Naisten Ykkönen Winners (2): 2009, 2019
- Finnish Women's Cup Winners (4): 2011, 2012, 2013, 2016
