= FCU Olimpia Cluj in European football =

This is a compilation of Olimpia Cluj's matches in official international women's football competitions. Olimpia has represented Romania in all editions of the UEFA Women's Champions League since their debut in the 2011-12 season, and they have been knocked out in the Round of 16 once, in the Round of 32 twice and in the qualifying round in four occasions. After the 2016–17 season they hold a 15 – 2 – 9 record in the competition.

== Overall record ==
Competition	Round	Country	Club	Aggregate	Home	Away
2011–12 UEFA Women's Champions League	Qualifying round	(Bosnia and Herzegovina)	SFK 2000 Sarajevo	3–1		
2011–12 UEFA Women's Champions League	Qualifying round	(Lithuania)	Gintra Universitetas	5–0		
2011–12 UEFA Women's Champions League	Qualifying round	(Turkey)	Ataşehir Belediyesi	4–1		
2011–12 UEFA Women's Champions League	Round of 32	(France)	Olympique Lyonnais	0–12	0–9	0–3
2012–13 UEFA Women's Champions League	Qualifying round	(Malta)	Birkirkara	8–0		
2012–13 UEFA Women's Champions League	Qualifying round	(Northern Ireland)	Glentoran	4–2		
2012–13 UEFA Women's Champions League	Qualifying round	(Portugal)	1º de Dezembro	4–1		
2012–13 UEFA Women's Champions League	Round of 32	(Austria)	Neulengbach	3–3 (a)	1–1	2–2 a.e.t.
2012–13 UEFA Women's Champions League	Round of 16	(Italy)	Torres	1–7	0–3	1–4
2013–14 UEFA Women's Champions League	Qualifying round	(Lithuania)	Gintra Universitetas	3–0		
2013–14 UEFA Women's Champions League	Qualifying round	(Latvia)	Liepājas Metalurgs	7–0		
2013–14 UEFA Women's Champions League	Qualifying round	(Serbia)	Spartak Subotica	3–8		
2014–15 UEFA Women's Champions League	Qualifying round	(Republic of Ireland)	Raheny United	1–2		
2014–15 UEFA Women's Champions League	Qualifying round	(Malta)	Hibernians F.C.	5–0		
2014–15 UEFA Women's Champions League	Qualifying round	(Bulgaria)	FC NSA Sofia	4–0		
2015–16 UEFA Women's Champions League	Qualifying round	(Estonia)	Pärnu JK	4–0		
2015–16 UEFA Women's Champions League	Qualifying round	(Montenegro)	Ekonomist	6–1		
2015–16 UEFA Women's Champions League	Qualifying round	(Slovenia)	Pomurje	2–0		
2015–16 UEFA Women's Champions League	Round of 32	(France)	Paris SG	0–15	0–6	0–9

== 2011-12 UEFA Women's Champions League ==
=== Preliminary stage ===
11 August 2011
16:30

SFK Sarajevo (Bosnia and Herzegovina)	1 - 3	(Romania) Olimpia Cluj
Hamzić 61'		Dușa 4', 52'; Giurgiu 78'

Stadion Grbavica, Sarajevo
Attendance: 250
Referee: (Malta) Esther Azzopardi
13 August 2011
11:00

Olimpia Cluj (Romania)	5 - 0	(Lithuania) Gintra Universitetas
Cosma 33', 44'; Vătafu 41' (pen.); Dușa 80', 90+5'

Asim Ferhatović Hase Stadium, Sarajevo
Attendance: 50
Referee: (Germany) Anja Kunick
16 August 2011
17:00

Olimpia Cluj (Romania)	4 - 1	(Turkey) Atasehir Belediyesi
Dușa 23'; Lunca 64', 77'; Cosma 86'		Aladag 26'

Asim Ferhatović Hase Stadium, Sarajevo
Attendance: 21
Referee: (Germany) Anja Kunick

=== Round of 32 ===
28 September 2011
15:30

Olimpia Cluj (Romania)	0 – 9	(France) Olympique Lyonnais
		Schelin 12'; Le Sommer 17' (pen.), 22', 24'; Bompastor 32'; Renard 38'; Thomis 39'; Cruz Traña 44'; Majri 85'

Stadionul Dr. Constantin Rădulescu, Cluj-Napoca
Attendance: 1,157
Referee: (Armenia) Knarik Grigoryan
5 October 2011
19:00

Olympique Lyonnais (France)	3 – 0	(Romania) Olimpia Cluj
Abily 15', 82'; Le Sommer 51'

Stade de Gerland, Lyon
Attendance: 6,863
Referee: (Slovakia) Petra Chudá

== 2012-13 UEFA Women's Champions League ==
=== Qualifying stage ===
11 August 2012
20:00

Birkirkara FC (Malta)	0 – 8	(Romania) Olimpia Cluj
		Dușa 9', 90'; Sârghe 15'; Lunca 20'; Voicu 22'; Bortan 38'; Vătafu 60', 82'

National Stadium, Ta' Qali
Attendance: 110
Referee: (Norway) Marte Sørø
13 August 2012
20:00

Olimpia Cluj (Romania)	4 – 2	(Northern Ireland) Glentoran FC
Dușa 25', 76', 86'; Lunca 84'		Burk 16'; Vance 74'

National Stadium, Ta' Qali
Attendance: 75
Referee: (Germany) Riem Hussein
16 August 2012
17:00

Olimpia Cluj (Romania)	4 – 1	(Portugal) SU 1º Dezembro
Dușa 22', 34', 70'; Lunca 59'		Silva 20'

National Stadium, Ta' Qali
Attendance: 57
Referee: (Serbia) Gordana Kuzmanovic

=== Round of 32 ===
26 September 2012
16:00

Olimpia Cluj (Romania)	1 – 1	(Austria) SV Neulengbach
Dusa 57'		Gstöttner 84'

Cluj Arena, Cluj-Napoca
Attendance: 800
Referee: (Norway) Christina W. Pedersen
3 October 2012
19:30

SV Neulengbach (Austria)	2 – 2	(Romania) Olimpia Cluj
Giovana 30'; Gstöttner 108'		Lunca 81', 101'

Wienerwaldstadion, Neulengbach
Attendance: 1,150
Referee: (Spain) Paloma Quintero

=== Round of 16 ===
31 October 2012
20:00

ASD Torres (Italy)	4 – 1	(Romania) Olimpia Cluj
Domenichetti 10'; Panico 24', 73', 85'		Vătafu 51'

Stadio Vanni Sanna, Sassari
Attendance: 250
Referee: (Germany) Christine Baitinger
8 November 2012
17:00

Olimpia Cluj (Romania)	0 – 3	(Italy) ASD Torres
		Iannella 9'; Panico 62', 66'

Cluj Arena, Cluj-Napoca
Attendance: 1,000
Referee: (Switzerland) Esther Staubli

== 2013-14 UEFA Women's Champions League ==
=== Preliminary stage ===
8 August 2013
18:30

Olimpia Cluj (Romania)	3 – 0	(Lithuania) Gintra Universitetas
Lunca 26', 36'; Vatafu 48' (pen.)

Cluj Arena, Cluj-Napoca
Attendance: 500
Referee: (Hungary) Gyöngyi Gaál
10 August 2013
18:30

Olimpia Cluj (Romania)	7 – 0	(Latvia) Liepājas Metalurgs
Vatafu 20'; Voicu 24', 81'; Ficzay 27'; Bâtea 51'; Lunca 53', 89'

Cluj Arena, Cluj-Napoca
Attendance: 400
Referee: (Bulgaria) Aneliya Sinabova
13 August 2013
18:00

Olimpia Cluj (Romania)	3 - 8	(Serbia) Spartak Subotica
Vătafu 43' (pen.); Lunca 59', 81'		Čubrilo 1', 24', 64'; Nahi 16'; M. Nikolić 28', 33', 67', 90+3'

Cluj Arena, Cluj-Napoca
Attendance: 500
Referee: (Hungary) Gyöngyi Gaál

== 2014-15 UEFA Women's Champions League ==
=== Preliminary stage ===
9 August 2014
17:30

Olimpia Cluj (Romania)	1 – 2	(Republic of Ireland) Raheny United
Voicu 62'		Murray 23'; Shine 81'

Cluj Arena, Cluj-Napoca
Attendance: 300
Referee: (Spain) Elia Martínez
11 August 2014
17:30

Olimpia Cluj (Romania)	5 – 0	(Malta) Paola Hibernians
Voicu 7'; Vágó 45+1', 49', 80'; Bâtea 71'

Cluj Arena, Cluj-Napoca
Attendance: 200
Referee: (Luxembourg) Tania Morais
14 August 2014
17:00

Olimpia Cluj (Romania)	4 - 1	(Bulgaria) NSA Sofia
Vágó 41', 69'; Vătafu 56'; Iuşan 83'		Popadiynova 81'

Cluj Arena, Cluj-Napoca
Attendance: 200
Referee: (Spain) Elia Martínez

== 2015-16 UEFA Women's Champions League ==
=== Preliminary stage ===
11 August 2015
17:00

Olimpia Cluj (Romania)	4 – 0	(Estonia) Pärnu JK
Lunca 11', 63'; Voicu 41'; Olar 51'

Beltinci Sports Park, Beltinci
Attendance: 30
Referee: (Slovakia) Zuzana Kováčová
13 August 2015
17:00

Olimpia Cluj (Romania)	6 – 1	(Montenegro) Ekonomist Niksic
Popa 39'; Nedić 40' (o.g.); Corduneanu 45+1'; Voicu 45+3'; Lunca 73', 81'		Bojat 59'

Beltinci Sports Park, Beltinci
Attendance: 60
Referee: (Spain) Marta Frías
16 August 2015
17:00

ŽNK Pomurje (Slovenia)	0 – 2	(Romania) Olimpia Cluj
		Havriștiuc 13'; Voicu 52'

Beltinci Sports Park, Beltinci
Attendance: 1,200
Referee: (Slovakia) Zuzana Kováčová

=== Round of 32 ===
8 October 2015
16:00

Olimpia Cluj (Romania)	0 – 6	(France) Paris Saint-Germain
		Mittag 38', 71'; Cristiane 43', 54'; Cruz 79'; Sarr 90+1'

Cluj Arena, Cluj-Napoca
Attendance: 883
Referee: (Malta) Esther Azzopardi
14 October 2015
20:30

Paris Saint-Germain (France)	9 – 0	(Romania) Olimpia Cluj
Delannoy 21' (pen.); Cristiane 42', 49', 63'; Dahlkvist 53'; Horan 65', 66'; Olar 70' (o.g.); Sarr 84'

Stade Sébastien Charléty, Paris
Attendance: 1,249
Referee: (Finland) Lina Lehtovaara

== 2016-17 UEFA Women's Champions League ==
=== Preliminary stage ===
23 August 2016
11:00

Olimpia Cluj (Romania)	7 – 1	(Estonia) Pärnu JK
Popa 3', 7', 45'; Vătafu 21'; Voicu 39'; Lunca 50', 60'		Morkovkina 36'

Stadion im. Złotej Jedenastki, Konin
Attendance: 50
Referee: (Norway) Marte Sørø
25 August 2016
11:00

Olimpia Cluj (Romania)	10 – 0	(Montenegro) ŽFK Breznica
Popa 9', 11', 44'; Lunca 21', 26', 28', 41'; Vătafu 29', 83' (pen.); Bâtea 76'

Stadion im. Złotej Jedenastki, Konin
Attendance: 50
Referee: (Kazakhstan) Elvira Nurmustafina
28 August 2016
17:00

Medyk Konin (Poland)	3 – 1	(Romania) Olimpia Cluj
Sikora 26'; Daleszczyk 48', 89'		Lunca 90'

Stadion im. Złotej Jedenastki, Konin
Attendance: 600
Referee: (Norway) Marte Sørø
