= UEFA Women's Euro 2017 qualifying play-offs =

- Event: UEFA Women's Euro 2017 qualifying
Portugal	Romania
(Portugal)	(Romania)
1	1
- on aggregate Portugal won on away goals

First leg
Portugal	Romania
0	0
- Date: 21 October 2016
- Venue: Estádio do Restelo, Lisbon
- Referee: Katalin Kulcsár (Hungary)

Second leg
Romania	Portugal
1	1
- after extra time
- Date: 25 October 2016
- Venue: Stadionul Dr. Constantin Rădulescu, Cluj-Napoca
- Referee: Kateryna Monzul (Ukraine)

UEFA Women's Euro 2017 qualifying play-offs

The play-offs of the UEFA Women's Euro 2017 qualifying competition involved the two runners-up with the worst records among all eight groups in the qualifying group stage: Portugal and Romania. The draw for the play-offs (to decide the order of legs) was held on 23 September 2016.

The play-offs were played in home-and-away two-legged format. The play-off winner qualified for the final tournament.

== Ranking of second-placed teams ==
Despite the fact that every groups had 5 teams, in order to determine the six best second-placed teams from the qualifying group stage which qualified directly for the final tournament and the two remaining second-placed teams which advanced to the play-offs, the results against the fifth-placed team were not included. As a result, six matches played by each second-placed team were counted for the purposes of determining the ranking.

Pos	Grp	Team	Pld	W	D	L	GF	GA	GD	Pts	Qualification
1	1	Scotland	6	5	0	1	16	6	+10	15	Final tournament
2	4	Denmark	6	4	1	1	13	1	+12	13	Final tournament
3	6	Italy	6	4	0	2	13	7	+6	12	Final tournament
4	7	Belgium	6	3	2	1	16	5	+11	11	Final tournament
5	8	Austria	6	3	2	1	13	4	+9	11	Final tournament
6	5	Russia	6	3	1	2	12	9	+3	10	Final tournament
7	3	Romania	6	3	1	2	11	8	+3	10	Play-offs
8	2	Portugal	6	2	1	3	6	10	−4	7	Play-offs

Source: UEFA
Rules for classification: 1) points; 2) goal difference; 3) goals scored; 4) away goals scored; 5) disciplinary points; 6) coefficient.

== Overview ==
All times are CEST (UTC+2).

Team 1	Agg.	Team 2	1st leg	2nd leg
Portugal	(a) 1–1	Romania	0–0	1–1 (a.e.t.)

Portugal qualified for the final tournament.

== First leg ==
21 October 2016
19:45

Portugal	0–0	Romania
	Report

Estádio do Restelo, Lisbon
Attendance: 3,415
Referee: Katalin Kulcsár (Hungary)

Portugal	Romania

GK	12	Patrícia Morais
RB	5	Matilde Fidalgo
CB	4	Sílvia Rebelo
CB	15	Carole Costa
LB	9	Ana Borges
DM	14	Dolores Silva
CM	19	Amanda DaCosta	(substituted off) 67'
CM	20	Suzane Pires
AM	18	Carolina Mendes
CF	10	Ana Leite	(substituted off) 84'
CF	7	Cláudia Neto (c)
Substitutions:
MF	13	Fátima Pinto	(substituted on) 67'
FW	16	Diana Silva	(substituted on) 84'
Manager:
Francisco Neto

GK	1	Andreea Părăluță
RB	2	Andreea Corduneanu	(yellow card) 45'
CB	3	Lidia Havriștiuc
CB	6	Maria Ficzay
LB	15	Olivia Oprea		(substituted off) 73'
CM	4	Ioana Bortan
CM	8	Ștefania Vătafu	(yellow card) 80'
RW	7	Raluca Sârghe		(substituted off) 56'
LW	10	Andreea Voicu
CF	14	Alexandra Lunca		(substituted off) 66'
CF	11	Florentina Spânu (c)
Substitutions:
FW	18	Mihaela Ciolacu		(substituted on) 56'
FW	9	Laura Rus		(substituted on) 66'
MF	5	Adina Giurgiu		(substituted on) 73'
Manager:
Mirel Albon

Assistant referees:
Judit Kulcsár (Hungary)
Brigitta Makkosne Petz (Hungary)
Fourth official:
Gyöngyi Gaál (Hungary)

== Second leg ==
25 October 2016
17:00

Romania	1–1 (a.e.t.)	Portugal
Rus 111'	Report	Norton 105+1'

Stadionul Dr. Constantin Rădulescu, Cluj-Napoca
Attendance: 7,110
Referee: Kateryna Monzul (Ukraine)

Romania	Portugal

GK	1	Andreea Părăluță
RB	15	Olivia Oprea
CB	3	Lidia Havriștiuc	(yellow card) 43'
CB	6	Maria Ficzay
LB	11	Florentina Spânu (c)
CM	8	Ștefania Vătafu
CM	4	Ioana Bortan	(yellow card) 108'
AM	10	Andreea Voicu
RF	5	Adina Giurgiu		(substituted off) 85'
CF	18	Mihaela Ciolacu		(substituted off) 70'
LF	14	Alexandra Lunca	(yellow card) 75'
Substitutions:
MF	17	Mara Bâtea		(substituted on) 70'	(substituted off) 110'
FW	9	Laura Rus		(substituted on) 85'
MF	7	Raluca Sârghe		(substituted on) 110'
Manager:
Mirel Albon

GK	12	Patrícia Morais
RB	5	Matilde Fidalgo
CB	4	Sílvia Rebelo	(yellow card) 74'
CB	15	Carole Costa
LB	9	Ana Borges
DM	14	Dolores Silva
CM	20	Suzane Pires
CM	19	Amanda DaCosta		(substituted off) 46'
AM	18	Carolina Mendes		(substituted off) 63'
CF	10	Ana Leite		(substituted off) 78'
CF	7	Cláudia Neto (c)	(yellow card) 108'
Substitutions:
MF	13	Fátima Pinto		(substituted on) 46'
FW	16	Diana Silva	(yellow card) 120'	(substituted on) 63'
FW	8	Andreia Norton		(substituted on) 78'
Manager:
Francisco Neto

Assistant referees:
Natalia Rachynska (Ukraine)
Maryna Striletska (Ukraine)
Fourth official:
Stéphanie Frappart (France)
