= UEFA Women's Euro 2017 qualifying Group 3 =

Football tournament qualification stage

Group 3 of the UEFA Women's Euro 2017 qualifying competition consisted of five teams: France, Ukraine, Romania, Greece, and Albania. The composition of the eight groups in the qualifying group stage was decided by the draw held on 20 April 2015.

The group was played in home-and-away round-robin format. The group winners qualified directly for the final tournament, while the runners-up also qualified directly if they were one of the six best runners-up among all eight groups (not counting results against the fifth-placed team); otherwise, the runners-up advance to the play-offs.

== Standings ==
Pos	Team	Pld	W	D	L	GF	GA	GD	Pts	Qualification	France	Romania	Ukraine	Greece	Albania
1	France	8	8	0	0	27	0	+27	24	Final tournament	—	3–0	4–0	1–0	6–0
2	Romania	8	5	1	2	17	8	+9	16	Play-offs	0–1	—	2–1	4–0	3–0
3	Ukraine	8	4	1	3	14	12	+2	13		0–3	2–2	—	2–0	2–0
4	Greece	8	2	0	6	9	19	−10	6		0–3	1–3	1–3	—	3–2
5	Albania	8	0	0	8	3	31	−28	0		0–6	0–3	0–4	1–4	—

Source: UEFA
Rules for classification: Qualification tiebreakers

== Matches ==
Times are CEST (UTC+2) for dates between 29 March and 24 October 2015 and between 27 March and 29 October 2016, for other dates times are CET (UTC+1).

22 September 2015
21:00

France	3–0	Romania
Delie 16'; Le Sommer 35', 48'	Report

MMArena, Le Mans
Attendance: 7,761
Referee: Silvia Spinelli (Italy)

22 October 2015
14:00

Albania	1–4	Greece
Kurbogaj 23'	Report	Zani 14' (o.g.); Kydonaki 27'; Sidira 37'; Markou 90+2'

Loni Papuçiu Stadium, Fier
Attendance: 1,000
Referee: Zuzana Štrpková (Slovakia)
22 October 2015
18:00

Ukraine	2–2	Romania
Andrushchak 63'; Romanenko 71'	Report	Voicu 13'; Giurgiu 82'

Arena Lviv, Lviv
Attendance: 3,484
Referee: Amy Rayner (England)

27 October 2015
15:00

Romania	3–0	Albania
Lunca 9'; Corduneanu 24'; Giurgiu 74'	Report

Stadionul Mogoșoaia, Mogoșoaia
Attendance: 100
Referee: Ana Minić (Serbia)
27 October 2015
21:00

Ukraine	0–3	France
	Report	Delie 42'; Bussaglia 59'; Majri 68'

Arena Lviv, Lviv
Attendance: 732
Referee: Esther Staubli (Switzerland)

27 November 2015
14:00

Greece	1–3	Romania
Sarri 65'	Report	Rus 10'; Voicu 45+1'; Spânu 90+1'

Katerini Stadium, Katerini
Attendance: 303
Referee: Irina Turovskaya (Belarus)
27 November 2015
21:00

Albania	0–6	France
	Report	Houara 12', 15'; Le Sommer 25', 81'; Le Bihan 63', 73'

Qemal Stafa Stadium, Tirana
Attendance: 350
Referee: Vera Opeykina (Russia)

1 December 2015
18:45

Greece	0–3	France
	Report	Bilbault 12'; Le Bihan 72'; Le Sommer 75'

Katerini Stadium, Katerini
Attendance: 511
Referee: Vivian Peeters (Netherlands)

26 January 2016
13:00

Greece	3–2	Albania
Sidira 6' (pen.); Koggouli 10'; Panteliadou 15'	Report	Velaj 26'; Hashani 41'

Trikala Municipal Stadium, Trikala
Attendance: 2,031
Referee: Virginie Derouaux (Belgium)

4 March 2016
14:30

Albania	0–4	Ukraine
	Report	Apanaschenko 14' (pen.); Kozyrenko 30'; Bajraktari 67' (o.g.); Kravets 84'

Elbasan Arena, Elbasan
Attendance: 100
Referee: Elia Martínez (Spain)

8 March 2016
13:30

Greece	1–3	Ukraine
Kravets 64' (o.g.)	Report	Apanaschenko 31' (pen.); Kalinina 68'; Boychenko 80'

Acharnes Stadium, Athens
Attendance: 304
Referee: Karolina Radzik-Johan (Poland)

8 April 2016
17:00

Ukraine	2–0	Albania
Apanaschenko 15', 74' (pen.)	Report

Arena Lviv, Lviv
Attendance: 2,484
Referee: Tanja Subotič (Slovenia)
8 April 2016
19:00

Romania	0–1	France
	Report	Bussaglia 16' (pen.)

Stadionul Nicolae Dobrin, Pitești
Attendance: 713
Referee: Sara Persson (Sweden)

11 April 2016
21:00

France	4–0	Ukraine
Hamraoui 8'; Abily 27'; Vasylyuk 60' (o.g.); Majri 89'	Report

Stade du Hainaut, Valenciennes
Attendance: 15,028
Referee: Eszter Urban (Hungary)

2 June 2016
17:00

Albania	0–3	Romania
	Report	Vătafu 43', 67', 77'

Elbasan Arena, Elbasan
Attendance: 150
Referee: Lois Otte (Belgium)

3 June 2016
21:00

France	1–0	Greece
Le Sommer 36'	Report

Roazhon Park, Rennes
Attendance: 24,835
Referee: Esther Azzopardi (Malta)

7 June 2016
18:00

Ukraine	2–0	Greece
Apanaschenko 2' (pen.); Boychenko 44'	Report

Arena Lviv, Lviv
Attendance: 3,102
Referee: Linn Andersson (Sweden)

15 September 2016
17:00

Romania	2–1	Ukraine
Havriștiuc 4'; Dușa 11'	Report	Ovdiychuk 8'

Stadionul Dr. Constantin Rădulescu, Cluj-Napoca
Attendance: 1,538
Referee: Bibiana Steinhaus (Germany)

20 September 2016
19:00

Romania	4–0	Greece
Lunca 5'; Ficzay 15'; Vătafu 76'; Bâtea 79'	Report

Stadionul Dr. Constantin Rădulescu, Cluj-Napoca
Attendance: 1,264
Referee: Esther Staubli (Switzerland)
20 September 2016
21:00

France	6–0	Albania
Le Bihan 18'; Hamraoui 21', 60'; Le Sommer 45+1', 64' (pen.); Delie 77'	Report

Stade Jean-Bouin, Paris
Attendance: 7,521
Referee: Elvira Nurmustafina (Kazakhstan)

== Goalscorers ==
8 goals

- (France) Eugénie Le Sommer

5 goals

- (Ukraine) Daryna Apanaschenko

4 goals

- (France) Clarisse Le Bihan
- (Romania) Ștefania Vătafu

3 goals

- (France) Marie-Laure Delie
- (France) Kheira Hamraoui

2 goals

- (France) Élise Bussaglia
- (France) Jessica Houara
- (France) Amel Majri
- (Greece) Danai-Eleni Sidira
- (Romania) Adina Giurgiu
- (Romania) Alexandra Lunca
- (Romania) Andreea Voicu
- (Ukraine) Olha Boychenko

1 goal

- (Albania) Saranda Hashani
- (Albania) Kujtime Kurbogaj
- (Albania) Furtuna Velaj
- (France) Camille Abily
- (France) Charlotte Bilbault
- (Greece) Sophia Koggouli
- (Greece) Vasso Kydonaki
- (Greece) Eleni Markou
- (Greece) Dimitra Panteliadou
- (Greece) Veatriki Sarri
- (Romania) Mara Bâtea
- (Romania) Andreea Corduneanu
- (Romania) Cosmina Dușa
- (Romania) Maria Ficzay
- (Romania) Lidia Havriștiuc
- (Romania) Laura Rus
- (Romania) Florentina Spânu
- (Ukraine) Iya Andrushchak
- (Ukraine) Yana Kalinina
- (Ukraine) Tetyana Kozyrenko
- (Ukraine) Darya Kravets
- (Ukraine) Olha Ovdiychuk
- (Ukraine) Tetyana Romanenko

1 own goal

- (Albania) Arbiona Bajraktari (playing against Ukraine)
- (Albania) Marigona Zani (playing against Greece)
- (Ukraine) Darya Kravets (playing against Greece)
- (Ukraine) Iryna Vasylyuk (playing against France)
