= 2015 FIFA Women's World Cup qualification – UEFA Group 2 =

Football tournament qualification stage

The 2015 FIFA Women's World Cup qualification UEFA Group 2 was a UEFA qualifying group for the 2015 FIFA Women's World Cup. The group comprised Czech Republic, Estonia, Italy, Macedonia, Romania and Spain.

The group winners qualified directly for the 2015 FIFA Women's World Cup. The four best runners-up (determined by records against the first-, third-, fourth- and fifth-placed teams only for balance between different groups) advanced to the play-offs.

== Standings ==
Pos	Team	Pld	W	D	L	GF	GA	GD	Pts	Qualification	Spain	Italy	Czech Republic	Romania	Estonia	North Macedonia
1	Spain	10	9	1	0	42	2	+40	28	Women's World Cup	—	2–0	3–2	1–0	6–0	12–0
2	Italy	10	8	1	1	48	5	+43	25	Play-offs	0–0	—	6–1	1–0	4–0	15–0
3	Czech Republic	10	4	2	4	21	18	+3	14		0–1	0–4	—	0–0	6–0	5–2
4	Romania	10	3	2	5	18	11	+7	11		0–2	1–2	0–0	—	0–3 (Note: Estonia were awarded a 3–0 win. The match originally ended 2–0 to Romania.)	6–1
5	Estonia	10	2	1	7	8	33	−25	7		0–5	1–5	1–4	0–2	—	1–1
6	Macedonia	10	0	1	9	6	74	−68	1		0–10	0–11	1–3	1–9	0–2	—

Source: UEFA
Rules for classification: Tiebreakers

== Results ==
All times are CEST (UTC+02:00) during summer and CET (UTC+01:00) during winter.

20 September 2013
15:30

Macedonia	1–9	Romania
Andonova 22' (pen.)	Report	Dușa 4', 9', 21', 53'; Sârghe 12'; Rus 49', 59', 81'; Vătafu 90+1'

Stadion Mladost, Strumica
Attendance: 300
Referee: Sharon Sluyts (Belgium)
20 September 2013
17:00

Estonia	1–5	Italy
Loo 88'	Report	Mauro 57'; Gabbiadini 68', 72'; Rosucci 70'; Bonansea 77'

A. Le Coq Arena, Tallinn
Attendance: 1,717
Referee: Séverine Zinck (France)

26 September 2013
20:30

Italy	1–0	Romania
Girelli 90+3'	Report

Stadio Rino Mercante, Bassano del Grappa
Attendance: 2,000
Referee: Monika Mularczyk (Poland)

26 October 2013
13:00

Macedonia	1–3	Czech Republic
Rochi 62'	Report	Divišová 45+2'; Voňková 60' (pen.), 73'

Stadion Mladost, Strumica
Attendance: 100
Referee: Knarik Grigoryan (Armenia)
27 October 2013
12:00

Spain	6–0	Estonia
Bermúdez 14', 58' (pen.); Torrejón 28'; Hermoso 45'; Natalia Pablos 72'; Paredes 81'	Report

Ciudad Deportiva, Collado Villalba
Attendance: 1,000
Referee: Sofia Karagiorgi (Cyprus)

30 October 2013
13:00

Macedonia	0–2	Estonia
	Report	Jekimova 8'; Loo 58'

Stadion Mladost, Strumica
Attendance: 100
Referee: Petra Chudá (Slovakia)
30 October 2013
17:00

Romania	0–0	Czech Republic
	Report

Cluj Arena, Cluj-Napoca
Attendance: 450
Referee: Jenny Palmqvist (Sweden)
31 October 2013
20:00

Spain	2–0	Italy
Bermúdez 37'; Natalia 56'	Report

Nuevo Matapiñonera, San Sebastián de los Reyes
Attendance: 1,600
Referee: Kateryna Monzul (Ukraine)

23 November 2013
12:00

Spain	1–0	Romania
García 40'	Report

Estadio El Deleite, Aranjuez
Attendance: 1,566
Referee: Katalin Kulcsár (Hungary)

27 November 2013
20:00

Spain	3–2	Czech Republic
Bermúdez 15', 45+1'; Corredera 78'	Report	L. Martínková 80'; Voňková 82'

Estadio Fernando Torres, Fuenlabrada
Attendance: 834
Referee: Paula Brady (Ireland)

13 February 2014
15:00

Italy	6–1	Czech Republic
Gabbiadini 26', 32'; Manieri 49'; Bonansea 61'; Domenichetti 64'; Panico 71'	Report	Divišová 44'

Stadio Silvio Piola, Novara
Attendance: 800
Referee: Bibiana Steinhaus (Germany)
13 February 2014
18:45

Spain	12–0	Macedonia
Boquete 4', 72'; Bermúdez 11', 46'; Hermoso 26', 70'; Vicky 44'; Natalia 59', 64', 83', 90+3', 90+4'	Report

Estadio Las Gaunas, Logroño
Attendance: 5,000
Referee: Eszter Urban (Hungary)

5 April 2014
15:30

Italy	0–0	Spain
	Report

Stadio Romeo Menti, Vicenza
Attendance: 5,400
Referee: Esther Staubli (Switzerland)

10 April 2014
14:00

Macedonia	0–10	Spain
	Report	Bermúdez 29', 30', 59'; Torrejón 33'; Pablos 45'; Jenni 45+1', 65', 73'; Calderón 62', 64'

FFM Training Centre, Skopje
Attendance: 200
Referee: Kateryna Zora (Ukraine)
10 April 2014
17:00

Romania	1–2	Italy
Vătafu 80'	Report	Panico 36'; Gabbiadini 78'

Cluj Arena, Cluj-Napoca
Attendance: 458
Referee: Morag Pirie (Scotland)

26 April 2014
16:00

Czech Republic	6–0	Estonia
Kožárová 3'; Cahynová 12'; Krejčiříková 24', 41'; Svitková 26', 72'	Report

Stadion v Městských sadech, Opava
Attendance: 642
Referee: Eleni Lampadariou (Greece)

7 May 2014
17:00

Czech Republic	0–0	Romania
	Report

Městský fotbalový stadion Miroslava Valenty, Uherské Hradiště
Attendance: 650
Referee: Pernilla Larsson (Sweden)
8 May 2014
14:00

Macedonia	0–11	Italy
	Report	Panico 5'; Girelli 9', 11', 39'; Manieri 26'; Gabbiadini 27', 43'; Bonansea 51'; Carissimi 77'; Brumana 83'; Fuselli 90+4'

FFM Training Centre, Skopje
Attendance: 300
Referee: Linn Andersson (Sweden)
8 May 2014
17:00

Estonia	0–5	Spain
	Report	Losada 21', 59'; Natalia 32', 35'; Hermoso 63'

A. Le Coq Arena, Tallinn
Attendance: 896
Referee: Amy Rayner (England)

14 June 2014
15:00

Czech Republic	0–4	Italy
	Report	Panico 13' (pen.), 18'; Gabbiadini 20'; Manieri 37'

FK Viktoria Stadion, Prague
Attendance: 650
Referee: Efthalia Mitsi (Greece)
15 June 2014
15:00

Estonia	1–1	Macedonia
Loo 3'	Report	Andonova 39'

Haapsalu linnastaadion, Haapsalu
Attendance: 140
Referee: Paula Brady (Ireland)

18 June 2014
17:30

Czech Republic	5–2	Macedonia
Cahynová 35'; Pincová 47'; Martínková 49', 80'; Hloupá 90'	Report	Andonova 48', 72'

FK Viktoria Stadion, Prague
Attendance: 450
Referee: Anastasia Pustovoitova (Russia)
19 June 2014
17:00

Estonia	0–2	Romania
	Report	Dușa 29', 38'

Haapsalu linnastaadion, Haapsalu
Attendance: 105
Referee: Leen Martens (Belgium)

20 August 2014
13:00

Estonia	1–4	Czech Republic
Aarna 72'	Report	Svitková 22', 27', 69'; Raadik 81' (o.g.)

A. Le Coq Arena, Tallinn
Attendance: 387
Referee: Yuliya Medvedeva-Keldyusheva (Kazakhstan)
21 August 2014
17:00

Romania	6–1	Macedonia
Voicu 12'; Bâtea 42'; Lunca 55', 63'; Corduneanu 90+1'; Spânu 90+4'	Report	Salihi 50'

Stadionul Mogoşoaia, Mogoșoaia
Attendance: 160
Referee: Lina Lehtovaara (Finland)

13 September 2014
16:00

Romania	0–2	Spain
	Report	Natalia 28', 59'

Stadionul Emil Alexandrescu, Iaşi
Attendance: 350
Referee: Linn Andersson (Sweden)
13 September 2014
20:00

Italy	4–0	Estonia
Bonansea 6'; Zlidnis 8' (o.g.); Cernoia 27'; Manieri 65'	Report

Stadio Silvio Piola, Vercelli
Attendance: 1,000
Referee: Katalin Kulcsár (Hungary)

17 September 2014
16:00

Czech Republic	0–1	Spain
	Report	Boquete 90+1'

Spartak Písek, Písek
Attendance: 465
Referee: Stéphanie Frappart (France)
17 September 2014
16:00

Romania	0–3 Awarded (Note: Estonia were awarded a 3–0 win after Romania fielding an ineligible player Ioana Bortan. The match originally ended 2–0 to Romania.)	Estonia
Spânu 18', 38'	Report

Stadionul Emil Alexandrescu, Iaşi
Attendance: 45
Referee: Aneliya Sinabova (Bulgaria)
17 September 2014
16:00

Italy	15–0	Macedonia
Sabatino 14', 28', 45+1', 48', 51', 76'; Camporese 22'; Panico 23', 27'; Tuttino 61'; Bonansea 62', 69', 85'; Cernoia 64'; D'Adda 72'	Report

Stadio Silvio Piola, Vercelli
Attendance: 870
Referee: Sandra Bastos (Portugal)

== Goalscorers ==
12 goals

- (Spain) Natalia Pablos

10 goals

- (Spain) Sonia Bermúdez

8 goals

- (Italy) Melania Gabbiadini

7 goals

- (Italy) Barbara Bonansea
- (Italy) Patrizia Panico
- (Spain) Jennifer Hermoso

6 goals

- (Italy) Daniela Sabatino
- (Romania) Cosmina Dușa

5 goals

- (Czech Republic) Kateřina Svitková

4 goals

- (Italy) Cristiana Girelli
- (Italy) Raffaella Manieri
- (North Macedonia) Nataša Andonova

3 goals

- (Estonia) Katrin Loo
- (Romania) Laura Rus
- (Romania) Florentina Spânu
- (Spain) Verónica Boquete
- (Spain) Victoria Losada

2 goals

- (Czech Republic) Klára Cahynová
- (Czech Republic) Petra Divišová
- (Czech Republic) Tereza Krejčiříková
- (Czech Republic) Lucie Martínková
- (Czech Republic) Lucie Voňková
- (Italy) Valentina Cernola
- (Romania) Alexandra Lunca
- (Romania) Ştefania Vătafu
- (Spain) Nagore Calderón
- (Spain) Marta Torrejón

1 goal

- (Czech Republic) Lucie Hloupá
- (Czech Republic) Tereza Kožárová
- (Czech Republic) Veronika Pincová
- (Estonia) Signy Aarna
- (Estonia) Kaidi Jekimova
- (Italy) Paola Brumana
- (Italy) Elisa Camporese
- (Italy) Marta Carissimi
- (Italy) Roberta D'Adda
- (Italy) Giulia Domenichetti
- (Italy) Silvia Fuselli
- (Italy) Ilaria Mauro
- (Italy) Martina Rosucci
- (Italy) Alessia Tuttino
- (North Macedonia) Gentjana Rochi
- (North Macedonia) Afrodita Salihi
- (Romania) Mara Bâtea
- (Romania) Andreea Corduneanu
- (Romania) Raluca Sârghe
- (Romania) Andreea Voicu
- (Spain) Marta Corredera
- (Spain) Ruth García
- (Spain) Irene Paredes

1 own goal

- (Estonia) Pille Raadik (playing against Czech Republic)
- (Estonia) Inna Zlidnis (playing against Italy)
