= Romania women's national under-19 football team =

Romania U19
- Nickname: Tricolorele (The Tricolours)
- Association: Romanian Football Federation
- Confederation: UEFA (Europe)
- Head coach: (Romania) Constantin Olariu
- Captain: Giulia Dumitru
- Top scorer: -14 Lunca
- FIFA code: ROU
First colours	Second colours	Third colours

First international
- Ukraine 4–0 Romania (Mogoșoaia, Romania, September 23, 2003)

Biggest win
- Romania 12–0 Liechtenstein (Mogoșoaia, Romania; 27 November 2024)

Biggest defeat
- Spain 9–0 Romania (Braga, Portugal; April 6, 2022)

The Romania women's national under-19 football team is the national under-19 football team of Romania and is governed by the Romanian Football Federation. In the eventuality of a World Cup qualification, the team would function as an under-20 national team.

Since February 2021, Marin Ion was appointed to Romania's women under-19 national team.

== UEFA Women's Under-19 Championship ==
Ed.	Year	Round	Position in Group	MP	W	D	L	GF	GA	Qualifying Round	Position in Group	MP	W	D	L	GF	GA
1	1998	Did not enter								Did not enter
2	(Sweden) 1999	Did not enter								Did not enter
3	(France) 2000	Did not enter								Did not enter
4	(Norway) 2001	Did not enter								Did not enter
5	(Sweden) 2002	Did not enter								Did not enter
6	(Germany) 2003	Did not enter								Did not enter
7	(Finland) 2004	Did not qualify								First	4th	3	0	0	3	2	16
8	(Hungary) 2005	Did not qualify								First/Second	3rd/4th	6	1	0	5	5	20
9	(Switzerland) 2006	Did not qualify								First/Second	3rd/4th	6	0	1	5	4	26
10	(Iceland) 2007	Did not qualify								First/Second	3rd/3rd	6	2	1	3	6	15
11	(France) 2008	Did not qualify								First/Second	3rd/4th	6	2	0	4	5	15
12	(Belarus) 2009	Did not qualify								First/Second	2nd/4th	6	2	0	4	9	26
13	(North Macedonia) 2010	Did not qualify								First	3rd	3	1	0	2	2	11
14	(Italy) 2011	Did not qualify								First	4th	3	1	0	2	4	8
15	(Turkey) 2012	Group stage	4th	3	0	1	2	1	3	First/Second	2nd/1st	6	4	1	1	14	3
16	(Wales) 2013	Did not qualify								First	3rd	3	1	0	2	3	5
17	(Norway) 2014	Did not qualify								First/Elite	2nd/3rd	6	3	0	3	12	18
18	(Israel) 2015	Did not qualify								First/Elite	2rd/4th	6	1	2	3	2	8
19	(Slovakia) 2016	Did not qualify								First	3rd	3	1	0	2	9	4
20	(Northern Ireland) 2017	Did not qualify								First	3rd	3	1	0	2	7	9
21	(Switzerland) 2018	Did not qualify								First	3rd	3	1	0	2	6	12
22	(Scotland) 2019	Did not qualify								First	4th	3	0	0	3	0	7
23	(Georgia (country)) 2020	Cancelled								First/Elite	3rd/canc.	3	1	1	1	4	8
24	(Belarus) 2021	Cancelled								Cancelled
25	(Czech Republic) 2022	Did not qualify								League B/A	1st/4th	6	3	0	3	9	20
26	(Belgium) 2023	Did not qualify								League B/A	1st/4th	6	3	0	3	13	15
27	(Lithuania) 2024	Did not qualify								League B/A	2nd/4th	6	1	2	2	5	8
28	(Poland) 2025	Did not qualify								League B/A	1st/4th	6	1	2	3	14	12
29	(Bosnia and Herzegovina) 2026	Did not qualify								League B/A	1st/TBD	5	2	1	2	8	6
28	(Hungary) 2027	To Be Determined								To Be Determined
	Total			3	0	1	2	1	3			104	32	11	60	143	241

== Results at official competitions ==
Friendly matches are not included. Win Draw Loss

Competition	No.	Date and Place	Opponent	Result	Scorers
2004 UEFA U-19 Championship
2004 UEFA Championship; First qualifying round Group B6 Romania
2004 UEFA Championship; First qualifying round Group B6 Romania	1	Sep 23, 2003 Mogoșoaia	Ukraine	0–4	
2004 UEFA Championship; First qualifying round Group B6 Romania	2	Sep 25, 2003 Mogoșoaia	Scotland	1–7	Spânu 21'
2004 UEFA Championship; First qualifying round Group B6 Romania	3	Sep 27, 2003 Mogoșoaia	England	1–5	Paşca 44'
2005 UEFA U-19 Championship
2005 UEFA Championship; First qualifying round Group 4 England
2005 UEFA Championship; First qualifying round Group 4 England	4	Sep 28, 2004 York	Wales	1–4	Cioran 34'
2005 UEFA Championship; First qualifying round Group 4 England	5	Sep 30, 2004 Halifax	England	0–3	
2005 UEFA Championship; First qualifying round Group 4 England	6	Oct 2, 2004 Leeds	Bulgaria	4–0	Pop 17', 59', Cioran 54', Rus 62'
2005 UEFA Championship; Second qualifying round Group 4 Austria
2005 UEFA Championship; Second qualifying round Group 4 Austria	7	Apr 26, 2005 Enzesfeld-Lindabrunn	Russia	0–6	
2005 UEFA Championship; Second qualifying round Group 4 Austria	8	Apr 28, 2005 Pottenstein	Austria	0–4	
2005 UEFA Championship; Second qualifying round Group 4 Austria	9	Apr 30, 2005 Enzesfeld-Lindabrunn	Serbia and Montenegro	0–3	
2006 UEFA U-19 Championship
2006 UEFA Championship; First qualifying round Group 8 North Macedonia
2006 UEFA Championship; First qualifying round Group 8 North Macedonia	10	Sep 27, 2005 Struga	Serbia and Montenegro	0–1	
2006 UEFA Championship; First qualifying round Group 8 North Macedonia	11	Sep 29, 2005 Ohrid	Netherlands	1–5	Birțoiu 63'
2006 UEFA Championship; First qualifying round Group 8 North Macedonia	12	Oct 1, 2005 Struga	North Macedonia	1–1	Stanciu 31'
2006 UEFA Championship; Second qualifying round Group 4 Romania
2006 UEFA Championship; Second qualifying round Group 4 Romania	13	Apr 25, 2006 Mogoșoaia	Denmark	0–7	
2006 UEFA Championship; Second qualifying round Group 4 Romania	14	Apr 27, 2006 Otopeni	England	2–8	Sârghe 52', Sucilă 55'
2006 UEFA Championship; Second qualifying round Group 4 Romania	15	Apr 29, 2006 Otopeni	Iceland	0–4	
2007 UEFA U-19 Championship
2007 UEFA Championship; First qualifying round Group 7 Moldova
2007 UEFA Championship; First qualifying round Group 7 Moldova	16	Sep 26, 2006 Chișinău	Wales	0–5	
2007 UEFA Championship; First qualifying round Group 7 Moldova	17	Sep 28, 2006 Chișinău	Ukraine	1–1	Ristache 19'
2007 UEFA Championship; First qualifying round Group 7 Moldova	18	Oct 1, 2006 Chișinău	Moldova	4–0	Sucilă 38', 63', Cojocaru 58', C. Buză 62'
2007 UEFA Championship; Second qualifying round Group 4 Romania
2007 UEFA Championship; Second qualifying round Group 4 Romania	19	Apr 10, 2007 Chiajna	Denmark	0–7	
2007 UEFA Championship; Second qualifying round Group 4 Romania	20	Apr 12, 2007 Mogoșoaia	Norway	0–2	
2007 UEFA Championship; Second qualifying round Group 4 Romania	21	Apr 29, 2007 Chiajna	Belgium	1–0	C. Buză 61'
2008 UEFA U-19 Championship
2008 UEFA Championship; First qualifying round Group 1 Portugal
2008 UEFA Championship; First qualifying round Group 1 Portugal	22	Sep 27, 2007 Luso, Mealhada	Iceland	0–4	
2008 UEFA Championship; First qualifying round Group 1 Portugal	23	Sep 29, 2007 Águeda	Portugal	2–0	Birțoiu 44', Gurz 54'
2008 UEFA Championship; First qualifying round Group 1 Portugal	24	Sep 27, 2007 Anadia	Greece	0–1	
2008 UEFA Championship; Second qualifying round Group 3 Romania
2008 UEFA Championship; Second qualifying round Group 3 Romania	25	Apr 24, 2008 Buftea	Hungary	3–2	Birțoiu 14', 88', Ilinca 35'
2008 UEFA Championship; Second qualifying round Group 3 Romania	26	Apr 26, 2008 Mogoșoaia	Germany	0–4	
2008 UEFA Championship; Second qualifying round Group 3 Romania	27	Apr 29, 2008 Buftea	Russia	0–4	
2009 UEFA U-19 Championship
2009 UEFA Championship; First qualifying round Group 1 Portugal
2009 UEFA Championship; First qualifying round Group 1 Portugal	28	Sep 26, 2008 Penalva do Castelo	Portugal	4–1	Dușa 8', 36', Gheorghiulescu 59', Loghin 65'
2009 UEFA Championship; First qualifying round Group 1 Portugal	29	Sep 28, 2008 Viseu	Norway	0–6	
2009 UEFA Championship; First qualifying round Group 1 Portugal	30	Oct 1, 2008 Mangualde	Faroe Islands	4–1	Dușa 28', 52', Gurz 75', 85'
2009 UEFA Championship; Second qualifying round Group 5 Switzerland
2009 UEFA Championship; Second qualifying round Group 5 Switzerland	31	Apr 23, 2009 Buochs	Netherlands	0–8	
2009 UEFA Championship; Second qualifying round Group 5 Switzerland	32	Apr 25, 2009 Altbüron	Italy	0–4	
2009 UEFA Championship; Second qualifying round Group 5 Switzerland	33	Apr 28, 2009 Buochs	Switzerland	1–6	Dușa (?)
2010 UEFA U-19 Championship
2010 UEFA Championship; First qualifying round Group 11 Portugal
2010 UEFA Championship; First qualifying round Group 11 Portugal	34	Sep 19, 2009 Albufeira	Switzerland	0–5	
2010 UEFA Championship; First qualifying round Group 11 Portugal	35	Sep 21, 2009 Lagos	Portugal	2–1	Loghin 55', Gurz 19'
2010 UEFA Championship; First qualifying round Group 11 Portugal	36	Sep 24, 2009 Lagos	Iceland	0–5	
2011 UEFA U-19 Championship
2011 UEFA Championship; First qualifying round Group 9 Czech Republic
2011 UEFA Championship; First qualifying round Group 9 Czech Republic	37	Sep 11, 2010 Prague	Turkey	3–2	Vătafu 52', 60' (pen.), Herczeg 55'
2011 UEFA Championship; First qualifying round Group 9 Czech Republic	38	Sep 13, 2010 Prague	Northern Ireland	1–2	Vătafu 12'
2011 UEFA Championship; First qualifying round Group 9 Czech Republic	39	Sep 16, 2010 Prague	Czech Republic	0–4	
2012 UEFA U-19 Championship
2012 UEFA Championship; First qualifying round Group 9 Belgium
2012 UEFA Championship; First qualifying round Group 9 Belgium	40	Sep 17, 2011 Wilrijk, Antwerp	Lithuania	7–0	Lunca 5', 46', 50', 54', 60', 65', Vătafu 89' (pen.)
2012 UEFA Championship; First qualifying round Group 9 Belgium	41	Sep 19, 2011 Hoboken, Antwerp	Northern Ireland	3–0	Lunca 15', 62', 84'
2012 UEFA Championship; First qualifying round Group 9 Belgium	42	Sep 22, 2011 Wilrijk, Antwerp	Belgium	0–2	
2012 UEFA Championship; Second qualifying round Group 3 Netherlands
2012 UEFA Championship; Second qualifying round Group 3 Netherlands	43	Mar 31, 2012 Nuenen	France	1–0	Herczeg 81'
2012 UEFA Championship; Second qualifying round Group 3 Netherlands	44	Apr 2, 2012 Werkendam	Iceland	2–0	Herczeg 3', Vătafu 75'
2012 UEFA Championship; Second qualifying round Group 3 Netherlands	45	Apr 5, 2012 Nuenen	Netherlands	1–1	Lunca 44'
2012 UEFA Championship; Final tournament Group A Turkey
2012 UEFA Championship; Final tournament Group A Turkey	46	Jul 2, 2012 Lara, Antalya	Denmark	0–1	
2012 UEFA Championship; Final tournament Group A Turkey	47	Jul 5, 2012 Aksu	Portugal	0–1	
2012 UEFA Championship; Final tournament Group A Turkey	48	Jul 8, 2012 Antalya	Turkey	1–1	Bâtea 51'
2013 UEFA U-19 Championship
2013 UEFA Championship; First qualifying round Group 10 Switzerland
2013 UEFA Championship; First qualifying round Group 10 Switzerland	49	Oct 20, 2012 Kriens	Lithuania	1–4	Lunca 27'
2013 UEFA Championship; First qualifying round Group 10 Switzerland	50	Oct 22, 2012 Weggis	Switzerland	0–1	
2013 UEFA Championship; First qualifying round Group 10 Switzerland	51	Oct 25, 2012 Weggis	Israel	2–0	Lunca 36', Dicu 74'
2014 UEFA U-19 Championship
2014 UEFA Championship; Qualifying round Group 8 North Macedonia
2014 UEFA Championship; Qualifying round Group 8 North Macedonia	52	Sep 21, 2013 Strumica	Georgia	5–2	Deca 20', 45+2', 88', Gangal 62', Bistrian 86'
2014 UEFA Championship; Qualifying round Group 8 North Macedonia	53	Sep 23, 2013 Strumica	North Macedonia	3–1	Roca 32' (pen.), Deca 58' (pen.), 88'
2014 UEFA Championship; Qualifying round Group 8 North Macedonia	54	Sep 26, 2013 Strumica	Scotland	0–8	
2014 UEFA Championship; Elite round Group 3 France
2014 UEFA Championship; Elite round Group 3 France	55	Apr 5, 2014 Trélissac	France	1–5	Obreja 90'
2014 UEFA Championship; Elite round Group 3 France	56	Apr 7, 2014 Bergerac	Sweden	0–1	
2014 UEFA Championship; Elite round Group 3 France	57	Apr 10, 2014 Bergerac	Poland	3–1	Lunca 5', 84', Ciolacu 35'
2015 UEFA U-19 Championship
2015 UEFA Championship; Qualifying round Group 7 Bosnia and Herzegovina
2015 UEFA Championship; Qualifying round Group 7 Bosnia and Herzegovina	58	Sep 13, 2014 Sarajevo	Malta	0–0	
2015 UEFA Championship; Qualifying round Group 7 Bosnia and Herzegovina	59	Sep 15, 2014 Sarajevo	Bosnia and Herzegovina	1–1	Bistrian 90+5'
2015 UEFA Championship; Qualifying round Group 7 Bosnia and Herzegovina	60	Sep 18, 2014 Sarajevo	Czech Republic	1–0	Bistrian 34'
2015 UEFA Championship; Elite round Group 3 France
2015 UEFA Championship; Elite round Group 3 France	61	Apr 4, 2015 Ozoir-la-Ferrière	Russia	0–2	
2015 UEFA Championship; Elite round Group 3 France	62	Apr 6, 2015 Ozoir-la-Ferrière	France	0–2	
2015 UEFA Championship; Elite round Group 3 France	63	Apr 9, 2015 Ozoir-la-Ferrière	Iceland	0–3	
2016 UEFA U-19 Championship
2016 UEFA Championship; Qualifying round Group 9 Belarus
2016 UEFA Championship; Qualifying round Group 9 Belarus	64	Sep 15, 2015 Mogilev	Latvia	8–0	Ciolacu 17', 44', 58', Vasile 25', 30', Ambruș 34', Popa 54', Barabași 82' (pen.)
2016 UEFA Championship; Qualifying round Group 9 Belarus	65	Sep 17, 2015 Orsha	Belarus	1–3	Popa 63'
2016 UEFA Championship; Qualifying round Group 9 Belarus	66	Sep 20, 2015 Mogilev	Denmark	0–1	
2017 UEFA U-19 Championship
2017 UEFA Championship; Qualifying round Group 1 Poland
2017 UEFA Championship; Qualifying round Group 1 Poland	67	Sep 15, 2016 Wronki	Poland	0–2	
2017 UEFA Championship; Qualifying round Group 1 Poland	68	Sep 17, 2016 Grodzisk Wielkopolski	Armenia	7–0	Bartalis 23', Petre 31', Ambruș 40', Ciolacu 51', 72', A. Boroș 63', 75'
2017 UEFA Championship; Qualifying round Group 1 Poland	69	Sep 20, 2016 Grodzisk Wielkopolski	Norway	0–7	
2018 UEFA U-19 Championship
2018 UEFA Championship; Qualifying round Group 3 Lithuania
2018 UEFA Championship; Qualifying round Group 3 Lithuania	70	Sep 8, 2017 Marijampolė	Slovakia	2–3	Predoi 35', M. Boroș 66'
2018 UEFA Championship; Qualifying round Group 3 Lithuania	71	Sep 11, 2017 Alytus	Lithuania	4–1	M. Boroș 12', 20', 68' (pen.), Piperea 70'
2018 UEFA Championship; Qualifying round Group 3 Lithuania	72	Sep 14, 2017 Marijampolė	Denmark	0–8	
2019 UEFA U-19 Championship
2019 UEFA Championship; Qualifying round Group 11 Bulgaria
2019 UEFA Championship; Qualifying round Group 11 Bulgaria	73	Oct 1, 2018 Albena	Portugal	0–2	
2019 UEFA Championship; Qualifying round Group 11 Bulgaria	74	Oct 4, 2018 Albena	Italy	0–4	
2019 UEFA Championship; Qualifying round Group 11 Bulgaria	75	Oct 7, 2018 Balchik	Bulgaria	0–1	
2020 UEFA U-19 Championship
2020 UEFA Championship; Qualifying round Group 1 North Macedonia
2020 UEFA Championship; Qualifying round Group 1 North Macedonia	76	Oct 1, 2019 Skopje	Slovakia	1–1	Tătar 81' (pen.)
2020 UEFA Championship; Qualifying round Group 1 North Macedonia	77	Oct 4, 2019 Skopje	France	0–7	
2020 UEFA Championship; Qualifying round Group 1 North Macedonia	78	Oct 7, 2019 Skopje	North Macedonia	3–0	Ienovan 6', Benő 49', Marcu 77'
2020 UEFA Championship; Elite round Group 1 Netherlands
2020 UEFA Championship; Elite round Group 1 Netherlands	–	Apr 8, 2020 Oldenzaal	Netherlands	canc.	
2020 UEFA Championship; Elite round Group 1 Netherlands	–	Apr 11, 2020 Oldenzaal	Scotland	canc.	
2020 UEFA Championship; Elite round Group 1 Netherlands	–	Apr 14, 2020 Vriezenveen	Iceland	canc.	
2021 UEFA U-19 Championship
2021 UEFA Championship; Qualifying round Group 1 Portugal
2021 UEFA Championship; Qualifying round Group 1 Portugal	–	Apr 7, 2021	Portugal	canc.	
2021 UEFA Championship; Qualifying round Group 1 Portugal	–	Apr 10, 2021	Czech Republic	canc.	
2021 UEFA Championship; Qualifying round Group 1 Portugal	–	Apr 13, 2021	Latvia	canc.	
2022 UEFA U-19 Championship
2022 UEFA Championship; Qualifying round Group B4 Malta
2022 UEFA Championship; Qualifying round Group B4 Malta	79	Oct 20, 2021 Ta' Qali, Attard	Georgia	2–1	A. Borodi 37', Bălăceanu 60'
2022 UEFA Championship; Qualifying round Group B4 Malta	80	Oct 23, 2021 Ta' Qali, Attard	Malta	5–2	Bumbar 5', Botojel 14' (pen.), Bălăceanu 32', A. Borodi 51', Frîncu 52'
2022 UEFA Championship; Qualifying round Group B4 Malta	81	Oct 26, 2021 Ta' Qali, Attard	Israel	1–0	Pînzariu 20'
2022 UEFA Championship; Qualifying round Group A6 Portugal
2022 UEFA Championship; Qualifying round Group A6 Portugal	82	Apr 6, 2022 Fão, Esposende	Spain	0–9	
2022 UEFA Championship; Qualifying round Group A6 Portugal	83	Apr 9, 2022 Fafe	Netherlands	0–5	
2022 UEFA Championship; Qualifying round Group A6 Portugal	84	Apr 12, 2022 Braga	Portugal	1–3	Bălăceanu 20'

== Top goalscorers in the European Championships ==
As of 12 April 2022.

No.	Name	Goals
1	Alexandra Lunca	14
2	Mihaela Ciolacu	6
3	Cosmina Dușa	5
4	Georgiana Birțoiu	4
4	Daniela Gurz	4
4	Ștefania Vătafu	4
4	Nicoleta Deca	4
4	Mădălina Boroș	4
9	Cristina Sucilă	3
9	Andrea Herczeg	3
9	Claudia Bistrian	3
9	Ioana Bălăceanu	3

== Results and fixtures ==
26 November 2025	Romania	6–0	San Marino	Ugljevik City Stadium, Ugljevik
13:00	Szoke 24', 51', 53'; Ouatu 44' (pen.); Olah 47', 61'	Report		Referee: Katalin Sipos (Hungary)

29 November 2025	Romania	2–1	Bosnia and Herzegovina	Ugljevik City Stadium, Ugljevik
13:00	Niculescu 34'; Olah 87'	Report	Jurić 85'	Referee: Teresa Oliveira (Portugal)

2 December 2025	Ukraine	0–0	Romania	Ugljevik City Stadium, Ugljevik
13:00		Report		Referee: Teresa Oliveira (Portugal)

28 February 2025	Malta	0–5	Romania	Centenary Stadium, Ta' Qali
11:00		Report	Szoke 20'; Ouatu 36'; Bartolo 70' (o.g.); Olah 83'; Kara-Jouli 86'

2 March 2026	Malta	1–8	Romania	Centenary Stadium, Ta' Qali
14:00	Francalanza 84'	Report	Kara-Jouli 14', 51', 55'; Olah 21'; Cicoș 64'; Szoke 80'; Borțea 82'; Ivan 89'

12 April 2026	Poland	4–0	Romania	Stadion Miejski, Gniezno
11:00	Zwiazek 15'; Zgoda 49'; Zielińska 79'; Rogus 90'	Report		Referee: Minka Vekkeli (Finland)

15 April 2026	Greece	1–0	Romania	Sredzkie Centrum Sportu, Sroda Wielkopolska
14:00	Argyriou 67'	Report		Referee: Karoline Marie Jensen (Norway)

18 April 2026	Romania	0–1	Belgium	Sredzkie Centrum Sportu, Sroda Wielkopolska
11:00		Report	Hens 90+3'	Referee: Minka Vekkeli (Finland)

4 June 2026 Friendly	Slovakia	3–2	Romania	MOL football Academy, Dunajská Streda
18:00	Michalikova 18'; Krajanova 79'; Melicharek 87'	Report	Răducu 2'; Glatter 17'

6 June 2026 Friendly	Slovakia	0–1	Romania	NTC Senec, Senec
13:00		Report	Niculescu 90'

== Coaching staff ==
=== Current coaching staff ===
Role	Name
Head coach	Constantin Olariu
Assistant coach	
Goalkeeping coach	
Physical coach	
