= Roxana Oprea =

Romanian footballer

Personal information
- Full name: Roxana Mihaela Oprea
- Date of birth: 4 December 1988 (age 37)
- Position: Goalkeeper

Senior career*
Years	Team	Apps	(Gls)
2014–2015	Amazones Dramas		
2015–2016	St. Pölten		
2016–2017	Olimpia Cluj		

International career^{‡}
2005–200?	Romania U19	12	(0)
200?–2016	Romania	8	(0)
- * Club domestic league appearances and goals ‡ National team caps and goals as of 20 January 2017

Roxana Mihaela Oprea (born 4 December 1988) is a Romanian footballer who plays as a goalkeeper. She has been a member of the Romania women's national team.
