= Petrești mine =

Bentonite mine in Cluj County, Romania

- Location: Mintiu Gherlii, Cluj County, Romania
- Products: Bentonite

The Petrești mine is a large mine in the northwest of Romania in Cluj County, 52 km north-east of Cluj-Napoca and 478 km northwest of the capital, Bucharest. Petrești represents one of the largest bentonite reserve in Romania having estimated reserves of 6.3 million tonnes.
