= Stine Reinås =

Norwegian footballer (born 1994)

Personal information
- Full name: Stine Pettersen Reinås
- Date of birth: 15 July 1994 (age 32)
- Place of birth: Hafslo, Norway
- Position: Defender

Team information
- Current team: Stabæk
- Number: 44

Youth career
- Hafslo
- Sogndal

Senior career*
| Years | Team | Apps | (Gls) |
| 2009–2010 | Kaupanger | | |
| 2011 | Voss | 1 | (0) |
| 2011–2012 | Kattem | 28 | (1) |
| 2013–2017 | Stabæk | 104 | (8) |
| 2018–2019 | Vålerenga | 22 | (2) |
| 2020– | Stabæk | 14 | (1) |

International career^{‡}
| 2016– | Norway | 8 | (1) |
- * Club domestic league appearances and goals as of 7 November 2020 ‡ National team caps and goals as of 13 August 2018

Stine Pettersen Reinås (born 15 July 1994) is a Norwegian football defender who currently plays for Toppserien side Stabæk.

She hails from Hafslo, and lived in Sogndal Municipality where she started her senior career in Kaupanger IL at the age of 15. Ahead of the 2011 season she signed for second-tier FBK Voss, but already in mid-2011 she moved to Trondheim and Kattem IL. Ahead of the 2013 season she went on to Stabæk. In December 2017 Reinås went to Vålerenga.

In 2016, she made her debut for the Norway women's national football team, scoring one goal in the 10–0 victory over Kazakhstan.

== International goals ==
| No. | Date | Venue | Opponent | Score | Result | Competition |
|---|---|---|---|---|---|---|
| 1. | 15 september 2016 | Aker Stadion, Molde, Norway | Kazakhstan | 4–0 | 10–0 | 2017 UEFA Women's Euro qualifying |
