= Darya Kravets =

Ukrainian footballer

Darya Kravets Дар'я Кравець (Ukrainian)
Personal information
- Full name: Darya Dmytrivna Kravets
- Date of birth: 21 March 1994 (age 32)
- Place of birth: Donetsk, Ukraine
- Height: 1.78 m (5 ft 10 in)
- Position: Defender

Senior career*
Years	Team	Apps	(Gls)
2012–2014	Lehenda Chernihiv	11	(0)
2014–2015	Mordovochka Saransk	13	(0)
2015–2016	FC Zorky Krasnogorsk	14	(0)
2016–2019	BIIK Kazygurt	41	(5)
2019–2021	Reims	25	(1)
2021–2022	Fiorentina	21	(0)
2022–2023	Como	16	(0)
2024	Beylerbeyi	6	(0)
2024–	Mura	1	(0)

International career^{‡}
2009–2010	Ukraine U17	6	(0)
2010–2013	Ukraine U19	12	(3)
2014–	Ukraine	56	(6)
- * Club domestic league appearances and goals as of 12:18, 22 March 2021 (UTC) ‡ National team caps and goals as of 27 August 2022

Darya Dmytrivna Kravets (Ukrainian: Дар'я Дмитрівна Кравець, born 21 March 1994) is a Ukrainian professional footballer who played for Serie A club FC Como Women and the Ukraine women's national team. She previously played in France for Reims, in Russia for Mordovochka Saransk, FC Zorky Krasnogorsk, and in Kazakhstan for BIIK Kazygurt.

== Club career ==
Darya started with another sport, road cycling, at the age of nine. While she continued to practice the discipline in competition, even winning a podium in a national championship, she finally chose football at the age of 14 and made her debut for Lehenda Chernihiv. In 2014, she joined the women's team of the Russian club FC Mordovia Saransk. She played her first match in the Russian Premier League on April 13, 2014, against the club Ryazan-VDV. The following year she joined FC Zorky Krasnogorsk and finished at the third position of the Russian Women's Football Championship.

In 2016 she joined the club BIIK Kazygurt in Kazakhstan. Darya participates in the Champions League with BIIK Kazygurt and in the 2018–2019 season faces and beats Barcelona 3–1 in the round of 16.

Darya Kravets joined France in the summer 2019 by signing at the Stade de Reims, for the club's return among the elite in D1 Féminine. In 2022 she moved to Como in Italy. In 2023, she attempted to enter the Russian Federation when incriminating material was found on her phone.

== International career ==
She made her debut for the Ukraine national team WU-17 on October 21, 2010, in the winning (6–1) home game of the WU-17 European Championship first qualifying round against Kazakhstan. She made her debut for the Ukraine women's national team on September 13, 2014, in the winning World Cup (8–0) home qualifying match against Turkey.

== International goals ==
No.	Date	Venue	Opponent	Score	Result	Competition
1.	4 March 2016	Elbasan Arena, Elbasan, Albania	Albania	4–0	4–0	UEFA Women's Euro 2017 qualifying
2.	2 March 2018	Gold City, Alanya, Turkey	Kosovo	2–0	2–0	2018 Turkish Women's Cup
3.	4 September 2018	Ternopilsky Misky Stadion, Ternopil, Ukraine	Hungary	1–0	2–0	2019 FIFA Women's World Cup qualification
4.	22 September 2020	Obolon Arena, Kyiv, Ukraine	Greece	3–0	4–0	UEFA Women's Euro 2022 qualifying
5.	27 October 2020	Leoforos Alexandras Stadium, Athens, Greece	Greece	2–0	4–0	UEFA Women's Euro 2022 qualifying
6.	27 October 2020	Leoforos Alexandras Stadium, Athens, Greece	Greece	3–0	4–0	UEFA Women's Euro 2022 qualifying
7.	28 June 2022	Stadion Miejski w Rzeszowie, Rzeszów, Poland	Hungary	1–0	2–0	2023 FIFA Women's World Cup qualification

== Honours ==
Lehenda Chernihiv

- Ukrainian Women's Cup: 2012
- Ukrainian Women's League: runner-up 2012

Mordovia Saransk

- Russian Women's Football Championship : 3rd place 2015

BIIK Kazygurt

- Kazakhstani Championship: 2016, 2017, 2018
- Kazakhstani Cup: 2016, 2017, 2018
