= Raffaella Manieri =

Italian footballer (born 1986)

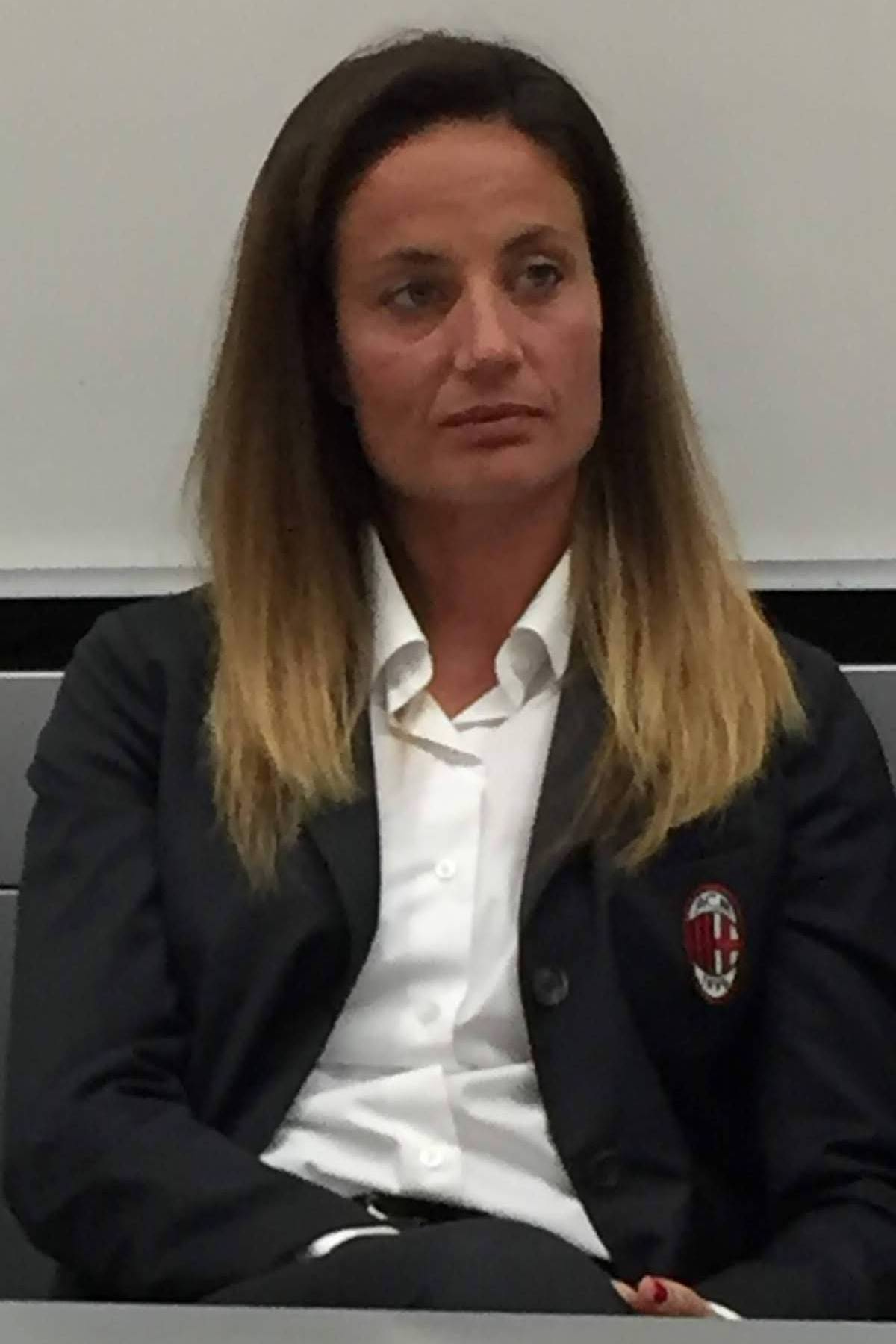
- Manieri in 2019

Personal information
- Full name: Raffaella Manieri
- Date of birth: 26 November 1986 (age 39)
- Place of birth: Pesaro, Italy
- Height: 1.72 m (5 ft 8 in)
- Position: Defender

Senior career*
| Years | Team | Apps | (Gls) |
| 2005–2006 | ACF Torino | | |
| 2007–2008 | ASD Bardolino | | |
| 2008–2013 | Torres CF | 105 | (32) |
| 2013–2016 | Bayern Munich | 37 | (1) |
| 2013–2016 | Bayern Munich II | 9 | (1) |
| 2016–2017 | ACF Brescia | 3 | (0) |
| 2017–2018 | U.S. San Zaccaria | 23 | (1) |
| 2018–2019 | Milan | 1 | (0) |

International career^{‡}
| 2007–2016 | Italy | 59 | (10) |
- * Club domestic league appearances and goals as of 29 October 2016 ‡ National team caps and goals as of 1 October 2016

Raffaella Manieri (born 26 November 1986) is an Italian footballer who played as a defender.

== Club career ==
She played for ACF Brescia Femminile, Torres CF, ACF Torino, ASD Bardolino, and Milan in Italy, and Bayern Munich in Germany.

== International career ==
Manieri is a member of the Italian national team. As an Under-19 international she scored against Nigeria in the 2004 U-19 World Championship, earning Italy its only point in the competition. In July 2007 she played her first match for the senior team against Mexico. She was included in the call-up for the 2009 European Championship as a reserve and subsequently consolidated herself in the team throughout the 2011 World Cup qualifying.

== Career statistics ==
=== International ===
Scores and results list Italy's goal tally first, score column indicates score after each Manieri goal.

List of international goals scored by Raffaella Manieri
| No. | Date | Venue | Opponent | Score | Result | Competition | Ref. |
|---|---|---|---|---|---|---|---|
| | June 16, 2012 | Turin | Macedonia | 1–0 | 9–0 | UEFA Women's Euro 2013 qualifying | |
| | June 16, 2012 | Turin | Macedonia | 3–0 | 9–0 | UEFA Women's Euro 2013 qualifying | |
| | February 13, 2014 | Novara | Czech Republic | 3–1 | 6–1 | 2015 FIFA Women's World Cup qualification | |
| | May 8, 2014 | Skopje | Macedonia | 4–0 | 11–0 | 2015 FIFA Women's World Cup qualification | |
| | June 14, 2014 | Prague | Czech Republic | 4–0 | 4–0 | 2015 FIFA Women's World Cup qualification | |
| | September 13, 2014 | Vercelli | Estonia | 4–0 | 4–0 | 2015 FIFA Women's World Cup qualification | |
| | September 18, 2015 | La Spezia | Georgia | 3–1 | 6–1 | UEFA Women's Euro 2017 qualifying | |
| | October 27, 2015 | Chomutov | Czech Republic | 2–0 | 3–0 | UEFA Women's Euro 2017 qualifying | |
| | June 7, 2016 | Gori | Georgia | 1–0 | 7–0 | UEFA Women's Euro 2017 qualifying | |

== Honours and achievements ==
Torres CF

- Serie A: 2008, 2010, 2011
- Italian Women's Cup: 2011

Bayern München

- Bundesliga: 2014–15, 2015–16
