= Mintiu Gherlii =

- Commune
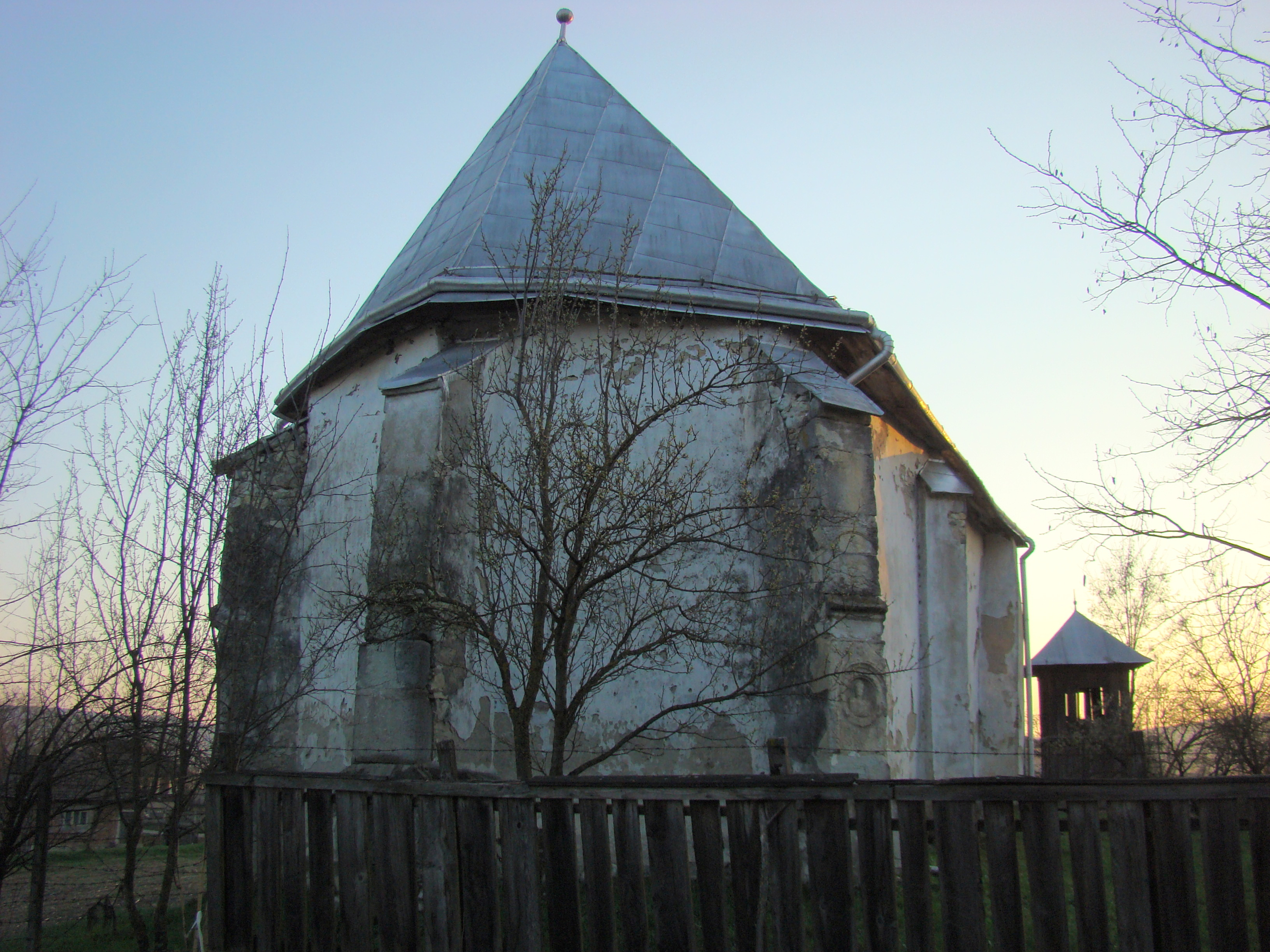
- Reformed church in Mintiu Gherlii

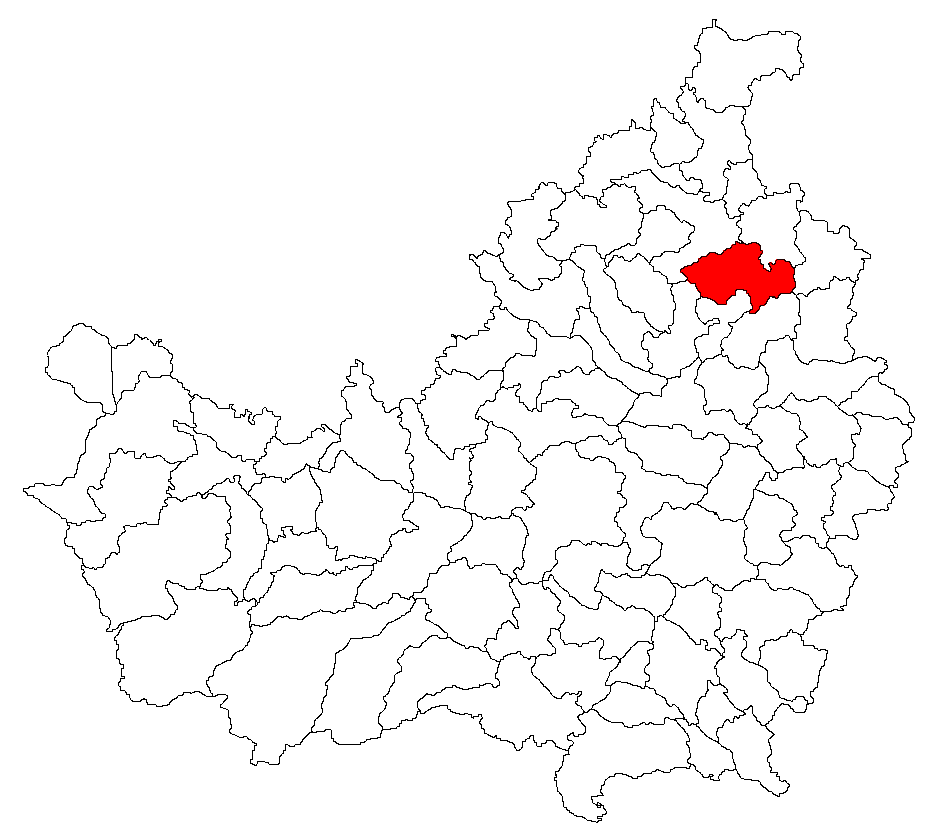
- Location in Cluj County

- Location in Romania
- Coordinates: 47°3′23″N 23°56′51″E
- Country: Romania
- County: Cluj
- Subdivisions: Bunești, Mintiu Gherlii, Nima, Pădurenii, Petrești, Salatiu

Government
  - Mayor (2020–2024): Dumitru Oltean (PNL)
- Area: 78.52 km^{2} (30.32 sq mi)
- Elevation: 260 m (850 ft)
- Population (2021-12-01): 3,598
  - Density: 45.82/km^{2} (118.7/sq mi)
- Time zone: UTC+02:00 (EET)
  - Summer (DST): UTC+03:00 (EEST)
- Postal code: 407410
- Area code: +(40) x64
- Vehicle reg.: CJ
- Website: mintiu-gherlii.ro

Mintiu Gherlii (Hungarian: Szamosújvárnémeti; German: Deutschendorf) is a commune in Cluj County, Transylvania, Romania. It is composed of six villages: Bunești (Széplak), Mintiu Gherlii, Nima (Néma), Pădurenii (Coptelke), Petrești (Péterháza), and Salatiu (Szilágytő).

== Geography ==
The commune is situated in the northwestern part of the Transylvanian Plateau, at an altitude of 260 m (850 ft), on the banks of the Someșul Mic River. It is located in northern Cluj County, on the outskirts of the city of Gherla, 13 km (8.1 mi) south of Dej and 46 km (29 mi) northeast of the county seat, Cluj-Napoca.

Mintiu Gherlii is crossed by national road DN1C, which connects Cluj-Napoca to Baia Mare and the Romania–Ukraine border at Halmeu.

== Demographics ==
According to the census from 2002 there was a total population of 3,860 people living in this commune. Of this population, 95.51% were ethnic Romanians, 3.44% ethnic Roma, and 1.03% ethnic Hungarians. At the 2011 census, there were 3,746 inhabitants, of which 91.24% were Romanians and 4.62% Roma. At the 2021 census, Mintiu Gherlii had a population of 3,598; of those, 85.91% were Romanians and 2.72% Roma.

== Natives ==
- Gheorghe Crăciun (1913 – 2001), Securitate colonel, commandant of Aiud Prison (1958–1964)
- Daniela Gurz (born 1991), footballer
- Aurelia Szőke-Tudor (1936 – 2013), handballer

== See also ==
- Petrești mine
