= Laura Rus =

Romanian footballer (born 1987)

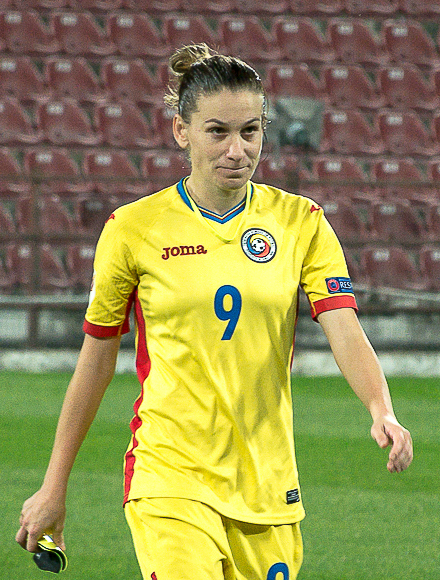

Personal information
- Full name: Laura Roxana Rus
- Date of birth: 1 October 1987 (age 39)
- Place of birth: Bocșa, Romania
- Position: Striker

Team information
- Current team: Beroe

Senior career*
Years	Team	Apps	(Gls)
2004–2007	Pandurii Targu Jiu		
2007–2010	Sporting Huelva	69	(7)
2010	Apollon Limassol		
2010–2011	Sporting Huelva	12	(5)
2011–2013	Apollon Limassol		
2013–2014	Fortuna Hjørring		
2014–2016	Icheon Daekyo WFC		
2017	Sporting Huelva	11	(4)
2017	Apollon Ladies F.C.		
2017–2018	ASD Sassuolo	13	(0)
2018–2019	Hellas Verona	14	(8)
2019–2020	RSC Anderlecht	5	(4)
2021	Tindastóll	7	(2)
2022–	Beroe	2	(2)

International career^{‡}
2005–	Romania	140	(18)
- * Club domestic league appearances and goals as of 2 February 2014 ‡ National team caps and goals as of 5 December 2023

Laura Roxana Rus (born 1 October 1987) is a Romanian footballer who plays for Apulia Trani in the Italian Women's Serie B. She has also played in the Romanian, Spanish, Danish, South Korean and Italian championships, and she is a member of the Romanian national team.

== Career ==
Rus was born in Bocșa and attended university in Reșița, where she played for the university's handball team. She started her football career playing for Pandurii Targu Jiu in the Liga I. During this time she started playing for the Romanian national team in 2005.

In 2007 she moved abroad, alternating periods in Spain's Sporting Huelva and Cyprus' Apollon Limassol. With Apollon she first played the UEFA Champions League in the 2010–11 season. In 2011, she went on trial with English FA WSL club Everton Ladies, but she ultimately continued in Apollon for two more seasons. In the latter she was the top scorer of the Champions League with 11 goals (with the qualifying rounds included). That summer she moved to Fortuna Hjørring in Denmark's Elitedivisionen, and one year later to South Korea's Icheon Daekyo.

In 2017 she moved back to Spain and Cyprus for third stints with Sporting and Apollon. At the end of 2017 it was announced that she will move to Italy and play for Sassuolo. After the end of the 2017–2018 season, she signed with Hellas Verona, scoring in her first friendly match. At the end of July 2019, Laura signed with RSC Anderlecht, where she will play for the 2019–20 season.

Goals for the Romanian WNT in official competitions
Competition	Stage	Date	Location	Opponent	Goals	Result	Overall
2009 UEFA Euro	Qualifiers	2006–11–23	Mogoşoaia	Estonia	1	5–0	2
2009 UEFA Euro	Qualifiers	2007–05–07	Debrecen	Hungary	1	3–3	2
2011 FIFA World Cup	Qualifiers	2010–03–27	Sarajevo	Bosnia and Herzegovina	1	5–0	1
2013 UEFA Euro	Qualifiers	2011–09–17	Shymkent	Kazakhstan	1	3–0	7
2013 UEFA Euro	Qualifiers	2011–10–27	Bucharest	Turkey	2	7–1	7
2013 UEFA Euro	Qualifiers	2011–11–23	İzmir	Turkey	1	2–1	7
2013 UEFA Euro	Qualifiers	2012–06–21	Buftea	Switzerland	3	4–2	7
2015 FIFA World Cup	Qualifiers	2013–09–20	Strumica	North Macedonia	1	9–1	1
2017 UEFA Euro	Qualifiers	2015–11–27	Katerini	Greece	1	3–1	1
2019 FIFA World Cup	Qualifiers	2017–10–20	Leuven	Belgium	1	2–3	1

== International goals ==
No.	Date	Venue	Opponent	Score	Result	Competition
1.	23 November 2006	Mogoşoaia, Romania	Estonia	5–0	5–0	UEFA Women's Euro 2009 qualifying
2.	5 May 2007	Debrecen, Hungary	Hungary	2–0	3–3	UEFA Women's Euro 2009 qualifying
3.	24 February 2010	Lagos, Portugal	Austria	2–0	2–0	2010 Algarve Cup
4.	1 March 2010	Albufeira, Portugal	Faroe Islands	1–0	5–1	2010 Algarve Cup
5.	1 March 2010	Albufeira, Portugal	Faroe Islands	2–0	5–1	2010 Algarve Cup
6.	1 March 2010	Albufeira, Portugal	Faroe Islands	3–1	5–1	2010 Algarve Cup
7.	27 March 2010	Sarajevo, Bosnia and Herzegovina	Bosnia and Herzegovina	3–0	5–0	2011 FIFA Women's World Cup qualification
8.	17 September 2011	Shymkent, Kazakhstan	Kazakhstan	1–0	3–0	UEFA Women's Euro 2013 qualifying
9.	27 October 2011	Bucharest, Romania	Turkey	6–1	7–1	UEFA Women's Euro 2013 qualifying
10.	27 October 2011	Bucharest, Romania	Turkey	7–1	7–1	UEFA Women's Euro 2013 qualifying
11.	23 November 2011	İzmir, Turkey	Turkey	1–0	2–1	UEFA Women's Euro 2013 qualifying
12.	21 June 2012	Buftea, Romania	Switzerland	1–1	4–2	UEFA Women's Euro 2013 qualifying
13.	21 June 2012	Buftea, Romania	Switzerland	2–1	4–2	UEFA Women's Euro 2013 qualifying
14.	21 June 2012	Buftea, Romania	Switzerland	4–2	4–2	UEFA Women's Euro 2013 qualifying
15.	20 September 2013	Strumica, North Macedonia	North Macedonia	5–1	9–1	2015 FIFA Women's World Cup qualification
16.	20 September 2013	Strumica, North Macedonia	North Macedonia	7–1	9–1	2015 FIFA Women's World Cup qualification
17.	20 September 2013	Strumica, North Macedonia	North Macedonia	8–1	9–1	2015 FIFA Women's World Cup qualification
18.	27 November 2015	Katerini, Greece	Greece	1–0	3–1	UEFA Women's Euro 2017 qualifying
19.	25 October 2016	Cluj-Napoca, Romania	Portugal	1–1	1–1 (a.e.t.)	UEFA Women's Euro 2017 qualifying play-offs
20.	10 November 2016	San Jose, United States	United States	1–3	1–8	Friendly
21.	20 October 2017	Leuven, Belgium	Belgium	2–2	2–3	2019 FIFA Women's World Cup qualification
22.	4 March 2020	Antalya, Turkey	Hong Kong	3–1	4–1	2020 Turkish Women's Cup
23.	18 September 2020	Leuven, Belgium	Belgium	1–4	1–6	UEFA Women's Euro 2022 qualifying
24.	22 September 2020	Mogoșoaia, Romania	Croatia	4–1	4–1	UEFA Women's Euro 2022 qualifying
25.	23 October 2020	Marijampolė, Lithuania	Lithuania	2–0	4–0	UEFA Women's Euro 2022 qualifying
26.	14 June 2021	Senec, Slovakia	Slovakia	1–2	1–3	Friendly
27.	17 September 2021	Mogoșoaia, Romania	Croatia	1–0	2–0	2023 FIFA Women's World Cup qualification
28.	21 September 2021	Mogoșoaia, Romania	Lithuania	2–0	3–0	2023 FIFA Women's World Cup qualification
29.	21 September 2021	Mogoșoaia, Romania	Lithuania	3–0	3–0	2023 FIFA Women's World Cup qualification
30.	2 September 2022	Vilnius, Lithuania	Lithuania	4–0	7–1	2023 FIFA Women's World Cup qualification
31.	2 September 2022	Vilnius, Lithuania	Lithuania	5–0	7–1	2023 FIFA Women's World Cup qualification
32.	16 July 2023	Bucharest, Romania	Bulgaria	1–0	2–0	Friendly
