= UEFA Women's Euro 2017 qualifying Group 8 =

Football tournament qualification stage

Group 8 of the UEFA Women's Euro 2017 qualifying competition consisted of five teams: Norway, Austria, Wales, Israel, and Kazakhstan. The composition of the eight groups in the qualifying group stage was decided by the draw held on 20 April 2015.

The group was played in home-and-away round-robin format. The group winners qualified directly for the final tournament, while the runners-up also qualified directly if they were one of the six best runners-up among all eight groups (not counting results against the fifth-placed team); otherwise, the runners-up advance to the play-offs.

== Standings ==
| Pos | Team | Pld | W | D | L | GF | GA | GD | Pts | Qualification | Norway | Austria | Wales | Kazakhstan | Israel |
|---|---|---|---|---|---|---|---|---|---|---|---|---|---|---|---|
| 1 | Norway | 8 | 7 | 1 | 0 | 29 | 2 | +27 | 22 | Final tournament | — | 2–2 | 4–0 | 10–0 | 5–0 |
| 2 | Austria | 8 | 5 | 2 | 1 | 18 | 4 | +14 | 17 | Final tournament | 0–1 | — | 3–0 | 6–1 | 4–0 |
| 3 | Wales | 8 | 3 | 2 | 3 | 13 | 11 | +2 | 11 | | 0–2 | 0–0 | — | 4–0 | 3–0 |
| 4 | Kazakhstan | 8 | 1 | 1 | 6 | 2 | 30 | −28 | 4 | | 0–4 | 0–2 | 0–4 | — | 1–0 |
| 5 | Israel | 8 | 0 | 2 | 6 | 2 | 17 | −15 | 2 | | 0–1 | 0–1 | 2–2 | 0–0 | — |

Source: UEFA
Rules for classification: Qualification tiebreakers

== Matches ==
Times are CEST (UTC+2) for dates between 29 March and 24 October 2015 and between 27 March and 29 October 2016, for other dates times are CET (UTC+1).

17 September 2015
11:00

| Kazakhstan | 0–2 | Austria |
|---|---|---|
| | Report | Billa 45+1', 89' |

BIIK Stadium, Shymkent
Attendance: 500
Referee: Gordana Kuzmanović (Serbia)

22 September 2015
10:00

| Kazakhstan | 0–4 | Norway |
|---|---|---|
| | Report | Ad. Hegerberg 19', 27'; Haavi 51', 61' |

Kazhymukan Munaitpasov Stadium, Astana
Attendance: 180
Referee: Simona Ghisletta (Switzerland)
22 September 2015
18:30

| Austria | 3–0 | Wales |
|---|---|---|
| Schiechtl 25'; Puntigam 73'; Burger 86' | Report |

NV Arena, Sankt Pölten
Attendance: 1,050
Referee: Florence Guillemin (France)

22 October 2015
18:00

| Israel | 0–0 | Kazakhstan |
|---|---|---|
| | Report |

Lod Municipal Stadium, Lod
Attendance: 100
Referee: Ivana Martinčić (Croatia)

23 October 2015
17:50

| Norway | 4–0 | Wales |
|---|---|---|
| Herlovsen 30', 71'; Ad. Hegerberg 39'; Mjelde 90+3' | Report |

Color Line Stadion, Ålesund
Attendance: 3,483
Referee: Bibiana Steinhaus (Germany)

25 October 2015
18:00

| Israel | 0–1 | Austria |
|---|---|---|
| | Report | Prohaska 48' |

Lod Municipal Stadium, Lod
Attendance: 70
Referee: Karolina Radzik-Johan (Poland)

26 November 2015
15:00

| Wales | 4–0 | Kazakhstan |
|---|---|---|
| Harding 48'; Ward 60', 62', 83' | Report |

Bridge Meadow Stadium, Haverfordwest
Attendance: 837
Referee: Tanja Subotič (Slovenia)

1 December 2015
14:00

| Israel | 2–2 | Wales |
|---|---|---|
| Falkon 25'; Shelina 83' | Report | Harding 59', 80' |

Ramat Gan Stadium, Ramat Gan
Attendance: 120
Referee: Marta Frias Acedo (Spain)

6 April 2016
16:00

| Israel | 0–1 | Norway |
|---|---|---|
| | Report | Ad. Hegerberg 25' |

Ramat Gan Stadium, Ramat Gan
Attendance: 192
Referee: Sabine Bonnin (France)
6 April 2016
18:00

| Austria | 6–1 | Kazakhstan |
|---|---|---|
| Schiechtl 13'; Billa 15', 88'; Aschauer 18'; Zadrazil 32'; Burger 36' | Report | Kirgizbaeva 79' |

Vorwärts Stadium, Steyr
Attendance: 800
Referee: Paula Brady (Republic of Ireland)

10 April 2016
16:00

| Austria | 0–1 | Norway |
|---|---|---|
| | Report | Mykjåland 23' (pen.) |

Vorwärts Stadium, Steyr
Attendance: 1,300
Referee: Lorraine Clark (Scotland)

12 April 2016
10:00

| Kazakhstan | 0–4 | Wales |
|---|---|---|
| | Report | Green 15', 23'; Ward 60' (pen.), 81' (pen.) |

BIIK Stadium, Shymkent
Attendance: 545
Referee: Tania Fernandes Morais (Luxembourg)

2 June 2016
14:00

| Kazakhstan | 1–0 | Israel |
|---|---|---|
| Yalova 69' | Report |

BIIK Stadium, Shymkent
Attendance: 550
Referee: Galiya Echeva (Bulgaria)
2 June 2016
18:05

| Norway | 2–2 | Austria |
|---|---|---|
| Mjelde 23'; Herlovsen 56' | Report | Burger 13'; Feiersinger 85' |

Ullevaal Stadion, Oslo
Attendance: 3,564
Referee: Riem Hussein (Germany)

6 June 2016
19:00

| Austria | 4–0 | Israel |
|---|---|---|
| Burger 4', 19'; Barqui 41' (o.g.); Kirchberger 78' | Report |

Waldviertler Volksbank Arena, Horn
Attendance: 1,100
Referee: Sofia Karagiorgi (Cyprus)

7 June 2016
18:00

| Wales | 0–2 | Norway |
|---|---|---|
| | Report | Ad. Hegerberg 69', 81' |

Newport Stadium, Newport
Attendance: 703
Referee: Zuzana Kováčová (Slovakia)

15 September 2016
17:55

| Norway | 10–0 | Kazakhstan |
|---|---|---|
| Ad. Hegerberg 8'; Herlovsen 10', 12', 79'; Reinås 21'; Mjelde 23', 45+1'; Graham Hansen 29'; Isaksen 77'; An. Hegerberg 81' | Report |

Aker Stadion, Molde
Attendance: 2,315
Referee: Tess Olofsson (Sweden)
15 September 2016
20:05

| Wales | 3–0 | Israel |
|---|---|---|
| Ward 16', 32'; Estcourt 59' | Report |

Rodney Parade, Newport
Attendance: 683
Referee: Eszter Urban (Hungary)

19 September 2016
17:55

| Norway | 5–0 | Israel |
|---|---|---|
| Ad. Hegerberg 43', 48', 52'; Bøe Risa 71'; Herlovsen 80' | Report |

Høddvoll Stadion, Ulsteinvik
Attendance: 2,326
Referee: Paula Brady (Republic of Ireland)

20 September 2016
19:00

| Wales | 0–0 | Austria |
|---|---|---|
| | Report |

Rodney Parade, Newport
Attendance: 705
Referee: Eleni Lampadariou (Greece)

== Goalscorers ==
10 goals

- (Norway) Ada Hegerberg

7 goals

- (Norway) Isabell Herlovsen
- (Wales) Helen Ward

5 goals

- (Austria) Nina Burger

4 goals

- (Austria) Nicole Billa
- (Norway) Maren Mjelde

3 goals

- (Wales) Natasha Harding

2 goals

- (Austria) Katharina Schiechtl
- (Norway) Emilie Haavi
- (Wales) Kayleigh Green

1 goal

- (Austria) Verena Aschauer
- (Austria) Laura Feiersinger
- (Austria) Virginia Kirchberger
- (Austria) Nadine Prohaska
- (Austria) Sarah Puntigam
- (Austria) Sarah Zadrazil
- (Israel) Lee Falkon
- Rachel Shelina Israel
- (Kazakhstan) Begaim Kirgizbaeva
- (Kazakhstan) Mariya Yalova
- (Norway) Vilde Bøe Risa
- (Norway) Caroline Graham Hansen
- (Norway) Andrine Hegerberg
- (Norway) Ingvild Isaksen
- (Norway) Lene Mykjåland
- (Norway) Stine Reinås
- (Wales) Charlie Estcourt

1 own goal

- (Israel) Maya Barqui (playing against Austria)
