= Mara Bâtea =

Romanian footballer (born 1995)

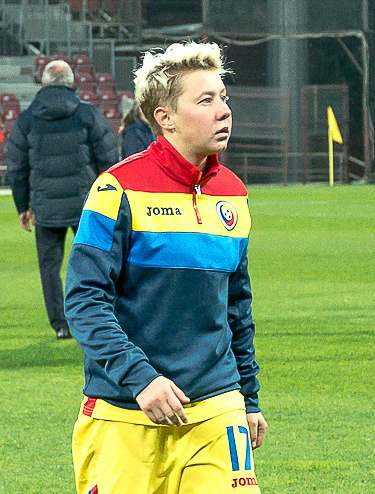

Personal information
- Full name: Mara Anca Bâtea
- Date of birth: 12 April 1995 (age 31)
- Place of birth: Cluj-Napoca, Romania
- Position: Midfielder

Team information
- Current team: Olimpia Cluj
- Number: 11

Senior career*
Years	Team	Apps	(Gls)
2011–	Olimpia Cluj		

International career^{‡}
2010–2011	Romania U17	6	(0)
2011–2014	Romania U19	15	(1)
2012–	Romania	31	(4)
- * Club domestic league appearances and goals as of 21:29, 31 March 2015 (UTC) ‡ National team caps and goals as of 01:10, 11 September 2022 (UTC)

Mara Bâtea (born 12 April 1995) is a Romanian women's football midfielder, currently playing for Olimpia Cluj. She has been a member of the Romanian national team since 2012.

Goals for the Romanian WNT in official competitions
Competition	Stage	Date	Location	Opponent	Goals	Result	Overall
2015 FIFA World Cup	Qualifiers	2014-08-21	Mogoșoaia	North Macedonia	1	6–1	1
2017 UEFA Euro	Qualifiers	2016-09-20	Cluj	Greece	1	4–0	1

== Honours ==
Olimpia Cluj Winner

- Romanian Superliga (3): 2011–12, 2012–13, 2013–14, 2014–15, 2015–16, 2016–17, 2017–18
- Romanian Women's Cup: 2013–14, 2014–15, 2016–17

== International goals ==
Scores and results list Romania's goal tally first.

No.	Date	Venue	Opponent	Score	Result	Competition
1.	21 August 2014	Stadionul Mogoşoaia, Mogoșoaia, Romania	North Macedonia	2–0	6–1	2015 FIFA Women's World Cup qualification
2.	20 September 2016	Stadionul Dr. Constantin Rădulescu, Cluj-Napoca, Romania	Greece	4–0	4–0	UEFA Women's Euro 2017 qualifying
3.	3 March 2018	Gold City, Alanya, Turkey	Kosovo	2–0	3–0	2018 Turkish Women's Cup
4.	3 March 2018	Gold City, Alanya, Turkey	Kosovo	3–0	3–0	2018 Turkish Women's Cup
5.	4 September 2018	Estádio Dr. Machado de Matos, Felgueiras, Portugal	Portugal	1–0	1–5	2019 FIFA Women's World Cup qualification
