= UEFA Women's Euro 2017 qualifying =

Tournament details
- Dates: 4 April 2015 – 25 October 2016
- Teams: 46 (from 1 confederation)

Tournament statistics
- Matches played: 174
- Goals scored: 672 (3.86 per match)
- Attendance: 363,160 (2,087 per match)
- Top scorer(s): (Iceland) Harpa Þorsteinsdóttir (Norway) Ada Hegerberg (Scotland) Jane Ross (10 goals each)

The UEFA Women's Euro 2017 qualifying competition was a women's football competition that determined the 15 teams joining the automatically qualified hosts Netherlands in the UEFA Women's Euro 2017 final tournament.

A total of 46 UEFA member national teams, with Andorra entering for the first time at senior women's level, entered the qualifying competition.

== Format ==
The qualifying competition consisted of three rounds:

- Preliminary round: The eight lowest-ranked teams were drawn into two groups of four teams. Each group was played in single round-robin format at one of the teams which were pre-selected as hosts. The two group winners advanced to the qualifying group stage.
- Qualifying group stage: The 40 teams (38 highest-ranked teams and two preliminary round qualifiers) are drawn into eight groups of five teams. Each group was played in home-and-away round-robin format. The eight group winners and the six best runners-up (not counting results against the fifth-placed team) qualified directly for the final tournament, while the two remaining runners-up advance to the play-offs.
- Play-offs: The two teams played home-and-away two-legged matches to determine the last qualified team.

=== Tiebreakers ===
In the preliminary round and qualifying group stage, the teams are ranked according to points (3 points for a win, 1 point for a draw, 0 points for a loss). If two or more teams are equal on points on completion of a group, the following tie-breaking criteria are applied, in the order given, to determine the rankings (Regulations Articles 13.01, 13.02 and 15.01):

1. Higher number of points obtained in the mini-tournament or group matches played among the teams in question;
2. Superior goal difference resulting from the mini-tournament or group matches played among the teams in question;
3. Higher number of goals scored in the mini-tournament or group matches played among the teams in question;
4. (Qualifying group stage only) Higher number of goals scored away from home in the group matches played among the teams in question;
5. If, after having applied criteria 1 to 4, teams still have an equal ranking, criteria 1 to 4 are reapplied exclusively to the mini-tournament or group matches between the teams in question to determine their final rankings. If this procedure does not lead to a decision, criteria 6 to 11 apply;
6. Superior goal difference in all mini-tournament or group matches;
7. Higher number of goals scored in all mini-tournament or group matches;
8. (Qualifying group stage only) Higher number of away goals scored in all group matches;
9. (Preliminary round only) If only two teams have the same number of points, and they are tied according to criteria 1 to 7 after having met in the last round of the mini-tournament, their rankings are determined by a penalty shoot-out (not used if more than two teams have the same number of points, or if their rankings are not relevant for qualification for the next stage).
10. Lower disciplinary points total based only on yellow and red cards received in the mini-tournament or group matches (red card = 3 points, yellow card = 1 point, expulsion for two yellow cards in one match = 3 points);
11. Position in the UEFA women's national team coefficient ranking for the preliminary round or qualifying group stage draw.

To determine the six best runners-up from the qualifying group stage, the results against the teams in fifth place are discarded. The following criteria are applied (Regulations Article 15.02):

1. Higher number of points;
2. Superior goal difference;
3. Higher number of goals scored;
4. Higher number of away goals scored;
5. Lower disciplinary points total based only on yellow and red cards received (red card = 3 points, yellow card = 1 point, expulsion for two yellow cards in one match = 3 points);
6. Position in the UEFA women's national team coefficient ranking for the qualifying group stage draw.

In the play-offs, the team that scores more goals on aggregate over the two legs qualifies for the final tournament. If the aggregate score is level, the away goals rule is applied, i.e., the team that scores more goals away from home over the two legs advances. If away goals are also equal, extra time is played. The away goals rule is again applied after extra time, i.e., if there are goals scored during extra time and the aggregate score is still level, the visiting team advances by virtue of more away goals scored. If no goals are scored during extra time, the tie is decided by penalty shoot-out (Regulations Articles 16.01 and 16.02).

== Schedule ==
The qualifying matches are played on dates that fall within the FIFA Women's International Match Calendar.

Stage	FIFA International Dates
Preliminary round	4–9 April 2015
Qualifying group stage	14–22 September 2015
Qualifying group stage	19–27 October 2015
Qualifying group stage	23 November – 1 December 2015
Qualifying group stage	18–26 January 2016
Qualifying group stage	29 February – 9 March 2016
Qualifying group stage	4–12 April 2016
Qualifying group stage	30 May – 7 June 2016
Qualifying group stage	12–20 September 2016
Play-offs	17–25 October 2016

== Entrants ==
The teams were ranked according to their coefficient ranking, calculated based on the following:

- 2011 FIFA Women's World Cup final tournament and qualifying competition (20%)
- UEFA Women's Euro 2013 final tournament and qualifying competition (40%)
- 2015 FIFA Women's World Cup qualifying competition (40%)

The 38 highest-ranked teams entered the qualifying group stage, while the eight lowest-ranked teams entered the preliminary round. The coefficient ranking was also used for seeding in the qualifying group stage draw.

Final tournament hosts
Team	Coeff	Rank
**Netherlands**	34,486	8

Teams entering qualifying group stage

Pot A
Team	Coeff	Rank
Germany	43,665	1
France	42,552	2
Sweden	42,433	3
Norway	39,315	4
England	38,133	5
Italy	36,666	6
Spain	35,941	7
Iceland	32,778	9

Pot B
Team	Coeff	Rank
**Russia**	32,712	10
**Denmark**	32,615	11
Finland	32,605	12
**Switzerland**	32,558	13
**Scotland**	31,264	14
**Austria**	29,847	15
Ukraine	29,064	16
**Belgium**	28,825	17

Pot C
Team	Coeff	Rank
Poland	27,555	18
Czech Republic	25,750	19
Wales	25,070	20
Republic of Ireland	24,581	21
Romania	22,954	22
Hungary	22,434	23
Serbia	21,747	24
Belarus	21,634	25

Pot D
Team	Coeff	Rank
**Portugal**	20,925	26
Northern Ireland	18,141	27
Slovakia	17,691	28
Bosnia and Herzegovina	16,806	29
Turkey	15,528	30
Israel	14,841	31
Slovenia	14,736	32
Greece	14,219	33

Pot E
Team	Coeff	Rank
Estonia	13,281	34
Croatia	13,111	35
Kazakhstan	12,591	36
Albania	9,991	38
Macedonia	8,032	40
Montenegro	7,443	41

Teams entering preliminary round

Team	Coeff	Rank
Faroe Islands	7,357	42
Malta **(H)**	6,723	44
Georgia	6,063	45
Lithuania	4,585	46
Latvia	4,042	47
Luxembourg	3,918	48
Andorra	—	—
Moldova **(H)**	—	—

Notes

- Teams which were pre-selected as preliminary round hosts were denoted by **(H)**.
- Teams marked in **bold** have qualified for the final tournament.

Did not enter
Team	Coeff	Rank
Azerbaijan	11,375	37
Bulgaria	9,960	39
Armenia	7,275	43
Cyprus	—	—
Gibraltar	—	—
Liechtenstein	—	—
San Marino	—	—

== Preliminary round ==
=== Draw ===
The draw for the preliminary round was held on 19 January 2015, 13:45 CET (UTC+1), at the UEFA headquarters in Nyon, Switzerland.

The teams were divided into two pots: Pot 1 contained the two teams which were pre-selected as hosts (Malta and Moldova), while Pot 2 contained the six remaining teams (Andorra, Faroe Islands, Georgia, Latvia, Lithuania, and Luxembourg). Each group contained one team from Pot 1 and three teams from Pot 2.

=== Groups ===
The two group winners advanced to the qualifying group stage.

==== Group 1 ====
Pos	Team	Pld	W	D	L	GF	GA	GD	Pts	Qualification	Moldova	Latvia	Lithuania	Luxembourg
1	Moldova (H)	3	2	0	1	5	1	+4	6	Qualifying group stage	—	0–1	2–0	—
2	Latvia	3	1	1	1	5	5	0	4		—	—	1–1	—
3	Lithuania	3	1	1	1	3	3	0	4		—	—	—	2–0
4	Luxembourg	3	1	0	2	4	8	−4	3		0–3	4–3	—	—

Source: UEFA
(H) Hosts

==== Group 2 ====
Pos	Team	Pld	W	D	L	GF	GA	GD	Pts	Qualification	Georgia	Faroe Islands	Malta	Andorra
1	Georgia	3	2	0	1	10	2	+8	6 (Note: Ranked by head-to-head record (Georgia: 3 pts, +1 GD; Faroe Islands: 3 pts, 0 GD; Malta: 3 pts, −1 GD).)	Qualifying group stage	—	2–0	1–2	—
2	Faroe Islands	3	2	0	1	12	4	+8	6		—	—	—	8–0
3	Malta (H)	3	2	0	1	9	8	+1	6		—	2–4	—	—
4	Andorra	3	0	0	3	3	20	−17	0		0–7	—	3–5	—

Source: UEFA
(H) Hosts

== Qualifying group stage ==
=== Draw ===
The draw for the qualifying group stage was held on 20 April 2015, 14:00 CEST (UTC+2), at the UEFA headquarters in Nyon, Switzerland.

The teams were seeded according to their coefficient ranking (see section Entrants). Each group contained one team from each of the five seeding pots. The two teams which qualified from the preliminary round, Moldova and Georgia, were placed in Pot E for the group stage draw.

=== Groups ===
The eight group winners and the six best group runners-up (not counting results against fifth-placed team) qualified directly for the final tournament.
The remaining two runners-up advanced to the play-offs.

==== Group 1 ====
Pos	Team	Pld	W	D	L	GF	GA	GD	Pts	Qualification	Iceland	Scotland	Slovenia	Belarus	North Macedonia
1	Iceland	8	7	0	1	34	2	+32	21 (Note: Head-to-head results: Scotland 0–4 Iceland, Iceland 1–2 Scotland.)	Final tournament	—	1–2	4–0	2–0	8–0
2	Scotland	8	7	0	1	30	7	+23	21	Final tournament	0–4	—	3–1	7–0	10–0
3	Slovenia	8	3	0	5	21	19	+2	9 (Note: Head-to-head results: Slovenia 3–0 Belarus, Belarus 2–0 Slovenia.)		0–6	0–3	—	3–0	8–1
4	Belarus	8	3	0	5	10	20	−10	9		0–5	0–1	2–0	—	6–2
5	Macedonia	8	0	0	8	4	51	−47	0		0–4	1–4	0–9	0–2	—

Source: UEFA

==== Group 2 ====
Pos	Team	Pld	W	D	L	GF	GA	GD	Pts	Qualification	Spain	Portugal	Finland	Ireland	Montenegro
1	Spain	8	8	0	0	39	2	+37	24	Final tournament	—	2–0	5–0	3–0	13–0
2	Portugal	8	4	1	3	15	11	+4	13 (Note: Head-to-head results: Finland 0–0 Portugal, Portugal 3–2 Finland.)	Play-offs	1–4	—	3–2	1–2	6–1
3	Finland	8	4	1	3	17	12	+5	13		1–2	0–0	—	4–1	1–0
4	Republic of Ireland	8	3	0	5	17	14	+3	9		0–3	0–1	0–2	—	9–0
5	Montenegro	8	0	0	8	2	51	−49	0		0–7	0–3	1–7	0–5	—

Source: UEFA

==== Group 3 ====
Pos	Team	Pld	W	D	L	GF	GA	GD	Pts	Qualification	France	Romania	Ukraine	Greece	Albania
1	France	8	8	0	0	27	0	+27	24	Final tournament	—	3–0	4–0	1–0	6–0
2	Romania	8	5	1	2	17	8	+9	16	Play-offs	0–1	—	2–1	4–0	3–0
3	Ukraine	8	4	1	3	14	12	+2	13		0–3	2–2	—	2–0	2–0
4	Greece	8	2	0	6	9	19	−10	6		0–3	1–3	1–3	—	3–2
5	Albania	8	0	0	8	3	31	−28	0		0–6	0–3	0–4	1–4	—

Source: UEFA

==== Group 4 ====
Pos	Team	Pld	W	D	L	GF	GA	GD	Pts	Qualification	Sweden	Denmark	Poland	Slovakia	Moldova
1	Sweden	8	7	0	1	22	3	+19	21	Final tournament	—	1–0	3–0	2–1	6–0
2	Denmark	8	6	1	1	22	1	+21	19	Final tournament	2–0	—	6–0	4–0	4–0
3	Poland	8	3	1	4	10	16	−6	10		0–4	0–0	—	2–0	4–0
4	Slovakia	8	3	0	5	11	13	−2	9		0–3	0–1	2–1	—	4–0
5	Moldova	8	0	0	8	1	33	−32	0		0–3	0–5	1–3	0–4	—

Source: UEFA

==== Group 5 ====
Pos	Team	Pld	W	D	L	GF	GA	GD	Pts	Qualification	Germany	Russia	Hungary	Croatia	Turkey
1	Germany	8	8	0	0	35	0	+35	24	Final tournament	—	2–0	12–0	2–0	7–0
2	Russia	8	4	2	2	14	9	+5	14	Final tournament	0–4	—	3–3	5–0	2–0
3	Hungary	8	2	2	4	8	20	−12	8		0–1	0–1	—	2–0	1–0
4	Croatia	8	2	1	5	8	15	−7	7		0–1	0–3	1–1	—	3–0
5	Turkey	8	1	1	6	3	24	−21	4		0–6	0–0	2–1	1–4	—

Source: UEFA

==== Group 6 ====
Pos	Team	Pld	W	D	L	GF	GA	GD	Pts	Qualification	Switzerland	Italy	Czech Republic		Georgia
1	Switzerland	8	8	0	0	34	3	+31	24	Final tournament	—	2–1	5–1	4–0	4–0
2	Italy	8	6	0	2	26	8	+18	18	Final tournament	0–3	—	3–1	3–1	6–1
3	Czech Republic	8	3	1	4	13	18	−5	10		0–5	0–3	—	3–0	4–1
4	Northern Ireland	8	2	1	5	10	22	−12	7		1–8	0–3	1–1	—	4–0
5	Georgia	8	0	0	8	2	34	−32	0		0–3	0–7	0–3	0–3	—

Source: UEFA

==== Group 7 ====
Pos	Team	Pld	W	D	L	GF	GA	GD	Pts	Qualification	England	Belgium	Serbia	Bosnia and Herzegovina	Estonia
1	England	8	7	1	0	32	1	+31	22	Final tournament	—	1–1	7–0	1–0	5–0
2	Belgium	8	5	2	1	27	5	+22	17	Final tournament	0–2	—	1–1	6–0	6–0
3	Serbia	8	3	1	4	10	21	−11	10		0–7	1–3	—	0–1	3–0
4	Bosnia and Herzegovina	8	3	0	5	8	17	−9	9		0–1	0–5	2–4	—	4–0
5	Estonia	8	0	0	8	0	33	−33	0		0–8	0–5	0–1	0–1	—

Source: UEFA

==== Group 8 ====
Pos	Team	Pld	W	D	L	GF	GA	GD	Pts	Qualification	Norway	Austria	Wales	Kazakhstan	Israel
1	Norway	8	7	1	0	29	2	+27	22	Final tournament	—	2–2	4–0	10–0	5–0
2	Austria	8	5	2	1	18	4	+14	17	Final tournament	0–1	—	3–0	6–1	4–0
3	Wales	8	3	2	3	13	11	+2	11		0–2	0–0	—	4–0	3–0
4	Kazakhstan	8	1	1	6	2	30	−28	4		0–4	0–2	0–4	—	1–0
5	Israel	8	0	2	6	2	17	−15	2		0–1	0–1	2–2	0–0	—

Source: UEFA

=== Ranking of second-placed teams ===
Despite the fact that every groups had 5 teams, in order to determine the six best second-placed teams from the qualifying group stage which qualified directly for the final tournament and the two remaining second-placed teams which advanced to the play-offs, the results against the fifth-placed team were not included. As a result, six matches played by each second-placed team were counted for the purposes of determining the ranking.

Pos	Grp	Team	Pld	W	D	L	GF	GA	GD	Pts	Qualification
1	1	Scotland	6	5	0	1	16	6	+10	15	Final tournament
2	4	Denmark	6	4	1	1	13	1	+12	13	Final tournament
3	6	Italy	6	4	0	2	13	7	+6	12	Final tournament
4	7	Belgium	6	3	2	1	16	5	+11	11	Final tournament
5	8	Austria	6	3	2	1	13	4	+9	11	Final tournament
6	5	Russia	6	3	1	2	12	9	+3	10	Final tournament
7	3	Romania	6	3	1	2	11	8	+3	10	Play-offs
8	2	Portugal	6	2	1	3	6	10	−4	7	Play-offs

Source: UEFA
Rules for classification: 1) points; 2) goal difference; 3) goals scored; 4) away goals scored; 5) disciplinary points; 6) coefficient.

== Play-offs ==
=== Draw ===
The draw for the play-offs (to decide the order of legs) was held on 23 September 2016, 14:00 CEST (UTC+2), at the UEFA headquarters in Nyon, Switzerland.

=== Matches ===
The play-off winner qualifies for the final tournament.

Team 1	Agg.	Team 2	1st leg	2nd leg
Portugal	(a) 1–1	Romania	0–0	1–1 (a.e.t.)

== Qualified teams ==
The following 16 teams qualify for the final tournament.

Team	Qualified as	Qualified on	Previous appearances in tournament^{1}
Netherlands	Hosts	4 December 2014	2 (2009, 2013)
Iceland	Group 1 winners	16 September 2016	2 (2009, 2013)
Spain	Group 2 winners	7 June 2016	2 (1997, 2013)
France	Group 3 winners	11 April 2016	5 (1997, 2001, 2005, 2009, 2013)
Sweden	Group 4 winners	15 September 2016	9 (**1984**, 1987, 1989, 1995, 1997, 2001, 2005, 2009, 2013)
Germany	Group 5 winners	12 April 2016	9 (**1989**^{2}, **1991**, 1993, **1995**, **1997**, **2001**, **2005**, **2009**, **2013**)
Switzerland	Group 6 winners	4 June 2016	0 (debut)
England	Group 7 winners	7 June 2016	7 (1984, 1987, 1995, 2001, 2005, 2009, 2013)
Norway	Group 8 winners	7 June 2016	10 (**1987**, 1989, 1991, **1993**, 1995, 1997, 2001, 2005, 2009, 2013)
Scotland	Best six runners-up	16 September 2016	0 (debut)
Denmark	Best six runners-up	20 September 2016	8 (1984, 1991, 1993, 1997, 2001, 2005, 2009, 2013)
Italy	Best six runners-up	20 September 2016	10 (1984, 1987, 1989, 1991, 1993, 1997, 2001, 2005, 2009, 2013)
Belgium	Best six runners-up	16 September 2016	0 (debut)
Austria	Best six runners-up	20 September 2016	0 (debut)
Russia	Best six runners-up	20 September 2016	4 (1997, 2001, 2009, 2013)
Portugal	Play-off winners	25 October 2016	0 (debut)

^{1} Bold indicates champion for that year. Italic indicates host for that year.
^{2} As West Germany

== Top goalscorers ==
Players with six goals or more.

10 goals

- (Iceland) Harpa Þorsteinsdóttir
- (Norway) Ada Hegerberg
- (Scotland) Jane Ross

8 goals

- (France) Eugénie Le Sommer
- (Spain) Verónica Boquete

7 goals

- (Denmark) Pernille Harder
- (Denmark) Nadia Nadim
- (Iceland) Dagný Brynjarsdóttir
- (Norway) Isabell Herlovsen
- (Switzerland) Ana-Maria Crnogorčević
- (Wales) Helen Ward

6 goals

- (Bosnia and Herzegovina) Milena Nikolić
- (Denmark) Sanne Troelsgaard Nielsen
- (England) Karen Carney
- (England) Danielle Carter
- (Italy) Cristiana Girelli
- (Portugal) Cláudia Neto
- (Scotland) Joanne Love
- (Spain) Sonia Bermúdez
- (Switzerland) Fabienne Humm
