= Claudia Bistrian =

Romanian footballer (born 1996)

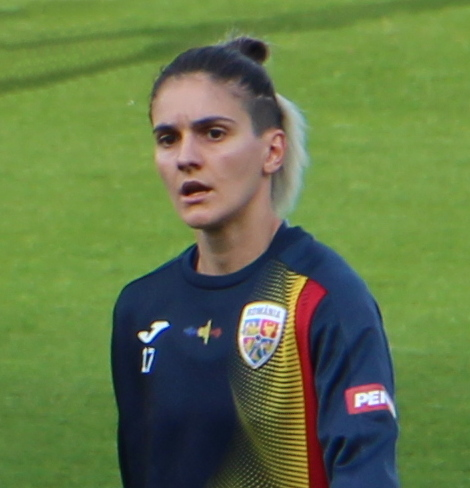

Personal information
- Date of birth: 31 August 1996 (age 30)
- Position: Midfielder

International career^{‡}
Years	Team	Apps	(Gls)
- Romania
- ‡ National team caps and goals as of 19:47, 30 August 2019 (UTC)

Claudia Bistrian (born 31 August 1996) is a Romanian footballer who plays as a midfielder and has appeared for the Romania women's national team.

== Career ==
Bistrian has been capped for the Romania national team, appearing during the 2019 FIFA Women's World Cup qualifying cycle.
