= Daniela Gurz =

Romanian footballer (born 1991)

Personal information
- Full name: Daniela Gurz
- Date of birth: 21 April 1991 (age 35)
- Place of birth: Mintiu Gherlii, Romania
- Position: Defender

Team information
- Current team: Olimpia Cluj
- Number: 17

Senior career*
Years	Team	Apps	(Gls)
2005–2010	Clujana		
- Târgu Mureş
2010–2013	Olimpia Cluj		
2014–2016	FC Metz		
2016–2017	FC Rouen		
2017–2018	FC Aire-Le-Lignon		
2018–	ENP Famagusta FC		

International career
2011–	Romania		
- * Club domestic league appearances and goals

Daniela Gurz is a Romanian football defender currently playing for ENP Famagusta FC. She has played the Champions League with CFF Clujana, FCM Târgu Mureş and Olimpia Cluj, and she made her debut for the Romanian national team in the 2013 European Championship qualifying against Kazakhstan.
