= Corina Olar =

Romanian footballer (born 1984)

Personal information
- Date of birth: 27 August 1984 (age 42)
- Place of birth: Hunedoara, Romania
- Height: 1.73 m (5 ft 8 in)
- Position: Defender

Team information
- Current team: Olimpia Cluj
- Number: 22

Senior career*
Years	Team	Apps	(Gls)
2003–2008	Olimpia Cluj		
2008–2011	Apollon Limassol		
2012–	Olimpia Cluj		

International career
2005–	Romania		
- * Club domestic league appearances and goals

Corina-Simona Olar-Corniciuc (born 27 August 1984) is a Romanian footballer. She currently plays for Olimpia Cluj and the Romanian national team as a defender.
