= Andreea Voicu =

Romanian footballer

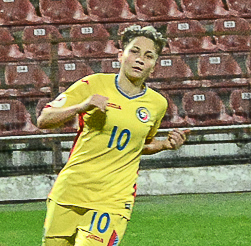

Personal information
- Full name: Andreea Voicu
- Date of birth: 16 January 1996 (age 30)
- Place of birth: Romania
- Position: Midfielder

Team information
- Current team: FCU Olimpia Cluj
- Number: 8

Senior career*
Years	Team	Apps	(Gls)
–2018	FCU Olimpia Cluj		
2018–2019	Apollon Ladies	18	(9)
2019–	FCU Olimpia Cluj		

International career
2012–	Romania		
- * Club domestic league appearances and goals

Andreea Voicu (born 16 January 1996) is a Romanian football defender currently playing for FCU Olimpia Cluj. She played most of her career in the First League for Olimpia Cluj, with which she has also played the Champions League. She made her debut for the Romanian national team at 16 in the 2013 European Championship qualifying against Switzerland.

Andrea was declared the best woman footballer playing in Romania in 2017 at the Association of Amateur and Non-amateur Footballers of Romania (AFAN) gala.

Goals scored for the Romanian WNT in official competitions
Competition	Stage	Date	Location	Opponent	Goals	Result	Overall
2015 FIFA World Cup	Qualifiers	2014–08–21	Mogoșoaia	North Macedonia	1	6–1	1
2017 UEFA Euro	Qualifiers	2015–10–22	Lviv	Ukraine	1	2–2	2
2017 UEFA Euro	Qualifiers	2015–11–27	Katerini	Greece	1	3–1	2
2019 FIFA World Cup	Qualifiers	2017–11–28	Mogoșoaia	Moldova	2	3–1	2
