= Alexandra Lunca =

Romanian footballer (born 1995)

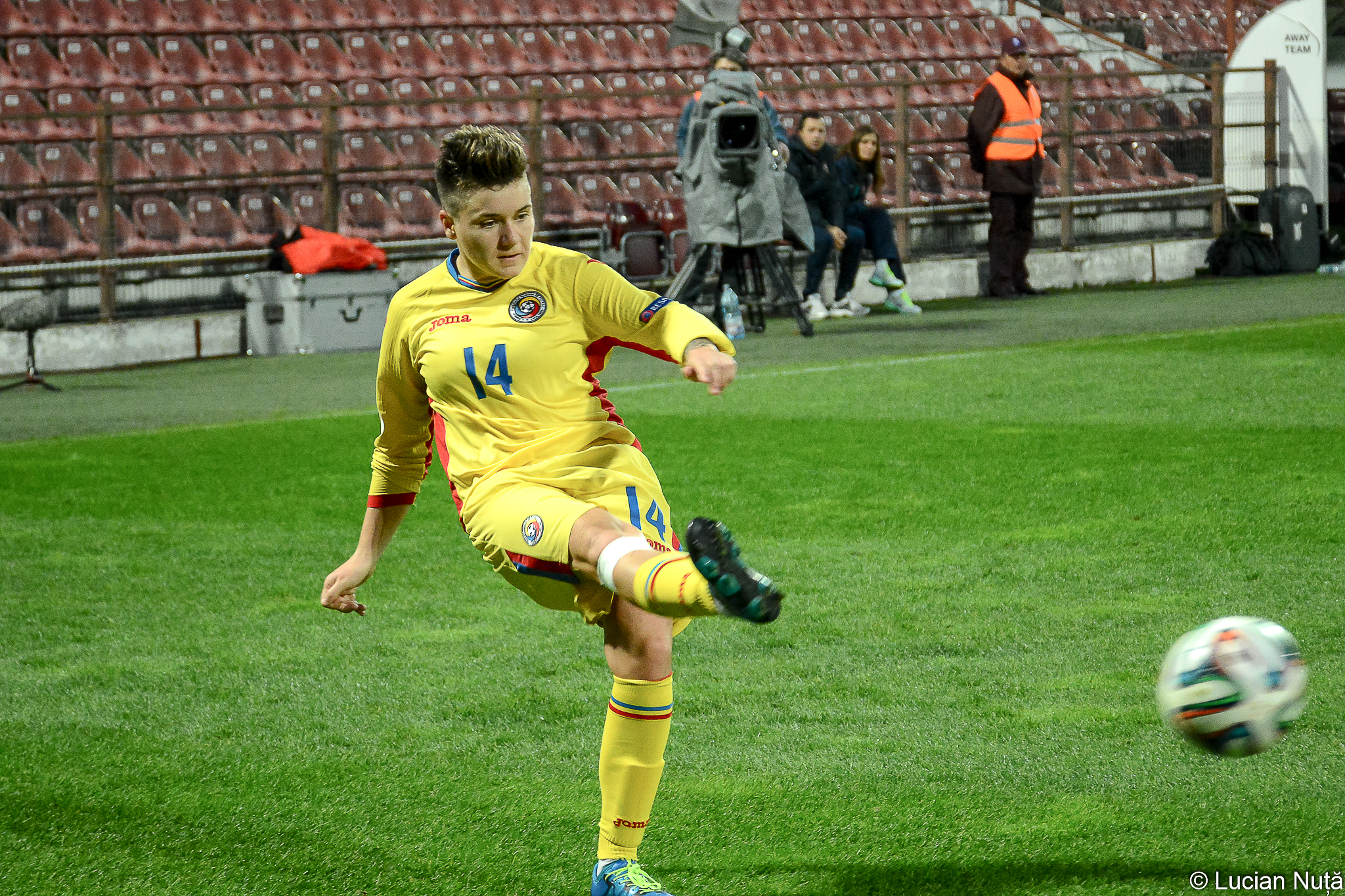
- Alexandra Lunca in 2016

Personal information
- Full name: Alexandra Lunca
- Date of birth: 22 August 1995 (age 31)
- Place of birth: Romania
- Position: Striker

Team information
- Current team: Fortuna Becicherecu Mic

Senior career*
Years	Team	Apps	(Gls)
2011–2017	Olimpia Cluj		
2018–	Fortuna Becicherecu Mic		

International career
2010–2011	Romania U17	6	(6)
2011–2014	Romania U19	15	(14)
2011–	Romania	12	(2)
- * Club domestic league appearances and goals

Alexandra Lunca (born 22 August 1995) is a Romanian football striker currently playing in the Romanian First League for Fortuna Becicherecu Mic, with which she has also played the Champions League. She is a member of the Romanian national team having made her official debut in November 2011 against Spain at 16, and as a junior international she subsequently played the 2012 U-19 European Championship.

== Notable goals ==
Data	Team	Opponent	Result	Status	Goal
16.08.2011	(Romania) Olimpia Cluj	(Turkey) Ataşehir Belediyesi	4–1	2011–12 UEFA Women's Champions League	64', 77'
17.09.2011	Romania U-19	Lithuania U-19	7–0	2012 UEFA Women's U-19 Championship	5', 46', 50', 54', 60', 65'
19.09.2011	Romania U-19	Northern Ireland U-19	3–0	2012 UEFA Women's U-19 Championship	15', 62', 84'
10.10.2011	Romania U-17	Republic of Ireland U-17	2–3	2012 UEFA Women's U-17 Championship	57'
12.10.2011	Romania U-17	Italy U-17	3–2	2012 UEFA Women's U-17 Championship	30'
15.10.2011	Romania U-17	North Macedonia U-17	6–1	2012 UEFA Women's U-17 Championship	4', 14', 20', 71'
05.04.2012	Romania U-19	Netherlands U-19	1–1	2012 UEFA Women's U-19 Championship	44'
11.08.2012	(Romania) Olimpia Cluj	(Malta) Birkirkara	8–0	2012–13 UEFA Women's Champions League	20'
13.08.2012	(Romania) Olimpia Cluj	(Northern Ireland) Glentoran Belfast United	4–2	2012–13 UEFA Women's Champions League	84'
16.08.2012	(Romania) Olimpia Cluj	(Portugal) 1° Dezembro	4–1	2012–13 UEFA Women's Champions League	59'
03.10.2012	(Romania) Olimpia Cluj	(Austria) Neulengbach	2–2	2012–13 UEFA Women's Champions League	81', 101'
08.08.2013	(Romania) Olimpia Cluj	(Lithuania) Gintra Universitetas	3–0	2013–14 UEFA Women's Champions League	26', 36'
10.08.2013	(Romania) Olimpia Cluj	(Latvia) Liepājas Metalurgs	7–0	2013–14 UEFA Women's Champions League	53', 89'
13.08.2013	(Romania) Olimpia Cluj	(Serbia) Spartak Subotica	3–8	2013–14 UEFA Women's Champions League	59', 81'
21.08.2014	Romania	North Macedonia	6–1	2015 FIFA Women's World Cup	55', 63'
11.08.2015	(Romania) Olimpia Cluj	(Estonia) Pärnu JK	4–0	2015–16 UEFA Women's Champions League	11', 63'
13.08.2015	(Romania) Olimpia Cluj	(Montenegro) ŽFK Ekonomist	6–1	2015–16 UEFA Women's Champions League	73', 81'
27.10.2015	Romania	Albania	3–0	2017 UEFA Women's Championship	9'
23.08.2016	(Romania) Olimpia Cluj	(Estonia) Pärnu JK	7–1	2016–17 UEFA Women's Champions League	50', 60'
25.08.2016	(Romania) Olimpia Cluj	(Montenegro) ŽFK Breznica	10–0	2016–17 UEFA Women's Champions League	21', 26', 28', 41'
28.08.2016	(Romania) Olimpia Cluj	(Poland) Medyk Konin	1–3	2016–17 UEFA Women's Champions League	90'

== Titles ==
In its five years, five national doubles were won.

- 6 Romanian championships: 2011, 2012, 2013, 2014, 2015, 2016
- 5 Romanian Women's Cup: 2011, 2012, 2013, 2014, 2015
