= Maria Ficzay =

Romanian footballer (born 1991)

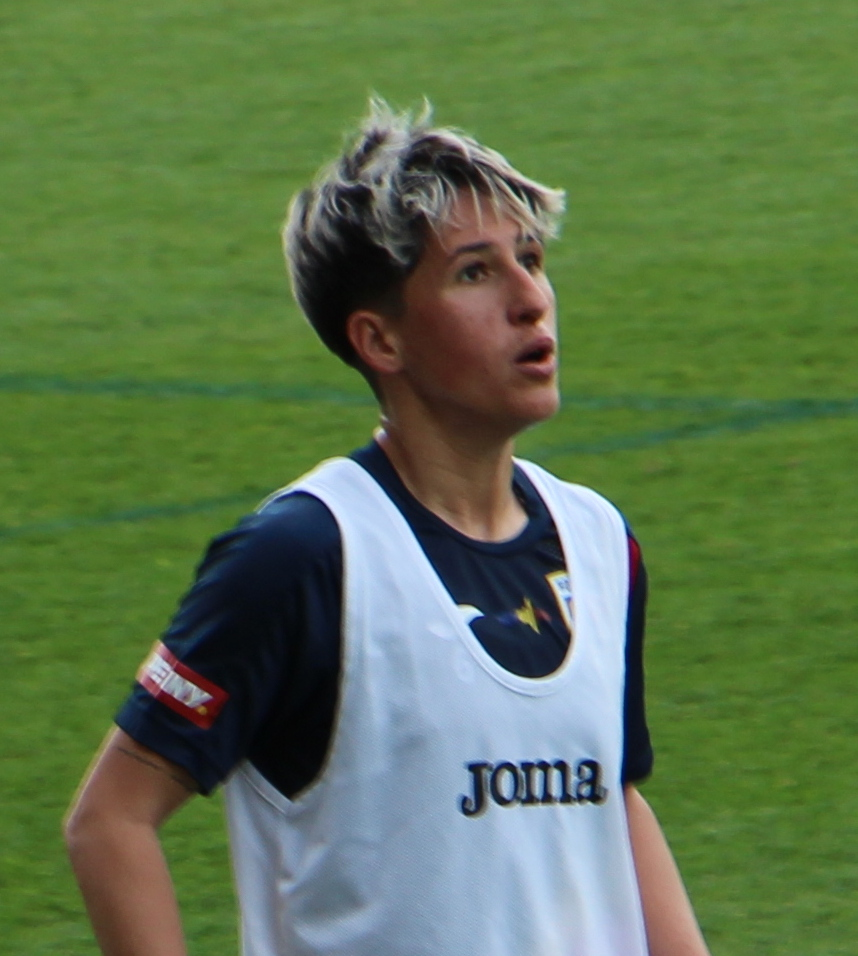

Personal information
- Full name: Maria Mihaela Ficzay
- Date of birth: 8 November 1991 (age 34)
- Place of birth: Ocna Șugatag, Romania
- Position: Defender

Team information
- Current team: Apollon Ladies F.C.
- Number: 33

Senior career*
| Years | Team | Apps | (Gls) |
- Clujana
| 2010–2015 | Olimpia Cluj | | |
| 2015–2019 | Medyk Konin | | |
| 2019–2021 | Olimpia Cluj | | |
| 2021–2025 | Fortuna Hjørring | 39 | (2) |
| 2025– | Apollon Ladies F.C. | | |

International career
| 2010– | Romania | 123 | (2) |
- * Club domestic league appearances and goals as of 26 November 2024

Maria Ficzay (born 8 November 1991) is a Romanian women's football defender, currently playing for Apollon Ladies F.C..

She is also a member of the Romanian national team.

== Personal life ==
Ficzay was born in Ocna Șugatag on 8 November 1991 and has graduated in physical education.

== Club career ==
She started playing against local boys in her hometown of Ocna Șugatag when at the age of 15 her uncle, who was a football coach, recommended her to Clujana of the Romanian Championship. She then progressed to Olimpia Cluj, with which she has also played the UEFA Champions League and served as the team's captain.

She joined Medyk Konin during the second half of the 2014–15 season.

== Honours ==
Medyk Konin

- Ekstraliga: 2014–15, 2015–16, 2016–17
- Polish Cup: 2014–15, 2015–16, 2016–17

== International goals ==
| No. | Date | Venue | Opponent | Score | Result | Competition |
|---|---|---|---|---|---|---|
| 1. | 23 November 2012 | Buca Arena, İzmir, Turkey | Turkey | 2–0 | 2–1 | UEFA Women's Euro 2013 qualifying |
| 2. | 20 September 2016 | Stadionul Dr. Constantin Rădulescu, Cluj-Napoca, Romania | Greece | 4–0 | 4–0 | UEFA Women's Euro 2017 qualifying |
| 3. | 8 April 2022 | Stadionul Arcul de Triumf, Bucharest, Romania | Switzerland | 1–0 | 1–1 | 2023 FIFA Women's World Cup qualification |
| 4. | 3 September 2022 | LFF Stadium, Vilnius, Lithuania | Lithuania | 6–0 | 7–1 | 2023 FIFA Women's World Cup qualification |
