= Andreea Corduneanu =

Romanian women's football defender (born 1995)

Personal information
- Full name: Andreea Corduneanu
- Date of birth: 26 June 1995 (age 31)
- Place of birth: Botoșani, Romania
- Position: Defender

Team information
- Current team: Olimpia Cluj
- Number: 20

Senior career*
Years	Team	Apps	(Gls)
2011–2016	Olimpia Cluj		
2017	Aïre-le-Lignon		
2017	Diósgyőr		
2018	Heniu Prundu Bârgăului		
2018–	Olimpia Cluj		

International career^{‡}
2010–2011	Romania U17	6	(0)
2011–2014	Romania U19	15	(0)
2012–	Romania	9	(1)
- * Club domestic league appearances and goals as of 18:14, 18 January 2019 (UTC) ‡ National team caps and goals as of 21:26, 31 March 2015 (UTC)

Andreea Corduneanu (born 26 June 1995) is a Romanian women's football defender, currently playing for Olimpia Cluj. She has been a member of the Romanian national team since 2012. In her career Corduneanu also played for Swiss club Aïre-le-Lignon, Hungarian club Diósgyőri VTK and Heniu Prundu Bârgăului.

Goals for the Romanian WNT in official competitions
Competition	Stage	Date	Location	Opponent	Goals	Result	Overall
2015 FIFA World Cup	Qualifiers	2014-08-21	Mogoșoaia	Macedonia	1	6–1	1
2017 UEFA Euro	Qualifiers	2015-10-27	Mogoșoaia	Albania	1	3–0	1

== Honours ==
Olimpia Cluj Winner

- Romanian Superliga (7): 2011–12, 2012–13, 2013–14, 2014–14, 2015–16, 2016–17, 2017–18
- Romanian Women's Cup (5): 2011–12, 2012–13, 2013–14, 2014–15, 2016–17
