= Adina Giurgiu =

Romanian footballer (born 1994)

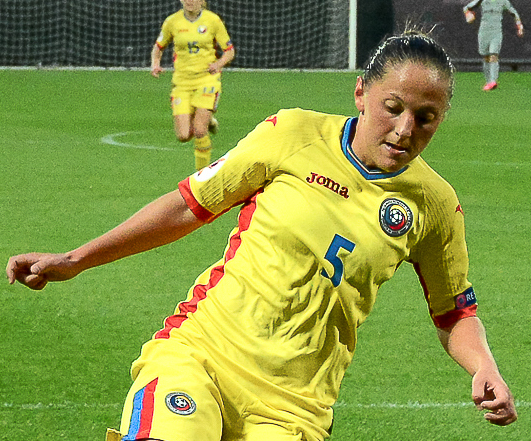
- Giurgiu in 2016

Personal information
- Full name: Adina Sabina Giurgiu
- Date of birth: 17 August 1994 (age 32)
- Place of birth: Arad, Romania
- Height: 1.60 m (5 ft 3 in)
- Position: Defender

Team information
- Current team: Sassuolo
- Number: 24

Senior career*
Years	Team	Apps	(Gls)
2011–2017	Olimpia Cluj		
2017–	Sassuolo	24	(3)
2021–2022	Nordsjælland		

International career^{‡}
2010	Romania U17	3	(0)
2010–2012	Romania U19	15	(0)
2013–	Romania	6	(1)
- * Club domestic league appearances and goals as of 00:37, 17 November 2018 (UTC) ‡ National team caps and goals as of 12:27, 24 October 2015 (UTC)

Adina Sabina Giurgiu (born 17 August 1994) is a Romanian footballer who plays as a defender. Giurgiu has played for Romanian Superliga club Olimpia Cluj, Italian Serie A club Sassuolo and Danish A-Liga club Nordsjælland.

== Honours ==
Olimpia Cluj Winner

- Romanian Superliga (4): 2011–12, 2012–13, 2013–14, 2014–15
- Romanian Women's Cup (2): 2013–14, 2014–15
