= Lidia Havriștiuc =

Romanian footballer (born 1991)

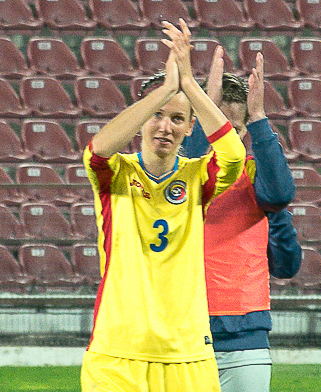

Personal information
- Date of birth: 27 March 1991 (age 35)
- Place of birth: Suceava, Romania
- Height: 1.72 m (5 ft 8 in)
- Position: Defender

Team information
- Current team: Olimpia Cluj
- Number: 24

Senior career*
Years	Team	Apps	(Gls)
–2015	CS Navobi Iași		
2015–2017	Olimpia Cluj		
2018–	FC Augsburg		

International career
- Romania
- * Club domestic league appearances and goals

Lidia Havriștiuc (born 27 March 1991) is a Romanian footballer who currently plays for FC Augsburg. She left Olimpia Cluj after a row with the club's chairman Alin Cioban, who was accused of holding back her contract extension and registering it with the football federation only when she decided to leave the club, in order to force the new club to pay a transfer fee. She has also played for the Romanian national team as a defender.

== Honours ==
=== Club ===
Olimpia Cluj

- Romanian Superliga (1): 2015–16
