= Mogoșoaia =

- Commune
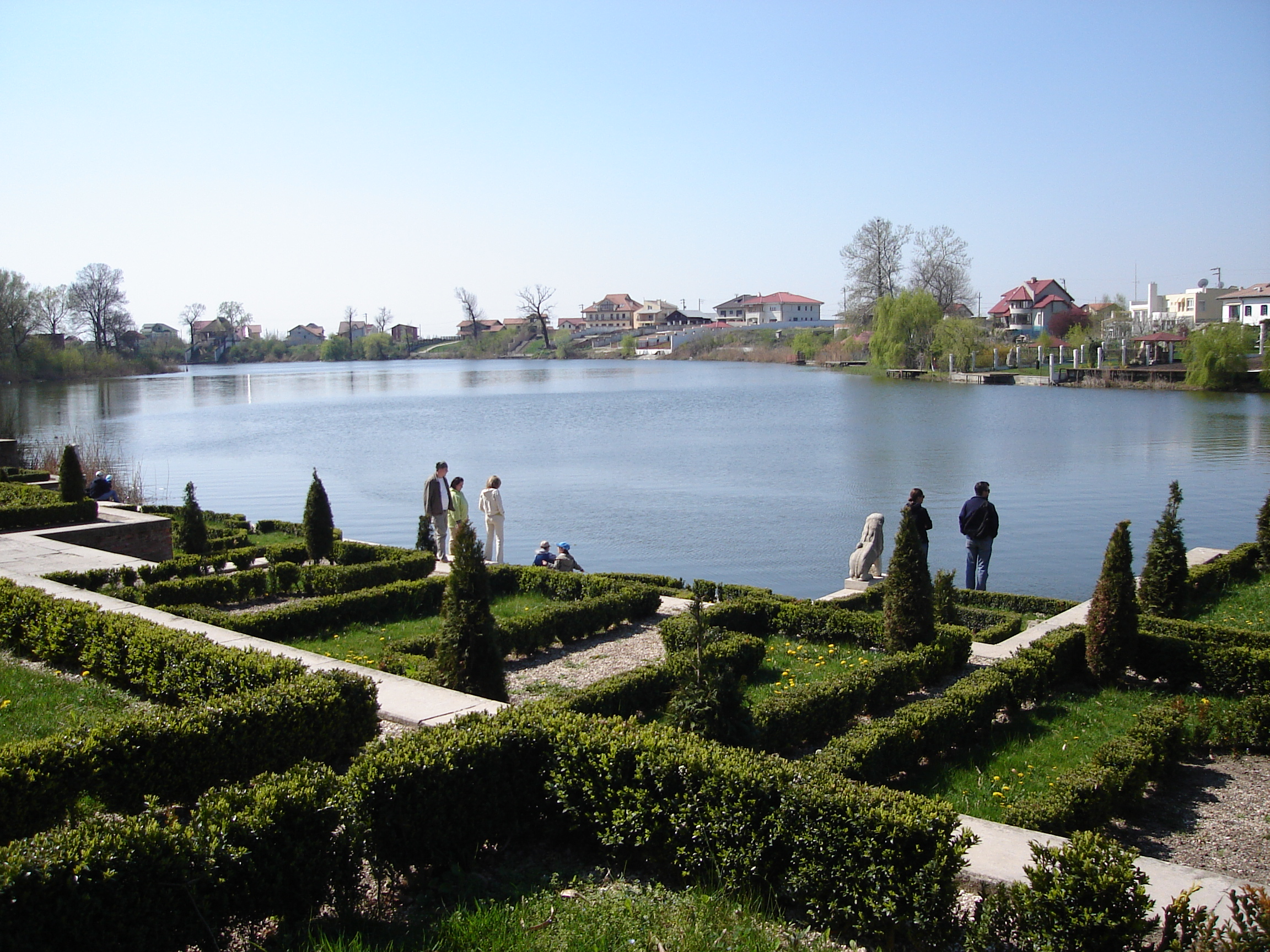
- Mogoșoaia Lake, view from Mogoșoaia Park

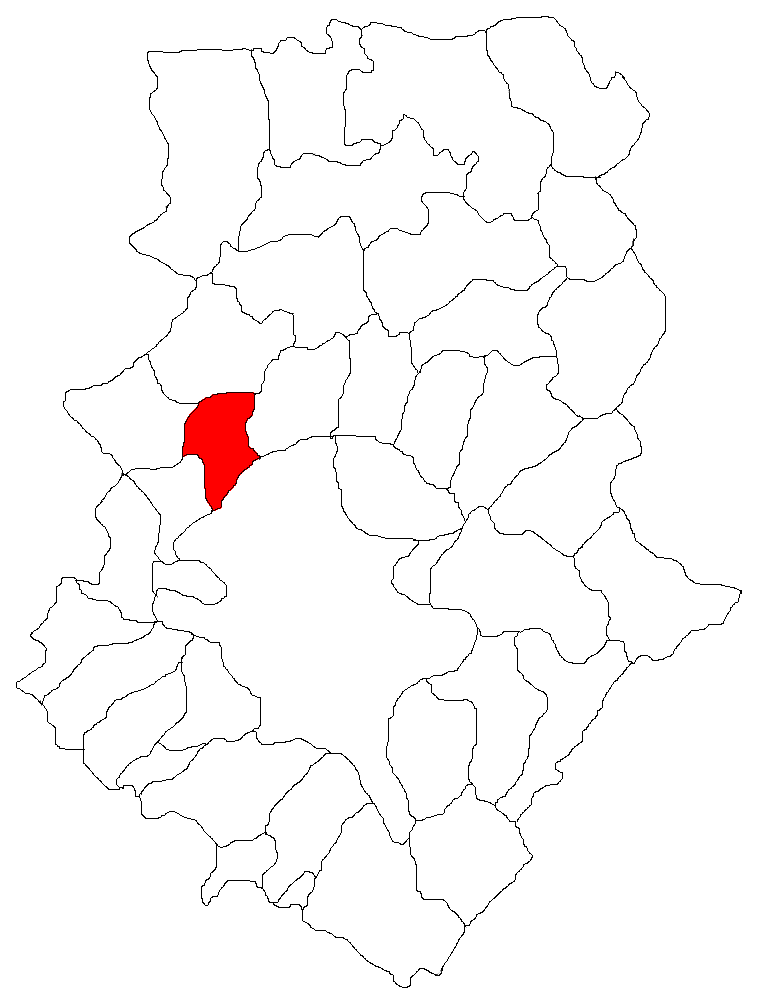
- Location in Ilfov County

- Location in Romania
- Coordinates: 44°32′N 26°0′E
- Country: Romania
- County: Ilfov

Government
  - Mayor (2024–2028): Florin-Răducu Covaci (PNL)
- Area: 26 km^{2} (10 sq mi)
- Elevation: 95 m (312 ft)
- Population (2021-12-01): 9,820
  - Density: 380/km^{2} (980/sq mi)
- Time zone: UTC+02:00 (EET)
  - Summer (DST): UTC+03:00 (EEST)
- Postal code: 077135
- Area code: +(40) 21
- Vehicle reg.: IF
- Website: primaria.mogosoaia.ro

Mogoșoaia is a commune in the west of Ilfov County, Muntenia, Romania, composed of a single village, Mogoșoaia.

In late 17th century, Constantin Brâncoveanu bought land here, and, between 1698 and 1702, he built the Mogoșoaia Palace.

The commune is situated in the Wallachian Plain, at an altitude of 95 m (312 ft), on the banks of the Colentina River, which widens here into the Lake Mogoșoaia. It is located in the central-west part of Ilfov County, in the northwestern outskirts of the national capital, about 16 km (9.9 mi) from downtown Bucharest.

Historical population
Year	Pop.	±%
2002	5,232	—
2011	7,625	+45.7%
2021	9,820	+28.8%
Source: Census data

At the 2021 census, Mogoșoaia had a population of 9,820; of those, 74.79% were Romanians, and the others of unknown ethnicity.

== Natives ==
- Raul Costin (born 1985), footballer
