= UEFA Women's Euro 2017 knockout stage =

Football tournament knockout stage

The knockout phase of UEFA Women's Euro 2017 began on 29 July 2017 and ended on 6 August 2017 with the final.

All times local (UTC+2).

== Format ==
In the knockout stage, extra time and penalty shoot-out are used to decide the winner if necessary.

On 1 June 2017, the UEFA Executive Committee agreed that the competition would be part of the International Football Association Board (IFAB)'s trial to allow a fourth substitute to be made during extra time.

== Qualified teams ==
The top two placed teams from each of the four groups, qualified for the knockout stage.

Group	Winners	Runners-up
A	Netherlands	Denmark
B	Germany	Sweden
C	Austria	France
D	England	Spain

== Bracket ==
Quarter-finals
29 July – Doetinchem
Netherlands	2
Sweden	0
30 July – Deventer
England	1
France	0
30 July – Rotterdam
Germany	1
Denmark	2
30 July – Tilburg
Austria (p)	0 (5)
Spain	0 (3)

Semi-finals
3 August – Enschede
Netherlands	3
England	0
3 August – Breda
Denmark (p)	0 (3)
Austria	0 (0)

Final
6 August – Enschede
Netherlands	4
Denmark	2

== Quarter-finals ==
=== Netherlands vs Sweden ===
29 July 2017
18:00

Netherlands	2–0	Sweden
Martens 33'; Miedema 64'	Report

De Vijverberg, Doetinchem
Attendance: 11,106
Referee: Bibiana Steinhaus (Germany)

Netherlands	Sweden

GK	1	Sari van Veenendaal
RB	2	Desiree van Lunteren
CB	6	Anouk Dekker
CB	3	Stefanie van der Gragt	(substituted off) 46'
LB	5	Kika van Es
RM	14	Jackie Groenen
CM	10	Daniëlle van de Donk
LM	8	Sherida Spitse (c)
RF	7	Shanice van de Sanden	(substituted off) 76'
CF	9	Vivianne Miedema
LF	11	Lieke Martens	(substituted off) 87'
Substitutions:
DF	4	Mandy van den Berg	(substituted in) 46'
FW	13	Renate Jansen	(substituted in) 76'
FW	21	Lineth Beerensteyn	(substituted in) 87'
Manager:
Sarina Wiegman

GK	1	Hedvig Lindahl
RB	15	Jessica Samuelsson	(yellow card) 43'
CB	5	Nilla Fischer
CB	3	Linda Sembrant
LB	2	Jonna Andersson		(substituted off) 81'
RM	8	Lotta Schelin (c)
CM	7	Lisa Dahlkvist
CM	17	Caroline Seger
LM	9	Kosovare Asllani	(yellow card) 90+2'
CF	11	Stina Blackstenius
CF	18	Fridolina Rolfö		(substituted off) 73'
Substitutions:
MF	14	Hanna Folkesson		(substituted in) 73'
FW	20	Mimmi Larsson		(substituted in) 81'
Manager:
Pia Sundhage

Player of the Match:
Jackie Groenen (Netherlands)

Assistant referees:
Katrin Rafalski (Germany)
Chrysoula Kourompylia (Greece)
Fourth official:
Carina Vitulano (Italy)

=== Germany vs Denmark ===
30 July 2017 (Note: The Germany v Denmark match, originally scheduled on 29 July 2017, 20:45 CEST, was postponed to the following day due to adverse weather conditions.)
12:00

Germany	1–2	Denmark
Kerschowski 3'	Report	Nadim 49'; T. Nielsen 83'

Sparta Stadion Het Kasteel, Rotterdam
Attendance: 5,251
Referee: Katalin Kulcsár (Hungary)

Germany	Denmark

GK	1	Almuth Schult
RB	14	Anna Blässe
CB	8	Lena Goeßling
CB	5	Babett Peter
LB	17	Isabel Kerschowski
DM	6	Kristin Demann	(substituted off) 62'
CM	15	Sara Doorsoun	(substituted off) 46'
CM	13	Sara Däbritz
AM	10	Dzsenifer Marozsán (c)
CF	11	Anja Mittag
CF	16	Linda Dallmann	(substituted off) 88'
Substitutions:
MF	20	Lina Magull	(substituted in) 46'
FW	9	Mandy Islacker	(substituted in) 62'
FW	18	Lena Petermann	(substituted in) 88'
Manager:
Steffi Jones

GK	1	Stina Lykke Petersen
RB	8	Theresa Nielsen
CB	5	Simone Boye Sørensen
CB	12	Stine Larsen
LB	2	Line Røddik Hansen	(substituted off) 69'
RM	7	Sanne Troelsgaard Nielsen
CM	17	Line Jensen
CM	4	Maja Kildemoes	(substituted off) 66'
LM	11	Katrine Veje
CF	9	Nadia Nadim
CF	10	Pernille Harder (c)
Substitutions:
FW	15	Frederikke Thøgersen	(substituted in) 66'
DF	19	Cecilie Sandvej	(substituted in) 69'
Manager:
Nils Nielsen

Player of the Match:
Theresa Nielsen (Denmark)

Assistant referees:
Judit Kulcsár (Hungary)
Petruta Iugulescu (Romania)
Fourth official:
Lorraine Clark (Scotland)

=== Austria vs Spain ===
30 July 2017
18:00

Austria	0–0 (a.e.t.)	Spain
	Report
Penalties
Feiersinger (penalty scored); Burger (penalty scored); Aschauer (penalty scored); Pinther (penalty scored); Puntigam (penalty scored)	5–3	(penalty scored) García; (penalty scored) Sampedro; (penalty missed) Meseguer; (penalty scored) Corredera

Koning Willem II Stadion, Tilburg
Attendance: 3,488
Referee: Stéphanie Frappart (France)

Austria	Spain

GK	1	Manuela Zinsberger
RB	6	Katharina Schiechtl
CB	7	Carina Wenninger	(yellow card) 75'
CB	11	Viktoria Schnaderbeck (c)
LB	19	Verena Aschauer	(yellow card) 119'
CM	9	Sarah Zadrazil		(substituted off) 110'
CM	17	Sarah Puntigam
CM	15	Nicole Billa		(substituted off) 81'
RF	18	Laura Feiersinger
CF	10	Nina Burger
LF	20	Lisa Makas		(substituted off) 42'
Substitutions:
MF	8	Nadine Prohaska		(substituted in) 42'
DF	13	Virginia Kirchberger		(substituted in) 81'
FW	4	Viktoria Pinther		(substituted in) 110'
Manager:
Dominik Thalhammer

GK	13	Sandra Paños
RB	7	Marta Corredera
CB	3	Marta Torrejón (c)	(yellow card) 88'
CB	4	Irene Paredes
LB	20	María Pilar León	(yellow card) 30'
CM	14	Victoria Losada		(substituted off) 68'
CM	15	Silvia Meseguer
CM	8	Amanda Sampedro
RF	19	Bárbara Latorre		(substituted off) 76'
CF	9	Mari Paz Vilas		(substituted off) 112'
LF	22	Mariona Caldentey		(substituted off) 56'
Substitutions:
FW	17	Olga García		(substituted in) 56'
MF	11	Alexia Putellas		(substituted in) 68'
FW	10	Jennifer Hermoso		(substituted in) 76'
MF	6	Virginia Torrecilla		(substituted in) 112'
Manager:
Jorge Vilda

Player of the Match:
Laura Feiersinger (Austria)

Assistant referees:
Manuela Nicolosi (France)
Sian Massey (England)
Fourth official:
Monika Mularczyk (Poland)

=== England vs France ===
30 July 2017
20:45

England	1–0	France
Taylor 60'	Report

De Adelaarshorst, Deventer
Attendance: 6,283
Referee: Esther Staubli (Switzerland)

England	France

GK	1	Karen Bardsley		(substituted off) 75'
RB	2	Lucy Bronze
CB	5	Steph Houghton (c)
CB	16	Millie Bright
LB	3	Demi Stokes
CM	11	Jade Moore
CM	4	Jill Scott	(yellow card) 33'
RW	7	Jordan Nobbs
AM	23	Fran Kirby
LW	18	Ellen White
CF	9	Jodie Taylor	(yellow card) 62'
Substitutions:
GK	13	Siobhan Chamberlain		(substituted in) 75'
Manager:
(Wales) Mark Sampson

GK	16	Sarah Bouhaddi
RB	8	Jessica Houara
CB	4	Laura Georges
CB	19	Griedge Mbock Bathy	(yellow card) 81'
LB	22	Sakina Karchaoui
RM	20	Kadidiatou Diani		(substituted off) 65'
CM	23	Onema Geyoro
CM	6	Amandine Henry (c)
LM	10	Camille Abily		(substituted off) 78'
CF	18	Marie-Laure Delie		(substituted off) 90'
CF	9	Eugénie Le Sommer
Substitutions:
FW	12	Élodie Thomis		(substituted in) 65'
MF	11	Claire Lavogez		(substituted in) 78'
FW	7	Clarisse Le Bihan		(substituted in) 90'
Manager:
Olivier Echouafni

Player of the Match:
Amandine Henry (France)

Assistant referees:
Belinda Brem (Switzerland)
Sanja Rodjak Karšić (Croatia)
Fourth official:
Lina Lehtovaara (Finland)

== Semi-finals ==
=== Denmark vs Austria ===
3 August 2017
18:00

Denmark	0–0 (a.e.t.)	Austria
	Report
Penalties
Nadim (penalty scored); Harder (penalty scored); Junge (penalty missed); Boye Sørensen (penalty scored)	3–0	(penalty missed) Feiersinger; (penalty missed) Pinther; (penalty missed) Aschauer

Rat Verlegh Stadion, Breda
Attendance: 11,312
Referee: Kateryna Monzul (Ukraine)

Denmark	Austria

GK	1	Stina Lykke Petersen
RB	8	Theresa Nielsen
CB	5	Simone Boye Sørensen
CB	12	Stine Larsen
LB	2	Line Røddik Hansen		(substituted off) 46'
RM	7	Sanne Troelsgaard Nielsen
CM	4	Maja Kildemoes	(yellow card) 36'	(substituted off) 52'
CM	17	Line Jensen		(substituted off) 69'
LM	11	Katrine Veje		(substituted off) 120+1'
CF	9	Nadia Nadim
CF	10	Pernille Harder (c)	(yellow card) 80'
Substitutions:
DF	19	Cecilie Sandvej		(substituted in) 46'
DF	15	Frederikke Thøgersen		(substituted in) 52'
MF	13	Sofie Junge Pedersen		(substituted in) 69'
FW	14	Nicoline Sørensen		(substituted in) 120+1'
Manager:
Nils Nielsen

GK	1	Manuela Zinsberger
CB	6	Katharina Schiechtl	(yellow card) 56'
CB	7	Carina Wenninger
CB	13	Virginia Kirchberger
RM	18	Laura Feiersinger
CM	11	Viktoria Schnaderbeck (c)
CM	17	Sarah Puntigam		(substituted off) 91'
LM	19	Verena Aschauer
AM	9	Sarah Zadrazil	(yellow card) 97'
CF	10	Nina Burger
CF	15	Nicole Billa		(substituted off) 39'
Substitutions:
MF	8	Nadine Prohaska		(substituted in) 39'
FW	4	Viktoria Pinther		(substituted in) 91'
Manager:
Dominik Thalhammer

Player of the Match:
Stina Lykke Petersen (Denmark)

Assistant referees:
Maryna Striletska (Ukraine)
Petruta Iugulescu (Romania)
Fourth official:
Katalin Kulcsár (Hungary)

=== Netherlands vs England ===
3 August 2017
20:45

Netherlands	3–0	England
Miedema 22'; Van de Donk 62'; Bright 90+3' (o.g.)	Report

De Grolsch Veste, Enschede
Attendance: 27,093
Referee: Stéphanie Frappart (France)

Netherlands	England

GK	1	Sari van Veenendaal
RB	2	Desiree van Lunteren	(yellow card) 13'
CB	6	Anouk Dekker
CB	3	Stefanie van der Gragt		(substituted off) 70'
LB	5	Kika van Es
RM	14	Jackie Groenen
CM	10	Daniëlle van de Donk	(yellow card) 59'	(substituted off) 90+1'
LM	8	Sherida Spitse (c)
RF	7	Shanice van de Sanden		(substituted off) 89'
CF	9	Vivianne Miedema
LF	11	Lieke Martens
Substitutions:
DF	17	Kelly Zeeman		(substituted in) 70'
FW	13	Renate Jansen		(substituted in) 89'
MF	12	Jill Roord		(substituted in) 90+1'
Manager:
Sarina Wiegman

GK	13	Siobhan Chamberlain
RB	2	Lucy Bronze
CB	5	Steph Houghton (c)
CB	16	Millie Bright	(yellow card) 15'
LB	3	Demi Stokes
CM	11	Jade Moore	(yellow card) 47'	(substituted off) 76'
CM	10	Fara Williams		(substituted off) 67'
RW	7	Jordan Nobbs
AM	23	Fran Kirby
LW	18	Ellen White
CF	9	Jodie Taylor
Substitutions:
FW	19	Toni Duggan		(substituted in) 67'
MF	14	Karen Carney		(substituted in) 76'
Manager:
(Wales) Mark Sampson

Player of the Match:
Daniëlle van de Donk (Netherlands)

Assistant referees:
Manuela Nicolosi (France)
Chrysoula Kourompylia (Greece)
Fourth official:
Bibiana Steinhaus (Germany)

== Final ==
6 August 2017
17:00

Netherlands	4–2	Denmark
Miedema 10', 89'; Martens 28'; Spitse 51'	Report	Nadim 6' (pen.); Harder 33'

De Grolsch Veste, Enschede
Attendance: 28,182
Referee: Esther Staubli (Switzerland)

Netherlands	Denmark

GK	1	Sari van Veenendaal
RB	2	Desiree van Lunteren		(substituted off) 57'
CB	6	Anouk Dekker	(yellow card) 43'
CB	3	Stefanie van der Gragt	(yellow card) 72'
LB	5	Kika van Es		(substituted off) 90+4'
CM	14	Jackie Groenen	(yellow card) 21'
CM	10	Daniëlle van de Donk
CM	8	Sherida Spitse (c)
RF	7	Shanice van de Sanden		(substituted off) 90'
CF	9	Vivianne Miedema
LF	11	Lieke Martens
Substitutions:
DF	20	Dominique Janssen		(substituted in) 57'
FW	13	Renate Jansen		(substituted in) 90'
DF	4	Mandy van den Berg		(substituted in) 90+4'
Manager:
Sarina Wiegman

GK	1	Stina Lykke Petersen
RB	8	Theresa Nielsen
CB	5	Simone Boye Sørensen		(substituted off) 77'
CB	12	Stine Larsen
LB	19	Cecilie Sandvej
RM	7	Sanne Troelsgaard Nielsen
CM	4	Maja Kildemoes		(substituted off) 61'
CM	13	Sofie Junge Pedersen		(substituted off) 82'
LM	11	Katrine Veje
CF	10	Pernille Harder (c)
CF	9	Nadia Nadim	(yellow card) 45'
Substitutions:
DF	15	Frederikke Thøgersen		(substituted in) 61'
DF	2	Line Røddik Hansen		(substituted in) 77'
MF	6	Nanna Christiansen		(substituted in) 82'
Manager:
Nils Nielsen

Player of the Match:
Sherida Spitse (Netherlands)

Assistant referees:
Belinda Brem (Switzerland)
Sanja Rodjak Karšić (Croatia)
Fourth official:
Bibiana Steinhaus (Germany)
Fifth official:
Katrin Rafalski (Germany)
