= UEFA Women's Euro 2017 Group C =

Football tournament group stage

Group C of UEFA Women's Euro 2017 contained Austria, France, Iceland and Switzerland. The matches were played from 18 to 26 July 2017.

== Teams ==
Draw position	Team	Method of qualification	Date of qualification	Finals appearance	Last appearance	Previous best performance	UEFA ranking for final draw	FIFA ranking at start of event
C1	France	Group 3 winners	11 April 2016	6th	2013	Quarter-finals (2009, 2013)	2	3
C2	Iceland	Group 1 winners	16 September 2016	3rd	2013	Quarter-finals (2013)	10	19
C3	Austria	Group 8 runners-up	20 September 2016	1st	—	Debut	13	24
C4	Switzerland	Group 6 winners	4 June 2016	1st	—	Debut	7	17

== Standings ==
Pos	Team	Pld	W	D	L	GF	GA	GD	Pts	Qualification
1	Austria	3	2	1	0	5	1	+4	7	Knockout stage
2	France	3	1	2	0	3	2	+1	5	Knockout stage
3	Switzerland	3	1	1	1	3	3	0	4	
4	Iceland	3	0	0	3	1	6	−5	0	

Source: UEFA
Rules for classification: Group stage tiebreakers

In the quarter-finals:

- The winners of Group C, Austria, advance to play the runners-up of Group D, Spain.
- The runners-up of Group C, France, advance to play the winners of Group D, England.

== Matches ==
All times are local (UTC+2).

=== Austria vs Switzerland ===
18 July 2017
18:00

Austria	1–0	Switzerland
Burger 15'	Report

De Adelaarshorst, Deventer
Attendance: 4,781
Referee: Bibiana Steinhaus (Germany)

Austria	Switzerland

GK	1	Manuela Zinsberger
RB	6	Katharina Schiechtl		(substituted off) 77'
CB	7	Carina Wenninger
CB	13	Virginia Kirchberger	(yellow card) 55'
LB	19	Verena Aschauer
DM	17	Sarah Puntigam
RM	18	Laura Feiersinger
CM	9	Sarah Zadrazil
CM	15	Nicole Billa		(substituted off) 83'
LM	20	Lisa Makas		(substituted off) 39'
CF	10	Nina Burger (c)	(yellow card) 71'
Substitutions:
MF	8	Nadine Prohaska		(substituted on) 39'
DF	11	Viktoria Schnaderbeck		(substituted on) 77'
FW	4	Viktoria Pinther		(substituted on) 83'
Manager:
Dominik Thalhammer

GK	1	Gaëlle Thalmann
RB	9	Ana-Maria Crnogorčević
CB	14	Rahel Kiwic	(red card) 60'
CB	15	Caroline Abbé (c)	(yellow card) 19'	(substituted off) 57'
LB	5	Noelle Maritz
RM	6	Géraldine Reuteler		(substituted off) 62'
CM	13	Lia Wälti
CM	7	Martina Moser
LM	11	Lara Dickenmann
CF	10	Ramona Bachmann
CF	16	Fabienne Humm		(substituted off) 57'
Substitutions:
FW	19	Eseosa Aigbogun		(substituted on) 57'
MF	22	Vanessa Bernauer		(substituted on) 57'
DF	2	Jana Brunner		(substituted on) 62'
Manager:
(Germany) Martina Voss-Tecklenburg

Player of the Match:
Sarah Puntigam (Austria)

Assistant referees:
Sian Massey (England)
Katrin Rafalski (Germany)
Fourth official:
Lorraine Clark (Scotland)

=== France vs Iceland ===
18 July 2017
20:45

France	1–0	Iceland
Le Sommer 86' (pen.)	Report

Koning Willem II Stadion, Tilburg
Attendance: 4,894
Referee: Carina Vitulano (Italy)

France	Iceland

GK	16	Sarah Bouhaddi
RB	8	Jessica Houara
CB	4	Laura Georges
CB	3	Wendie Renard (c)	(yellow card) 18'
LB	22	Sakina Karchaoui
DM	6	Amandine Henry
CM	10	Camille Abily
CM	15	Élise Bussaglia		(substituted off) 64'
RW	12	Élodie Thomis		(substituted off) 77'
LW	7	Clarisse Le Bihan		(substituted off) 43'
CF	9	Eugénie Le Sommer
Substitutions:
FW	20	Kadidiatou Diani		(substituted on) 43'
MF	17	Gaëtane Thiney		(substituted on) 64'
FW	18	Marie-Laure Delie		(substituted on) 77'
Manager:
Olivier Echouafni

GK	1	Guðbjörg Gunnarsdóttir
CB	4	Glódís Perla Viggósdóttir
CB	2	Sif Atladóttir
CB	3	Ingibjörg Sigurðardóttir	(yellow card) 34'
RM	5	Gunnhildur Yrsa Jónsdóttir
CM	7	Sara Björk Gunnarsdóttir (c)
CM	8	Sigríður Lára Garðarsdóttir		(substituted off) 75'
LM	11	Hallbera Guðný Gísladóttir
RF	17	Agla María Albertsdóttir	(yellow card) 54'	(substituted off) 61'
CF	10	Dagný Brynjarsdóttir
LF	23	Fanndís Friðriksdóttir		(substituted off) 82'
Substitutions:
MF	9	Katrín Ásbjörnsdóttir		(substituted on) 61'
FW	16	Harpa Þorsteinsdóttir		(substituted on) 75'
FW	15	Elín Jensen		(substituted on) 82'
Manager:
Freyr Alexandersson

Player of the Match:
Wendie Renard (France)

Assistant referees:
Svetlana Bilić (Serbia)
Lucia Abruzzese (Italy)
Fourth official:
Kateryna Monzul (Ukraine)

=== Iceland vs Switzerland ===
22 July 2017
18:00

Iceland	1–2	Switzerland
Friðriksdóttir 33'	Report	Dickenmann 43'; Bachmann 52'

De Vijverberg, Doetinchem
Attendance: 5,647
Referee: Anastasia Pustovoitova (Russia)

Iceland	Switzerland

GK	1	Guðbjörg Gunnarsdóttir
CB	4	Glódís Perla Viggósdóttir
CB	2	Sif Atladóttir
CB	3	Ingibjörg Sigurðardóttir
RM	5	Gunnhildur Yrsa Jónsdóttir	(yellow card) 44'	(substituted off) 83'
CM	7	Sara Björk Gunnarsdóttir (c)
CM	8	Sigríður Lára Garðarsdóttir		(substituted off) 88'
LM	11	Hallbera Guðný Gísladóttir
RF	9	Katrín Ásbjörnsdóttir		(substituted off) 66'
CF	10	Dagný Brynjarsdóttir
LF	23	Fanndís Friðriksdóttir
Substitutions:
FW	17	Agla María Albertsdóttir		(substituted on) 66'
MF	6	Hólmfríður Magnúsdóttir		(substituted on) 83'
FW	16	Harpa Þorsteinsdóttir		(substituted on) 88'
Manager:
Freyr Alexandersson

GK	1	Gaëlle Thalmann
RB	9	Ana-Maria Crnogorčević
CB	2	Jana Brunner
CB	13	Lia Wälti
LB	5	Noelle Maritz
RM	8	Cinzia Zehnder
CM	7	Martina Moser		(substituted off) 57'
CM	22	Vanessa Bernauer
LM	11	Lara Dickenmann (c)	(yellow card) 7'
CF	23	Vanessa Bürki		(substituted off) 76'
CF	10	Ramona Bachmann		(substituted off) 90+10'
Substitutions:
FW	19	Eseosa Aigbogun		(substituted on) 57'
FW	16	Fabienne Humm		(substituted on) 76'
DF	4	Rachel Rinast		(substituted on) 90+10'
Manager:
(Germany) Martina Voss-Tecklenburg

Player of the Match:
Ramona Bachmann (Switzerland)

Assistant referees:
Ekaterina Kurochkina (Russia)
Svetlana Bilić (Serbia)
Fourth official:
Lorraine Clark (Scotland)

=== France vs Austria ===
22 July 2017
20:45

France	1–1	Austria
Henry 51'	Report	Makas 27'

Stadion Galgenwaard, Utrecht
Attendance: 4,387
Referee: Jana Adámková (Czech Republic)

France	Austria

GK	16	Sarah Bouhaddi
RB	8	Jessica Houara	(yellow card) 44'	(substituted off) 63'
CB	19	Griedge Mbock Bathy
CB	3	Wendie Renard (c)
LB	2	Eve Perisset
CM	23	Onema Geyoro
CM	6	Amandine Henry
CM	15	Élise Bussaglia		(substituted off) 78'
RF	18	Marie-Laure Delie
CF	17	Gaëtane Thiney		(substituted off) 70'
LF	9	Eugénie Le Sommer
Substitutions:
DF	22	Sakina Karchaoui		(substituted on) 63'
FW	20	Kadidiatou Diani		(substituted on) 70'
MF	10	Camille Abily		(substituted on) 78'
Manager:
Olivier Echouafni

GK	1	Manuela Zinsberger
CB	6	Katharina Schiechtl
CB	7	Carina Wenninger
CB	13	Virginia Kirchberger
RM	18	Laura Feiersinger	(yellow card) 20'
CM	11	Viktoria Schnaderbeck (c)
CM	17	Sarah Puntigam
LM	19	Verena Aschauer
AM	15	Nicole Billa		(substituted off) 85'
CF	10	Nina Burger		(substituted off) 75'
CF	20	Lisa Makas		(substituted off) 69'
Substitutions:
MF	8	Nadine Prohaska		(substituted on) 69'
FW	4	Viktoria Pinther		(substituted on) 75'
MF	16	Jasmin Eder		(substituted on) 85'
Manager:
Dominik Thalhammer

Player of the Match:
Nicole Billa (Austria)

Assistant referees:
Lucie Ratajová (Czech Republic)
Maria Sukenikova (Slovakia)
Fourth official:
Bibiana Steinhaus (Germany)

=== Switzerland vs France ===
26 July 2017
20:45

Switzerland	1–1	France
Crnogorčević 19'	Report	Abily 76'

Rat Verlegh Stadion, Breda
Attendance: 3,347
Referee: Katalin Kulcsár (Hungary)

Switzerland	France

GK	1	Gaëlle Thalmann
RB	9	Ana-Maria Crnogorčević
CB	14	Rahel Kiwic
CB	13	Lia Wälti
LB	5	Noelle Maritz
RM	8	Cinzia Zehnder		(substituted off) 79'
CM	22	Vanessa Bernauer	(yellow card) 66'
CM	7	Martina Moser		(substituted off) 65'
LM	11	Lara Dickenmann (c)	(yellow card) 72'
CF	10	Ramona Bachmann
CF	19	Eseosa Aigbogun		(substituted off) 79'
Substitutions:
DF	18	Viola Calligaris	(yellow card) 68'	(substituted on) 65'
FW	3	Meriame Terchoun		(substituted on) 79'
DF	6	Géraldine Reuteler		(substituted on) 79'
Manager:
(Germany) Martina Voss-Tecklenburg

GK	16	Sarah Bouhaddi
RB	2	Eve Perisset	(red card) 17'
CB	19	Griedge Mbock Bathy
CB	3	Wendie Renard (c)	(yellow card) 14'
LB	22	Sakina Karchaoui
CM	6	Amandine Henry	(yellow card) 43'
CM	10	Camille Abily		(substituted off) 87'
CM	23	Onema Geyoro
AM	20	Kadidiatou Diani		(substituted off) 83'
AM	11	Claire Lavogez		(substituted off) 71'
CF	9	Eugénie Le Sommer
Substitutions:
FW	18	Marie-Laure Delie		(substituted on) 71'
DF	20	Jessica Houara		(substituted on) 83'
MF	17	Gaëtane Thiney		(substituted on) 87'
Manager:
Olivier Echouafni

Player of the Match:
Ramona Bachmann (Switzerland)

Assistant referees:
Judit Kulcsár (Hungary)
Ekaterina Kurochkina (Russia)
Fourth official:
Bibiana Steinhaus (Germany)

=== Iceland vs Austria ===
26 July 2017
20:45

Iceland	0–3	Austria
	Report	Zadrazil 36'; Burger 44'; Enzinger 89'

Sparta Stadion Het Kasteel, Rotterdam
Attendance: 4,893
Referee: Riem Hussein (Germany)

Iceland	Austria

GK	1	Guðbjörg Gunnarsdóttir
CB	4	Glódís Perla Viggósdóttir
CB	2	Sif Atladóttir
CB	19	Anna Björk Kristjánsdóttir	(yellow card) 48'
RM	6	Hólmfríður Magnúsdóttir		(substituted off) 51'
CM	10	Dagný Brynjarsdóttir
CM	7	Sara Björk Gunnarsdóttir (c)
LM	11	Hallbera Guðný Gísladóttir
RF	17	Agla María Albertsdóttir		(substituted off) 83'
CF	16	Harpa Þorsteinsdóttir		(substituted off) 71'
LF	23	Fanndís Friðriksdóttir
Substitutions:
MF	5	Gunnhildur Yrsa Jónsdóttir		(substituted on) 51'
FW	20	Berglind Björg Þorvaldsdóttir		(substituted on) 71'
MF	18	Sandra Jessen		(substituted on) 83'
Manager:
Freyr Alexandersson

GK	1	Manuela Zinsberger
RB	6	Katharina Schiechtl
CB	7	Carina Wenninger
CB	13	Virginia Kirchberger
LB	19	Verena Aschauer
CM	9	Sarah Zadrazil	(yellow card) 54'	(substituted off) 72'
CM	17	Sarah Puntigam
RW	18	Laura Feiersinger
AM	15	Nicole Billa		(substituted off) 86'
LW	20	Lisa Makas		(substituted off) 56'
CF	10	Nina Burger (c)
Substitutions:
MF	8	Nadine Prohaska		(substituted on) 56'
DF	11	Viktoria Schnaderbeck		(substituted on) 72'
FW	12	Stefanie Enzinger		(substituted on) 86'
Manager:
Dominik Thalhammer

Player of the Match:
Nina Burger (Austria)

Assistant referees:
Christina Biehl (Germany)
Chrysoula Kourompylia (Greece)
Fourth official:
Stéphanie Frappart (France)
