= Austria at the UEFA Women's Championship =

Austria have participated 2 times at the UEFA Women's Championship: Their best achievement is reaching the UEFA Women's Championships semi final in (2017).

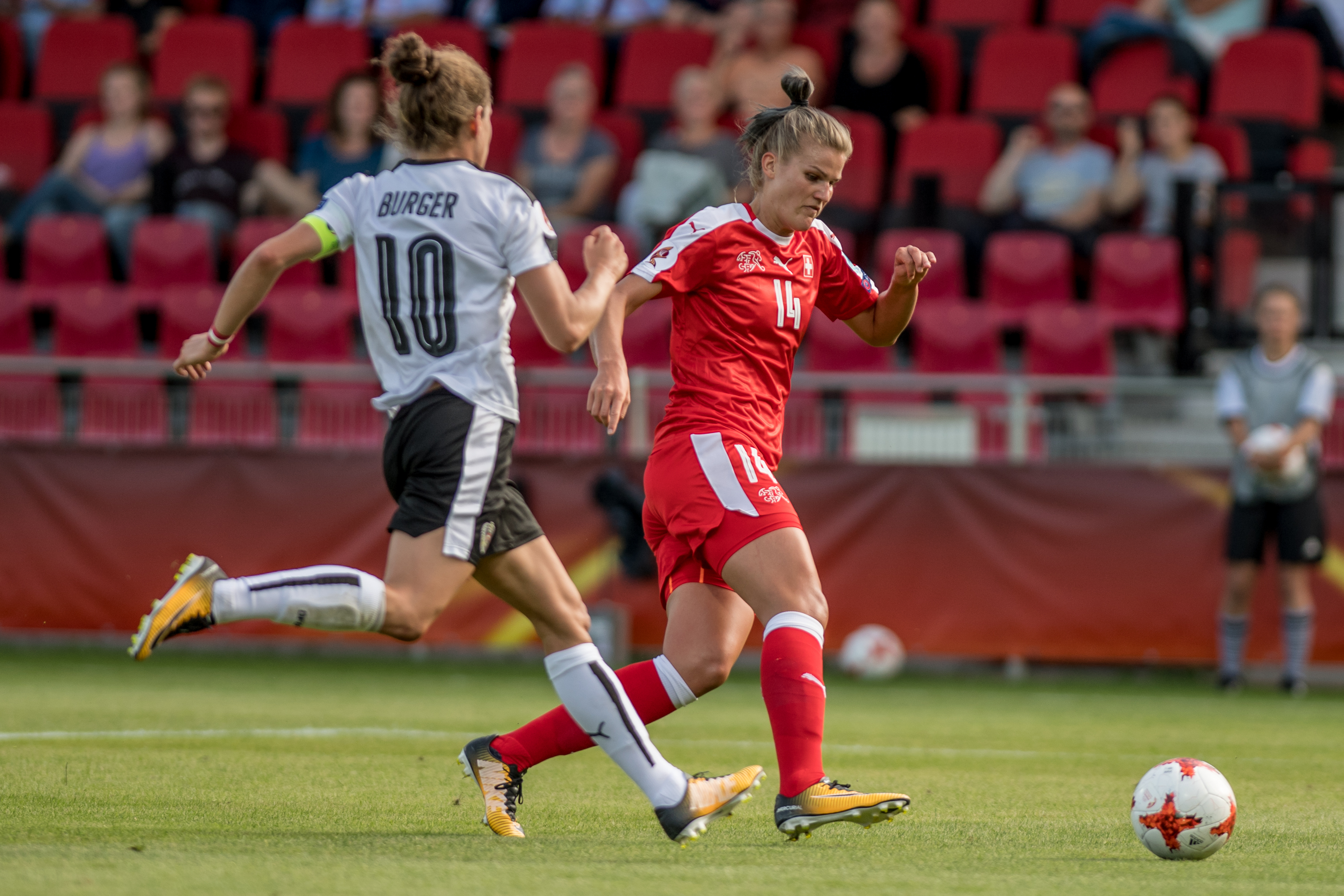
Scene from the game against Switzerland with Nina Burger and Rahel Kiwic (SUI).

== UEFA Women's Championship ==
UEFA Women's Championship record										Qualification record							
Year	Result	Position	Pld	W	D*	L	GF	GA	Squad	Pld	W	D	L	GF	GA		
1984	Did not enter									Did not enter							
(Norway) 1987	Did not enter									Did not enter							
(West Germany) 1989	Did not enter									Did not enter							
(Denmark) 1991	Did not enter									Did not enter							
(Italy) 1993	Did not enter									Did not enter							
(Germany) 1995	Did not enter									Did not enter							
(Norway) (Sweden) 1997	Did not qualify									6	3	1	2	8	12		
(Germany) 2001	Did not qualify									6	1	1	4	6	14		
(England) 2005	Did not qualify									6	5	0	1	31	4		
(Finland) 2009	Did not qualify									8	3	0	5	13	18		
(Sweden) 2013	Did not qualify									10	6	2	2	17	12		
(Netherlands) 2017	Semi-finals	3rd	5	2	3	0	5	1	Squad	8	5	2	1	18	4		
(England) 2022	Quarter-finals	7th	4	2	0	2	3	3	Squad	8	6	1	1	22	3		
(Switzerland) 2025	Did not qualify									10	4	1	5	15	15	(Note: From Euro 2025 onwards a new qualifying format was introduced, linked to the Women's Nations League where teams are divided into leagues with promotion/relegation between the leagues at the end of each cycle.)	11th
(Germany) 2029																	
Total	Semi-finals	2/13	9	4	3	2	8	4	—	52	29	7	16	115	67		

*Draws include knockout matches decided on penalty kicks.

== Euro 2017 ==
=== Group C ===
Pos	Team	Pld	W	D	L	GF	GA	GD	Pts	Qualification
1	Austria	3	2	1	0	5	1	+4	7	Knockout stage
2	France	3	1	2	0	3	2	+1	5	Knockout stage
3	Switzerland	3	1	1	1	3	3	0	4	
4	Iceland	3	0	0	3	1	6	−5	0	

Source: UEFA
Rules for classification: Group stage tiebreakers
18 July 2017
18:00

Austria	1–0	Switzerland
Burger 15'	Report

De Adelaarshorst, Deventer
Attendance: 4,781
Referee: Bibiana Steinhaus (Germany)

22 July 2017
20:45

France	1–1	Austria
Henry 51'	Report	Makas 27'

Stadion Galgenwaard, Utrecht
Attendance: 4,387
Referee: Jana Adámková (Czech Republic)

26 July 2017
20:45

Iceland	0–3	Austria
	Report	Zadrazil 36'; Burger 44'; Enzinger 89'

Sparta Stadion Het Kasteel, Rotterdam
Attendance: 4,893
Referee: Riem Hussein (Germany)

=== Quarter-finals ===
30 July 2017
18:00

Austria	0–0 (a.e.t.)	Spain
	Report
Penalties
Feiersinger (penalty scored); Burger (penalty scored); Aschauer (penalty scored); Pinther (penalty scored); Puntigam (penalty scored)	5–3	(penalty scored) García; (penalty scored) Sampedro; (penalty missed) Meseguer; (penalty scored) Corredera

Koning Willem II Stadion, Tilburg
Attendance: 3,488
Referee: Stéphanie Frappart (France)

=== Semi-finals ===
3 August 2017
18:00

Denmark	0–0 (a.e.t.)	Austria
	Report
Penalties
Nadim (penalty scored); Harder (penalty scored); Junge (penalty missed); Boye Sørensen (penalty scored)	3–0	(penalty missed) Feiersinger; (penalty missed) Pinther; (penalty missed) Aschauer

Rat Verlegh Stadion, Breda
Attendance: 11,312
Referee: Kateryna Monzul (Ukraine)

== Euro 2022 ==
=== Group A ===
Pos	Team	Pld	W	D	L	GF	GA	GD	Pts	Qualification
1	England (H)	3	3	0	0	14	0	+14	9	Advance to knockout stage
2	Austria	3	2	0	1	3	1	+2	6	Advance to knockout stage
3	Norway	3	1	0	2	4	10	−6	3	
4	Northern Ireland	3	0	0	3	1	11	−10	0	

Source: UEFA
(H) Hosts
6 July 2022
20:00

England	1–0	Austria
Mead 16'	Report

Old Trafford, Manchester
Attendance: 68,871
Referee: Marta Huerta de Aza (Spain)

11 July 2022
17:00

Austria	2–0	Northern Ireland
Schiechtl 19'; Naschenweng 88'	Report

St Mary's Stadium, Southampton
Attendance: 9,268
Referee: Emikar Calderas Barrera (Venezuela)

15 July 2022
20:00

Austria	1–0	Norway
Billa 37'	Report

Falmer Stadium, Brighton and Hove
Attendance: 12,667
Referee: Kateryna Monzul (Ukraine)

=== Quarter-finals ===
21 July 2022
20:00

Germany	2–0	Austria
Magull 25'; Popp 90'	Report

Brentford Community Stadium, London
Attendance: 16,025
Referee: Rebecca Welch (England)

== Head-to-head record ==
Opponent	Pld	W	D	L	GF	GA	GD	Win %
Denmark	1	0	1	0	0	0	+0	0.00
England	1	0	0	1	0	1	−1	0.00
France	1	0	1	0	1	1	+0	0.00
Germany	1	0	0	1	0	2	−2	0.00
Iceland	1	1	0	0	3	0	+3	100.00
Northern Ireland	1	1	0	0	2	0	+2	100.00
Norway	1	1	0	0	1	0	+1	100.00
Spain	1	0	1	0	0	0	+0	0.00
Switzerland	1	1	0	0	1	0	+1	100.00
Total	9	4	3	2	8	4	+4	44.44
