= UEFA Women's Euro 2017 final =

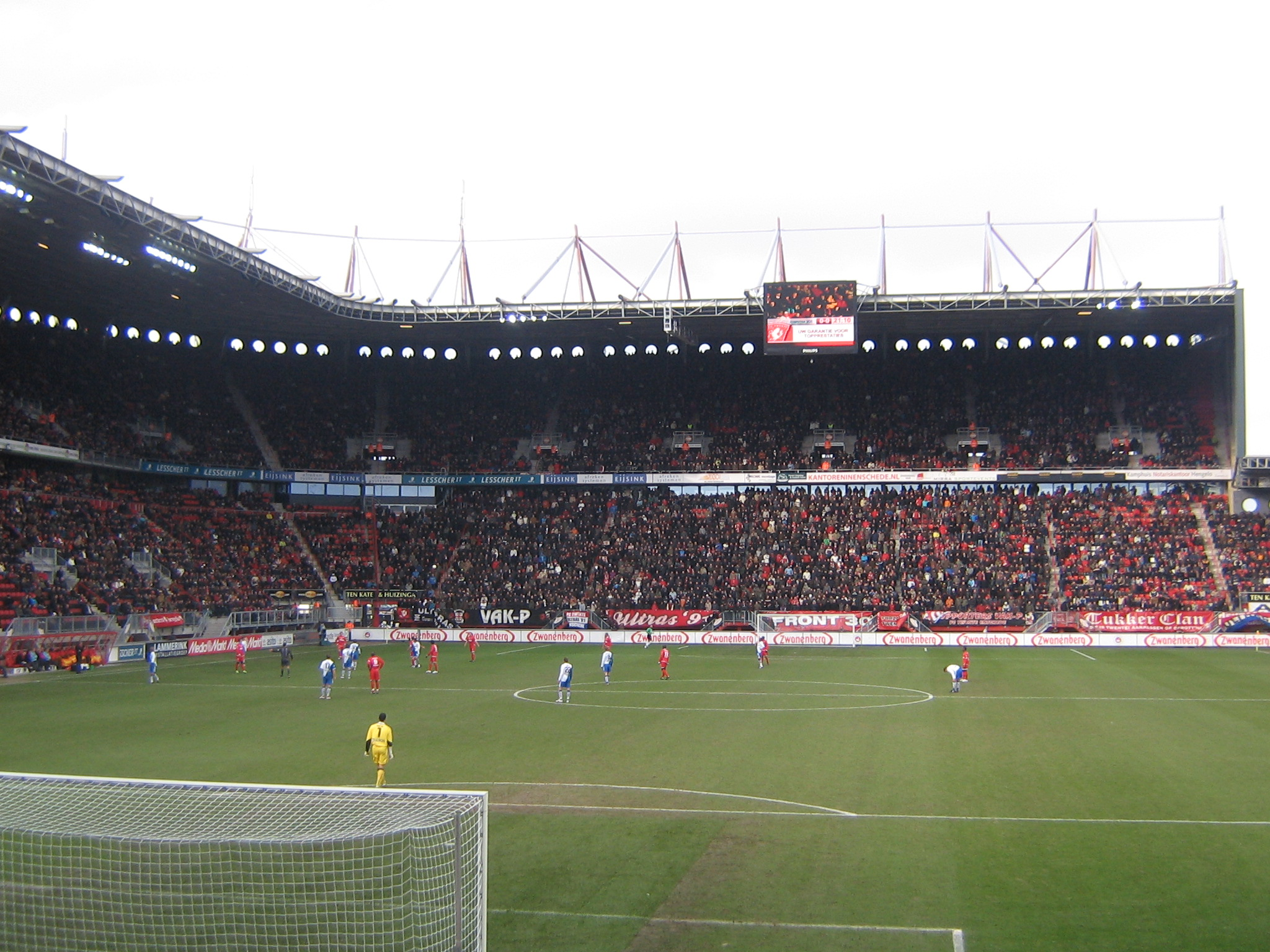
- De Grolsch Veste in Enschede hosted the final.
- Event: UEFA Women's Euro 2017
Netherlands	Denmark
(Netherlands)	(Denmark)
4	2
- Date: 6 August 2017
- Venue: De Grolsch Veste, Enschede
- Player of the Match: Sherida Spitse (Netherlands)
- Referee: Esther Staubli (Switzerland)
- Attendance: 28,182
- Weather: Partly cloudy 20 °C (68 °F); 44% humidity

The final of UEFA Women's Euro 2017 took place on 6 August 2017 at De Grolsch Veste in Enschede, Netherlands, and was contested by the winners of the semi-finals, the Netherlands and Denmark.

The Netherlands won the final 4–2 for their first UEFA Women's Championship title.

== Background ==
Both the Netherlands and Denmark reached the UEFA Women's Championship final for the first time in their histories. For the first time since 1993, a country other than Germany won the competition. Apart from Germany, only two other countries had won the championship up to this point: Norway and Sweden. Norway was defeated by both the Netherlands and Denmark in the preliminary round whereas Sweden was defeated by the Netherlands in the quarter-finals.

The finalists met each other in the group stage of the tournament, with the Netherlands winning 1–0 via a penalty from Sherida Spitse.

== Route to the final ==
Netherlands
Round
Denmark
Opponents
Result
Group stage
Opponents
Result
Norway
1–0
Match 1
Belgium
1–0
Denmark
1–0
Match 2
Netherlands
0–1
Belgium
2–1
Match 3
Norway
1–0
Group A winner

Pos	Team	Pld	Pts
1	Netherlands (H)	3	9
2	Denmark	3	6
3	Belgium	3	3
4	Norway	3	0

Source: UEFA
(H) Hosts
Final standings
Group A runner-up

Pos	Team	Pld	Pts
1	Netherlands (H)	3	9
2	Denmark	3	6
3	Belgium	3	3
4	Norway	3	0

Source: UEFA
(H) Hosts
Opponents
Result
Knockout stage
Opponents
Result
Sweden
2–0
Quarter-finals
Germany
2–1
England
3–0
Semi-finals
Austria
0–0 (a.e.t.) (3–0 p)

== Match ==
=== Details ===
6 August 2017
17:00 CEST

Netherlands	4–2	Denmark
Miedema 10', 89'; Martens 28'; Spitse 51'	Report	Nadim 6' (pen.); Harder 33'

De Grolsch Veste, Enschede
Attendance: 28,182
Referee: Esther Staubli (Switzerland)

Netherlands	Denmark

GK	1	Sari van Veenendaal
RB	2	Desiree van Lunteren		(substituted off) 57'
CB	6	Anouk Dekker	(yellow card) 43'
CB	3	Stefanie van der Gragt	(yellow card) 72'
LB	5	Kika van Es		(substituted off) 90+4'
CM	14	Jackie Groenen	(yellow card) 21'
CM	10	Daniëlle van de Donk
CM	8	Sherida Spitse (c)
RF	7	Shanice van de Sanden		(substituted off) 90'
CF	9	Vivianne Miedema
LF	11	Lieke Martens
Substitutions:
DF	20	Dominique Janssen		(substituted on) 57'
FW	13	Renate Jansen		(substituted on) 90'
DF	4	Mandy van den Berg		(substituted on) 90+4'
Manager:
Sarina Wiegman

GK	1	Stina Lykke Petersen
RB	8	Theresa Nielsen
CB	5	Simone Boye Sørensen		(substituted off) 77'
CB	12	Stine Larsen
LB	19	Cecilie Sandvej
RM	7	Sanne Troelsgaard Nielsen
CM	4	Maja Kildemoes		(substituted off) 61'
CM	13	Sofie Junge Pedersen		(substituted off) 82'
LM	11	Katrine Veje
CF	10	Pernille Harder (c)
CF	9	Nadia Nadim	(yellow card) 45'
Substitutions:
DF	15	Frederikke Thøgersen		(substituted on) 61'
DF	2	Line Røddik Hansen		(substituted on) 77'
MF	6	Nanna Christiansen		(substituted on) 82'
Manager:
Nils Nielsen

Player of the Match:
Sherida Spitse (Netherlands)

Assistant referees:
Belinda Brem (Switzerland)
Sanja Rodjak Karšić (Croatia)
Fourth official:
Bibiana Steinhaus (Germany)
Fifth official:
Katrin Rafalski (Germany)

Match rules

- 90 minutes.
- 30 minutes of extra time if necessary.
- Penalty shoot-out if scores still level.
- Maximum of three substitutions, with a fourth allowed in extra time.

=== Statistics ===
Statistic	Netherlands	Denmark
Goals scored	4	2
Total shots	10	11
Shots on target	7	4
Saves	1	2
Ball possession	50%	50%
Corner kicks	0	4
Fouls committed	16	10
Offsides	0	2
Yellow cards	3	1
Red cards	0	0
