= Stefanie Enzinger =

Austrian footballer

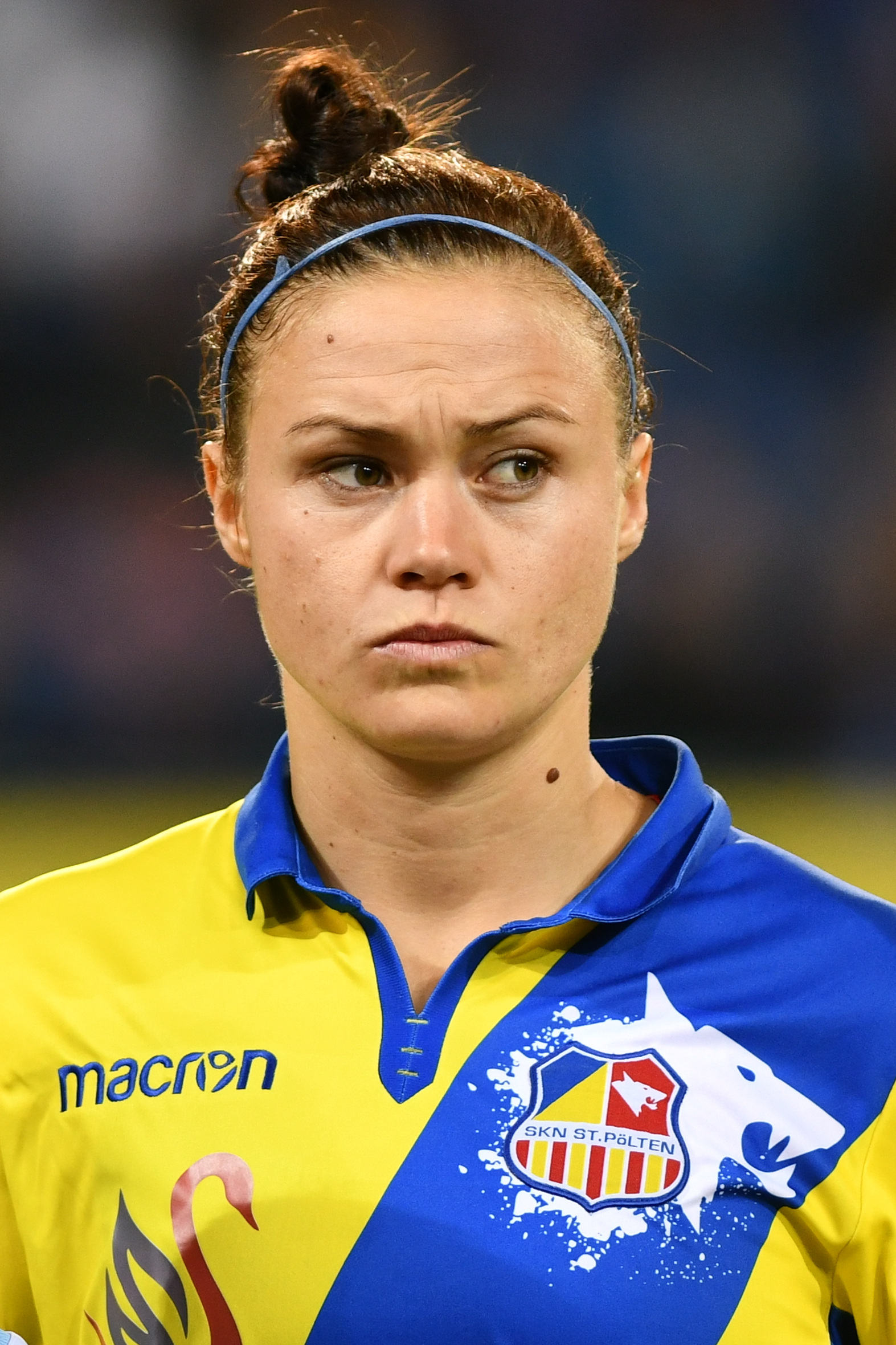
- Enzinger with St. Pölten on 4 October 2017

Personal information
- Date of birth: 25 November 1990 (age 35)
- Place of birth: Mittersill, Austria
- Height: 1.73 m (5 ft 8 in)
- Position: Forward

Team information
- Current team: St. Pölten
- Number: 22

Youth career
- 1998–2006: SC Mittersill

Senior career*
Years	Team	Apps	(Gls)
2006–2010	USK Hof	19	(4)
2010–2015	FC Wacker Innsbruck	56	(28)
2010–2012	→ FC Wacker Innsbruck II	2	(1)
2015–2017	Sturm Graz	45	(40)
2017–	St. Pölten		

International career
2015–	Austria	30	(6)
- * Club domestic league appearances and goals

Stefanie Enzinger (born 25 November 1990) is an Austrian footballer who plays as a forward for St. Pölten in the ÖFB-Frauenliga and for the Austrian women's national team. She has been named as among Austria's best women's footballers of all time.

== Career ==
=== Club ===
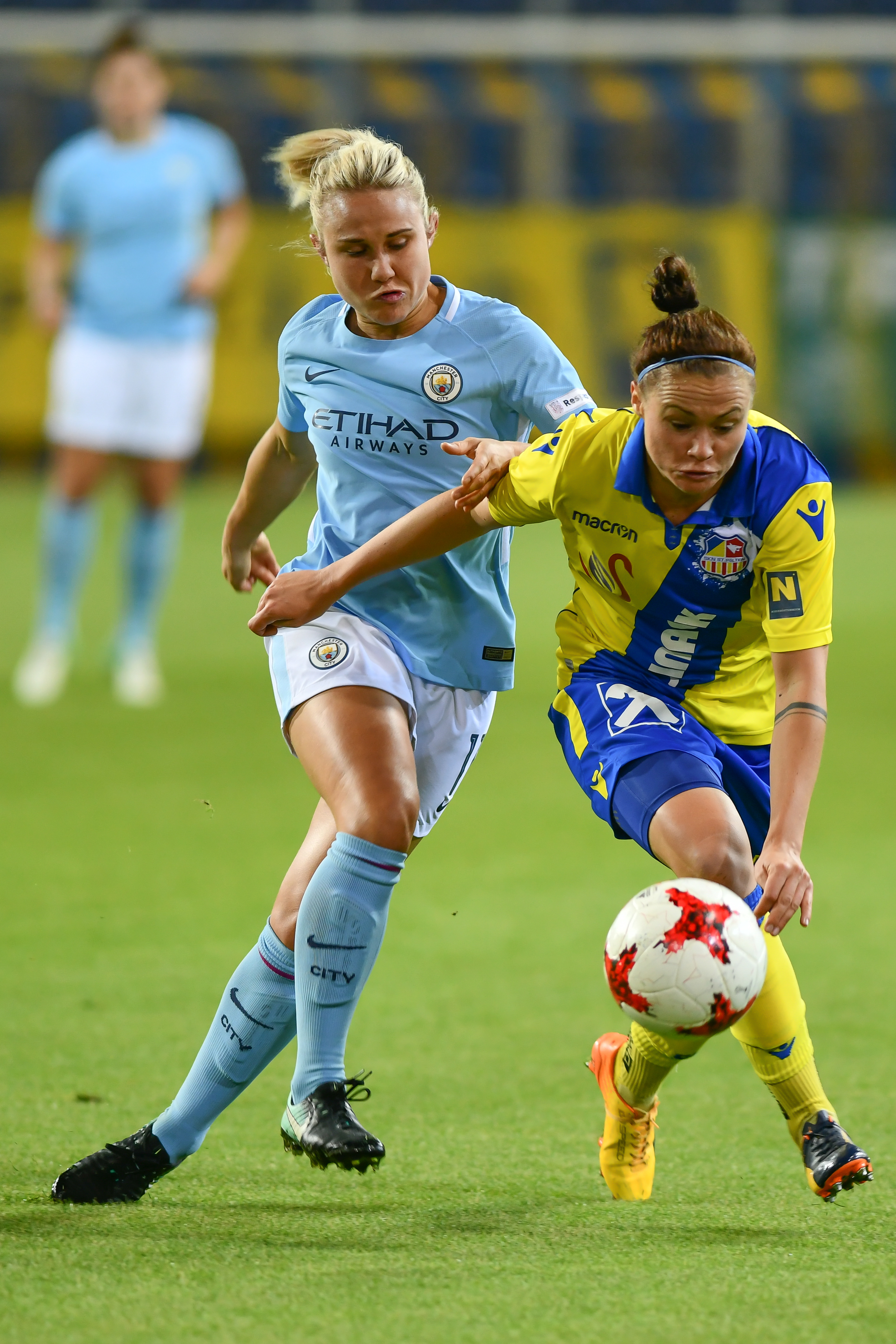
Enzinger (31, SKN), fighting for the ball against Izzy Christiansen (11, MCW) in a game against Manchester City on the first match of the 2017–18 UEFA Women's Champions League's Round of 32, on 4 October 2017

Enzinger began her club career in football shortly before her ninth birthday, when she started to play at her home club, SC Mittersill. There, she played in the boys' teams. In the summer of 2006, Enzinger moved to an all-female team called, USK Hof, where she was coached by Johann Enzinger, who had founded the women's team in June 1999 and acted as club chairman at the time of the founding. With the team, she won the 2006/07 season undefeated in the Austrian second league. In the match for promotion to the ÖFB-Frauenliga, the team lost to the ladies of FC St. Veit. In the following season (2007/08), after the league was expanded to two more teams, the USK Hof again finished in the first place in the final standing, winning 14 of the 16 games they played. Enzinger lost part of the season due to an injury. In the match to the ÖFB-Frauenliga promotion, she joined the team against the ladies of the SV Groß-Schweinbarth. Her team won both matches and were promoted to the Austrian First Division. After the promotion to the ÖFB-Frauenliga, the team struggled, fishing in the penultimate place in the league standing. On 29 March 2009 Enzinger scored her first goal in the league, in a 2 – 3 home defeat against SG Ardagger/Neustadtl.

On 12 January 2010, Enzinger signed with FC Wacker Innsbruck. She debuted on 13 March 2010, in a 2–2 draw against SK Austria Carinthia. Enzinger came in the half-time to replace Arbresha Jahaj. Innsbruck finished the season on the second place. After a good 2011/2012 season with the FC Wacker Innsbruck II when the team finished first in their league, losing only one match in the whole season, Enzinger was permanently promoted to the first team for the 2012/2013 season. She played all 18 season's games, scoring five goals. FC Wacker Innsbruck finished the season in the third place, behind ASV Spratzern (runner-up) and SV Neulengbach (champion).

In the 2013/14 season, Enzinger became a prolific goalscorer, scoring 12 goals in 15 matches. She was the team's top goalscorer and one of ÖFB-Frauenliga top goalscorers. Innsbruck finished 4th place in the league. In the 2013/2014 Austrian women's football Cup, Enzinger scored two goals in three appearances as her team was eliminated early in the competition. In the 2014/15 season, Enzinger continued her good form scoring 14 goals, including a hat-trick on 6 September 2014, in a 6–0 home win over USC Landhaus Wien. She finished the season as the league's third-best goalscorer.

In 2015, after five years with FC Wacker Innsbruck, Enzinger moved to SK Sturm Graz. On 22 March 2015 she made her debut for the Styrians in a 1–1 away match against FSK St. Pölten-Spratzern. Enzinger started the match and was replaced in the 82nd minute by Anna Ebner. SK Sturm Graz finished the season in a third place, their best performance of its existence to that date. The team also reached the Austrian women's football Cup semi-finals, being eliminated by SV Neulengbach. In the 2015/2016 season, Enzinger played all the season's 18 matches. She scored 14 goals, fishing as the league's second-best scorer, tied with Lilla Sipos and only behind Fanny Vágó, who scored 19 goals. On the season's first match against Carinthians Soccer Woman, Enzinger scored a hat-trick in her team's 7–0 home win. In the end of the season, Sturm Graz finished the league in the second place, only behind St. Pölten and thus qualified for the 2016–17 UEFA Women's Champions League, which made that the best season for the team to that date. In 2016/2017 season, Enzinger was involved in the fight to become the league's top scorer. She scored 20 goals in 18 matches, only one goal behind Fanny Vágó, who scored 21 goals. SK Sturm Graz finished the season one more time in the second place, again behind St. Pölten. In the 2016–17 UEFA Women's Champions League, the team was eliminated by FC Zürich in the Round of 32.

Shortly before the end of the season 2016/17, Enzinger announced her transfer to the reigning Austrian champion in women's football, St. Pölten. On 4 October 2017, she made her debut for St. Pölten in the 3–0 defeat against Manchester City on the first match of the 2017–18 UEFA Women's Champions League's Round of 32.

Enzinger's last season on St. Pölten's squad was 2022–23, and as of January 2024 her Instagram now lists her as a "Former Pro Footballer".

=== International ===
Enzinger was called up for the first time for the Austrian national team on 7 April 2015 for a friendly match against Australia. However, she went unused in this match. Enzinger made her debut for the ÖFB ladies on 17 September 2015 when she made a brief appearance in the Group 8's first match of qualifying for the UEFA Women's Euro 2017. In the game against Kazakhstan, a 2–0 win, she came in the match's 92nd minute replacing Nicole Billa. In 2017, Enzinger was part of the squad who represented Austria at the 2017 Cyprus Women's Cup. On 1 July 2017, Enzinger was included by Dominik Thalhammer in the 23-women squad that represented Austria in UEFA Women's Euro 2017. On 26 July 2017, in the Group C's last match against Iceland, Enzinger came in the game's 86th minute, replacing Nicole Billa. In the 89th, she managed to score her first international goal. Austria did very well in the Euro, reaching the semi-finals.

She was named to Austria's squad for UEFA Women's Euro 2022, although she did not appear in any matches.

== International goals ==
No.	Date	Venue	Opponent	Score	Result	Competition
1.	26 July 2017	Sparta Stadion Het Kasteel, Rotterdam, Netherlands	Iceland	3–0	3–0	UEFA Women's Euro 2017
2.	22 October 2021	Stadion Wiener Neustadt, Wiener Neustadt, Austria	Luxembourg	4–0	5–0	2023 FIFA Women's World Cup qualification
3.	26 October 2021	Seaview, Belfast, Northern Ireland	Northern Ireland	2–2	2–2	2023 FIFA Women's World Cup qualification
4.	30 November 2021	Stade de Luxembourg, Luxembourg City, Luxembourg	Luxembourg	1–0	8–0	2023 FIFA Women's World Cup qualification
5.	30 November 2021	Stade de Luxembourg, Luxembourg City, Luxembourg	Luxembourg	2–0	8–0	2023 FIFA Women's World Cup qualification
6.	30 November 2021	Stade de Luxembourg, Luxembourg City, Luxembourg	Luxembourg	3–0	8–0	2023 FIFA Women's World Cup qualification
