= Viktoria Schnaderbeck =

Austrian footballer

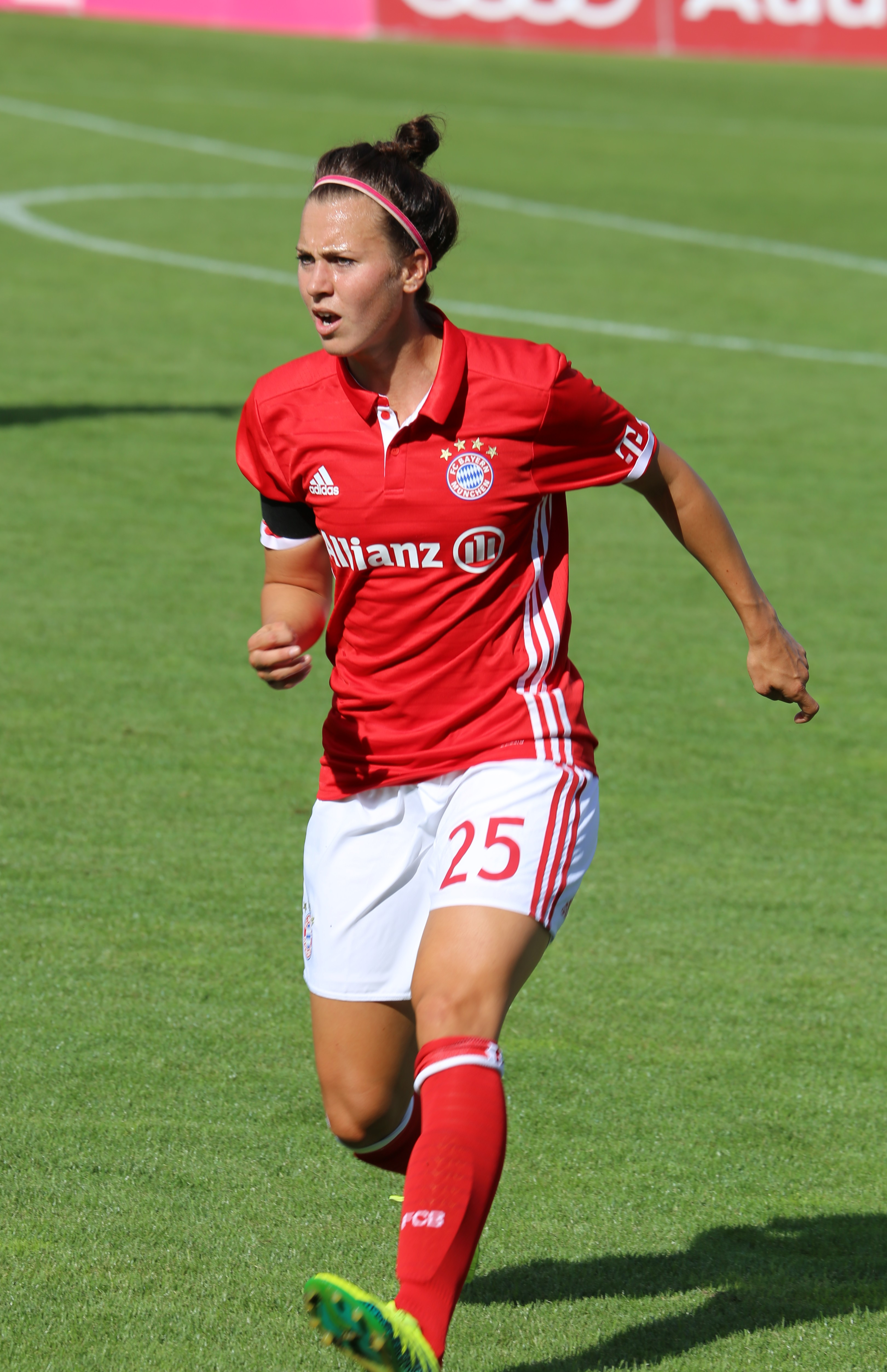
- Schnaderbeck with Bayern Munich in 2016

Personal information
- Date of birth: 4 January 1991 (age 35)
- Place of birth: Graz, Austria
- Height: 1.74 m (5 ft 9 in)
- Positions: Midfielder; centre-back

Youth career
- 1998–2006: TSV Kirchberg an der Raab
- 2003–2005: LAZ Weiz

Senior career*
Years	Team	Apps	(Gls)
2005–2007	LUV Graz		
2007–2018	Bayern Munich	132	(5)
2018–2022	Arsenal	40	(0)
2022	→ Tottenham Hotspur (loan)	4	(0)

International career^{‡}
2007–2022	Austria	83	(2)
- * Club domestic league appearances and goals as of 27 January 2022 ‡ National team caps and goals as of 22:40, 13 July 2022 (UTC)

Viktoria Schnaderbeck (born 4 January 1991) is an Austrian former professional footballer who last played for Arsenal in the FA WSL. She was the captain of the Austrian national team. She previously played for FC Bayern Munich in Germany's Frauen-Bundesliga, LUV Graz in Austria's ÖFB-Frauenliga, and most recently for Tottenham Hotspur on loan from Arsenal in the FA WSL.

== Club career ==
Schnaderbeck was with FC Bayern Munich since 2010, winning the league in the 2014–15 and 2015–16 seasons. She made 5 appearances in the UEFA Women's Champions League in 2015–16 and 2016–17 seasons. On 18 April 2016, Schnaderbeck extended her contract until 2018. After her contract with the German side ran out, she signed for Arsenal in May 2018. In January 2022, it was announced that Schnaderbeck had joined Tottenham Hotspur on loan for the rest of the 2021–22 season.

On 10 August 2022 in a joint press conference with Lisa Makas, Schanderbeck announced her retirement from professional football.

== International career ==
Schnaderbeck was part of the 23-women squad who represented Austria and reached the semi-finals at the UEFA Women's Euro 2017.

Schnaderbeck was part of the squad that was called up to the UEFA Women's Euro 2022.

== Personal life ==
Her cousin Sebastian Prödl is a former footballer who played as a centre-back. She has a girlfriend from Norway that moved to London.

== Honours ==
=== Club ===
Bayern München

- Bundesliga: 2014–15, 2015–16
- DFB-Pokal: 2012
- Bundesliga Cup: 2011

Arsenal

- FA WSL: 2018–19

=== International ===
Austria

- Cyprus Cup: 2016
