= Virginia Kirchberger =

Austrian footballer (born 1993)

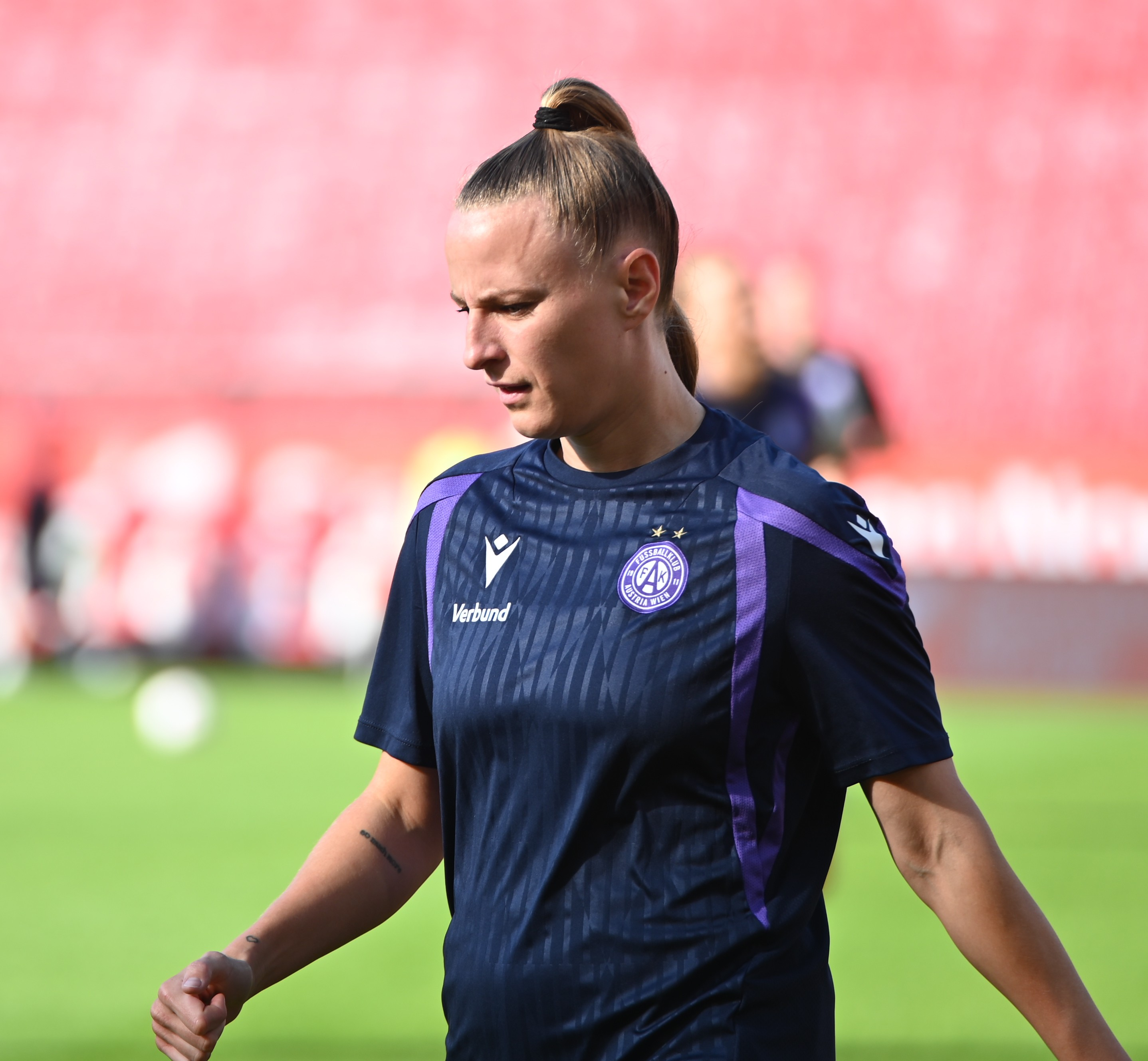
- Virginia Kirchberger in 2026

Personal information
- Full name: Virginia Kirchberger
- Date of birth: 25 May 1993 (age 33)
- Place of birth: Vienna, Austria
- Height: 1.76 m (5 ft 9 in)
- Position: Defender

Team information
- Current team: FK Austria Wien
- Number: 13

Senior career*
Years	Team	Apps	(Gls)
2009–2011	Bayern Munich		
2011–2014	BV Cloppenburg	57	(7)
2014–2015	MSV Duisburg	22	(1)
2015–2016	1. FC Köln	18	(2)
2016–2018	MSV Duisburg	43	(2)
2018–2020	SC Freiburg	34	(1)
2020–2024	Eintracht Frankfurt	41	(0)
2024–	FK Austria Wien	21	(3)

International career^{‡}
2010–	Austria	126	(6)
- * Club domestic league appearances and goals as of 20 May 2025 ‡ National team caps and goals as of 14 October 2026

Virginia Kirchberger (born 25 May 1993) is an Austrian footballer who plays for FK Austria Wien and the Austria national team.

In the summer of 2020, Kirchberger made the move to Eintracht Frankfurt in the Frauen Bundesliga ahead of the 2020/21 campaign, after they merged with 1.FFC Frankfurt.

== International career ==
Kirchberger was part of the 23-women squad who represented Austria and reached the semi-finals at the UEFA Women's Euro 2017.

Kirchberger was not initially part of the squad that was called up to the UEFA Women's Euro 2022, but was called up after Lisa Kolb caught covid.

== International goals ==
No.	Date	Venue	Opponent	Score	Result	Competition
1.	6 June 2016	Waldviertler Volksbank Arena, Horn, Austria	Israel	4–0	4–0	UEFA Women's Euro 2017 qualifying
2.	19 February 2021	Tony Bezzina Stadium, Paola, Malta	Sweden	1–1	1–1	Friendly
3.	15 November 2022	Stadion Wiener Neustadt, Wiener Neustadt, Austria	Slovakia	2–0	3–0	Friendly
4.	23 February 2024	Estadio Nuevo Mirador, Algeciras, Spain	England	1–2	2–7	Friendly
5.	23 February 2024	Estadio Nuevo Mirador, Algeciras, Spain	England	2–5	2–7	Friendly
6.	13 October 2026	Sportclub-Platz Dornbach, Vienna, Austria	Kosovo	3–0	4–0	2027 FIFA Women's World Cup qualification

== Personal life ==
Kirchberger is married to footballer Nadine Prohaska on June 11, 2026.

== See also ==
- List of women's footballers with 100 or more international caps
