= Maja Kildemoes =

Danish footballer (born 1996)

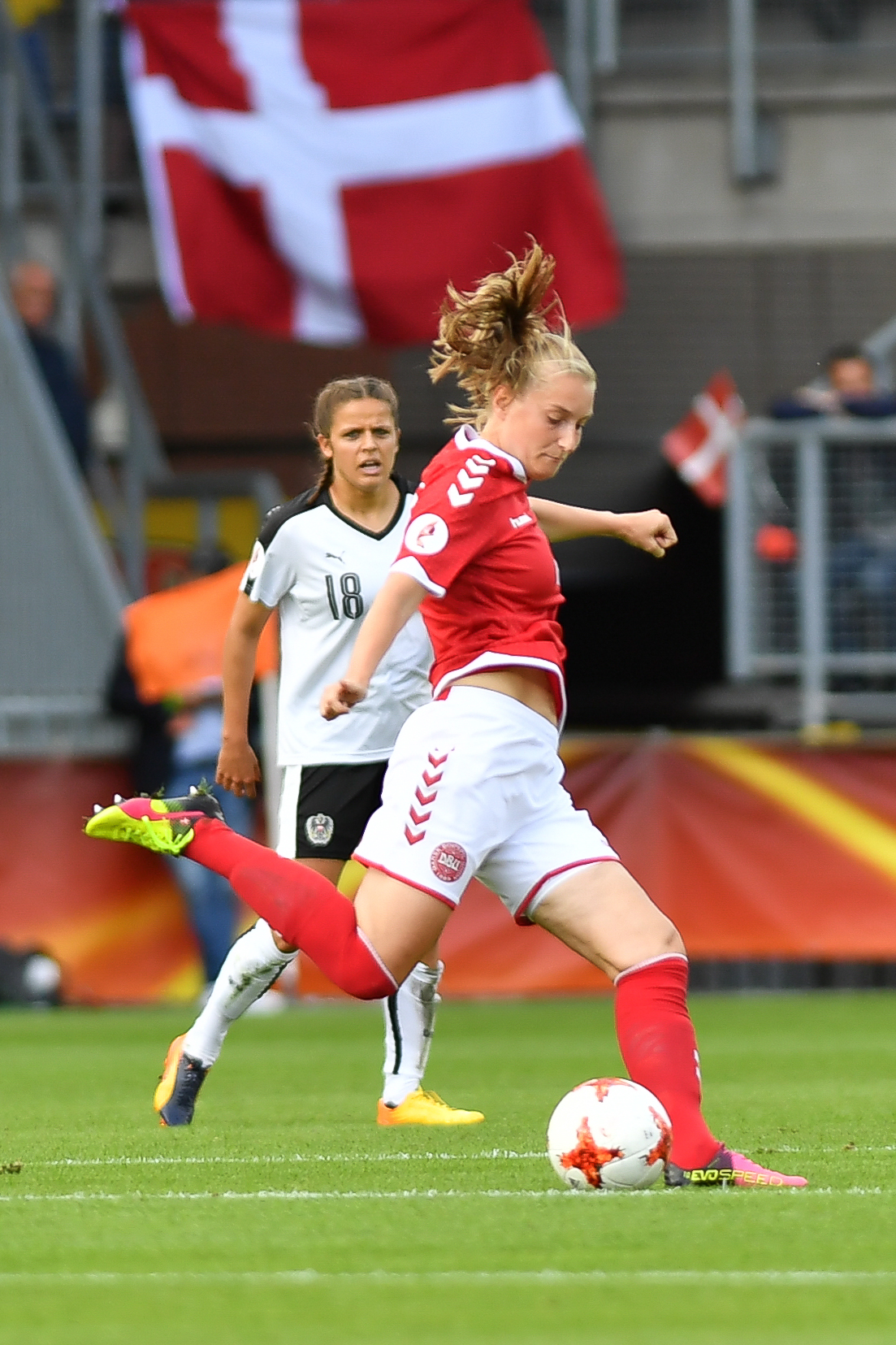

Personal information
- Full name: Maja Ring Kildemoes
- Date of birth: 15 August 1996 (age 30)
- Place of birth: Næsby, Denmark
- Height: 1.76 m (5 ft 9 in)
- Position: Defender

Team information
- Current team: Brøndby IF
- Number: 4

Youth career
- Næsby BK

Senior career*
Years	Team	Apps	(Gls)
2013–2016	Odense		
2017–2018	Linkopings	39	(5)
2020–	Brøndby IF	9	(0)

International career^{‡}
2015–	Denmark	27	(1)
Medal record
Women's football
Representing Denmark
UEFA Women's Championship
Silver medal – second place	2017 Netherlands	Team
- * Club domestic league appearances and goals as of 14:30, 29 December 2016 (UTC) ‡ National team caps and goals as of 21:38, 4 May 2017 (UTC)

Maja Ring Kildemoes (born 15 August 1996) is a Danish football defender who plays for Danish club Brøndby IF and the Denmark women's national football team. She previously played for Elitedivisionen club Odense and Linköpings FC in Damallsvenskan.

== Club career ==
Kildemoes played for Næsby BK's youth teams alongside boys until under-15 level, then joined Odense of the Elitedivisionen. In November 2016 she signed a two-year contract with Swedish Damallsvenskan champions Linköpings FC.

== International career ==
Kildemoes made her debut for the senior Denmark women's national football team in September 2015, a 2–0 win over Romania in Mogoșoaia. She entered play as a substitute for Janni Arnth Jensen on 69 minutes and scored Denmark's first goal two minutes later.

=== International goals ===
Scores and results list Denmark's goal tally first.

#	Date	Venue	Opponent	Score	Result	Competition
1.	17 September 2015	Mogoșoaia, Romania	Romania	1–0	2–0	Friendly

== Honour ==
=== Club ===
Winner

- Damallsvenskan: 2017
