= Nadine Prohaska =

Austrian footballer

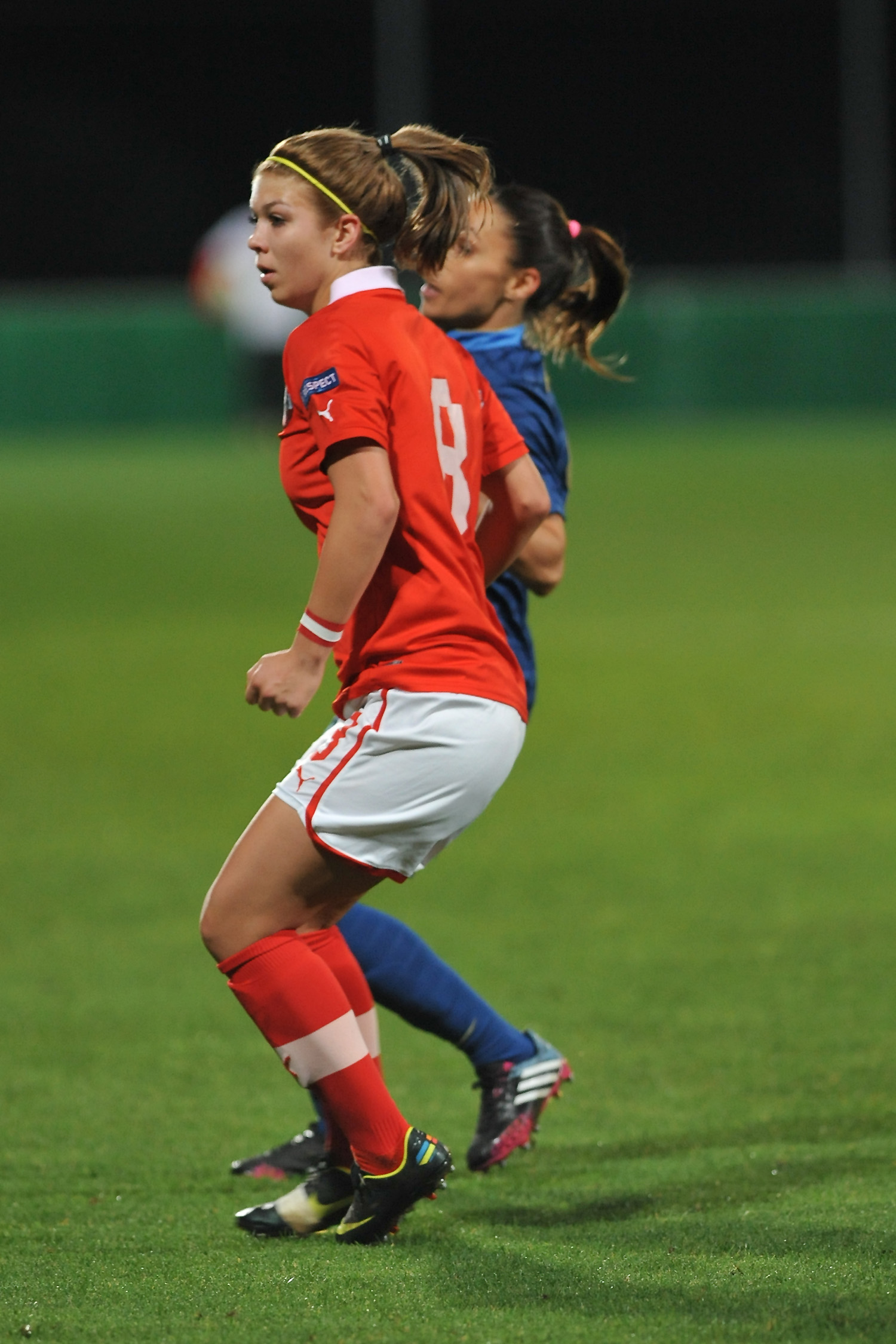
- Nadine Prohaska 2013

Personal information
- Full name: Nadine Prohaska
- Date of birth: 15 August 1990 (age 36)
- Place of birth: Vienna, Austria
- Height: 1.64 m (5 ft 5 in)
- Position: Midfielder

Team information
- Current team: SC Sand
- Number: 8

Senior career*
Years	Team	Apps	(Gls)
2005–2007	Landhaus		
2007–2009	Neulengbach		(5)
2009–2011	Bayern Munich	3	(0)
2012–2018	St. Pölten		
2018–2020	SC Sand	39	(3)

International career^{‡}
2009–	Austria	92	(7)
- * Club domestic league appearances and goals ‡ National team caps and goals as of 8 October 2019

Nadine Prohaska (born 15 August 1990) is an Austrian football midfielder, currently playing for SC Sand in the Frauen Bundesliga. She previously played for USC Landhaus and SV Neulengbach, and Bayern Munich in the German Bundesliga.

She is a member of the Austrian national team.

== Titles ==
- 2 Austrian Leagues (2008, 2009)
- 2 Austrian Cups (2008, 2009)
- 1 German Bundesliga Cup (2011)

== Personal life ==
Prohaska is married to footballer Virginia Kirchberger on June 11, 2026.
