= Dominik Thalhammer =

Austrian football manager

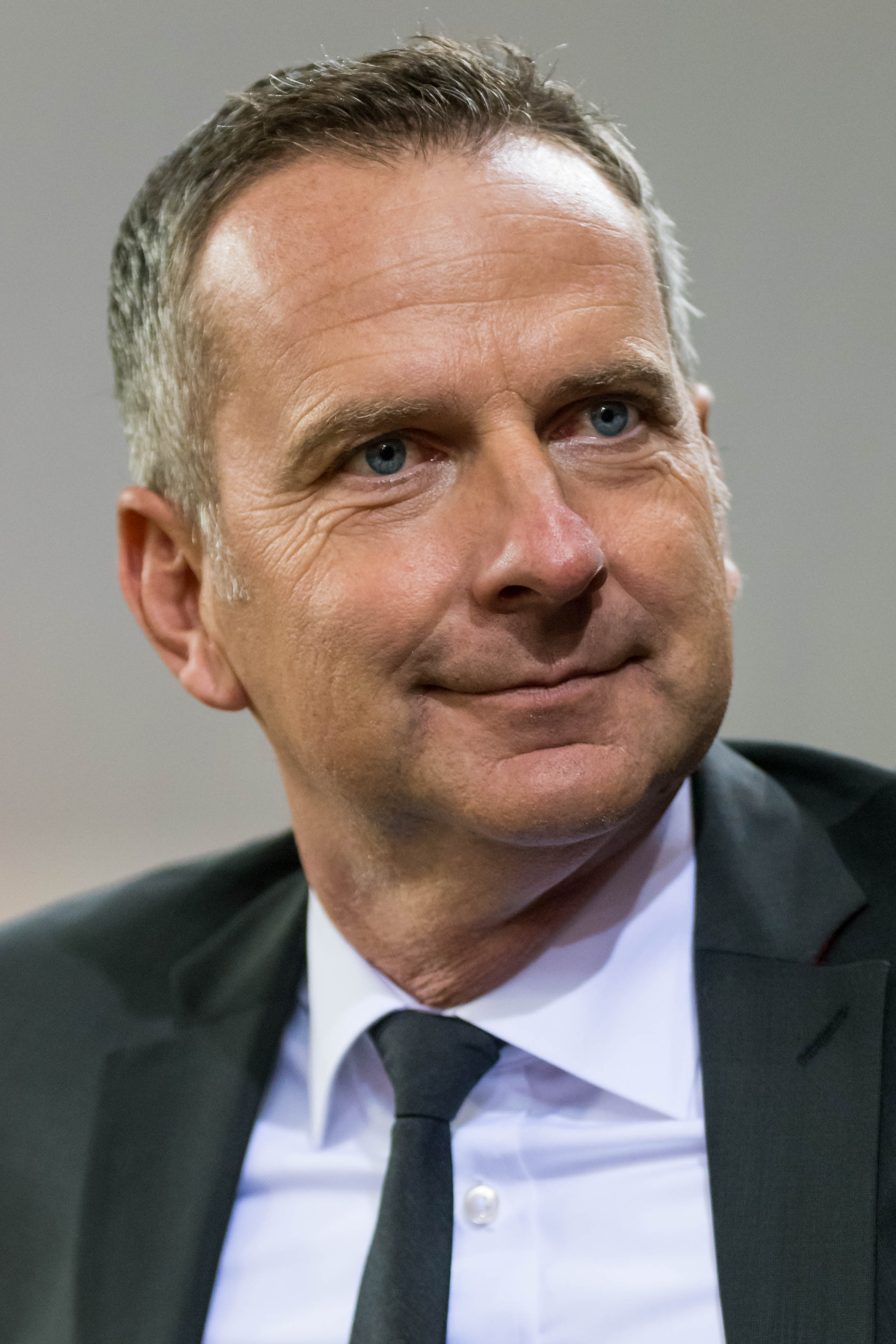
- Thalhammer in October 2017

Personal information
- Date of birth: 2 October 1970 (age 56)
- Place of birth: Vienna, Austria
- Height: 1.86 m (6 ft 1 in)

Managerial career
- Years: Team
- 1997–2000: SC Brunn/Gebirge
- 2000–2003: AKA Admira Wacker Mödling U18
- 2003–2004: FC Admira Wacker Mödling II
- 2004–2005: FC Admira Wacker Mödling
- 2006: Wiener Sportklub
- 2008: Floridsdorfer AC
- 2010: TSV Ottensheim
- 2010–2011: Union Pregarten
- 2011–2020: Austria women
- 2020–2021: LASK Linz
- 2021–2022: Cercle Brugge
- 2022–2023: KV Oostende

Dominik Thalhammer (born 2 October 1970) is an Austrian football manager, best known for bringing Austria's women to the brink of the Euros final at their first ever major championship, and later spells at Cercle Brugge and KV Oostende in Belgian men's football.

== Coaching career ==
=== Early career ===
Thalhammer first made his name at FC Admira Wacker Mödling, being appointed as U18 coach at the age of 29. Impressing as both U18 and reserve team coach, Thalhammer was put in charge of the first team in 2004, making the then 33-year-old the youngest coach in the history of the Austrian Bundesliga.

Leaving the role after eleven months with Admira losing their first six games of the 2005-06 season, and having moved through a series of Austrian men's clubs through the 2000s, Thalhammer made a switch to women's football in 2011.

=== Austria women's team coach ===
Thalhammer was appointed coach of both the Austria women's national team and the Austrian U17 women in 2011. In his first campaign in charge, Austria reached the Euro play-offs for the first time in their history, losing to Russia in their bid to reach Euro 2013 in Sweden.

With the U17s, Thalhammer achieved the first qualification of an Austrian women's national team for the finals of any European Championship, which took place in England in 2014. There they narrowly missed out on a place in the semi-finals after a 0-0 draw against Portugal, a 2-1 defeat against England and a 1-0 win over Italy.

After finishing second in their qualifying group for the 2015 FIFA Women's World Cup behind France, with only the group winners going through to the finals, Austria qualified for a major tournament for the first time, Euro 2017 held in the Netherlands.

Beating Switzerland and Iceland in the group stage, added to a draw against France, Austria qualified for the knockout stages on their debut, with a shock victory achieved in the quarter-finals over Spain on penalties after a goalless draw.

Another shoot-out in the semis against Denmark saw them edged out in another shoot-out, where Austria failed to score. The sensational run saw Thalhammer nominated as FIFA Women's World Coach of the Year, where he finished eighth.

Austria would go on to miss out on qualification for the 2019 FIFA World Cup, despite losing only two of their eight qualifying games, both of those to eventual group-winners Spain, with the only automatic spot available from the group taken by the future 2023 World Cup winners, who won all eight qualifying group games.

=== LASK Linz ===
After nine years as Austria women's coach, Thalhammer stepped down to return to the men's game for the 2020-2021 season with LASK Linz, guiding the Upper Austrians to fourth-place, qualifying for the UEFA Europa League, and reaching the 2021 Cup Final, where they lost to Red Bull Salzburg.

LASK got off to a bad start in the 2021-22 season, falling to second-last by the seventh matchday, dropping out of the Europa League into the Conference League. Thalhammer was dismissed from LASK in September 2021.

=== Cercle Brugge and KV Oostende ===
Within two months, Thalhammer was approached by lowly Belgian Pro League team Cercle Brugge, who were second-from-bottom and fighting relegation. The Austrian won seven of his first eight games in charge at Cercle, finishing the 2021-22 Pro League season 10th of the 18 clubs, missing out on the European play-offs by two places. A poor start to the following campaign saw him replaced in September 2022 by his assistant Miron Muslic.

Thalhammer quickly moved to nearby KV Oostende, but with the club suffering from a severe lack of funding, they were relegated at the end of the 2022–23 Belgian Pro League season, and Thalhammer stood down as coach.
