= Katharina Schiechtl =

Austrian footballer (born 1993)

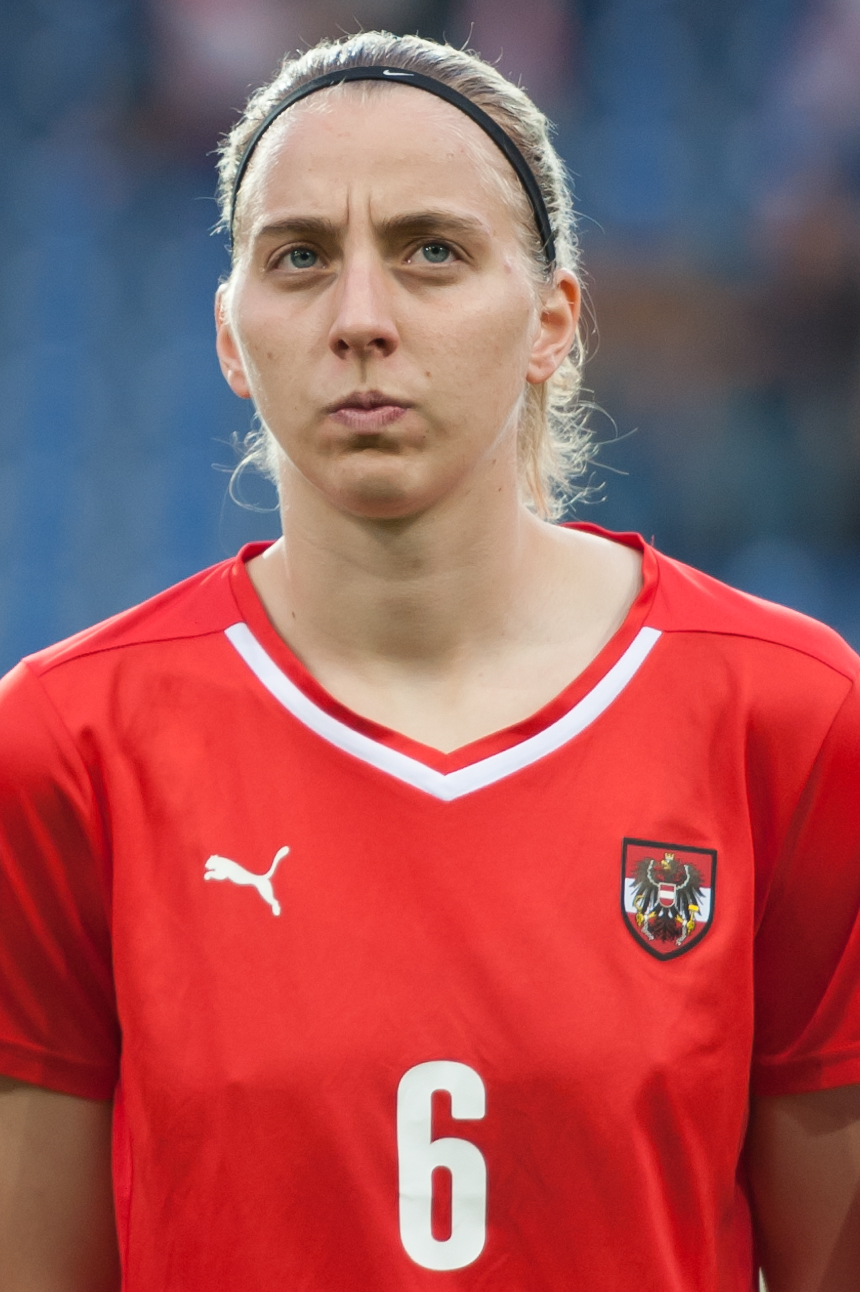
- Schiechtl in 2015

Personal information
- Date of birth: 27 February 1993 (age 33)
- Place of birth: Zams, Austria
- Height: 1.85 m (6 ft 1 in)
- Position: Right-back

Team information
- Current team: Austria Wien
- Number: 8

Youth career
- 2001–2007: SV Karres

Senior career*
Years	Team	Apps	(Gls)
2007–2013	Wacker Innsbruck		
2013–2023	Werder Bremen	180	(27)
2023–	Austria Wien	68	(13)

International career^{‡}
2010–2012	Austria U19	8	(0)
2014–	Austria	77	(10)
- * Club domestic league appearances and goals as of 21 November 2026 ‡ National team caps and goals as of 17 April 2026

Katharina Schiechtl (born 27 February 1993) is an Austrian footballer who plays as a right-back for Austria Wien.

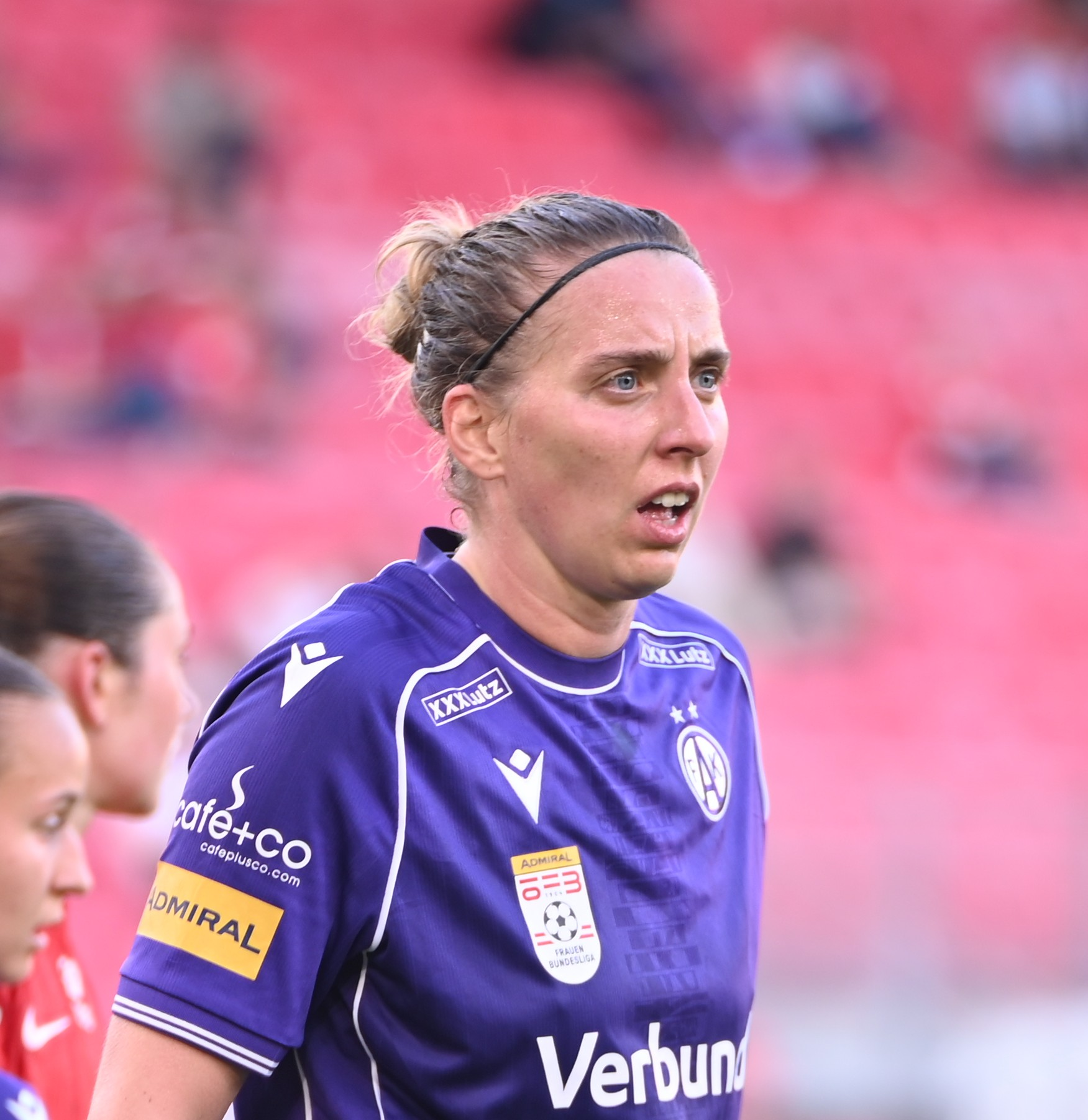
Schiechtl in 2026

== International career ==
Schiechtl was part of the 23-woman squad that represented Austria and reached the semi-finals at the UEFA Women's Euro 2017.

Schiechtl was part of the squad that was called up to the UEFA Women's Euro 2022.

== Career statistics ==
Scores and results list Austria's goal tally first, score column indicates score after each Schiechtl goal.

List of international goals scored by Katharina Schiechtl
No.	Date	Venue	Opponent	Score	Result	Competition
1	7 April 2015	Stadion Villach Lind, Villach, Austria	Australia	1–0	2–1	Friendly
2	22 September 2015	NV Arena, Sankt Pölten, Austria	Wales	1–0	3–0	UEFA Women's Euro 2017 qualifying
3	9 March 2016	Vorwärts Stadium, Steyr, Austria	Poland	2–1	2–1	2016 Cyprus Women's Cup
4	6 April 2016	Vorwärts Stadium, Steyr, Austria	Kazakhstan	1–0	6–1	UEFA Women's Euro 2017 qualifying
5	8 June 2018	Telia 5G -areena, Helsinki, Finland	Finland	2–0	2–0	UEFA Women's Euro 2017 qualifying
6	12 June 2018	Ramat Gan Stadium, Ramat Gan, Israel	Israel	1–0	6–0	UEFA Women's Euro 2017 qualifying
7	12 April 2022	Stadion Wiener Neustadt, Wiener Neustadt, Austria	Latvia	4–0	8–0	2023 FIFA Women's World Cup qualification
8	22 June 2022	motion invest Arena, Maria Enzersdorf, Austria	Montenegro	1–0	4–0	Friendly
9	11 July 2022	St Mary's Stadium, Southampton, England	Northern Ireland	1–0	2–0	UEFA Women's Euro 2022
10	5 December 2023	NV Arena, Sankt Pölten, Austria	Norway	2–0	2–1	2023–24 UEFA Women's Nations League

== Honours ==
- ÖFB Frauen-Bundesliga 2025–26
- ÖFB Frauen Cup 2025–26
