= Lisa Makas =

Austrian football striker

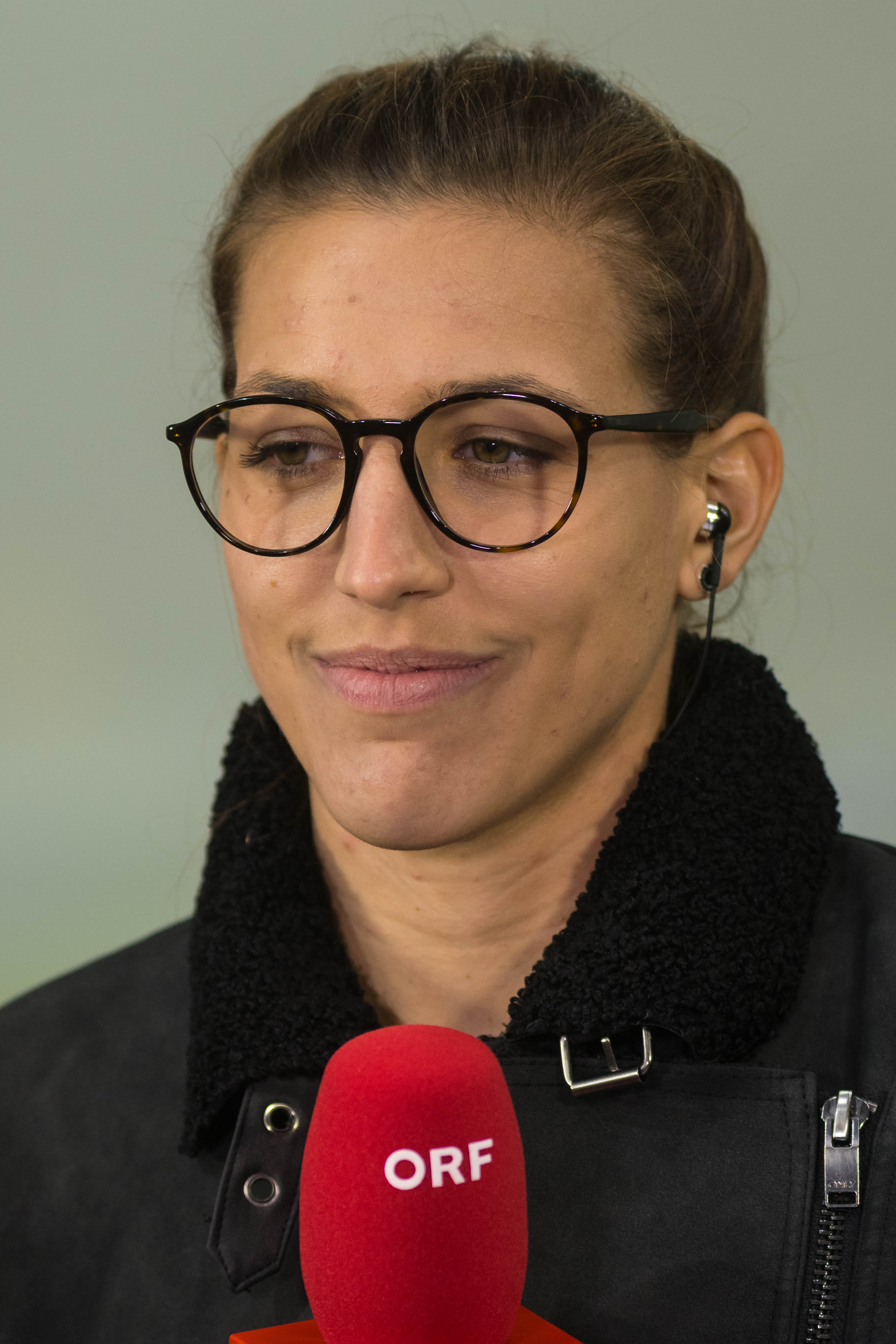

Personal information
- Date of birth: 11 May 1992 (age 34)
- Place of birth: Mödling, Austria
- Height: 1.73 m (5 ft 8 in)
- Position: Striker

Senior career*
Years	Team	Apps	(Gls)
2006–2011	SKV Altenmarkt		
2011–2015	SKN St. Pölten	39	(41)
2015–2016	SC Freiburg		
2016–2020	MSV Duisburg	41	(7)
2020–2022	SKN St. Pölten	0	(0)

International career^{‡}
2010–2011	Austria U-19s	6	(10)
2010–2022	Austria	74	(19)
- * Club domestic league appearances and goals as of 1 March 2020 (UTC) ‡ National team caps and goals as of 21:25, 31 July 2022 (UTC)

Lisa Makas (born 11 May 1992) is an Austrian retired football striker, She last played for SKN St. Pölten in the Austrian ÖFB-Frauenliga.

On 10 August 2022, Makas in a joint press conference with fellow Austrian Viktoria Schnaderbeck announced her retirement from football.

== International career ==
Makas was part of the 23-women squad who represented Austria and reached the semi-finals at the UEFA Women's Euro 2017.

Makas was part of the squad that was called up to the UEFA Women's Euro 2022.

== Honours ==
St. Pölten-Spratzern

- ÖFB-Frauenliga: Winner 2014–15
- ÖFB Ladies Cup: Winner 2013–14, 2013–14, 2014–15
