= Verena Hanshaw =

Austrian footballer (born 1994)

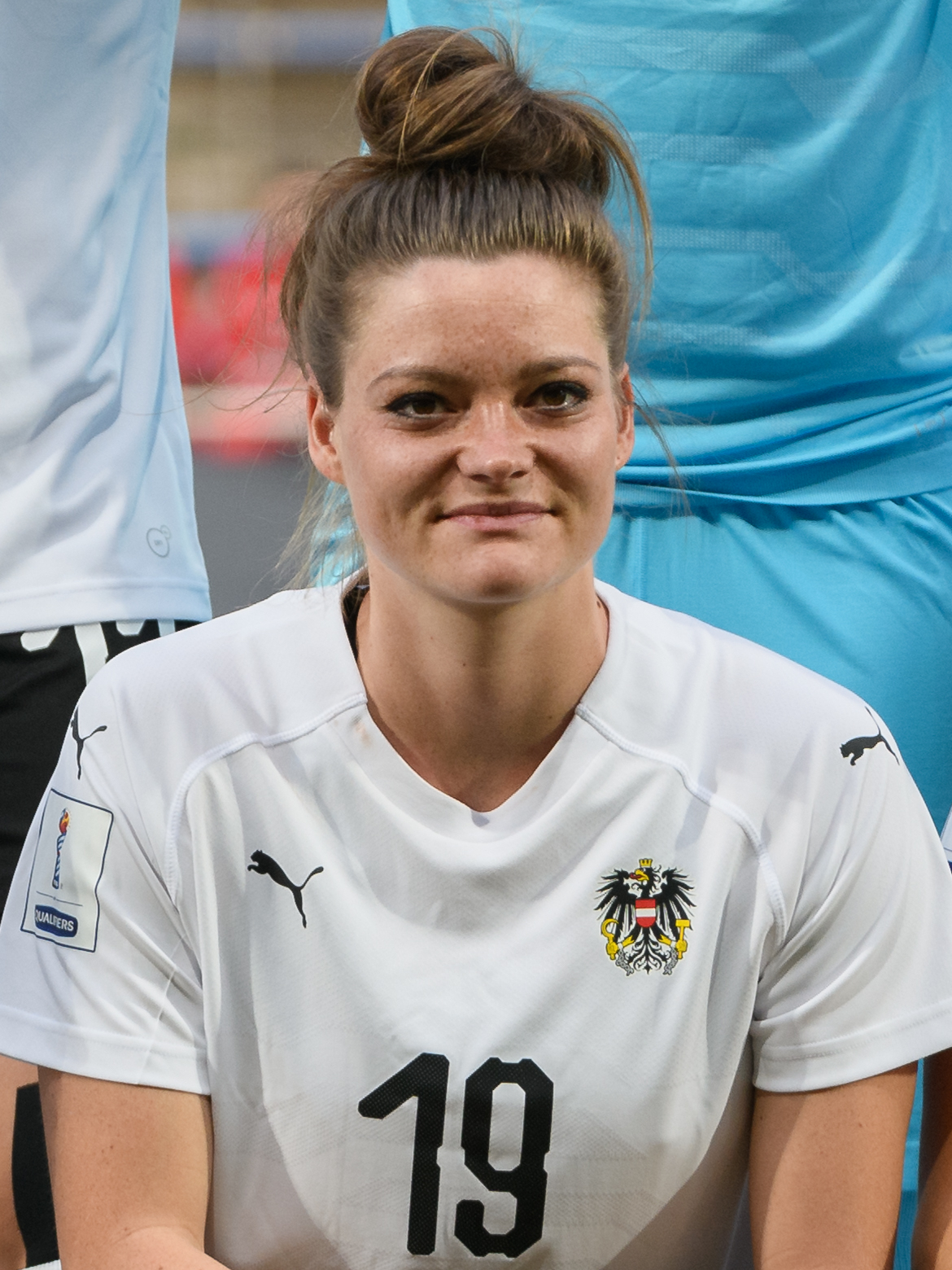
- Verena Hanshaw in 2018

Personal information
- Birth name: Verena Aschauer
- Date of birth: 20 January 1994 (age 32)
- Place of birth: Vienna, Austria
- Height: 1.70 m (5 ft 7 in)
- Position: Defender

Team information
- Current team: FK Austria
- Number: 18

Senior career*
Years	Team	Apps	(Gls)
2009–2010	Landhaus Wien	15	(1)
2010–2011	Herfoder SV	19	(1)
2011–2014	Cloppenburg	60	(10)
2014–2016	SC Freiburg	26	(0)
2016–2018	SC Sand	35	(6)
2018–2024	Eintracht Frankfurt	114	(4)
2024–2025	AS Roma	10	(0)
2025–2026	West Ham United	21	(1)
2026-	FK Austria	9	(1)

International career^{‡}
2010	Austria U17	7	(0)
2011–2012	Austria U19	3	(1)
2012–	Austria	132	(10)
- * Club domestic league appearances and goals as of 21 November 2026 ‡ National team caps and goals as of 10 October 2026

Verena Hanshaw (née Aschauer, Austrian German: [veˈreːna ˈaʃaʊɐ]; born 20 January 1994) is an Austrian professional footballer who plays as a defender for ÖFB Frauen Bundesliga club FK Austria and the Austria national team. With over 100 appearances for her country, she is one of the most capped players in Austria's history.

She previously played for USC Landhaus Wien in the Austrian Frauenliga, Herforder SV and BV Cloppenburg, before spells at SC Freiburg, SC Sandand a six-year stint with Eintracht Frankfurt. She was an Under-19 international.

== Club career ==
Verena started her senior club career in 2009 with Austrian club USC Landhaus Wien, for whom she made 15 appearances and scored one goal. In 2010, she moved to German side Herfoder SV for one season, where she played 19 matches in the Frauen-Bundesliga.

In July 2011, Hanshaw signed for second division club Cloppenburg. She made her debut a month later against FSV Gütersloh. In the 2012-13 campaign, Verena started 21 of the team's 22 league matches as they won the 2. Frauen-Bundesliga title and earned promotion to the Frauen-Bundesliga. In all competitions, she scored 11 goals in 24 appearances that season.

Following Cloppenburg's relegation in 2013–14, Hanshaw joined Bundesliga side SC Freiburg in July 2014. She made 31 appearances across her two seasons at the club.

Verena moved to SC Sand in 2016. The team reached the DFB-Pokal Frauen final in 2016, but narrowly lost 2–1 to reigning cup holders Wolfsburg.

In July 2018, Hanshaw joined Eintracht Frankfurt (then 1. FFC Frankfurt). The defender established herself as a regular in their starting XI and played in at least 20 league matches in five of her six years at the club. On 10 December 2021, Frankfurt announced that Hanshaw had signed a two-year contract extension to remain at the club until 2024.

Hanshaw helped Frankfurt to third-place finishes in the Bundesliga for three years in a row from 2021-22 to 2023-24. Frankfurt qualified for the 2023-24 UEFA Women's Champions League group stage, with Hanshaw playing ten times in the competition (including qualifying rounds). On 7 May 2024, it was confirmed that Hanshaw would leave Eintracht Frankfurt upon the expiry of her contract in the summer. During her six years at the club, she made over 130 appearances.

The next day, Serie A champions Roma announced the signing of Hanshaw on a two-year deal. She made her Serie A debut in the Derby della Capitale against Lazio on 30 August and provided an assist in a 2–2 draw. On 6 January 2025, Hanshaw played the full match as Roma beat Fiorentina 3–1 to win the 2024 Supercoppa Italiana trophy.

On 21 January, after just a few months at Roma, Hanshaw signed for Women's Super League club West Ham United. She made her debut in a 2–0 win over Everton on 26 January.

On 3 July 2026, it was announced that Hanshaw had signed with ÖFB Frauen Bundesliga club FK Austria.

== International career ==
Hanshaw played for Austria's under-17 and under-19 teams before making her senior international debut in 2011, at the age of 17. She has won over 100 caps for her country.

Hanshaw was part of the 23-women squad who represented Austria and reached the semi-finals at the UEFA Women's Euro 2017. Her strong performances resulted in her being the only Austrian included in the "Eleven of the Tournament", voted for by the UEFA coaching staff.

Verena was part of the squad that was called up to the UEFA Women's Euro 2022 and started all four of Austria's matches at the tournament.

As of October 2024, Hanshaw is the Austria women's national team's fifth most capped player and joint-eighth highest goalscorer of all time.

== Personal life ==
Verena was initially known in her football career by her maiden name Aschauer, but she changed to Hanshaw after getting married in July 2021.

== Career statistics ==
=== International ===
As of match played 21 February 2025

Appearances and goals by national team and year
National team	Year	Apps	Goals
Austria	2011	2	0
Austria	2012	4	1
Austria	2013	7	0
Austria	2014	8	1
Austria	2015	5	0
Austria	2016	10	1
Austria	2017	15	2
Austria	2018	7	1
Austria	2019	8	0
Austria	2020	6	1
Austria	2021	7	2
Austria	2022	14	0
Austria	2023	10	0
Austria	2024	12	0
Austria	2025	1	0
Total		116	9

Scores and results list Austria's goal tally first, score column indicates score after each Hanshaw goal.

List of international goals scored by Verena Hanshaw
No.	Date	Venue	Opponent	Score	Result	Competition
1	15 September 2012	NV Arena, Sankt Pölten, Austria	Denmark	1–0	3–1	UEFA Women's Euro 2013 qualifying
2	5 April 2014	Gradski stadion, Lovech, Bulgaria	Bulgaria	5–0	6–1	2015 FIFA Women's World Cup qualification
3	6 April 2016	Vorwärts Stadium, Steyr, Austria	Kazakhstan	3–0	6–1	UEFA Women's Euro 2017 qualifying
4	3 March 2017	GSP Stadium, Strovolos, Cyprus	New Zealand	2–0	3–0	2017 Cyprus Women's Cup
5	8 March 2017	GSZ Stadium, Strovolos, Cyprus	Belgium	1–1	1–1	2017 Cyprus Women's Cup
6	12 June 2018	Ramat Gan Stadium, Ramat Gan, Israel	Israel	5–0	6–0	2019 FIFA Women's World Cup qualification
7	22 September 2020	Namyz Stadium, Shymkent, Kazakhstan	Kazakhstan	3–0	5–0	UEFA Women's Euro 2022 qualifying
8	21 September 2021	Toše Proeski Arena, Skopje, North Macedonia	North Macedonia	3–0	6–0	2023 FIFA Women's World Cup qualification
9	21 September 2021	Toše Proeski Arena, Skopje, North Macedonia	North Macedonia	4–0	6–0	2023 FIFA Women's World Cup qualification

== Honours ==
BV Cloppenburg

- 2. Frauen-Bundesliga: 2012–13

AS Roma

- Supercoppa Italiana: 2024–25

Austria

- Cyprus Women's Cup: 2016

== See also ==
- List of women's footballers with 100 or more international caps
