= Carina Vitulano =

Italian football referee

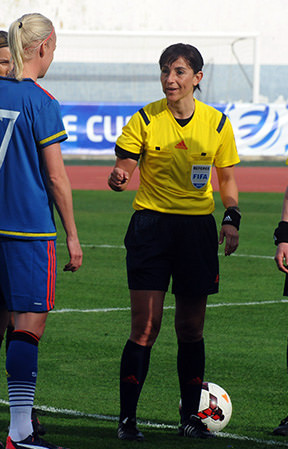
- Full name: Carina Susana Vitulano
- Born: 22 July 1975 (age 51); Buenos Aires, Argentina

Domestic
Years	League	Role
2002–	Serie D	Referee

International
Years	League	Role
2005–	FIFA listed	Referee

Carina Susana Vitulano (born 22 July 1975) is an Italian football referee. She is 169 cm (5 ft 6 1/2 in) tall and has been on the FIFA International Referees List since 2005. Vitulano shrugged off a serious knee injury sustained at the 2014 FIFA U-20 Women's World Cup to be selected for the 2015 FIFA Women's World Cup.

Carina's father Miguel Vitulano was born in Manfredonia but grew up in Argentina, where Carina was born. He returned to Italy and played football for Livorno while raising his three daughters. Miguel died of a heart attack aged 58 in 2009. Engineering graduate Carina is a mother of two children: Filippo and Alessia.
