= Viktoria Pinther =

Austrian footballer

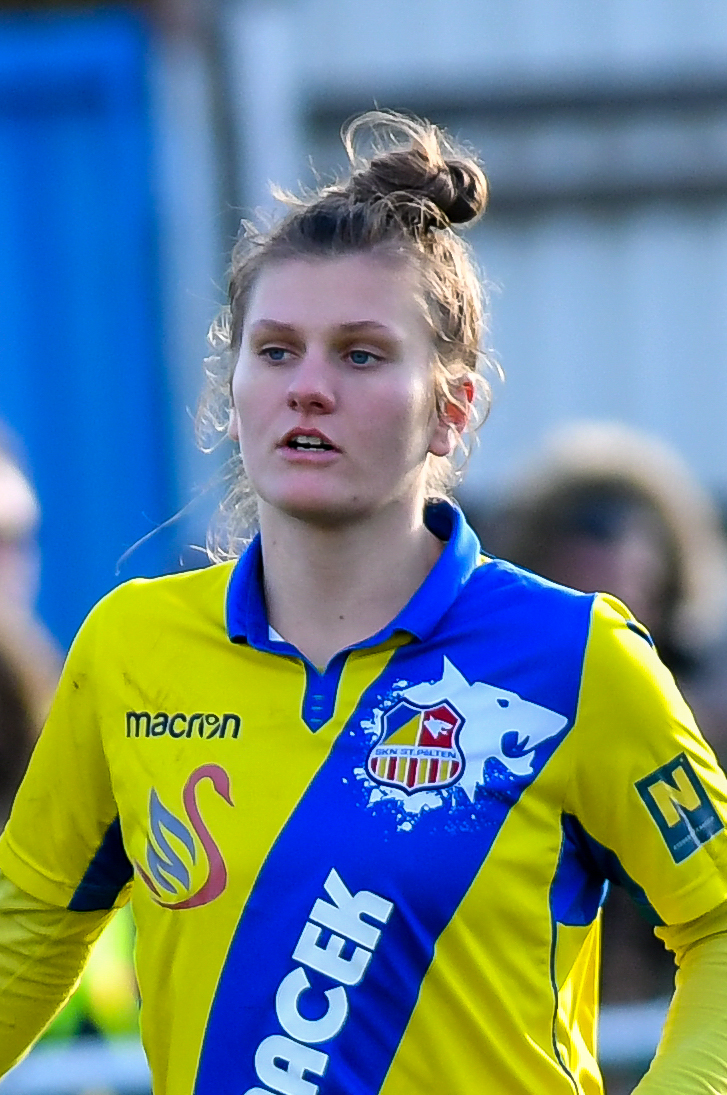
- Pinther (2017) in her team dress for SKN St. Pölten

Personal information
- Full name: Viktoria Pinther
- Date of birth: 16 October 1998 (age 28)
- Place of birth: Vienna, Austria
- Height: 1.66 m (5 ft 5 in)
- Position: Forward

Team information
- Current team: RC Strasbourg
- Number: 9

Senior career*
Years	Team	Apps	(Gls)
2013–2015	SKV Altenmarkt	26	(10)
2015–2018	St. Pölten	13	(5)
2018–2020	SC Sand	36	(3)
2020–2021	Bayer Leverkusen	8	(0)
2022–2024	Zürich	33	(12)
2024–2025	Dijon FCO	21	(7)
2025–2026	Parma	10	(0)
2026	→ Como (loan)	10	(0)
2026–	RC Strasbourg	4	(0)

International career^{‡}
2014–2015	Austria U17	15	(12)
2015–2016	Austria U19	11	(3)
2016–	Austria	49	(2)
- * Club domestic league appearances and goals as of 5 November 2026 ‡ National team caps and goals as of 22 May 2025

Viktoria Pinther (born 16 October 1998) is an Austrian footballer who plays as a forward for Première Ligue club RC Strasbourg Alsace. Pinther was part of the squad that represented Austria at the UEFA Women's Euro 2017, where the team reached the semi-finals.

== International goals ==
No.	Date	Venue	Opponent	Score	Result	Competition
1.	4 September 2018	Stadion Wiener Neustadt, Wiener Neustadt, Austria	Finland	3–1	4–1	2019 FIFA Women's World Cup qualification
2.	31 October 2023	Estádio do Varzim SC, Póvoa de Varzim, Portugal	Portugal	2–1	2–1	2023–24 UEFA Women's Nations League
