= UEFA Women's Euro 2017 =

2017 edition of the UEFA Women's Championship

Europees kampioenschap voetbal vrouwen 2017

Tournament details
- Host country: Netherlands
- Dates: 16 July – 6 August
- Teams: 16
- Venues: 7 (in 7 host cities)

Final positions
- Champions: Netherlands (1st title)
- Runners-up: Denmark

Tournament statistics
- Matches played: 31
- Goals scored: 68 (2.19 per match)
- Attendance: 247,041 (7,969 per match)
- Top scorer: (England) Jodie Taylor (5 goals)
- Best player: (Netherlands) Lieke Martens

The 2017 UEFA European Women's Championship, commonly referred to as UEFA Women's Euro 2017, was the 12th edition of the UEFA Women's Championship, the quadrennial international football championship organised by UEFA for the women's national teams of Europe. The competition was expanded to 16 teams (from 12 teams in the previous edition).

The Netherlands was chosen to host the tournament by the UEFA Executive Committee on 4 December 2014.

Germany's 22-year reign as champions of Europe was ended after losing 1–2 to Denmark in the quarter-finals. It was only Germany's second loss in the tournament since 1993. Another former winner, Norway, lost to both finalists, the Netherlands and Denmark, and ended without any goals or points.

The Netherlands won their first ever title since the men's UEFA Euro 1988 by beating fellow first time finalists Denmark 4–2 in the final.

Austria, Belgium, Portugal, Scotland and Switzerland made their debuts at the tournament.

== Host selection ==
Expressions of interest in hosting the tournament were received from seven associations.

- Austria
- France
- Israel
- Netherlands
- Poland
- Scotland
- Switzerland

On 4 December 2014 The Netherlands were chosen as hosts for the first time having never previously staged the tournament.

== Qualification ==
A total of 47 UEFA nations entered the competition (including Andorra which entered for the first time at senior women's level), and with the hosts Netherlands qualifying automatically, the other 46 teams competed in the qualifying competition to determine the remaining 15 spots in the final tournament. The qualifying competition, which took place from April 2015 to October 2016, consisted of three rounds:

- Preliminary round: The eight lowest-ranked teams were drawn into two groups of four teams. Each group was played in single round-robin format at one of the pre-selected hosts. The two group winners advanced to the qualifying group stage.
- Qualifying group stage: The 40 teams (38 highest-ranked teams and two preliminary round qualifiers) were drawn into eight groups of five teams. Each group was played in home-and-away round-robin format. The eight group winners and the six best runners-up (not counting results against the fifth-placed team) qualified directly for the final tournament, while the two remaining runners-up advanced to the play-offs.
- Play-offs: The two teams played home-and-away two-legged matches to determine the last qualified team.

=== Qualified teams ===
The following 16 teams qualified for the final tournament. Five teams made their Women's Euro debuts. The only team that qualified in 2013 but did not qualify in 2017 was Finland.

Team	Method of qualification	Date of qualification	Finals appearance	Last appearance	Previous best performance	FIFA ranking at start of event
Netherlands	Hosts	4 December 2014	3rd	2013	Semi-finals (2009)	12
France	Group 3 winners	11 April 2016	6th	2013	Quarter-finals (2009, 2013)	3
Germany	Group 5 winners	12 April 2016	10th	2013	Champions (1989, 1991, 1995, 1997, 2001, 2005, 2009, 2013)	2
Switzerland	Group 6 winners	4 June 2016	1st	—	Debut	17
England	Group 7 winners	7 June 2016	8th	2013	Runners-up (1984, 2009)	5
Norway	Group 8 winners	7 June 2016	11th	2013	Champions (1987, 1993)	11
Spain	Group 2 winners	7 June 2016	3rd	2013	Semi-finals (1997)	13
Sweden	Group 4 winners	15 September 2016	10th	2013	Champions (1984)	9
Iceland	Group 1 winners	16 September 2016	3rd	2013	Quarter-finals (2013)	19
Scotland	Group 1 runners-up	16 September 2016	1st	—	Debut	21
Belgium	Group 7 runners-up	16 September 2016	1st	—	Debut	22
Austria	Group 8 runners-up	20 September 2016	1st	—	Debut	24
Denmark	Group 4 runners-up	20 September 2016	9th	2013	Third place (1991, 1993)	15
Italy	Group 6 runners-up	20 September 2016	11th	2013	Runners-up (1993, 1997)	18
Russia	Group 5 runners-up	20 September 2016	5th	2013	Group Stage (1997, 2001, 2009, 2013)	25
Portugal	Play-offs winner	25 October 2016	1st	—	Debut	38

Notes

1. The best six runners-up among all eight groups qualified for the final tournament.

== Final draw ==
The final draw was held on 8 November 2016, 17:30 CET (UTC+1), at the Luxor Theatre in Rotterdam. The 16 teams were drawn into four groups of four teams. The teams were seeded according to their coefficient ranking following the end of the qualifying group stage (excluding the play-offs), with the hosts Netherlands assigned to position A1 in the draw. Each group contained one team from each of the four seeding pots.

Pot 1
Team	Coeff	Rank
Netherlands ^{H}	34,642	9
Germany ^{TH}	42,957	1
France	42,355	2
England	39,880	3

Pot 2
Team	Coeff	Rank
Norway	39,161	4
Sweden	38,036	5
Spain	37,655	6
Switzerland	36,629	7

Pot 3
Team	Coeff	Rank
Italy	34,775	8
Iceland	34,141	10
Scotland	33,632	11
Denmark	32,915	12

Pot 4
Team	Coeff	Rank
Austria	31,882	13
Belgium	31,213	14
Russia	30,367	15
Portugal	22,900	23

- ^{H} Hosts (assigned to position A1 in the draw)
- ^{TH} Title holders

== Venues ==
Seven venues in seven different towns were used in the tournament.

Breda	Enschede	Utrecht
Rat Verlegh Stadion	De Grolsch Veste	Stadion Galgenwaard
Capacity: 19,000	Capacity: 30,205	Capacity: 23,750
4 group matches, 1 semi-final	1 semi-final, Final	4 group matches
Rotterdam	UEFA Women's Euro 2017 is located in Netherlands	Deventer
Sparta Stadion Het Kasteel	UEFA Women's Euro 2017 is located in Netherlands	De Adelaarshorst
Capacity: 10,600	UEFA Women's Euro 2017 is located in Netherlands	Capacity: 10,500
4 group matches, 1 quarter-final	UEFA Women's Euro 2017 is located in Netherlands	4 group matches, 1 quarter-final
Tilburg	UEFA Women's Euro 2017 is located in Netherlands	Doetinchem
Koning Willem II Stadion	UEFA Women's Euro 2017 is located in Netherlands	De Vijverberg
Capacity: 14,500	UEFA Women's Euro 2017 is located in Netherlands	Capacity: 12,500
4 group matches, 1 quarter-final	UEFA Women's Euro 2017 is located in Netherlands	4 group matches, 1 quarter-final

== Match officials ==
A total of 11 referees, 21 assistant referees and 2 fourth officials were appointed for the final tournament.

Referees

- Jana Adámková (Czech Republic)
- Stéphanie Frappart (France)
- Riem Hussein (Germany)
- Bibiana Steinhaus (Germany)
- Katalin Kulcsár (Hungary)
- Carina Vitulano (Italy)
- Monika Mularczyk (Poland)
- Anastasia Pustovoitova (Russia)
- Pernilla Larsson (Sweden)
- Esther Staubli (Switzerland)
- Kateryna Monzul (Ukraine)

Assistant referees

- Sanja Rođak-Karšić (Croatia)
- Angela Kyriakou (Cyprus)
- Lucie Ratajová (Czech Republic)
- Sian Massey (England)
- Manuela Nicolosi (France)
- Christina Biehl (Germany)
- Katrin Rafalski (Germany)
- Chrysoula Kourompylia (Greece)
- Judit Kulcsár (Hungary)
- Lucia Abruzzese (Italy)
- Nicolet Bakker (Netherlands)
- Anna Dąbrowska (Poland)
- Michelle O'Neill (Republic of Ireland)
- Petruța Iugulescu (Romania)
- Mihaela Tepusa (Romania)
- Ekaterina Kurochkina (Russia)
- Svetlana Bilić (Serbia)
- Maria Sukenikova (Slovakia)
- Belinda Brem (Switzerland)
- Oleksandra Ardesheva (Ukraine)
- Maryna Striletska (Ukraine)

Fourth officials

- Lina Lehtovaara (Finland)
- Lorraine Clark (Scotland)

== Squads ==
Each national team have to submit a squad of 23 players, three of whom must be goalkeepers. If a player is injured or ill severely enough to prevent her participation in the tournament before her team's first match, she can be replaced by another player. The squad list must be published no later than 10 days before the tournaments opening match.

== Group stage ==
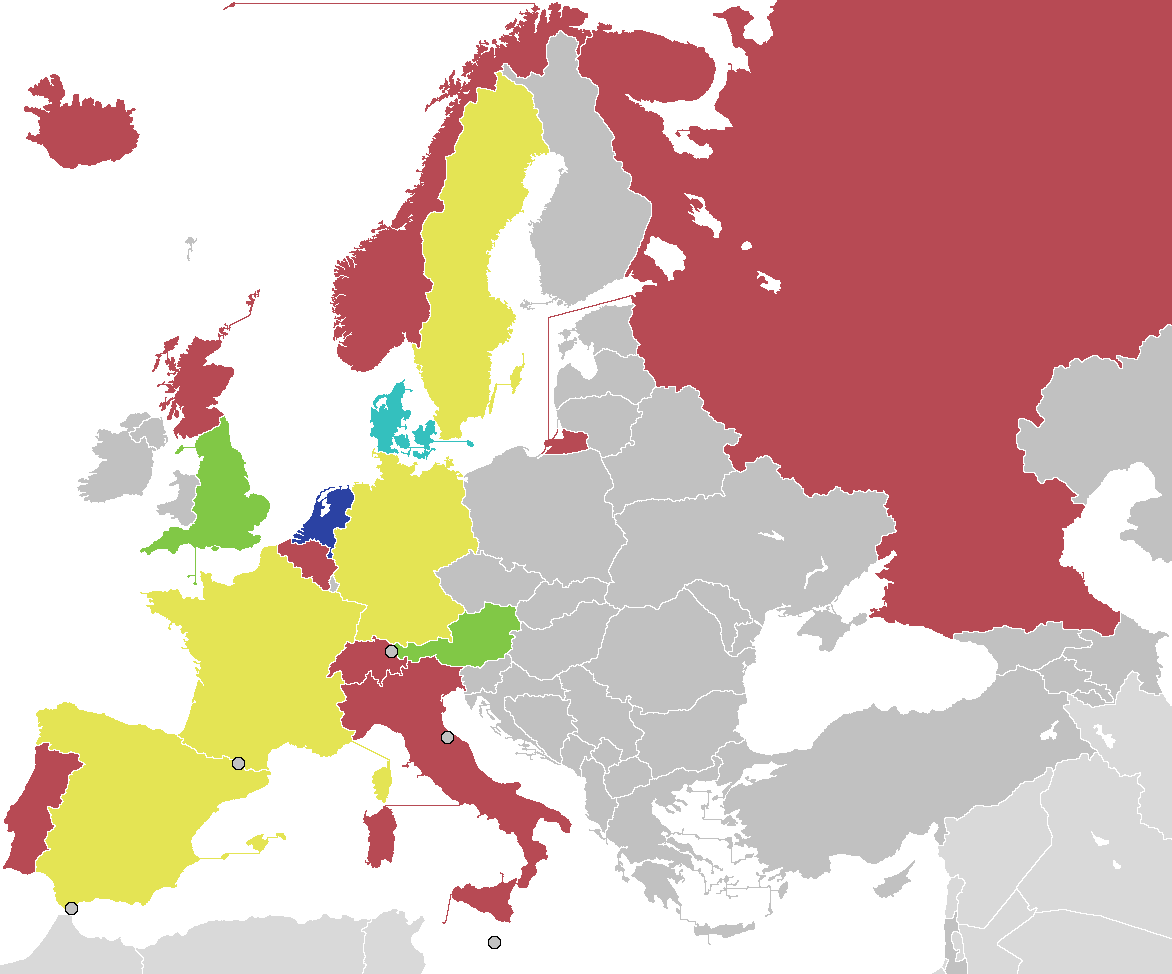
Result of teams participating in UEFA Euro 2017: Winner Runner-up / Semi-finals Quarter-finals / Group stage

The schedule of the competition was announced on 23 September 2015. The group winners and runners-up advance to the quarter-finals.

All times are local, CEST (UTC+2).

=== Tiebreakers ===
Teams are ranked according to points (3 points for a win, 1 point for a draw, 0 points for a loss), and if tied on points, the following tiebreaking criteria are applied, in the order given, to determine the rankings (Regulations Articles 19.01 and 19.02):

1. Points in head-to-head matches among tied teams;
2. Goal difference in head-to-head matches among tied teams;
3. Goals scored in head-to-head matches among tied teams;
4. If more than two teams are tied, and after applying all head-to-head criteria above, a subset of teams are still tied, all head-to-head criteria above are reapplied exclusively to this subset of teams;
5. Goal difference in all group matches;
6. Goals scored in all group matches;
7. Disciplinary points (red card = 3 points, yellow card = 1 point, expulsion for two yellow cards in one match = 3 points);
8. UEFA coefficient for the final draw.

However, these criteria do not apply if two teams tied on points, goal difference, goals scored, and goals conceded drew against each other in their final group match with serious knockout berth implications, and no other teams in the group finishes with the same number of points; in that case, the tie is broken by a penalty shootout.

=== Group A ===
Pos	Team	Pld	W	D	L	GF	GA	GD	Pts	Qualification
1	Netherlands (H)	3	3	0	0	4	1	+3	9	Knockout stage
2	Denmark	3	2	0	1	2	1	+1	6	Knockout stage
3	Belgium	3	1	0	2	3	3	0	3	
4	Norway	3	0	0	3	0	4	−4	0	

Source: UEFA
Rules for classification: Group stage tiebreakers
(H) Hosts
16 July 2017
18:00

Netherlands	1–0	Norway
Van de Sanden 66'	Report

Stadion Galgenwaard, Utrecht
Attendance: 21,732
Referee: Stéphanie Frappart (France)
16 July 2017
20:45

Denmark	1–0	Belgium
Troelsgaard 6'	Report

De Vijverberg, Doetinchem
Attendance: 5,054
Referee: Kateryna Monzul (Ukraine)

20 July 2017
18:00

Norway	0–2	Belgium
	Report	Van Gorp 59'; Cayman 67'

Rat Verlegh Stadion, Breda
Attendance: 8,477
Referee: Monika Mularczyk (Poland)
20 July 2017
20:45

Netherlands	1–0	Denmark
Spitse 20' (pen.)	Report

Sparta Stadion Het Kasteel, Rotterdam
Attendance: 10,599
Referee: Riem Hussein (Germany)

24 July 2017
20:45

Belgium	1–2	Netherlands
Wullaert 59'	Report	Spitse 27' (pen.); Martens 74'

Koning Willem II Stadion, Tilburg
Attendance: 12,697
Referee: Bibiana Steinhaus (Germany)
24 July 2017
20:45

Norway	0–1	Denmark
	Report	Veje 5'

De Adelaarshorst, Deventer
Attendance: 5,885
Referee: Stéphanie Frappart (France)

=== Group B ===
Pos	Team	Pld	W	D	L	GF	GA	GD	Pts	Qualification
1	Germany	3	2	1	0	4	1	+3	7	Knockout stage
2	Sweden	3	1	1	1	4	3	+1	4	Knockout stage
3	Russia	3	1	0	2	2	5	−3	3	
4	Italy	3	1	0	2	5	6	−1	3	

Source: UEFA
Rules for classification: Group stage tiebreakers
17 July 2017
18:00

Italy	1–2	Russia
Mauro 88'	Report	Danilova 9'; E. Morozova 26'

Sparta Stadion Het Kasteel, Rotterdam
Attendance: 669
Referee: Jana Adámková (Czech Republic)
17 July 2017
20:45

Germany	0–0	Sweden
	Report

Rat Verlegh Stadion, Breda
Attendance: 9,276
Referee: Katalin Kulcsár (Hungary)

21 July 2017
18:00

Sweden	2–0	Russia
Schelin 22'; Blackstenius 51'	Report

De Adelaarshorst, Deventer
Attendance: 5,764
Referee: Stéphanie Frappart (France)
21 July 2017
20:45

Germany	2–1	Italy
Henning 19'; Peter 67' (pen.)	Report	Mauro 29'

Koning Willem II Stadion, Tilburg
Attendance: 7,108
Referee: Kateryna Monzul (Ukraine)

25 July 2017
20:45

Russia	0–2	Germany
	Report	Peter 10' (pen.); Marozsán 56' (pen.)

Stadion Galgenwaard, Utrecht
Attendance: 6,458
Referee: Monika Mularczyk (Poland)
25 July 2017
20:45

Sweden	2–3	Italy
Schelin 14' (pen.); Blackstenius 47'	Report	Sabatino 4', 37'; Girelli 85'

De Vijverberg, Doetinchem
Attendance: 5,203
Referee: Esther Staubli (Switzerland)

=== Group C ===
Pos	Team	Pld	W	D	L	GF	GA	GD	Pts	Qualification
1	Austria	3	2	1	0	5	1	+4	7	Knockout stage
2	France	3	1	2	0	3	2	+1	5	Knockout stage
3	Switzerland	3	1	1	1	3	3	0	4	
4	Iceland	3	0	0	3	1	6	−5	0	

Source: UEFA
Rules for classification: Group stage tiebreakers
18 July 2017
18:00

Austria	1–0	Switzerland
Burger 15'	Report

De Adelaarshorst, Deventer
Attendance: 4,781
Referee: Bibiana Steinhaus (Germany)
18 July 2017
20:45

France	1–0	Iceland
Le Sommer 86' (pen.)	Report

Koning Willem II Stadion, Tilburg
Attendance: 4,894
Referee: Carina Vitulano (Italy)

22 July 2017
18:00

Iceland	1–2	Switzerland
Friðriksdóttir 33'	Report	Dickenmann 43'; Bachmann 52'

De Vijverberg, Doetinchem
Attendance: 5,647
Referee: Anastasia Pustovoitova (Russia)
22 July 2017
20:45

France	1–1	Austria
Henry 51'	Report	Makas 27'

Stadion Galgenwaard, Utrecht
Attendance: 4,387
Referee: Jana Adámková (Czech Republic)

26 July 2017
20:45

Switzerland	1–1	France
Crnogorčević 19'	Report	Abily 76'

Rat Verlegh Stadion, Breda
Attendance: 3,347
Referee: Katalin Kulcsár (Hungary)
26 July 2017
20:45

Iceland	0–3	Austria
	Report	Zadrazil 36'; Burger 44'; Enzinger 89'

Sparta Stadion Het Kasteel, Rotterdam
Attendance: 4,893
Referee: Riem Hussein (Germany)

=== Group D ===
Pos	Team	Pld	W	D	L	GF	GA	GD	Pts	Qualification
1	England	3	3	0	0	10	1	+9	9	Knockout stage
2	Spain	3	1	0	2	2	3	−1	3 (Note: Tied on head-to-head points (3). Head-to-head goal difference: Spain +1, Scotland 0, Portugal −1.)	Knockout stage
3	Scotland	3	1	0	2	2	8	−6	3	
4	Portugal	3	1	0	2	3	5	−2	3	

Source: UEFA
Rules for classification: Group stage tiebreakers
Notes:
19 July 2017
18:00

Spain	2–0	Portugal
Losada 23'; Sampedro 42'	Report

De Vijverberg, Doetinchem
Attendance: 3,188
Referee: Pernilla Larsson (Sweden)
19 July 2017
20:45

England	6–0	Scotland
Taylor 11', 26', 53'; White 32'; Nobbs 87'; Duggan 90+3'	Report

Stadion Galgenwaard, Utrecht
Attendance: 5,578
Referee: Esther Staubli (Switzerland)

23 July 2017
18:00

Scotland	1–2	Portugal
Cuthbert 68'	Report	C. Mendes 27'; Leite 72'

Sparta Stadion Het Kasteel, Rotterdam
Attendance: 3,123
Referee: Katalin Kulcsár (Hungary)
23 July 2017
20:45

England	2–0	Spain
Kirby 2'; Taylor 85'	Report

Rat Verlegh Stadion, Breda
Attendance: 4,879
Referee: Carina Vitulano (Italy)

27 July 2017
20:45

Portugal	1–2	England
C. Mendes 17'	Report	Duggan 7'; Parris 48'

Koning Willem II Stadion, Tilburg
Attendance: 3,335
Referee: Kateryna Monzul (Ukraine)
27 July 2017
20:45

Scotland	1–0	Spain
Weir 42'	Report

De Adelaarshorst, Deventer
Attendance: 4,840
Referee: Jana Adámková (Czech Republic)

== Knockout stage ==
In the knockout stage, extra time and penalty shoot-out are used to decide the winner if necessary.

On 1 June 2017, the UEFA Executive Committee agreed that the competition would be part of the International Football Association Board (IFAB)'s trial to allow a fourth substitute to be made during extra time.

=== Bracket ===
Quarter-finals
29 July – Doetinchem
Netherlands	2
Sweden	0
30 July – Deventer
England	1
France	0
30 July – Rotterdam
Germany	1
Denmark	2
30 July – Tilburg
Austria (p)	0 (5)
Spain	0 (3)

Semi-finals
3 August – Enschede
Netherlands	3
England	0
3 August – Breda
Denmark (p)	0 (3)
Austria	0 (0)

Final
6 August – Enschede
Netherlands	4
Denmark	2

=== Quarter-finals ===
29 July 2017
18:00

Netherlands	2–0	Sweden
Martens 33'; Miedema 64'	Report

De Vijverberg, Doetinchem
Attendance: 11,106
Referee: Bibiana Steinhaus (Germany)

30 July 2017 (Note: The Germany v Denmark match, originally scheduled on 29 July 2017, 20:45 CEST, was postponed to the following day due to adverse weather conditions.)
12:00

Germany	1–2	Denmark
Kerschowski 3'	Report	Nadim 49'; T. Nielsen 83'

Sparta Stadion Het Kasteel, Rotterdam
Attendance: 5,251
Referee: Katalin Kulcsár (Hungary)

30 July 2017
18:00

Austria	0–0 (a.e.t.)	Spain
	Report
Penalties
Feiersinger (penalty scored); Burger (penalty scored); Aschauer (penalty scored); Pinther (penalty scored); Puntigam (penalty scored)	5–3	(penalty scored) García; (penalty scored) Sampedro; (penalty missed) Meseguer; (penalty scored) Corredera

Koning Willem II Stadion, Tilburg
Attendance: 3,488
Referee: Stéphanie Frappart (France)

30 July 2017
20:45

England	1–0	France
Taylor 60'	Report

De Adelaarshorst, Deventer
Attendance: 6,283
Referee: Esther Staubli (Switzerland)

=== Semi-finals ===
3 August 2017
18:00

Denmark	0–0 (a.e.t.)	Austria
	Report
Penalties
Nadim (penalty scored); Harder (penalty scored); Junge (penalty missed); Boye Sørensen (penalty scored)	3–0	(penalty missed) Feiersinger; (penalty missed) Pinther; (penalty missed) Aschauer

Rat Verlegh Stadion, Breda
Attendance: 11,312
Referee: Kateryna Monzul (Ukraine)

3 August 2017
20:45

Netherlands	3–0	England
Miedema 22'; Van de Donk 62'; Bright 90+3' (o.g.)	Report

De Grolsch Veste, Enschede
Attendance: 27,093
Referee: Stéphanie Frappart (France)

=== Final ===
6 August 2017
17:00

Netherlands	4–2	Denmark
Miedema 10', 89'; Martens 28'; Spitse 51'	Report	Nadim 6' (pen.); Harder 33'

De Grolsch Veste, Enschede
Attendance: 28,182
Referee: Esther Staubli (Switzerland)

== Statistics ==
=== Goalscorers ===
5 goals

- (England) Jodie Taylor

4 goals

- (Netherlands) Vivianne Miedema

3 goals

- (Netherlands) Lieke Martens
- (Netherlands) Sherida Spitse

2 goals

- (Austria) Nina Burger
- (Denmark) Nadia Nadim
- (England) Toni Duggan
- (Germany) Babett Peter
- (Italy) Ilaria Mauro
- (Italy) Daniela Sabatino
- (Portugal) Carolina Mendes
- (Sweden) Stina Blackstenius
- (Sweden) Lotta Schelin

1 goal

- (Austria) Stefanie Enzinger
- (Austria) Lisa Makas
- (Austria) Sarah Zadrazil
- (Belgium) Janice Cayman
- (Belgium) Elke Van Gorp
- (Belgium) Tessa Wullaert
- (Denmark) Pernille Harder
- (Denmark) Theresa Nielsen
- (Denmark) Sanne Troelsgaard
- (Denmark) Katrine Veje
- (England) Fran Kirby
- (England) Jordan Nobbs
- (England) Nikita Parris
- (England) Ellen White
- (France) Camille Abily
- (France) Amandine Henry
- (France) Eugénie Le Sommer
- (Germany) Josephine Henning
- (Germany) Isabel Kerschowski
- (Germany) Dzsenifer Marozsán
- (Iceland) Fanndís Friðriksdóttir
- (Italy) Cristiana Girelli
- (Netherlands) Daniëlle van de Donk
- (Netherlands) Shanice van de Sanden
- (Portugal) Ana Leite
- (Russia) Elena Danilova
- (Russia) Elena Morozova
- (Scotland) Erin Cuthbert
- (Scotland) Caroline Weir
- (Spain) Vicky Losada
- (Spain) Amanda Sampedro
- (Switzerland) Ramona Bachmann
- (Switzerland) Ana-Maria Crnogorčević
- (Switzerland) Lara Dickenmann

Own goal

- (England) Millie Bright (playing against Netherlands)

Source: UEFA.com

=== Awards ===
The following awards were given at the conclusion of the tournament by UEFA.

Individual awards
Player of the Tournament	(Netherlands) Lieke Martens
Golden Boot	(England) Jodie Taylor; 5 goals 0 assists 328 minutes played
Silver Boot	(Netherlands) Vivianne Miedema; 4 goals 0 assists 536 minutes played
Bronze Boot	(Netherlands) Lieke Martens; 3 goals 2 assists 525 minutes played

=== UEFA Team of the Tournament ===
The UEFA Women's EURO 2017 Team of the Tournament was selected by UEFA technical observers.

Goalkeeper	Defenders	Midfielders	Forwards
(Netherlands) Sari van Veenendaal	(England) Lucy Bronze (Netherlands) Anouk Dekker (England) Steph Houghton (Austria) Verena Aschauer	(Denmark) Theresa Nielsen (Netherlands) Jackie Groenen (Netherlands) Sherida Spitse (Netherlands) Lieke Martens	(Denmark) Pernille Harder (England) Jodie Taylor

== Prize money ==
Total prize money of €8 million was available, an increase from €2.2 million in 2013, with the following breakdown:

Stage	Prize money	Teams
Group stage	€300,000	8
Quarter-finals	€500,000	4
Semi-finals	€700,000	2
Runners-up	€1,000,000	1
Champions	€1,200,000	1

== Broadcasting rights ==
Matches were streamed on UEFA.com and UEFA.tv (YouTube) in territories where no partner had been appointed.

- Andorra – TVE, France Télévisions
- Austria – ORF
- Belgium – RTBF / VRT
- Brazil – Globosat
- Chile – Telecanal
- Denmark – DR / TV 2
- Ecuador – RedTeleSistema
- Finland – Yle
- France – France Télévisions
- Germany – ARD / ZDF
- Hong Kong – iCable
- Iceland – RÚV
- Indonesia – MNC / RCTI
- Italy – Nuvola61 / RAI
- Malaysia – Astro
- Monaco – France Télévisions
- Netherlands – NOS
- Norway – NRK / TV 2
- Portugal – RTP
- Russia – Match TV
- Spain – TVE
- Sweden – TV4 / SVT
- Switzerland – SRG SSR
- United Kingdom – Channel 4 More4
- United States – ESPN / Univision
- Caribbean – ESPN
- Middle East / North Africa – Eurosport / beIN Sports
- Sub-Saharan Africa – Econet (Kwesé Sports)
- Europe – Eurosport
