= UEFA Women's Euro 2017 squads =

International football competition

Each national team have to submit a squad of 23 players, three of whom must be goalkeepers. If a player is injured or ill severely enough to prevent her participation in the tournament before her team's first match, she can be replaced by another player. The squad list must be published no later than 10 days before the tournaments opening match.

Age, caps, goals and clubs are correct as of 16 July 2017.

== Group A ==
=== Belgium ===
The squad was announced on 25 June 2017.

Head coach: Ives Serneels

No.	Pos.	Player	Date of birth (age)	Caps	Goals	Club
1	GK	Justien Odeurs	30 May 1997 (aged 20)	22	0	(German Football Association) FF USV Jena
2	DF	Davina Philtjens	26 February 1989 (aged 28)	57	7	(Royal Dutch Football Association) Ajax
3	DF	Heleen Jaques	20 April 1988 (aged 29)	77	1	(Royal Belgian Football Association) Anderlecht
4	DF	Maud Coutereels	21 May 1986 (aged 31)	69	9	(French Football Federation) Lille
5	DF	Lorca Van De Putte	3 April 1988 (aged 29)	55	2	(Swedish Football Association) Kristianstad
6	MF	Tine De Caigny	9 June 1997 (aged 20)	30	7	(Royal Belgian Football Association) Anderlecht
7	MF	Elke Van Gorp	12 May 1995 (aged 22)	20	6	(Royal Belgian Football Association) Anderlecht
8	MF	Lenie Onzia	30 May 1989 (aged 28)	34	4	(Royal Dutch Football Association) Twente
9	FW	Tessa Wullaert	19 March 1993 (aged 24)	59	32	(German Football Association) VfL Wolfsburg
10	FW	Aline Zeler (c)	2 June 1983 (aged 34)	94	28	(Royal Belgian Football Association) Anderlecht
11	FW	Janice Cayman	12 October 1988 (aged 28)	69	20	(French Football Federation) Montpellier
12	GK	Diede Lemey	7 October 1996 (aged 20)	4	0	(Royal Belgian Football Association) Anderlecht
13	MF	Sara Yuceil	22 June 1988 (aged 29)	21	2	(Royal Dutch Football Association) PSV Eindhoven
14	FW	Davinia Vanmechelen	30 August 1999 (aged 17)	11	3	(Royal Belgian Football Association) Gent
15	FW	Yana Daniëls	8 May 1992 (aged 25)	27	4	(The Football Association) Bristol City
16	MF	Nicky Van Den Abbeele	21 February 1994 (aged 23)	29	0	(Royal Belgian Football Association) Anderlecht
17	FW	Jana Coryn	26 June 1992 (aged 25)	20	1	(French Football Federation) Lille
18	MF	Laura De Neve	9 October 1994 (aged 22)	12	0	(Royal Belgian Football Association) Anderlecht
19	DF	Imke Courtois	14 March 1988 (aged 29)	21	0	(Royal Belgian Football Association) Standard Liège
20	MF	Julie Biesmans	4 May 1994 (aged 23)	47	2	(Royal Belgian Football Association) Standard Liège
21	GK	Nicky Evrard	26 May 1995 (aged 22)	16	0	(Royal Dutch Football Association) Twente
22	DF	Laura Deloose	19 June 1993 (aged 24)	19	2	(Royal Belgian Football Association) Anderlecht
23	DF	Elien Van Wynendaele	19 February 1995 (aged 22)	19	1	(Royal Belgian Football Association) Gent

=== Denmark ===
The squad was announced on 19 June 2017.

Head coach: Nils Nielsen

No.	Pos.	Player	Date of birth (age)	Caps	Goals	Club
1	GK	Stina Lykke Petersen	9 February 1986 (aged 31)	66	0	(Danish Football Association) Kolding
2	DF	Line Røddik Hansen	31 January 1988 (aged 29)	126	13	(Royal Spanish Football Federation) Barcelona
3	DF	Janni Arnth	15 October 1986 (aged 30)	75	1	(Swedish Football Association) Linköping
4	MF	Maja Kildemoes	15 August 1996 (aged 20)	17	1	(Swedish Football Association) Linköping
5	DF	Simone Boye Sørensen	3 March 1992 (aged 25)	41	4	(Swedish Football Association) Rosengård
6	MF	Nanna Christiansen	17 June 1989 (aged 28)	78	6	(Danish Football Association) Brøndby
7	MF	Sanne Troelsgaard Nielsen	15 August 1988 (aged 28)	111	37	(Swedish Football Association) Rosengård
8	DF	Theresa Nielsen	20 July 1986 (aged 30)	109	3	(Norwegian Football Federation) Vålerenga
9	FW	Nadia Nadim	2 January 1988 (aged 29)	67	19	(United States Soccer Federation) Portland Thorns
10	FW	Pernille Harder (c)	15 November 1992 (aged 24)	86	46	(German Football Association) VfL Wolfsburg
11	MF	Katrine Veje	19 June 1991 (aged 26)	96	8	(French Football Federation) Montpellier
12	FW	Stine Larsen	24 January 1996 (aged 21)	23	7	(Danish Football Association) Brøndby
13	MF	Sofie Junge Pedersen	24 April 1992 (aged 25)	43	4	(Swedish Football Association) Rosengård
14	FW	Nicoline Sørensen	15 August 1997 (aged 19)	8	1	(Swedish Football Association) Linköping
15	DF	Frederikke Thøgersen	24 July 1995 (aged 21)	25	0	(Danish Football Association) Fortuna Hjørring
16	GK	Maria Lindblad Christensen	3 July 1995 (aged 22)	1	0	(Danish Football Association) Fortuna Hjørring
17	MF	Line Sigvardsen Jensen	23 August 1991 (aged 25)	61	2	(United States Soccer Federation) Washington Spirit
18	DF	Mie Leth Jans	6 February 1994 (aged 23)	19	0	(The Football Association) Manchester City
19	DF	Cecilie Sandvej	13 June 1990 (aged 27)	26	1	(German Football Association) 1. FFC Frankfurt
20	DF	Stine Ballisager Pedersen	3 January 1994 (aged 23)	2	0	(Danish Football Association) Skovbakken
21	MF	Sarah Dyrehauge Hansen	14 September 1996 (aged 20)	9	2	(Danish Football Association) Fortuna Hjørring
22	GK	Line Geltzer Johansen	26 July 1989 (aged 27)	3	0	(Danish Football Association) Vejle B
23	DF	Luna Gevitz	3 March 1994 (aged 23)	10	0	(Danish Football Association) Fortuna Hjørring

=== Netherlands ===
The squad was announced on 14 June 2017.

Head coach: Sarina Wiegman

No.	Pos.	Player	Date of birth (age)	Caps	Goals	Club
1	GK	Sari van Veenendaal	3 April 1990 (aged 27)	32	0	(The Football Association) Arsenal
2	DF	Desiree van Lunteren	30 December 1992 (aged 24)	46	0	(Royal Dutch Football Association) Ajax
3	DF	Stefanie van der Gragt	16 August 1992 (aged 24)	37	3	(Royal Dutch Football Association) Ajax
4	DF	Mandy van den Berg (c)	26 August 1990 (aged 26)	86	6	(The Football Association) Reading
5	DF	Kika van Es	11 October 1991 (aged 25)	37	0	(Royal Dutch Football Association) Twente
6	DF	Anouk Dekker	15 November 1986 (aged 30)	61	6	(French Football Federation) Montpellier
7	FW	Shanice van de Sanden	2 October 1992 (aged 24)	40	9	(The Football Association) Liverpool
8	MF	Sherida Spitse	29 May 1990 (aged 27)	132	20	(Royal Dutch Football Association) Twente
9	FW	Vivianne Miedema	15 July 1996 (aged 21)	51	41	(The Football Association) Arsenal
10	MF	Daniëlle van de Donk	5 August 1991 (aged 25)	65	10	(The Football Association) Arsenal
11	MF	Lieke Martens	16 December 1992 (aged 24)	74	30	(Royal Spanish Football Federation) Barcelona
12	MF	Jill Roord	22 April 1997 (aged 20)	16	3	(German Football Association) Bayern Munich
13	FW	Renate Jansen	7 December 1990 (aged 26)	15	3	(Royal Dutch Football Association) Twente
14	MF	Jackie Groenen	17 December 1994 (aged 22)	19	1	(German Football Association) 1. FFC Frankfurt
15	MF	Sisca Folkertsma	21 May 1997 (aged 20)	7	0	(Royal Dutch Football Association) Ajax
16	GK	Angela Christ	6 March 1989 (aged 28)	16	0	(Royal Dutch Football Association) PSV Eindhoven
17	DF	Kelly Zeeman	19 November 1993 (aged 23)	18	0	(Royal Dutch Football Association) Ajax
18	FW	Vanity Lewerissa	1 April 1991 (aged 26)	9	0	(Royal Dutch Football Association) PSV Eindhoven
19	MF	Sheila van den Bulk	6 April 1989 (aged 28)	4	0	(Swedish Football Association) Djurgården
20	DF	Dominique Janssen	17 January 1995 (aged 22)	22	0	(The Football Association) Arsenal
21	FW	Lineth Beerensteyn	11 October 1996 (aged 20)	14	3	(German Football Association) Bayern Munich
22	DF	Liza van der Most	8 October 1993 (aged 23)	6	0	(Royal Dutch Football Association) Ajax
23	GK	Loes Geurts	12 January 1986 (aged 31)	117	0	(French Football Federation) Paris Saint-Germain

=== Norway ===
The squad was announced on 28 June 2017.

Head coach: Martin Sjögren

No.	Pos.	Player	Date of birth (age)	Caps	Goals	Club
1	GK	Ingrid Hjelmseth	10 April 1980 (aged 37)	112	0	(Norwegian Football Federation) Stabæk
2	MF	Ingrid Moe Wold	29 January 1990 (aged 27)	38	3	(Norwegian Football Federation) Lillestrøm
3	DF	Maria Thorisdottir	5 June 1993 (aged 24)	14	0	(Norwegian Football Federation) Klepp
4	MF	Guro Reiten	26 July 1994 (aged 22)	14	1	(Norwegian Football Federation) Lillestrøm
5	MF	Tuva Hansen	4 August 1997 (aged 19)	2	0	(Norwegian Football Federation) Klepp
6	MF	Maren Mjelde (c)	6 November 1989 (aged 27)	116	17	(The Football Association) Chelsea
7	MF	Ingrid Schjelderup	21 December 1987 (aged 29)	16	0	(Swedish Football Association) Eskilstuna United
8	MF	Andrine Hegerberg	6 June 1993 (aged 24)	24	1	(The Football Association) Birmingham City
9	FW	Elise Thorsnes	14 August 1988 (aged 28)	105	16	(Norwegian Football Federation) Avaldsnes
10	FW	Caroline Graham Hansen	18 February 1995 (aged 22)	48	15	(German Football Association) VfL Wolfsburg
11	DF	Nora Holstad Berge	26 March 1987 (aged 30)	66	2	(German Football Association) Bayern Munich
12	GK	Cecilie Fiskerstrand	20 March 1996 (aged 21)	14	0	(Norwegian Football Federation) Lillestrøm
13	DF	Stine Reinås	15 July 1994 (aged 23)	5	1	(Norwegian Football Federation) Stabæk
14	FW	Ada Hegerberg	10 July 1995 (aged 22)	63	38	(French Football Federation) Lyon
15	FW	Lisa-Marie Karlseng Utland	19 September 1992 (aged 24)	20	2	(Norwegian Football Federation) Røa
16	DF	Anja Sønstevold	21 June 1992 (aged 25)	12	0	(Norwegian Football Federation) Lillestrøm
17	MF	Kristine Minde	8 August 1992 (aged 24)	76	9	(Swedish Football Association) Linköping
18	DF	Frida Maanum	16 July 1999 (aged 18)	1	0	(Norwegian Football Federation) Stabæk
19	MF	Ingvild Isaksen	10 February 1989 (aged 28)	59	3	(Norwegian Football Federation) Stabæk
20	FW	Emilie Haavi	16 June 1992 (aged 25)	61	15	(United States Soccer Federation) Boston Breakers
21	DF	Kristine Bjørdal Leine	6 August 1996 (aged 20)	0	0	(Norwegian Football Federation) Røa
22	MF	Ingrid Marie Spord	12 July 1994 (aged 23)	7	0	(Norwegian Football Federation) Lillestrøm
23	GK	Oda Maria Hove Bogstad	24 April 1996 (aged 21)	0	0	(Norwegian Football Federation) Klepp

== Group B ==
=== Germany ===
A 29-player squad was announced on 10 May 2017. The final squad was revealed on 30 June 2017.

Head coach: Steffi Jones

No.	Pos.	Player	Date of birth (age)	Caps	Goals	Club
1	GK	Almuth Schult	9 February 1991 (aged 26)	42	0	(German Football Association) VfL Wolfsburg
2	DF	Josephine Henning	8 September 1989 (aged 27)	40	1	(French Football Federation) Lyon
3	DF	Kathrin Hendrich	6 April 1992 (aged 25)	15	1	(German Football Association) 1. FFC Frankfurt
4	DF	Leonie Maier	29 September 1992 (aged 24)	54	8	(German Football Association) Bayern Munich
5	DF	Babett Peter	12 May 1988 (aged 29)	107	5	(German Football Association) VfL Wolfsburg
6	DF	Kristin Demann	7 April 1993 (aged 24)	10	0	(German Football Association) Bayern Munich
7	DF	Carolin Simon	24 November 1992 (aged 24)	3	0	(German Football Association) SC Freiburg
8	MF	Lena Goeßling	8 March 1986 (aged 31)	93	10	(German Football Association) VfL Wolfsburg
9	FW	Mandy Islacker	8 August 1988 (aged 28)	15	5	(German Football Association) Bayern Munich
10	MF	Dzsenifer Marozsán (c)	18 April 1992 (aged 25)	74	30	(French Football Federation) Lyon
11	FW	Anja Mittag	16 May 1985 (aged 32)	154	50	(Swedish Football Association) Rosengård
12	GK	Laura Benkarth	14 October 1992 (aged 24)	5	0	(German Football Association) SC Freiburg
13	MF	Sara Däbritz	15 February 1995 (aged 22)	42	8	(German Football Association) Bayern Munich
14	DF	Anna Blässe	27 February 1987 (aged 30)	18	0	(German Football Association) VfL Wolfsburg
15	MF	Sara Doorsoun	17 November 1991 (aged 25)	8	0	(German Football Association) SGS Essen
16	MF	Linda Dallmann	2 September 1994 (aged 22)	5	2	(German Football Association) SGS Essen
17	DF	Isabel Kerschowski	22 January 1988 (aged 29)	19	3	(German Football Association) VfL Wolfsburg
18	FW	Lena Petermann	5 February 1994 (aged 23)	12	4	(German Football Association) SC Freiburg
19	FW	Svenja Huth	25 January 1991 (aged 26)	27	0	(German Football Association) Turbine Potsdam
20	MF	Lina Magull	15 August 1994 (aged 22)	11	2	(German Football Association) SC Freiburg
21	GK	Lisa Weiß	29 October 1987 (aged 29)	4	0	(German Football Association) SGS Essen
22	MF	Tabea Kemme	14 December 1991 (aged 25)	39	2	(German Football Association) Turbine Potsdam
23	FW	Hasret Kayikçi	6 November 1991 (aged 25)	4	1	(German Football Association) SC Freiburg

=== Italy ===
A 30-player squad was announced on 19 June 2017. The final squad was released on 5 July 2017.

Head coach: Antonio Cabrini

No.	Pos.	Player	Date of birth (age)	Caps	Goals	Club
1	GK	Laura Giuliani	5 June 1993 (aged 24)	23	0	(German Football Association) SC Freiburg
2	DF	Cecilia Salvai	2 December 1993 (aged 23)	30	1	(Italian Football Federation) Brescia
3	DF	Sara Gama	27 March 1989 (aged 28)	23	1	(Italian Football Federation) Brescia
4	MF	Daniela Stracchi	2 September 1983 (aged 33)	48	2	(Italian Football Federation) Mozzanica
5	DF	Elena Linari	15 April 1994 (aged 23)	49	0	(Italian Football Federation) Fiorentina
6	FW	Sandy Iannella	6 April 1987 (aged 30)	32	1	(Italian Football Federation) Cuneo
7	DF	Alia Guagni	1 October 1987 (aged 29)	37	5	(Italian Football Federation) Fiorentina
8	FW	Melania Gabbiadini (c)	28 August 1983 (aged 33)	88	39	(Italian Football Federation) Verona
9	FW	Ilaria Mauro	22 May 1988 (aged 29)	24	8	(Italian Football Federation) Fiorentina
10	MF	Martina Rosucci	9 May 1992 (aged 25)	43	3	(Italian Football Federation) Brescia
11	MF	Barbara Bonansea	13 June 1991 (aged 26)	37	14	(Italian Football Federation) Brescia
12	GK	Chiara Marchitelli	4 May 1985 (aged 32)	15	0	(Italian Football Federation) Brescia
13	DF	Elisa Bartoli	7 May 1991 (aged 26)	35	1	(Italian Football Federation) Fiorentina
14	DF	Linda Tucceri Cimini	4 April 1991 (aged 26)	11	0	(Italian Football Federation) San Zaccaria
15	MF	Laura Fusetti	8 October 1990 (aged 26)	0	0	(Italian Football Federation) Como
16	MF	Manuela Giugliano	18 August 1997 (aged 19)	8	2	(Italian Football Federation) Verona
17	DF	Federica Di Criscio	12 May 1993 (aged 24)	32	0	(Italian Football Federation) Verona
18	FW	Daniela Sabatino	26 June 1985 (aged 32)	33	12	(Italian Football Federation) Brescia
19	MF	Aurora Galli	13 December 1996 (aged 20)	28	3	(Italian Football Federation) Verona
20	MF	Valentina Cernoia	22 June 1991 (aged 26)	29	6	(Italian Football Federation) Brescia
21	MF	Marta Carissimi	3 May 1987 (aged 30)	32	2	(Italian Football Federation) Fiorentina
22	GK	Katja Schroffenegger	28 April 1991 (aged 26)	15	0	(Italian Football Federation) Unterland
23	FW	Cristiana Girelli	23 April 1990 (aged 27)	37	14	(Italian Football Federation) Brescia

=== Russia ===
The squad was announced on 29 June 2017.

Head coach: Elena Fomina

No.	Pos.	Player	Date of birth (age)	Caps	Goals	Club
1	GK	Tatyana Shcherbak	22 October 1997 (aged 19)	3	0	(Russian Football Union) Kubanochka
2	MF	Natalya Solodkaya	4 April 1995 (aged 22)	0	0	(Russian Football Union) Kubanochka
3	DF	Anna Kozhnikova (c)	10 July 1987 (aged 30)	71	5	(Russian Football Union) CSKA Moscow
4	DF	Tatiana Sheykina	14 November 1991 (aged 25)	13	0	(Russian Football Union) Ryazan VDV
5	DF	Viktoriya Shkoda	21 December 1999 (aged 17)	0	0	(Russian Football Union) Kubanochka
6	FW	Nadezhda Karpova	9 March 1995 (aged 22)	12	4	(Russian Football Union) Chertanovo Moscow
7	MF	Anastasia Pozdeeva	12 June 1993 (aged 24)	16	0	(Russian Football Union) Zvezda-2005
8	DF	Daria Makarenko	7 March 1992 (aged 25)	49	3	(Russian Football Union) Ryazan VDV
9	MF	Anna Cholovyaga	8 May 1992 (aged 25)	47	4	(Russian Football Union) CSKA Moscow
10	MF	Nadezhda Smirnova	22 February 1996 (aged 21)	5	0	(Russian Football Union) CSKA Moscow
11	FW	Ekaterina Sochneva	12 August 1985 (aged 31)	87	21	(Russian Football Union) CSKA Moscow
12	GK	Alena Belyaeva	13 February 1992 (aged 25)	6	0	(Russian Football Union) Chertanovo Moscow
13	DF	Anna Belomyttseva	24 November 1996 (aged 20)	5	0	(Russian Football Union) Ryazan VDV
14	MF	Nasiba Gasanova	15 December 1994 (aged 22)	0	0	(Russian Football Union) Kubanochka
15	FW	Elena Danilova	17 June 1987 (aged 30)	33	11	(Russian Football Union) Ryazan VDV
16	FW	Marina Fedorova	10 May 1997 (aged 20)	4	0	(Russian Football Union) Ryazan VDV
17	FW	Ekaterina Pantyukhina	9 April 1993 (aged 24)	38	12	(Russian Football Union) Zvezda-2005
18	MF	Elvira Ziyastinova	13 February 1991 (aged 26)	19	0	(Russian Football Union) CSKA Moscow
19	DF	Ekaterina Morozova	26 March 1991 (aged 26)	3	0	(Russian Football Union) Chertanovo Moscow
20	MF	Margarita Chernomyrdina	6 March 1996 (aged 21)	24	2	(Russian Football Union) Chertanovo Moscow
21	GK	Yulia Grichenko	10 March 1990 (aged 27)	14	0	(Russian Football Union) Rossiyanka
22	FW	Marina Kiskonen	19 March 1994 (aged 23)	0	0	(Russian Football Union) Chertanovo Moscow
23	MF	Elena Morozova	15 March 1987 (aged 30)	91	19	(Russian Football Union) Kubanochka

=== Sweden ===
The squad was announced on 20 June 2017.

Head coach: Pia Sundhage

No.	Pos.	Player	Date of birth (age)	Caps	Goals	Club
1	GK	Hedvig Lindahl	29 April 1983 (aged 34)	138	0	(The Football Association) Chelsea
2	MF	Jonna Andersson	2 January 1993 (aged 24)	18	0	(Swedish Football Association) Linköping
3	DF	Linda Sembrant	15 May 1987 (aged 30)	85	8	(French Football Federation) Montpellier
4	DF	Emma Berglund	19 December 1988 (aged 28)	54	1	(French Football Federation) Paris Saint-Germain
5	DF	Nilla Fischer	2 August 1984 (aged 32)	160	22	(German Football Association) VfL Wolfsburg
6	DF	Magdalena Eriksson	8 September 1993 (aged 23)	26	4	(The Football Association) Chelsea
7	MF	Lisa Dahlkvist	6 February 1987 (aged 30)	130	11	(Swedish Football Association) Örebro
8	FW	Lotta Schelin	27 February 1984 (aged 33)	181	86	(Swedish Football Association) Rosengård
9	MF	Kosovare Asllani	29 July 1989 (aged 27)	102	27	(The Football Association) Manchester City
10	MF	Julia Spetsmark	30 June 1989 (aged 28)	2	0	(Swedish Football Association) Örebro
11	FW	Stina Blackstenius	5 February 1996 (aged 21)	23	3	(French Football Federation) Montpellier
12	GK	Hilda Carlén	13 August 1991 (aged 25)	7	0	(Swedish Football Association) Piteå
13	MF	Josefin Johansson	17 March 1988 (aged 29)	9	0	(Swedish Football Association) Piteå
14	MF	Hanna Folkesson	15 June 1988 (aged 29)	34	0	(Swedish Football Association) Rosengård
15	DF	Jessica Samuelsson	30 January 1992 (aged 25)	50	0	(Swedish Football Association) Linköping
16	DF	Hanna Glas	17 September 1992 (aged 24)	6	0	(Swedish Football Association) Eskilstuna United
17	MF	Caroline Seger (c)	19 March 1985 (aged 32)	171	24	(French Football Federation) Lyon
18	FW	Fridolina Rolfö	24 November 1993 (aged 23)	21	5	(German Football Association) Bayern Munich
19	FW	Pauline Hammarlund	7 May 1994 (aged 23)	17	4	(Swedish Football Association) Kopparbergs/Göteborg
20	FW	Mimmi Larsson	9 April 1994 (aged 23)	5	1	(Swedish Football Association) Eskilstuna United
21	GK	Emelie Lundberg	10 March 1993 (aged 24)	0	0	(Swedish Football Association) Eskilstuna United
22	FW	Olivia Schough	11 March 1991 (aged 26)	55	8	(Swedish Football Association) Eskilstuna United
23	MF	Elin Rubensson	11 May 1993 (aged 24)	43	0	(Swedish Football Association) Kopparbergs/Göteborg

== Group C ==
=== Austria ===
The squad was announced on 1 July 2017.

Head coach: Dominik Thalhammer

No.	Pos.	Player	Date of birth (age)	Caps	Goals	Club
1	GK	Manuela Zinsberger	19 October 1995 (aged 21)	30	0	(German Football Association) Bayern Munich
2	DF	Marina Georgieva	13 April 1997 (aged 20)	1	0	(German Football Association) Turbine Potsdam
3	DF	Katharina Naschenweng	16 December 1997 (aged 19)	7	0	(Austrian Football Association) Sturm Graz
4	FW	Viktoria Pinther	16 October 1998 (aged 18)	6	0	(Austrian Football Association) St. Pölten
5	DF	Sophie Maierhofer	9 August 1996 (aged 20)	17	1	(United States Soccer Federation) Kansas Jayhawks
6	MF	Katharina Schiechtl	27 February 1993 (aged 24)	23	4	(German Football Association) Werder Bremen
7	DF	Carina Wenninger	6 February 1991 (aged 26)	42	2	(German Football Association) Bayern Munich
8	MF	Nadine Prohaska	15 August 1990 (aged 26)	50	6	(Austrian Football Association) St. Pölten
9	FW	Sarah Zadrazil	19 February 1993 (aged 24)	41	6	(German Football Association) Turbine Potsdam
10	FW	Nina Burger	27 December 1987 (aged 29)	54	29	(German Football Association) SC Sand
11	DF	Viktoria Schnaderbeck (c)	4 January 1991 (aged 26)	44	2	(German Football Association) Bayern Munich
12	FW	Stefanie Enzinger	20 November 1989 (aged 27)	7	0	(Austrian Football Association) Sturm Graz
13	DF	Virginia Kirchberger	25 May 1993 (aged 24)	31	1	(German Football Association) MSV Duisburg
14	MF	Barbara Dunst	25 September 1997 (aged 19)	6	0	(German Football Association) MSV Duisburg
15	FW	Nicole Billa	5 March 1996 (aged 21)	30	13	(German Football Association) 1899 Hoffenheim
16	MF	Jasmin Eder	8 October 1992 (aged 24)	30	1	(Austrian Football Association) St. Pölten
17	MF	Sarah Puntigam	13 October 1992 (aged 24)	49	7	(German Football Association) SC Freiburg
18	MF	Laura Feiersinger	5 April 1993 (aged 24)	40	7	(German Football Association) SC Sand
19	DF	Verena Aschauer	20 January 1994 (aged 23)	40	5	(German Football Association) SC Sand
20	FW	Lisa Makas	11 May 1992 (aged 25)	39	11	(German Football Association) MSV Duisburg
21	GK	Jasmin Pfeiler	28 July 1984 (aged 32)	4	0	(Austrian Football Association) Altenmarkt
22	MF	Jennifer Klein	11 January 1999 (aged 18)	0	0	(Austrian Football Association) Neulengbach
23	GK	Carolin Größinger	10 May 1997 (aged 20)	0	0	(Austrian Football Association) Bergheim

=== France ===
The squad was announced on 30 May 2017.

Head coach: Olivier Echouafni

No.	Pos.	Player	Date of birth (age)	Caps	Goals	Club
1	GK	Laëtitia Philippe	30 April 1991 (aged 26)	4	0	(French Football Federation) Montpellier
2	DF	Eve Perisset	24 December 1994 (aged 22)	7	0	(French Football Federation) Paris Saint-Germain
3	DF	Wendie Renard (c)	20 July 1990 (aged 26)	91	19	(French Football Federation) Lyon
4	DF	Laura Georges	20 August 1984 (aged 32)	179	6	(French Football Federation) Paris Saint-Germain
5	MF	Sandie Toletti	13 July 1995 (aged 22)	12	0	(French Football Federation) Montpellier
6	MF	Amandine Henry	28 September 1989 (aged 27)	61	6	(United States Soccer Federation) Portland Thorns
7	FW	Clarisse Le Bihan	14 December 1994 (aged 22)	14	4	(French Football Federation) Montpellier
8	DF	Jessica Houara	29 September 1987 (aged 29)	60	3	(French Football Federation) Lyon
9	FW	Eugénie Le Sommer	18 May 1989 (aged 28)	137	60	(French Football Federation) Lyon
10	MF	Camille Abily	5 December 1984 (aged 32)	179	36	(French Football Federation) Lyon
11	MF	Claire Lavogez	18 June 1994 (aged 23)	33	3	(French Football Federation) Lyon
12	FW	Elodie Thomis	13 August 1986 (aged 30)	139	32	(French Football Federation) Lyon
13	FW	Camille Catala	6 May 1991 (aged 26)	28	3	(French Football Federation) Paris FC
14	DF	Aïssatou Tounkara	16 March 1995 (aged 22)	4	0	(French Football Federation) Paris FC
15	MF	Élise Bussaglia	24 September 1985 (aged 31)	172	28	(Royal Spanish Football Federation) Barcelona
16	GK	Sarah Bouhaddi	17 October 1986 (aged 30)	120	0	(French Football Federation) Lyon
17	MF	Gaëtane Thiney	28 October 1985 (aged 31)	138	55	(French Football Federation) Paris FC
18	FW	Marie-Laure Delie	29 January 1988 (aged 29)	117	65	(French Football Federation) Paris Saint-Germain
19	DF	Griedge Mbock Bathy	26 February 1995 (aged 22)	30	2	(French Football Federation) Lyon
20	FW	Kadidiatou Diani	1 April 1995 (aged 22)	25	2	(French Football Federation) Paris Saint-Germain
21	GK	Méline Gérard	30 May 1990 (aged 27)	11	0	(French Football Federation) Montpellier
22	DF	Sakina Karchaoui	26 January 1996 (aged 21)	11	0	(French Football Federation) Montpellier
23	MF	Grace Geyoro	2 July 1997 (aged 20)	5	0	(French Football Federation) Paris Saint-Germain

=== Iceland ===
The squad was announced on 22 June 2017.

Head coach: Freyr Alexandersson

No.	Pos.	Player	Date of birth (age)	Caps	Goals	Club
1	GK	Guðbjörg Gunnarsdóttir	18 May 1985 (aged 32)	51	0	(Swedish Football Association) Djurgården
2	DF	Sif Atladóttir	15 July 1985 (aged 32)	63	0	(Swedish Football Association) Kristianstad
3	DF	Ingibjörg Sigurðardóttir	7 October 1997 (aged 19)	2	0	(Football Association of Iceland) Breiðablik
4	DF	Glódís Perla Viggósdóttir	27 June 1995 (aged 22)	54	2	(Swedish Football Association) Rosengård
5	MF	Gunnhildur Yrsa Jónsdóttir	28 September 1988 (aged 28)	42	5	(Norwegian Football Federation) Vålerenga
6	FW	Hólmfríður Magnúsdóttir	20 September 1984 (aged 32)	110	37	(Football Association of Iceland) KR Reykjavík
7	MF	Sara Björk Gunnarsdóttir (c)	29 September 1990 (aged 26)	106	18	(German Football Association) VfL Wolfsburg
8	MF	Sigríður Lára Garðarsdóttir	11 March 1994 (aged 23)	8	0	(Football Association of Iceland) ÍBV
9	MF	Katrín Ásbjörnsdóttir	11 December 1992 (aged 24)	13	1	(Football Association of Iceland) Stjarnan
10	MF	Dagný Brynjarsdóttir	10 August 1991 (aged 25)	70	19	(United States Soccer Federation) Portland Thorns
11	DF	Hallbera Guðný Gísladóttir	14 September 1986 (aged 30)	84	3	(Swedish Football Association) Djurgården
12	GK	Sandra Sigurðardóttir	2 October 1986 (aged 30)	16	0	(Football Association of Iceland) Valur
13	GK	Sonný Lára Þráinsdóttir	9 December 1986 (aged 30)	3	0	(Football Association of Iceland) Breiðablik
14	DF	Málfríður Erna Sigurðardóttir	30 May 1984 (aged 33)	33	2	(Football Association of Iceland) Valur
15	FW	Elín Metta Jensen	1 March 1995 (aged 22)	28	5	(Football Association of Iceland) Valur
16	FW	Harpa Þorsteinsdóttir	27 June 1986 (aged 31)	61	18	(Football Association of Iceland) Stjarnan
17	MF	Agla María Albertsdóttir	5 August 1999 (aged 17)	4	0	(Football Association of Iceland) Stjarnan
18	MF	Sandra Jessen	18 January 1995 (aged 22)	18	6	(Football Association of Iceland) Þór/KA
19	DF	Anna Björk Kristjánsdóttir	14 October 1989 (aged 27)	31	0	(Swedish Football Association) Limhamn Bunkeflo
20	FW	Berglind Björg Þorvaldsdóttir	18 January 1992 (aged 25)	27	1	(Football Association of Iceland) Breiðablik
21	DF	Arna Ásgrímsdóttir	12 August 1992 (aged 24)	12	1	(Football Association of Iceland) Valur
22	FW	Rakel Hönnudóttir	30 December 1988 (aged 28)	83	5	(Football Association of Iceland) Breiðablik
23	FW	Fanndís Friðriksdóttir	9 May 1990 (aged 27)	84	10	(Football Association of Iceland) Breiðablik

=== Switzerland ===
The squad was announced on 3 July 2017.

Head coach: (Germany) Martina Voss-Tecklenburg

No.	Pos.	Player	Date of birth (age)	Caps	Goals	Club
1	GK	Gaëlle Thalmann	18 January 1986 (aged 31)	53	0	(Italian Football Federation) Verona
2	DF	Jana Brunner	20 January 1997 (aged 20)	4	0	(Swiss Football Association) Basel
3	FW	Meriame Terchoun	27 October 1995 (aged 21)	9	2	(Swiss Football Association) Basel
4	DF	Rachel Rinast	2 June 1991 (aged 26)	20	1	(German Football Association) Bayer Leverkusen
5	DF	Noelle Maritz	23 December 1995 (aged 21)	48	1	(German Football Association) VfL Wolfsburg
6	DF	Géraldine Reuteler	21 April 1999 (aged 18)	4	2	(Swiss Football Association) Luzern
7	MF	Martina Moser	9 April 1986 (aged 31)	126	20	(Swiss Football Association) Zürich
8	MF	Cinzia Zehnder	4 August 1997 (aged 19)	18	0	(German Football Association) SC Freiburg
9	FW	Ana-Maria Crnogorčević	3 October 1990 (aged 26)	89	47	(German Football Association) 1. FFC Frankfurt
10	FW	Ramona Bachmann	25 December 1990 (aged 26)	80	42	(The Football Association) Chelsea
11	MF	Lara Dickenmann	27 November 1985 (aged 31)	119	46	(German Football Association) VfL Wolfsburg
12	GK	Stenia Michel	23 October 1987 (aged 29)	18	0	(Swiss Football Association) Basel
13	MF	Lia Wälti	19 April 1993 (aged 24)	62	4	(German Football Association) Turbine Potsdam
14	DF	Rahel Kiwic	5 January 1991 (aged 26)	50	8	(German Football Association) Turbine Potsdam
15	DF	Caroline Abbé (c)	13 January 1988 (aged 29)	126	10	(Swiss Football Association) Zürich
16	FW	Fabienne Humm	20 December 1986 (aged 30)	56	21	(Swiss Football Association) Zürich
17	DF	Sandra Betschart	30 March 1989 (aged 28)	67	2	(German Football Association) MSV Duisburg
18	DF	Viola Calligaris	17 March 1996 (aged 21)	6	0	(Royal Spanish Football Federation) Atlético Madrid
19	FW	Eseosa Aigbogun	23 May 1993 (aged 24)	38	3	(German Football Association) Turbine Potsdam
20	MF	Sandrine Mauron	19 December 1996 (aged 20)	7	2	(Swiss Football Association) Zürich
21	GK	Seraina Friedli	20 March 1993 (aged 24)	2	0	(Swiss Football Association) Zürich
22	MF	Vanessa Bernauer	23 March 1988 (aged 29)	65	5	(German Football Association) VfL Wolfsburg
23	MF	Vanessa Bürki	1 April 1986 (aged 31)	78	10	(German Football Association) Bayern Munich

== Group D ==
=== England ===
The squad was announced on 3 April 2017.

Head coach: (Wales) Mark Sampson

No.	Pos.	Player	Date of birth (age)	Caps	Goals	Club
1	GK	Karen Bardsley	14 October 1984 (aged 32)	67	0	(The Football Association) Manchester City
2	DF	Lucy Bronze	28 October 1991 (aged 25)	43	5	(The Football Association) Manchester City
3	DF	Demi Stokes	12 December 1991 (aged 25)	36	1	(The Football Association) Manchester City
4	MF	Jill Scott	2 February 1987 (aged 30)	121	18	(The Football Association) Manchester City
5	DF	Steph Houghton (c)	23 April 1988 (aged 29)	86	9	(The Football Association) Manchester City
6	DF	Jo Potter	13 November 1984 (aged 32)	31	3	(The Football Association) Reading
7	MF	Jordan Nobbs	8 December 1992 (aged 24)	41	5	(The Football Association) Arsenal
8	MF	Izzy Christiansen	20 September 1991 (aged 25)	13	4	(The Football Association) Manchester City
9	FW	Jodie Taylor	17 May 1986 (aged 31)	24	9	(The Football Association) Arsenal
10	MF	Fara Williams	25 January 1984 (aged 33)	162	40	(The Football Association) Arsenal
11	MF	Jade Moore	22 October 1990 (aged 26)	37	1	(The Football Association) Reading
12	DF	Casey Stoney	13 May 1982 (aged 35)	129	6	(The Football Association) Liverpool
13	GK	Siobhan Chamberlain	15 August 1983 (aged 33)	42	0	(The Football Association) Liverpool
14	MF	Karen Carney	1 August 1987 (aged 29)	128	31	(The Football Association) Chelsea
15	DF	Laura Bassett	2 August 1983 (aged 33)	61	2	Unattached
16	MF	Millie Bright	21 August 1993 (aged 23)	9	0	(The Football Association) Chelsea
17	FW	Nikita Parris	10 March 1994 (aged 23)	11	3	(The Football Association) Manchester City
18	FW	Ellen White	9 May 1989 (aged 28)	62	21	(The Football Association) Birmingham City
19	FW	Toni Duggan	25 July 1991 (aged 25)	47	15	(Royal Spanish Football Federation) Barcelona
20	DF	Alex Greenwood	7 September 1993 (aged 23)	23	2	(The Football Association) Liverpool
21	GK	Carly Telford	7 July 1987 (aged 30)	7	0	(The Football Association) Chelsea
22	DF	Alex Scott	14 October 1984 (aged 32)	138	12	(The Football Association) Arsenal
23	FW	Fran Kirby	29 June 1993 (aged 24)	19	6	(The Football Association) Chelsea

=== Portugal ===
The squad was announced on 6 July 2017.

Head coach: Francisco Neto

No.	Pos.	Player	Date of birth (age)	Caps	Goals	Club
1	GK	Jamila Marreiros	30 May 1988 (aged 29)	12	0	(Portuguese Football Federation) Benfica
2	DF	Mónica Mendes	16 June 1993 (aged 24)	35	1	(Swiss Football Association) Neunkirch
3	DF	Raquel Infante	19 September 1990 (aged 26)	13	0	(Royal Spanish Football Federation) Levante
4	DF	Sílvia Rebelo	20 May 1989 (aged 28)	72	1	(Portuguese Football Federation) Braga
5	DF	Matilde Fidalgo	15 May 1994 (aged 23)	33	0	(Portuguese Football Federation) Benfica
6	MF	Andreia Norton	15 August 1996 (aged 20)	3	1	(Portuguese Football Federation) Braga
7	MF	Cláudia Neto (c)	18 April 1988 (aged 29)	106	14	(Swedish Football Association) Linköping
8	FW	Laura Luís	15 August 1992 (aged 24)	38	7	(Portuguese Football Federation) Braga
9	MF	Ana Borges	15 June 1990 (aged 27)	93	9	(Portuguese Football Federation) Sporting CP
10	FW	Ana Leite	23 October 1991 (aged 25)	42	0	(Portuguese Football Federation) Sporting CP
11	MF	Tatiana Pinto	28 March 1994 (aged 23)	25	1	(Portuguese Football Federation) Sporting CP
12	GK	Patrícia Morais	17 June 1992 (aged 25)	43	0	(Portuguese Football Federation) Sporting CP
13	MF	Fátima Pinto	16 January 1996 (aged 21)	27	0	(Portuguese Football Federation) Sporting CP
14	MF	Dolores Silva	7 August 1991 (aged 25)	79	9	(Portuguese Football Federation) Braga
15	DF	Carole Costa	3 May 1990 (aged 27)	83	6	(Portuguese Football Federation) Sporting CP
16	FW	Diana Silva	4 June 1995 (aged 22)	24	1	(Portuguese Football Federation) Sporting CP
17	MF	Vanessa Marques	12 April 1996 (aged 21)	37	2	(Portuguese Football Federation) Braga
18	FW	Carolina Mendes	27 November 1987 (aged 29)	61	9	(Football Association of Iceland) Grindavík
19	MF	Amanda DaCosta	7 October 1989 (aged 27)	18	0	(United States Soccer Federation) Boston Breakers
20	MF	Suzane Pires	17 August 1992 (aged 24)	20	0	(Brazilian Football Confederation) Santos
21	DF	Diana Gomes	26 July 1998 (aged 18)	2	0	(Portuguese Football Federation) Valadares Gaia
22	GK	Rute Costa	1 June 1994 (aged 23)	2	0	(Portuguese Football Federation) Braga
23	MF	Melissa Antunes	8 January 1990 (aged 27)	27	1	(Portuguese Football Federation) Braga

=== Scotland ===
The squad was announced on 27 June 2017.

Head coach: (Sweden) Anna Signeul

No.	Pos.	Player	Date of birth (age)	Caps	Goals	Club
1	GK	Gemma Fay (c)	9 December 1981 (aged 35)	199	0	(Football Association of Iceland) Stjarnan
2	DF	Vaila Barsley	15 September 1987 (aged 29)	3	0	(Swedish Football Association) Eskilstuna United
3	DF	Joelle Murray	7 November 1986 (aged 30)	43	1	(Scottish Football Association) Hibernian
4	DF	Ifeoma Dieke	25 February 1981 (aged 36)	119	0	(Swedish Football Association) Vittsjö
5	MF	Leanne Ross	8 July 1981 (aged 36)	131	9	(Scottish Football Association) Glasgow City
6	MF	Joanne Love	6 December 1985 (aged 31)	177	13	(Scottish Football Association) Glasgow City
7	MF	Hayley Lauder	4 June 1990 (aged 27)	84	9	(Scottish Football Association) Glasgow City
8	MF	Erin Cuthbert	19 July 1998 (aged 18)	8	2	(The Football Association) Chelsea
9	MF	Caroline Weir	20 June 1995 (aged 22)	37	5	(The Football Association) Liverpool
10	MF	Leanne Crichton	6 August 1987 (aged 29)	51	3	(Scottish Football Association) Glasgow City
11	FW	Lisa Evans	21 May 1992 (aged 25)	60	13	(The Football Association) Arsenal
12	GK	Shannon Lynn	22 October 1985 (aged 31)	24	0	(Swedish Football Association) Vittsjö
13	FW	Jane Ross	18 September 1989 (aged 27)	105	49	(The Football Association) Manchester City
14	DF	Rachel Corsie	17 August 1989 (aged 27)	88	16	(United States Soccer Federation) Seattle Reign
15	DF	Sophie Howard	17 September 1993 (aged 23)	2	0	(German Football Association) 1899 Hoffenheim
16	FW	Christie Murray	3 May 1990 (aged 27)	47	3	(The Football Association) Doncaster Rovers Belles
17	DF	Frankie Brown	8 October 1987 (aged 29)	87	0	(The Football Association) Bristol City
18	DF	Rachel McLauchlan	7 July 1997 (aged 20)	3	0	(Scottish Football Association) Hibernian
19	MF	Lana Clelland	26 January 1993 (aged 24)	14	1	(Italian Football Federation) Tavagnacco
20	DF	Kirsty Smith	6 January 1994 (aged 23)	23	0	(Scottish Football Association) Hibernian
21	GK	Lee Alexander	23 September 1991 (aged 25)	0	0	(Scottish Football Association) Glasgow City
22	FW	Fiona Brown	31 March 1995 (aged 22)	18	0	(Swedish Football Association) Eskilstuna United
23	DF	Chloe Arthur	21 January 1995 (aged 22)	7	0	(The Football Association) Bristol City

=== Spain ===
The squad was announced on 20 June 2017.

Head coach: Jorge Vilda

No.	Pos.	Player	Date of birth (age)	Caps	Goals	Club
1	GK	Dolores Gallardo	10 June 1993 (aged 24)	17	0	(Royal Spanish Football Federation) Atlético Madrid
2	DF	Celia Jiménez	20 June 1995 (aged 22)	10	0	(United States Soccer Federation) Alabama Crimson Tide
3	DF	Marta Torrejón (c)	27 February 1990 (aged 27)	73	9	(Royal Spanish Football Federation) Barcelona
4	DF	Irene Paredes	4 July 1991 (aged 26)	41	3	(French Football Federation) Paris Saint-Germain
5	DF	Andrea Pereira	19 September 1993 (aged 23)	9	0	(Royal Spanish Football Federation) Atlético Madrid
6	MF	Virginia Torrecilla	4 September 1994 (aged 22)	33	4	(French Football Federation) Montpellier
7	MF	Marta Corredera	8 August 1991 (aged 25)	43	3	(Royal Spanish Football Federation) Atlético Madrid
8	MF	Amanda Sampedro	26 June 1993 (aged 24)	24	7	(Royal Spanish Football Federation) Atlético Madrid
9	FW	Mari Paz Vilas	1 February 1988 (aged 29)	15	13	(Royal Spanish Football Federation) Valencia
10	FW	Jennifer Hermoso	9 May 1990 (aged 27)	43	18	(French Football Federation) Paris Saint-Germain
11	MF	Alexia Putellas	4 February 1994 (aged 23)	42	8	(Royal Spanish Football Federation) Barcelona
12	GK	María Asunción Quiñones	29 October 1996 (aged 20)	1	0	(Royal Spanish Football Federation) Real Sociedad
13	GK	Sandra Paños	4 November 1992 (aged 24)	15	0	(Royal Spanish Football Federation) Barcelona
14	MF	Victoria Losada	5 March 1991 (aged 26)	44	12	(Royal Spanish Football Federation) Barcelona
15	MF	Silvia Meseguer	12 March 1989 (aged 28)	52	5	(Royal Spanish Football Federation) Atlético Madrid
16	DF	Alexandra López	26 February 1989 (aged 28)	14	0	(Royal Spanish Football Federation) Atlético Madrid
17	FW	Olga García	1 June 1992 (aged 25)	15	3	(Royal Spanish Football Federation) Barcelona
18	FW	Esther González	8 December 1992 (aged 24)	2	0	(Royal Spanish Football Federation) Atlético Madrid
19	FW	Bárbara Latorre	14 March 1993 (aged 24)	7	0	(Royal Spanish Football Federation) Barcelona
20	DF	María Pilar León	13 June 1995 (aged 22)	7	0	(Royal Spanish Football Federation) Atlético Madrid
21	DF	Leila Ouahabi	22 March 1993 (aged 24)	14	1	(Royal Spanish Football Federation) Barcelona
22	FW	Mariona Caldentey	19 March 1996 (aged 21)	6	1	(Royal Spanish Football Federation) Barcelona
23	DF	Paula Nicart	8 September 1994 (aged 22)	2	0	(Royal Spanish Football Federation) Valencia

== Statistics ==
=== Player representation by league system ===
Country	Players	Outside national squad
Germany	59	39
England	42	21
France	37	16
Sweden	35	21
Spain	25	6
Italy	24	2
Russia	23	0
Norway	17	2
Iceland	17	2
Portugal	17	0
Netherlands	14	4
Belgium	12	0
Switzerland	10	1
Denmark	9	0
United States	9	–
Austria	8	0
Scotland	8	0
Brazil	1	–

Note: One player is unattached.
