= UEFA Women's Euro 2017 Group B =

Football tournament group stage

Group B of UEFA Women's Euro 2017 contained Germany, Italy, Russia and Sweden. The matches were played from 17 to 25 July 2017.

== Teams ==
Draw position	Team	Method of qualification	Date of qualification	Finals appearance	Last appearance	Previous best performance	UEFA ranking for final draw	FIFA ranking at start of event
B1	Germany	Group 5 winners	12 April 2016	10th	2013	Champions (1989, 1991, 1995, 1997, 2001, 2005, 2009, 2013)	1	2
B2	Sweden	Group 4 winners	15 September 2016	10th	2013	Champions (1984)	5	9
B3	Russia	Group 6 runners-up	20 September 2016	11th	2013	Runners-up (1993, 1997)	8	18
B4	Italy	Group 5 runners-up	20 September 2016	5th	2013	Quarter-finals (1993, 1995)	15	25

== Standings ==
Pos	Team	Pld	W	D	L	GF	GA	GD	Pts	Qualification
1	Germany	3	2	1	0	4	1	+3	7	Knockout stage
2	Sweden	3	1	1	1	4	3	+1	4	Knockout stage
3	Russia	3	1	0	2	2	5	−3	3	
4	Italy	3	1	0	2	5	6	−1	3	

Source: UEFA
Rules for classification: Group stage tiebreakers

In the quarter-finals:

- The winners of Group B, Germany, advance to play the runners-up of Group A, Denmark.
- The runners-up of Group B, Sweden, advance to play the winners of Group A, Netherlands.

== Matches ==
All times are local (UTC+2).

=== Italy vs Russia ===
17 July 2017
18:00

Italy	1–2	Russia
Mauro 88'	Report	Danilova 9'; E. Morozova 26'

Sparta Stadion Het Kasteel, Rotterdam
Attendance: 669
Referee: Jana Adámková (Czech Republic)

Italy	Russia

GK	12	Chiara Marchitelli
RB	3	Sara Gama		(substituted off) 27'
CB	2	Cecilia Salvai
CB	5	Elena Linari	(yellow card) 69'
LB	13	Elisa Bartoli	(yellow card) 89'
RM	7	Alia Guagni		(substituted off) 71'
CM	4	Daniela Stracchi
CM	16	Manuela Giugliano
LM	21	Marta Carissimi		(substituted off) 61'
CF	9	Ilaria Mauro
CF	8	Melania Gabbiadini (c)
Substitutions:
DF	14	Linda Tucceri		(substituted in) 27'
FW	23	Cristiana Girelli		(substituted in) 61'
MF	11	Barbara Bonansea		(substituted in) 71'
Manager:
Antonio Cabrini

GK	1	Tatyana Shcherbak	(yellow card) 61'
RB	18	Elvira Ziyastinova
CB	8	Daria Makarenko
CB	3	Anna Kozhnikova (c)
LB	2	Natalya Solodkaya
DM	23	Elena Morozova
RM	11	Ekaterina Sochneva		(substituted off) 90'
CM	10	Nadezhda Smirnova
CM	9	Anna Cholovyaga		(substituted off) 59'
LM	20	Margarita Chernomyrdina
CF	15	Elena Danilova		(substituted off) 75'
Substitutions:
FW	17	Ekaterina Pantyukhina		(substituted in) 59'
FW	6	Nadezhda Karpova		(substituted in) 75'
FW	22	Marina Kiskonen		(substituted in) 90'
Manager:
Elena Fomina

Player of the Match:
Elena Morozova (Russia)

Assistant referees:
Maria Lisická (Slovakia)
Lucie Ratajová (Czech Republic)
Fourth official:
Riem Hussein (Germany)

=== Germany vs Sweden ===
17 July 2017
20:45

Germany	0–0	Sweden
	Report

Rat Verlegh Stadion, Breda
Attendance: 9,276
Referee: Katalin Kulcsár (Hungary)

Germany	Sweden

GK	1	Almuth Schult
RB	14	Anna Blässe		(substituted off) 73'
CB	5	Babett Peter
CB	2	Josephine Henning
LB	7	Carolin Simon
DM	6	Kristin Demann
RW	20	Lina Magull	(yellow card) 75'
AM	10	Dzsenifer Marozsán (c)
LW	13	Sara Däbritz
CF	11	Anja Mittag		(substituted off) 65'
CF	19	Svenja Huth		(substituted off) 39'
Substitutions:
FW	9	Mandy Islacker		(substituted in) 39'
FW	23	Hasret Kayikçi		(substituted in) 65'
DF	4	Leonie Maier		(substituted in) 73'
Manager:
Steffi Jones

GK	1	Hedvig Lindahl
RB	15	Jessica Samuelsson
CB	5	Nilla Fischer
CB	3	Linda Sembrant
LB	2	Jonna Andersson	(substituted off) 87'
RM	9	Kosovare Asllani
CM	7	Lisa Dahlkvist
CM	17	Caroline Seger (c)
LM	22	Olivia Schough	(substituted off) 55'
CF	18	Fridolina Rolfö	(substituted off) 56'
CF	8	Lotta Schelin
Substitutions:
MF	23	Elin Rubensson	(substituted in) 55'
FW	11	Stina Blackstenius	(substituted in) 56'
FW	6	Magdalena Eriksson	(substituted in) 87'
Manager:
Pia Sundhage

Player of the Match:
Dzsenifer Marozsán (Germany)

Assistant referees:
Judit Kulcsár (Hungary)
Nicolet Bakker (Netherlands)
Fourth official:
Lina Lehtovaara (Finland)

=== Sweden vs Russia ===
21 July 2017
18:00

Sweden	2–0	Russia
Schelin 22'; Blackstenius 51'	Report

De Adelaarshorst, Deventer
Attendance: 5,764
Referee: Stéphanie Frappart (France)

Sweden	Russia

GK	1	Hedvig Lindahl
RB	15	Jessica Samuelsson
CB	5	Nilla Fischer
CB	3	Linda Sembrant
LB	6	Magdalena Eriksson	(yellow card) 17'
RM	9	Kosovare Asllani
CM	17	Caroline Seger
CM	7	Lisa Dahlkvist		(substituted off) 63'
LM	22	Olivia Schough		(substituted off) 46'
CF	11	Stina Blackstenius		(substituted off) 73'
CF	8	Lotta Schelin (c)
Substitutions:
FW	18	Fridolina Rolfö		(substituted in) 46'
MF	14	Hanna Folkesson		(substituted in) 63'
FW	19	Pauline Hammarlund		(substituted in) 73'
Manager:
Pia Sundhage

GK	1	Tatyana Shcherbak
RB	18	Elvira Ziyastinova
CB	8	Daria Makarenko
CB	3	Anna Kozhnikova (c)
LB	2	Natalya Solodkaya
DM	23	Elena Morozova	(yellow card) 55'
RM	11	Ekaterina Sochneva	(yellow card) 21'	(substituted off) 81'
CM	10	Nadezhda Smirnova
CM	9	Anna Cholovyaga
LM	20	Margarita Chernomyrdina		(substituted off) 66'
CF	15	Elena Danilova		(substituted off) 72'
Substitutions:
FW	16	Marina Fedorova		(substituted in) 66'
FW	6	Nadezhda Karpova		(substituted in) 72'
FW	22	Marina Kiskonen		(substituted in) 81'
Manager:
Elena Fomina

Player of the Match:
Lotta Schelin (Sweden)

Assistant referees:
Manuela Nicolosi (France)
Angela Kyriakou (Cyprus)
Fourth official:
Lorraine Clark (Scotland)

=== Germany vs Italy ===
21 July 2017
20:45

Germany	2–1	Italy
Henning 19'; Peter 67' (pen.)	Report	Mauro 29'

Koning Willem II Stadion, Tilburg
Attendance: 7,108
Referee: Kateryna Monzul (Ukraine)

Germany	Italy

GK	1	Almuth Schult
RB	4	Leonie Maier	(yellow card) 81'
CB	5	Babett Peter
CB	2	Josephine Henning	(yellow card) 39'	(substituted off) 46'
LB	17	Isabel Kerschowski
DM	6	Kristin Demann
RM	16	Linda Dallmann		(substituted off) 88'
LM	13	Sara Däbritz
AM	10	Dzsenifer Marozsán (c)
CF	11	Anja Mittag	(yellow card) 85'
CF	9	Mandy Islacker		(substituted off) 79'
Substitutions:
DF	3	Kathrin-Julia Hendrich		(substituted in) 46'
FW	18	Lena Petermann		(substituted in) 79'
FW	20	Lina Magull		(substituted in) 88'
Manager:
Steffi Jones

GK	1	Laura Giuliani
RB	7	Alia Guagni
CB	5	Elena Linari
CB	2	Cecilia Salvai
LB	13	Elisa Bartoli	(yellow card) 64' (yellow-red card) 69'
RM	21	Marta Carissimi	(yellow card) 53'
CM	4	Daniela Stracchi	(yellow card) 66'
CM	20	Valentina Cernoia		(substituted off) 73'
RM	11	Barbara Bonansea
CF	9	Ilaria Mauro		(substituted off) 45+2'
CF	8	Melania Gabbiadini (c)		(substituted off) 84'
Substitutions:
FW	23	Cristiana Girelli		(substituted in) 45+2'
DF	14	Linda Tucceri Cimini		(substituted in) 73'
FW	18	Daniela Sabatino		(substituted in) 84'
Manager:
Antonio Cabrini

Player of the Match:
Linda Dallmann (Germany)

Assistant referees:
Maryna Striletska (Ukraine)
Oleksandra Ardasheva (Ukraine)
Fourth official:
Lina Lehtovaara (Finland)

=== Russia vs Germany ===
25 July 2017
20:45

Russia	0–2	Germany
	Report	Peter 10' (pen.); Marozsán 56' (pen.)

Stadion Galgenwaard, Utrecht
Attendance: 6,458
Referee: Monika Mularczyk (Poland)

Russia	Germany

GK	1	Tatyana Shcherbak
RB	18	Elvira Ziyastinova
CB	8	Daria Makarenko		(substituted off) 28'
CB	3	Anna Kozhnikova (c)	(yellow card) 43'
LB	2	Natalya Solodkaya
DM	23	Elena Morozova
RM	11	Ekaterina Sochneva
CM	10	Nadezhda Smirnova		(substituted off) 46'
CM	9	Anna Cholovyaga
LM	20	Margarita Chernomyrdina		(substituted off) 63'
CF	15	Elena Danilova
Substitutions:
MF	19	Ekaterina Morozova		(substituted in) 28'
FW	16	Marina Fedorova		(substituted in) 46'
FW	6	Nadezhda Karpova		(substituted in) 63'
Manager:
Elena Fomina

GK	1	Almuth Schult
RB	14	Anna Blässe
CB	8	Lena Goeßling
CB	5	Babett Peter
LB	7	Carolin Simon
DM	6	Kristin Demann
CM	15	Sara Doorsoun
CM	13	Sara Däbritz	(substituted off) 68'
AM	10	Dzsenifer Marozsán (c)
CF	11	Anja Mittag	(substituted off) 75'
CF	9	Mandy Islacker	(substituted off) 46'
Substitutions:
FW	23	Hasret Kayikçi	(substituted in) 46'
MF	20	Lina Magull	(substituted in) 68'
MF	22	Tabea Kemme	(substituted in) 75'
Manager:
Steffi Jones

Player of the Match:
Babett Peter (Germany)

Assistant referees:
Anna Dabrowska (Poland)
Michelle O'Neill (Ireland)
Fourth official:
Lorraine Clark (Scotland)

=== Sweden vs Italy ===
25 July 2017
20:45

Sweden	2–3	Italy
Schelin 14' (pen.); Blackstenius 47'	Report	Sabatino 4', 37'; Girelli 85'

De Vijverberg, Doetinchem
Attendance: 5,203
Referee: Esther Staubli (Switzerland)

Sweden	Italy

GK	1	Hedvig Lindahl
RB	23	Elin Rubensson
CB	3	Linda Sembrant
CB	6	Magdalena Eriksson
LB	2	Jonna Andersson
RM	9	Kosovare Asllani	(substituted off) 46'
CM	14	Hanna Folkesson
CM	17	Caroline Seger (c)	(substituted off) 46'
LM	22	Olivia Schough	(substituted off) 79'
CF	11	Stina Blackstenius
CF	8	Lotta Schelin
Substitutions:
FW	18	Fridolina Rolfö	(substituted in) 46'
MF	7	Lisa Dahlkvist	(substituted in) 46'
MF	10	Julia Spetsmark	(substituted in) 79'
Manager:
Pia Sundhage

GK	1	Laura Giuliani
RB	7	Alia Guagni
CB	5	Elena Linari
CB	17	Federica Di Criscio	(yellow card) 13'
LB	14	Linda Tucceri	(yellow card) 26'	(substituted off) 60'
CM	19	Aurora Galli
CM	4	Daniela Stracchi
CM	10	Martina Rosucci		(substituted off) 83'
RF	8	Melania Gabbiadini (c)
CF	18	Daniela Sabatino		(substituted off) 77'
LF	11	Barbara Bonansea
Substitutions:
MF	16	Manuela Giugliano		(substituted in) 60'
FW	23	Cristiana Girelli		(substituted in) 77'
MF	21	Marta Carissimi		(substituted in) 83'
Manager:
Antonio Cabrini

Player of the Match:
Daniela Stracchi (Italy)

Assistant referees:
Belinda Brem (Switzerland)
Sanja Rodjak Karšić (Croatia)
Fourth official:
Lina Lehtovaara (Finland)
