= Germany at the UEFA Women's Championship =

Germany have participated 13 times at the UEFA Women's Championship: They have won eight UEFA Women's Championships (1989, 1991, 1995, 1997, 2001, 2005, 2009, 2013).

== Euro 1984 ==
At the first European Championships, the team coached by Gero Bisanz failed in qualifying. With five draws and a defeat against the group winner Denmark, the DFB selection finished only third place in the group.

== Euro 1987 ==
Gero Bisanz had gradually rejuvenated the team and had quite chances to qualify for the first played finals. A defeat in Finland and a goalless draw in Norway brought the West German team a better ranking. In the final ranking, West Germany took third place again.

== Euro 1989 ==
Unbeaten and conceded the West German team survived the qualification as a group winner. In the quarter-finals, it was against the CSSR to qualify for the finals. This succeeded after a 1–1 draw away and a 2–0 home game. The DFB applied for a successful qualification for the finals and was awarded the contract. The tournament was the breakthrough for West German women's football, which until then was still ridiculed and vilified. In the semi-finals, the West German team met in victory he Leimbachstadion on Italy. After extra time, it was 1: 1, so that followed a penalty shootout. Here goalkeeper Marion Isbert became a heroine when she first parried a penalty and then transformed herself. For the first time, a women's football match was broadcast live on West German television.

On 2 July 1989, the Bisanz team met Norway in the final. The venue was the Stadium at the Bremen Bridge in Osnabrück. Although Norway went into the match as a favorite, but the West German team could inspire the audience with a furious 4: 1 victory. West Germany was European champion for the only time.

== Euro 1993 ==
To qualify for the quarter-finals, the DFB selection had to play only one game. Because of civil war it in Yugoslavia, the team's home game was relocated from the Balkans to Sofia, which the German team won 3–0. Yugoslavia relinquished the second leg and the Bisanz-Elf continued without a fight. In the quarter-finals the opponent was called Russia. In Moscow Germany won 7–0 and thus made the qualification perfect. The 0: 0 in the return match in Rheine had only statistical value.

As successful as the qualification went, the result was disappointing at the European Championship which took place in Italy. As in 1989 and 1991, the semi-final opponent was Italy. This time the German Elf was without Fortune. In the 100th minute, Jutta Nardenbach received the Red Card and on Penalties the hosts prevailed.

== Euro 1995 ==
Already in qualifying the DFB-Elf could set a new record. All six games were won and they were even without a clean sheet. The Wales were overwhelmed twice with 12: 0 and against the Swiss there was a 11: 0.

The European Championship in 1995 was the last time there was no finals. The quarter-finals and semi-finals were played in the home and away matches. In the quarterfinals there were two wins against Russia, in the semi-final two wins against England. The final against Sweden took place in Fritz-Walter-Stadion in Kaiserslautern. In a thrilling match the Bisanz-Elf kept the upper hand 3: 2 and celebrated for the third time the European Championship. It was the last European Championship for Gero Bisanz. Thus, the German team played in the small final against Denmark. The Danes won this match 3: 1 To date, the fourth place at the 1993 European Championships is the worst placement of a German team.

== Euro 1997 ==
For the first time, Tina Theune-Meyer led the German national team through the European Championship qualification. The direct qualification was missed. Although there were significant wins against Finland and the Slovakia, a draw and defeat to world champions Norway missed their group victory. As a runner-up, the DFB-Elf had to relegate against Iceland. There were two clear victories and the tickets for the finals in Norway and Sweden could be booked.

With a lot of effort, the German team reached the semi-finals. After two draws against Italy and Norway handed a 2: 0 against Denmark in the last group match for progress. By a 1–0 semi-final victory against Sweden, the German selection reached the final in Oslo. Again the opponent was called Italy. With goals from Sandra Minnert and Birgit Prinz the German team won 2–0 and the fourth European Championship was sealed. Germany was in the final with the hitherto youngest team, which was on average 23.33 years old on the final day.

== Euro 2001 ==
Except for a 4: 4 draw in Italy, the German national team scored five clear wins. After the successful qualification, the DFB applied for the hosting of the European Championship 2001 and was awarded the contract. It was the last European Championship so far, in which the organizer was not determined in advance.

In the preliminary round, the DFB-Elf showed three convincing games and was able to beat Sweden, Russia and England clear. In the semi-finals it was against the old rival from Norway. It developed an exciting game, which was decided by a worth seeing header by Sandra Smisek. On 7 July 2001, in Ulm he faced Donaustadion the German and the Swedish Elf. In pouring rain, no goals were scored in regular time. Punctually at the beginning of the extension, the rain stopped. After a pass from Maren Meinert Claudia Müller scored Golden goal and the European Championship number five was perfect.

== Euro 2005 ==
As the reigning world champion, the DFB team was a favorite in qualifying for the European Championships in England. The eight qualifiers were all won and in the end there was a goal difference of 50: 2. The first appearance after the World Cup brought with the 13–0 victory against Portugal the highest ever victory in national team history. The second leg in Portugal was won double-digit 11: 0. Inka Grings scored five goals in this game alone, while goalkeeper Silke Rottenberg remained almost unemployed. With 14 goals, Birgit Prinz, who had scored at least one goal in all games except the 3–1 in Ukraine, was the top scorer of the qualifier.

The start into the European Championship was bumpy. At the beginning there was a tedious 1–0 against Norway. Against Italy (4: 0) and France (3: 0) it was better. Finland was surprisingly the semi-final opponent. With a clear 4: 1, the final move could be ensured. As four years earlier, the German selection met again in the final on the upbeat opponents. Again, the Germans retained the upper hand and came to a 3–1 victory. After the sixth European Championship, the fourth in a row, Tina Theune-Meyer resigned and handed over the coaching office to her assistant Silvia Neid.

== Euro 2009 ==
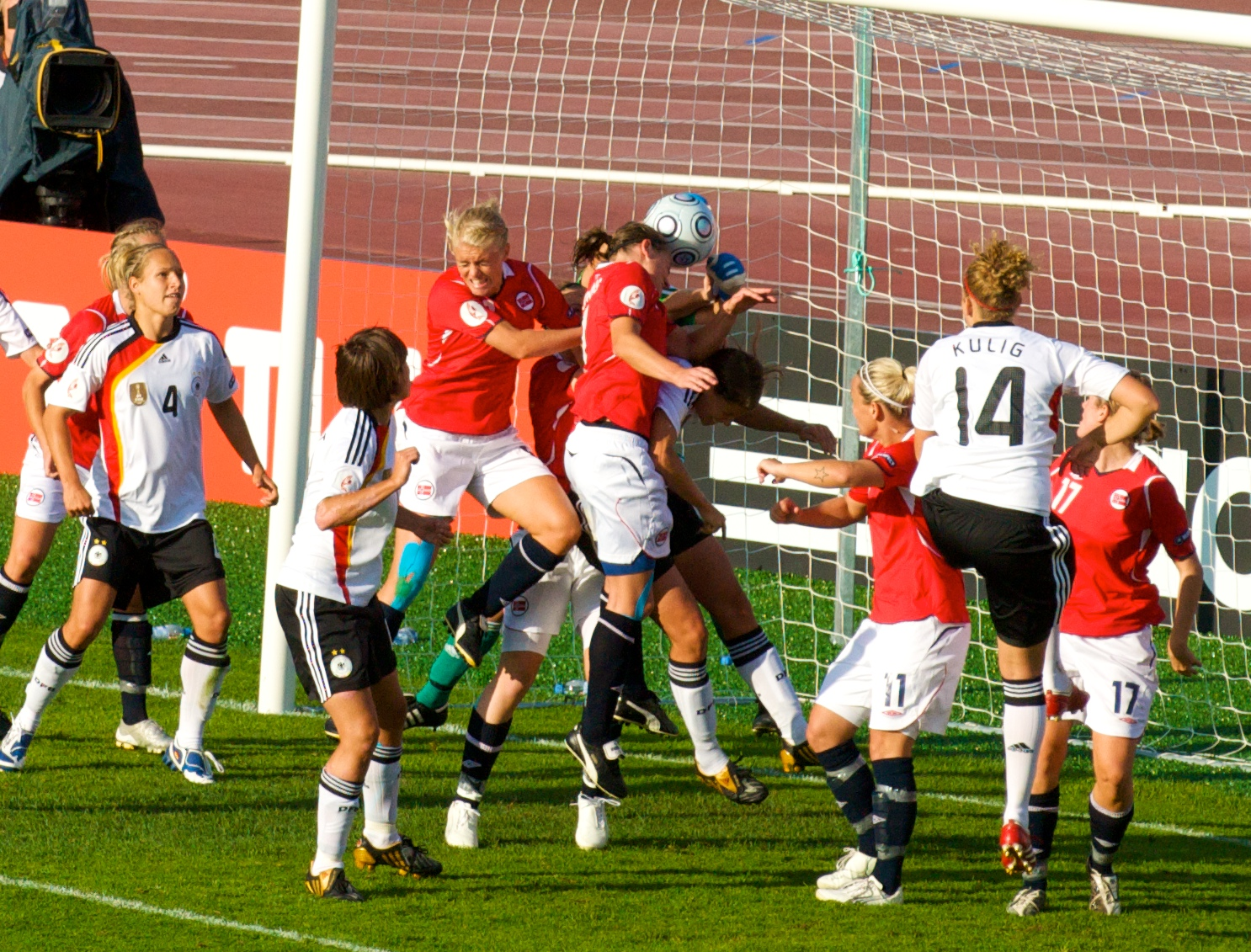
Germany – Norway

The Euro 2009 took place in Finland. For the first time twelve teams participated in the tournament. Germany met in qualifying on Belgium, Netherlands, Switzerland and Wales and qualified without a point loss with a goal difference of 34: 1. The group draw held on 18 November 2008 awarded Germany the vice-European champions Norway as well as the France and Iceland. In the first group game you met already on the old rival Norway. The German team managed a quick lead through a penalty converted by Linda Bresonik, after which the team missed many good chances and had almost conceded the equalizer in injury time, but Nadine Angerer fended off the placed shot. In return, as well as the additional injury time still 3 goals could be achieved. After also the second group match against France was won 5–1 and due to the other group match Germany after two games was already determined as a group winner, the national coach in the third group game sparing some regular players who were also "endangered yellow". So the team did themselves against the already eliminated Icelandic long-hard and could only achieve in the 50th minute by the half-time substitute Inga Grings the 1: 0 winner. Grings injured his knee and had to be replaced again a few minutes later. Through targeted medical treatments, she could be made fit for the knockout games again. So they could play in the quarter-final against Italy again and scored in the 4th and 47th minute, the decisive goals for a 2–1 victory. In the semi-finals, they again met Norway, who had reached the quarter-finals only as one of the two best group stages and had surprisingly won 3–1 against the favored Swedes. Compared to the first game, the Norwegians were unrecognizable and could go in the 10th minute after a corner in which several Norwegians the German goalkeeper locked 1–0 in the lead. A short time later they hit – again after a corner – only the post and the German team did a long time hard. Only in the 2nd half three substitute players could turn the game and prepare the way to the final. This developed into the top scoring final in European history, in which the English women held long, but by the 4: 2, the fifth tournament goal of Inga Grings was the spell broken. In the end, the victory was very clear with 6: 2.

== Euro 2013 ==
The UEFA Women's Euro 2013 was held for the second time in Sweden. Germany met in qualifying on Spain, the Switzerland and the Turkey and for the first time on Kazakhstan and Romania. The qualification began on 17 September 2011 with the game against Switzerland and ended on 19 September 2012 with the game against Turkey. Against Switzerland there were previously 14 games, of which 13 were won and one draw ended (goal difference 67: 2). Only once have German football women played against Spain and Turkey. Both games were won clearly with 6: 0 and 12: 1 respectively. For the Turkish women this is the highest international defeat so far. Only the Spaniards could qualify once before for a European Championship, where they reached the semi-finals in 1997. In the four games played in 2011, the German team came to three victories, including a 17–0 record victory over Kazakhstan; added a 2: 2 in Spain. As Spain lost on 16 June 2012 against Switzerland, the participation of the German team was determined by the direct comparison before the last two games. The last games were won and with a goal difference of 64: 3 the German team finished the qualification. No other team gets more than 35 goals. With 17 goals, Célia Okoyino da Mbabi was the top scorer in qualifying.

In the final round, the German team started with a 0–0 against the Netherlands, with the Dutch women had better chances to score. The subsequent game against Iceland was won 3–0 and due to the results of the other groups Germany was already qualified for the quarter-finals. In the final match against Norway, which was only about the group victory, the German team lost for the first time a European Championship final round match against Norway and after more than 20 years ever again a European Championship final round match. In the quarter-finals, the team met as in 2009 on Italy and was able to prevail thanks to a performance increase with 1: 0. In the semi-finals, the tournament's youngest team met host Sweden, who competed with the oldest squad of all participants and was favored after their previous games. By the hitherto best tournament performance, however, the German team was able to prevail against Sweden as in all previous K. o.-games and reach the final by a 1–0 for the sixth time in a row where they met for the fourth time on Norway. The German team won the title for the eighth time with the third 1–0 victory in this European Championship, in which Nadine Angerer could hold two penalties by the Norwegians. The winner scored the second-half substitute Anja Mittag with her first ball contact.

== Euro 2017 ==
The 2017 European Championship took place in the Netherlands. Germany met in qualifying Croatia, Russia, Turkey and Hungary, The games took place between 14 September 2015 and 20 September 2016. Against all Germany has a positive balance and only one game (1985 against Hungary) lost. Germany started their qualifying campaign with a 12–0 draw against Hungary, with Tabea Kemme and Pauline Bremer scoring their first international goals and the latter three goals top scorer. Although fewer goals were scored in the following games, the next three games were also conceded without conceding. Although national coach Neid had to renounce some injured regular players, the newly nominated players, especially those only 27 considered for the first time Mandy Islacker justified by the first goals in two games each of their nominations. After also the other games were won without conceding, was after six games when the Russians in their home game against Hungary only came to a 3: 3, already after six games the qualification. Also the remaining games after the Olympic victory, after Steffi Jones took over the post as national coach, were won. In addition, the German team remained clean sheet.

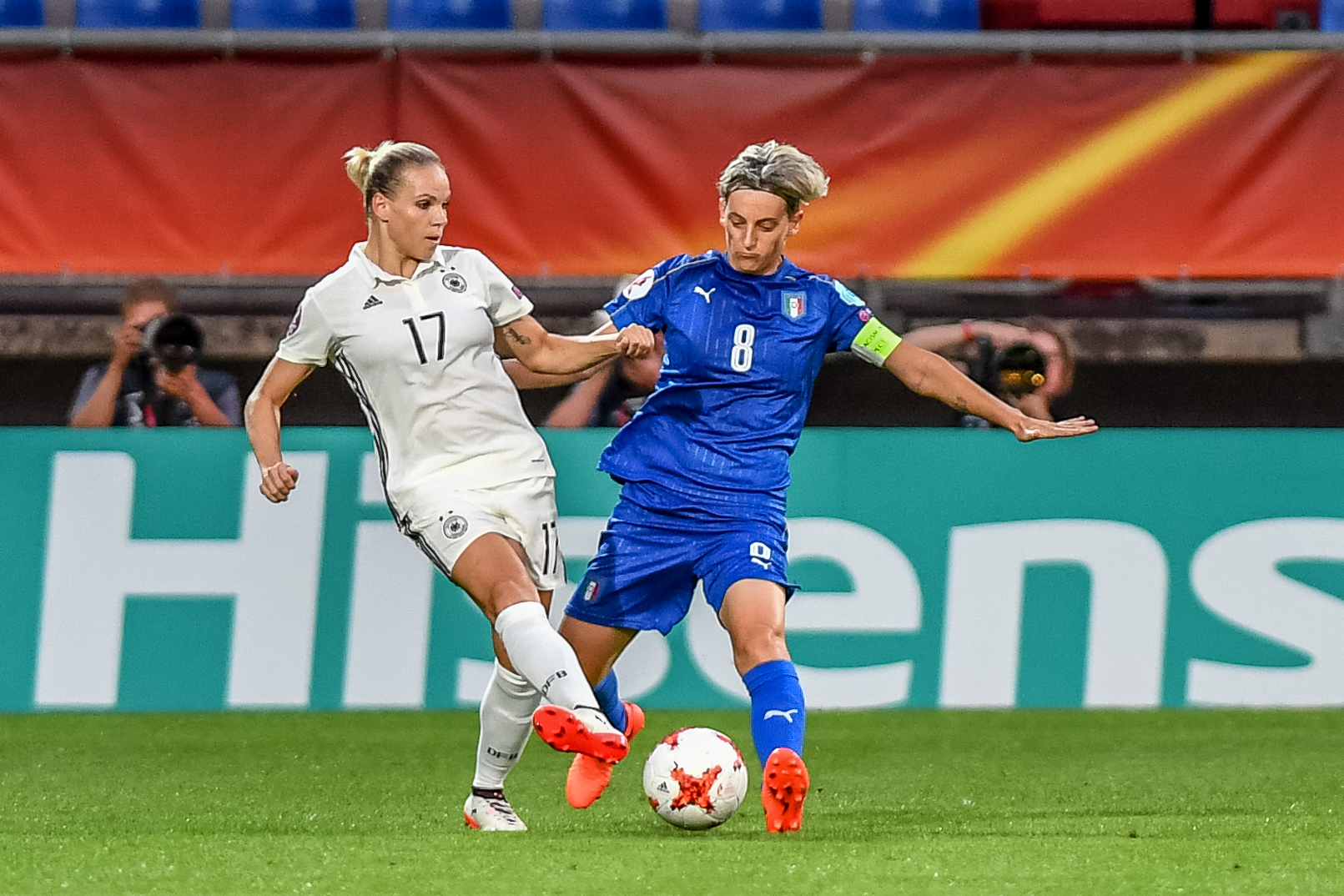
Scene from the match against Italy with Isabel Kerschowski and the Italian captain Melania Gabbiadini

For the draw of the final round groups on 8 November 2016, Germany was assigned pot 1 together with the host Netherlands, England and France and allocated to group B as group head. Opponents were Sweden, Italy and Russia, making it the only group without a freshman and neighborhood duel. Germany started with a goalless draw against Sweden, which made it the first time in the encounter with the Scandinavians no winner. It was won against Italy and Russia, but the goals were scored by defender Marozsán and captain. As a group winner, the German team then met in the quarterfinals on Denmark. However, the game could not take place on the scheduled date, because the place was unplayable due to continuous rain. One day later, both arrived at the unusual lunchtime for them. The German team seemed to be more alert at first, taking the lead in the third minute with an Isabel Kerschowski long shot from the Danish goalkeeper. The leadership paralyzed but rather the German team rather than give her safety and as a result increased not only the Danish goalkeeper, but their entire team, so that Germany came to no significant scoring chances. Shortly after the half-time break, they were able to equalize first and finally turn the game in the 83rd minute. As the German players then no longer managed to score chances, Germany dropped out of the quarter-finals for the first time in a European Championship finals. Shortly after the European Championship, striker Anja Mittag announced her retirement from the national team.

=== Group B ===
Pos	Team	Pld	W	D	L	GF	GA	GD	Pts	Qualification
1	Germany	3	2	1	0	4	1	+3	7	Knockout stage
2	Sweden	3	1	1	1	4	3	+1	4	Knockout stage
3	Russia	3	1	0	2	2	5	−3	3	
4	Italy	3	1	0	2	5	6	−1	3	

Source: UEFA
Rules for classification: Group stage tiebreakers
17 July 2017
20:45

Germany	0–0	Sweden
	Report

Rat Verlegh Stadion, Breda
Attendance: 9,276
Referee: Katalin Kulcsár (Hungary)

21 July 2017
20:45

Germany	2–1	Italy
Henning 19'; Peter 67' (pen.)	Report	Mauro 29'

Koning Willem II Stadion, Tilburg
Attendance: 7,108
Referee: Kateryna Monzul (Ukraine)

25 July 2017
20:45

Russia	0–2	Germany
	Report	Peter 10' (pen.); Marozsán 56' (pen.)

Stadion Galgenwaard, Utrecht
Attendance: 6,458
Referee: Monika Mularczyk (Poland)

=== Quarter-finals ===
30 July 2017 (Note: The Germany v Denmark match, originally scheduled on 29 July 2017, 20:45 CEST, was postponed to the following day due to adverse weather conditions.)
12:00

Germany	1–2	Denmark
Kerschowski 3'	Report	Nadim 49'; T. Nielsen 83'

Sparta Stadion Het Kasteel, Rotterdam
Attendance: 5,251
Referee: Katalin Kulcsár (Hungary)

== Euro 2022 ==
=== Group B ===
Pos	Team	Pld	W	D	L	GF	GA	GD	Pts	Qualification
1	Germany	3	3	0	0	9	0	+9	9	Advance to knockout stage
2	Spain	3	2	0	1	5	3	+2	6	Advance to knockout stage
3	Denmark	3	1	0	2	1	5	−4	3	
4	Finland	3	0	0	3	1	8	−7	0	

Source: UEFA
8 July 2022
20:00

Germany	4–0	Denmark
Magull 21'; Schüller 57'; Lattwein 78'; Popp 86'	Report

Brentford Community Stadium, London
Attendance: 15,736
Referee: Esther Staubli (Switzerland)

12 July 2022
20:00

Germany	2–0	Spain
Bühl 3'; Popp 37'	Report

Brentford Community Stadium, London
Attendance: 16,037
Referee: Stéphanie Frappart (France)

16 July 2022
20:00

Finland	0–3	Germany
	Report	Kleinherne 40'; Popp 48'; Anyomi 63'

Stadium MK, Milton Keynes
Attendance: 20,721
Referee: Emikar Calderas (Venezuela)

=== Quarter-finals ===
21 July 2022
20:00

Germany	2–0	Austria
Magull 25'; Popp 90'	Report

Brentford Community Stadium, London
Attendance: 16,025
Referee: Rebecca Welch (England)

=== Semi-finals ===
27 July 2022
20:00

Germany	2–1	France
Popp 40', 76'	Report	Frohms 44' (o.g.)

Stadium MK, Milton Keynes
Attendance: 27,445
Referee: Cheryl Foster (Wales)

=== Final ===
31 July 2022
17:00

England	2–1 (a.e.t.)	Germany
Toone 62'; Kelly 110'	Report	Magull 79'

Wembley Stadium, London
Attendance: 87,192
Referee: Kateryna Monzul (Ukraine)

== Euro 2025 ==
=== Group C ===
Pos	Team	Pld	W	D	L	GF	GA	GD	Pts	Qualification
1	Sweden	3	3	0	0	8	1	+7	9	Advance to knockout stage
2	Germany	3	2	0	1	5	5	0	6	Advance to knockout stage
3	Poland	3	1	0	2	3	7	−4	3	
4	Denmark	3	0	0	3	3	6	−3	0	

Source: UEFA
Rules for classification: Group stage tiebreakers
4 July 2025
21:00

Germany	2–0	Poland
Brand 52'; Schüller 66'	Report

Arena St.Gallen, St. Gallen
Attendance: 15,972
Referee: Stéphanie Frappart (France)

8 July 2025
18:00

Germany	2–1	Denmark
Nüsken 56' (pen.); Schüller 66'	Report	Vangsgaard 26'

St. Jakob-Park, Basel
Attendance: 34,165
Referee: Catarina Campos (Portugal)

12 July 2025
21:00

Sweden	4–1	Germany
Blackstenius 12'; Holmberg 25'; Rolfö 34' (pen.); Hurtig 80'	Report	Brand 7'

Stadion Letzigrund, Zurich
Attendance: 22,552
Referee: Silvia Gasperotti (Italy)

=== Quarter-finals ===
19 July 2025
21:00

France	1–1 (a.e.t.)	Germany
Geyoro 15' (pen.)	Report	Nüsken 25'
Penalties
Majri (penalty missed); Karchaoui (penalty scored); Malard (penalty scored); Baltimore (penalty scored); Jean-François (penalty scored); N'Dongala (penalty scored); Sombath (penalty missed)	5–6	(penalty scored) Minge; (penalty scored) Dallmann; (penalty scored) Knaak; (penalty missed) Däbritz; (penalty scored) Berger; (penalty scored) Bühl; (penalty scored) Nüsken

St. Jakob-Park, Basel
Attendance: 34,128
Referee: Tess Olofsson (Sweden)

=== Semi-finals ===
23 July 2025
21:00

Germany	0–1 (a.e.t.)	Spain
	Report	Bonmatí 113'

Stadion Letzigrund, Zurich
Attendance: 22,432
Referee: Edina Alves Batista (Brazil)

== Record ==
UEFA Women's Championship record								Qualifying record							
Year	Result	Pld	W	D	L	GF	GA	Pld	W	D	L	GF	GA	P/R	Rnk
1984****	Did not qualify							6	0	5	1	6	7	–	
(Norway) 1987	Did not qualify							6	2	1	3	5	7	–	
(West Germany) 1989	Champions	2	1	1	0	5	2	8	5	3	0	21	1	–	
(Denmark) 1991	Champions	2	2	0	0	6	1	8	7	1	0	24	2	–	
(Italy) 1993	Fourth place	2	0	1	1	2	4	3	2	1	0	10	0	–	
(England) (Germany) (Norway) (Sweden) 1995	Champions	3	3	0	0	9	4	8	8	0	0	60	0	–	
(Norway) (Sweden) 1997	Champions	5	3	2	0	6	1	8	6	1	1	22	3	–	
(Germany) 2001	Champions	5	5	0	0	13	1	6	5	1	0	27	5	–	
(England) 2005	Champions	5	5	0	0	15	2	8	8	0	0	50	2	–	
(Finland) 2009	Champions	6	6	0	0	21	5	8	8	0	0	34	1	–	
(Sweden) 2013	Champions	6	4	1	1	6	1	10	9	1	0	64	3	–	
(Netherlands) 2017	Quarter-finals	4	2	1	1	5	3	8	8	0	0	35	0	–	
(England) 2022	Runners-up	6	5	0	1	14	3	8	8	0	0	46	1	–	
(Switzerland) 2025	Semi-finals	5	2	1	2	6	7	6	5	0	1	17	8	Same position	3rd
(Germany) 2029															
Total	13/15	51	38	7*	6	108	34	101	81	14*	6	421	40	3rd	

*Denotes draws including knockout matches decided on penalty kicks.
**Gold background colour indicates that the tournament was won.
***Red border colour indicates tournament was held on home soil.
****Missing flag indicates no host country; tournament was played in two-leg knockout rounds (with the exception of the 1995 final).

== Head-to-head record ==
Opponent	Pld	W	D	L	GF	GA	GD	Win %
Austria	1	1	0	0	2	0	+2	100.00
Denmark	5	3	0	2	10	6	+4	60.00
England	5	4	0	1	16	6	+10	80.00
Finland	2	2	0	0	7	1	+6	100.00
France	4	3	1	0	11	3	+8	75.00
Iceland	2	2	0	0	4	0	+4	100.00
Italy	9	6	3	0	17	5	+12	66.67
Netherlands	1	0	1	0	0	0	+0	0.00
Norway	10	8	1	1	20	5	+15	80.00
Poland	1	1	0	0	2	0	+2	100.00
Russia	2	2	0	0	7	0	+7	100.00
Spain	2	1	0	1	2	1	+1	50.00
Sweden	7	5	1	1	10	7	+3	71.43
Total	51	38	7	6	108	34	+74	74.51

== See also ==
- Germany at the FIFA Women's World Cup
