= 2012 Cyprus Women's Cup =

Tournament details
- Host country: Cyprus
- Dates: 28 February – 6 March 2012
- Teams: 12 (from 5 confederations)
- Venue(s): 5 (in 4 host cities)

Final positions
- Champions: France (1st title)
- Runners-up: Canada
- Third place: Italy
- Fourth place: England

Tournament statistics
- Matches played: 24
- Goals scored: 66 (2.75 per match)
- Top scorer(s): (Finland) Linda Sällström (5 goals)

The 2012 Cyprus Women's Cup was the fifth edition of the Cyprus Women's Cup, an invitational women's football tournament held annually in Cyprus. It took place between 28 February – 6 March 2012.

== Format ==
The twelve invited teams were split into three groups that played a round-robin tournament.

Groups A and B, containing the strongest ranked teams, were the only ones in contention to win the title. The group winners from A and B contested the final, with the runners-up playing for third place. The Group C winner faced the better 3rd place team from Groups A and B for 5th, with the Group C runner-up facing the other third place team for 7th. Group C's third place team faced the better fourth place team of Groups A and B, while the other two 4th place teams play in the 11th place match.

Points awarded in the group stage followed the standard formula of three points for a win, one point for a draw and zero points for a loss. In the case of two teams being tied on the same number of points in a group, their head-to-head result determined the higher place.

== Venues ==
Games were played in five host stadiums in four cities.

| Stadium | City | Capacity |
|---|---|---|
| GSP Stadium | Nicosia | 22,859 |
| GSZ Stadium | Larnaca | 13,032 |
| Dasaki Stadium | Achna | 7,000 |
| Paralimni Stadium | Paralimni | 5,800 |
| Ammochostos Stadium | Larnaca | 5,500 |

== Teams ==
Listed are the confirmed teams.

- Canada
- England
- Finland
- France
- Italy
- New Zealand
- Netherlands
- Northern Ireland
- Scotland
- South Africa
- South Korea
- Switzerland

== Group stage ==
All times are local (EET/UTC+2).

=== Group A ===
| Team | Pld | W | D | L | GF | GA | GD | Pts |
|---|---|---|---|---|---|---|---|---|
| France | 3 | 3 | 0 | 0 | 8 | 1 | +7 | 9 |
| England | 3 | 2 | 0 | 1 | 4 | 4 | 0 | 6 |
| Finland | 3 | 1 | 0 | 2 | 5 | 6 | −1 | 3 |
| Switzerland | 3 | 0 | 0 | 3 | 1 | 7 | −6 | 0 |

28 February 2012
14:30

| France | 3–0 | Switzerland |
|---|---|---|
| Delie 5'; Thiney 18'; Bompastor 38' (pen.) | Report |

GSP Stadium, Nicosia
Attendance: 20
Referee: Jenny Palmqvist (Sweden)
28 February 2012
17:30

| England | 3–1 | Finland |
|---|---|---|
| Smith 36' (pen.), 88' (pen.); Carney 50' | Report | Tolvanen 8' |

GSP Stadium, Nicosia

1 March 2012
14:30

| Switzerland | 0–1 | England |
|---|---|---|
| | Report | Williams 77' |

GSZ Stadium, Larnaca
Referee: Kirsi Heikkinen (Finland)
1 March 2012
17:30

| Finland | 1–2 | France |
|---|---|---|
| Sällström 63' | Report | Le Sommer 35'; Renard 71' |

GSZ Stadium, Larnaca
Referee: Esther Staubli (Switzerland)

4 March 2012
17:30

| England | 0–3 | France |
|---|---|---|
| | Report | Nécib 14'; Delie 49'; Thiney 80' |

Paralimni Stadium, Paralimni
Referee: Kirsi Heikkinen (Finland)
4 March 2012
17:30

| Finland | 3–1 | Switzerland |
|---|---|---|
| Sällström 25', 33', 47' | Report | Crnogorčević 58' |

Paralimni Stadium, Paralimni
Referee: Vivian Peeters (Netherlands)

=== Group B ===
| Team | Pld | W | D | L | GF | GA | GD | Pts |
|---|---|---|---|---|---|---|---|---|
| Canada | 3 | 3 | 0 | 0 | 8 | 2 | +6 | 9 |
| Italy | 3 | 1 | 0 | 2 | 4 | 5 | −1 | 3 |
| Netherlands | 3 | 1 | 0 | 2 | 3 | 4 | −1 | 3 |
| Scotland | 3 | 1 | 0 | 2 | 4 | 8 | −4 | 3 |

28 February 2012
14:30

| Netherlands | 2–1 | Italy |
|---|---|---|
| Melis 53'; Martens 61' | Report | Panico 39' |

GSZ Stadium, Larnaca
Attendance: 15
Referee: Esther Staubli (Switzerland)
28 February 2012
17:30

| Canada | 5–1 | Scotland |
|---|---|---|
| Parker 6'; Schmidt 36', 51'; Sinclair 59'; Tancredi 64' | Report | J. Ross 13' |

GSZ Stadium, Larnaca

1 March 2012
14:30

| Scotland | 2–1 | Netherlands |
|---|---|---|
| Van den Berg 24' (o.g.); Lauder 59' | Report | Spitse 24' |

GSP Stadium, Nicosia
1 March 2012
17:30

| Italy | 1–2 | Canada |
|---|---|---|
| Iannella 45+1' | Report | Sinclair 43'; Gayle 90+2' |

GSP Stadium, Nicosia

4 March 2012
14:30

| Italy | 2–1 | Scotland |
|---|---|---|
| Guagni 43'; Gabbiadini 69' | Report | L. Ross 67' |

Paralimni Stadium, Paralimni
4 March 2012
14:30

| Netherlands | 0–1 | Canada |
|---|---|---|
| | Report | Zurrer 84' |

Paralimni Stadium, Paralimni

=== Group C ===
| Team | Pld | W | D | L | GF | GA | GD | Pts |
|---|---|---|---|---|---|---|---|---|
| South Korea | 3 | 2 | 1 | 0 | 4 | 2 | +2 | 7 |
| New Zealand | 3 | 1 | 2 | 0 | 3 | 1 | +2 | 5 |
| South Africa | 3 | 1 | 1 | 1 | 3 | 2 | +1 | 4 |
| Northern Ireland | 3 | 0 | 0 | 3 | 0 | 5 | −5 | 0 |

28 February 2012
14:30

| South Korea | 2–1 | South Africa |
|---|---|---|
| Cha Yun-hee 51'; Yeo Min-ji 69' | Report | Dlamini 9' |

Dasaki Stadium, Achna
28 February 2012
17:30

| New Zealand | 2–0 | Northern Ireland |
|---|---|---|
| Hearn 54', 60' | Report |

GSZ Stadium, Larnaca

1 March 2012
14:30

| Northern Ireland | 0–1 | South Korea |
|---|---|---|
| | Report | Cha Yun-Hee 7' |

GSZ Stadium, Larnaca
1 March 2012
17:30

| South Africa | 0–0 | New Zealand |
|---|---|---|
| | Report |

Ammochostos Stadium, Larnaca

4 March 2012
14:30

| New Zealand | 1–1 | South Korea |
|---|---|---|
| Gregorius 53' | Report | Cha Yun-hee 38' |

Paralimni Stadium, Paralimni
4 March 2012
17:30

| Northern Ireland | 0–2 | South Africa |
|---|---|---|
| | Report | Ntsibande 48', 78' |

Paralimni Stadium, Paralimni

== Knockout stage ==
=== Eleventh place match ===
6 March 2012
12:00

| Switzerland | 5–0 | Northern Ireland |
|---|---|---|
| Crnogorčević 16', 81'; Mändly 54'; Schwarz 76'; Mehmeti 90' |

Ammochostos Stadium, Larnaca

=== Ninth place match ===
6 March 2012
12:00

| Scotland | 2–0 | South Africa |
|---|---|---|
| Little 8', 25' (pen.) |

Paralimni Stadium, Paralimni

=== Seventh place match ===
6 March 2012
14:00

| New Zealand | 2–2 (a.e.t.) | Netherlands |
|---|---|---|
| Hearn 45+1' (pen.); Gregorius 55' | Report | Smit 35' (pen.), 57' |
Penalties
| Penalty scored Penalty missed | 2–4 | (penalty scored) Smit; (penalty scored) Heuver; (penalty scored) Spitse; (penalty scored) van de Ven |

Dasaki Stadium, Achna
Referee: Kirsi Heikkinen (Finland)

=== Fifth place match ===
6 March 2012
14:00

| South Korea | 1–1 (a.e.t.) | Finland |
|---|---|---|
| Cha Yun-hee 56' | | Sällström 53' |
Penalties
| | 7–6 |

GSZ Stadium, Larnaca

=== Third place match ===
6 March 2012
14:30

| England | 1–3 | Italy |
|---|---|---|
| Moore 26' | | Panico 59'; Conti 64'; Gabbiandini 86' |

Paralimni Stadium, Paralimni

=== Final ===
6 March 2012
17:30

| France | 2–0 | Canada |
|---|---|---|
| Delie 31'; Nécib 62' (pen.) |

GSZ Stadium, Larnaca

== Champion ==
2012 Cyprus Cup

France
First title

== Goalscorers ==
5 goals

- (Finland) Linda Sällström

4 goals

- (South Korea) Cha Yun-hee

3 goals

- (Switzerland) Ana-Maria Crnogorčević

2 goals

- (Canada) Sophie Schmidt
- (Canada) Christine Sinclair
- (England) Kelly Smith
- (France) Louisa Nécib
- (France) Marie-Laure Delie
- (France) Gaëtane Thiney
- (Italy) Melania Gabbiadini
- (Italy) Patrizia Panico
- (New Zealand) Amber Hearn
- (Scotland) Kim Little
- (South Africa) Nomathemba Ntsibande

1 goal

- (Canada) Robyn Gayle
- (Canada) Kelly Parker
- (Canada) Melissa Tancredi
- (Canada) Emily Zurrer
- (England) Karen Carney
- (England) Fara Williams
- (England) Jade Moore
- (Finland) Marianna Tolvanen
- (France) Sonia Bompastor
- (France) Eugénie Le Sommer
- (France) Wendie Renard
- (Italy) Alia Guagni
- (Italy) Sandy Iannella
- (Italy) Pamela Conti
- (Netherlands) Lieke Martens
- (Netherlands) Manon Melis
- (Netherlands) Sherida Spitse
- (New Zealand) Sarah Gregorius
- (Scotland) Hayley Lauder
- (Scotland) Jane Ross
- (Scotland) Leanne Ross
- (South Africa) Amanda Dlamini
- (South Korea) Yeo Min-ji
- (Switzerland) Jehona Mehmeti
- (Switzerland) Sandy Maendly
- (Switzerland) Daniela Schwarz

Own goal

- (Netherlands) Mandy van den Berg (playing against Scotland)
