= Solodky =

Solodky, Solodki, Solodkyy, Solodkiy, Solodkyi (Ukrainian: Солодкий), feminine: Solodka, Solodkaya is a Ukrainian-language surname literally meaning "sweet". Notable people with the surname include:

- Natalya Solodkaya, Russian footballer
