= Serie A Female Footballer of the Year =

AIC Serie A Female Footballer of the Year
- Sport: Association football
- Competition: Serie A
- Awarded for: Female footballer considered to have performed the best in each given Serie A season
- Local name: Calciatrice dell'anno AIC (Italian)
- Country: Italy
- Presented by: Italian Footballers' Association (AIC)

History
- First award: 2012
- Editions: 14
- First winner: (Italy) Melania Gabbiadini (2011–12)
- Most wins: (Italy) Melania Gabbiadini (4 times)
- Most recent: (Italy) Sofia Cantore (2024–25)
- Website: Official website

The AIC Serie A Female Footballer of the Year (Italian: Calciatrice dell'anno AIC) is a yearly award organized by the Italian Footballers' Association (AIC) given to the female footballer who has been considered to have performed the best over the previous women's football Serie A season.

The award was part of the Gran Galà del Calcio (formerly known as Oscar del Calcio), but it's been rebranded Women4Football since the 2022–23 season.

Melania Gabbiadini has won the award a record four times, all consecutively.

== Winners ==
Year	Player	Club	Ref(s)
2011–12	(Italy) Melania Gabbiadini	AGSM Verona	
2012–13	(Italy) Melania Gabbiadini	AGSM Verona	
2013–14	(Italy) Melania Gabbiadini	AGSM Verona	
2014–15	(Italy) Melania Gabbiadini	AGSM Verona	
2015–16	(Italy) Barbara Bonansea	Brescia	
2016–17	(Italy) Alia Guagni	Fiorentina	
2017–18	(Italy) Alia Guagni	Fiorentina	
2018–19	(Italy) Manuela Giugliano	Milan	
2019–20	(Italy) Cristiana Girelli	Juventus	
2020–21	(Italy) Cristiana Girelli	Juventus	
2021–22	(Italy) Lisa Boattin	Juventus	
2022–23	(Malawi) Tabitha Chawinga	Inter Milan	
2023–24	(Italy) Manuela Giugliano	Roma	
2024–25	(Italy) Sofia Cantore	Juventus	

=== By club ===
Club	Players	Total
AGSM Verona	1	4
Juventus	3	4
Fiorentina	1	2
Brescia	1	1
Milan	1	1
Inter Milan	1	1
Roma	1	1

=== By country ===
Country	Players	Total
Italy	7	13
Malawi	1	1

=== By position ===
Position	Players	Total
Forward	5	9
Defender	2	3
Midfielder	1	2
