= Tatiana Zaitseva =

Russian footballer

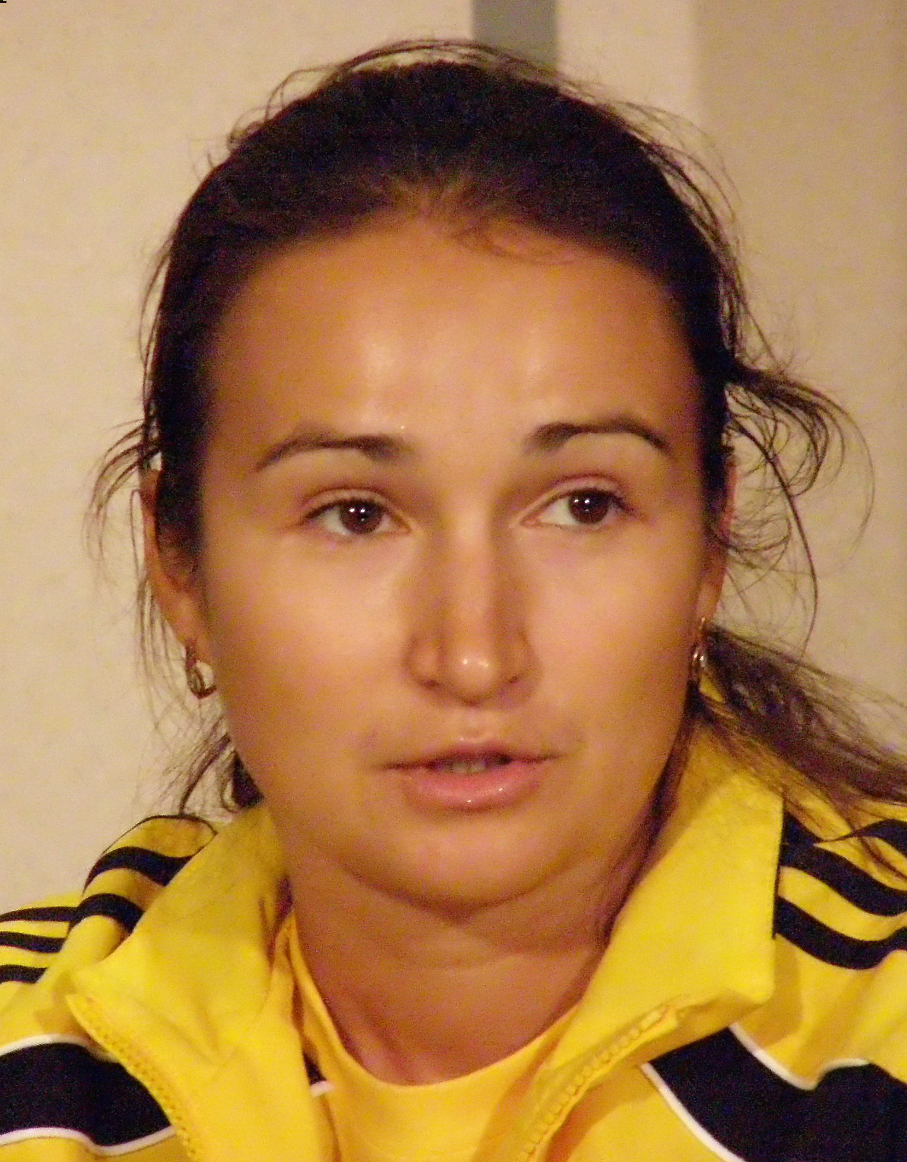

Personal information
- Full name: Tatiana Vladimirovna Zaitseva
- Date of birth: 27 August 1978 (age 48)
- Place of birth: Soviet Union
- Height: 1.70 m (5 ft 7 in)
- Position: Defender

Senior career*
Years	Team	Apps	(Gls)
~1996	Kubanochka Krasnodar		
~2002	Energiya Voronezh		
~2005	Ryazan VDV		
2007–2008	Kubanochka Krasnodar		

International career
- Russia

Managerial career
- 2007–2019: Kubanochka Krasnodar
- 2020–: WFC Krasnodar
- * Club domestic league appearances and goals

Tatiana Zaitseva is a former football defender. Throughout her career she played for Kubanochka Krasnodar, Energiya Voronezh and Ryazan VDV. She was a member of the Russian national team, and played the 1999 and 2003 World Cups.

In 2007, she reestablished Kubanochka Krasnodar, which had been disbanded in 2000. She currently serves as the club's president and coach in the Russian women's football championship., but the club has been dissolved during 2019 season. In February 2020 she was appointed as manager of newly established WFC Krasnodar.
