= Nomathemba Ntsibande =

South African soccer player (born 1986)

Personal information
- Full name: Nomathemba Charlotte Ntsibande
- Date of birth: 19 April 1986 (age 40)
- Place of birth: KwaThema, Gauteng, South Africa
- Position: Defender

Team information
- Current team: JVW F.C.

Youth career
- 1998–2018: Springs Home Sweepers

Senior career*
Years	Team	Apps	(Gls)
2018–	JVW F.C.		

International career
2011–	South Africa	36	(6)
- * Club domestic league appearances and goals

Nomathemba "Lanka" Ntsibande (born 19 April 1986) is a South African soccer player who plays as a defender for SAFA Women's League side JVW F.C. and the South Africa women's national team.

== Club career ==
=== Springs Home Sweepers ===
Ntsibande joined Sasol Women's League side Springs Home Sweepers as a 12-year-old and spent a large part of her career playing for the club.

=== JVW ===
In 2018, she joined Sasol Women's League side JVW F.C. She made her debut on 7 April 2028 in a 1–0 victory over the University of Pretoria's amaTuks. She was part of the 2019 team that won the Gauteng Sasol League and went on to win their maiden National league title.

== International career ==
In March 2012, she competed for the South Africa women's national soccer team in an international friendly against Ghana and was one of the penalty takers in a 5-4 penalty shootout win. The match had ended in a 1–1 draw.

She was also part of the Banyana Banyana team for the 2012 CAF Women's Olympic qualifying tournament but did not make it to the 2012 Olympic team due to an injury. She was named in the squad that took on Gabon in the 2015 CAF Women's Olympic qualifying tournament second round qualifier which they won 8–2 on aggregate.

She was part of the squad that took part in the 2016 Women's Africa Cup of Nations tournament where they finished in fourth place.

== Honours ==
JVW

- SAFA Women's League runners-up: 2025
- 2019 Sasol League National Championship
- 2019 Gauteng Sasol Women's League
