= Maria Lindblad Christensen =

Danish footballer (born 1995)

Personal information
- Full name: Maria Lindblad Christensen
- Date of birth: 3 July 1995 (age 31)
- Place of birth: Viborg, Denmark
- Position: Goalkeeper

Team information
- Current team: FC Nordsjælland
- Number: 16

Youth career
- –2007: Houlkær
- 2005–2012: Team Viborg

Senior career*
Years	Team	Apps	(Gls)
2012–2019	Fortuna Hjørring	8	(0)
2019–	FC Nordsjælland	1	(0)

International career
2010–2011	Denmark U16	8	(0)
2010–2012	Denmark U17	20	(0)
2012–2014	Denmark U19	22	(0)
2016	Denmark U23	1	(0)
2016–	Denmark	1	(0)
Medal record
Women's football
Representing Denmark
UEFA Women's Championship
Silver medal – second place	2017 Netherlands	Team
- * Club domestic league appearances and goals

Maria Lindblad Christensen (born 3 July 1995) is a Danish footballer who plays as a goalkeeper for FC Nordsjælland in the Elitedivisionen.

== Club career ==
Christensen began her career at the age of four in the Houlkær boys' team. In 2005, she joined the female side of Team Viborg. At the age of 16, Christensen moved to Viborg's first team playing the 3F League. In the summer of 2012, she signed to play for Fortuna Hjørring in the Elitedivisionen. Christensen debuted on 23 September 2012 in a match against Taastrup FC. She was 16 when she debuted in the UEFA Women's Champions League, replacing Heidi Johansen who was suddenly injured.

== International career ==
Since 2010, Christensen has played for several Danish national youth teams. On 22 October 2016, she debuted for Danish Senior team in a match against Iceland. Christensen was also part of the team which represented Denmark at the UEFA Women's Euro 2017, where they reached the competition final for the first time in history, but eventually lost to the Netherlands.
