= WFC Krasnodar =

Krasnodar
- Full name: Женский Футбольный клуб Краснодар (Football Club Krasnodar)
- Nickname: The Black-Greens
- Founded: 4 February 2020; 5 years ago
- Ground: Krasnodar Academy Stadium, Krasnodar
- Capacity: 3,500
- Owner: Sergey Galitsky
- Chairman: Sergey Galitsky
- Manager: Tatiana Zaitseva
- League: Russian Women Football League
- 2025: 5th
- Website: http://fckrasnodar.ru
Home colours	Away colours

WFC Krasnodar is the women's team of Russian football club FC Krasnodar. The club was established on 4 February 2020 and will participate in the Russian Women's Football Championship, the top division of Russian women football.

== History ==
The club was formed by FC Krasnodar with support from the government of Krasnodar Krai to replace Kubanochka Krasnodar, which was dissolved in February 2020.

== Players ==
=== Current squad ===
As of 12 September 2022..

Note: Flags indicate national team as defined under FIFA eligibility rules; some limited exceptions apply. Players may hold more than one non-FIFA nationality.

No.	Pos.	Nation	Player
4	DF	RUS	Daniela Basaeva
—	DF	RUS	Anna Desyatnik
—	DF	RUS	Zarina Gedeeva
—	DF	RUS	Anastasia Kislitsyna
—	DF	RUS	Victoria Klochko
—	FW	RUS	Yulia Anisimova
—	DF	RUS	Viktoria Shkoda
—	MF	RUS	Elena Kostareva
—	DF	RUS	Valentina Smirnova
—	MF	RUS	Angelina Lazutova

No.	Pos.	Nation	Player
—	GK	RUS	Natalia Stanovova
—	DF	RUS	Anna Sinko
—	MF	RUS	Polina Organova
23	DF	RUS	Yana Vorobyoba
—	MF	RUS	Snezhanna Yastrebinskaya
—	DF	RUS	Medea Zharkova
—	MF	RUS	Natalya Solodkaya
—	FW	RUS	Karina Samoylenko
—	FW	RUS	Ekaterina Frolova
—	MF	RUS	Alina Likhota
—	GK	RUS	Elena Kochneva
