= Tatyana Shcherbak =

Russian footballer (born 1997)

Personal information
- Full name: Tatyana Shcherbak
- Date of birth: 22 October 1997 (age 29)
- Place of birth: Trudobelikovskiy, Russia
- Height: 1.72 m (5 ft 8 in)
- Position: Goalkeeper

Team information
- Current team: Lokomotiv Moscow

Youth career
- 2013–2015: Kubanochka

Senior career*
Years	Team	Apps	(Gls)
2015–2019	Kubanochka	61	(0)
2020–2021	Krasnodar	15	(0)
2021–	Lokomotiv Moscow	67	(0)

International career
2017–	Russia	18	(0)
- * Club domestic league appearances and goals as of 19 May 2025

Tatyana Shcherbak (Russian: Татьяна Щербак; born 22 October 1997) is a Russian footballer who plays for Krasnodar and the Russia national team.

She played for Russia at UEFA Women's Euro 2017.
