= Daria Makarenko =

Russian footballer (born 1992)

Personal information
- Full name: Daria Makarenko
- Date of birth: 7 March 1992 (age 34)
- Place of birth: Sibirtsevo 2-ye, Russia
- Height: 1.71 m (5 ft 7 1/2 in)
- Position: Defender

Senior career*
Years	Team	Apps	(Gls)
2012–2016	Zvezda 2005 Perm	28	(2)
2017	Ryazan-VDV	7	(0)

International career^{‡}
2010	Russia U-17	7	(0)
2008–2011	Russia U-19	34	(7)
2011–2017	Russia	56	(4)
- * Club domestic league appearances and goals as of 14 July 2013 ‡ National team caps and goals as of 13:45, 19 July 2013 (UTC)

Daria Makarenko (born 7 March 1992) is a former Russian footballer. She played as a defender for Zvezda 2005 Perm and the Russia national team.

== Club career ==
She played for Zvezda 2005 Perm since 2012. Twice during her career, she scored a goal from practically the center pitch.

== International career ==
She took part in 2011 UEFA Women's U-19 Championship. She was called up to be part of the national team for the UEFA Women's Euro 2013.

== Personal life ==
Makarenko was born in Sibirtsevo 2-ye, Vengerovsky District, Novosibirsk Oblast.

== Honours ==
Zvezda 2005 Perm

Winner

- Russian Women's Cup: 2012, 2013

== International goals ==
No.	Date	Venue	Opponent	Score	Result	Competition
1.	29 November 2015	Pancho Arena, Felcsút, Hungary	Hungary	1–0	1–0	UEFA Women's Euro 2017 qualifying
2.	2 March 2016	Albufeira Municipal Stadium, Albufeira, Portugal	Portugal	1–0	1–0	2016 Algarve Cup
3.	3 March 2017	Estádio Algarve, Faro, Portugal	Canada	1–2	1–2	2017 Algarve Cup
