= Elvira Ziyastinova =

Russian footballer

Personal information
- Full name: Elvira Ziyastinova
- Date of birth: 13 February 1991 (age 35)
- Place of birth: Izhevsk, Soviet Union
- Height: 1.58 m (5 ft 2 in)
- Position: Defender

Team information
- Current team: FC Minsk (on loan from Lokomotiv Moscow)
- Number: 30

Senior career*
Years	Team	Apps	(Gls)
2009–2010	Zvezda Zvenigorod		
2011	Zorky Krasnogorsk		
2012–2013	Mordovochka Saransk		
2013–2016	Rossiyanka		
2017	CSKA Moscow	6	(0)
2017	Rossiyanka	6	(0)
2018	Yenisey	14	(1)
2019–	Lokomotiv Moscow	25	(1)
2022-	→ FC Minsk (loan)	11	(3)

International career^{‡}
2015–	Russia	27	(0)
Medal record
Women's football
Representing Russia
Summer Universiade
Bronze medal – third place	2017 Taipei	Women's
- * Club domestic league appearances and goals as of 18:55, 13 August 2022 (UTC) ‡ National team caps and goals as of 01:45, 4 June 2019

Elvira Rinatovna Ziyastinova (Russian: Эльвира Ринатовна Зиястинова; born 13 February 1991) is a Russian footballer who plays for FC Minsk on loan from Lokomotiv Moscow and the Russia national team.

She played for Russia at UEFA Women's Euro 2017.
