= Anna Cholovyaga =

Russian footballer (born 1992)

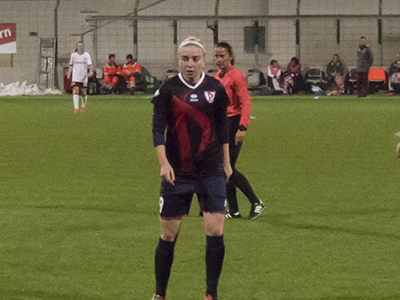

Personal information
- Full name: Anna Cholovyaga
- Date of birth: 8 May 1992 (age 34)
- Place of birth: Russia
- Height: 1.67 m (5 ft 5 1/2 in)
- Position: Midfielder

Senior career*
Years	Team	Apps	(Gls)
2009–2010	Zvezda Zvenigorod	23	(12)
2010–2017	WFC Rossiyanka	55	(4)

International career
2012–2017	Russia		
Medal record
Women's football
Representing Russia
Summer Universiade
Bronze medal – third place	2017 Taipei	Women's
- * Club domestic league appearances and goals as of 3 October 2013

Anna Valeryevna Cholovyaga (Russian: Анна Валерьевна Чоловяга) is a former Russian football midfielder, who played for WFC Rossiyanka in the Russian Championship and the Russian national team.

She started her career in Zvezda Zvenigorod. In 2010, she moved to WFC Rossiyanka, with which she made her UEFA Champions League debut in the 2010–11 season. She has won two leagues and one cup with Rossiyanka.

A former under-19 international, in 2012 she made her debut for the senior Russian national team in the 2013 UEFA Euro's qualifying, where she made three appearances. She wasn't called up for the final tournament.

== Personal life ==
Her husband Kirill Zaika is a professional football player.
