= Alia Guagni =

Italian footballer (born 1987)

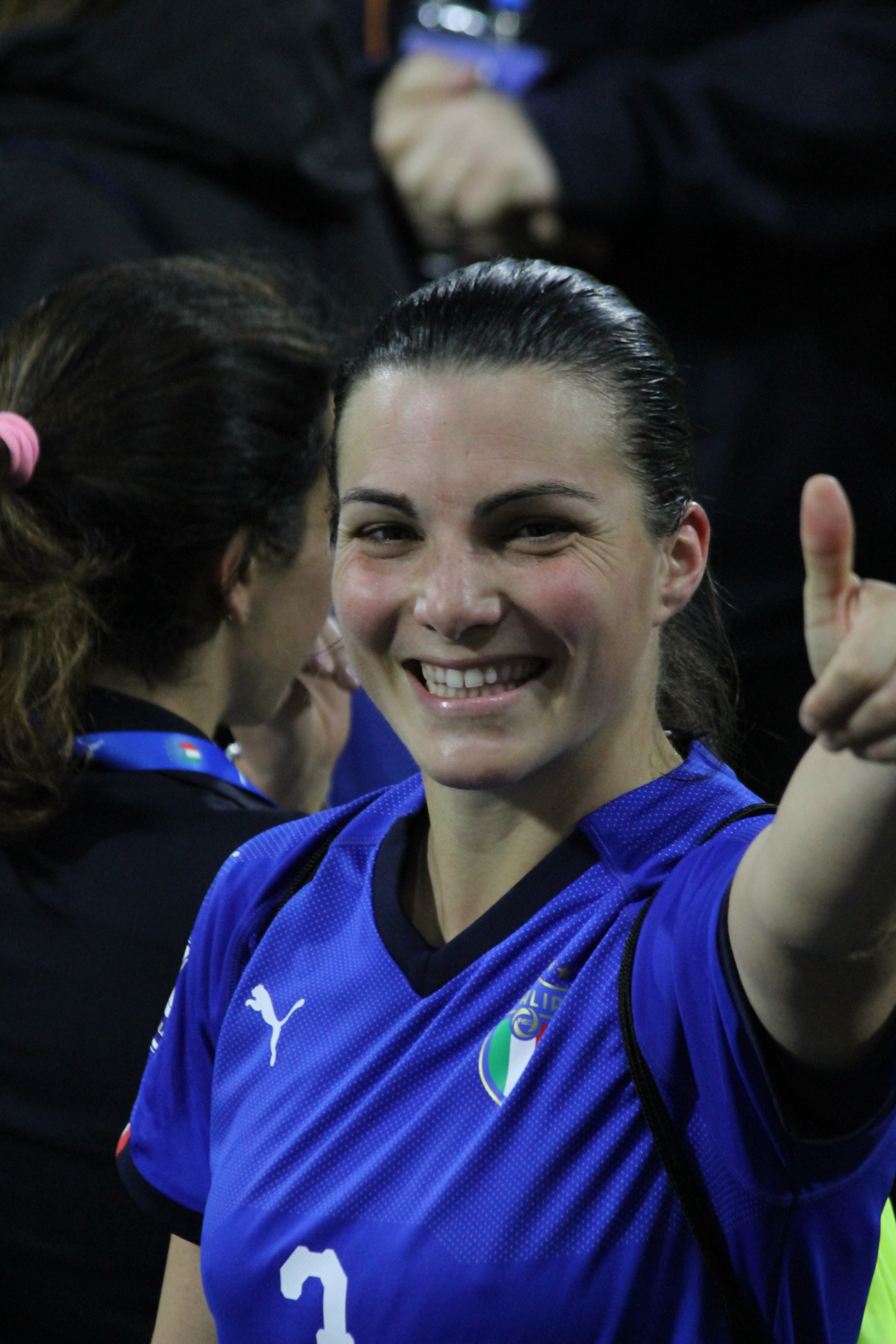
- Guagni in 2018

Personal information
- Date of birth: 1 October 1987 (age 39)
- Place of birth: Florence, Italy
- Height: 1.70 m (5 ft 7 in)
- Position: Defender

Senior career*
Years	Team	Apps	(Gls)
2002–2015	ACF Firenze	115	(47)
2013	→ Pali Blues (loan)		
2015–2020	Fiorentina	75	(19)
2020–2022	Atlético Madrid	18	(0)
2022–2024	AC Milan	41	(1)
2024–2025	Como	20	(0)

International career^{‡}
2009–2022	Italy	74	(5)
- * Club domestic league appearances and goals as of 03:18, 27 May 2025 (UTC) ‡ National team caps and goals as of 18 June 2019

Alia Guagni (born 1 October 1987) is an Italian former professional footballer who played as a defender.

During her career, Guagni won the Serie A Female Footballer of the Year twice (in 2017 and 2018) and was named in the AIC Best Women's XI twice (in 2019 and 2020). She spent most of her career in Italy, apart from a spell in Spain with Atlético Madrid. Guagni also appeared for Italy at two major competitions, appearing at the UEFA Women's Euro 2017 and the 2019 FIFA Women's World Cup.

== Club career ==
She previously played for ACF Firenze and Fiorentina.

Guagni scored her first career hattrick against Torino Women ASD on 19 January 2013.

In summer 2013, Guagni joined Pali Blues on loan.

On 8 July 2020, Guagni was announced at Atlético Madrid on a three year contract.

On 3 January 2022, Guagni was announced at AC Milan on a one and a half year contract.

On 12 August 2024, Guagni was announced at Como on a one year contract.

On 6 May 2025, Guagni announced her retirement from football. She played the last match of her career against Napoli on 11 May 2025, retiring as Como's captain.

== International career ==
In November 2016, Guagni was called up to the Italy squad for the Torneo Internazionale Manhaus 2016.

Guagni was called up to the Italy squad for the UEFA Women's Euro 2017.

Guagni was called up to the Italy squad for the 2019 FIFA Women's World Cup.

Guagni scored her last international goal against Georgia on 8 November 2019.

== After football ==
After retiring, Guagni and Como co-founded the Beyond project, which aims to support players who have retired in their life after football.

== International goals ==
No.	Date	Venue	Opponent	Score	Result	Competition
1.	4 March 2012	Paralimni Stadium, Paralimni, Cyprus	Scotland	1–0	2–1	2012 Cyprus Women's Cup
2.	4 March 2015	GSP Stadium, Nicosia, Cyprus	South Korea	2–1	2–1	2015 Cyprus Women's Cup
3.	11 March 2015	GSZ Stadium, Larnaca, Cyprus	Mexico	2–1	2–3	2015 Cyprus Women's Cup
4.	9 March 2016	GSZ Stadium, Larnaca, Cyprus	Czech Republic	1–1	3–1	2016 Cyprus Women's Cup
5.	20 September 2016	Stadio Silvio Piola, Vercelli, Italy	Czech Republic	3–1	3–1	UEFA Women's Euro 2017 qualifying
6.	8 November 2019	Stadio Ciro Vigorito, Benevento, Italy	Georgia	2–0	6–0	UEFA Women's Euro 2022 qualifying

== Honours ==
ACF Firenze

- Serie B: 2002–03
- Serie A2: 2005–06, 2009–10

Fiorentina

- Serie A: 2016–17
- Coppa Italia: 2016–17, 2017–18
- Supercoppa Italiana: 2018

Atlético Madrid

- Supercopa de España Femenina: 2020–21

Individual

- Serie A Female Footballer of the Year: 2017, 2018
- AIC Best Women's XI: 2019, 2020
