= Ekaterina Morozova =

Russian footballer (born 1991)

Personal information
- Full name: Ekaterina Morozova
- Date of birth: 26 March 1991 (age 35)
- Place of birth: Soviet Union
- Position: Defender

Team information
- Current team: Yenisey Krasnoyarsk

Senior career*
Years	Team	Apps	(Gls)
2010–2013	Kubanochka	56	(0)
2014–2015	Zorky	8	(0)
2016–2020	Chertanovo Moscow	35	(2)
2020–2021	Zenit	22	(2)
2022-	Yenisey Krasnoyarsk	0	(0)

International career
2017–	Russia		
- * Club domestic league appearances and goals

Ekaterina Morozova (born 26 March 1991) is a Russian footballer who plays for Yenisey Krasnoyarsk and the Russia national team.

She played for Russia at UEFA Women's Euro 2017.
