= Marta Carissimi =

Italian footballer (born 1987)

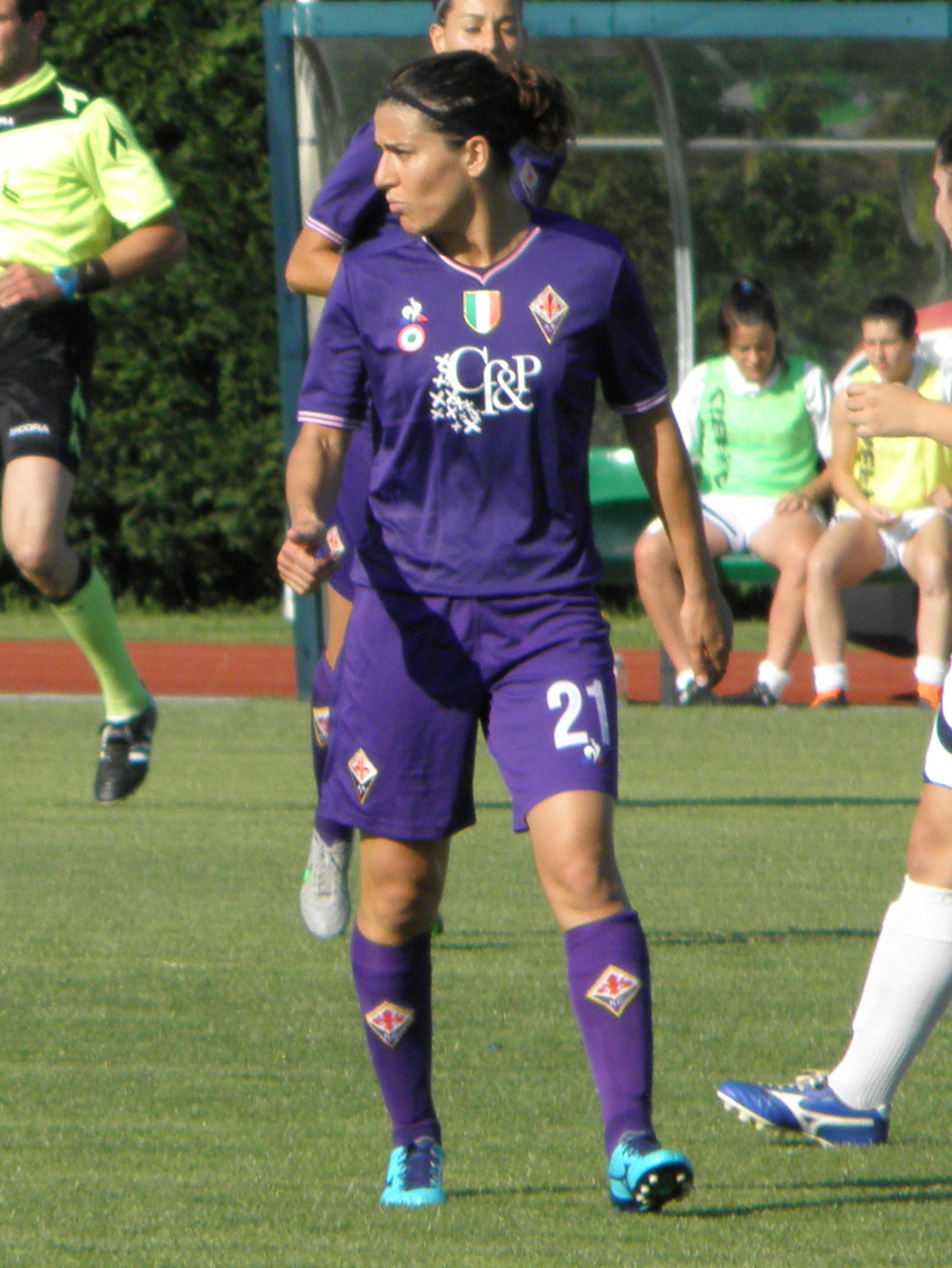
- Carissimi in 2018

Personal information
- Date of birth: 3 May 1987 (age 39)
- Place of birth: Turin, Italy
- Height: 1.70 m (5 ft 7 in)
- Position: Midfielder

Senior career*
Years	Team	Apps	(Gls)
2003–2011	Torino	88	(8)
2011–2013	Bardolino	48	(6)
2013–2014	Inter Milan	23	(2)
2014	Stjarnan	12	(4)
2014–2016	AGSM Verona	35	(4)
2016–2018	Fiorentina	39	(2)
2018–2020	Milan	12	(0)

International career
2007–2017	Italy		
- * Club domestic league appearances and goals as of 11 July 2017

Marta Carissimi (born 3 May 1987) is an Italian footballer who plays as a midfielder for AC Milan Women in Serie A.

== Club career ==
She previously played for ACF Torino, CF Bardolino (now AGSM Verona), Inter Milan and Stjarnan (of Iceland). With Bardolino / Verona she has also played the UEFA Champions League.

In 2018 she moved to newly formed AC Milan Women.

== International career ==
She has been a member of the Italian national team since 2007, playing the 2009 European Championship.

Carissimi was called up to the Italy squad for the UEFA Women's Euro 2017.

== Career statistics ==
=== International ===
Scores and results list Italy's goal tally first, score column indicates score after each Carissimi goal.

List of international goals scored by Marta Carissimi
No.	Date	Venue	Opponent	Score	Result	Competition	Ref.
	September 19, 2009	Domžale	Slovenia	5–0	8–0	2011 FIFA Women's World Cup qualification	
	May 8, 2014	Skopje	Macedonia	9–0	11–0	2015 FIFA Women's World Cup qualification	
