= Natalya Solodkaya =

Russian footballer (born 1995)

Personal information
- Full name: Natalya Solodkaya
- Date of birth: 4 April 1995 (age 31)
- Place of birth: Malamino, Uspensky District, Krasnodar Krai, Russia
- Height: 1.69 m (5 ft 6 1/2 in)
- Position: Midfielder

Team information
- Current team: Krasnodar

Youth career
- 2010–2013: Kubanochka

Senior career*
Years	Team	Apps	(Gls)
2013–2019	Kubanochka	34	(1)
2020–	Krasnodar	0	(0)

International career
2017–	Russia	3	(0)
- * Club domestic league appearances and goals as of 29 February 2020

Natalya Vladimirovna Solodkaya (Russian: Наталья Владимировна Солодкая; born 4 April 1995) is a Russian footballer who plays for Krasnodar and the Russia national team. Master of Sports of Russia (2016).

She played for Russia at UEFA Women's Euro 2017.
