= Ilaria Mauro =

Italian footballer (born 1988)

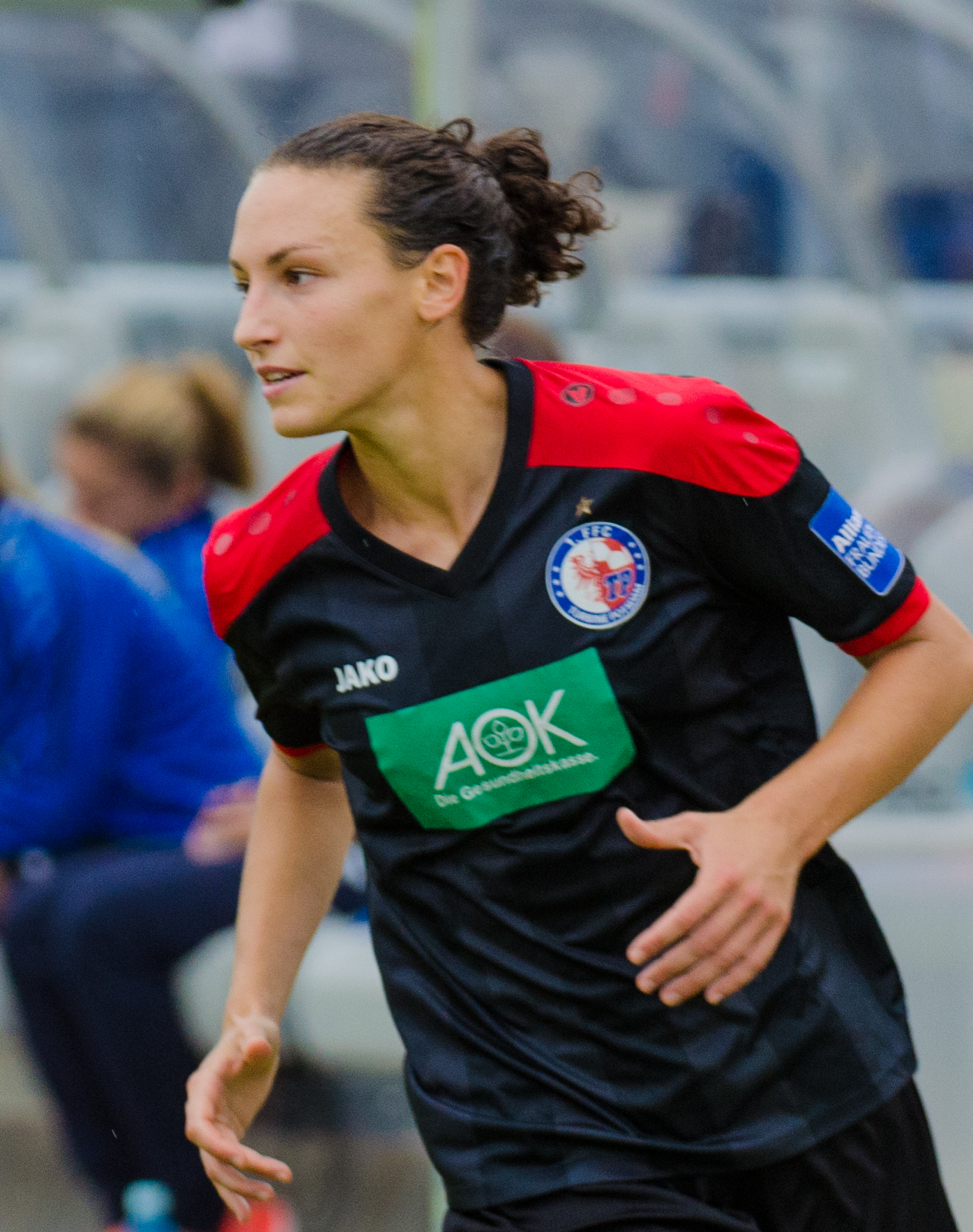
- Mauro playing for Turbine Potsdam in 2015

Personal information
- Date of birth: 22 May 1988 (age 38)
- Place of birth: Gemona del Friuli, Italy
- Height: 1.73 m (5 ft 8 in)
- Position: Forward

Youth career
- UPC Tavagnacco

Senior career*
Years	Team	Apps	(Gls)
2006–2013	UPC Tavagnacco	133	(67)
2013–2015	SC Sand	41	(32)
2015–2016	1. FFC Turbine Potsdam	14	(2)
2016–2020	Fiorentina	75	(43)
2020–2021	Inter Milan	12	(2)

International career
2008–2019	Italy	49	(15)
- * Club domestic league appearances and goals

Ilaria Mauro (born 22 May 1988) is an Italian former footballer who played as a forward. She also played for the Italy national team.

== Club career ==
Mauro spent the first part of her career with UPC Tavagnacco in the Serie A. Following 12 seasons with Tavagnacco, Mauro decided to move abroad in 2013. She signed for SC Sand of the 2. Frauen-Bundesliga. Two years later she joined 1. FFC Turbine Potsdam of the Frauen-Bundesliga.

In 2016, she returned to Italy when joining Fiorentina.

== International career ==
Mauro made her debut for the Italy senior national team on 10 March 2008, in a 2–0 win over China at the 2008 edition of the Algarve Cup in Loulé. Her first goal for Italy came against Denmark at UEFA Women's Euro 2013.

Mauro was called up to the Italy squad for the UEFA Women's Euro 2017.

Mauro was called up to the Italy squad for the 2019 FIFA Women's World Cup.

== Career statistics ==
Goals scored for the Italian WNT in official competitions
Competition	Stage	Date	Location	Opponent	Goals	Result	Overall
2013 UEFA Euro	First Stage	3 July 2013	Halmstad	Denmark	1	2–1	1
2015 FIFA World Cup	Qualifiers	20 September 2013	Halmstad	Estonia	1	5–1	1
2017 UEFA Euro	Qualifiers	27 October 2015	Chomutov	Czech Republic	1	3–0	7
2017 UEFA Euro	Qualifiers	2016–04–12	Reggio Emilia	Northern Ireland	1	3–1	7
2017 UEFA Euro	Qualifiers	2016–06–07	Gori	Georgia	1	7–0	7
2017 UEFA Euro	Qualifiers	2016–09–20	Vercelli	Czech Republic	2	3–1	7
2017 UEFA Euro	First Stage	17 July 2017	Rotterdam	Russia	1	1–2	7
2017 UEFA Euro	First Stage	2017–07–21	Tilburg	Germany	1	1–2	7

== International goals ==
No.	Date	Venue	Opponent	Score	Result	Competition
1.	13 July 2013	Örjans Vall, Halmstad, Sweden	Denmark	2–0	2–1	UEFA Women's Euro 2013
2.	20 September 2013	A. Le Coq Arena, Tallinn, Estonia	Estonia	1–0	5–1	2015 FIFA Women's World Cup qualification
3.	27 October 2015	Letní stadion, Chomutov, Czech Republic	Czech Republic	1–0	3–0	UEFA Women's Euro 2017 qualifying
4.	12 April 2016	Mapei Stadium – Città del Tricolore, Reggio Emilia, Italy	Northern Ireland	2–1	3–1	UEFA Women's Euro 2017 qualifying
5.	7 June 2016	Tengiz Burjanadze Stadium, Gori, Georgia	Georgia	5–0	7–0	UEFA Women's Euro 2017 qualifying
6.	20 September 2016	Stadio Silvio Piola, Vercelli, Italy	Czech Republic	1–0	3–1	UEFA Women's Euro 2017 qualifying
7.	20 September 2016	Stadio Silvio Piola, Vercelli, Italy	Czech Republic	2–1	3–1	UEFA Women's Euro 2017 qualifying
8.	11 December 2016	Arena da Amazônia, Manaus, Brazil	Costa Rica	3–0	3–0	2016 International Women's Football Tournament of Manaus
9.	18 December 2016	Arena da Amazônia, Manaus, Brazil	Brazil	1–1	3–5	2016 International Women's Football Tournament of Manaus
10.	17 July 2017	Sparta Stadion Het Kasteel, Rotterdam, Netherlands	Russia	1–2	1–2	UEFA Women's Euro 2017
11.	21 July 2017	Koning Willem II Stadion, Tilburg, Netherlands	Germany	1–1	1–2	UEFA Women's Euro 2017
12.	18 January 2019	Stadio Carlo Castellani, Empoli, Italy	Chile	1–1	2–1	Friendly
13.	22 January 2019	Stadio Dino Manuzzi, Cesena, Italy	Wales	1–0	2–0	Friendly
14.	22 January 2019	Stadio Dino Manuzzi, Cesena, Italy	Wales	2–0	2–0	Friendly
15.	27 February 2019	Antonis Papadopoulos Stadium, Larnaca, Cyprus	Mexico	3–0	5–0	2019 Cyprus Women's Cup

== Honours ==
UPC Tavagnacco

- Italian Women's Cup: 2012–13

Fiorentina

- Serie A: 2016–17
- Italian Women's Cup: 2016–17, 2017–18
- Italian Women's Super Cup: 2018

Individual

- AIC Best Women's XI: 2019
