= Melania Gabbiadini =

Italian footballer (born 1983)

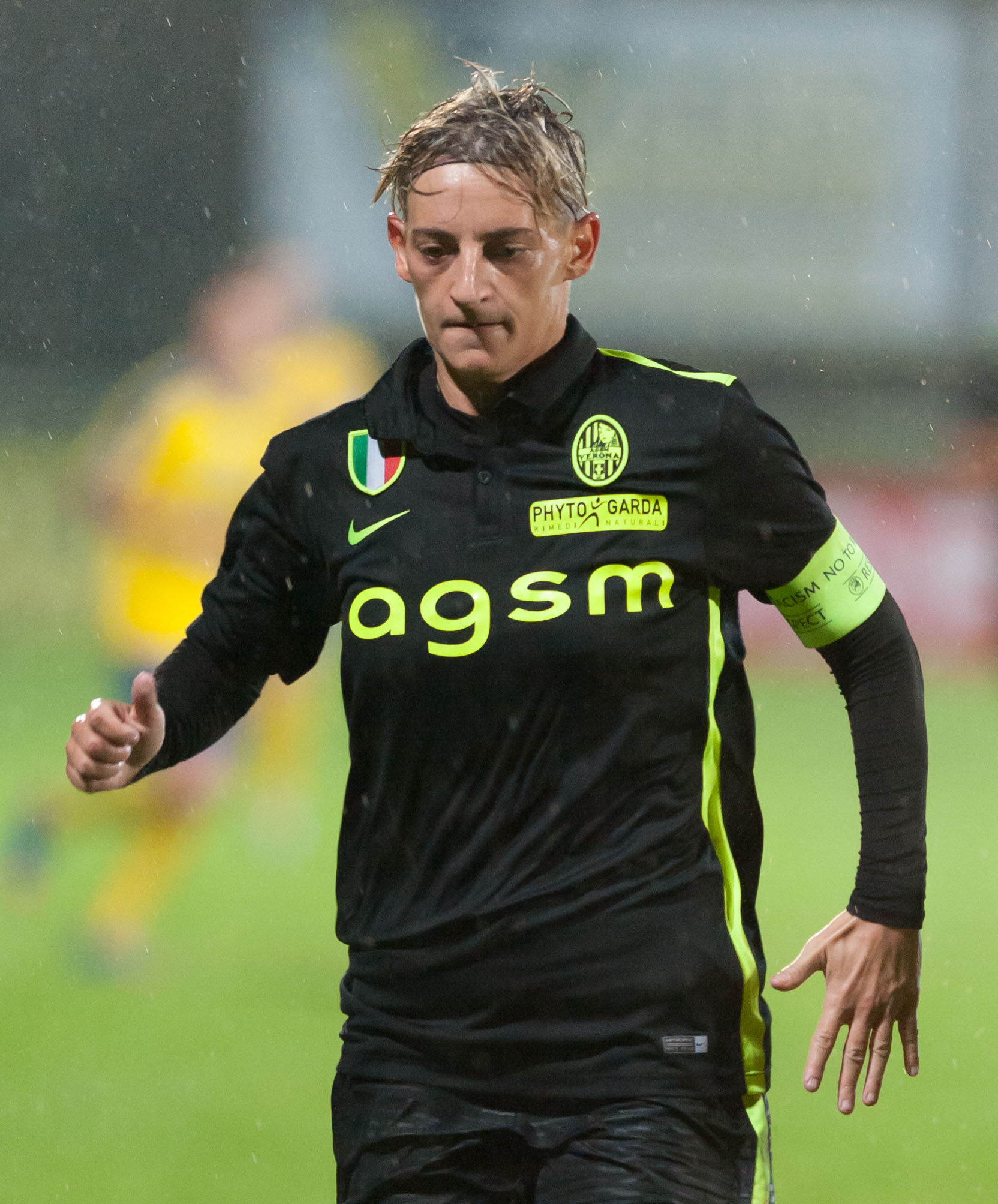
- Gabbiadini with AGSM Verona in 2015

Personal information
- Full name: Melania Gabbiadini
- Date of birth: 28 August 1983 (age 43)
- Place of birth: Calcinate, Italy
- Height: 1.63 m (5 ft 4 in)
- Position: Forward

Youth career
- Bolgare

Senior career*
Years	Team	Apps	(Gls)
2000–2004	Bergamo	146	(150)
2004–2017	AGSM Verona	150	(153)

International career^{‡}
2003–2017	Italy	114	(45)
- * Club domestic league appearances and goals as of 25 July 2017 ‡ National team caps and goals as of 25 July 2017

Melania Gabbiadini (born 28 August 1983) is an Italian former football forward. After beginning her career with Bergamo in 2000, she later joined AGSM Verona in 2004 and went on to captain the team, until her retirement in 2017. She won five Scudetti with the club.

Gabbiadini was an experienced player at international level who made over 100 caps for the Italy women's national football team. She is a veteran of Italy's 2005, 2009, 2013 and 2017 UEFA Women's Championship campaigns, being voted to the Squad of the Tournament in the 2013 edition of the tournament. She was voted the Serie A Female Footballer of the Year in 2012, 2013, 2014, and 2015, and was inducted into the Italian Football Hall of Fame in 2016.

== Club career ==
Gabbiadini began her career with Bergamo in 2000, winning the Serie B title with the club in 2002. After the club's bankruptcy in 2004, she moved to AGSM Verona, the club with which she remained until her retirement in 2017. With Bardolino Verona, she won the Serie A title during the 2004–05, 2006–07, 2007–08, 2008–09, and 2014–15 seasons, as well as the Coppa Italia during the 2005–06, and 2006–07 seasons, and the Supercoppa italiana in 2005, 2007, and 2008; she was also voted the Serie A Female Footballer of the Year in 2012, 2013, 2014, and 2015. With Verona, she also reached the semi-finals of the 2007–08 UEFA Women's Cup.

== International career ==
After representing her country at under-21 level on 5 occasions, Gabbiadini made her senior debut for Italy on 16 April 2003, in a 5–0 away friendly win over the Netherlands. Included in the squad for UEFA Women's Euro 2005 in North West England, she scored twice in a 5–3 defeat to Norway as Italy made a group stage exit.

At UEFA Women's Euro 2009 in Finland, Gabbiadini played in all four games and scored in a 2–0 win over Russia as the Italians reached the quarter-finals. Four years later, national coach Antonio Cabrini named Gabbiadini in his selection for UEFA Women's Euro 2013 in Sweden. After scoring two goals in the group stage against Denmark and hosts Sweden, she played the entire match in the Italians' 1–0 quarter-final defeat to perennial champions Germany. She was voted to the Squad of the Tournament for her performances.

On 16 February 2016, ahead of the 2016 UEFA Women's Champions League Final media launch held in Reggio Emilia, she was awarded a commemorative cap and medal by UEFA for having obtained over 100 caps for the Italian national team. In November 2016, she was included in Italy's squad for the 2016 International Women's Football Tournament of Manaus, which was held from 7 to 18 December.

She retired after the UEFA Women's Euro 2017. However, she finished her international career with 114 appearances and 45 goals.

Goals scored in official competitions
Competition	Stage	Date	Location	Opponent	Goals	Result
(England) 2005 UEFA Euro	Qualifiers	2004–09–25	Niš	Serbia and Montenegro	1–0	2–1
(England) 2005 UEFA Euro	First Stage	2005–06–12	Preston	Norway	1–1 2–4	3–5
(Finland) 2009 UEFA Euro	Qualifiers	2007–10–31	Parma	Romania	5–0	5–0
(Finland) 2009 UEFA Euro	Qualifiers	2008–02–16	Villacidro	Republic of Ireland	2–1	4–1
(Finland) 2009 UEFA Euro	Qualifiers	2008–05–24	Buftea	Romania	1–0 5–1	6–1
(Finland) 2009 UEFA Euro	First Stage	2009–08–31	Helsinki	Russia	1–0	2–0
(Germany) 2011 World Cup	Qualifiers	2009–09–19	Domžale	Slovenia	3–0 4–0	8–0
(Germany) 2011 World Cup	Qualifiers	2009–11–25	Francavilla	Armenia	3–0 6–0	7–0
(Germany) 2011 World Cup	Qualifiers	2010–03–31	Ascoli	Finland	1–1	1–1
(Germany) 2011 World Cup	Qualifiers	2010–06–19	Montereale	Slovenia	1–0	6–0
(Germany) 2011 World Cup	Qualifiers	2010–06–23	Vantaa	Finland	2–1	3–1
(Sweden) 2013 UEFA Euro	Qualifiers	2011–10–22	Prilep	North Macedonia	7–0	9–0
(Sweden) 2013 UEFA Euro	Qualifiers	2011–11–19	Pruszków	Poland	1–0 2–0 5–0	6–1
(Sweden) 2013 UEFA Euro	Qualifiers	2011–11–23	Trani	Greece	1–0	2–0
(Sweden) 2013 UEFA Euro	First Stage	2013–07–13	Halmstad	Denmark	1–0	2–1
(Sweden) 2013 UEFA Euro	First Stage	2013–07–16	Halmstad	Sweden	1–3	1–3
(Canada) 2015 World Cup	Qualifiers	2013–09–20	Tallinn	Estonia	2–0 4–0	5–0
(Canada) 2015 World Cup	Qualifiers	2014–02–13	Novara	Czech Republic	1–0 2–0	6–1
(Canada) 2015 World Cup	Qualifiers	2014–04–10	Cluj	Romania	2–0	2–1
(Canada) 2015 World Cup	Qualifiers	2014–05–08	Skopje	North Macedonia	5–0 7–0	11–0
(Canada) 2015 World Cup	Qualifiers	2014–06–14	Prague	Czech Republic	3–0	4–0
(Canada) 2015 World Cup	Qualifiers	2014–10–25	Rieti	Ukraine	2–1	2–1
(Canada) 2015 World Cup	Qualifiers	2014–10–29	Lviv	Ukraine	1–2	2–2
(Canada) 2015 World Cup	Qualifiers	2014–11–22	The Hague	Netherlands	1–0	1–1
(Netherlands) 2017 UEFA Euro	Qualifiers	2016–09–16	Lurgan	Northern Ireland	2–0	3–0

== Style of play ==
A quick forward and a prolific goalscorer, Gabbiadini was known for her technical ability and her pace on the ball, and was often deployed as a winger or as a main striker. She also stood out for her leadership and work-rate throughout her career.

== Personal life ==
As well as being a footballer, Gabbiadini is a tattoo designer. Her younger brother Manolo represented the Italy men's national team.

Gabbiadini's participation at UEFA Women's Euro 2017 was widely noted by Dutch viewers due to her striking resemblance to former professional footballer Wim Kieft, who coincidentally played in the Italian Serie A around the time of her conception. Television show Voetbal Inside mentioned this and jokingly questioned whether he would be her actual father.

== Honours ==
=== Club ===
AGSM Verona

- Serie A: 2004–05, 2006–07, 2007–08, 2008–09, 2014–15
- Coppa Italia: 2005–06, 2006–07
- Supercoppa italiana: 2005, 2007, 2008

Bergamo

- Serie B: 2001–02

=== Individual ===
- Serie A Female Footballer of the Year: 2012, 2013, 2014, 2015
- UEFA Women's Euro 2013 Squad of the Tournament
- Italian Football Hall of Fame: 2016
- Pallone Azzurro: 2016
