= Laura Feiersinger =

Austrian footballer (born 1993)

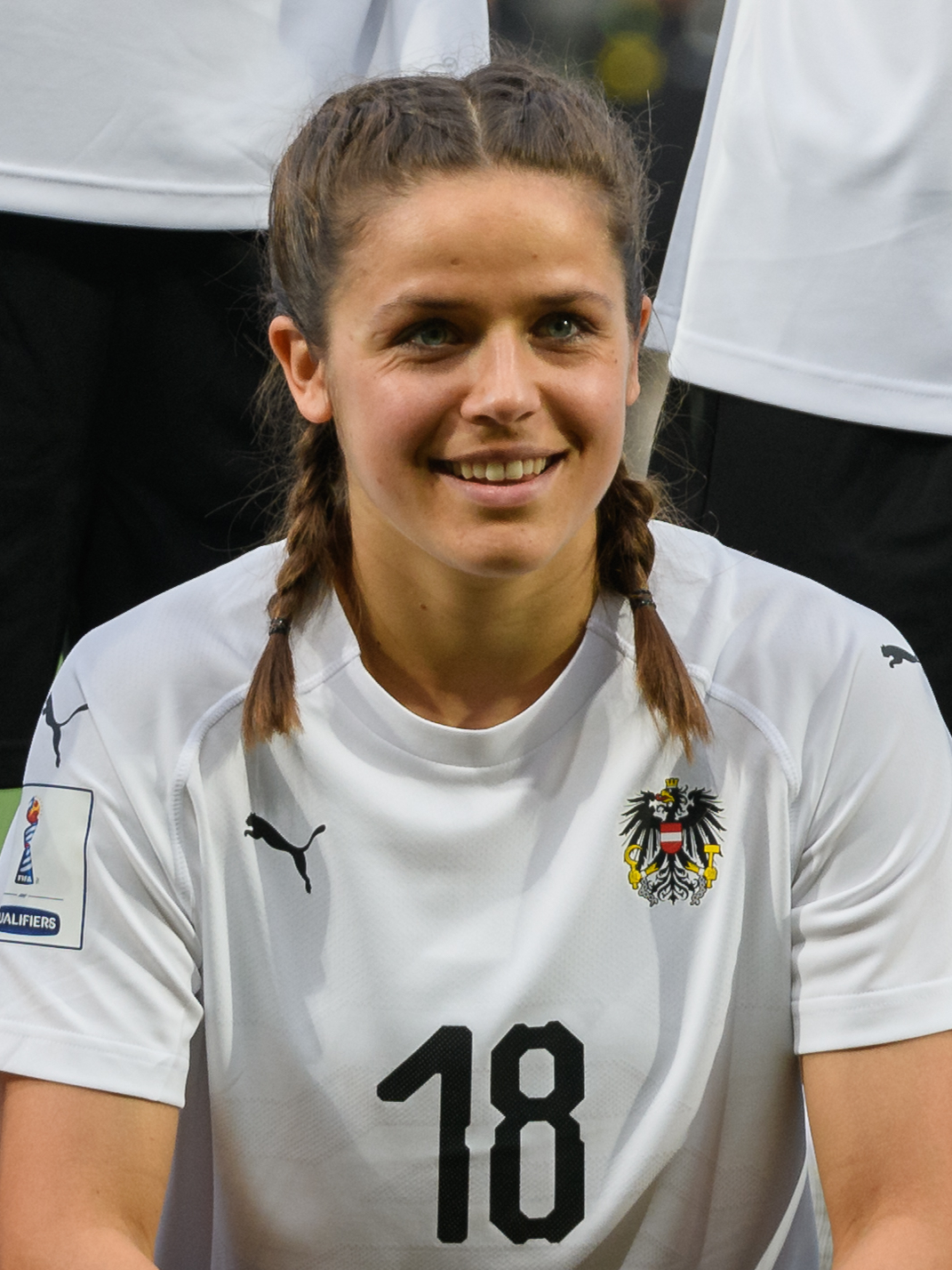
- Laura Feiersinger in 2018

Personal information
- Date of birth: 5 April 1993 (age 33)
- Place of birth: Saalfelden, Austria
- Height: 1.65 m (5 ft 5 in)
- Position: Midfielder

Team information
- Current team: 1. FC Köln
- Number: 27

Youth career
- 2001: SV Oftering
- 2001–2008: 1. Sallfeldner SK
- 2007–2008: FC Pinzgau Saalfelden

Senior career*
Years	Team	Apps	(Gls)
2008–2010	USK Hof	36	(9)
2010–2011	Herforder SV	18	(7)
2011–2016	Bayern Munich	62	(3)
2014–2016	Bayern Munich II	8	(4)
2016–2018	SC Sand	39	(5)
2018–2023	Eintracht Frankfurt	64	(19)
2023–2024	AS Roma	23	(4)
2024-	1. FC Köln	55	(1)

International career^{‡}
2010–2025	Austria	125	(20)
- * Club domestic league appearances and goals as of 21 November 2026 ‡ National team caps and goals as of 20 May 2025

Laura Feiersinger (born 5 April 1993) is an Austrian professional footballer who plays as a midfielder for Frauen-Bundesliga club 1. FC Köln. She represented the Austria national team from 2010 until 2025, earning 126 caps (the fourth-most in history) and scoring 19 goals.

== Club career ==
=== USK Hof, 2008–2010 ===
Feiersinger starter her senior career with USK Hof in the ÖFB-Frauenliga, the Austrian league. She spent two years at the club, playing in 36 regular season games and scoring 9 goals.

=== Herforder SV, 2010–2011 ===
Feiersinger was recruited and signed for Herforder SV who then played in the Frauen-Bundesliga, the top flight of German Football. This move required her to leave her homeland aged 18. While playing for Herforder, she made 18 regular season appearances, scoring seven goals. Feiersinger left the club after they were relegated to the 2. Frauen-Bundesliga.

=== Bayern Munich, 2011–2016 ===
Feiersinger signed for Bundesliga side FC Bayern Munich in 2011. During her first year at the club she won the DFB Pokal, Germany's second-most important title in women's football. In March 2014, she suffered a serious injury, breaking her shin and fibula. However, she was able to get her contract with the club renewed in 2015. She went on to win back-to-back Frauen Bundesliga titles in 2014–2015 and 2015–2016. At the time of her departure in 2016, Feiersinger had made 62 regular season appearances for the Bavarians.

=== SC Sand, 2016–2018 ===
Feiersinger moved to SC Sand ahead of the 2016–2017 season in order to get more regular playing time. During her first season with the club she was runner-up for the 2016–17 DFB-Pokal Frauen. Laura left SC Sand after two seasons, in which she made 39 regular season appearances and scored five goals.

=== FFC Frankfurt, 2018–2023 ===
Feiersinger signed for Bundesliga side 1. FFC Frankfurt ahead of their 2018–2019 season on a two-year contract. During her first year with the club she made 21 appearances, scoring 10 goals.

On 26 May 2023, Frankfurt announced that Feiersinger had chosen to terminate her contract and would leave the club in the summer in order to "pursue a fresh challenge" at the age of 30. In total, she spent five years at the club, making over 100 appearances in all competitions and scoring 23 goals.

=== AS Roma, 2023–2024 ===
On 28 June 2023, Feiersinger signed with Italian club AS Roma on a two-year contract. She won the Italian double (Serie A and Coppa Italia) with the team during the 2023–2024 campaign.

=== 1. FC Köln, 2024- ===
On 1 June 2024, Feiersinger sealed a return to German football by signing with Bundesliga side 1. FC Köln on a deal until 2026.

== International career ==
She has been a member of the Austrian national team since 2010. With Austria she won the 2016 Cyprus Cup. She was part of the squad which qualified and went to their first major tournament, the UEFA Women's Euro 2017 in the Netherlands. The team did exceptionally well, reaching the semi-finals which it lost to Denmark on penalty shots. Feiersinger played every single minute of the tournament for Austria.

Feiersinger was part of the squad that was called up to the UEFA Women's Euro 2022. An absolute mainstay of the team, Laura earned her 100th cap for Austria in November 2022. On 29 October 2025, Feiersinger announced her retirement from international football after 19 goals and 126 caps. As of December 2025, she is the nation's fourth-most capped player and joint fourth-highest goalscorer of all time.

== Personal life ==
Feiersinger is from Saalfelden. When Feiersinger was younger she tried a variety of sports including biathlon, athletics, cross country and football. She entered the Austrian sports school model (SSM) and at age 15 decided to specialize as a footballer. Wolfgang Feiersinger, her father, is a former footballer who won the champions league playing for Borussia Dortmund and also played for the Austrian national team. Feiersinger also pursued a bachelor's degree in sports science. In 2023, Feiersinger and her sister Denise Feiersinger launched a fashion brand together. As of 2024, Feiersinger is believed to be in a relationship with English footballer Keira Walsh.

=== We Play Strong ===
Feiersinger is one of UEFA's official ambassadors for #WePlayStrong, a social media and vlogging campaign which was launched in 2018. The campaign's "...aim is to promote women’s football as much as we can and to make people aware of women’s football, really,” Lisa Evans, another participant explains. “The ultimate goal is to make football the most played sport by females by 2020. So it’s a UEFA initiative to get more women and girls playing football, whether they want to be professional or not.” The series, which also originally included professional footballers Sarah Zadrazil, Eunice Beckmann, Lisa Evans and now also includes Petronella Ekroth and Shanice van de Sanden, follows the daily lives of female professional footballers.

== Career statistics ==
Scores and results list Austria's goal tally first, score column indicates score after each Feiersinger goal.

List of international goals scored by Laura Feiersinger
No.	Date	Venue	Opponent	Score	Result	Competition
1	23 June 2010	Anger Stadium, Anger, Austria	Turkey	3–0	4–0	2011 FIFA Women's World Cup qualifying
2	26 October 2011	Murinselstadion, Bruck an der Mur, Austria	Armenia	1–0	3–0	UEFA Women's Euro 2013 qualifying
3	19 November 2011	Estádio Municipal de Pombal, Pombal, Portugal	Portugal	1–0	1–0	UEFA Women's Euro 2013 qualifying
4	5 April 2012	Stadion Wiener Neustadt, Wiener Neustadt, Austria	Portugal	1–0	1–0	UEFA Women's Euro 2013 qualifying
5	21 September 2013	Voralpenstadion, Vöcklabruck, Austria	Bulgaria	2–0	4–0	2015 FIFA Women's World Cup qualifying
6	2 June 2016	Ullevaal Stadion, Oslo, Norway	Norway	2–2	2–2	UEFA Women's Euro 2017 qualifying
7	22 October 2016	Jahnstadion Regensburg, Regensburg, Germany	Germany	1–2	2–4	Friendly
8	2 March 2018	AEK Arena, Larnaca, Cyprus	Czech Republic	1–0	2–0	2018 Cyprus Women's Cup
9	2 March 2018	AEK Arena, Larnaca, Cyprus	Czech Republic	2–0	2–0	2018 Cyprus Women's Cup
10	12 June 2018	Ramat Gan Stadium, Ramat Gan, Israel	Israel	6–0	6–0	2019 FIFA Women's World Cup qualifying
11	27 February 2019	AEK Arena, Larnaca, Cyprus	Nigeria	3–1	4–1	2019 Cyprus Women's Cup
12	3 September 2019	Bundesstadion Südstadt, Maria Enzersdorf, Austria	North Macedonia	1–0	3–0	UEFA Women's Euro 2022 qualifying
13	19 November 2019	Bundesstadion Südstadt, Maria Enzersdorf, Austria	Kazakhstan	3–0	9–0	UEFA Women's Euro 2022 qualifying
14	17 September 2021	Daugava Stadium, Liepāja, Latvia	Latvia	6–1	8–1	2023 FIFA Women's World Cup qualifying
15	23 February 2022	Marbella Football Center, Marbella, Spain	Switzerland	2–0	3–0	Friendly
16	6 September 2022	Stadion Wiener Neustadt, Wiener Neustadt, Austria	North Macedonia	7–0	10–0	2023 FIFA Women's World Cup qualifying
17	6 September 2022	Stadion Wiener Neustadt, Wiener Neustadt, Austria	North Macedonia	10–0	10–0	2023 FIFA Women's World Cup qualifying
18	15 November 2022	Stadion Wiener Neustadt, Wiener Neustadt, Austria	Slovakia	3–0	3–0	Friendly

== Honours ==
Bayern München

- Bundesliga: 2014–15, 2015–16
- DFB-Pokal: 2011–12

AS Roma

- Serie A: 2023–24
- Coppa Italia: 2023–24

Austria

- Cyprus Women's Cup: 2016

Individual

- Austrian Footballer of the Year: 2012

== See also ==
- List of women's footballers with 100 or more international caps
