= Ekroth =

Ekroth is a Swedish surname. Notable people with the surname include:

- Helge Ekroth (1892–1950), Swedish football and bandy player
- Oliver Ekroth (born 1992), Swedish football player
- Petronella Ekroth (born 1989), Swedish football player
