= 2016 Cyprus Women's Cup =

Tournament details
- Host country: Cyprus
- Dates: 2–9 March
- Teams: 8 (from 1 confederation)
- Venues: 3 (in 3 host cities)

Final positions
- Champions: Austria (1st title)
- Runners-up: Poland
- Third place: Italy
- Fourth place: Czech Republic

Tournament statistics
- Matches played: 16
- Goals scored: 35 (2.19 per match)
- Top scorer(s): (Austria) Nina Burger (Czech Republic) Lucie Voňková (3 goals)

The 2016 Cyprus Women's Cup was the ninth edition of the Cyprus Women's Cup, an invitational women's football tournament held annually in Cyprus. After being initially canceled due to schedule conflicts with both UEFA and AFC qualification for the 2016 Summer Olympics and the 2016 SheBelieves Cup leaving many of the prior year's participants, including reigning champions England, unable to attend, the tournament was rescheduled with the Football Association of Finland as tournament organizers and a scaled-down field of eight national teams.

Austria defeated Poland in a final between two first-time participants in the Cyprus Cup.

== Format ==
The tournament consisted of a group stage held over three match days followed by a single day of classification matches to determine the final standings.

For the group stage, the eight teams were split into two groups of four teams. Each group played a round-robin tournament with each team playing one match against each other team in its group.

The classification day then had four matches: a first place match between the group winners, a third place match between the runners-up, a fifth place match between the third-placed teams, and a seventh place match between the bottom teams.

=== Tie-breaking criteria ===
For the group stage of this tournament, where two or more teams in a group tied on an equal number of points, the finishing positions will be determined by the following tie-breaking criteria in the following order:

1. number of points obtained in the matches among the teams in question
2. goal difference in all the group matches
3. number of goals scored in all the group matches
4. drawing of lots

== Venues ==
Stadium	City	Capacity
GSZ Stadium	Larnaca	13,032
Paralimni Stadium	Paralimni	5,800
Anagennisi Stadium	Deryneia	4,500

== Teams ==
Team	FIFA Rankings (December 2015)
Italy	13
Finland	24
Austria	27
Poland	31
Republic of Ireland	32
Czech Republic	33
Wales	36
Hungary	42

For the first time in Cyprus Cup history, all participants were from UEFA. Austria, Hungary, Poland, and Wales all made their first appearance in the tournament. Also for the first time, Finland was named "host nation" as the Football Association of Finland organized the tournament. Prior co-organisers the Netherlands were instead hosting the 2016 UEFA Women's Olympic Qualifying Tournament, England instead competed in the 2016 SheBelieves Cup, and Scotland were controversially kept away by their performance director Brian McClair, who preferred to play a single friendly against Spain in Falkirk.

== Group stage ==
=== Group A ===
Team	Pld	W	D	L	GF	GA	GD	Pts
Austria	3	2	1	0	4	1	+3	7
Italy	3	1	2	0	3	1	+2	5
Hungary	3	1	0	2	2	4	−2	3
Republic of Ireland	3	0	1	2	1	4	−3	1

2 March 2016
14:30

Austria	2–0	Republic of Ireland
Burger 20', 54'	Report

Anagennisi Stadium, Deryneia
2 March 2016
17:30

Hungary	0–2	Italy
	Report	Gabbiadini 13'; Sabatino 24'

Anagennisi Stadium, Deryneia

4 March 2016
14:30

Austria	2–1	Hungary
Zadrazil 49'; Billa 78'	Report	Zágor 66'

GSZ Stadium, Larnaca
4 March 2016
17:30

Italy	1–1	Republic of Ireland
Carissimi 85'	Report	McCabe 90'

GSZ Stadium, Larnaca

7 March 2016
14:30

Italy	0–0	Austria
	Report

GSZ Stadium, Larnaca
7 March 2016
17:30

Republic of Ireland	0–1	Hungary
	Report	Szabó 76'

Paralimni Stadium, Paralimni

=== Group B ===
Team	Pld	W	D	L	GF	GA	GD	Pts
Poland	3	2	1	0	3	1	+2	7
Czech Republic	3	2	0	1	4	2	+2	6
Wales	3	0	2	1	3	4	−1	2
Finland	3	0	1	2	3	6	−3	1

2 March 2016
14:30

Wales	2–2	Finland
Green 34'; Chivers 87'	Report	Engman 11'; Saari 62'

GSZ Stadium, Larnaca
2 March 2016
17:30

Poland	1–0	Czech Republic
Chojnowski 76'	Report

GSZ Stadium, Larnaca

4 March 2016
14:30

Wales	1–1	Poland
Ward 24'	Report	Pajor 31'

Paralimni Stadium, Paralimni
4 March 2016
17:30

Finland	1–3	Czech Republic
Danielsson 60'	Report	Necidová 2'; Voňková 10', 18'

Paralimni Stadium, Paralimni

7 March 2016
14:30

Finland	0–1	Poland
	Report	Wiankowska 22'

GSZ Stadium, Larnaca
7 March 2016
14:30

Czech Republic	1–0	Wales
Necidová 88'	report

Paralimni Stadium, Paralimni

== Knockout stage ==
=== Seventh place match ===
9 March 2016
11:00

Republic of Ireland	2–0	Finland
Littlejohn 3' (pen.); Quinn 13'	Report

Paralimni Stadium, Paralimni

=== Fifth place match ===
9 March 2016
14:00

Hungary	2–1	Wales
Csiszár 26'; Vágó 90+1'	Report	Estcourt 75'

Paralimni Stadium, Paralimni

=== Third place match ===
9 March 2016
14:00

Italy	3–1	Czech Republic
Guagni 63'; Bonansea 89'; Girelli 90+2'	Report	Voňková 45' (pen.)

GSZ Stadium, Larnaca

=== Final ===
9 March 2016
17:00

Austria	2–1	Poland
Burger 11'; Schiechtl 89'	Report	Kamczyk 3'

GSZ Stadium, Larnaca

== Final standings ==
Rank	Team
1st place, gold medalist(s)	Austria
2nd place, silver medalist(s)	Poland
3rd place, bronze medalist(s)	Italy
4	Czech Republic
5	Hungary
6	Wales
7	Republic of Ireland
8	Finland

== Goalscorers ==
3 goals

- (Austria) Nina Burger
- (Czech Republic) Lucie Voňková

2 goals

- (Czech Republic) Simona Necidová

1 goal

- (Austria) Nicole Billa
- (Austria) Katharina Schiechtl
- (Austria) Sarah Zadrazil
- (Finland) Jenny Danielsson
- (Finland) Adelina Engman
- (Finland) Maija Saari
- (Hungary) Henrietta Csiszár
- (Hungary) Viktória Szabó
- (Hungary) Fanny Vágó
- (Hungary) Bernadett Zágor
- (Italy) Barbara Bonansea
- (Italy) Marta Carissimi
- (Italy) Melania Gabbiadini
- (Italy) Cristiana Girelli
- (Italy) Alia Guagni
- (Italy) Daniela Sabatino
- (Poland) Silvana Chojnowski
- (Poland) Ewelina Kamczyk
- (Poland) Ewa Pajor
- (Poland) Martyna Wiankowska
- (Republic of Ireland) Ruesha Littlejohn
- (Republic of Ireland) Katie McCabe
- (Republic of Ireland) Louise Quinn
- (Wales) Chloe Chivers
- (Wales) Charlie Estcourt
- (Wales) Kayleigh Green
- (Wales) Helen Ward
