= Viktória Szabó =

Hungarian footballer (born 1997)

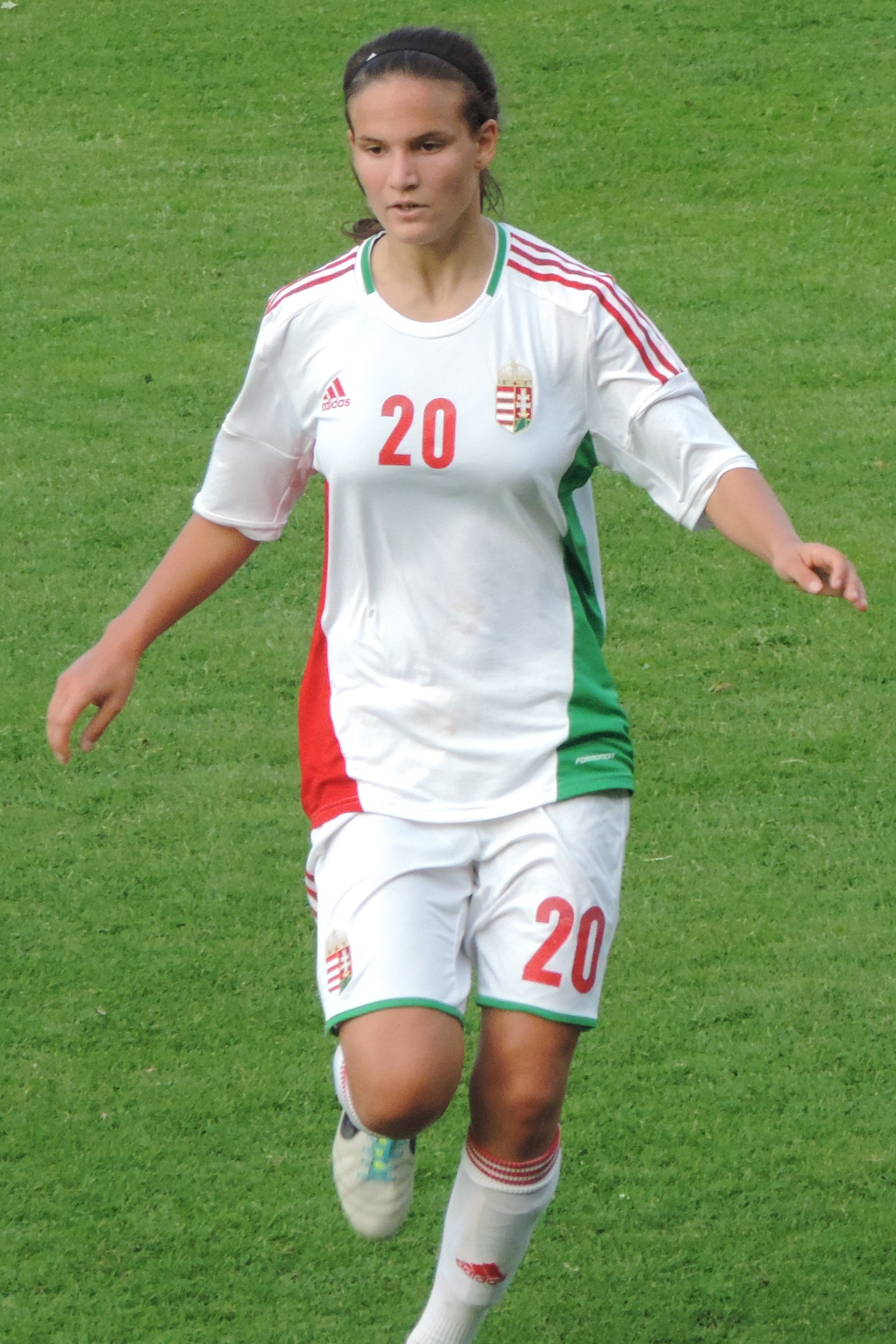
- Szabó playing for Hungary in 2013

Personal information
- Full name: Viktória Szabó
- Date of birth: 26 May 1997 (age 29)
- Place of birth: Budapest, Hungary
- Height: 1.70 m (5 ft 7 in)
- Position: Midfielder

Team information
- Current team: Como
- Number: 18

Youth career
- 2004–2007: Angyalföldi SI
- 2007–2012: Vasas SC

Senior career*
Years	Team	Apps	(Gls)
2012–2015	Ferencvárosi		
2015–2016	1. FC Lübars	21	(6)
2016–2017	1. FC Saarbrücken	20	(1)
2017–2024	Ferencvárosi		
2024–2025	Zürich	32	(2)
2025–	Como	3	(0)

International career^{‡}
2013–	Hungary	70	(3)
- * Club domestic league appearances and goals as of 29 October 2025 ‡ National team caps and goals as of 10 March 2020

Viktória Szabó (born 26 May 1997) is a Hungarian football midfielder who plays for Serie A Femminile club Como and the Hungary national team.

== Club career ==
In July 2016 Szabó joined 2. Bundesliga club Saarbrücken from 1. FC Lübars.

== International career ==
At the 2016 Cyprus Cup, Szabó scored Hungary's winning goal against the Republic of Ireland from a direct free kick.
