= Shanice van de Sanden =

Dutch footballer (born 1992)

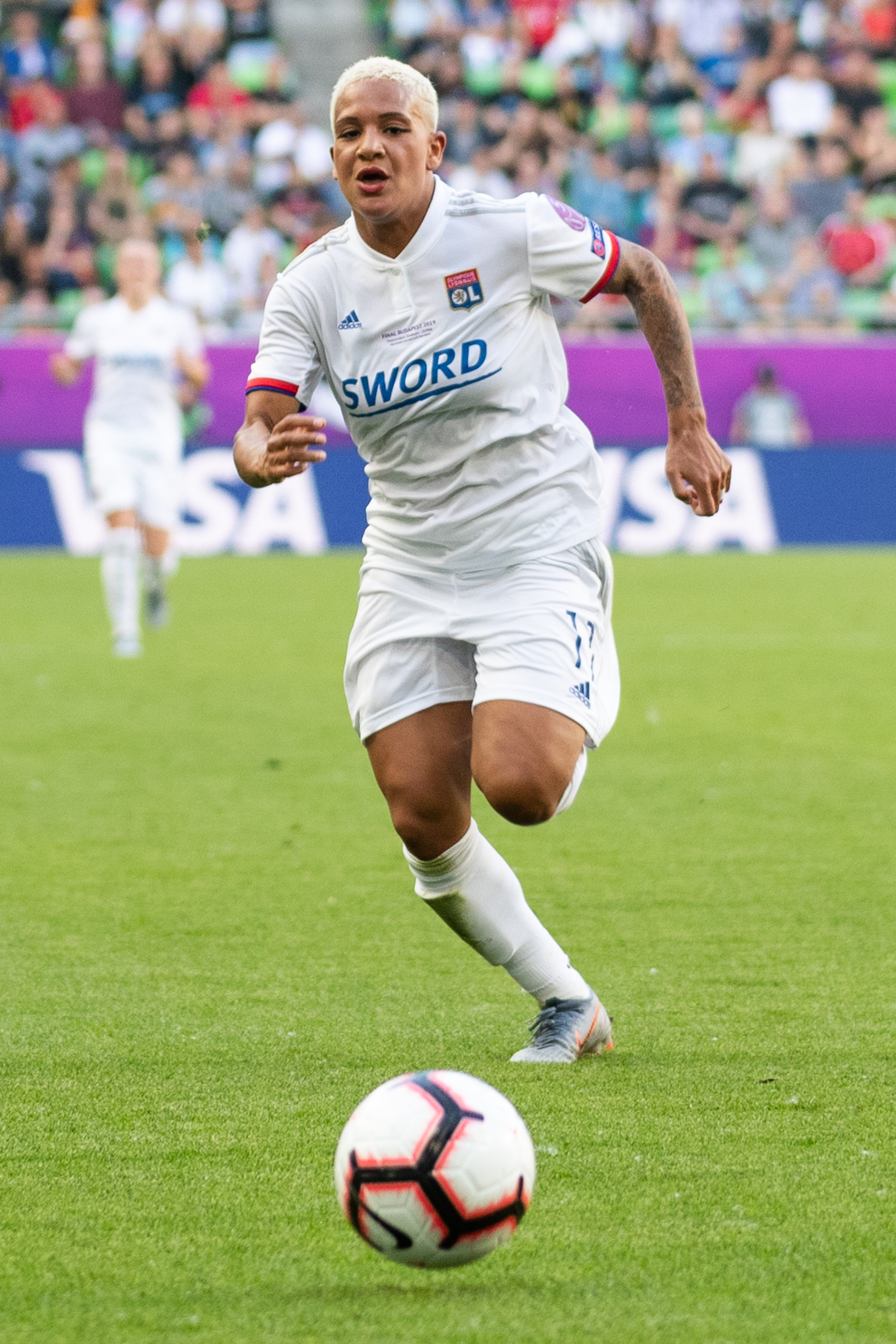
- Van de Sanden with Lyon in 2019

Personal information
- Full name: Shanice Janice van de Sanden
- Date of birth: 2 October 1992 (age 34)
- Place of birth: Utrecht, Netherlands
- Height: 1.68 m (5 ft 6 in)
- Position: Forward

Team information
- Current team: PSV
- Number: 21

Youth career
- 2006–2008: VVIJ
- 2008: SV Saestum

Senior career*
Years	Team	Apps	(Gls)
2008–2010	Utrecht	30	(5)
2010–2011	Heerenveen	21	(8)
2011–2016	Twente	103	(32)
2016–2017	Liverpool	23	(3)
2017–2020	Lyon	47	(11)
2020–2022	VfL Wolfsburg	25	(4)
2021–2022	VfL Wolfsburg II	6	(1)
2022–2024	Liverpool	24	(2)
2024	Pachuca	12	(1)
2025	Toluca	17	(7)
2026–	PSV	2	(0)

International career^{‡}
2008	Netherlands U17	4	(1)
2008–2011	Netherlands U19	27	(9)
2008–	Netherlands	97	(21)
Medal record
Women's football
Representing the Netherlands
FIFA Women's World Cup
Runner-up	2019 France
UEFA Women's Championship
Winner	2017 Netherlands
- * Club domestic league appearances and goals as of 17:07, 24 May 2024 (UTC) ‡ National team caps and goals as of 17:07, 24 May 2024 (UTC)

Shanice Janice van de Sanden (born 2 October 1992) is a Dutch professional footballer who plays as a forward for Eredivisie club PSV and the Netherlands national team.

== Club career ==
Her career started at amateur club VVIJ in IJsselstein, before moving to FC Utrecht in 2008 where she also played for its farm team SV Saestum.

In May 2010, she moved to SC Heerenveen, where she played for one season before joining FC Twente in May 2011.

After four and a half seasons at FC Twente, she signed with Liverpool of the English WSL1 on 4 February 2016.

On 29 August 2017, after two seasons at Liverpool where she played a total of 28 matches (in all competitions), she moved to France and joined Division 1 Féminine club Olympique Lyonnais.

In September 2020 it was announced that Van de Sanden would be moving to Germany to play for Wolfsburg with immediate effect.

On 16 July 2022, Van de Sanden rejoined Liverpool.

== International career ==
Aged 16, she made her debut for the senior Netherlands women's national football team on 14 December 2008 in a friendly match 2–0 win over France. She was part of the Dutch squad in the UEFA Women's Euro 2009 and the 2015 FIFA Women's World Cup.

In June 2017, she was in the 23 players squad which won the UEFA Women's Euro 2017. After the tournament, the whole team was honoured by the Prime Minister Mark Rutte and Minister of Sport Edith Schippers and made Knights of the Order of Orange-Nassau.

Later that year, she was shortlisted for the UEFA Women's Player of the Year Award.

Van de Sanden was selected in the final squad for the 2019 FIFA Women's World Cup in France.

On 31 May 2023, she was named as part of the Netherlands provisional squad for the 2023 FIFA Women's World Cup.

== Career statistics ==
=== Club ===
As of match played 18 April 2024

Appearances and goals by club, season and competition
Club	Season	League			National Cup (Note: Includes KNVB Women's Cup, Coupe de France, Women's FA Cup, DFB-Pokal)		League Cup (Note: Includes FA Women's League Cup)		Continental (Note: Includes UEFA Women's Champions League)		Total	
Club	Season	Division	Apps	Goals	Apps	Goals	Apps	Goals	Apps	Goals	Apps	Goals
Utrecht	2008–09	Eredivisie	15	4	?	?	—		—		15	4
Utrecht	2009–10	Eredivisie	15	1	?	?	—		—		15	1
Utrecht	Total		30	5	?	?	—		—		30	5
Heerenveen	2010–11	Eredivisie	21	8	?	?	—		—		21	8
Twente	2011–12	Eredivisie	17	3	?	?	—		1	0	18	3
Twente	2012–13	BeNe League	25	4	?	?	—		—		25	4
Twente	2013–14	BeNe League	25	11	?	?	—		4	1	29	12
Twente	2014–15	BeNe League	24	6	?	?	—		2	0	26	6
Twente	2015–16	Eredivisie	12	8	?	?	—		7	2	19	10
Twente	Total		103	32	?	?	—		14	3	117	35
Liverpool	2016	Women's Super League	16	3	0	0	2	0	—		18	3
Liverpool	2017	Women's Super League	7	0	3	1	—		—		10	1
Liverpool	Total		23	3	3	1	2	0	—		28	4
Lyon	2017–18	D1 Féminine	16	2	2	0	—		5	0	23	2
Lyon	2018–19	D1 Féminine	19	7	5	1	—		7	0	31	8
Lyon	2019–20	D1 Féminine	11	2	2	0	—		3	0	16	2
Lyon	2020–21	D1 Féminine	1	0	0	0	—		0	0	1	0
Lyon	Total		47	11	9	1	—		15	0	71	12
Wolfsburg	2020–21	Frauen-Bundesliga	15	2	2	1	—		2	1	19	4
Wolfsburg	2021–22	Frauen-Bundesliga	10	2	1	0	—		4	0	15	2
Wolfsburg	Total		25	4	3	1	—		6	1	34	6
Liverpool	2022–23	Women's Super League	14	1	0	0	1	0	—		15	1
Liverpool	2023–24	Women's Super League	10	1	2	0	2	0	—		14	1
Liverpool	Total		24	2	2	0	3	0	—		29	2
Career Total			273	65	17	3	5	0	35	4	330	72

=== International ===
As of match played 28 February 2024

Appearances and goals by national team and year
National team	Year	Apps	Goals
Netherlands	2008	1	0
Netherlands	2009	9	2
Netherlands	2010	4	0
Netherlands	2015	5	1
Netherlands	2016	13	6
Netherlands	2017	17	1
Netherlands	2018	11	4
Netherlands	2019	15	4
Netherlands	2020	7	0
Netherlands	2021	13	3
Netherlands	2023	1	0
Netherlands	2024	1	0
Total		97	21

Scores and results list Netherlands's goal tally first, score column indicates score after each van de Sanden goal.

List of international goals scored by Shanice van de Sanden
No.	Date	Venue	Opponent	Score	Result	Competition
1	12 March 2009	GSP Stadium, Nicosia, Cyprus	South Africa	4–0	5–0	2009 Cyprus Women's Cup
2	13 July 2009	Olympic Stadium, Amsterdam, Netherlands	South Africa	3–2	3–2	Four Nations Cup
3	20 May 2015	Sparta Stadion, Rotterdam, Netherlands	Estonia	5–0	7–0	Friendly
4	22 January 2016	Limak Arcadia Atlantis Football Center, Belek, Turkey	Denmark	2–0	2–0	Friendly
5	2 March 2016	Kyocera Stadion, The Hague, Netherlands	Switzerland	4–1	4–3	2016 Women's Olympic Qualifier
6	7 April 2016	Telstar Stadium, Velsen-Zuid, Netherlands	New Zealand	1–0	2–0	Friendly
7	7 April 2016	Telstar Stadium, Velsen-Zuid, Netherlands	New Zealand	2–0	2–0	Friendly
8	17 September 2016	Georgia Dome, Atlanta, United States	United States	1–0	1–3	Friendly
9	20 October 2016	Tony Macaroni Arena, Livingston, Scotland	Scotland	6–0	7–0	Friendly
10	16 July 2017	Stadion Galgenwaard, Utrecht, Netherlands	Norway	1–0	1–0	UEFA Women's Euro 2017
11	28 February 2018	Bela Vista Municipal Stadium, Parchal, Portugal	Japan	4–0	6–2	2018 Algarve Cup
12	6 April 2018	Philips Stadion, Eindhoven, Netherlands	Northern Ireland	5–0	7–0	2019 FIFA Women's World Cup qualification
13	8 June 2018	Shamrock Park, Portadown, Northern Ireland	Northern Ireland	3–0	5–0	2019 FIFA Women's World Cup qualification
14	5 September 2018	Rat Verlegh Stadion, Breda, Netherlands	Denmark	2–0	2–0	2019 FIFA World Cup qualifier – Play-off SF
15	9 April 2019	AFAS Stadion, Alkmaar, Netherlands	Chile	6–0	7–0	Friendly
16	1 June 2019	Philips Stadion, Eindhoven, Netherlands	Australia	1–0	3–0	Friendly
17	1 June 2019	Philips Stadion, Eindhoven, Netherlands	Australia	3–0	3–0	Friendly
18	8 November 2019	Bornova Stadium, İzmir, Turkey	Turkey	1–0	8–0	2021 UEFA Women's Euro qualification
19	15 June 2021	De Grolsch Veste, Enschede, Netherlands	Norway	6–0	7–0	Friendly
20	21 July 2021	Miyagi Stadium, Rifu, Japan	Zambia	6–1	10–3	2020 Olympic Games
21	27 July 2021	Nissan Stadium, Yokohama, Japan	China	1–0	8–2	2020 Olympic Games

== Honours ==
FC Utrecht

- KNVB Women's Cup: 2009–10

FC Twente

- BeNe League: 2012–13, 2013–14
- Eredivisie: 2012–13*, 2013–14*, 2014–15*, 2015–16
- KNVB Women's Cup: 2014–15

*During the BeNe League period (2012 to 2015), the highest placed Dutch team is considered as national champion by the Royal Dutch Football Association.

Lyon

- Division 1 Féminine: 2017–18, 2018–19, 2019–20
- Coupe de France Féminine: 2018–19, 2019–20
- UEFA Women's Champions League: 2017–18, 2018–19, 2019–20

Netherlands

- UEFA Women's Euro: 2017
- Algarve Cup: 2018

Individual

- Knight of the Order of Orange-Nassau: 2017

== We Play Strong ==
Van de Sanden is one of UEFA's official ambassadors for #WePlayStrong, a social media and vlogging campaign which was launched in 2018. The campaign's "...aim is to promote women’s football as much as we can and to make people aware of women’s football, really,” Evans, another participant explains. “The ultimate goal is to make football the most played sport by females by 2020. So it’s a UEFA initiative to get more women and girls playing football, whether they want to be professional or not.” The series, which also originally included professional footballers Sarah Zadrazil, Eunice Beckmann, Laura Feiersinger and Lisa Evans and now also includes Petronella Ekroth and Shanice van de Sanden, follows the daily lives of female professional footballers.

== Personal life ==
Van de Sanden was born in the Netherlands and is of Surinamese descent. As of August 2020, Van de Sanden has a girlfriend. She welcomed her first child in November 2023. She welcomed her 2nd child early 2026
