= Simona Necidová =

Czech footballer

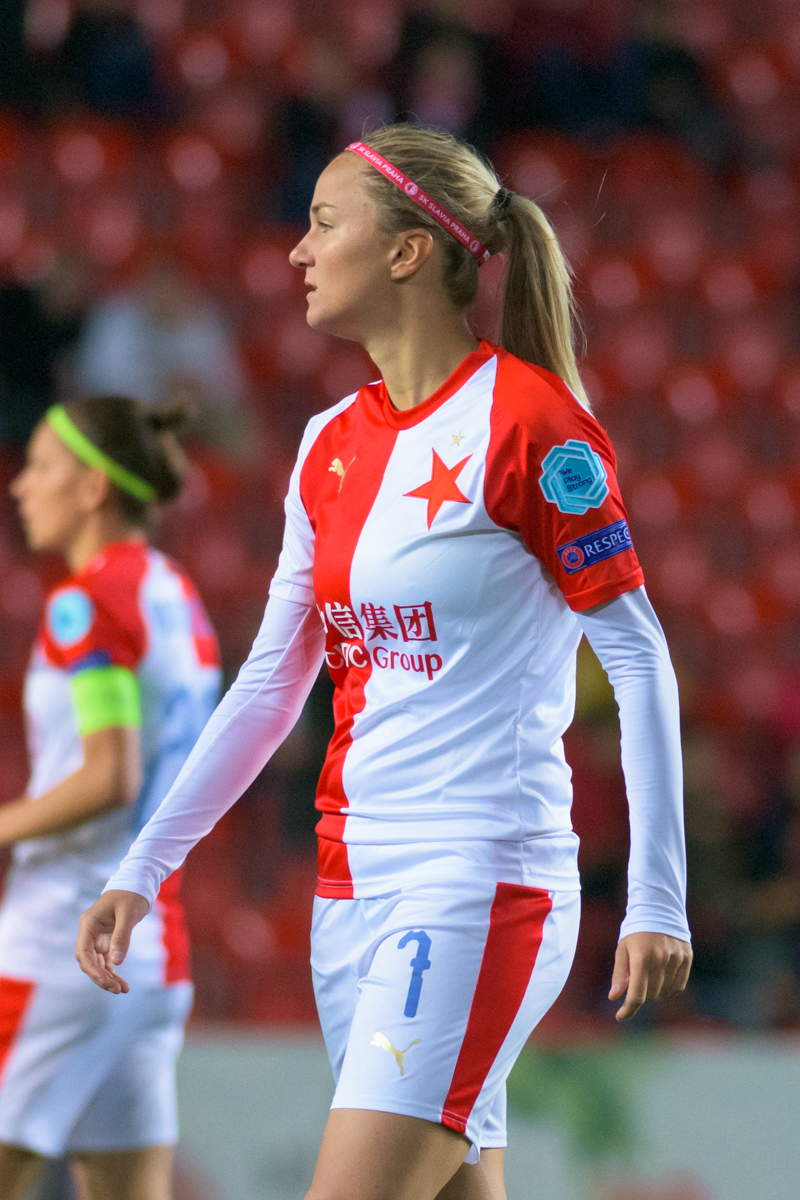
- Necidová with Slavia Prague in 2019

Personal information
- Full name: Simona Necidová
- Date of birth: 20 January 1994 (age 32)
- Place of birth: Prague, Czech Republic
- Height: 1.75 m (5 ft 9 in)
- Position: Defender

Youth career
- 2007–2011: Slavia Prague

Senior career*
Years	Team	Apps	(Gls)
2011–2024	Slavia Prague		
2018–2019	→ Slovan Liberec (loan)		

International career^{‡}
2013–	Czech Republic	32	(2)
- * Club domestic league appearances and goals ‡ National team caps and goals as of 6 February 2022

Simona Necidová (born 20 January 1994) is a Czech football defender who played for Czech First Division club Slavia Prague and the Czech Republic national team. Her elder brother Tomáš Necid is also an international footballer.

== Club career ==
Necidová joined Slavia Prague in 2007 and broke into the first team during the 2011–12 season. In the 2015–16 UEFA Women's Champions League, she scored the winning goal in Slavia's 2–1 win over Zvezda Perm which qualified her team for the quarter-final.

== International career ==
At the 2016 Cyprus Cup Necidová scored a late goal against Wales to secure a 1–0 win for the Czech Republic.

=== International goals ===
Statistics accurate as of match played 12 October 2022.

No.	Date	Venue	Opponent	Score	Result	Competition
1.	4 March 2016	Paralimni Stadium, Paralimni, Cyprus	Finland	1–0	3–1	2016 Cyprus Women's Cup
2.	7 March 2016	Paralimni Stadium, Paralimni, Cyprus	Wales	1–0	1–0	2016 Cyprus Women's Cup
3.	27 November 2022	Městský stadion, Ostrava, Czech Republic	Netherlands	2–1	2–2	2023 FIFA Women's World Cup qualification – UEFA Group C
