= Eunice Beckmann =

German footballer (born 1992)

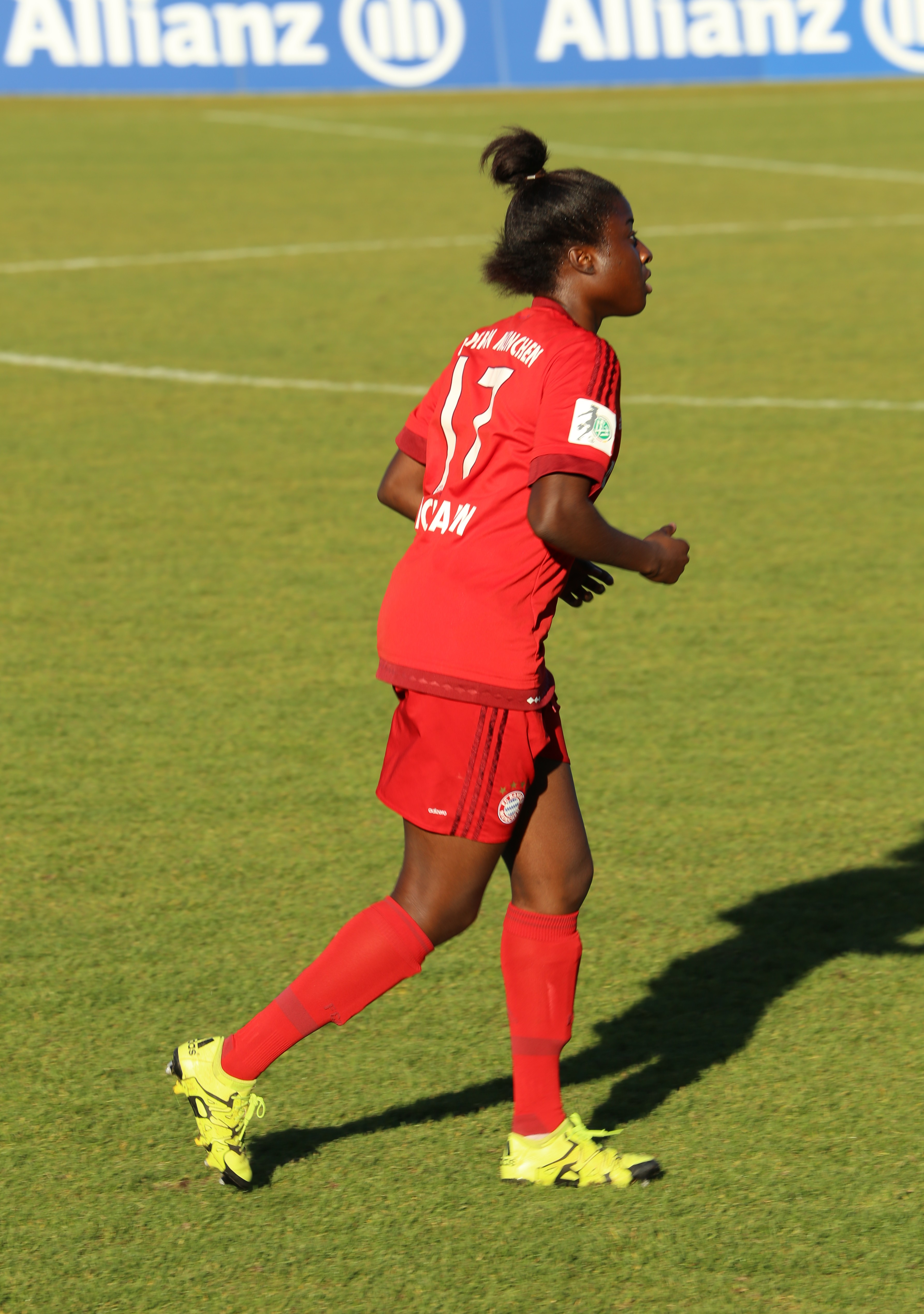
- Beckmann in 2015

Personal information
- Full name: Eunice Nketiah Beckmann
- Date of birth: 8 February 1992 (age 34)
- Place of birth: Wuppertal, Germany
- Height: 1.66 m (5 ft 5 in)
- Position: Forward

Youth career
- 2007–2008: Wuppertaler SV

Senior career*
Years	Team	Apps	(Gls)
2008–2010	FCR 2001 Duisburg II	12	(2)
2008–2010	FCR 2001 Duisburg	8	(2)
2010–2013	Bayer 04 Leverkusen	51	(10)
2013	Linköpings FC	9	(0)
2014–2016	Bayern Munich	38	(10)
2016	Boston Breakers	11	(0)
2017–2018	FC Basel	29	(22)
2018–2019	Madrid CFF	27	(5)
2019–2022	1. FC Köln	41	(7)
2023–2026	Viktoria Berlin	30	(10)

International career
2010–2011	Germany U19	10	(4)
- * Club domestic league appearances and goals as of 12 July 2026

Eunice Nketiah Beckmann (born 8 February 1992) is a German professional footballer.

Beckmann was born in Wuppertal to Ghanaian parents. She started playing with her local youth side, Wuppertaler SV.

== Club career ==
=== Duisburg, 2008–2010 ===
Beckmann started her senior career at age 17 with Duisburg, originally playing for the second team and then moving to the first time in the Frauen-Bundesliga in 2009. She made 8 appearances for the first team scoring 2 goals.

=== Bayern Leverkusen, 2010–2013 ===
Following two seasons Duisburg Beckmann moved to Frauen-Bundesliga club Bayer 04 Leverkusen where she played for three seasons. She made 51 regular season appearances with the club, scoring 10 goals.

=== Linköpings FC, 2013 ===
Beckmann then moved to Swedish Damallsvenskan club Linköpings FC signing a one season contract for the 2013 season. She played 9 regular season games for the club.

=== Bayern Munich, 2014–2016 ===
Following her season in Sweden Beckman returned to the Frauen-Bundesliga, this time signing with Bayern Munich. In December 2014 Beckmann extended her contract with Bayern. In her two and a half seasons with Bayern Beckmann scored 10 goals in 38 regular season appearances. She went on to win the Frauen-Bundesliga twice with Bayern in 2014–15, where she finished tied for 8th top scorer in the league, and 2015–16.

=== Boston Breakers, 2016 ===
In May 2016 Beckmann signed with National Women's Soccer League club the Boston Breakers. Beckmann spent one season with the club, making 11 regular season appearances.

=== FC Basel 2017–2018 ===
Beckmann signed an 18 month contract with FC Basel, of the Swiss Nationalliga A Women in January 2017. During her second season with the club Beckmann was the top scorer in the Nationalliga, scoring 25 goals in 26 games. Beckmann opted to leave the club after her contract expired.

=== Madrid CFF, 2018–2019 ===
In August 2018, she transferred to La Liga Iberdrola side Madrid CFF.

=== 1. FC Köln, 2019–2022 ===
In June 2019, Beckmann returned to the Frauen-Bundesliga by transferring to 1. FC Köln, where she signed a two-year contract. In August 2020, Köln extended the contract through 2022 after being relegated to 2. Frauen-Bundesliga. Köln won 46 of 48 possible points to win the south group of the 2020–21 2. Frauen-Bundesliga and was promoted back to the top flight.

On 11 March 2022, Beckmann suffered an injury in a challenge from Lena Lattwein during the 82nd minute of a match against Wolfsburg and was carried off the pitch on a stretcher. On 12 March, the club announced that Beckmann's anterior cruciate and medial collateral ligaments in her knee were torn. By 18 March 2022, she had undergone surgery and began rehabilitating the injury. On 15 May 2022, the club announced that Beckmann would not return to the club after the end of the 2021–22 Frauen-Bundesliga.

== We Play Strong ==
Beckmann is one of UEFA's official ambassadors for #WePlayStrong, a social media and vlogging campaign which was launched in 2018. The campaign's "...aim is to promote women's football as much as we can and to make people aware of women's football, really," Evans, another participant explains. "The ultimate goal is to make football the most played sport by females by 2020. So it's a UEFA initiative to get more women and girls playing football, whether they want to be professional or not." The series, which also originally included professional footballers Sarah Zadrazil, Lisa Evans, Laura Feiersinger and now also includes Petronella Ekroth and Shanice van de Sanden, follows the daily lives of female professional footballers.

== Honours ==
FCR 2001 Duisburg

- Bundesliga: Runner-up (1) 2009–10
- German Cup: Winner (1) 2009–10

FC Bayern München

- Bundesliga: Winner 2014–15, 2015–16

1. FC Köln

- 2. Frauen-Bundesliga: Winner, south group 2020–21
