= Sarah Zadrazil =

Austrian footballer (born 1993)

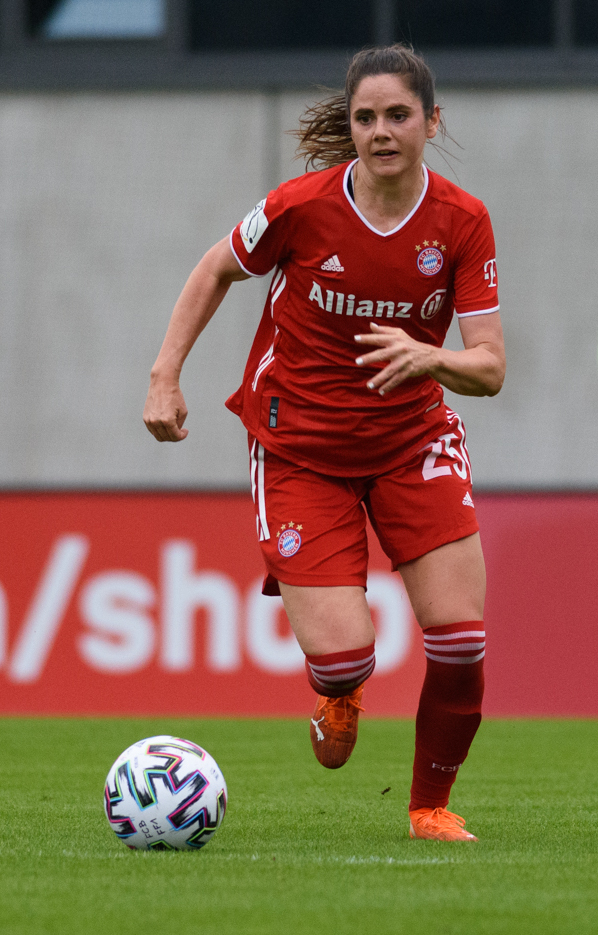
- Sarah Zadrazil with Bayern Munich in 2020

Personal information
- Full name: Sarah Zadrazil
- Date of birth: 19 February 1993 (age 33)
- Place of birth: Bad Ischl, Austria
- Height: 1.67 m (5 ft 6 in)
- Position: Midfielder

Team information
- Current team: Bayern Munich
- Number: 25

Youth career
- USC Abersee
- SG FC Bergheim / USK Hof

College career
Years	Team	Apps	(Gls)
2012–2015	ETSU Buccaneers		

Senior career*
Years	Team	Apps	(Gls)
2009–2011	SG FC Bergheim / USK Hof		
2015	Washington Spirit Reserves	12	(4)
2016–2020	Turbine Potsdam	82	(8)
2020–	Bayern Munich	108	(4)

International career^{‡}
	Austria U17	6	(5)
2009–2012	Austria U19	15	(8)
2010–	Austria	130	(15)
- * Club domestic league appearances and goals as of 14 November 2026 ‡ National team caps and goals as of 14 October 2026

Sarah Zadrazil (born 19 February 1993) is an Austrian footballer who plays as a midfielder for German club Bayern Munich and the Austria national team. With 128 appearances for her country, she is the second-most capped player in Austria's history.

== College career ==
Zadrazil played college soccer for the East Tennessee State Buccaneers (ETSU) in the southeastern United States. During her four years with the Buccaneers, Zadrazil broke several ETSU records. Her freshman year she tied the single-season assists record for a freshman. She was named to The Atlantic Sun Freshman of the Year. She followed this impressive freshman year with a sophomore year that saw her score 8 goals and provide 11 assist, meriting her the 2013 Atlantic Sun Player of the Year. Her junior year saw her become the ETSU career-leader in points, assists and shots attempted. She was named to the Southern Conference All-First Team and All-Tournament Team and NSCAA All-Southern Region Second Team. She finished her senior year being named to the NSCAA All-Southern Region Third team and became the first ever ETSU player to win the Southern Conference Player of the Year award. Zadrazil left ETSU as its career leader in points (101), assists (48), game-winning goals (11), shots attempted (213) and shots on goal (106). She graduated with a degree in exercise science.

== Club career ==
=== Washington Spirit reserve ===
In 2015, Zadrazil helped the Washington Spirit reserve team win the 2015 W-League championship. While she went undrafted in the 2016 NWSL College Draft, Zadrazil was invited in March 2016 to attend the Washington Spirit pre-season training camp as an unsigned player. Later in March 2016 she accepted an invitation to join Portland Thorns FC's training camp.

=== Turbine Potsdam ===
Zadrazil agreed a two-year contract with German Frauen-Bundesliga club Turbine Potsdam in May 2016. In December 2017, she extended her contract with Potsdam until June 30, 2020.

In December 2018, Zadrazil won the inaugural Austrian Footballer of the Year award, voted for by a panel of coaches from the Austrian Bundesliga and awarded by Austrian Press Agency DiePresse. She subsequently won the 2018–19 Salzburger Leonidas Sportwoman of the Year award.

Following the departures of some important players during the summer, Zadrazil became Turbine Potsdam captain for the 2019–20 season, a further sign of her already evident leadership qualities.

=== Bayern Munich ===
In June 2020, Zadrazil signed a three-year contract with fellow German club Bayern Munich. Sarah successfully adapted to having more defensive midfield responsibilities at Bayern and won the Frauen-Bundesliga title in her very first campaign, starting 17 and featuring in all 22 league games.

The Austrian played UEFA Women's Champions League football for the first time in her career and quickly established herself as a key component of Bayern's ambitious team, becoming vice-captain alongside Lina Magull within a couple of years at the club.

Bayern Women's sporting director Bianca Rech spoke about Zadrazil after she signed a contract extension in November 2022, saying: "Sarah has shown in the last two years at FC Bayern how important she is for this team. She's the midfield dynamo for us, especially in a defensive role, and that's what sets her apart. She's very important for us in the team."

Zadrazil was part of the Bayern side which went a record-breaking 44 matches unbeaten in the Frauen-Bundesliga from December 2021 to October 2024, winning both the 2022-23 and 2023-24 league titles respectively along the way. She then helped Bayern win their first-ever domestic double in the 2024-25 season. On 23 September 2025, Zadrazil suffered a cruciate ligament tear in her left knee during a league match against Freiburg, sidelining her for several months. On 16 December 2025, the Austrian agreed a new contract with Bayern until 2027.

== International career ==
Zadrazil made her debut for the Austria national team in a match against Turkey in 2010. In April 2016, she scored in a 6–1 victory over Kazakhstan. She helped Austria to a 2016 Cyprus Cup win, scoring once in the game against Hungary.

Zadrazil was part of the Austrian squad which reached the 2017 UEFA Women's Euro semifinal.

Zadrazil was part of the squad that was called up to the UEFA Women's Euro 2022.

As of December 2025, Zadrazil is the Austria women's national team's second-most most capped player and sixth-highest goalscorer of all time.

== Career statistics ==
=== Club ===
As of match played 19 November 2026:

Appearances and goals by club, season and competition
Club	Season	League			National Cup		Continental		Other		Total	
Club	Season	Division	Apps	Goals	Apps	Goals	Apps	Goals	Apps	Goals	Apps	Goals
USK Hof	2007–08	ÖFB Frauen 2. Liga Mitte	9	7	—		—		2 (Note: Appearance in the Relegation)	1	11	8
USK Hof	2008–09	ÖFB Frauen Bundesliga	16	6	3	5	—		2	0	21	11
USK Hof	2009–10	ÖFB Frauen Bundesliga	16	6	3	0	—		–		19	6
USK Hof	2010–11	ÖFB Frauen Bundesliga	16	3	3	0	—		–		19	3
USK Hof	Total		57	22	9	5	0	0	4	1	70	28
SG FC Bergheim / USK Hof	2011–12	ÖFB Frauen Bundesliga	18	7	2	5	—		–		20	12
SG FC Bergheim / USK Hof	2012–13	ÖFB Frauen Bundesliga	2	1	—		—		–		2	1
SG FC Bergheim / USK Hof	2013–14	ÖFB Frauen 2. Liga Mitte	2	4	—		—		1	0	3	4
SG FC Bergheim / USK Hof	2016	ÖFB Frauen 2. Liga Mitte	1	1	—		—		2	2	2	2
SG FC Bergheim / USK Hof	Total		23	13	2	5	0	0	3	2	28	20
Turbine Potsdam	2016–17	Frauen-Bundesliga	21	1	1	0	—		–		22	1
Turbine Potsdam	2017–18	Frauen-Bundesliga	18	3	3	0	—		–		21	3
Turbine Potsdam	2018–19	Frauen-Bundesliga	22	4	3	0	—		–		25	4
Turbine Potsdam	2019–20	Frauen-Bundesliga	22	0	3	2	—		–		25	2
Turbine Potsdam	Total		83	8	10	2	0	0	0	0	93	10
Bayern Munich	2019–20	Frauen-Bundesliga	—		–		1 (Note: Appearances in UEFA Women's Champions League)	0	–		1	0
Bayern Munich	2020–21	Frauen-Bundesliga	22	1	4	0	8	1	–		34	2
Bayern Munich	2021–22	Frauen-Bundesliga	19	0	4	1	7	0	–		30	1
Bayern Munich	2022–23	Frauen-Bundesliga	21	1	4	0	9	0	–		34	1
Bayern Munich	2023–24	Frauen-Bundesliga	19	0	3	0	6	0	–		28	0
Bayern Munich	2024–25	Frauen-Bundesliga	17	1	4	0	7	1	1 (Note: Appearances in DFB-Supercup)	0	29	2
Bayern Munich	2025–26	Frauen-Bundesliga	4	0	0	0	0	0	1	0	5	0
Bayern Munich	2026–27	Frauen-Bundesliga	6	1	1	0	3	0	0	0	10	1
Bayern Munich	Total		108	4	20	1	41	2	2	0	171	7
Career Total			271	47	41	13	41	2	9	3	362	68

=== International goals ===
Scores and results list Austria's goal tally first.

Goal	Date	Venue	Opponent	Score	Result	Competition
1.	5 March 2014	Stadium Bela Vista, Parchal, Portugal	Portugal	1–2	2–3	2014 Algarve Cup
2.	12 March 2014	Estádio Algarve, Faro, Portugal	Portugal	2–0	2–1	2014 Algarve Cup
3.	4 March 2016	GSZ Stadium, Larnaca, Cyprus	Hungary	1–0	2–1	2016 Cyprus Women's Cup
5.	7 April 2016	Vorwärts Stadium, Steyr, Austria	Kazakhstan	4–0	6–1	UEFA Women's Euro 2017 qualifying
6.	6 July 2017	Stadion Wiener Neustadt, Wiener Neustadt, Austria	Denmark	3–1	4–2	Friendly
7.	6 July 2017	Stadion Wiener Neustadt, Wiener Neustadt, Austria	Denmark	4–1	4–2	Friendly
8.	26 July 2017	Sparta Stadion Het Kasteel, Rotterdam, Netherlands	Iceland	1–0	3–0	UEFA Women's Euro 2017
9.	4 September 2018	Stadion Wiener Neustadt, Wiener Neustadt, Austria	Finland	2–0	4–1	2019 FIFA Women's World Cup qualification
10.	8 November 2019	Toše Proeski Arena, Skopje, North Macedonia	North Macedonia	2–0	3–0	UEFA Women's Euro 2022 qualifying
11.	12 November 2019	BSFZ-Arena, Maria Enzersdorf, Austria	Kazakhstan	7–0	9–0	UEFA Women's Euro 2022 qualifying
12.	30 November 2021	Stade de Luxembourg, Luxembourg City, Luxembourg	Luxembourg	8–0	8–0	2023 FIFA Women's World Cup qualification
13.	12 June 2022	Stadion Wiener Neustadt, Wiener Neustadt, Austria	Denmark	1–0	1–2	Friendly
14.	17 February 2023	Hibernians Stadium, Paola, Malta	Netherlands	2–1	2–1	Friendly

== Personal life ==
Sarah is a trained nursery teacher and would work in this area if she didn't pursue football. Zadrazil has a Bachelor's degree in sports science and has started studying towards getting a coaching licence. The footballer has also helped to setup her own summer football training camp in Austria for young girls, which has been running annually since 2022.

Growing up, Zadrazil was largely inspired to play football by her older brother Patrick, who played up to a second division level, and she was helped in terms of training by her father, who is a football coach.

=== We Play Strong ===
Zadrazil is one of UEFA's official ambassadors for #WePlayStrong, a social media and vlogging campaign which was launched in 2018. The campaign's "...aim is to promote women’s football as much as we can and to make people aware of women’s football, really,” Evans, another participant explains. “The ultimate goal is to make football the most played sport by females by 2020. So it’s a UEFA initiative to get more women and girls playing football, whether they want to be professional or not.” The series, which also originally included professional footballers Lisa Evans, Eunice Beckmann, Laura Feiersinger and now also includes Petronella Ekroth and Shanice van de Sanden, follows the daily lives of female professional footballers.

== Honours ==
Bayern Munich

- Bundesliga: 2020–21, 2022–23, 2023–24, 2024–25, 2025–26
- DFB-Pokal: 2024–25, 2025–26
- DFB-Supercup: 2024, 2025

Austria

- Cyprus Women's Cup: 2016

Individual

- Austrian Footballer of the Year: 2018
- Salzburger Leonidas Sportwoman of the Year: 2018–19

== See also ==
- List of women's footballers with 100 or more international caps

Sporting positions
Preceded by (United States) Ramey Kerns (East Tennessee State University)	ASUN Player of the Year; 2013	Succeeded by (United States) Tabby Tindell (Florida Gulf Coast University)
