= Lisa Evans =

Scottish footballer (born 1992)

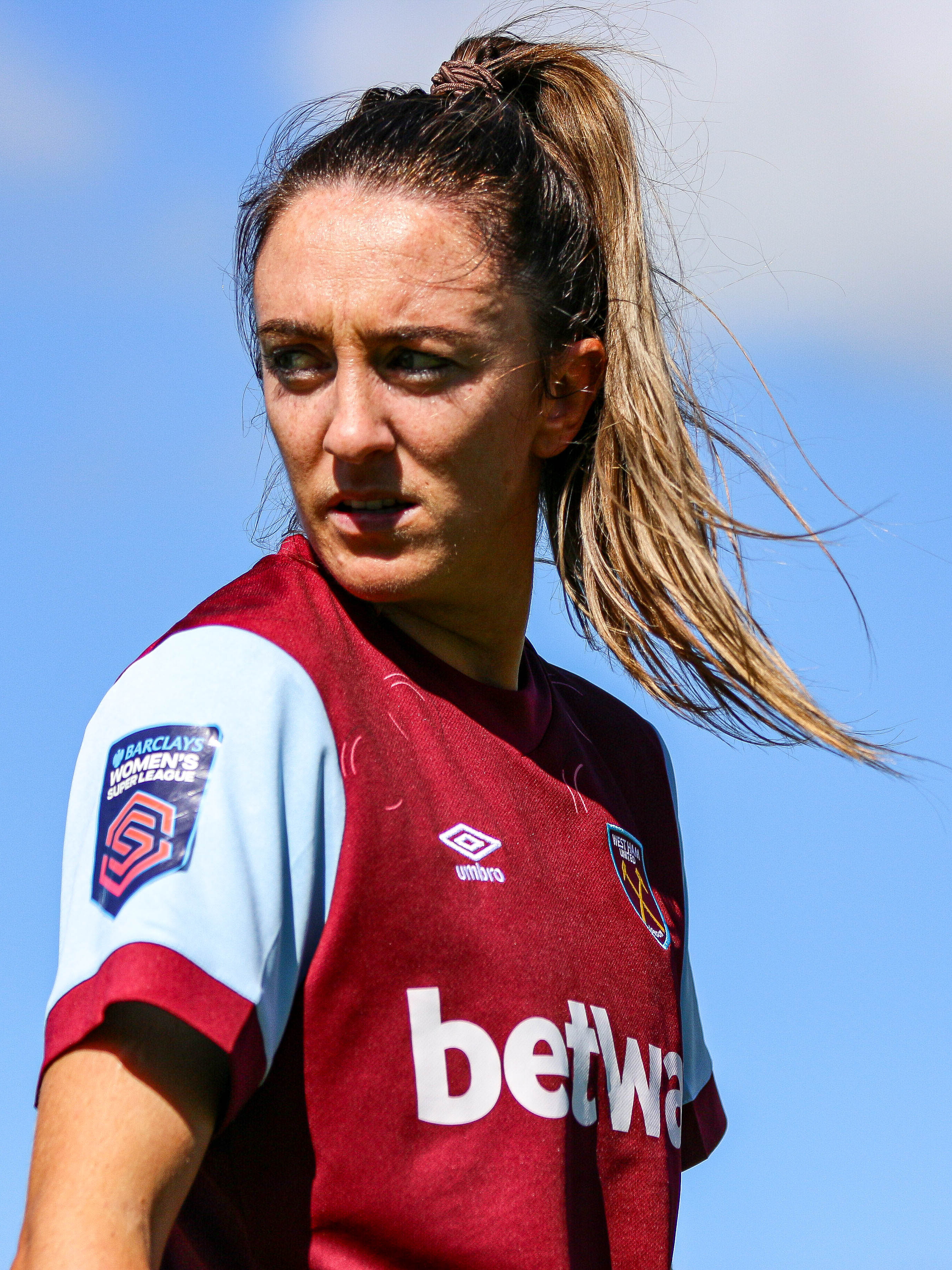
- Evans with West Ham United in 2023

Personal information
- Full name: Lisa Catherine Evans
- Date of birth: 21 May 1992 (age 34)
- Place of birth: Perth, Scotland
- Height: 1.66 m (5 ft 5 in)
- Positions: Winger; wing-back; full back

Team information
- Current team: Glasgow City
- Number: 17

Youth career
- St Johnstone Girls
- 2008–2009: Glasgow City

Senior career*
Years	Team	Apps	(Gls)
2009–2012	Glasgow City	29+	(34+)
2012–2015	Turbine Potsdam	49	(9)
2015–2017	FC Bayern Munich	32	(2)
2017–2022	Arsenal	62	(7)
2021–2022	→ West Ham United (loan)	16	(1)
2022–2024	West Ham United	31	(4)
2024	Bristol City	9	(0)
2024–	Glasgow City	7	(0)

International career^{‡}
2007–2008	Scotland U17	9	(4)
2009–2011	Scotland U19	23	(5)
2011–	Scotland	115	(17)
- * Club domestic league appearances and goals as of 17 September 2024 ‡ National team caps and goals as of 7 July 2024

Lisa Catherine Evans (born 21 May 1992) is a Scottish professional footballer who plays for Scottish Women's Premier League club Glasgow City and the Scotland national team. Operating as a winger or full-back, she began her senior career at Glasgow City, then played for Turbine Potsdam and FC Bayern Munich in Germany's Frauen-Bundesliga, and for Arsenal, West Ham United and Bristol City in the English FA WSL, winning the domestic league title in all three nations.

== Early life ==
Born in Perth, to Richard and Kate, Lisa Evans played as a youth with local team St Johnstone Women (where she played alongside future international teammate Lana Clelland).

== Club career ==
=== Glasgow City ===
Evans joined Scottish Women's Premier League (SWPL) powerhouse side Glasgow City in August 2008. She originally started to play for the club's reserve team which won the second division with a 100% record, making her first team debut in 2009. Evans was also among the first scholarship recipients to the Scottish FA's National Women's Football Academy at the University of Stirling, where she studied Sports Science.

During her time at Glasgow City, the club won the Scottish Women's Premier League four times (2009 to 2012), the SWPL Cup twice (2009 and 2012) and the Scottish Women's Cup twice (2009 and 2011). Evans also won the Glasgow City 2011 Young Player of the Year award. She was also part of the Glasgow side which reached the last sixteen stage of the UEFA Women's Champions League for the first time, which provided an idea of her talents to a wider audience. Evans left Glasgow having scored 46 goals in 39 regular season games.

=== Turbine Potsdam ===
In February 2012, German Frauen-Bundesliga champions Turbine Potsdam invited Evans for a trial, after spotting her in their 17–0 UEFA Women's Champions League aggregate win over Glasgow City. On 12 June 2012, it was revealed that she had signed a professional contract with Potsdam. In December 2012 Evans's contract was extended by a further two years; at the time of the extension, Turbine's veteran coach Bernd Schröder described being impressed by the start Evans had made: "It means we're able to secure the long-term services of a player who has developed a lot over the last few weeks and months. Lisa has fitted in really well to the philosophy of the club as a footballer and as a person, and is an enormous benefit to the team." During her first year at Potsdam in 2012–13, Evans was part of a team that was runner-up in both the league and the DFB-Pokal Frauen, and they were Pokal finalists again in 2014–15. She left Potsdam having played 41 regular season games, scoring 7 goals in the process.

=== Bayern Munich ===
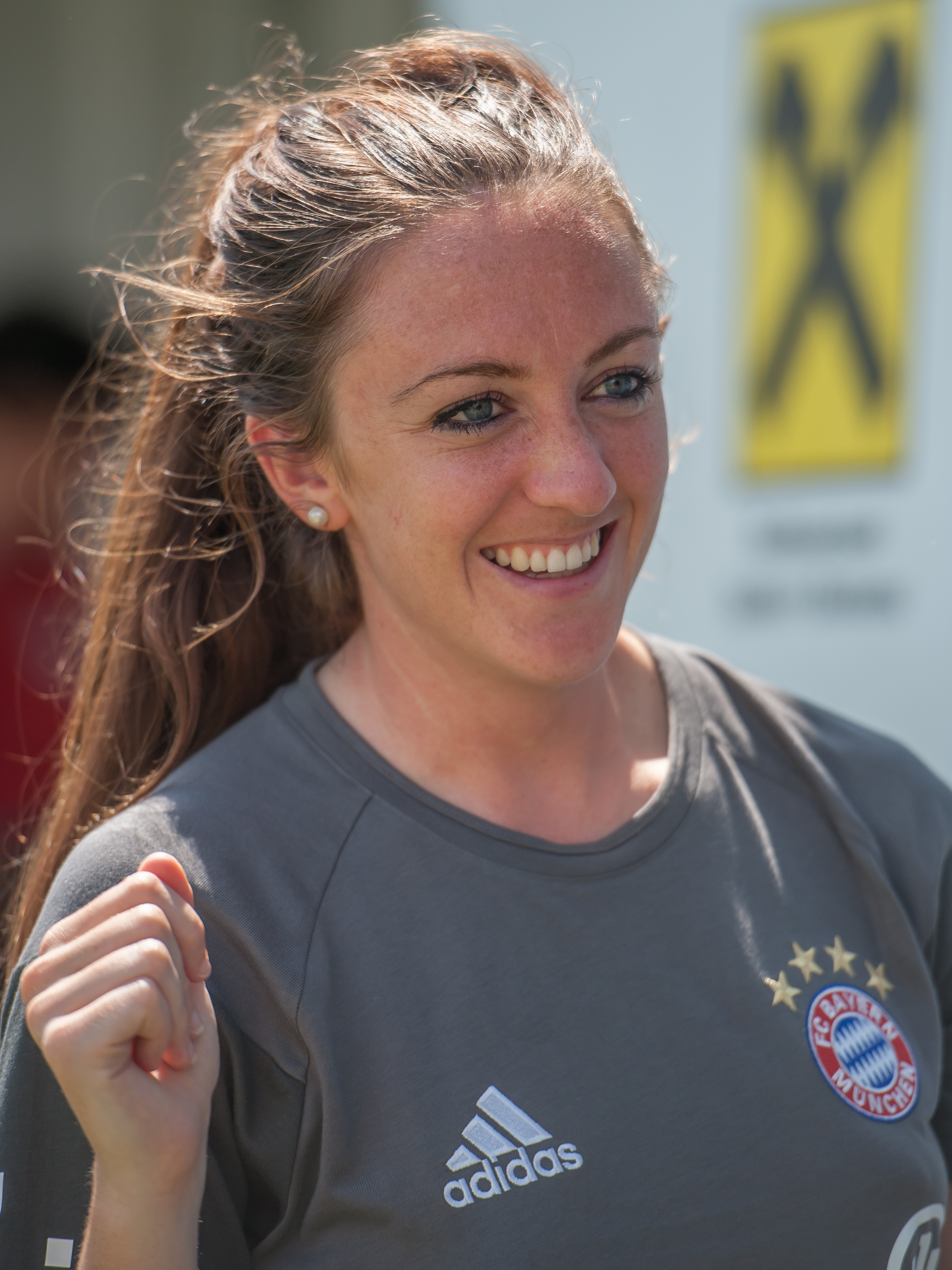
Evans with Bayern Munich in 2016

In April 2015, Evans announced that she had signed a three-year contract with Turbine's Frauen-Bundesliga rivals FC Bayern Munich, to begin the following season. Evans went on to win the 2015–16 Frauen-Bundesliga with Bayern, as well as finishing runners-up the following year. The team also reached the Round of 32 in the 2015–16 UEFA Women's Champions League and the quarter-finals of the 2016–17 UEFA Women's Champions League. During her time at Bayern, Evans made 32 regular season appearances, scoring twice.

=== Arsenal ===
On 29 June 2017, Evans signed for Arsenal. Due to injuries and competition for places in her usual playing position, coach Joe Montemurro sometimes deployed Evans as a full-back: "One week I find myself on the left wing and then the other I find myself at right-back but it's something I've really enjoyed. It's made me an all-around better player." She extended her contract with the FA WSL club in December 2018. During her first season with Arsenal in 2017–18, Evans played 18 regular season games, scoring two goals, went on to win the WSL Cup and was a Women's FA Cup finalist. Her second season with the club saw her play another 18 regular season games and help Arsenal to a runner-up position in the WSL Cup and finish as champions in the FA WSL. Evans played her 50th match with the club overall on 31 March 2019 against Birmingham City; Arsenal won the game 1–0 and as a result qualified for the Champions League for the first time since 2014.

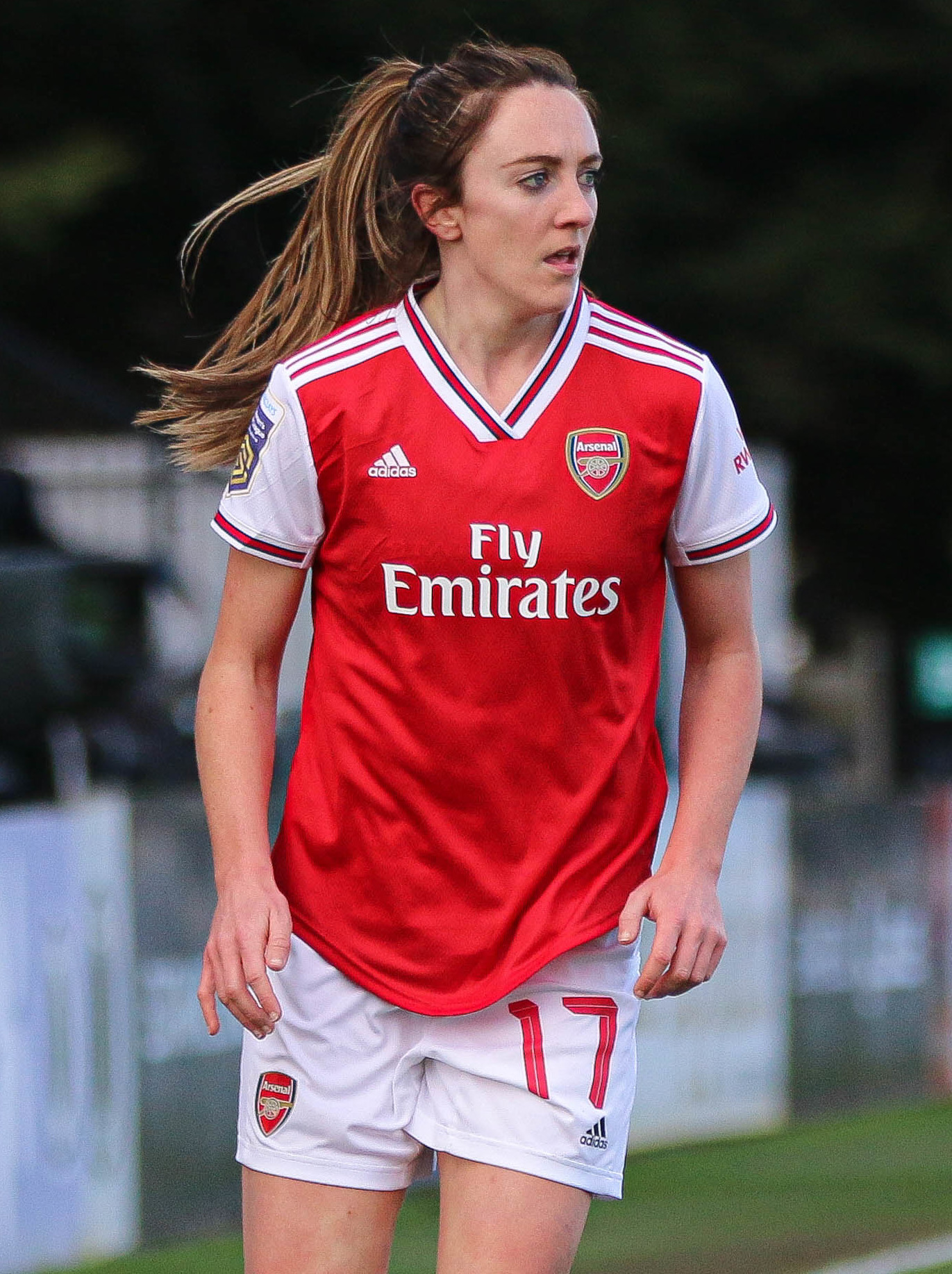
Evans with Arsenal in 2020

On 12 September 2019, Evans scored in the first-leg of a Champions League tie against Fiorentina.

On 26 September 2020, Evans scored a hat-trick in the FA Cup against North London rivals Tottenham Hotspur.

==== Loan to West Ham United ====
Evans moved on loan to West Ham United in August 2021.

=== Later career ===
Evans signed for West Ham United permanently on 17 June 2022.

On 25 January 2024, she signed for Bristol City. Intended to run until May 2025, the deal was cut short and she returned to Scotland and Glasgow City in July 2024.

== International career ==
Evans made her debut with the Scottish national team against Wales in October 2011. In February 2012 Evans scored her first international goal in a 5–1 friendly win over Northern Ireland in Belfast. She was part of the squad which narrowly failed to qualify for the UEFA Women's Euro 2013 with a late defeat in the qualification play-off.

Evans scored three goals for Scotland during UEFA qualifying for the 2015 FIFA Women's World Cup. Scotland finished second in their qualifying group and advanced to the UEFA play-offs where they were eliminated by the Netherlands.

In 2017, Scotland qualified for the European Championship for the first time ever. Evans was named to the Scotland squad for Euro 2017 and appeared in all three group games. This was followed by qualifying directly for the 2019 FIFA Women's World Cup after winning their group. Evans was selected for the Scottish world cup squad on 15 May 2019.

In Scotland's opening World Cup match against rivals England, Evans provided the assist to Claire Emslie, who scored Scotland's first World Cup goal.

== Personal life ==
Evans was in a relationship with former Bayern Munich and Arsenal teammate Vivianne Miedema, an international with Netherlands, for six years.

In November 2021, Evans joined the charity movement Common Goal, committing 1% of her salary to community organisations working with young people. Evans said she and Miedema "want to be happy and constructive human beings off the pitch. Common Goal is the perfect platform to create change through football in a collective, sustainable way."

In 2021 on the We Play Strong Channel, she said that she was studying part-time in Sport, Health and Fitness via an online course.

=== Scottish FA Girls Soccer Centres ===
The Scottish FA launched dedicated Girls' Soccer Centres across Scotland before Euro 2017 to increase participation in football among primary school-aged girls across Scotland. Evans was appointed as an ambassador for the East Region covering Angus, Dundee, Fife, and her hometown area of Perth & Kinross.

=== We Play Strong ===
Evans is one of UEFA's official ambassadors for #WePlayStrong, a social media and vlogging campaign which was launched in 2018. The campaign's "...aim is to promote women's football as much as we can and to make people aware of women's football, really," Evans explains. "The ultimate goal is to make football the most played sport by females by 2020. So it's a UEFA initiative to get more women and girls playing football, whether they want to be professional or not." The series, which also originally included professional footballers Sarah Zadrazil, Eunice Beckmann, Laura Feiersinger and now also includes Petronella Ekroth, Shanice van de Sanden and Beth Mead, follows the daily lives of female professional footballers.

== Career statistics ==
=== International appearances ===
As of the match played 4 June 2024

National team	Year	Apps	Goals
Scotland	2011	1	0
Scotland	2012	15	2
Scotland	2013	11	3
Scotland	2014	13	5
Scotland	2015	6	2
Scotland	2016	6	0
Scotland	2017	14	3
Scotland	2018	9	2
Scotland	2019	8	0
Scotland	2020	2	0
Scotland	2021	5	0
Scotland	2022	4	0
Scotland	2023	9	0
Scotland	2024	6	0
Total		109	17

=== International goals ===
Scores and results list Scotland's goal tally first.

#	Date	Venue	Opponent	Result	Competition	Scored
1	5 February 2012	Solitude, Belfast	Northern Ireland	5–1	Friendly	1
2	9 May 2012	Stadion Kazimierza Deyny, Starogard Gdański	Poland	3–1	Friendly	1
3	8 March 2013	GSZ Stadium, Larnaca	England	4–4	2013 Cyprus Cup	1
4	22 September 2013	Tórsvøllur, Tórshavn	Faroe Islands	7–2	2015 FIFA Women's World Cup qualification	1
5	26 September 2013	Fir Park, Motherwell	Bosnia and Herzegovina	7–0	2015 FIFA Women's World Cup qualification	1
6	7 March 2014	GSP Stadium, Nicosia	Netherlands	4–3	2014 Cyprus Cup	3
7	7 March 2014	GSP Stadium, Nicosia	Netherlands	4–3	2014 Cyprus Cup	3
8	7 March 2014	GSP Stadium, Nicosia	Netherlands	4–3	2014 Cyprus Cup	3
9	10 March 2014	GSZ Stadium, Larnaca	Australia	4–2	2014 Cyprus Cup	1
10	5 April 2014	Fir Park, Motherwell	Poland	2–0	2015 FIFA Women's World Cup qualification	1
11	23 October 2015	Fir Park, Motherwell	Belarus	7–0	2017 EURO qualification	1
12	29 November 2015	St Mirren Park, Paisley	North Macedonia	10–0	2017 EURO qualification	1
13	6 March 2017	Makario Stadium, Nicosia	Austria	3–1	2017 Cyprus Cup	1
14	9 June 2017	Falkirk Stadium, Falkirk	Romania	2–0	Friendly	1
15	24 October 2017	Paisley 2021 Stadium, Paisley	Albania	5–0	2019 FIFA Women's World Cup qualification	1
16	3 March 2018	Pinatar Arena, Murcia	New Zealand	2–0	Friendly	1
17	12 June 2018	Kielce City Stadium, Kielce	Poland	3–2	2019 FIFA Women's World Cup qualification	1

== Honours ==
Glasgow City

- Scottish Women's Premier League: 2009, 2010, 2011, 2012
- Scottish Women's Cup: 2008–09, 2011
- Scottish Women's Premier League Cup: 2009, 2012

Bayern Munich

- Bundesliga: 2015–16

Arsenal

- FA WSL: 2018–19
- FA Women's League Cup: 2018

== See also ==
- List of women's footballers with 100 or more caps
- Scottish FA Women's International Roll of Honour
