= Silvana Chojnowski =

German-Polish footballer

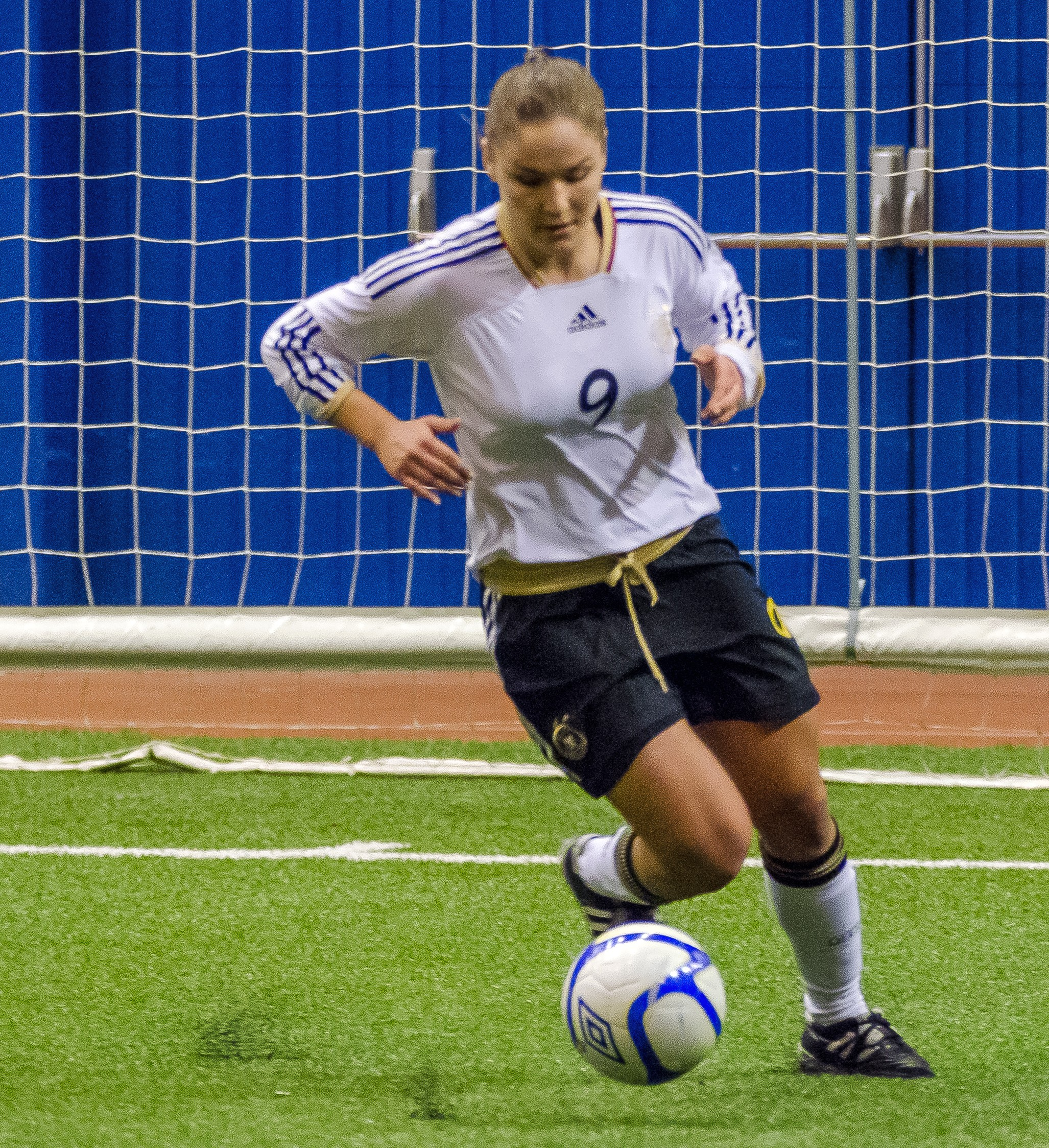
- Chojnowski playing a U-19 friendly against Sweden in November 2012.

Personal information
- Full name: Silvana Katharina Chojnowski
- Date of birth: 17 April 1994 (age 32)
- Place of birth: Frankfurt, Germany
- Height: 1.65 m (5 ft 5 in)
- Position: Striker

Senior career*
| Years | Team | Apps | (Gls) |
- FSV Frankfurt
| 2011–2013 | 1. FFC Frankfurt | 3 | (0) |
| 2013–2016 | TSG Hoffenheim | 38 | (6) |
| 2016–2017 | SC Sand | 13 | (0) |
| 2017–2018 | 1. FC Köln | 2 | (0) |
| 2018–2019 | BV Cloppenburg | 2 | (1) |

International career
| 2010 | Germany U17 | 3 | (1) |
| 2013 | Germany U19 | 4 | (1) |
| 2012 | Germany U20 | 5 | (0) |
| 2016–2017 | Poland | 14 | (1) |
- * Club domestic league appearances and goals

Silvana Katharina Chojnowski (born 17 April 1994) is a former footballer who played as a striker. She holds both German and Polish citizenship.

As a German youth international she played the 2010 U-17 European Championship and the 2010 U-17 World Cup, scoring in both as a member of the German squad. From 2016 to 2017, she played for the Poland national team.

== Career statistics ==
=== International ===
Appearances and goals by national team and year
| National team | Year | Apps | Goals |
|---|---|---|---|
| Poland | 2016 | 10 | 1 |
| Poland | 2017 | 4 | 0 |
| Total | | 14 | 1 |

Scores and results list Poland's goal tally first, score column indicates score after each Chojnowski goal.

List of international goals scored by Silvana Chojnowski
| No. | Date | Venue | Opponent | Score | Result | Competition |
|---|---|---|---|---|---|---|
| 1 | 2 March 2016 | GSZ Stadium, Larnaca, Cyprus | Czech Republic | 1–0 | 1–0 | 2016 Cyprus Women's Cup |
