= 2016 UEFA Women's Olympic Qualifying Tournament =

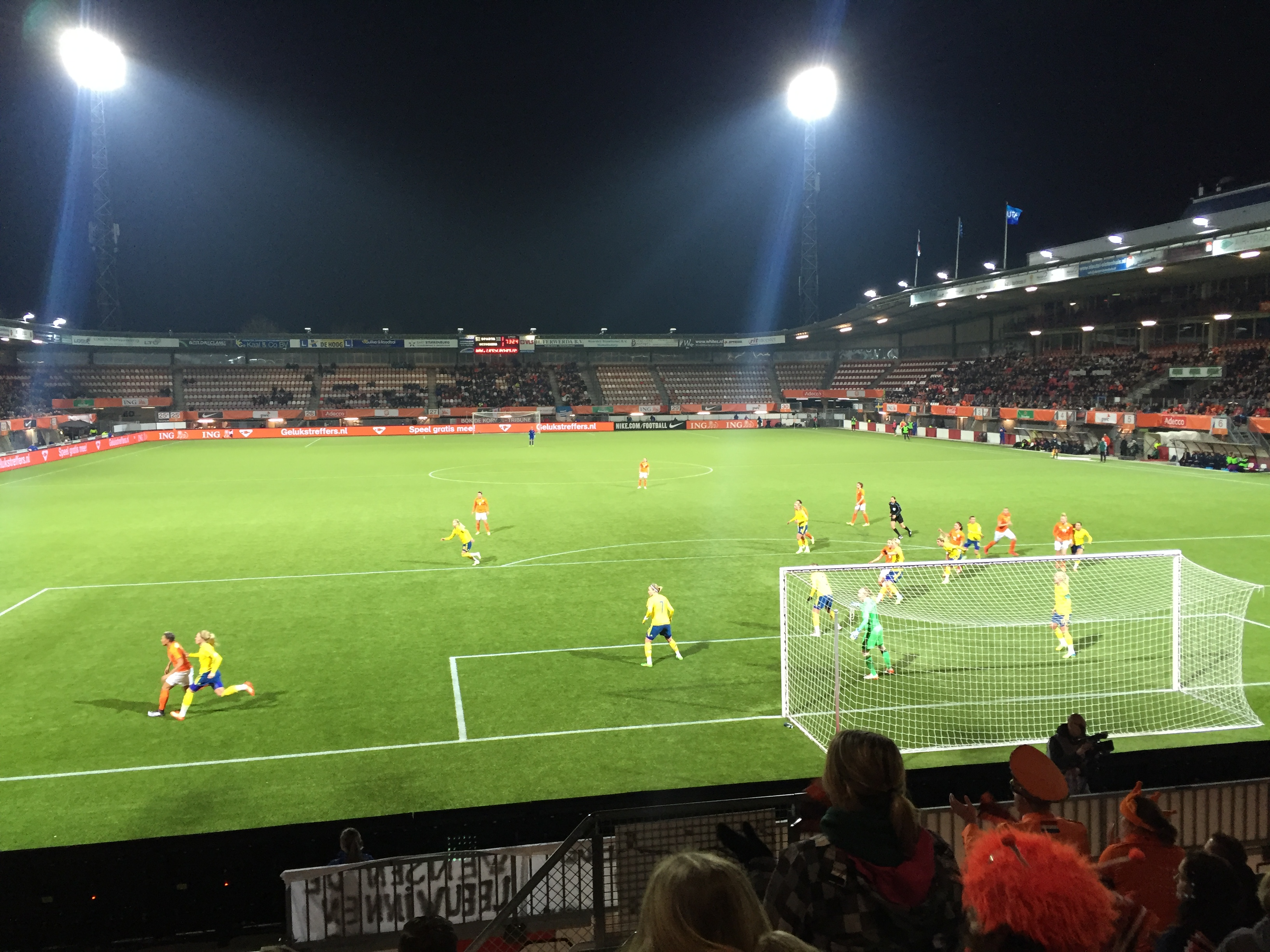
- Sweden vs. Netherlands, the top 2 teams of the tournament

Tournament details
- Host country: Netherlands
- Dates: 2–9 March 2016
- Teams: 4 (from 1 confederation)
- Venue: 3 (in 2 host cities)

Final positions
- Champions: Sweden
- Runners-up: Netherlands
- Third place: Switzerland
- Fourth place: Norway

Tournament statistics
- Matches played: 6
- Goals scored: 19 (3.17 per match)
- Top scorer(s): (Netherlands) Manon Melis (Netherlands) Vivianne Miedema (Norway) Ada Hegerberg (Switzerland) Rahel Kiwic (2 goals each)

The 2016 UEFA Women's Olympic Qualifying Tournament was an international football competition organised by UEFA to determine the final women's national team from Europe to qualify for the 2016 Summer Olympics women's football tournament in Brazil. The tournament was played between 2 and 9 March 2016 in the Netherlands.

Four teams participated in the tournament: Netherlands, Norway, Sweden and Switzerland. As the tournament winner, Sweden qualified for the last available Olympic spot from Europe, joining France and Germany, who had already qualified, as the three UEFA representatives.

== Background ==
Same as the qualification process for previous Olympics, UEFA used the FIFA Women's World Cup to determine which women's national teams from Europe qualify for the Olympic football tournament. The three teams from UEFA that progressed the furthest in the 2015 FIFA Women's World Cup played in Canada, other than ineligible England, would qualify for the 2016 Summer Olympics women's football tournament in Brazil. If teams in contention for the Olympic spots were eliminated in the same round, ties were not broken by their overall tournament record, and play-offs or a mini-tournament to decide the spots would be held provisionally in February/March 2016.

England were ineligible for the Olympics as they were not an Olympic nation, although Great Britain did compete in 2012 as the host nation. The Football Association had originally declared on 2 March 2015 its intention to enter and run teams on behalf of the British Olympic Association at the 2016 Olympics should England qualify. Following strong objections from the Scottish, Welsh and Northern Irish football associations, and a commitment from FIFA that they would not allow entry of a British team unless all four Home Nations agreed, the Football Association announced on 30 March 2015 that they would not seek entry into the Olympic tournament.

After Norway were eliminated by England in the round of 16 on 22 June 2015, it was confirmed that two of the three spots would go to quarter-finalists France and Germany because there could not be more than three eligible European teams in the quarter-finals. Eventually no other eligible European team reached the quarter-finals, so the four European teams eliminated in the round of 16 (Netherlands, Norway, Sweden and Switzerland) would compete in the UEFA play-off tournament to decide the last spot.

The last time a play-off was necessary to decide a European spot in the Olympic women's football tournament was when Sweden defeated Denmark over two legs to claim a place in the 2008 Olympics. Same as this time, had England been eligible to enter, they would have qualified as one of the top three UEFA teams in the 2007 FIFA Women's World Cup, rendering the play-off unnecessary.

UEFA teams qualified for 2015 FIFA Women's World Cup
Team	Final result in 2015 FIFA Women's World Cup	Qualification for 2016 Summer Olympics
England	Third place	Ineligible
Germany	Fourth place	Qualified
France	Eliminated in quarter-finals	Qualified
Netherlands	Eliminated in round of 16	Play-off tournament
Norway	Eliminated in round of 16	Play-off tournament
Sweden	Eliminated in round of 16	Play-off tournament
Switzerland	Eliminated in round of 16	Play-off tournament
Spain	Eliminated in group stage	

== Teams ==
Among the four teams, only Norway and Sweden had previously played in the Olympics. Norway had played in three Olympics, and were the only European gold medalists so far, winning in 2000, and also taking bronze in 1996. Sweden had played in all five Olympics so far, but never won a medal, with their best finish being fourth in 2004.

Team	FIFA Rankings at start of event	UEFA Rankings at start of event	Squads
Netherlands	12	8	Netherlands squad
Norway	10	4	Norway squad
Sweden	8	3	Sweden squad
Switzerland	20	13	Switzerland squad

== Format ==
UEFA confirmed on 24 June 2015 to the Norwegian newspaper Dagbladet that the four teams would meet each other once, making it a last chance round robin tournament with six matches altogether. The rules of the UEFA and FIFA tournaments were maintained. A victory would win 3 points, a draw would win 1 point, and the Olympic would go to the team that finished at the first place after the end of six games. The period reserved for this playoff tournament was also the FIFA women's international matches period from 29 February to 9 March 2016. The four teams concerned would need to agree on the exact dates within this window. The tournament would be arranged in one of the participating four countries.

On 22 July 2015 UEFA announced that the Netherlands would host the tournament, with matches taking place between 2 and 9 March 2016.

== Venues ==
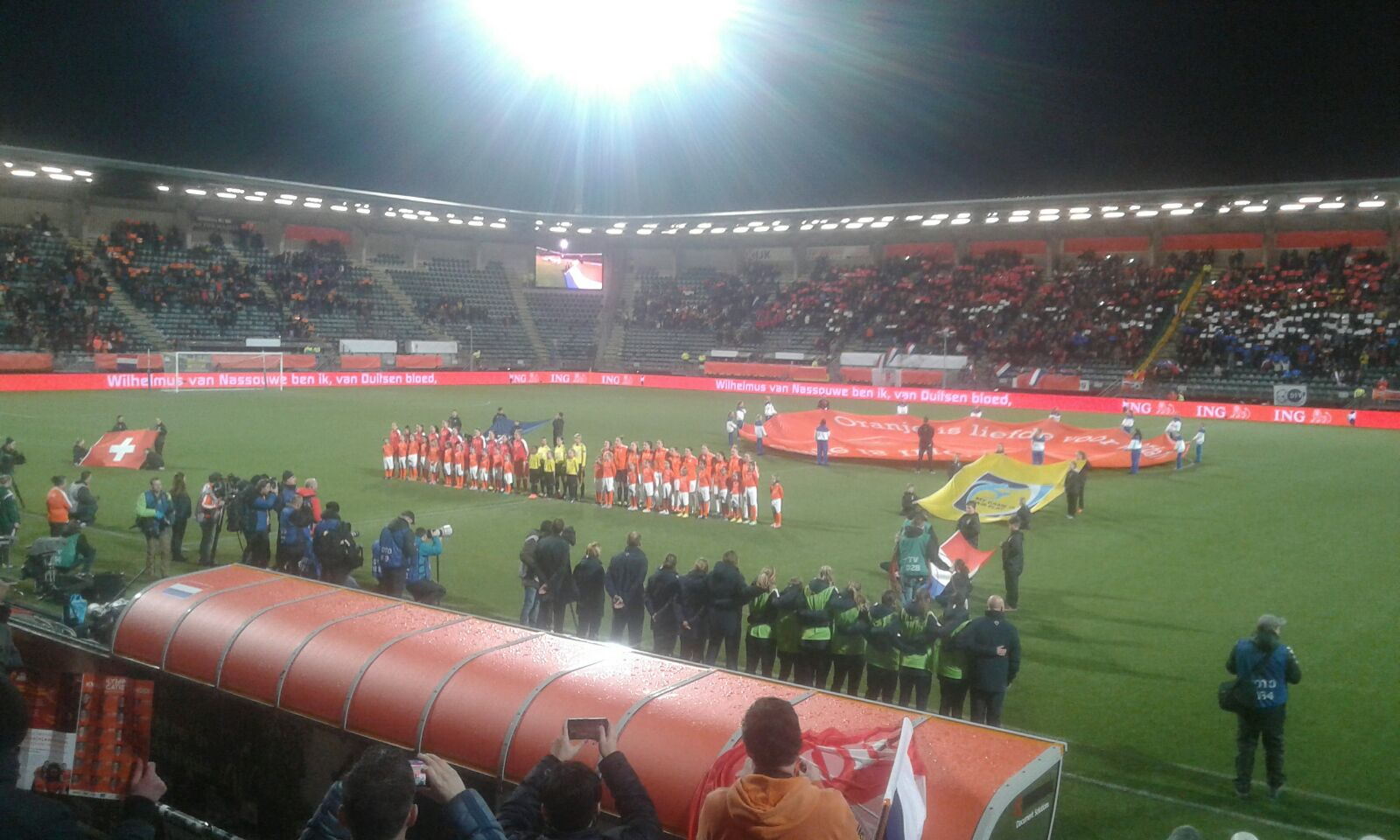
Before the kick-off of Netherlands vs. Switzerland

Rotterdam and The Hague were confirmed as host cities by the Royal Dutch Football Association (KNVB) on 19 October 2015.

Venue	Location	Capacity	Surface	No. of matches
Kyocera Stadion	The Hague	15,000	Artificial turf	1
Het Kasteel	Rotterdam	11,000	Grass	2
Stadion Woudestein	Rotterdam	3,530	Artificial turf	3

== Standings ==
Pos	Team	Pld	W	D	L	GF	GA	GD	Pts	Qualification
1	Sweden	3	2	1	0	3	1	+2	7	2016 Summer Olympics
2	Netherlands (H)	3	1	1	1	6	8	−2	4	
3	Switzerland	3	1	0	2	5	6	−1	3	
4	Norway	3	1	0	2	5	4	+1	3	

Source: UEFA
Rules for classification: 1) Points; 2) Points between tied teams; 3) Goal difference between tied teams; 4) Goals scored between tied teams; 5) Reapply 2–4 if necessary; 6) Goal difference; 7) Goals scored; 8) Disciplinary points; 9) UEFA ranking
(H) Hosts

== Matches ==
All times CET (UTC+1).

2 March 2016
19:30

Norway	0–1	Sweden
	Report	Dahlkvist 3'

Stadion Woudestein, Rotterdam
Attendance: 401
Referee: Bibiana Steinhaus (Germany)
2 March 2016
19:30

Switzerland	3–4	Netherlands
Humm 4'; Kiwic 74'; Bachmann 83'	Report	Melis 29' (pen.); Miedema 56'; Van den Berg 61'; Van de Sanden 63'

Kyocera Stadion, Den Haag
Attendance: 6,658
Referee: Kateryna Monzul (Ukraine)

5 March 2016
19:30

Norway	4–1	Netherlands
Haavi 30'; Mjelde 61'; Ad. Hegerberg 82', 90+1'	Report	Melis 67'

Het Kasteel, Rotterdam
Attendance: 10,599
Referee: Teodora Albon (Romania)
5 March 2016
19:30

Sweden	1–0	Switzerland
Seger 44'	Report

Stadion Woudestein, Rotterdam
Referee: Katalin Kulcsár (Hungary)

9 March 2016
19:30

Switzerland	2–1	Norway
Mauron 32'; Kiwic 90+3'	Report	C. Hansen 10'

Stadion Woudestein, Rotterdam
Referee: Teodora Albon (Romania)
9 March 2016
19:30

Netherlands	1–1	Sweden
Miedema 5'	Report	Schough 45'

Het Kasteel, Rotterdam
Referee: Kateryna Monzul (Ukraine)

== Goalscorers ==
2 goals

- (Netherlands) Manon Melis
- (Netherlands) Vivianne Miedema
- (Norway) Ada Hegerberg
- (Switzerland) Rahel Kiwic

1 goal

- (Netherlands) Mandy van den Berg
- (Netherlands) Shanice van de Sanden
- (Norway) Emilie Haavi
- (Norway) Caroline Graham Hansen
- (Norway) Maren Mjelde
- (Sweden) Lisa Dahlkvist
- (Sweden) Olivia Schough
- (Sweden) Caroline Seger
- (Switzerland) Ramona Bachmann
- (Switzerland) Fabienne Humm
- (Switzerland) Sandrine Mauron

== Qualified teams for Olympics ==
After the conclusion of the qualifying tournament, the following three teams from UEFA qualified for the Olympic football tournament.

Team	Qualified on	Previous appearances in tournament^{1}
France	22 June 2015	1 (2012)
Germany	22 June 2015	4 (1996, 2000, 2004, 2008)
Sweden	9 March 2016	5 (1996, 2000, 2004, 2008, 2012)

^{1} Bold indicates champion for that year. Italic indicates host for that year.
