= Petronella Ekroth =

Swedish footballer (born 1989)

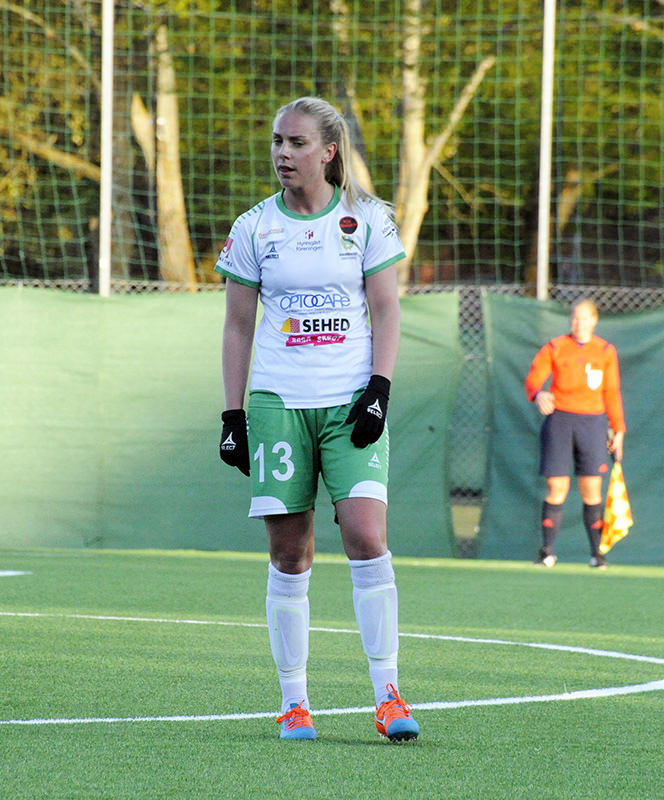

Personal information
- Full name: Hilda Petronella Ekroth
- Date of birth: 12 December 1989 (age 36)
- Place of birth: Askim, Sweden
- Height: 1.75 m (5 ft 9 in)
- Position: Defender

Youth career
- Rödsle BK

Senior career*
| Years | Team | Apps | (Gls) |
| 2009 | Linköping | 3 | (0) |
| 2010–2011 | Tyresö | 10 | (0) |
| 2010 | → AIK (loan) | 7 | (0) |
| 2011–2012 | Jitex | 6 | (0) |
| 2013–2015 | Hammarby IF | 52 | (5) |
| 2016–2018 | Djurgårdens IF | 57 | (0) |
| 2018–2019 | Juventus | 12 | (2) |
| 2019 | Djurgårdens IF | 12 | (1) |
| 2020 | Roma | 4 | (0) |
| 2020–2021 | Hammarby IF | 6 | (0) |
- * Club domestic league appearances and goals as of 13 December 2021

Hilda Petronella Ekroth (born 12 December 1989) is a Swedish footballer who plays as a defender.

== Club career ==
Ekroth started her football career in the Damallsvenskan playing for Djurgårdens IF. She followed this with years at Linköpings FC, AIK, Tyresö FF, Jitex BK, Hammarby IF and Djurgårdens IF.

After spending her entire professional career playing in Sweden, Ekroth signed with Juventus in Italy on 17 July 2018. Following one year in Italy Ekroth resigned to her former Djurgården on 10 July 2019.

In 2020, Ekroth returned to Hammarby IF in Elitettan, Sweden's second tier, and the club immediately got promoted back to Allsvenskan. Ekroth suffered an anterior cruciate ligament injury that kept her sidelined throughout the whole 2021 season, before she left the club at the end of the year.

== International career ==
Ekroth has represented Sweden in several youth national team levels, gaining over 30 caps in the process.

== Personal life ==
Ekroth's mother Yvonne is a football coach and Ekroth played for her during her time at Djurgården. Her younger brother Oliver Ekroth also plays football, for Swedish club side Degerfors IF in the men's Allsvenskan. Outside of her playing career, Ekroth has worked in football as a commentator and studio analyst for Eurosport.

== We Play Strong ==
Ekroth is one of UEFA's official ambassadors for #WePlayStrong, a social media and vlogging campaign which was launched in 2018. The series, which originally included professional footballers Sarah Zadrazil, Eunice Beckmann, Laura Feiersinger and Lisa Evans and now also includes Ekroth and Shanice van de Sanden, follows the daily lives of female professional footballers. The campaign's "...aim is to promote women's football as much as we can and to make people aware of women's football, really," Evans explains. "The ultimate goal is to make football the most played sport by females by 2020. So it's a UEFA initiative to get more women and girls playing football, whether they want to be professional or not."

== Honours ==
- Damallsvenskan:

Champion: 2009,

- Supercupen:

Champion: 2010

- Seria A:

Champion: 2018–19

- Coppa Italia:

Champion: 2019
