= Deryneia =

Deryneia: Δερύνεια (Greek); Derinya (Turkish)
- Municipality
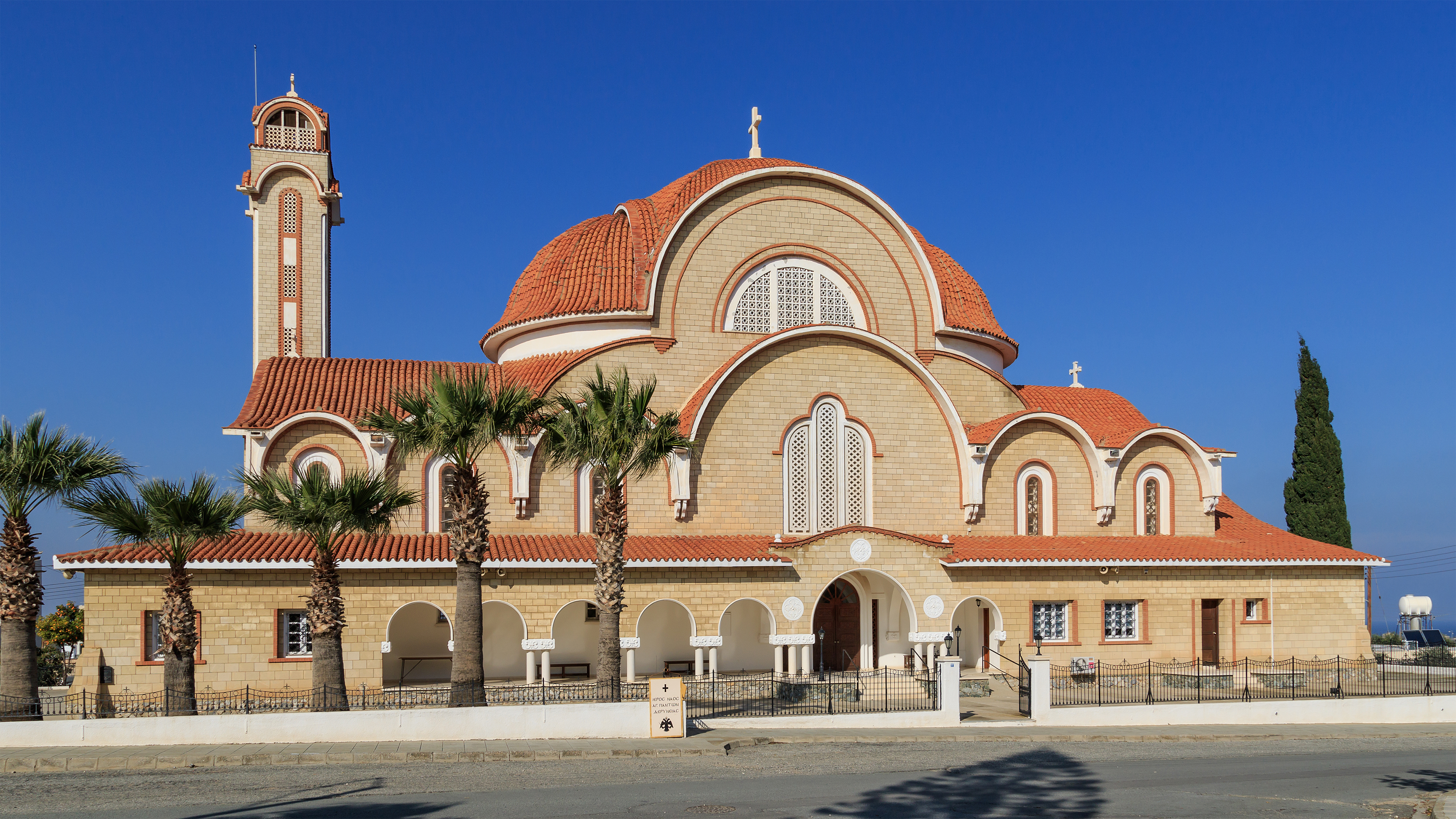
- All Saints Church, Deryneia

- Location within Cyprus
- Coordinates: 35°03′20″N 33°57′25″E
- Country: Cyprus
- District: Famagusta

Government
  - Mayor: Andros Karayiannis

Population (2011)
  - Total: 5,758
- Time zone: UTC+2 (EET)
  - Summer (DST): EEST
- Postal code: 5380
- Website: http://www.deryneia.org.cy

Deryneia (Greek: Δερύνεια; Turkish: Derinya) is a large village in the island of Cyprus. It is located on the east side of the island, 2 km (1 mi) south of the city of Famagusta. The population of the village is 5,758 (October 2011 census) and it consists of a municipality since 1994. The current mayor is Andros Karayiannis. Since the 1974 Turkish invasion of Cyprus, around 75% of the village terrain is in Northern Cyprus. The village is 12 kilometers from the famous resort of Ayia Napa. The "Ghost Town" of Varosha can be clearly viewed from the roof of the Cultural Centre, as can the craters from shells fired during the invasion in the field opposite.

The village has agricultural land around it, and is one of the "Kokkinochoria" (red villages) so called from the red soil. Potatoes are widely grown but Deryneia is famous for its strawberries and holds a biennial strawberry festival at the football ground of Anagennisi Deryneia on the Dherynia to Sotira road.

== Historical background ==
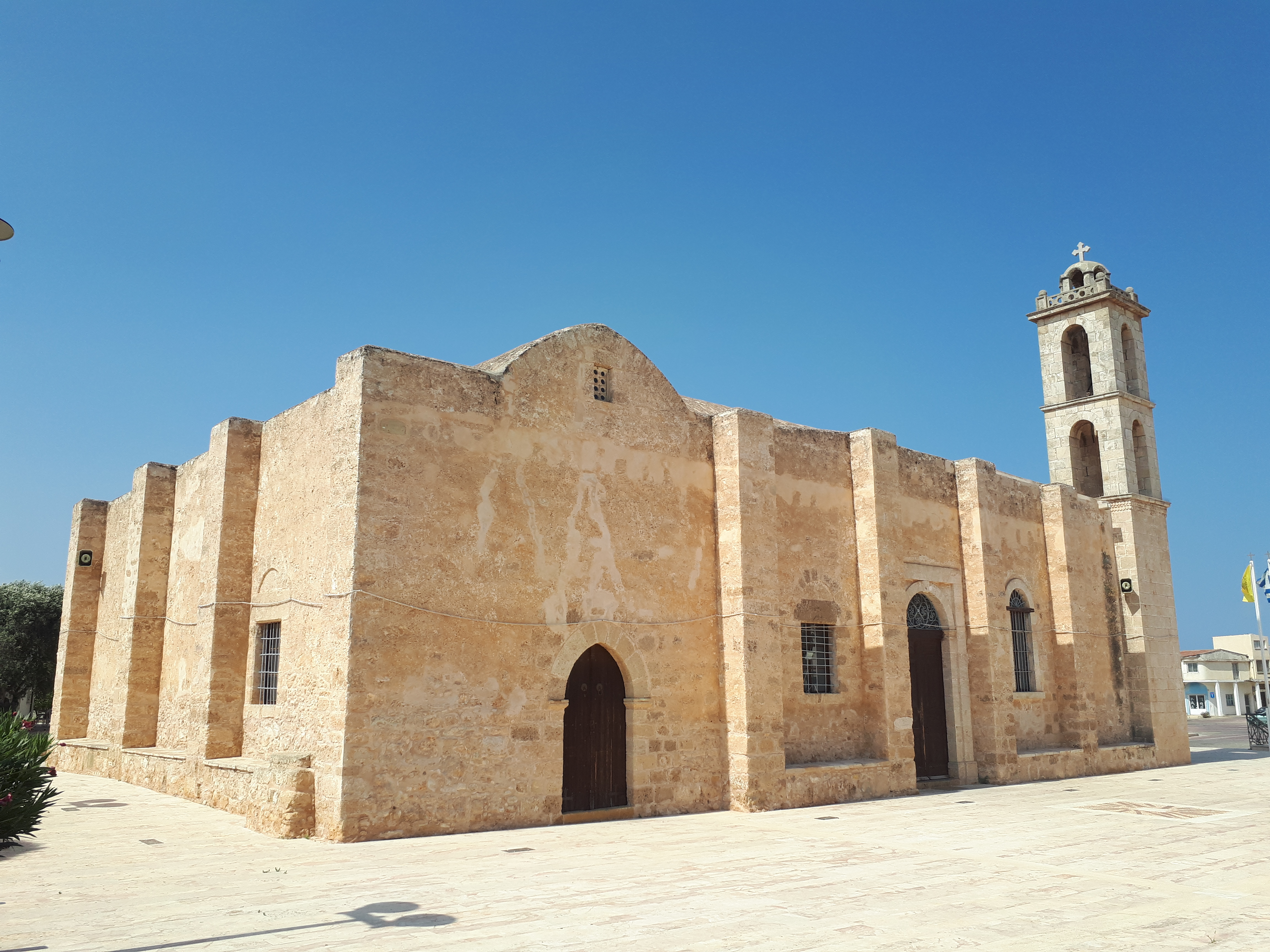
Virgin Mary Nativity Church was built in the 15th or 16th century

According to data and information available, Dherynia is in this position for about 700 years. But it turns out the archaeological sites and monuments in the occupied area and the buffer zone that the history of Deryneia is much greater.

We do not know exactly why the area was named "Dherynia". Simos Menardos and Mr J. Goodwin in his book, argue that settlers settled there, perhaps after the Trojan War, the ancient city that was Gerineia near Pylos, Peloponnese and was the capital of the Kingdom of the famous and prudent King Nestor, which Homer calls GERINION, came from Gerinia. The above, embraces and Nearchus Clerides in his book,"Villages States and Cyprus." Another version is that the name came from the name of an English or Frankish general who once camped in the "mountains" of Dheryneia. The above and other aspects included in the study Deryneioti composer - Mr. Adamou researcher Katsantoni issued in 1991.

What today we can consider as evidence to support his claim to the name of Deryneia is that between the southeast and Deryneia and beach is located on ancient village called Therimeio or Therineio. Later became "Drynio", "Dryneia" and finally "Dherynia.

== Current form ==
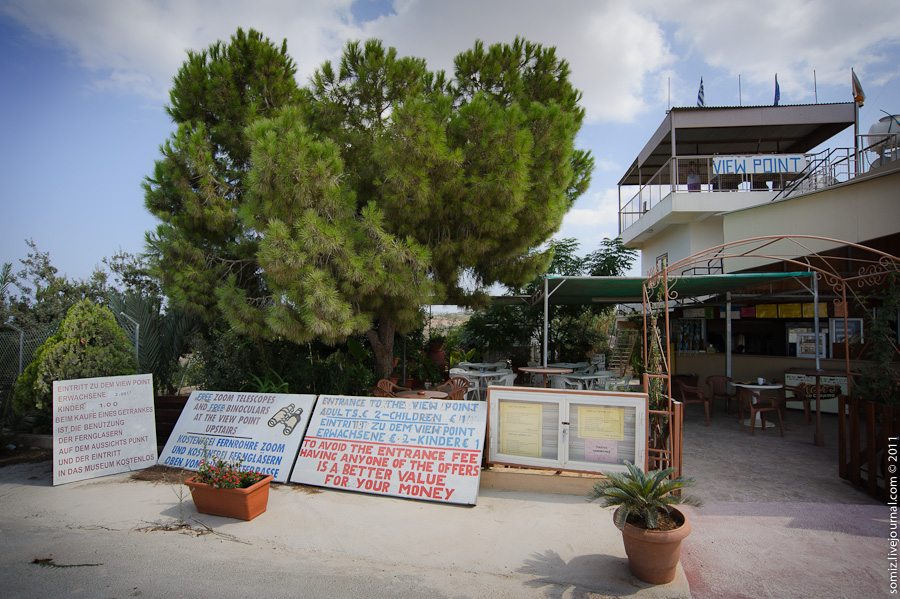
A view point towards Famagusta

ِDeryneia is a town on the east coast of Cyprus, near the bay of Famagusta. It is located near the city of Famagusta and the historic site of Salamis.

It is only 5 kilometers from Famagusta and 2 km from the sea with the golden sand.

The mesh of Attila in 1974 has a result that the 70% of the municipality is occupied and all residents have lost their property.

The population of the municipality is approximately 7,500 people. This figure includes the 1,000 refugees living in a refugee settlement in Deryneia and excludes 3,000 refugees inhabitants of occupied "Kato", or "Down Deryneia" where refugees scattered throughout Cyprus and abroad.

Although the consequences of the Turkish invasion hindered the progress and development of the area both economically as commercially and in tourism area, however due to the progressiveness and industriousness of its inhabitants and the efforts of individual Local Authorities and organized the municipality became possible to develop Dherynia in a great level .

Residents of the City are farmers or are employed in the tourism industry of Agia Napa and Protaras, trade, processing and crafts.

The farmers involved in the cultivation of early vegetables and especially the cultivation of strawberries.

In the field of culture Dherynia has created and maintains a long tradition. Ranks among the first communities founded dance, theater and music groups.

Also in the field of sport, Deryneia boasts great successes. The Athletic Association "Anagennisi (Renaissance)" founded in 1920 ranks among the historic clubs in Cyprus, maintains football and volleyball teams for men and women. The National Association "Christodoulou Dimitrakis' has a futsal team in first division. The Dherynia athletes has made a national and worldwide with great success in athletics and shooting.

The offer of Deryneia is also strong in the National Games. Brought to the ideals of democracy and freedom of young people, responding to the calls of the small country have offered their lives in the struggle for freedom.

Deryneia has several monuments, landmarks and points of reference, such as Byzantine churches, Folklore Museum, Monuments Heroes, Outdoor Amphitheatre, Sports Centre, City Park, City Hall, the Cultural Centre of Occupied Famagusta.

Despite the difficulties with the occupation and semi-occupation of Deryneia, progress and growth led to the upgrading of local government. From Improvement Board which functioned until January 6, 1994 upgraded to municipality after a referendum held on June 6, 1993 and percentage 74.70% of residents voted to upgrade the Community Council.

== Strawberry Festival ==
Deryneia is directly connected with the cultivation of strawberries after the first strawberry plantations on commercial basis in Cyprus cultured in Derynia of the pioneer farmer m.Mitsio Giannoukou 55 years ago. Today despite the occupation and the loss of 70% of the region following the tragic events of 1974, Deryneia is still by far the first in the cultivation and production of strawberries in Cyprus, both in quantity and in quality. The Pancyprian Strawberry Festival was organized by the Municipality in 1999 and is presented every 2 years. This Festival is about showcasing the innovative culture of the strawberry and the distribution of the product and by-products in conjunction with the presentation of quality cultural and artistic programmes. Thousands visitors the festival and locals are offered free fresh strawberries and various preparations of strawberries as juice, jams, liqueurs, sweets, ice creams etc. that the strawberry producers and their spouses prepare. Organized entire municipality operate booths at the festival featuring food and drinks, and guests are able to enjoy the spectacular fireworks and throwing lavish artistic program .

== Mayors ==
- 2012 - date, Andros Karayiannis
- 2001 - 2011, Antreas Shiapanis
- 1994 - 2001, Flora Ioannou

== Gallery ==
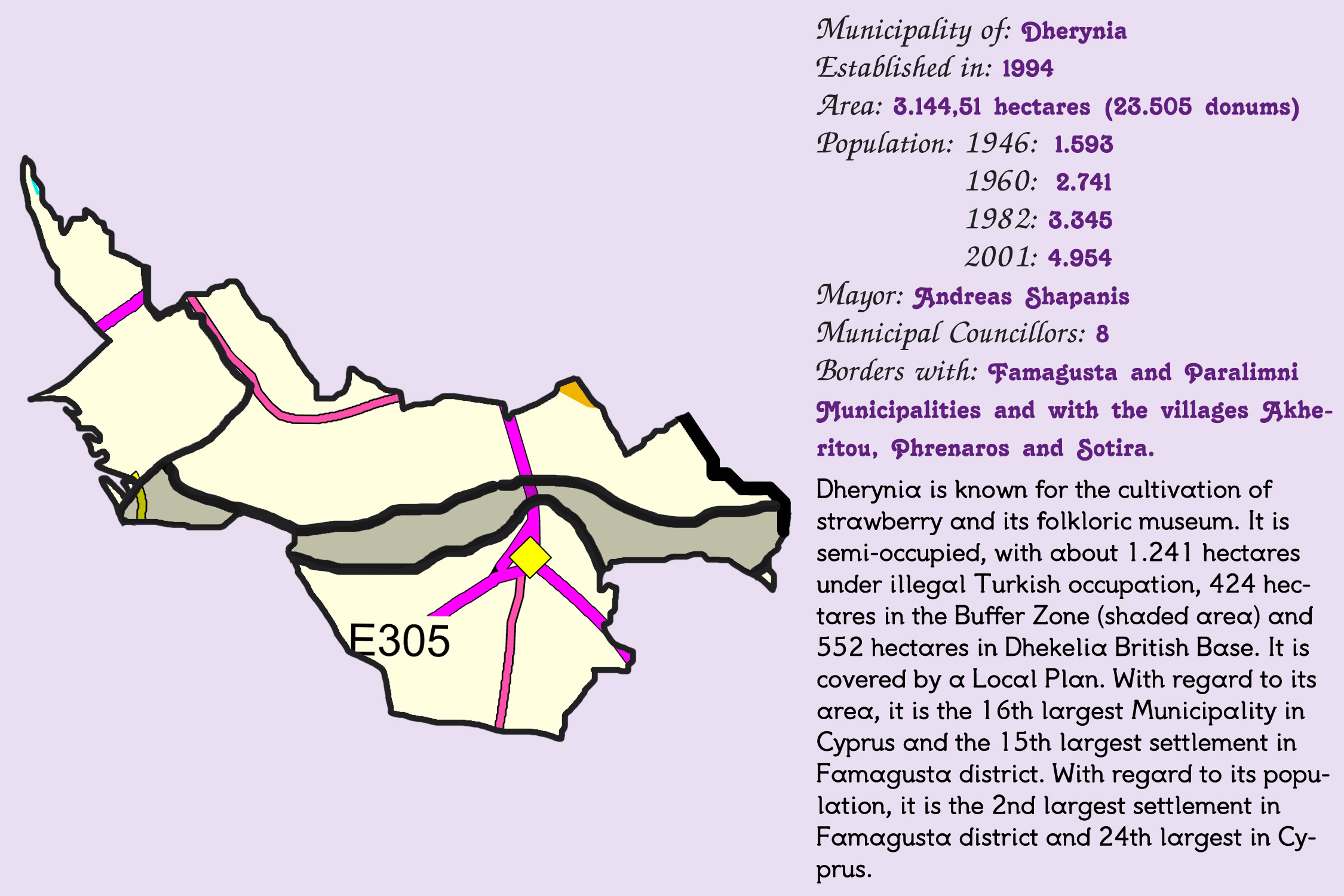
Concise presentation of Deryneia

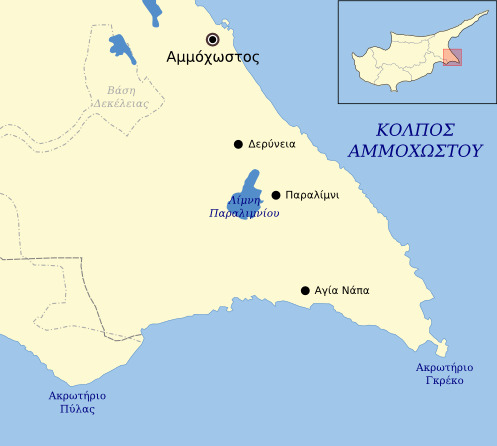
Deryneia and its surrounding area
