= Barbora Votíková =

Czech footballer (born 1996)

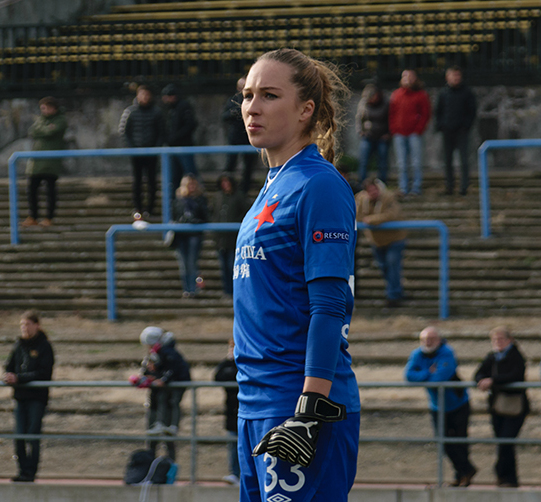
- Votíková with Slavia Prague in 2017

Personal information
- Date of birth: 13 September 1996 (age 30)
- Place of birth: Plzeň, Czech Republic
- Height: 1.78 m (5 ft 10 in)
- Position: Goalkeeper

Team information
- Current team: Slavia Prague
- Number: 33

Youth career
- TJ Sokol Plasy
- Viktoria Plzeň

Senior career*
| Years | Team | Apps | (Gls) |
| 2013–2014 | Viktoria Plzeň | | |
| 2014–2021 | Slavia Prague | 59 | (0) |
| 2021–2023 | Paris Saint-Germain | 13 | (0) |
| 2023–2024 | Tottenham Hotspur | 6 | (0) |
| 2024– | Slavia Prague | 22 | (0) |
| 2026 | → Arsenal (loan) | 0 | (0) |

International career^{‡}
| 2009–2011 | Czech Republic U17 | 2 | (0) |
| 2014–2015 | Czech Republic U19 | 7 | (0) |
| 2014– | Czech Republic | 56 | (0) |
- * Club domestic league appearances and goals as of 8 November 2025 ‡ National team caps and goals as of 2 December 2025

Barbora Votíková (born 13 September 1996) is a Czech professional footballer who plays as a goalkeeper for Czech Women's First League club Slavia Prague and the Czech Republic national team. Known as Bára, she is also a YouTuber.

== Club career ==
Born in Plasy, Votíková started her youth career with local club TJ Sokol Plasy at 8 years old, where she played with boys. She moved to youth academy of Viktoria Plzeň later. In 2013 at the age of 17, she started to play for club's senior team.

In 2014, Votíková joined Slavia Prague with whom she played in UEFA Women's Champions League for the first time. During 2017–18 season, she helped her club reach the quarter-finals of Champions League.

On 25 August 2021, French club Paris Saint-Germain signed Votíková on a two-year deal.

In April 2022, Votíková suffered an ACL rupture in her right knee and did not play for the remainder of the season. Votíková returned after her injury in February 2023, playing a friendly match against Paris FC.

On 8 June 2023, Paris Saint-Germain announced that Votíková would be leaving the club as her contract expired.

On 17 August 2023, Votíková signed a two-year contract with English club Tottenham Hotspur. She made her first league start against rivals Arsenal on 16 December 2023, keeping a clean sheet and winning player of the match.

On 15 August 2024, Votíková signed a three-year contract with Slavia Prague.

On 3 February 2026, Votíková joined Women's Super League club Arsenal on a half-year loan deal. On 4 June 2026, she returned to Slavia Prague.

== International career ==
Votíková is a former Czech youth international. She appeared for under-19 team at qualification stage of 2014 and 2015 UEFA Women's Under-19 Championship. She made her senior team debut on 28 October 2014, by coming on as a half-time substitute for Radka Bednaříková in a 1–1 draw against Poland.

== Outside football ==
Votíková started her YouTube channel on 12 April 2015. In 2021, Forbes magazine ranked her sixth in most paid YouTubers from Czech Republic. She also appeared in Czech films such as Pepa (2018) and Cena za štěstí (2019). From July 2021 to October 2024, Votíková held a fashion company named Barbes with her former girlfriend, poker player Barbora Mlejnková. Since March 2022 Votíková has her own company Barawood.

== Personal life ==
In 2019, a book called Bára Votíková: Trochu jinak (lit. 'Bára Votíková: A Little Different') written by herself was published. She came out as lesbian in the book.

== Career statistics ==
=== International ===
As of match played 2 December 2025

Appearances and goals by national team and year
| National team | Year | Apps | Goals |
|---|---|---|---|
| Czech Republic | 2014 | 1 | 0 |
| Czech Republic | 2015 | 0 | 0 |
| Czech Republic | 2016 | 3 | 0 |
| Czech Republic | 2017 | 5 | 0 |
| Czech Republic | 2018 | 7 | 0 |
| Czech Republic | 2019 | 5 | 0 |
| Czech Republic | 2020 | 5 | 0 |
| Czech Republic | 2021 | 7 | 0 |
| Czech Republic | 2022 | 3 | 0 |
| Czech Republic | 2023 | 2 | 0 |
| Czech Republic | 2024 | 8 | 0 |
| Czech Republic | 2025 | 10 | 0 |
| Total | | 56 | 0 |

== Honours ==
Slavia Prague

- Czech Women's First League: 2014–15, 2015–16, 2016–17, 2019–20
- Czech Women's Cup: 2015–16

Paris Saint-Germain

- Coupe de France féminine: 2021–22
