= 2013–14 Czech Women's First League =

Czech Women's First League
- Season: 2013–14
- Champions: Slavia Praha
- Promoted: Slovan Liberec
- Relegated: Baník Ostrava
- Champions League: Slavia Praha; Sparta Praha
- Top goalscorer: Petra Divišová
- Biggest home win: Slovácko 9-0 Ostrava
- Biggest away win: Ostrava 0-9 Slavia; Plzeň 0-9 Slavia

The 2013–14 Czech Women's First League is the 21st season of the Czech Republic's top-tier football league for women. Sparta Praha were the defending champions. For the first time two teams qualify to the Champions League, because the Czech Republic entered the top eight nations in the UEFA Coefficients for women.

The championship was won by Slavia for the third time, and the first time since 2004. Slavia's win over Sparta at the penultimate matchday ended their nine-year-long title streak.

== Format ==
The eight teams will play each other twice for a total of 14 matches per team. After that the top four teams will play a championship round for another six matches per team. The bottom placed four teams play the relegation round. Points accumulated after the regular season are halved, and points from the next round are added. The champion and runners-up qualify for the UEFA Women's Champions League.

== Regular season ==
=== Standings ===
The regular season ended on 16 April 2014.

Pos	Team	Pld	W	D	L	GF	GA	GD	Pts	Qualification or relegation
1	Slavia Praha	14	12	2	0	73	7	+66	38	Qualification for championship group
2	Sparta Praha	14	11	1	2	48	7	+41	34	Qualification for championship group
3	Slovácko	14	8	2	4	29	16	+13	26	Qualification for championship group
4	Bohemians Praha	14	6	1	7	21	24	−3	19	Qualification for championship group
5	Hradec Králové	14	5	3	6	17	38	−21	18	Qualification for relegation group
6	Viktoria Plzeň	14	3	5	6	8	28	−20	14	Qualification for relegation group
7	Pardubice	14	0	4	10	6	40	−34	4	Qualification for relegation group
8	Baník Ostrava	14	0	4	10	6	48	−42	4	Qualification for relegation group

=== Results ===
Home \ Away	BOH	HRK	OST	PAR	SLA	SLO	SPA	VPL
Bohemians		1–2	2–0	5–1	1–4	0–1	0–2	1–1
Hradec Králové	0–3		3–1	0–0	2–6	1–0	0–4	2–2
Baník Ostrava	1–4	1–2		2–2	0–9	0–3	0–6	0–0
Pardubice	0–1	1–2	1–1		0–7	0–1	0–6	1–1
Slavia Praha	7–0	8–0	5–0	6–0		6–2	2–0	2–0
Slovácko	2–1	2–2	9–0	1–0	2–2		4–2	2–0
Sparta Praha	3–0	7–1	2–0	6–0	0–0	1–0		8–0
Viktoria Plzeň	1–1	2–0	3–2	1–0	0–9	1–0	0–1	

Legend: Blue = home team win; Yellow = draw; Red = away team win.

== Final stage ==
Points of the regular season were halved and rounded up, goal difference was kept.

=== Championship group ===
Played by the teams placed first to fourth of the regular season. Teams play each other twice.

Pos	Team	Pld	W	D	L	GF	GA	GD	Pts	Qualification or relegation	SLA	SPA	BOH	SLO
1	Slavia Praha (C)	6	5	0	1	102	17	+85	34	Qualification to Champions League		1–2	2–1	8–0
2	Sparta Praha	6	5	0	1	73	12	+61	32	Qualification to Champions League	2–3		8–1	1–0
3	Bohemians	6	2	0	4	31	45	−14	16		4–6	0–5		3–0
4	Slovácko	6	0	0	6	30	45	−15	13		1–9	0–7	0–1	

Source: fotbal.cz
Legend: Blue = home team win; Yellow = draw; Red = away team win.
(C) Champions

=== Relegation group ===
Played by the teams placed fifth to eighth of the regular season. Teams play each other twice.

Pos	Team	Pld	W	D	L	GF	GA	GD	Pts	Qualification or relegation
5	Viktoria Plzeň	6	3	1	2	19	35	−16	17	
6	Hradec Králové	6	2	3	1	22	48	−26	18	
7	Pardubice	6	3	1	2	10	44	−34	12	
8	Baník Ostrava (R)	6	2	1	3	14	55	−41	9	Relegation to 2014–15 II.liga

Source: nv.fotbal.cz
(R) Relegated

== Personnel and kits ==
Note: Flags indicate national team as has been defined under FIFA eligibility rules. Players may hold more than one non-FIFA nationality.

Team	Manager	Captain	Kit manufacturer	Shirt sponsor
Baník Ostrava	(Czech Republic) Aleš Döme	(Czech Republic) Taťána Michnová	Nike	Deník
Hradec Králové	(Czech Republic) Petr Kincl	(Czech Republic) Veronika Benešová	Adidas	—
Slavia Praha	(Czech Republic) Anton Mišovec	(Czech Republic) Blanka Pěničková	Umbro	—
Slovácko	(Czech Republic) Petr Vlachovský	(Czech Republic) Petra Polášková	Kappa	Neoklas
Sparta Praha	(Czech Republic) Jan Podolák	(Czech Republic) Iva Mocová	Nike	Fortuna
Viktoria Plzeň	(Czech Republic) Karel Fajfrlík	(Czech Republic) Eva Bohmannová	Alea	—
Bohemians Praha	(Czech Republic) Jiří Dědič	(Slovakia) Lucia Ondrušová	Adidas	GHC Genetics
Pardubice	(Czech Republic) Petr Šmeral	(Czech Republic) Kateřina Urbancová	Jako	—
