= Lucie Hloupá =

Czech footballer

Personal information
- Full name: Lucie Hloupá
- Date of birth: 27 February 1996 (age 30)
- Place of birth: Jablonec nad Nisou, Czech Republic
- Height: 1.70 m (5 ft 7 in)
- Position: Midfielder

Youth career
- FK Baumit Jablonec
- 2009–2013: Sparta Praha

Senior career*
Years	Team	Apps	(Gls)
2013–2015	Sparta Praha	11	(3)
2016–2017	Slavia Praha		

International career
2014–2017	Czech Republic	1	(0)
- * Club domestic league appearances and goals

Lucie Hloupá is a Czech former football midfielder who last played for Slavia Praha in the Czech First Division. She was voted talent of the year at the 2012 Czech Footballer of the Year (women), Hloupá played for the Czech national team in 2014.

== International career ==
She made her debut for the national team on 7 May 2014 in a FIFA World Cup qualification match against Romania.

Goals for the Czech WNT in official competitions
Competition	Stage	Date	Location	Opponent	Goals	Result	Overall
2015 FIFA World Cup	Qualifiers	2014–06–18	Prague	North Macedonia	1	5–2	1

== Career honours ==
=== Club ===
- Czech First Division (3): 2012-13, 2015-16, 2016-17
- Czech Cup (3): 2012–13, 2014–15, 2015–16

=== Individual ===
- Talent of the Year: 2012
