= 2012–13 Czech Women's First League =

Czech Women's First League
- Season: 2012–13
- Champions: Sparta Praha (18th title)
- Promoted: FK Bohemians Prague
- Relegated: Brno
- UEFA Women's Champions League: Sparta Praha
- Matches: 20
- Goals: 109 (5.45 per match)
- Top goalscorer: Petra Divišová
- Biggest home win: Sparta 10–0 Plzeň
- Biggest away win: Plzeň 0–13 Slavia

The 2012–13 Czech Women's First League was the 20th season of the Czech Republic's top-tier football league for women. Sparta Praha were the defending champions and successfully defended their title.

== Format ==
The eight teams will play each other twice for a total of 14 matches per team. After that the top four teams will play a championship round for another six matches per team. The bottom placed four teams play the relegation round. Points accumulated after the regular season are halved and added the points from the next round. The champion qualifies for the UEFA Champions League.

== Regular season ==
=== Standings ===
Pos	Team	Pld	W	D	L	GF	GA	GD	Pts	Qualification or relegation
1	Sparta Praha	14	13	1	0	68	4	+64	40	Qualification for championship group
2	Slavia Praha	14	12	1	1	80	8	+72	37	Qualification for championship group
3	Hradec Králové	14	8	2	4	23	27	−4	26	Qualification for championship group
4	Viktoria Plzeň	14	7	1	6	22	43	−21	22	Qualification for championship group
5	Slovácko	14	6	2	6	36	31	+5	20	Qualification for relegation group
6	Brno	14	2	2	10	14	53	−39	8	Qualification for relegation group
7	Baník Ostrava	14	1	2	11	4	47	−43	5	Qualification for relegation group
8	Pardubice	14	1	1	12	9	43	−34	4	Qualification for relegation group

=== Results ===
Home \ Away	BRN	HRK	OST	PAR	SLA	SLO	SPA	VPL
Brno		0–2	4–1	3–1	0–9	0–3	0–3	1–3
Hradec Králové	4–0		2–0	4–1	0–5	2–1	0–2	2–1
Baník Ostrava	0–0	1–1		0–2	0–9	1–6	0–8	0–1
Pardubice	2–2	0–1	0–1		0–4	2–8	0–2	0–3
Slavia Praha	6–1	7–0	4–0	6–0		4–1	1–1	4–1
Slovácko	7–1	2–2	3–0	2–1	0–6		0–5	2–4
Sparta Praha	10–1	6–0	5–0	4–0	4–2	2–0		10–0
Viktoria Plzeň	2–1	1–3	2–0	3–0	0–13	1–1	0–6	

Legend: Blue = home team win; Yellow = draw; Red = away team win.

== Final stage ==
Points of the regular season were halved and rounded up, goal difference was kept.

=== Championship group ===
Played by the teams placed first to fourth of the regular season. Teams play each other twice.

Pos	Team	Pld	W	D	L	GF	GA	GD	Pts	Qualification or relegation	SPA	SLA	HRK	VPL
1	Sparta Praha (C)	20	19	1	0	85	5	+80	38	Qualification to Champions League		1–0	4–0	3–0
2	Slavia Praha	20	16	1	3	113	12	+101	31		1–2		4–0	10–0
3	Hradec Králové	20	8	3	9	25	48	−23	14		0–3	0–7		1–2
4	Viktoria Plzeň	20	8	2	10	26	73	−47	15		0–4	1–11	1–1	

Legend: Blue = home team win; Yellow = draw; Red = away team win.
(C) Champions

=== Relegation group ===
Played by the teams placed fifth to eighth of the regular season. Teams play each other twice.

Pos	Team	Pld	W	D	L	GF	GA	GD	Pts	Qualification or relegation	SLO	OST	PAR	BRN
5	Slovácko	20	10	3	7	58	40	+18	23			4–1	7–0	4–4
6	Baník Ostrava	20	3	3	14	11	53	−42	10		2–0		4–0	0–0
7	Pardubice	20	4	1	15	16	59	−43	11		0–3	1–0		2–0
8	Brno (R)	20	3	4	13	24	67	−43	9	Qualification for relegation play-offs	3–4	1–0	2–4	

Legend: Blue = home team win; Yellow = draw; Red = away team win.
(R) Relegated

== Relegation play-off ==
Eighth place Brno played a two-legged play-off against FK Bohemians Prague. Bohemians had won the second league promotion play-off against Olomouc 6–4 on aggregate. FK Bohemians Prague then won the relegation play-off 2–2 (4-3 on penalties) on aggregate and promoted to the first division.

16 June 2013
17:00

Brno	0 – 2	FK Bohemians Prague
	Report	Havlová 24'; Šmidrkalová 35'

SK Vojkovice, Brno-venkov
19 June 2013
17:30

FK Bohemians Prague	0 - 2	Brno
	Report	Svobodová 5'; Bezděková 40'
Penalties
Tůmová (penalty scored); Havlová (penalty scored); Týlová (penalty scored); Ondrušová (penalty missed); Čulová (penalty scored)	4 - 3	Fritzová (penalty missed); Veselá (penalty scored); Soušková (penalty scored); Špičková (penalty scored); Bezděková (penalty missed)

SK Prosek, Praha

== Personnel and kits ==
Note: Flags indicate national team as has been defined under FIFA eligibility rules. Players may hold more than one non-FIFA nationality.

Team	Manager	Captain	Kit manufacturer	Shirt sponsor
Baník Ostrava	(Czech Republic) Aleš Döme	(Czech Republic) Taťána Michnová	Nike	Deník
Hradec Králové	(Czech Republic) Petr Kincl	(Czech Republic) Veronika Benešová	Adidas	—
Slavia Praha	(Czech Republic) Jan Bauer	(Czech Republic) Blanka Pěničková	Umbro	—
Slovácko	(Czech Republic) Petr Vlachovský	(Czech Republic) Petra Polášková	Kappa	Neoklas
Sparta Praha	(Czech Republic) Luboš Žovinec	(Czech Republic) Iva Mocová	Nike	Fortuna
Viktoria Plzeň	(Czech Republic) Karel Fajfrlík	(Czech Republic) Eva Bohmannová	Alea	—
Zbrojovka Brno	(Czech Republic) Michal Hanzl	(Czech Republic) Monika Šilhárová	Umbro	—
Pardubice	(Czech Republic) Petr Šmeral	(Czech Republic) Michaela Krejcarová	Jako	—

== Top scorers ==
Final standing

Rank	Scorer	Club	Goals
1	(Czech Republic) Petra Divišová	Slavia Praha	23
2	(Czech Republic) Tereza Kožárová	Slavia Praha	20
3	(Czech Republic) Blanka Pěničková	Slavia Praha	13
3	(Czech Republic) Lucie Voňková	Sparta Praha	13
4	(Czech Republic) Zdeňka Skupinová	Slovácko	11
5	(Czech Republic) Lucie Martínková	Sparta Praha	8
5	(Czech Republic) Adéla Pivoňková	Sparta Praha	8
5	(Czech Republic) Eliška Šturmová	Sparta Praha	8
6	(Czech Republic) Irena Martínková	Sparta Praha	6
7	3 players		5

Source: fotbal.cz
