= 2021–22 Czech Women's First League =

Czech football season

Czech Women's First League
- Season: 2021–22
- Champions: Slavia Prague
- Promoted: Baník Ostrava
- Relegated: Pardubice
- Champions League: Slavia Prague; Sparta Prague; Slovácko
- Matches: 80
- Goals: 350 (4.38 per match)
- Top goalscorer: Lucie Martínková (24)
- Biggest home win: Sparta Prague 13–0 Dukla Prague
- Biggest away win: Pardubice 0–16 Sparta Prague
- Highest scoring: Pardubice 0–16 Sparta Prague
- Longest winning run: 18 matches Slavia Prague
- Longest unbeaten run: 18 matches Slavia Prague
- Longest winless run: 9 matches Dukla Prague
- Longest losing run: 9 matches Dukla Prague
- Highest attendance: 500; Slavia Prague 4–0 Sparta Prague
- Lowest attendance: 20; Dukla Prague 1–2 Liberec; Sparta Prague 2–0 Slovácko; Liberec 4–0 Pardubice
- All statistics correct as of 14 May 2022.

The 2021–22 Czech Women's First League was the 29th season of the Czech Republic's top-tier football league for women. Sparta Prague were the defending champions.

== Format ==
The eight teams played each other twice for a total of 14 matches per team. After that the top four teams played a championship round for another six matches per team. The bottom placed four teams played the relegation round. The champions, runners-up and third-placed teams qualified for the 2022–23 UEFA Women's Champions League.

== Teams ==
Team	Home town	Home ground
Pardubice	Pardubice	Pod Vinicí
Dukla Prague	Prague	Stadion Juliska
Lokomotiva Brno H. H.	Brno	Hrušovany u Brna
Slavia Prague	Prague	SK Horní Měcholupy
Slovan Liberec	Liberec	Městský stadion
Slovácko	Uherské Hradiště	Městský stadion
Sparta Prague	Prague	Strahov Stadium
Viktoria Plzeň	Plzeň	Dobřany

=== Stadia and locations ===
Location of teams in 2021–22 Czech Women's First League

== Regular season ==
=== Standings ===
The regular season ended on 13 March 2022.

Pos	Team	Pld	W	D	L	GF	GA	GD	Pts	Qualification or relegation
1	Slavia Prague	14	14	0	0	60	3	+57	42	Qualification for championship group
2	Sparta Prague	14	12	0	2	82	7	+75	36	Qualification for championship group
3	Slovácko	14	10	0	4	30	15	+15	30	Qualification for championship group
4	Lokomotiva Brno H. H.	14	4	2	8	18	38	−20	14	Qualification for championship group
5	Viktoria Plzeň	14	4	2	8	21	31	−10	14	Qualification for relegation group
6	Slovan Liberec	14	4	2	8	14	32	−18	14	Qualification for relegation group
7	Pardubice	14	2	2	10	17	64	−47	8	Qualification for relegation group
8	Dukla Prague	14	2	0	12	9	61	−52	6	Qualification for relegation group

Source: Soccerway
Rules for classification: 1) Points; 2) Goal difference; 3) Number of goals scored

=== Results ===
Home \ Away	LOK	DUK	PAR	SLA	SLO	SVK	SPA	VIK
Lokomotiva Brno H. H.		2–0	2–2	0–3	2–1	1–2	1–7	4–2
Dukla Prague	3–0		0–2	0–9	1–2	1–2	0–9	3–1
Pardubice	1–4	5–0		0–8	0–3	0–3	0–16	3–3
Slavia Prague	6–0	4–0	5–0		8–0	3–1	1–0	2–0
Slovan Liberec	2–2	2–1	3–2	0–4		0–1	0–1	1–2
Slovácko	4–0	4–0	4–0	1–2	2–0		1–6	1–0
Sparta Prague	3–0	13–0	9–0	1–2	6–0	2–1		5–1
Viktoria Plzeň	2–0	6–0	4–2	0–3	0–0	0–3	0–4	

Source: Soccerway
Legend: Blue = home team win; Yellow = draw; Red = away team win.

== Final stage ==
=== Championship group ===
Played by the teams placed first to fourth of the regular season. Teams play each other twice.

Pos	Team	Pld	W	D	L	GF	GA	GD	Pts	Qualification or relegation	SLA	SPA	SVK	LOK
1	Slavia Prague (C, Q)	6	5	0	1	21	3	+18	57	Qualification to Champions League second round		4–0	2–0	7–0
2	Sparta Prague (Q)	6	5	0	1	22	4	+18	51	Qualification to Champions League second round	3–0		2–0	8–0
3	Slovácko (Q)	6	2	0	4	9	8	+1	36	Qualification to Champions League first round	0–2	0–2		7–0
4	Lokomotiva Brno H. H.	6	0	0	6	0	37	−37	14		0–6	0–7	0–2	

Source: Soccerway
Legend: Blue = home team win; Yellow = draw; Red = away team win.
Rules for classification: 1) Points; 2) Goal difference; 3) Number of goals scored
(C) Champions; (Q) Qualified for the phase indicated

=== Relegation group ===
Played by the teams placed fifth to eighth of the regular season. Teams play each other twice.

Pos	Team	Pld	W	D	L	GF	GA	GD	Pts	Qualification or relegation	SLO	VIK	DUK	PAR
1	Liberec	6	6	0	0	21	2	+19	32			2–0	2–0	4–0
2	Viktoria Plzeň	6	3	0	3	17	8	+9	23		1–3		5–0	8–0
3	Dukla Prague	6	2	1	3	8	14	−6	13		1–4	3–2		1–1
4	Pardubice (R)	6	0	1	5	1	23	−22	9	Relegation to 2022–23 II.league	0–6	0–1	0–3	

Source: Soccerway
Legend: Blue = home team win; Yellow = draw; Red = away team win.
Rules for classification: 1) Points; 2) Goal difference; 3) Number of goals scored
(R) Relegated

== Personnel and kits ==
Note: Flags indicate national team as has been defined under FIFA eligibility rules. Players may hold more than one non-FIFA nationality.

Team	Manager	Captain	Kit manufacturer	Shirt sponsor
Slovan Liberec	(Czech Republic) Jiří Šisler	(Slovakia) Valentína Šušolová	Nike	Preciosa
Dukla Prague	(Czech Republic) Jakub Kowolowski	(Czech Republic) Michaela Beránková	Adidas	ProInterier
Slavia Prague	(Czech Republic) Michal Kolomazník	(Slovakia) Diana Bartovičová	Puma	eToro
Slovácko	(Czech Republic) Petr Bláha	(Czech Republic) Eliška Janíková	Puma	Z-Group
Sparta Prague	(Slovakia) Martin Masaryk	(Czech Republic) Petra Bertholdová	Adidas	—
Viktoria Plzeň	(Czech Republic) Daniel Prokop	(Czech Republic) Simona Pacandová	Macron	—
Lokomotiva Brno Horní Heršpice	(Czech Republic) Lukáš Zrzavý	(Czech Republic) Nikol Chlápková	Adidas	EXCLUSIA
Pardubice	(Czech Republic) Ondřej Bačo	(Czech Republic) Denisa Kupková	Lotto	ČPP

== Top goalscorers ==
Final standing

Rank	Scorer	Club	Goals
1	(Czech Republic) Lucie Martínková	Sparta Prague	24
2	(Czech Republic) Tereza Szewieczková	Slavia Prague	22
3	(Czech Republic) Michaela Dubcová	Slovácko	15
4	(Czech Republic) Klára Cvrčková	Sparta Prague	12
5	(Czech Republic) Miroslava Mrázová	Viktoria Plzeň	11
6	(Czech Republic) Aneta Pochmanová	Sparta Prague	10
