= 2026–27 Czech Women's First League =

Czech football season

Czech Women's First League
- Season: 2026–27
- Matches: 44
- Goals: 164 (3.73 per match)
- Biggest home win: Slavia Prague 9–0 Lokomotiva Brno
- Biggest away win: Slovácko 0–9 Slavia Prague
- Highest scoring: Slavia Prague 9–0 Lokomotiva Brno, Slovácko 0–9 Slavia Prague
- Longest winning run: 11; Slavia Prague
- Longest unbeaten run: 11; Slavia Prague
- Longest winless run: 11; Lokomotiva Brno
- Longest losing run: 11; Lokomotiva Brno
- Highest attendance: 2,023; Sparta Prague 1–2 Slavia Prague
- Lowest attendance: 68; Slovácko 2–0 Lokomotiva Brno
- All statistics correct as of 14 November 2026.

The 2026–27 Czech Women's First League is the 34th season of the Czech Republic's top-tier football league for women. Sparta Prague are the defending champions.

== Format ==
The eight teams played each other twice for a total of 14 matches per team. After that the top four teams played a championship round for another six matches per team. The bottom placed four teams played the relegation round. The champions and runners-up qualify for the 2027–28 UEFA Women's Champions League.

== Teams ==
Location of teams in 2026–27 Czech Women's First League

=== Team changes ===
Promoted from 2025–26 Czech Women's Second League	Relegated from 2025–26 Czech Women's First League
Prague Raptors	FC Prague

=== Stadiums ===
Team	Home town	Home ground	Capacity
Prague Raptors	Prague	Sportareál Satalice	
Baník Ostrava	Ostrava	Bazaly	
Lokomotiva Brno H. H.	Brno	Horní Heršpice	
Slavia Prague	Prague	SK Horní Měcholupy	1,000
Slovan Liberec	Liberec	Hrádek nad Nisou	
Slovácko	Uherské Hradiště	Městský stadion	8,121
Sparta Prague	Prague	Stadion SK Prosek	2,600
Viktoria Plzeň	Plzeň	Dobřany	

== Regular season ==
=== Standings ===
The regular season ended on 21 March 2027.

Pos	Team	Pld	W	D	L	GF	GA	GD	Pts	Qualification or relegation
1	Slavia Prague	11	11	0	0	52	2	+50	33	Qualification for championship group
2	Sparta Prague	11	8	0	3	36	10	+26	24	Qualification for championship group
3	Slovan Liberec	11	8	0	3	31	17	+14	24	Qualification for championship group
4	Viktoria Plzeň	11	5	1	5	14	21	−7	16	Qualification for championship group
5	Slovácko	11	4	1	6	11	31	−20	13	Qualification for relegation group
6	Prague Raptors	11	4	0	7	8	20	−12	12	Qualification for relegation group
7	Baník Ostrava	11	2	2	7	11	27	−16	8	Qualification for relegation group
8	Lokomotiva Brno H. H.	11	0	0	11	1	36	−35	0	Qualification for relegation group

Updated to match(es) played on 14 November 2026. Source: Soccerway
Rules for classification: 1) Points; 2) Goal difference; 3) Number of goals scored

=== Results ===
Home \ Away	LOK	OST	RAP	SLA	SLO	SVK	SPA	VIK
Lokomotiva Brno H. H.				1–4	0–2	0–1	0–2	0–2
Baník Ostrava	7–0		2–0	0–6	1–2	0–3		0–0
Prague Raptors	2–0	3–0			1–4		0–1	1–0
Slavia Prague	9–0	3–0	2–0		4–0		2–0	8–0
Slovan Liberec	2–0		4–0			5–0	1–6	5–1
Slovácko	2–0	1–1	0–1	0–9	1–5		0–3	
Sparta Prague		8–0	4–0	1–2	3–1	6–1		
Viktoria Plzeň	3–0	1–0	3–0	0–3		1–2	3–2	

Updated to match(es) played on 14 November 2026. Source:
Legend: Blue = home team win; Yellow = draw; Red = away team win.

== Managerial changes ==
During the season:

Team	Outgoing manager	Manner of departure	Date of vacancy	Match-week	Position in table	Replaced by	Date of appointment	Contract valid until
Sparta Prague	(Austria) Michael Steiner	Sacked	12 September 2026	5	2nd	(Netherlands) Jessica Torny	24 September 2026	Undisclosed
Baník Ostrava	(Czech Republic) Petr Kundrt	Sacked	26 October 2026	9	7th	(Czech Republic) Jana Blahová	26 October 2026	End of 2026

== Personnel and kits ==
Note: Flags indicate national team as has been defined under FIFA eligibility rules. Players may hold more than one non-FIFA nationality.

Team	Manager	Captain	Kit manufacturer	Shirt sponsor
Slovan Liberec	(Czech Republic) Jiří Kaiser	(Czech Republic) Denisa Tenkrátová	Nike	PREGIS
Baník Ostrava	(Czech Republic) Jana Blahová	(Czech Republic) Zuzana Obadalová	Macron	M&M reality
Slavia Prague	(Czech Republic) Filip Klapka	(Slovakia) Diana Bartovičová	Castore	eToro
Slovácko	(Czech Republic) Petr Posolda	(Czech Republic) Terezie Ohlídalová	Puma	Tipsport
Sparta Prague	(Netherlands) Jessica Torny	(Czech Republic) Eva Bartoňová	Adidas	Betano
Viktoria Plzeň	(Czech Republic) Ondřej Lokaj	(Czech Republic) Nikola Šotová	Macron	Tipsport
Lokomotiva Brno Horní Heršpice	(Czech Republic) Petr Maléř	(Czech Republic) Tereza Ruslerová	Kappa	EXCLUSIA
Prague Raptors	(Czech Republic) Lucie Martínková	(Czech Republic) Tereza Vytlačilová	—	—
