= 2024–25 Czech Women's First League =

Czech football season

Czech Women's First League
- Season: 2024–25
- Champions: Slavia Prague
- Promoted: Baník Ostrava
- Relegated: Pardubice
- Champions League: Slavia Prague; Sparta Prague
- Europa Cup: Slovácko
- Matches: 80
- Goals: 378 (4.73 per match)
- Top goalscorer: Kateřina Svitková (23 Goals)
- Biggest home win: Sparta Prague 15–1 FC Prague
- Biggest away win: FC Prague 1–9 Slovácko
- Highest scoring: Sparta Prague 15–1 FC Prague
- Longest winning run: 13; Sparta Prague
- Longest unbeaten run: 15; Sparta Prague
- Longest winless run: 12; Pardubice
- Longest losing run: 7 FC Prague
- Highest attendance: 6,322; Slavia Prague 5–0 Sparta Prague
- Lowest attendance: 30; Viktoria Plzeň 1–2 Slovácko
- All statistics correct as of 24 May 2025.

The 2024–25 Czech Women's First League was the 32nd season of the Czech Republic's top-tier football league for women. Slavia Prague were the defending champions.

== Format ==
The eight teams played each other twice for a total of 14 matches per team. After that the top four teams played a championship round for another six matches per team. The bottom placed four teams played the relegation round. The champions and runners-up qualify for the 2025–26 UEFA Women's Champions League.

== Teams ==
Location of teams in 2024–25 Czech Women's First League

=== Team changes ===
Promoted from 2023–24 Czech Women's Second League	Relegated from 2023–24 Czech Women's First League
FC Prague	Baník Ostrava

=== Stadiums ===
Team	Home town	Home ground
FC Prague	Prague	Areál SK Aritma
Pardubice	Pardubice	Pod Vinicí
Lokomotiva Brno H. H.	Brno	Horní Heršpice
Slavia Prague	Prague	SK Horní Měcholupy
Slovan Liberec	Liberec	Hrádek nad Nisou
Slovácko	Uherské Hradiště	Městský stadion
Sparta Prague	Prague	Stadion SK Prosek
Viktoria Plzeň	Plzeň	Dobřany

== Regular season ==
=== Standings ===
The regular season ended on 29 March 2025.

Pos	Team	Pld	W	D	L	GF	GA	GD	Pts	Qualification or relegation
1	Sparta Prague	14	13	1	0	87	8	+79	40	Qualification for championship group
2	Slavia Prague	14	12	1	1	55	14	+41	37	Qualification for championship group
3	Slovácko	14	9	0	5	42	15	+27	27	Qualification for championship group
4	Slovan Liberec	14	8	1	5	30	25	+5	25	Qualification for championship group
5	Viktoria Plzeň	14	2	4	8	14	41	−27	10	Qualification for relegation group
6	FC Prague	14	2	2	10	16	68	−52	8	Qualification for relegation group
7	Pardubice	14	1	4	9	9	49	−40	7	Qualification for relegation group
8	Lokomotiva Brno H. H.	14	1	3	10	13	46	−33	6	Qualification for relegation group

Source: Soccerway
Rules for classification: 1) Points; 2) Goal difference; 3) Number of goals scored

=== Results ===
Home \ Away	LOK	PAR	PRA	SLA	SLO	SVK	SPA	VIK
Lokomotiva Brno H. H.		0–0	2–4	0–2	0–5	0–4	1–5	3–2
Pardubice	1–1		0–2	0–6	0–1	0–2	0–5	1–1
FC Prague	3–3	1–3		0–4	1–4	1–9	0–6	2–3
Slavia Prague	7–1	5–0	6–1		3–1	2–1	1–1	9–2
Slovan Liberec	3–0	6–3	5–0	1–3		2–1	0–7	0–0
Slovácko	2–1	6–0	8–0	1–2	1–0		2–3	3–0
Sparta Prague	5–0	12–0	15–1	5–1	6–1	3–0		7–1
Viktoria Plzeň	3–1	1–1	0–0	0–4	0–1	1–2	0–7	

Source: Soccerway
Legend: Blue = home team win; Yellow = draw; Red = away team win.

== Final stage ==
=== Championship group ===
Played by the teams placed first to fourth of the regular season. Teams play each other twice.

Pos	Team	Pld	W	D	L	GF	GA	GD	Pts	Qualification or relegation	SLA	SPA	SVK	SLO
1	Slavia Prague (C)	6	6	0	0	24	2	+22	55	Qualification to Champions League second qualifying round		5–0	3–0	7–0
2	Sparta Prague	6	4	0	2	22	14	+8	52	Qualification to Champions League second qualifying round	0–3		4–2	8–2
3	Slovácko	6	1	0	5	6	17	−11	30	Qualification for Europa Cup second qualifying round	0–3	0–2		1–4
4	Slovan Liberec	6	1	0	5	11	30	−19	28		2–3	2–8	1–3	

Source: Soccerway
Legend: Blue = home team win; Yellow = draw; Red = away team win.
Rules for classification: 1) Points; 2) Goal difference; 3) Number of goals scored
(C) Champions

=== Relegation group ===
Played by the teams placed fifth to eighth of the regular season. Teams play each other twice.

Pos	Team	Pld	W	D	L	GF	GA	GD	Pts	Qualification or relegation	VIK	LOK	PRA	PAR
1	Viktoria Plzeň	6	4	0	2	18	7	+11	22			6–0	2–3	5–2
2	Lokomotiva Brno H. H.	6	5	0	1	16	10	+6	21		1–0		4–3	2–0
3	FC Prague	6	2	0	4	9	16	−7	14		0–2	1–5		0–2
4	Pardubice (R)	6	1	0	5	6	16	−10	10	Relegation to 2025–26 II.league	1–3	0–4	1–2	

Source: Soccerway
Legend: Blue = home team win; Yellow = draw; Red = away team win.
Rules for classification: 1) Points; 2) Goal difference; 3) Number of goals scored
(R) Relegated

== Managerial changes ==
Ahead of the season:

Team	Outgoing manager	Manner of departure	Date of vacancy	Replaced by	Date of appointment	Contract valid until
Slavia Prague	(Czech Republic) Karel Piták	End of contract	Undisclosed	(Czech Republic) Jiří Vágner	17 June 2024	Undisclosed
Slovácko	(Czech Republic) Miroslav Zbořil	Undisclosed	Undisclosed	(Czech Republic) Michaela Daněčková	30 May 2024	Undisclosed
Slovan Liberec	(Czech Republic) Petr Myslivec	Undisclosed	Undisclosed	(Czech Republic) Jiří Kaiser	Undisclosed	Undisclosed
Viktoria Plzeň	(Czech Republic) Pavel Hudeček	Undisclosed	Undisclosed	(Czech Republic) Pavel Vacek	15 July 2024	Undisclosed
Lokomotiva Brno H. H.	Undisclosed	Undisclosed	Undisclosed	(Czech Republic) Zdeněk Matoušek	Undisclosed	Undisclosed

== Personnel and kits ==
Note: Flags indicate national team as has been defined under FIFA eligibility rules. Players may hold more than one non-FIFA nationality.

Team	Manager	Captain	Kit manufacturer	Shirt sponsor
Slovan Liberec	(Czech Republic) Jiří Kaiser	(Slovakia) Valentína Šušolová	Nike	PREGIS
Pardubice	(Czech Republic) Kamil Kozák	(Czech Republic) Denisa Kupková	Joma	—
Slavia Prague	(Czech Republic) Jiří Vágner	(Slovakia) Diana Bartovičová	Puma	eToro
Slovácko	(Czech Republic) Michaela Daněčková	(Czech Republic) Nela Krejčířová	Puma	Tipsport
Sparta Prague	(Slovakia) Pavol Gregora	(Czech Republic) Eva Bartoňová	Adidas	Betano
Viktoria Plzeň	(Czech Republic) Pavel Vacek	(Czech Republic) Miroslava Mrázová	Macron	—
Lokomotiva Brno Horní Heršpice	(Czech Republic) Zdeněk Matoušek	(Czech Republic) Lucie Lišková	Adidas	EXCLUSIA
FC Prague	(Czech Republic) Jan Trousil	(Czech Republic) Klára Zemjánková	Nike	—

== Top scorers ==
As of 24 May 2025

Rank	Player	Club	Goals
1	(Czech Republic) Kateřina Svitková	Slavia Prague	23
2	(Czech Republic) Aneta Polášková	Sparta Prague	14
3	(Czech Republic) Michaela Khýrová	Sparta Prague	13
4	(Slovakia) Darina Hruziková	Slovácko	12
5	(Czech Republic) Kateřina Vojtková	Slovácko	11
6	(Czech Republic) Adéla Trachtová	Sparta Prague	10
6	(Czech Republic) Klára Cvrčková	Slavia Prague	10
7	(Slovakia) Martina Šurnovská	Slavia Prague	9
7	(Czech Republic) Franny Černá	Sparta Prague	9
7	(Czech Republic) Miroslava Mrázová	Viktoria Plzeň	9
7	(Czech Republic) Jana Žufánková	FC Prague	9
8	(Czech Republic) Eliška Sonntagová	Sparta Prague	8
8	(Czech Republic) Lucie Lišková	Lokomotiva Brno H. H.	8
8	(Czech Republic) Andrea Holá	Lokomotiva Brno H. H.	8
