= 2018–19 Czech Women's First League =

Czech Women's First League
- Season: 2018–19
- Champions: Sparta Prague
- Promoted: Pardubice
- Relegated: Hradec Králové
- Champions League: Sparta Prague; Slavia Prague
- Matches: 80
- Goals: 423 (5.29 per match)
- Top goalscorer: Andrea Stašková (32)
- Biggest home win: Sparta Prague 12–0 Slovácko
- Biggest away win: Plzeň 0–17 Slavia Prague
- Highest scoring: Plzeň 0–17 Slavia Prague
- Longest winning run: 16 matches Sparta Prague
- Longest unbeaten run: 20 matches Sparta Prague
- Longest winless run: 9 matches Hradec Králové
- Longest losing run: 6 matches Hradec Králové
- Highest attendance: 723; Slovácko 2–1 Lokomotiva Brno
- Lowest attendance: 20; Liberec 2–0 Plzeň; Hradec Králové 2–1 Lokomotiva Brno; Dukla Prague 1–2 Hradec Králové
- All statistics correct as of 11 June 2019.

The 2018–19 Czech Women's First League was the 26th season of the Czech Republic's top-tier football league for women. Sparta Prague were the defending champions.

== Format ==
The eight teams will play each other twice for a total of 14 matches per team. After that the top four teams will play a championship round for another six matches per team. The bottom placed four teams play the relegation round. The champion and runners-up qualify for the 2019–20 UEFA Women's Champions League.

== Teams ==
Team	Home town	Home ground
Hradec Králové	Hradec Králové	Nový Hradec Králové
Dukla Prague	Prague	SK Prosek
Lokomotiva Brno H. H.	Brno	Horní Heršpice
Slavia Prague	Prague	Stadion SC Xaverov
Slovan Liberec	Liberec	Frýdlant v Čechách
Slovácko	Uherské Hradiště	Sportovní areál Širůch
Sparta Prague	Prague	Strahov Stadium
Viktoria Plzeň	Plzeň	SK Smíchov Plzeň

=== Stadia and locations ===
Location of teams in 2018–19 Czech Women's First League

== Regular season ==
=== Standings ===
The regular season ended on 19 April 2019.

Pos	Team	Pld	W	D	L	GF	GA	GD	Pts	Qualification or relegation
1	Sparta Prague	14	14	0	0	93	4	+89	42	Qualification for championship group
2	Slavia Prague	14	12	0	2	101	7	+94	36	Qualification for championship group
3	Slovan Liberec	14	6	2	6	19	28	−9	20	Qualification for championship group
4	Slovácko	14	5	1	8	20	46	−26	16	Qualification for championship group
5	Viktoria Plzeň	14	4	2	8	25	57	−32	14	Qualification for relegation group
6	Dukla Prague	14	4	2	8	17	48	−31	14	Qualification for relegation group
7	Lokomotiva Brno H. H.	14	3	3	8	17	42	−25	12	Qualification for relegation group
8	Hradec Králové	14	3	0	11	15	75	−60	9	Qualification for relegation group

Source: Soccerway
Rules for classification: 1) Points; 2) Goal difference; 3) Number of goals scored

=== Results ===
Home \ Away	LOK	DUK	HRA	SLA	SLO	SVK	SPA	VIK
Lokomotiva Brno H. H.		0–2	5–1	1–7	0–0	1–0	0–9	2–2
Dukla Prague	0–1		1–2	0–5	0–1	2–2	2–6	2–2
Hradec Králové	2–1	1–3		0–16	1–3	2–5	0–12	1–5
Slavia Prague	2–0	11–0	11–0		5–0	8–0	2–3	6–1
Slovan Liberec	2–2	2–3	1–0	0–1		2–0	0–3	2–0
Slovácko	2–1	1–2	4–1	0–10	4–2		0–7	2–0
Sparta Prague	8–0	10–0	5–0	2–0	7–0	7–0		10–0
Viktoria Plzeň	5–3	4–0	3–4	0–17	2–4	1–0	0–4	

Source: Soccerway
Legend: Blue = home team win; Yellow = draw; Red = away team win.

== Final stage ==
=== Championship group ===
Played by the teams placed first to fourth of the regular season. Teams play each other twice.

Pos	Team	Pld	W	D	L	GF	GA	GD	Pts	Qualification or relegation	SPA	SLA	SLO	SVK
1	Sparta Prague (C)	6	5	1	0	28	7	+21	58	Qualification to Champions League		4–2	2–1	12–0
2	Slavia Prague	6	4	0	2	30	11	+19	48	Qualification to Champions League	3–5		7–0	8–2
3	Liberec	6	0	3	3	2	18	−16	23		0–0	0–8		1–1
4	Slovácko	6	0	2	4	4	33	−29	18		1–5	0–7	0–0	

Source: Soccerway and Soccerway
Legend: Blue = home team win; Yellow = draw; Red = away team win.
Rules for classification: 1) Points; 2) Goal difference; 3) Number of goals scored
(C) Champions

=== Relegation group ===
Played by the teams placed fifth to eighth of the regular season. Teams play each other twice.

Pos	Team	Pld	W	D	L	GF	GA	GD	Pts	Qualification or relegation	VIK	LOK	DUK	HRA
1	Viktoria Plzeň	6	5	0	1	17	7	+10	29			1–3	5–2	3–1
2	Lokomotiva Brno H. H.	6	3	2	1	13	8	+5	23		0–5		5–0	3–0
3	Dukla Prague	6	2	1	3	16	13	+3	21		1–2	1–1		4–0
4	Hradec Králové (R)	6	0	1	5	2	20	−18	10	Relegation to 2019–20 II.league	0–1	1–1	0–8	

Source: Soccerway and Soccerway
Legend: Blue = home team win; Yellow = draw; Red = away team win.
Rules for classification: 1) Points; 2) Goal difference; 3) Number of goals scored
(R) Relegated

== Personnel and kits ==
Note: Flags indicate national team as defined under FIFA eligibility rules. Players may hold more than one non-FIFA nationality.

Team	Manager	Captain	Kit manufacturer	Shirt sponsor
Slovan Liberec	(Czech Republic) Josef Lexa	(Czech Republic) Veronika Tůmová	Nike	Preciosa
Dukla Prague	(Czech Republic) Michal Kolomazník	(Slovakia) Kristína Košíková	Adidas	Carbounion Bohemia
Slavia Prague	(Czech Republic) Pavel Medynský	(Czech Republic) Blanka Pěničková	Puma	CITIC Group
Slovácko	(Czech Republic) Miroslav Zbořil	(Czech Republic) Irena Sedlačíková	Nike	Z-Group
Sparta Prague	(Slovakia) Peter Bartalský	(Czech Republic) Adéla Odehnalová	Nike	—
Viktoria Plzeň	(Czech Republic) Lukáš Růžička	(Czech Republic) Adéla Ondrášková	Alea	Doosan Group
Lokomotiva Brno Horní Heršpice	(Czech Republic) Vladimír Beker	(Czech Republic) Žaneta Holcmannová	Adidas	—
Hradec Králové	(Czech Republic) Petr Rejman	(Czech Republic) Pavla Novotná	Nike	—

== Top goalscorers ==
Final standing

Rank	Scorer	Club	Goals
1	(Czech Republic) Andrea Stašková	Sparta Prague	32
2	(Czech Republic) Kateřina Svitková	Slavia Prague	24
2	(Mexico) Christina Burkenroad	Sparta Prague	24
3	(Czech Republic) Tereza Kožárová	Slavia Prague	21
4	(Czech Republic) Michaela Dubcová	Slavia Prague	19
5	(Czech Republic) Petra Divišová	Slavia Prague	15
6	(United States) Kylie Strom	Sparta Prague	14
