= Tereza Kožárová =

Czech footballer

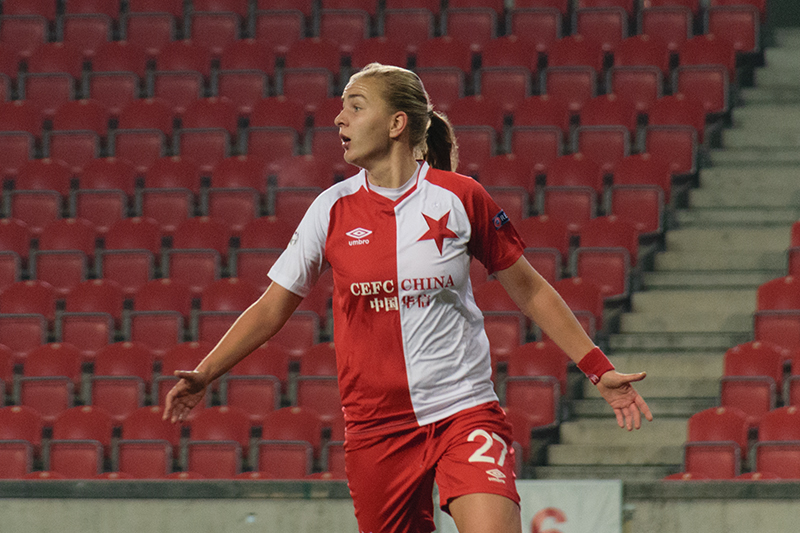

Personal information
- Full name: Tereza Kožárová
- Date of birth: 18 October 1991 (age 35)
- Place of birth: Děčín, Czech Republic
- Height: 1.77 m (5 ft 10 in)
- Position: Striker

Youth career
- 1997–2004: SK Březiny
- 2004–2006: Teplice

Senior career*
Years	Team	Apps	(Gls)
2006–2012	Sparta Prague		
2012–2023	Slavia Prague	?	(103)
2019	→ Slovan Liberec (loan)		
2023–2024	Sparta Prague	16	(18)

International career^{‡}
2010–2018	Czech Republic	39	(9)
- * Club domestic league appearances and goals as of 21:08, 16 July 2024 (UTC) ‡ National team caps and goals as of 21:08, 16 July 2024 (UTC)

Tereza Kožárová (born 18 October 1991) is a Czech former football striker, who played for both Sparta Prague and Slavia Prague. She was a member of the Czech national team from 2010 to 2018.

Goals for the Czech WNT in official competitions
Competition	Stage	Date	Location	Opponent	Goals	Result	Overall
2015 FIFA World Cup	Qualifiers	2014–04–26	Opava	Estonia	1	6–0	1
2019 FIFA World Cup	Qualifiers	2017–09–14	Tórshavn	Faroe Islands	3	8–0	TBD
2019 FIFA World Cup	Qualifiers	2017–10–20	Domžale	Slovenia	1	4–0	TBD

== Honours ==
Titles

- Czech Women's First League (11): 2007–08, 2009–10, 2010–11, 2011–12, 2012–13, 2014–15, 2015–16, 2016–17, 2019–20, 2021–22, 2022–23
- Czech Women's Cup (9): 2007–08, 2008–09, 2009–10, 2010–11, 2011–12, 2012–13, 2015–16, 2021–22, 2022–23
