= 2019–20 Czech Women's First League =

Czech Women's First League
- Season: 2019–20
- Champions: Slavia Prague
- Promoted: none
- Relegated: none
- Champions League: Slavia Prague, Sparta Prague
- Matches: 52
- Goals: 249 (4.79 per match)
- Top goalscorer: Kateřina Svitková (23)
- Biggest home win: Slavia Prague 13–0 Dukla Prague
- Biggest away win: Dukla Prague 0–11 Sparta Prague
- Highest scoring: Slavia Prague 13–1 Pardubice
- Longest winning run: 13 matches Slavia Prague
- Longest unbeaten run: 13 matches Slavia Prague
- Longest winless run: 7 matches Liberec
- Longest losing run: 4 matches Pardubice, Liberec
- Highest attendance: 350; Slavia Prague 3–2 Sparta Prague
- Lowest attendance: 30; Plzeň 6–1 Dukla Prague
- All statistics correct as of 22 March 2020.

The 2019–20 Czech Women's First League was the 27th season of the Czech Republic's top-tier football league for women. Sparta Prague were the defending champions.

On 7 April 2020, the Football Association of the Czech Republic's board of directors agreed to cancel the season early during the COVID-19 pandemic.

== Format ==
The eight teams will play each other twice for a total of 14 matches per team. After that the top four teams will play a championship round for another six matches per team. The bottom placed four teams play the relegation round. The champion and runners-up qualify for the 2020–21 UEFA Women's Champions League.

== Teams ==
Team	Home town	Home ground
Pardubice	Pardubice	Letní Stadion
Dukla Prague	Prague	SK Prosek
Lokomotiva Brno H. H.	Brno	Horní Heršpice
Slavia Prague	Prague	Stadion SC Xaverov
Slovan Liberec	Liberec	Frýdlant v Čechách
Slovácko	Uherské Hradiště	Městský stadion
Sparta Prague	Prague	Strahov Stadium
Viktoria Plzeň	Plzeň	SK Smíchov Plzeň

=== Stadia and locations ===
Location of teams in 2019–20 Czech Women's First League

== Regular season ==
=== Standings ===
The regular season ended on 7 April 2020.

Pos	Team	Pld	W	D	L	GF	GA	GD	Pts	Qualification or relegation
1	Slavia Prague (C)	13	13	0	0	86	7	+79	39	Qualification to Champions League
2	Sparta Prague	13	11	0	2	71	9	+62	33	Qualification to Champions League
3	Viktoria Plzeň	13	8	0	5	29	28	+1	24	
4	Slovácko	13	4	3	6	15	26	−11	15	
5	Lokomotiva Brno H. H.	13	3	2	8	16	36	−20	11	
6	Dukla Prague	13	3	2	8	13	57	−44	11	
7	Slovan Liberec	13	2	3	8	7	30	−23	9	
8	Pardubice	13	3	0	10	12	56	−44	9	

Source: Soccerway
Rules for classification: 1) Points; 2) Goal difference; 3) Number of goals scored
(C) Champions

=== Results ===
Home \ Away	LOK	DUK	PAR	SLA	SLO	SVK	SPA	VIK
Lokomotiva Brno H. H.		1–3	0–1	1–3	3–3	1–1	0–5	1–2
Dukla Prague	1–4		3–2	–	0–1	1–1	0–11	0–1
Pardubice	0–1	2–3		1–7	1–0	–	1–8	1–2
Slavia Prague	7–0	13–0	13–1		5–0	4–0	3–2	8–0
Slovan Liberec	–	1–1	1–2	0–6		0–0	0–5	0–1
Slovácko	1–2	3–0	3–0	1–7	0–1		1–4	2–1
Sparta Prague	3–1	11–0	7–0	1–2	4–0	5–1		–
Viktoria Plzeň	6–1	6–1	8–0	0–8	2–0	0–1	0–5	

Source: Soccerway
Legend: Blue = home team win; Yellow = draw; Red = away team win.

== Final stage ==
On 7 April 2020, the league announced that the play-offs would be cancelled due to the COVID-19 pandemic, with the regular season standings being used to determine the champions of the league.

== Personnel and kits ==
Note: Flags indicate national team as has been defined under FIFA eligibility rules. Players may hold more than one non-FIFA nationality.

Team	Manager	Captain	Kit manufacturer	Shirt sponsor
Slovan Liberec	(Czech Republic) Josef Lexa	(Slovakia) Valentína Šušolová	Nike	Preciosa
Dukla Prague	(Italy) Antonio Console	(Czech Republic) Michaela Beránková	Adidas	ProInterier
Slavia Prague	(Czech Republic) Michal Kolomazník	(Slovakia) Diana Bartovičová	Puma	CITIC Group
Slovácko	(Czech Republic) Petr Bláha	(Czech Republic) Eliška Janíková	Puma	Z-Group
Sparta Prague	(Slovakia) Peter Bartalský	(Czech Republic) Petra Bertholdová	Nike	—
Viktoria Plzeň	(Czech Republic) Eduard Kubata	(Czech Republic) Petra Markelová	Alea	Doosan Group
Lokomotiva Brno Horní Heršpice	(Czech Republic) Jaromír Piták	(Czech Republic) Tereza Krištofová	Adidas	—
Pardubice	(Czech Republic) Ondřej Bačo	(Czech Republic) Denisa Kupková	Lotto	Strabag

== Top goalscorers ==
Final standing

Rank	Scorer	Club	Goals
1	(Czech Republic) Kateřina Svitková	Slavia Prague	23
2	(Czech Republic) Tereza Kožárová	Slavia Prague	18
2	(Czech Republic) Lucie Martínková	Sparta Prague	18
3	(Mexico) Christina Burkenroad	Sparta Prague	11
3	(Czech Republic) Gabriela Šlajsová	Viktoria Plzeň	11
4	(Czech Republic) Petra Divišová	Slavia Prague	7
4	(Czech Republic) Miroslava Mrázová	Viktoria Plzeň	7
