= 2014–15 Czech Women's First League =

Czech Women's First League
- Season: 2014–15
- Champions: Slavia Praha
- Promoted: Dukla Prague
- Relegated: Hradec Králové
- Champions League: Slavia Praha
- Top goalscorer: Lucie Martínková (23)
- Biggest home win: Sparta 13–0 Liberec; Slavia 13–0 Liberec
- Biggest away win: Pardubice 0–11 Slavia; Bohemians 0–11 Sparta
- Highest scoring: Sparta 13–0 Liberec; Slavia 13–0 Liberec

The 2014–15 Czech Women's First League is the 22nd season of the Czech Republic's top-tier football league for women. Slavia Praha were the defending champions.

The championship was won by Slavia for the fourth time, and the second time since 2004.

== Format ==
The eight teams will play each other twice for a total of 14 matches per team. After that the top four teams will play a championship round for another six matches per team. The bottom placed four teams play the relegation round. Points accumulated after the regular season are halved and added the points from the next round. The champion qualify for the UEFA Women's Champions League.

== Regular season ==
=== Standings ===
The regular season ended on 19 April 2015.

Pos	Team	Pld	W	D	L	GF	GA	GD	Pts	Qualification or relegation
1	Slavia Praha	14	13	0	1	102	7	+95	39	Qualification for championship group
2	Sparta Praha	14	13	0	1	77	8	+69	39	Qualification for championship group
3	Slovácko	14	9	1	4	39	26	+13	28	Qualification for championship group
4	Bohemians Praha	14	4	5	5	16	31	−15	17	Qualification for championship group
5	Slovan Liberec	14	5	1	8	23	61	−38	16	Qualification for relegation group
6	Viktoria Plzeň	14	3	2	9	14	45	−31	11	Qualification for relegation group
7	Pardubice	14	2	1	11	9	63	−54	7	Qualification for relegation group
8	Hradec Králové	14	1	2	11	9	48	−39	5	Qualification for relegation group

=== Results ===
Home \ Away	BOH	HRK	LIB	PAR	SLA	SLO	SPA	VPL
Bohemians		2–0	3–0	3–2	0–7	1–1	0–4	1–1
Hradec Králové	0–0		1–2	1–1	0–8	1–2	0–6	1–0
Slovan Liberec	1–1	5–3		7–0	1–5	0–6	0–6	3–2
Pardubice	1–2	2–1	1–3		0–11	0–1	0–4	2–1
Slavia Praha	6–0	10–0	13–0	9–0		6–1	3–4	8–0
Slovácko	2–0	4–1	5–1	7–0	1–5		0–8	1–0
Sparta Praha	4–1	5–0	13–0	9–0	0–3	2–1		7–0
Viktoria Plzeň	2–2	1–0	2–0	4–0	0–8	1–7	0–5	

Legend: Blue = home team win; Yellow = draw; Red = away team win.

== Final stage ==
Points of the regular season were halved and rounded up, goal difference was kept.

=== Championship group ===
Played by the teams placed first to fourth of the regular season. Teams play each other twice.

Pos	Team	Pld	W	D	L	GF	GA	GD	Pts	Qualification or relegation	SLA	SPA	SLO	BOH
1	Slavia Praha (C)	6	5	1	0	130	14	+116	36	Qualification to Champions League		5–4	6–2	5–0
2	Sparta Praha	6	3	2	1	107	14	+93	31		1–1		0–0	9–0
3	Slovácko	6	2	1	3	45	39	+6	21		0–2	0–5		2–0
4	Bohemians	6	0	0	6	16	69	−53	9		0–9	0–11	0–2	

Source: fotbal.cz
Legend: Blue = home team win; Yellow = draw; Red = away team win.
(C) Champions

=== Relegation group ===
Played by the teams placed fifth to eighth of the regular season. Teams play each other twice.

Pos	Team	Pld	W	D	L	GF	GA	GD	Pts	Qualification or relegation	LIB	PLZ	PAR	HRK
5	Slovan Liberec	6	3	1	2	31	71	−40	26			4–3	0–0	2–1
6	Viktoria Plzeň	6	3	1	2	29	52	−23	21		1–2		2–0	4–1
7	Pardubice	6	2	1	3	13	69	−56	14		2–0	0–2		2–1
8	Hradec Králové (R)	6	2	0	4	16	57	−41	11	Relegation to 2015–16 II.liga	3–0	0–3	1–0	

Source: nv.fotbal.cz
Legend: Blue = home team win; Yellow = draw; Red = away team win.
(R) Relegated

== Relegation play-off ==
Dukla Praha had won the second league promotion play-off against Zbrojovka Brno 1–1 (a) and promoted to the first division.

30 May 2015
15:30

Zbrojovka Brno	1 – 1	Dukla Praha
Veselá K. 20'	Report	Kozlíková 43'

Rosice u Brna
13 June 2015
10:30

Dukla Praha	0 – 0	Zbrojovka Brno
	Report

UMT Juliska, Praha

== Personnel and kits ==
Note: Flags indicate national team as has been defined under FIFA eligibility rules. Players may hold more than one non-FIFA nationality.

Team	Manager	Captain	Kit manufacturer	Shirt sponsor
Slovan Liberec	(Czech Republic) Jiří Dvořák	(Czech Republic) Iva Pižlová	Nike	Preciosa
Hradec Králové	(Czech Republic) Petr Kincl	(Czech Republic) Veronika Vlasatíková	Adidas	—
Slavia Praha	(Czech Republic) Anton Mišovec	(Czech Republic) Blanka Pěničková	Umbro	—
Slovácko	(Czech Republic) Petr Vlachovský	(Czech Republic) Radka Bednaříková	Kappa	Z-Group
Sparta Praha	(Czech Republic) Martin Šeran	(Czech Republic) Petra Bertholdová	Nike	Blesk Energie
Viktoria Plzeň	(Czech Republic) Karel Rada	(Czech Republic) Hana Hanžlová	Alea	—
Bohemians Praha	(Czech Republic) Pavel Mráz	(Czech Republic) Tereza Koubová	Uhlsport	GHC Genetics
Pardubice	(Czech Republic) Petr Šmeral	(Czech Republic) Kateřina Urbancová	Jako	—

== Top goalscorers ==
Final standing

Rank	Scorer	Club	Goals
1	(Czech Republic) Lucie Martínková	Sparta Praha	23
2	(Czech Republic) Kateřina Svitková	Slavia Praha	22
2	(Czech Republic) Simona Necidová	Slavia Praha	22
3	(Czech Republic) Petra Divišová	Slavia Praha	17
3	(Czech Republic) Tereza Kožárová	Slavia Praha	17
4	(Czech Republic) Eva Bartoňová	Sparta Praha	12
4	(Czech Republic) Kristýna Janků	Slovácko	12
4	(Czech Republic) Blanka Pěničková	Slavia Praha	12
4	(Czech Republic) Andrea Jarchovská	Slovan Liberec	12
5	(Czech Republic) Iva Mocová	Sparta Praha	10
