= 2020–21 Czech Women's First League =

Czech Women's First League
- Season: 2020–21
- Champions: Sparta Prague
- Promoted: none
- Relegated: none
- Champions League: Sparta Prague; Slavia Prague; Slovácko
- Matches: 80
- Goals: 346 (4.33 per match)
- Top goalscorer: Lucie Martínková (37)
- Biggest home win: Sparta Prague 10–0 Dukla Prague, Sparta Prague 10–0 Lokomotiva Brno
- Biggest away win: Plzeň 0–8 Slavia Prague, Plzeň 1–9 Slavia Prague
- Highest scoring: Dukla Prague 5–5 Pardubice, Sparta Prague 10–0 Dukla Prague, Slavia Prague 9–1 Pardubice, Sparta Prague 10–0 Lokomotiva Brno, Plzeň 1–9 Slavia Prague
- Longest winning run: 13 matches Slavia Prague
- Longest unbeaten run: 17 matches Slavia Prague
- Longest winless run: 13 matches Pardubice
- Longest losing run: 6 matches Pardubice
- Highest attendance: 451; Sparta Prague 5–1 Slavia Prague
- Lowest attendance: 20; Dukla Prague 3–3 Liberec
- All statistics correct as of 19 June 2021.

The 2020–21 Czech Women's First League was the 28th season of the Czech Republic's top-tier football league for women. Slavia Prague were the defending champions.

== Format ==
The eight teams played each other twice for a total of 14 matches per team. After that the top four teams played a championship round for another six matches per team. The bottom placed four teams played the relegation round. The champions, runners-up and third-placed teams qualified for the 2021–22 UEFA Women's Champions League.

== Teams ==
| Team | Home town | Home ground |
|---|---|---|
| Pardubice | Pardubice | Pod Vinicí |
| Dukla Prague | Prague | Stadion Juliska |
| Lokomotiva Brno H. H. | Brno | Hrušovany u Brna |
| Slavia Prague | Prague | SK Horní Měcholupy |
| Slovan Liberec | Liberec | Městský stadion |
| Slovácko | Uherské Hradiště | Městský stadion |
| Sparta Prague | Prague | Strahov Stadium |
| Viktoria Plzeň | Plzeň | Dobřany |

=== Stadia and locations ===
Location of teams in 2020–21 Czech Women's First League

== Regular season ==
=== Standings ===
The regular season ended on 2 May 2021.

| Pos | Team | Pld | W | D | L | GF | GA | GD | Pts | Qualification or relegation |
|---|---|---|---|---|---|---|---|---|---|---|
| 1 | Sparta Prague | 14 | 13 | 0 | 1 | 75 | 7 | +68 | 39 | Qualification for championship group |
| 2 | Slavia Prague | 14 | 13 | 0 | 1 | 77 | 9 | +68 | 39 | Qualification for championship group |
| 3 | Slovácko | 14 | 9 | 1 | 4 | 27 | 18 | +9 | 28 | Qualification for championship group |
| 4 | Viktoria Plzeň | 14 | 5 | 0 | 9 | 17 | 37 | −20 | 15 | Qualification for championship group |
| 5 | Dukla Prague | 14 | 4 | 2 | 8 | 17 | 50 | −33 | 14 | Qualification for relegation group |
| 6 | Lokomotiva Brno H. H. | 14 | 4 | 1 | 9 | 15 | 41 | −26 | 13 | Qualification for relegation group |
| 7 | Slovan Liberec | 14 | 4 | 0 | 10 | 12 | 41 | −29 | 12 | Qualification for relegation group |
| 8 | Pardubice | 14 | 1 | 2 | 11 | 19 | 56 | −37 | 5 | Qualification for relegation group |

Source: Soccerway
Rules for classification: 1) Points; 2) Goal difference; 3) Number of goals scored

=== Results ===
| Home \ Away | LOK | DUK | PAR | SLA | SLO | SVK | SPA | VIK |
|---|---|---|---|---|---|---|---|---|
| Lokomotiva Brno H. H. | | 4–0 | 2–1 | 1–5 | 3–2 | 0–1 | 0–2 | 0–3 |
| Dukla Prague | 3–2 | | 5–5 | 0–6 | 1–2 | 1–1 | 1–7 | 1–4 |
| Pardubice | 1–1 | 0–2 | | 1–8 | 1–2 | 0–1 | 1–8 | 3–1 |
| Slavia Prague | 6–0 | 7–0 | 9–1 | | 8–0 | 2–0 | 2–0 | 3–0 |
| Slovan Liberec | 1–2 | 0–1 | 2–1 | 0–7 | | 1–5 | 0–5 | 0–1 |
| Slovácko | 4–0 | 2–0 | 4–1 | 1–5 | 1–0 | | 1–3 | 1–0 |
| Sparta Prague | 10–0 | 10–0 | 7–1 | 5–1 | 5–0 | 3–0 | | 8–0 |
| Viktoria Plzeň | 2–0 | 0–2 | 4–2 | 0–8 | 0–2 | 2–5 | 0–2 | |

Source: Soccerway
Legend: Blue = home team win; Yellow = draw; Red = away team win.

== Final stage ==
=== Championship group ===
Played by the teams placed first to fourth of the regular season. Teams play each other twice.

| Pos | Team | Pld | W | D | L | GF | GA | GD | Pts | Qualification or relegation | SPA | SLA | SVK | VIK |
|---|---|---|---|---|---|---|---|---|---|---|---|---|---|---|
| 1 | Sparta Prague (C) | 6 | 4 | 2 | 0 | 21 | 4 | +17 | 53 | Qualification to Champions League second round | | 1–1 | 5–1 | 5–0 |
| 2 | Slavia Prague | 6 | 4 | 2 | 0 | 23 | 4 | +19 | 53 | Qualification to Champions League second round | 1–1 | | 2–0 | 4–1 |
| 3 | Slovácko | 6 | 1 | 0 | 5 | 3 | 16 | −13 | 31 | Qualification to Champions League first round | 0–1 | 0–6 | | 0–1 |
| 4 | Viktoria Plzeň | 6 | 1 | 0 | 5 | 5 | 28 | −23 | 18 | | 1–8 | 1–9 | 1–2 | |

Source: Soccerway
Legend: Blue = home team win; Yellow = draw; Red = away team win.
Rules for classification: 1) Points; 2) Goal difference; 3) Number of goals scored
(C) Champions

=== Relegation group ===
Played by the teams placed fifth to eighth of the regular season. Teams play each other twice.

| Pos | Team | Pld | W | D | L | GF | GA | GD | Pts | SLO | LOK | DUK | PAR |
|---|---|---|---|---|---|---|---|---|---|---|---|---|---|
| 1 | Liberec | 6 | 3 | 2 | 1 | 10 | 5 | +5 | 23 | | 1–0 | 3–0 | 0–1 |
| 2 | Lokomotiva Brno H. H. | 6 | 2 | 1 | 3 | 7 | 9 | −2 | 20 | 0–2 | | 4–2 | 1–3 |
| 3 | Dukla Prague | 6 | 1 | 2 | 3 | 8 | 16 | −8 | 19 | 3–3 | 1–1 | | 2–1 |
| 4 | Pardubice | 6 | 3 | 1 | 2 | 10 | 5 | +5 | 15 | 1–1 | 0–1 | 4–0 | |

Source: Soccerway
Legend: Blue = home team win; Yellow = draw; Red = away team win.
Rules for classification: 1) Points; 2) Goal difference; 3) Number of goals scored

== Personnel and kits ==
Note: Flags indicate national team as has been defined under FIFA eligibility rules. Players may hold more than one non-FIFA nationality.

| Team | Manager | Captain | Kit manufacturer | Shirt sponsor |
|---|---|---|---|---|
| Slovan Liberec | (Czech Republic) Josef Lexa | (Slovakia) Valentína Šušolová | Nike | Preciosa |
| Dukla Prague | (Slovakia) Daniel Sakar | (Czech Republic) Michaela Beránková | Adidas | ProInterier |
| Slavia Praha | (Czech Republic) Michal Kolomazník | (Slovakia) Diana Bartovičová | Puma | CITIC Group |
| Slovácko | (Czech Republic) Petr Bláha | (Czech Republic) Eliška Janíková | Puma | Z-Group |
| Sparta Prague | (Slovakia) Martin Masaryk | (Czech Republic) Petra Bertholdová | Nike | — |
| Viktoria Plzeň | (Czech Republic) Daniel Prokop | (Czech Republic) Petra Markelová | Macron | — |
| Lokomotiva Brno Horní Heršpice | (Czech Republic) Jaromír Piták | (Czech Republic) Tereza Krištofová | Adidas | Exclusia |
| Pardubice | (Czech Republic) Ondřej Bačo | (Czech Republic) Denisa Kupková | Lotto | Strabag |

== Top goalscorers ==
Final standing

| Rank | Scorer | Club | Goals |
|---|---|---|---|
| 1 | (Czech Republic) Lucie Martínková | Sparta Prague | 37 |
| 2 | (Czech Republic) Tereza Kožárová | Slavia Prague | 34 |
| 3 | (Czech Republic) Aneta Pochmanová | Sparta Prague | 14 |
| 4 | (Czech Republic) Petra Divišová | Slavia Prague | 11 |
| 4 | (Czech Republic) Kristýna Růžičková | Pardubice | 11 |
| 5 | (Czech Republic) Franny Černá | Slavia Prague | 9 |
| 6 | (Czech Republic) Miroslava Mrázová | Viktoria Plzeň | 8 |
| 6 | (Czech Republic) Markéta Ringelová | Sparta Prague | 8 |
| 6 | (Sweden) Mia Persson | Slavia Prague | 8 |
