= Eva Šmeralová =

Czech footballer

Personal information
- Date of birth: 24 August 1976 (age 50)
- Place of birth: Pardubice, Czechoslovakia
- Height: 1.69 m (5 ft 7 in)
- Position: Defender

Youth career
- Hradec Králové
- Compex Otrokovice

Senior career*
Years	Team	Apps	(Gls)
- DFO Pardubice
- Sparta Prague
2009–2010	DFO Pardubice		

International career
1993–2008	Czech Republic	75	(14)
- * Club domestic league appearances and goals

Eva Šmeralová (born 24 August 1976) is a former Czech football defender. She played for, and captained, both Sparta Prague and the Czech national team.

Šmeralová was the most capped Czech international women's player with 75 appearances. She was named Czech female footballer of the year in 2000 and 2003.

Šmeralová started football at the age of 13 with Hradec Králové.

She started her international career in 1993 in a friendly match against Slovakia, scoring on her debut.

Šmeralová scored a hat-trick in the 2008 Czech Women's Cup final against Slavia, as Sparta won 5–1.

In 2009, Šmeralová joined SK DFO Pardubice.
