= 2015–16 Czech Women's First League =

Czech Women's First League
- Season: 2015–16
- Champions: Slavia Prague
- Promoted: Hradec Králové
- Relegated: Pardubice
- Champions League: Slavia Prague, Sparta Prague
- Matches: 80
- Goals: 397 (4.96 per match)
- Top goalscorer: Petra Divišová (27)
- Biggest home win: Slavia Prague 11–0 Pardubice
- Biggest away win: Pardubice 0–11 Slavia Prague; Pardubice 0–11 Slovácko; Bohemians 0–11 Sparta Prague
- Highest scoring: Liberec 2–11 Sparta Prague
- Longest winning run: 14 matches Slavia Prague
- Longest unbeaten run: 16 matches Slavia Prague
- Longest winless run: 10 matches Pardubice
- Longest losing run: 10 matches Pardubice
- Highest attendance: 530; Slavia Prague 1–1 Sparta Prague
- Lowest attendance: 20; Plzeň 4–0 Pardubice
- Average attendance: 50
- All statistics correct as of 14 May 2016.

The 2015–16 Czech Women's First League is the 23rd season of the Czech Republic's top-tier football league for women. Slavia Prague were the defending champions.

== Format ==
The eight teams will play each other twice for a total of 14 matches per team. After that the top four teams will play a championship round for another six matches per team. The bottom placed four teams play the relegation round. Points accumulated after the regular season are halved and added the points from the next round. The champion and runners-up qualify for the 2016–17 UEFA Women's Champions League.

== Teams ==
Location of the 2015–16 Czech Women's First League teams.

Team	Home town	Home ground
Bohemians	Prague	Stadion SK Prosek
Dukla Prague	Prague	Sportovní areál eRZet
Pardubice	Pardubice	Letní stadion
Slavia Prague	Prague	Stadion SC Xaverov
Slovan Liberec	Liberec	Frýdlant v Čechách
Slovácko	Uherské Hradiště	Sportovní areál Širůch
Sparta Prague	Prague	Strahov Stadium
Viktoria Plzeň	Plzeň	SK Smíchov

== Regular season ==
=== Standings ===
The regular season ended on 27 March 2016.

Pos	Team	Pld	W	D	L	GF	GA	GD	Pts	Qualification or relegation
1	Sparta Prague	14	13	0	1	95	10	+85	39	Qualification for championship group
2	Slavia Prague	14	13	0	1	78	8	+70	39	Qualification for championship group
3	Slovácko	14	9	1	4	55	17	+38	28	Qualification for championship group
4	Bohemians	14	7	2	5	28	42	−14	23	Qualification for championship group
5	Dukla Prague	14	4	1	9	17	56	−39	13	Qualification for relegation group
6	Slovan Liberec	14	3	2	9	21	59	−38	11	Qualification for relegation group
7	Viktoria Plzeň	14	3	0	11	17	47	−30	9	Qualification for relegation group
8	Pardubice	14	1	0	13	2	74	−72	3	Qualification for relegation group

Source: Soccerway
Rules for classification: 1) Points; 2) Goal difference; 3) Number of goals scored

=== Results ===
Home \ Away	BOH	DUK	PAR	SLA	SLO	SVK	SPA	VIK
Bohemians		4–1	4–0	0–6	2–1	1–1	0–11	6–0
Dukla Prague	0–3		2–0	2–7	3–3	0–3	0–7	2–0
Pardubice	0–3	0–2		0–11	2–0	0–11	0–6	0–1
Slavia Prague	5–0	5–0	11–0		2–0	5–0	4–0	4–0
Slovan Liberec	2–2	2–4	5–0	1–9		0–7	2–11	1–0
Slovácko	6–0	8–0	6–0	1–2	5–1		0–3	4–2
Sparta Prague	8–1	10–0	8–0	4–0	10–0	2–0		9–1
Viktoria Plzeň	1–2	4–1	4–0	0–6	2–3	1–3	1–6	

Source: Soccerway
Legend: Blue = home team win; Yellow = draw; Red = away team win.

== Final stage ==
Points of the regular season were halved and rounded up, goal difference was kept.

=== Championship group ===
Played by the teams placed first to fourth of the regular season. Teams play each other twice.

Pos	Team	Pld	W	D	L	GF	GA	GD	Pts	Qualification or relegation	SLA	SPA	SVK	BOH
1	Slavia Prague (C)	6	5	1	0	98	12	+86	36	Qualification to Champions League		1–1	3–1	4–0
2	Sparta Prague	6	3	2	1	109	18	+91	31	Qualification to Champions League	2–3		1–0	4–0
3	Slovácko	6	1	2	3	66	30	+36	19		0–2	4–4		3–0
4	Bohemians	6	0	1	5	31	65	−34	13		0–7	0–2	3–3	

Source: Soccerway
Legend: Blue = home team win; Yellow = draw; Red = away team win.
Rules for classification: 1) Points; 2) Goal difference; 3) Number of goals scored
(C) Champions

=== Relegation group ===
Played by the teams placed fifth to eighth of the regular season. Teams play each other twice.

Pos	Team	Pld	W	D	L	GF	GA	GD	Pts	Qualification or relegation	DUK	VIK	SLO	PAR
1	Dukla Prague	6	4	1	1	33	62	−29	20			2–0	0–2	3–0
2	Viktoria Plzeň	6	3	2	1	23	51	−28	16		1–1		3–0	6–1
3	Slovan Liberec	6	1	3	2	30	74	−44	12		3–8	0–0		1–1
4	Pardubice (R)	6	0	2	4	7	91	−84	4	Relegation to 2016–17 II.league	0–2	0–2	3–3	

Source: Soccerway
Legend: Blue = home team win; Yellow = draw; Red = away team win.
Rules for classification: 1) Points; 2) Goal difference; 3) Number of goals scored
(R) Relegated

== Personnel and kits ==
Note: Flags indicate national team as has been defined under FIFA eligibility rules. Players may hold more than one non-FIFA nationality.

Team	Manager	Captain	Kit manufacturer	Shirt sponsor
Slovan Liberec	(Czech Republic) Jiří Dvořák	(Czech Republic) Ivana Pižlová	Nike	Preciosa
Dukla Prague	(Czech Republic) Jan Vetyška	(Czech Republic) Veronika Kozlíková	Adidas	Carbounion Bohemia
Slavia Prague	(Czech Republic) Anton Mišovec	(Czech Republic) Blanka Pěničková	Umbro	CEFC China
Slovácko	(Czech Republic) Petr Vlachovský	(Czech Republic) Radka Bednaříková	Kappa	Z-Group
Sparta Prague	(Czech Republic) Jan Janota	(Czech Republic) Lucie Martínková	Nike	Blesk Energie
Viktoria Plzeň	(Czech Republic) Karel Rada	(Czech Republic) Adéla Ondrášková	Alea	Doosan Group
Bohemians Prague	(Czech Republic) Jaromír Jindráček	(Czech Republic) Tereza Koubová	Uhlsport	Ecolite
Pardubice	(Czech Republic) Petr Rejman	(Czech Republic) Kateřina Urbancová	Givova	Libor Matějka - autodoprava

== Top goalscorers ==
Final standing

Rank	Scorer	Club	Goals
1	(Czech Republic) Petra Divišová	Slavia Prague	27
2	(Czech Republic) Tereza Kožárová	Slavia Prague	24
3	(Czech Republic) Lucie Martínková	Sparta Prague	22
4	(Czech Republic) Irena Martínková	Sparta Prague	16
5	(Czech Republic) Kateřina Svitková	Slavia Prague	14
6	(Slovakia) Klaudia Fabová	Slovácko	13
