= 2016–17 Czech Women's First League =

Czech Women's First League
- Season: 2016–17
- Champions: Slavia Prague
- Promoted: Lokomotiva Brno Horní Heršpice
- Relegated: Zbrojovka Brno
- Champions League: Slavia Prague, Sparta Prague
- Matches: 80
- Goals: 387 (4.84 per match)
- Top goalscorer: Kateřina Svitková (26)
- Biggest home win: Sparta Prague 13–0 Brno
- Biggest away win: Brno 0–12 Slavia Prague
- Highest scoring: Sparta Prague 13–0 Brno
- Longest winning run: 16 matches Slavia Prague
- Longest unbeaten run: 18 matches Slavia Prague
- Longest winless run: 12 matches Brno
- Longest losing run: 12 matches Brno
- Highest attendance: 627; Dukla Prague 0–0 Viktoria Plzeň
- Lowest attendance: 18; Brno 0–7 Slovácko
- Average attendance: 50
- All statistics correct as of 4 June 2017.

The 2016–17 Czech Women's First League is the 24th season of the Czech Republic's top-tier football league for women. Slavia Prague were the defending champions.

== Format ==
The eight teams will play each other twice for a total of 14 matches per team. After that the top four teams will play a championship round for another six matches per team. The bottom placed four teams play the relegation round. Points accumulated after the regular season are halved and added the points from the next round. The champion and runners-up qualify for the 2017–18 UEFA Women's Champions League.

== Teams ==
Team	Home town	Home ground
Hradec Králové	Hradec Králové	Nový Hradec Králové
Dukla Prague	Prague	Sportovní areál eRZet
Brno	Brno	Slovan Rosice
Slavia Prague	Prague	Stadion SC Xaverov
Slovan Liberec	Liberec	Frýdlant v Čechách
Slovácko	Uherské Hradiště	Sportovní areál Širůch
Sparta Prague	Prague	Strahov Stadium
Viktoria Plzeň	Plzeň	SK Smíchov Plzeň

=== Stadia and locations ===
Location of teams in 2016–17 Czech Women's First League

== Regular season ==
=== Standings ===
The regular season ended on 16 April 2017.

Pos	Team	Pld	W	D	L	GF	GA	GD	Pts	Qualification or relegation
1	Slavia Prague	14	12	2	0	84	8	+76	38	Qualification for championship group
2	Sparta Prague	14	11	2	1	72	6	+66	35	Qualification for championship group
3	Slovácko	14	10	1	3	46	17	+29	31	Qualification for championship group
4	Slovan Liberec	14	6	0	8	21	36	−15	18	Qualification for championship group
5	Viktoria Plzeň	14	5	2	7	20	41	−21	17	Qualification for relegation group
6	Dukla Prague	14	5	1	8	19	29	−10	16	Qualification for relegation group
7	Hradec Králové	14	2	0	12	12	62	−50	6	Qualification for relegation group
8	Zbrojovka Brno	14	1	0	13	11	86	−75	3	Qualification for relegation group

Source: Soccerway
Rules for classification: 1) Points; 2) Goal difference; 3) Number of goals scored

=== Results ===
Home \ Away	ZBR	DUK	HRA	SLA	SLO	SVK	SPA	VIK
Brno		2–5	3–6	0–12	0–4	0–7	0–9	1–5
Dukla Prague	2–1		6–0	0–4	0–2	2–5	0–2	1–0
Hradec Králové	1–2	0–2		0–9	3–1	0–4	0–5	0–2
Slavia Prague	8–0	3–1	6–0		9–0	6–1	1–1	10–2
Slovan Liberec	4–1	2–0	5–1	0–5		0–4	0–2	3–2
Slovácko	7–1	1–0	1–0	2–5	4–0		4–0	6–1
Sparta Prague	13–0	7–0	12–0	1–1	4–0	2–0		7–0
Viktoria Plzeň	3–0	0–0	4–1	0–5	1–0	0–0	0–7	

Source: Soccerway
Legend: Blue = home team win; Yellow = draw; Red = away team win.

== Final stage ==
Points of the regular season were halved and rounded up, goal difference was kept.

=== Championship group ===
Played by the teams placed first to fourth of the regular season. Teams play each other twice. Points from the first stage are halved and rounded up.

Pos	Team	Pld	W	D	L	GF	GA	GD	Pts	Qualification or relegation	SLA	SPA	SVK	SLO
1	Slavia Prague (C)	6	6	0	0	113	12	+101	37	Qualification to Champions League		1–0	4–2	8–1
2	Sparta Prague	6	3	1	2	90	12	+78	28	Qualification to Champions League	1–3		3–0	4–0
3	Slovácko	6	2	1	3	57	31	+26	23		0–4	2–2		4–1
4	Liberec	6	0	0	6	23	72	−49	9		0–9	0–8	0–3	

Source: Soccerway
Legend: Blue = home team win; Yellow = draw; Red = away team win.
Rules for classification: 1) Points; 2) Goal difference; 3) Number of goals scored
(C) Champions

=== Relegation group ===
Played by the teams placed fifth to eighth of the regular season. Teams play each other twice.

Pos	Team	Pld	W	D	L	GF	GA	GD	Pts	Qualification or relegation	DUK	VIK	HRA	ZBR
1	Dukla Prague	6	4	1	1	32	32	0	21			0–0	1–3	5–0
2	Viktoria Plzeň	6	3	2	1	32	45	−13	20		0–1		3–0	5–1
3	Hradec Králové	6	2	1	3	25	73	−48	10		0–2	2–2		8–1
4	Zbrojovka Brno (R)	6	1	0	5	15	110	−95	5	Relegation to 2017–18 II.liga	0–4	0–2	2–0	

Source: Soccerway
Legend: Blue = home team win; Yellow = draw; Red = away team win.
Rules for classification: 1) Points; 2) Goal difference; 3) Number of goals scored
(R) Relegated

== Personnel and kits ==
Note: Flags indicate national team as has been defined under FIFA eligibility rules. Players may hold more than one non-FIFA nationality.

Team	Manager	Captain	Kit manufacturer	Shirt sponsor
Slovan Liberec	(Czech Republic) Josef Lexa	(Czech Republic) Markéta Matějková	Nike	Preciosa
Dukla Praha	(Czech Republic) Jan Vetyška	(Czech Republic) Veronika Kozlíková	Adidas	Carbounion Bohemia
Slavia Praha	(Czech Republic) Pavel Medynský	(Czech Republic) Blanka Pěničková	Umbro	CEFC China
Slovácko	(Czech Republic) Petr Vlachovský	(Czech Republic) Radka Bednaříková	Nike	Z-Group
Sparta Praha	(Czech Republic) Jan Janota	(Czech Republic) Adéla Odehnalová	Nike	PCI für Bau-Profis
Viktoria Plzeň	(Czech Republic) Karel Rada	(Czech Republic) Adéla Ondrášková	Alea	Doosan Group
Zbrojovka Brno	(Czech Republic) Michal Odehnal	(Czech Republic) Kristýna Hádlíková	Umbro	OHL ŽS
Hradec Králové	(Czech Republic) Vladimír Táborský	(Czech Republic) Jana Lacinová	Umbro	Město Hradec Králové

== Top goalscorers ==
Final standing

Rank	Scorer	Club	Goals
1	(Czech Republic) Kateřina Svitková	Slavia Praha	26
2	(Czech Republic) Tereza Kožárová	Slavia Praha	23
3	(Czech Republic) Lucie Martínková	Sparta Prague	12
3	(Czech Republic) Petra Bertholdová	Sparta Prague	12
3	(Czech Republic) Iva Mocová	Sparta Prague	12
4	(Slovakia) Klaudia Fabová	Slovácko	11
5	(Czech Republic) Blanka Pěničková	Slavia Prague	10
5	(Slovakia) Ivana Kantarská	Dukla Prague	10
