= Lucia Ondrušová =

Slovak footballer (born 1988)

Personal information
- Full name: Lucia Ondrušová
- Date of birth: 10 May 1988 (age 38)
- Place of birth: Bratislava, Czechoslovakia (now Slovakia)
- Height: 1.71 m (5 ft 7 in)
- Position: Midfielder

Team information
- Current team: TJ Sokol Lysolaje

Youth career
- OŠK Marianka

Senior career*
Years	Team	Apps	(Gls)
2005–2006	PVFA Bratislava		
2006–2007	Slovan Bratislava		
2007–2012	Sparta Prague		
2012	Slovan Bratislava		
2012–2014	Bohemians Prague	6	(13)
2014–2017	FC Neunkirch	52	(36)
2017–2018	FC Basel	6	(1)
2018–2019	Hellas Verona	12	(1)
2019–2020	Köln	17	(3)
2020–2022	Sparta Prague	39	(7)

International career^{‡}
2006–2022	Slovakia	105	(12)
- * Club domestic league appearances and goals ‡ National team caps and goals as of 15 February 2022

Lucia Ondrušová (born 10 May 1988) is a former Slovak football midfielder, who last played for Sparta Prague in the Czech Women's First League.

== Career ==
Ondrušová previously played for Hellas Verona, and she has also played for PVFA Bratislava and Slovan Bratislava in the Slovak First League, Sparta Prague and Bohemians Prague in the Czech Women's First League, FC Neunkirch, FC Basel in the Nationalliga A and 1. FC Köln in the Bundesliga.

She was a member of the Slovak national team. On 18 February 2021, Ondrušová became first Slovak women footballer, who reach 100 caps for Slovak national team, in a 4–0 win in a friendly match against Malta.

== Career statistics ==
Goals scored for the Slovak WNT in official competitions
Competition	Stage	Date	Location	Opponent	Goals	Result	Overall
2009 UEFA Euro	Qualifiers	2006–11–23	Mensdorf	Malta	1	8–0	1
2011 FIFA World Cup	Qualifiers	2009–09–19	Senec	North Macedonia	1	9–0	1
2015 FIFA World Cup	Qualifiers	2014–09–17	Dravograd	Slovenia	1	0–1	1
2017 UEFA Euro	Qualifiers	2015–12–01	Orhei	Moldova	1	5–0	1

== Career honours ==
=== Club ===
Neunkirch

- Nationalliga A (1): 2017
- Swiss Women's Cup (1): 2017

Bohemians Prague

- Czech Women's Second League (1): 2012–13

Sparta Prague

- Czech Women's First League (5): 2007–08, 2008–09, 2009–10, 2010–11, 2011–12
- Czech Women's Cup (5): 2007–08, 2008–09, 2009–10, 2010–11, 2011–12

== Personal life ==
Ondrušová has her own podcast O ženskom futbale s Lujou on YouTube and football academy Luja Football Academy. Shortly after her football career, she came out as lesbian.
