= Jaroslava Rinnerová-Poláčková =

Czech footballer (born 1955)

Personal information
- Date of birth: 28 October 1955 (age 71)
- Place of birth: Nová Ves pod Pleší, Czechoslovakia
- Position: Forward

Senior career*
Years	Team	Apps	(Gls)
1970–1983	Slavia Prague		
1983–1985	Sparta Prague		
1985–1990	ACF Milan		

International career
1972–1985	Czechoslovakia		
- * Club domestic league appearances and goals

Jaroslava Rinnerová-Poláčková (born 28 October 1955) is a Czech retired football player. She won Czechoslovak women's football championships titles with Slavia Prague and two with Sparta Prague. In 1985 Rinnerová-Poláčková signed with the Serie A team ACF Milan becoming one of the first female Czech professional footballers. After retiring from football Rinnerová-Poláčková became a coach for Slavia Prague.

== International career ==
Rinnerová-Poláčková signing for a professional football team in Italy preventing her from representing Czechoslovakia at the 1988 FIFA Women's Invitation Tournament.

== Honours ==
Slavia Prague

- Czech SR Leagues: (1970, 1971, 1972, 1974, 1975, 1979, 1983)

Sparta Prague

- Czech SR Leagues: 1984, 1985

Individual

- Václav Jíra Awards (2016)
- Medal of Merit (2026)
