= Iva Mocová =

Czech footballer

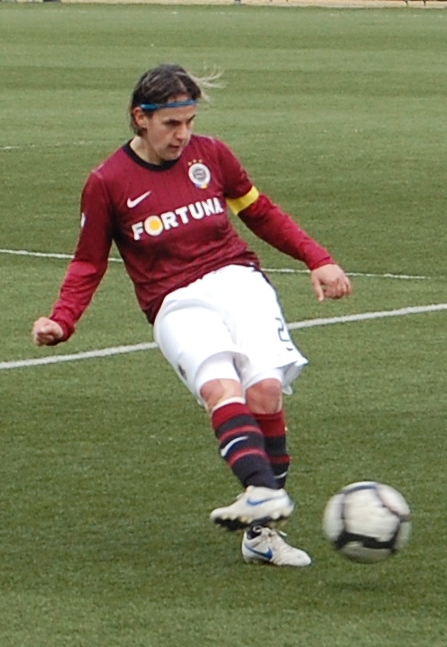
- Mocová in 2012

Personal information
- Date of birth: 23 August 1980 (age 46)
- Place of birth: Frýdlant, Czechoslovakia
- Height: 1.62 m (5 ft 4 in)
- Positions: Defender; striker

Senior career*
Years	Team	Apps	(Gls)
- Česká Lípa
- Slavia Prague
2004–2018	Sparta Prague		

International career^{‡}
2003–2014	Czech Republic	38	(7)

Managerial career
- 2018–2020: Sparta Prague (women) (Assistant)
- 2018–2021: Sparta Prague B (women)
- 2021–: Sparta Prague WU-18
- * Club domestic league appearances and goals ‡ National team caps and goals as of 5 May 2018

Iva Mocová is a retired international Czech football defender, who last played for Sparta Prague.

She had been a member of the Czech national team from 2003. That same year she first played the UEFA Women's Cup with Slavia Prague. Mocová scored two goals in the 2011 World Cup qualifying. She subsequently scored the Czech Republic's first goal in the 2013 Euro qualifying in a 1–1 tie against Austria.

Mocová was named 2023 Coach of the Year - youth women.

== Career honours ==
=== Club ===
Sparta Prague

- Czech Women's First League (9): 2004–05, 2005–06, 2006–07, 2007–08, 2008–09, 2009–10, 2010–11, 2011–12, 2012-13, 2017-18
- Czech Women's Cup (9): 2007–08, 2008–09, 2009–10, 2010–11, 2011–12, 2012–13, 2014–15, 2016–17, 2017–18

Slavia Prague

- Czech Women's First League (2): 2002–03, 2003–04
