= 2011–12 Czech Women's First League =

Czech Women's First League
- Season: 2011–12
- Champions: Sparta Praha (17th title)
- UEFA Women's Champions League: Sparta Praha
- Matches: 56
- Goals: 256 (4.57 per match)
- Top goalscorer: Petra Divišová

The 2011–12 Czech Women's First League was the 19th season of the Czech Republic's top-tier football league for women. Sparta Praha were the defending champions and successfully defended their title.

== Changes from 2010–11 ==
- The league was reduced from nine to eight teams.
- After the regular season a championship round and a relegation round was introduced. The points of the regular season are halved.

== Format ==
The eight teams played each other twice for a total of 14 matches per team. After that the top four teams played a championship round for another six matches per team. The bottom placed four teams play the relegation round. The champion qualified for the UEFA Champions League.

== Regular season ==
=== Standings ===
Pos	Team	Pld	W	D	L	GF	GA	GD	Pts	Qualification
1	Sparta Praha	14	12	2	0	79	4	+75	38	Qualification for championship group
2	Slavia Praha	14	12	2	0	77	4	+73	38	Qualification for championship group
3	Slovácko	14	8	2	4	30	25	+5	26	Qualification for championship group
4	Brno	14	6	2	6	21	26	−5	20	Qualification for championship group
5	Hradec Králové	14	4	2	8	11	39	−28	14	Qualification for relegation group
6	Viktoria Plzeň	14	3	2	9	19	57	−38	11	Qualification for relegation group
7	Baník Ostrava	14	0	6	8	11	50	−39	6	Qualification for relegation group
8	DFO Pardubice	14	1	2	11	8	51	−43	5	Qualification for relegation group

=== Results ===
Home \ Away	BRN	HRK	OST	PAR	SLA	SLO	SPA	VPL
Brno		0–1	3–0	5–0	0–3	1–3	0–5	4–3
Hradec Králové	0–1		3–1	2–1	1–5	0–1	0–11	3–1
Baník Ostrava	2–2	0–0		1–1	0–9	2–7	0–7	2–2
DFO Pardubice	0–1	1–0	1–1		0–6	0–3	0–2	1–4
Slavia Praha	4–0	6–0	3–0	11–0		6–0	1–1	11–0
Slovácko	1–1	1–1	3–1	4–1	0–2		1–3	2–0
Sparta Praha	3–0	9–0	8–0	8–0	1–1	5–1		11–0
Viktoria Plzeň	1–3	1–0	1–1	3–2	1–9	2–3	0–5	

Source: Soccerway
Legend: Blue = home team win; Yellow = draw; Red = away team win.

== Final stage ==
Points of the regular season were halved and rounded up, goal difference was kept.

=== Championship group ===
Played by the teams placed first to fourth of the regular season. Teams play each other twice.

Pos	Team	Pld	W	D	L	GF	GA	GD	Pts	Qualification	SPA	SLA	SLO	BRN
1	Sparta Praha (C)	20	18	2	0	110	5	+105	37	Qualification to Champions League		3–1	4–0	11–0
2	Slavia Praha	20	16	2	2	102	11	+91	31		0–3		3–0	8–1
3	Slovácko	20	9	2	9	36	46	−10	16		0–5	0–4		3–4
4	Brno	20	7	2	11	27	65	−38	13		0–5	0–9	1–3	

Legend: Blue = home team win; Yellow = draw; Red = away team win.
(C) Champions

=== Relegation group ===
Played by the teams placed fifth to eighth of the regular season. Teams play each other twice.

Pos	Team	Pld	W	D	L	GF	GA	GD	Pts	Qualification	VPL	HRK	PAR	OST
5	Viktoria Plzeň	20	7	3	10	41	66	−25	19			4–1	8–0	6–1
6	Hradec Králové	20	6	4	10	23	48	−25	15		1–1		2–2	5–0
7	DFO Pardubice	20	3	5	12	17	61	−44	12		6–0	1–0		0–0
8	Baník Ostrava (O)	20	0	8	12	13	67	−54	5	Qualification for relegation play-offs	0–3	1–3	0–0	

Legend: Blue = home team win; Yellow = draw; Red = away team win.
(O) Play-off winners

== Relegation play-off ==
Eighth place Baník Ostrava played a two-legged play-off against Slovan Liberec. Liberec had won the second league promotion play-off against Jihlava 9–2 on aggregate. Baník Ostrava then won the relegation play-off 5–4 on aggregate and remained in the first division.

9 June 2011
12:00

Baník Ostrava	2 – 2	Slovan Liberec
	Report

Stadion Petřkovice, Ostrava
13 June 2012
17:00

Slovan Liberec	2 – 3	Baník Ostrava
	Report

TJ Krásná Studánka
