= 2010–11 Czech Women's First League =

Czech Women's First League
- Season: 2010–11
- Champions: Sparta Praha (16th title)
- Relegated: Teplice
- UEFA Women's Champions League: Sparta Praha
- Matches: 72
- Goals: 303 (4.21 per match)
- Top goalscorer: Petra Divišová

The 2010–11 Czech Women's First League was the 18th season of the Czech Republic's top-tier football league for women.

== Standings ==
Sparta Praha won the championship. Teplice was relegated.

| Pos | Team | Pld | W | D | L | GF | GA | GD | Pts | Qualification or relegation |
|---|---|---|---|---|---|---|---|---|---|---|
| 1 | Sparta Praha (C) | 16 | 15 | 1 | 0 | 85 | 6 | +79 | 46 | Qualification to Champions League |
| 2 | Slavia Praha | 16 | 14 | 1 | 1 | 74 | 7 | +67 | 43 | |
| 3 | Slovácko | 16 | 10 | 2 | 4 | 42 | 24 | +18 | 32 | |
| 4 | Baník Ostrava | 16 | 7 | 2 | 7 | 21 | 38 | −17 | 23 | |
| 5 | Viktoria Plzeň | 16 | 5 | 2 | 9 | 22 | 30 | −8 | 17 | |
| 6 | Hradec Králové | 16 | 4 | 4 | 8 | 20 | 39 | −19 | 16 | |
| 7 | Brno | 16 | 4 | 3 | 9 | 14 | 30 | −16 | 15 | |
| 8 | DFO Pardubice (O) | 16 | 3 | 5 | 8 | 18 | 51 | −33 | 14 | Qualification for relegation play-offs |
| 9 | Teplice (R) | 16 | 0 | 0 | 16 | 7 | 78 | −71 | 0 | Relegation to Bohemian Football League |

(C) Champions; (O) Play-off winners; (R) Relegated

== Relegation play-off ==
Eighth place Pardubice played a two-legged play-off against Slovan Liberec. Liberec had won the second league promotion play-off against Jihlava 6–0 on aggregate. Pardubice then won the relegation play-off 3–2 on aggregate and remained in the first division.

4 June 2011
15:00

| Slovan Liberec | 1 – 1 | DFO Pardubice |
|---|---|---|
| | Report |

Městský stadion, Liberec
8 June 2011
17:30

| DFO Pardubice | 2 – 1 | Slovan Liberec |
|---|---|---|
| | Report |

Letní Stadion, Pardubice
