= Petra Polášková =

Czech footballer

Personal information
- Full name: Petra Polášková
- Date of birth: 22 June 1979 (age 47)
- Place of birth: Slavičín, Czechoslovakia
- Height: 1.60 m (5 ft 3 in)
- Position: Midfielder

Senior career*
Years	Team	Apps	(Gls)
1993–2015	Slovácko		

International career
1997–2005	Czech Republic	29	(0)
- * Club domestic league appearances and goals

Petra Polášková is a retired Czech football midfielder. She has played throughout her career for 1.FC Slovácko in the Czech First Division.

She has been a member of the Czech national team.
