= Iveta Dudová =

Czech footballer

Personal information
- Full name: Iveta Dudová
- Date of birth: 26 December 1977 (age 48)
- Place of birth: Uherské Hradiště, Czechoslovakia
- Height: 1.68 m (5 ft 6 in)
- Position: Striker

Senior career*
Years	Team	Apps	(Gls)
1993–2003	Compex Otrokovice		(152)

International career
1994–2002	Czech Republic	40	(19)
- * Club domestic league appearances and goals

Iveta Dudová is a Czech former football striker who played for DFC Compex Otrokovice in the Czech First Division. She was a member of the Czech national team for eight years.
