= Czechoslovak women's football championships =

The Czechoslovak women's football championships was a competition in Czechoslovakia in women's football. The competition was organized divided between the two Czechoslovakia nations (Czech Republic and Slovakia) until 1988, the inter-national finals were played in the following years with the Czech teams winning all five of them.

== History ==
The first known Czechoslovak women's football teams were founded in Brno in the 1930s. Sparta Praha and Slavia Praha formed teams in the 1960s. The first international competition in Czechoslovakia was organized in 1966 titled O srdce Mladého světa (Of the Mladý svět heart). The national championships were organized in Slovakia in 1967 and in 1969 in the Czech Republic. The Czechoslovak finals were introduced in the 1988/89 season.

== List of champions ==
Season	Champions of Czech Republic	Champions of Slovak Republic
1967/68	-	Rapid Bratislava
1968/69	-	Dukla ZPA Prešov
1969/70	Slavia Praha	Dukla ZPA Prešov
1970/71	Slavia Praha	Dukla ZPA Prešov
1971/72	Slavia Praha	Dukla ZPA Prešov
1972/73	Uhelné sklady Praha	Dukla ZPA Prešov
1973/74	Slavia Praha	Skloplast Trnava
1974/75	Slavia Praha	Skloplast Trnava
1975/76	Sparta Praha	Skloplast Trnava
1976/77	Sparta Praha	Skloplast Trnava
1977/78	Sparta Praha	Skloplast Trnava
1978/79	Slavia Praha	Skloplast Trnava
1979/80	Sparta Praha	Skloplast Trnava
1980/81	Sparta Praha	Slávia SSM Holíč
1981/82	Sparta Praha	Agrostav Spišská Nová Ves
1982/83	Slavia Praha	Slávia SSM Holíč
1983/84	Sparta Praha	Skloplast Trnava
1984/85	Sparta Praha	Slávia SSM Holíč
1985/86	Sparta Praha	Skloplast Trnava
1986/87	Slavia Praha	Slávia SSM Holíč
1987/88	Slavia Praha	Skloplast Trnava

=== 1988/89 to 1992/93 ===
Season	Champions of Czechoslovakia	Champions of Czech Republic	Champions of Slovak Republic
1988/89	Sparta Praha	Sparta Praha	Skloplast Trnava
1989/90	Sparta Praha	Sparta Praha	Skloplast Trnava
1990/91	Sparta Praha	Sparta Praha	Slávia SSM Holíč
1991/92	Slavia Praha	Slavia Praha	Slávia Filosof Bratislava
1992/93	Slávia Filozof Bratislava	Slavia Praha	Slávia Filozof Bratislava
