= Radka Bednaříková =

Czech footballer

Personal information
- Full name: Radka Bednaříková
- Date of birth: 18 December 1990 (age 35)
- Place of birth: Czechoslovakia
- Height: 1.73 m (5 ft 8 in)
- Position: Goalkeeper

Team information
- Current team: Zlín
- Number: 30

Youth career
- 2002–2003: Vrbno pod Pradědem
- 2003–2005: Karlovice

Senior career*
Years	Team	Apps	(Gls)
2005–2006	DFC Compex		
2006–2011	Slovácko		
2010–2011	→ Brno (loan)		
2012–2013	Baník Ostrava		
2013–	Slovácko		
2017–	Lokomotiva Brno H. H.		
- Sigma Olomouc
- Slovácko
- Zlín

International career^{‡}
2010–	Czech Republic	5	(0)
- * Club domestic league appearances and goals ‡ National team caps and goals as of 31 October 2013

Radka Bednaříková (born 18 December 1990) is a Czech football goalkeeper, currently playing for Zlín in the Czech Women's Second League.

She is a member of the Czech national team. She made her debut on 26 November 2010 in a match against Hungary.
