= Michal Kolomazník =

Czech footballer (born 1976)

Personal information
- Date of birth: 20 July 1976 (age 50)
- Place of birth: Brno, Czechoslovakia
- Height: 1.75 m (5 ft 9 in)
- Position: Striker

Team information
- Current team: Czech Republic wu-17 (manager)

Youth career
- 1984–1993: Zbrojovka Brno/Boby Brno

Senior career*
Years	Team	Apps	(Gls)
1993–1994	Boby Brno	3	(0)
1995	→ SKP Znojmo (loan)	15	(2)
1995–1996	Uherské Hradiště (loan)	13	(3)
1996–1999	Boby Brno	79	(18)
1999–2003	Teplice	108	(22)
2004	Jahn Regensburg	16	(4)
2004–2006	1860 Munich	50	(21)
2006–2008	SpVgg Unterhaching	48	(9)
2008–2010	Dukla Prague	30	(9)

International career
1997	Czech Republic U-21	4	(2)
2000–2002	Czech Republic	3	(1)

Managerial career
- 2016–2017: Dukla Prague (youth)
- 2017–2018: Dukla Prague B
- 2018–2019: Dukla Prague (women)
- 2019–2022: Slavia Prague (women)
- 2022–2023: Silon Táborsko (assistant)
- 2024–2025: Dukla Prague B
- 2025–2026: Czech Republic (women) (assistant)
- 2026–: Czech Republic wu-17
- * Club domestic league appearances and goals

Michal Kolomazník (born 20 July 1976) is a Czech former professional footballer who played as a striker. He played three matches for the Czech Republic national team. He won the Czech Cup with FK Teplice in 2003.

Kolomazník retired from his playing career following repeated problems with a knee injury. His last club was FK Dukla Prague.
