= Diana Bartovičová =

Slovak footballer (born 1993)

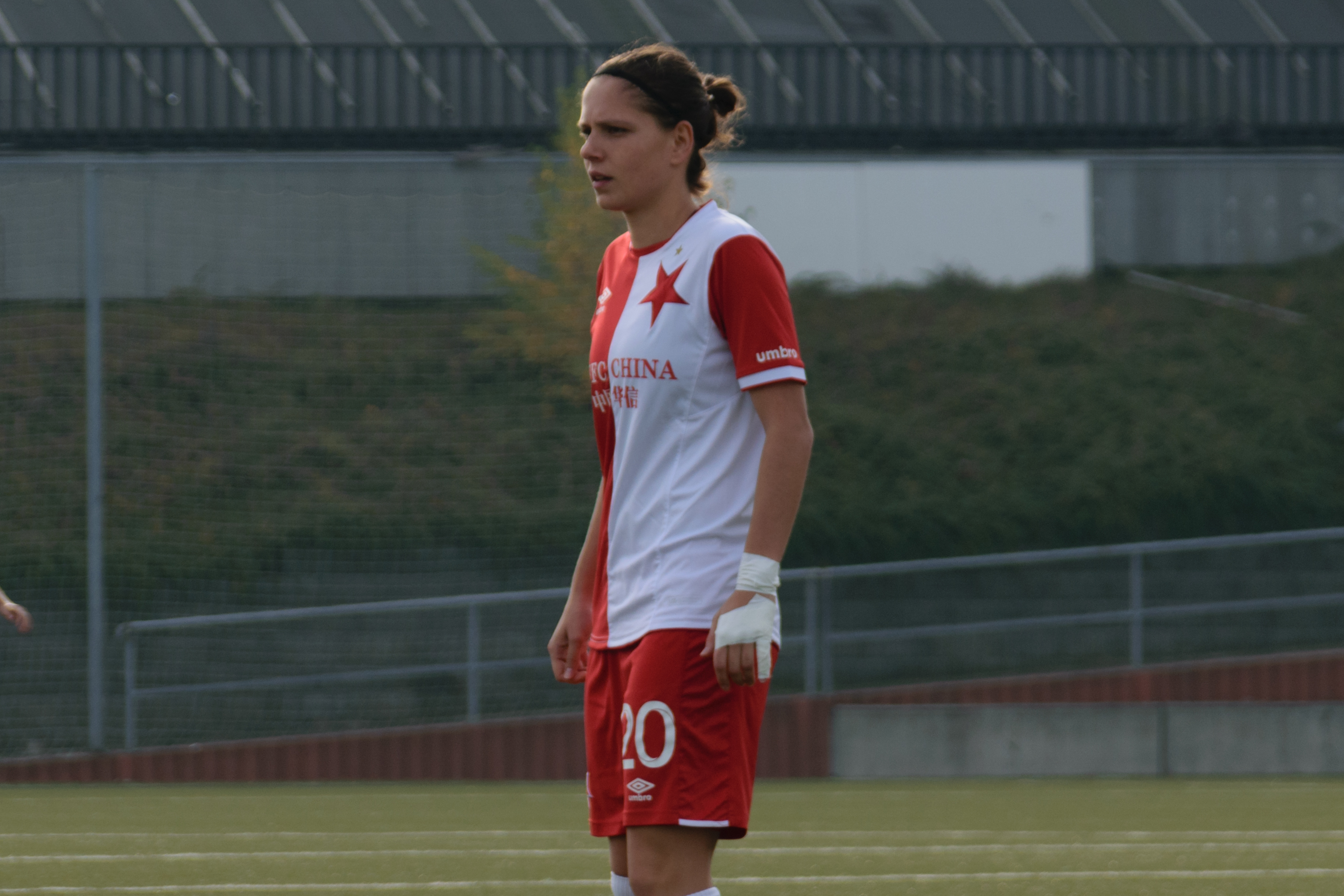
- Bartovičová in 2017

Personal information
- Full name: Diana Bartovičová
- Date of birth: 20 May 1993 (age 33)
- Place of birth: Trenčín, Slovakia
- Position: Midfielder

Team information
- Current team: Slavia Prague
- Number: 20

Senior career*
Years	Team	Apps	(Gls)
2010–2012	Slovácko		
2012–	Slavia Praha		

International career^{‡}
2010–2011	Slovakia U19	6	(0)
2010–	Slovakia	129	(8)
- * Club domestic league appearances and goals ‡ National team caps and goals as of 20 August 2025

Diana Bartovičová (born 20 May 1993) is a Slovak football midfielder currently playing for Slavia Praha in the Czech First Division. She is a member of the Slovak national team.

== International Goals ==
List of international goals scored by Diana Bartovičová
No.	Date	Venue	Opponent	Score	Result	Competition
1	19 November 2011	NTC Senec, Senec, Slovakia	Belarus	3–0	3–0	UEFA Women's Euro 2013 qualifying
2	26 October 2013	Sv. Josip Radnik, Sesvete, Croatia	Croatia	1–0	1–0	2015 FIFA Women's World Cup qualification
