= Czech Women's First League =

- FORTUNA LYGA
- Founded: 1993
- Country: Czech Republic
- Confederation: UEFA
- Divisions: 1
- Number of clubs: 8
- Level on pyramid: 1
- Relegation to: Czech Women's Second League
- Domestic cup: Czech Women's Cup
- International cup(s): UEFA Champions League; UEFA Europa Cup
- Current champions: Sparta Prague (22nd title) (2025–26)
- Most championships: Sparta Prague (22 titles)
- Website: Official
- Current: 2026–27

The Czech Women's First League (Czech: I. liga žen), known as the FORTUNA LYGA for sponsorship reasons, is the top level women's football league of the Czech Republic. The league is dominated by teams of Prague. Sparta Prague won the last championships, Slavia Prague was runner-up. The winning team and runners-up of the league qualifies for the UEFA Women's Champions League.

== History and format ==
As Czechoslovakia dissolved in 1993, also the Czechoslovak women's football championships competitions were discontinued.

The I. liga started as a competition for 12 teams, each playing all other teams twice.

In 2002, the number of teams was reduced to ten and after the regular season was followed with a playoff with eight best teams. In 2006, the system was abandoned and a league of 12 teams was re-instated.

Since 2009-10, only eight teams participated in the league and after the regular season, a playoff system was held. In those two playoff groups, place 1 to 4 for the championship and the relegation group for teams placed between 5th and 8th positions. In 2010–11 nine teams played again only a double-round robin.

Czech Women's First League logo (2019–2024)

Czech Women's First League logo (2024–2026)

== Participating teams in 2026–27 ==
The following eight clubs are competing in the 2026–27 Czech Women's First League.

Club	Stadium	2025–26 Position
Slovácko	Městský stadion	4th
Prague Raptors	Sportareál Satalice	–
AC Sparta Prague	Stadion SK Prosek	1st
Slovan Liberec	Hrádek nad Nisou	3rd
Baník Ostrava	Bazaly	5th
Viktoria Plzeň	Dobřany	7th
Lokomotiva Brno H. H.	Horní Heršpice	6th
SK Slavia Prague	SK Horní Měcholupy	2nd

== Sponsorship ==
In August 2024, FAČR and Czech betting company Fortuna signed a two-year partnership deal with option. In accordance with this deal, the Czech Women's First League will be called FORTUNA=LIGA from the 2024–25 season. On 31 July 2026, the league change its name to FORTUNA LYGA.

== Media coverage ==
Country	Broadcaster
Czech Republic	ČT Sport

== Champions ==
The list of championships is dominated by Sparta Prague:

Season	Champions	Runner-up	Third place	Top Goalscorer	Club
1993–94	Sparta Prague (1)				
1994–95	Sparta Prague (2)				
1995–96	Sparta Prague (3)			(Czech Republic) Gabriela Chlumecká (41)	Sparta Prague
1996–97	Sparta Prague (4)		Viktoria Plzeň		
1997–98	Sparta Prague (5)				
1998–99	Sparta Prague (6)	DFC Prague	Otrokovice	(Czech Republic) Iveta Dudová (39)	Otrokovice
1999–00	Sparta Prague (7)	Slavia Prague	Otrokovice	(Czech Republic) Iveta Dudová (37)	Otrokovice
2000–01	Sparta Prague (8)	Otrokovice	DFC Prague 15	(Czech Republic) Iveta Dudová (45)	Otrokovice
2001–02	Sparta Prague (9)	Slavia Prague		(Czech Republic) Iveta Dudová (31)	Otrokovice
2002–03	Slavia Prague (1)	Sparta Prague			
2003–04	Slavia Prague (2)	Sparta Prague	Hradec Králové		
2004–05	Sparta Prague (10)	Slavia Prague	Hradec Králové	(Czech Republic) Iva Mocová (48)	Sparta Prague
2005–06	Sparta Prague (11)	Slavia Prague	Otrokovice		
2006–07	Sparta Prague (12)	Slavia Prague	Slovácko		
2007–08	Sparta Prague (13)	Slavia Prague	Slovácko		
2008–09	Sparta Prague (14)	Slavia Prague	Slovácko		
2009–10	Sparta Prague (15)	Slavia Prague	Slovácko		
2010–11	Sparta Prague (16)	Slavia Prague	Slovácko	(Czech Republic) Petra Divišová	Slavia Prague
2011–12	Sparta Prague (17)	Slavia Prague	Slovácko	(Czech Republic) Petra Divišová	Slavia Prague
2012–13	Sparta Prague (18)	Slavia Prague	Viktoria Plzeň	(Czech Republic) Petra Divišová (34)	Slavia Prague
2013–14	Slavia Prague (3)	Sparta Prague	Bohemians Prague	(Czech Republic) Petra Divišová (19)	Slavia Prague
2014–15	Slavia Prague (4)	Sparta Prague	Slovácko	(Czech Republic) Lucie Martínková (23)	Sparta Prague
2015–16	Slavia Prague (5)	Sparta Prague	Slovácko	(Czech Republic) Petra Divišová (24)	Slavia Prague
2016–17	Slavia Prague (6)	Sparta Prague	Slovácko	(Czech Republic) Kateřina Svitková (26)	Slavia Prague
2017–18	Sparta Prague (19)	Slavia Prague	Slovácko	(Czech Republic) Kateřina Svitková (24)	Slavia Prague
2018–19	Sparta Prague (20)	Slavia Prague	Slovan Liberec	(Czech Republic) Andrea Stašková (32)	Sparta Prague
2019–20	Slavia Prague (7)	Sparta Prague	Viktoria Plzeň	(Czech Republic) Kateřina Svitková (23)	Slavia Prague
2020–21	Sparta Prague (21)	Slavia Prague	Slovácko	(Czech Republic) Lucie Martínková (37)	Sparta Prague
2021–22	Slavia Prague (8)	Sparta Prague	Slovácko	(Czech Republic) Lucie Martínková (24)	Sparta Prague
2022–23	Slavia Prague (9)	Sparta Prague	Slovácko	(Kenya) Marjolen Nekesa (14)	Slavia Prague
2023–24	Slavia Prague (10)	Sparta Prague	Slovácko	(Kenya) Marjolen Nekesa (23)	Slavia Prague
2024–25	Slavia Prague (11)	Sparta Prague	Slovácko	(Czech Republic) Kateřina Svitková (23)	Slavia Prague
2025–26	Sparta Prague (22)	Slavia Prague	Slovan Liberec	(Czech Republic) Denisa Rancová (17)	Sparta Prague
