= Czech Women's Cup =

Football competition in the Czech Republic

Pohár KFŽ
- Founded: 2007
- Region: Czech Republic
- Teams: 39
- Current champions: Sparta Prague (11th title)
- Most championships: Sparta Prague (11 titles)
- Website: Pohár KFŽ (in Czech)
- 2026–27

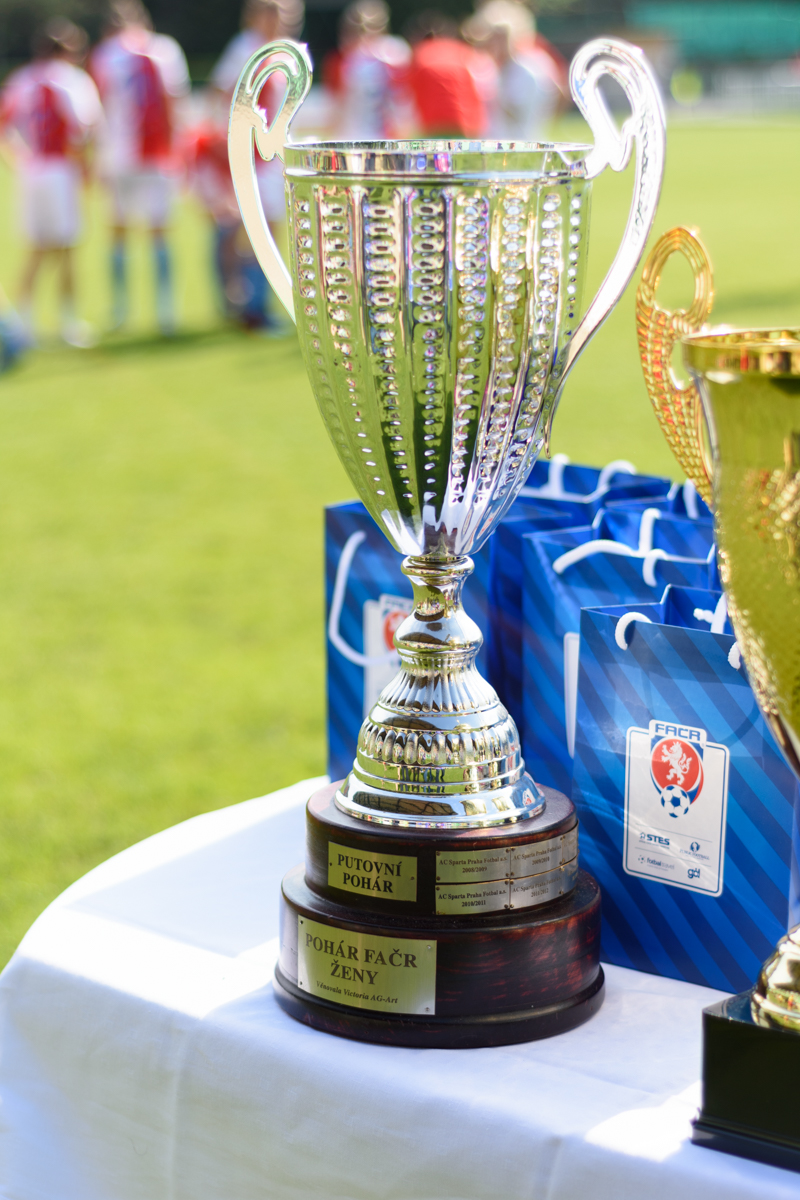
Czech women's cup

The Czech Women's Cup (Czech: Pohár Komise fotbalu žen or Pohár KFŽ), known as the Penny Cup for sponsorship reasons, is the national women's football cup competition in the Czech Republic. It was founded in 2007. The first final was held on 21 June 2008 in Humpolec.

== Format ==
Teams from the first two tiers of women's football are able to enter the cup. Teams from the First League enter the cup only in the third round, which equals the round of 16.

== Sponsorship ==
On 31 July 2026, FAČR and German discount supermarket chain Penny announced a partnership deal. In accordance with this deal, the Czech Women's Cup will be called Penny cup from the 2026–27 season.

== List of finals ==
The following is a list of all finals so far.

Year	Winner	Result	Runner-up	Venue
2007–08	Sparta Prague	5–1	Slavia Prague	Humpolec
2008–09	Sparta Prague	7–0	1. FC Slovácko	Slaný
2009–10	Sparta Prague	8–0	Sokol Stará Lysá	Humpolec
2010–11	Sparta Prague	0–0 a.e.t. (5–4 pen)	Slavia Prague	Čelákovice
2011–12	Sparta Prague	8–0	Pardubice	Plzeň
2012–13	Sparta Prague	2–2 a.e.t. (5–4 pen)	Slavia Prague	Chomutov
2013–14	Slavia Prague	1–0	Sparta Prague	SK Prosek
2014–15	Sparta Prague	0–0 a.e.t. (5–4 pen)	Slavia Prague	SK Prosek
2015–16	Slavia Prague	2–0	Sparta Prague	SK Prosek
2016–17	Sparta Prague	2–0	Slavia Prague	Třeboň
2017–18	Sparta Prague	3–1	1. FC Slovácko	Velké Meziříčí
2018–19	Sparta Prague	1–1 a.e.t. (3–2 pen)	Slavia Prague	SK Prosek
2019–20		Cancelled		
2020–21		Cancelled		
2021–22	Slavia Prague	2–0	Sparta Prague	SK Prosek
2022–23	Slavia Prague	1–1 (4–2 pen)	Sparta Prague	Stadion Kollárova ulice
2023–24	Slavia Prague	2–0	1. FC Slovácko	Velké Meziříčí
2024–25	Slavia Prague	2–1	Sparta Prague	Radotín
2025–26	Sparta Prague	0–0 (4–3 pen)	Slavia Prague	Radotín

== Performance by club ==
Club	Winners	Runners-up	Winning years	Runner-up years
Sparta Prague	11	5	2008, 2009, 2010, 2011, 2012, 2013, 2015, 2017, 2018, 2019, 2026	2014, 2016, 2022, 2023, 2025
Slavia Prague	6	7	2014, 2016, 2022, 2023, 2024, 2025	2008, 2011, 2013, 2015, 2017, 2019, 2026
Slovácko	–	3	–	2009, 2018, 2024
DFO Pardubice	–	1	–	2012
Sokol Stará Lysá	–	1	–	2010

== See also ==
- Czech Cup, men's edition
