= SK DFO Pardubice =

- Full name: SK DFO Pardubice z.s.
- Founded: 1992; 33 years ago as DFO Zdelov
- Dissolved: 2018; 7 years ago
- Ground: Letní stadion
- Capacity: 1 000
- Chairman: Eva Šmeralová
- Manager: Josef Karabinoš
- League: Second Division
- 2018-19: 1st (Promoted)
- Website: http://fkpardubice.cz/news/category/zeny
Home colours	Away colours

SK DFO Pardubice was a Czech women's football team from Pardubice, last played in the 2017–18 Czech Second Division. The club's best finish is 7th place in the First Division, which it achieved in the 2008–09 season. Team merged with FK Pardubice in 2018.

The club celebrated 20 years of existence in 2012.

== Previous seasons ==
The club played in the Second Division for its first eight seasons until finishing second in the 2000–01 season and being promoted to the First Division. After three seasons, the team was relegated, but after winning the 2005–06 Second Division, the team returned to the top flight.

- 1992–2001 Czech Second Division
- 2001–2004 Czech First Division
- 2004–2006 Czech Second Division
- 2006–2016 Czech First Division
- 2016–2018 Czech Second Division

== Historical names ==
- 1992 — DFO Zdelov
- 1999 — DFO Ředice
- 2007 — SK DFO Pardubice
- 2018 — merged with FK Pardubice

== Honours ==
- Czech Second Division
  - Champions 2005–06, 2018–19,
  - Runners-up 2000–01
- Czech Women's Cup
  - Runners-up 2011–12

== Last squad ==
As of 05 August 2020-21

Note: Flags indicate national team as defined under FIFA eligibility rules; some limited exceptions apply. Players may hold more than one non-FIFA nationality.

No.	Pos.	Nation	Player
1	GK	(Czech Republic) CZE	Monika Pavlíčková
2	FW	(Czech Republic) CZE	Karolína Brandejsová
4	DF	(Czech Republic) CZE	Aneta Merklová
5	FW	(Czech Republic) CZE	Kateřina Svobodová
7	DF	(Czech Republic) CZE	Veronika Sehnoutková
8	FW	(Czech Republic) CZE	Martina Dostálová
9	DF	(Czech Republic) CZE	Denisa Kupková
10	DF	(Czech Republic) CZE	Věra Dobrevová

No.	Pos.	Nation	Player
13	DF	(Czech Republic) CZE	Kamila Martínková
14	MF	(Czech Republic) CZE	Lenka Smídová
15	MF	(Slovakia) SVK	Silvia Kunáková
16	MF	(Czech Republic) CZE	Michaela Strachotová
17	MF	(Czech Republic) CZE	Petra Čechová
-	MF	(Czech Republic) CZE	Andrea Havlíčková
-	DF	(Czech Republic) CZE	Lucie Kroutilová
-	GK	(Czech Republic) CZE	Karolína Šrůtková

== Staff ==
Sports secretary

- Veronika Sehnoutková

Manager

- Josef Karabinoš

Assistant

- Martin Macháček

Masseur

- Roman Divoký
