= FC Baník Ostrava (women) =

Baník Ostrava
- Full name: FC Baník Ostrava
- Nickname: Baňky
- Founded: 2010
- Ground: Bazaly
- Manager: Jana Blahová
- League: First League
- 2025–26: 5th
- Website: https://www.fcb.cz/
| Home colours | Away colours |

FC Baník Ostrava is a Czech women's football team from Ostrava, representing FC Baník Ostrava in the Czech Women's First League. It was founded in 2010.

During their first season, the club played its home matches at Stadion v Ludgeřovicích in Ludgeřovice, however in 2011 the club moved to the pitch of non-league side Odra Petřkovice.

== Current squad ==
As of 6 September 2026

Note: Flags indicate national team as defined under FIFA eligibility rules; some limited exceptions apply. Players may hold more than one non-FIFA nationality.

| No. | Pos. | Nation | Player |
|---|---|---|---|
| 1 | GK | CZE | Barbora Růžičková |
| 3 | DF | CZE | Kateřina Gaurová |
| 4 | DF | SVK | Maria Gunišová |
| 5 | DF | CZE | Zuzana Obadalová (captain) |
| 6 | MF | USA | Hannah Tillet |
| 7 | FW | CZE | Klára Waltrová |
| 8 | MF | CZE | Barbora Najvarová |
| 9 | MF | CZE | Viktorie Kubíčková |
| 10 | FW | CZE | Tereza Babičová |
| 11 | FW | CZE | Nela Řehová |
| 12 | DF | CZE | Natálie Kundrtová |

| No. | Pos. | Nation | Player |
|---|---|---|---|
| 13 | MF | SVK | Nikola Pajunková |
| 14 | DF | CZE | Veronika Starzyková |
| 15 | FW | GEO | Tinatin Ambalia |
| 16 | MF | CZE | Karolína Krupníková |
| 17 | MF | SVK | Lenka Plchová |
| 18 | FW | CZE | Kateřina Lachká |
| 19 | FW | CZE | Veronika Štěpánová |
| 20 | DF | CZE | Nela Vondroušová |
| 22 | DF | SVK | Patricia Mudráková |
| 30 | GK | CZE | Šárka Waszutová |
| 47 | FW | POL | Karina Kruk |
| — | GK | CZE | Radka Bednaříková |
