= Stadion SK Prosek =

Football stadium in Prague, Czech Republic

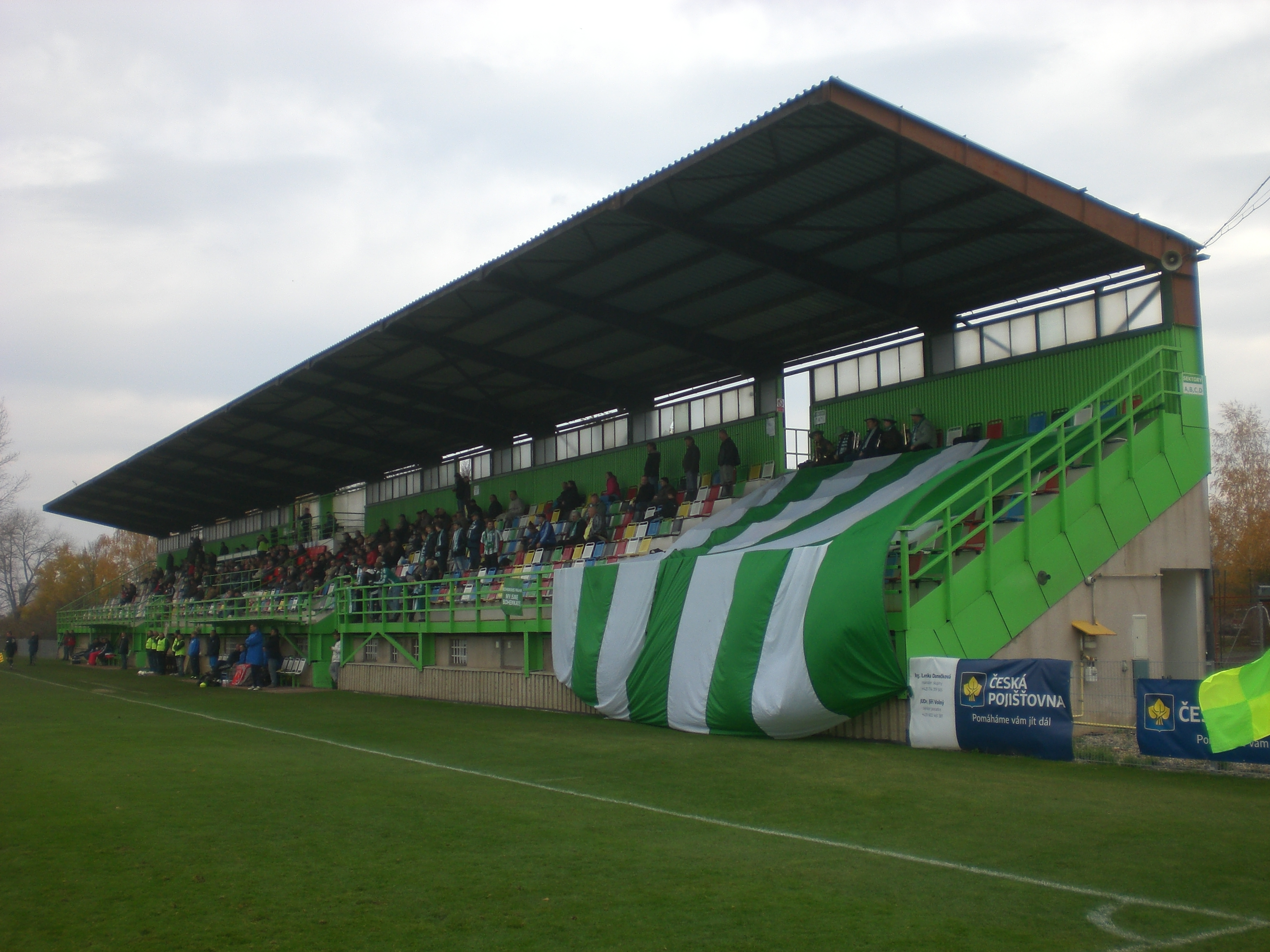
- Interactive map of Stadion SK Prosek
- Location: Lovosická 559; Prague; Czech Republic, 190 00
- Coordinates: 50°7′46.32″N 14°29′57.45″E
- Owner: SK PROSEK PRAHA
- Operator: Fotbalová akademie Praha
- Capacity: 2,600 (1,000 seated)
- Surface: Grass
- Field size: 105m x 68m

Construction
- Groundbreaking: 1976
- Opened: 1985

Tenants
- Prague Black Panthers, FK Bohemians Prague (former); AC Sparta Prague (women)

Stadion SK Prosek is a stadium in Prague, Czech Republic. It is currently used mostly for football matches.

== History ==
When FK Bohemians Prague played in the Czech First League between 2008 and 2010, the ground was not used for league matches, with the club using FK Viktoria Stadion and Stadion Evžena Rošického instead. The club only used the stadium for training. Before the club's promotion to the Czech First League in 2008, the club had played in Horní Počernice. The club moved to the stadium in Střížkov in time for the 2011–12 season, in which they played in the 2. Liga.

On 4 October 2025, Sparta Prague signed a memorandum about cooperation with Prague 9 and 18. Sparta will build a new stadium for women's football academy on the grounds of Stadion SK Prosek.

== Transport ==
The ground is around 8 minutes' walk from the Střížkov metro station.
