= 1. FC Slovácko (women) =

Czech women's association football team

1. FC Slovácko Ženy
- Full name: 1. FC Slovácko Ženy, a.s.
- Founded: 1991; 35 years ago
- Ground: Miroslav Valenty Stadium, Uherské Hradiště
- Capacity: 8,121
- Chairman: Jaroslav Vašíček and Zdeněk Heneš
- Manager: Petr Posolda
- League: First League
- 2025–26: 4th
- Website: https://www.fcslovacko.cz/cs/novinky-zeny
Home colours	Away colours

1. FC Slovácko Ženy is a Czech women's football team from Uherské Hradiště, representing 1. FC Slovácko in the Czech Women's First League. Founded in 1991, it was called DFC Compex and based in Otrokovice (16 kilometers from Uherské Hradiště) before Slovácko bought it in 2006.

It is arguably the third best team in the country after Sparta Prague and Slavia Prague, having ranked 3rd in all six seasons from 2005 to 2011. Slovácko was the championship runner-up in 2001 and 2002, and reached the national Cup final in 2009, 2018 and 2024.

== European Record ==
UEFA Women's Champions League
Season	Round 1	Round 2	Group stage	Quarterfinals	Semifinals	Final
2021–22	(France) Bordeaux					
2021–22	(Denmark) Brøndby					
2022–23	(Belarus) Minsk					
2022–23	(Iceland) Breiðablik					
2023–24	(Germany) Frankfurt					
2023–24	(Kazakhstan) Okzhetpes					

UEFA Women's Europa Cup
Season	Round 1	Round 2	Group stage	Quarterfinals	Semifinals	Final
2025–26		(Germany) Frankfurt				

== Current squad ==
As of 6 September 2026.

Note: Flags indicate national team as defined under FIFA eligibility rules; some limited exceptions apply. Players may hold more than one non-FIFA nationality.

No.	Pos.	Nation	Player
1	GK	SVK	Marína Štefániková
2	DF	USA	Marit Speek
3	DF	SVK	Nina Korimová
4	DF	CZE	Terezie Ohlídalová (captain)
5	DF	CZE	Alžběta Chlumová
6	DF	SVK	Zuzana Masárová
7	FW	SVK	Victoria Havalec
8	MF	CZE	Markéta Jančářová
9	MF	CZE	Albína Goretkiová
10	MF	CZE	Ema Juřeníková
11	DF	CZE	Natálie Trčková
12	MF	CZE	Tereza Veselá
13	DF	CZE	Kristýna Chodurová

No.	Pos.	Nation	Player
14	FW	CZE	Nicole Chromečková
15	FW	SVK	Vanessa Hrušovská
16	DF	CZE	Jolana Sádlová
17	MF	SVK	Darina Hrúziková
18	MF	CZE	Denisa Jonášová
19	FW	CZE	Andrea Gajdušková
20	MF	SVK	Sára Straková
21	MF	SVK	Katarína Bučková
22	MF	SVK	Matilda Sluková
26	DF	CZE	Alžběta Vaněčková
27	DF	CZE	Klára Bláhová
30	GK	CZE	Anežka Zelenková
44	DF	USA	Melissa Nitsche

=== Former internationals ===
- Czech Republic: Klára Cahynová, Iveta Dudová, Jitka Klimková, Kamila Dubcová, Michaela Dubcová
