= SK Slavia Prague (women) =

Slavia Prague
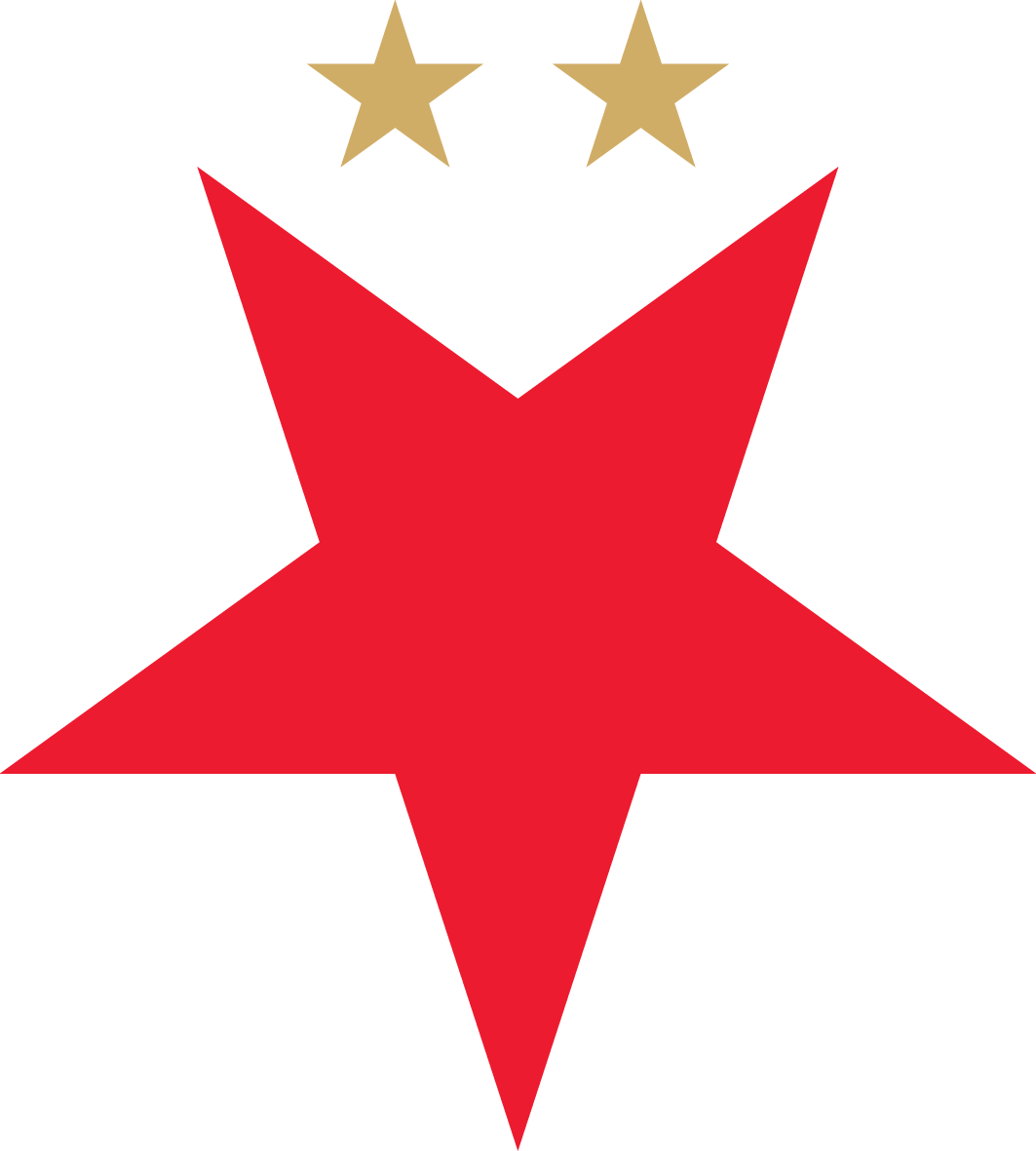
- Full name: Sportovní klub Slavia Praha Ženy
- Ground: Dolní Měcholupy, Prague
- Capacity: 3,400
- Chairman: Jaroslav Tvrdík
- Manager: Filip Klapka
- League: First League
- 2025–26: 2nd
- Website: http://www.slavia.cz/1-liga-zen-2011-2012
Home colours	Away colours

SK Slavia Praha Ženy is a Czech women's football team from Prague representing SK Slavia Prague. It competes in the Czech First Division.

== History ==
Slavia was a pioneer in women's football in Czechoslovakia, and won the first three editions of the Czech SR Championship between 1970 and 1972. It subsequently won six more trophies until 1989, when a final between the Czech and Slovak champions was organized. Slavia were the Czechoslovak champions in 1992 and 1993.

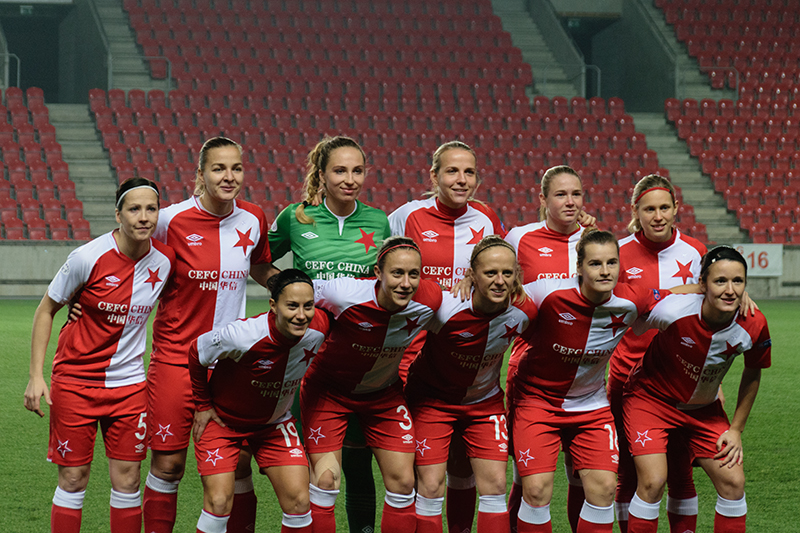
Slavia lineup in 2017, before the game against Stjarnan.

However, rivals Sparta Prague gained the upper hand in the new Czech League following the dissolution of Czechoslovakia. Slavia won the championship for the first time in 2003 and played the 2003-04 UEFA Women's Cup, where it was knocked out in the group stage by defending champion Umea IK. It has always been the league's runner-up since, ranking second to Sparta. In 2011 they were close to winning their first national Cup, but lost the final to Sparta in the penalty shootout. The same happened again in 2013.

In 2014 the team won the double, ending a nine-year-old winning streak of Sparta in the league. It also marked the first time Sparta didn't win the cup.

== Honours ==
- 11 Czech SR Leagues (1970, 1971, 1972, 1974, 1975, 1979, 1983, 1987, 1988, 1992, 1993)
- Czech Women's First League:
  - Winners (11): (2003, 2004, 2014, 2015, 2016, 2017, 2020, 2022, 2023, 2024, 2025)
- Czech Women's Cup:
  - Winners (4): (2014, 2016, 2023, 2024)

== Record in UEFA Competitions ==
All results (home and away) list Slavia's goal tally first.

Season	Competition	Stage	Result	Opponent
2003–04	UEFA Women's Cup	Group Stage	2–0	(Romania) Clujana
2003–04	UEFA Women's Cup	Group Stage	3–0	(Northern Ireland) Newtownabbey Strikers
2003–04	UEFA Women's Cup	Group Stage	1–2	(Sweden) Umea
2004–05	UEFA Women's Cup	Group Stage	4–0	(Slovakia) Žiar nad Hronom
2004–05	UEFA Women's Cup	Group Stage	3–0	(Bulgaria) Super Sport Sofia
2004–05	UEFA Women's Cup	Group Stage	1–2	(Kazakhstan) Alma
2014–15	Champions League	Round of 32	0–1 (H), 0–3 (A)	(Spain) Barcelona
2015–16	Champions League	Round of 32	4–1 (H), 0–1 (A)	(Denmark) Brøndby
2015–16	Champions League	Round of 16	2–1 (H), 0–0 (A)	(Russia) Zvezda Perm
2015–16	Champions League	Quarter-final	1–9 (A), 0–0 (H)	(France) Lyon
2016–17	Champions League	Round of 32	1–1 (A), 3–2 (H)	(Cyprus) Apollon Limassol
2016–17	Champions League	Round of 16	1–3 (H), 0–3 (A)	(Sweden) FC Rosengård
2017-18	Champions League	Round of 32	5–0 (A), 3–0 (H)	(Greece) P.A.O.K
2017-18	Champions League	Round of 16	2–1 (A), 0–0 (H)	(Iceland) Stjarnan
2017-18	Champions League	Quarter-final	0–5 (A), 1–1 (H)	(Germany) VfL Wolfsburg
2018-19	Champions League	Qualifying round	7–2	(Turkey) Ataşehir Belediyespor
2018-19	Champions League	Qualifying round	4–0	(Kosovo) Mitrovica
2018-19	Champions League	Qualifying round	4–1	(Hungary) MTK Hungária
2018-19	Champions League	Round of 32	3–0 (A), 4–0 (H)	(Lithuania) Gintra Universitetas
2018-19	Champions League	Round of 16	3–2 (A), 0–0 (H)	(Sweden) FC Rosengård
2018-19	Champions League	Quarter-final	1–1 (H), 1–5 (A)	(Germany) Bayern Munich
2019–20	Champions League	Round of 32	4–1 (A), 5–1 (H)	(Scotland) Hibernian
2019–20	Champions League	Round of 16	2–5 (H), 0–8 (A)	(England) Arsenal
2020–21	Champions League	Round of 32	2–2 (A), 0–1 (H)	(Italy) Fiorentina
2021–22	Champions League	Round 2	0–3 (A), 0–4 (H)	(England) Arsenal
2022–23	Champions League	Round 2	1–0 (A), 0–0 (H)	(Iceland) Valur
2022–23	Champions League	Group stage	0–2 (H), 0–0 (A)	(Germany) VfL Wolfsburg
2022–23	Champions League	Group stage	0–1 (A), 0–3 (H)	(Italy) Roma
2022–23	Champions League	Group stage	0–1 (H), 1–1 (A)	(Austria) St. Pölten
2023–24	Champions League	Round 2	5–0 (H), 6–0 (A)	(Romania) U Olimpia Cluj
2023–24	Champions League	Group stage	0–9 (H), 2–2 (A)	(France) Lyon
2023–24	Champions League	Group stage	0–1 (A), 0–1 (H)	(Norway) Brann
2023–24	Champions League	Group stage	0–0 (A), 1–0 (H)	(Austria) St. Pölten
2024–25	Champions League	Round 2	2–2 (A), 1–2 (H)	(Turkey) Galatasaray
2025–26	Champions League	Second qualifying round	2–1	(Turkey) ABB Fomget
2025–26	Champions League	Second qualifying round	0–4	(Norway) Vålerenga
2025–26	Europa Cup	Second qualifying round	2–1 (H), 1–2 (A)	Austria Wien
2026–27	Champions League	Second qualifying round	1–2 (a.e.t.)	(Scotland) Rangers
2026–27	Champions League	Second qualifying round	1–1 (3–5 (p))	(Denmark) Brøndby

=== Overview ===
Competition	Played	Won	Drew	Lost	GF	GA	GD	Win%
UEFA Women's Cup	6	4	0	2	14	4	+10	66.67
UEFA Women's Champions League	53	18	14	21	82	93	−11	33.96
Total	59	22	14	23	93	97	−4	37.29

== Players ==
=== Current squad ===
As of 14 February 2025
Note: Flags indicate national team as defined under FIFA eligibility rules; some limited exceptions apply. Players may hold more than one non-FIFA nationality.

No.	Pos.	Nation	Player
6	FW	CZE	Klára Cvrčková
7	FW	SLO	Ana Milović
8	FW	CZE	Kristyna Ruzickova
9	FW	KEN	Marjolen Nekesa
10	MF	SVK	Martina Šurnovská
11	MF	CZE	Barbora Polcarová
12	MF	CZE	Denisa Veselá
13	DF	SVK	Kristína Košíková
14	DF	CZE	Lucie Bendová
15	FW	CZE	Jana Žufánková
16	FW	CZE	Tereza Szewieczková
19	MF	CZE	Petra Divišová

No.	Pos.	Nation	Player
20	DF	SVK	Diana Bartovičová
21	MF	CZE	Kateřina Svitková
23	FW	CZE	Karolína Křivská
25	MF	CZE	Tereza Krejčiříková
27	GK	CZE	Vanesa Jílková
28	FW	SVK	Tamara Morávková
29	MF	SVK	Aneta Surová
30	MF	USA	Molly McLaughlin
32	GK	CZE	Gabriela Sobotkova
33	GK	CZE	Barbora Votíková
34	FW	MNE	Nađa Stanović
37	MF	SVK	Michaela Ferencová
—	MF	SVK	Mária Mikolajová
