= AC Sparta Prague (women) in European football =

This is a compilation of Sparta Prague women's team's results in official international competitions. As of the 2025–26 season, Sparta has taken part in twenty-three editions of the UEFA Women's Cup, UEFA Women's Champions League and UEFA Women's Europa Cup, including the inaugural edition of the tournament.

== Overall Record ==
Season	Competition	Stage	Result	Opponent
2001–02	UEFA Women's Cup	Group stage	0-1	(Sweden) Umeå
2001–02	UEFA Women's Cup	Group stage	1-0	(Hungary) Femina Budapest
2001–02	UEFA Women's Cup	Group stage	7-0	(Bulgaria) Grand Hotel Varna
2002–03	UEFA Women's Cup	Group stage	6-1	(Estonia) Visa Tallinn
2002–03	UEFA Women's Cup	Group stage	4-0	(Faroe Islands) KÍ Klaksvík
2002–03	UEFA Women's Cup	Group stage	1-6	(Sweden) Umeå
2005–06	UEFA Women's Cup	Qualifying Stage	1-1	(Romania) Clujana
2005–06	UEFA Women's Cup	Qualifying Stage	8-0	(Lithuania) Gintra Universitetas
2005–06	UEFA Women's Cup	Qualifying Stage	3-0	(Belarus) Universitet Vitebsk
2005–06	UEFA Women's Cup	Group stage	3-0	(Azerbaijan) Gömrükçü Baku
2005–06	UEFA Women's Cup	Group stage	1-1	(Germany) Frankfurt
2005–06	UEFA Women's Cup	Group stage	1-0	(Switzerland) Lucerne
2005–06	UEFA Women's Cup	Quarter-finals	0-2 0-0	(Sweden) Djurgården
2006–07	UEFA Women's Cup	Group stage	1-3	(Netherlands) Saestum
2006–07	UEFA Women's Cup	Group stage	2-4	(Belgium) Rapide Wezemaal
2006–07	UEFA Women's Cup	Group stage	0-4	(Germany) Turbine Potsdam
2007–08	UEFA Women's Cup	Qualifying Stage	1-1	(Romania) Clujana
2007–08	UEFA Women's Cup	Qualifying Stage	19-0	(Cyprus) AEK Kokkinochovion
2007–08	UEFA Women's Cup	Qualifying Stage	4-3	(Israel) Maccabi Holon
2007–08	UEFA Women's Cup	Group stage	1-3	(Norway) Kolbotn
2007–08	UEFA Women's Cup	Group stage	1-2	(Denmark) Brøndby
2007–08	UEFA Women's Cup	Group stage	1-2	(France) Olympique Lyon
2008–09	UEFA Women's Cup	Qualifying Stage	3-0	(Belgium) Tienen
2008–09	UEFA Women's Cup	Qualifying Stage	9-0	(North Macedonia) Skiponjat
2008–09	UEFA Women's Cup	Qualifying Stage	0-0	(Spain) Levante
2009–10	Champions League	Round of 32	0-1 2-0	(Kazakhstan) Alma KTZ
2009–10	Champions League	Round of 16	0-3 0-2	(England) Arsenal
2010–11	Champions League	Round of 32	3-0 7-0	(Belgium) Sint-Truiden
2010–11	Champions League	Round of 16	0-2 0-1	(Sweden) Linköping
2011–12	Champions League	Round of 32	2-2 2-1	(Cyprus) Apollon Limassol
2011–12	Champions League	Round of 16	0-6 0-6	(France) Olympique Lyon
2012–13	Champions League	Round of 32	3-0 3-0	(Bosnia and Herzegovina) Sarajevo
2012–13	Champions League	Round of 16	0-1 2-2	(Russia) Rossiyanka
2013–14	Champions League	Round of 32	1-2 1-1	(Switzerland) Zürich
2014–15	Champions League	Round of 32	1-1 1-1	(Lithuania) Gintra Universitetas
2016–17	Champions League	Round of 32	0-2 1-3	(Netherlands) Twente
2017–18	Champions League	Round of 32	5-0 3-0	(Greece) P.A.O.K
2017–18	Champions League	Round of 16	1-1 0-3	(Sweden) Linköping
2018–19	Champions League	Round of 32	0-2 1-2	(Netherlands) Ajax
2019–20	Champions League	Round of 32	2-3 0-1	(Iceland) Breiðablik
2020–21	Champions League	Round of 32	2-1 1-0	(Scotland) Glasgow City
2020–21	Champions League	Round of 16	0-5 3-0	(France) Paris Saint-Germain
2021–22	Champions League	Round 2	0-1 0-2	(Denmark) Køge
2022–23	Champions League	Round 2	1-2 1-4	(Italy) Roma
2023–24	Champions League	Round 2	0-5 0-3	(Germany) Eintracht Frankfurt
2024–25	Champions League	Round 1	3-1	(Sweden) Linköping
2024–25	Champions League	Round 1	0-2	(France) Paris
2025–26	Champions League	Round 2	4-4	(Denmark) Nordsjælland
2025–26	Champions League	Round 2	1-5	(Italy) Roma
2025–26	Europa Cup	Round 2	0-0 5-0	(Hungary) Ferencvárosi
2025–26	Europa Cup	Round of 16	0-3 4-0	(Switzerland) Young Boys
2025–26	Europa Cup	Quarter-finals	0-0 3-1	Austria Wien
2025–26	Europa Cup	Semi-finals	2-3 0-2	(Sweden) Hammarby
2026–27	Champions League	Round 3	3-2 0-3	(Switzerland) Servette Chênois
2026–27	Europa Cup	Round 2	4-1 4-0	(Romania) Farul Constanța
2026–27	Europa Cup	Round of 16	2-2 0-3	(Portugal) Torreense

== 2001-02 UEFA Women's Cup ==
=== First stage ===
3 October 2001

Umeå (Sweden)	1 – 0	(Czech Republic) Sparta Prague
Sjöström 67'

Gammliavallen, Umeå
Attendance: 1,486
5 October 2001

Sparta Prague (Czech Republic)	1 – 0	(Hungary) Femina Budapest
Macková 8'

Gammliavallen, Umeå
7 October 2001

Sparta Prague (Czech Republic)	7 – 0	(Bulgaria) Grand Hotel Varna
Chlumecká 17', 25', 29', 59'; Mazlová 39'; Pincová 51', 70'

Tegstunet, Umeå

== 2002-03 UEFA Women's Cup ==
=== First stage ===
25 September 2002

Sparta Prague (Czech Republic)	6 – 0	(Estonia) Visa Tallinn
Došková 13', 25'; Holan 63', 75'; Knavová 72'; Mouchová 83'

Gammliavallen, Umeå
27 September 2002

Sparta Prague (Czech Republic)	4 – 0	(Faroe Islands) KÍ
Došková 24'; Knavová 41'; Holan 43', 58'

29 September 2002

Umeå (Sweden)	6 – 1	(Czech Republic) Sparta Prague
Kapstad 15'; Ljungberg 17'; Moström 21'; Dahlqvist 22'; Marklund 26'; Sjöström 30'		L. Martínková 12'

== 2005-06 UEFA Women's Cup ==
=== Preliminary stage ===
9 August 2005

Sparta Prague (Czech Republic)	1 – 1	(Romania) CFF Clujana
Ciglbauerová 9' (pen.)		Sucila 83'

Prague
11 August 2005

Sparta Prague (Czech Republic)	8 – 0	(Lithuania) Gintra Universitetas
Ciglbauerová 36' (pen.); Šmeralová 51'; Kirjanovaitė 60' (o.g.); Bertholdová 71', 87'; Došková 74'; Matysová 80'; Kohoutová 90+3'

Slaný
13 August 2005

Sparta Prague (Czech Republic)	3 – 0	(Belarus) Universitet Vitebsk
Martínková 12'; Mocová 49', 90+1'

Prague

=== First stage ===
13 September 2005

Sparta Prague (Czech Republic)	3 – 0	(Azerbaijan) Gömrükçü Baku
Mocová 2'; Ciglbauerová 30'; Mouchová 88'

Lucern
15 September 2005

Sparta Prague (Czech Republic)	1 – 1	(Germany) 1. FFC Frankfurt
Ringelová 88'		Smisek 65'

Lucern
17 September 2005

SC LUwin.ch (Switzerland)	0 – 1	(Czech Republic) Sparta Prague
		Bertholdová 39'

Lucern

=== Quarter-finals ===
11 October 2005
18:00 (CET)

Sparta Prague (Czech Republic)	0 – 2	(Sweden) Djurgården
		Svensson 54' 70'

Sparta Stadium, Prague
Referee: (Germany) Christine Frai
19 October 2005
19:00 (CET)

Djurgårdens IF (Sweden)	0 – 0	(Czech Republic) Sparta Prague

Stockholms, Stockholm
Referee: (Lithuania) Ausra Tvarijonaite

== 2006-07 UEFA Women's Cup ==
=== First stage ===
12 September 2006

SV Saestum (Netherlands)	3 – 1	(Czech Republic) Sparta Prague
Smith 6'; Googendijk 17'; Louwaars 90+2'		Došková 11'

Zeist
14 September 2006

Rapide Wezemaal (Belgium)	4 – 2	(Czech Republic) Sparta Prague
Maes 26'; Timmermans 68'; Vandepour 82'; Meeus 89'		I. Martínková 4'; Mocová 9'

Zeist
17 September 2006

Turbine Potsdam (Germany)	4 – 0	(Czech Republic) Sparta Prague
I. Kerschowski 5'; Hingst 17'; Pohlers 33'; Kameraj 58'

Zeist

== 2007-08 UEFA Women's Cup ==
=== Preliminary stage ===
9 August 2007

Sparta Prague (Czech Republic)	1 – 1	(Romania) CFF Clujana
L. Martínková 86'		Spânu 22'

Israel
11 August 2007

Sparta Prague (Czech Republic)	19 – 0	(Cyprus) AEK Kokkinochovion
Bertholdová 6', 13', 32'; L. Martínková 25', 37', 39'; Ondrušová 33', 53'; Pivoňková 43'; Knavová 57'; I. Martínková 64'; Kladrubská 69', 70'; Došková 72', 85'; Heroldová 83', 89', 90'; Ringelová 90+1'

Israel
9 August 2007

Maccabi Holon (Israel)	3 – 4	(Czech Republic) Sparta Prague
Ohana 6'; Redman 8'; ? 40' (o.g.)		L. Martínková 24'; Kladrubská 54'; Ringelová 74'; Bertholdová 81'

Israel

=== First stage ===
11 October 2007

Kolbotn Fotball (Norway)	3 – 1	(Czech Republic) Sparta Prague
Angus 3'; Solveig Gulbrandsen 70', 73'		Kladrubská 62'

France
13 October 2007

Brøndby IF (Denmark)	2 – 1	(Czech Republic) Sparta Prague
? 49' (o.g.); Jensen 82'		Mouchová 21'

France
16 October 2007

Olympique Lyonnais (France)	2 – 1	(Czech Republic) Sparta Prague
Abily 50'; Renard 55'		Bertholdová 80'

France

== 2008-09 UEFA Women's Cup ==
=== Preliminary stage ===
4 September 2008

Sparta Prague (Czech Republic)	3 – 0	(Belgium) KVK Tienen
Ondrušová 9'; Šmeralová 39'; L. Martínková 62'

Skopje
6 September 2008

ZFK Skiponjat (North Macedonia)	0 – 9	(Czech Republic) Sparta Prague
		Ringelová 29'; L. Martínková 44', 52'; Došková 45'; Pivoňková 47'; Heroldová 63'; Šmeralová 86', 87'; Ondrušová 90'

Skopje
9 September 2008

Levante UD (Spain)	0 – 0	(Czech Republic) Sparta Prague

Skopje

== 2009-10 UEFA Women's Champions League ==
=== Round of 32 ===
30 September 2009
11:00

Alma KTZh (Kazakhstan)	1 – 0	(Czech Republic) Sparta Prague
Zhanatayeva 49'

Almaty
Attendance: 1,200
Referee: (Norway) Ann Helen Ostervold
7 October 2009
15:00

Sparta Prague (Czech Republic)	2 – 0	(Kazakhstan) Alma KTZh
Ondrušová 17', 37'

Stadion na Plynárně, Prague
Attendance: 360
Referee: (France) Florence Guillemin

=== Round of 16 ===
4 November 2009
18:00

Sparta Prague (Czech Republic)	0 – 3	(England) Arsenal FC
		Flaherty 11'; Grant 27'; Little 55' (pen.)

Generali Arena, Prague
Attendance: 1,975
Referee: (France) Florence Guillemin
11 November 2009
14:30

Arsenal FC (England)	2 – 0	(Czech Republic) Sparta Prague
Heroldová 31' (o.g.); Little 56'

London
Attendance: 312
Referee: (Greece) Efthalia Mitsi

== 2010-11 UEFA Women's Champions League ==
=== Round of 32 ===
29 September 2010
20:00 (CET)

Sint-Truidense VV (Belgium)	0 – 3	(Czech Republic) Sparta Prague
		L. Martínková 5'; Kožárová 67'; Čulová 85'

Sint-Truiden
Attendance: 215
Referee: (Poland) Karolina Radzik-Johan
14 October 2010
15:30 (CET)

Sparta Prague (Czech Republic)	7 – 0	(Belgium) Sint-Truidense VV
L. Martínková 27', 38'; Pivoňková 36'; Ondrušová 53', 85'; I. Martínková 76'

Stadion na Plynárně, Prague
Attendance: 300
Referee: (Sweden) Jenny Palmqvist

=== Round of 16 ===
3 November 2010
13:00 (CET)

Linköping (Sweden)	2 – 0	(Czech Republic) Sparta Prague
Rohlin 55'; Samuelsson 81'

Folkungavallen, Linköping
Attendance: 354
Referee: (Russia) Natalia Avdonchenko
10 November 2010
14:30 (CET)

Sparta Prague (Czech Republic)	0 – 1	(Sweden) Linköping
		Asllani 62'

Stadion na Plynárně, Prague
Attendance: 330
Referee: (Finland) Kirsi Heikkinen

== 2011-12 UEFA Women's Champions League ==
=== Round of 32 ===
28 September 2011
18:00

Apollon Limassol (Cyprus)	2 – 2	(Czech Republic) Sparta Prague
Kostova 16'; Rus 64'		L. Martínková 10'; Danihelková 90+2'

Tsirion Stadium, Limassol
Attendance: 800
Referee: (Norway) Christina W. Pedersen
5 October 2011
17:00

Sparta Prague (Czech Republic)	2 – 1	(Cyprus) Apollon Limassol
L. Martínková 3', 40'		Solomou 7'

Areál SK Aritma, Prague
Attendance: 380
Referee: (Russia) Anastasia Pustovoitova

=== Round of 16 ===
3 November 2011
14:00

Sparta Praha (Czech Republic)	0 – 6	(France) Olympique Lyonnais
		Schelin 21', 26'; Thomis 56'; Le Sommer 58', 85' (pen.); Franco 75'

Stadion na Plynárně, Prague
Attendance: 394
Referee: (Hungary) Katalin Kulcsár
9 November 2011
19:00

Olympique Lyonnais (France)	6 – 0	(Czech Republic) Sparta Praha
Dickenmann 3'; Abily 46', 50'; Schelin 58'; Necib 66'; Georges 86'

Stade de Gerland, Lyon
Attendance: 6,461
Referee: (Malta) Esther Azzopardi

== 2012-13 UEFA Women's Champions League ==
=== Round of 32 ===
27 September 2012
16:00

SFK Sarajevo (Bosnia and Herzegovina)	0 – 3	(Czech Republic) Sparta Praha
		L. Martínková 58', 85'; Voňková 68'

Asim Ferhatović Hase Stadium, Sarajevo
Attendance: 80
Referee: (France) Florence Guillemin
11 October 2012
15:00

Sparta Praha (Czech Republic)	3 – 0	(Bosnia and Herzegovina) SFK Sarajevo
Voňková 10'; L. Martínková 72'; Danihelková 85'

FK Viktoria Stadion, Prague
Attendance: 310
Referee: (Sweden) Pernilla Larsson

=== Round of 16 ===
1 November 2012
14:00

Sparta Praha (Czech Republic)	0 – 1	(Russia) FK Rossiyanka
		Oparanozie 12'

Stadion SK Prosek, Prague
Attendance: 525
Referee: (Norway) Christina W. Pedersen
8 November 2012
14:00

FK Rossiyanka (Russia)	2 – 2	(Czech Republic) Sparta Praha
Vyštejnová 53' (o.g.); Fabiana 63'		Voňková 3'; Danihelková 90+4'

Rodina Stadium, Khimki
Attendance: 100
Referee: (Hungary) Katalin Kulcsár

== 2013-14 UEFA Women's Champions League ==
=== Round of 32 ===
9 October 2013
19:00

Zürich (Switzerland)	2 – 1	(Czech Republic) Sparta Prague
Zehnder 24'; Kiwic 60'		Bartoňová 44'

Letzigrund, Zürich
Attendance: 3,327
Referee: (Sweden) Sara Persson
16 October 2013
20:00

Sparta Praha (Czech Republic)	1 – 1	(Switzerland) Zürich
Mocová 66'		Selimi 16'

Generali Arena, Prague
Attendance: 1,843
Referee: (England) Amy Rayner

== 2014-15 UEFA Women's Champions League ==
=== Round of 32 ===
8 October 2014
17:00

Gintra Universitetas (Lithuania)	1 – 1	(Czech Republic) Sparta Prague
Vaičiulaitytė 81'		Křivská 42'

Savivaldybė Stadium, Šiauliai
Attendance: 1,200
Referee: (Belgium) Sharon Sluyts
15 October 2014
18:00

Sparta Praha (Czech Republic)	1 – 1	(Lithuania) Gintra Universitetas
Bertholdová 59'		Imanalijeva 37'
Penalties
Hloupá (penalty scored); Bertholdová (penalty scored); Bartoňová (penalty scored); Čulová (penalty scored); Křivská (penalty missed); Krejčiříková (penalty missed)	4–5	(penalty scored) Budrytė; (penalty scored) Alekperova; (penalty scored) Laetitia; (penalty missed) Chinasa; (penalty scored) Budestean; (penalty scored) Imanalijeva

Generali Arena, Prague
Attendance: 1,015
Referee: (Spain) Elia Martínez

== 2016-17 UEFA Women's Champions League ==
=== Round of 32 ===
5 October 2016
19:00

Twente (Netherlands)	2 – 0	(Czech Republic) Sparta Prague
Waldus 79'; Roord 90+1'

De Grolsch Veste, Enschede
Attendance: 2,365
Referee: (Spain) Marta Huerta
12 October 2016
18:00

Sparta Praha (Czech Republic)	1 – 3	(Netherlands) Twente
Stašková 34'		Odehnalová 28' (o.g.); R. Jansen 82'; Roord 89'

Generali Arena, Prague
Attendance: 876
Referee: (Sweden) Linn Andersson

== 2017-18 UEFA Women's Champions League ==
=== Round of 32 ===
4 October 2017
17:00

P.A.O.K (Greece)	0 – 5	(Czech Republic) Sparta Prague
		I. Martínková 14', 45+1', 87'; Hälinen 61'; Kladrubská 82'

Toumba Stadium, Thessaloniki
Referee: (Finland) Ifeoma Kulmala
11 October 2017
18:00

Sparta Praha (Czech Republic)	3 – 0	(Greece) P.A.O.K
Stašková 27', 88'; Mocová 61'

Generali Arena, Prague
Attendance: 526
Referee: (England) Rebecca Welch

=== Round of 16 ===
8 November 2017
18:00 (CET)

Sparta Prague (Czech Republic)	1 – 1	(Sweden) Linköping
Strom 47'		Hurtig 54'

Generali Arena, Prague
Attendance: 489
Referee: (Switzerland) Désirée Grundbacher
15 November 2017
18:00 (CET)

Linköping (Sweden)	3 – 0	(Czech Republic) Sparta Prague
Hurtig 18'; Minde 78'; Sørensen 86'

Linköping Arena, Linköping
Attendance: 701
Referee: (Germany) Angelika Soeder

== 2018-19 UEFA Women's Champions League ==
=== Round of 32 ===
12 September 2018
19:00

Ajax (Netherlands)	2 – 0	(Czech Republic) Sparta Prague
Salmi 47'; Zeeman 55'

Sportpark De Toekomst, Ouder-Amstel
Referee: (Turkey) Melis Özçiğdem
26 September 2018
18:00

Sparta Praha (Czech Republic)	1 – 2	(Netherlands) Ajax
Burkenroad 27'		Lewerissa 50', 52'

Generali Arena, Prague
Attendance: 558
Referee: (Portugal) Silvia Domingos

== 2019-20 UEFA Women's Champions League ==
=== Round of 32 ===
11 September 2019
21:15

Breiðablik (Iceland)	3 – 2	(Czech Republic) Sparta Prague
Þorvaldsdóttir 15', 78'; Vilhjálmsdóttir 80'	Report	Burkenroad 3', 36'

Kópavogsvöllur, Kópavogur
Referee: (Greece) Eleni Antoniou
26 September 2019
18:00

Sparta Praha (Czech Republic)	0 – 1	(Iceland) Breiðablik
	Report	Þorvaldsdóttir 55'

Stadion Letná, Prague
Attendance: 721
Referee: (Poland) Monika Mularczyk

== 2020-21 UEFA Women's Champions League ==
=== Round of 32 ===
9 December 2020
15:00

Sparta Prague (Czech Republic)	2 – 1	(Scotland) Glasgow City
L. Martínková 34'; Dlasková 41'	Report	Wojcik 51'

Letní stadion, Chomutov
Attendance: 0
Referee: (Hungary) Eszter Urban
16 December 2020
20:00

Glasgow City (Scotland)	0 – 1	(Czech Republic) Sparta Prague
	Report	L. Martínková 7'

Broadwood Stadium, Cumbernauld
Attendance: 0
Referee: (Portugal) Silvia Domingos

=== Round of 16 ===
9 March 2021
16:00

Paris Saint-Germain (France)	5 – 0	(Czech Republic) Sparta Prague
Katoto 29', 36'; Bachmann 55'; Lawrence 64'; Luana 82'	Report

Stade Municipal Georges Lefèvre, Saint-Germain-en-Laye
Referee: (Denmark) Frida Nielsen
17 March 2021
14:30

Sparta Prague (Czech Republic)	3 – 0 Awarded	(France) Paris Saint-Germain
	Report

Letní stadion, Chomutov
Referee: (Hungary) Katalin Kulcsár

== 2021-22 UEFA Women's Champions League ==
=== Round 2 ===
1 September 2021
18:00

Sparta Prague (Czech Republic)	0 – 1	(Denmark) HB Køge
	Report	Kramer 73'

Letní stadion, Chomutov
Referee: (Hungary) Katalin Sipos
8 September 2021
18:00

HB Køge (Denmark)	2 – 0	(Czech Republic) Sparta Praha
Fløe Nielsen 53'; Kramer 83'	Report

Køge Stadium, Køge
Attendance: 909
Referee: (Germany) Karoline Wacker

== 2022-23 UEFA Women's Champions League ==
=== Round 2 ===
21 September 2022
18:30

Sparta Prague (Czech Republic)	1 – 2	(Italy) Roma
Martínková 51'	Report	Bartoli 78'; Haavi 90'

Stadion Letná, Prague
Attendance: 1,682
Referee: (Lithuania) Justina Lavrenovaitė-Perez
29 September 2022
14:30

Roma (Italy)	4–1	(Czech Republic) Sparta Prague
Wenninger 35'; Andressa 55'; Minami 70'; Haavi 82'	Report	Bertholdová 25'

Estadio Tre Fontane, Rome
Attendance: 990
Referee: (Serbia) Jelena Međedović

== 2023-24 UEFA Women's Champions League ==
=== Round 2 ===
10 October 2023
19:00

Eintracht Frankfurt (Germany)	5 – 0	(Czech Republic) Sparta Prague
Anyomi 6'; Freigang 14' (pen.), 76', 77'; Reuteler 58'	Report

Waldstadion, Frankfurt
Attendance: 5,500
Referee: Kristina Georgieva (Bulgaria)
18 October 2023
18:30

Sparta Prague (Czech Republic)	0 – 3	(Germany) Eintracht Frankfurt
	Report	Dunst 18', 33', 43'

Stadion Letná, Prague
Attendance: 1,464
Referee: Abigail Byrne (England)

== 2024-25 UEFA Women's Champions League ==
=== Round 1 ===
4 September 2024
19:00

Sparta Prague (Czech Republic)	3–1 (a.e.t.)	(Sweden) Linköping
N. Karlsson 67' (o.g.); Kotrčová 103'; Bartoňová 119' (pen.)	Report	Beard 48'

Linköping Arena, Linköping
Referee: Réka Molnár (Hungary)
7 September 2024
18:00

Paris (France)	2–0	(Czech Republic) Sparta Prague
Matéo 36'; Korošec 85'	Report

Linköping Arena, Linköping
Attendance: 179
Referee: Deborah Anex (Switzerland)

== 2025-26 UEFA Women's Champions League ==
=== Round 2 ===
27 August 2025
17:00

Sparta Prague (Czech Republic)	4–4 (a.e.t.)	(Denmark) Nordsjælland
Bergford 14', 33', 54'; Khýrová 26'	Report	Walter 46'; Wisnewski 67'; Engsig-Karup 72'; Stárová 89' (o.g.)
Penalties
Bartoňová (penalty scored); Hansen (penalty missed); Stárová (penalty scored); Rancová (penalty scored); Sonntagová (penalty scored)	4–3	(penalty scored) Larsen; (penalty missed) Knudsen; (penalty scored) Scheuer; (penalty scored) Walter; (penalty missed) Wisnewski

Stadion Letná, Prague
Attendance: 812
Referee: Milica Milovanović (Serbia)
30 August 2025
15:00

Roma (Italy)	5–1	(Czech Republic) Sparta Prague
Haavi 30'; Di Guglielmo 52'; Giugliano 55', 72'; Pandini 79'	Report	Dědinová 87'

Stadion SK Prosek, Prague
Attendance: 407
Referee: Lotta Vuorio (Finland)

== 2025–26 UEFA Women's Europa Cup ==
=== Round 2 ===
8 October 2025
19:00

Sparta Prague (Czech Republic)	0–0	(Hungary) Ferencvárosi
	Report

Stadion Letná, Prague
Referee: Caroline Lanssens (Belgium)
16 October 2025
14:00

Ferencvárosi (Hungary)	0–5	(Czech Republic) Sparta Prague
	Report	Bergford 7'; Černá 19'; Bartoňová 47'; Frajtović 58' (o.g.); Huvarová 83'

Hévízi úti Stadion, Budapest
Attendance: 326
Referee: Merima Čelik (Bosnia and Herzegovina)

=== Round of 16 ===
12 November 2025
18:45

Sparta Prague (Czech Republic)	0–3	(Switzerland) Young Boys
	Report	Jelčić 52'; Jiménez 62'; Ess 84'

Stadion Letná, Prague
Attendance: 1,083
Referee: Ainara Acevedo (Spain)
19 November 2025
18:00

Young Boys (Switzerland)	0–4	(Czech Republic) Sparta Prague
	Report	Černá 15'; Khýrová 18', 36', 90+3'

Stadion Wankdorf, Bern
Attendance: 1,661
Referee: Aleksandra Česen (Slovenia)

=== Quarter-finals ===
11 February 2026
12:00

Sparta Prague (Czech Republic)	0–0	Austria Wien
	Report

Stadion Letná, Prague
Referee: Olatz Rivera Olmedo (Spain)
18 February 2026
19:30

Austria Wien	1–3 (a.e.t.)	(Czech Republic) Sparta Prague
Cordes 72'	Report	Stárová 70'; Bergford 98'; Khýrová 105+1'

Franz Horr Stadium, Vienna
Referee: Catarina Campos (Portugal)

=== Semi-finals ===
25 March 2026
18:00

Sparta Prague (Czech Republic)	2–3	(Sweden) Hammarby
Stárová 60'; Khýrová 83'	Report	Sørum 45+1'; Reidy 86'; Peterson 90+2'

Stadion Letná, Prague
Attendance: 1,859
Referee: Eleni Antoniou (Greece)
2 April 2026
19:00

Hammarby IF (Sweden)	2–0	(Czech Republic) Sparta Prague
Peterson 33'; Hasund 62'	Report

3Arena, Stockholm
Attendance: 5,260
Referee: Silvia Gasperotti (Italy)

== 2026-27 UEFA Women's Champions League ==
=== Round 3 ===
26 August 2026
18:30

Sparta Prague (Czech Republic)	3–2	(Switzerland) Servette Chênois
Černá 9'; Rancová 45+2'; Bartoňová 68'	Report	Sobal 15'; Hernández 73'

Stadion Letná, Prague
Attendance: 1,063
Referee: Jelena Cvetković (Serbia)
2 September 2026
18:45

Servette Chênois (Switzerland)	3–0	(Czech Republic) Sparta Prague
Sobal 20', 90+2'; Marinelli 45+1'	Report

Stade de Genève, Geneva
Attendance: 1,712
Referee: Fabienne Michel (Germany)

== 2026–27 UEFA Women's Europa Cup ==
=== Round 2 ===
23 September 2026
18:00

Sparta Prague (Czech Republic)	4–1	(Romania) Farul Constanța
Ospeck 26'; Bartoňová 52' (pen.); Hansen 70'; Khýrová 83'	Report	Stancu 42'

Stadion Letná, Prague
Attendance: 522
Referee: Marina Živković (Serbia)
30 September 2026
16:00

Farul Constanța (Romania)	0–4	(Czech Republic) Sparta Prague
	Report	Bergford 28'; Ospeck 48'; Rancová 69'; Huvarová 90'

Central Stadium, Ovidiu
Attendance: 328
Referee: Maika Vanderstichel (France)

=== Round of 16 ===
29 October 2026
18:00

Sparta Prague (Czech Republic)	2–2	(Portugal) Torreense
Bergford 34'; Paulenová 90+3'	Report	Konst 57'; Hayes 70'

Stadion Letná, Prague
Attendance: 527
Referee: Sofiya Prychyna (Ukraine)
12 November 2026
19:00

Torreense (Portugal)	3–0	(Czech Republic) Sparta Prague
Weimer 11' (pen.); Pereira 66'; Konst 87'	Report

SC Uniao Torreense sporting complex, Torres Vedras
Attendance: 391
Referee: Abigail Byrne (England)
