= 2023 Cup of Nations squads =

The 2023 Cup of Nations will be the second edition of the Cup of Nations, an international women's football tournament, consisting of a series of friendly games, that will be held in Australia from 16 to 22 February 2023. The four national teams involved in the tournament registered a squad of 23 players.

The age listed for each player is on 16 February 2023, the first day of the tournament. The numbers of caps and goals listed for each player do not include any matches played after the start of tournament. A flag is included for coaches that are of a different nationality than their own national team.

== Squads ==
=== Australia ===
Coach: (Sweden) Tony Gustavsson

The squad was announced on 2 February 2023.

No.	Pos.	Player	Date of birth (age)	Caps	Goals	Club
1	GK	Lydia Williams	13 May 1988 (aged 34)	102	0	(England) Brighton & Hove Albion
2	DF	Courtney Nevin	12 February 2002 (aged 21)	18	0	(England) Leicester City
3	DF	Aivi Luik	18 March 1985 (aged 37)	41	1	(Sweden) Häcken
4	DF	Clare Polkinghorne (captain)	1 February 1989 (aged 34)	151	14	(Sweden) Vittsjö
5	FW	Cortnee Vine	9 April 1998 (aged 24)	11	2	(Australia) Sydney FC
7	DF	Steph Catley	26 January 1994 (aged 29)	106	3	(England) Arsenal
8	MF	Elise Kellond-Knight	10 August 1990 (aged 32)	114	2	(Australia) Melbourne Victory
9	FW	Caitlin Foord	11 November 1994 (aged 28)	106	27	(England) Arsenal
10	MF	Emily van Egmond	12 July 1993 (aged 29)	124	30	(United States) San Diego Wave
11	FW	Mary Fowler	14 February 2003 (aged 20)	32	8	(England) Manchester City
12	GK	Teagan Micah	20 October 1997 (aged 25)	14	0	(Sweden) Rosengård
13	MF	Tameka Yallop	16 June 1991 (aged 31)	109	12	(Norway) Brann
14	DF	Alanna Kennedy	21 January 1995 (aged 28)	108	8	(England) Manchester City
15	FW	Emily Gielnik	13 May 1992 (aged 30)	57	11	(England) Aston Villa
16	FW	Hayley Raso	5 September 1994 (aged 28)	66	9	(England) Manchester City
18	GK	Mackenzie Arnold	25 February 1994 (aged 28)	29	0	(England) West Ham United
19	MF	Katrina Gorry	13 August 1992 (aged 30)	88	16	(Australia) Brisbane Roar
20	FW	Sam Kerr	10 September 1993 (aged 29)	116	61	(England) Chelsea
22	DF	Charlotte Grant	20 September 2001 (aged 21)	13	0	(Sweden) Vittsjö
23	MF	Kyra Cooney-Cross	15 February 2002 (aged 21)	22	0	(Sweden) Hammarby
24	FW	Larissa Crummer	10 January 1996 (aged 27)	30	4	(Australia) Brisbane Roar
26	MF	Clare Wheeler	14 January 1998 (aged 25)	11	0	(England) Everton
27	MF	Alex Chidiac	15 January 1999 (aged 24)	22	1	(Australia) Melbourne Victory
28	MF	Amy Sayer	30 November 2001 (aged 21)	6	0	(United States) Stanford Cardinal
29	DF	Clare Hunt	12 March 1999 (aged 23)	0	0	(Australia) Western Sydney Wanderers

=== Czech Republic ===
Coach: Karel Rada

The squad was announced on 30 January 2023.

No.	Pos.	Player	Date of birth (age)	Caps	Goals	Club
1	GK	Olivie Lukášová	4 June 2001 (aged 21)	8	0	(Czech Republic) Slavia Prague
2	DF	Anna Dlasková	6 October 1995 (aged 27)	28	2	(Czech Republic) Sparta Prague
3	DF	Aneta Dědinová	9 March 1994 (aged 28)	23	1	(Czech Republic) Sparta Prague
4	DF	Petra Bertholdová	24 November 1984 (aged 38)	112	4	(Czech Republic) Sparta Prague
5	DF	Gabriela Šlajsová	7 April 2000 (aged 22)	20	0	(Czech Republic) Slavia Prague
6	DF	Michaela Khýrová	3 February 2000 (aged 23)	11	3	(Czech Republic) Slavia Prague
7	FW	Lucie Martínková	19 September 1986 (aged 36)	122	26	(Czech Republic) Sparta Prague
8	MF	Aneta Pochmanová	12 April 2001 (aged 21)	12	0	(Czech Republic) Sparta Prague
9	FW	Andrea Stašková	12 May 2000 (aged 22)	34	13	(Spain) Atlético Madrid
10	MF	Kristýna Růžičková	5 November 2002 (aged 20)	0	0	(Czech Republic) Slavia Prague
11	MF	Barbora Polcarová	24 July 2002 (aged 20)	1	0	(Czech Republic) Sparta Prague
12	DF	Klára Cahynová	20 December 1993 (aged 29)	88	7	(Spain) Sevilla
13	MF	Jitka Chlastáková	13 October 1993 (aged 29)	55	6	(Australia) Western Sydney Wanderers
14	FW	Klára Cvrčková	25 July 2001 (aged 21)	7	1	(Czech Republic) Sparta Prague
15	MF	Antonie Stárová	12 October 1998 (aged 24)	23	1	(Czech Republic) Sparta Prague
16	GK	Barbora Růžičková	20 April 1998 (aged 24)	7	0	(Czech Republic) Slovácko
17	DF	Adéla Radová	16 February 1999 (aged 24)	1	0	(Czech Republic) Viktoria Plzeň
18	DF	Alena Pěčková	30 March 2001 (aged 21)	1	0	(Czech Republic) Slovácko
19	DF	Simona Necidová	20 January 1994 (aged 29)	40	2	(Czech Republic) Slavia Prague
20	MF	Denisa Veselá	8 January 1998 (aged 25)	12	0	(Czech Republic) Slavia Prague
21	FW	Miroslava Mrázová	19 February 1999 (aged 23)	16	2	(Czech Republic) Viktoria Plzeň
22	MF	Franny Černá	22 July 1997 (aged 25)	17	0	(Czech Republic) Slavia Prague
23	GK	Tereza Fuchsová	20 March 2003 (aged 19)	0	0	(Czech Republic) Slavia Prague

=== Jamaica ===
Coach: Lorne Donaldson

The squad was announced on 21 January 2023. On 4 February 2023, Khadija Shaw withdrew for personal reasons and was replaced by Shania Hayles. The following week, Hayles and Siobhan Wilson withdrew due to injury and were replaced by Kayla McCoy and Tiffany Cameron.

No.	Pos.	Player	Date of birth (age)	Club
1	GK	Sydney Schneider	31 August 1999 (aged 23)	(Czech Republic) Sparta Prague
2	DF	Satara Murray	1 July 1993 (aged 29)	(United States) Racing Louisville
3	DF	Vyan Sampson	2 July 1996 (aged 26)	(Scotland) Heart of Midlothian
4	DF	Chantelle Swaby	6 August 1998 (aged 24)	(France) Fleury
5	DF	Victoria Williams	5 April 1990 (aged 32)	(England) Brighton & Hove Albion
6	MF	Havana Solaun	23 February 1993 (aged 29)	(United States) Houston Dash
7	MF	Peyton McNamara	22 February 2002 (aged 20)	(United States) Ohio State Buckeyes
8	FW	Kayla McCoy	3 September 1996 (aged 26)	(Scotland) Rangers
9	MF	Drew Spence	23 October 1992 (aged 30)	(England) Tottenham Hotspur
10	FW	Jody Brown	16 April 2002 (aged 20)	(United States) Florida State Seminoles
11	FW	Kameron Simmonds	6 December 2003 (aged 19)	(United States) Tennessee Volunteers
12	FW	Cheyna Matthews	10 November 1993 (aged 29)	Unattached
13	GK	Rebecca Spencer	22 February 1991 (aged 31)	(England) Tottenham Hotspur
14	DF	Deneisha Blackwood	7 March 1997 (aged 25)	(France) Issy
15	FW	Tiffany Cameron	16 October 1991 (aged 31)	(Hungary) Győr
16	MF	Paige Bailey-Gayle	12 November 2001 (aged 21)	(England) Crystal Palace
17	DF	Allyson Swaby	3 October 1996 (aged 26)	(United States) Angel City
18	MF	Trudi Carter	18 November 1994 (aged 28)	Unattached
19	MF	Tiernny Wiltshire	8 May 1998 (aged 24)	Unattached
20	FW	Atlanta Primus	21 April 1997 (aged 25)	(England) London City Lionesses
21	FW	Kalyssa Van Zanten	25 August 2001 (aged 21)	(United States) Notre Dame Fighting Irish
22	FW	Solai Washington		(United States) Concorde Fire
23	GK	Liya Brooks	17 May 2005 (aged 17)	(United States) Hawaii Surf
24	MF	Rachel Jones	21 January 2000 (aged 23)	(United States) North Carolina Tar Heels

=== Spain ===
Coach: Jorge Vilda

The squad was announced on 6 February 2023. The following day, Bibiane Schulze withdrew due to a continuing groin injury and was replaced by Berta Pujadas.

No.	Pos.	Player	Date of birth (age)	Caps	Goals	Club
1	GK	Misa Rodríguez	23 July 1999 (aged 23)	9	0	(Spain) Real Madrid
2	DF	Oihane Hernández	4 May 2000 (aged 22)	6	0	(Spain) Athletic Bilbao
3	MF	Teresa Abelleira	9 January 2000 (aged 23)	10	0	(Spain) Real Madrid
4	DF	Rocío Gálvez	14 April 1997 (aged 25)	6	0	(Spain) Real Madrid
5	DF	Ivana Andrés	13 July 1994 (aged 28)	42	0	(Spain) Real Madrid
6	DF	Laia Codina	22 January 2000 (aged 23)	1	1	(Spain) Barcelona
7	MF	Irene Guerrero	12 December 1996 (aged 26)	18	4	(Spain) Atlético Madrid
8	MF	Maite Oroz	25 March 1998 (aged 24)	5	1	(Spain) Real Madrid
9	FW	Esther González	8 December 1992 (aged 30)	30	20	(Spain) Real Madrid
10	FW	Jennifer Hermoso	9 May 1990 (aged 32)	93	46	(Mexico) Pachuca
11	FW	Alba Redondo	27 August 1996 (aged 26)	21	9	(Spain) Levante
12	DF	Berta Pujadas	9 April 2000 (aged 22)	0	0	(Spain) Valencia
13	GK	Enith Salón	24 September 2001 (aged 21)	1	0	(Spain) Valencia
14	DF	María Méndez	10 April 2001 (aged 21)	1	0	(Spain) Levante
15	FW	Eva Navarro	27 January 2001 (aged 22)	5	2	(Spain) Atlético Madrid
16	MF	Fiamma Benítez	19 June 2004 (aged 18)	1	0	(Spain) Valencia
17	FW	Salma Paralluelo	13 November 2003 (aged 19)	2	3	(Spain) Barcelona
18	MF	Marta Cardona	26 May 1995 (aged 27)	26	3	(Spain) Atlético Madrid
19	DF	Olga Carmona	12 June 2000 (aged 22)	18	0	(Spain) Real Madrid
20	DF	Paula Tomás	11 September 2001 (aged 21)	0	0	(Spain) Levante
21	MF	Claudia Zornoza	29 October 1990 (aged 32)	8	0	(Spain) Real Madrid
22	FW	Athenea del Castillo	24 October 2000 (aged 22)	21	4	(Spain) Real Madrid
23	GK	Elene Lete	7 May 2002 (aged 20)	0	0	(Spain) Real Sociedad
24	MF	Sheila García	15 March 1997 (aged 25)	13	0	(Spain) Atlético Madrid
25	MF	Marta Carro	6 January 1991 (aged 32)	7	1	(Spain) Valencia

== Player representation ==
=== By club ===
Clubs with 3 or more players represented are listed.

Players	Club
9	(Czech Republic) Sparta Prague, (Spain) Real Madrid
8	(Czech Republic) Slavia Prague
5	(Spain) Atlético Madrid
4	(Spain) Valencia
3	(England) Manchester City, (Spain) Levante

=== By club nationality ===
Players	Clubs
26	Spain
21	Czech Republic
16	England
12	United States
7	Australia
5	Sweden
2	France, Scotland
1	Hungary, Mexico, Norway

=== By club federation ===
Players	Federation
74	UEFA
13	CONCACAF
7	AFC

=== By representatives of domestic league ===
National squad	Players
Spain	24
Czech Republic	20
Australia	6
Jamaica	0
