= 2025–26 Czech Women's First League =

Czech football season

Czech Women's First League
- Season: 2025–26
- Champions: Sparta Prague
- Promoted: Prague Raptors
- Relegated: FC Prague
- Champions League: Sparta Prague; Slavia Prague
- Europa Cup: Slovan Liberec
- Matches: 80
- Goals: 328 (4.1 per match)
- Top goalscorer: Denisa Rancová (17 Goals)
- Biggest home win: Slavia Prague 9–0 Viktoria Plzeň; Slavia Prague 9–0 Lokomotiva Brno
- Biggest away win: Lokomotiva Brno 0–7 Sparta Prague; FC Prague 0–7 Sparta Prague
- Highest scoring: Slavia Prague 9–0 Viktoria Plzeň; Slavia Prague 9–0 Lokomotiva Brno
- Longest winning run: 15; Sparta Prague
- Longest unbeaten run: 15; Sparta Prague
- Longest winless run: 15; FC Prague
- Longest losing run: 6 Baník Ostrava; FC Prague; Slovácko
- Highest attendance: 1,687; Slavia Prague 8–0 Baník Ostrava
- Lowest attendance: 43; Baník Ostrava 0–6 Slovan Liberec
- All statistics correct as of 24 May 2026.

The 2025–26 Czech Women's First League was the 33rd season of the Czech Republic's top-tier football league for women. Slavia Prague were the defending champions.

== Format ==
The eight teams played each other twice for a total of 14 matches per team. After that the top four teams played a championship round for another six matches per team. The bottom placed four teams played the relegation round. The champions and runners-up qualify for the 2026–27 UEFA Women's Champions League.

== Teams ==
Location of teams in 2025–26 Czech Women's First League

=== Team changes ===
| Promoted from 2024–25 Czech Women's Second League | Relegated from 2024–25 Czech Women's First League |
|---|---|
| Baník Ostrava | Pardubice |

=== Stadiums ===
| Team | Home town | Home ground |
|---|---|---|
| FC Prague | Prague | ABC Braník |
| Baník Ostrava | Ostrava | Bazaly |
| Lokomotiva Brno H. H. | Brno | Horní Heršpice |
| Slavia Prague | Prague | SK Horní Měcholupy |
| Slovan Liberec | Liberec | Hrádek nad Nisou |
| Slovácko | Uherské Hradiště | Městský stadion |
| Sparta Prague | Prague | Stadion SK Prosek |
| Viktoria Plzeň | Plzeň | Dobřany |

== Regular season ==
=== Standings ===
The regular season ended on 22 March 2026.

| Pos | Team | Pld | W | D | L | GF | GA | GD | Pts | Qualification or relegation |
|---|---|---|---|---|---|---|---|---|---|---|
| 1 | Sparta Prague | 14 | 14 | 0 | 0 | 64 | 5 | +59 | 42 | Qualification for championship group |
| 2 | Slavia Prague | 14 | 11 | 1 | 2 | 62 | 9 | +53 | 34 | Qualification for championship group |
| 3 | Slovácko | 14 | 9 | 2 | 3 | 32 | 13 | +19 | 29 | Qualification for championship group |
| 4 | Slovan Liberec | 14 | 8 | 1 | 5 | 39 | 21 | +18 | 25 | Qualification for championship group |
| 5 | Lokomotiva Brno H. H. | 14 | 3 | 2 | 9 | 8 | 40 | −32 | 11 | Qualification for relegation group |
| 6 | Viktoria Plzeň | 14 | 3 | 1 | 10 | 14 | 43 | −29 | 10 | Qualification for relegation group |
| 7 | Baník Ostrava | 14 | 3 | 1 | 10 | 10 | 45 | −35 | 10 | Qualification for relegation group |
| 8 | FC Prague | 14 | 0 | 2 | 12 | 9 | 62 | −53 | 2 | Qualification for relegation group |

Source: Soccerway
Rules for classification: 1) Points; 2) Goal difference; 3) Number of goals scored

=== Results ===
| Home \ Away | LOK | OST | PRA | SLA | SLO | SVK | SPA | VIK |
|---|---|---|---|---|---|---|---|---|
| Lokomotiva Brno H. H. | | 0–2 | 2–1 | 0–6 | 1–2 | 1–2 | 0–7 | 0–0 |
| Baník Ostrava | 0–1 | | 4–0 | 0–4 | 0–6 | 0–4 | 0–5 | 2–0 |
| FC Prague | 1–1 | 2–2 | | 0–4 | 1–2 | 0–5 | 0–7 | 2–5 |
| Slavia Prague | 9–0 | 8–0 | 6–0 | | 3–1 | 4–0 | 1–2 | 9–0 |
| Slovan Liberec | 4–1 | 5–0 | 8–0 | 1–2 | | 1–1 | 0–5 | 4–1 |
| Slovácko | 1–0 | 3–0 | 6–1 | 1–1 | 2–1 | | 0–2 | 4–0 |
| Sparta Prague | 5–0 | 4–0 | 7–0 | 4–1 | 4–1 | 2–0 | | 7–1 |
| Viktoria Plzeň | 0–1 | 3–0 | 3–1 | 0–4 | 0–3 | 0–3 | 1–3 | |

Legend: Blue = home team win; Yellow = draw; Red = away team win.

== Final stage ==
=== Championship group ===
Played by the teams placed first to fourth of the regular season. Teams play each other twice.

| Pos | Team | Pld | W | D | L | GF | GA | GD | Pts | Qualification or relegation | SPA | SLA | SLO | SVK |
|---|---|---|---|---|---|---|---|---|---|---|---|---|---|---|
| 1 | Sparta Prague (C, Q) | 6 | 5 | 0 | 1 | 18 | 4 | +14 | 57 | Qualification to Champions League second qualifying round | | 0–2 | 7–0 | 4–1 |
| 2 | Slavia Prague (Q) | 6 | 5 | 0 | 1 | 18 | 4 | +14 | 49 | Qualification to Champions League second qualifying round | 0–2 | | 3–0 | 3–1 |
| 3 | Slovan Liberec | 6 | 2 | 0 | 4 | 6 | 18 | −12 | 31 | Qualification for Europa Cup first qualifying round | 0–1 | 0–4 | | 2–1 |
| 4 | Slovácko | 6 | 0 | 0 | 6 | 7 | 23 | −16 | 29 | | 1–4 | 1–6 | 2–4 | |

Source: Soccerway
Legend: Blue = home team win; Yellow = draw; Red = away team win.
Rules for classification: 1) Points; 2) Goal difference; 3) Number of goals scored
(C) Champions; (Q) Qualified for the phase indicated

=== Relegation group ===
Played by the teams placed fifth to eighth of the regular season. Teams play each other twice.

| Pos | Team | Pld | W | D | L | GF | GA | GD | Pts | Qualification or relegation | OST | LOK | VIK | PRA |
|---|---|---|---|---|---|---|---|---|---|---|---|---|---|---|
| 1 | Baník Ostrava | 6 | 4 | 1 | 1 | 16 | 9 | +7 | 23 | | | 1–0 | 1–1 | 3–2 |
| 2 | Lokomotiva Brno H. H. | 6 | 4 | 0 | 2 | 9 | 7 | +2 | 23 | | 0–4 | | 3–1 | 1–0 |
| 3 | Viktoria Plzeň | 6 | 2 | 1 | 3 | 7 | 13 | −6 | 17 | | 1–5 | 0–3 | | 2–1 |
| 4 | FC Prague (R) | 6 | 1 | 0 | 5 | 9 | 12 | −3 | 5 | Relegation to 2026–27 II.league | 5–2 | 1–2 | 0–2 | |

Source: Soccerway
Legend: Blue = home team win; Yellow = draw; Red = away team win.
Rules for classification: 1) Points; 2) Goal difference; 3) Number of goals scored
(R) Relegated

== Managerial changes ==
Ahead of the season:

| Team | Outgoing manager | Manner of departure | Date of vacancy | Replaced by | Date of appointment | Contract valid until |
|---|---|---|---|---|---|---|
| Sparta Prague | (Slovakia) Pavol Gregora | Sacked | 9 June 2025 | (Austria) Michael Steiner | 30 June 2025 | Undisclosed |

During the season:

| Team | Outgoing manager | Manner of departure | Date of vacancy | Match-week | Position in table | Replaced by | Date of appointment | Contract valid until |
|---|---|---|---|---|---|---|---|---|
| Viktoria Plzeň | (Czech Republic) Pavel Vacek | Personal reasons | 3 October 2025 | 6 | 5th | (Czech Republic) Pavel Hudeček | 3 October 2025 | Undisclosed |
| Slavia Prague | (Czech Republic) Jiří Vágner | Mutual consent | 11 December 2025 | 10 | 2nd | (Czech Republic) Filip Klapka | 15 January 2026 | Undisclosed |
| Slovácko | (Czech Republic) Michaela Daněčková | Mutual consent | 5 February 2026 | 10 | 3rd | (Czech Republic) Petr Posolda | 5 February 2026 | Undisclosed |
| Viktoria Plzeň | (Czech Republic) Pavel Hudeček | Undisclosed | Undisclosed | 10 | 7th | (Czech Republic) Ondřej Lokaj | 6 February 2026 | Undisclosed |

== Personnel and kits ==
Note: Flags indicate national team as has been defined under FIFA eligibility rules. Players may hold more than one non-FIFA nationality.

| Team | Manager | Captain | Kit manufacturer | Shirt sponsor |
|---|---|---|---|---|
| Slovan Liberec | (Czech Republic) Jiří Kaiser | (Czech Republic) Denisa Tenkrátová | Nike | PREGIS |
| Baník Ostrava | (Czech Republic) Petr Kundrt | (Czech Republic) Eliška Janíková | Macron | M&M reality |
| Slavia Prague | (Czech Republic) Filip Klapka | (Slovakia) Diana Bartovičová | Castore | eToro |
| Slovácko | (Czech Republic) Petr Posolda | (Czech Republic) Lucie Jelínková | Puma | Tipsport |
| Sparta Prague | (Austria) Michael Steiner | (Czech Republic) Eva Bartoňová | Adidas | Betano |
| Viktoria Plzeň | (Czech Republic) Ondřej Lokaj | (Czech Republic) Miroslava Mrázová | Macron | Tipsport |
| Lokomotiva Brno Horní Heršpice | (Czech Republic) Zdeněk Matoušek | (Czech Republic) Tereza Ruslerová | Kappa | EXCLUSIA |
| FC Prague | (Czech Republic) Jan Trousil | (Czech Republic) Klára Zemjánková | Nike | — |

== Season statistics ==
=== Top scorers ===
Final standing

| Rank | Player | Club | Goals |
|---|---|---|---|
| 1 | (Czech Republic) Denisa Rancová | Sparta Prague | 17 |
| 2 | (Slovakia) Martina Šurnovská | Slavia Prague | 15 |
| 3 | (United States) Hallie Bergford | Sparta Prague | 12 |
| 4 | (Czech Republic) Michaela Khýrová | Sparta Prague | 11 |
| 4 | (Czech Republic) Klára Cvrčková | Slavia Prague | 11 |
| 4 | (Czech Republic) Kamila Dubcová | Slavia Prague | 11 |
| 5 | (United States) Elizabeth Ospeck | Sparta Prague | 10 |
| 6 | (Czech Republic) Denisa Skálová | Slovan Liberec | 8 |
| 6 | (Czech Republic) Nela Řehová | Baník Ostrava | 8 |
| 7 | (Czech Republic) Petra Divišová | Slavia Prague / FC Prague | 6 |
| 7 | (United States) Sydnie Thibodaux | Slovácko | 6 |

=== Clean sheets ===
Final standing

| Rank | Player | Club | Clean sheets |
|---|---|---|---|
| 1 | (Netherlands) Lisan Alkemade | Sparta Prague | 6 |
| 1 | (Czech Republic) Nikola Harantová | Sparta Prague | 6 |
| 2 | (Czech Republic) Vanesa Jílková | Slavia Prague | 5 |
| 3 | (Czech Republic) Barbora Votíková | Slavia Prague | 4 |
| 3 | (Slovakia) Sofia Valenčinová | Lokomotiva Brno H. H. | 4 |
| 3 | (Czech Republic) Anežka Zelenková | Slovácko | 4 |
| 3 | (Czech Republic) Alexandra Kroupová | Slovan Liberec | 4 |
| 3 | (Czech Republic) Barbora Růžičková | Baník Ostrava | 4 |
| 4 | (Czech Republic) Michaela Radová | Viktoria Plzeň | 3 |
| 5 | (Czech Republic) Adéla Fraňková | Slovácko | 2 |
