= 2017–18 Czech Women's First League =

Czech Women's First League
- Season: 2017–18
- Champions: Sparta Prague
- Promoted: -
- Relegated: -
- Champions League: Sparta Prague; Slavia Prague
- Matches: 68
- Goals: 320 (4.71 per match)
- Top goalscorer: Kateřina Svitková (24)
- Biggest home win: Slavia Prague 13–0 Hradec Králové
- Biggest away win: Slovan Liberec 1–11 Slavia Prague; Lokomotiva Brno H. H. 0–10 Slavia Prague
- Highest scoring: Slavia Prague 13–0 Hradec Králové
- Longest winning run: 13 matches Slavia Prague
- Longest unbeaten run: 15 matches Slavia Prague
- Longest winless run: 5 matches Lokomotiva Brno H. H.
- Longest losing run: 4 matches Hradec Králové
- Highest attendance: 600; Slavia Prague 1–2 Sparta Prague
- Lowest attendance: 20; Dukla Prague 0–2 Slovácko
- Average attendance: 80
- All statistics correct as of 28 June 2018.

The 2017–18 Czech Women's First League was the 25th season of the Czech Republic's top-tier football league for women. Slavia Prague were the defending champions.

== Format ==
The eight teams will play each other twice for a total of 14 matches per team. After that, the top four teams will play a championship round for another six matches per team. The bottom placed four teams play the relegation round. The champion and runner-up qualify for the 2018–19 UEFA Women's Champions League.

== Teams ==
Team	Home town	Home ground
Hradec Králové	Hradec Králové	Nový Hradec Králové
Dukla Prague	Prague	SK Prosek
Lokomotiva Brno H. H.	Brno	Horní Heršpice
Slavia Prague	Prague	Stadion SC Xaverov
Slovan Liberec	Liberec	Frýdlant v Čechách
Slovácko	Uherské Hradiště	Sportovní areál Širůch
Sparta Prague	Prague	Strahov Stadium
Viktoria Plzeň	Plzeň	SK Smíchov Plzeň

=== Stadia and locations ===
Location of teams in 2017–18 Czech Women's First League

== Regular season ==
=== Standings ===
The regular season ended on 14 April 2018.

Pos	Team	Pld	W	D	L	GF	GA	GD	Pts	Qualification or relegation
1	Slavia Prague	14	13	1	0	102	11	+91	40	Qualification for championship group
2	Sparta Prague	14	11	2	1	65	6	+59	35	Qualification for championship group
3	Slovácko	14	10	1	3	43	16	+27	31	Qualification for championship group
4	Viktoria Plzeň	14	4	1	9	18	41	−23	13	Qualification for championship group
5	Lokomotiva Brno H. H.	14	3	3	8	18	53	−35	12	Qualification for relegation group
6	Slovan Liberec	14	2	4	8	12	43	−31	10	Qualification for relegation group
7	Hradec Králové	14	2	3	9	13	54	−41	9	Qualification for relegation group
8	Dukla Prague	14	2	3	9	8	55	−47	9	Qualification for relegation group

Source: Soccerway
Rules for classification: 1) Points; 2) Goal difference; 3) Number of goals scored

=== Results ===
Home \ Away	LOK	DUK	HRA	SLA	SLO	SVK	SPA	VIK
Lokomotiva Brno H. H.		1–1	3–2	0–10	2–2	2–3	0–7	0–2
Dukla Prague	3–1		2–2	0–9	0–3	0–2	0–4	1–0
Hradec Králové	1–1	2–0		1–9	1–2	0–3	0–8	1–4
Slavia Prague	11–1	10–0	13–0		5–0	2–1	3–2	8–1
Slovan Liberec	1–3	0–0	1–1	1–11		1–6	0–2	0–2
Slovácko	6–1	6–0	3–0	2–4	3–0		0–3	1–0
Sparta Prague	4–0	10–0	4–0	2–2	6–0	1–1		4–0
Viktoria Plzeň	0–3	5–1	1–2	0–5	1–1	2–6	0–8	

Source: Soccerway
Legend: Blue = home team win; Yellow = draw; Red = away team win.

== Final stage ==
=== Championship group ===
Played by the teams placed first to fourth of the regular season. Teams play each other twice.

Pos	Team	Pld	W	D	L	GF	GA	GD	Pts	Qualification or relegation	SPA	SLA	SVK	VIK
1	Sparta Prague (C)	6	6	0	0	88	8	+80	53	Qualification to Champions League		3–0	4–1	6–0
2	Slavia Prague	6	4	0	2	126	22	+104	52	Qualification to Champions League	1–2		6–3	4–0
3	Slovácko	6	1	0	5	51	42	+9	34		0–6	1–6		0–2
4	Viktoria Plzeň	6	1	0	5	24	64	−40	16		0–2	2–7	2–3	

Source: Soccerway
Legend: Blue = home team win; Yellow = draw; Red = away team win.
Rules for classification: 1) Points; 2) Goal difference; 3) Number of goals scored
(C) Champions

=== Relegation group ===
Played by the teams placed fifth to eighth in the regular season. Teams play each other twice.

Pos	Team	Pld	W	D	L	GF	GA	GD	Pts	SLO	DUK	HRA	LOK
1	Slovan Liberec	6	5	1	0	34	49	−15	26		6–0	1–0	4–1
2	Dukla Prague	6	3	0	3	18	71	−53	18	1–5		1–2	4–1
3	Hradec Králové	6	2	2	2	22	63	−41	17	3–3	2–3		0–0
4	Lokomotiva Brno H. H.	6	0	1	5	22	67	−45	13	1–3	0–1	1–2	

Source: Soccerway
Legend: Blue = home team win; Yellow = draw; Red = away team win.
Rules for classification: 1) Points; 2) Goal difference; 3) Number of goals scored

== Personnel and kits ==
Note: Flags indicate national team as has been defined under FIFA eligibility rules. Players may hold more than one non-FIFA nationality.

Team	Manager	Captain	Kit manufacturer	Shirt sponsor
Slovan Liberec	(Czech Republic) Josef Lexa	(Czech Republic) Veronika Tůmová	Nike	Preciosa
Dukla Praha	(Czech Republic) Ondřej Havlas	(Czech Republic) Veronika Kozlíková	Adidas	Carbounion Bohemia
Slavia Praha	(Czech Republic) Pavel Medynský	(Czech Republic) Blanka Pěničková	Umbro	CEFC China
Slovácko	(Czech Republic) Petr Vlachovský	(Czech Republic) Kristýna Janků	Nike	Z-Group
Sparta Praha	(Slovakia) Peter Bartalský	(Czech Republic) Adéla Odehnalová	Nike	PCI für Bau-Profis
Viktoria Plzeň	(Czech Republic) Karel Rada	(Czech Republic) Adéla Ondrášková	Alea	Doosan Group
Lokomotiva Brno Horní Heršpice	(Czech Republic) Rostislav Horáček	(Czech Republic) Žaneta Holcmannová	Adidas	—
Hradec Králové	(Czech Republic) Petr Rejman	(Czech Republic) Pavla Novotná	Nike	—

== Top goalscorers ==
Final standing

Rank	Scorer	Club	Goals
1	(Czech Republic) Kateřina Svitková	Slavia Prague	24
2	(Czech Republic) Tereza Kožárová	Slavia Praha	18
3	(Czech Republic) Andrea Stašková	Sparta Prague	14
4	(Czech Republic) Petra Divišová	Slavia Praha	12
4	(Czech Republic) Andrea Jarchovská	Slavia Praha	12
4	(Slovakia) Klaudia Fabová	Slovácko	12
5	(Czech Republic) Pavlína Nepokojová	Sparta Praha	11
5	(Mexico) Christina Burkenroad	Sparta Praha	11
5	(Czech Republic) Michaela Dubcová	Slovácko	11
