= Antonie Stárová =

Czech footballer (born 1998)

Personal information
- Date of birth: 12 October 1998 (age 28)
- Place of birth: Prague, Czech Republic
- Height: 1.72 m (5 ft 8 in)
- Positions: Midfielder; defender

Team information
- Current team: Sparta Prague
- Number: 7

Youth career
- Přední Kopanina
- Sparta Prague

College career
Years	Team	Apps	(Gls)
2018	Delaware Fightin' Blue Hens	8	(1)
2019–2022	NC State Wolfpack	46	(3)

Senior career*
Years	Team	Apps	(Gls)
2016–2018	Sparta Prague		
2022–2023	Sparta Prague		
2023–2024	Guingamp	22	(4)
2024–	Sparta Prague		

International career^{‡}
2016–	Czech Republic	28	(1)
- * Club domestic league appearances and goals as of 26 September 2023 ‡ National team caps and goals as of 26 September 2023

Antonie Stárová (born 12 October 1998) is a Czech footballer who plays as a midfielder for Sparta Prague and has appeared for the Czech Republic women's national team.

== Career ==
Stárová has been capped for the Czech Republic national team, appearing for the team during the 2019 FIFA Women's World Cup qualifying cycle.

On 20 July 2024, Stárová signed a contract with Sparta Prague. On 27 April 2026, Stárová signed a new contract with Sparta Prague.

== Personal life ==
As of 14 September 2023, Stárová has a girlfriend.

== Honours ==
Sparta Prague

- Czech Women's First League: 2017–18, 2025–26
- Czech Women's Cup: 2017, 2018, 2026
