= Kylie Nadaner =

American soccer player (born 1992)

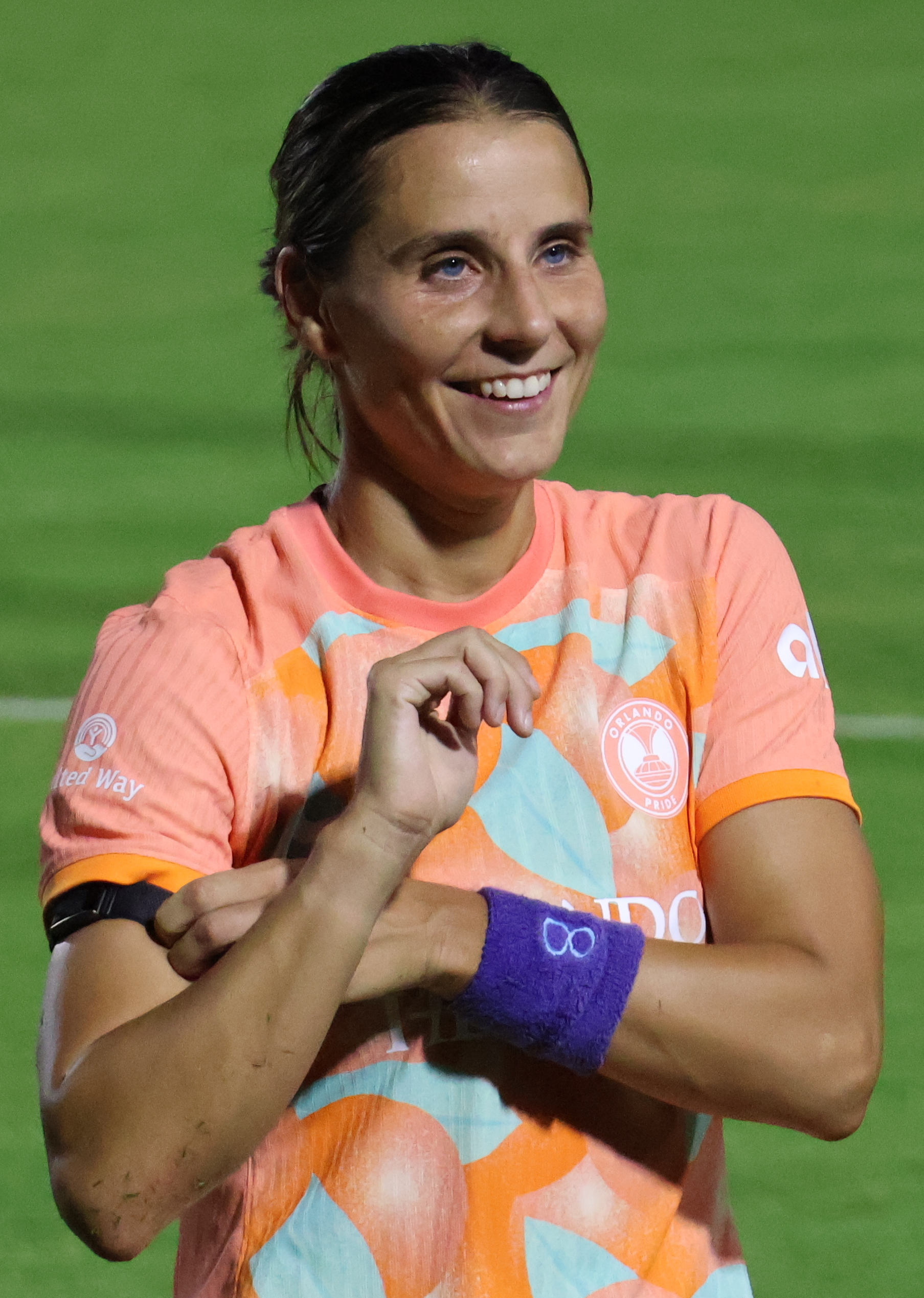
- Strom with the Orlando Pride in 2024

Personal information
- Birth name: Kylie Allyssa Strom
- Date of birth: March 18, 1992 (age 34)
- Place of birth: Endicott, New York
- Height: 5 ft 8 in (1.73 m)
- Position: Center back

Team information
- Current team: Orlando Pride
- Number: 3

Youth career
- Syracuse Surge Fury

College career
Years	Team	Apps	(Gls)
2010–2013	Boston University Terriers	86	(14)

Senior career*
Years	Team	Apps	(Gls)
2015	1. FFC Frankfurt II		
2016–2017	Boston Breakers	7	(0)
2017–2019	Sparta Prague	36	(19)
2019–2021	Atlético Madrid	33	(1)
2021–	Orlando Pride	91	(2)
- * Club domestic league appearances and goals as of 04:16, November 2, 2025 (UTC)

Kylie Allyssa Nadaner (née Strom; born March 18, 1992) is an American soccer player who plays as a center back for the Orlando Pride of the National Women's Soccer League (NWSL).

Nadaner played college soccer for Boston University from 2010 to 2013. She has previously played for the Boston Breakers in the NWSL, Sparta Prague in the Czech Republic, and Atlético Madrid in Spain. In 2021, she signed with the Pride, which she helped lead to the NWSL Shield and NWSL Championship in 2024.

== Early life ==
A native of Endicott, New York, Nadaner was born on March 18, 1992, to Richard and Roxanne Strom, and has one sibling, Corey. She played soccer at Union-Endicott High School and was named NY State Class AA Player of the Year and an NSCAA All-American as the team won two NY West State Cup titles. She also competed in track and field, qualifying for the state championship in the 400 meters during her sophomore and junior years. She played youth club soccer for Syracuse Surge Fury.

=== College ===
Nadaner played four years of collegiate soccer for Boston University from 2010 to 2013. As a rookie she played in all 22 games including five starts as BU won both the America East regular season and tournament. She led the conference with nine assists including tying a single-game school record with three assists against Vermont on October 10, 2010, and finished the year with America East All-Rookie Team and AE All-Championship Team honors. As a sophomore in 2011, Nadaner started all 23 games and was named to the America East All-Conference First Team. Ahead of her senior season in 2013, Nadaner was named team captain. She started all 23 games and earned All-Patriot League First Team and Patriot League All-Tournament Team honors. Nadaner made a total of 86 appearances, scoring 14 goals and 17 assists.

== Club career ==
=== FFC Frankfurt II, 2015 ===
Nadaner declared for the 2014 NWSL College Draft but was not selected. She joined the FFC Frankfurt II reserve team during the 2014–15 2. Bundesliga.

=== Boston Breakers, 2016–2017 ===
Nadaner returned to the United States after a season in Germany and joined the Boston Breakers Reserves having previously played on the Breakers' college academy team during her time at BU. On July 15, 2016, she was called up to the first team as an amateur national team replacement player and made her Breakers debut two days later as a 61st-minute substitute in a 3–2 defeat to Sky Blue FC. She was signed to a professional contract on August 29, 2016, and finished the season with seven appearances including three starts. Nadaner did not make any appearances in the 2017 season before being released on June 30, 2017, in order to clear a roster spot for Katie Stengel.

=== Sparta Prague, 2017–2019 ===
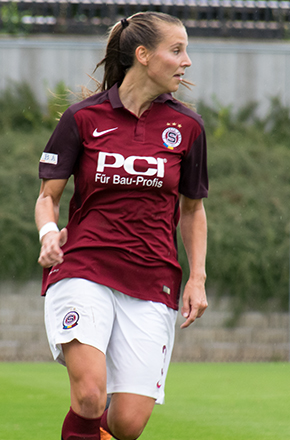
Nadaner with Sparta Prague in 2017

In August 2017, Nadaner signed a professional contract with Czech Women's First League team Sparta Prague. In her first season with the team, she helped Sparta win their first league title in five years. Sparta also won their ninth Czech Women's Cup, beating Slovácko 3–1 in the final in which Nadaner was named Most Valuable Player. She was also named as the 2017–18 Czech Women's First League player of the season and club player of the season.

In May 2018, Nadaner signed a one-year extension ahead of the 2018–19 season. The team defended both the league and cup as Nadaner was voted as Sparta's player of the season for the second consecutive season. During the 2019 cup final, Nadaner scored Sparta's only goal in a 1–1 draw with rivals Slavia Prague but failed to convert her penalty in the ensuing penalty shoot-out. In June 2019, she signed another one-year contract with Sparta Prague.

=== Atlético Madrid, 2019–2021 ===
In August 2019, Nadaner was bought from Sparta Prague by Spanish Primera División side Atlético Madrid for an undisclosed fee. She scored her first goal for the club on September 26, 2019, during the second leg of the 2019–20 UEFA Women's Champions league round of 32. With Atlético trailing the game 1–0 to Serbian side Spartak Subotica, Nadaner scored an equalizer in the 83rd-minute to send Atlético through 4–3 on aggregate. After two seasons, Nadaner left upon the expiry of her contract.

=== Orlando Pride, 2021–present ===
On July 5, 2021, Nadaner signed a two-year contract with Orlando Pride. In June 2023, Nadaner was named to NWSL Best XI of the Month, for the month of May. On December 7, 2023, Nadaner signed a three-year contract with Orlando Pride.

As vice captain of the Pride, Nadaner made 25 appearances (24 starts) in the 2024 regular season as the team claimed the NWSL Shield with the best record in the league. Her partnership with Emily Sams helped set an NWSL record with 13 shutouts in the season; both center backs were among the five players nominated for NWSL Defender of the Year, and Sams won the award. Nadaner played every minute of the playoffs as the Pride won their first NWSL Championship with a 1–0 victory over the Washington Spirit.

On June 13, 2025, Nadaner played in her 100th match for the Pride.

== International ==
In June 2014, Nadaner was called in to the 26-player United States under-23 training camp, the second Boston University player to receive an invitation to a National Team camp after Deidre Enos in 2011.

== Personal life ==
In September 2020, Nadaner joined Common Goal, a charity that pledges one percent of members' salaries to a collective fund that supports soccer charities around the world.

She is married to Evin Nadaner and began using her married name in 2025.

Kylie and her husband Evin Nadaner announced in December 2025 that they are expecting their first child in May 2026.

== Career statistics ==
=== Club ===
As of March 14, 2025

Club	Season	League			Cup (Note: Pohár KFŽ, Copa de la Reina and NWSL Challenge Cup)		Playoffs (Note: Includes NWSL playoffs)		Continental (Note: UEFA Women's Champions League)		Other		Total	
Club	Season	Division	Apps	Goals	Apps	Goals	Apps	Goals	Apps	Goals	Apps	Goals	Apps	Goals
Boston Breakers	2016	NWSL	7	0	—		—		—		—		7	0
Boston Breakers	2017	NWSL	0	0	—		—		—		—		0	0
Boston Breakers	Total		7	0	0	0	0	0	0	0	0	0	7	0
Sparta Prague	2017–18	I. liga žen	18	5	1	0	—		3	1	—		22	6
Sparta Prague	2018–19	I. liga žen	18	14	3	2	—		2	0	—		23	16
Sparta Prague	Total		36	19	4	2	0	0	5	1	0	0	45	22
Atlético Madrid	2019–20	Primera División	8	0	0	0	—		2	1	1 (Note: 2019–20 Supercopa de España)	0	11	1
Atlético Madrid	2020–21	Primera División	25	1	2	0	—		2	0	0	0	29	1
Atlético Madrid	Total		33	1	2	0	0	0	4	1	1	0	40	2
Orlando Pride	2021	NWSL	9	0	0	0	—		—		—		9	0
Orlando Pride	2022	NWSL	18	1	5	0	—		—		—		23	1
Orlando Pride	2023	NWSL	22	1	4	0	—		—		—		26	1
Orlando Pride	2024	NWSL	25	0	—		3	0	—		3 (Note: NWSL x Liga MX Femenil Summer Cup)	0	31	0
Orlando Pride	2025	NWSL	17	0	1	0	—		—		—		18	0
Orlando Pride	Total		91	2	10	0	3	0	0	0	3	0	107	2
Career total			167	22	16	2	3	0	9	2	4	0	199	26

== Honors ==
Boston University Terriers

- America East regular season: 2010, 2011, 2012
- America East Tournament: 2010, 2011
- Patriot League Tournament: 2013

Sparta Prague

- Czech Women's First League: 2017–18, 2018–19
- Czech Women's Cup: 2018, 2019

Atlético Madrid

- Supercopa de España: 2020–21

Orlando Pride

- NWSL Shield: 2024
- NWSL Championship: 2024

Individual

- Czech Women's First League Player of the Year: 2017–18
- NWSL 100 CAPS 2025
