= Markéta Ringelová =

Czech footballer

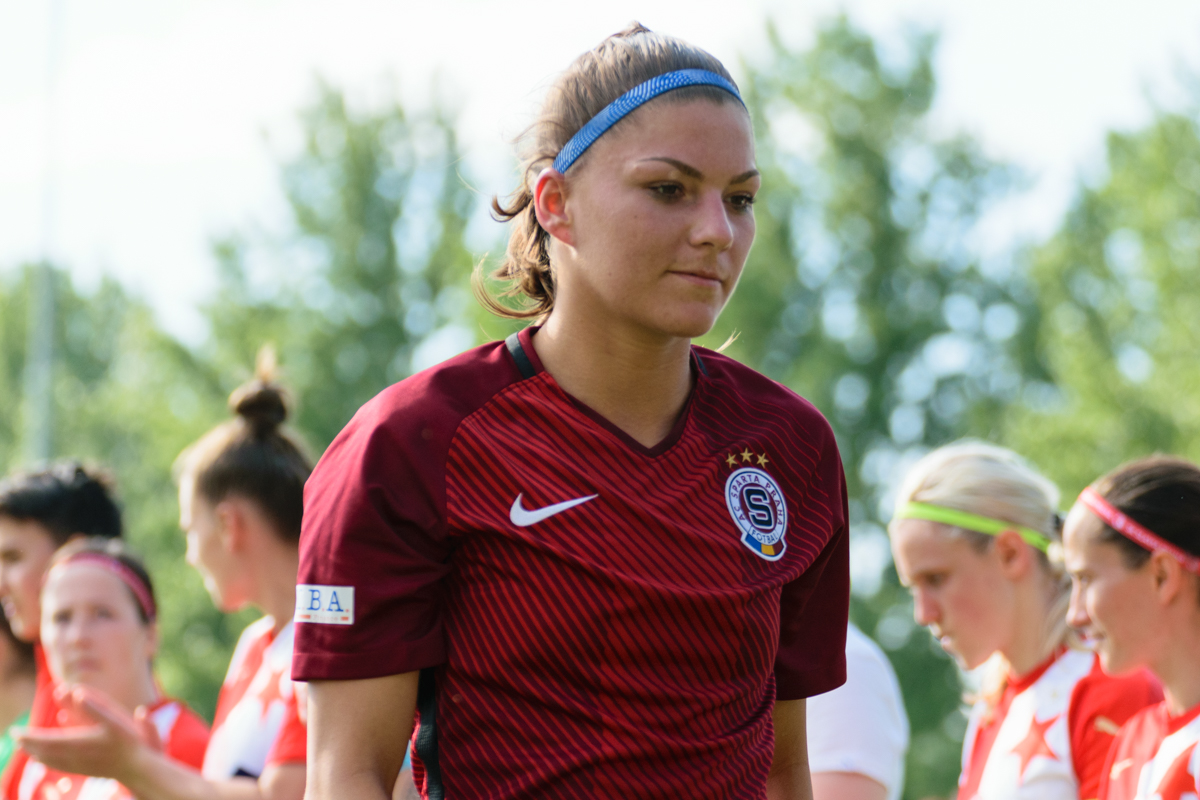
- Ringelová in 2019

Personal information
- Date of birth: 25 July 1989 (age 37)
- Place of birth: Hradec Králové, Czechoslovakia
- Height: 1.66 m (5 ft 5 in)
- Positions: Midfielder; forward

Team information
- Current team: Prague Raptors
- Number: 16

Youth career
- Hradec Králové

Senior career*
Years	Team	Apps	(Gls)
- Hradec Králové
2007–2022	Sparta Prague		
2022	Altenmarkt	10	(0)
2023	Hradec Králové		
2023–2025	Sparta Prague		
2024–2025	→ Sparta Prague B		
2025–	Prague Raptors		

International career^{‡}
2007–	Czech Republic	41	(3)
- * Club domestic league appearances and goals ‡ National team caps and goals as of 15 July 2022

Markéta Ringelová (born 25 July 1989) is a Czech footballer who plays for Prague Raptors in the Czech Women's Second League.

In February 2023 Ringelová joined Czech Women's Second League club Hradec Králové.

On 25 July 2023, Ringelová signed a contract with Sparta Prague.

On 15 August 2025, Ringelová left Sparta Prague and joined Czech Women's Second League club Prague Raptors.

She is a member of the Czech national team. Ringelová received her first call-up to the senior team in August 2007. She made her debut for the national team on 26 August 2007 in a match against Belarus.

== Personal life ==
Growing up, Ringelová attended the Sportovní gymnázium (sports gymnasium) in Pardubice. In 2008, she was among a number of alumni awarded recognition by the school.

Ringelová is dating football referee Lucie Ratajová.
