= Petra Vyštejnová =

Czech footballer (born 1990)

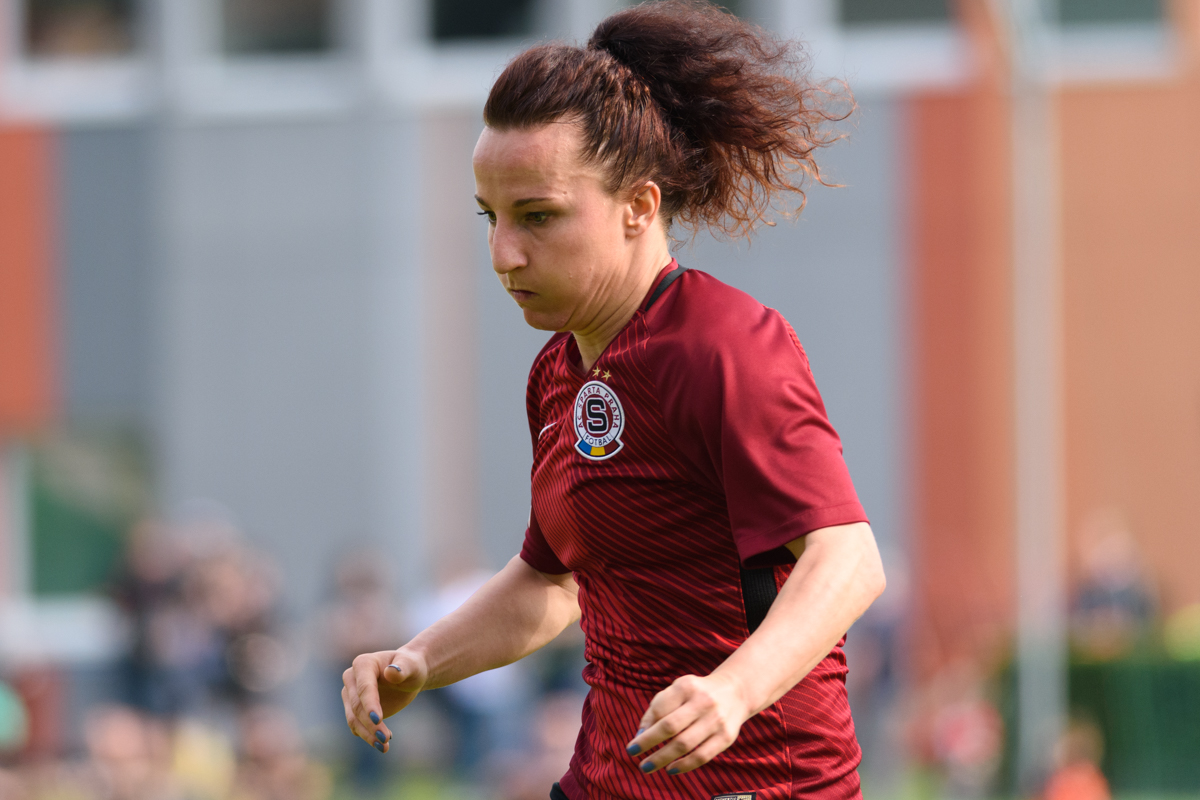
- Vyštejnová in 2019

Personal information
- Full name: Petra Vyštejnová
- Date of birth: 12 November 1990 (age 35)
- Place of birth: Prague, Czechoslovakia
- Height: 1.57 m (5 ft 2 in)
- Position: Defender

Youth career
- Sparta Prague

Senior career*
Years	Team	Apps	(Gls)
2008–2023	Sparta Prague		

International career^{‡}
2008–2021	Czech Republic	82	(0)
- * Club domestic league appearances and goals ‡ National team caps and goals as of 27 August 2025

Petra Vyštejnová (born 12 November 1990) is a Czech former football defender, who played for Sparta Prague in the Czech Women's First League.

She was a member of the Czech national team. Vyštejnová made her debut for the national team in a match against Italy on 25 October 2008.
