= Michaela Čulová =

Czech footballer

Personal information
- Date of birth: 14 February 1991 (age 35)
- Place of birth: Želenice, Czechoslovakia
- Height: 1.83 m (6 ft 0 in)
- Position: Defender

Youth career
- 2000–2004: Bílina
- 2004–2007: Teplice

Senior career*
Years	Team	Apps	(Gls)
2007–2012	Sparta Prague		
2012–2013	→ Bohemians Prague (loan)		
2013–2014	SV Neulengbach		
2014–2016	Sparta Prague	3	(0)

International career^{‡}
2011–2016	Czech Republic	4	(0)
- * Club domestic league appearances and goals ‡ National team caps and goals as of 6 November 2016

Michaela Čulová is a retired Czech football defender.

She was a member of the Czech national team. She made her debut for the national team on 3 June 2011 in a match against Nigeria.

== Career honours ==
=== Club ===
SV Neulengbach

- ÖFB-Frauenliga (1): 2013–14

Bohemians Prague

- Czech Second Division (1): 2012–13

Sparta Prague

- Czech First Division (5): 2007–08, 2008–09 Czech 2009–10, 2010–11, 2011–12
- Czech Women's Cup (6): 2007–08, 2008–09, 2009–10, 2010–11, 2011–12, 2014–15

FK Teplice

- Czech Second Division (1): 2004-05
