= Franny Černá =

Czech footballer (born 1997)

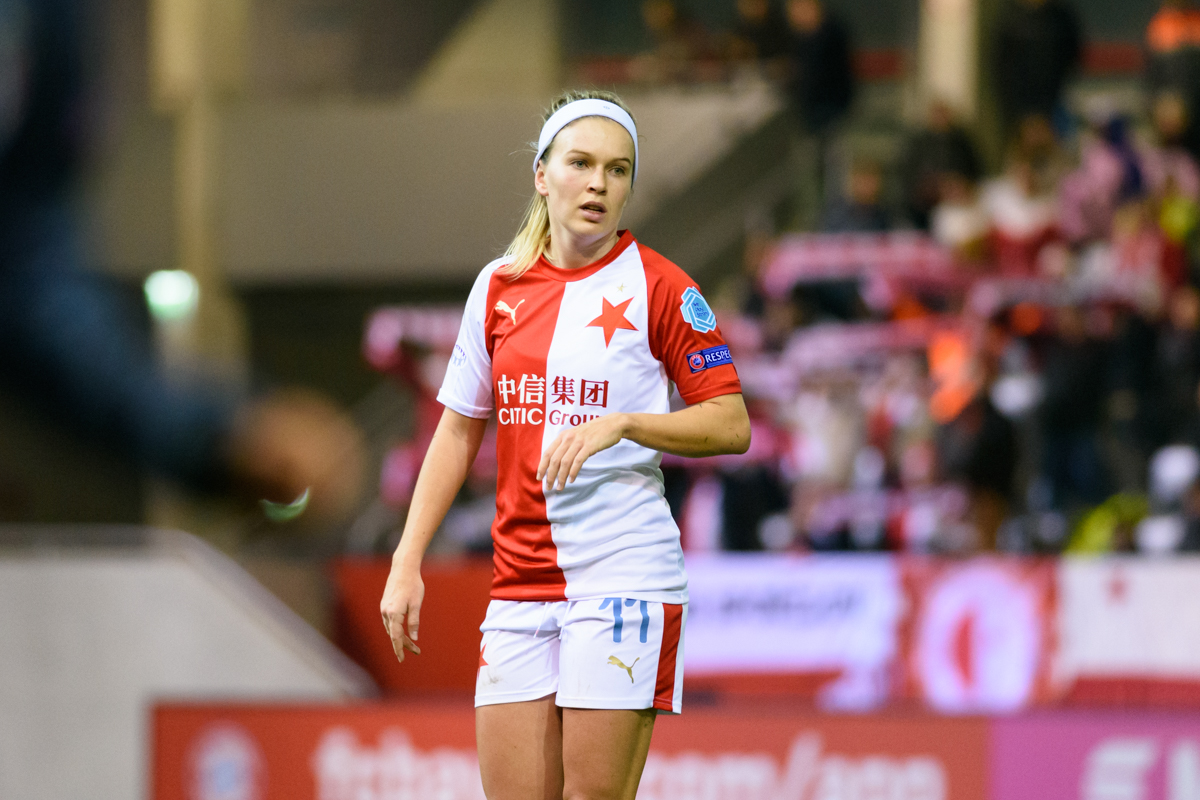
- Černá with Slavia Prague in 2019

Personal information
- Date of birth: 22 July 1997 (age 29)
- Place of birth: Berkeley, California, United States
- Height: 1.65 m (5 ft 5 in)
- Position: Midfielder

Team information
- Current team: Sparta Prague
- Number: 22

Youth career
- East Bay United Oakland

College career
Years	Team	Apps	(Gls)
2015–2018	DePaul Blue Demons	77	(33)

Senior career*
Years	Team	Apps	(Gls)
2019–2024	Slavia Prague	97	(37)
2024–	Sparta Prague	48	(18)

International career^{‡}
2014–2015	Czech Republic U19	11	(4)
2020–	Czech Republic	58	(5)
- * Club domestic league appearances and goals as of 7 November 2026 ‡ National team caps and goals as of 13 October 2026

Franny Černá (born 22 July 1997), also known as Franny Cerny, is a Czech professional footballer who plays as a midfielder for Czech Women's First League club Sparta Prague and the Czech Republic national team.

== Early life ==
Černá was born and raised in Berkeley, California. Her parents migrated from Czechoslovakia to the United States before the Velvet Revolution.

== College career ==
Černá attended the DePaul University in Chicago, where she played for the DePaul Blue Demons from 2015 to 2018 and received her bachelor's degree in Health Sciences with a focus on biology. She scored 33 goals and provided 16 assists from 77 matches during her college career.

== Club career ==
On 19 February 2019, Czech Women's First League club Slavia Prague announced the signing of Černá. She made her professional debut on 20 March 2019 in a 1–1 draw against Bayern Munich. She scored her first four goals for the club ten days later, on 30 March, in a 11–0 win against Lokomotiva Brno Horní Heršpice.

On 5 July 2024, Černá joined Sparta Prague as a free agent. She made her league debut for the club on 18 August 2024 in a 5–0 away win against Pardubice. On 18 May 2026, she signed a contract extension with the club.

== International career ==
Černá began her international career for Czech Republic with the under-19 team. She played several matches for the team in qualifying stage of the 2014 UEFA Women's Under-19 Championship and the 2015 UEFA Women's Under-19 Championship.

Černá made her senior team debut on 5 March 2020 in a 1–1 draw against Finland. She scored her first goal on 31 October 2023 in a 2–2 draw against Bosnia and Herzegovina.

== Personal life ==
Černá wears a headband in every match, a habit she developed to hold her protruding ears closer to her head. Although she later underwent surgery to pin her ears back, she continued wearing it. She follows a meat-free diet, having been inspired to give up meat after watching the documentary film The Game Changers.

== Career statistics ==
=== Club ===
As of match played 12 November 2026

Appearances and goals by club, season and competition
Club	Season	League			Cup		Continental		Total	
Club	Season	Division	Apps	Goals	Apps	Goals	Apps	Goals	Apps	Goals
Slavia Prague	2018–19	CWFL	7	3	1	4	2 (Note: Appearances in UEFA Women's Champions League)	0	10	7
Slavia Prague	2019–20	CWFL	13	4	2	5	3	0	18	9
Slavia Prague	2020–21	CWFL	19	9	—		2	0	21	9
Slavia Prague	2021–22	CWFL	20	8	1	1	2	0	23	9
Slavia Prague	2022–23	CWFL	19	7	4	2	8	0	31	9
Slavia Prague	2023–24	CWFL	19	6	3	0	8	1	30	7
Slavia Prague	Total		97	37	11	12	25	1	133	50
Sparta Prague	2024–25	CWFL	20	9	4	1	2	0	26	10
Sparta Prague	2025–26	CWFL	18	5	3	3	10 (Note: Two appearances in UEFA Women's Champions League; eight appearances, two goals in UEFA Women's Europa Cup)	2	31	10
Sparta Prague	2026–27	CWFL	10	4	0	0	6 (Note: Two appearances, one goal in UEFA Women's Champions League; four appearances in UEFA Women's Europa Cup)	1	16	5
Sparta Prague	Total		48	18	7	4	18	3	73	25
Career total			145	55	18	16	43	4	206	75

=== International ===
As of match played 13 October 2026

Appearances and goals by national team and year
National team	Year	Apps	Goals
Czech Republic	2020	5	0
Czech Republic	2021	6	0
Czech Republic	2022	7	0
Czech Republic	2023	12	2
Czech Republic	2024	11	1
Czech Republic	2025	9	0
Czech Republic	2026	8	2
Total		58	5

Scores and results list Czech Republic's goal tally first, score column indicates score after each Černá goal.

List of international goals scored by Franny Černá
No.	Date	Venue	Opponent	Score	Result	Competition
1	31 October 2023	Malšovická aréna, Hradec Králové, Czech Republic	Bosnia and Herzegovina	2–2	2–2	2023–24 UEFA Women's Nations League
2	5 December 2023	CFIG Arena, Pardubice, Czech Republic	Slovenia	2–0	4–0	2023–24 UEFA Women's Nations League
3	25 October 2024	Stadion Radnik, Velika Gorica, Croatia	Belarus	8–1	8–1	UEFA Women's Euro 2025 qualifying play-offs
4	7 March 2026	Loro Boriçi Stadium, Shkodër, Albania	Albania	3–1	5–1	2027 FIFA Women's World Cup qualification
5	14 April 2026	Letní stadion, Chomutov, Czech Republuc	Montenegro	2–0	5–0	2027 FIFA Women's World Cup qualification

== Honours ==
Slavia Prague

- Czech Women's First League: 2019–20, 2021–22, 2022–23, 2023–24
- Czech Women's Cup: 2021–22, 2022–23, 2023–24

Sparta Prague

- Czech Women's First League: 2025–26
- Czech Women's Cup: 2025–26
