= Aneta Pochmanová =

Czech footballer

Personal information
- Date of birth: 12 April 2001 (age 25)
- Place of birth: Prague, Czech Republic
- Positions: Midfielder; defender

Team information
- Current team: Sparta Prague
- Number: 10

Youth career
- Jižní Město
- ČAFC Prague
- 2014–2018: Sparta Prague

Senior career*
Years	Team	Apps	(Gls)
2018–	Sparta Prague		

International career^{‡}
2020–	Czech Republic	8	(0)
- * Club domestic league appearances and goals as of 31 July 2020 ‡ National team caps and goals as of 6 February 2022

Aneta Pochmanová (born 12 April 2001) is a Czech footballer who plays as a midfielder for Sparta Prague.

She is a member of the Czech national team. She made her debut for the national team on 18 September 2020 in a match against Poland.

Pochmanová was voted talent of the year at the 2020 Czech Footballer of the Year (women).

== International goals ==
No.	Date	Venue	Opponent	Score	Result	Competition
1.	14 July 2023	Stadion v Městských sadech, Opava, Czech Republic	Slovakia	2–0	3–0	Friendly
2.	22 September 2023	Matija Gubec Stadium, Krško, Slovenia	Slovenia	1–0	2–0	2023–24 UEFA Women's Nations League
3.	30 May 2025	Letní stadion, Chomutov, Czech Republic	Croatia	3–0	5–0	2025 UEFA Women's Nations League
