= Lucie Ratajová =

Czech football referee

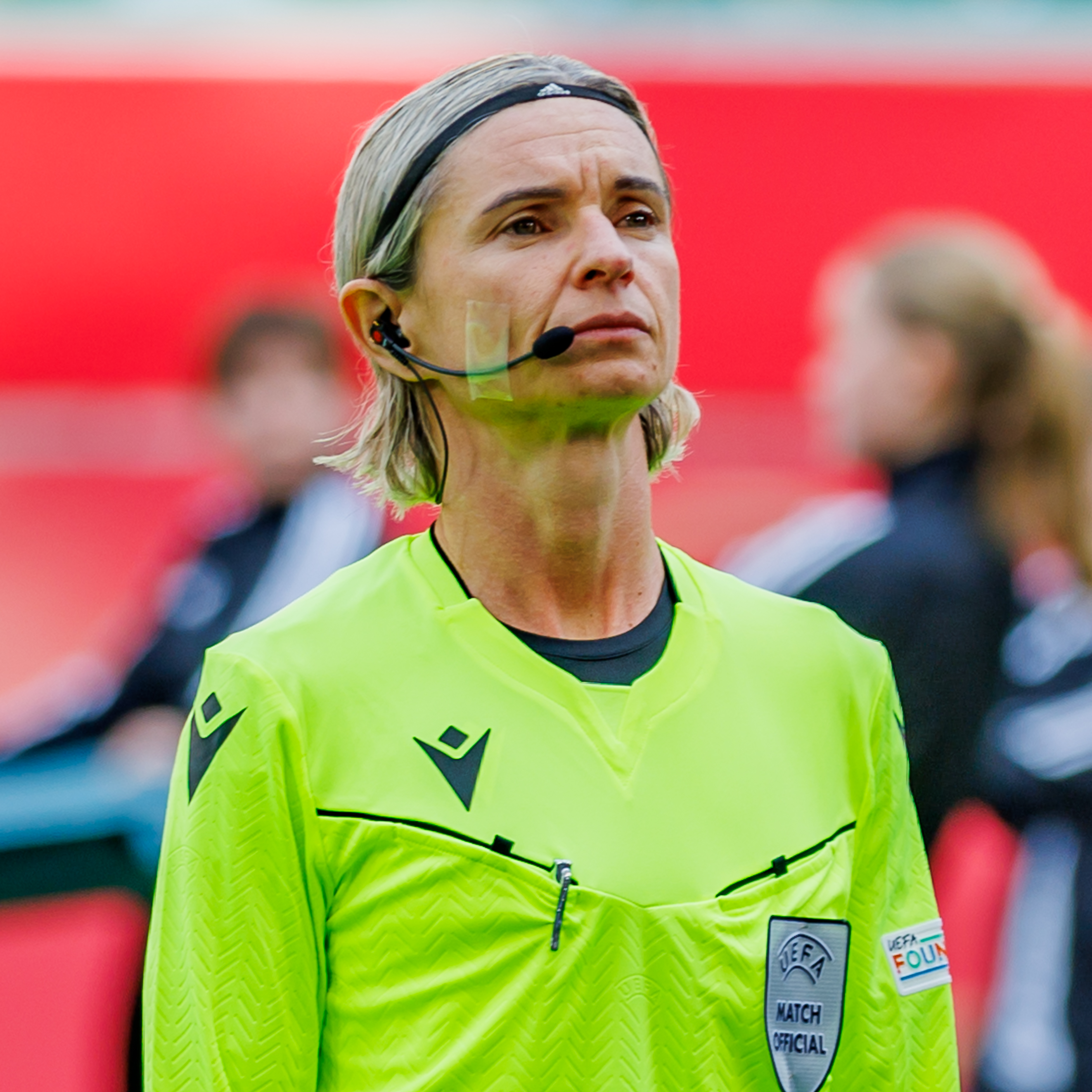
- Full name: Lucie Ratajová
- Born: 2 December 1979 (age 46); Czechoslovakia
- Other occupation: Police officer

Domestic
| Years | League | Role |
| 2013– | Czech First League | Assistant referee |

International
| Years | League | Role |
| 2009– | FIFA listed | Assistant referee |

Lucie Ratajová (born 2 December 1979) is a Czech football referee.

== Career ==
In the Czech Domestic league system, Ratajová has refereed in the Czech First League.

At confederation level she has officiated at the UEFA Women's Champions League, UEFA Women's Euro and FIFA Women's World Cup. She also has refereed at the 2016 and 2020 Summer Olympics.

Ratajová was appointed to be an official at the 2023 FIFA Women's World Cup in Australia and New Zealand.

== Personal life ==
Ratajová is dating footballer Markéta Ringelová.
