= Eva Bartoňová =

Czech footballer (born 1993)

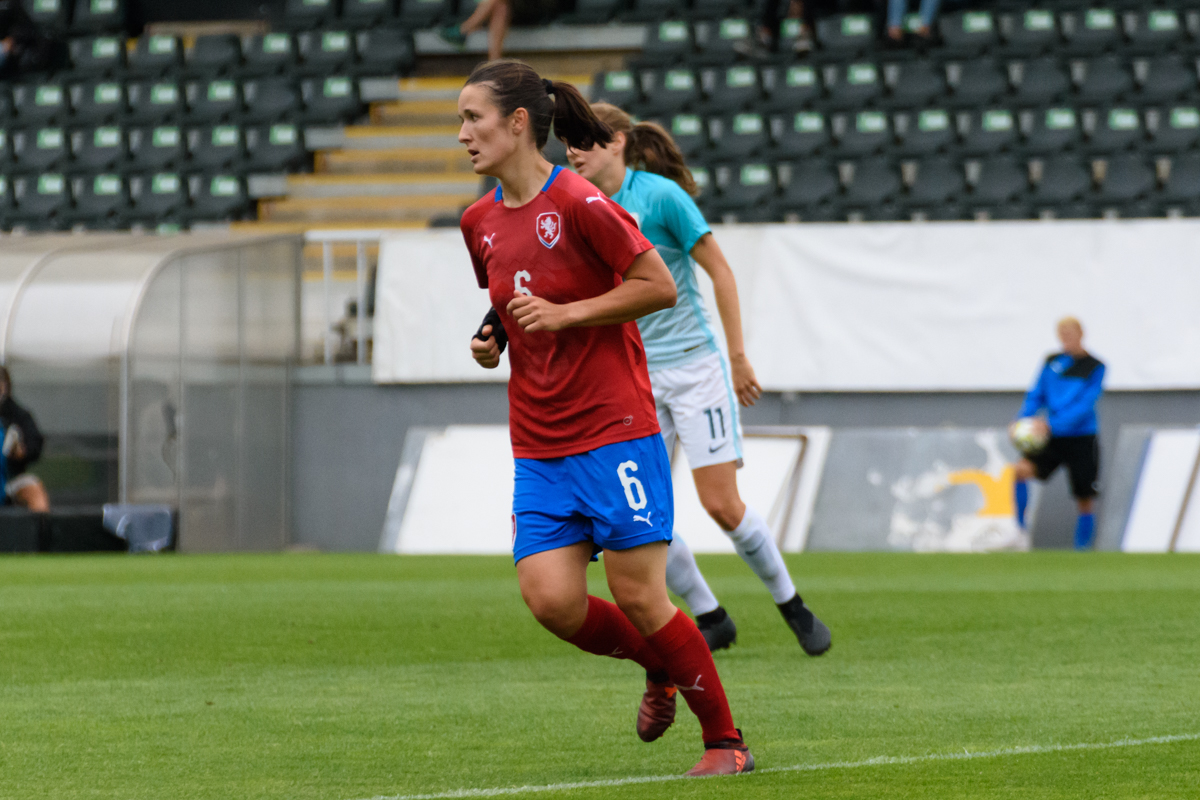
- Bartoňová in 2018

Personal information
- Full name: Eva Bartoňová
- Date of birth: 17 October 1993 (age 33)
- Place of birth: Jilemnice, Czech Republic
- Height: 1.70 m (5 ft 7 in)
- Positions: Defender; midfielder

Team information
- Current team: Sparta Prague
- Number: 9

Youth career
- Studenec
- Hradec Králové

Senior career*
Years	Team	Apps	(Gls)
2007–2016	Sparta Prague		
2016–2019	Slavia Prague		
2019–2021	Inter Milan	20	(2)
2021–	Sparta Prague		

International career^{‡}
2010–	Czech Republic	100	(10)
- * Club domestic league appearances and goals ‡ National team caps and goals as of 13 October 2026

Eva Bartoňová (born 17 October 1993) is a Czech football midfielder, currently playing for Sparta Prague in the Czech Women's First League. Bartoňová was voted talent of the year at the 2008 Czech Footballer of the Year (women).

On 30 March 2024, Bartoňová signed a new multi-year contract with Sparta Prague. On 27 April 2026, Bartoňová signed a new contract with Sparta Prague.

She is a member of the Czech national team. She made her debut for the national team on 26 November 2010 in a match against Hungary. On 13 October 2026, Bartoňová played her 100th match for the Czech Republic in a 3–2 away loss to Scotland in the 2027 FIFA Women's World Cup qualification – UEFA play-offs.

== International goals ==
No.	Date	Venue	Opponent	Score	Result	Competition
1.	7 June 2016	Stadion Střelnice, Jablonec nad Nisou, Czech Republic	Northern Ireland	3–0	3–0	UEFA Women's Euro 2017 qualifying
2.	14 September 2017	Tórsvøllur, Tórshavn, Faroe Islands	Faroe Islands	2–0	8–0	2019 FIFA Women's World Cup qualification
3.	24 October 2017	Městský stadion, Znojmo, Czech Republic	Iceland	1–1	1–1	2019 FIFA Women's World Cup qualification
4.	27 February 2019	Pyla Stadium, Pyla, Cyprus	North Korea	2–1	2–4	2019 Cyprus Women's Cup
5.	25 February 2024	Cidade do Futebol, Oeiras, Portugal	South Korea	1–2	1–2	Friendly
6.	12 June 2024	Letní stadion, Chomutov, Czech Republic	Spain	2–1	2–1	UEFA Women's Euro 2025 qualifying
7.	25 February 2025	Stadion Střelecký ostrov, České Budějovice, Czech Republic	Albania	3–1	5–1	2025 UEFA Women's Nations League
8.	25 February 2025	Stadion Střelecký ostrov, České Budějovice, Czech Republic	Albania	5–1	5–1	2025 UEFA Women's Nations League
9.	3 June 2025	Loro Boriçi Stadium, Shkodër, Albania	Albania	1–1	2–1	2025 UEFA Women's Nations League
