= Stadion Lokomotiva Praha =

Stadium in Holešovice, Prague, Czech Republic

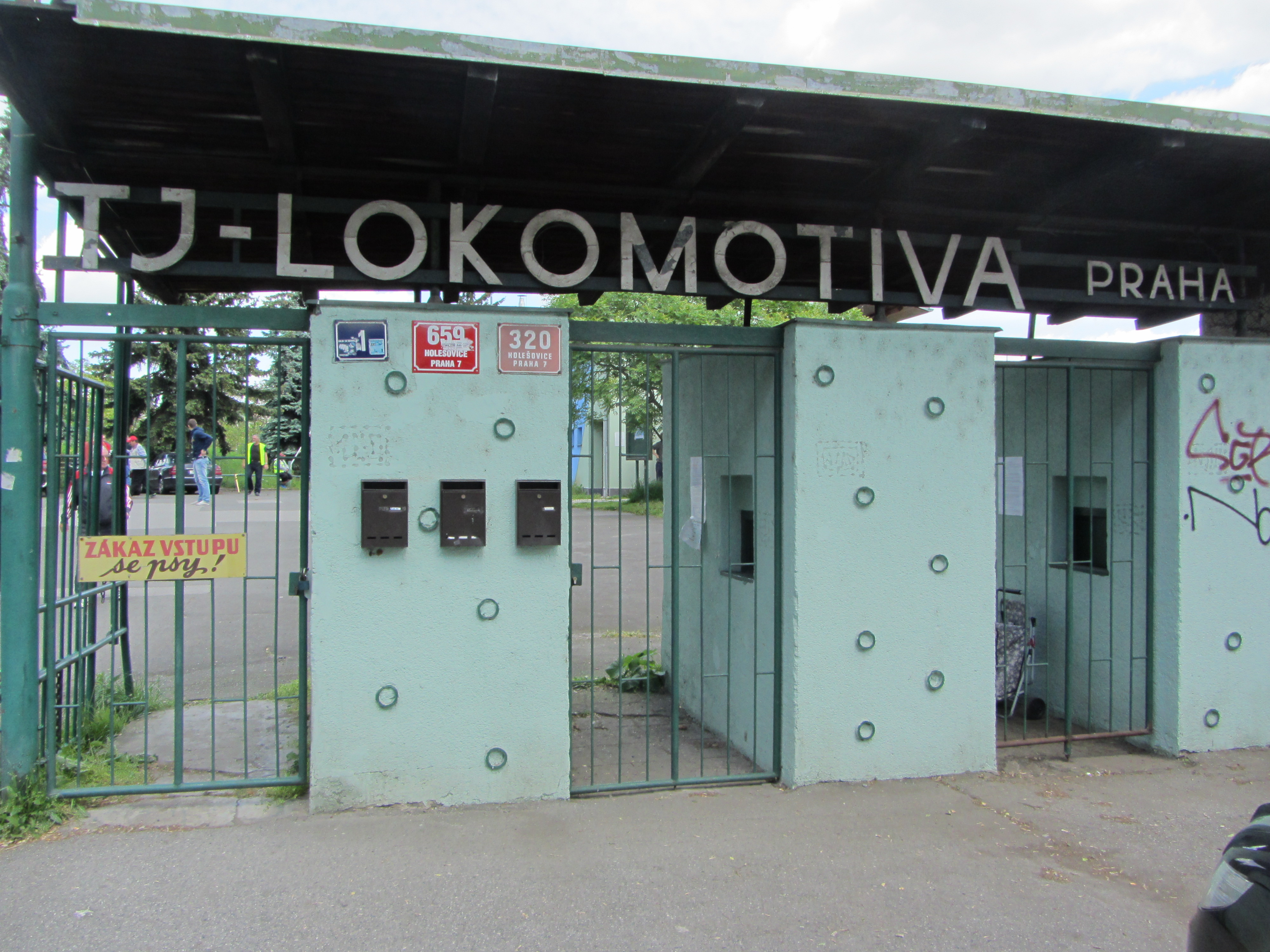
- Interactive map of Stadion Lokomotiva Praha
- Location: U Průhonu 1, Prague 7, Czech Republic, 170 00
- Coordinates: 50°6′20.46″N 14°26′43.17″E
- Capacity: 3,000 (1,500 seated)
- Field size: 105m x 68m

Construction
- Opened: 1953

Tenant
- Loko Prague

Stadion Lokomotiva Praha (formerly known as Stadion na Plynárně) is a stadium in Holešovice, Prague, Czech Republic, opened in 1953. It is currently used mostly for football matches and is the home ground of Loko Prague. The ground hosted matches in the 2013–14 Czech National Football League.

== Transport ==
The stadium is around ten minutes' walk from Nádraží Holešovice metro station. Tram services 12 and 14 call at the U Průhonu stop, which is approximately 400 metres east of the stadium entrance.
