= Andrea Stašková =

Czech footballer (born 2000)

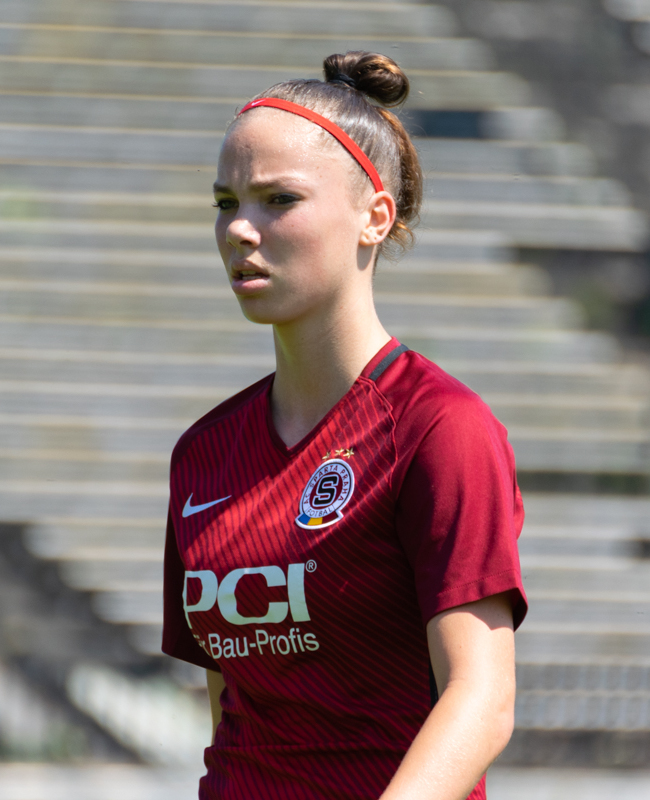
- Stašková with Sparta Prague in 2018

Personal information
- Date of birth: 12 May 2000 (age 26)
- Place of birth: Znojmo, Czech Republic
- Height: 1.83 m (6 ft 0 in)
- Position: Striker

Team information
- Current team: Fenerbahçe
- Number: 77

Youth career
- Znojmo
- Sparta Prague

Senior career*
Years	Team	Apps	(Gls)
2016–2019	Sparta Prague	?	(46)
2019–2022	Juventus	51	(15)
2022–2023	Atlético Madrid	27	(3)
2023–2024	AC Milan	21	(6)
2024–2025	Galatasaray	18	(5)
2025–	Fenerbahçe	31	(27)

International career^{‡}
2016–2018	Czech Republic U17	14	(4)
2018–2019	Czech Republic U19	8	(10)
2018–	Czech Republic	34	(15)
- * Club domestic league appearances and goals as of 10:27, 20 May 2026 (UTC) ‡ National team caps and goals as of 10 December 2023 (UTC)

Andrea Stašková (born 12 May 2000) is a Czech professional footballer who plays as a striker for Turkish club Fenerbahçe and the Czech Republic women's national team.

== Club career ==
Stašková was voted talent of the year at the 2017 and 2018 Czech Footballer of the Year.

She was top scorer and was voted as a best player of the international indoor football tournament Turbine Hallencup 2018.

In the 2018–19 season, Stašková was top scorer of the Czech Women's First League with 32 goals.

Stašková was named 2021 and 2022 Czech Footballer of the Year (women).

=== Juventus ===
On 3 July 2019, Stašková signed a contract with Italian club Juventus.

=== Atlético Madrid ===
On 28 June 2022, she joined Atlético Madrid.

=== AC Milan ===
On 1 July 2023, Stašková joined AC Milan.

=== Galatasaray ===
On 23 August 2024, Stašková signed a one-year contract with Turkish Super League club Galatasaray.

=== Fenerbahçe ===
On 18 July 2025, Stašková signed a two-year contract with Turkish club Fenerbahçe.

== Personal life ==
On 27 December 2023, Stašková proposed to her girlfriend Tereza Bendová in Paris in front of the Eiffel Tower.

== Career statistics ==
No.	Date	Venue	Opponent	Score	Result	Competition
1.	14 June 2019	Letní stadion, Chomutov, Czech Republic	Russia	1–0	2–0	Friendly
2.	30 August 2019	Zimbru Stadium, Chișinău, Moldova	Moldova	6–0	7–0	UEFA Women's Euro 2022 qualifying
3.	7 November 2019	Bayil Arena, Baku, Azerbaijan	Azerbaijan	2–0	4–0	UEFA Women's Euro 2022 qualifying
4.	22 September 2020	Stadion Miejski, Bielsko-Biała, Poland	Poland	1–0	2–0	UEFA Women's Euro 2022 qualifying
5.	1 December 2020	Letní stadion, Chomutov, Czech Republic	Moldova	1–0	7–0	UEFA Women's Euro 2022 qualifying
6.	1 December 2020	Letní stadion, Chomutov, Czech Republic	Moldova	6–0	7–0	UEFA Women's Euro 2022 qualifying
7.	17 September 2021	Euroborg, Groningen, Netherlands	Netherlands	1–0	1–1	2023 FIFA Women's World Cup qualification
8.	21 September 2021	Stadion u Nisy, Liberec, Czech Republic	Cyprus	1–0	8–0	2023 FIFA Women's World Cup qualification
9.	21 September 2021	Stadion u Nisy, Liberec, Czech Republic	Cyprus	6–0	8–0	2023 FIFA Women's World Cup qualification
10.	1 September 2022	AEK Arena – Georgios Karapatakis, Larnaca, Cyprus	Cyprus	6–0	6–0	2023 FIFA Women's World Cup qualification
11.	7 October 2022	Letná Stadion, Zlín, Czech Republic	Hungary	1–0	3–3	Friendly
12.	7 October 2022	Letná Stadion, Zlín, Czech Republic	Hungary	2–0	3–3	Friendly
13.	7 October 2022	Letná Stadion, Zlín, Czech Republic	Hungary	3–3	3–3	Friendly
14.	15 November 2022	Stadionul Arcul de Triumf, Bucharest, Romania	Romania	1–0	2–1	Friendly
15.	19 February 2023	CommBank Stadium, Sydney, Australia	Jamaica	1–0	3–2	2023 Cup of Nations
16.	14 July 2023	Stadion v Městských sadech, Opava, Czech Republic	Slovakia	3–0	3–0	Friendly
17.	5 December 2023	CFIG Arena, Pardubice, Czech Republic	Slovenia	3–0	4–0	2023–24 UEFA Women's Nations League
18.	5 April 2024	Městský fotbalový stadion, Uherské Hradiště, Czech Republic	Denmark	1–1	1–3	UEFA Women's Euro 2025 qualifying
19.	25 October 2024	Gradski stadion Velika Gorica, Velika Gorica, Croatia	Belarus	6–1	8–1	UEFA Women's Euro 2025 qualifying play-offs
20.	21 February 2025	Stadion Aldo Drosina, Pula, Croatia	Croatia	1–0	4–0	2025 UEFA Women's Nations League
21.	25 February 2025	Stadion Střelecký ostrov, České Budějovice, Czech Republic	Albania	4–1	5–1	2025 UEFA Women's Nations League

== Honours ==
Sparta Prague

- National Champion: 2017–18, 2018–19
- Czech Women's Cup: 2017, 2018, 2019
- Turbine Hallencup: 2019

Juventus

- Serie A: 2019–20, 2020–21, 2021–22
- Coppa Italia: 2021–22
- Supercoppa Italiana: 2019, 2020–21, 2021–22

Fenerbahçe

- Super League: 2025–26
