= Filip Klapka =

Czech footballer

Personal information
- Date of birth: 20 June 1981 (age 45)
- Place of birth: Hradec Králové, Czechoslovakia
- Height: 1.87 m (6 ft 2 in)
- Position: Midfielder

Team information
- Current team: Slavia Prague (women) (manager)

Youth career
- 1987–2001: SK Hradec Králové

Senior career*
Years	Team	Apps	(Gls)
2001–2003	FC Hradec Králové	52	(5)
2004–2010	FK Jablonec 97	114	(11)
2010	Tobol Kostanay	13	(3)
2011–2013	FC Hradec Králové	34	(3)
2013	SC Pyhra		

Managerial career
- 2025: Slavia Prague (women) (assistant)
- 2026–: Slavia Prague (women)
- * Club domestic league appearances and goals as of 16 June 2013

Filip Klapka (born 20 June 1981) is a Czech football manager and former player.
