= Adéla Odehnalová =

Czech footballer

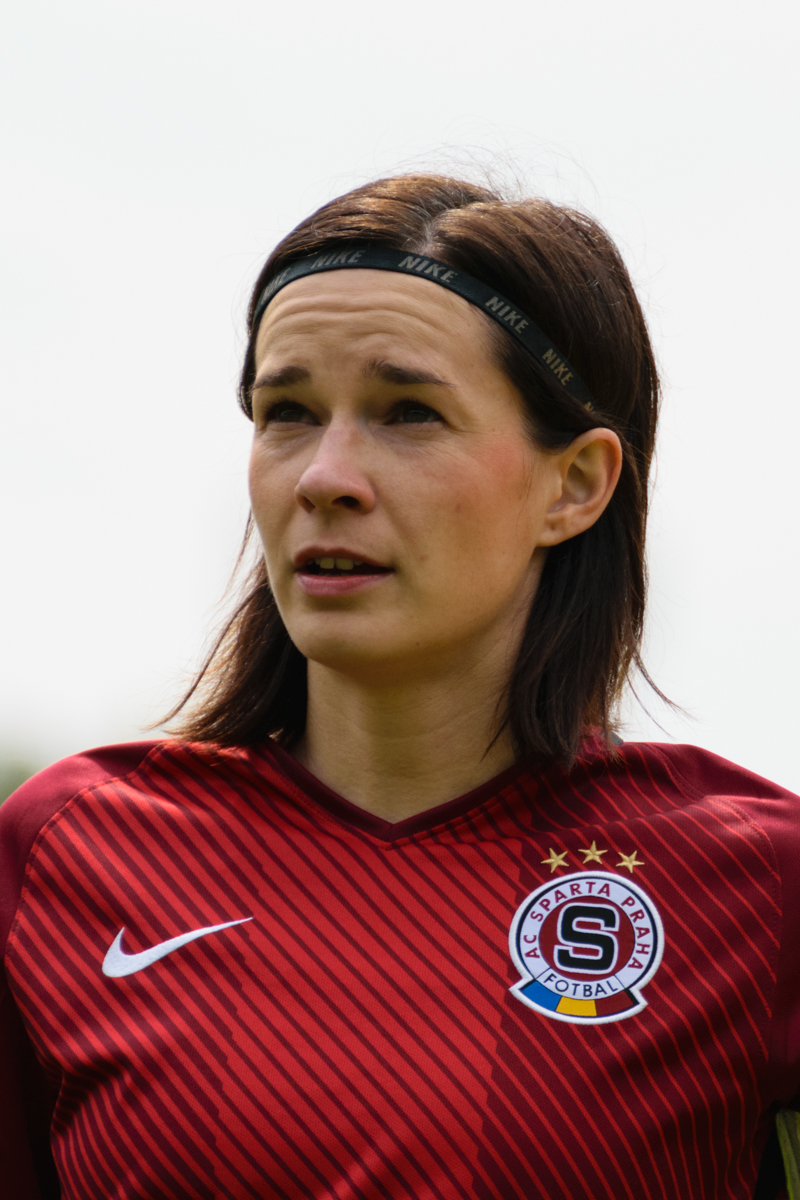
- Odehnalová in 2019

Personal information
- Full name: Adéla Odehnalová
- Date of birth: 2 January 1990 (age 36)
- Place of birth: Hradec Králové, Czechoslovakia
- Height: 1.76 m (5 ft 9 in)
- Positions: Defender; midfielder

Senior career*
Years	Team	Apps	(Gls)
2009–2014	Slavia Prague	41	(1)
2014–2021	Sparta Praha		

International career^{‡}
2010–2015	Czech Republic	28	(0)
- * Club domestic league appearances and goals ‡ National team caps and goals as of 1 July 2021

Adéla Odehnalová (born 2 January 1990) is a former Czech football defender, who last played for Sparta Praha in the Czech First Division.

She was a member of the Czech national team.
