= Michael Steiner (footballer) =

Austrian footballer and manager

Personal information
- Date of birth: 10 August 1974 (age 52)
- Place of birth: Salzburg, Austria
- Height: 1.74 m (5 ft 9 in)
- Position: Midfielder

Youth career
- –1988: 1.Halleiner SK Jugend
- 1988–1989: Salzburger AK 1914 Jugend
- 1989–1993: SV Austria Salzburg

Senior career*
Years	Team	Apps	(Gls)
1993–1994	Casino Salzburg	8	(0)
1994–1995	FC Puch	3	(0)
1996–1997	First Vienna FC	5	(0)
1997	Hellas Kagran		
1997–1998	Floridsdorfer AC		
1998	1. Simmeringer SC	2	(1)
1998–1999	Austria Salzburg Ameteure		

International career
1994	Austria U21	2	(0)

Managerial career
- 2009–2012: Red Bull Salzburg (academy)
- 2012–2014: FC Pinzgau Saalfelden
- 2014–2015: SKN St. Pölten
- 2015–2016: Rapid Wien II
- 2016–2017: Rapid Wien (academy)
- 2021: Basel (director of youth development)
- 2021–2023: TSV Hartberg (academy director)
- 2023: SV Lafnitz
- 2025–2026: Sparta Prague women
- * Club domestic league appearances and goals

Michael Steiner (born 10 August 1974) is an Austrian football coach and a former player.

== Playing career ==
Steiner played as a midfielder until retiring in 1999.

== Coaching record ==
As of 31 May 2016

Team	From	To	Record								
Team	From	To	G	W	D	L	GF	GA	GD	Win %	Ref.
FC Pinzgau Saalfelden	22 October 2012	12 June 2014	46	25	5	16	85	67	+18	54.35	
SKN St. Pölten	10 October 2014	21 March 2015	13	3	5	5	10	12	−2	23.08	
SK Rapid Wien II	1 July 2015	-	29	7	9	13	37	56	−19	24.14	
