= Michaela Khýrová =

Czech footballer (born 2000)

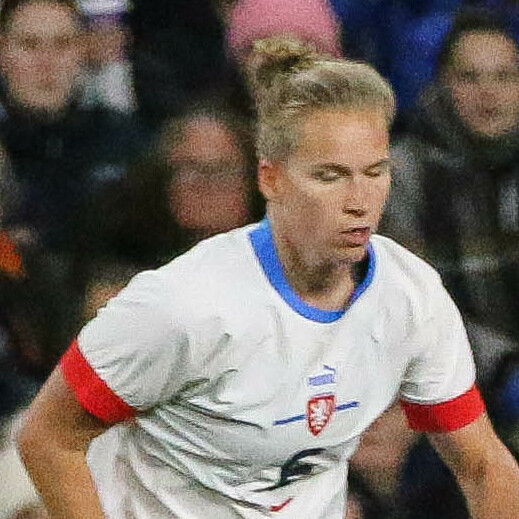

Personal information
- Date of birth: 3 February 2000 (age 26)
- Place of birth: Hradec Králové, Czech Republic
- Height: 1.67 m (5 ft 6 in)
- Position: Midfielder

Team information
- Current team: Sparta Prague
- Number: 11

Youth career
- 2005–2008: FK Jaroměř
- 2008–2013: Hradec Králové
- 2013–2018: Sparta Prague

Senior career*
| Years | Team | Apps | (Gls) |
| 2018–2019 | Sparta Prague | | |
| 2019 | → Dukla Prague (loan) | | |
| 2019–2024 | Slavia Prague | | |
| 2024– | Sparta Prague | | |

International career^{‡}
| 2019– | Czech Republic | 50 | (14) |
- * Club domestic league appearances and goals as of 15 November 2022 ‡ National team caps and goals as of 9 June 2026

Michaela Khýrová (born 3 February 2000) is a Czech professional footballer who plays as a midfielder for Sparta Prague in the Czech Republic and for the Czech national team.

== Career ==
Khýrová has been capped for the Czech Republic national team, appearing for the team during the 2023 FIFA Women's World Cup qualifying cycle, in the UEFA Women's Euro 2025 qualifiers and the UEFA Women's Nations League.

Khýrová has played in the UEFA Women's Champions League.

On 1 July 2024, Khýrová signed a contract with Sparta Prague as a free agent.

On 19 November 2025, Khýrová scored a hat-trick in Sparta's 4–0 round of 16, second leg win against BSC YB in the 2025–26 UEFA Women's Europa Cup.

On 6 February 2026, Khýrová signed a new multi-year contract with Sparta Prague.

== Honours ==
Slavia Prague

- Czech Women's First League: 2019–20, 2021–22, 2022–23, 2023–24
- Czech Women's Cup: 2023, 2024

Sparta Prague

- Czech Women's First League: 2025–26
- Czech Women's Cup: 2026

== International career ==
As of match played 9 June 2026

Appearances and goals by national team and year
| National team | Year | Apps | Goals |
|---|---|---|---|
| Czech Republic | 2019 | 2 | 0 |
| Czech Republic | 2020 | 1 | 0 |
| Czech Republic | 2021 | 2 | 0 |
| Czech Republic | 2022 | 6 | 3 |
| Czech Republic | 2023 | 13 | 1 |
| Czech Republic | 2024 | 11 | 2 |
| Czech Republic | 2025 | 9 | 4 |
| Czech Republic | 2026 | 6 | 4 |
| Total | | 50 | 14 |

List of international goals scored by Michaela Khýrová
| No. | Date | Venue | Opponent | Score | Result | Competition |
|---|---|---|---|---|---|---|
| 1. | 20 February 2022 | Dignity Health Sports Park, Carson, United States | Iceland | 1–2 | 1–2 | 2022 SheBelieves Cup |
| 2. | 1 September 2022 | AEK Arena – Georgios Karapatakis, Larnaca, Cyprus | Cyprus | 3–0 | 6–0 | 2023 FIFA Women's World Cup qualification |
| 3. | 6 September 2022 | Antonis Papadopoulos Stadium, Larnaca, Cyprus | Belarus | 4–0 | 7–0 | 2023 FIFA Women's World Cup qualification |
| 4. | 5 December 2023 | CFIG Arena, Pardubice, Czech Republic | Slovenia | 4–0 | 4–0 | 2023–24 UEFA Women's Nations League |
| 5. | 21 February 2024 | Estádio António Coimbra da Mota, Estoril, Portugal | Portugal | 1–3 | 1–3 | Friendly |
| 6. | 25 October 2024 | Gradski stadion Velika Gorica, Velika Gorica, Croatia | Belarus | 1–0 | 8–1 | UEFA Women's Euro 2025 qualifying play-offs |
| 7. | 21 February 2025 | Stadion Aldo Drosina, Pula, Croatia | Croatia | 2–0 | 4–0 | 2025 UEFA Women's Nations League |
| 8. | 30 May 2025 | Letní stadion, Chomutov, Czech Republic | Croatia | 1–0 | 5–0 | 2025 UEFA Women's Nations League |
| 9. | 3 June 2025 | Loro Boriçi Stadium, Shkodër, Albania | Albania | 2–1 | 2–1 | 2025 UEFA Women's Nations League |
| 10. | 24 October 2025 | Městský fotbalový stadion Miroslava Valenty, Uherské Hradiště, Czech Republic | Austria | 1–0 | 1–0 | 2025 UEFA Women's Nations League play-off matches |
| 11. | 7 March 2026 | Loro Boriçi Stadium, Shkodër, Albania | Albania | 2–1 | 5–1 | 2027 FIFA Women's World Cup qualification |
| 12. | 7 March 2026 | Loro Boriçi Stadium, Shkodër, Albania | Albania | 4–1 | 5–1 | 2027 FIFA Women's World Cup qualification |
| 13. | 18 April 2026 | Gradski stadion, Nikšić, Montenegro | Montenegro | 2–1 | 4–1 | 2027 FIFA Women's World Cup qualification |
| 14. | 9 June 2026 | Cardiff City Stadium, Cardiff, Wales | Wales | 1–0 | 1–3 | 2027 FIFA Women's World Cup qualification |
