= Hallie Bergford =

American soccer player (born 2002)

Personal information
- Full name: Hallie Jane Bergford
- Date of birth: January 26, 2002 (age 24)
- Height: 5 ft 11 in (1.80 m)
- Position: Forward

Team information
- Current team: Sparta Prague
- Number: 4

Youth career
- Blackhills FC
- 2016–2019: Tumwater Thunderbirds

College career
Years	Team	Apps	(Gls)
2020–2024	Seattle Redhawks	84	(11)

Senior career*
Years	Team	Apps	(Gls)
2025	FC Olympia	3	(0)
2025	Salmon Bay FC	8	(3)
2025–	Sparta Prague	25	(16)
- * Club domestic league appearances and goals as of September 19, 2026

Hallie Jane Bergford (born January 26, 2002) is an American professional soccer player who plays as a forward for Czech Women's First League club Sparta Prague. She played college soccer for the Seattle Redhawks.

== Early life ==
Bergford grew up in Olympia, Washington. Her father, Peter, played professional soccer after his college career at Northwest University; after a trial with the Seattle Sounders, he joined Norwegian third-tier club Pors Grenland. Bergford began playing soccer in elementary school, and she was also a competitive swimmer. She played varsity soccer all four years at Tumwater High School, scoring 55 goals in her career, and twice earned Evergreen Conference MVP honors. She was named The Olympian's area player of the year after scoring 36 goals in her senior year in 2019. She played club soccer for Blackhills FC. She committed to play college soccer for the Seattle Redhawks during her senior year.

== College career ==
Bergford played five seasons for the Seattle Redhawks, making 84 appearances and scoring 11 goals between 2020 and 2024. She was the first Redhawk to be named Western Athletic Conference (WAC) Freshman of the Year. She twice helped the Redhawks reach the WAC tournament final and won a share of the WAC regular-season title in her freshman year. She returned for a fifth season using her extra year of eligibility due to the COVID-19 pandemic, earning second-team All-WAC honors as a graduate student in 2024.

== Club career ==
After college, Bergford pursued her childhood dream to play professionally in Norway like her father, though she returned home without a contract. She spent part of the summer with Seattle-based USL W League club Salmon Bay.

On August 15, 2025, Czech club Sparta Prague announced that they had signed Bergford to her first professional contract. She made her professional debut the next day, scoring a hat-trick in a season-opening 3–1 victory over Viktoria Plzeň. Two weeks later, she scored a second hat-trick in a 4–4 draw with Nordsjælland in the UEFA Women's Champions League second qualifying round. The following month, she scored three consecutive braces in the league, eclipsing her college career tally within seven games. On February 18, 2026, she headed an extra-time go-ahead goal against Austria Wien in the second leg of the UEFA Women's Europa Cup quarterfinals, the match ending 3–1 for Sparta to advance to the semifinals. Helping the club win their 22nd league title and 11th national cup, she finished her debut season with 18 goals, including 12 in the league, and was voted by her fellow players into the league's Best XI.

== Honors and awards ==
Seattle Redhawks

- Western Athletic Conference: 2020

Sparta Prague

- Czech Women's First League: 2025–26
- Czech Women's Cup: 2025–26

Individual

- Czech Women's First League Best XI: 2025–26
- Second-team All-WAC: 2024
- WAC Freshman of the Year: 2020
