= Peter Bartalský =

Slovak footballer

Personal information
- Full name: Peter Bartalský
- Date of birth: 27 January 1978 (age 48)
- Place of birth: Malacky, Czechoslovakia
- Height: 1.91 m (6 ft 3 in)
- Position: Goalkeeper

Team information
- Current team: SK Třeboradice

Youth career
- Malacky

Senior career*
Years	Team	Apps	(Gls)
1997–2003	Inter Bratislava		
2004–2010	Žižkov	49	(0)
2011	Slovan Bratislava	1	(0)
2012–2013	Trenčín	1	(0)
2015–2016	Bohemians Prague		
2016–	SK Třeboradice	12	(0)

Managerial career
- 2018–2020: Sparta Prague (women)
- * Club domestic league appearances and goals as of 10 March 2019

Peter Bartalský (born 27 January 1978) is a Slovak football goalkeeper who currently plays for the Prague Championship club SK Třeboradice and former manager of Czech club Sparta Prague (women).

Bartalský joined Bohemians Prague in 2015.
