= Petra Bertholdová =

Czech footballer (born 1984)

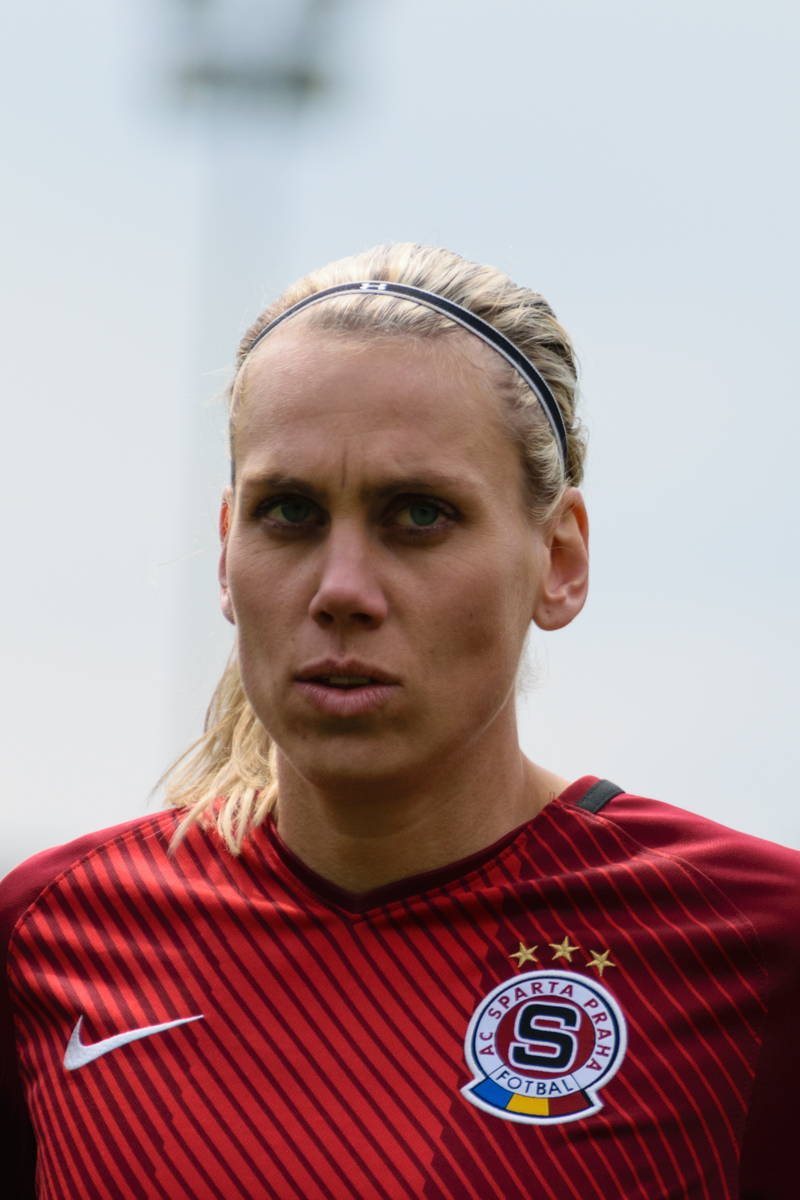
- Bertholdová in 2019

Personal information
- Full name: Petra Bertholdová
- Date of birth: 24 November 1984 (age 41)
- Place of birth: Chomutov, Czechoslovakia
- Height: 1.70 m (5 ft 7 in)
- Positions: Defender; midfielder

Youth career
- FK Jirkov Kyjice
- Sparta Doly Kladno

Senior career*
Years	Team	Apps	(Gls)
- DFC Prague
2004–2024	Sparta Prague		

International career^{‡}
2002–2024	Czech Republic	124	(4)
- * Club domestic league appearances and goals ‡ National team caps and goals as of 3 December 2024

Petra Bertholdová (born 24 November 1984) is a retired Czech football defender, who played for Sparta Prague in the Czech Women's First League from 2004 to 2024.

She was a member of the Czech national team. Bertholdová made her debut for the national team on 24 March 2002 in a match against Norway. She was absent from the national team for two years between 2009 and 2011 due to a knee injury and subsequent surgery. On 17 September 2021, Bertholdová played her 100th match for Czech Republic in a 1–1 away draw with Netherlands in the 2023 FIFA Women's World Cup qualification (UEFA). On 3 December 2024, after home loss 1–2 against Portugal, Bertholdová decided to end her national team career.

== International goals ==
Statistics accurate as of match played 15 November 2022.

No.	Date	Venue	Opponent	Score	Result	Competition
1.	3 March 2009	Brezová pod Bradlom, Slovakia	Slovakia	1–0	1–1	Friendly
2.	29 May 2009	Náchod, Czech Republic	Poland	1–0	2-1	Friendly
3.	4 October 2018	Stadion Širůch, Staré Město, Czech Republic	Slovakia	1–0	2–0	Friendly
4.	30 August 2019	Zimbru Stadium, Chișinău, Moldova	Moldova	3–0	7–0	UEFA Women's Euro 2022 qualifying

== See also ==
- List of women's footballers with 100 or more international caps
