= Aneta Dědinová =

Czech footballer

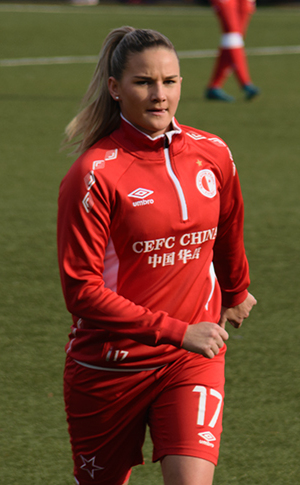

Personal information
- Full name: Aneta Dědinová
- Date of birth: 9 March 1994 (age 32)
- Place of birth: Příbram, Czech Republic
- Height: 1.67 m (5 ft 6 in)
- Position: Defender

Team information
- Current team: Slovan Liberec (on loan from Sparta Prague)

Youth career
- Dolní Hbity
- 2011–2012: → Slavia Prague (loan)

Senior career*
Years	Team	Apps	(Gls)
2009–2013	1. FK Příbram	38	(31)
2012–2013	→ Slavia Prague (loan)	15	(0)
2013–2016	Sparta Prague		
2016	→ Bohemians Prague (loan)		
2016–2020	Slavia Prague		
2020–	Sparta Prague		
2025–	→ Slovan Liberec (loan)	0	(0)

International career
2013–	Czech Republic	27	(1)
- * Club domestic league appearances and goals

Aneta Dědinová (born 9 March 1994) is a Czech footballer who plays as a defender for Slovan Liberec on loan from Sparta Prague in the Czech Women's First League.

On 22 June 2024, Dědinová signed a new multi-year contract with Sparta Prague.

On 5 September 2025, Dědinová joined Slovan Liberec on a one-year loan deal.

She is a member of the Czech national team and made her debut for the national team in a match against Poland on 20 August 2013.

== Honours ==
Sparta Prague

- Czech Women's First League: 2020–21
- Czech Cup: 2015

Slavia Prague

- Czech Women's First League : 2016–17, 2019–20.
