= AC Sparta Prague (women) =

Sparta Prague
- Full name: Athletic Club Sparta Praha Fotbal a.s.
- Nicknames: Sparťanky (Spartan women)
- Founded: 1966; 60 years ago
- Ground: Stadion SK Prosek, Prague
- Capacity: 2,600 (1,000 seated)
- Chairman: Daniel Křetínský
- Manager: Jessica Torny
- League: Czech Women's First League
- 2025–26: 1st (champions)
- Website: https://sparta.cz/en/tymy/3-women-a/hraci
Home colours	Away colours

The women's section of AC Sparta Prague is a women's football club from Prague, Czech Republic. Together with their local neighbour Slavia, Sparta dominates the national league having won 22 of the 33 titles while Slavia has won the other eleven. They have taken part in UEFA competitions several times and got their best result in the 2025–26 UEFA Women's Europa Cup when they reached the semi-finals, losing over two legs to Hammarby and in the 2005–06 UEFA Women's Cup when they reached the quarter-finals, losing over two legs to Djurgården.

Ahead of the 2024–25 season, it was announced that Sparta players would be becoming full professionals for the first time.

On 4 October 2025, Sparta Prague signed a memorandum about cooperation with Prague 9 and 18. Sparta would build a new stadium for women's football academy on the grounds of Stadion SK Prosek.

On 22 November 2026, captain Hana Bubeníková, who led Sparta's women's team to its first title, became the first woman to be inducted into Sparta Prague's Hall of Fame.

== Honours ==
=== Leagues ===
In Czechoslovakia

- Champions of Czechoslovakia
  - Winners (12): 1976, 1977, 1978, 1980, 1981, 1982, 1984, 1985, 1986, 1989, 1990, 1991

In the Czech Republic

- Czech Women's First League
  - Winners (22): 1994–2002, 2005–2013, 2018, 2019, 2021, 2026

=== Cups ===
- Czech Women's Cup
  - Winners (11): 2008, 2009, 2010, 2011, 2012, 2013, 2015, 2017, 2018, 2019, 2026

=== Invitational ===
- Menton Tournament (1): 1984
- Turbine Hallencup (1): 2019

== European Record ==
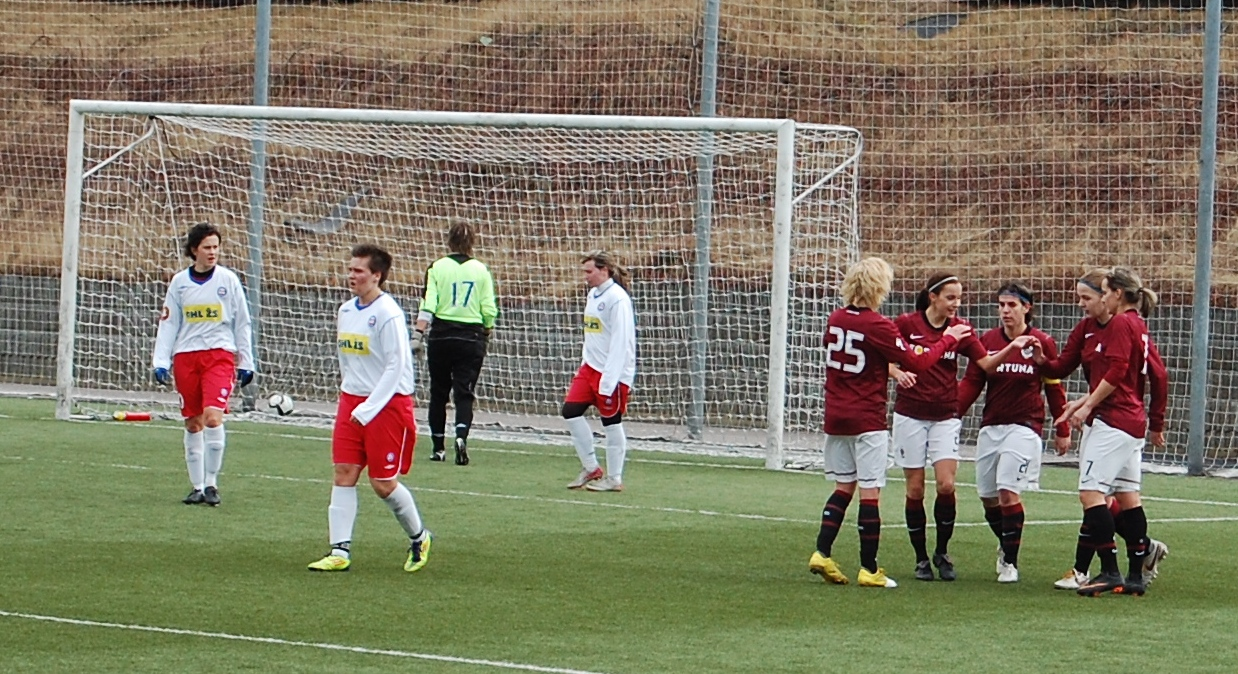
Sparta celebrate a goal

- Further details: AC Sparta Prague (women) in European football

Season	Qualifying round	Round of 32	Round of 16	Quarter-finals	Semi-finals	Final
UEFA Women's Cup
2001–02		(Sweden) Umeå ^{1}				
2002–03		(Sweden) Umeå ^{1}				
2005–06		(Belarus) Universitet ^{1}	(Switzerland) Luzern ^{1}	(Sweden) Djurgården		
2006–07			(Netherlands) Saestum ^{1}			
2007–08		(Romania) Clujana ^{1}	(France) Olympique ^{1}			
2008–09		(Spain) Levante ^{1}				
UEFA Women's Champions League
2009–10		(Kazakhstan) Alma	(England) Arsenal			
2010–11		(Belgium) Sint-Truidense	(Sweden) Linköping			
2011–12		(Cyprus) Apollon	(France) Olympique			
2012–13		(Bosnia and Herzegovina) Sarajevo	(Russia) Rossiyanka			
2013–14		(Switzerland) Zürich				
2014–15		(Lithuania) Gintra				
2016–17		(Netherlands) Twente				
2017–18		(Greece) P.A.O.K.	(Sweden) Linköping			
2018–19		(Netherlands) Ajax				
2019–20		(Iceland) Breiðablik				
2020–21		(Scotland) Glasgow City	(France) Paris Saint-Germain			

- ^{1} Group stage. Highest-ranked eliminated team in case of qualification, lowest-ranked qualified team in case of elimination.

UEFA Women's Champions League
Season	Round 1	Round 2	Round 3	Group stage	Quarter-finals	Semi-finals	Final
2021–22		(Denmark) Køge					
2022–23		(Italy) Roma					
2023–24		(Germany) Frankfurt					
2024–25	(Sweden) Linköping						
2024–25	(France) Paris						
2025–26		(Denmark) Nordsjælland					
2025–26		(Italy) Roma					
2026–27			(Switzerland) Servette Chênois				

UEFA Women's Europa Cup
Season	Round 1	Round 2	Round of 16	Quarter-finals	Semi-finals	Final
2025–26		(Hungary) Ferencvárosi	(Switzerland) Young Boys	Austria Wien	(Sweden) Hammarby	
2026–27		(Romania) Farul Constanța	(Portugal) Torreense			

== Players ==
=== Current squad ===
As of 12 September 2026.

Note: Flags indicate national team as defined under FIFA eligibility rules; some limited exceptions apply. Players may hold more than one non-FIFA nationality.

No.	Pos.	Nation	Player
3	DF	CZE	Dominika Huvarová
4	FW	USA	Hallie Bergford
5	DF	AUT	Lainie Fuchs
6	MF	USA	Hope Breslin
7	MF	CZE	Antonie Stárová
8	MF	SVK	Sára Kerešová
9	DF	CZE	Eva Bartoňová (captain)
10	DF	CZE	Aneta Pochmanová
11	MF	CZE	Michaela Khýrová
12	DF	CZE	Eliška Sonntagová
15	DF	CZE	Eliška Nechutová
16	DF	USA	Tori Hansen

No.	Pos.	Nation	Player
17	MF	CZE	Radka Paulenová
18	FW	ENG	Kess Elmore
19	MF	SVK	Laura Retkesová
22	MF	CZE	Franny Černá
23	FW	USA	Ellie Ospeck
24	DF	CZE	Klára Daníčková
25	MF	UKR	Anna Petryk
26	DF	CZE	Denisa Rancová
27	DF	CZE	Natálie Pešková
32	GK	CZE	Zuzana Kožuriková
33	GK	CZE	Kristýna Rajsnerová
44	GK	CZE	Nikola Harantová

=== Out on loan ===
Note: Flags indicate national team as defined under FIFA eligibility rules; some limited exceptions apply. Players may hold more than one non-FIFA nationality.

No.	Pos.	Nation	Player
—	DF	CZE	Aneta Dědinová (at Slovan Liberec)
—	MF	CZE	Diana Šafářová (at Slovan Liberec)
—	FW	CZE	Adéla Trachtová (at Prague Raptors)
—	GK	CZE	Eliška Urbancová (at Prague Raptors)

No.	Pos.	Nation	Player
—	FW	CZE	Stella Balázsová (at Prague Raptors)
—	MF	CZE	Eliška Truksová (at Prague Raptors)
—	FW	CZE	Karolína Krůtová (at Prague Raptors)
—	GK	SRB	Jovana Dukič (at Aktobe)
—	FW	LAT	Anastasija Poļuhoviča (at Standard Liège)

=== Former players ===
- (Czech Republic) Pavlína Ščasná
- (Czech Republic) Lucie Voňková
- (Czech Republic) Jana Sedláčková
- (Czech Republic) Iva Mocová
- (Czech Republic) Andrea Stašková
- (Mexico) Christina Burkenroad
- (United States) Kylie Strom
- (Slovakia) Lucia Ondrušová
- (Czech Republic) Jitka Chlastáková
- (Czech Republic) Simona Kohoutová
- (Jamaica) Sydney Schneider
- (Czech Republic) Lucie Martínková
- (Czech Republic) Petra Bertholdová
- (United States) Lauren Chang

== Staff ==
As of 24 September 2026.

Women's section manager

- Pavla Satrapová

Team Manager

- Adéla Pivoňková

Manager

- Jessica Torny

Assistant

- Marian Nincz

Goalkeeper Coach

- Peter Bartalský

Doctor

- Petr Čechal
- Filip Jašek

Physiotherapist

- Daniel Baťha
- Adéla Kynclová
- Adam Lešuk
- Petra Sklenářová

Fitness Coach

- Martin Čurda
- Simona Smolková

Masseur

- Miroslav Český

== Managers ==
- František Müller
- Jiří Provalil
- Dušan Žovinec (1988–2012)
- Luboš Žovinec (2012–2013)
- Jan Podolák (July 2013 – October 2014)
- Martin Šeran (October 2014 – June 2015)
- Jan Janota (July 2015 – March 2018)
- Peter Bartalský (July 2018 – June 2020)
- Martin Masaryk (June 2020 – May 2023)
- Anton Mišovec (May 2023 – September 2023)
- Pavol Gregora (November 2023 – June 2025)
- Michael Steiner (June 2025 – September 2026)
- Jessica Torny (September 2026 – present)
