= Letní stadion, Chomutov =

Multi-purpose stadium in Chomutov, Czech Republic

Letní stadion
- Interactive map of Letní stadion
- Former names: Městský stadion
- Location: Mánesova 3704, Chomutov, Czech Republic, 430 01
- Coordinates: 50°27′50″N 13°25′05″E
- Capacity: 4,800
- Surface: Grass
- Field size: 105m x 68m

Construction
- Opened: 2012

Tenants
- FC Chomutov; TJ VTŽ Chomutov (Athletics)

Letní stadion, formerly known as Městský stadion, is a multi-purpose stadium in Chomutov, Czech Republic. Used primarily for football, it is the home stadium of FC Chomutov.
