= 2019 Cyprus Women's Cup squads =

List of players competing at the 12th edition of the Cyprus Women's Cup

This article lists the squads for the 2019 Cyprus Women's Cup, the 12th edition of the Cyprus Women's Cup. The cup consisted of a series of friendly games, and was held in Cyprus from 27 February to 6 March 2019. The twelve national teams involved in the tournament registered a squad of 23 players.

The age listed for each player is on 27 February 2019, the first day of the tournament. The numbers of caps and goals listed for each player do not include any matches played after the start of tournament. The club listed is the club for which the player last played a competitive match prior to the tournament. The nationality for each club reflects the national association (not the league) to which the club is affiliated. A flag is included for coaches that are of a different nationality than their own national team.

== Group A ==
=== Czech Republic ===
Coach: Karel Rada

The squad was announced on 13 February 2019. On 24 February 2019, it was announced that Ivana Pižlová, Andrea Jarchovská, and Kristýna Janků replaced Barbora Votíková, Petra Divišová, and Kateřina Svitková.

| No. | Pos. | Player | Date of birth (age) | Caps | Goals | Club |
|---|---|---|---|---|---|---|
| 1 | GK | Ivana Pižlová | 13 December 1981 (aged 37) | 1 | 0 | (Football Association of the Czech Republic) Sparta Prague |
| 2 | MF | Aneta Dědinová | 9 March 1994 (aged 24) | 20 | 1 | (Football Association of the Czech Republic) Slavia Prague |
| 3 | DF | Nikola Sedláčková | 6 September 1990 (aged 28) | 26 | 0 | (Football Association of the Czech Republic) Slavia Prague |
| 4 | DF | Petra Bertholdová | 24 November 1984 (aged 34) | 68 | 3 | (Football Association of the Czech Republic) Sparta Prague |
| 5 | MF | Kateřina Bužková | 19 March 1996 (aged 22) | 11 | 0 | (Football Association of the Czech Republic) Sparta Prague |
| 6 | FW | Eva Bartoňová | 17 October 1993 (aged 25) | 46 | 3 | (Football Association of the Czech Republic) Slavia Prague |
| 7 | FW | Lucie Martínková | 19 September 1986 (aged 32) | 81 | 19 | (Football Association of the Czech Republic) Sparta Prague |
| 8 | MF | Irena Martínková | 19 November 1986 (aged 32) | 65 | 10 | (Football Association of the Czech Republic) Sparta Prague |
| 9 | FW | Lucie Voňková | 28 February 1992 (aged 26) | 49 | 12 | (German Football Association) Bayern Munich |
| 10 | MF | Kristýna Janků | 18 July 1994 (aged 24) | 15 | 0 | (Football Association of the Czech Republic) Slovácko |
| 11 | MF | Kamila Dubcová | 17 January 1999 (aged 20) | 4 | 2 | (Football Association of the Czech Republic) Slavia Prague |
| 12 | MF | Klára Cahynová | 20 December 1993 (aged 25) | 51 | 3 | (German Football Association) Turbine Potsdam |
| 13 | DF | Michaela Dubcová | 17 January 1999 (aged 20) | 2 | 0 | (Football Association of the Czech Republic) Slavia Prague |
| 14 | DF | Petra Vyštejnová | 12 November 1990 (aged 28) | 63 | 0 | (Football Association of the Czech Republic) Sparta Prague |
| 15 | MF | Antonie Stárová | 12 October 1998 (aged 20) | 10 | 1 | (United States Soccer Federation) Delaware Fightin' Blue Hens |
| 16 | GK | Barbora Růžičková | 20 April 1998 (aged 20) | 1 | 0 | (Football Association of the Czech Republic) Slovácko |
| 17 | FW | Tereza Szewieczková | 4 May 1998 (aged 20) | 12 | 2 | (Football Association of the Czech Republic) Slavia Prague |
| 18 | MF | Jitka Chlastáková | 13 October 1993 (aged 25) | 40 | 4 | (Football Association of the Czech Republic) Slavia Prague |
| 19 | DF | Simona Necidová | 20 January 1994 (aged 25) | 18 | 1 | (Football Association of the Czech Republic) Slavia Prague |
| 20 | FW | Pavlína Nepokojová | 29 January 1989 (aged 30) | 25 | 1 | (Football Association of the Czech Republic) Sparta Prague |
| 21 | FW | Andrea Jarchovská | 29 June 1993 (aged 25) | 0 | 0 | (Football Association of the Czech Republic) Slavia Prague |
| 22 | FW | Denisa Veselá | 8 January 1998 (aged 21) | 2 | 0 | (Football Association of the Czech Republic) Slavia Prague |
| 23 | GK | Alexandra Vaníčková | 15 June 1997 (aged 21) | 6 | 0 | (Football Association of the Czech Republic) Sparta Prague |

=== Finland ===
Coach: (Sweden) Anna Signeul

The squad was announced on 14 February 2019. Heidi Kollanen replaced Tia Hälinen on 20 February 2019. Iina Salmi replaced Emmi Alanen due to injury.

| No. | Pos. | Player | Date of birth (age) | Club |
|---|---|---|---|---|
| 1 | GK | Paula Myllyoja | 20 April 1984 (aged 34) | (Football Association of Finland) Åland United |
| 2 | DF | Elli Pikkujämsä | 24 October 1999 (aged 19) | (Football Association of Finland) Honka |
| 3 | DF | Tuija Hyyrynen | 10 March 1988 (aged 30) | (Italian Football Federation) Juventus |
| 4 | MF | Ria Öling | 15 September 1994 (aged 24) | (Danish Football Association) Brøndby |
| 5 | DF | Emma Koivisto | 25 September 1994 (aged 24) | (Swedish Football Association) Kopparbergs/Göteborg |
| 6 | DF | Anna Auvinen | 2 March 1987 (aged 31) | (Football Association of Finland) HJK |
| 7 | FW | Adelina Engman | 11 October 1994 (aged 24) | (The Football Association) Chelsea |
| 8 | MF | Olga Ahtinen | 15 August 1997 (aged 21) | (Danish Football Association) Brøndby |
| 9 | FW | Juliette Kemppi | 14 May 1994 (aged 24) | (The Football Association) Bristol City |
| 10 | MF | Iina Salmi | 12 October 1994 (aged 24) | (Royal Dutch Football Association) Ajax |
| 11 | MF | Nora Heroum | 20 July 1994 (aged 24) | (Italian Football Federation) Milan |
| 12 | GK | Anna Tamminen | 30 October 1994 (aged 24) | (Football Association of Finland) Åland United |
| 13 | MF | Jenny Danielsson | 30 August 1994 (aged 24) | (Swedish Football Association) Kungsbacka |
| 14 | MF | Julia Tunturi | 25 April 1996 (aged 22) | (Swedish Football Association) Eskilstuna United |
| 15 | MF | Natalia Kuikka | 1 December 1995 (aged 23) | (Swedish Football Association) Kopparbergs/Göteborg |
| 16 | DF | Anna Westerlund | 9 April 1989 (aged 29) | (Football Association of Finland) Åland United |
| 17 | FW | Sanni Franssi | 19 March 1995 (aged 23) | (Danish Football Association) Fortuna Hjørring |
| 18 | FW | Linda Sällström | 13 July 1988 (aged 30) | (French Football Federation) Paris FC |
| 19 | FW | Kaisa Collin | 16 April 1997 (aged 21) | (Swedish Football Association) Eskilstuna United |
| 20 | MF | Eveliina Summanen | 29 May 1998 (aged 20) | (Swedish Football Association) Örebro |
| 21 | DF | Katarina Naumanen | 24 July 1995 (aged 23) | (Norwegian Football Federation) Stabæk |
| 22 | FW | Heidi Kollanen | 6 June 1997 (aged 21) | (Italian Football Federation) Tavagnacco |
| 23 | GK | Tinja-Riikka Korpela | 5 May 1986 (aged 32) | (Norwegian Football Federation) Vålerenga |

=== North Korea ===
Coach: Kim Kwang-min

| No. | Pos. | Player | Date of birth (age) | Club |
|---|---|---|---|---|
| 1 | GK | Kim Myong-sun | 6 March 1997 (aged 21) | |
| 2 | MF | Ri Un-yong | 1 September 1996 (aged 22) | |
| 3 | DF | Pak Hye-gyong | 7 November 2001 (aged 17) | |
| 5 | FW | Wi Jong-sim | 13 October 1997 (aged 21) | (DPR Korea Football Association) Kalmaegi |
| 6 | MF | Ju Hyo-sim | 21 June 1998 (aged 20) | |
| 8 | MF | Yu Jong-im | 6 December 1993 (aged 25) | |
| 9 | MF | Pak Kyong-mi | 8 April 1993 (aged 25) | |
| 10 | FW | Ri Hae-yon | 10 January 1999 (aged 20) | |
| 11 | MF | Kim Phyong-hwa | 28 November 1996 (aged 22) | |
| 12 | FW | Kim Yun-mi | 1 July 1993 (aged 25) | (DPR Korea Football Association) April 25 |
| 14 | MF | Ri Hyang-sim | 23 March 1996 (aged 22) | |
| 15 | DF | Kim Nam-hui | 4 March 1994 (aged 24) | (DPR Korea Football Association) April 25 |
| 16 | DF | Ri Pom-hyang | 15 March 1998 (aged 20) | (DPR Korea Football Association) Pyongyang |
| 17 | DF | Ryang Ryong-mi | 20 June 1998 (aged 20) | |
| 18 | GK | Rim Yong-hwa | 20 January 1996 (aged 23) | |
| 19 | MF | Jon Yun-so | | |
| 24 | MF | Jon Gyong-un | | |
| 29 | GK | Kim Yong-sun | 2 March 1998 (aged 20) | |

=== South Africa ===
Coach: Desiree Ellis

The squad was announced on 4 February 2019.

| No. | Pos. | Player | Date of birth (age) | Club |
|---|---|---|---|---|
| 1 | GK | Victoria Muroa | 4 July 1990 (aged 28) | (South African Football Association) First Touch Academy |
| 2 | DF | Lebogang Ramalepe | 3 December 1991 (aged 27) | (South African Football Association) Ma-Indies |
| 3 | DF | Nothando Vilakazi | 28 October 1988 (aged 30) | (South African Football Association) Palace Super Falcons |
| 4 | DF | Noko Matlou | 30 September 1985 (aged 33) | (South African Football Association) Ma-Indies |
| 5 | DF | Janine van Wyk (captain) | 17 April 1987 (aged 31) | Unattached |
| 6 | MF | Mamello Makhabane | 24 February 1988 (aged 31) | (South African Football Association) JVW |
| 7 | DF | Koketso Tlailane | 7 December 1992 (aged 26) | (South African Football Association) TUT-PTA |
| 8 | DF | Karabo Dhlamini | 18 September 2001 (aged 17) | (South African Football Association) Mamelodi Sundowns |
| 9 | FW | Amanda Mthandi | 23 May 1996 (aged 22) | (South African Football Association) University of Johannesburg |
| 10 | MF | Linda Motlhalo | 1 July 1998 (aged 20) | (United States Soccer Federation) Houston Dash |
| 11 | FW | Thembi Kgatlana | 2 May 1996 (aged 22) | (United States Soccer Federation) Houston Dash |
| 12 | FW | Jermaine Seoposenwe | 12 October 1993 (aged 25) | (South African Football Association) JVW |
| 13 | DF | Bambanani Mbane | 12 March 1990 (aged 28) | (South African Football Association) Bloemfontein Celtic |
| 14 | DF | Tiisetso Makhubela | 24 April 1997 (aged 21) | (South African Football Association) Mamelodi Sundowns |
| 15 | MF | Refiloe Jane (vice-captain) | 4 August 1992 (aged 26) | (Football Australia) Canberra United |
| 16 | GK | Andile Dlamini | 2 September 1992 (aged 26) | (South African Football Association) Mamelodi Sundowns |
| 17 | MF | Leandra Smeda | 22 July 1989 (aged 29) | (Swedish Football Association) Vittsjö |
| 18 | MF | Nompumelelo Nyandeni | 19 August 1987 (aged 31) | (South African Football Association) JVW |
| 19 | MF | Kholosa Biyana | 6 September 1994 (aged 24) | (South African Football Association) University of KwaZulu-Natal |
| 20 | GK | Kaylin Swart | 30 September 1994 (aged 24) | Unattached |
| 21 | MF | Busisiwe Ndimeni | 25 June 1991 (aged 27) | (South African Football Association) TUT-PTA |
| 22 | FW | Rhoda Mulaudzi | 2 December 1989 (aged 29) | (Football Australia) Canberra United |
| 23 | MF | Molatelo Sebata | 24 August 1988 (aged 30) | (South African Football Association) First Touch Academy |

== Group B ==
=== Hungary ===
Coach: Edina Markó

The squad was announced on 26 February 2019.

| No. | Pos. | Player | Date of birth (age) | Club |
|---|---|---|---|---|
| 1 | GK | Réka Szőcs | 19 November 1989 (aged 29) | (Hungarian Football Federation) MTK Hungária |
| 2 | DF | Anita Pinczi | 14 November 1993 (aged 25) | (Hungarian Football Federation) MTK Hungária |
| 3 | MF | Henrietta Csiszár | 15 May 1994 (aged 24) | (German Football Association) Bayer Leverkusen |
| 4 | DF | Alexandra Tóth | 29 January 1991 (aged 28) | (Hungarian Football Federation) Haladás-Viktória |
| 5 | MF | Anna Csiki | 14 November 1999 (aged 19) | (Hungarian Football Federation) Ferencváros |
| 6 | MF | Evelin Fenyvesi | 7 November 1996 (aged 22) | (Hungarian Football Federation) Ferencváros |
| 7 | FW | Loretta Németh | 9 December 1995 (aged 23) | (Cyprus Football Association) Apollon Ladies |
| 8 | DF | Viktória Szabó | 26 May 1997 (aged 21) | (Hungarian Football Federation) Ferencváros |
| 9 | DF | Barbara Tóth | 11 February 1993 (aged 26) | (Hungarian Football Federation) MTK Hungária |
| 10 | FW | Fanny Vágó | 23 July 1991 (aged 27) | (Austrian Football Association) St. Pölten |
| 11 | DF | Dóra Papp | 5 January 1991 (aged 28) | (Hungarian Football Federation) MTK Hungária |
| 12 | GK | Barbara Bíró | 11 May 1995 (aged 23) | (Hungarian Football Federation) Haladás-Viktória |
| 13 | FW | Zsanett Jakabfi | 8 February 1990 (aged 29) | (German Football Association) Vfl Wolfsburg |
| 14 | DF | Evelin Mosdóczi | 26 October 1994 (aged 24) | (Hungarian Football Federation) Ferencváros |
| 15 | MF | Zsófia Rácz | 28 December 1988 (aged 30) | (Hungarian Football Federation) Haladás-Viktória |
| 16 | MF | Diána Csányi | 20 March 1998 (aged 20) | (Hungarian Football Federation) MTK Hungária |
| 17 | MF | Petra Kocsán | 4 June 1998 (aged 20) | (Hungarian Football Federation) Ferencváros |
| 18 | DF | Szabina Tálosi | 20 January 1989 (aged 30) | (Hungarian Football Federation) Haladás-Viktória |
| 19 | MF | Dóra Zeller | 6 January 1995 (aged 24) | (German Football Association) 1899 Hoffenheim |
| 20 | DF | Lilla Turányi | 20 December 1998 (aged 20) | (Hungarian Football Federation) MTK Hungária |
| 21 | FW | Stella Kiss | 11 September 1999 (aged 19) | (United States Soccer Federation) Auburn Tigers |
| 22 | GK | Anna Samu | 5 November 1996 (aged 22) | (Hungarian Football Federation) Ferencváros |
| 23 | MF | Zsanett Kaján | 16 September 1997 (aged 21) | (United States Soccer Federation) St. John's Red Storm |
| 24 | FW | Bernadett Zágor | 31 January 1990 (aged 29) | (Austrian Football Association) St. Pölten |

=== Italy ===
Coach: Milena Bertolini

The squad was announced on 18 February 2019.

| No. | Pos. | Player | Date of birth (age) | Club |
|---|---|---|---|---|
| 1 | GK | Laura Giuliani | 5 June 1993 (aged 25) | (Italian Football Federation) Juventus |
| 2 | MF | Valentina Bergamaschi | 22 January 1997 (aged 22) | (Italian Football Federation) Milan |
| 3 | DF | Sara Gama | 27 March 1989 (aged 29) | (Italian Football Federation) Juventus |
| 4 | DF | Laura Fusetti | 8 October 1990 (aged 28) | (Italian Football Federation) Milan |
| 5 | DF | Elena Linari | 15 April 1994 (aged 24) | (Royal Spanish Football Federation) Atlético Madrid |
| 6 | MF | Greta Adami | 30 July 1992 (aged 26) | (Italian Football Federation) Fiorentina |
| 7 | DF | Alia Guagni | 1 October 1987 (aged 31) | (Italian Football Federation) Fiorentina |
| 8 | MF | Manuela Giugliano | 18 August 1997 (aged 21) | (Italian Football Federation) Milan |
| 9 | FW | Daniela Sabatino | 26 June 1985 (aged 33) | (Italian Football Federation) Milan |
| 10 | FW | Cristiana Girelli | 23 April 1990 (aged 28) | (Italian Football Federation) Juventus |
| 11 | FW | Ilaria Mauro | 22 May 1988 (aged 30) | (Italian Football Federation) Fiorentina |
| 12 | GK | Chiara Marchitelli | 4 May 1985 (aged 33) | (Italian Football Federation) Florentia |
| 13 | DF | Elisa Bartoli | 7 May 1991 (aged 27) | (Italian Football Federation) Roma |
| 14 | DF | Giulia Bursi | 4 April 1996 (aged 22) | (Italian Football Federation) Sassuolo |
| 15 | FW | Valentina Giacinti | 2 January 1994 (aged 25) | (Italian Football Federation) Milan |
| 16 | FW | Stefania Tarenzi | 29 February 1988 (aged 30) | (Italian Football Federation) ChievoVerona Valpo |
| 17 | DF | Lisa Boattin | 3 May 1997 (aged 21) | (Italian Football Federation) Juventus |
| 18 | MF | Barbara Bonansea | 13 June 1991 (aged 27) | (Italian Football Federation) Juventus |
| 19 | MF | Aurora Galli | 13 December 1996 (aged 22) | (Italian Football Federation) Juventus |
| 20 | MF | Lisa Alborghetti | 19 June 1993 (aged 25) | (Italian Football Federation) Milan |
| 21 | MF | Valentina Cernoia | 22 June 1991 (aged 27) | (Italian Football Federation) Juventus |
| 22 | GK | Rosalia Pipitone | 3 August 1985 (aged 33) | (Italian Football Federation) Roma |
| 23 | DF | Cecilia Salvai | 2 December 1993 (aged 25) | (Italian Football Federation) Juventus |
| 24 | MF | Annamaria Serturini | 13 May 1998 (aged 20) | (Italian Football Federation) Roma |
| 25 | MF | Agnese Bonfantini | 4 July 1999 (aged 19) | (Italian Football Federation) Roma |

=== Mexico ===
Coach: Christopher Cuéllar

A preliminary squad was named on 11 January 2019. The final squad was announced on 14 February 2019.

| No. | Pos. | Player | Date of birth (age) | Club |
|---|---|---|---|---|
| 1 | GK | Cecilia Santiago | 19 October 1994 (aged 24) | (Mexican Football Federation) América |
| 2 | DF | Kenti Robles | 15 February 1991 (aged 28) | (Royal Spanish Football Federation) Atlético Madrid |
| 3 | DF | Bianca Sierra | 25 June 1992 (aged 26) | (Football Association of Iceland) Þór/KA |
| 4 | DF | Rebeca Bernal | 31 August 1997 (aged 21) | (Mexican Football Federation) Monterrey |
| 5 | DF | Jimena López | 30 January 1999 (aged 20) | (United States Soccer Federation) Texas A&M Aggies |
| 6 | MF | Karla Nieto | 9 January 1995 (aged 24) | (Mexican Football Federation) Pachuca |
| 7 | MF | Nayeli Rangel | 28 February 1992 (aged 26) | (Mexican Football Federation) Tigres UANL |
| 8 | MF | Joana Robles | 26 July 1994 (aged 24) | (Mexican Football Federation) Atlas |
| 9 | FW | Charlyn Corral | 11 September 1991 (aged 27) | (Royal Spanish Football Federation) Levante |
| 10 | MF | Stephany Mayor | 23 September 1991 (aged 27) | (Football Association of Iceland) Þór/KA |
| 11 | MF | Mónica Ocampo | 4 January 1987 (aged 32) | (Mexican Football Federation) Pachuca |
| 12 | GK | Alejandría Godínez | 24 February 1994 (aged 25) | (Mexican Football Federation) Pachuca |
| 13 | DF | Arianna Romero | 29 July 1992 (aged 26) | (Football Association of Iceland) Valur |
| 14 | FW | Adriana Iturbide | 27 March 1993 (aged 25) | (Mexican Football Federation) Atlas |
| 15 | DF | Kimberly Rodríguez | 26 March 1999 (aged 19) | (United States Soccer Federation) Oklahoma State Cowgirls |
| 16 | MF | Alexia Delgado | 9 December 1999 (aged 19) | (United States Soccer Federation) Arizona State Sun Devils |
| 17 | MF | Lizbeth Ovalle | 19 October 1999 (aged 19) | (Mexican Football Federation) Tigres UANL |
| 18 | FW | Kiana Palacios | 1 October 1996 (aged 22) | (Royal Spanish Football Federation) Real Sociedad |
| 19 | MF | Daniela Espinosa | 13 July 1999 (aged 19) | (Mexican Football Federation) América |
| 20 | FW | Katty Martínez | 14 March 1998 (aged 20) | (Mexican Football Federation) Tigres UANL |

=== Thailand ===
Coach: Nuengrutai Srathongvian

The squad was announced on 23 February 2019.

| No. | Pos. | Player | Date of birth (age) | Club |
|---|---|---|---|---|
| 1 | GK | Yada Sengyong | 10 September 1993 (aged 25) | (Football Association of Thailand) North Bangkok College |
| 2 | DF | Kanjanaporn Saenkhun | 18 July 1996 (aged 22) | (Football Association of Thailand) Bundit Asia |
| 3 | DF | Natthakarn Chinwong | 15 March 1992 (aged 26) | (Football Association of Thailand) Bundit Asia |
| 4 | DF | Duangnapa Sritala | 4 February 1986 (aged 33) | (Football Association of Thailand) Bangkok |
| 5 | DF | Ainon Phancha | 26 January 1992 (aged 27) | (Football Association of Thailand) Chonburi Sriprathum |
| 6 | MF | Pikul Khueanpet | 20 September 1988 (aged 30) | (Football Association of Thailand) Bundit Asia |
| 7 | MF | Silawan Intamee | 22 January 1994 (aged 25) | (Football Association of Thailand) Chonburi Sriprathum |
| 8 | FW | Suchawadee Nildhamrong | 1 April 1997 (aged 21) | Unattached |
| 9 | DF | Warunee Phetwiset | 13 December 1990 (aged 28) | (Football Association of Thailand) Chonburi Sriprathum |
| 10 | DF | Sunisa Srangthaisong | 6 May 1988 (aged 30) | (Football Association of Thailand) Bundit Asia |
| 11 | DF | Sudarat Chuchuen | 19 June 1997 (aged 21) | (Football Association of Thailand) Sisaket |
| 12 | MF | Rattikan Thongsombut | 7 July 1991 (aged 27) | (Football Association of Thailand) Bundit Asia |
| 13 | MF | Orathai Srimanee | 12 June 1988 (aged 30) | (Football Association of Thailand) Bundit Asia |
| 14 | FW | Saowalak Pengngam | 30 November 1996 (aged 22) | (Football Association of Thailand) Chonburi Sriprathum |
| 15 | MF | Nipawan Panyosuk | 15 March 1995 (aged 23) | (Football Association of Thailand) Chonburi Sriprathum |
| 16 | DF | Khwanrudi Saengchan | 16 May 1991 (aged 27) | (Football Association of Thailand) Bundit Asia |
| 17 | FW | Taneekarn Dangda | 15 December 1992 (aged 26) | (Football Association of Thailand) Bangkok |
| 18 | GK | Sukanya Chor Charoenying | 24 November 1987 (aged 31) | (Football Association of Thailand) Air Force United |
| 19 | FW | Pitsamai Sornsai | 19 January 1989 (aged 30) | (Football Association of Thailand) Chonburi Sriprathum |
| 20 | MF | Wilaiporn Boothduang | 25 June 1987 (aged 31) | (Football Association of Thailand) Bangkok |
| 21 | MF | Kanjana Sungngoen | 21 September 1986 (aged 32) | (Football Association of Thailand) Bangkok |
| 22 | GK | Nattaruja Muthtanawech | 21 August 1996 (aged 22) | |
| 23 | FW | Kanyanat Chetthabutr | 24 September 1999 (aged 19) | |
| 24 | GK | Tiffany Sornpao | 22 May 1998 (aged 20) | (United States Soccer Federation) Kennesaw State Owls |

== Group C ==
=== Austria ===
Coach: Dominik Thalhammer

The squad was announced on 12 February 2019.

| No. | Pos. | Player | Date of birth (age) | Caps | Goals | Club |
|---|---|---|---|---|---|---|
| 1 | GK | Manuela Zinsberger | 19 October 1995 (aged 23) | 49 | 0 | (German Football Association) Bayern Munich |
| 2 | DF | Sabrina Horvat | 3 July 1997 (aged 21) | 0 | 0 | (German Football Association) Werder Bremen |
| 3 | DF | Yvonne Weilharter | 8 December 2000 (aged 18) | 2 | 0 | (Austrian Football Association) Sturm Graz |
| 4 | FW | Viktoria Pinther | 16 October 1998 (aged 20) | 21 | 1 | (German Football Association) SC Sand |
| 5 | MF | Celina Degen | 16 May 2001 (aged 17) | 0 | 0 | (Austrian Football Association) Sturm Graz |
| 6 | DF | Katharina Schiechtl | 27 February 1993 (aged 26) | 42 | 6 | (German Football Association) Werder Bremen |
| 7 | DF | Carina Wenninger | 6 February 1991 (aged 28) | 85 | 4 | (German Football Association) Bayern Munich |
| 8 | MF | Nadine Prohaska | 15 August 1990 (aged 28) | 88 | 7 | (German Football Association) SC Sand |
| 9 | MF | Sarah Zadrazil | 19 February 1993 (aged 26) | 64 | 8 | (German Football Association) Turbine Potsdam |
| 10 | FW | Nina Burger | 27 December 1987 (aged 31) | 106 | 52 | (German Football Association) SC Sand |
| 11 | MF | Julia Hickelsberger-Füller | 1 August 1999 (aged 19) | 0 | 0 | (Austrian Football Association) St. Pölten |
| 12 | DF | Laura Wienroither | 13 January 1999 (aged 20) | 1 | 0 | (German Football Association) 1899 Hoffenheim |
| 13 | DF | Virginia Kirchberger | 25 May 1993 (aged 25) | 64 | 1 | (German Football Association) SC Freiburg |
| 14 | MF | Barbara Dunst | 25 September 1997 (aged 21) | 22 | 0 | (German Football Association) MSV Duisburg |
| 15 | FW | Nicole Billa | 5 March 1996 (aged 22) | 48 | 18 | (German Football Association) 1899 Hoffenheim |
| 16 | MF | Jasmin Eder | 8 October 1992 (aged 26) | 40 | 1 | (Austrian Football Association) St. Pölten |
| 17 | MF | Sarah Puntigam | 13 October 1992 (aged 26) | 89 | 13 | (French Football Federation) Montpellier |
| 18 | MF | Laura Feiersinger | 5 April 1993 (aged 25) | 67 | 11 | (German Football Association) 1. FFC Frankfurt |
| 19 | DF | Verena Aschauer | 20 January 1994 (aged 25) | 59 | 7 | (German Football Association) 1. FFC Frankfurt |
| 20 | FW | Elisabeth Mayr | 18 January 1996 (aged 23) | 0 | 0 | (German Football Association) Bayer Leverkusen |
| 21 | GK | Andrea Gurtner | 1 February 2001 (aged 18) | 0 | 0 | (Austrian Football Association) Altenmarkt |
| 22 | MF | Jennifer Klein | 11 January 1999 (aged 20) | 8 | 0 | (German Football Association) 1899 Hoffenheim |
| 23 | GK | Melissa Abiral | 18 July 1994 (aged 24) | 0 | 0 | (Austrian Football Association) St. Pölten |

=== Belgium ===
Coach: Ives Serneels

The squad was announced on 17 February 2019.

| No. | Pos. | Player | Date of birth (age) | Club |
|---|---|---|---|---|
| 1 | GK | Justien Odeurs | 30 May 1997 (aged 21) | (Royal Belgian Football Association) Anderlecht |
| 2 | DF | Davina Philtjens | 26 February 1989 (aged 30) | (Italian Football Federation) Fiorentina |
| 3 | FW | Ella Van Kerkhoven | 20 November 1993 (aged 25) | (Royal Belgian Football Association) Anderlecht |
| 4 | DF | Heleen Jaques | 20 April 1988 (aged 30) | (Italian Football Federation) Fiorentina |
| 5 | DF | Shari Van Belle | 22 December 1999 (aged 19) | (Royal Belgian Football Association) Gent |
| 6 | MF | Marie Minnaert | 5 May 1999 (aged 19) | (Royal Belgian Football Association) Gent |
| 7 | FW | Lola Wajnblum | 22 January 1996 (aged 23) | (Royal Belgian Football Association) Standard Liège |
| 8 | MF | Lenie Onzia | 30 May 1989 (aged 29) | (Royal Belgian Football Association) Gent |
| 9 | FW | Tessa Wullaert | 19 March 1993 (aged 25) | (The Football Association) Manchester City |
| 10 | MF | Zandy Soree | 1 August 1998 (aged 20) | (United States Soccer Federation) UCF Knights |
| 11 | FW | Janice Cayman | 12 October 1988 (aged 30) | (French Football Federation) Montpellier |
| 12 | GK | Lisa Lichtfus | 29 December 1999 (aged 19) | (Royal Belgian Football Association) Standard Liège |
| 13 | FW | Elena Dhont | 27 March 1998 (aged 20) | (Royal Belgian Football Association) Gent |
| 14 | FW | Davinia Vanmechelen | 30 August 1999 (aged 19) | (Royal Dutch Football Association) PSV |
| 15 | FW | Yana Daniëls | 8 May 1992 (aged 26) | (The Football Association) Liverpool |
| 16 | DF | Jody Vangheluwe | 15 July 1997 (aged 21) | (Royal Belgian Football Association) Gent |
| 17 | DF | Maud Coutereels | 21 May 1986 (aged 32) | (French Football Federation) Lille |
| 18 | DF | Laura De Neve | 9 October 1994 (aged 24) | (Royal Belgian Football Association) Anderlecht |
| 19 | FW | Chloe Velde | 6 June 1997 (aged 21) | (Royal Belgian Football Association) Gent |
| 20 | MF | Julie Biesmans | 4 May 1994 (aged 24) | (The Football Association) Bristol City |
| 21 | GK | Nicky Evrard | 26 May 1995 (aged 23) | (Royal Dutch Football Association) Twente |
| 22 | DF | Laura Deloose | 18 June 1993 (aged 25) | (Royal Belgian Football Association) Anderlecht |
| 23 | MF | Kassandra Missipo | 3 February 1998 (aged 21) | (Royal Belgian Football Association) Gent |
| 24 | DF | Silke Vanwynsberghe | 25 April 1997 (aged 21) | (Austrian Football Association) St. Pölten |

=== Nigeria ===
Coach: (Sweden) Thomas Dennerby

The squad was announced on 24 February 2019.

| No. | Pos. | Player | Date of birth (age) | Club |
|---|---|---|---|---|
| 1 | GK | Tochukwu Oluehi | 2 May 1987 (aged 31) | (Nigeria Football Federation) Rivers Angels |
| 2 | DF | Glory Ogbonna | 25 December 1998 (aged 20) | (Nigeria Football Federation) Ibom Angels |
| 3 | DF | Osinachi Ohale | 21 December 1991 (aged 27) | (Swedish Football Association) Växjö |
| 4 | DF | Ngozi Ebere | 5 August 1991 (aged 27) | (Norwegian Football Federation) Arna-Bjørnar |
| 5 | DF | Onome Ebi | 8 May 1983 (aged 35) | (Chinese Football Association) Henan Huishang |
| 6 | DF | Josephine Chukwunonye | 19 March 1992 (aged 26) | (Swedish Football Association) Asarum |
| 7 | FW | Anam Imo | 30 November 2000 (aged 18) | (Nigeria Football Federation) Nasarawa Amazons |
| 8 | FW | Asisat Oshoala | 9 October 1994 (aged 24) | (Royal Spanish Football Federation) Barcelona |
| 9 | FW | Uchenna Kanu | 20 June 1997 (aged 21) | (United States Soccer Federation) Southeastern Fire |
| 10 | MF | Rita Chikwelu | 6 March 1988 (aged 30) | (Swedish Football Association) Kristianstad |
| 11 | FW | Chinaza Uchendu | 3 December 1997 (aged 21) | (Portuguese Football Federation) Braga |
| 12 | MF | Amarachi Okoronkwo | 12 December 1992 (aged 26) | (Nigeria Football Federation) Nasarawa Amazons |
| 13 | MF | Ngozi Okobi-Okeoghene | 14 December 1993 (aged 25) | (Swedish Football Association) Eskilstuna United |
| 14 | DF | Faith Michael | 28 February 1987 (aged 31) | (Swedish Football Association) Piteå |
| 15 | FW | Rasheedat Ajibade | 8 December 1999 (aged 19) | (Norwegian Football Federation) Avaldsnes |
| 16 | GK | Chiamaka Nnadozie | 8 December 2000 (aged 18) | (Nigeria Football Federation) Rivers Angels |
| 17 | FW | Francisca Ordega | 19 October 1993 (aged 25) | (United States Soccer Federation) Washington Spirit |
| 18 | MF | Halimatu Ayinde | 16 May 1995 (aged 23) | (Swedish Football Association) Eskilstuna United |
| 19 | FW | Chinwendu Ihezuo | 30 April 1997 (aged 21) | (Kazakhstan Football Federation) BIIK Kazygurt |
| 20 | FW | Ini-Abasi Umotong | 15 May 1994 (aged 24) | (The Football Association) Brighton & Hove Albion |
| 21 | GK | Christy Ohiaeriaku | 13 December 1996 (aged 22) | (Nigeria Football Federation) Delta Queens |
| 22 | FW | Alice Ogebe | 30 March 1995 (aged 23) | (Nigeria Football Federation) Rivers Angels |
| 23 | MF | Cecilia Nku | 26 October 1992 (aged 26) | (Nigeria Football Federation) Rivers Angels |
| 24 | FW | Desire Oparanozie | 17 December 1993 (aged 25) | (French Football Federation) Guingamp |

=== Slovakia ===
Coach: Peter Kopúň

The squad was announced on 11 February 2019. Jana Maslová was replaced by Monika Havranová before the beginning of the tournament.

| No. | Pos. | Player | Date of birth (age) | Club |
|---|---|---|---|---|
| 1 | GK | Lucia El-Dahaibiová | 22 January 1989 (aged 30) | (Austrian Football Association) Landhaus Wien |
| 2 | DF | Lucia Haršányová | 27 August 1990 (aged 28) | (Italian Football Federation) Verona |
| 3 | DF | Terézia Kulová | 2 April 1997 (aged 21) | (Slovak Football Association) Slovan Bratislava |
| 4 | DF | Monika Havranová | 4 April 1999 (aged 19) | (Slovak Football Association) Partizán Bardejov |
| 5 | DF | Alexandra Bíróová | 13 July 1991 (aged 27) | (Austrian Football Association) St. Pölten |
| 6 | MF | Valentína Šušolová | 1 November 1995 (aged 23) | (Football Association of the Czech Republic) Slovan Liberec |
| 7 | DF | Patrícia Fischerová | 26 August 1993 (aged 25) | (Polish Football Association) Czarni Sosnowiec |
| 8 | MF | Klaudia Fabová | 12 September 1998 (aged 20) | (Polish Football Association) Wałbrzych |
| 9 | MF | Lenka Kopčová | 3 November 1999 (aged 19) | (Football Association of the Czech Republic) Slovan Liberec |
| 10 | MF | Lucia Ondrušová | 10 May 1988 (aged 30) | (Italian Football Federation) Verona |
| 11 | MF | Patrícia Hmírová | 30 November 1993 (aged 25) | (Polish Football Association) Czarni Sosnowiec |
| 12 | GK | Mária Korenčiová | 27 April 1989 (aged 29) | (Italian Football Federation) Milan |
| 13 | MF | Kristína Košíková | 20 December 1993 (aged 25) | (Football Association of the Czech Republic) Dukla Prague |
| 14 | DF | Petra Zdechovanová | 2 November 1995 (aged 23) | (Polish Football Association) Mitech Żywiec |
| 15 | DF | Michaela Moťovská | 24 September 1997 (aged 21) | (Football Association of the Czech Republic) Sparta Prague |
| 16 | FW | Diana Bartovičová | 20 May 1993 (aged 25) | (Football Association of the Czech Republic) Slavia Prague |
| 17 | MF | Mária Mikolajová | 13 June 1999 (aged 19) | (Football Association of the Czech Republic) Sparta Prague |
| 18 | MF | Dominika Škorvánková | 21 August 1991 (aged 27) | (German Football Association) Bayern Munich |
| 19 | DF | Jana Vojteková | 12 August 1991 (aged 27) | (German Football Association) SC Sand |
| 20 | DF | Andrea Horváthová | 5 October 1995 (aged 23) | (Polish Football Association) Czarni Sosnowiec |
| 21 | MF | Martina Šurnovská | 10 February 1999 (aged 20) | (Cyprus Football Association) Apollon Ladies |
| 22 | FW | Veronika Sluková | 15 December 1998 (aged 20) | (Austrian Football Association) Horn |
| 23 | GK | Patrícia Chládeková | 4 April 1997 (aged 21) | (German Football Association) 1. FC Saarbrücken |

== Player representation ==
=== By club ===
Clubs with 5 or more players represented are listed.

| Players | Club |
|---|---|
| 11 | (Czech Republic) Slavia Prague |
| 10 | (Czech Republic) Sparta Prague |
| 9 | (Italy) Juventus |
| 8 | (Italy) Milan |
| 7 | (Austria) St. Pölten, (Belgium) Gent, (Thailand) Bundit Asia |
| 6 | (Hungary) Ferencváros, (Hungary) MTK Hungária, (Thailand) Chonburi Sriprathum |
| 5 | (Italy) Fiorentina |

=== By club nationality ===
| Players | Clubs |
|---|---|
| 32 | Italy |
| 26 | Czech Republic |
| 24 | Germany |
| 20 | Thailand |
| 16 | Hungary, South Africa |
| 13 | Belgium, Sweden |
| 12 | Austria, United States |
| 11 | Mexico |
| 8 | Nigeria |
| 6 | England |
| 5 | Finland, France, Poland, Spain |
| 4 | North Korea, Norway |
| 3 | Denmark, Iceland, Netherlands |
| 2 | Australia, Cyprus, Slovakia |
| 1 | China, Kazakhstan, Portugal |

=== By club federation ===
| Players | Federation |
|---|---|
| 181 | UEFA |
| 27 | AFC |
| 24 | CAF |
| 23 | CONCACAF |

=== By representatives of domestic league ===
| National squad | Players |
|---|---|
| Italy | 24 |
| Czech Republic | 20 |
| Thailand | 20 |
| Hungary | 16 |
| South Africa | 16 |
| Belgium | 13 |
| Mexico | 11 |
| Nigeria | 8 |
| Austria | 6 |
| Finland | 5 |
| North Korea | 4 |
| Slovakia | 2 |
