= Vanessa Fischer =

Vanessa Fischer may refer to:

- Vanessa Fischer (footballer, born 1997), German footballer
- Vanessa Fischer (footballer, born 1998), German footballer
