= Mariella El Sherif =

Austrian footballer (born 2004)

Personal information
- Full name: El Sherif with Austria in 2026
- Date of birth: 2 September 2004 (age 22)
- Place of birth: Hartberg, Austria
- Height: 1.69 m (5 ft 7 in)
- Position: Goalkeeper

Team information
- Current team: Werder Bremen
- Number: 39

Youth career
- 2010–2015: TSV Hartberg
- 2015–2019: Sturm Graz

Senior career*
Years	Team	Apps	(Gls)
2018–2022	Sturm Graz II	19	(0)
2019–2024	Sturm Graz	25	(0)
2024–2025	Carl Zeiss Jena	12	(0)
2025–	Werder Bremen	32	(0)

International career^{‡}
2019–2020	Austria U17	3	(0)
2021–2023	Austria U19	24	(0)
2023–	Austria U20	7	(0)
2025–	Austria	11	(0)
- * Club domestic league appearances and goals as of 21 November 2026 ‡ National team caps and goals as of 10 October 2026

Mariella El Sherif (born 2 September 2004) is an Austrian professional footballer who plays as a goalkeeper for Frauen-Bundesliga club Werder Bremen. She has previously played for Sturm Graz in the ÖFB Frauen Bundesliga and for German club Carl Zeiss Jena.

== Club career ==
El Sherif joined Frauen-Bundesliga club Werder Bremen from league rivals Carl Zeiss Jena in July, a month after Livia Peng had left the club for Chelsea.

== International career ==
El Sherif has played for Austrian youth national teams.

El Sherif made her debut for the senior national team on 3 June 2025 in the meaningless final group match of the Nations League in Vienna against Germany and conceded six goals, all of which came in the first half.
