= Elena Dhont =

Belgian footballer (born 1998)

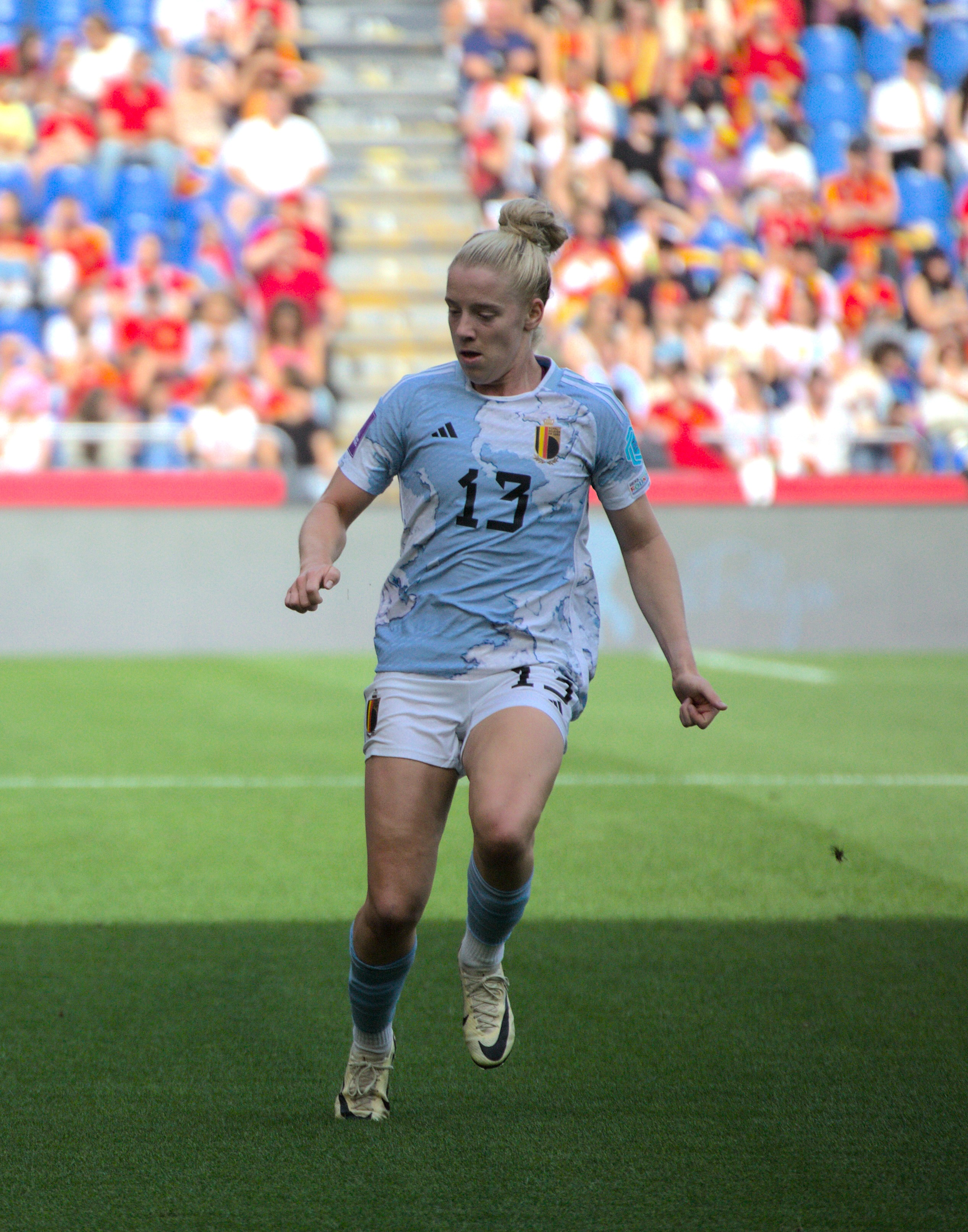
- Dhont in 2024

Personal information
- Date of birth: 27 March 1998 (age 28)
- Place of birth: Zaffelare, Belgium
- Position: Forward

Team information
- Current team: Werder Bremen
- Number: 31

Senior career*
Years	Team	Apps	(Gls)
2013–2020	Gent	40	(10)
2020–2024	Twente	38	(14)
2024–2026	Sassuolo	33	(1)
2026–	Werder Bremen	11	(2)

International career^{‡}
2013–2015	Belgium U17	10	(1)
2015–2017	Belgium U19	12	(4)
2018–	Belgium	54	(5)
- * Club domestic league appearances and goals as of 21 November 2026 ‡ National team caps and goals as of 20:15, 15 October 2026 (UTC)

Elena Dhont (born 27 March 1998) is a Belgian professional footballer who plays as a forward for Frauen-Bundesliga club Werder Bremen and the Belgium national team.

== Club career ==
Between 2013 and 2015, Dhont played for K.A.A. Gent in the BeNe League. After the dissolution of the BeNe League, she continued playing for Gent in the Belgian Women's Super League. In 2020, Dhont announced a move to Dutch Eredivisie club FC Twente. She was one of six players to leave Gent. In November 2020, Dhont broke her kneecap during a match with PSV. She was out injured for the remainder of the season. Her next appearance was for the Twente under-23s team in March 2022, and the next month, she made her first appearance for the senior team since 2020.

Dhont joined Bundesliga club Werder Bremen in July 2026.

== International career ==
Dhont has played for Belgium under-17s, Belgium under-19s, and the senior team.

In 2019, Dhont scored for Belgium in a 1–0 victory over the Republic of Ireland, and also the only goal in a 1–0 win against Nigeria at the 2019 Cyprus Women's Cup. In 2020, Dhont was selected in the squad for the Algarve Cup. She was included in the provisional 33-player squad for UEFA Women's Euro 2022, and made four appearances in the tournament.

On 11 June 2025, Dhont was called up to the Belgium squad for the UEFA Women's Euro 2025.

== Personal life ==
Dhont is from Zaffelare, Belgium. She is a Royal Belgian Football Association ambassador for women's football.

== Career statistics ==
As of match played 13 October 2026

Appearances and goals by national team and year
National team	Year	Apps	Goals
Belgium	2018	1	0
Belgium	2019	12	2
Belgium	2020	6	1
Belgium	2021	0	0
Belgium	2022	11	0
Belgium	2023	5	1
Belgium	2024	4	0
Belgium	2025	9	0
Belgium	2026	6	1
Total		54	5

Scores and results list Belgium's goal tally first, score column indicates score after each Dhont goal.

List of international goals scored by Elena Dhont
No.	Date	Venue	Opponent	Score	Result	Competition
1	20 January 2019	Pinatar Arena, San Pedro del Pinatar, Spain	Republic of Ireland	1–0	1–0	Friendly
2	4 March 2019	GSZ Stadium, Larnaca, Cyprus	Nigeria	1–0	1–0	2019 Cyprus Women's Cup
3	18 September 2020	Den Dreef, Leuven, Belgium	Romania	5–1	6–1	UEFA Women's Euro 2022 qualifying
4	22 February 2023	Ashton Gate Stadium, Bristol, England	England	1–5	1–6	2023 Arnold Clark Cup
4	9 October 2026	Den Dreef, Leuven, Belgium	Poland	1–0	1–0	2027 FIFA Women's World Cup qualification

== Honours ==
Twente

- Vrouwen Eredivisie: 2020–21, 2021–22, 2023–24
- KNVB Women's Cup: 2023
- Eredivisie Cup: 2022, 2024
- Dutch Women's Super Cup: 2023
