= Jitka Chlastáková =

Czech footballer

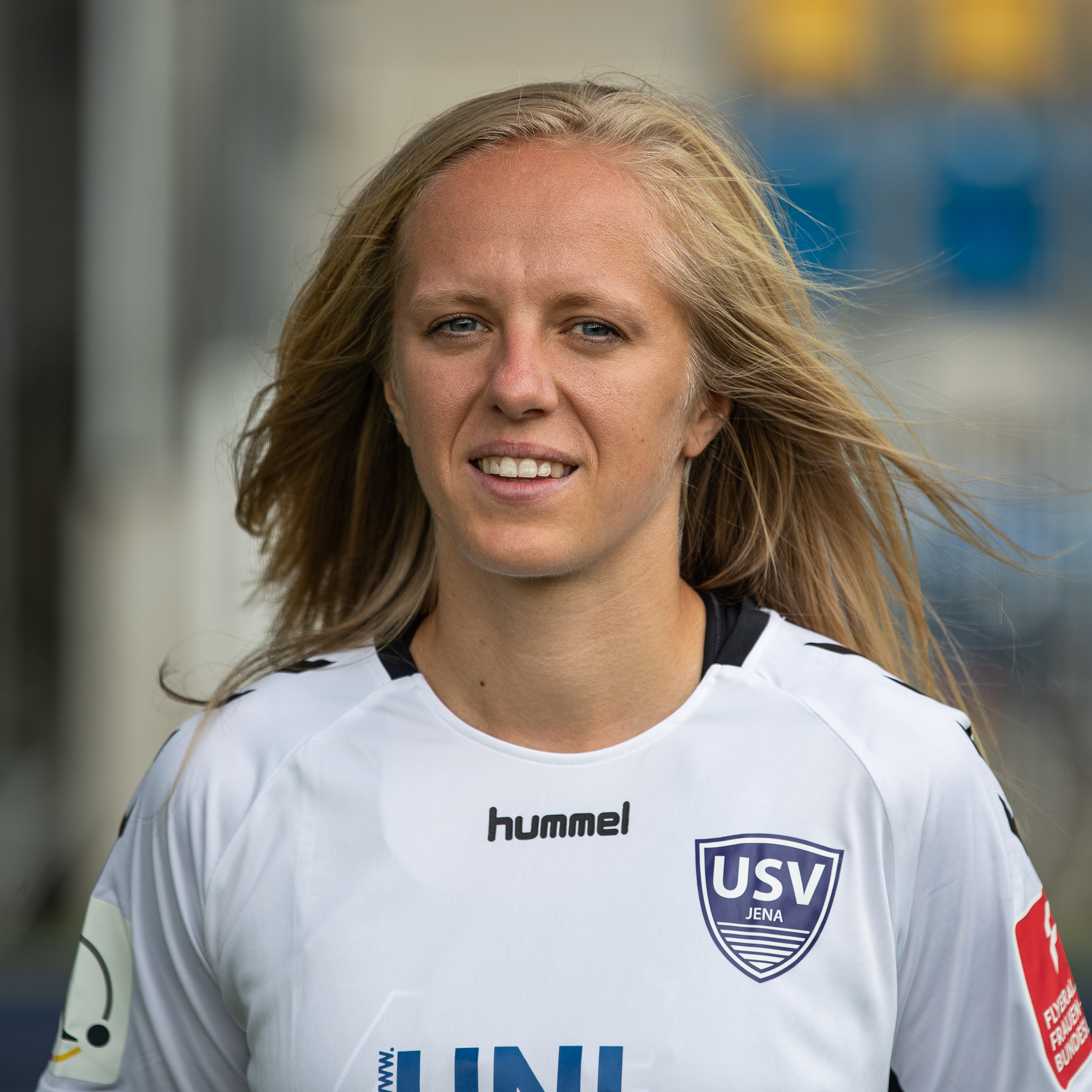
- Chlastáková with Jena in 2019

Personal information
- Date of birth: 13 October 1993 (age 33)
- Place of birth: Mělník, Czech Republic
- Height: 1.63 m (5 ft 4 in)
- Position: Midfielder

Youth career
- 2002–2004: TJ Řepín
- 2004–2007: FK Pšovka Mělník
- 2007–2008: FC Mělník
- 2008–2011: Sparta Prague

Senior career*
Years	Team	Apps	(Gls)
2011–2014	Sparta Prague		
2014	→ Bohemians Prague (loan)		
2014–2019	Slavia Prague		
2018	→ Dukla Prague (loan)	6	(1)
2019–2020	Jena	14	(2)
2020–2022	Sparta Prague		
2022–2023	Western Sydney Wanderers	7	(0)

International career^{‡}
2010–2012	Czech Republic U19	11	(0)
2012–2023	Czech Republic	56	(6)
- * Club domestic league appearances and goals ‡ National team caps and goals as of 17 August 2024

Jitka Chlastáková (born 13 October 1993) is a Czech former footballer who played as midfielder for Czech clubs Sparta Prague, Bohemians Prague, Slavia Prague, and Dukla Prague, German club Jena, and Australian club Western Sydney Wanderers. She also played internationally for the Czech Republic national team.

== Club career ==
Chlastáková played in her youth for Czech clubs TJ Řepín, Pšovka Mělník, and FC Mělník.

Chlastáková played for Sparta Prague from 2008 to 2013.

In 2014, Chlastáková played for Bohemians Prague. In 2014, Chlastáková joined Sparta Prague's rivals Slavia Prague and played there until 2019.

In 2018, Chlastáková played for Dukla Prague. During her time at the club she scored once in six appearances.

In July 2019, Chlastáková transferred to German club Jena. She played for the club in the Frauen-Bundesliga until March 2020, scoring 2 goals in 14 league appearances and making a single appearance in the DFB-Pokal Frauen.

After a year with Jena, In July 2020, Chlastáková returned to Sparta Prague as the first signing under new coach Martin Masaryk as a six-time champion of the Czech Women's First League.

In November 2022, joined Australian A-League Women club Western Sydney Wanderers for the 2022–23 A-League Women season. In October 2023, it was confirmed that she departed the club ahead of the 2023–24 A-League Women season.

== International career ==
Chlastáková represented the Czech Republic at youth level, playing 11 times for the under-19 national team from 2010 until 2012.

Chlastáková played for the Czech Republic senior national team. She made her international debut on 19 September 2012 in a match against Armenia during the Euro 2013 qualifying stage, being substituted on to replace Adéla Pivoňková in the 68th minute of the 2–0 victory.

In February 2019, Chlastáková was called up to the Czech Republic's squad for the 2019 Cyprus Women's Cup. She played in the 4–2 defeat to North Korea and then scored the winning goal in injury time of the 2–1 victory over Finland. She also played in the 2–1 victory over South Africa and in the fifth place game against Mexico, she scored the only goal of the 2–1 defeat.

While playing in Australia for Western Sydney Wanderers, Chlastáková was called up to the Czech Republic's squad for the 2023 Cup of Nations taking place in Australia. She played in their 4–0 defeat against Australia, but was an unused substitute in their 3–2 victory over Jamaica and 3–0 to Spain.

Chlastáková played 56 games for the senior national team and scored 6 goals.

== International goals ==
No.	Date	Venue	Opponent	Score	Result	Competition
1.	9 March 2015	Paralimni Stadium, Paralimni, Cyprus	South Africa	1–0	1–0	2015 Cyprus Women's Cup
2.	3 August 2016	Mourneview Park, Lurgan, Northern Ireland	Northern Ireland	1–0	1–1	UEFA Women's Euro 2017 qualifying
3.	21 October 2016	NTC Poprad, Poprad, Slovakia	Slovakia	1–2	2–3	Friendly
4.	8 March 2017	GSZ Stadium, Larnaca, Cyprus	Italy	1–0	2–6	2017 Cyprus Women's Cup
5.	1 March 2019	AEK Arena, Larnaca, Cyprus	Finland	2–1	2–1	2019 Cyprus Women's Cup
6.	6 March 2019	Antonis Papadopoulos Stadium, Larnaca, Cyprus	Mexico	1–1	1–2	2019 Cyprus Women's Cup

== Personal life ==
Chlastáková was born in Mělník, Czech Republic on 13 October 1993.
