= Sara Mella =

Italian footballer (born 1998)

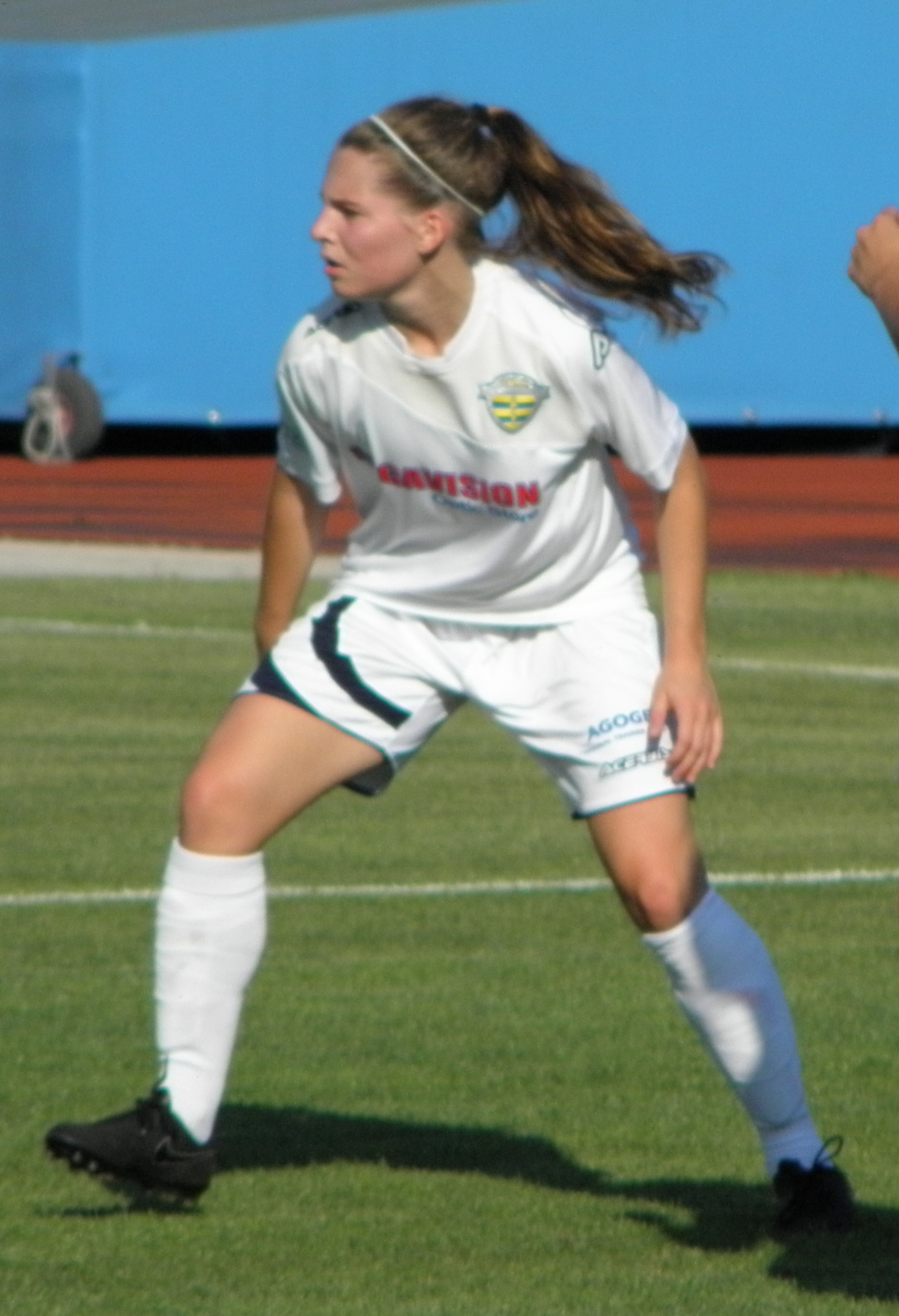

Personal information
- Date of birth: 14 April 1998 (age 28)
- Place of birth: Pordenone, Italy
- Height: 1.64 m (5 ft 5 in)
- Position: Defender

Team information
- Current team: Sassuolo
- Number: 3

Senior career*
Years	Team	Apps	(Gls)
2014–2015	Pordenone	20	(0)
2015–2016	Vittorio Veneto	20	(5)
2017–2019	Tavagnacco	36	(0)
2019–2021	Hellas Verona	35	(2)
2021–2022	Empoli	20	(0)
2022–	Sassuolo	17	(0)

International career
2013–2015	Italy U17	5	(0)
2015–2017	Italy U19	12	(2)
2018	Italy U23	1	(0)
- * Club domestic league appearances and goals

Sara Mella (born 14 April 1998) is an Italian professional footballer who plays as a defender for Italian Women's Serie A club Sassuolo.

== Career ==
Coming through the youth ranks of her home town club Pordenone, Mella made her Serie A debut as a substitute in a 7–0 away loss to eventual champions AGSM Verona (now Hellas Verona) on 1 March 2014. Pordenone finished 7th out of 16 in the league that season, but finished second-from-bottom the following campaign, including another 7–0 loss at Verona, and were relegated.

Mella left that summer to move to Vittorio Veneto, suffering relegation from Serie A at the end of 2015–16, departing at the start of 2017 to go to Tavagnacco. Two impressive seasons followed, with Tavagnacco finishing sixth in 2016–17, and third behind runaway top-two Juventus and Brescia in 2017–18.

A move to the renamed ASD Verona followed from 2019 to 2021, and for the 2021–22 season, Mella went to Empoli.

Mella moved to Sassuolo at the start of the 2022–23 season, finishing top of the relegation play-offs group and clinching sixth spot that season.

The following campaign, Mella helped Sassuolo to their joint second-best finish ever by taking fourth place in Serie A Femminile for 2023–24.

== International career ==
She has played 18 times for underage Italy sides, including one cap for the Olympic selection at under-23 level.

With the Azzurrine of the Italian Under-17 national team, she achieved third place in the 2014 European Championship in the category and third place in the World Cup in Costa Rica.

Corradini later called her up to the Under-19 team involved in the qualifications for the 2016 European Championship in Slovakia. With the U-19 team, on 17 September 2015 she made her debut in an official UEFA competition in the match won 11–0 against her peers from Cyprus, scoring the third and seventh goals of the match in the 41st and 69th minutes of the first qualifying phase. She also played two other matches in the elite phase where the Azzurrine finished only in third place in group 4, missing out on access to the final phase.

Also in the squad for the next qualifying phase for the European Championship in Northern Ireland 2017, he played all six matches of the first phase and the elite phase, with Italy managing to reach first place in group 5 and thus access the final phase after their last participation in the European Championship at home in 2011. She played all three matches in group B, finishing with two defeats and a draw in last place, thus being eliminated from the tournament.

Called up to the Under-23 team, she made her debut against the United States Under-20s, losing 3–1 on 9 April 2018.
