= Celina Degen =

Austrian footballer

Personal information
- Date of birth: 16 May 2001 (age 25)
- Place of birth: Graz, Austria
- Position: Midfielder

Team information
- Current team: 1. FC Köln
- Number: 5

Youth career
- 2006–2011: SV Fernitz
- 2011–2015: SV Gössendorf
- 2015–2020: Sturm Graz
- 2020: SV Gössendorf

Senior career*
Years	Team	Apps	(Gls)
2020–2022	Hoffenheim II	15	(2)
2020–2022	Hoffenheim	14	(1)
2022–	1. FC Köln	68	(1)

International career^{‡}
2016–2017	Austria U16	6	(1)
2016–2018	Austria U17	23	(9)
2018–2019	Austria U19	15	(2)
2019–	Austria	24	(3)
- * Club domestic league appearances and goals as of 21 November 2026 ‡ National team caps and goals as of 18 April 2026

Celina Degen (born 16 May 2001) is an Austrian professional footballer who plays as a midfielder for Frauen-Bundesliga club 1. FC Köln and the Austria national team.

== Club career ==
On the club level, she played for 1899 Hoffenheim and plays for FC Köln.

== International career ==
She competed at the 2018 UEFA Women's Under-17 Championship, 2019 UEFA Women's Under-19 Championship, 2019 Cyprus Women's Cup, 2021 Malta International Women's Football Tournament, and UEFA Women's Euro 2022.

== Career statistics ==
=== International ===
As of match played 18 April 2026

Appearances and goals by national team and year
National team	Year	Apps	Goals
Austria
Austria	2021	1	0
Austria	2022	5	1
Austria	2023	7	1
Austria	2024	7	1
Austria	2025	3	0
Austria	2026	1	0
Total		24	3

Scores and results list Austria's goal tally first, score column indicates score after each Degen goal.

List of international goals scored by Celina Degen
No.	Date	Venue	Opponent	Score	Result	Competition
1	12 April 2022	Stadion Wiener Neustadt, Wiener Neustadt, Austria	Latvia	3–0	8–0	2023 FIFA Women's World Cup qualification
2	7 April 2023	Stadion Wiener Neustadt, Wiener Neustadt, Austria	Belgium	2–2	3–2	Friendly
3	9 April 2024	Stadion Miejski w Gdyni, Gdynia, Poland	Poland	1–0	3–1	UEFA Women's Euro 2025 qualifying
