= Bianca Bardin =

Italian footballer (born 2000)

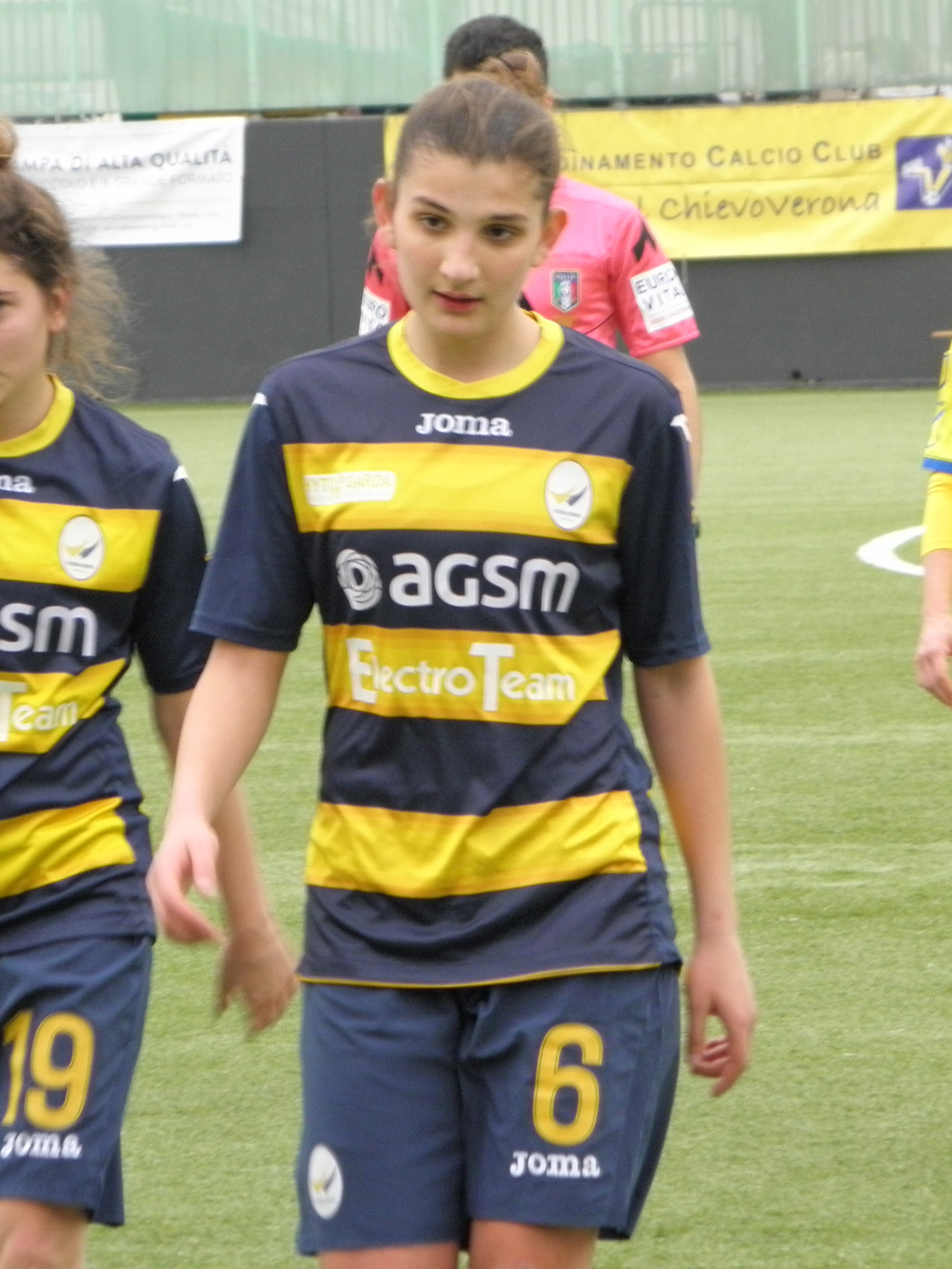

Personal information
- Full name: Bianca Giulia Bardin
- Date of birth: 7 February 2000 (age 26)
- Position: Midfielder

Team information
- Current team: Chievo Verona
- Number: 44

Senior career*
Years	Team	Apps	(Gls)
2017–2020	Hellas Verona	57	(2)
2020–2021	Florentia	17	(0)
2021–2022	Empoli	11	(2)
2022–2023	Parma	26	(2)
2024–	Chievo Verona		

International career
2017–2019	Italy U19	5	(0)
- * Club domestic league appearances and goals

Bianca Giulia Bardin (born 7 February 2000) is an Italian professional footballer who plays as a midfielder for Chievo Verona.
