= Lia Lonni =

Italian footballer (born 2000)

Personal information
- Date of birth: 17 January 2000 (age 26)
- Place of birth: Seriate, Bergamo, Italy
- Position: Goalkeeper

Team information
- Current team: Lumezzane (on loan from Sassuolo)

Senior career*
| Years | Team | Apps | (Gls) |
| 2016–2020 | Orobica | | |
| 2020–2021 | Florentia | 1 | (0) |
| 2021–2022 | Brescia | | |
| 2022– | Sassuolo | 10 | (0) |
| 2025– | → Lumezzane (loan) | 0 | (0) |
- * Club domestic league appearances and goals as of 6 August 2025

Lia Lonni (born 17 January 2000) is an Italian professional footballer who plays as a goalkeeper for Serie B club Lumezzane, on loan from Sassuolo.

== Club career ==
Born in 2000 in Seriate in the province of Bergamo, she began playing football in kindergarten, starting competitive activity at 13–14 years old with San Leone and then also playing 7-a-side football in regional CSI championships.

After returning to 11-a-side football, she joined the Orobica youth team playing in the Allieve team, in the Juniores and reaching the first team in 2016, making her debut on 27 November, as a starter in the 7th round of Serie B at home against Real Meda, drawing 2–2. After finishing the season in 5th place in the standings, the following season she became a starter and won Group B of Serie B with a 3-point advantage over Inter Milano, thus accessing the play-off for promotion to Serie A against Pro San Bonifacio, winner of Group C, and winning it 5–4 on penalties after a 1–1 draw in regulation and extra time. She made her debut in the top division on 22 September 2018, in the 1st match of the championship, on the Tavagnacco pitch, losing 1–0.

After playing for the entire beginning of her career in Orobica, in the summer of 2020 she moved away from home for the first time, going on loan to the Tuscan club Florentia.

For the 2021–2022 season she was sent on loan to Brescia, participating in the Serie B championship, where she played as a starter for the entire season.

In 2022, Lonni was signed by Serie A Femminile side Sassuolo. She was sent to Serie B club Lumezzane on a yearlong loan in August 2025.

== International career ==
Lonni was called up to the Italian youth teams of the Azzurri, but did not play in official matches. At the beginning of 2016 she was one of the first 25 players called up to the newly formed Under-16 team. In the summer of 2018 she was called up for the first time to the Under-19 team by coach Enrico Sbardella.
