= Sara Caiazzo =

Italian footballer (born 2003)

Personal information
- Date of birth: 22 April 2003 (age 23)
- Position: Defender

Team information
- Current team: Sassuolo
- Number: 5

Youth career
- –2020: Juventus

Senior career*
Years	Team	Apps	(Gls)
2020–2024	Juventus	1	(0)
2022	→ Parma (loan)	4	(0)
2023–2024	→ Pomigliano (loan)	24	(0)
2024–	Sassuolo		
- * Club domestic league appearances and goals

Sara Caiazzo (born 22 April 2003) is an Italian professional footballer who plays as a defender for Sassuolo. She previously played for Juventus, where she won three Serie A titles.

== Career ==
Sara Caiazzo was born and raised as a footballer in Naples, where in 2017, at the age of 14, she joined both the youth team and the first team of Virtus Partenope, playing in the Serie B championship at a very young age.

In the summer of 2018 she joined Napoli, in Serie C, scoring two goals during the season.

Caiazzo's footballing performances will arouse the interest of Juventus, who thus in the summer transfer session of 2019 decides to hire the defender for the Primavera team. It is with the black and white club that Sara makes her debut in Serie A, on 23 May 2021, coming on as a substitute in the 73rd minute in the 5–0 victory against Inter. She also plays two Coppa Italia matches with the first team.

In 2022, Juventus loaned Caiazzo to Parma, where the player made five appearances in the first half of the season, before being loaned back to Pomigliano for the second half of the season. She remained on loan to the Granata team for the 2023–24 season, during which she made 23 appearances, all as a starter, despite the club's relegation to Serie B.

On 12 July 2024, her permanent transfer to Sassuolo, also in Serie A, was announced.

== Honours ==
Juventus

- Serie A Femminile: 2019–2020, 2020–2021, 2021–2022
- Coppa Italia Femminile: 2022
- Supercoppa Italia: 2019, 2020, 2021
