= Florentia San Gimignano SSD =

Italian football club

Florentia San Gimignano S.S.D.
- Full name: Florentia San Gimignano Società Sportiva Dilettantistica
- Nickname(s): Le Neroverdi (The Black-greens)
- Short name: Florentia S.G.
- Founded: October 4, 2015; 9 years ago
- Dissolved: June 15, 2021; 3 years ago
- Stadium: Stadio Santa Lucia, San Gimignano
- Capacity: 1,500
- Chairman: Tommaso Becagli
- Coach: Stefano Carobbi
- League: Serie A
- 2019–2020: 5th
- Website: https://www.florentiasangimignano.it/
Home colours	Away colours

Florentia San Gimignano Società Sportiva Dilettantistica was an Italian women's association football club based in San Gimignano. It was founded in October 2015 and secured three successive promotions in its first three seasons, to enter Serie A in 2018. San Gimignano were dissolved on 15 June 2021 after selling their Serie A license to U.C. Sampdoria.

== Ground ==
Upon their entry to Serie A in 2018, Florentia negotiated an agreement to share the stadium of local male club A.S.D. Giallo-Blu Figline.

== Players ==
=== Current squad ===
As of 28 August 2020.

Note: Flags indicate national team as defined under FIFA eligibility rules; some limited exceptions apply. Players may hold more than one non-FIFA nationality.

No.	Pos.	Nation	Player
3	DF	(Italy) ITA	Paola Boglioni
4	MF	(Germany) GER	Florin Wagner
6	DF	(Italy) ITA	Serena Ceci
8	MF	(Italy) ITA	Irene Lotti
10	MF	(Sweden) SWE	Jonna Dahlberg
11	MF	(Italy) ITA	Melanie Kuenrath
12	GK	(Italy) ITA	Lia Lonni
14	DF	(Italy) ITA	Giulia Bursi

No.	Pos.	Nation	Player
16	MF	(Italy) ITA	Bianca Bardin
17	FW	(Sweden) SWE	Sara Nilsson
18	MF	(Italy) ITA	Federica Anghileri
21	MF	(Italy) ITA	Cecilia Re
22	DF	(Italy) ITA	Michela Rodella
23	DF	(Italy) ITA	Elena Pisani
28	MF	(Italy) ITA	Gaia Bolognini
32	DF	(Germany) GER	Tamar Dongus
64	GK	(Italy) ITA	Amanda Tampieri

== Honours ==
- Serie B: 2017–2018
- Serie C: 2016–2017
- Serie D: 2015–2016
