= Martina Brustia =

Italian footballer (born 1998)

Personal information
- Date of birth: 4 July 1998 (age 28)
- Place of birth: Italy
- Position: Midfielder

Team information
- Current team: Sassuolo
- Number: 8

Senior career*
Years	Team	Apps	(Gls)
2014–2018	Inter Milano	78	(4)
2018–2023	Inter Milan	61	(3)
2023–2024	Sassuolo	7	(0)
2024	Sampdoria	7	(0)
2024–	Sassuolo	9	(0)

International career
2014–2015	Italy U17	14	(0)
2015–2016	Italy U19	9	(0)
2018	Italy U23	4	(0)
- * Club domestic league appearances and goals

Martina Brustia (born 4 July 1998, Novara) is an Italian footballer, currently a midfielder with Serie A Femminile club Sassuolo.

She is the daughter of former footballer Antonio Brustia, her coach at Inter Milan in the 2014–2015 and 2015–2016 seasons and assistant coach at Inter in the 2018–2019 season.

== Career ==
Born in 1998 in Novara, she made her debut with Inter Milan at the age of 16, in the 1–1 draw at Valpolicella on 5 October 2014, the 1st matchday of Serie B, fielded from the 46th minute onwards by her father Antonio, who had become coach of the Nerazzurre after their relegation from Serie A the previous season.

She scored her first career goal on 14 December, in the 11th matchday of the championship, making the final 6–0 in the 69th minute in the home win against Pro Lissone.

In 4 seasons with the team called Inter Milano she collected 78 appearances and 4 goals, arriving twice 3rd, in group B in the 2014–2015 season and in group A in 2016, and twice 2nd, in group C in 2017, 2 points behind Valpolicella, and in group B in 2018, 3 points behind Orobica.

On 23 October 2018, the rights of Inter Milano were taken by the men's Inter Milan club, claiming the naming rights and the entire Inter squad, including Brustia. She was fielded as a starter in the first ever of the new F.C. Internazionale Milano women, on 28 October at home in Sedriano against Cittadella, 3rd round of Serie B (the first two had been played under the old name), a match won 2–0.

She scored her first goal for Inter on 13 January 2019, scoring the 2–0 in the 13th minute in the 6–0 home win against Fortitudo Mozzecane in the 11th round of the championship.

In her first season with the new club, she won Serie B with 21 wins, only 1 draw (in the 20th away to Lazio) and no defeats, obtaining promotion to Serie A. Brustia made her debut in the top flight on 14 September 2019, in the 1st round of the championship, starting in the 2–2 home draw with Verona.

At the end of January 2023, after four and a half seasons spent at Inter, she moved to Sassuolo, continuing to play in Serie A.

== International career ==
From 2014 to 2015 she played 4 official matches with the Italian U-17 team, in the qualifications for the 2015 European Championship in Iceland, the 3 victories in the first phase in September 2014 against the Faroe Islands, Greece and Norway and the only victory in the elite phase, in April 2015, against Belarus.

In October 2016 she played 1 match with the U-19 team, a 4–0 victory over Macedonia in the first phase of the qualifications for the 2017 European Championship in Northern Ireland.

At the end of 2017 she joined the recently formed U-23 national team.

At the beginning of 2018 she was called up to the senior national team by coach Milena Bertolini for a friendly against France.

== Honours ==
=== Inter Milan ===
- Campionato italiano Serie B femminile: 2018–2019
