= Paula Myllyoja =

Finnish footballer (born 1984)

Personal information
- Date of birth: 20 April 1984 (age 42)
- Place of birth: Finland,
- Position: Goalkeeper

Team information
- Current team: PAOK
- Number: 1

Senior career*
Years	Team	Apps	(Gls)
2008–2009	KMF	40	(0)
2010	FC United	15	(0)
2011–2012	FC Ilves	43	(0)
2013–2015	PK-35 Vantaa	46	(0)
2016–2018	FC Honka	64	(0)
2019	Åland United	3	(0)
2019–2021	Pink Bari	29	(0)
2021–	RCD Espanyol		

International career^{‡}
	Finland	5	(0)
- * Club domestic league appearances and goals ‡ National team caps and goals as of 10 February 2022

Paula Myllyoja (born 20 April 1984) is a Finnish footballer who plays as a goalkeeper for Serie A club A.S.D. Pink Sport Time and the Finland women's national football team. She has appeared in two matches for Finland, with one appearance each at the 2019 and 2020 Cyprus Women's Cup. She has previously played for Finnish clubs PK-35 Vantaa and Åland United.
