= Francesca Calò =

Swiss footballer (born 1995)

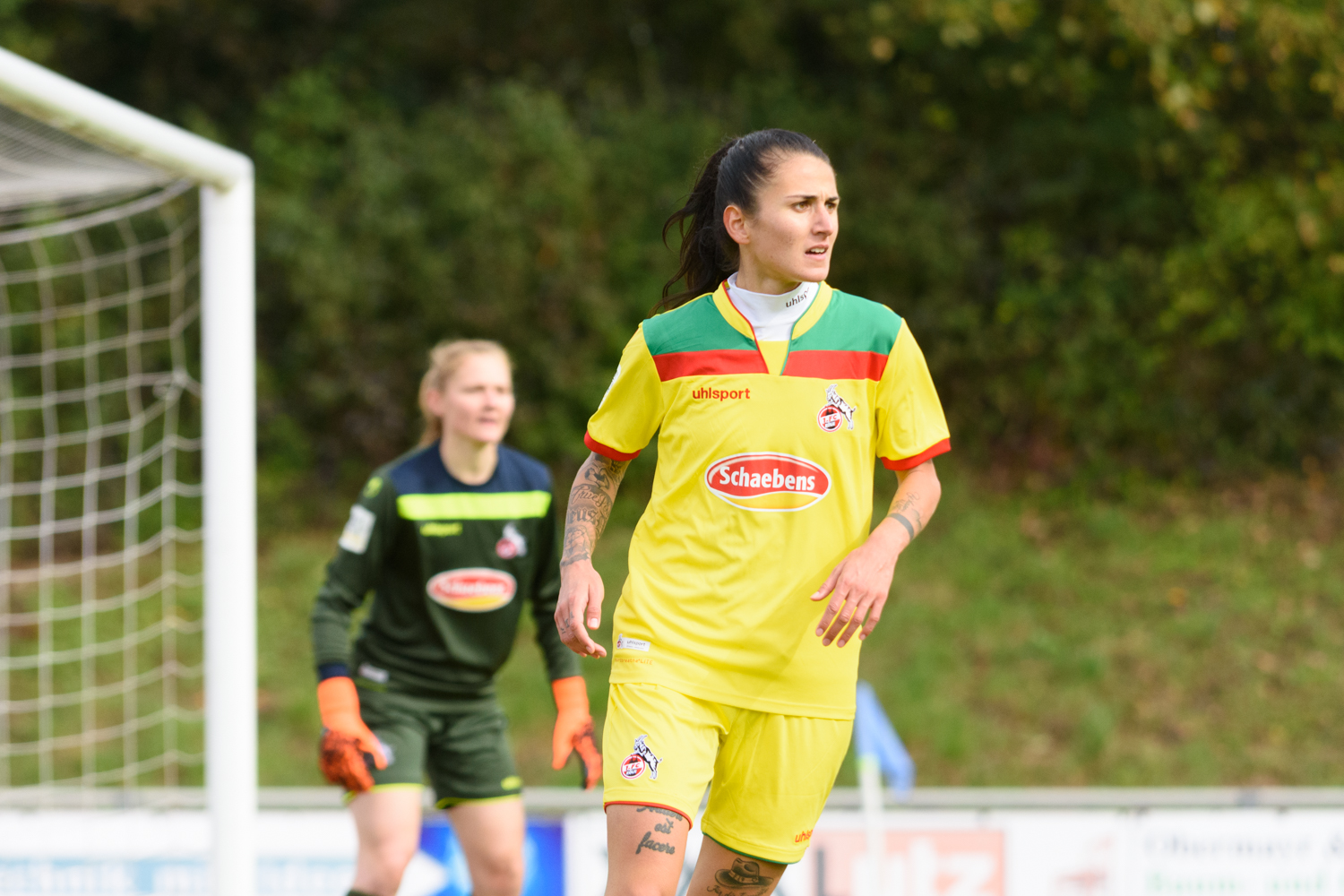
- Calò with 1. FC Köln in 2020

Personal information
- Date of birth: 25 May 1995 (age 31)
- Place of birth: Bern, Switzerland
- Height: 1.76 m (5 ft 9 in)
- Position: Right-back

Team information
- Current team: FFC Vorderland
- Number: 22

Senior career*
Years	Team	Apps	(Gls)
2012–2018	YB Frauen		
2018–2019	Werder Bremen	5	(0)
2019–2022	1. FC Köln	47	(0)
2022–	FFC Vorderland	36	(1)

International career^{‡}
2010–2012	Switzerland U17	11	(5)
2012–2014	Switzerland U19	11	(4)
2019–2020	Switzerland	5	(0)
- * Club domestic league appearances and goals as of 1 July 2021 ‡ National team caps and goals as of 27 October 2020

Francesca Calò (born 25 May 1995) is a Swiss footballer who plays as a right-back for Austrian club FFC Vorderland. She has played for the Switzerland national team.
