= 2019 Cyprus Women's Cup =

2019 Cyprus Cup
Tournament details
- Host country: Cyprus
- Dates: 27 February – 6 March
- Teams: 12 (from 4 confederations)
- Venue: 5 (in 3 host cities)

Final positions
- Champions: North Korea (1st title)
- Runners-up: Italy
- Third place: Belgium
- Fourth place: Austria

Tournament statistics
- Matches played: 24
- Goals scored: 85 (3.54 per match)
- Top scorer(s): (North Korea) Kim Yun-mi (5 goals)
- Best player: (Italy) Sara Gama

The 2019 Cyprus Cup was the twelfth edition of the Cyprus Cup, an invitational women's football tournament held annually in Cyprus. It took from 27 February to 6 March 2019.

North Korea won their first title after a final win over Italy.

== Format ==
The twelve invited teams were split into three groups to play a round-robin tournament.

Points awarded in the group stage follow the standard formula of three points for a win, one point for a draw and zero points for a loss. In the case of two teams being tied on the same number of points in a group, their head-to-head result determines the higher place.

== Venues ==
Stadium	City	Capacity
GSZ Stadium	Larnaca	13,032
AEK Arena	Larnaca	7,400
Antonis Papadopoulos Stadium	Larnaca	10,230
Tasos Markos Stadium	Paralimni	5,800
Pyla Stadium	Pyla	3,000

== Teams ==
Team	FIFA Rankings (December 2018)
North Korea	11
Italy	16
Belgium	21
Austria	23
Mexico	27
Finland	28
Thailand	29
Czech Republic	31
Nigeria	39
Hungary	43
Slovakia	45
South Africa	48

== Group stage ==
=== Group A ===
Pos	Team	Pld	W	D	L	GF	GA	GD	Pts
1	North Korea	3	3	0	0	9	3	+6	9
2	Czech Republic	3	2	0	1	6	6	0	6
3	Finland	3	0	1	2	3	5	−2	1
4	South Africa	3	0	1	2	4	8	−4	1

Source: Cypruswomenscup
Rules for classification: 1) Points; 2) Goal difference; 3) Goals scored
27 February 2019
13:00

South Africa	2–2	Finland
Smeda 70' (pen.); Kgatlana 83'	Report	Kemppi 49'; Engman 77'

GSZ Stadium, Larnaca
27 February 2019
14:30

North Korea	4–2	Czech Republic
Ju Hyo-sim 14'; Kim Yun-mi 18', 90+4'; Ri Hyang-sim 83'	Report	Bartoňová 63'; Szewieczková 85'

Pyla Stadium, Pyla

1 March 2019
13:00

Finland	1–2	Czech Republic
Ahtinen 11'	Report	Pikkujämsä 67' (o.g.); Chlastáková 90+1'

AEK Arena, Larnaca
1 March 2019
18:00

South Africa	1–4	North Korea
Ramalepe 48'	Report	Kim Yun-mi 7', 23'; Ri Hyang-sim 13', 35'

AEK Arena, Larnaca

4 March 2019
13:00

Czech Republic	2–1	South Africa
Dubcová 81', 89'	Report	Makhabane 17'

Antonis Papadopoulos Stadium, Larnaca
4 March 2019
18:00

Finland	0–1	North Korea
	Report	Jon Yun-so 45'

Antonis Papadopoulos Stadium, Larnaca

=== Group B ===
Pos	Team	Pld	W	D	L	GF	GA	GD	Pts
1	Italy	3	3	0	0	12	1	+11	9
2	Mexico	3	1	1	1	5	9	−4	4
3	Thailand	3	1	0	2	6	6	0	3
4	Hungary	3	0	1	2	3	10	−7	1

Source: Cypruswomenscup
Rules for classification: 1) Points; 2) Goal difference; 3) Goals scored
27 February 2019
13:00

Mexico	0–5	Italy
	Report	Bergamaschi 45'; Bonansea 50'; Giacinti 70', 78'; Mauro 66'

Antonis Papadopoulos Stadium, Larnaca
27 February 2019
17:00

Thailand	4–0	Hungary
Thongsombut 10', 49'; Srimanee 45+2'; Nildhamrong 86'	Report

Antonis Papadopoulos Stadium, Larnaca

1 March 2019
13:00

Thailand	1–2	Mexico
Dangda 46'	Report	Corral 3' (pen.), 82'

GSZ Stadium, Larnaca
1 March 2019
18:00

Hungary	0–3	Italy
	Report	Giacinti 18', 44'; Serturini 55'

GSZ Stadium, Larnaca
Referee: Lina Lehtovaara (Finland)

4 March 2019
13:00

Italy	4–1	Thailand
Bonansea 19'; Sabatino 54'; Galli 57'; Chinwong 89' (o.g.)	Report	Dangda 67'

AEK Arena, Larnaca
Referee: Katalin Kulcsár (Hungary)
4 March 2019
18:00

Mexico	3–3	Hungary
Corral 29' (pen.); Iturbide 54'; Espinosa 89'	Report	Zeller 19'; Jakabfi 85', 87'

AEK Arena, Larnaca

=== Group C ===
Pos	Team	Pld	W	D	L	GF	GA	GD	Pts
1	Austria	3	2	1	0	5	1	+4	7
2	Belgium	3	2	1	0	4	0	+4	7
3	Nigeria	3	1	0	2	5	8	−3	3
4	Slovakia	3	0	0	3	3	8	−5	0

Source: Cypruswomenscup
Rules for classification: 1) Points; 2) Goal difference; 3) Goals scored
27 February 2019
13:00

Belgium	3–0	Slovakia
Cayman 13', 65' (pen.); Daniëls 90+1'	Report

AEK Arena, Larnaca
27 February 2019
17:00

Nigeria	1–4	Austria
Oshoala 65'	Report	Burger 48'; Billa 59'; Feiersinger 72'; Klein 82'

AEK Arena, Larnaca

1 March 2019
13:00

Slovakia	3–4	Nigeria
Vojteková 67'; Haršányová 72' (pen.), 77' (pen.)	Report	Chikwelu 8', 38'; Ohale 28'; Imo 82'

Antonis Papadopoulos Stadium, Larnaca
1 March 2019
18:00

Austria	0–0	Belgium
	Report

Antonis Papadopoulos Stadium, Larnaca
Attendance: 30
Referee: Cheryl Foster (Wales)

4 March 2019
13:00

Slovakia	0–1	Austria
	Report	Billa 46'

GSZ Stadium, Larnaca
Attendance: 25
Referee: Lina Lehtovaara (Finland)
4 March 2019
18:00

Nigeria	0–1	Belgium
	Report	Dhont 7'

GSZ Stadium, Larnaca

=== Ranking of teams for placement matches ===
The ranking of the 1st, 2nd, and 3rd placed teams in each group to determine the placement matches:

- 1st placed teams

Pos	Grp	Team	Pld	W	D	L	GF	GA	GD	Pts	Qualification
1	B	Italy	3	3	0	0	12	1	+11	9	Final
2	A	North Korea	3	3	0	0	9	3	+6	9	Final
3	C	Austria	3	2	1	0	5	1	+4	7	Third-place match

Source: Cypruswomenscup
- 2nd placed teams

Pos	Grp	Team	Pld	W	D	L	GF	GA	GD	Pts	Qualification
1	C	Belgium	3	2	1	0	4	0	+4	7	Third-place match
2	A	Czech Republic	3	2	0	1	6	6	0	6	Fifth-place match
3	B	Mexico	3	1	1	1	5	9	−4	4	Fifth-place match

Source: Cypruswomenscup
- 3rd placed teams

Pos	Grp	Team	Pld	W	D	L	GF	GA	GD	Pts	Qualification
1	B	Thailand	3	1	0	2	6	6	0	3	Seventh-place match
2	C	Nigeria	3	1	0	2	5	8	−3	3	Seventh-place match
3	A	Finland	3	0	1	2	3	5	−2	1	Ninth-place match

Source: Cypruswomenscup
- 4th placed teams

Pos	Grp	Team	Pld	W	D	L	GF	GA	GD	Pts	Qualification
1	A	South Africa	3	0	1	2	4	8	−4	1	Ninth-place match
2	B	Hungary	3	0	1	2	3	10	−7	1	Eleventh-place match
3	C	Slovakia	3	0	0	3	3	8	−5	0	Eleventh-place match

Source: Cypruswomenscup

== Final stage ==
=== Eleventh place game ===
6 March 2019
11:00

Slovakia	2–3	Hungary
Vojteková 27'; Ondrušová 41'	Report	Németh 30'; Pinczi 35'; Jakabfi 53'

Antonis Papadopoulos Stadium, Larnaca

=== Ninth place game ===
6 March 2019
11:00

Finland	3–0	South Africa
Naumanen 31'; Salmi 51'; Ahtinen 88'	Report

Tasos Markos Stadium, Paralimni

=== Seventh place game ===
6 March 2019
15:00

Nigeria	3–0	Thailand
Oshoala 23'; Ebi 28'; Imo 74'

Tasos Markos Stadium, Paralimni

=== Fifth place game ===
6 March 2019
15:00

Czech Republic	1–2	Mexico
Chlastáková 48'	Report	Ovalle 34'; Bertholdová 54' (o.g.)

Antonis Papadopoulos Stadium, Larnaca

=== Third place game ===
6 March 2019
14:00

Austria	0–0	Belgium
	Report
Penalties
Mayr (penalty missed); Feiersinger (penalty scored); Aschauer (penalty missed); Puntigam (penalty scored); Prohaska (penalty missed)	2–3	(penalty scored) Jaques; (penalty missed) Cayman; (penalty scored) Coutereels; (penalty scored) Wullaert; (penalty missed) Evrard

GSZ Stadium, Larnaca
Attendance: 30
Referee: Jana Adámková (Czech Republic)

=== Final ===
6 March 2019
18:00

North Korea	3–3 (a.e.t.)	Italy
Kim Yun-mi 38'; Ju Hyo-sim 45+1'; Yon So-jon 106'	Report	Girelli 19'; Sabatino 79'; Cernoia 111'
Penalties
Yon So-jon (penalty scored); Kim Yun-mi (penalty scored); Ju Hyo-sim (penalty scored); Pak Sin-jong (penalty scored); Pak Kyong-mi (penalty scored); Ri Pom-hyang (penalty scored); Ri Un-yong (penalty scored)	7–6	(penalty scored) Giugliano; (penalty scored) Girelli; (penalty scored) Serturini; (penalty scored) Cernoia; (penalty scored) Sabatino; (penalty scored) Salvai; (penalty missed) Bonansea

GSZ Stadium, Larnaca
Referee: Riem Hussein (Germany)

== Final standings ==
Rank	Team
1st place, gold medalist(s)	North Korea
2nd place, silver medalist(s)	Italy
3rd place, bronze medalist(s)	Belgium
4	Austria
5	Mexico
6	Czech Republic
7	Nigeria
8	Thailand
9	Finland
10	South Africa
11	Hungary
12	Slovakia

== Goalscorers ==
There were 85 goals scored in 24 matches, for an average of 3.54 goals per match.

5 goals

- (North Korea) Kim Yun-mi

4 goals

- (Italy) Valentina Giacinti

3 goals

- (Hungary) Zsanett Jakabfi
- (Mexico) Charlyn Corral
- (North Korea) Ri Hyang-sim

2 goals

- (Austria) Nicole Billa
- (Belgium) Janice Cayman
- (Czech Republic) Jitka Chlastáková
- (Czech Republic) Kamila Dubcová
- (Finland) Olga Ahtinen
- (Italy) Barbara Bonansea
- (Italy) Daniela Sabatino
- (Nigeria) Rita Chikwelu
- (Nigeria) Anam Imo
- (Nigeria) Asisat Oshoala
- (North Korea) Ju Hyo-sim
- (North Korea) Yon So-jon
- (Slovakia) Lucia Haršányová
- (Slovakia) Jana Vojteková
- (Thailand) Taneekarn Dangda
- (Thailand) Rattikan Thongsombut

1 goal

- (Austria) Nina Burger
- (Austria) Laura Feiersinger
- (Austria) Jennifer Klein
- (Belgium) Yana Daniëls
- (Belgium) Elena Dhont
- (Czech Republic) Eva Bartoňová
- (Czech Republic) Tereza Szewieczková
- (Finland) Adelina Engman
- (Finland) Juliette Kemppi
- (Finland) Katarina Naumanen
- (Finland) Iina Salmi
- (Hungary) Loretta Németh
- (Hungary) Anita Pinczi
- (Hungary) Dóra Zeller
- (Italy) Valentina Bergamaschi
- (Italy) Valentina Cernoia
- (Italy) Aurora Galli
- (Italy) Cristiana Girelli
- (Italy) Ilaria Mauro
- (Italy) Annamaria Serturini
- (Mexico) Daniela Espinosa
- (Mexico) Adriana Iturbide
- (Mexico) Lizbeth Ovalle
- (Nigeria) Onome Ebi
- (Nigeria) Osinachi Ohale
- (Slovakia) Lucia Ondrušová
- (South Africa) Thembi Kgatlana
- (South Africa) Mamello Makhabane
- (South Africa) Lebogang Ramalepe
- (South Africa) Leandra Smeda
- (Thailand) Suchawadee Nildhamrong
- (Thailand) Orathai Srimanee

1 own goal

- (Czech Republic) Petra Bertholdová (against Mexico)
- (Finland) Olga Ahtinen (against the Czech Republic)
- (Thailand) Natthakarn Chinwong (against Italy)
