= Livia Peng =

Swiss footballer (born 2002)

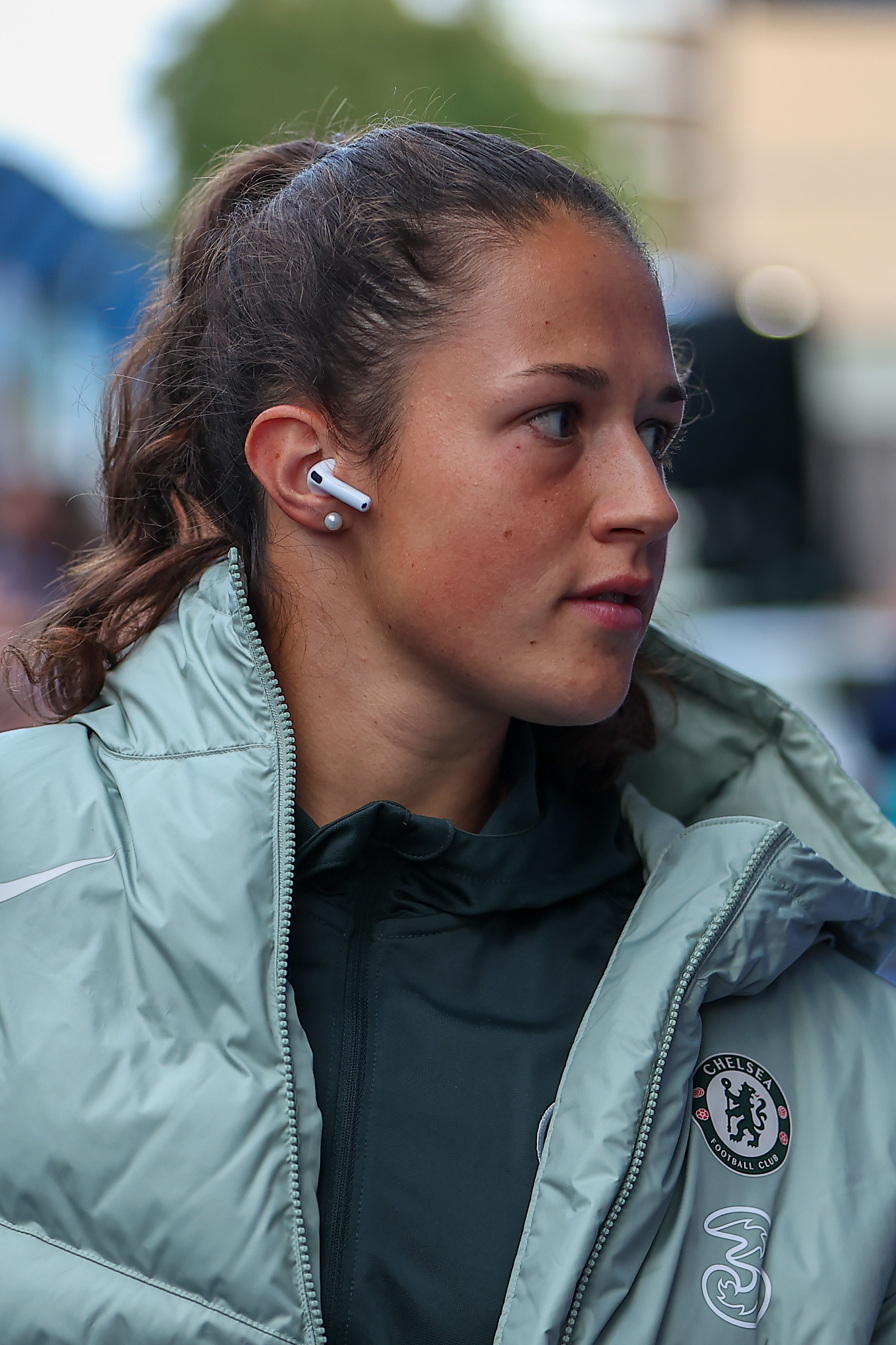
- Peng in 2025

Personal information
- Full name: Livia Maïté Peng
- Date of birth: 14 March 2002 (age 24)
- Place of birth: Chur, Switzerland
- Height: 1.74 m (5 ft 9 in)
- Position: Goalkeeper

Team information
- Current team: Chelsea
- Number: 1

Youth career
- 2009–2014: FC Ems
- 2014–2019: Team South East Switzerland

Senior career*
Years	Team	Apps	(Gls)
2019–2022	FC Zürich	67	(0)
2022–2023	BK Häcken	3	(0)
2023	→ Levante (loan)	5	(0)
2023–2025	Werder Bremen	41	(0)
2025–	Chelsea	5	(0)

International career^{‡}
2017	Switzerland U16	2	(0)
2017–2018	Switzerland U17	13	(0)
2019–2020	Switzerland U19	5	(0)
2023–	Switzerland	24	(0)
- * Club domestic league appearances and goals as of 18:31, 17 May 2026 (UTC) ‡ National team caps and goals as of 08:23, 14 October 2026 (UTC)

Livia Maïté Peng (Swiss Standard German: [ˈliːvɪ̯a ma.ite peŋ]; born 14 March 2002) is a Swiss professional footballer who plays as a goalkeeper for Women's Super League club Chelsea and the Switzerland national team. She previously played for Bundesliga club Werder Bremen, Damallsvenskan club BK Häcken FF. and for Swiss Women's Super League club FC Zürich.

== Club career ==
=== Early career ===
Starting at age seven, Peng played with FC Ems on mixed youth teams. She later joined the Southeastern Switzerland boys' team and was supported there by coach Romano Cabalzar from age 12 to 17.

=== FC Zürich ===
From July 2017 Peng was employed by FC Zürich in an all-female team for the first time. In August 2019 she was nominated as first-choice goalkeeper. As an FCZ player, Peng made six appearances in the UEFA Champions League.

=== BK Häcken ===
After a 2021–22 season with two titles, she signed a professional contract with Gothenburg club BK Häcken in Sweden's Damallsvenskan league. In her first season she made three league appearances and one cup appearance.

=== Loan to Levante ===
In January 2023, Peng was loaned to Spanish Liga F club Levante until the end of the season. She played five times.

=== Werder Bremen ===
Peng joined Bundesliga club Werder Bremen in the summer of 2023. She made her debut as a starter on the first day of the championship in the 5–1 away victory over 1. FC Nürnberg, before going on to play 20 games and keeping five clean sheets across the campaign. Peng's 2024–25 season was particularly notable, as her performances, characterised by her 1-on-1 saves and impressive build-up play, earned her a spot in Kicker's team of the season. She played 21 matches — missing a single game due to a concussion — and kept seven clean sheets, helping Bremen to finish seventh.

=== Chelsea ===
Peng in 2026

On 10 June 2025, Chelsea announced that Peng would officially join the club on 1 July 2025, with her signing a four-year deal with the club. She made her debut for the club in the Champions League on 8 October against Twente.

== International career ==
=== Youth ===
At age 15, Peng was selected for the U17 national team for 2018 U-17 European Championship qualifications. She made her debut during the first qualifying round for the subsequent 2019 U-17 European Championship, where she played in all three matches of the first phase, guaranteeing her team's passage to the next round. Until 2021 she played in various youth national teams.

The following year Peng was in the squad with the U19 national team for the first qualifying round of the 2020 U-19 European Championship. Coach Nora Häuptle used her in two of the three group stage matches. Peng did not concede a goal against Austria and Latvia, guaranteeing her team's advancement to the next round. However, due to the COVID-19 pandemic, UEFA decided to cancel the tournament before the start of the elite phase.

=== Senior ===
Peng was called up to the senior national team for the first time in November 2020, alongside Gaëlle Thalmann and Seraina Friedli as third goalkeeper. She was in the squad for the European Championship finals in England in the summer of 2022. On 11 November 2022, she was in goal during the first half of a friendly against Denmark, but that game was only counted as an unofficial friendly as more than six substitutions were made. Her official debut finally came a few months later, as a starter in the home friendly match on 21 February 2023, a 1–1 draw with Poland. She was included in the list of 23 players called up for the 2023 World Cup on 4 July of that year. Her first competitive fixture was a 0–1 loss to Italy in the 2023–24 Nations League.

For the 2025 Euros in Switzerland, Peng was chosen as the starting goalkeeper by manager Pia Sundhage.

== Honours ==
FC Zürich

- Swiss Championship: 2019, 2022
- Swiss Cup: 2019, 2022

Chelsea

- Women's League Cup: 2025–26
