= Adriana Iturbide =

Mexican footballer (born 1993)

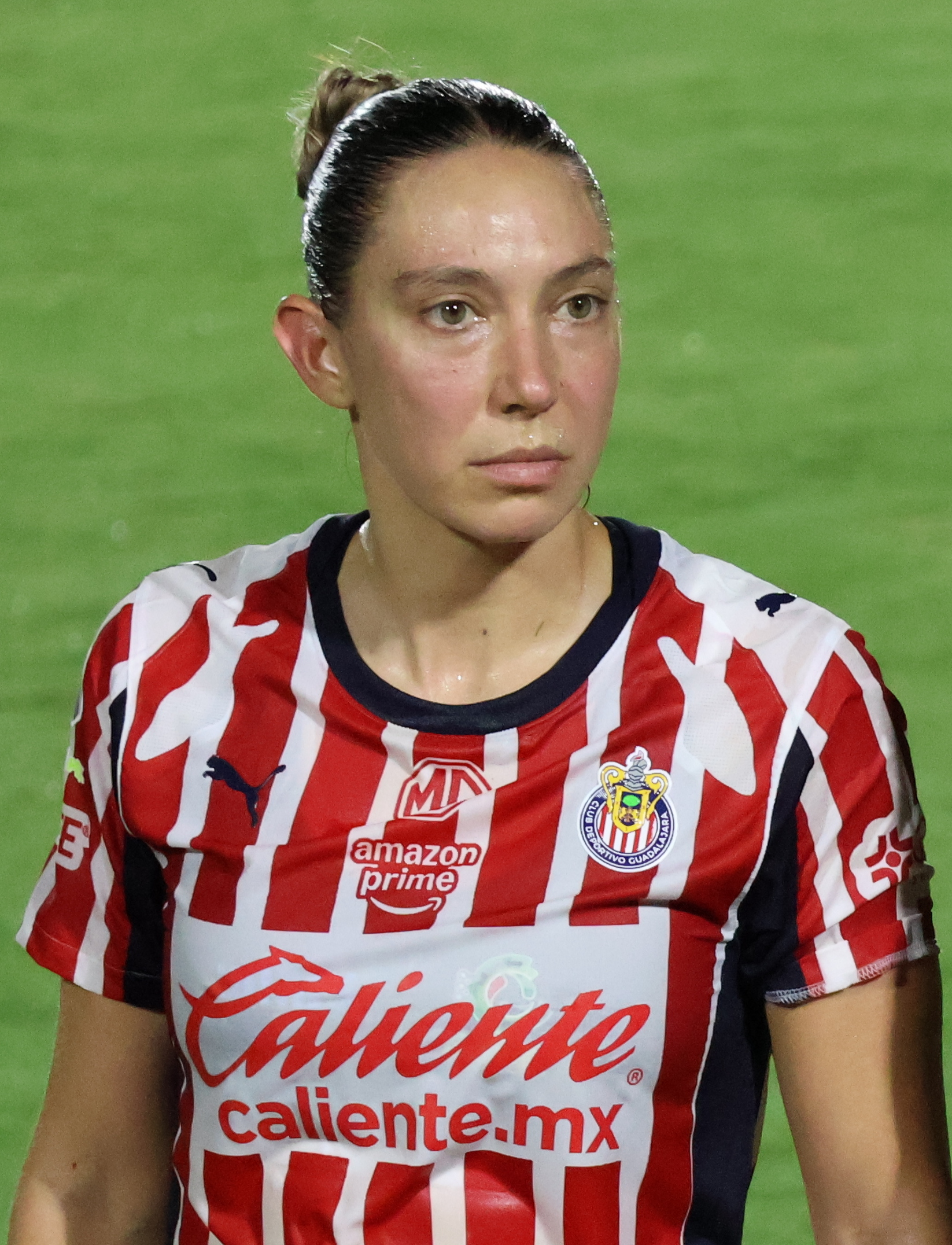
- Iturbide with Guadalajara in 2025

Personal information
- Full name: Adriana Iturbide Ibarra
- Date of birth: 27 March 1993 (age 33)
- Place of birth: Guadalajara, Jalisco, Mexico
- Height: 1.63 m (5 ft 4 in)
- Position: Forward

Team information
- Current team: Guadalajara
- Number: 10

Senior career*
Years	Team	Apps	(Gls)
2018–2022	Atlas	105	(43)
2022–	Guadalajara	113	(35)

International career^{‡}
2019–	Mexico	6	(1)
- * Club domestic league appearances and goals as of 1 February 2026 ‡ National team caps and goals as of 6 March 2019

Adriana Iturbide Ibarra (born 27 March 1993) is a Mexican professional footballer who plays as a forward for Liga MX Femenil club Guadalajara and the Mexico national team.

== International career ==
Iturbide made her senior debut for Mexico on 27 February 2019 in a friendly match against Italy.

== Career statistics ==
=== International goals ===
Scores and results list Mexico's goal tally first

No.	Date	Venue	Opponent	Score	Result	Competition
1	4 March 2019	AEK Arena, Larnaca, Cyprus	Hungary	2–1	3–3	2019 Cyprus Women's Cup
