= Sabrina Horvat =

Austrian footballer

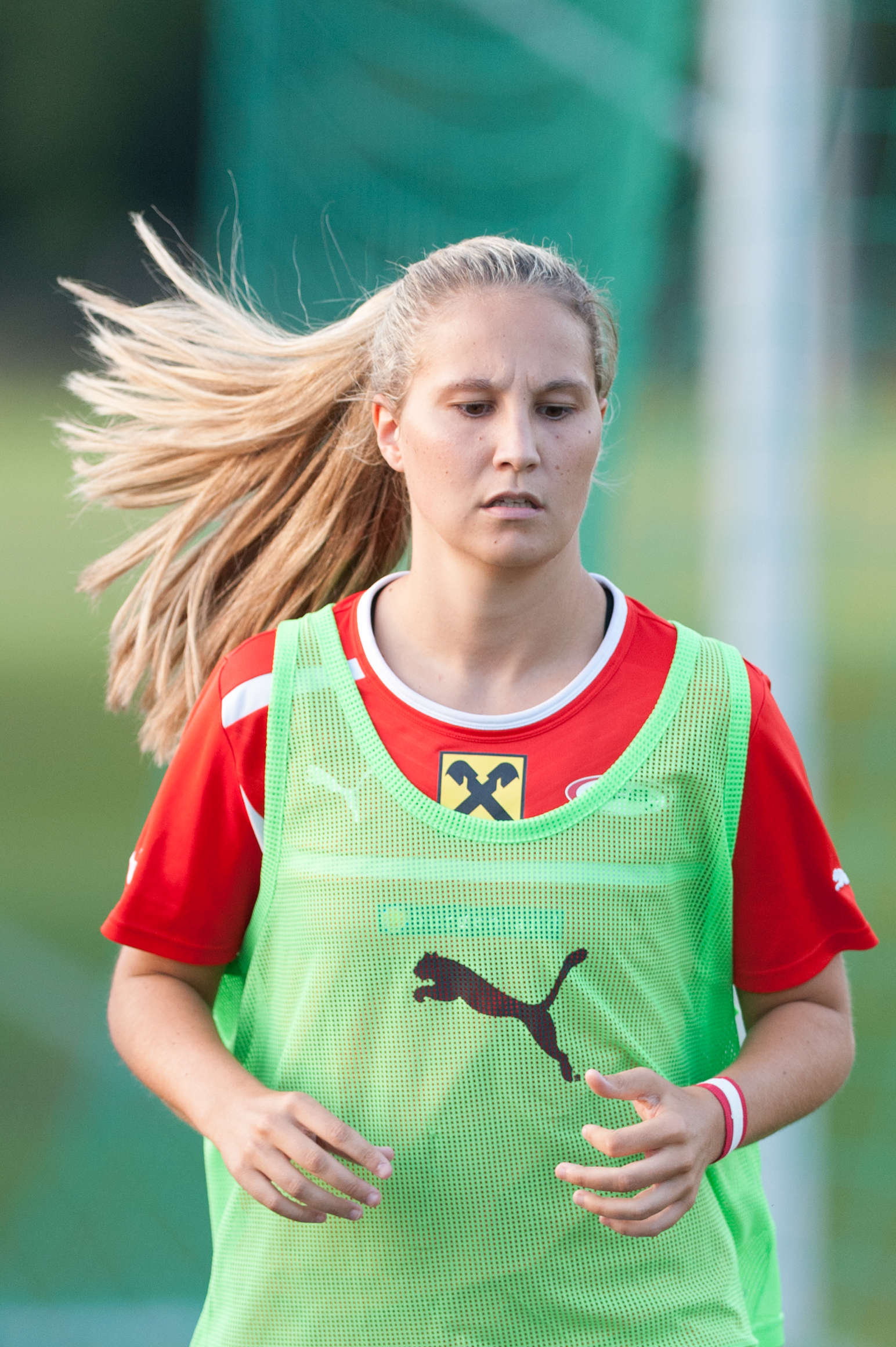
- Horvat in 2015

Personal information
- Date of birth: 3 July 1997 (age 29)
- Place of birth: Austria
- Height: 1.71 m (5 ft 7 in)
- Position: Defender

Team information
- Current team: SPG FCR Altach/FFC Vorderland
- Number: 3

Youth career
- –2012: FC Höchst

Senior career*
| Years | Team | Apps | (Gls) |
| 2012–2016 | FC Staad | 79 | (6) |
| 2016–2018 | Basel | 48 | (2) |
| 2018–2019 | Werder Bremen | 19 | (0) |
| 2019–2022 | 1. FC Köln | 55 | (2) |
| 2022– | FFC Vorderland | 18 | (0) |

International career^{‡}
| 2019– | Austria | 1 | (0) |
- * Club domestic league appearances and goals as of 29 July 2023 ‡ National team caps and goals as of 8 October 2019

Sabrina Horvat (born 3 July 1997) is an Austrian footballer who plays as a defender for German ÖFB-Frauenliga club FFC Vorderland and the Austria women's national team.

== Honours ==
Basel

- Swiss Super League; runner-up: 2017/18

Köln

- 2. Frauen-Bundesliga (1): 2020/21

Vorderland

- ÖFB Cup; runner-up: 2022/23
