= Vanessa Fischer (footballer, born 1997) =

German footballer (born 1997)

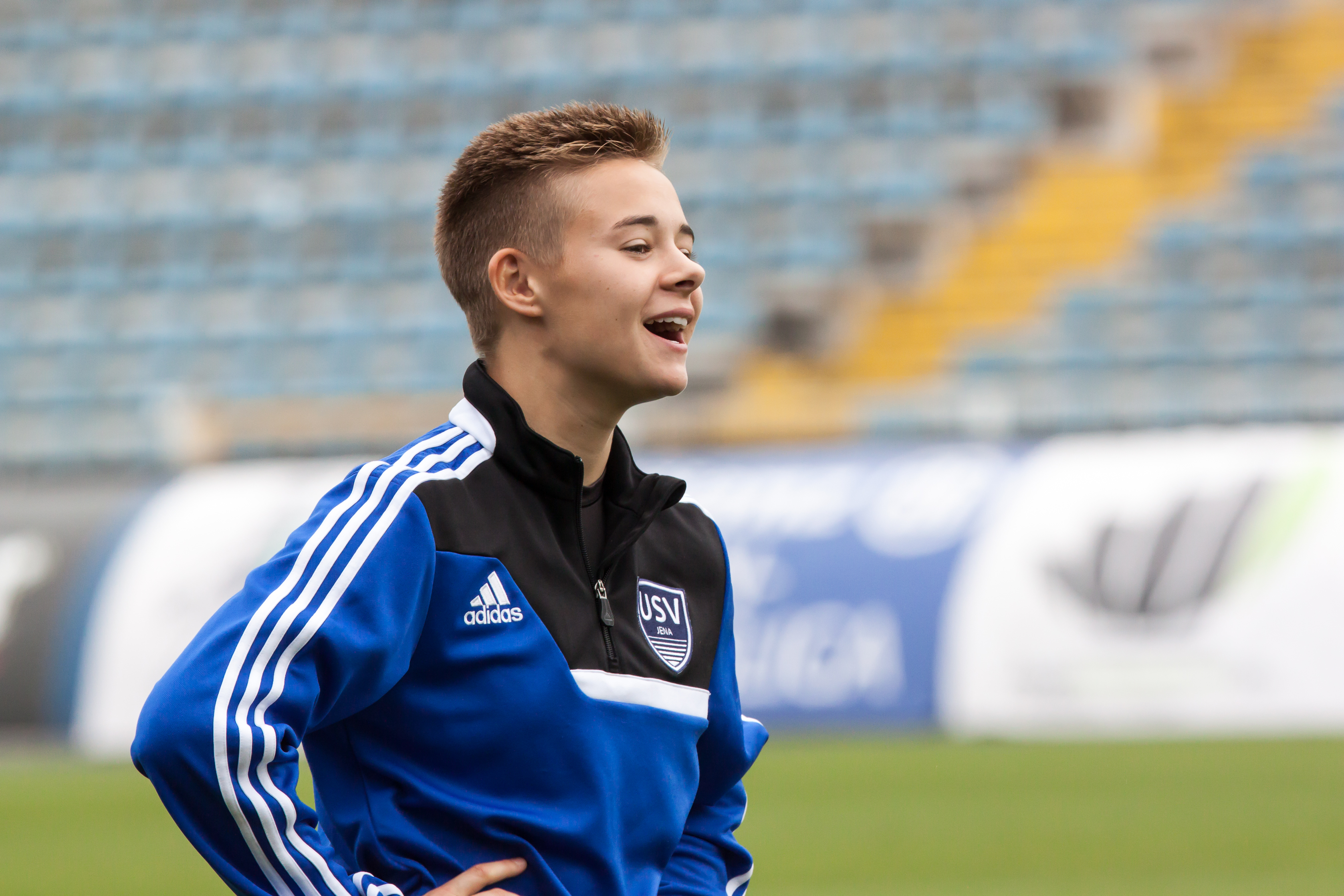
- Fischer in 2014

Personal information
- Date of birth: 24 April 1997 (age 29)
- Height: 1.68 m (5 ft 6 in)
- Position: Goalkeeper

Senior career*
Years	Team	Apps	(Gls)
2014–2016	FF USV Jena	1	(0)
2016–2017	VfL Sindelfingen	22	(0)
2017–2020	BV Cloppenburg	44	(0)
2020	Borussia Bocholt	2	(0)
2021–2023	SV Meppen	13	(0)
- * Club domestic league appearances and goals

Vanessa Fischer (born 24 April 1997) is a German former footballer who played as a goalkeeper. In 2023 she retired from football.
