= SV Werder Bremen (women) =

Women's football team in Bremen, Germany

Werder Bremen
- Full name: Sportverein Werder Bremen von 1899 e. V.
- Nickname: Die Werderaner (The River Islanders)
- Founded: 2007; 19 years ago
- Ground: Weserstadion Platz 11; Bremen
- Capacity: 5,500
- President: Hubertus Hess-Grunewald
- Coach: Friederike Kromp
- League: Bundesliga
- 2025–26: Bundesliga, 6th of 14
- Website: https://www.werder.de/teams/frauen/start-center/
Home colours	Away colours	Third colours

SV Werder Bremen Frauen is a German women's football club based in Bremen. In 2014–15 they were promoted to the Bundesliga, the top tier of German football.

== History ==
Already in the early 1970s a women's team played for the German Championship, but was dissolved some years later.

Recreated in 2007, Werder Bremen reached the second national category two years later, after topping the Regionalliga's North group. In the 2. Bundesliga's North group, Werder Bremen was 7th in 2010 and 5th in 2011 and 2012. On 27 September 2009, during the 2009–10 season, Doreen Nabwire scored the club's first goals in the 2. Bundesliga, by scoring a brace during their opening match against Hamburger SV II to push them to a 2–2 draw.

Finishing second in 2014–15 they were promoted because 1. FC Lübars, champion of the 2. Bundesliga, did not apply for a Bundesliga licence for financial reasons.

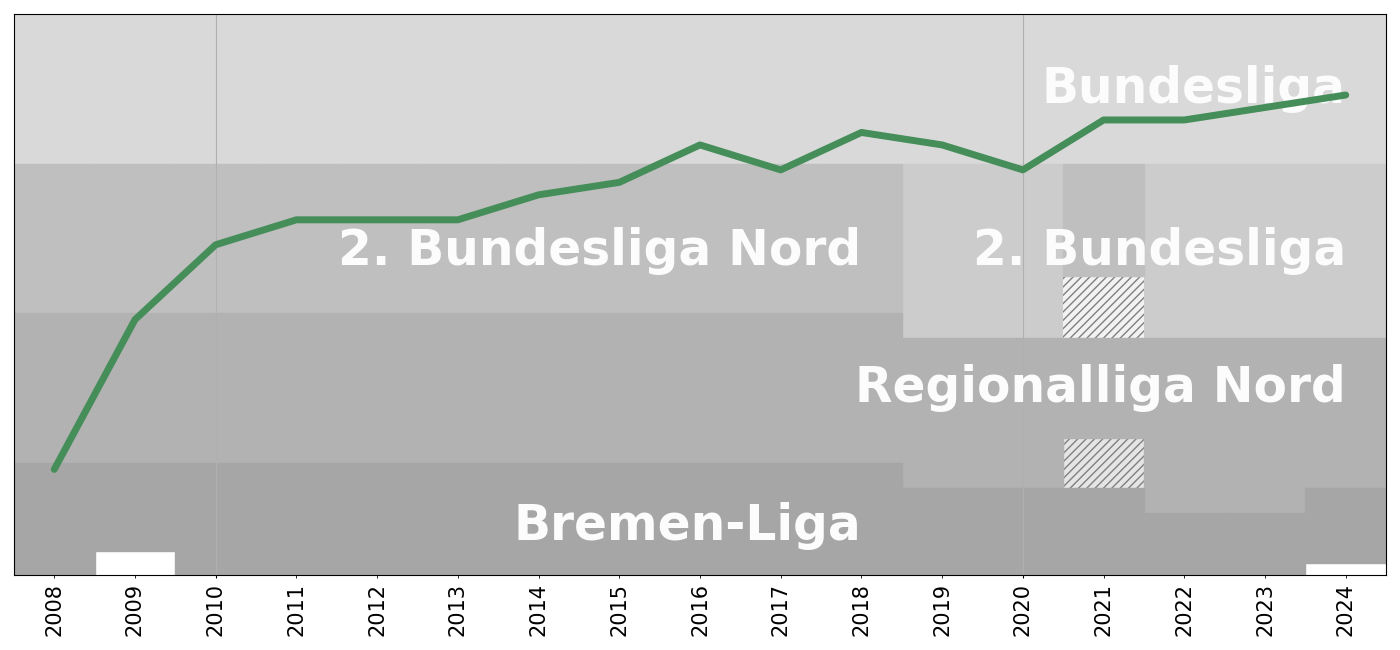
Chart of league positions at end of season

== Players ==
=== Current squad ===
As of 2 September 2026

Note: Flags indicate national team as defined under FIFA eligibility rules; some limited exceptions apply. Players may hold more than one non-FIFA nationality.

No.	Pos.	Nation	Player
1	GK	GER	Vanessa Fischer
2	DF	AUT	Chiara D'Angelo
3	DF	POL	Wiktoria Zieniewicz
4	DF	AUT	Julia Magerl
5	DF	GER	Michelle Ulbrich (captain)
6	MF	GER	Marie Gmeineder
7	FW	AUT	Lilli Purtscheller
8	FW	JPN	Mei Shimada
9	FW	MNE	Medina Dešić
10	FW	TUR	Tuana Mahmoud
11	FW	GER	Isabella Jaron
13	FW	BEL	Luna Vanzeir
14	FW	SUI	Elena Mühlemann

No.	Pos.	Nation	Player
15	DF	GER	Michelle Weiß
16	GK	GER	Thea Farwick
19	DF	GER	Felicia Sträßer
20	FW	GER	Lena Petermann
21	DF	GER	Caroline Siems
23	MF	GER	Jenny Hipp
26	FW	GER	Sarah Ernst
27	DF	AUT	Sarah Gutmann
28	MF	GER	Juliane Wirtz
30	GK	TUR	Sinem Özdemir
31	FW	BEL	Elena Dhont
33	DF	GER	Maria Penner
39	GK	AUT	Mariella El Sherif

== Former Players ==
- (Kenya) Doreen Nabwire
- (Germany) Cindy König
- (Germany) Manjou Wilde
- (Austria) Sandra Hausberger
- (Germany) Marie-Louise Eta
- (Germany) Pia-Sophie Wolter
- (Germany) Giovanna Hoffmann
- (New Zealand) Betsy Hassett
- (Germany) Nina Lührßen
- (Germany) Selina Cerci
- (Philippines) Sofia Harrison
- (Austria) Julia Kofler
- (Switzerland) Francesca Calò
- (Austria) Sabrina Horvat
- (Greece) Sofia Nati
- (Germany) Sophie Weidauer
- (Colombia) Catalina Perez
- (Switzerland) Livia Peng
- (Latvia) Sofija Ņesterova
- (Belgium) Diede Lemey
- (Hungary) Emőke Pápai
