= Vanessa Fischer (footballer, born 1998) =

German footballer (born 1998)

Personal information
- Date of birth: 18 April 1998 (age 28)
- Place of birth: Frankfurt, Germany
- Height: 1.82 m (6 ft 0 in)
- Position: Goalkeeper

Team information
- Current team: Werder Bremen
- Number: 1

Senior career*
| Years | Team | Apps | (Gls) |
| 2014–2021 | Turbine Potsdam II | 29 | (0) |
| 2015–2025 | Turbine Potsdam | 99 | (0) |
| 2025– | Werder Bremen | 5 | (0) |

International career
| 2012 | Germany U15 | 1 | (0) |
| 2014 | Germany U16 | 3 | (0) |
| 2015 | Germany U17 | 3 | (0) |
| 2015–2017 | Germany U19 | 13 | (0) |
| 2018 | Germany U20 | 5 | (0) |
- * Club domestic league appearances and goals as of 6 November 2026

Vanessa Fischer (born 18 April 1998) is a German footballer who plays as a goalkeeper for Frauen-Bundesliga club Werder Bremen.

== Career ==
In May 2025 it was announced that Fischer would leave Turbine Potsdam, who suffered relegation from the Frauen-Bundesliga at the end of the 2024–25 season, and join Werder Bremen for the following season. At Werder Bremen, she replaced the departing Catalina Pérez.
