= Katarina Naumanen =

Finnish footballer (born 1995)

Personal information
- Full name: Katarina Juli Naumanen
- Date of birth: 24 July 1995 (age 31)
- Height: 1.66 m (5 ft 5 in)
- Position: Defender

Team information
- Current team: Honka
- Number: 21

Senior career*
Years	Team	Apps	(Gls)
2011	KMF	1	(0)
2012–2015	Pallokissat	69	(7)
2016–2018	HJK	64	(1)
2019	Stabæk	6	(0)
2019	KuPS	8	(0)
2020–2021	Honka	19	(1)
2022	HJK	0	(0)

International career^{‡}
2011–2012	Finland U17	8	(0)
2012–2013	Finland U19	10	(0)
2014	Finland U20	3	(0)
2014–2019	Finland	20	(1)
- * Club domestic league appearances and goals as of 22:31, 4 October 2024 (UTC) ‡ National team caps and goals as of 12 November 2019

Katarina Juli Naumanen (born 24 July 1995) is a Finnish footballer who plays as a defender.

== Career ==
On 6 April 2016, Naumanen was announced at HJK.

Naumanen won the 2018 Aalto Athlete of the Year award due to her ability to combine sports and studies.

On 30 November 2018, Naumanen was announced at Stabæk. She scored against ØHIL in the 58th minute.

On 2 August 2019, Naumanen was announced at KuPS.

On 4 November 2019, Naumanen was announced at FC Honka.

On 19 November 2021, Naumanen was announced at HJK for the 2022 season. On 30 March 2022, it was announced that she would be focusing on rehabilitating her knee and would be focusing on a sales career.

== After football ==
In May 2022, Naumanen joined the Olympic Committee of Finland.

== International career ==
Naumanen was called up to the 2016 Cyprus Women's Cup.

Naumanen was called up to the 2018 Cyprus Women's Cup.

Naumanen was called up to the 2019 Cyprus Women's Cup. She scored her first international goal against South Africa on 6 March 2019, scoring in the 31st minute.

== Style of play ==
Whilst playing for Stabæk, Naumanen was played in the fullback position, but prefers to play as a winger.

== Personal life ==
Naumanen has dealt with mental health issues such as anxiety and depression. She wanted to speak out about it so other people would be able to. She also runs a podcast with Martin Paas called #Taloudentekijät. Naumanen has also written for a column about her everyday life as a football player.
