= US Sassuolo Calcio (women) =

Italian football club

Sassuolo
- Full name: Unione Sportiva Sassuolo Calcio S.r.l.
- Founded: 1976 (as Santa Croce); 2016 (as Sassuolo Femminile)
- Ground: Stadio Enzo Ricci, Sassuolo, Italy
- Chairwoman: Elisabetta Vignotto
- Head coach: Gian Loris Rossi
- Coach: Salvatore Colantuono
- League: Serie A
- 2024–25: Serie A, 8th of 10
- Website: http://www.sassuolofemminile.it
Home colours	Away colours	Third colours

Unione Sportiva Sassuolo Calcio Femminile, or simply Sassuolo, is an Italian women football club based in Sassuolo. It is the women’s football section of US Sassuolo. The club competes in Serie A, the professional league of the Italian football league system.

== History ==
The club was known as A.S.D. Reggiana Calcio Femminile, but plays under U.S. Sassuolo Calcio's crest and name due to sponsorship and licensing reason in 2016. A formal name change to A.S.D. Sassuolo Calcio Femminile was completed in 2017. In 2019, the "sport title" of "A.S.D. Sassuolo Calcio Femminile" was formally transferred to U.S. Sassuolo Calcio the male professional club.

== Colours ==
Sassuolo Femminile use black and green as the colors of their first team home kit. From 2016 to 2019, it used azure (Italian: azzurro).

== Players ==
=== Current squad ===
As of 10 August 2026

Note: Flags indicate national team as defined under FIFA eligibility rules; some limited exceptions apply. Players may hold more than one non-FIFA nationality.

No.	Pos.	Nation	Player
1	GK	SUI	Noemi Benz
2	DF	BEL	Davina Philtjens
3	DF	ITA	Sara Mella
4	DF	FRA	Hélène Fercocq
5	DF	ITA	Sara Caiazzo
6	MF	USA	Maya Doms
7	MF	POL	Katja Skupień
8	MF	ITA	Martina Brustia
11	MF	SLV	Samantha Fisher
12	MF	BEL	Kassandra Missipo
14	MF	SWE	Bea Sprung
15	MF	ITA	Benedetta Brignoli
17	MF	FRA	Lina Grève-Chaib
18	MF	ITA	Valentina Gallazzi

No.	Pos.	Nation	Player
19	FW	AUS	Jacynta Galabadaarachchi
21	DF	AUS	Jessika Nash
24	DF	ITA	Aurora De Rita
25	DF	ITA	Caterina Venturelli
26	FW	SCO	Lana Clelland
27	DF	ITA	Erika Santoro
29	MF	SVN	Naja Mihelič
30	MF	ITA	Manuela Perselli
33	DF	ITA	Alice Pellinghelli
46	DF	ITA	Alice Rossi
58	FW	ITA	Emma Girotto
78	GK	ITA	Francesca De Bona
90	FW	CMR	Naomi Eto (on loan from Paris Saint-Germain)
—	MF	HUN	Luca Papp
—	FW	POL	Kinga Wyrwas

=== Out on loan ===
Note: Flags indicate national team as defined under FIFA eligibility rules; some limited exceptions apply. Players may hold more than one non-FIFA nationality.

No.	Pos.	Nation	Player
1	GK	ITA	Lia Lonni (on loan to FC Lumezzane)
22	GK	ITA	Erica Di Nallo (on loan to ACF Arezzo)
93	FW	FRA	Kadidia Traoré (on loan to Standard Liège)

=== Notable players ===
- (Jamaica) Siobhan Wilson

== See also ==
- List of women's association football clubs
- List of women's football clubs in Italy
