= Giulia Bursi =

Italian footballer (born 1996)

Personal information
- Date of birth: 4 April 1996 (age 30)
- Place of birth: Reggio Emilia, Italy
- Height: 1.64 m (5 ft 5 in)
- Position: Defender

Team information
- Current team: Verona

International career
Years	Team	Apps	(Gls)
- Italy

Giulia Bursi (born 4 April 1996) is an Italian professional footballer who plays as a defender for Verona.
