= Iina Salmi =

Finnish footballer (born 1994)

Personal information
- Full name: Iina Reetta Salmi
- Date of birth: 12 October 1994 (age 32)
- Place of birth: Espoo, Finland
- Height: 1.64 m (5 ft 5 in)
- Position: Midfielder

Team information
- Current team: HJK
- Number: 7

Youth career
- EBK
- HooGee
- VJS

Senior career*
Years	Team	Apps	(Gls)
2011–2013	PK-35 Vantaa	29	(2)
2014	HJK	23	(7)
2015	PK-35 Vantaa	20	(13)
2016	FC Rosengård	17	(2)
2017	IF Limhamn Bunkeflo	8	(0)
2018	PK-35 Vantaa	11	(6)
2018–2020	Ajax	21	(2)
2020–2023	Valencia	70	(6)
2023	HJK	9	(4)

International career^{‡}
2012–2013	Finland U19		
2016–	Finland	13	(1)
- * Club domestic league appearances and goals as of 9 May 2020 ‡ National team caps and goals as of 10 February 2022

Iina Reetta Salmi (born 12 October 1994) is a Finnish professional footballer who plays as a midfielder for HJK and the Finland women's national team. She previously played for PK-35 Vantaa and HJK of the Naisten Liiga, FC Rosengård and AFC Ajax Vrouwen. Salmi made her debut for the Finland women's national team in March 2016 against Wales. She was also a member of the Finnish squad at the 2014 FIFA U-20 Women's World Cup in Canada and played at the 2013 UEFA Women's Under-19 Championship.
