= 2023–24 Czech Women's First League =

Czech football season

Czech Women's First League
- Season: 2023–24
- Champions: Slavia Prague
- Promoted: FC Praha
- Relegated: Baník Ostrava
- Champions League: Slavia Prague, Sparta Prague
- Matches: 80
- Goals: 327 (4.09 per match)
- Top goalscorer: Marjolen Nekesa (23)
- Biggest home win: Slavia Prague 12–0 Baník Ostrava; Sparta Prague 12–0 Lokomotiva Brno
- Biggest away win: Lokomotiva Brno 0–11 Slavia Prague
- Highest scoring: Slavia Prague 12–0 Baník Ostrava; Sparta Prague 12–0 Lokomotiva Brno
- Longest winning run: 11 matches Slavia Prague
- Longest unbeaten run: 20 matches Slavia Prague
- Longest winless run: 14 matches Pardubice
- Longest losing run: 11 matches Pardubice
- Highest attendance: 6,216; Slavia Prague 4–1 Sparta Prague
- Lowest attendance: 38; Pardubice 0–2 Slovan Liberec
- All statistics correct as of 25 May 2024.

The 2023–24 Czech Women's First League was the 31st season of the Czech Republic's top-tier football league for women. Slavia Prague were the defending champions.

== Format ==
The eight teams played each other twice for a total of 14 matches per team. After that the top four teams played a championship round for another six matches per team. The bottom placed four teams played the relegation round. The champions and runners-up qualify for the 2024–25 UEFA Women's Champions League.

== Teams ==
Location of teams in 2023–24 Czech Women's First League

=== Team changes ===
Promoted from 2022–23 Czech Women's Second League	Relegated from 2022–23 Czech Women's First League
Pardubice	Dukla Prague

=== Stadiums ===
Team	Home town	Home ground
Baník Ostrava	Ostrava	Radvanice
Pardubice	Pardubice	Areál Dolíček
Lokomotiva Brno H. H.	Brno	Hrušovany u Brna
Slavia Prague	Prague	SK Horní Měcholupy
Slovan Liberec	Liberec	Městský stadion
Slovácko	Uherské Hradiště	Městský stadion
Sparta Prague	Prague	Stadion SK Prosek
Viktoria Plzeň	Plzeň	Dobřany

== Regular season ==
=== Standings ===
The regular season ended on 31 March 2024.

Pos	Team	Pld	W	D	L	GF	GA	GD	Pts	Qualification or relegation
1	Slavia Prague	14	13	1	0	76	5	+71	40	Qualification for championship group
2	Sparta Prague	14	10	3	1	69	11	+58	33	Qualification for championship group
3	Slovácko	14	7	4	3	33	16	+17	25	Qualification for championship group
4	Slovan Liberec	14	6	3	5	22	17	+5	21	Qualification for championship group
5	Viktoria Plzeň	14	6	2	6	20	33	−13	20	Qualification for relegation group
6	Lokomotiva Brno H. H.	14	3	1	10	6	52	−46	10	Qualification for relegation group
7	Baník Ostrava	14	2	2	10	13	40	−27	8	Qualification for relegation group
8	Pardubice	14	0	2	12	5	70	−65	2	Qualification for relegation group

Source: Soccerway
Rules for classification: 1) Points; 2) Goal difference; 3) Number of goals scored

=== Results ===
Home \ Away	LOK	PAR	OST	SLA	SLO	SVK	SPA	VIK
Lokomotiva Brno H. H.		3–2	0–2	0–11	0–5	0–4	0–3	1–2
Pardubice	0–0		0–0	0–6	0–2	0–5	0–8	0–4
Baník Ostrava	0–1	5–2		0–2	0–2	0–3	1–4	1–2
Slavia Prague	5–0	10–0	12–0		3–0	3–0	3–3	7–0
Slovan Liberec	0–1	4–0	3–2	1–4		1–1	3–4	1–0
Slovácko	2–0	7–0	2–2	1–4	2–0		2–2	1–1
Sparta Prague	12–0	10–0	6–0	0–1	0–0	3–1		8–0
Viktoria Plzeň	4–0	6–1	1–0	0–5	0–0	0–2	0–6	

Source: Soccerway
Legend: Blue = home team win; Yellow = draw; Red = away team win.

== Final stage ==
=== Championship group ===
Played by the teams placed first to fourth of the regular season. Teams play each other twice.

Pos	Team	Pld	W	D	L	GF	GA	GD	Pts	Qualification or relegation	SLA	SPA	SVK	SLO
1	Slavia Prague (C, Q)	6	6	0	0	22	5	+17	58	Qualification to Champions League second round		4–1	2–0	4–2
2	Sparta Prague (Q)	6	4	0	2	14	10	+4	45	Qualification to Champions League first round	1–3		2–1	5–0
3	Slovácko	6	0	2	4	5	12	−7	27		0–3	1–2		2–2
4	Slovan Liberec	6	0	2	4	7	21	−14	23		1–6	1–3	1–1	

Source: Soccerway
Legend: Blue = home team win; Yellow = draw; Red = away team win.
Rules for classification: 1) Points; 2) Goal difference; 3) Number of goals scored
(C) Champions; (Q) Qualified for the phase indicated

=== Relegation group ===
Played by the teams placed fifth to eighth of the regular season. Teams play each other twice.

Pos	Team	Pld	W	D	L	GF	GA	GD	Pts	Qualification or relegation	VIK	PAR	LOK	OST
1	Viktoria Plzeň	6	2	1	3	8	8	0	27			3–4	0–1	1–0
2	Pardubice	6	5	0	1	12	12	0	17		2–1		2–1	0–5
3	Lokomotiva Brno H. H.	6	2	1	3	6	8	−2	17		0–2	1–2		3–2
4	Baník Ostrava (R)	6	1	2	3	9	7	+2	13	Relegation to 2024–25 II.league	1–1	1–2	0–0	

Source: Soccerway
Legend: Blue = home team win; Yellow = draw; Red = away team win.
Rules for classification: 1) Points; 2) Goal difference; 3) Number of goals scored
(R) Relegated

== Managerial changes ==
During the season:

Team	Outgoing manager	Manner of departure	Date of vacancy	Match-week	Position in table	Replaced by	Date of appointment	Contract valid until
Sparta Prague	(Czech Republic) Anton Mišovec	Mutual consent	12 September 2023	4	2nd	(Slovakia) Pavol Gregora	27 November 2023	Undisclosed
Slovácko	(Czech Republic) Petr Vlachovský	Police investigation	26 September 2023	4	3rd	(Czech Republic) Miroslav Zbořil	26 September 2023	Undisclosed
Viktoria Plzeň	(Czech Republic) Martin Löffelmann	Undisclosed	Undisclosed	10	5th	(Czech Republic) Pavel Hudeček	Undisclosed	Undisclosed

== Personnel and kits ==
Note: Flags indicate national team as has been defined under FIFA eligibility rules. Players may hold more than one non-FIFA nationality.

Team	Manager	Captain	Kit manufacturer	Shirt sponsor
Slovan Liberec	(Czech Republic) Petr Myslivec	(Czech Republic) Veronika Černá	Nike	Preciosa
Pardubice	(Czech Republic) Kamil Kozák	(Czech Republic) Denisa Kupková	Joma	—
Slavia Prague	(Czech Republic) Karel Piták	(Slovakia) Diana Bartovičová	Puma	eToro
Slovácko	(Czech Republic) Miroslav Zbořil	(Czech Republic) Markéta Klímová	Puma	Z-Group
Sparta Prague	(Slovakia) Pavol Gregora	(Czech Republic) Petra Bertholdová	Adidas	Betano
Viktoria Plzeň	(Czech Republic) Pavel Hudeček	(Czech Republic) Simona Pacandová	Macron	—
Lokomotiva Brno Horní Heršpice	(Czech Republic) Lukáš Zrzavý	(Czech Republic) Tereza Ruslerová	Adidas	EXCLUSIA
Baník Ostrava	(Poland) Witold Zajac	(Czech Republic) Kateřina Vojtková	Puma	Hyundai

== Season statistics ==
=== Top scorers ===
Final standing

Rank	Scorer	Club	Goals
1	(Kenya) Marjolen Nekesa	Slavia Prague	23
2	(Czech Republic) Tereza Kožárová	Sparta Prague	18
3	(Czech Republic) Kateřina Vojtková	Baník Ostrava	13
4	(Czech Republic) Klára Cvrčková	Sparta Prague	9
4	(Slovakia) Martina Šurnovská	Slavia Prague	9
5	(Czech Republic) Michaela Khýrová	Slavia Prague	8
5	(United States) Molly McLaughlin	Slavia Prague	8
5	(Czech Republic) Aneta Polášková	Slovácko	8

=== Clean sheets ===
Final standing

Rank	Player	Club	Clean sheets
1	(Czech Republic) Olivie Lukášová	Slavia Prague	9
2	(Czech Republic) Ivana Pižlová	Slovan Liberec	5
2	(Czech Republic) Michaela Radová	Viktoria Plzeň	5
3	(Czech Republic) Zuzana Kožuriková	Sparta Prague	4
3	(Czech Republic) Barbora Růžičková	Slovácko	4
3	(Czech Republic) Anežka Zelenková	Baník Ostrava	4
4	(Czech Republic) Adéla Fraňková	Slovácko	3
4	(Czech Republic) Vanesa Jílková	Lokomotiva Brno H. H.	3
5	(Czech Republic) Eliška Krejčí	Pardubice	2
