= 2022–23 Czech Women's First League =

Czech football season

Czech Women's First League
- Season: 2022–23
- Champions: Slavia Prague
- Promoted: Pardubice
- Relegated: Dukla Prague
- Champions League: Slavia Prague, Sparta Prague, Slovácko
- Matches: 80
- Goals: 319 (3.99 per match)
- Top goalscorer: Marjolen Nekesa (14)
- Biggest home win: Slavia Prague 10–0 Dukla Prague, Slavia Prague 10–0 Baník Ostrava
- Biggest away win: Dukla Prague 0–12 Slavia Prague
- Highest scoring: Dukla Prague 0–12 Slavia Prague
- Longest winning run: 6 matches Slavia Prague
- Longest unbeaten run: 14 matches Sparta Prague
- Longest winless run: 12 matches Baník Ostrava
- Longest losing run: 8 matches Baník Ostrava
- Highest attendance: 5,734; Sparta Prague 1–0 Slavia Prague
- Lowest attendance: 28; Viktoria Plzeň 3–1 Lokomotiva Brno
- All statistics correct as of 20 May 2023.

The 2022–23 Czech Women's First League was the 30th season of the Czech Republic's top-tier football league for women. Slavia Prague were the defending champions.

== Format ==
The eight teams played each other twice for a total of 14 matches per team. After that the top four teams played a championship round for another six matches per team. The bottom placed four teams played the relegation round. The champions, runners-up and third-placed teams qualified for the 2023–24 UEFA Women's Champions League.

== Teams ==
Location of teams in 2022–23 Czech Women's First League

=== Team changes ===
Promoted from 2021–22 Czech Women's Second League	Relegated from 2021–22 Czech Women's First League
Baník Ostrava	Pardubice

=== Stadiums ===
Team	Home town	Home ground
Baník Ostrava	Ostrava	Radvanice
Dukla Prague	Prague	Stadion Juliska
Lokomotiva Brno H. H.	Brno	Hrušovany u Brna
Slavia Prague	Prague	SK Horní Měcholupy
Slovan Liberec	Liberec	Městský stadion
Slovácko	Uherské Hradiště	Městský stadion
Sparta Prague	Prague	Stadion SK Prosek
Viktoria Plzeň	Plzeň	Dobřany

== Regular season ==
=== Standings ===
The regular season ended on 26 March 2023.

Pos	Team	Pld	W	D	L	GF	GA	GD	Pts	Qualification or relegation
1	Sparta Prague	14	11	3	0	52	8	+44	36	Qualification for championship group
2	Slavia Prague	14	11	1	2	76	10	+66	34	Qualification for championship group
3	Slovácko	14	8	3	3	38	24	+14	27	Qualification for championship group
4	Slovan Liberec	14	8	2	4	33	16	+17	26	Qualification for championship group
5	Viktoria Plzeň	14	4	2	8	21	35	−14	14	Qualification for relegation group
6	Lokomotiva Brno H. H.	14	3	1	10	14	42	−28	10	Qualification for relegation group
7	Dukla Prague	14	2	2	10	11	49	−38	8	Qualification for relegation group
8	Baník Ostrava	14	1	2	11	6	67	−61	5	Qualification for relegation group

Source: Soccerway
Rules for classification: 1) Points; 2) Goal difference; 3) Number of goals scored

=== Results ===
Home \ Away	LOK	DUK	OST	SLA	SLO	SVK	SPA	VIK
Lokomotiva Brno H. H.		2–1	4–0	1–4	1–5	1–4	0–6	1–0
Dukla Prague	2–0		0–1	0–12	0–2	2–4	0–0	2–3
Baník Ostrava	1–1	0–4		0–8	1–1	0–7	0–6	0–7
Slavia Prague	5–0	10–0	10–0		3–1	4–2	2–2	8–0
Slovan Liberec	6–0	3–0	2–0	2–1		1–2	1–3	6–1
Slovácko	3–2	5–0	5–0	0–5	1–1		1–1	1–1
Sparta Prague	2–0	7–0	8–1	1–0	3–1	6–1		4–0
Viktoria Plzeň	3–1	0–0	4–2	1–4	0–1	0–2	1–3	

Source: Soccerway
Legend: Blue = home team win; Yellow = draw; Red = away team win.

== Final stage ==
=== Championship group ===
Played by the teams placed first to fourth of the regular season. Teams play each other twice.

Pos	Team	Pld	W	D	L	GF	GA	GD	Pts	Qualification or relegation	SLA	SPA	SVK	SLO
1	Slavia Prague (C, Q)	6	6	0	0	14	1	+13	52	Qualification to Champions League second round		2–0	3–0	5–1
2	Sparta Prague (Q)	6	0	3	3	4	8	−4	39	Qualification to Champions League second round	0–1		1–1	2–2
3	Slovácko (Q)	6	2	1	3	4	9	−5	34	Qualification to Champions League first round	0–2	2–1		1–0
4	Slovan Liberec	6	1	2	3	5	9	−4	31		0–1	0–0	2–0	

Source: Soccerway
Legend: Blue = home team win; Yellow = draw; Red = away team win.
Rules for classification: 1) Points; 2) Goal difference; 3) Number of goals scored
(C) Champions; (Q) Qualified for the phase indicated

=== Relegation group ===
Played by the teams placed fifth to eighth of the regular season. Teams play each other twice.

Pos	Team	Pld	W	D	L	GF	GA	GD	Pts	Qualification or relegation	VIK	LOK	OST	DUK
1	Viktoria Plzeň	6	3	0	3	14	9	+5	23			2–0	5–2	3–0
2	Lokomotiva Brno H. H.	6	3	1	2	9	6	+3	20		1–0		3–0	2–0
3	Baník Ostrava	6	3	1	2	14	12	+2	15		3–2	2–2		3–0
4	Dukla Prague (R)	6	2	0	4	5	15	−10	14	Relegation to 2023–24 II.league	3–2	2–1	0–4	

Source: Soccerway
Legend: Blue = home team win; Yellow = draw; Red = away team win.
Rules for classification: 1) Points; 2) Goal difference; 3) Number of goals scored
(R) Relegated

== Managerial changes ==
Ahead of the season:

Team	Outgoing manager	Manner of departure	Date of vacancy	Replaced by	Date of appointment	Contract valid until
Slavia Prague	(Czech Republic) Michal Kolomazník	Undisclosed	Undisclosed	(Czech Republic) Karel Piták	15 July 2022	Undisclosed

During the season:

Team	Outgoing manager	Manner of departure	Date of vacancy	Match-week	Position in table	Replaced by	Date of appointment	Contract valid until
Sparta Prague	(Slovakia) Martin Masaryk	Sacked	4 May 2023	17	2nd	(Czech Republic) Anton Mišovec	4 May 2023	Undisclosed

== Personnel and kits ==
Note: Flags indicate national team as has been defined under FIFA eligibility rules. Players may hold more than one non-FIFA nationality.

Team	Manager	Captain	Kit manufacturer	Shirt sponsor
Slovan Liberec	(Czech Republic) Petr Myslivec	(Czech Republic) Veronika Černá	Nike	Preciosa
Dukla Prague	(Czech Republic) Jakub Kowolowski	(Czech Republic) Michaela Beránková	Adidas	ProInterier
Slavia Prague	(Czech Republic) Karel Piták	(Slovakia) Diana Bartovičová	Puma	eToro
Slovácko	(Czech Republic) Petr Vlachovský	(Czech Republic) Eliška Janíková	Puma	Z-Group
Sparta Prague	(Czech Republic) Anton Mišovec	(Czech Republic) Petra Bertholdová	Adidas	—
Viktoria Plzeň	(Czech Republic) Pavel Vacek	(Czech Republic) Miroslava Mrázová	Macron	—
Lokomotiva Brno Horní Heršpice	(Czech Republic) Lukáš Zrzavý	(Czech Republic) Tereza Ruslerová	Adidas	EXCLUSIA
Baník Ostrava	(Poland) Witold Zajac	(Czech Republic) Kateřina Vojtková	Puma	Hyundai

== Season statistics ==
=== Top scorers ===
Final standing

Rank	Scorer	Club	Goals
1	(Kenya) Marjolen Nekesa	Slavia Prague	14
2	(Czech Republic) Tereza Kožárová	Slavia Prague	13
3	(Czech Republic) Aneta Polášková	Slovácko	12
4	(Czech Republic) Tereza Szewieczková	Slavia Prague	11
5	(Czech Republic) Lucie Martínková	Sparta Prague	10
5	(Czech Republic) Anna Šubrtová	Sparta Prague / Slovan Liberec	10

=== Clean sheets ===
Final standing

Rank	Player	Club	Clean sheets
1	(Czech Republic) Olivie Lukášová	Slavia Prague	8
2	(Czech Republic) Ivana Pižlová	Slovan Liberec	7
3	(Czech Republic) Vanesa Jílková	Lokomotiva Brno H. H.	5
