= Tereza Krejčiříková =

Czech footballer

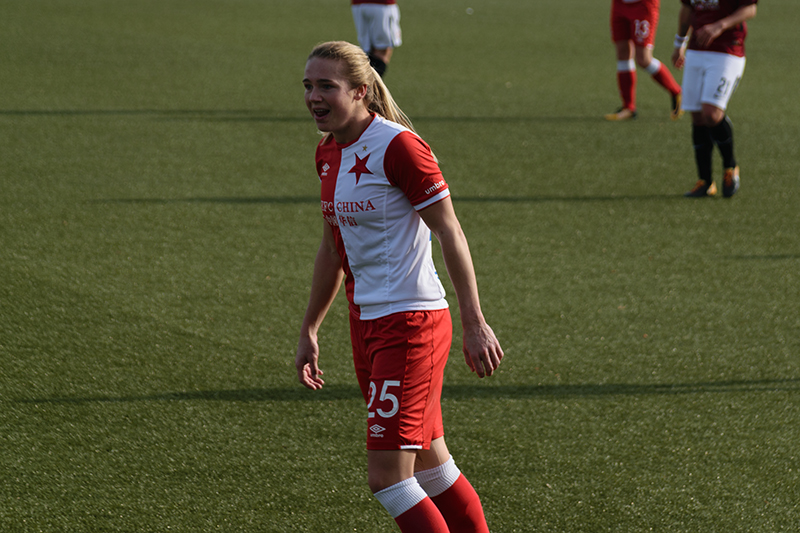

Personal information
- Full name: Tereza Krejčiříková
- Date of birth: 21 June 1996 (age 30)
- Place of birth: Klatovy, Czech Republic
- Height: 1.65 m (5 ft 5 in)
- Positions: Midfielder; forward

Team information
- Current team: Slavia Praha
- Number: 25

Youth career
- Start Luby
- Viktoria Plzeň
- 2008–2012: Sparta Praha

Senior career*
Years	Team	Apps	(Gls)
2012–2016	Sparta Praha	3	(2)
2016–	Slavia Praha		

International career^{‡}
2016–	Czech Republic	34	(5)
- * Club domestic league appearances and goals ‡ National team caps and goals as of 6 February 2022

Tereza Krejčiříková (born 21 June 1996) is a Czech football midfielder, currently playing for Slavia Praha in the Czech First Division. She is a member of the Czech national team.

== Career ==
While playing for Sparta Prague's youth team, Krejčiříková was voted talent of the year at the 2011 Czech Footballer of the Year (women). The following season she was promoted to the Czech First Division, and on 27 November 2013 she made her debut for the national team in a FIFA World Cup qualification match against Spain. In 2016 she moved to Slavia Prague.

== Career honours ==
=== Club ===
Sparta Prague

- Czech First Division (1): 2012-13
- Czech Women's Cup (1): 2013, 2015

Slavia Prague

- Czech First Division (5): 2016-17, 2019-20, 2021-22, 2022-23, 2023-24
- Czech Women's Cup (3): 2022, 2023, 2024

=== Individual ===
- Talent of the Year: 2011

== International goals ==
No.	Date	Venue	Opponent	Score	Result	Competition
1.	26 April 2014	Stadion v Městských sadech, Opava, Czech Republic	Estonia	3–0	6–0	2015 FIFA Women's World Cup qualification
2.	26 April 2014	Stadion v Městských sadech, Opava, Czech Republic	Estonia	5–0	6–0	2015 FIFA Women's World Cup qualification
3.	27 October 2020	Letní stadion, Chomutov, Czech Republic	Azerbaijan	2–0	3–0	UEFA Women's Euro 2022 qualifying
4.	21 September 2021	Stadion u Nisy, Liberec, Czech Republic	Cyprus	4–0	8–0	2023 FIFA Women's World Cup qualification
5.	21 February 2025	Stadion Aldo Drosina, Pula, Croatia	Croatia	3–0	4–0	2025 UEFA Women's Nations League
