= Czech Footballer of the Year (women) =

Award by the Football Association of the Czech Republic

- Sport: Association football
- Awarded for: Best female Czech football player
- Local name: Fotbalistka roku
- Country: Czech Republic
- Presented by: FAČR

History
- First award: 2002
- Editions: 24
- First winner: Kateřina Došková
- Most wins: Kateřina Svitková, Pavlína Ščasná (4 wins)
- Most recent: Klára Cahynová
- Website: Official website

The Czech Footballer of the Year (Czech: Fotbalistka roku) is awarded annually in the Czech Republic by the Czech Football Association (FAČR) to people connected with women's football. Czech players in the Czech Republic and abroad are eligible. Awards for young player and coach of the year are also given.

Year	Footballer of the Year	Talent of the Year	Coach of the Year	Ref
2025	Klára Cahynová (Real Sociedad)	Lucie Kroupová (Slavia Prague)	Jiří Vágner (Slavia Prague)	
2024	Kamila Dubcová (AC Milan / St. Pölten)	Markéta Jančářová (Slovácko)	Karel Rada (Czech Republic)	
2023	Klára Cahynová (Sevilla)	Albina Goretkiová (Slavia Prague / Slovan Liberec)	Karel Piták (Slavia Prague)	
2022	Andrea Stašková (Juventus / Atlético Madrid)	Lucie Bendová (Slavia Prague)	Karel Rada (Czech Republic)	
2021	Andrea Stašková (Juventus)	Lucie Jelínková (Slovácko)	Karel Rada (Czech Republic)	
2020	Kateřina Svitková (Slavia Prague / West Ham United)	Aneta Pochmanová (Sparta Prague)	Karel Rada (Czech Republic)	
2019	Kateřina Svitková (Slavia Prague)	Eliška Sonntagová (Sparta Prague)	Karel Rada (Czech Republic)	
2018	Kateřina Svitková (Slavia Prague)	Andrea Stašková (Sparta Prague)	Petr Vlachovský (Slovácko)	
2017	Lucie Voňková (Jena / Bayern Munich)	Andrea Stašková (Sparta Prague)	Karel Rada (Czech Republic)	
2016	Lucie Voňková (Jena)	Kamila Dubcová (Slovácko)	Karel Rada (Czech Republic WU-17 and Viktoria Plzeň)	
2015	Kateřina Svitková (Slavia Prague)	Kamila Dubcová (Slovácko)	Anton Mišovec (Slavia Prague)	
2014	Lucie Martínková (Örebro)	Tereza Szewieczková (Sparta Prague)	Anton Mišovec (Slavia Prague)	
2013	Lucie Martínková (Örebro)	Kateřina Svitková (Slavia Prague)	Petr Vlachovský (Slovácko)	
2012	Lucie Martínková (Sparta Prague)	Lucie Hloupá (Sparta Prague)	Petr Čermák (Czech Republic)	
2011	Veronika Pincová (Slavia Prague)	Tereza Krejčiříková (Sparta Prague)	Vladimír Hruška (Czech Republic)	
2010	Petra Divišová (Slavia Prague)	Nikola Danihelková (Sparta Prague)	Vladimír Hruška (Czech Republic)	
2009	Petra Divišová (Slavia Prague)	Jana Sedláčková (Sparta Prague)	Martin Šeran (Slavia Prague)	
2008	Pavlína Ščasná (Malmö)	Eva Bartoňová (Hradec Králové)	Dušan Žovinec (Czech Republic and Sparta Prague)	
2007	Pavlína Ščasná (Örebro)	Adéla Pivoňková (Sparta Prague)	Dušan Žovinec (Czech Republic and Sparta Prague)	
2006	Pavlína Ščasná (Örebro)	Kamila Veselá (Zbrojovka Brno)	Dušan Žovinec (Sparta Prague)	
2005	Zuzana Pincová (Sparta Prague)	Lucie Kladrubská (Sparta Prague)	Dušan Žovinec (Sparta Prague)	
2004	Pavlína Ščasná (Bayern Munich)	Lucie Martínková (Sparta Prague)	Dušan Žovinec (Sparta Prague)	
2003	Eva Šmeralová (Sparta Prague)	Iveta Stojkovičová (Compex Otrokovice)	Dušan Žovinec (Sparta Prague)	
2002	Kateřina Došková (Sparta Prague)	Alexandra Mouchová (Sparta Prague)	Miloslav Veselý	

== See also ==
- List of sports awards honoring women
