= Zuzana Pincová =

Czech footballer

Personal information
- Date of birth: 6 October 1973 (age 53)
- Place of birth: Czechoslovakia
- Position: Goalkeeper

Senior career*
Years	Team	Apps	(Gls)
- Sparta Prague

International career
1993–2007	Czech Republic	63	(0)
- * Club domestic league appearances and goals

Zuzana Pincová is a Czech former football goalkeeper, who represented her country 63 times between 1993 and 2007.

She played for the Czech national team. She made her debut on 21 June 1993 in a match against Slovakia.

Pincová was voted footballer of the year at the 2005 Czech Footballer of the Year (women).
