= Radvanice a Bartovice =

Borough of Ostrava, Czech Republic

- Borough of Ostrava
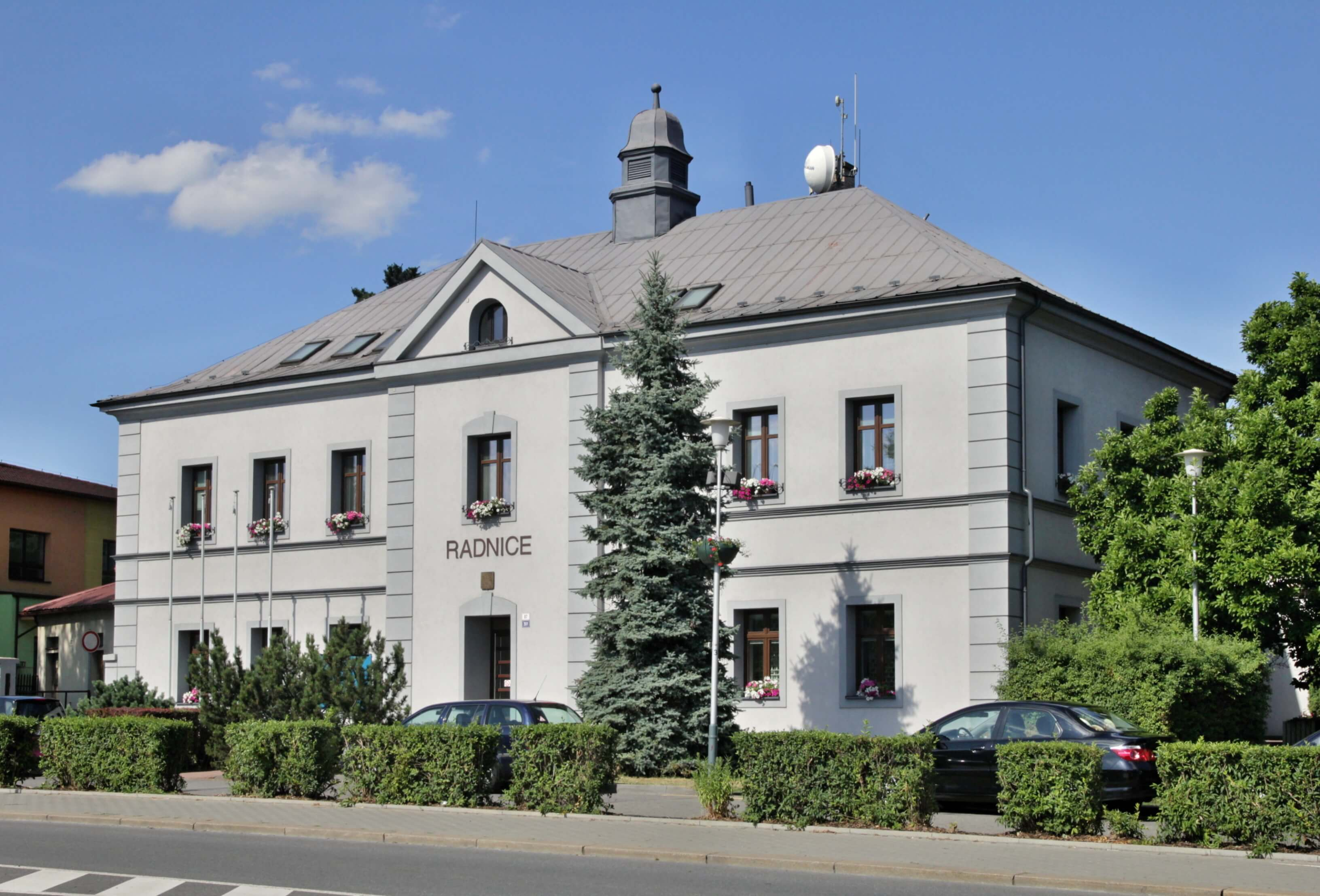
- Borough office of Radvanice a Bartovice

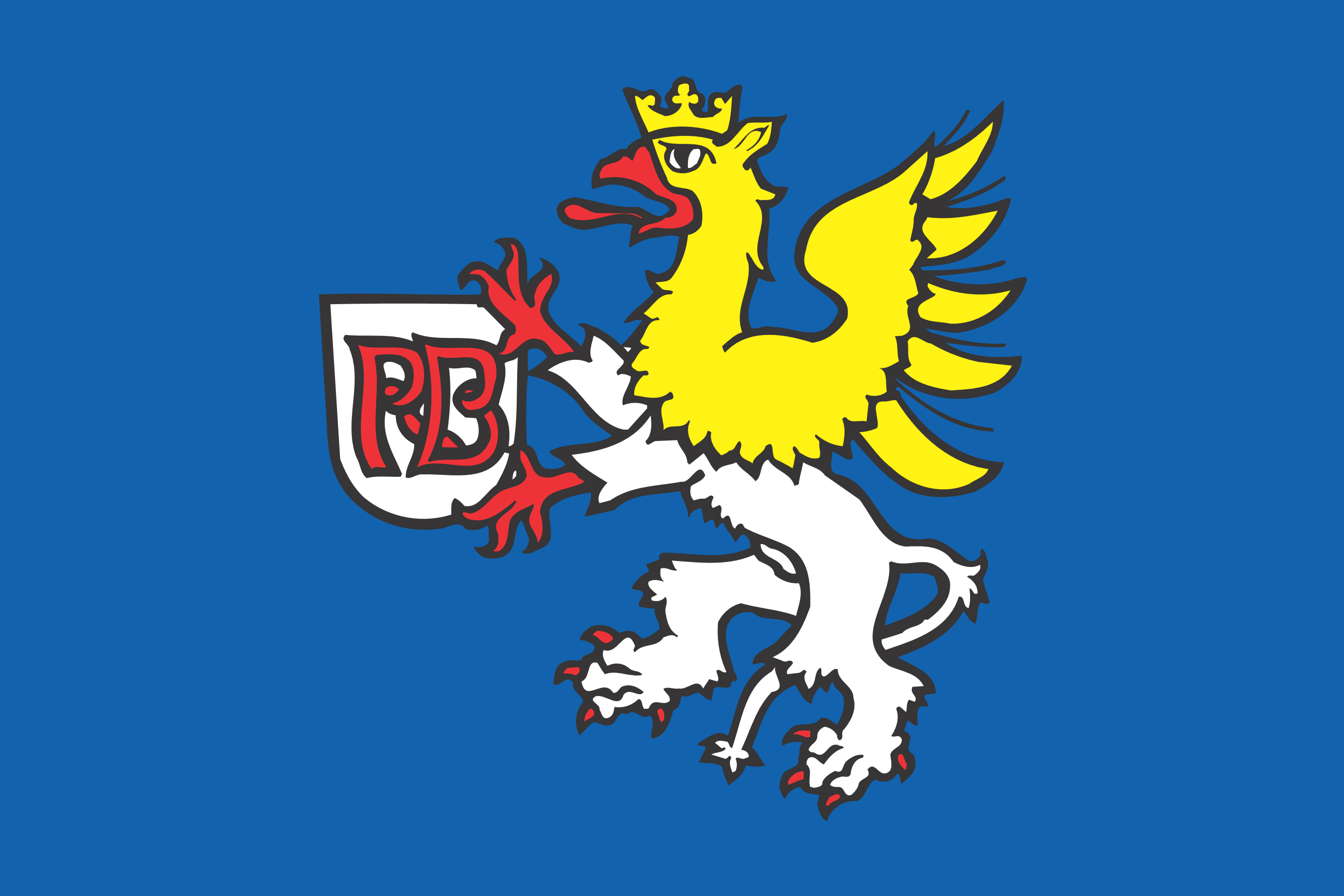
- Flag Coat of arms

- Location of Radvanice a Bartovice in Ostrava
- Coordinates: 49°48′59″N 18°20′6″E
- Country: Czech Republic
- Region: Moravian-Silesian
- Municipality: Ostrava

Area
  - Total: 16.66 km^{2} (6.43 sq mi)

Population (2021)
  - Total: 1,821
  - Density: 109.3/km^{2} (283.1/sq mi)
- Time zone: UTC+1 (CET)
  - Summer (DST): UTC+2 (CEST)
- Postal code: 716 00
- Website: radvanice.ostrava.cz

Radvanice a Bartovice is a borough of the city of Ostrava, Czech Republic. Situated in the eastern part of the city, it comprises the city parts Radvanice and Bartovice, both originally separate municipalities. Radvanice was incorporated into Ostrava in 1941, Bartovice in 1960. On 24 November 1990, Radvanice and Bartovice were merged and became one of the 23 self-governing boroughs of Ostrava.

== Etymology ==
The name Radvanice is derived from the Czech given name Radovan or Radvan, presumably a lokator of the village. The name Bartovice is derived from the Czech given name Bertold or Bartoloměj, who was also presumably a lokator of the village.

== Gallery ==
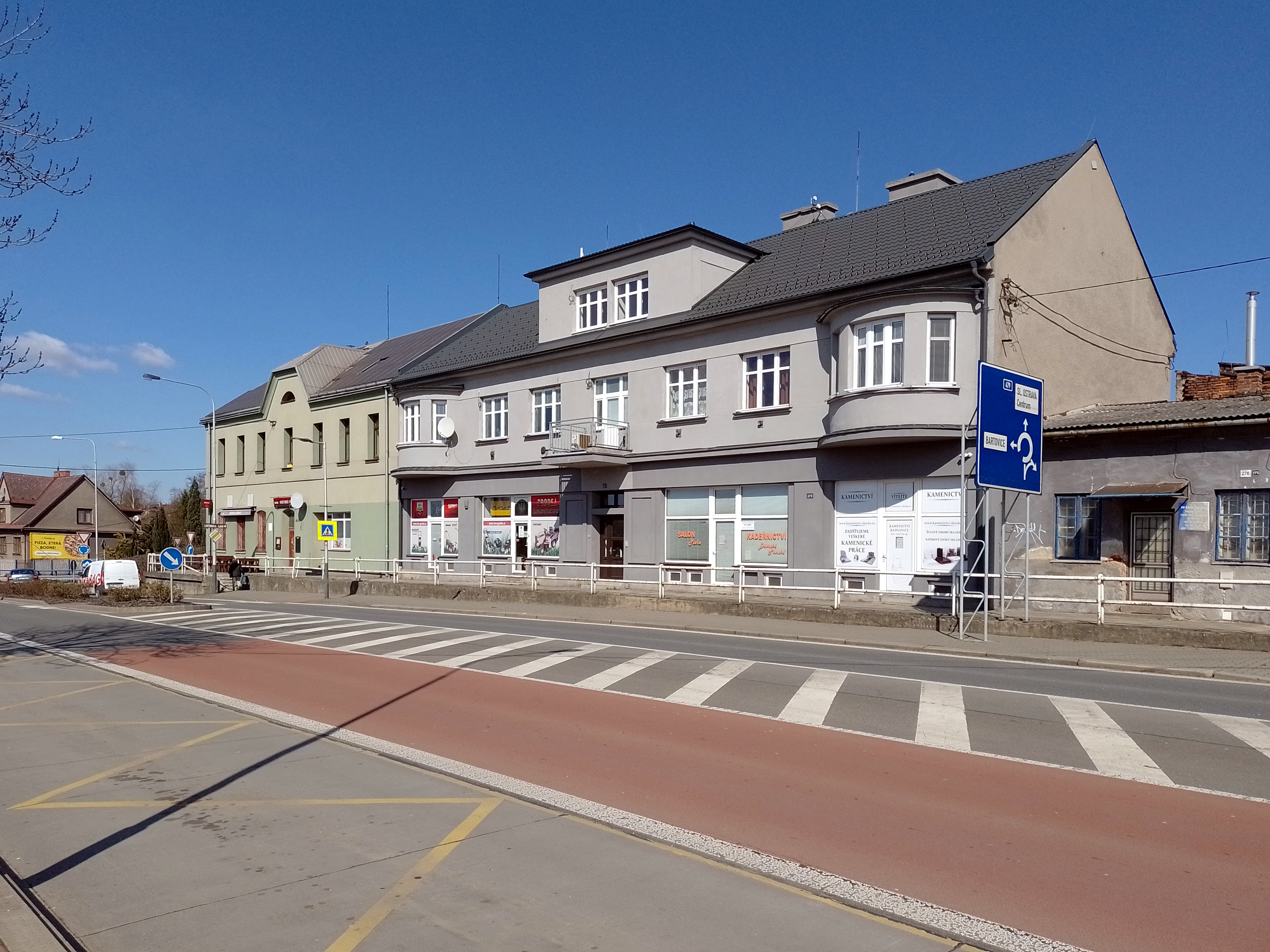
Těšínská street in Radvanice

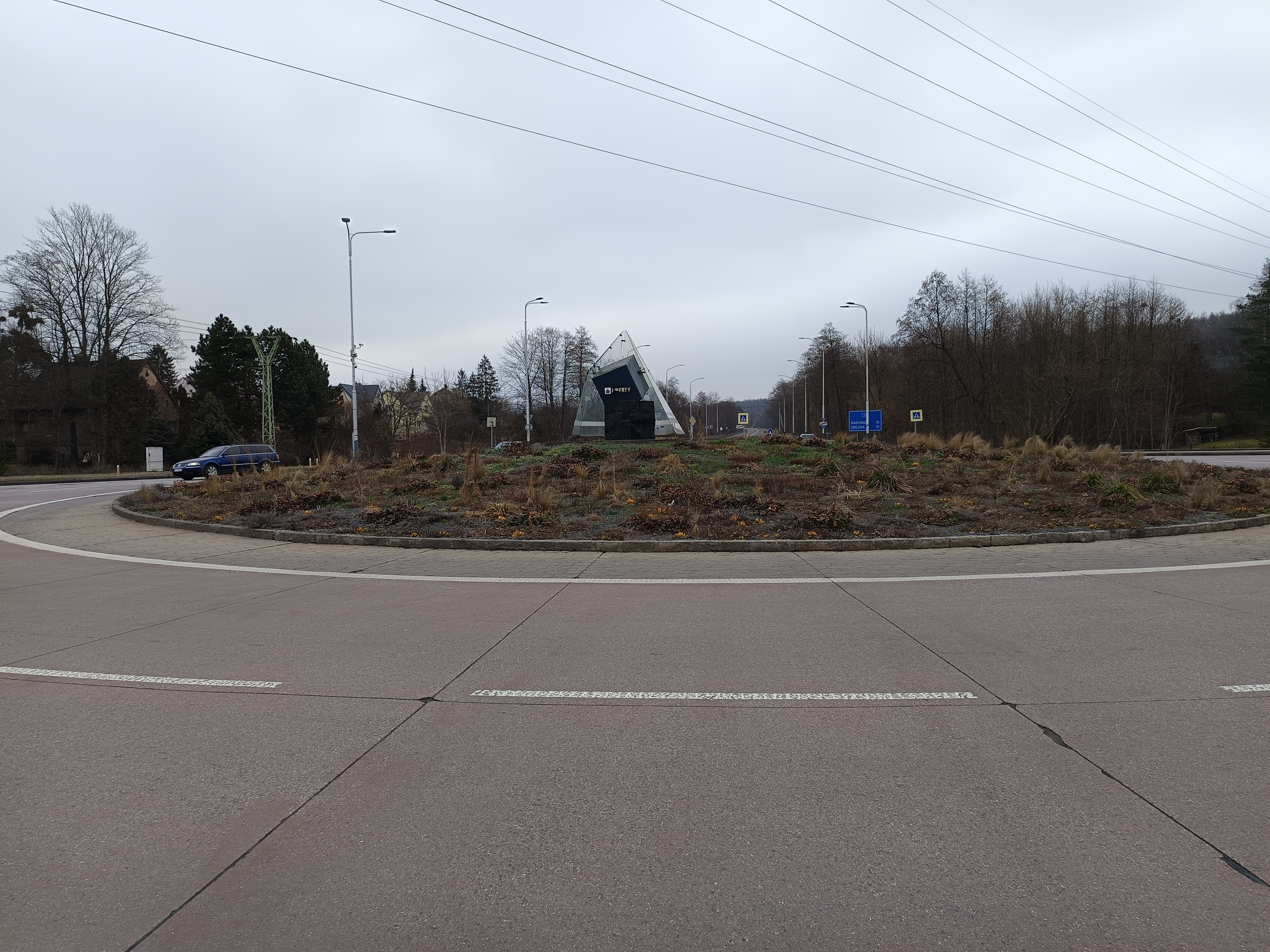
Roundabout in Bartovice
