= Vladimír Hruška =

Czech footballer and manager

Personal information
- Date of birth: 2 August 1957 (age 69)
- Place of birth: Prague, Czechoslovakia
- Height: 1.89 m (6 ft 2 in)
- Position: Midfielder

Senior career*
Years	Team	Apps	(Gls)
1979–1981	RH Cheb	30	(12)
1981–1988	Bohemians Prague	127	(26)
1988–1991	AS Angoulême		
1991–1993	Chmel Blšany		

International career
1985	Czechoslovakia	3	(1)

Managerial career
- Bohemians Prague
- 2009–2012: Czech Republic Women
- * Club domestic league appearances and goals

Vladimír Hruška (born 2 August 1957) is a Czech football manager and retired player. He was also manager of the Czech Republic women's national football team.

Hruška played for Bohemians Prague for most of his career. He also had spells with RH Cheb, AS Angoulême and Chmel Blšany.

He played three matches for Czechoslovakia in 1986 FIFA World Cup qualification, scoring one goal.

Hruška was the last manager who led Bohemians Prague before it collapsed in the middle of the 2004–05 Czech 2. Liga season. In May 2005 he was unveiled as the new manager of another Bohemians team in Prague.

As manager of the Czech Republic women's national football team, Hruška was voted manager of the year for women's football at the 2010 and 2011 Czech Footballer of the Year (women) awards.
