= 2024–25 UEFA Women's Champions League =

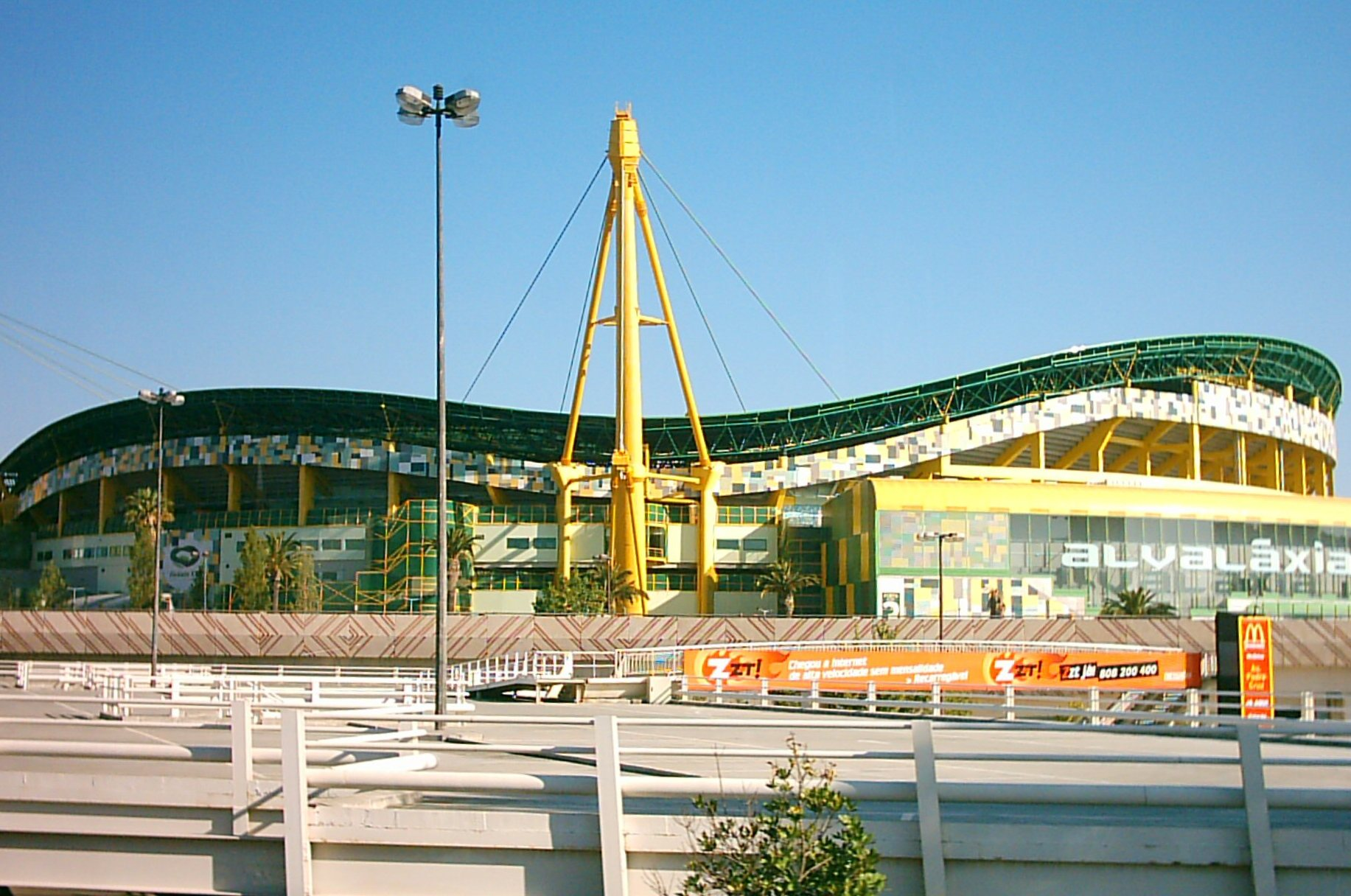
- The Estádio José Alvalade in Lisbon hosted the final

Tournament details
- Dates: Qualifying rounds: 4–26 September 2024; Competition proper: 8 October 2024 – 24 May 2025
- Teams: Competition proper: 16; Total: 72 (from 50 associations)

Final positions
- Champions: (England) Arsenal (2nd title)
- Runners-up: (Spain) Barcelona

Tournament statistics
- Matches played: 61
- Goals scored: 232 (3.8 per match)
- Attendance: 423,726 (6,946 per match)
- Top scorer(s): Clàudia Pina (Barcelona); 10 goals
- Best player: Aitana Bonmatí (Barcelona)
- Best young player: Melchie Dumornay (Lyon)

The 2024–25 UEFA Women's Champions League was the 24th edition of the European women's club football championship organised by UEFA, and the 16th edition since being rebranded as the UEFA Women's Champions League. It was the final edition to feature a 16-team group stage. The winners automatically qualified for the 2025–26 UEFA Women's Champions League league phase, the 2026 FIFA Women's Champions Cup semi-finals and the 2028 FIFA Women's Club World Cup.

The final was held at the Estádio José Alvalade in Lisbon, Portugal. Arsenal won the match 1–0 against defending champions Barcelona for their second UEFA Women's Cup/Champions League title, and their first in 18 years. Since the 2006—07 UEFA Women's Cup

== Association team allocation ==
The association ranking based on UEFA women's country coefficients was used to determine the number of participating teams for each association:

- Associations 1–6 each had three teams qualify.
- Associations 7–16 each had two teams qualify.
- All other associations, if they entered, each had one team qualify.
- The winners of the 2023–24 UEFA Women's Champions League were given an additional entry if they did not qualify for the 2024–25 UEFA Women's Champions League through their domestic league.

An association had to have an eleven-a-side women's domestic league to enter a team. As of 2019–20, 52 of the 55 UEFA member associations organized a women's domestic league, with the exceptions being Andorra (1 club in Spain), Liechtenstein (3 clubs in Switzerland) and San Marino (1 club in Italy).

=== Association ranking ===
For the 2024–25 UEFA Women's Champions League, the associations were allocated places according to their 2023 UEFA women's Association coefficients, which took into account their performance in European competitions from 2018–19 to 2022–23.

Association ranking for 2024–25 UEFA Women's Champions League

Rank	Association	Coeff.	Teams	Notes
1	France	80.833	3	
2	Germany	76.666	3	
3	Spain	71.166	3	
4	England	61.833	3	
5	Italy	35.000	3	
6	Sweden	26.999	3	
7	Czech Republic	26.166	2	
8	Denmark	25.750	2	
9	Portugal	24.000	2	
10	Netherlands	22.000	2	
11	Norway	20.500	2	
12	Scotland	20.500	2	
13	Austria	20.250	2	
14	Ukraine	20.000	2	
15	Iceland	18.500	2	
16	Belarus	18.500	2	
17	Kazakhstan	18.500	1	
18	Switzerland	16.250	1	
19	Albania	14.000	1	

Rank	Association	Coeff.	Teams	Notes
20	Cyprus	14.000	1	
21	Serbia	14.000	1	
22	Belgium	12.000	1	
23	Bosnia and Herzegovina	11.500	1	
24	Russia	14.250	0	
25	Finland	11.000	1	
26	Hungary	9.500	1	
27	Poland	9.500	1	
28	Lithuania	9.500	1	
29	Romania	8.000	1	
30	Croatia	8.500	1	
31	Republic of Ireland	7.500	1	
32	Slovenia	7.500	1	
33	Turkey	7.500	1	
34	Greece	7.000	1	
35	Kosovo	7.000	1	
36	Slovakia	6.500	1	
37	Bulgaria	6.500	1	

Rank	Association	Coeff.	Teams	Notes
38	Montenegro	6.000	1	
39	Israel	5.500	1	
40	Estonia	5.500	1	
41	Wales	5.500	1	
42	Georgia	5.000	1	
43	Luxembourg	4.500	1	
44	Northern Ireland	4.500	1	
45	Malta	4.000	1	
46	Latvia	3.500	1	
47	Faroe Islands	3.000	1	
47	Armenia	3.000	1	
47	North Macedonia	3.000	1	
47	Moldova	3.000	1	
NR	Azerbaijan	—	1	
NR	Gibraltar	—	0	DNE
NR	Andorra	—	0	NL
NR	Liechtenstein	—	0	NL
NR	San Marino	—	0	NL

=== Distribution ===
Access list for 2024–25 UEFA Women's Champions League
	Path	Teams entering in this round	Teams advancing from previous round
Round 1 (Mini-tournament)	Champions Path	43 champions from associations 8–51 (except Russia)	
Round 1 (Mini-tournament)	League Path	6 third-placed teams from associations 1–6; 10 second-placed teams from associations 7–16	
Round 2	Champions Path	3 champions from associations 5–7	11 knockout winners of the previous round
Round 2	League Path	6 second-placed teams from associations 1–6	4 knockout winners of the previous round
Group stage (16 Teams)		4 champions from associations 1–4 (including title holders)	7 knockout winners of the Champions Path; 5 knockout winners of the League Path
Knockout stage (8 Teams)			4 group winners from group stage; 4 group runners-up from group stage

As the Champions League title holders (Barcelona) have already qualified via their domestic leagues, the following changes were made:

- The champions of association 4 (England) enter the group stage instead of Round 2 (Champions Path).
- The champions of association 7 (Czechia) enter Round 2 instead of Round 1 (Champions Path).

=== Teams ===
The labels in the parentheses show how each team qualified for the place of its starting round:

- TH: Title holders
- 1st, 2nd, 3rd: League positions of the previous season

The two qualifying rounds, round 1 and round 2, were divided into Champions Path (CH) and League Path (LP).

Qualified teams for 2024–25 UEFA Women's Champions League
Entry round		Teams			
Group stage		(Spain) Barcelona (1st)^{TH}	(France) Lyon (1st)	(Germany) Bayern Munich (1st)	(England) Chelsea (1st)
Round 2	CH	(Italy) Roma (1st)	(Sweden) Hammarby (1st)	(Czech Republic) Slavia Prague (1st)	
Round 2	LP	(France) Paris Saint-Germain (2nd)	(Germany) VfL Wolfsburg (2nd)	(Spain) Real Madrid (2nd)	(England) Manchester City (2nd)
Round 2	LP	(Italy) Juventus (2nd)	(Sweden) BK Häcken (2nd)		
Round 1	CH	(Denmark) Nordsjælland (1st)	(Portugal) Benfica (1st)	(Netherlands) Twente (1st)	(Norway) Vålerenga (1st)
Round 1	CH	(Scotland) Celtic (1st)	(Austria) St. Pölten (1st)	(Ukraine) Vorskla Poltava (1st)	(Iceland) Valur (1st)
Round 1	CH	(Belarus) Dinamo Minsk (1st)	(Kazakhstan) BIIK Shymkent (1st)	(Switzerland) Servette (1st)	(Albania) Vllaznia (1st)
Round 1	CH	(Cyprus) Apollon Ladies (1st)	(Serbia) Crvena zvezda (1st)	(Belgium) Anderlecht (1st)	(Bosnia and Herzegovina) SFK 2000 (1st)
Round 1	CH	(Finland) KuPS (1st)	(Hungary) Ferencváros (1st)	(Poland) Pogoń Szczecin (1st)	(Lithuania) Gintra (1st)
Round 1	CH	(Romania) Farul Constanța (1st)	(Croatia) Osijek (1st)	(Republic of Ireland) Peamount United (1st)	(Slovenia) Mura (1st)
Round 1	CH	(Turkey) Galatasaray (1st)	(Greece) PAOK (1st)	(Kosovo) Mitrovica (1st)	(Slovakia) Spartak Myjava (1st)
Round 1	CH	(Bulgaria) NSA Sofia (1st)	(Montenegro) Breznica (1st)	(Israel) Kiryat Gat (1st)	(Estonia) Flora (1st)
Round 1	CH	(Wales) Cardiff City (1st)	(Georgia (country)) Lanchkhuti (1st)	(Luxembourg) Racing Union (1st)	(Northern Ireland) Glentoran (1st)
Round 1	CH	(Malta) Birkirkara (1st)	(Latvia) SFK Rīga (1st)	(Faroe Islands) KÍ (1st)	(Moldova) Agarista Anenii Noi (1st)
Round 1	CH	(North Macedonia) Ljuboten (1st)	(Armenia) Pyunik (1st)	(Azerbaijan) Neftçi (1st)	
Round 1	LP	(France) Paris FC (3rd)	(Germany) Eintracht Frankfurt (3rd)	(Spain) Atlético Madrid (3rd)	(England) Arsenal (3rd)
Round 1	LP	(Italy) Fiorentina (3rd)	(Sweden) Linköping (3rd)	(Czech Republic) Sparta Prague (2nd)	(Denmark) Brøndby (2nd)
Round 1	LP	(Portugal) Sporting CP (2nd)	(Netherlands) Ajax (2nd)	(Norway) Rosenborg (2nd)	(Scotland) Rangers (2nd)
Round 1	LP	(Austria) First Vienna FC (2nd)	(Ukraine) Kolos Kovalivka (2nd)	(Iceland) Breiðablik (2nd)	(Belarus) FC Minsk (2nd)

Notes

1. Russia (RUS): On 28 February 2022, Russian football clubs and national teams were suspended from FIFA and UEFA competitions. The tables reflect Russia's ongoing suspension from UEFA competitions.

== Schedule ==
The schedule of the competition was as follows.

Schedule for 2024–25 UEFA Women's Champions League
Phase	Round	Draw date	First leg	Second leg
Qualifying	First round	5 July 2024	4 September 2024 (semi-finals)	7 September 2024 (third-place play-off & final)
Qualifying	Second round	9 September 2024	18–19 September 2024	25–26 September 2024
Group stage	Matchday 1	27 September 2024	8–9 October 2024	
Group stage	Matchday 2	27 September 2024	16–17 October 2024	
Group stage	Matchday 3	27 September 2024	12–13 November 2024	
Group stage	Matchday 4	27 September 2024	20–21 November 2024	
Group stage	Matchday 5	27 September 2024	11–12 December 2024	
Group stage	Matchday 6	27 September 2024	17–18 December 2024	
Knockout phase	Quarter-finals	7 February 2025	18–19 March 2025	26–27 March 2025
Knockout phase	Semi-finals	7 February 2025	19–20 April 2025	26–27 April 2025
Knockout phase	Final	7 February 2025	24 May 2025 at Estádio José Alvalade, Lisbon	

== Qualifying rounds ==
=== Round 1 ===
A total of 59 teams played in Round 1.

==== Champions Path ====
Tournament 1

Hosted by SFK 2000.

Semi-finals
4 September
(Bosnia and Herzegovina) SFK 2000	3
(Faroe Islands) KÍ	0
4 September
(Portugal) Benfica	3
(Denmark) Nordsjælland	1

Final
7 September
(Bosnia and Herzegovina) SFK 2000	0
(Portugal) Benfica	4
Third place
7 September
(Faroe Islands) KÍ	0
(Denmark) Nordsjælland	2

Tournament 2

Hosted by Lanchkhuti.

Semi-finals
4 September
(Albania) Vllaznia	3
(Georgia (country)) Lanchkhuti	0
4 September
(Austria) St. Pölten	5
(Azerbaijan) Neftçi	0

Final
7 September
(Albania) Vllaznia	0
(Austria) St. Pölten	1
Third place
7 September
(Georgia (country)) Lanchkhuti	2
(Azerbaijan) Neftçi	1

Tournament 3

Hosted by Gintra.

Semi-finals
4 September
(Finland) KuPS	1
(Scotland) Celtic (a.e.t.)	3
4 September
(Lithuania) Gintra	5
(Moldova) Agarista Anenii Noi	0

Final
7 September
(Scotland) Celtic	2
(Lithuania) Gintra	0
Third place
7 September
(Finland) KuPS	6
(Moldova) Agarista Anenii Noi	0

Tournament 4

Hosted by Birkirkara.

Semi-finals
4 September
(Montenegro) Breznica	1
(Malta) Birkirkara (a.e.t.)	2
4 September
(Belgium) Anderlecht	4
(Serbia) Crvena Zvezda	1

Final
7 September
(Malta) Birkirkara	0
(Belgium) Anderlecht	5
Third place
7 September
(Montenegro) Breznica	0
(Serbia) Crvena Zvezda	3

Tournament 5

Hosted by Twente.

Semi-finals
4 September
(Netherlands) Twente	7
(Wales) Cardiff City	0
4 September
(Iceland) Valur	10
(North Macedonia) Ljuboten	0

Final
7 September
(Netherlands) Twente	5
(Iceland) Valur	0
Third place
7 September
(Wales) Cardiff City	0
(North Macedonia) Ljuboten	2

Tournament 6

Hosted by Apollon Ladies.

Semi-finals
4 September
(Cyprus) Apollon Ladies	3
(Armenia) FC Pyunik	0
4 September
(Slovenia) ŽNK Mura	3
(Northern Ireland) Glentoran	2

Final
7 September
(Cyprus) Apollon Ladies	2
(Slovenia) ŽNK Mura	3
Third place
7 September
(Armenia) FC Pyunik	0
(Northern Ireland) Glentoran	1

Tournament 7

Hosted by Pogoń Szczecin.

Semi-finals
4 September
(Greece) PAOK (a.e.t.)	2
(Israel) Kiryat Gat	1
4 September
(Switzerland) Servette	1
(Poland) Pogoń Szczecin	0

Final
7 September
(Greece) PAOK	0
(Switzerland) Servette	2
Third place
7 September
(Israel) Kiryat Gat	0
(Poland) Pogoń Szczecin	1

Tournament 8

Hosted by Racing Union.

Semi-finals
4 September
(Kazakhstan) BIIK Shymkent	3
(Bulgaria) NSA Sofia	0
4 September
(Luxembourg) Racing Union	1
(Turkey) Galatasaray	4

Final
7 September
(Kazakhstan) BIIK Shymkent	0
(Turkey) Galatasaray	5
Third place
7 September
(Bulgaria) NSA Sofia	0
(Luxembourg) Racing Union	2

Tournament 9

Hosted by Osijek.

Semi-finals
4 September
(Croatia) Osijek	2
(Slovakia) Spartak Myjava	0
4 September
(Belarus) Dinamo Minsk	1
(Republic of Ireland) Peamount (a.e.t.)	2

Final
7 September
(Croatia) Osijek	2
(Republic of Ireland) Peamount	1
Third place
7 September
(Slovakia) Spartak Myjava	2
(Belarus) Dinamo Minsk	3

Tournament 10

Hosted by Ferencváros.

Semi-finals
4 September
(Hungary) Ferencváros	2
(Estonia) Flora	1
4 September
(Ukraine) Vorskla Poltava	5
(Latvia) SFK Rīga	0

Final
7 September
(Hungary) Ferencváros	0
(Ukraine) Vorskla Poltava	2
Third place
7 September
(Estonia) Flora (a.e.t.) (p)	0 (7)
(Latvia) SFK Rīga	0 (6)

Tournament 11

Hosted by Farul Constanța.

Semi-finals
4 September
(Kosovo) Mitrovica	0
(Romania) Farul Constanța	4

Final
7 September
(Norway) Vålerenga	3
(Romania) Farul Constanța	1

==== League Path ====
Tournament 1

Hosted by Brøndby.

Semi-finals
4 September
(Denmark) Brøndby	0
(Italy) Fiorentina	1
4 September
(Netherlands) Ajax (a.e.t.)	4
(Ukraine) Kolos Kovalivka	1

Final
7 September
(Italy) Fiorentina	1
(Netherlands) Ajax	0
Third place
7 September
(Denmark) Brøndby	2
(Ukraine) Kolos Kovalivka	1

Tournament 2

Hosted by Linköping.

Semi-finals
4 September
(Czech Republic) Sparta Prague (a.e.t.)	3
(Sweden) Linköping	1
4 September
(France) Paris FC	9
(Austria) First Vienna	0

Final
7 September
(Czech Republic) Sparta Prague	0
(France) Paris FC	2
Third place
7 September
(Sweden) Linköping	8
(Austria) First Vienna	0

Tournament 3

Hosted by Arsenal.

Semi-finals
4 September
(England) Arsenal	6
(Scotland) Rangers	0
4 September
(Spain) Atlético Madrid	2 (2)
(Norway) Rosenborg (a.e.t.) (p)	2 (3)

Final
7 September
(England) Arsenal	1
(Norway) Rosenborg	0
Third place
7 September
(Scotland) Rangers	0
(Spain) Atlético Madrid	3

Tournament 4

Hosted by Breiðablik.

Semi-finals
4 September
(Belarus) FC Minsk	1
(Iceland) Breiðablik	6
4 September
(Germany) Eintracht Frankfurt	0
(Portugal) Sporting CP	2

Final
7 September
(Iceland) Breiðablik	0
(Portugal) Sporting CP	2
Third place
7 September
(Belarus) FC Minsk	0
(Germany) Eintracht Frankfurt	6

=== Round 2 ===
A total of 24 teams played in Round 2. The draw took place on 9 September 2024. The first legs were played on 18, 19 and 22 September, and the second legs on 25 and 26 September 2024.

The winners of the ties advanced to the group stage.

Round 2
Team 1	Agg.	Team 2	1st leg	2nd leg
Champions Path
St. Pölten (Austria)	8–0	(Slovenia) ŽNK Mura	3–0	5–0
Hammarby (Sweden)	3–2 (Note: Order of legs reversed after original draw.)	(Portugal) Benfica	1–2	2–0
Osijek (Croatia)	1–8	(Netherlands) Twente	1–4	0–4
Galatasaray (Turkey)	4–3	(Czech Republic) Slavia Prague	2–2	2–1 (a.e.t.)
Roma (Italy)	10–3	(Switzerland) Servette	3–1	7–2
Anderlecht (Belgium)	1–5	(Norway) Vålerenga	1–2	0–3
Vorskla Poltava (Ukraine)	0–3	(Scotland) Celtic	0–1	0–2
League Path
Sporting CP (Portugal)	2–5	(Spain) Real Madrid	1–2	1–3
Juventus (Italy)	5–2	(France) Paris Saint-Germain	3–1	2–1
Paris FC (France)	0–8	(England) Manchester City	0–5	0–3
Fiorentina (Italy)	0–12	(Germany) VfL Wolfsburg	0–7	0–5
BK Häcken (Sweden)	1–4	(England) Arsenal	1–0	0–4

== Group stage ==
The draw was held on 27 September 2024 and saw the 16 teams split into four pools of four teams.

Location of teams of the 2024–25 UEFA Women's Champions League group stage.
Brown: Group A; Red: Group B; Orange: Group C; Yellow: Group D.

=== Group A ===
Pos	Team	Pld	W	D	L	GF	GA	GD	Pts	Qualification	LYO	WOL	ROM	GAL
1	(France) Lyon	6	6	0	0	19	1	+18	18	Advance to quarter-finals	—	1–0	4–1	3–0
2	(Germany) VfL Wolfsburg	6	3	0	3	16	5	+11	9 (Note: Wolfsburg 3 Pts, +4 GD; Roma 3 Pts, −4 GD.)	Advance to quarter-finals	0–2	—	6–1	5–0
3	(Italy) Roma	6	3	0	3	12	14	−2	9		0–3	1–0	—	3–0
4	(Turkey) Galatasaray	6	0	0	6	1	28	−27	0		0–6	0–5	1–6	—

Source: UEFA
Rules for classification: Group stage tiebreakers

=== Group B ===
Pos	Team	Pld	W	D	L	GF	GA	GD	Pts	Qualification	CHE	RMA	TWE	CEL
1	(England) Chelsea	6	6	0	0	19	6	+13	18	Advance to quarter-finals	—	3–2	6–1	3–0
2	(Spain) Real Madrid	6	4	0	2	20	7	+13	12	Advance to quarter-finals	1–2	—	7–0	4–0
3	(Netherlands) Twente	6	2	0	4	9	19	−10	6		1–3	2–3	—	3–0
4	(Scotland) Celtic	6	0	0	6	1	17	−16	0		1–2	0–3	0–2	—

Source: UEFA
Rules for classification: Group stage tiebreakers

=== Group C ===
Pos	Team	Pld	W	D	L	GF	GA	GD	Pts	Qualification	ARS	BAY	JUV	VÅL
1	(England) Arsenal	6	5	0	1	17	9	+8	15	Advance to quarter-finals	—	3–2	1–0	4–1
2	(Germany) Bayern Munich	6	4	1	1	17	6	+11	13	Advance to quarter-finals	5–2	—	4–0	3–0
3	(Italy) Juventus	6	2	0	4	4	11	−7	6		0–4	0–2	—	3–0
4	(Norway) Vålerenga	6	0	1	5	3	15	−12	1		1–3	1–1	0–1	—

Source: UEFA
Rules for classification: Group stage tiebreakers

=== Group D ===
Pos	Team	Pld	W	D	L	GF	GA	GD	Pts	Qualification	BAR	MCI	HAM	PÖL
1	(Spain) Barcelona	6	5	0	1	26	3	+23	15 (Note: Barcelona 3 Pts, +1 GD; Manchester City 3 Pts, −1 GD.)	Advance to quarter-finals	—	3–0	9–0	7–0
2	(England) Manchester City	6	5	0	1	11	6	+5	15	Advance to quarter-finals	2–0	—	2–0	2–0
3	(Sweden) Hammarby	6	2	0	4	5	17	−12	6		0–3	1–2	—	2–0
4	(Austria) St. Pölten	6	0	0	6	4	20	−16	0		1–4	2–3	1–2	—

Source: UEFA
Rules for classification: Group stage tiebreakers

== Knockout phase ==
=== Bracket ===
Quarter-finals
(Spain) Real Madrid	2	0	2
(England) Arsenal	0	3	3
(Germany) Bayern Munich	0	1	1
(France) Lyon	2	4	6
(Germany) VfL Wolfsburg	1	1	2
(Spain) Barcelona	4	6	10
(England) Manchester City	2	0	2
(England) Chelsea	0	3	3

Semi-finals
(England) Arsenal	1	4	5
(France) Lyon	2	1	3
(Spain) Barcelona	4	4	8
(England) Chelsea	1	1	2

Final
24 May – Lisbon
(England) Arsenal	1
(Spain) Barcelona	0

=== Quarter-finals ===
The draw for the quarter-finals was held on 7 February 2025. The first legs were played on 18 and 19 March, and the second legs on 26 and 27 March 2025.

Quarter-finals
Team 1	Agg.	Team 2	1st leg	2nd leg
Real Madrid (Spain)	2–3	(England) Arsenal	2–0	0–3
Bayern Munich (Germany)	1–6	(France) Lyon	0–2	1–4
VfL Wolfsburg (Germany)	2–10	(Spain) Barcelona	1–4	1–6
Manchester City (England)	2–3	(England) Chelsea	2–0	0–3

=== Semi-finals ===
The draw for the semi-finals was held on 7 February 2025 (after the quarter-final draw). The first legs were played on 19 and 20 April, and the second legs on 27 April 2025.

Semi-finals
Team 1	Agg.	Team 2	1st leg	2nd leg
Barcelona (Spain)	8–2	(England) Chelsea	4–1	4–1
Arsenal (England)	5–3	(France) Lyon	1–2	4–1

=== Final ===
24 May 2025
17:00 UTC+1

Arsenal (The Football Association)	1–0	(Royal Spanish Football Federation) Barcelona
Blackstenius 74'	Report

Estádio José Alvalade, Lisbon
Attendance: 38,356
Referee: Ivana Martinčić (Croatia)

== Statistics ==
=== Top goalscorers ===
Rank	Player	Team	Goals
1	(Spain) Clàudia Pina	(Spain) Barcelona	10
2	(England) Alessia Russo	(England) Arsenal	7
2	(Spain) Mariona Caldentey	(England) Arsenal	7
4	(France) Kadidiatou Diani	(France) Lyon	6
4	(Haiti) Melchie Dumornay	(France) Lyon	6
4	(Poland) Ewa Pajor	(Spain) Barcelona	6
4	(Denmark) Pernille Harder	(Germany) Bayern Munich	6
8	(Netherlands) Kayleigh van Dooren	(Netherlands) Twente	5
8	(Denmark) Signe Bruun	(Spain) Real Madrid	5
10	(Spain) Aitana Bonmatí	(Spain) Barcelona	4
10	(Spain) Salma Paralluelo	(Spain) Barcelona	4
10	(Germany) Alexandra Popp	(Germany) VfL Wolfsburg	4
10	(Iceland) Sveindís Jane Jónsdóttir	(Germany) VfL Wolfsburg	4
10	(Colombia) Linda Caicedo	(Spain) Real Madrid	4

=== Team of the season ===
The UEFA technical study group selected the following players as the team of the tournament.

Pos.	Player	Team
GK	(Netherlands) Daphne van Domselaar	(England) Arsenal
DF	(United States) Emily Fox	(England) Arsenal
DF	(England) Leah Williamson	(England) Arsenal
DF	(Spain) Mapi León	(Spain) Barcelona
DF	(France) Sandy Baltimore	(England) Chelsea
MF	(Spain) Aitana Bonmatí	(Spain) Barcelona
MF	(Spain) Patricia Guijarro	(Spain) Barcelona
MF	(Spain) Mariona Caldentey	(England) Arsenal
FW	(Haiti) Melchie Dumornay	(France) Lyon
FW	(England) Alessia Russo	(England) Arsenal
FW	(Spain) Clàudia Pina	(Spain) Barcelona

=== Player of the season ===
- (Spain) Aitana Bonmatí ( (Spain) Barcelona)

=== Young player of the season ===
- (Haiti) Melchie Dumornay ( (France) Lyon)

== See also ==
- 2024–25 UEFA Champions League
