= Veronika Pincová =

Czech footballer

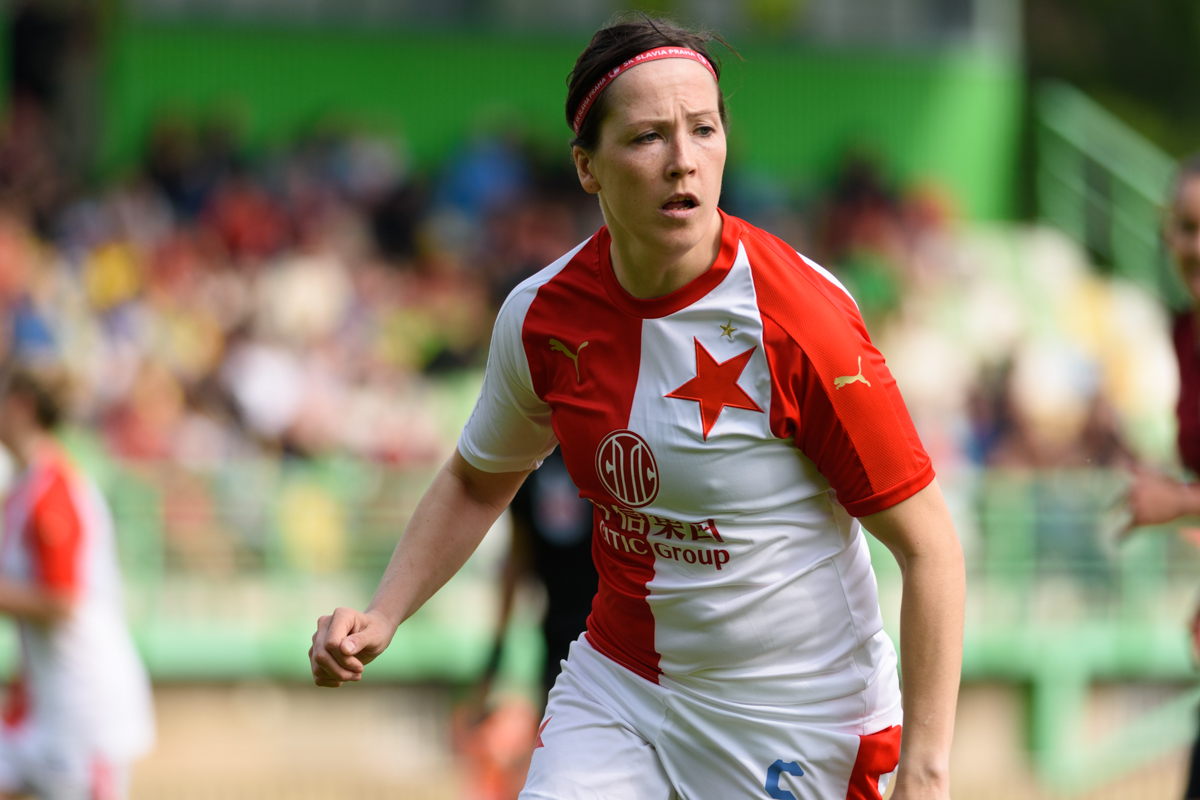
- Pincová with Slavia Prague in 2019

Personal information
- Date of birth: 15 November 1989 (age 36)
- Place of birth: Příbram, Czechoslovakia
- Position: Defender

Senior career*
Years	Team	Apps	(Gls)
2004–2022	Slavia Prague	249	(49)

International career^{‡}
2007–2018	Czech Republic	36	(4)
- * Club domestic league appearances and goals as of 16 July 2022 ‡ National team caps and goals as of 4 April 2018

Veronika Pincová (born 15 November 1989) is a former Czech football defender, who played for Slavia Prague in the Czech Women's First League. She was a member of the Czech national team for over a decade. Pincová was voted footballer of the year at the 2011 Czech Footballer of the Year (women).

== International career ==
She made her debut for the national team on 27 October 2007 in a UEFA Euro qualification match against Spain.

Goals for the Czech WNT in official competitions
Competition	Stage	Date	Location	Opponent	Goals	Result	Overall
2011 FIFA World Cup	Qualifiers	2009–10–25	Prague	Wales	2	2–1	2
2015 FIFA World Cup	Qualifiers	2014–06–18	Prague	North Macedonia	1	5–2	1
