= Marjolen Nekesa =

Kenyan footballer (born 1998)

Personal information
- Full name: Marjolen Nekesa Wafula
- Date of birth: 27 October 1998 (age 28)
- Place of birth: Kitale, Kenya
- Positions: Midfielder; striker

Team information
- Current team: Slavia Prague
- Number: 9

College career
Years	Team	Apps	(Gls)
4	Oklahoma Wesleyan Eagles		

Senior career*
Years	Team	Apps	(Gls)
2022	Minsk	15	(31)
2022–	Slavia Prague	16	(14)

International career
- Kenya
- * Club domestic league appearances and goals

Marjolen Nekesa Wafula (born 27 October 1998) is a Kenyan footballer who plays as a midfielder or striker for Czech Women's First League club Slavia Prague.

== Early life and education ==
Nekesa grew up in Nangili, Kakamega county Kenya. She was introduced to play football by her father at a young age. Nekesa attended Butere Girls High School before moving to the United States to attend Oklahoma Wesleyan University, where she majored in sports management. She scored 25 goals as a freshman.

== Club career ==
In 2022, Nekesa signed for Belarusian side Minsk, where she debuted and scored her first goal for the club during the Belarusian Women's Super Cup final. She was regarded as one of the club's most important players. In 2022, she signed for Czech side Slavia, where she played in the UEFA Women's Champions League and became the first Kenyan women's player to play in the Czech Republic. She was the top scorer of the 2022–23 Czech Women's First League with fourteen goals.

== International career ==
Nekesa was called up to the Kenya women's national football team for the 2018 Women's Africa Cup of Nations.

== Style of play ==
Nekesa mainly operates as a midfielder or a striker and has been described as "zapped opposing defenses with electric determination... combustible consistency might be the midfielder’s greatest asset".
