= Karel Piták =

Czech footballer

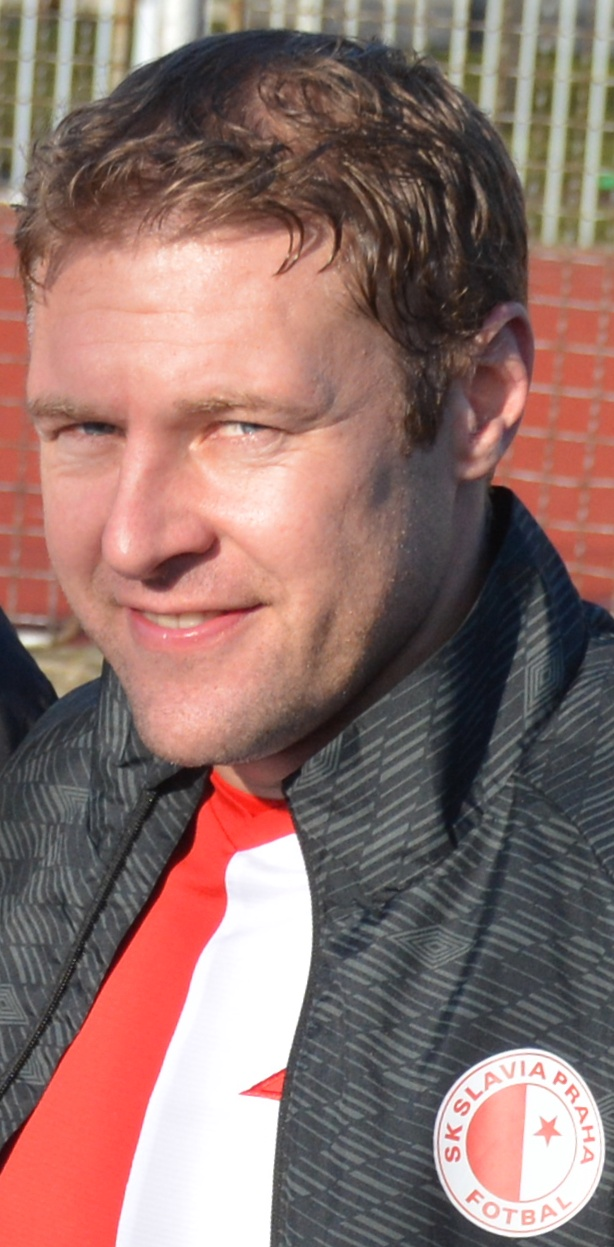
- Piták in 2016

Personal information
- Date of birth: 28 January 1980 (age 46)
- Place of birth: Hradec Králové, Czechoslovakia
- Height: 1.81 m (5 ft 11 in)
- Position: Midfielder

Youth career
- 1988–1998: Hradec Králové

Senior career*
| Years | Team | Apps | (Gls) |
| 1998–2002 | Hradec Králové | 65 | (8) |
| 2002–2006 | Slavia Prague | 121 | (30) |
| 2006–2010 | Red Bull Salzburg | 65 | (12) |
| 2010–2013 | Jablonec | 41 | (11) |
| 2014–2016 | Slavia Prague | 51 | (4) |
| 2016–2017 | Olympia Hradec Králové | | |
| 2017–? | SK Zápy | | |

International career
| 2006–2007 | Czech Republic | 3 | (0) |

Managerial career
- 2022–2024: Slavia Prague (women)
Medal record
Men's football
Representing Czech Republic
UEFA European Under-21 Championship
| Winner | 2002 Switzerland |
- * Club domestic league appearances and goals

Karel Piták (born 28 January 1980) is a Czech association football manager and former player.

A midfielder, Piták was part of the Czech side which won the UEFA U-21 Championships in 2002. He joined SK Zápy in summer 2017.

Since July 2022 Piták is manager of Slavia Prague (women). Piták was voted manager of the year for women's football at the 2023 Czech Footballer of the Year (women) awards.
