= Radvanice (Ostrava) =

Coordinates: 49°48′57″N 18°20′27″E

- Municipal part of Ostrava
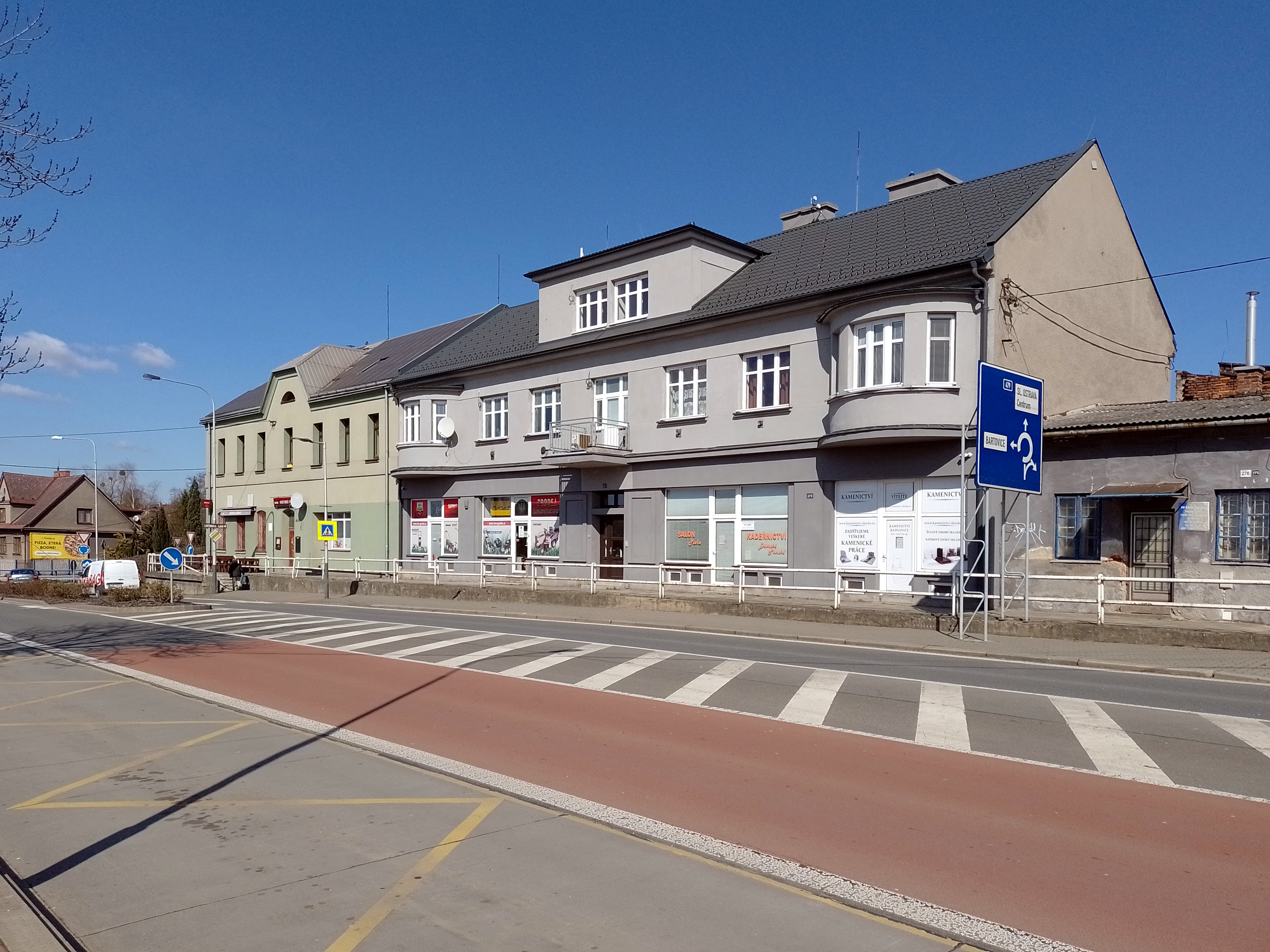
- Těšínská street
- Interactive map of Radvanice
- Country: Czech Republic
- Region: Moravian-Silesian Region
- City: Ostrava
- City district: Radvanice a Bartovice

Area
  - Total: 8.14 km^{2} (3.14 sq mi)

Population (2021)
  - Total: 4,182
  - Density: 514/km^{2} (1,330/sq mi)
- Time zone: UTC+1 (CET)
  - Summer (DST): UTC+2 (CEST)
- Postal code: 716 00

Radvanice (Polish: Radwanice, German: Radwanitz) is a municipal part of the city of Ostrava, Moravian-Silesian Region in the Czech Republic. Administratively it is a part of the district of Radvanice a Bartovice. Formerly an independent municipality, Radvanice became a part of Ostrava in 1941.

== History ==
The settlement was first mentioned in a Latin document of Diocese of Wrocław called Liber fundationis episcopatus Vratislaviensis from around 1305 as item in Radwanowitz. It meant that the village was in the process of location (the size of land to pay tithe from was not yet precised). The creation of the village was a part of a larger settlement campaign taking place in the late 13th century on the territory of what will be later known as Upper Silesia.

Politically the village belonged initially to the Duchy of Teschen, formed in 1290 in the process of feudal fragmentation of Poland and was ruled by a local branch of Piast dynasty. In 1327 the duchy became a fee of Kingdom of Bohemia, which after 1526 became part of the Habsburg monarchy.

It witnessed heavy industrialization at the end of the 19th century, locals worked mainly in coal mines.

== Demographics ==
According to the Austrian census of 1910 the village had 7,139 inhabitants, 7,096 of whom had permanent residence there. The census asked people for their native language, 5,772 (81.3%) were Czech-speaking and 1,202 (17%) were Polish-speaking. Most populous religious groups were Roman Catholics with 6,595 (92.4%) and Protestants with 388 (5.4%).

Historical population

Year	Pop.	±%
1869	1,528	—
1880	1,755	+14.9%
1890	2,337	+33.2%
1900	4,885	+109.0%
1910	7,139	+46.1%
1921	7,095	−0.6%
1930	8,136	+14.7%
1950	9,069	+11.5%

Year	Pop.	±%
1961	7,613	−16.1%
1970	5,862	−23.0%
1980	4,915	−16.2%
1991	4,279	−12.9%
2001	4,728	+10.5%
2011	4,657	−1.5%
2021	4,182	−10.2%

Source: Censuses
