= Ivana Pižlová =

Czech footballer

Personal information
- Full name: Ivana Pižlová
- Birth name: Ivana Cejpová
- Date of birth: 13 December 1981 (age 44)
- Place of birth: Czechoslovakia
- Height: 1.68 m (5 ft 6 in)
- Position: Goalkeeper

Team information
- Current team: Slovan Liberec
- Number: 77

Youth career
- Stráž nad Nisou
- Krásná Studánka

Senior career*
Years	Team	Apps	(Gls)
- Slavia Prague
?–2016	Slovan Liberec		
2016–2021	Sparta Prague	33	(0)
2021–	Slovan Liberec	0	(0)

International career^{‡}
2013–2021	Czech Republic	2	(0)
- * Club domestic league appearances and goals ‡ National team caps and goals as of 19 June 2021

Ivana Pižlová is a Czech football goalkeeper, currently playing for Slovan Liberec in the Czech Women's First League.

On 3 September 2023, Pižlová became the first woman to be inducted into FC Slovan Liberec's Hall of Fame.

She was a member of the Czech national team.
