= Hrušovany u Brna =

- Municipality
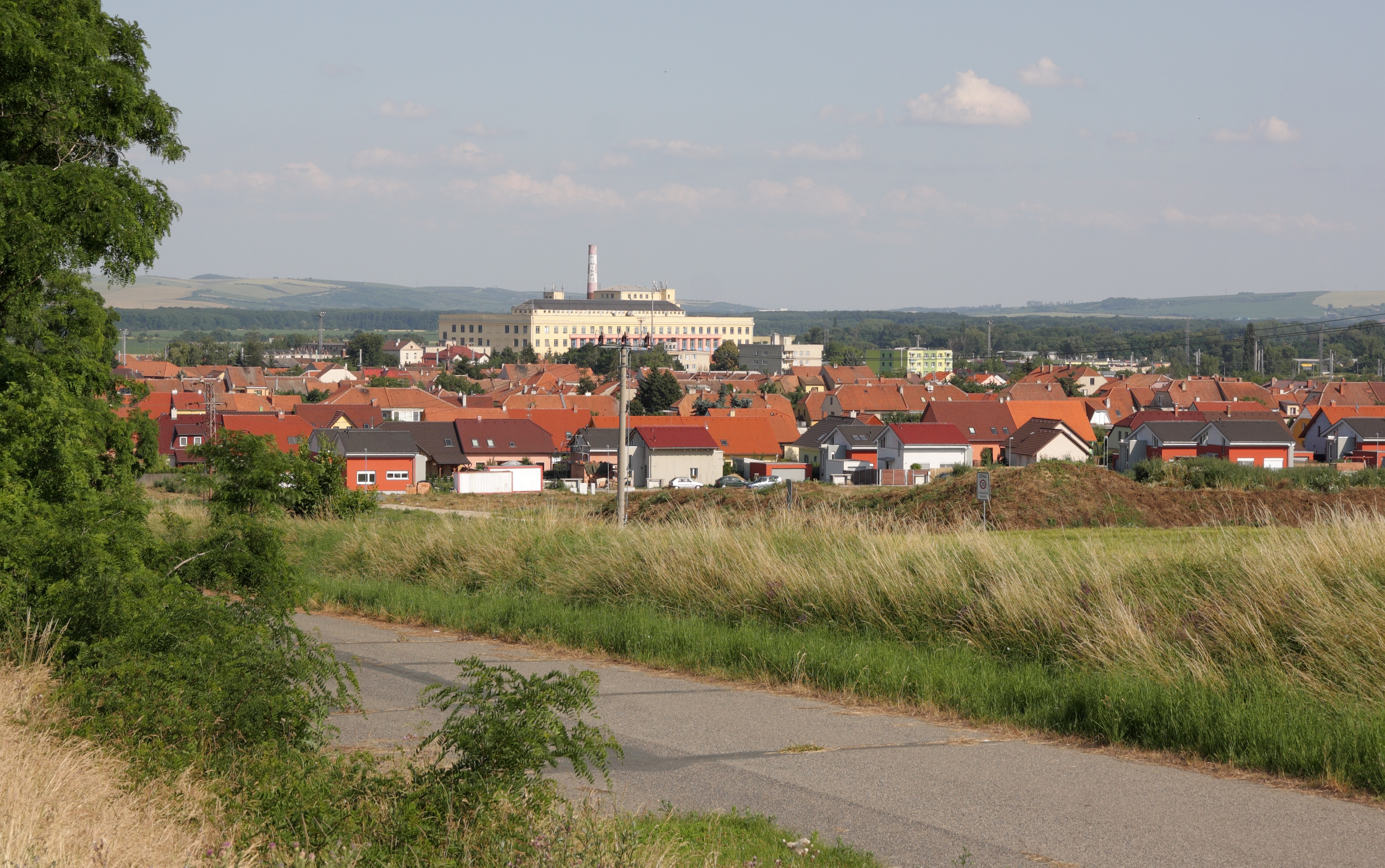
- General view

- Flag Coat of arms

- Location in the Czech Republic
- Coordinates: 49°2′19″N 16°35′39″E
- Country: Czech Republic
- Region: South Moravian
- District: Brno-Country
- First mentioned: 1252

Area
  - Total: 9.04 km^{2} (3.49 sq mi)
- Elevation: 184 m (604 ft)

Population (2026-01-01)
  - Total: 3,545
  - Density: 392/km^{2} (1,020/sq mi)
- Time zone: UTC+1 (CET)
  - Summer (DST): UTC+2 (CEST)
- Postal code: 664 62
- Website: www.hrusovanyubrna.cz

Hrušovany u Brna (Czech pronunciation: [ˈɦruʃovanɪ ˈu br̩na]; German: Rohrbach) is a municipality and village in Brno-Country District in the South Moravian Region of the Czech Republic. It has about 3,500 inhabitants.

== Etymology ==
The Czech name was probably derived from the word Hrušované, which indicates people who came from a place called Hrušov or Hrušová. The German name Rohrbach means 'reed stream'. There is also a theory that the Czech name was derived from the often flooded stream, which was called Gruschbach ('scary stream') in German and Grušový potok in Czech. The people who lived along the stream were called Grušované.

== Geography ==
Hrušovany u Brna is located about 16 kilometres (10 mi) south of Brno. It lies in the Dyje–Svratka Valley. The highest point is at 221 m (725 ft) above sea level. The municipality is situated on the right bank of the Šatava River.

== History ==
The first written mention of Hrušovany is from 1252, when the village was donated to the monastery in Žďár nad Sázavou. Wine growing in Hrušovany was first documented in 1341. The monastery owned Hrušovany until 1493 and then in the second half of the 16th century. In the 17th century, the owners often changed and included the Olomouc bishopric. In the 18th and 19th centuries, Hrušovany was a property of the Sinzendorf family (1702–1748), the Dietrichstein family (1748–1819) and the Dukes of Teschen (Albert Casimir and Charles Louis; 1819–1847).

== Demographics ==
Historical population

Year	Pop.	±%
1869	751	—
1880	811	+8.0%
1890	1,211	+49.3%
1900	1,289	+6.4%
1910	1,430	+10.9%

Year	Pop.	±%
1921	1,650	+15.4%
1930	1,839	+11.5%
1950	1,853	+0.8%
1961	2,001	+8.0%
1970	1,954	−2.3%

Year	Pop.	±%
1980	2,794	+43.0%
1991	2,748	−1.6%
2001	2,892	+5.2%
2011	3,284	+13.6%
2021	3,498	+6.5%

Source: Censuses

== Economy ==
Hrušovany u Brna is known for viticulture. It is located in the Velkopavlovická wine subregion.

== Transport ==
Hrušovany u Brna is located on the railway lines heading from Tišnov to Hustopeče and to Židlochovice via Brno.

== Sights ==
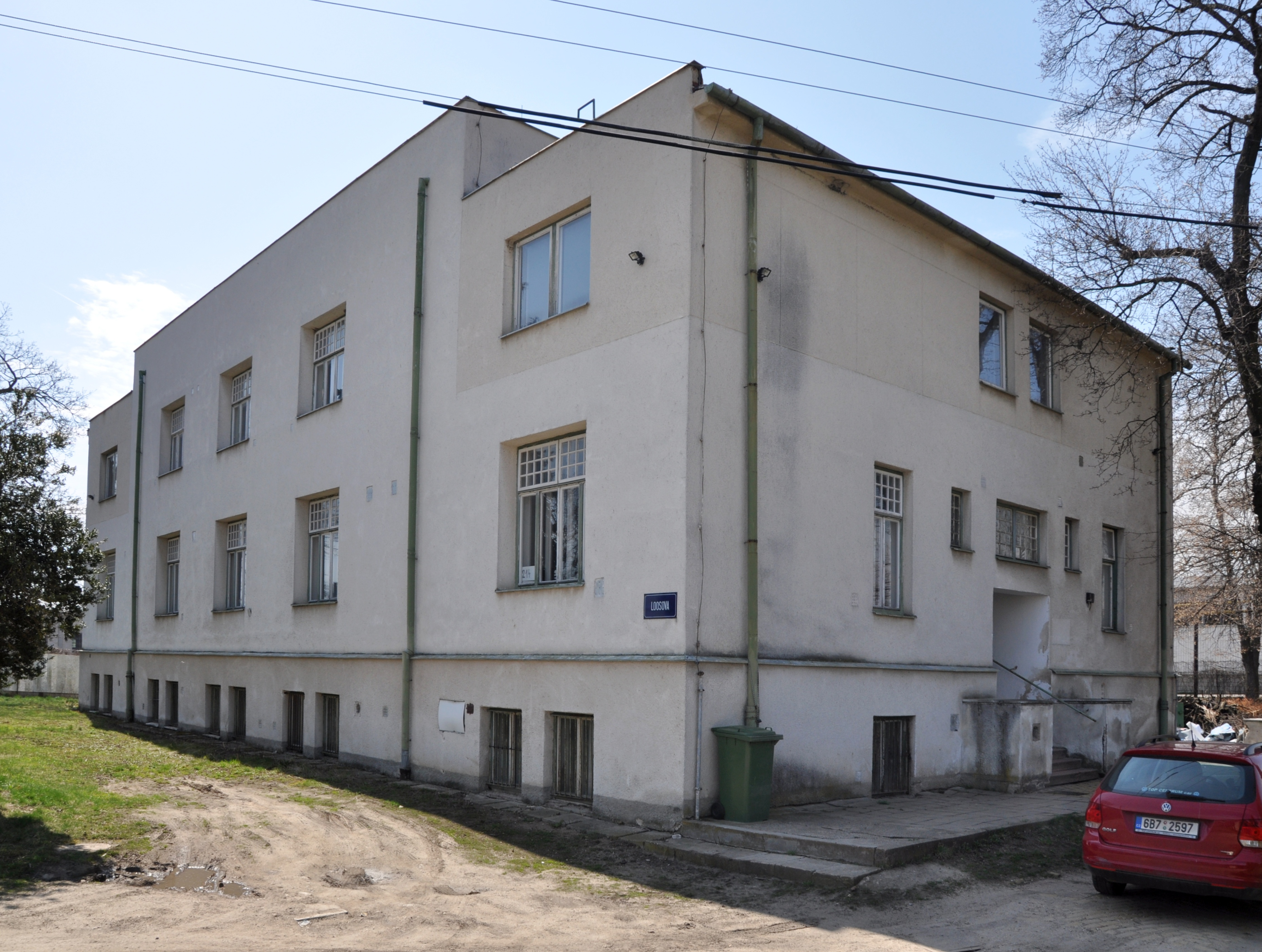
Villa of dr. Viktor Bauer

There are two protected cultural monuments in the municipality. An architecturally valuable building is the functionalist villa of Dr. Viktor Bauer. It was built in 1913–1914 by the architect Adolf Loos.

The second monument is a stone conciliation cross dating from 1595.

== Notable people ==
- Jan IV of Pernštejn (1487–1548), nobleman; died here
