= Anton Mišovec =

Czech football manager and player

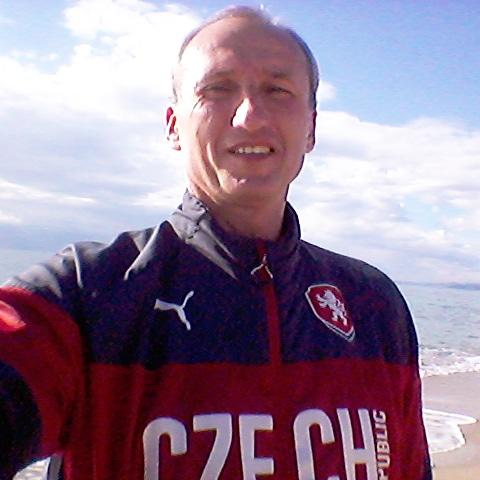

Personal information
- Date of birth: 6 January 1966 (age 60)
- Place of birth: Czechoslovakia

Managerial career
- Years: Team
- 1993–1997: Slavia Prague (youth)
- 1993–1997: SK Lázně Bohdaneč (youth)
- Pardubice (youth)
- Pardubice
- 2000–2001: Chrudim (youth)
- 2002: Chrudim
- 2002–2003: Pardubice regional union (youth)
- 2003–2006: Slavia Prague (youth)
- Ostrava (youth)
- Ostrava B
- Příbram (assistant)
- Dukla Banská Bystrica (youth)
- Slovácko (youth)
- –2011: Slovácko B
- TJ Svitavy (youth)
- 2013–2016: Slavia Prague women
- 2016–2017: Slavia Prague (youth)
- 2017: Litoměřicko
- 2018–2019: Prešov
- 2022: Viktoria Žižkov (assistant)
- 2023: Sparta Prague women

Anton Mišovec (born 6 January 1966) is a Czech football manager, head and team coach (U teams, Men, Women) with an UEFA Pro Licence, and former player.

Anton Mišovec coached U teams of SK Slavia Prague from 1993 to 1997. He then moved to coach the youth team in Lázně Bohdaneč. A year later he coached the U and men teams of Pardubice. In the 2000-2001 season, he coached the U teams in MFK Chrudim and also the club's sports classes, in 2002, he also coached its men team. In the 2002-2003 season, he became a professional youth coach for the Pardubice Regional Association.

In 2003, he returned to Slavia to coach the U teams and won the 2004 youth coach award in a non-professional sports poll. He worked there until 2006. This was followed by a stint with the FC Baník Ostrava U teams and briefly with the B team in the third league.

He was an assistant, and team coach in 1. FK Příbram for one year and with the then second league team he won promotion to the first league. Other stints include coaching the junior team of FK Dukla Banská Bystrica, the U and the B team of 1. FC Slovácko. After that he coached the U teams in Svitavy.

From 2013 to 2016 he coached the SK Slavia Praha (women) team, playing in the 1st league, becoming Champions of the Czech Republic and reaching quarterfinals of the Champions League. 2016 he moved on to coach the U teams, until 2018.

From May 2023 to September 2023 he coached the AC Sparta Prague (women) team.
